= Tendong–Mulong Highway =

Road in Malaysia

Federal Route 208
- Tendong-Mulong Highway

Route information
- Length: 2.80 km (1.74 mi)

Major junctions
- Northwest end: Tendong
- FT 3 AH18 Federal Route 3 FT 130 Federal Route 130; FT 207 Federal Route 207; FT 8 Federal Route 8
- Southeast end: Mulong

Location
- Country: Malaysia
- Primary destinations: Salor; Kampung Cabang Tiga Pendek

Highway system
- Highways in Malaysia; Expressways; Federal; State

Tendong–Mulong Highway, Federal Route 208 (formerly Kelantan State Route D112) is a major highway in Kelantan, Malaysia.

The kilometre zero of Federal Route 208 starts at Tendong.

At most sections, the Federal Route 208 was built under the JKR R5 road standard, allowing maximum speed limit of up to 90 km/h.

== List of junctions and towns ==
km	Exit	Junctions	To	Remarks
FT 208; 0	1	Tendong; Tendong Junctions	Northeast; FT 3 AH18 Wakaf Baharu; FT 3 AH18 Kota Bharu Southwest; FT 3 AH18 Pasir Mas; FT 3 AH18 Rantau Panjang; 4056 AH18 Sungai Golok (Thailand)	T-junctions
FT 208 Tendong–Mulong Highway; Start/end of highway
		Sungai Kelantan bridge Sultan Ismail Petra Bridge		Start/End of bridge U-turn interchange
Sungai Kelantan bridge Sultan Ismail Petra Bridge; Pasir Mas-Kota Bharu district border
	2	Sungai Kelantan bridge Sultan Ismail Petra Bridge; Salor Interchange	Southwest; FT 130 Salor; D15 Durian Rendang; D15 Kok Lanas Northeast; FT 130 Wakaf Che Yeh	Start/end of bridge U-turn interchange
	3	Kampung Chabang Tiga Pendek; Kampung Chabang Tiga Pendek Junctions	Northeast; FT 207 Wakaf Che Yeh; FT 207 Pasir Hor Southwest; FT 207 Pasir Mas	Junctions
		Sungai Salor bridge		
	4	Kampung Binjai; Kampung Binjai Exit	D15 Jalan Durian Rendang South; Durian Rendang; Kok Lanas	Tendong bound
FT 208 D112 Tendong–Mulong Highway
FT 208 D112 Tendong–Mulong Highway; Start/end of highway
	5	Mulong; Mulong Junctions	North; FT 8 Kota Bharu; FT 8 Wakaf Che Yeh South; FT 8 Gua Musang; FT 8 Kuala Krai; FT 8 Machang	Junctions
