= Kota Bharu–Kuala Krai Expressway =

Road in Malaysia

Federal Route 34
- Kota Bharu–Kuala Krai Expressway

Route information
- Maintained by Malaysian Public Works Department
- Length: 73 km (45 mi)
- Existed: 2012–present
- History: Expected completion in 2026

Major junctions
- North end: Kota Bharu
- FT 3 AH18 Federal Route 3 FT 8 Federal Route 8 FT 4 Federal Route 4 FT 209 Jalan Pasir Hor; D114 Jalan Perol; D14 Jalan Melor-Ketereh; D136 Jalan Selising-Kok Lanas; FT 4 Federal Route 4 D225 Jalan Batu Balai; FT 34 Central Spine Road
- South end: Kuala Krai

Location
- Country: Malaysia
- Primary destinations: Ketereh, Machang, Pasir Mas, Tanah Merah, Gua Musang

Highway system
- Highways in Malaysia; Expressways; Federal; State

Kota Bharu–Kuala Krai Expressway (Malay: Lebuhraya Kota Bharu-Kuala Krai) also known as the People's Expressway (Malay: Lebuhraya Rakyat) or Federal Route 34, is a state expressway that is under construction in Kelantan, Malaysia. It was planned as a national expressway, but was constructed as a state expressway because the federal government dropped out of the expressway project several times since 1990; consequently, the expressway will be the first state-owned controlled-access expressway once completed. Nevertheless, the project was gradually integrated into the Central Spine Road 34 project by 2015 and uses the same continuous exit numbers.

== Overview ==
The Kota Bharu–Kuala Krai Expressway is a 73-kilometre (45 mi) expressway connecting the city of Kota Bharu and Kuala Krai in Kelantan. The expressway will be built as a four-lane dual-carriageway expressway with full access control. There are nine grade-separated interchanges and two rest areas will be constructed along the expressway.

The construction of the expressway is state-funded without toll collection. In addition to the state fund, the public may contribute for the expressway construction through a wakaf fund.

The expressway is being built in three phases. Phase 1 from Bukit Tiu to Kuala Krai was constructed first, as the section runs along the state-owned land, eliminating the compensation costs for land takeovers. Meanwhile, Phase 3 from Pasir Hor to Kota Bharu will be the final section to be built, as the section will be an elevated expressway built on top of the existing Federal Route 8, making the section as the most expensive section of the expressway.

== History ==
The construction of the Kota Bharu–Kuala Krai Expressway was planned as early as during the Fifth Malaysia Plan during the end of the 1980s. The expressway was planned to be built as an alternative for the badly-congested Federal Route 8 along the Kota Bharu–Kuala Krai section, which becomes worse during festive season. However, the expressway project was dropped off, due to the loss of the Kelantanese Barisan Nasional state government to Pan-Malaysian Islamic Party-Semangat 46 coalition during the 1990 election causing state and federal administration with different parties also PAS party manifesto to oppose any toll charge in his administration. The project was later revived by the fifth Prime Minister, Tun Abdullah Ahmad Badawi as one of the projects under the Ninth Malaysia Plan, but was dropped off again ultimately after Datuk Seri Najib Razak became the sixth Prime Minister. As a result, the PAS-led Kelantan state government decided to construct the expressway by themselves. The expressway construction was inaugurated by the Menteri Besar of Kelantan, Tuan Guru Nik Abdul Aziz Nik Mat on 28 May 2012.

The construction of the expressway by the PAS-led Kelantan state government was heavily criticized by the Barisan Nasional-led federal government, claiming that the expressway project was nothing but just a mere political gimmick by the state government. In addition, Barisan Nasional-led federal government also criticized the wakaf method being used to fund the expressway construction. On the other hand, the state government criticized the federal government for not being cooperative and supportive regarding the expressway construction, hence disputing the federal government's integrity.

On 20 January 2012 during the BN-sponsored Jelajah Janji Ditepati (Promises Fulfilled) roadshow at Kota Bharu, Datuk Seri Najib Razak included the expressway project as one of the seven federal mega projects being promised for Kelantan if BN takes over Kelantan from PAS during the upcoming 13th general election. However, the promise was heavily criticized by the incumbent PAS-led state government for being a conditional manifesto, as well as plagiarizing the state government's own plans. Datuk Husam Musa, the chairman of the Economic Planning, Finance and Welfare Committee of Kelantan, said that the federal government should have executed the expressway project a long time ago rather than making promises, as the project had already been approved during the Fifth Malaysian Plan and once again during the Ninth Malaysian Plan.

== Interchange lists ==
The entire route is located in Kelantan.

Legend:

- I/C - Interchange, I/S - Intersection, RSA - Rest and service area, OBR - Overhead bridge restaurant, R/R - Restaurant and rest plaza, L/B - Layby, V/P - Vista point, TN - tunnel, T/P - Toll plaza, BR - Bridge
- C - Cloverleaf, S - Stack, T-A - Trumpet-A, T-B - Trumpet-B, DT - Directional-T/Y, SDT - Semi-Directional-T/Y, P-Y - Partial-Y, D - Diamond, P-C - Partial cloverleaf, D-D - Diverging diamond, D-R - Direct ramp

| District | Km | Exit | Name | Destinations | Notes |
|---|---|---|---|---|---|
| Kota Bharu | | –– | Kota Bharu–Pasir Hor flyover Kota Bharu I/C | FT 3 AH18 Jalan Sultan Yahya Petra – Tumpat, Pasir Mas, Kubang Kerian; FT 8 Jalan Sultan Ibrahim – Kota Bharu city center, Pengkalan Chepa | Interchange; Start/End of flyover |
| Kota Bharu | | –– | Pasir Hor I/C | FT 209 Jalan Pasir Hor – Pasir Hor, Wakaf Che Yeh | Interchange |
| Kota Bharu | | –– | Kadok I/C | D126 Kelantan State Route – Kadok | Interchange |
| Kota Bharu | | 14 | Ketereh I/C | D14 Kelantan State Route 14 – Ketereh, Melor | Interchange |
| Kota Bharu | | –– | Kok Lanas I/C | D136 Kelantan State Route 136 – Kok Lanas, Selising | Interchange |
| Machang | | –– | Bukit Tiu I/C | FT 4 Jalan Gerik–Pasir Puteh – Gerik, Jeli, Tanah Merah, Machang, Pasir Puteh | Interchange |
| Kuala Krai | | –– | Keroh I/C | FT 8 Malaysia Federal Route 8 – Keroh | Interchange |
Through to FT 34 Central Spine Road
