= Malaysia Federal Route 130 =

Road in Malaysia

Federal Route 130

Route information
- Maintained by Malaysian Public Works Department
- Length: 13.85 km (8.61 mi)

Major junctions
- Southwest end: Pasir Mas
- FT 3 / AH18 Federal Route 3 FT 129 Federal Route 129; FT 207 Federal Route 207; FT 208 Tendong–Mulong Highway; FT 8 Federal Route 8
- Northeast end: Wakaf Che Yeh

Location
- Country: Malaysia
- Primary destinations: Salor, Kampung Chabang Tiga Pendek

Highway system
- Highways in Malaysia; Expressways; Federal; State

Federal Route 130 is a federal road in Kelantan, Malaysia. The road connects Pasir Mas in the west to Wakaf Che Yeh in the east.

== Features ==
At most sections, the Federal Route 130 was built under the JKR R5 road standard, with a speed limit of 90 km/h (56 mph).

== Junction lists ==
The entire route is located in Kelantan.

Legend:

- I/C - Interchange, I/S - Intersection, RSA - Rest and service area, OBR - Overhead bridge restaurant, R/R - Restaurant and rest plaza, L/B - Layby, V/P - Vista point, TN - tunnel, T/P - Toll plaza, BR - Bridge
- C - Cloverleaf, S - Stack, T-A - Trumpet-A, T-B - Trumpet-B, DT - Directional-T/Y, SDT - Semi-Directional-T/Y, P-Y - Partial-Y, D - Diamond, P-C - Partial cloverleaf, D-D - Diverging diamond, D-R - Direct ramp

Location	km	mi	Exit	Name	Destinations	Notes
Pasir Mas	Pasir Mas			Pasir Mas	FT 3 / AH18 Malaysia Federal Route 3 – Pasir Mas town centre, Wakaf Baharu, Kota Bharu, Rantau Panjang, Sungai Golok (Thailand); FT 129 Malaysia Federal Route 129 – Tanah Merah	Diamond interchange
Pasir Mas–Kota Bharu district border				Sungai Kelantan bridge		
Kota Bharu	Wakaf Che Yeh			Seberang Pasir Mas		
Kota Bharu	Wakaf Che Yeh			Kampung Gertak Lembu		
Kota Bharu	Wakaf Che Yeh			Kampung Teluk Kandis		
Kota Bharu	Wakaf Che Yeh			Kampung Cabang Tiga Pendek	D15 Jalan Durian Rendang – Duriang Rendang, Kok Lanas, Pasir Hor; FT 208 Tendong–Mulong Highway – Tendong, Mulong	Intersections
Kota Bharu	Wakaf Che Yeh			Salor	K11 Jalan Pintu Geng	Roundabout
Kota Bharu	Wakaf Che Yeh			Wakaf Che Yeh	FT 8 Malaysia Federal Route 8 – Kota Bharu, Machang, Kuala Krai, Gua Musang	T-junctions
1.000 mi = 1.609 km; 1.000 km = 0.621 mi
