= Central Spine Road =

Road in Malaysia

Federal Route 34
- Kuala Krai–Kuala Pilah Highway, Central Spine Road; Lebuhraya Kuala Krai–Kuala Pilah, Jalan Utama Tengah 瓜拉吉赖–瓜拉庇劳大道, 中枢大道

Route information
- Maintained by Malaysian Public Works Department
- Length: 390 km (240 mi)
- Existed: 2012because–present
- History: Expected to be completed in 2028

Major junctions
- North end: Kuala Krai, Kelantan
- FT 34 Kota Bharu–Kuala Krai Expressway; FT 8 Federal Route 8 FT 185 Second East–West Highway East Coast Expressway / FT 2 / AH141; FT 2 Federal Route 2 FT 9 Federal Route 9
- South end: Simpang Pelangai, Pahang / Kuala Pilah, Negeri Sembilan

Location
- Country: Malaysia
- Primary destinations: Gua Musang, Sungai Yu, Chegar Perah, Kampung Relong, Kuala Lipis, Raub / Sungai Ruan, Bentong, Karak, Mempaga, Kuala Pilah, Bahau, Seremban

Highway system
- Highways in Malaysia; Expressways; Federal; State

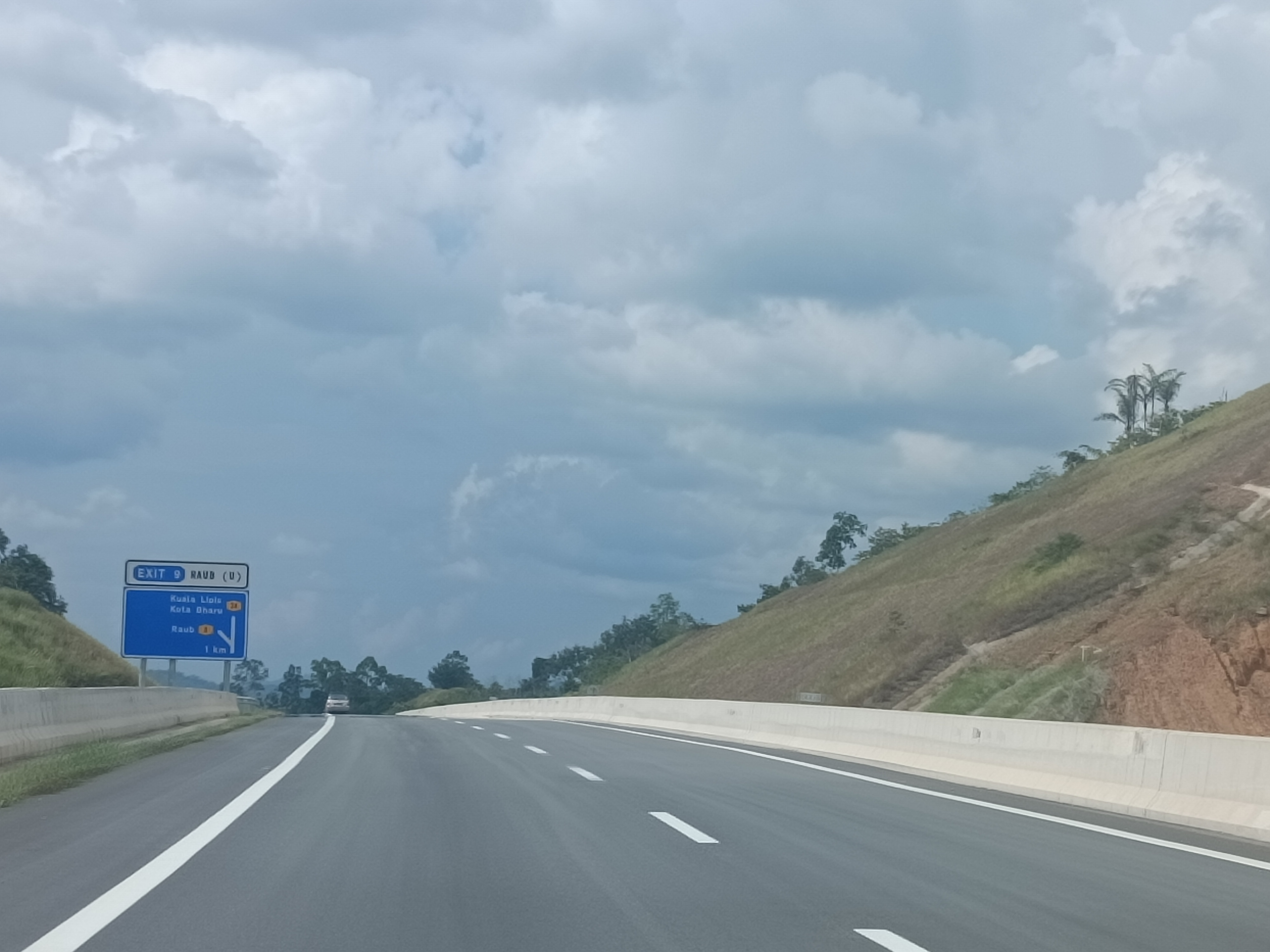
CSR at Raub North (Raub Utara)

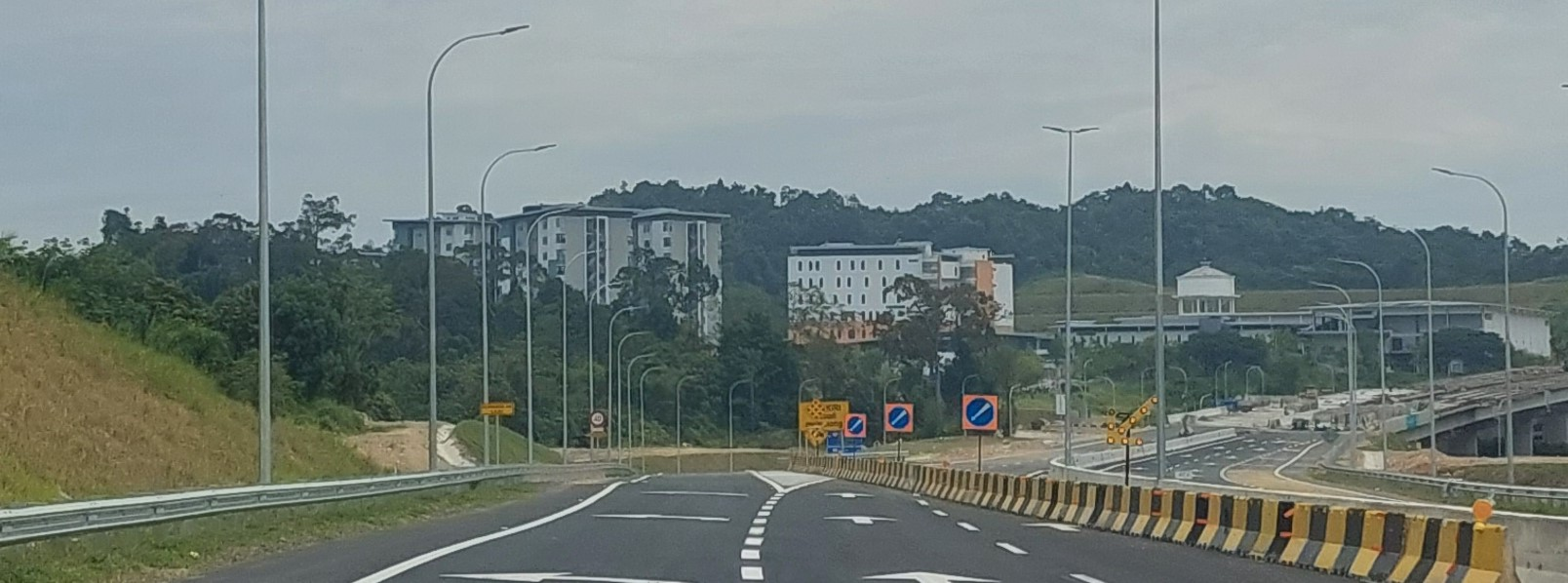
A completed section of the CSR near Raub, Pahang.

Central Spine Road (CSR) (Malay: Lebuhraya Lingkaran Tengah Utama) or Kuala Krai–Kuala Pilah Highway, Federal Route 34, is a new toll-free expressway under construction in the center of Peninsular Malaysia. The 390 kilometres (240 miles) of highway is being built to eventually replace the mostly two-lane Malaysia Federal Route 8 (Gua Musang Highway) as well as Malaysia Federal Route 9 (Karak–Tampin highway). Construction of CSR began at Package 3, from Merapoh to Kampung Relong because the old Gua Musang Highway passes through Chegar Perah, a section notorious for roadkill. The new highway has a long eco-viaduct built in this section. Package 5, which stretches from north Raub to Karak will be built next, which will connect it to the Kuala Lumpur–Karak Expressway (E8), bypassing Bentong and Mempaga. This will help detour traffic from the steep mountainous grade between Raub and Bentong.

== History ==
The construction of the highway is being undertaken in several phases:

- Phase 1 is a 51km stretch from Kuala Krai to Jambatan Sungai Lakit in Kelantan.
- Phase 2 is 63km long from Jambatan Sungai Lakit to Gua Musang in Kelantan
- Phase 3 is 107km long from Gua Musang to Kampung Relong in Pahang.
- Phase 4 is 56km long from Kampung Relong to Raub in Pahang
- Phase 5 is 54km long from Raub to Bentong
- Phase 6 is 47km long and connects Bentong and Simpang Pelangai. (this section is deferred)

On 15 December 2016, section 3H (Kg. Kechur to Kg. Sbrg. Jelai) was opened to traffic. As of July 2024, Package One from Kuala Krai to the Sungai Lakit Bridge is 11.59% complete; Package Two from the Sungai Lakit Bridge to Gua Musang is 22.40% complete. Package Three from Gua Musang to Kampung Relong is 84.25% complete; Package Four from Kampung Relong to Raub is 63.69% complete.

Users can now access Package Five from Raub to Bentong, and Package Six from Bentong to the LPT Junction is 30.07% complete.

== Features ==
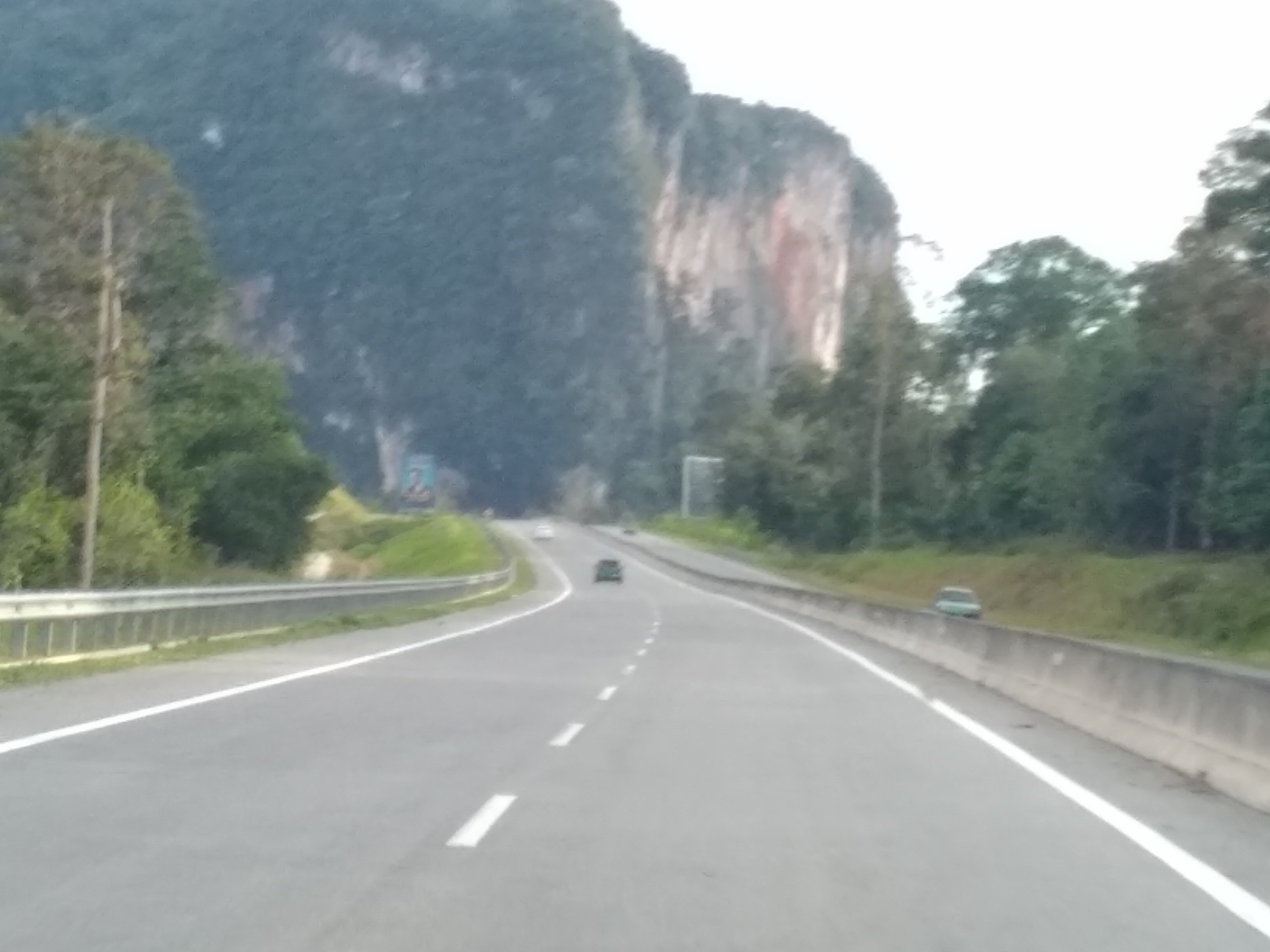
The CSR/LTU near Merapoh.

The Central Spine Road included these features as below.

- Four lanes, two on each side
- A long eco-viaduct for wild animals crossing
- Some sections are concrete paved
- Kilometre markers along the road

In most sections, it is built under JKR R5 road standards, allowing maximum speed limit of up to 90km/h.

From Kampung Sungai Yu to Chegar Perah and from Chegar Perah to Bukit Tujuh, it overlaps Federal Route 8 Merapoh Highway.

There are no sections with motorcycle lanes.

== Interchange lists ==
Legend:

- I/C - Interchange, I/S - Intersection, RSA - Rest and service area, OBR - Overhead bridge restaurant, R/R - Restaurant and rest plaza, L/B - Layby, V/P - Vista point, TN - tunnel, T/P - Toll plaza, BR - Bridge
- C - Cloverleaf, S - Stack, T-A - Trumpet-A, T-B - Trumpet-B, DT - Directional-T/Y, SDT - Semi-Directional-T/Y, P-Y - Partial-Y, D - Diamond, P-C - Partial cloverleaf, D-D - Diverging diamond, D-R - Direct ramp

State	District	Km	Exit	Name	Destination	Notes
Through to FT 34 Kota Bharu–Kuala Krai Expressway
Kelantan	Kuala Krai			Kuala Krai		
Kelantan	Gua Musang		BR	Sungai Lakit Bridge		
Kelantan	Gua Musang			Gua Musang	FT 185 Second East–West Highway – Cameron Highland, Ipoh, Tasik Kenyir, Kuala Terengganu	
Kelantan	Gua Musang			Mentara		
Pahang	Lipis			Merapoh I/C	FT 8 Malaysia Federal Route 8 – Merapoh, Sungai Relau National Park	LILO Karak bound
Pahang	Lipis			Merapoh I/C	FT 8 Malaysia Federal Route 8 – Merapoh, Sungai Relau National Park	LILO Kuala Krai bound
Pahang	Lipis		--	Kubang Rusa I/C	FT 8 Malaysia Federal Route 8 – Kampung Kubang Rusa, Kampung Sungai Yu, Sungai Yu Recreational Centre	Parclo B-2 interchange
Pahang	Lipis		BR	Sungai Yu Eco-Viaduct		
Pahang	Lipis		--	Sungai Yu I/C	FT 8 Gua Musang Highway – Kampung Sungai Yu, Sungai Yu Recreation Area, Merapoh	Trumpet interchange
Pahang	Lipis		--	Chegar Perah	FT 8 Malaysia Federal Route 8 – Chegar Perah	LILO Kuala Krai bound
Pahang	Lipis		--	Chegar Perah	FT 8 Malaysia Federal Route 8 – Chegar Perah	LILO Karak bound
Pahang	Lipis			U-Turn	U-Turn – Chegar Perah, Sungai Yu, Kubang Rusa, Merapoh, Mentara, Gua Musang, Kuala Krai, Kota Bharu	U-Turn south bound Under Construction
Pahang	Lipis			FELDA Telang		
Pahang	Lipis			Kampung Kechur		
Pahang	Lipis			Kampung Seberang Jelai		
Pahang	Lipis			Kampung Relong		
Pahang	Raub		9	Raub (U) I/C	FT 8 Malaysia Federal Route 8 – Raub, Sungai Ruan	Diamond interchange
Pahang	Raub		8	Raub (S) I/C	FT 1502 Malaysia Federal Route 1502 – Raub, FELDA Krau, Universiti Teknologi MARA (UiTM) Raub Campus, Bukit Fraser	Half diamond interchange
Pahang	Bentong		7	Bentong (U) I/C	FT 1498 Malaysia Federal Route 1498 – Kampung Lebu, FELDA Lurah Bilut	Diamond interchange
Pahang	Bentong		6	Mempaga I/C	FT 1498 Malaysia Federal Route 1498 – FELDA Mempaga Kuala Lumpur–Karak Expressway / FT 2 / AH141 – Kuala Lumpur, Genting Highlands, Kuantan	Roundabout interchange
Pahang	Bentong		6A	Bentong (S) I/C	FT 8 Malaysia Federal Route 8 – Bentong	Half diamond interchange
Pahang	Bentong		809	KLK I/C	Kuala Lumpur–Karak Expressway / FT 2 / AH141 – Kuala Lumpur, Genting Highlands	Trumpet interchange, entry only westbound
Pahang	Bentong			Kampung Telemong		
Pahang	Bentong			Mancis		
Pahang	Bentong		--	Simpang Pelangai	FT 9 Malaysia Federal Route 9 – Karak, Mancis, Kuala Klawang, Kuala Pilah, Seremban	T-junctions
Negeri Sembilan	Kuala Pilah					Planning
