= Malaysia Federal Route 207 =

Road in Malaysia

Federal Route 207

Route information
- Maintained by Malaysian Public Works Department
- Length: 12.00 km (7.46 mi)

Major junctions
- Southwest end: Pasir Mas
- FT 3 AH18 Federal Route 3 FT 129 Federal Route 129; FT 130 Federal Route 130; FT 208 Tendong-Mulong Highway; FT 8 Federal Route 8 FT 209 Federal Route 209
- Northeast end: Wakaf Che Yeh

Location
- Country: Malaysia
- Primary destinations: Kampung Chabang Tiga Pendek

Highway system
- Highways in Malaysia; Expressways; Federal; State

Federal Route 207 is a federal road in Kelantan, Malaysia. The road connects Pasir Mas in the west to Wakaf Che Yeh in the east.

== Features ==
At most sections, the Federal Route 207 was built under the JKR R5 road standard, with a speed limit of 90 km/h.

== List of junctions and towns ==
km	Exit	Junctions	To	Remarks
		Wakaf Che Yeh	North FT 8 Kota Bharu East FT 209 Pasir Hor FT 209 Kubang Kerian South FT 8 Gua Musang FT 8 Kuala Krai FT 8 Machang	Junctions
		Kampung Cabang Tiga Pendek	Northwest FT 208 Tendong FT 3 AH18 Wakaf Bharu Southeast FT 208 Mulong	Junctions
		Seberang Pasir Mas		
		Sungai Kelantan bridge		
		Pasir Mas	North FT 3 AH18 Pasir Mas town centre FT 3 AH18 Wakaf Bharu FT 3 AH18 Kota Bharu West FT 3 AH18 Rantau Panjang 4057 AH18 Sungai Golok (Thailand) South FT 129 Tanah Merah	Junctions
