= Malaysia Federal Route 8 =

Road in Malaysia

Federal Route 8
- Kuala Lumpur–Kota Bharu Highway; Jalan Kuala Lumpur–Kota Bharu; Gua Musang Highway

Route information
- Maintained by Malaysian Public Works Department
- Length: 402.7 km (250.2 mi)
- Existed: 1887–present
- History: Completed in 1986

Major junctions
- North end: Kota Bharu, Kelantan
- FT 3 / AH18 Wakaf Bharu–Kota Bharu–Kubang Kerian Highway; FT 209 Federal Route 209; FT 207 Federal Route 207; FT 130 Federal Route 130 FT 4 / AH140 Federal Route 4 FT 66 Federal Route 66; FT 185 Second East–West Highway; FT 34 Central Spine Road; FT 235 Federal Route 235; FT 234 Federal Route 234 (Jalan Pekeliling); FT 64 Federal Route 64; FT 218 Federal Route 218; FT 68 Federal Route 68 Kuala Lumpur–Karak Expressway / FT 2 / AH141
- South end: Bentong, Pahang

Location
- Country: Malaysia
- Primary destinations: Tanah Merah, Machang, Kuala Krai, Gua Musang, Padang Tengku, Kuala Lipis, Benta, Raub

Highway system
- Highways in Malaysia; Expressways; Federal; State

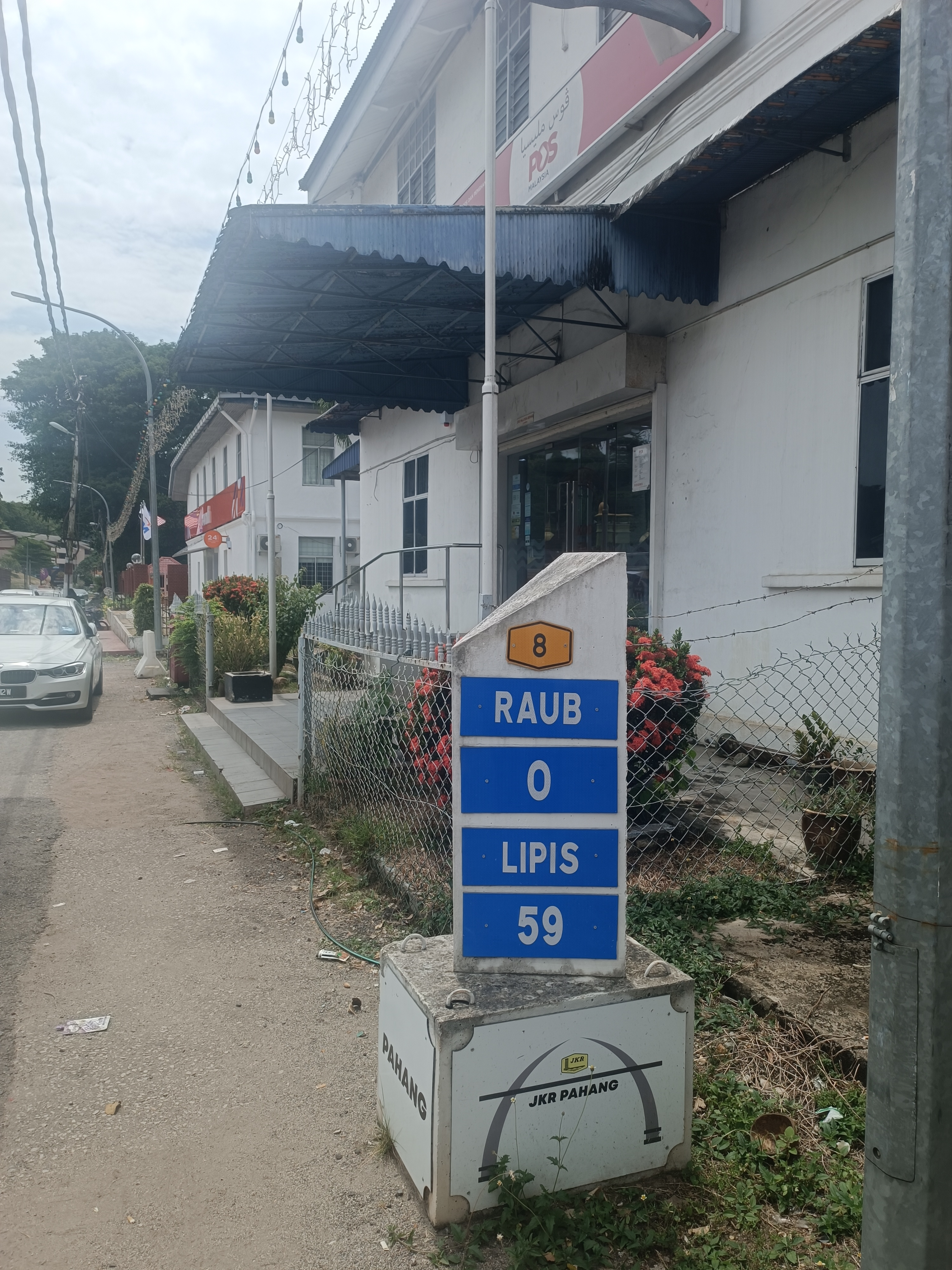
0KM sign at Raub

The Federal Route 8, also known as the Kuala Lumpur–Kota Bharu Highway (Malay: Jalan Kuala Lumpur–Kota Bharu), is a 402.7-km federal highway in Malaysia. It connects Bentong in the south to Kota Bharu in the north. The highway had two parts - Kota Bharu–Kuala Krai Road (Malay: Jalan Kota Bharu–Kuala Krai) and Bentong–Kuala Lipis Road (Malay: Jalan Bentong–Kuala Lipis) until the completion of the missing link from Kuala Krai to Kuala Lipis, causing the entire FT8 highway to take 99 years to be completed.

== Route background ==
The Kilometre Zero of the Federal Route 8 starts at its interchange with the Kuala Lumpur–Karak Expressway E8 (Exit 810) at Bentong, Pahang. Together with the Federal Route 9, it runs along the eastern foothills of the Titiwangsa Range from its southern terminus to Raub. Then, the highways runs further from the Titiwangsa towards Kuala Lipis, and then runs along the western foothills of the Tahan Range towards Kuala Krai. Finally, the Federal Route 8 runs along the eastern bank of the Kelantan River to its northern terminus at Kota Bharu.

The FT8 highway is notorious for its severe traffic congestion, especially along the Kota Bharu–Kuala Krai section. The traffic congestion becomes apparent during festive seasons, with the recorded journey time from Kuala Lumpur to Kota Bharu exceeding 16 hours during the 2014 Hari Raya Aidilfitri festive season.

== History ==
A portion of the Federal Route 8 was a part of the 80-mile Kuala Kubu–Kuala Lipis Road, the earliest trunk road in Pahang, which was constructed by the Public Works Department in 1887. The Kuala Kubu–Kuala Lipis Road connected Kuala Kubu Bharu in Selangor and Kuala Lipis in Pahang. Later, a section from Teranum to Bentong was constructed in 1915. At the same time, the Kota Bharu–Kuala Krai Road was constructed, together with the Kuala Terengganu–Kuantan Road FT3. The original FT8 section from Raub to Bentong via Teranum was later bypassed by a more straight super two highway in 1958 in conjunction of the opening of FELDA Lurah Bilut, causing the old, winding section to be re-gazetted as the Federal Route 218.

However, Bentong–Kuala Lipis Road FT8 and Kota Bharu–Kuala Krai Road FT8 were not extended, creating a 219-km missing link from Kuala Lipis to Kuala Krai. The missing link was only constructed in 1981. The Kuala Krai–Gua Musang Highway FT8 was completed first in August 1983, followed by the Kuala Lipis–Gua Musang Highway FT8 in 1986.

=== Upgrading into the Central Spine Road ===
Some parts of the Federal Route 8 can be seen to have constructions which are an upgrading progress of the route. The highway construction can be seen after Merapoh which is at Bukit Tujuh. The highway will take a new route (Central Spine Road) at Chegar Perah thus reducing the accident risks involving animals and sharp corners. Now, some parts of the old route at Chegar Perah had been demolished and motorist have been redirected into the Central Spine Road for a few kilometres before being redirected back to the Federal Route 8 just before Bukit Tujuh (Seven Hills).

== Junction and town lists ==
Legend:

- I/C - Interchange, I/S - Intersection, RSA - Rest and service area, OBR - Overhead bridge restaurant, R/R - Restaurant and rest plaza, L/B - Layby, V/P - Vista point, TN - tunnel, T/P - Toll plaza, BR - Bridge
- C - Cloverleaf, S - Stack, T-A - Trumpet-A, T-B - Trumpet-B, DT - Directional-T/Y, SDT - Semi-Directional-T/Y, P-Y - Partial-Y, D - Diamond, P-C - Partial cloverleaf, D-D - Diverging diamond, D-R - Direct ramp

State	District	Location	km	mi	Exit	Name	Destinations	Notes
Kelantan	Kota Bharu	Kota Bharu	0.0	0.0		Kota Bharu; WKK I/C	FT 3 / AH18 Wakaf Bharu–Kota Bharu–Kubang Kerian Highway – Wakaf Baharu, Pasir Mas, Tumpat, Rantau Panjang, Pattani (Thailand), Pengkalan Chepa, Peringat, Pasir Puteh, Kuala Terengganu, Sultan Ismail Petra Airport; Jalan Sultan Ibrahim – Kota Bharu Town Centre, Pantai Cahaya Bulan (Pantai Cinta Berahi)	Junctions
Kelantan	Kota Bharu	Kota Bharu				Kota Darul Naim		
Kelantan	Kota Bharu	Kota Bharu				Bunut Payung		
Kelantan	Kota Bharu	Kota Bharu			Sungai Pengkalan Datu bridge			
Kelantan	Kota Bharu	Wakaf Che Yeh				Wakaf Che Yeh	FT 130 Malaysia Federal Route 130 – Salor, Pasir Mas	Junctions
Kelantan	Kota Bharu	Wakaf Che Yeh				Wakaf Che Yeh	FT 207 Malaysia Federal Route 207 – Salor, Pasir Mas; FT 209 Malaysia Federal Route 209 – Pasir Hor, Kubang Kerian	Junctions
Kelantan	Machang	Ketereh				Kadok		
Kelantan	Machang	Ketereh				Ketereh	D14 Jalan Ketereh – Durian Rendang, Bachok, Jelawat	Junctions
Kelantan	Machang	Ketereh				Pulai Chondong		
Kelantan	Machang	Machang				Machang Bypass	FT 8 Machang Bypass – Kuala Krai, Gua Musang	T-junctions
Kelantan	Machang	Machang				Machang (North)	FT 4 / AH140 Malaysia Federal Route 4 – Gerik, Jeli, Tanah Merah, Pasir Puteh, Besut, Kuala Terengganu	Junctions
Kelantan	Machang	Machang				Machang		
Kelantan	Machang	Machang				Machang Bypass	FT 8 Machang Bypass – Kota Bharu, Kerteh	T-junctions
Kelantan	Machang	Machang			Sungai Sat bridge			
Kelantan	Machang	Machang				Kampung Pemanok		
Kelantan	Machang	Machang				Kampung Merkel		
Kelantan	Machang	Machang				Kampung Kijal		
Kelantan	Kuala Krai	Kuala Krai				Kampung Keroh		
Kelantan	Kuala Krai	Kuala Krai				Pekan Jambu Lawar Batu 30		
Kelantan	Kuala Krai	Kuala Krai			Sungai Nal bridge			
Kelantan	Kuala Krai	Kuala Krai				Guchil		
Kelantan	Kuala Krai	Kuala Krai				Kuala Krai		
Kelantan	Kuala Krai	Kuala Krai				Kuala Krai	Kuala Krai District and Land Office	
Kelantan	Kuala Krai	Kuala Krai				Maktab Rendah Sains MARA (MRSM) Kuala Krai	Maktab Rendah Sains MARA (MRSM) Kuala Krai	
Kelantan	Kuala Krai	Kuala Krai				Pahi		
Kelantan	Kuala Krai	Kuala Krai				Kampung Sungai Peria		
Kelantan	Kuala Krai	Kuala Krai				Manek Urai		
Kelantan	Kuala Krai	Kuala Krai				Kampung Temiang		
Kelantan	Kuala Krai	Kuala Krai				Kampung Karangan		
Kelantan	Kuala Krai	Kuala Krai				Lata Beringin		
Kelantan	Kuala Krai	Kuala Krai				Kampung Laloh		
Kelantan	Kuala Krai	Kuala Krai			Sungai Lebir bridge			
Kelantan	Gua Musang	Gua Musang				Kampung Bukit Tebok	FT 66 Malaysia Federal Route 66 – Dabong, Jeli, Gerik	T-junctions
Kelantan	Gua Musang	Gua Musang				Chegar Bongor		
Kelantan	Gua Musang	Gua Musang				Chiku		
Kelantan	Gua Musang	Gua Musang			Sungai Chiku bridge			
Kelantan	Gua Musang	Gua Musang			Gua Musang RSA			
Kelantan	Gua Musang	Gua Musang				Jalan Sungai Cheweh	D237 Jalan Sungai Cheweh – Sungai Cheweh	T-junctions
Kelantan	Gua Musang	Gua Musang			Sungai Asap bridge			
Kelantan	Gua Musang	Gua Musang				Sungai Asap		
Kelantan	Gua Musang	Gua Musang				Gua Musang; Bandar Utama Gua Musang	Bandar Utama Gua Musang	T-junctions
Kelantan	Gua Musang	Gua Musang			Railway crossing bridge			
Kelantan	Gua Musang	Gua Musang				Gua Musang; Gua Musang railway station	Gua Musang railway station	T-junctions
Kelantan	Gua Musang	Gua Musang				Gua Musang; Jalan Pulai	Jalan Pulai – Town Centre, Kesedar Inn	T-junctions
Kelantan	Gua Musang	Gua Musang			Sungai Ketil bridge			
Kelantan	Gua Musang	Gua Musang				Gua Musang; Bandar Baru Gua Musang	Jalan Bandar Baru (Bandar Baru Gua Musang) – Gua Musang District and Land Office, Majlis Daerah Gua Musang (MDGM) headquarters, Masjid Tengku Muhammad Faris Petra, Kelantan South Development Authority (KESEDAR) headquarters, Gua Musang District Library, FELDA Gua Musang district office, RISDA Gua Musang district office, Road Transport Department Malaysia (JPJ) Gua Musang district headquarters Jalan PPR Gua Musang – PPR Gua Musang; FT 185 Second East–West Highway – Cameron Highlands, Simpang Pulai, Ipoh; North–South Expressway Northern Route / AH2 – Bukit Kayu Hitam, Penang, Kuala Lumpur; D29 Jalan Dabong–Gua Musang – Dabong, Jeli	Junctions
Kelantan	Gua Musang	Gua Musang				Gua Musang; Jalan Hospital	FT 2744 Jalan Hospital – Gua Musang Hospital	
Kelantan	Gua Musang	Gua Musang				KESEDAR Golf Course	KESEDAR Golf Course	
Kelantan	Gua Musang	Gua Musang				Gua Musang; Jalan Industri I/C	Jalan Industri – Pulai, Taman Damar, Taman Wangi	Diamond interchange
Kelantan	Gua Musang	Gua Musang				Gua Musang; Jalan Industri Roundabout	Jalan Industri – Pulai, Gua Musang Industrial Area	Roundabout
Kelantan	Gua Musang	Gua Musang			Gua Musang RSA			
Kelantan	Gua Musang	Gua Musang				SMS Gua Musang		
Kelantan	Gua Musang	Gua Musang				Kampung Tanah Puteh		
Kelantan	Gua Musang	Gua Musang				Kampung Batu Papan		
Kelantan	Gua Musang	Gua Musang				Mentara		
Kelantan	Gua Musang	Gua Musang				Kampung Sungai Tupai		
Pahang	Lipis	Lipis				Kampung Tanggang		
Pahang	Lipis	Lipis				Merapoh		
Pahang	Lipis	Lipis				Kampung Persit		
Pahang	Lipis	Lipis				Kampung Merhamah		
Pahang	Lipis	Lipis				Kampung Kubang Rasa		
Pahang	Lipis	Lipis				Sungai Yu		
Pahang	Lipis	Lipis				FELCRA Sungai Temau		
Pahang	Lipis	Lipis				FELDA Cegar Perah 1 & 2		
Pahang	Lipis	Lipis				Taman Rimba Kenong	Taman Rimba Kenong	
Pahang	Lipis	Lipis				Kampung Dada Kering		
Pahang	Lipis	Lipis				Kampung Tekal Jernih		
Pahang	Lipis	Lipis				Kampung Bedong		
Pahang	Lipis	Lipis				Kampung Petola		
Pahang	Lipis	Lipis				Kampung Bukit		
Pahang	Lipis	Lipis				Kampung Pagar Sasak		
Pahang	Lipis	Lipis				Kampung Sentang		
Pahang	Lipis	Lipis				Kampung Gelanggang		
Pahang	Lipis	Lipis				Kampung Melaka		
Pahang	Lipis	Lipis				Jalan Utama Kecau	FT 1506 Jalan Utama Kecau – Kuala Lipis	T-junctions
Pahang	Lipis	Lipis				Kampung Kechur		
Pahang	Lipis	Lipis				Kuala Tui		
Pahang	Lipis	Lipis				Kampung Seberang Jelai		
Pahang	Lipis	Lipis				Kampung Beralas		
Pahang	Lipis	Lipis			Sungai Pahang bridge			
Pahang	Lipis	Lipis			Railway crossing bridge			
Pahang	Lipis	Lipis				Padang Tengku		
Pahang	Lipis	Lipis				Berchang	FT 235 Malaysia Federal Route 235 – Sungai Koyan, Cameron Highlands	T-junctions
Pahang	Lipis	Lipis				Kampung Tempoyang		
Pahang	Lipis	Lipis				Kuala Lipis	Jalan Ceneras – Town Centre, Kuala Lipis District and Land Office, Masjid Sultan Mahmud (Kuala Lipis District Mosque), Tanjung Lipis Rest House, Kuala Lipis Hospital , Kuala Lipis Railway Station	T-junctions
Pahang	Lipis	Lipis				Kuala Lipis	FT 234 Jalan Pekeliling – Town Centre, Jerantut, Kerambit, Kuala Tembeling, Taman Negara (National Park), Kuala Lipis District and Land Office, Masjid Sultan Mahmud (Kuala Lipis District Mosque), Tanjung Lipis Rest House, Kuala Lipis Hospital , Kuala Lipis Railway Station	T-junctions
Pahang	Lipis	Lipis				Kampung Binjai		
Pahang	Lipis	Lipis				Kampung Batu Enam		
Pahang	Lipis	Lipis				Kampung Rengai		
Pahang	Lipis	Lipis				Taman Jelai		
Pahang	Lipis	Lipis			Sungai Benta bridge			
Pahang	Lipis	Lipis				Benta	FT 64 Malaysia Federal Route 64 – Jerantut, Temerloh, Kuantan, Bandar Pusat Jengka, Maran	Roundabout
Pahang	Raub	Sega				Kampung Batu Buaya	C154 Jalan Seberang Lipis – Kampung Seberang Lipis	T-junctions
Pahang	Raub	Sega				Kampung Jeram Besu		
Pahang	Raub	Sega				Sega	C2 Jalan Batu Talam – Batu Talam	T-junctions
Pahang	Raub	Sega				Kampung Jeruas		
Pahang	Raub	Dong				Kuala Dong	C158 Jalan Tanjung Tengku – Tanjung Tengku, Cheroh	T-junctions
Pahang	Raub	Dong				Kampung Ajai		
Pahang	Raub	Dong				Kampung Temau	C146 Jalan Ulu Temau – Kampung Ulu Temau	T-junctions
Pahang	Raub	Dong				Kampung Kuala Gali		
Pahang	Raub	Dong				Dong	C144 Jalan Dong – Ulu Dong	T-junctions
Pahang	Raub	Dong				Kampung Sungai Pasu		
Pahang	Raub	Dong				Kampung Gali		
Pahang	Raub	Dong				Kampung Jemapai		
Pahang	Raub	Dong				Kampung Pintu Padang	C142 Jalan Ulu Gali – Ulu Gali	T-junctions
Pahang	Raub	Raub				Raub	Raub District and Land Office	
Pahang	Raub	Raub				Raub	C5 Jalan Cheroh-Batu Malim (Also known as just Jalan Cheroh in Raub Town) – Cheroh, Batu Talam, Batu Malim, Sungai Koyan, Cameron Highlands; C135 Jalan Tengku Abdul Samad – Bukit Koman	Crossroads
Pahang	Raub	Raub				Raub; Raub Town Centre		Route known as Jalan Tun Razak; South-bound traffic only North-bound traffic uses Jalan Dato' Abdullah running parallel to the west
Pahang	Raub	Raub				Raub; Taman Raub Jaya	Taman Raub Jaya	
Pahang	Raub	Raub				Raub; Jalan Tras	FT 218 Old Bentong-Raub Road (Jalan Tras) – Teras, Teranum, Kuala Kubu Bharu, Fraser's Hill, Tanjung Malim, Kuala Lumpur	Signalised T-junction; Section of road between FT 218 intersection and Raub Town Centre is also known as Jalan Tras
Pahang	Raub	Raub				Raub; FELDA Krau	FT 1502 Jalan FELDA Krau – Universiti Teknologi MARA Raub Campus, FELDA Krau, Kampung Melayu Sempalit	Signalised T-junction
Pahang	Raub	Raub				Kampung Sungai Dalam		
Pahang	Bentong	Bilut				FELDA Lurah Bilut	FT 1496 Jalan FELDA Lurah Bilut – FELDA Lurah Bilut	T-junction
Pahang	Bentong	Bilut				Kampung Baharu		
Pahang	Bentong	Bilut				Kampung Asap	FT 1496 Jalan Mempaga – FELDA Mempaga, Kampung Lebu, Bentong	T-junction
Pahang	Bentong	Bilut				Old Bentong-Raub Road	FT 218 Old Bentong-Raub Road – Kampung Sungai Penjuring, Sang Lee, Kampung Sungai Chetang, Teranum, Kuala Kubu Bharu, Fraser's Hill, Tanjung Malim, Kuala Lumpur	T-junction
Pahang	Bentong	Bilut				Taman Desa Damai		T-junction
Pahang	Bentong	Bilut				Kampung Kuala Repas		T-junction
Pahang	Bentong	Bilut				Kampung Chamang	C136 Jalan Chamang – Chamang New Village, Chamang waterfall	T-junction
Pahang	Bentong	Bentong				Bentong	Bentong district mosque	
Pahang	Bentong	Bentong				Bentong	Bentong District and Land Office	
Pahang	Bentong	Bentong				Bentong	Bentong Town Centre	Route known as Jalan Loke Yew; South-bound traffic only North-bound traffic uses Jalan Ah Peng running parallel to the west
Pahang	Bentong	Bentong			Sungai Bentong bridge			
Pahang	Bentong	Bentong				Bentong; Sungai Marong	Taman Bukit Indah, Kampung Sungai Marong	Signalised crossroads
Pahang	Bentong	Bentong				Bentong; Taman Ketari		
Pahang	Bentong	Bentong				Bentong; Ketari	FT 68 Jalan Gombak-Bentong – Bukit Tinggi, Janda Baik, Gombak, Kuala Lumpur	Signalised T-junction
Pahang	Bentong	Bentong				Tengku Sulaiman Mosque		
Pahang	Bentong	Bentong			Sungai Benus bridge			
Pahang	Bentong	Bentong				Kampung Benus		
Pahang	Bentong	Bentong				Kampung Bukit Piatu		
Pahang	Bentong	Bentong				Central Spine Road; Bentong	FT 34 Central Spine Road – Lurah Bilut, Raub, Kota Bharu, Mempaga	Half-diamond interchange Entry towards and exit from north only
Pahang	Bentong	Bentong				Bentong Industrial Area		Junctions
Pahang	Bentong	Bentong	402.7	250.2	801/ E8 810	Bentong East-KLKE I/C	Kuala Lumpur–Karak Expressway / FT 2 / AH141 – Kuala Lumpur, Gombak, Genting Highlands, Karak, Kuantan, Kuala Terengganu	Trumpet interchange
1.000 mi = 1.609 km; 1.000 km = 0.621 mi: Concurrency terminus

== See also ==
- FT34 Central Spine Road
