= Kuala Krai Bridge =

Kuala Krai Bridge Jambatan Gantung Sultan Ismail
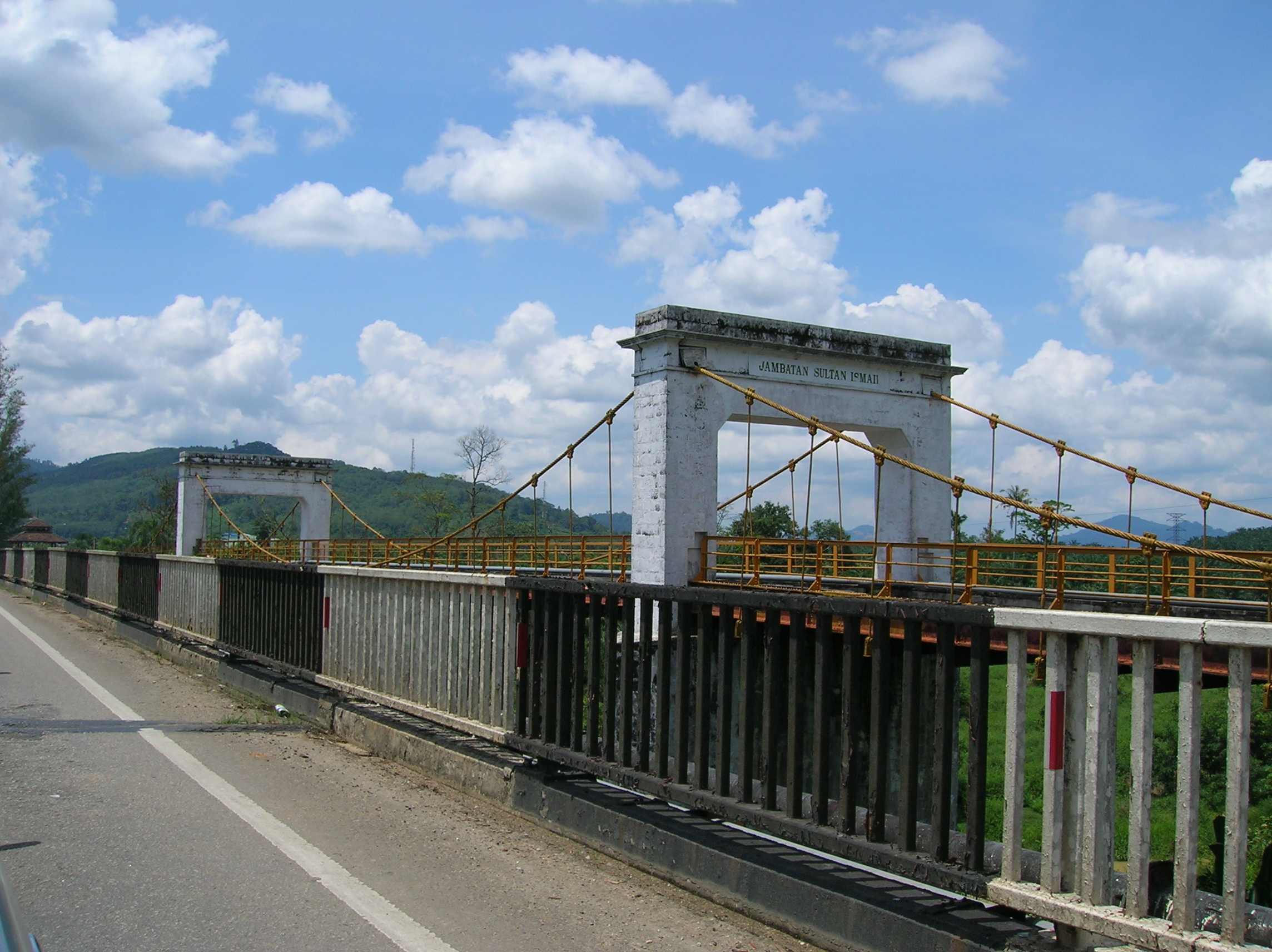
- Carries: Motor vehicles
- Crosses: Nal River
- Locale: Jalan Gua Musang-Kuala Krai
- Official name: Sultan Ismail Suspension Bridge
- Maintained by: Malaysian Public Works Department (JKR) Kuala Krai

Characteristics
- Design: suspension bridge
- Total length: --
- Width: --
- Longest span: --

History
- Designer: Malaysian Public Works Department (JKR)
- Constructed by: Malaysian Public Works Department (JKR)
- Opened: 1920s

Kuala Krai Bridge or Sultan Ismail Suspension Bridge is a historical bridge built by the British in the 1920s. It is located on Federal Route 8 near Kuala Krai, Kelantan, Malaysia.

== See also ==
- Transport in Malaysia
