= Sultan Ismail Petra Bridge =

Bridge in Malaysia

Kelantan River Second Bridge Jambatan Sultan Ismail Petra
- Coordinates: 6°03′23″N 102°12′47″E
- Carries: Motor vehicles
- Crosses: Kelantan River
- Locale: Federal Route 208 Tendong-Mulong Highway
- Official name: Sultan Ismail Petra Bridge
- Maintained by: Malaysian Public Works Department (JKR) Pasir Mas and Kota Bharu

Characteristics
- Design: box girder bridge
- Total length: --
- Width: --
- Longest span: --

History
- Designer: Government of Malaysia; Malaysian Public Works Department (JKR)
- Constructed by: Malaysian Public Works Department (JKR)
- Opened: 2003

Location
- Interactive map of Kelantan River Second Bridge

Sultan Ismail Petra Bridge (Malay: Jambatan Sultan Ismail Petra) is a second bridge in Kota Bharu, Kelantan, Malaysia crossing Kelantan River after Sultan Yahya Petra Bridge. It is located between Tendong in Pasir Mas and Kampung Chabang Tiga Pendek in Kota Bharu. The construction of the four lane bridge began in 2001, and was completed in 2003. The bridge was officially opened on 15 September 2003 by the Sultan of Kelantan, Sultan Ismail Petra ibni Almarhum Sultan Yahya Petra.

== See also ==
- Transport in Malaysia
