= Lurah Bilut =

Town in Bentong District, Pahang, Malaysia

Coordinates: 3°40′N 101°53′E

Lurah Bilut is a town in Bentong District, Pahang, Malaysia. It is the oldest estate town in the country and also a constituency of the Pahang State Legislative Assembly. It is located along Federal Route 8 en route to Raub. This estate town was established in 1960 by the Federal Land Development Authority (Felda).

The town has a Petronas gas station, bus station, and shops including a coffee shop which is more than 30 years old.

== Town in popular culture ==
=== Songs ===
- Cintaku Di Lurah Bilut - Faiz Akmal & The Band

=== Movies ===
- Bilut (2006)
