= Simpang Pelangai =

Town in Pahang, Malaysia

Coordinates: 3°10′35″N 102°11′37″E

Simpang Pelangai (Jawi: سيمڤڠ ڤلڠاي) is a small town in Bentong District, Pahang, Malaysia, located close to the border with Negeri Sembilan.

== Politics ==
The state legislative assembly constituency of Pelangai is represented by Amizar Abu Adam of the UMNO.

== Transportation ==
Simpang Pelangai is served by Federal Route FT 9, linking it to other major towns along the route like Karak in the north and Kuala Pilah and Tampin in the south. It is also will be served by Federal Route FT 34, also known as the Lingkaran Tengah Utama highway, which acts as an alternative route for east coasters to travel south to Negeri Sembilan, Malacca and Johor while bypassing Kuala Lumpur.
