= SK Bukit Tiu =

Bukit Tiu National School
- Sekolah Kebangsaan Bukit Tiu
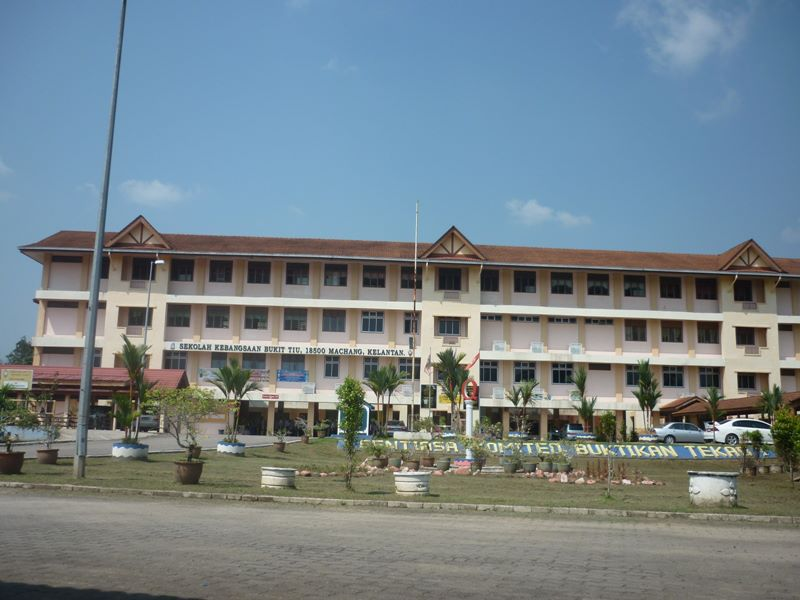

Location
- Jalan Pasir Puteh Lama, Kampung Bukit Tiu; Machang, Kelantan, 18500; Malaysia
- 5.76100°N 102.24375°E

Information
- School type: Co-ed National School, Primary Education
- Session: Morning
- School code: DBA2165
- Headmaster: Zakaria Ab Ghani
- Age: 5+
- Language: Malay
- Affiliations: Ministry of Education Malaysia

Sekolah Kebangsaan Bukit Tiu (SK Bukit Tiu) is a primary school local to the village of Bukit Tiu and surrounding areas. It is a part of the public national school system offering education for pre-schoolers and students from Year 1 to 6. The school also provides special education for students with special needs and learning difficulties.

The intake ranges around 350 every year. In 2009, enrollment was 345 with 185 male students and 160 female students. Sekolah Kebangsaan Bukit Tiu is staffed with 29 teachers.

== Facilities ==
The school consists of several buildings over the original site and the new section. Upon completion of the new site, the operational buildings will be migrated to the new section of the school. This section includes two blocks of four-storied buildings, a canteen, a new field, and a multi-purposed enclosed court.

The administration of the school is on the first floor of the main block where the headmaster's office and senior assistants offices are, as well as teachers room.

The school library was moved from its original location to the new section to make it more accessible for the students. Since a great majority of the teachers and students are Muslims, SK Bukit Tiu provides a dedicated prayer room and ablution facilities.

The school has a well-equipped Science laboratory and a Living Skills workshop. The computer laboratory was built in the old section after the migration and remained as the main computer lab.

Sports facilities are provided in both sections. A 200-metre running track and a multi-purpose field, which are used for hockey and football, are provided in the new section while the old section houses the main volleyball court.
