= Machang (town) =

Machang Machey (Kelantan-Pattani Malay)
- Town and district capital
- Coat of arms

- Peninsular Malaysia Machang (Malaysia)
- Coordinates: 5°45′39″N 102°12′57″E
- Country: Malaysia
- State: Kelantan
- District: Machang District
- Establistment: 1880
- Founder: Senik Awang Kecik

Government
  - Type: Local government
  - Body: Machang District Council
  - President: Zainudin Mohamed
  - Member of Parliament: Wan Ahmad Fayhsal Wan Ahmad Kamal

Area
  - Total: 130 km^{2} (50 sq mi)

Population (2010)
  - Total: 56,937
  - Density: 440/km^{2} (1,100/sq mi)
- Demonym: Machangster / Ughe Mache
- Time zone: UTC +8
- Postcode: 18XXX
- Area code: +609
- Vehicle registration: D
- Website: mdmachang.kelantan.gov.my

Machang District Council Majlis Daerah Machang

Type
- Type: Local authority

History
- Founded: 1 January 1979

Leadership
- President: Nik Mohd Hasanuddin Nik Hussain
- District secretary: Ahmad Hakim Harun

Meeting place
- Jalan Tok Kemuning, 18500 Machang, Kelantan Darul Naim.

Website
- mdmachang.kelantan.gov.my

Machang (Kelantanese: Machey) is a town in Machang District, Kelantan, Malaysia. It is a home to one of the main campuses of Universiti Teknologi MARA. Machang town is in between from Kuala Krai to Kota Bharu.

== History ==
Machang originated as a village of the same name, Kampung Machang. It was opened in 1880 by a group of settlers from Pasir Tumboh, Kota Bharu led by Senik Awang Kecik. On its inception, the territory was mainly economically agrarian with some of the population involved in commerce.

== Etymology ==
Machang is named after the Malay name for horse mango, machang (Mangifera foetida).

== Point of Interest ==
=== Cek Mek Molek Street Murals ===
Opened to public in 2015, Cek Mek Molek Street is the latest artistic installation of its kind within the territory. It was a previously an unkempt back alley before it was then transformed as an open mural gallery.

=== Leaning Minaret of Pulai Condong Mosque ===
The Minaret of Pulai Condong Mosque, a local flagship structure, was designed and built by Hj. Ab. Samad bin Hj. Abdullah in year 1856 (1273H). The minaret is also known as Pulai Condong Mosque Tower from a loose English translation from the Malay language.

Standing at 18 metres high and about 2.8 metres width, the minaret was built with an unroofed pole at its core which acts as an axis.

The minaret was said to be made in cooperation of hundreds of men. The structure is made from chengal wood by only adze (Malay: beliung), axe and chisel. The structural integrity of the minaret is really strong considering it is still standing after Kelantan was hit by a big flood and storm in 1880 (1297H). This minaret remained in a good condition today and still serving its original purpose as a place where muezzin calls out the call for prayers.

=== Bukit Bakar Recreational Forest ===
Bukir Bakar Recreational Forest or Hutan Lipur Bukit Bakar was first opened in 1975. It covers an area of 3.14 hectares, within the Ulu Sat Forest Reserve. This recreational forest is a perfect getaway, especially for families. The facilities within the area includes a children's playground, a number of rest areas and huts, a bathing pond, a hanging bridge, and restrooms, to improve visitors' appreciation of the flowing cool waters, flora and fauna, and intense forest greeneries. The site has a free entry for guests between 7am to 7pm. Campers, on the other hand, will need to get a permission from the Recreational Forest authorities, on behalf of the Kelantan State Forestry Director.

=== Jeram Linang Waterfall and Recreational Forest ===
Jeram Linang Waterfall was one of the first to be developed by the state. Located in the Ulu Sat Forest Reserve, its cool waters always crystal clear despite the location's popularity. The state government has provided facilities including public restrooms, rest areas, Muslim prayer facilities, restaurants and car park. Visitors to Jeram Linang come not only to bathe, but also to jungle trek, and pitch their tents up for an eco-friendly vacation at the camp site provided.

=== Guillemard Bridge ===
Guillemard Bridge is a railway bridge erected across Sungai Kelantan in Kusial near Tanah Merah. The bridge is the longest railway bridge in Malaysia. The construction began in year 1920 and completed in July 1924. When it was first opened, the bridge was used by all types of vehicles including trains and motor vehicles. It was inaugurated by Sir Laurence Nunns Guillemard at the behest of the then Sultan of Kelantan, HRH Sultan Ismail Ibni Al-Marhum Sultan Muhammad IV of Kelantan on 19 July 1924. The name "Guillemard" was taken from Sir Laurence Guillemard who was then the British Governor of Strait Settlements and High Commissioner of Malaya.

The bridge was detonated by the British troops on 9 and 12 December 1941 to slow down the advancement of Japanese military troops during the Japanese Invasion of Malaya before they retreated to Kuala Krai. Railway bridge was soon repaired and reopened to traffic on 7 September 1948. Upon the completion of a new bridge in a nearby area, Guillemard Bridge is now only used by trains and access to other vehicles is permanently closed.

=== Temangan Ore Mine ===
Temangan iron ore mine was operated by Oriental Mining Co., a Japanese company in Bukit Besi, Temangan. Once extracted, the iron ores were transported by train to Tumpat Harbour. The iron ore then put into a special container where it would be transported aboard a ship to be exported to Japan.

During the Japanese Invasion of Malaya (1941-1945) iron ore production was continued by the Japanese army. After World War II, iron ore was still in production, committed by same company albeit under British government surveillance. Its production persists up to year 1965 where its operation stopped due to depletion of the mine resources.

Since its closure, the Jambatan Bijih was then abandoned and it was not managed properly. The remains that can be seen as of today is an aftermath from its collapse. One of the areas that were later developed in its place is Sekolah Kebangsaan Temangan, a national school.

=== Rengas Hot Spring ===
Rengas Hot Spring is located in Kampong Rengas, Labok about 20 kilometres away from Bandar Machang. It is near to Tok Bok's state road en route to Selising, Pasir Puteh. The temperature of the hot spring is relatively high as compared to other hot springs within Kelantan state. Its area beset trees' greenness and paddy field.

== Notable people ==
1. Dato' Dr. Hasmiza Othman, also known as "Dato' Seri Vida" and Pink Lady, a successful businesswoman was born in Machang and study at Chinese primary school and Universiti Sains Malaysia. Her company, Vida Beauty, is currently the sponsor for Kelantan FA for 2016 and 2017.
