= Chegar Perah railway station =

Railway station in Malaysia

Coordinates: 4°29′26″N 102°56′43″E

Chegar Perah

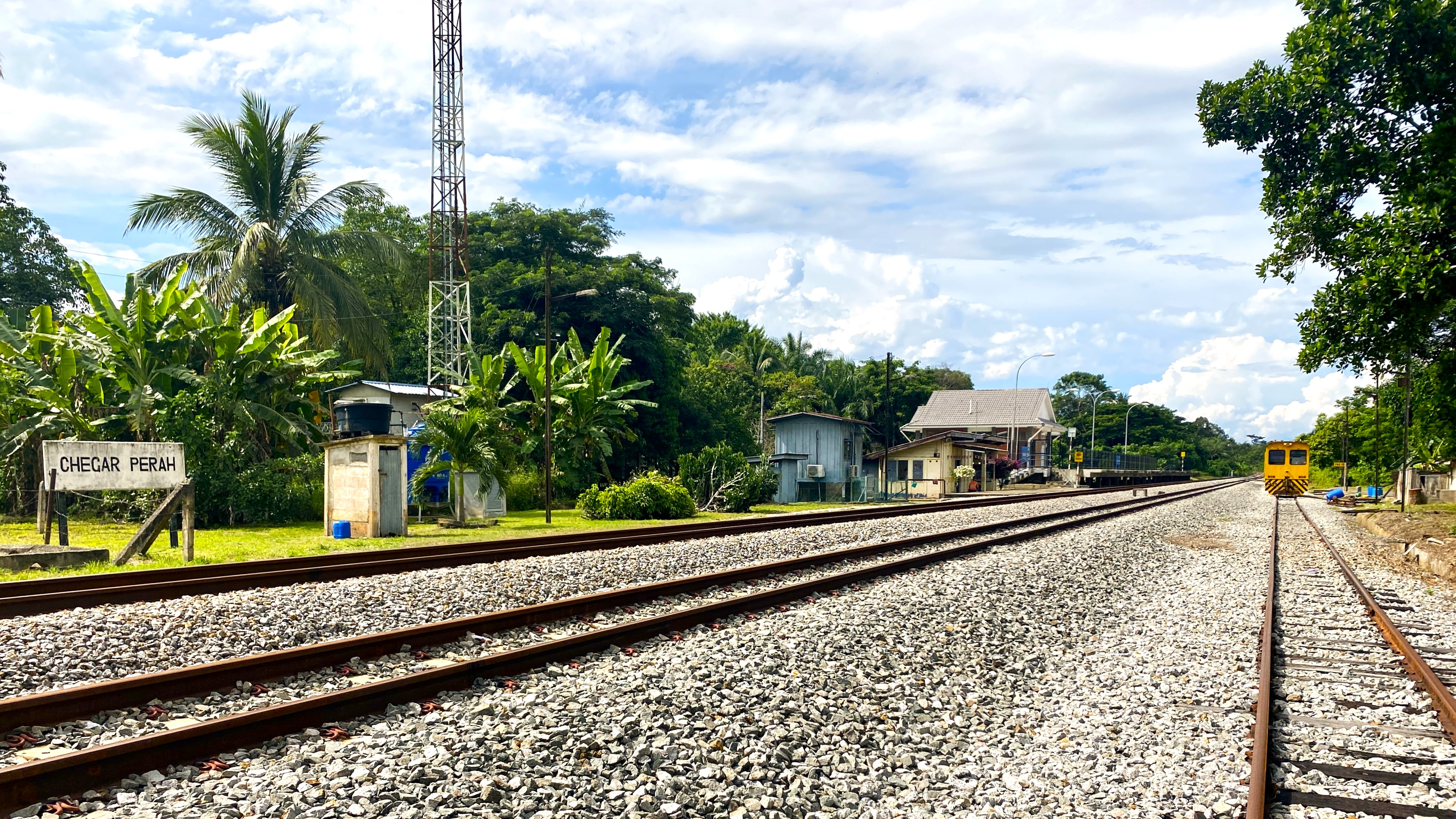
- Chegar Perah Railway Station

General information
- Other names: Malay: چݢر ڤره (Jawi); Chinese: 仄加柏拉; Tamil: செகார் பேரா
- Location: Chegar Perah; Pahang; Malaysia
- System: KTM Intercity
- Owner: Railway Assets Corporation
- Operator: Keretapi Tanah Melayu
- Line: East Coast Line
- Platforms: 1 side platform
- Tracks: 3

Construction
- Parking: Available, free.
- Accessible: Y

Services
Preceding station	Keretapi Tanah Melayu (Intercity)	Following station
Sungai Temau towards Tumpat	Shuttle Timur	Aur Gading Halt towards Kuala Lipis
Sungai Temau towards Gua Musang	Shuttle Timur	Aur Gading Halt towards Kuala Lipis
Location

The Chegar Perah railway station is a Malaysian train station located at and named after the town of Chegar Perah in the Lipis District of the state of Pahang.
