= Manek Urai =

Town in Kelantan, Malaysia

Coordinates: 5°23′N 102°14′E

Manek Urai is a small town in Kuala Krai District, Kelantan, Malaysia.

== See also ==
- Manek Urai by-election, 2009
