= Kampung Pahi =

Coordinates: 5.471°N 102.223°E

Kampung Pahi is a village in Kuala Krai District in the state of Kelantan, Malaysia.
