= Federal Land Development Authority =

Malaysian government agency

Federal Land Development Authority (Felda)
- Lembaga Kemajuan Tanah Persekutuan
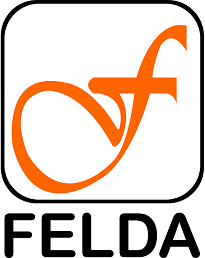
- Current Felda logo adopted since 2004

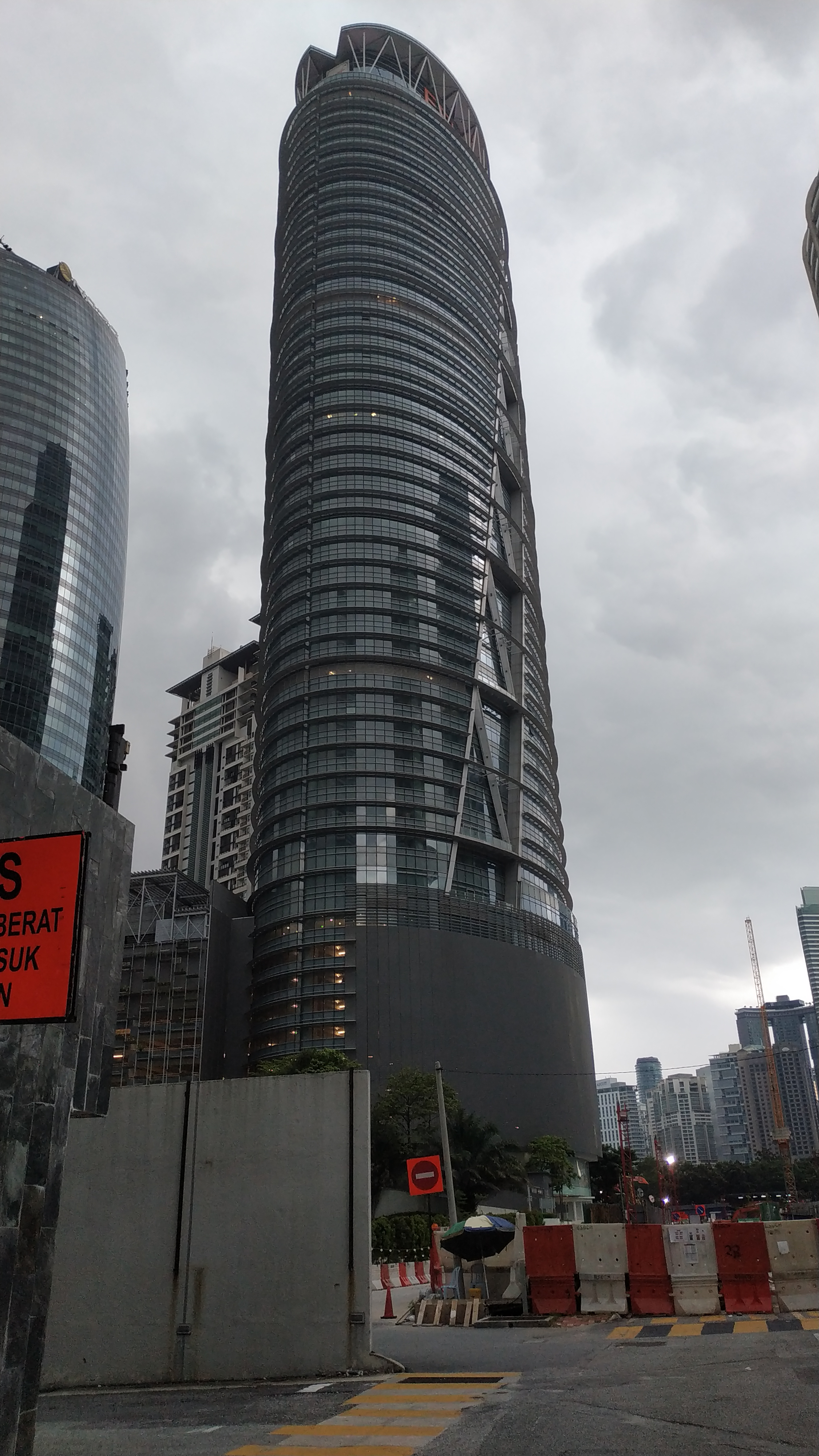
- Felda Tower in Kuala Lumpur, Malaysia.

Government agency overview
- Formed: 6 July 1956; 70 years ago
- Jurisdiction: Malaysia
- Headquarters: Felda Tower, Platinum Park, No. 11, Persiaran KLCC, 50088 Kuala Lumpur, Malaysia
- Government agency executives: Ahmad Badri Mohd Zahir, Chairman; Amiruddin Abdul Satar, Director General
- Parent Government agency: Prime Minister's Department
- Website: www.felda.gov.my

The Federal Land Development Authority (Felda; Malay: Lembaga Kemajuan Tanah Persekutuan, LKTP) is a Malaysian government agency that was founded to handle the resettlement of rural poor into newly developed areas (colonies, settlements or schemes) and to organize smallholder farms growing cash crops.

Since the 1990s, it has not established new settlements, but has engaged in a diversified range of economic development and business activities.

Felda has launched a number of private corporate entities. The largest of these, FGV Holdings Berhad, is considered to be the world's largest plantation operator, with 811,140 hectares (2,004,400 acres) of oil palm plantations, mainly across Peninsular Malaysia, but also including other parts of Malaysia and the world.

== History ==
Felda was formed on 1 July 1956 when the Land Development Act came into force. The first Felda colony was opened at Lurah Bilut, near Bentong in western Pahang in 1958, comprising 2946.88 ha (29.4688 km²) of land and focused on rubber. In the 1960s and 1970s, government policy began to emphasize crop diversification, in an effort to avoid being affected if the world price of rubber were to drop precipitously. In 1961, Felda's first oil palm settlement opened, with 3.75 square kilometres (1.45 sq mi) of land. Oil palm gradually became the main cash crop within Felda colonies, and by 2000, 6,855.2 square kilometres (2,646.8 sq mi) (approximately 76%) of the land under Felda's programs are devoted to oil palms.

More than 112,000 settlers were resettled in Felda colonies throughout Malaysia between 1958 and 1990.

No new colonies have been established since 1990; acceptance of new settlers or colonists also ceased that year. The latest colony to be developed was Sahabat II in Lahad Datu, eastern Sabah. The Malaysian government converted Felda into a statutory body in 1996, granting it financial autonomy.

Felda focuses mainly on West Malaysia (Peninsular Malaysia); other government agencies are responsible for land development in the states of Sabah and Sarawak, which form East Malaysia.

== Scheme management ==
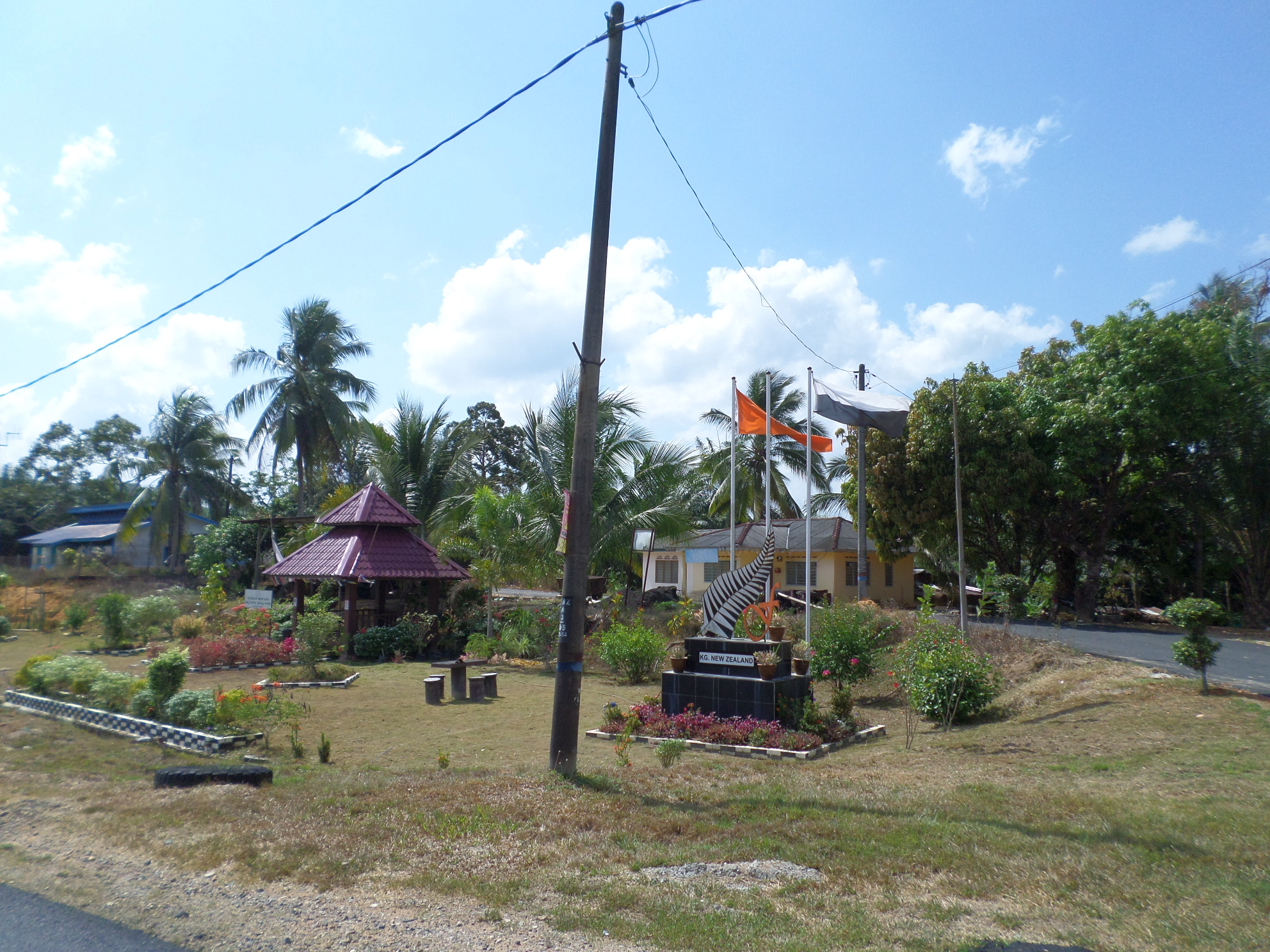
Felda New Zealand in Pahang

Settlers were drawn from rural Malay poor. They were to be aged between 21 and 50 years, married, and physically fit. Priority was given to those who did not own any land to farm.

New settlers were assigned to a particular settlement, and were given 10 acres (4.0 ha), 12 acres (4.9 ha) or 14 acres (5.7 ha) of land to cultivate usually either rubber or oil palms. All settlers were required to reside at the settlement itself, and were allotted .25 acres (0.10 ha) in a planned village, where their home—already built by Felda—was located. Although basic infrastructure, such as water supply and electricity, used to be lacking, nowadays such facilities are readily provided. Schools, medical centres, and places of worship are also provided.

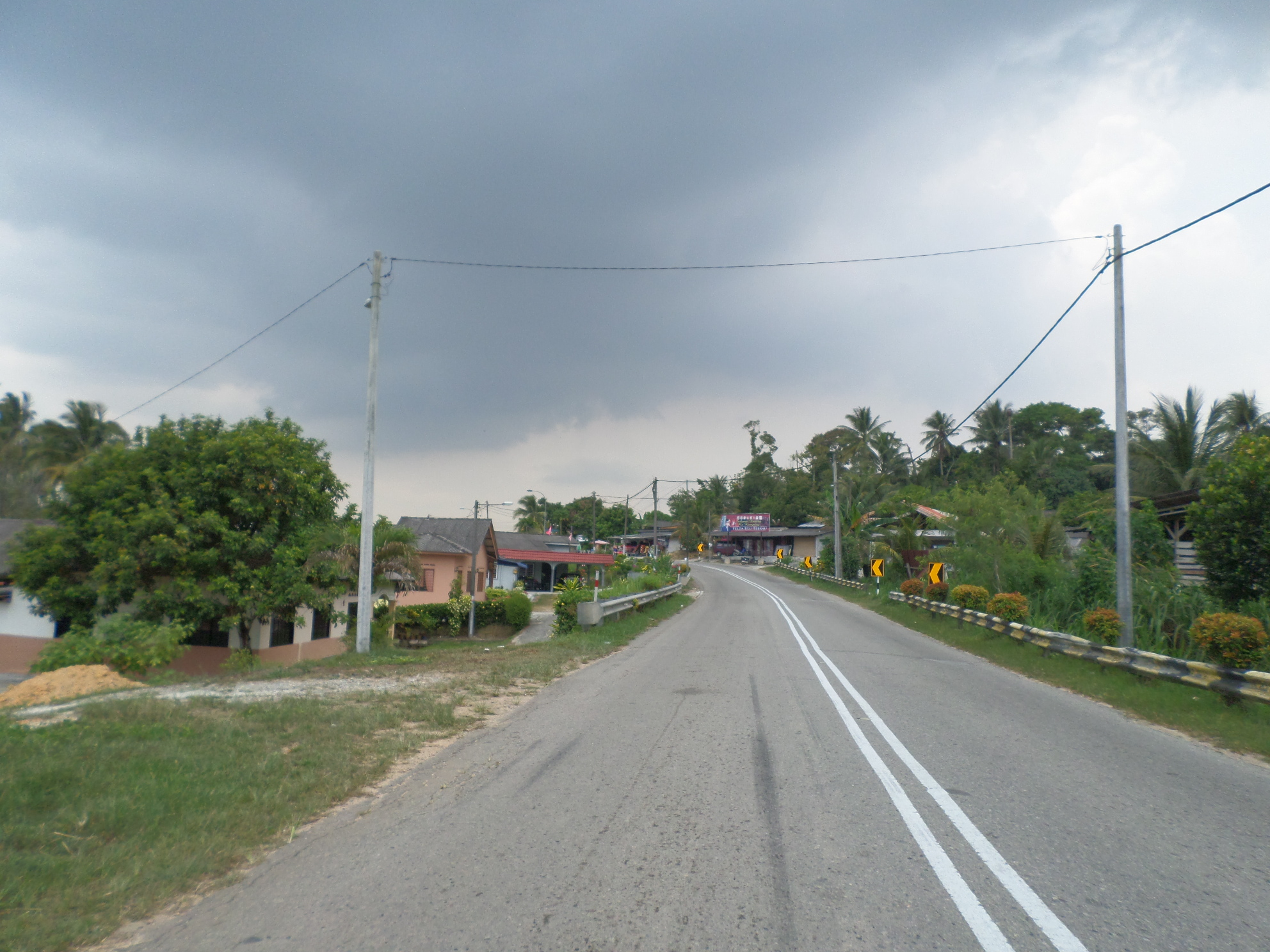
Felda Ulu Tebrau in Johor

Originally, Felda schemes were designed as co-operatives, where instead of each settler owning a defined piece of land, each settler held an equal share in the ownership of the particular scheme. However, the settlers did not prefer this scheme, as workers who did not tend to the land properly still benefited (a sort of free rider problem). The government then set up a 3-phase plan, where in the first phase, the co-operative remained as a mechanism for the settlers to learn how to farm. In the second phase, each settler was given a specific plot of land to work, and in the third phase, he was given the land title to that plot. However, the settler was forbidden from selling the land without permission from Felda or the Federal Government.

The costs of acquiring, developing and allocating the land are borne by loans made to Felda settlers. These loans are repaid in monthly instalments deducted from the settlers' income over a 15-year period.

Although settlers are supposed to focus on agricultural activities, it has been reported that a substantial number are also engaged in other activities, such as shopkeeping. Some are even employed in jobs outside the settlement.

In recent years, the growth of urban areas has led to a substantial increase in the land value of some settlements. With permission, many settlers have sold their farms, becoming instant millionaires.

== Diversification and corporate ventures ==
Felda has diversified from its original business of land development, to other economic ventures—some of them entirely unrelated to land resettlement. The ventures include Koperasi Permodalan Felda (KPF) and FGV Holdings Berhad. In June 2012, FGV Holdings Berhad raised $3.1 billion from its IPO as the biggest IPO in Asia for year to date.

== Other information ==
Map of FELDA settlements in Peninsular Malaysia

- Pahang contains the largest number of Felda colonies, centered around the Jengka scheme in central Pahang. With 43,000 settlers, Pahang is also home to the largest population of settlers. There are colonies in every parliamentary constituency in Pahang, except Kuantan, the state capital, and Indera Mahkota.
- 57 parliamentary constituencies contain at least one Felda colony – 54 in peninsular Malaysia and 3 in Sabah.
- Penang, Sarawak and the Federal Territories are the only states that have no permanent Felda colonies – though FELDA operates a sugar refinery in Seberang Perai, Penang.

== In Sarawak ==
Felda did not have a significant presence in Sarawak. There is only one Felda project in Sarawak, which is located at Kampung Sampadi, Lundu District, near Kuching. However, this project differs from typical Felda colonies in peninsular Malaysia that local villagers who are hired to work here were not allocated with or resettled to any of the lands worked on, unlike their counterparts in West Malaysia.

Oil palm development in Sarawak is under the purview of Sarawak Ministry of Land Development (MLDS) and Sarawak Ministry of Rural Development (MRDS). Meanwhile, Sarawak Ministry of Planning and Resource Management is responsible for land administration. There are two statutory bodies responsible of oil palm development, namely Sarawak Land Consolidation and Rehabilitation Authority (SALCRA) and the Land Custody and Development Authority (LCDA). SALCRA uses a model of two-way partnership between the state agency and native land owners. Meanwhile, LCDA uses a joint venture model involving state agency, native land owners, and private investors.

== In popular culture ==
- In 2006, Felda had produced its first movie, Bilut, named after the first Felda settlement ever in Malaysia. Starring Rosyam Nor, the main plot of Bilut is about the obstacles faced by the early settlers of Felda Lurah Bilut.
