= Salor =

Electoral district in Kelantan, Malaysia

Salor (N17)
Kelantan constituency

State constituency
- Legislature: Kelantan State Legislative Assembly
MLA
Saizol Ismail
PN
- Constituency created: 1974
- First contested: 1974
- Last contested: 2023

Demographics
- Electors (2023): 36,294

Salor is a state constituency in Kelantan, Malaysia, that has been represented in the Kelantan State Legislative Assembly.

The state constituency was first contested in 1974 and is mandated to return a single Assemblyman to the Kelantan State Legislative Assembly under the first-past-the-post voting system.

== Demographics ==
As of 2020, Salor has a population of 43,530 people.

Ethnic breakdown of Salor's electorate as of 2023
1. Malay (98.1%)
2. Chinese (1.46%)
3. Other ethnicities (0.36%)
4. Indian (0.08%)

== History ==
=== Polling districts ===
According to the Gazette issued on 30 March 2018, the Salor constituency has a total of 16 polling districts.

State Constituency	Polling Districts	Code	Location
Salor (N17）	Wakaf Zain	024/17/01	SK Pendek
Salor (N17）	Kota Selatan	024/17/02	SK Seri Kota
Salor (N17）	Pendek	024/17/03	SK Pendek
Salor (N17）	Larak	024/17/04	SK Mulong (2)
Salor (N17）	Mulong	024/17/05	SMK Mulong
Salor (N17）	Telok Kandis	024/17/06	SMK Salor
Salor (N17）	Salor	024/17/07	SMK Salor
Salor (N17）	Kampung Kubang Rawa	024/17/08	SK Salor
Salor (N17）	Seberang Pasir Mas	024/17/09	SK Seberang Pasir Mas
Salor (N17）	Pengkalan Kubor	024/17/10	SK Pengkalan Kubor Salor
Salor (N17）	Dewan	024/17/11	SMK Dewan Beta
Salor (N17）	Beta Hilir	024/17/12	SK Dewan Beta
Salor (N17）	Lubok Jambu	024/17/13	SK Mulong
Salor (N17）	Kampung Kor	024/17/14	SK Kor
Salor (N17）	Beta Hulu	024/17/15	SK Beta Hulu
Salor (N17）	Kedai Piah	024/17/16	SK Kedai Piah

=== Representation History ===
Members of the Legislative Assembly for Salor
Assembly	No	Years	Member	Party
Constituency created from Kota Bharu Selatan
4th	N19	1974–1978	Abdul Rahman Awang Sulong	BN (PAS)
5th	N19	1978–1982	Sofian Awang	BERJASA
6th	N19	1982–1986	Mustapha Ibrahim	PAS
7th	N16	1986–1990	Zaleha Hussin	BN (UMNO)
8th	N16	1990–1995	Ahmad Rusli Iberahim	S46
9th	N16	1995–1999	Ahmad Rusli Iberahim	S46
10th	N16	1999–2004	Buni Amin Hamzah	PAS
11th	N17	2004–2008	Buni Amin Hamzah	PAS
12th	N17	2008–2013	Husam Musa	PR (PAS)
13th	N17	2013–2016	Husam Musa	PR (PAS)
13th	N17	2016–2018	Husam Musa	AMANAH
14th	N17	2018–2020	Saiful Adli Abu Bakar	PAS
14th	N17	2020–2023	Saiful Adli Abu Bakar	PN (PAS)
15th	N17	2023–present	Saizol Ismail	PN (PAS)

== Election results ==
Kelantan state election, 2023: Salor
Party	Candidate	Votes	%	∆%
PAS	Saizol Ismail	15,893	71.19	▲18.73
BN	Mohamad Husain	6,433	28.81	▼1.80
Total valid votes		22,326	100.00	
Total rejected ballots		159		
Unreturned ballots		60		
Turnout		22,545	62.12	▼18.27
Registered electors		36,294		
Majority		9,460	42.38	▲20.54
PAS hold		Swing		

Kelantan state election, 2018: Salor
Party	Candidate	Votes	%	∆%
PAS	Saiful Adli Abd Bakar	11,206	52.46	▼8.52
BN	Mohamad Noordin Awang	6,540	30.61	▼8.41
PKR	Husam Musa	3,617	16.93	▲16.93
Total valid votes		21,363	100.00	
Total rejected ballots		215		
Unreturned ballots		258		
Turnout		21,836	80.39	▼4.81
Registered electors		27,164		
Majority		4,666	21.84	▼0.12
PAS hold		Swing		

Kelantan state election, 2013: Salor
Party	Candidate	Votes	%	∆%
PAS	Husam Musa	10,231	60.98	▼1.06
BN	Mohamad Noordin Awang	6,548	39.02	▲1.06
Total valid votes		16,779	100.00	
Total rejected ballots		196		
Unreturned ballots		67		
Turnout		17,049	85.20	▲2.54
Registered electors		20,011		
Majority		3,683	21.96	▼2.12
PAS hold		Swing		

Kelantan state election, 2008: Salor
Party	Candidate	Votes	%	∆%
PAS	Husam Musa	8,329	62.04	▲7.38
BN	Ismail Mamat	5,097	37.96	▼7.38
Total valid votes		13,426	100.00	
Total rejected ballots		186		
Unreturned ballots		50		
Turnout		13,662	82.66	▲0.76
Registered electors		16,528		
Majority		3,232	24.08	▲14.76
PAS hold		Swing		

Kelantan state election, 2004: Salor
Party	Candidate	Votes	%	∆%
PAS	Buni Amin Hamzah	6,641	54.66	▼13.38
BN	Zaleha Hussin	5,508	45.34	▲13.38
Total valid votes		12,149	100.00	
Total rejected ballots		415		
Unreturned ballots		0		
Turnout		12,563	81.90	▲4.69
Registered electors		15,340		
Majority		1,133	9.32	▼26.76
PAS hold		Swing		

Kelantan state election, 1999: Salor
Party	Candidate	Votes	%	∆%
PAS	Buni Amin Hamzah	7,543	68.04	▲68.04
BN	Ahmad Rusli Ibrahim	3,543	31.96	▼8.61
Total valid votes		11,086	100.00	
Total rejected ballots		273		
Unreturned ballots		18		
Turnout		11,378	77.21	▲0.65
Registered electors		14,736		
Majority		4,000	36.08	▲17.92
PAS gain from S46		Swing		?

Kelantan state election, 1995: Salor
Party	Candidate	Votes	%	∆%
S46	Ahmad Rusli Iberahim	6,076	58.73	▼5.92
BN	Zaleha Hussin	4,197	40.57	▲6.50
KITA	Ab Rahman Ibrahim	73	0.70	▲0.70
Total valid votes		10,346	100.00	
Total rejected ballots		239		
Unreturned ballots		38		
Turnout		10,623	76.56	▼5.10
Registered electors		13,876		
Majority		1,879	18.16	▼12.42
S46 hold		Swing		

Kelantan state election, 1990: Salor
Party	Candidate	Votes	%	∆%
S46	Ahmad Rusli Iberahim	6,956	64.65	▲64.65
BN	Zaleha Hussin	3,666	34.07	▼21.22
Independent	Zakaria Yussof	137	1.28	▲1.28
Total valid votes		10,759	100.00	
Total rejected ballots		334		
Unreturned ballots		0		
Turnout		11,093	81.66	▲3.67
Registered electors		13,584		
Majority		3,290	30.58	▲20.00
S46 gain from BN		Swing		?

Kelantan state election, 1986: Salor
Party	Candidate	Votes	%	∆%
BN	Zaleha Hussin	4,872	55.29	▲55.29
PAS	Ibrahim Isa	3,939	44.71	▼7.65
Total valid votes		8,811	100.00	
Total rejected ballots		350		
Unreturned ballots		0		
Turnout		9,161	77.99	
Registered electors		11,747	▼4.65	
Majority		933	10.58	▲5.87
BN gain from PAS		Swing		?

Kelantan state election, 1982: Salor
Party	Candidate	Votes	%	∆%
PAS	Mustapha Ibrahim	5,528	52.36	▲15.19
Independent	Muhamad Tahar Jalaadin Husin	5,030	47.64	▲47.64
Total valid votes		10,558	100.00	
Total rejected ballots		186		
Unreturned ballots		0		
Turnout		10,744	82.63	▲4.12
Registered electors		13,002		
Majority		498	4.72	▼20.95
PAS gain from BERJASA		Swing		-

Kelantan state election, 1978: Salor
Party	Candidate	Votes	%	∆%
Pan-Malaysian Islamic Front	Mohamad Surian	5,150	62.84	▲62.84
PAS	Hassan Mohamed	3,046	37.16	▼44.20
Total valid votes		8,196	100.00	
Total rejected ballots		123		
Unreturned ballots		0		
Turnout		8,319	78.52	▲4.17
Registered electors		10,595		
Majority		2,104	25.67	▼37.06
Pan-Malaysian Islamic Front gain from BN		Swing		-

Kelantan state election, 1974: Salor
Party	Candidate	Votes	%
BN	Ab. Rahman Awang Sulong	5,624	81.37
Independent	Zakaria Yusof	1,288	18.63
Total valid votes		6,912	100.00
Total rejected ballots		652	
Unreturned ballots		0	
Turnout		7,564	74.35
Registered electors		10,174	
Majority		4,336	62.73
This was a new constituency created.
