= Kelantan River =

River in Kelantan, Malaysia

Coordinates: 6°13′N 102°14′E

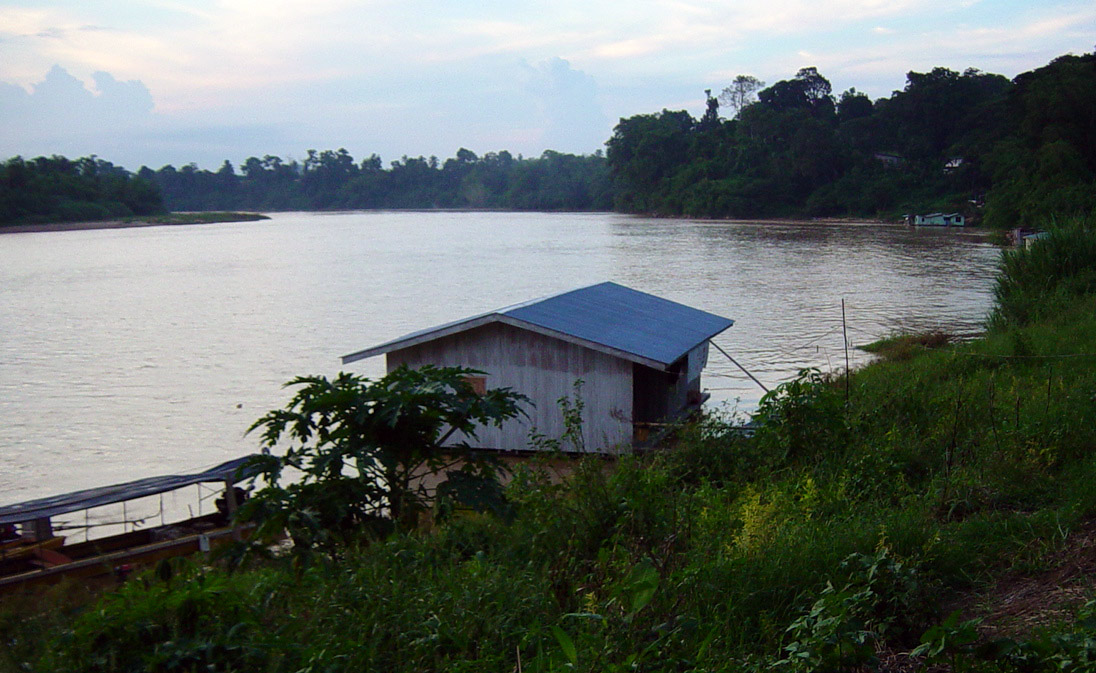
- The Kelantan River in Kuala Krai (about 70 km or 43 mi inland from the river estuary) in Sep 2005. In Nov-Feb the river can rise over 8 m (26 ft) above its normal level and flood the town.
- Native name: Sungai Kelantan (Malay)

Location
- Country: Malaysia
- State: Kelantan

Physical characteristics
- Source: Galas River
  - location: southwestern Gua Musang District
- 2nd source: Lebir River
  - location: Kuala Koh, southeastern Gua Musang District (Kelantanese section of Taman Negara)
- Source confluence: Kuala Krai, Kuala Krai District
- Mouth: South China Sea
  - location: Tumpat and Kota Bharu Districts
  - elevation: 0 m (0 ft)
- Length: 248 km (154 mi)
- Discharge
  - average: 557.5 m^{3}/s (19,690 cu ft/s)

The Kelantan River (Malay: Sungai Kelantan, Kelantanese: Sunga Klate) is a major river in Kelantan, Malaysia. Its drainage basin is about 11,900 km² in northeast Malaysia, including part of the Taman Negara, and flows northwards into the South China Sea. The rainfall over the area varies between 0 mm in the dry season (March–May) to 1,750 mm in the monsoon season (November–January). The average runoff from the area is about 500 m³/s. It is the second longest river in the east coast region and fourth longest river in Peninsular Malaysia behind the Pahang, Perak and Muar, at the length of 248 kilometres (154 mi).

== Name and extent ==
The description of the river is complicated by the local naming convention: instead of using the name Kelantan river from estuary to source, the name is only used for the section from the estuary to the confluence of its two main tributaries, the Galas River and the Lebir River, near the town of Kuala Krai. The same naming convention applies to these tributaries. Thus to describe the main river from source to mouth involves four names: the River Betis (first 20 miles from the source), then the River Nenggiri, then the River Galas, and finally the Kelantan River.

== Course ==
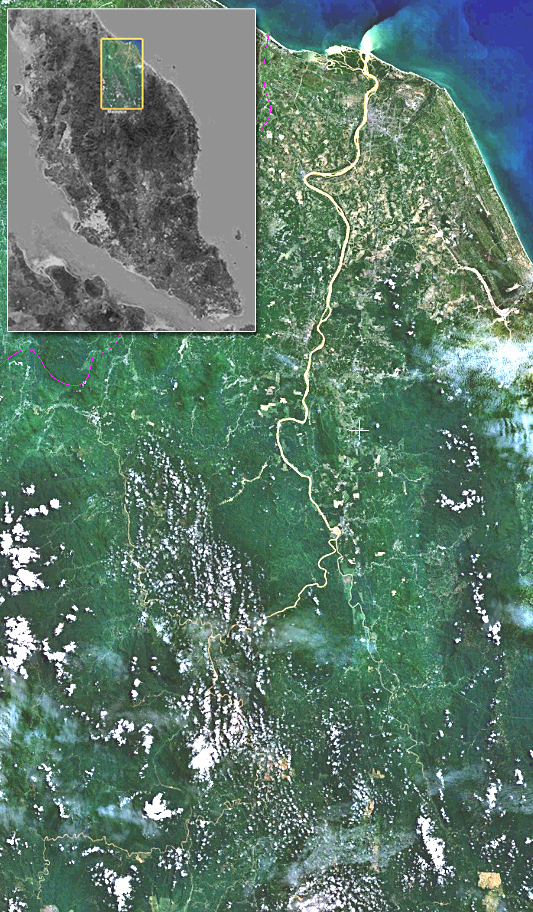
Satellite view of the Kelantan River basin (Landsat 7 viewed using NASA World Wind software)

The river's tributaries rise in the forested mountains in the Gua Musang region in southern Kelantan, where many Orang Asli tribes live. The area is known for its karst topography, dotted with mogotes with numerous caves beneath them. Some cave systems along the Nenggiri River, the river's left tributary, show evidence of habitation going back to 9000 years ago, such as Gua Cha near Kuala Betis.

Lower down, Malay villages dot the banks of the river which passes through one of the most densely populated floodplains in Peninsular Malaysia whose paddy fields produce around 12% of the Malaysian rice production.

The river flows past seven important towns, from south to north: Kuala Krai, Tanah Merah, Machang, Pasir Mas, Tumpat, the state capital Kota Bharu, as well as Pengkalan Chepa, Towards the estuary the river forms a delta that spans the districts of Tumpat and Kota Bharu.

The area around the actual estuary, known as Kuala Besar, is dotted with picturesque fishing villages, which are also well known for the production of batik (a local patterned material produced by waxing and dyeing cloth) for which Kelantan is famed for. The mouth of the Kelantan River is also infamous for being the site where Japanese troops first landed during their invasion of Malaya in December 1941.

== Flooding ==
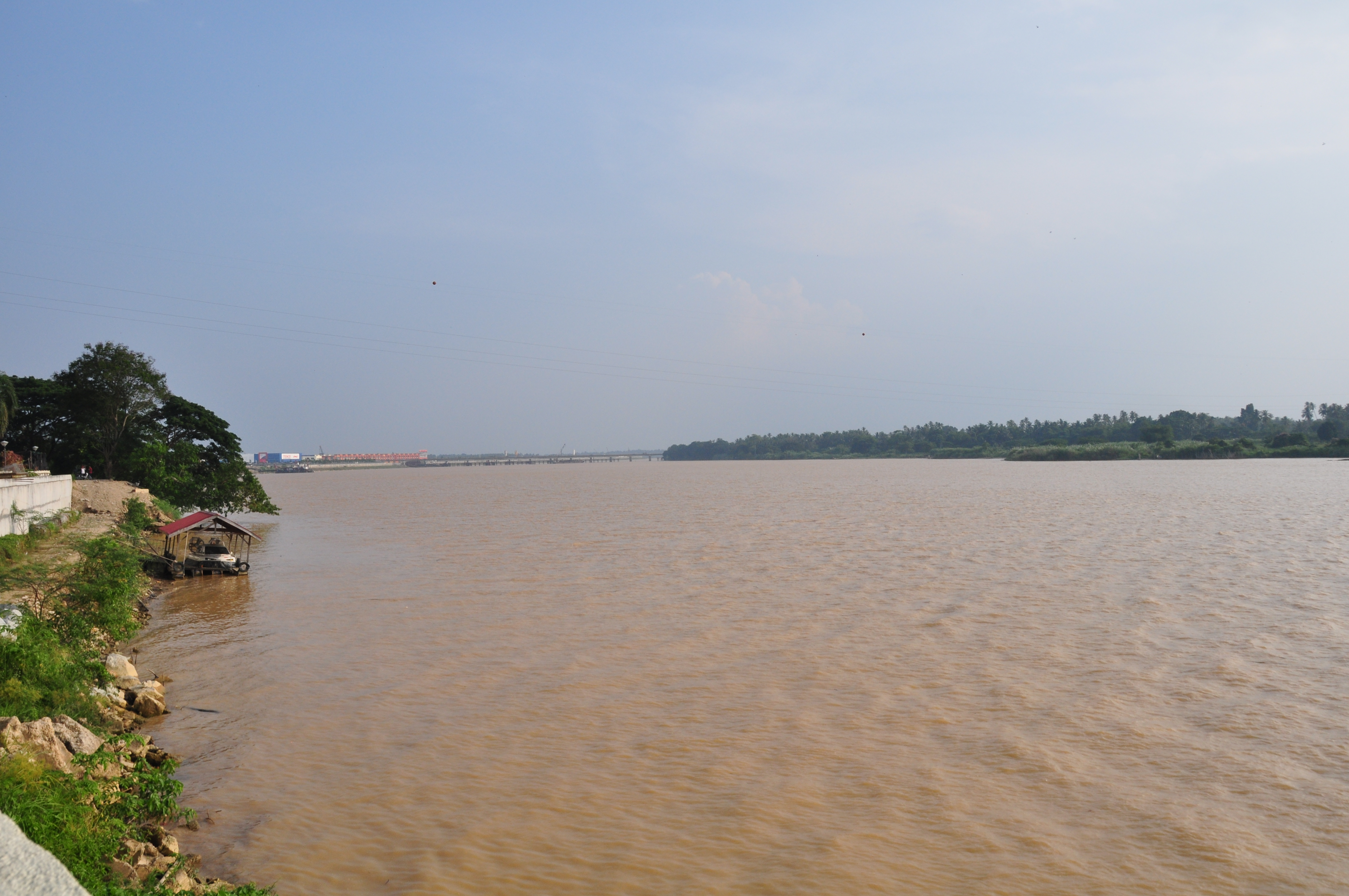
The Kelantan near its delta, Kota Bharu.

The Kelantan River regularly overspills its banks during the months of November to February because of the northeast monsoon season. The estimate flood volume under the 50 year flood condition at Kusial Bridge is about 6 billion m^{3}. Severe flooding occurred in 1926 and 1967. In the 1967 floods 84% of the Kelantan population (537,000 people) were badly affected. Some 125,000 people were evacuated and 38 drowned.

More recently a telemetric flood forecasting system has been installed to give warning of high river levels. Some of the worst floods in recent years have been:

Flood impact in Kelantan
| Year | Evacuees | Deaths | Damage (US$1000) |
|---|---|---|---|
| 2004 | 10476 | 12 | 3767 |
| 2003 | 2228 | 2 | 1461 |
| 2001 | 5800 | 0 | 2227 |
| 1993 | 13587 | 0 | 398 |
| 1988 | 41059 | 0 | ? |
| 1986 | 7963 | 0 | 1603 |
| 1983 | 33815 | 0 | ? |

== See also ==
- List of rivers of Malaysia
