= Wakaf Che Yeh =

Coordinates: 6.088°N 102.238°E

- Suburb of Kota Bharu
- Interactive map of Wakaf Che Yeh
- Country: Malaysia
- State: Kelantan
- District: Kota Bharu District
- Local area government: Kota Bharu Municipal Council (MPKB)

Wakaf Che Yeh is a suburb in Kelantan, Malaysia, in the southern part of Kota Bharu's metropolitan area. It is located about 7 km (4 mi) from downtown Kota Bharu along the Kuala Krai Highway Federal Route 8.

The town is famous for its daily and weekly market. A small supermarket can also be found at the area. RTM's Kelantan representative office is in the suburb.
