= Kuala Krai District =

Kuala Krai District Kkeghe (Kelantan–Pattani Malay)
- District of Kelantan
- Jajahan Kuala Krai
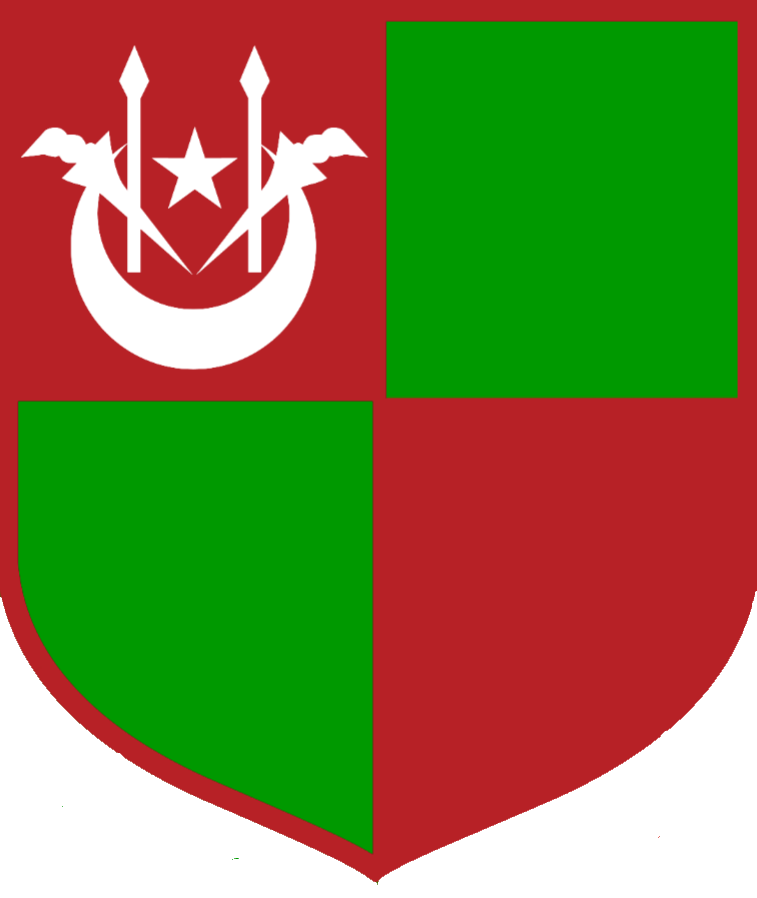
- Flag Coat of arms

- Location of Kuala Krai District in Kelantan
- Interactive map of Kuala Krai District
- Location of Kuala Krai District in Malaysia
- Coordinates: 5°30′N 102°10′E
- Country: Malaysia
- State: Kelantan
- Seat: Kuala Krai
- Local area government(s): Kuala Krai District Council (North Kuala Krai); Dabong District Council (South Kuala Krai)

Government
  - District officer: Haji Tengku Ab Rahman bin Tuan Yunus
  - Administrative office: Kuala Krai Land and District Office

Area
  - Total: 2,275 km^{2} (878 sq mi)

Population (2021)
  - Total: 105,900
  - Density: 46.55/km^{2} (120.6/sq mi)
- Time zone: UTC+8 (MST)
  - Summer (DST): UTC+8 (Not observed)
- Postcode: 18xxx
- Calling code: +6-09-9
- Vehicle registration plates: D

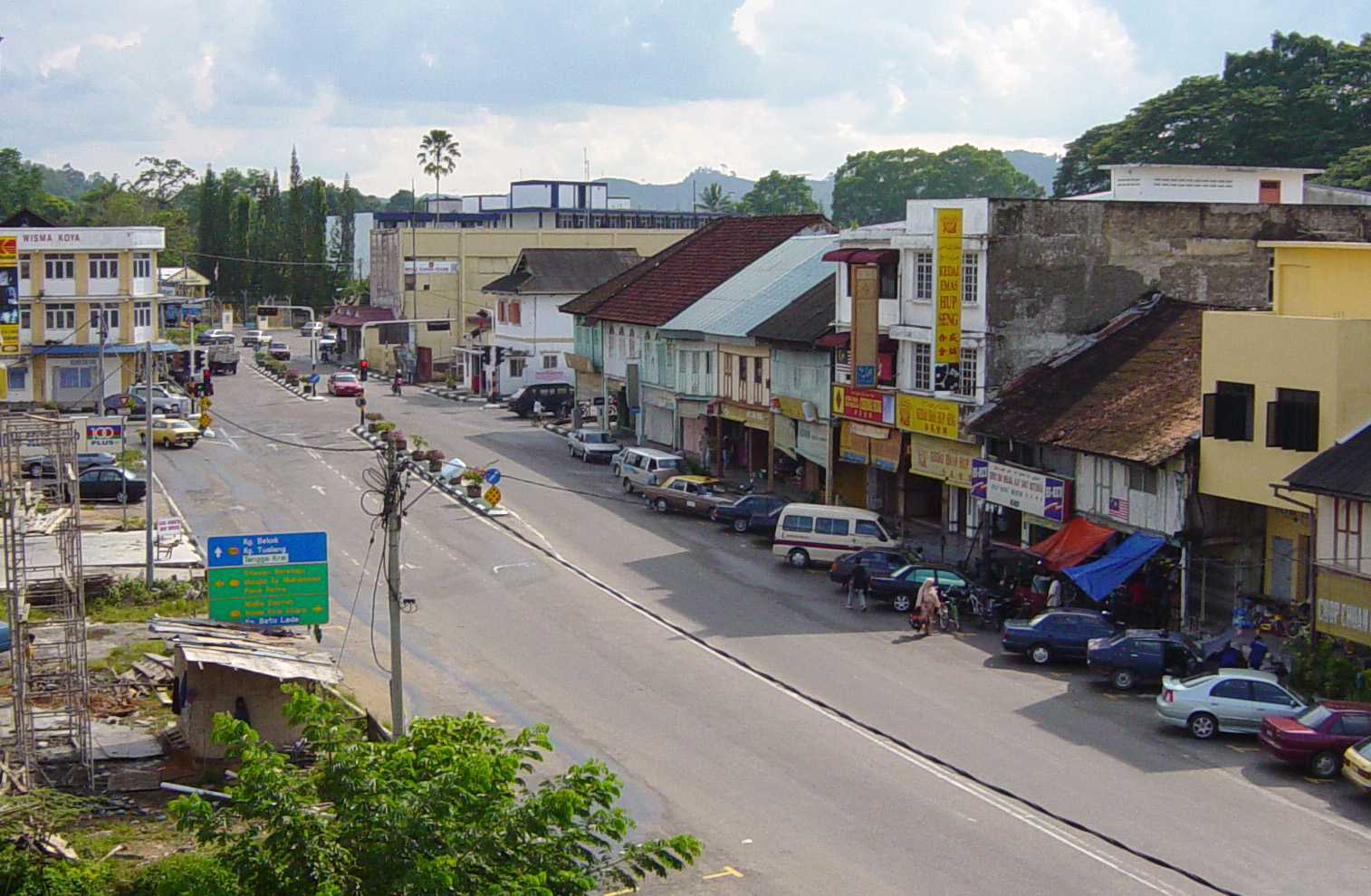
Kuala Krai

Kuala Krai (Kelantanese: Jajahey Kkeghe) is a district (jajahan) in Kelantan, Malaysia. Historically, it was known as Kuala Lebir.

== Background ==
The Kuala Krai district is a landlocked district in the centre of the State of Kelantan in northeastern Malaysia. The land is hilly, and before the 20th century the entire area was tropical rain forest. The territory contains the confluence of two major rivers, the Lebir and Galas, to form the Kelantan River, which then flows some 70 km northwards through one of the most densely populated flood plains on the Malay Peninsula to its estuary in the South China Sea near the State capital of Kota Bharu.

Kuala Krai was the most affected district in Kelantan by a massive 2014 flood known as Bah Kuning that resulted in property loses and in the federal government declaring a State of Emergency. This catastrophic event was cushioned by great societal support and aid from NGOs.

As transport links improved during the 20th century, people moved into the area to take advantage of the abundant land available for farming. A railway was constructed in the 1920s through the undeveloped interior of Malaysia to link Kelantan State with the main centres of population on the west coast. This line ran through Kuala Krai territory, and settlements became established along the route. Road links followed, and towns and villages grew to house the mainly agricultural population. Rubber production was becoming increasingly important throughout Malaysia at the time, and many rubber-tree plantations were set up in this area. Later, the country-wide shift to oil palm in the 1970s and 1980s saw the establishment of oil palm plantations in the territory, some of which replaced rubber.

Kuala Krai was originally part of Ulu Kelantan until it was split following a re-delineation in 1974. Kuala Krai formally gained its own district and municipal administration in 1977.

Infrastructure developed to support the population, and by the end of the 20th century Kuala Krai town had become a busy, thriving town as well as the administrative centre for the territory.

=== Demographics ===
Historical population
Year	Pop.	±%
1991	90,830	—
2000	91,771	+1.0%
2010	104,234	+13.6%
2020	105,007	+0.7%

Kuala Krai District has an area of 2329 km² and comprises three subdistricts (daerah):

- Batu Mengkebang (Kuala Krai town) (726.9 km²) with 122 villages
- Dabong (844.5 km²) with 27 villages
- Olak Jeram (Manek Urai)(757.6 km²) with 67 villages

Some of the better known towns and villages in the territory include Dabong, Kemubu, Manek Urai, Kampung Pahi, Kampung Peria and Kampung Laloh.

=== Secondary schools ===
The secondary schools in the territory are:

- Maahad Rahmaniah Padang Sembilan (SMU (A)Rahmaniah), 18000 Kuala Krai
- Sekolah Menengah Kebangsaan Dabong (SMK Dabong), 18200 Dabong
- Sekolah Menengah Kebangsaan Keroh (SMK Keroh), 18000 Kuala Krai
- Sekolah Menengah Kebangsaan Laloh (SMK Laloh), 18000 Kuala Krai
- Sekolah Menengah Kebangsaan Manek Urai (SMK Manek Urai), 18050 Kuala Krai
- Sekolah Menengah Kebangsaan Mengkebang (SMK Mengkebang), 18000 Kuala Krai
- Sekolah Menengah Kebangsaan Pahi (SMK Pahi), 18000 Kuala Krai
- Sekolah Menengah Kebangsaan Sultan Yahya Petra (1) (SMK Sultan Yahya Petra (1)), 18000 Kuala Krai
- Sekolah Menengah Teknik Kuala Krai (SM Teknik Kuala Krai), 18000 Kuala Krai
- Sekolah Menengah Kebangsaan Kuala Krai (SMK Kuala Krai), Sungai Durian, 18000 Kuala Krai
- Sekolah Menengah Kebangsaan Sultan Yahya Petra (2) (SMK Sultan Yahya Petra (2)), 18000 Kuala Krai
- Maktab Rendah Sains Mara Kuala Krai*Fews Sekolah Menengah Ugama
- Sekolah Menengah Kebangsaan Bandar Kuala krai(SMKBKK)

=== Population ===
Map of Kuala Krai District

The population of Kuala Krai territory was 117,800 in 2009.

Ranking Population Jajahan Kuala Krai.

Rank	Daerah/Mukim	Population 2000	PBT Council
1	Batu Mengkebang	55,975	Kuala Krai District Council
2	Olak Jeram	24,665	Dabong District Council
3	Dabong	11,131	Dabong District Council

==== Population ethnicity ====
The population and ethnicity of the territory is as follows:

Population of the territory – breakdown by race
Race	1990	%	1995	%	2000	%	2004	%
Malay	92,916	91.4	110,246	90.9	130,810	90.9	149,018	90.8
Chinese	5,685	5.6	7,282	6.0	8,657	6.0	9,862	6.0
Indian	2,650	2.6	3,364	2.7	3,990	2.8	4,545	2.7
Other	354	0.4	121,339	0.4	463	0.3	527	0.3

== Attractions ==
- Taman Tasik Krai
- Taman Chintawangsa
- Taman Masjid Bandar
- Zoo Mini Kuala Krai
- Muzium Kuala Krai
- Tangga Bradley
- Jambatan Sultan Ismail
- Tembikar Kampung Mambong
- Kampung Lemang Manek Urai
- Gunung Stong
- Gua Ikan
- Air Terjun Jelawang
- Lata Berangin
- Lata Chenulang
- Lata Rek
- Lata Y
- Istana Sangkut

== Famous people from Kuala Krai ==
- Loh Sea Keong, Malaysian professional cyclist
- Datuk Rafiah Salim, is the first female Vice-Chancellor in Malaysia, posted to Universiti Malaya.
- Tengku Budriah binti Al-Marhum Tengku Ismail, the Raja Perempuan of Perlis, was born in Kuala Krai on 28 March 1925. Her husband, Almarhum Tuanku Syed Putra ibni Almarhum Syed Hassan Jamalullail was elected as the third King of Malaysia (known as Yang di-Pertuan Agong) from 1960 to 1965.

== Federal Parliament and State Assembly Seats ==
List of LMS district representatives in the Federal Parliament (Dewan Rakyat)

Parliament	Seat Name	Member of Parliament	Party
P31	Kuala Krai	Abdul Latiff Abdul Rahman	PN (PAS)

List of LMS district representatives in the State Legislative Assembly of Kelantan

Parliament	State	Seat Name	State Assemblyman	Party
P31	N39	Mengkebang	Muhammad Mat Sulaiman	PN (PAS)
P31	N40	Guchil	Hilmi Abdullah	PN (PAS)
P31	N41	Manek Urai	Mohd Fauzi Abdullah	PN (PAS)
P31	N42	Dabong	Ku Mohd Zaki Ku Hussin	PN (PAS)

== See also ==
- Kuala Krai Bridge
- Kuala Krai railway station
