= Machang District =

Machang District Machey (Kelantan–Pattani Malay)
- District of Kelantan
- Jajahan Machang
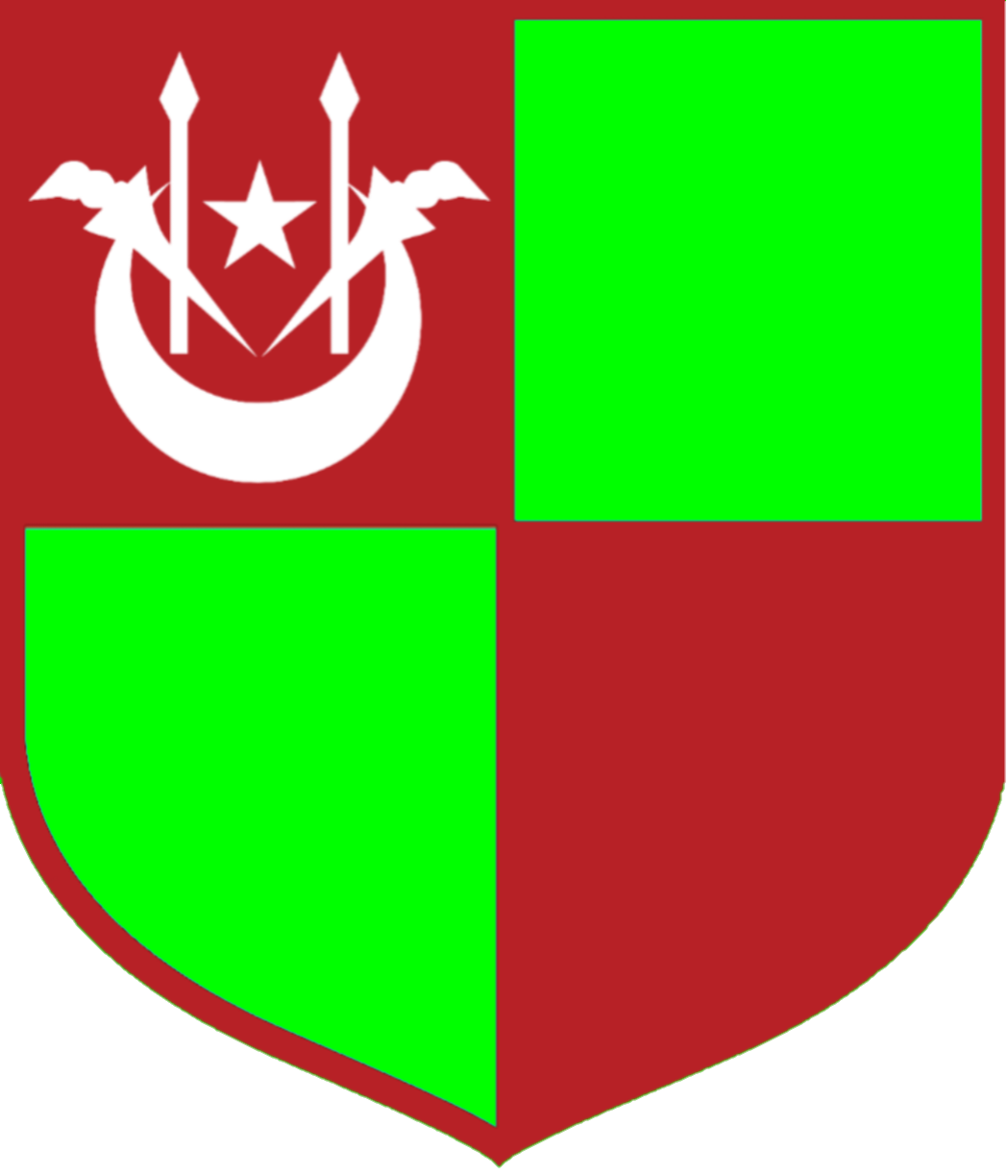
- Flag Coat of arms
- Interactive map of Machang District
- Location of Machang District in Malaysia
- Coordinates: 5°45′N 102°15′E
- Country: Malaysia
- State: Kelantan
- As a subdistrict: 1949
- As a district: 1952
- Seat: Machang Parliament in Machang (town)
- Local area government(s): Machang District Council

Government
  - District officer: Nik Mohd Hasanuddin Bin Nik Hussain
  - Administrative office: Pejabat Tanah dan Jajahan Machang

Area
  - Total: 526 km^{2} (203 sq mi)

Population (2021)
  - Total: 112,900
  - Density: 215/km^{2} (560/sq mi)
- Time zone: UTC+8 (MST)
  - Summer (DST): UTC+8 (Not observed)
- Postal codes in Malaysia/Postcode: 18500
- Telephone numbers in Malaysia/Calling code: +6-09
- Vehicle registration plates: D

Machang District (Kelantanese: Jajahey Machey, Jawi script: ماچڠ) is one of the ten districts in the state of Kelantan, Malaysia.

It is situated at the centre of the state, bordering with Kelantanese territories of Kota Bharu District to the north, Pasir Puteh District to the east, Terengganu State to the southeast, Tanah Merah District to the west and Kuala Krai District to the south.

Its major town and administrative centre is Machang town.

Machang is famous with Kelantan cuisine like Akok Cikgu,

== History ==
Previously part of Ulu Kelantan, around 1949, Machang was delineated as an autonomous sub-district of Kelantan. Owing to its rapid pace of development and active economic sector, Machang was upgraded as a full District on January 1, 1952. The territory is still largely agrarian, home to a lot of paddy fields, palm and rubber plantations.

== Attractions ==
Among the attractions that get frequented a lot in Machang District are the hot springs that are situated in Kampung Rengas Tok Bok, Hutan Lipur Bukit Bakar, Air Terjun Jeram Linang and Hutan Lipur Cabang Tongkat.

== Educational Institution ==
The district is the host for the Universiti Teknologi Mara (Machang Branch), 9 national secondary schools, 1 fully residential school, 3 State-Funded Islamic religious school and 20 national primary schools which include a Chinese vernacular national type primary school.

=== University ===
1. Universiti Teknologi Mara Machang (UiTM)

=== Secondary Education ===
==== National Schools ====
1. Sekolah Menengah Kebangsaan Machang
2. Sekolah Menengah Kebangsaan Hamzah 1
3. Sekolah Menengah Kebangsaan Hamzah 2
4. Sekolah Menengah Kebangsaan Bandar Machang
5. Sekolah Menengah Kebangsaan Abdul Samad
6. Sekolah Menengah Kebangsan Agama Wataniah Machang
7. Sekolah Menengah Kebangsaan Sri Intan
8. Sekolah Menengah Kebangsaan Temangan
9. Sekolah Menengah Kebangsaan Pangkal Meleret

==== Fully Residential School ====
1. Sekolah Menengah Sains Machang

==== State Funded Islamic Religious School ====
1. Maahad Tahfiz Al Quran Wal Qiraat
2. Maahad Syamsul Maarif Lelaki
3. Maahad Syamsul Maarif Perempuan

=== Primary Education ===
==== National Schools ====
1. Sekolah Kebangsaan Ayer Merah
2. Sekolah Kebangsaan Bandar
3. Sekolah Kebangsaan Bukit Tiu
4. Sekolah Kebangsaan Belukar
5. Sekolah Kebangsaan Dewan Besar
6. Sekolah Kebangsaan Hamzah (1)
7. Sekolah Kebangsaan Hamzah (2)
8. Sekolah Kebangsaan Kampung Pek
9. Sekolah Kebangsaan Labok
10. Sekolah Kebangsaan Machang (1)
11. Sekolah Kebangsaan Machang (2)
12. Sekolah Kebangsaan Mata Ayer
13. Sekolah Kebangsaan Pulai Chondong
14. Sekolah Kebangsaan Pak Roman
15. Sekolah Kebangsaan Pangkal Gong
16. Sekolah Kebangsaan Pangkal Mak Wan
17. Sekolah Kebangsaan Pangkal Meleret
18. Sekolah Kebangsaan Pangkal Nering
19. Sekolah Kebangsaan Pangkal Jenereh
20. Sekolah Kebangsaan Pulai Chondong
21. Sekolah Kebangsaan Temangan
22. Sekolah Kebangsaan Tok Bok

==== National School (Chinese Vernacular) ====
1. Sekolah Jenis Kebangsaan (C) Pei Hwa

== Demographics ==
Historical population
Year	Pop.	±%
1991	71,584	—
2000	77,762	+8.6%
2010	89,118	+14.6%
2020	110,008	+23.4%

Map of Machang District

As of 2010, Machang has a population of 92,149 people.

Ranking Population of Jajahan Machang.

Rank	Daerah/Mukim	Population 2000
1	Ulu Sat	26,800
2	Pulai Chondong	12,661
3	Labok	12,136
4	Panyit	10,330
5	Pangkal Meleret	10,225
6	Temangan	5,608

== Federal parliament and state assembly seats ==
List of LMS district representatives in the federal parliament (Dewan Rakyat)

Parliament	Seat Name	Member of Parliament	Party
P29	Machang	Wan Ahmad Fayhsal Wan Ahmad Kamal	Perikatan Nasional (PPBM)

List of LMS district representatives in the state legislative assembly:

Parliament	State	Seat Name	State Assemblyman	Party
P29	N33	Pulai Chondong	Azhar Salleh	Perikatan Nasional (PAS)
P29	N34	Temangan	Mohamed Fadzli Hassan	Perikatan Nasional (PAS)
P29	N35	Kemuning	Mohd Roseli Ismail	Perikatan Nasional (PAS)

== Transportation ==
Highways 4 and 8 intersect in Machang.

KTM Intercity does not serve Machang town; however there is a railway halt in Temangan town about 10 km from Machang town centre. The halt is the only railway station operating in the Machang constituency.
