= Kuala Krai (town) =

Kuala Krai Kkeghe (Kelantan-Pattani Malay) Kuala Lebir
- Town and district capital
- Seal

- Location of Kuala Krai (town) in Kelantan Kuala Krai (Peninsular Malaysia)
- Coordinates: 5°32′N 102°12′E
- Country: Malaysia
- State: Kelantan
- District: Kuala Krai District

Government
  - Type: Local government
  - Body: Kuala Krai District Council
  - President: Tengku Ab Rahman Yunus

Population (2010)
  - Total: N/A
- Time zone: UTC+8 (MST)
  - Summer (DST): UTC+8 (Not observed)
- Postcode: 18xxx
- Calling code: +6-09-9
- Vehicle registration plates: D
- Website: mdkkrai.kelantan.gov.my

Kuala Krai District Council Majlis Daerah Kuala Krai

Type
- Type: Local authority

History
- Founded: 1 January 1979

Leadership
- President: Tengku Ab Rahman Yunus
- District secretary: Muhammad Zaidi Mat Jusoh

Motto
- Berkhidmat Untuk Kemajuan (Service For Development)

Meeting place
- KM 1, Jalan Kuala Krai - Gua Musang, 18000 Kuala Krai, Kelantan.

Website
- mdkkrai.kelantan.gov.my

Kuala Krai (alternative spelling: Kuala Kerai; Kelantanese: Kkeghe) is a town located in the coterminous Kuala Krai District in southern-central Kelantan, Malaysia. During British protection it was known as Kuala Lebir. It is 67 km from state capital Kota Bharu and 273 km from national capital Kuala Lumpur. The altitude is 53 metres (177 ft) above sea level here.

== Population ==
Population of Kuala Krai town (data from populstat).
Year	1980	1991	2000	2020
Population in thousands	12.6	19.8	19.5	63.9

== History ==
The history of the town of Kuala Krai started with the building of the East Coast Railway in the 1920s. Before that, the only settlement of any significance in the area was called Batu Mengkebang. The area was remote and travel was by river: there was a weekly service from Kota Baru to Batu Mengkebang via Pasir Mas and Tanah Merah, run by Duff Development River Steamers under contract to the Kelantan Government.

The opening of the railway line made a significant difference to the remote interior of the state of Kelantan. River traffic downstream from Kuala Krai was soon completely replaced by rail travel, and the railway became very popular with what was still quite a large planting fraternity in the interior of the state. The town grew as a centre of trade and supplies for the surrounding area.

More recently, road traffic past the town has significantly increased with the proximity of Federal Route 8 which opens a direct road link between Kota Bharu and the Malaysian capital, Kuala Lumpur. The suburb of Guchil has developed along this road to take advantage of the increased traffic.

Some important events in the history of the town:

- 1917 Kuala Krai hospital was opened
- 1926 (December) The great flood, the worst flood in the history of the town, which affected both Kelantan and the neighbouring states of Terengganu and Perak
- 1930 (19 June) Visit of Sir Cecil Clementi, Governor of the Straits Settlements and High Commissioner for Malaya 1930-1934, after which he travelled on the newly constructed railway to Pahang
- 1941 The Japanese invasion force landed at Kota Bharu on 8 December and allied troops retreated; 2nd Lieutenant Butters and his section of Mahrattas were left behind in Kuala Kerai with a battalion of the Royal Malay Regiment; before leaving the town they attempted to impede Japanese progress using explosives to prevent the railway line being used by the advancing Japanese
- 1945 Immediately after the war ended, Kuala Krai was controlled by the communists for about six months before the arrival of allied forces
- 1946 Serious flooding affected the town
- 1961 Opening of the Mini Zoo
- 1967 (26 Nov) Severe flooding: the water level of the Kelantan River rose to 86 ft (26 m), which is 36 ft (11 m) above the normal level Large areas of the town were flooded up to first floor level.
- 1967 (Dec) forced landing of an M.S.A. plane at Kuala Kerai which nearly had fatal consequences to the passengers
- 2013 Record Setting Flood affected the town.

== Infrastructure ==
=== Transport ===
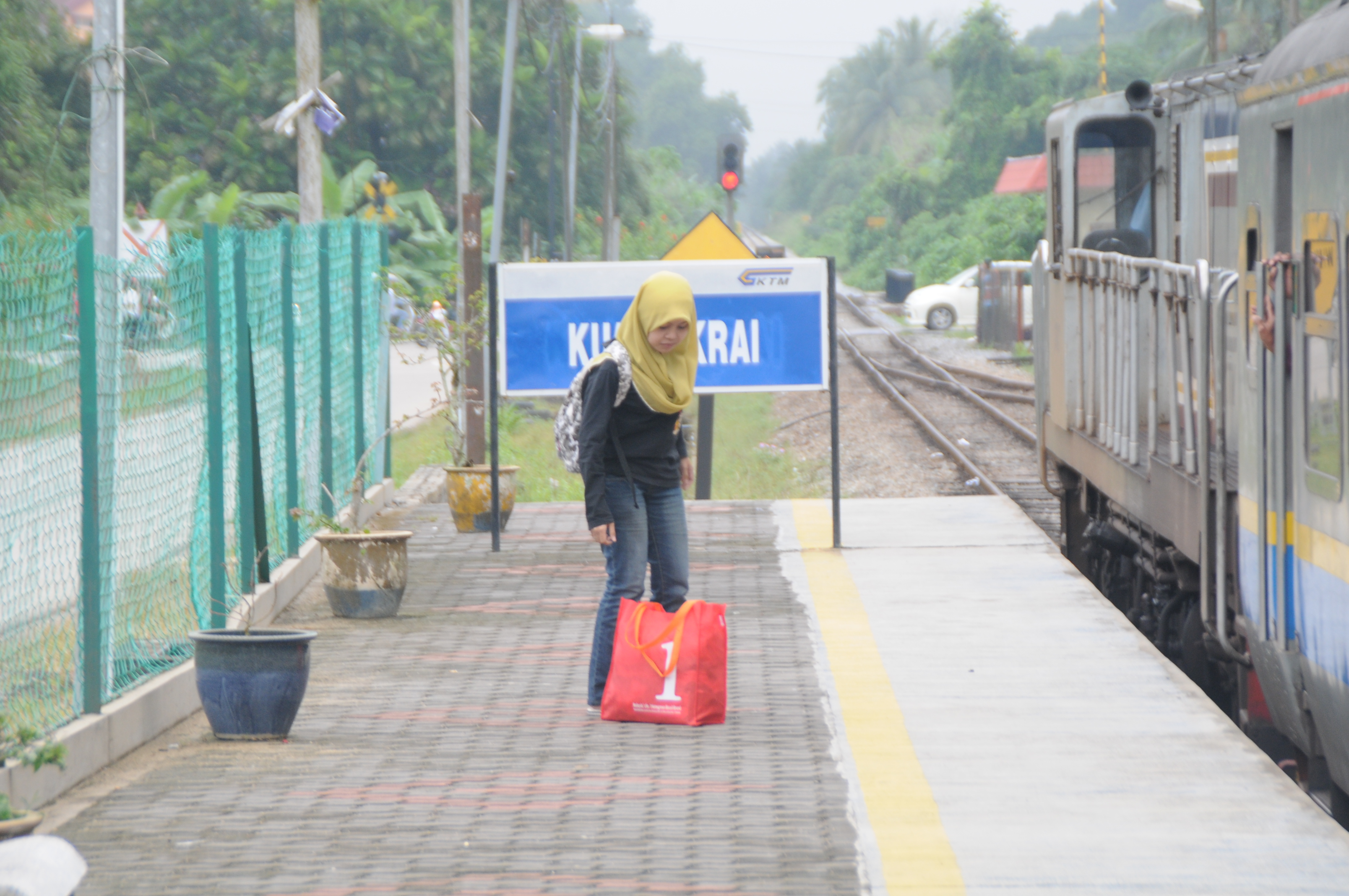
Kuala Krai train station

Kuala Krai has excellent transport links. The railway station operated by Keretapi Tanah Melayu (KTM) is on the East Coast Line which runs from Tumpat and Wakaf Bharu (close to Kota Bharu) right through the interior parts of Kelantan and Pahang to Gemas on the west of the peninsula, where it joins the West Coast Line from Singapore to Kuala Lumpur. The town has good road links, with Federal Route 8 passing close to the town. It is also located on the western bank of the Kelantan River, along which there are regular boat services up-river from the town.

=== General Hospital ===
Hospital Kuala Krai (HKK) opened in 1917, built on a small hill close to the town. Also known as Hospikrai, it serves a population of 200,000 in the southern part of Kelantan, and has 120 beds and 218 staff. The hospital has resident specialists in Obstetrics & Gynecology, Pediatrics, Surgery, Anesthesiology, Pathology and Medical; there are visiting specialists from Kota Bharu for work in Psychiatric, Dermatology, Ophthalmology, Orthopedic and ENT.

=== Museum and Mini Zoo ===
Kuala Krai Mini Zoo is managed by the District Council and open to the public. It is home to a variety of animals, including a male elephant called "Salleh", monkeys, bears, deer and various birds. The site extends to about 10 acres (40,000 m^{2}), and also includes a Mini Museum displaying photographs and documents relating to the history of Kuala Krai, as well as a number of preserved animals. The mini zoo was opened in 1961 and is the only zoo to specialise exclusively in animals from the Malaysian jungle.

=== Public Library ===
There is a small public library in the town which, as well as giving access to its collection of books, affords public access to the internet for a small charge.

=== Kuala Krai Steps (formerly the Bradley Steps) ===
Eighty-one concrete steps leading down from the town to the river bank and boat jetty were constructed sometime between 1927 and 1929, and were named the Bradley Steps after a Mr. Gerald Bradley who was the energetic District Officer of the interior of Kelantan at the time. They have recently been renamed the Kuala Krai Steps.

Just upstream from the town is the confluence of the Lebir and Galas rivers to become the Kelantan river, and it became clear that an elevated river level at the Bradley Steps was a good predictor of imminent flooding in the cultivated and populated river basin further downstream (i.e. Kota Bharu). Consequently, stick gauges were placed by the steps so that the river level could be read and monitored by the local police, who transmitted the rainfall and water level information via VHF sets to the Flood Warning and Relief Committee in Kota Bharu.

The Kelantan Department of Drainage and Irrigation has since replaced the stick gauges with metric plates. This facilitates the prediction of flood levels and lead-times in villages all the way from Kuala Krai to the river estuary. The steps, and the floodwater level, can be seen on the Kuala Krai Flood Webcam.

=== Education ===
There are a number of schools and colleges in the town, including:

- SMU (Arab) Rahmaniah, Padang Sembilan Kuala Krai
- SMK Sultan Yahya Petra 1
- SMK Sultan Yahya Petra 2
- SK Banggol Guchil
- SMK Kuala Krai
- MRSM Kuala Krai
- SM Teknik Kuala Krai
- SMK Bandar Kuala Krai
- SK Bandar Kuala Krai
- RISDA College
- SMK Pahi
- SM Laloh
- Open University Malaysia (OUM)
- SJK(C) Yuk Chai

=== Shopping ===
- Econjaya
- Pantai Timor Shopping Centre
- Jaya Gading
- Pasaraya PKT

=== Other ===
- Batu Jong Training Camp, a national service training camp, opened in January 2005
- Lake Gardens (Taman Tasik), a pleasant public space in the town
- Lata Rek, Known to be a hydroelectric dam, is also a popular spot with a nice waterfall and recreational area and homestay
