= Kota Bharu District =

Kota Bharu District Koto Baghu (Kelantan–Pattani Malay)
- District of Kelantan
- Jajahan Kota Bharu
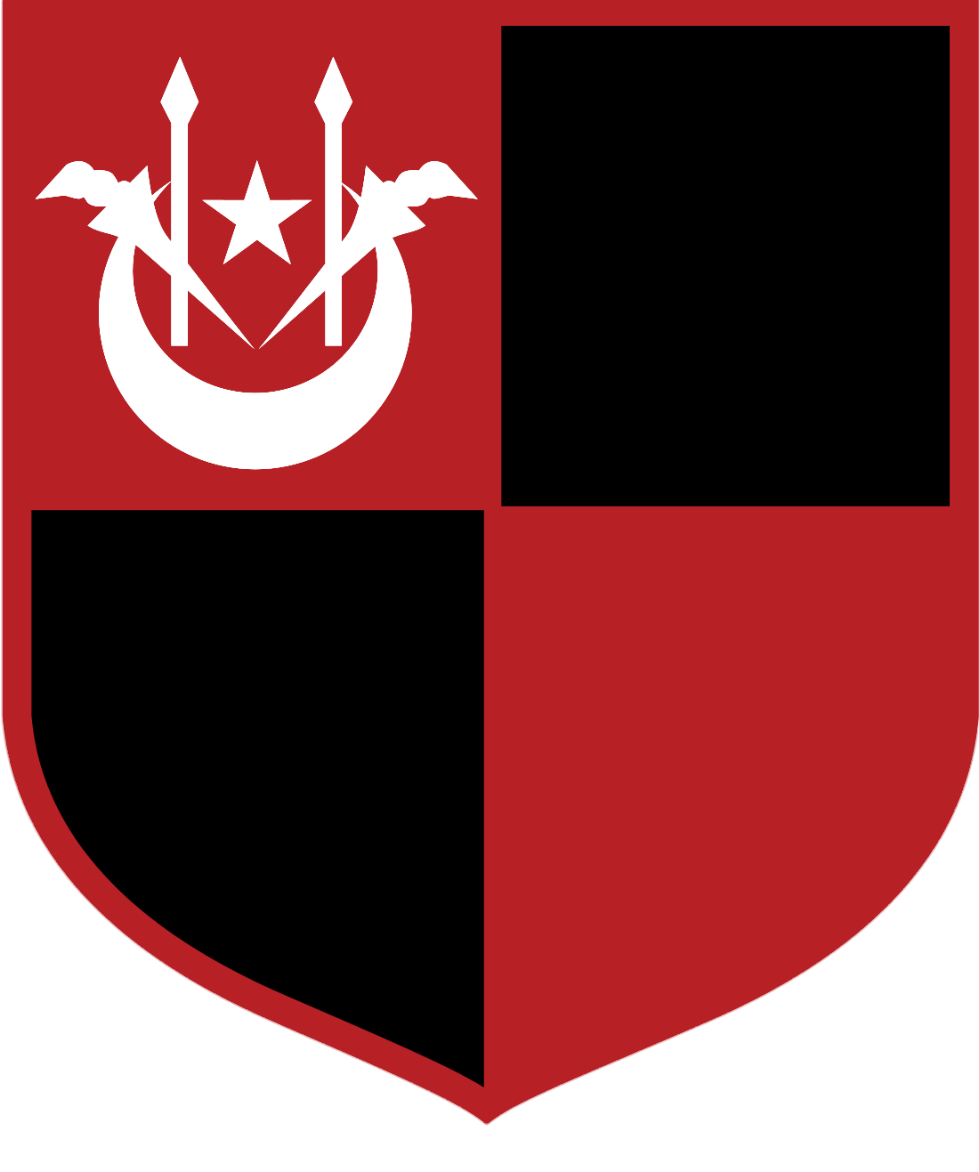
- Flag Coat of arms

- Location of Kota Bharu District in Kelantan
- Interactive map of Kota Bharu District
- Location of Kota Bharu District in Malaysia
- Coordinates: 6°5′N 102°16′E
- Country: Malaysia
- State: Kelantan
- Seat: Kota Bharu
- Local area government(s): Islamic City of Kota Bharu Municipal Council (Kota Bharu North); Islamic Municipality of Ketereh District Council (Kota Bharu South)

Government
  - District officer: Haji Mohamad Anis Bin Hussein
  - Administrative office: Kota Bharu Land and District Office

Area
  - Total: 403 km^{2} (156 sq mi)

Population (2022)
  - Total: 568,900
  - Density: 1,410/km^{2} (3,660/sq mi)
- Time zone: UTC+8 (MST)
  - Summer (DST): UTC+8 (Not observed)
- Postcode: 15xxx
- Calling code: +6-09
- Vehicle registration plates: D

The Kota Bharu District (Kelantanese: Jajahey Koto Baghu) is a district in northern Kelantan, Malaysia. As of 2023, the district's population is estimated to be 575,400. It contains the state capital, Kota Bharu, as well as Pengkalan Chepa and Ketereh.

Kota Bharu district is surrounded by six other districts, namely Bachok District, Pasir Puteh District, Machang District, Pasir Mas District and Tumpat District clockwise.

Map of Kota Bharu District and its neighbourhoods

== Municipal areas ==
Kota Bharu region contains two municipal areas within its borders:

- Islamic City of Kota Bharu Municipal Council (Majlis Perbandaran Kota Bharu Bandaraya Islam, MPKB-BRI), which manages downtown Kota Bharu, Pengkalan Chepa and Kubang Kerian; and
- Islamic Municipality of Ketereh District Council (Majlis Daerah Ketereh Perbandaran Islam, MDKetereh), which administers the southern part of Kota Bharu District, including the Salor salient, Ketereh and Kok Lanas.

== Population ==
Historical population
| Year | Pop. | ±% |
|---|---|---|
| 1991 | 366,770 | — |
| 2000 | 398,835 | +8.7% |
| 2010 | 468,438 | +17.5% |
| 2020 | 555,757 | +18.6% |

In 2010, Kota Bharu has a population of 491,237 people. By 2020, its population has risen to 608,600.

Ranking Population of Kota Bharu District (Jajahan), 2010.

| Rank | Sub-districts (Daerah) | Population 2010 | Local authority |
|---|---|---|---|
| 1 | Panji | 73,315 | Kota Bharu Municipal Council |
| 2 | Kubang Kerian | 57,259 | Kota Bharu Municipal Council |
| 3 | Ketereh | 41,835 | Ketereh District Council |
| 4 | Bandar Kota Bharu (downtown) | 44,757 | Kota Bharu Municipal Council |
| 5 | Kemumin | 41,392 | Kota Bharu Municipal Council |
| 6 | Badang (Mouth of the Kelantan River) | 35,957 | Kota Bharu Municipal Council |
| 7 | Kota | 24,364 | Kota Bharu Municipal Council |
| 8 | Sering | 24,309 | Kota Bharu Municipal Council |
| 9 | Peringat | 24,137 | Ketereh District Council |
| 10 | Banggu | 23,049 | Kota Bharu Municipal Council |
| 11 | Kadok | 19,554 | Ketereh District Council |
| 12 | Limbat | 18,796 | Kota Bharu Municipal Council |
| 13 | Pendek | 17,254 | Ketereh District Council |
| 14 | Salor | 11,255 | Ketereh District Council |
| 15 | Dewan Beta | 11,205 | Ketereh District Council |

== Politics ==
Kota Bharu is represented in the Parliament of Malaysia. For electoral purposes, the district is divided into four constituencies in the Kota Bharu electoral region. Each constituency elects one Member of Parliament (MP) by the first-past-the-post system of election.

=== Federal Parliament and State Assembly Seats ===
List of Kota Bharu district representatives in the Federal Parliament (Dewan Rakyat)

| Parliament | Seat Name | Member of Parliament | Party |
|---|---|---|---|
| P20 | Pengkalan Chepa | Ahmad Marzuk Shaary | Perikatan Nasional (PAS) |
| P21 | Kota Bharu | Takiyuddin Hassan | Perikatan Nasional (PAS) |
| P24 | Kubang Kerian | Tuan Ibrahim Tuan Man | Perikatan Nasional (PAS) |
| P26 | Ketereh | Khlir Mohd Nor | Perikatan Nasional (BERSATU) |

List of Kota Bharu district representatives in the State Legislative Assembly (Dewan Undangan Negeri)

| Parliament | State | Constituency | State Assemblyman | Party |
|---|---|---|---|---|
| P20 | N5 | Kijang | Izani Husin | Perikatan Nasional (PAS) |
| P20 | N6 | Chempaka | Nik Asma' Bahrum Nik Abdullah | Perikatan Nasional (PAS) |
| P20 | N7 | Panchor | Nik Mohd Amar Nik Abdullah | Perikatan Nasional (PAS) |
| P21 | N8 | Tanjong Mas | Rohani Ibrahim | Perikatan Nasional (PAS) |
| P21 | N9 | Kota Lama | Hafidzah Mustakim | Pakatan Harapan (AMANAH) |
| P21 | N10 | Bunut Payong | Shaari Mat Yaman | Perikatan Nasional (PAS) |
| P24 | N17 | Salor | Saizol Ismail | Perikatan Nasional (PAS) |
| P24 | N18 | Pasir Tumboh | Abd Rahman Yunus | Perikatan Nasional (PAS) |
| P24 | N19 | Demit | Mohd Asri Mat Daud | Perikatan Nasional (PAS) |
| P26 | N23 | Melor | Wan Rohimi Wan Daud | Perikatan Nasional (PAS) |
| P26 | N24 | Kadok | Azami Mohd Nor | Perikatan Nasional (PAS) |
| P26 | N25 | Kok Lanas | Mohamed Farid Mohamed Zawawi | Perikatan Nasional (BERSATU) |
