= Ab Aziz Ab Kadir =

Malaysian politician

- عبدالعزيز عبدالقدير

Member of the Malaysian Parliament for Ketereh
- In office 8 March 2008 – 5 May 2013
- Preceded by: Md Alwi Che Ahmad (BN–UMNO)
- Succeeded by: Annuar Musa (BN–UMNO)
- Majority: 400 (2008)

Personal details
- Born: 11 February 1963 (age 63) Kelantan, Federation of Malaya (now Malaysia)
- Party: People's Justice Party (PKR) (until 2020); Malaysian United Indigenous Party (BERSATU) (since 2020)
- Other political affiliations: Pakatan Rakyat (2008–2015); Pakatan Harapan (2015–2020); Perikatan Nasional (since 2020)
- Occupation: Politician

Ab Aziz bin Ab Kadir (born 11 February 1963) is a Malaysian politician and a former Member of the Parliament of Malaysia for the Ketereh constituency in Kelantan. He was a member of the People's Justice Party (PKR) in the Pakatan Rakyat opposition coalition.

Ab Aziz was elected to the Ketereh seat in the 2008 election, defeating United Malay National Organisation (UMNO)'s Annuar Musa by 400 votes. Annuar re-took the seat in the 2013 election by 972 votes. PKR unsuccessfully challenged the 2013 result in the Malaysian courts.

He joined BERSATU in 2020. In October 2021, he was appointed as Chairman of the National Kenaf and Tobacco Board (NKTB).

== Election results ==
Parliament of Malaysia
Year	Constituency	Candidate	Votes	Pct	Opponent(s)	Votes	Pct	Ballot cast	Majority	Turnout
2008	P026 Ketereh	Ab Aziz Ab Kadir (PKR)	21,738	50.46%	Annuar Musa (UMNO)	21,338	49.54%	44,377	400	84.95%
2013	P026 Ketereh	Ab Aziz Ab Kadir (PKR)	25,938	49.08%	Annuar Musa (UMNO)	26,912	50.92%	53,906	974	86.64%

Kelantan State Legislative Assembly
Year	Constituency	Candidate	Votes	Pct	Opponent(s)	Votes	Pct	Ballot cast	Majority	Turnout
2018	N23 Melor	Ab Aziz Ab Kadir (PKR)	2,122	12.40%	Md Yusnan Yusof (PAS)	7,820	45.69%	17,586	647	82.80%
2018	N23 Melor	Ab Aziz Ab Kadir (PKR)	2,122	12.40%	Azmi Ishak (UMNO)	7,173	41.91%	17,586	647	82.80%
