= National Vision Party (Malaysia) =

Political party of Malaysia

National Vision Party Parti Wawasan Negara
- President: Hamzah Zainudin
- Chairman: Rais Yatim
- Secretary-General: Saifuddin Abdullah
- Deputy President: Tan Lek Khang
- Vice Presidents: Abdul Rahim Thamby Chik; Wan Saiful Wan Jan; Leong Kim Soon; Mohd Omar Mustapha Ong; Huan Cheng Guan
- Treasurer: Arifin Tobias
- Founder: Huan Cheng Guan (as PCM, 2009); Hamzah Zainudin (as Wawasan Negara, 2026)
- Founded: August 9, 2009 (as PCM); June 13, 2026 (as Wawasan Negara)
- Legalised: July 6, 2026 (as Wawasan Negara)
- Split from: GERAKAN (Huan Cheng Guan, 2009); BERSATU (Hamzah Zainudin, 2026)
- Preceded by: Reset Malaysia
- Youth wing: Pemuda Wawasan Negara
- Women's wing: Wanita Wawasan Negara
- Ideology: Nationalism; National conservativism Multiracialism; Social conservativism
- Political position: Right-wing
- National affiliation: Perikatan Nasional (since 2026) (Note: The party was allied with Gagasan Sejahtera (2017–2020) and was a Friend of BN (2009–2017, 2020–2026))
- Colours: Red; Blue; White
- Slogan: Membina Konsensus Nasional Baharu (Forming A New National Consensus)
- Dewan Negara: 1 / 70
- Dewan Rakyat: 6 / 222
- Dewan Undangan Negeri: 8 / 612

Election symbol

The National Vision Party (Malay: Parti Wawasan Negara, abbreviated WAWASAN) is a right-wing Malaysian nationalist party. The party was founded as the Love Malaysia Party (Malay: Parti Cinta Malaysia; abbrev: PCM), before being taken over by a group of former Malaysian United Indigenous Party (BERSATU) MPs, including Leader of the Opposition and former BERSATU deputy president Hamzah Zainudin.

== History ==
=== Parti Cinta Malaysia (PCM) ===
Its members include former GERAKAN Vice President and Member of Parliament Huan Cheng Guan, and former Sarawak State Assembly independent member for Ngemah; Gabriel Adit Demong.

The party contested the 2011 Sarawak state election. However, party lost its only seat, Ngemah, by 995 votes to Barisan Nasional.

During the 2013 Malaysian general election, the party failed to win any seats. As a result, the party closed all its service centres in the state of Penang.

In the 2018 Malaysian general electio, PCM became a strategic partner of Gagasan Sejahtera, but again lost in all the seats it contested. Following the election and the swearing in of Chow Kon Yeow as Chief Minister of Penang, party deputy president Huan Cheng Guan retired from active politics, having promised to do so once Lim Guan Eng was no longer chief minister in the state.

=== Parti Wawasan Negara (WAWASAN) ===
A leadership dispute within the Malaysian United Indigenous Party (BERSATU) led to a gradual expulsion of members who aligned themselves with Hamzah Zainudin against Muhyiddin Yassin, culminating in the sacking of Hamzah on 12 February 2026.

The next day, Hamzah met with Malaysian Islamic Party (PAS) president Abdul Hadi Awang, and spoke at a "Political Reset and Roadmap Briefing", said to have been attended by a majority of BERSATU's division chiefs as well as 19 of the party's active and expelled MPs. Hamzah later adopted the name "Reset" to refer to his political programme and movement.

On 13 June 2026, Hamzah announced at a Reset convention that a new party called Parti Wawasan Negara would be established, the name having been suggested by Abdul Hadi Awang. Hamzah later clarified that he would be taking over an existing party instead of founding a new one. The party was also given authorisation to contest in the coming state elections in Johor and Negeri Sembilan under Perikatan Nasional.

== Organisational structure ==
- Chairman:
  - Rais Yatim
- President:
  - Hamzah Zainudin
- Deputy President:
  - Tan Lek Khang
- Vice Presidents:
  - Abdul Rahim Thamby Chik
  - Wan Saiful Wan Jan
  - Leong Kim Soon
  - Mohd Omar Mustapha Ong
  - Huan Cheng Guan
- Women Chief:
  - Dayang Saniah Awang Hamid
- Youth Chief:
  - Muhammad Faiz Rahmad
- Secretary-General:
  - Saifuddin Abdullah
- Treasurer-General:
  - Arifin Tobias
- Information Chief:
  - Wan Ahmad Fayhsal Wan Ahmad Kamal
- Executive Secretary:
  - Mohd Badrul Ezan Mohd Yusof
- Supreme Leadership Council Members:
  - Dzowahir Ab Ghani
  - Mohamed Farid Mohamed Zawawi
  - Fathul Huzir Ayob
  - Azahari Hasan
  - Ibrahim Shah Abu Shah
  - Suhaimi Mohd Ghazali
  - Zulkifli Bujang
  - Simon Suresh V. Varunamegam
  - Khaliq Mehtab Mohd Ishaq
  - Asmawi Harun
  - Abdul Aziz Ismail
  - Dayang Saniah Awang Hamid
  - Richard Ng
  - Mohd Khoushaini Mohd Naim
  - Tan Tee Beng
  - Tun Fiqa Mohammad
  - Phang Horng Woie
  - Syed Hassan Syed Ali
  - Yunus Nordin
  - Muhammad Fadhli bin Ismail
  - Wong Chan Giap
  - Hussien Ridzuan Ibrahim Basri
  - Bibi Sunita Sakandar Khan
  - Huan Xin Yun
  - Mohd Hamdan Mohd Sharif
  - Hazani Ghazali
  - Thirumoorthy Nadesan
  - Noor Hashimah Noordin
- State Coordinator:
  - Federal Territories: Afnan Shahruddin
  - Johor: Zulkifli Bujang
  - Kedah: Abdul Razak Khamis
  - Kelantan: Mohamed Farid Mohamed Zawawi
  - Malacca: Rahim Thamby Chik
  - Negeri Sembilan: Badrul Hisham Shaharin
  - Pahang: Asmawi Harun
  - Perak: Zainol Fadzi Paharudin
  - Perlis: Azahar Hassan
  - Penang: Khaliq Mehtab Mohd Ishaq
  - Sarawak: Duke Janteng
  - Sabah: Ariffin Tobias
  - Selangor: Suhaimi Ghazali
  - Terengganu: Abdul Aziz Ismail

== Elected representatives ==
WAWASAN controlled 19 Members of Parliament, both its own members as well as suspended members of BERSATU. The following list excludes WAWASAN-affiliated MPs and assemblymen who are still formally BERSATU members.

=== Senators ===
- Azahar Hassan (Perlis)

=== Dewan Rakyat (House of Representatives) ===
==== Members of Parliament of the 15th Malaysian Parliament ====
State	No.	Parliament constituency	Member
Kelantan	P029	Machang	Wan Ahmad Fayhsal
Penang	P042	Tasek Gelugor	Wan Saiful Wan Jan
Perak	P054	Gerik	Fathul Huzir Ayob
Perak	P056	Larut	Hamzah Zainudin
Perak	P061	Padang Rengas	Azahari Hasan
Pahang	P082	Indera Mahkota	Saifuddin Abdullah
Total	Kelantan (1), Penang (1), Perak (3), Pahang (1)		

=== Dewan Undangan Negeri (State Legislative Assembly) ===
==== Malaysian State Assembly Representatives ====
Negeri Sembilan State Legislative Assembly
3 / 36
Kedah State Legislative Assembly
2 / 36
Malacca State Legislative Assembly
1 / 28
Kelantan State Legislative Assembly
1 / 45
Perak State Legislative Assembly
1 / 59
Perlis State Legislative Assembly
0 / 15
Terengganu State Legislative Assembly
0 / 33
Penang State Legislative Assembly
0 / 40
Pahang State Legislative Assembly
0 / 47
Selangor State Legislative Assembly
0 / 56
Johor State Legislative Assembly
0 / 56
Sabah State Legislative Assembly
0 / 79
Sarawak State Legislative Assembly
0 / 82

State	No.	Parliamentary Constituency	No.	State Assembly Constituency	Member
Kedah	P009	Alor Setar	N12	Suka Menanti	Dzowahir Ab Ghani
Kedah	P011	Pendang	N19	Sungai Tiang	Abdul Razak Khamis
Kelantan	P026	Ketereh	N25	Kok Lanas	Mohamed Farid Mohamed Zawawi
Perak	P073	Pasir Salak	N49	Sungai Manik	Zainol Fadzi Paharudin
Malacca	P139	Jasin	N24	Bemban	Mohd Yadzil Yaakub
Negeri Sembilan	P126	Jelebu	N04	Klawang	Danni Rais
Negeri Sembilan	P128	Seremban	N13	Sikamat	Razali Abu Samah
Negeri Sembilan	P133	Tampin	N34	Gemas	Ridzuan Ahmad
Total	Negeri Sembilan (3), Kedah (2), Kelantan (1), Perak (1), Malacca (1)				

== Government offices ==
=== State government ===
- Kelantan (2026–present)
- Kedah (2026–present)
- Negeri Sembilan (2026–present)
- Malacca (2026–present)

Note: bold for coalition lead, italic as junior partner

=== Legislative leadership ===
State	Leader type	Member	State Constituency
Kedah	Deputy Speaker	Abdul Razak Khamis	Sungai Tiang
Kelantan	Deputy Speaker	Mohamed Farid Mohamed Zawawi	Kok Lanas

=== Official opposition ===
Portfolio	Office Bearer	Constituency
Leader of Opposition	Hamzah Zainudin	Larut

== General election results ==
Election	Total seats won	Seats contested	Total votes	Voting Percentage	Outcome of election	Election leader
2013 (PCM)	0 / 222	3	2,129	0.02%	0 seat; No representation in Parliament	Huan Cheng Guan
2018 (PCM)	0 / 222	1	502	0.00%	0 seat; No representation in Parliament (Gagasan Sejahtera)	Huan Cheng Guan
2022 (PCM)	0 / 222	1	5,417	0.03%	0 seat; No representation in Parliament (Friends of BN)	Huan Cheng Guan
2028	0 / 222	TBD	TBD	TBD	TBD (Perikatan Nasional)	Hamzah Zainuddin

== State election results ==
State assembly	Election	Votes	%	Seats	Won/contested	+/–	Position (Note: As part of electoral coalition.)	Status
Perlis	2022	Did not contest						No seats
Kedah	2023	Did not contest						PN (Note: Assemblyman sacked from BERSATU.) (Note: BERSATU–PN (since 2026))
Kelantan	2023	Did not contest						PN
Terengganu	2023	Did not contest						No seats
Penang	2023	Did not contest						No seats
Perak	2022	Did not contest						Opposition
Pahang	2022	Did not contest						No seats
Selangor	2023	Did not contest						No seats
Negeri Sembilan	2026	40,170	6.3	3 / 36	3 / 4	▲3	3rd (Perikatan Nasional)	BN–PN
Malacca	2026	24,515	5.0	1 / 28	1 / 2	▲1	3rd (Perikatan Nasional)	BN–PN
Johor	2026	Did not contest						No seats
Sabah	2025	Did not contest						No seats
Sarawak	2021	Did not contest						No seats

Note

State election	State Legislative Assembly													
State election	Perlis	Kedah	Kelantan	Terengganu	Penang	Perak	Pahang	Selangor	Negeri Sembilan	Malacca	Johor	Sabah	Sarawak	Total won / Total contested
2/3 majority	2 / 3	2 / 3	2 / 3	2 / 3	2 / 3	2 / 3	2 / 3	2 / 3	2 / 3	2 / 3	2 / 3	2 / 3	2 / 3	Legislative Assembly
2011 (PCM)													0 / 71	0 / 6
2013 (PCM)					0 / 40									0 / 3
2018 (PCM)					0 / 40									0 / 1
2026									3 / 36	1 / 28			0 / 82	4 / 6

== See also ==
- Politics of Malaysia
- List of political parties in Malaysia
