= Pengkalan Chepa (federal constituency) =

Federal constituency of Kelantan, Malaysia

Pengkalan Chepa (P020)
Kelantan constituency

Federal constituency
- Legislature: Dewan Rakyat
- MP: Ahmad Marzuk Shaary; PN
- Constituency created: 1974
- First contested: 1974
- Last contested: 2022

Demographics
- Population (2020): 159,674
- Electors (2023): 107,814
- Area (km²): 85
- Pop. density (per km²): 1,878.5

Pengkalan Chepa is a federal constituency in Kota Bharu District, Kelantan, Malaysia, that has been represented in the Dewan Rakyat since 1974. Pengkalan Chepa is between Kota Bharu and Pengkalan Kubur.

The federal constituency was created in the 1974 redistribution and is mandated to return a single member to the Dewan Rakyat under the first past the post voting system.

== Demographics ==
https://live.chinapress.com.my/ge15/parliament/KELANTAN

Ethnic breakdown of Pengkalan Chepa's electorate as of 2022
1. Malay (99.8%)
2. Chinese (0.20%)
3. Other ethnicities (0.00%)
4. Indian (0.00%)

As of 2020, Pengkalan Chepa has a population of 159,674 people.

Age breakdown of Pengkalan Chepa's electorate as of 2022
1. 18-20 (7.76%)
2. 21-29 (25.9%)
3. 30-39 (25.6%)
4. 40-49 (16.4%)
5. 50-59 (11.8%)
6. 60-69 (7.90%)
7. 70-79 (3.51%)
8. 80-89 (0.90%)
9. above 90 (0.22%)
Gender breakdown of Pengkalan Chepa's electorate as of 2022
1. Male (49.6%)
2. Female (50.4%)

== History ==
=== Polling districts ===
According to the federal gazette issued on 18 July 2023, the Pengkalan Chepa constituency is divided into 32 polling districts.

State constituency	Polling Districts	Code	Location
Kijang (N05)	Pulau Pisang	020/05/01	SK Che Latiff
Kijang (N05)	Pulau Kundor	020/05/02	SK Pulau Kundor
Kijang (N05)	Semut Api	020/05/03	SK Semut Api
Kijang (N05)	Kedai Buloh	020/05/04	SMK Kedai Buloh
Kijang (N05)	Kijang	020/05/05	SK Kedai Buloh 1
Kijang (N05)	Banggol	020/05/06	SK Abdul Hadi
Kijang (N05)	Tikat	020/05/07	SK Redang
Kijang (N05)	Kampung Penambang	020/05/08	SMK Penambang
Kijang (N05)	Kampung China	020/05/09	SK Penambang
Chempaka (N06)	Sabak	020/06/01	SK Sabak
Chempaka (N06)	Tebing Tinggi	020/06/02	SK Parang Puting
Chempaka (N06)	Telok Kitang	020/06/03	SK Padang Puting
Chempaka (N06)	Kampung Pulau Panjang	020/06/04	SK Kem
Chempaka (N06)	Tanjong Bahru	020/06/05	SMK Badang
Chempaka (N06)	Che Deris	020/06/06	SK Che Deris
Chempaka (N06)	Baung	020/06/07	SMK Pengkalan Chepa
Chempaka (N06)	Pengkalan Nangka	020/06/08	SMA Tengku Amalin A'ishah Putri
Chempaka (N06)	Chempaka	020/06/09	SK Seri Chempaka
Chempaka (N06)	Simpang Tiga Pengkalan Chepa	020/06/10	Kolej Vokesional Pengkalan Chepa
Chempaka (N06)	Pulau Gajah	020/06/11	SK Pulau Gajah
Panchor (N07)	Taman Kemunin	020/07/01	SK Datu' Hashim
Panchor (N07)	Tapang	020/07/02	SK Tapang
Panchor (N07)	Kemunin	020/07/03	SK Kemunin
Panchor (N07)	Panchor	020/07/04	SK Panji
Panchor (N07)	Sering	020/07/05	SK Sering
Panchor (N07)	Pasir Kasar	020/07/06	SMK Sering
Panchor (N07)	Pulau Belaga	020/07/07	SK Chicha Menyabong
Panchor (N07)	Tok Ku	020/07/08	SMK Raja Sakti
Panchor (N07)	Kampung Belukar	020/07/09	SMK Panji
Panchor (N07)	Padang Tembak	020/07/10	SMU (A) Tarbiah Mardziah
Panchor (N07)	Panji	020/07/11	SMK Panchor Perdana
Panchor (N07)	Pasir Tok Kambing	020/07/12	SK Raja Bahar

=== Representation history ===
Members of Parliament for Pengkalan Chepa
Parliament	No	Years	Member	Party	Vote Share
Constituency created, renamed from Kelantan Hilir
4th	P017	1974–1978	Nik Abdul Aziz Nik Mat (نئ عبدالعزيز نئ مت)	BN (PAS)	13,243; 73.88%
5th	P017	1978–1982	Nik Abdul Aziz Nik Mat (نئ عبدالعزيز نئ مت)	PAS	11,897; 54.53%
6th	P017	1982–1986	Nik Abdul Aziz Nik Mat (نئ عبدالعزيز نئ مت)	PAS	16,759; 59.48%
7th	P018	1986–1990	Nik Abdullah Arshad (نئ عبدالله أرشد)	PAS	17,501; 56.77%
8th	P018	1990–1995	Nik Abdullah Arshad (نئ عبدالله أرشد)	APU (PAS)	27,321; 73.45%
9th	P020	1995–1999	Mohd Amar Abdullah (محمد عمار عبدﷲ)	APU (PAS)	20,410; 68.15%
10th	P020	1999–2004	Mohd Amar Abdullah (محمد عمار عبدﷲ)	BA (PAS)	23,765; 75.24%
11th	P020	2004–2008	Abdul Halim Abdul Rahman (عبدالحليم عبدالرحمٰن)	PAS	20,621; 58.88%
12th	P020	2008–2013	Abdul Halim Abdul Rahman (عبدالحليم عبدالرحمٰن)	PR (PAS)	26,736; 63.40%
13th	P020	2013–2015	Izani Husin (عزاني حسين)	PR (PAS)	34,617; 63.97%
13th	P020	2015–2016	Izani Husin (عزاني حسين)	PAS	34,617; 63.97%
13th	P020	2016–2018	Izani Husin (عزاني حسين)	GS (PAS)	34,617; 63.97%
14th	P020	2018–2020	Ahmad Marzuk Shaary (أحمد مرزوق شاعري)	GS (PAS)	32,592; 54.88%
14th	P020	2020–2022	Ahmad Marzuk Shaary (أحمد مرزوق شاعري)	PN (PAS)	32,592; 54.88%
15th	P020	2022–present	Ahmad Marzuk Shaary (أحمد مرزوق شاعري)	PN (PAS)	53,933; 69.36%

=== State constituency ===
Parliamentary constituency	State constituency						
Parliamentary constituency	1955–1959*	1959–1974	1974–1986	1986–1995	1995–2004	2004–2018	2018–present
Pengkalan Chepa				Banggol			
Pengkalan Chepa					Chempaka		
Pengkalan Chepa			Kemumin				
Pengkalan Chepa					Kijang		
Pengkalan Chepa					Panchor		
Pengkalan Chepa			Semut Api				
Pengkalan Chepa			Sering				

=== Historical boundaries ===
State Constituency	Area				
State Constituency	1974	1984	1994	2003	2018
Banggol		Banggol; Kampung Kok Pasir; Kampung Redang; Kijang; Tanjung Mas			
Chempaka			Chempaka; Kampung Baung; Pengkalan Chepa; Pulau Gajah; Sabak		
Kemumin	Kampung Cherang; Panji; Pengkalan Chepa; Pulau Belacan; Sabak	Kedai Lalat; Pulau Gajah; Panji; Sabak; Sering			
Kijang			Banggol; Kampung Gok Kapor; Kampung Kuala Besar; Kijang; Semut Api		
Panchor			Cherang Laut; Kemumin; Pulau Belacan; Sering; Wakaf Aik	Kampung Panji; Kemumin; Sering; Panchor; Pulau Belacan	
Semut Api	Banggol; Kampung Che Latiff; Kampung Kok Pasir; Semut Api; Tanjung Mas	Kampung Badang; Kampung Che Latiff; Kampung Jambu; Pengkalan Chepa; Semut Api			
Sering	Gong Dermin; Jejulok; Kampung Budi; Kedai Lalat; Sering				

=== Current state assembly members ===
No.	State Constituency	Member	Coalition (Party)
N05	Kijang	Izani Husin	PN (PAS)
N06	Chempaka	Nik Asma' Bahrum Nik Abdullah	PN (PAS)
N07	Panchor	Mohd Amar Abdullah	PN (PAS)

=== Local governments & postcodes ===
No.	State Constituency	Local Government	Postcode
N05	Kijang	Kota Bharu Municipal Council	15000, 15200, 15350, 15400, 16100, 16150 Kota Bharu; 16020 Bachok
N06	Chempaka	Kota Bharu Municipal Council	15000, 15200, 15350, 15400, 16100, 16150 Kota Bharu; 16020 Bachok
N07	Panchor	Kota Bharu Municipal Council	15000, 15200, 15350, 15400, 16100, 16150 Kota Bharu; 16020 Bachok

== Election results ==
Malaysian general election, 2022
Party	Candidate	Votes	%	∆%
PAS	Ahmad Marzuk Shaary	53,933	69.36	▲14.48
BN	Mohd Hafiezulniezam Mohd Hasdin	15,633	20.14	▼12.46
PH	Nik Faizah Nik Othman	7,356	9.46	▲9.46
Independent	Mohamad Redzuan Razali	451	0.58	▲0.58
PEJUANG	Wan Ahmad Nasri Wan Ismail	358	0.46	▲0.46
Total valid votes		77,761	100.00	
Total rejected ballots		630		
Unreturned ballots		238		
Turnout		78,659	72.69	▼8.05
Registered electors		106,982		
Majority		38,270	49.22	▲26.94
PAS hold		Swing		
Source(s) https://lom.agc.gov.my/ilims/upload/portal/akta/outputp/1753266/PUB%20607%20(2022).pdf

Malaysian general election, 2018
Party	Candidate	Votes	%	∆%
PAS	Ahmad Marzuk Shaary	32,592	54.88	▼9.09
BN	Zaluzi Sulaiman	19,360	32.60	▼3.43
PKR	Mohamad Ibrahim	7,435	12.52	▲12.52
Total valid votes		59,387	100.00	
Total rejected ballots		739		
Unreturned ballots		736		
Turnout		60,862	80.74	▼4.63
Registered electors		75,384		
Majority		13,232	22.28	▼5.66
PAS hold		Swing		
Source(s) "His Majesty's Government Gazette - Notice of Contested Election, Parliament for the State of Kelantan [P.U. (B) 234/2018]" (PDF). Attorney General's Chambers of Malaysia. 3 May 2018. "Federal Government Gazette - Results of Contested Election and Statements of the Poll after the Official Addition of Votes, Parliamentary Constituencies for the State of Kelantan [P.U. (B) 308/2018]" (PDF). Attorney General's Chambers of Malaysia. 28 May 2018.

Malaysian general election, 2013
Party	Candidate	Votes	%	∆%
PAS	Izani Husin	34,617	63.97	▲0.57
BN	Dali Husin	19,497	36.03	▼0.57
Total valid votes		54,114	100.00	
Total rejected ballots		683		
Unreturned ballots		188		
Turnout		54,985	85.37	▲3.14
Registered electors		64,409		
Majority		15,120	27.94	▲1.14
PAS hold		Swing		
Source(s) "Federal Government Gazette - Notice of Contested Election, Parliament for the State of Kelantan [P.U. (B) 171/2013]" (PDF). Attorney General's Chambers of Malaysia. 26 April 2013. "Federal Government Gazette - Results of Contested Election and Statements of the Poll after the Official Addition of Votes, Parliamentary Constituencies for the State of Kelantan [P.U. (B) 212/2013]" (PDF). Attorney General's Chambers of Malaysia. 22 May 2013. Archived from the original (PDF) on 29 December 2019.

Malaysian general election, 2008
Party	Candidate	Votes	%	∆%
PAS	Abdul Halim Abdul Rahman	26,763	63.40	▲4.52
BN	Rahim Mohd Zain	15,452	36.60	▼4.52
Total valid votes		42,215	100.00	
Total rejected ballots		564		
Unreturned ballots		270		
Turnout		43,049	82.23	▲1.65
Registered electors		52,350		
Majority		11,311	26.80	▲9.04
PAS hold		Swing		

Malaysian general election, 2004
Party	Candidate	Votes	%	∆%
PAS	Abdul Halim Abdul Rahman	20,621	58.88	▼16.36
BN	Nik Mohd Zain Omar	14,399	41.12	▲16.36
Total valid votes		35,020	100.00	
Total rejected ballots		818		
Unreturned ballots		297		
Turnout		36,135	80.58	▲4.08
Registered electors		44,843		
Majority		6,222	17.76	▼32.72
PAS hold		Swing		

Malaysian general election, 1999
Party	Candidate	Votes	%	∆%
PAS	Nik Mohd. Amar Nik Abdullah	23,765	75.24	▲7.09
BN	Mohd Noor Deris	7,820	24.76	▼6.35
Total valid votes		31,585	100.00	
Total rejected ballots		486		
Unreturned ballots		678		
Turnout		32,749	76.50	▼6.78
Registered electors		42,456		
Majority		15,945	50.48	▲13.44
PAS hold		Swing		

Malaysian general election, 1995
Party	Candidate	Votes	%	∆%
PAS	Nik Mohd. Amar Nik Abdullah	20,410	68.15	▼5.30
BN	Ismail Mat	9,316	31.11	▲4.56
KITA	Yusof Mat	221	0.74	▲0.74
Total valid votes		29,947	100.00	
Total rejected ballots		1,486		
Unreturned ballots		3,765		
Turnout		35,198	83.28	▲7.32
Registered electors		42,264		
Majority		11,094	37.04	▼9.86
PAS hold		Swing		

Malaysian general election, 1990
Party	Candidate	Votes	%	∆%
PAS	Nik Abdullah Arshad	27,321	73.45	▲16.68
BN	Mohamed Apandi Ali	9,874	26.55	▼16.68
Total valid votes		37,195	100.00	
Total rejected ballots		706		
Unreturned ballots		0		
Turnout		37,901	75.96	▲2.30
Registered electors		49,897		
Majority		17,447	46.90	▲33.36
PAS hold		Swing		

Malaysian general election, 1986
Party	Candidate	Votes	%	∆%
PAS	Nik Abdullah Arshad	17,501	56.77	▼2.71
BN	Wan Ismail Ibrahim	13,326	43.23	▲2.71
Total valid votes		30,827	100.00	
Total rejected ballots		687		
Unreturned ballots		0		
Turnout		31,514	73.66	▼5.07
Registered electors		42,785		
Majority		4,175	13.54	▼5.42
PAS hold		Swing		

Malaysian general election, 1982
Party	Candidate	Votes	%	∆%
PAS	Nik Abdul Aziz Nik Mat	16,759	59.48	▲4.95
BN	Hassan Harun	11,417	40.52	▼4.95
Total valid votes		28,176	100.00	
Total rejected ballots		731		
Unreturned ballots		0		
Turnout		28,907	78.73	▲2.90
Registered electors		36,716		
Majority		5,342	18.96	▲9.90
PAS hold		Swing		

Malaysian general election, 1978
Party	Candidate	Votes	%	∆%
PAS	Nik Abdul Aziz Nik Mat	11,897	54.53	▲54.53
BN	Muhammad Noor Ali	9,919	45.47	▼28.41
Total valid votes		21,816	100.00	
Total rejected ballots		293		
Unreturned ballots		0		
Turnout		22,109	75.83	▲13.73
Registered electors		29,156		
Majority		1,978	9.06	▼38.70
PAS gain from BN		Swing		?

Malaysian general election, 1974
Party	Candidate	Votes	%
BN	Nik Abdul Aziz Nik Mat	13,243	73.88
Independent	Umar Ibrahim	4,682	26.12
Total valid votes		17,925	100.00
Total rejected ballots		1,353	
Unreturned ballots		0	
Turnout		19,278	62.10
Registered electors		31,042	
Majority		8,561	47.76
This was a new constituency created.
