= Ketereh (federal constituency) =

Federal constituency of Kelantan, Malaysia

Ketereh (P026)
Kelantan constituency

Federal constituency
- Legislature: Dewan Rakyat
- MP: Khlir Mohd Nor; PN
- Constituency created: 2003
- First contested: 2004
- Last contested: 2022

Demographics
- Population (2020): 108,448
- Electors (2023): 85,899
- Area (km²): 141
- Pop. density (per km²): 769.1

Ketereh is a federal constituency in Kota Bharu District, Kelantan, Malaysia, that has been represented in the Dewan Rakyat since 2004. Ketereh is between Kota Bharu and Machang.

The federal constituency was created in the 2003 redistribution and is mandated to return a single member to the Dewan Rakyat under the first past the post voting system.

== Demographics ==
https://live.chinapress.com.my/ge15/parliament/KELANTAN

Ethnic breakdown of Ketereh's electorate as of 2022
1. Malay (97.1%)
2. Chinese (1.90%)
3. Other ethnicities (0.90%)
4. Indian (0.10%)

As of 2020, Ketereh has a population of 108,448 people.

Age breakdown of Ketereh's electorate as of 2022
1. 18-20 (6.95%)
2. 21-29 (24.0%)
3. 30-39 (25.0%)
4. 40-49 (17.0%)
5. 50-59 (12.9%)
6. 60-69 (8.84%)
7. 70-79 (4.06%)
8. 80-89 (1.08%)
9. above 90 (0.21%)
Gender breakdown of Ketereh's electorate as of 2022
1. Male (50.1%)
2. Female (49.9%)

== History ==
=== Polling districts ===
According to the federal gazette issued on 18 July 2023, the Ketereh constituency is divided into 29 polling districts.

State constituency	Polling Districts	Code	Location
Melor (N23)	Peringat	026/23/01	SK Peringat
Melor (N23)	Badak Mati	026/23/02	SK Padang Mokan
Melor (N23)	Bechah Keranji	026/23/03	SK Bechah Keranji
Melor (N23)	Padang Kala	026/23/04	SK Padang Kala
Melor (N23)	Padang Raja	026/23/05	SMA Melor
Melor (N23)	Melor	026/23/06	SMK Melor
Melor (N23)	Melor Lama	026/23/07	SK Sri Melor
Melor (N23)	Tegayong	026/23/08	SK Tegayong
Melor (N23)	Pangkal Pisang	026/23/09	SK Raja Abdullah
Kadok (N24)	Lachang	026/24/01	GIATMARA Ketereh
Kadok (N24)	Buloh Poh	026/24/02	SK Buloh Poh
Kadok (N24)	Berangan	026/24/03	SK Kadok
Kadok (N24)	Perol	026/24/04	SK Perol
Kadok (N24)	Kadok	026/24/05	SMK Kadok
Kadok (N24)	Kampung Talang	026/24/06	SMU (A) Hamidah Padang Lepai
Kadok (N24)	Dusun Rendah	026/25/07	SMU (A) Ittihadiah Tanjung Pagar
Kadok (N24)	Binjal	026/24/08	SK Kubang Kiat
Kadok (N24)	But Chengal	026/24/09	SK Kampong Chengal
Kok Lanas (N25)	Kampung Gondang	026/25/01	SK Gondang
Kok Lanas (N25)	Padang Tengah	026/25/02	SMU (A) Ittihadiah Tanjung Pagar
Kok Lanas (N25)	Ketereh	026/25/03	SK Seri Ketereh
Kok Lanas (N25)	Padang Lembek	026/25/04	SK Ketereh
Kok Lanas (N25)	Hutan Pasir	026/25/05	SMK Ketereh
Kok Lanas (N25)	Kampung Guntong	026/25/06	SMK Kok Lanas
Kok Lanas (N25)	Pangkal Kalong	026/25/07	SK Pangkal Kalong
Kok Lanas (N25)	Kedai Kok Lanas	026/25/08	SK Kok Lanas
Kok Lanas (N25)	Setek	026/25/09	SM Persendirian Cina Chung Hwa
Kok Lanas (N25)	Kampung Batu Tinggi	026/25/10	SK Banggol Saman
Kok Lanas (N25)	Kampung Sokor	026/25/11	SK Desa Pahlawan

=== Representation history ===
Members of Parliament for Ketereh
Parliament	No	Years	Member	Party
Constituency created, renamed from Peringat
11th	P026	2004–2008	Md Alwi Che Ahmad (مد علوي چئ أحمد)	BN (UMNO)
12th	P026	2008–2013	Ab Aziz Ab Kadir (عبدالعزيز عبدالقدير)	PR (PKR)
13th	P026	2013–2018	Annuar Musa (أنور موسى)	BN (UMNO)
14th	P026	2018–2022	Annuar Musa (أنور موسى)	BN (UMNO)
15th	P026	2022–present	Khlir Mohd Nor (خلير محمد نور)	PN (BERSATU)

=== State constituency ===
Parliamentary constituency	State constituency						
Parliamentary constituency	1955–1959*	1959–1974	1974–1986	1986–1995	1995–2004	2004–2018	2018–present
Ketereh						Kadok	
Ketereh						Kok Lanas	
Ketereh						Melor	

=== Historical boundaries ===
State Constituency	Area	
State Constituency	2003	2018
Kadok	Buloh Poh; Dewan Beta; Kadok; Kampung Perol; Kubang Kiat	Buloh Poh; Kadok; Kampung Perol; Kampung Telang; Kubang Kiat
Kok Lanas	Kampung Padang Lembek; Kampung Sokor; Ketereh; Kok Lanas; Pangkal Kalong	
Melor	Melor; Pangkal Langkuas; Pangkal Pisang; Pauh Lima; Peringat	

=== Current state assembly members ===
No.	State Constituency	Member	Coalition (Party)
N23	Melor	Wan Rohimi Wan Daud	PN (PAS)
N24	Kadok	Azami Md. Nor	PN (PAS)
N25	Kok Lanas	Mohamed Farid Mohamed Zawawi	PN (WAWASAN)

=== Local governments & postcodes ===
No.	State Constituency	Local Government	Postcode
N23	Melor	Ketereh District Council	16400 Melor; 16450 Ketereh; 16500 Kem Desa Pahlawan
N24	Kadok	Ketereh District Council	16400 Melor; 16450 Ketereh; 16500 Kem Desa Pahlawan
N25	Kok Lanas	Ketereh District Council	16400 Melor; 16450 Ketereh; 16500 Kem Desa Pahlawan

== Election results ==
Malaysian general election, 2022
Party	Candidate	Votes	%	∆%
PAS	Khlir Mohd Nor	40,542	64.49	▲25.25
BN	Marzuani Ardila Ariffin	17,435	27.74	▼20.21
PH	Rahimi L Muhamud	4,662	7.42	▲7.42
PUTRA	Hanif Ibrahim	233	0.35	▲0.35
Total valid votes		62,682	100.00	
Total rejected ballots		900		
Unreturned ballots		298		
Turnout		64,060	73.71	▼9.68
Registered electors		85,281		
Majority		23,107	36.75	▲28.04
PAS gain from BN		Swing		?
Source(s) https://lom.agc.gov.my/ilims/upload/portal/akta/outputp/1753266/PUB%20607%20(2022).pdf

Malaysian general election, 2018
Party	Candidate	Votes	%	∆%
BN	Annuar Musa	25,467	47.95	▼2.97
PAS	Wan Ismail Wan Jusoh	20,841	39.24	▲39.24
PKR	Mohd Radzi Md Jidin	6,799	12.80	▼36.28
Total valid votes		53,107	100.00	
Total rejected ballots		781		
Unreturned ballots		516		
Turnout		54,404	83.39	▼3.25
Registered electors		65,238		
Majority		4,626	8.71	▲6.87
BN hold		Swing		
Source(s) "His Majesty's Government Gazette - Notice of Contested Election, Parliament for the State of Kelantan [P.U. (B) 234/2018]" (PDF). Attorney General's Chambers of Malaysia. 3 May 2018. "Federal Government Gazette - Results of Contested Election and Statements of the Poll after the Official Addition of Votes, Parliamentary Constituencies for the State of Kelantan [P.U. (B) 308/2018]" (PDF). Attorney General's Chambers of Malaysia. 28 May 2018.

Malaysian general election, 2013
Party	Candidate	Votes	%	∆%
BN	Annuar Musa	26,912	50.92	▲1.38
PKR	Ab Aziz Ab Kadir	25,938	49.08	▼1.38
Total valid votes		52,850	100.00	
Total rejected ballots		876		
Unreturned ballots		180		
Turnout		53,906	86.64	▲1.69
Registered electors		62,217		
Majority		974	1.84	▲0.92
BN gain from PKR		Swing		?
Source(s) "Federal Government Gazette - Notice of Contested Election, Parliament for the State of Kelantan [P.U. (B) 171/2013]" (PDF). Attorney General's Chambers of Malaysia. 26 April 2013. "Federal Government Gazette - Results of Contested Election and Statements of the Poll after the Official Addition of Votes, Parliamentary Constituencies for the State of Kelantan [P.U. (B) 212/2013]" (PDF). Attorney General's Chambers of Malaysia. 22 May 2013. Archived from the original (PDF) on 2019-12-29.

Malaysian general election, 2008
Party	Candidate	Votes	%	∆%
PKR	Ab Aziz Ab Kadir	21,738	50.46	▲4.35
BN	Annuar Musa	21,338	49.54	▼4.35
Total valid votes		43,076	100.00	
Total rejected ballots		993		
Unreturned ballots		308		
Turnout		44,377	84.95	▲2.82
Registered electors		52,240		
Majority		400	0.92	▼6.86
PKR gain from BN		Swing		?

Malaysian general election, 2004
Party	Candidate	Votes	%
BN	Md Alwi Che Ahmad	20,024	53.89
PKR	Muhamad Mustafa	17,136	46.11
Total valid votes		37,160	100.00
Total rejected ballots		751	
Unreturned ballots		276	
Turnout		38,187	82.13
Registered electors		46,495	
Majority		2,888	7.78
This was a new constituency created.
