= Nik Abdul Aziz Nik Mat =

Malaysian politician (1931–2015)

Yang Berbahagia Dato' Bentara Setia Tan Sri Dato' Tuan Guru Nik Abdul Aziz Nik Mat PSM SJMK KMN JP
- نئ عبدالعزيز نئ مت
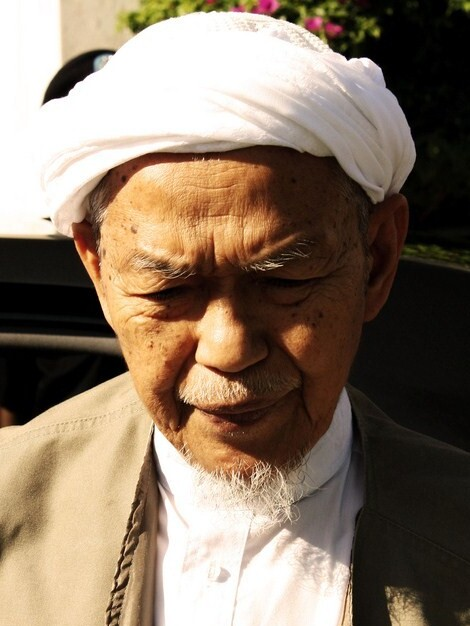
- Nik Abdul Aziz in 2009

Menteri Besar of Kelantan
- In office 22 October 1990 – 6 May 2013
- Monarchs: Sultan Ismail Petra; Sultan Muhammad V
- Deputy: Mohd Rozali Isohak (1990-1996); Abdul Halim Abdul Rahman (1990-2004); Ahmad Yakob (2004-2013)
- Preceded by: Mohamed Yaacob
- Succeeded by: Ahmad Yakob

2nd Spiritual Leader of Malaysian Islamic Party
- In office 1991 – 12 February 2015
- Preceded by: Yusof Rawa
- Succeeded by: Haron Din

Member of the Malaysian Parliament for Pengkalan Chepa
- In office 1974–1986
- Preceded by: New constituency
- Succeeded by: Nik Abdullah Arshad

Member of the Malaysian Parliament for Kelantan Hilir
- In office 1967–1974
- Preceded by: Ahmad Abdullah
- Succeeded by: Constituency abolished

Member of the Kelantan State Assembly for Chempaka
- In office 1995 – 12 February 2015
- Preceded by: New constituency
- Succeeded by: Ahmad Fathan Mahmood

Member of the Kelantan State Assembly for Semut Api
- In office 1986–1995
- Preceded by: Wan Mamat Wan Yusof
- Succeeded by: Constituency abolished

PAS Head of the Ulama Wing
- In office 1971–1995

Kelantan Pan-Malaysian Islamic Party Commissioner
- In office 1978–2013
- Succeeded by: Ahmad Yakob

Personal details
- Born: Nik Abdul Aziz bin Nik Mat; 10 January 1931 Kampung Pulau Melaka, Kota Bharu, Kelantan, British Malaya (now Malaysia)
- Died: 12 February 2015 (aged 84) Kampung Pulau Melaka, Kota Bharu, Kelantan, Malaysia
- Resting place: Tanah Perkuburan Pulau Melaka, Kota Bharu
- Party: PAS
- Other political affiliations: Alliance (1972–1973); BN (1973–1978); APU (1990–1996); BA (1999–2004); PR (2008–2015)
- Spouse: Puan Sri Tuan Sabariah Tuan Ishak (m. 1963)
- Relations: Tuan Ibrahim Tuan Man (nephew); Nik Muhammad Zawawi Salleh (nephew); Ahmad Dusuki Abdul Rani (nephew)
- Children: 10, including Nik Abduh and Nik Omar
- Parents: Nik Mat Raja Banjar; Aminah Abdul Majid
- Education: Al-Azhar University; Darul Uloom Deoband

Nik Abdul Aziz bin Nik Mat (Jawi: نئ عبدالعزيز بن نئ مت; 10 January 1931 – 12 February 2015) was a Malaysian politician and Muslim cleric. He was the Menteri Besar of Kelantan from 1990 to 2013 and the Mursyidul Am or Spiritual Leader of the Pan-Malaysian Islamic Party (PAS) from 1991 until his death in 2015. Overall, his career as an elected politician lasted for some 48 years following his election to the Parliament of Malaysia in 1967.

Nik Aziz was notable for his racially progressive stances in contrast to other contemporary figures within PAS's leadership that made it appeal to periphery non-Malay, non-Muslim electoral bases contributing to historic coalitions with left-leaning and multicultural parties like in Pakatan Rakyat; his death however led said leadership to purge like-minded progressives who splintered as the National Trust Party, as well shifting themselves further right towards Malay supremacism.

== Early life ==
Nik Abdul Aziz was born in Kota Bharu in 1931 as the second of five siblings. He was raised by a single father (Tok Kura) who was an aspiring blacksmith. Nik Aziz's Islamic studies began in pondok schools in Kelantan and Terengganu. He went on to study at Darul Uloom Deoband in Uttar Pradesh, India for five years. He obtained his Bachelor of Arts in Arabic Studies and Master of Arts in Islamic jurisprudence from Al-Azhar University, Egypt. During his university studies, he was one of the witnesses and a civilian to have lived in the heat of the Arab-Israeli Conflict.

Having returned from Egypt, Nik Aziz worked as a teacher at various religious schools in Kelantan including his father's pondok (religious school). Nik Aziz started to teach at various mosques and Pondok within Kelantan and other states. He became a respected Islamic scholar earning the nickname "Tuan Guru." (means 'Master/sifu of Scholar or teacher' in Malay)

== Political career ==
Nik Aziz joined PAS in 1967. He contested and won the Kelantan Hilir parliamentary seat by-election in that same year, and held the seat (later renamed Pengkalan Chepa) until 1986. In 1982, he was part of a movement by young members to bring change to the party leadership. PAS had lost the Kelantan state elections in 1978 and, as PAS state commissioner, Nik Aziz began to question president Asri Muda's leadership. Finally, in the PAS Muktamar (General Assembly) that year, Asri was forced to resign.

After stepping aside from federal politics, Nik Aziz won a seat in the Kelantan State Assembly in the 1986 general elections. In 1990, PAS managed to wrest control of Kelantan back from Barisan Nasional. In his capacity as party leader in the state, Nik Aziz became Menteri Besar of Kelantan. He succeeded Yusof Rawa as spiritual leader of PAS in 1991.

Nik Aziz's government was re-elected on four occasions (1995, 1999, 2004, 2008), until his retirement in 2013. During the 1990s, his administration in Kelantan frequently clashed on the role of Islam in Malaysia with the then Prime Minister Mahathir Mohamad. In contrast with the racially exclusive ruling party UMNO, he openly rejected communal politics.

Nik Aziz commanded support from a large number of non-Muslims in Malaysia and played a leading role during PAS' increase in popularity among non-Muslims.

In May 2013, Nik Aziz publicly stated that he did not consent on any co-operation between United Malays National Organisation (UMNO) and Malaysian Islamic Party (PAS) as long as he was alive. However, in September 2019, when PAS and UMNO signed the formal charter of alliance, named Muafakat Nasional, PAS president Abdul Hadi Awang claimed that Nik Aziz had already consented to the cooperation while he was alive.

== Issues ==
=== Hardline views ===
Nik Aziz drew some criticism for his hardline Islamic views. His advocacy of Islamic shariah law for all Malay Muslims drew criticism. According to Fox News, Nik Aziz suggested that women would be at a lower risk of being raped if they abandoned using their lipstick and perfume. He was also recorded once stating that fashionable and sexy-dressing women deserved to be raped during a speech.

=== The "Allah" issue ===
In 2012, there was an issue of Catholics in Malaysia using the Arabic term for "God"; "Allah" in their Christian Bible. Initially, Nik Aziz stated that the word "Allah" can be used by non-Muslims as the origin of the word itself is evidently pre-Islamic. The issue caused a stir in the Muslim community. The PAS party was almost divided into two blocs; one that supported the use of the word, and one that did not. Aiming to restore unity in PAS, Nik Aziz took back his words and disapproved of the word "Allah" being used by non-Muslims.

=== Son detained under ISA ===
His son Nik Adli was held under the Malaysian Internal Security Act in 2001 for alleged terrorist activities including planning jihad, possession of weapons, and membership in the Kumpulan Mujahidin Malaysia (KMM), an Islamist extremist group. After 5 years in detention without trial, he was released.

=== Religious minorities ===
Perhaps inspired by his education in India, where Muslims are a minority, Nik Aziz promoted tolerance towards Kelantan's minorities. This included the state's Chinese community. Nik Aziz visited Chinese temples and joined Chinese New Year celebrations, and his government allocated land to the mandarin-speaking Chung Hwa Independent High School. During a visit by Lee Kuan Yew to Kelantan, Nik Aziz stated that if PAS governed Malaysia, that its treatment of Malaysian Chinese nationally would reflect their treatment in Kelantan.

== Retirement and death ==
During the 2013 election, PAS once again won a majority of seats to form a Kelantan state government. Nik Aziz announced his retirement as Chief Minister of Kelantan, the post he held since 1990. His successor is Nik Aziz's former deputy Chief Minister Ahmad Yaakob, who took over his office to replace him as Kelantan's Chief Minister. Over the ensuing two years, Nik Aziz became increasingly ill with prostate cancer, and died on 12 February 2015 (aged 84) at 9.40 p.m. Malaysia Standard Time (UTC+08:00); at his residence in Kampung Pulau Melaka, Kota Bharu. The following day, more than 10,000 people attended his funeral at Masjid Tok Guru, his local mosque. His death triggered the Kelantan State Assembly seat of 2015 Chempaka by-election.

== Election results ==
Parliament of Malaysia
Year	Constituency	Candidate	Votes	Pct	Opponent(s)	Votes	Pct	Ballots cast	Majority	Turnout
1967	P016 Kelantan Hilir	Nik Abdul Aziz Nik Mat (PAS)	11,855	57.97%	Tengku Noor Asiah Tengku Ahmad (UMNO)	8,596	42.03%	20,737	3,259	74.84%
1969	P016 Kelantan Hilir	Nik Abdul Aziz Nik Mat (PAS)	13,635	60.73%	Mohamed Salleh Ibrahim (UMNO)	8,817	39.27%	23,183	4,818	74.64%
1974	P017 Pengkalan Chepa	Nik Abdul Aziz Nik Mat (PAS)^{1}	13,243	73.88%	Umar Ibrahim (IND)	4,682	26.12%	19,278	8,561	62.10%
1978	P017 Pengkalan Chepa	Nik Abdul Aziz Nik Mat (PAS)	11,897	54.53%	Muhammad Noor Ali (UMNO)	9,919	45.47%	N/A	1,978	N/A
1982	P017 Pengkalan Chepa	Nik Abdul Aziz Nik Mat (PAS)	16,759	59.48%	Hassan Harun (UMNO)	11,417	40.52%	28,907	5,342	78.73%
1986	P023 Bachok	Nik Abdul Aziz Nik Mat (PAS)	16,347	49.59%	Mohd. Zain Abdullah (HAMIM)	16,617	50.41%	33,627	270	80.08%

Note: ^{1} PAS were in the Alliance (1972–1973) and later Barisan Nasional (1973–1978) coalition government.

Kelantan State Legislative Assembly
Year	Constituency	Candidate	Votes	Pct	Opponent(s)	Votes	Pct	Ballots cast	Majority	Turnout
1986	N04 Semut Api	Nik Abdul Aziz Nik Mat (PAS)	6,233	60.36%	Hafsah Osman (UMNO)	4,094	39.64%	10,754	2,139	74.97%
1990	N04 Semut Api	Nik Abdul Aziz Nik Mat (PAS)	9,504	79.10%	Wan Mat @ Wan Mamat Wan Yusoff (UMNO)	2,511	20.90%	12,341	6,993	76.22%
1995	N05 Chempaka	Nik Abdul Aziz Nik Mat (PAS)	7,851	72.80%	Yusoff Isa (UMNO)	2,934	27.20%	11,413	4,917	74.80%
1999	N05 Chempaka	Nik Abdul Aziz Nik Mat (PAS)	8,649	74.48%	Ropli Ishak (UMNO)	2,302	19.82%	11,801	6,347	78.26%
2004	N06 Chempaka	Nik Abdul Aziz Nik Mat (PAS)	7,889	65.10%	Ruhani Mamat (UMNO)	4,195	34.62%	12,407	3,694	81.47%
2008	N06 Chempaka	Nik Abdul Aziz Nik Mat (PAS)	9,514	64.13%	Nik Mohd Zain Omar (UMNO)	5,265	35.49%	15,077	4,249	84.62%
2013	N06 Chempaka	Nik Abdul Aziz Nik Mat (PAS)	12,310	67.92%	Wan Razman Wan Abdul Razak (UMNO)	5,810	32.06%	18,360	6,500	85.94%

== Honours ==
=== Honours of Malaysia ===
- Malaysia
  - Commander of the Order of Loyalty to the Crown of Malaysia (PSM) – Tan Sri (2023 – posthumously)
  - Officer of the Order of the Defender of the Realm (KMN) (1974)
- Kelantan
  - Dato' Bentara Setia (2010)
  - Knight Grand Commander of the Order of the Life of the Crown of Kelantan (SJMK) – Dato' (1995)
  - Justice of the Peace (JP) (1968)

Political offices
Preceded by Mohamed Yaacob	Menteri Besar of Kelantan; 22 October 1990 – 6 May 2013	Succeeded by Ahmad Yaakob
Parliament of Malaysia
Preceded by Ahmad Abdullah	Member of Parliament for Kelantan Hilir; 1967–1974	Constituency abolished
New constituency	Member of Parliament for Pengkalan Chepa; 1974–1986	Succeeded by Nik Abdullah Arshad
New constituency	Member of Kelantan State Assembly for Chempaka; 1995 – 12 February 2015	Succeeded by Ahmad Fathan Mahmood
Preceded by Wan Mamat Wan Yusof	Member of Kelantan State Assembly for Semut Api; 1986–1995	Constituency abolished
Party political offices
Preceded by Yusof Rawa	Spiritual Leader of the Pan-Malaysian Islamic Party; 1991 – 12 February 2015	Succeeded by Haron Din
Preceded by	Pan-Malaysian Islamic Party Head of the Ulama Wing; 1971–1995	Succeeded by
Preceded by	Kelantan Pan-Malaysian Islamic Party Commissioner; 1978–2013	Succeeded by Ahmad Yaakob
