= Md Alwi Che Ahmad =

Malaysian politician

Yang Berbahagia Datuk Seri Md Alwi Che Ahmad SMW PGDK JSM AMN
- مد علوي چئ أحمد

Member of the Kelantan State Legislative Assembly for Kok Lanas
- In office 8 March 2008 – 12 August 2023
- Preceded by: Annuar Musa (BN–UMNO)
- Succeeded by: Mohamed Farid Mohamed Zawawi (PN-BERSATU)
- Majority: 580 (2008); 169 (2013); 1,122 (2018)

Member of the Malaysian Parliament for Ketereh
- In office 21 March 2004 – 8 March 2008
- Preceded by: new constituency
- Succeeded by: Ab Aziz Ab Kadir (PR–PKR)
- Majority: 2,888 (2004)

Personal details
- Born: 15 June 1956 (age 69) Ketereh, Kota Bharu, Kelantan
- Party: United Malays National Organisation (UMNO)
- Other political affiliations: Barisan Nasional (BN)

Md Alwi bin Che Ahmad is a Malaysian politician who had served as member of Kelantan State Legislative assembly for Kok Lanas from March 2008 to August 2023. He is a member of United Malays National Organisation (UMNO), a component party of Barisan Nasional (BN).

== Election results ==
Parliament of Malaysia
Year	Constituency	Candidate	Votes	Pct	Opponent(s)	Votes	Pct	Ballots cast	Majority	Turnout
2004	P026 Ketereh	Md Alwi Che Ahmad (UMNO)	20,024	53.89%	Muhamad Mustafa (PKR)	17,136	46.11%	38,187	2,888	82.13%

Kelantan State Legislative Assembly
Year	Constituency	Candidate	Votes	Pct	Opponent(s)	Votes	Pct	Ballots cast	Majority	Turnout
2008	N25 Kok Lanas	Md Alwi Che Ahmad (UMNO)	8,319	51.81%	Ahmad Rusli Iberahim (PAS)	7,739	48.19%	16,651	580	86.74%
2013	N25 Kok Lanas	Md Alwi Che Ahmad (UMNO)	10,040	50.42%	Nik Mahadi Mahmood (PAS)	9,871	49.58%	20,185	169	87.70%
2018	N25 Kok Lanas	Md Alwi Che Ahmad (UMNO)	10,921	48.54%	Nik Mahadi Nik Mahmood (PAS)	9,799	43.55%	23,029	1,122	84.00%
2018	N25 Kok Lanas	Md Alwi Che Ahmad (UMNO)	10,921	48.54%	Mohd Hanapi Ismail (AMANAH)	1,779	7.91%	23,029	1,122	84.00%

== Honours ==
- Malaysia
  - Member of the Order of the Defender of the Realm (AMN) (1999)
  - Companion of the Order of Loyalty to the Crown of Malaysia (JSM) (2003)
- Sabah
  - Commander of the Order of Kinabalu (PGDK) – Datuk (2005)
- Federal Territory (Malaysia)
  - Grand Commander of the Order of the Territorial Crown (SMW) – Datuk Seri (2021)
