= 2015 Chempaka by-election =

Election in Malaysia

- 22 March 2015

Chempaka seat in the Kelantan State Legislative Assembly
	PAS	IND	IND
Candidate	Ahmad Fathan Mahmood	Sharif Mahmood	Fadzillah Hussin
Party	PAS	Independent	Independent
Alliance	PR
Popular vote	10,899	807	89
Percentage	91.8%	6.8%	0.75%
	IND	IND
Candidate	Izat Bukhary Ismail Bukhary	Aslah Mamat
Party	Independent	Independent
Popular vote	51	27
Percentage	0.43%	0.23%
Chempaka assemblyman before election
Nik Aziz Nik Mat
PAS
Elected Chempaka assemblyman
Ahmad Fathan Mahmood
PAS

A by-election was held for the Kelantan State Assembly seat of Chempaka on 22 March 2015 following the nomination day on 10 March 2015. The seat fell vacant after the death of the incumbent five-term assemblyman and former Menteri Besar of Kelantan, Nik Abdul Aziz Nik Mat from prostate cancer in Kubang Kerian, Kelantan on 12 February 2015. Niz Aziz was a member of PAS, part of the Pakatan Rakyat coalition. Nik Abdul Aziz had retained the seat in the 13th General Election in 2013 by beating Wan Razman Wan Abd Razak of the Barisan Nasional with a majority of 6,500 votes.

The Chempaka by-election saw a five-way battle between PAS's Ahmad Fathan Mahmood and independent candidates Izat Bukhary Ismail Bukhary, Fadzillah Hussin, Aslah Mamat and Sharif Mahmood. Sharif Mahmood is the vice-president of Malay rights group Perkasa and also a member of the United Malays National Organisation (UMNO). He and Fadzillah Hussin were sacked by UMNO for contesting in the Chempaka by-election. UMNO had resolved not to contest the election, ostensibly to focus on flood relief efforts in Kelantan.

== Results ==
PAS candidate Ahmad Fathan Mahmood won the election with a landslide garnering 96.4% of the votes. All four independent candidates lost their election deposits for failing to garner 10% of the votes.

Kelantan state by-election, 22 March 2015: Chempaka The by-election was called due to the death of incumbent, Nik Abdul Aziz Nik Mat.
Party	Candidate	Votes	%	∆%
PAS	Ahmad Fathan Mahmood	10,899	91.80	
Independent	Sharif Mahmood	807	6.80	
Independent	Fadzillah Hussin	89	0.75	
Independent	Izat Bukhary Ismail Bukhary	51	0.43	
Independent	Aslah Mamat	27	0.23	
Total valid votes		11,873	100.00	
Total rejected ballots		140		
Unreturned ballots		7		
Turnout		12,020	54.91	
Registered electors		21,890		
Majority		10,092		
PAS hold		Swing		
Source(s) "Pilihan Raya Kecil N.06 Chempaka". Election Commission of Malaysia. Archived from the original on 2018-09-19. "Federal Government Gazette - Notice of Contested Election - By-election of the State Legislative Assembly of N.06 Chempaka for the State of Kelantan [P.U. (B) 88/2015]" (PDF). Attorney General's Chambers of Malaysia. 10 March 2015. "Federal Government Gazette - Results of Contested Election and Statement of the Poll after the Official Addition of Votes for the By-election of N.06 Chempaka [P.U. (B) 150/2015]" (PDF). Attorney General's Chambers of Malaysia. 2 April 2015. Archived from the original (PDF) on 2019-12-28.
