= Mohamed Farid Mohamed Zawawi =

Malaysian politician

Yang Berhormat Dato' Mohamed Farid Mohamed Zawawi DJMK DIMP MLA

Deputy Speaker of the Kelantan State Legislative Assembly
- Incumbent
- Assumed office 5 September 2023
- Monarch: Muhammad V
- Speaker: Mohd Amar Abdullah
- Preceded by: Abdul Fattah Mahmood
- Constituency: Kok Lanas

Member of the Kelantan State Legislative Assembly for Kok Lanas
- Incumbent
- Assumed office 12 August 2023
- Preceded by: Md Alwi Che Ahmad (BN–UMNO)
- Majority: 8,219 (2023)

Member of the Supreme Leadership Council of the Malaysian United Indigenous Party
- Incumbent
- Assumed office 23 August 2020
- President: Muhyiddin Yassin

Personal details
- Party: Malaysian United Indigenous Party (BERSATU) (2023-2026); National Vision Party (Malaysia) (WAWASAN) (since 2026)
- Other political affiliations: Perikatan Nasional (PN)
- Profession: Accountant

Mohamed Farid bin Mohamed Zawawi is a Malaysian politician who served as Deputy Speaker of the Kelantan State Legislative Assembly under Speaker Mohd Amar Abdullah since September 2023 as well as Member of the Kelantan State Legislative Assembly (MLA) for Kok Lanas since August 2023. He is a member of Malaysian United Indigenous Party (BERSATU), a component party of Perikatan Nasional (PN) coalitions.

== Career ==
Mohamed Farid Mohamed Zawawi is a businessman who is qualified as a Chartered Accountant. He established a cooperative business called Koperasi Wawasan Malaysia Berhad of which he is the chairman of the board of directors. He is also a Council Member of the People's Trust Council.

== Political career ==
In 2020, he was elected as BERSATU Divisional Chief of Kota Bharu. In the 2023 state election, Mohamed Farid Mohamed Zawawi made his electoral debut after being nominated by PN contested on Kok Lanas. He was elected as Kok Lanas assemblyman with the majority of 8,219 votes.

In September 2023, he was elected as Deputy Speaker of the Kelantan State Legislative Assembly deputising for Mohd Amar Abdullah.

== Election results ==
Kelantan State Legislative Assembly
Year	Constituency	Candidate	Votes	Pct	Opponent(s)	Votes	Pct	Ballots cast	Majority	Turnout
2023	N25 Kok Lanas	Mohamed Farid Mohamed Zawawi (BERSATU)	15,478	68.07%	Ahmad Deraman (UMNO)	7,259	31.93%	23,419	8,219	65.64%

== Honours ==
- Kelantan
  - Kinght Commander Order of the Life of the Crown of Kelantan (DJMK) – Dato' (2025)
- Pahang
  - Knight Companion of the Order of the Crown of Pahang (DIMP) – Dato' (2008)
