= Md Yusnan Yusof =

Malaysian politician (1968–2021)

Md Yusnan Yusof JMK

Member of the Kelantan State Legislative Assembly for Melor
- In office 6 May 2013 – 30 April 2021
- Preceded by: Wan Ismail Wan Jusoh

Personal details
- Born: 1 July 1968 Ketereh, Kelantan, Malaysia
- Died: 30 April 2021 (aged 52) Ketereh, Kelantan, Malaysia
- Citizenship: Malaysian
- Party: PAS
- Other political affiliations: PR (2013-2015); MN (2019-2021); PN (2020-2021)
- Spouse: Romaini Mat Daud
- Children: 6
- Occupation: Politician

Md Yusnan Yusof (1 July 1968 — 30 April 2021) was a Malaysian politician from the Malaysian Islamic Party (PAS). He served as the Member of the Kelantan State Legislative Assembly for Melor from 2013 to 2021.

He died on 30 April 2021, leaving his widow, Romaini Mat Daud, and 6 children. Initially, there was a rumour that his death was due to the COVID-19 vaccine, although it was denied by his family. His body was later buried in Ketereh. As the seat was vacated, a by-election was supposed to be held but was postponed due to the emergency order declared in January in order to curb the COVID-19 pandemic.

== Election results ==
Kelantan State Legislative Assembly
Year	Constituency	Candidate	Votes	Pct	Opponent(s)	Votes	Pct	Ballots cast	Majority	Turnout
2013	N23 Melor	Md Yusnan Yusof (PAS)	10,590	55.70%	Mohamed Othman Omar (UMNO)	8,101	42.61%	19,014	2,489	86.10%
2018	N23 Melor	Md Yusnan Yusof (PAS)	7,820	44.47%	Azmi Ishak (UMNO)	7,173	40.79%	17,586	647	82.8%
2018	N23 Melor	Md Yusnan Yusof (PAS)	7,820	44.47%	Ab Aziz Ab Kadir (PKR)	2,122	12.07%	17,586	647	82.8%

== Honours ==
- Kelantan
  - Companion of the Order of the Life of the Crown of Kelantan (JMK) (2019)
