= Kelantan Hilir =

Kelantan constituency

Defunct federal constituency
- Legislature: Dewan Rakyat
- Constituency created: 1958
- Constituency abolished: 1974
- First contested: 1959
- Last contested: 1969

Kelantan Hilir was a federal constituency in Kelantan, Malaysia, that was represented in the Dewan Rakyat from 1959 to 1974.

The federal constituency was created in the 1974 redistribution and was mandated to return a single member to the Dewan Rakyat under the first past the post voting system.

== History ==
It was abolished in 1974 when it was redistributed.

=== Representation history ===
Members of Parliament for Kelantan Hilir
Parliament	No	Years	Member	Party	Vote Share
Constituency created from Kelantan Utara
Parliament of the Federation of Malaya
1st	P016	1959–1963	Wan Mustapha Ali (وان مصطفى علي)	PMIP	12,438; 74.19%
Parliament of Malaysia
1st	P016	1963–1964	Wan Mustapha Ali (وان مصطفى علي)	PMIP	12,438; 74.19%
2nd	P016	1964–1967	Ahmad Abdullah (احمد عبدالله)	PMIP	12,721; 66.20%
2nd	P016	1967–1969	Nik Abdul Aziz Nik Mat (نئ عبدالعزيز نئ مت)	PMIP	11,855; 57.97%
		1969–1971	Parliament was suspended		
3rd	P016	1971–1973	Nik Abdul Aziz Nik Mat (نئ عبدالعزيز نئ مت)	PMIP	13,635; 60.73%
3rd	P016	1973–1974	Nik Abdul Aziz Nik Mat (نئ عبدالعزيز نئ مت)	BN (PMIP)	13,635; 60.73%
Constituency abolished, split into Tumpat and Pengkalan Chepa

=== State constituency ===
Parliamentary constituency	State constituency						
Parliamentary constituency	1955–1959*	1959–1974	1974–1986	1986–1995	1995–2004	2004–2018	2018–present
Kelantan Hilir		Kota Bharu Pantai					
Kelantan Hilir		Kota Bharu Utara					
Kelantan Hilir		Kuala Kelantan					

=== Historical boundaries ===
State Constituency	Area
State Constituency	1959
Kota Bharu Pantai	Kampung Pulau Belacan; Kampung Sering; Kedai Lalat; Pengkalan Chepa; Sabak
Kota Bharu Utara	Kampung Banggol; Kampung Baung; Kampung Kok Pasir; Semut Api; Tanjung Mas
Kuala Kelantan	Kampung Chat; Kampung Gerong; Kampung Kedai Buloh; Kampung Kok Keli; Kampung Sungai Pinang

== Election results ==
Malaysian general election, 1969: Kelantan Hilir
Party	Candidate	Votes	%	∆%
PMIP	Nik Abdul Aziz Nik Mat	13,635	60.73	▲2.76
Alliance	Mohd. Salleh Ibrahim	8,817	39.27	▼2.76
Total valid votes		22,452	100.00	
Total rejected ballots		731		
Unreturned ballots		0		
Turnout		23,183	74.64	▼0.20
Registered electors		31,060		
Majority		4,818	21.46	▼5.52
PMIP hold		Swing		

Malaysian general by-election, 21 October 1967: Kelantan Hilir Upon the death of incumbent, Ahmad Abdullah
Party	Candidate	Votes	%	∆%
PMIP	Nik Abdul Aziz Nik Mat	11,855	57.97	▼8.23
Alliance	Tengku Noor Asiah Tengku Ahmad	8,596	42.03	▲8.23
Total valid votes		20,451	100.00	
Total rejected ballots		286		
Unreturned ballots		0		
Turnout		20,737	74.84	▼4.42
Registered electors		27,710		
Majority		3,259	15.94	▼16.46
PMIP hold		Swing		

Malaysian general election, 1964: Kelantan Hilir
Party	Candidate	Votes	%	∆%
PMIP	Ahmad Abdullah	12,721	66.20	▼7.99
Alliance	Tengku Abdullah Tengku Ahmad	6,496	33.80	▲7.99
Total valid votes		19,217	100.00	
Total rejected ballots		955		
Unreturned ballots		0		
Turnout		20,172	79.26	▲8.85
Registered electors		25,451		
Majority		6,225	32.40	▼38.01
PMIP hold		Swing		

Malayan general election, 1959: Kelantan Hilir
Party	Candidate	Votes	%
PMIP	Wan Mustapha Ali	12,438	74.19
Alliance	Hassan Ya'acob	4,327	25.81
Total valid votes		16,765	100.00
Total rejected ballots		115	
Unreturned ballots		0	
Turnout		16,880	70.41
Registered electors		23,975	
Majority		8,111	48.38
This was a new constituency created.
