= Ahmad Marzuk Shaary =

Malaysian politician

Yang Berhormat Datuk Dr. Ahmad Marzuk Shaary PMW JMK MP
- أحمد مرزوق بن شعاري
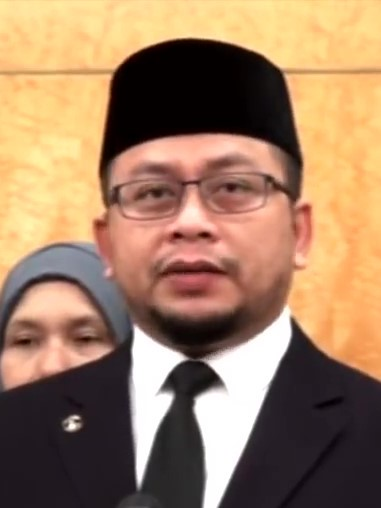
- Ahmad in 2018

Deputy Minister in the Prime Minister's Department (Religious Affairs)
- In office 30 August 2021 – 24 November 2022
- Monarch: Abdullah
- Prime Minister: Ismail Sabri Yaakob
- Minister: Idris Ahmad
- Preceded by: Himself
- Succeeded by: Zulkifli Hasan
- Constituency: Pengkalan Chepa
- In office 10 March 2020 – 16 August 2021
- Monarch: Abdullah
- Prime Minister: Muhyiddin Yassin
- Minister: Zulkifli Mohamad Al-Bakri
- Preceded by: Fuziah Salleh
- Succeeded by: Himself
- Constituency: Pengkalan Chepa

Member of the Malaysian Parliament for Pengkalan Chepa
- Incumbent
- Assumed office 9 May 2018
- Preceded by: Izani Husin (PR–PAS)
- Majority: 13,232 (2018); 38,270 (2022)

Member of the Malaysian Parliament for Bachok
- In office 5 May 2013 – 9 May 2018
- Preceded by: Nasharudin Mat Isa (PR–PAS)
- Succeeded by: Nik Mohamad Abduh Nik Abdul Aziz (PAS)
- Majority: 201 (2013)

Faction represented in Dewan Rakyat
- 2013–2020: Malaysian Islamic Party
- 2020–: Perikatan Nasional

Personal details
- Born: Ahmad Marzuk bin Shaary; 7 December 1975 (age 50) Bachok, Kelantan, Malaysia
- Citizenship: Malaysian
- Party: Malaysian Islamic Party (PAS)
- Other political affiliations: Pakatan Rakyat (PR); Gagasan Sejahtera (GS); Perikatan Nasional (PN)
- Parent: Shaary Awang
- Education: Al al-Bayt University (BA); Universiti Sains Malaysia (MA); University of Malaya (PhD)
- Occupation: Politician

Ahmad Marzuk bin Shaary (Jawi أحمد مرزوق بن شعاري; born 7 December 1975) is a Malaysian politician who has served as the Member of Parliament (MP) for Pengkalan Chepa since May 2018. He served as the Deputy Minister in the Prime Minister's Department in charge of Religious Affairs for the second term in the Barisan Nasional (BN) administration under former Prime Minister Ismail Sabri Yaakob and former Minister Idris Ahmad from August 2021 to the collapse of the BN administration in November 2022 and the first term in the Perikatan Nasional (PN) administration under former Prime Minister Muhyiddin Yassin and former Minister Zulkifli Mohamad Al-Bakri from March 2020 to the collapse of the PN administration in August 2021 as well as the MP for Bachok from May 2013 to May 2018.

== Politics ==
At the party level, Ahmad Marzuk is the PAS Central Working Committee.

He contested for Bachok parliamentary seat in 2013, defeating former deputy minister Awang Adek Hussin with a slim majority. In 2018 General Election, he contested for Pengkalan Chepa parliamentary seat.

In the Malaysian Cabinet 2020, he is appointed Deputy Minister in the Prime Minister's Department of Malaysia (Religious Affairs) by Prime Minister, Muhyiddin Yassin to assist Dr. Zulkifli Mohamad Al-Bakri.

== Election results ==
Parliament of Malaysia
Year	Constituency	Candidate	Votes	Pct	Opponent(s)	Votes	Pct	Ballots cast	Majority	Turnout
2013	P025 Bachok	Ahmad Marzuk Shaary (PAS)	35,419	50.14%	Awang Adek Hussin (UMNO)	35,218	49.86%	71,792	201	88.02%
2018	P020 Pengkalan Chepa	Ahmad Marzuk Shaary (PAS)	32,592	54.88%	Zaluzi Sulaiman (UMNO)	19,360	32.60%	60,862	13,232	80.74%
2018	P020 Pengkalan Chepa	Ahmad Marzuk Shaary (PAS)	32,592	54.88%	Mohamad Ibrahim (AMANAH)	7,435	12.52%	60,862	13,232	80.74%
2022	P020 Pengkalan Chepa	Ahmad Marzuk Shaary (PAS)	53,933	69.36%	Mohd Hafiezulniezam Mohd Hasdin (UMNO)	15,633	20.14%	78,659	38,270	72.69%
2022	P020 Pengkalan Chepa	Ahmad Marzuk Shaary (PAS)	53,933	69.36%	Nik Faizah Nik Othman (AMANAH)	7,356	9.46%	78,659	38,270	72.69%
2022	P020 Pengkalan Chepa	Ahmad Marzuk Shaary (PAS)	53,933	69.36%	Mohamad Redzuan Razali (IND)	451	0.58%	78,659	38,270	72.69%
2022	P020 Pengkalan Chepa	Ahmad Marzuk Shaary (PAS)	53,933	69.36%	Mohamad Redzuan Razali (PEJUANG)	358	0.46%	78,659	38,270	72.69%

== Honours ==
=== Honours of Malaysia ===
- Malaysia
  - Recipient of the 17th Yang di-Pertuan Agong Installation Medal (2024)
- Federal Territory (Malaysia)
  - Commander of the Order of the Territorial Crown (PMW) – Datuk (2021)
- Kelantan
  - Companion of the Order of the Life of the Crown of Kelantan (JMK) (2019)
