= Abdul Halim Abdul Rahman =

Malaysian politician (1939–2022)

Yang Berbahagia Dato' Haji Abdul Halim Abdul Rahman
- عبدالحليم عبدالرحمن

Member of the Malaysian Parliament for Pengkalan Chepa, Kelantan
- In office 21 March 2004 – 5 May 2013
- Preceded by: Nik Mohd. Amar Nik Abdullah
- Succeeded by: Izani Husin
- Majority: 6,222 (2004); 13,111 (2008)

Member of the Kelantan State Legislative Assembly for Banggol
- In office August 1986 – April 1995

Member of the Kelantan State Legislative Assembly for Kijang
- In office April 1995 – March 2004

Deputy Menteri Besar of Kelantan
- In office 1990–2004

Personal details
- Born: 10 November 1939 Kelantan, British Malaya
- Died: 22 August 2022 (aged 82) Kota Bharu, Kelantan, Malaysia
- Party: Malaysian Islamic Party
- Other political affiliations: Perikatan Nasional; Muafakat Nasional; Pakatan Rakyat; Barisan Alternatif
- Occupation: Politician

Haji Abdul Halim bin Abdul Rahman (10 November 1939 – 22 August 2022) was a Malaysian politician who served as the deputy Menteri Besar of Kelantan from 1990 to 2004, a member of the Kelantan State Legislative Assembly (MLA) for Banggol from August 1986 to April 1995 and for Kijang from April 1995 to March 2004 and a member of parliament (MP) for Pengkalan Chepa from March 2004 to May 2013. He was a member and Treasurer of the Malaysian Islamic Party (PAS), a component party of the ruling Perikatan Nasional (PN) and formerly Pakatan Rakyat (PR) opposition coalitions.

== Election results ==
Kelantan State Legislative Assembly
Year	Constituency	Candidate	Votes	Pct	Opponent(s)	Votes	Pct	Ballots cast	Majority	Turnout
1986	N06 Banggol	Abdul Halim Abdul Rahman (PAS)	5,288	57.43%	Ariffin Salleh (UMNO)	3,920	42.57%	9,448	1,368	71.57%
1990	N06 Banggol	Abdul Halim Abdul Rahman (PAS)	8,397	77.74%	Manaf Daud (UMNO)	2,322	21.49%	11,051	6,075	73.34%
1990	N06 Banggol	Abdul Halim Abdul Rahman (PAS)	8,397	77.74%	Ismail Idris (IND)	83	0.77%	11,051	6,075	73.34%
1995	N04 Kijang	Abdul Halim Abdul Rahman (PAS)		%	Wan Mamat Wan Yusoff (UMNO)		%		2,215	%
1999	N04 Kijang	Abdul Halim Abdul Rahman (PAS)		%	Nik Mohd Zain Omar (UMNO)		%		1,829	%
2004	N13 Chetok	Abdul Halim Abdul Rahman (PAS)	6,970	%	Mustafa Taib (UMNO)	6,458	%	13,686	512	
2008	N13 Chetok	Abdul Halim Abdul Rahman (PAS)	9,107	58.59%	Abdul Rahim Abdul Rahman (UMNO)	6,437	41.41%	15,814	2,670	81.87%
2013	N13 Chetok	Abdul Halim Abdul Rahman (PAS)	10,578	55.18%	Aimi Jusoh (UMNO)	8,593	44.82%	19,566	1,985	83.77%

Parliament of Malaysia
Year	Constituency	Candidate	Votes	Pct	Opponent(s)	Votes	Pct	Ballots cast	Majority	Turnout
2004	P020 Pengkalan Chepa	Abdul Halim Abdul Rahman (PAS)	20,621	58.39%	Nik Mohd Zain Omar (UMNO)	14,399	40.77%	36,135	6,222	80.58%
2008	P020 Pengkalan Chepa	Abdul Halim Abdul Rahman (PAS)	26,763	62.99%	Rahim Mohd Zain (UMNO)	15,452	36.37%	43,049	11,311	82.23%
