= Khlir Mohd Nor =

Malaysian politician and former military officer

Yang Berhormat Major General (Rtd) Dato' Khlir Mohd Nor PSAT DSAP DIMP PAT PKK KAT KMN PPS PPA PNBB PJM MP

Member of the Malaysian Parliament for Ketereh
- Incumbent
- Assumed office 19 November 2022
- Preceded by: Annuar Musa (BN–UMNO)
- Majority: 23,107 (2022)

Faction represented in the Dewan Rakyat
- 2022–: Perikatan Nasional

Personal details
- Born: Khlir bin Mohd Nor; 4 July 1958 (age 68) Kampung Kadok, Ketereh, Kota Bharu, Kelantan, Federation of Malaya
- Party: Malaysian United Indigenous Party (BERSATU)
- Other political affiliations: Perikatan Nasional (PN)
- Occupation: Politician
- Profession: Military officer

Military service
- Allegiance: Malaysia
- Branch/service: Malaysian Army
- Rank: Major General
- Khlir Mohd Nor on Facebook

Khlir bin Mohd Nor (born 4 July 1958) is a Malaysian politician and former military officer who has been the Member of Parliament (MP) for Ketereh since November 2022. He is a member of the Malaysian United Indigenous Party (BERSATU), a component party of the Perikatan Nasional (PN) coalition.

== Political career ==
=== Member of Parliament (since 2022) ===
==== 2022 general election ====
In the 2022 general election, Khlir made his electoral debut after being nominated by PN to contest for the Ketereh federal seat. He won the seat and was elected to Parliament as the Ketereh MP after defeating Marzuani Ardilla Ariffin of Barisan Nasional (BN), Rahimi L Muhamud of Pakatan Harapan (PH) and Haneef Ibrahim of Gerakan Tanah Air (GTA) by a majority of 23,107 votes.

==== Rumours of being nominated as the new Leader of the Opposition ====
There were rumours that Khlir was to be nominated as the new Leader of the Opposition to replace Hamzah Zainudin by Chairman of PN Muhyiddin Yassin after a political fallout between Muhyiddin and Hamzah on which direction should BERSATU go to and who the candidate for the Menteri Besar of Selangor in the 2023 Selangor state election is. They were however rubbished by Muhyiddin.

== Election results ==
Parliament of Malaysia
Year	Constituency	Candidate	Votes	Pct	Opponent(s)	Votes	Pct	Ballots cast	Majority	Turnout
2022	P026 Ketereh	Khlir Mohd Nor (BERSATU)	40,542	64.49%	Marzuani Ardilla Ariffin (UMNO)	17,435	27.74%	67,762	23,107	78.22%
2022	P026 Ketereh	Khlir Mohd Nor (BERSATU)	40,542	64.49%	Rahimi L Muhamud (PKR)	4,662	7.42%	67,762	23,107	78.22%
2022	P026 Ketereh	Khlir Mohd Nor (BERSATU)	40,542	64.49%	Haneef Ibrahim (PUTRA)	223	0.35%	67,762	23,107	78.22%

== Honours ==
=== Honours of Malaysia ===
- Malaysia
  - Officer of the Order of the Defender of the Realm (KMN) (2009)
  - Recipient of the Loyal Service Medal (PPS)
  - Recipient of the General Service Medal (PPA)
  - Recipient of the United Nations Missions Service Medal (PNBB) with "IRAQ" clasp
  - Recipient of the 17th Yang di-Pertuan Agong Installation Medal (2024)
- Malaysian Armed Forces
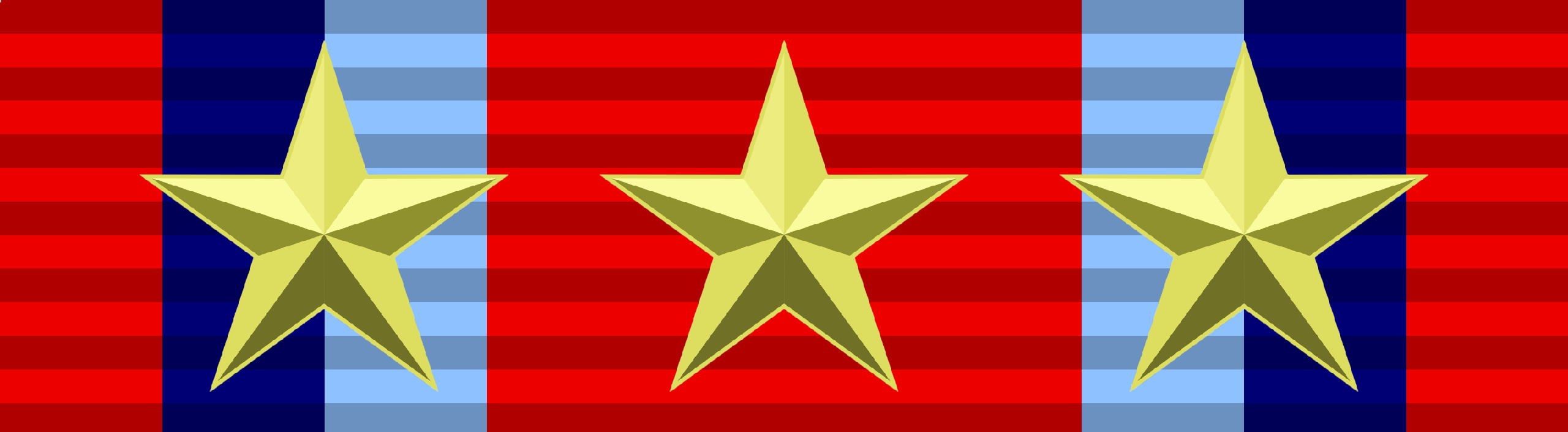
  - Loyal Commander of the Most Gallant Order of Military Service (PSAT) (2012)
  - Warrior of the Most Gallant Order of Military Service (PAT)
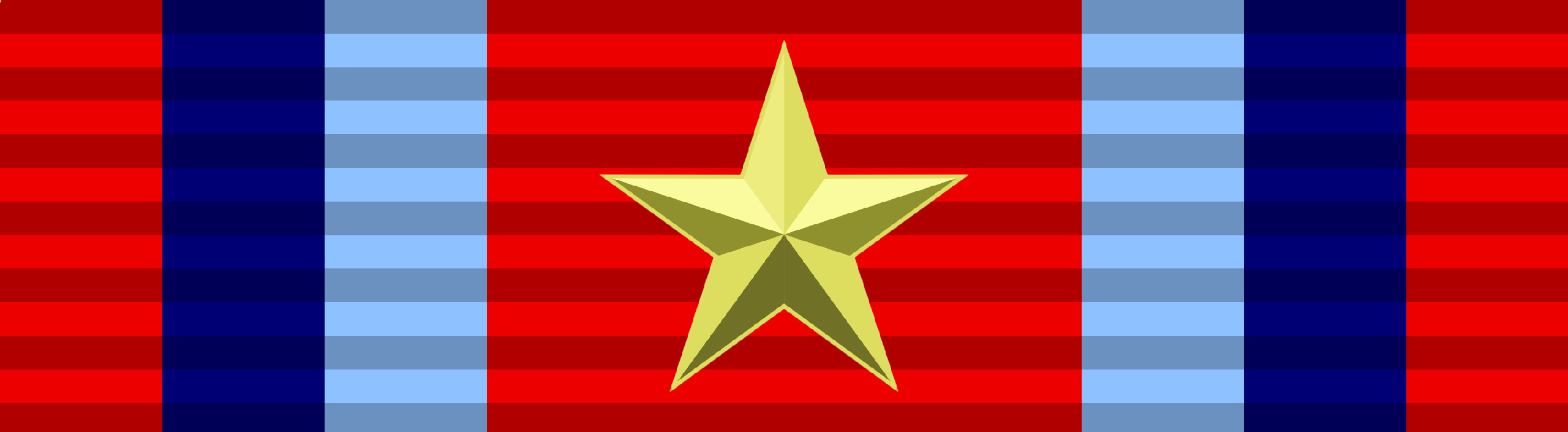
  - Officer of the Most Gallant Order of Military Service (KAT)
  - Recipient of the Malaysian Service Medal (PJM)
- Kelantan
  - Commander of the Order of the Noble Crown of Kelantan (PKK)
- Pahang
  - Knight Companion of the Order of Sultan Ahmad Shah of Pahang (DSAP) – Dato' (2015)
  - Knight Companion of the Order of the Crown of Pahang (DIMP) – Dato' (2009)

=== Foreign honours ===
- United Nations
  - Recipient of the UNIIMOG Medal

== See also ==
- Ketereh (federal constituency)
- Malaysian United Indigenous Party
- Perikatan Nasional
- 2022 Malaysian general election
