= Izani Husin =

Malaysian politician (born 1963)

Yang Berhormat Dato' Izani Husin DJMK JMK MLA
- عزاني حسين

Member of the Kelantan State Executive Council
- Incumbent
- Assumed office 15 August 2023
- Monarch: Muhammad V
- Menteri Besar: Mohd Nassuruddin Daud
- Portfolio: Public Works, Infrastructure, Water and Rural Development
- Preceded by: Azami Md. Nor (Public Works, Infrastructure); Portfolio established (Water and Rural Development)
- Constituency: Kijang
- In office 17 May 2018 – 15 August 2023
- Monarch: Muhammad V
- Menteri Besar: Ahmad Yaakob
- Portfolio: Local Government, Housing and Health
- Succeeded by: Hilmi Abdullah (Local Government, Housing and Health)
- Constituency: Kijang

Member of the Kelantan State Legislative Assembly for Kijang
- Incumbent
- Assumed office 9 May 2018
- Preceded by: Wan Ubaidah Omar (PAS)
- Majority: 4,717 (2018); 9,908 (2023)

Faction represented in Dewan Rakyat
- 2013–2018: Malaysian Islamic Party

Faction represented in Kelantan State Legislative Assembly
- 2018–2020: Malaysian Islamic Party
- 2020–: Perikatan Nasional

Personal details
- Born: Izani bin Husin; 24 January 1963 (age 63) Pengkalan Chepa, Kota Bahru, Kelantan, Federation of Malaya (now Malaysia)
- Party: Malaysian Islamic Party (PAS)
- Other political affiliations: Pakatan Rakyat (PR) (until 2015); Perikatan Nasional (PN) (since 2020)
- Education: Universiti Kebangsaan Malaysia (MD)
- Occupation: Politician
- Profession: Physician

Izani bin Husin (born 24 January 1963) is a Malaysian politician and physician who has served as Member of the Kelantan State Executive Council (EXCO) under former Menteri Besar, Ahmad Yakob and the current Menteri Besar, Mohd Nassuruddin Daud. He has served as the Member of the Kelantan State Legislative Assembly (MLA) for Kijang since May 2018. He is a member of the Malaysian Islamic Party (PAS), a component party of the ruling Perikatan Nasional (PN) coalition.

His private clinic, Klinik Al-Ikhtiar-Ir is located at Jalan Guchil Bayam, Kubang Kerian, Kelantan.

He obtained Doctor of Medicine degree at UKM in 1990.

== Election results ==
Parliament of Malaysia
Year	Constituency	Candidate	Votes	Pct	Opponent(s)	Votes	Pct	Ballots cast	Majority	Turnout
2013	P020 Pengkalan Chepa	Izani Husin (PAS)	34,617	63.97%	Dali Husin (UMNO)	19,497	36.03%	54,985	15,120	85.37%

Kelantan State Legislative Assembly
Year	Constituency	Candidate	Votes	Pct	Opponent(s)	Votes	Pct	Ballots cast	Majority	Turnout
2018	N05 Kijang	Izani Husin (PAS)	9,998	58.44%	Wan Shahrul Azuan Wan Ab Aziz (UMNO)	5,281	30.87%	20,796	4,717	79.1%
2018	N05 Kijang	Izani Husin (PAS)	9,998	58.44%	Nik Azmi Nik Man @ Nik Osman (PKR)	1,828	10.69%	20,796	4,717	79.1%
2023	N05 Kijang	Izani Husin (PAS)	14,552	75.81%	Haris Hussin (UMNO)	4,644	24.19%	19,342	9,908	63.68%

== Honours ==
- Kelantan
  - Knight Commander of the Order of the Life of the Crown of Kelantan (DJMK) – Dato' (2022)
  - Companion of the Order of the Life of the Crown of Kelantan (JMK) (2018)
