= Kadok, Daik-U Township =

Kadok ကတုတ်
- Village
- Location in Burma
- Coordinates: 17°41′N 96°35′E
- Country: Burma
- Region: Bago Region
- District: Bago
- Township: Daik-U
- Time zone: UTC+6.30 (MST)

Kadok is a village in Daik-U Township, Bago District, in the Bago Region of southern Burma.

== Notes ==
လဘလလ
