= Kijang (state constituency) =

Electoral district in Kelantan, Malaysia

Kijang (N05)
Kelantan constituency

State constituency
- Legislature: Kelantan State Legislative Assembly
MLA
Izani Husin
PN
- Constituency created: 1994
- First contested: 1995
- Last contested: 2023

Demographics
- Population (2020): 34,503
- Electors (2023): 30,405

Kijang is a state constituency in Kelantan, Malaysia, that has been represented in the Kelantan State Legislative Assembly.

The state constituency was first contested in 1995 and is mandated to return a single Assemblyman to the Kelantan State Legislative Assembly under the first-past-the-post voting system.

== Demographics ==
As of 2020, Kijang has a population of 34,503 people.

Ethnic breakdown of Kijang's electorate as of 2023
1. Malay (95.3%)
2. Chinese (2.53%)
3. Other ethnicities (2.11%)
4. Indian (0.07%)

== History ==
=== Polling districts ===
According to the Gazette issued on 30 March 2018, the Kijang constituency has a total of 9 polling districts.

State Constituency	Polling Districts	Code	Location
Kijang (N05)	Pulau Pisang	020/05/01	SK Che Latiff
Kijang (N05)	Pulau Kundor	020/05/02	SK Pulau Kundor
Kijang (N05)	Semut Api	020/05/03	SK Semut Api
Kijang (N05)	Kedai Buloh	020/05/04	SMK Kedai Buloh
Kijang (N05)	Kijang	020/05/05	SK Kedai Buloh 1
Kijang (N05)	Banggol	020/05/06	SK Abdul Hadi
Kijang (N05)	Tikat	020/05/07	SK Redang
Kijang (N05)	Kampung Penambang	020/05/08	SMK Penambang
Kijang (N05)	Kampung China	020/05/09	SK Penambang

=== Representation history ===
Members of the Legislative Assembly for Kijang
Assembly	No	Years	Member	Party
Constituency created from Banggol
9th	N04	1995–1999	Abdul Halim Abdul Rahman	PAS
10th	N04	1999–2004	Abdul Halim Abdul Rahman	PAS
11th	N05	2004–2008	Husam Musa	PAS
12th	N05	2008–2013	Wan Ubaidah Omar	PR (PAS)
13th	N05	2013–2018	Wan Ubaidah Omar	PR (PAS)
14th	N05	2018–2020	Izani Husin	PAS
14th	N05	2020–2023	Izani Husin	PN (PAS)
15th	N05	2023–present	Izani Husin	PN (PAS)

== Election results ==
Kelantan state election, 2023
Party	Candidate	Votes	%	∆%
PAS	Izani Husin	14,552	75.81	▲17.37
BN	Haris Hussin	4,644	24.19	▼6.68
Total valid votes		19,196	100.00	
Total rejected ballots		146		
Unreturned ballots		21		
Turnout		19,363	63.68	▼15.41
Registered electors		30,405		
Majority		9,908	51.62	▲24.05
PAS hold		Swing		

Kelantan state election, 2018
Party	Candidate	Votes	%	∆%
PAS	Izani Husin	14,552	58.44	▼7.51
BN	Wan Shahrul Azuan Wan Ab Aziz	4,644	30.87	▼3.18
PKR	Nik Azmi Nik Osman	1,828	10.69	▲10.69
Total valid votes		17,107	100.00	
Total rejected ballots		222		
Unreturned ballots		207		
Turnout		17,536	79.09	▼5.68
Registered electors		22,173		
Majority		9,908	27.57	▼4.33
PAS hold		Swing		

Kelantan state election, 2013
Party	Candidate	Votes	%
PAS	Wan Ubaidah Omar	10,632	65.95
BN	Zaluzi Sulaiman	5,489	34.05
Total valid votes		16,121	100.00
Total rejected ballots		204	
Unreturned ballots		60	
Turnout		16,385	84.77
Registered electors		19,329	
Majority		5,143	31.90
PAS hold		Swing	

Kelantan state election, 2008
Party	Candidate	Votes	%	∆%
On Nomination Day, Wan Ubaidah Omar won uncontested.
PAS	Wan Ubaidah Omar			
Total valid votes			100.00	
Total rejected ballots				
Unreturned ballots				
Turnout				
Registered electors		16,265		
Majority				
PAS hold		Swing		

Kelantan state election, 2004
Party	Candidate	Votes	%	∆%
PAS	Husam Musa	6,916	63.16	▼11.16
BN	Che Rosli Hassan	4,034	36.84	▲11.16
Total valid votes		10,950	100.00	
Total rejected ballots		146		
Unreturned ballots		30		
Turnout		11,126	79.35	▲3.59
Registered electors		14,022		
Majority		2,882	26.32	▼22.33
PAS hold		Swing		

Kelantan state election, 1999
Party	Candidate	Votes	%	∆%
PAS	Abdul Halim Abdul Rahman	7,352	74.32	▲1.45
BN	Che Mansor Adabi Che Hassan	2,540	25.68	▼1.45
Total valid votes		9,892	100.00	
Total rejected ballots		256		
Unreturned ballots		9		
Turnout		10,157	75.75	▲1.56
Registered electors		13,408		
Majority		4,812	48.65	▲2.91
PAS hold		Swing		

Kelantan state election, 1995
Party	Candidate	Votes	%
PAS	Abdul Halim Abdul Rahman	6,865	72.87
BN	Ropli Ishak	2,556	27.13
Total valid votes		9,421	100.00
Total rejected ballots		190	
Unreturned ballots		29	
Turnout		9,640	74.19
Registered electors		12,993	
Majority		4,309	45.74
This was a new constituency created.
