= Melor (state constituency) =

State constituency

Melor (N23)
Kelantan constituency

State constituency
- Legislature: Kelantan State Legislative Assembly
MLA
Wan Rohimi Wan Daud
PN
- Constituency created: 1994
- First contested: 1995
- Last contested: 2023

Demographics
- Electors (2023): 28,387

Melor is a state constituency in Kelantan, Malaysia, that has been represented in the Kelantan State Legislative Assembly.

The state constituency was first contested in 1995 and is mandated to return a single Assemblyman to the Kelantan State Legislative Assembly under the first-past-the-post voting system.

== Demographics ==
As of 2020, Melor has a population of 33,538 people.

Ethnic breakdown of Melor's electorate as of 2023
1. Malay (97.2%)
2. Chinese (1.56%)
3. Other ethnicities (1.16%)
4. Indian (0.07%)

== History ==
=== Polling districts ===
According to the Gazette issued on 30 March 2018, the Melor constituency has a total of 9 polling districts.

State Constituency	Polling Districts	Code	Location
Melor (N23)	Peringat	026/23/01	SK Peringat
Melor (N23)	Badak Mati	026/23/02	SK Padang Mokan
Melor (N23)	Bechah Keranji	026/23/03	SK Bechah Keranji
Melor (N23)	Padang Kala	026/23/04	SK Padang Kala
Melor (N23)	Padang Raja	026/23/05	SMA Melor
Melor (N23)	Melor	026/23/06	SMK Melor
Melor (N23)	Melor Lama	026/23/07	SK Sri Melor
Melor (N23)	Tegayong	026/23/08	SK Tegayong
Melor (N23)	Pangkal Pisang	026/23/09	SK Raja Abdullah

=== Representation history ===
Members of the Legislative Assembly for Melor
Assembly	No	Years	Member	Party
Constituency created from Ketereh
9th	N22	1995–1999	Zainal Abidin Ab. Kadir	BN (UMNO)
10th	N22	1999–2004	Wan Ismail Wan Jusoh	BA (PAS)
11th	N23	2004–2008	Azmi Ishak	BN (UMNO)
12th	N23	2008–2013	Wan Ismail Wan Jusoh	PR (PAS)
13th	N23	2013–2015	Md Yusnan Yusof	PR (PAS)
13th	N23	2015–2016	Md Yusnan Yusof	PAS
13th	N23	2016–2018	Md Yusnan Yusof	GS (PAS)
14th	N23	2018–2020	Md Yusnan Yusof	GS (PAS)
14th	N23	2020–2021	Md Yusnan Yusof	PN (PAS)
14th	N23	2021–2023	Vacant (Note: Vacant from 30 April 2021 until the 2023 state election due to the incumbent died in office. No by-election was held due to the emergency order declared in January in order to curb the COVID-19 pandemic.)	
15th	N23	2023–present	Wan Rohimi Wan Daud	PN (PAS)

== Election results ==
Kelantan state election, 2023
Party	Candidate	Votes	%	∆%
PAS	Wan Rohimi Wan Daud	12,688	70.13	▲24.44
BN	Azmi Ishak	5,405	29.87	▼12.04
Total valid votes		18,093	100.00	
Total rejected ballots		127		
Unreturned ballots		26		
Turnout		18,246	64.28	▼18.52
Registered electors		28,387		
Majority		7,283	40.26	▲36.48
PAS hold		Swing		

Kelantan state election, 2018
Party	Candidate	Votes	%	∆%
PAS	Md Yusnan Yusof	7,820	45.69	▼10.97
BN	Azmi Ishak	7,173	41.91	▼1.43
PKR	Ab Aziz Ab Kadir	2,122	12.40	▲12.40
Total valid votes		17,115	100.00	
Total rejected ballots		335		
Unreturned ballots		136		
Turnout		17,586	82.80	▼3.30
Registered electors		21,240		
Majority		647	3.78	▼9.54
PAS hold		Swing		

Kelantan state election, 2013
Party	Candidate	Votes	%	∆%
PAS	Md Yusnan Yusof	10,590	56.66	▲1.33
BN	Mohd Othman Omar	8,101	43.34	▼1.33
Total valid votes		18,691	100.00	
Total rejected ballots		272		
Unreturned ballots		51		
Turnout		19,014	86.10	▲3.31
Registered electors		22,094		
Majority		2,489	13.32	▲2.66
PAS hold		Swing		

Kelantan state election, 2008
Party	Candidate	Votes	%	∆%
PAS	Wan Ismail Wan Jusoh	8,390	55.33	▲6.12
BN	Radzuan Hamat	6,774	44.67	▼6.12
Total valid votes		15,164	100.00	
Total rejected ballots		213		
Unreturned ballots		28		
Turnout		15,405	82.79	▲2.11
Registered electors		18,607		
Majority		1,616	10.66	▲9.08
PAS gain from BN		Swing		?

Kelantan state election, 2004
Party	Candidate	Votes	%	∆%
BN	Azmi Ishak	6,775	50.79	▲9.89
PAS	Wan Ismail Wan Jusoh	6,563	49.21	▼9.89
Total valid votes		13,338	100.00	
Total rejected ballots		182		
Unreturned ballots		26		
Turnout		13,546	80.68	▲2.84
Registered electors		16,789		
Majority		212	1.58	▼16.62
BN gain from PAS		Swing		?

Kelantan state election, 1999
Party	Candidate	Votes	%	∆%
PAS	Wan Ismail Wan Jusoh	6,847	59.10	▲59.10
BN	Zainal Abidin Ab. Kadir	4,738	40.90	▼10.13
Total valid votes		11,585	100.00	
Total rejected ballots		215		
Unreturned ballots		13		
Turnout		11,813	77.84	▲1.43
Registered electors		15,176		
Majority		2,109	18.20	▲15.12
PAS gain from BN		Swing		?

Kelantan state election, 1995
Party	Candidate	Votes	%
BN	Zainal Abidin Ab. Kadir	5,486	51.03
S46	Khairuldden Mat Adam	5,155	47.95
KITA	Tuan Mohamad Tuan Soh	110	1.02
Total valid votes		10,751	100.00
Total rejected ballots		234	
Unreturned ballots		22	
Turnout		11,007	76.41
Registered electors		14,405	
Majority		331	3.08
This was a new constituency created.
