= Ketereh =

Town in Kelantan

Coordinates: 5°57′N 102°15′E

- Town
- Interactive map of Ketereh
- Kota Bharu in Kelantan Ketereh (Malaysia) Ketereh (Southeast Asia) Ketereh (Asia)
- Country: Malaysia
- State: Kelantan
- District: Kota Bharu District

Government
  - Type: Municipal council
  - Body: Ketereh District Council
- Time zone: UTC+8 (MST)
  - Summer (DST): Not observed
- Postcode: 15xxx
- Area code: +60-09-7
- Website: mdketereh.kelantan.gov.my

Ketereh District Council Majlis Daerah Keteren

Type
- Type: Local authority of Ketereh

History
- Founded: 1 January 1979

Leadership
- President: YABrs.Tuan Haji Rusydee Bin Abdullah
- District secretary: YBrs En. Mohd Azman Bin Ghazali

Motto
- Bersatu Membangun Masyarakat (Develop The Society Together)

Meeting place
- KM 19, Jalan Kuala Krai, 16450 Kota Bharu, Kelantan Darul Naim.

Website
- mdketereh.kelantan.gov.my

Ketereh is a town and parliamentary constituency in Kelantan. It is located in the southern half of Kota Bharu District, roughly halfway between metropolitan Kota Bharu and Machang along Highway 8. The town was named after the local name for the cashew fruit, ketereh (gajus in standard Malay).

== Transportation ==
=== Rail ===
KTM Intercity does not stop in Ketereh town. The nearest station is in Pasir Mas.

== Government and politics ==
Ketereh is administered by the Ketereh District Council (Malay: Majlis Daerah Ketereh), which was established on 1 January 1979 as the Kota Bharu District Council (Malay: Majlis Daerah Kota Bharu), through the merger of the Kadok, Pangkal Kalong and Peringat Local Councils.

In the Malaysian Parliament Ketereh is represented by Khlir Mohd Nor.

== See also ==
- Kota Bharu
