= Chempaka (Kelantan state constituency) =

State constituency in Kelantan, Malaysia

Chempaka (N06)
Kelantan constituency

State constituency
- Legislature: Kelantan State Legislative Assembly
MLA
Nik Asma' Bahrum Nik Abdullah
PN
- Constituency created: 1994
- First contested: 1995
- Last contested: 2023

Demographics
- Electors (2023): 34,641

Chempaka is a state constituency in Kelantan, Malaysia, that has been represented in the Kelantan State Legislative Assembly.

The state constituency was first contested in 1995 and is mandated to return a single Assemblyman to the Kelantan State Legislative Assembly under the first-past-the-post voting system.

== Demographics ==
As of 2020, Chempaka has a population of 49,231 people.

Ethnic breakdown of Chempaka's electorate as of 2023
1. Malay (98.6%)
2. Chinese (0.76%)
3. Other ethnicities (0.57%)
4. Indian (0.06%)

== History ==
=== Polling districts ===
According to the Gazette issued on 30 March 2018, the Chempaka constituency has a total of 11 polling districts.

State Constituency	Polling Districts	Code	Location
Chempaka (N06)	Sabak	020/06/01	SK Sabak
Chempaka (N06)	Tebing Tinggi	020/06/02	SK Parang Puting
Chempaka (N06)	Telok Kitang	020/06/03	SK Parang Puting
Chempaka (N06)	Kampung Pulau Panjang	020/06/04	SK Kem
Chempaka (N06)	Tanjong Bahru	020/06/05	SMK Badang
Chempaka (N06)	Che Deris	020/06/06	SK Che Deris
Chempaka (N06)	Baung	020/06/07	SMK Pengkalan Chepa
Chempaka (N06)	Pengkalan Nangka	020/06/08	SMA Tengku Amalin A'ishah Putri
Chempaka (N06)	Chempaka	020/06/09	SK Seri Chempaka
Chempaka (N06)	Simpang Tiga Pengkalan Chepa	020/06/10	Kolej Vokesional Pengkalan Chepa
Chempaka (N06)	Pulau Gajah	020/06/11	SK Pulau Gajah

=== Representation history ===
Members of the Legislative Assembly for Chempaka
Assembly	No	Years	Member	Party
Constituency created from Semut Api
9th	N05	1995–1999	Nik Abdul Aziz Nik Mat	PAS
10th	N05	1999–2004	Nik Abdul Aziz Nik Mat	PAS
11th	N06	2004–2008	Nik Abdul Aziz Nik Mat	PAS
12th	N06	2008–2013	Nik Abdul Aziz Nik Mat	PR (PAS)
13th	N06	2013–2015	Nik Abdul Aziz Nik Mat	PR (PAS)
13th	N06	2015–2018	Ahmad Fathan Mahmood	PR (PAS)
14th	N06	2018–2020	Ahmad Fathan Mahmood	PAS
14th	N06	2020–2023	Ahmad Fathan Mahmood	PN (PAS)
15th	N06	2023–present	Nik Asma' Bahrum Nik Abdullah	PN (PAS)

== Election results ==
Kelantan state election, 2023
Party	Candidate	Votes	%	∆%
PAS	Nik Asma' Bahrum Nik Abdullah	16,728	74.46	▲21.83
BN	Nik Normi Nik Ayub	5,504	24.50	▼10.80
Independent	Ibrahim Sulong	234	1.04	▲1.04
Total valid votes		22,466	100.00	
Total rejected ballots		197		
Unreturned ballots		28		
Turnout		22,691	65.50	▼17.46
Registered electors		34,641		
Majority		11,224	49.96	▲32.63
PAS hold		Swing		

Kelantan state election, 2018
Party	Candidate	Votes	%	∆%
PAS	Ahmad Fathan Mahamad	10,549	52.63	▼39.17
BN	Mohamad Fareez Nor Amran	7,075	35.30	▲35.30
PKR	Nik Omar Nik Ab Aziz	2,418	12.06	▲12.06
Total valid votes		20,042	100.00	
Total rejected ballots		232		
Unreturned ballots		219		
Turnout		20,493	82.96	▲28.05
Registered electors		24,702		
Majority		3,474	17.33	▼67.67
PAS hold		Swing		

Kelantan state by-election, 22 March 2015 The by-election was called due to the death of incumbent, Nik Abdul Aziz Nik Mat.
Party	Candidate	Votes	%	∆%
PAS	Ahmad Fathan Mahmood	10,899	91.80	▲39.17
Independent	Sharif Mahmood	807	6.80	▲6.80
Independent	Fadzillah Hussin	89	0.75	▲0.75
Independent	Izat Bukhary Ismail Bukhary	51	0.43	▲0.43
Independent	Aslah Mamat	27	0.23	▲0.23
Total valid votes		11,873	100.00	
Total rejected ballots		140		
Unreturned ballots		7		
Turnout		12,020	54.91	▼31.26
Registered electors		21,890		
Majority		10,092	85.00	▲49.12
PAS hold		Swing		
Source(s) "Pilihan Raya Kecil N.06 Chempaka". Election Commission of Malaysia. Archived from the original on 2018-09-19. "Federal Government Gazette - Notice of Contested Election - By-election of the State Legislative Assembly of N.06 Chempaka for the State of Kelantan [P.U. (B) 88/2015]" (PDF). Attorney General's Chambers of Malaysia. 10 March 2015. "Federal Government Gazette - Results of Contested Election and Statement of the Poll after the Official Addition of Votes for the By-election of N.06 Chempaka [P.U. (B) 150/2015]" (PDF). Attorney General's Chambers of Malaysia. 2 April 2015. Archived from the original (PDF) on 2019-12-28.

Kelantan state election, 2013
Party	Candidate	Votes	%	∆%
PAS	Nik Abdul Aziz Nik Mat	12,310	67.94	▲3.56
BN	Wan Razman Wan Ab. Razak	5,810	32.06	▼3.56
Total valid votes		18,120	100.00	
Total rejected ballots		237		
Unreturned ballots		56		
Turnout		18,413	86.17	▲1.55
Registered electors		21,364		
Majority		6,500	35.88	▲7.12
PAS hold		Swing		

Kelantan state election, 2008
Party	Candidate	Votes	%	∆%
PAS	Nik Abdul Aziz Nik Mat	9,514	64.38	▼0.72
BN	Nik Mohd Zain Omar	5,265	35.62	▲0.72
Total valid votes		12,084	100.00	
Total rejected ballots		288		
Unreturned ballots		35		
Turnout		12,407	81.47	▲3.21
Registered electors		15,229		
Majority		3,694	30.57	▼27.39
PAS hold		Swing		

Kelantan state election, 2004
Party	Candidate	Votes	%	∆%
PAS	Nik Abdul Aziz Nik Mat	7,889	65.10	▼7.70
BN	Ruhani Mamat	4,195	34.90	▲7.70
Total valid votes		10,951	100.00	
Total rejected ballots		189		
Unreturned ballots		661		
Turnout		11,801	78.26	▼1.27
Registered electors		15,080		
Majority		6,347	57.96	▲12.37
PAS hold		Swing		

Kelantan state election, 1999
Party	Candidate	Votes	%	∆%
PAS	Nik Abdul Aziz Nik Mat	7,851	72.80	▼6.30
BN	Ropli Ishak	2,734	27.20	▲6.30
Total valid votes		10,785	100.00	
Total rejected ballots		628		
Unreturned ballots		729		
Turnout		12,142	79.53	▲3.30
Registered electors		15,268		
Majority		4,917	45.59	▼12.61
PAS hold		Swing		

Kelantan state election, 1995
Party	Candidate	Votes	%
PAS	Nik Abdul Aziz Nik Mat	9,504	79.10
BN	Yusof Isa	2,511	20.90
Total valid votes		12,015	100.00
Total rejected ballots		326	
Unreturned ballots		0	
Turnout		12,341	76.22
Registered electors		16,191	
Majority		6,993	58.20
This was a new constituency created.
