= Kok Lanas (state constituency) =

Electoral district in Kelantan, Malaysia

Kok Lanas (N25)
Kelantan constituency

State constituency
- Legislature: Kelantan State Legislative Assembly
MLA
Mohamed Farid Mohamed Zawawi
PN
- Constituency created: 2003
- First contested: 2004
- Last contested: 2023

Demographics
- Electors (2023): 35,679

Kok Lanas is a state constituency in Kelantan, Malaysia, that has been represented in the Kelantan State Legislative Assembly.

The state constituency was first contested in 2004 and is mandated to return a single Assemblyman to the Kelantan State Legislative Assembly under the first-past-the-post voting system.

== Demographics ==
As of 2020, Kok Lanas has a population of 49,571 people.

Ethnic breakdown of Kok Lanas's electorate as of 2023
1. Malay (95.3%)
2. Chinese (2.47%)
3. Other ethnicities (2.06%)
4. Indian (0.01%)

== History ==
=== Polling districts ===
According to the Gazette issued on 30 March 2018, the Kok Lanas constituency has a total of 11 polling districts.

State Constituency	Polling Districts	Code	Location
Kok Lanas (N25)	Kampung Gondang	026/25/01	SK Gondang
Kok Lanas (N25)	Padang Tengah	026/25/02	SMU (A) Ittihadiah Tanjung Pagar
Kok Lanas (N25)	Ketereh	026/25/03	SK Seri Ketereh
Kok Lanas (N25)	Padang Lembek	026/25/04	SK Ketereh
Kok Lanas (N25)	Hutan Pasir	026/25/05	SMK Ketereh
Kok Lanas (N25)	Kampung Guntong	026/25/06	SMK Kok Lanas
Kok Lanas (N25)	Pangkal Kalong	026/25/07	SK Pangkal Kalong
Kok Lanas (N25)	Kedai Kok Lanas	026/25/08	SK Kok Lanas
Kok Lanas (N25)	Setek	026/25/09	SM Persendirian Cina Chung Hwa
Kok Lanas (N25)	Kampung Batu Tinggi	026/25/10	SK Banggol Saman
Kok Lanas (N25)	Kampung Sokor	026/25/11	SK Desa Pahlawan

=== Representation history ===
Members of the Legislative Assembly for Kok Lanas
Assembly	No	Years	Member	Party
Constituency created from Ketereh
11th	N25	2004–2008	Annuar Musa	BN (UMNO)
12th	N25	2008–2013	Md Alwi Che Ahmad	BN (UMNO)
13th	N25	2013–2018	Md Alwi Che Ahmad	BN (UMNO)
14th	N25	2018–2023	Md Alwi Che Ahmad	BN (UMNO)
15th	N25	2023–2026	Mohamed Farid Mohamed Zawawi	PN (BERSATU)
15th	N25	2026	Mohamed Farid Mohamed Zawawi	Independent
15th	N25	2026–present	Mohamed Farid Mohamed Zawawi	PN (WAWASAN)

== Election results ==
Kelantan state election, 2023
Party	Candidate	Votes	%	∆%
PAS	Mohamed Farid Mohamed Zawawi	15,478	68.07	▲24.52
BN	Ahmad Deraman	7,259	31.93	▼16.61
Total valid votes		22,737	100.00	
Total rejected ballots		645		
Unreturned ballots		37		
Turnout		23,419	65.64	▼18.36
Registered electors		35,679		
Majority		8,219	36.14	▲31.15
PAS gain from BN		Swing		?

Kelantan state election, 2018
Party	Candidate	Votes	%	∆%
BN	Md Alwi Che Ahmad	10,921	48.54	▼1.88
PAS	Nik Mahadi Nik Mahmood	9,799	43.55	▼6.03
PKR	Mohd Hanapi Ismail	1,779	7.91	▲7.91
Total valid votes		22,499	100.00	
Total rejected ballots		318		
Unreturned ballots		212		
Turnout		23,029	84.00	▼3.70
Registered electors		27,415		
Majority		1,122	4.99	▲4.15
BN hold		Swing		

Kelantan state election, 2013
Party	Candidate	Votes	%	∆%
BN	Md Alwi Che Ahmad	10,040	50.42	▼1.39
PAS	Nik Mahadi Mahmood	9,871	49.58	▲1.39
Total valid votes		19,911	100.00	
Total rejected ballots		198		
Unreturned ballots		70		
Turnout		20,185	87.70	▲0.96
Registered electors		23,016		
Majority		169	0.84	▼2.78
BN hold		Swing		

Kelantan state election, 2008
Party	Candidate	Votes	%	∆%
BN	Md Alwi Che Ahmad	8,319	51.81	▼8.23
PAS	Ahmad Rusli Iberahim	7,739	48.19	▲8.23
Total valid votes		16,058	100.00	
Total rejected ballots		340		
Unreturned ballots		254		
Turnout		16,651	86.74	▲1.58
Registered electors		19,197		
Majority		580	3.62	▼16.46
BN hold		Swing		

Kelantan state election, 2004
Party	Candidate	Votes	%
BN	Annuar Musa	8,509	60.04
PAS	Mokhtar Salleh	5,663	39.96
Total valid votes		14,172	100.00
Total rejected ballots		318	
Unreturned ballots		217	
Turnout		14,706	85.16
Registered electors		17,269	
Majority		2,846	20.08
This was a new constituency created.
