= Malaysia Federal Route 3150 =

Road in Malaysia

Federal Route 3150
- Jalan Lahat–Simpang Pulai

Route information
- Maintained by Malaysian Public Works Department
- Length: 9.8 km (6.1 mi)

Major junctions
- West end: Lahat
- FT 3151 Federal Route 3151; A184 Jalan Pasir Puteh; A117 State Route A117; FT 1 Federal Route 1 FT 185 Second East–West Highway
- East end: Simpang Pulai

Location
- Country: Malaysia
- Primary destinations: Pasir Pinji

Highway system
- Highways in Malaysia; Expressways; Federal; State

Federal Route 3150, Jalan Lahat–Simpang Pulai, (formerly Perak State Route A106), is an industrial federal road in Ipoh, Perak, Malaysia.

The Kilometre Zero is located at Simpang Pulai.

At most sections, the Federal Route 3150 was built under the JKR R5 road standard, with a speed limit of 90 km/h (56 mph).

== Junction lists ==
The entire route is located in Kinta District, Perak.

Legend:

- I/C - Interchange, I/S - Intersection, RSA - Rest and service area, OBR - Overhead bridge restaurant, R/R - Restaurant and rest plaza, L/B - Layby, V/P - Vista point, TN - tunnel, T/P - Toll plaza, BR - Bridge
- C - Cloverleaf, S - Stack, T-A - Trumpet-A, T-B - Trumpet-B, DT - Directional-T/Y, SDT - Semi-Directional-T/Y, P-Y - Partial-Y, D - Diamond, P-C - Partial cloverleaf, D-D - Diverging diamond, D-R - Direct ramp

Location	km	mi	Name	Destinations	Notes
Lahat			Lahat; Lahat Mines I/S	FT 3151 Jalan Pasir Puteh – Lahat, Mengelembu, Lumut, Papan, Parit, Ipoh; Persiaran Lahat Mines – Lahat Mines	4-way intersections
Lahat			Lahat; Station 18 I/S	Medan Stesen 18 – Station 18; A184 Jalan Pasir Puteh – Pasir Puteh, Ipoh	4-way intersections
Lahat			Taman Seri Megah		
Lahat			Pengkalan Pegoh		
Pasir Pinji			Sungai Pinji bridge		
Pasir Pinji			Taman Pinji Perdana		
Pasir Pinji			Kampung Changkat Larang		
Pasir Pinji			Pasir Pinji; Pasir Pinji I/S	A117 Jalan Pasir Pinji – Batu Gajah	3-way intersections
Simpang Pulai			Seri Botani	Seri Botani Utama – Seri Botani	3-way intersections
Simpang Pulai			Kampung Meranti 8		
Simpang Pulai			Taman Muda		
Simpang Pulai			Kepayang		
Simpang Pulai	0.0	0.0	Simpang Pulai; Simpang Pulai I/S	FT 1 Malaysia Federal Route 1 – Ipoh, Batu Gajah, Gopeng; FT 185 Second East–West Highway – Cameron Highlands, Lojing, Gua Musang, Kuala Terengganu; North–South Expressway Northern Route / AH2 – Alor Setar, Penang, Kuala Lumpur	4-way intersections
1.000 mi = 1.609 km; 1.000 km = 0.621 mi
