= Kelantan State Route D29 =

Road in Malaysia

Kelantan Route 29
- Jalan Dabong–Gua Musang

Major junctions
- North end: Dabong
- FT 66 Federal Route 66; FT 185 Second East–West Highway; FT 8 Federal Route 8
- South end: Gua Musang

Location
- Country: Malaysia
- Primary destinations: Jeli

Highway system
- Highways in Malaysia; Expressways; Federal; State

Kelantan State Route D29, Jalan Dabong–Gua Musang is a major road in Kelantan, Malaysia. The road connects Dabong in the north to Gua Musang in the south. It is a longest state road in Kelantan.

== Junction lists ==
The entire route is located in Kelantan.

Legend:

- I/C - Interchange, I/S - Intersection, RSA - Rest and service area, OBR - Overhead bridge restaurant, R/R - Restaurant and rest plaza, L/B - Layby, V/P - Vista point, TN - tunnel, T/P - Toll plaza, BR - Bridge
- C - Cloverleaf, S - Stack, T-A - Trumpet-A, T-B - Trumpet-B, DT - Directional-T/Y, SDT - Semi-Directional-T/Y, P-Y - Partial-Y, D - Diamond, P-C - Partial cloverleaf, D-D - Diverging diamond, D-R - Direct ramp

District	Location	km	mi	Destinations	Notes
Kuala Krai	Dabong			FT 66 Malaysia Federal Route 66 – Jeli, Dabong town centre	T-junctions
Gua Musang	Gua Musang			Sungai Nenggiri bridge	
Gua Musang	Gua Musang			FT 185 Second East–West Highway – Cameron Highlands, Simpang Pulai, Ipoh; North–South Expressway Northern Route / AH2 – Bukit Kayu Hitam, Penang, Kuala Lumpur; FT 8 (Malaysia Federal Route 8) – Kota Bharu, Kuala Krai, Kuala Lipis, Jerantut, Taman Negara, Raub	Junctions
1.000 mi = 1.609 km; 1.000 km = 0.621 mi
