= Malaysia Federal Route 66 =

Road in Malaysia

Federal Route 66

Route information
- Maintained by Malaysian Public Works Department
- Length: 116.6 km (72.5 mi)

Major junctions
- North end: Jeli
- FT 4 / AH140 East–West Highway FT 4 / AH140 Federal Route 4 D29 State Route D29; D29 State Route D231; FT 8 Federal Route 8
- Southeast end: Kampung Bukit Tebok

Location
- Country: Malaysia
- Primary destinations: Kuala Balah, Gua Musang, Dabong

Highway system
- Highways in Malaysia; Expressways; Federal; State

Federal Route 66 is a federal road in Kelantan, Malaysia, linking the town of Jeli to the village of Kampung Bukit Tebok to Manek Urai.

== Route background ==
The kilometre zero of the Federal Route 66 is located at Jeli. At the first kilometre at Jeli, it is connected with the Federal Route 4.

At most sections, the Federal Route 66 was built under the JKR R5 road standard, allowing maximum speed limit of up to 90 km/h (56 mph).

== Junction lists ==
The entire route is located in Kelantan.

Legend:

- I/C - Interchange, I/S - Intersection, RSA - Rest and service area, OBR - Overhead bridge restaurant, R/R - Restaurant and rest plaza, L/B - Layby, V/P - Vista point, TN - tunnel, T/P - Toll plaza, BR - Bridge
- C - Cloverleaf, S - Stack, T-A - Trumpet-A, T-B - Trumpet-B, DT - Directional-T/Y, SDT - Semi-Directional-T/Y, P-Y - Partial-Y, D - Diamond, P-C - Partial cloverleaf, D-D - Diverging diamond, D-R - Direct ramp

District	Location	km	mi	Name	Destinations	Notes
Jeli	Jeli	0.0	0.0	Jeli	FT 4 / AH140 East–West Highway – Gerik, Butterworth, Kuala Kangsar, Baling, Banding Island, Temenggor Lake, Tanah Merah, Machang, Kota Bharu, Kuala Terengganu	T-junctions
Jeli	Jeli			Kampung Renyok		
Jeli	Jeli			Sungai Pergau bridge		
Jeli	Jeli			Kuala Balah		
Jeli	Jeli			Sungai Balah bridge		
Kuala Krai	Dabong			Kampung Durian Badak		
Kuala Krai	Dabong			Jelawang KESEDAR Village		
Kuala Krai	Dabong			Jalan Dabong–Gua Musang	D29 Kelantan State Route D29 – Gua Musang	T-junctions
Kuala Krai	Dabong			Sungai Galas bridge Railway crossing bridge Dabong Bridge		
Kuala Krai	Dabong			Dabong	D231 Jalan Dabong-Kemubu – Town Centre, Dabong Railway Station, Kemubu	T-junctions
Kuala Krai	Dabong			Kuala Geris		
Kuala Krai	Dabong			Bukit Abu		
Kuala Krai	Dabong			Kampung Baru Bukit Abu		
Kuala Krai	Dabong			Sungai Abu bridge		
Kuala Krai	Kuala Krai			Kampung Sungai Sam		
Kuala Krai	Kuala Krai			Sungai Sam bridge		
Kuala Krai	Kuala Krai	116.0	72.1	Kampung Bukit Tebok	FT 8 Malaysia Federal Route 8 – Kuala Krai, Machang, Kota Bharu, Gua Musang, Kuala Lipis, Raub, Cameron Highlands, Ipoh	T-junctions
1.000 mi = 1.609 km; 1.000 km = 0.621 mi
