= Second East–West Highway =

Road in Malaysia

Federal Route 185 and 36
- Second East–West Highway (Simpang Pulai–Kuala Berang Highway)
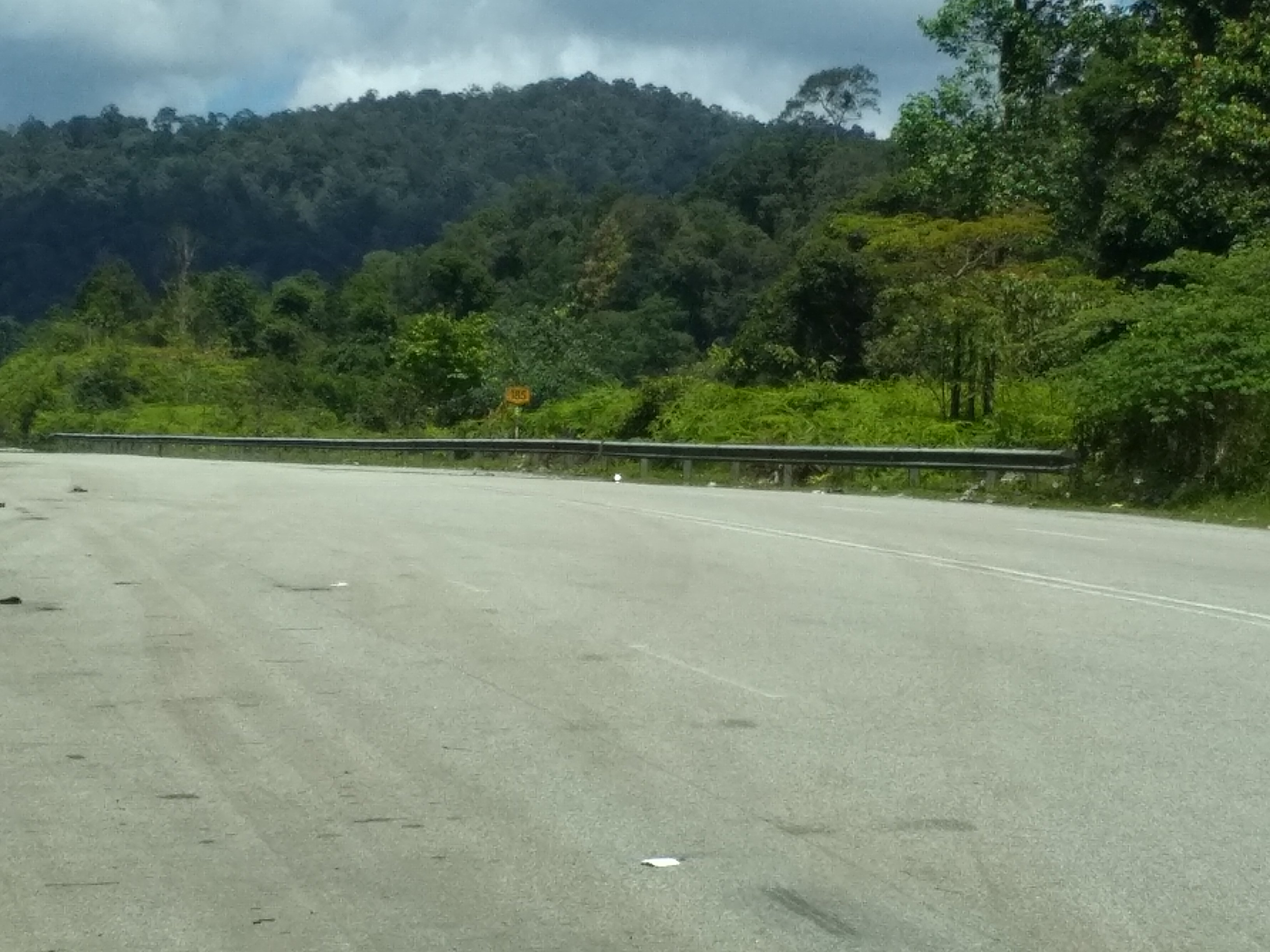

Route information
- Maintained by Malaysian Public Works Department
- Length: 313.6 km (194.9 mi)
- Existed: 2001–present
- History: Completed in 2004

Major junctions
- West end: Simpang Pulai, Perak
- FT 3150 Jalan Lahat–Simpang Pulai; FT 1 Federal Route 1 FT 59 Federal Route 59; FT 8 Federal Route 8 FT 247 Federal Route 247; FT 250 Bukit Payung–Telemung Highway
- East end: Kuala Jeneris, Terengganu

Location
- Country: Malaysia
- Primary destinations: Ipoh, Cameron Highlands, Kota Bharu, Kuala Lipis, Gua Musang, Kenyir Lake, Kuala Terengganu

Highway system
- Highways in Malaysia; Expressways; Federal; State

Second East–West Highway (Malay: Lebuhraya Timur–Barat Kedua), also known as Simpang Pulai–Kuala Berang Highway, Federal Route 185 and Federal Route 36, is a highway in Peninsular Malaysia which connects Simpang Pulai in Perak to Kuala Jeneris in Terengganu. It overlaps with Federal Route 8 Federal Route 8 between Gua Musang and Sungai Relau. It is notorious for its many sharp corners which increase the risk of road accidents.

== Route background ==
The Kilometre Zero of the Federal Route 185 is located at Simpang Pulai, Perak, at its junctions with the Federal Route 1, the main trunk road of the central of Peninsular Malaysia and end at Gua Musang town. Meanwhile, the section from Chiku to Kuala Telemung has been regazetted as Federal Route 36 in February 2017.

Federal Route 185 traverses two of Peninsular Malaysia's main mountain ranges, the Titiwangsa Range (Perak–Pahang–Kelantan) and the Pantai Timur Range (Kelantan–Terengganu). Hence, several tourist attractions can be found along the highway include Cameron Highlands, Lojing and the Kenyir Lake.

== History ==
The highway used to be known as Perak State Route 181 from Simpang Pulai to Pos Slim before being extended eastwards and recommissioned as a federal highway. The construction of the highway began in 2001 and was completed in 2004. Phase 2 was completed at the end of 2010.

=== Location of the project ===
The route runs through the states of Perak, Pahang, Kelantan and Terengganu, starting at Simpang Pulai and traversing through the main range at Lojing, then Chiku, before entering Jalan Felda Aring and ending at Kuala Jeneris.

=== Project scope of work ===
The total distance of the road is 313.66 km (194.90 mi), excluding the 41 km existing road from Gua Musang to Chiku, Kelantan. The road is designed to Malaysian Public Works Department (JKR) geometric standard of R3 with a design speed of 50 km/h.

In terms of riding comfort, this R3 standard falls in between the R5 or R6 standard for expressway (typically with a design speed of 80–110 km/h) and R1 or R2 standard such as the winding hilly road (typically with a design speed of 20–30 km/h).

Typically, the road is a two-lane single carriageway with a lane width of 3.5m and shoulder width of 2.5m. Climbing lanes are also provided at certain sections with steep gradient, to assist slow moving vehicles. The project also involves the construction of viaducts, bridges and culverts.

Those who want to go from Simpang Pulai to Kuala Berang/Kuala Berang to Simpang Pulai must go through part of federal route 8.

=== Estimated cost ===
The entire project is estimated to cost RM1.6 billion and divided into 10 packages for implementation.

== Features ==
FT185 Lojing Viaduct is the second highest bridge in Malaysia.

At most sections, the Federal Route 185 was built under the JKR R5 road standard, allowing maximum speed limit of up to 90 km/h.

The highway overlaps with T156 Jalan Pengkalan Utama from Kenyir Lake to Kuala Jeneris.

An extension of the highway from Kuala Jeneris to Kuala Telemung bypass is under construction to connect Route FT 185 to LPT 2 and Bukit Payung. In September 2024 Citaglobal Engineering Services Sdn Bhd has secured a RM47.56mil job for construction works for Package 8 of the Simpang Pulai–Gua Musang–Kuala Berang road project from Kampung Jeneris to Kuala Telemong (Phase 2 and 3) in Hulu Terengganu, Terengganu. The project will take 12 months to complete.

== Notable events ==
- 20 December 2010 – Twenty-seven people, mostly Thai tourists, were killed when the double-decker coach bus they were travelling in crashed at the Second East–West Highway of the Perak–Pahang border near Cameron Highlands, Pahang.
- In February 2017, Second East–West Highway section from Chiku to Kuala Berang (Jalan Aring 8 & Jalan Aring 5-Kuala Jeneris) regazetted as FT36. Meanwhile, section overlaps with D29 at Gua Musang regazetted as FT185.

== Junction lists ==
Legend:

- I/C - Interchange, I/S - Intersection, RSA - Rest and service area, OBR - Overhead bridge restaurant, R/R - Restaurant and rest plaza, L/B - Layby, V/P - Vista point, TN - tunnel, T/P - Toll plaza, BR - Bridge
- C - Cloverleaf, S - Stack, T-A - Trumpet-A, T-B - Trumpet-B, DT - Directional-T/Y, SDT - Semi-Directional-T/Y, P-Y - Partial-Y, D - Diamond, P-C - Partial cloverleaf, D-D - Diverging diamond, D-R - Direct ramp

State	District	Location	km	mi	Name	Destinations	Notes
Perak	Kinta	Simpang Pulai	0.0	0.0	Simpang Pulai; Simpang Pulai I/S	FT 1 Malaysia Federal Route 1 – Ipoh, Batu Gajah, Gopeng; FT 3150 Jalan Lahat–Simpang Pulai – Lahat, Pasir Pinji; North–South Expressway Northern Route / AH2 – Alor Setar, Penang, Kuala Lumpur	Junctions
Perak	Kinta	Simpang Pulai			Simpang Pulai Fire Station		
Perak	Kinta	Simpang Pulai			Sungai Raya bridge		
Perak	Kinta	Simpang Pulai			Petronas L/B		
Perak	Kinta	Simpang Pulai			Simpang Pulai Quarry		
Perak	Kinta	Simpang Pulai	15.0	9.3	Four-lane carriageway sections		
Perak	Kinta	Simpang Pulai			Viaduct		
Pahang	Cameron Highlands	Cameron Highlands			Cameron Highlands; Avant Chocolate	Avant Chocolate	
Pahang	Cameron Highlands	Cameron Highlands			Cameron Highlands; Kampung Raja		
Pahang	Cameron Highlands	Cameron Highlands			Cameron Highlands; Cameron Highlands (North) I/S	FT 59 Malaysia Federal Route 59 – Cameron Highlands, Kampung Raja, Tringkap, Brinchang, Tanah Rata, Tapah, Sungai Koyan, Tourist attractions	T-junctions
Kelantan	Gua Musang	Lojing			Pos Sigar	Pos Sigar Orang Asli village	T-junctions
Kelantan	Gua Musang	Lojing			Sungai Pangoi bridge		
Kelantan	Gua Musang	Lojing			Pos Brooke	Pos Brooke Orang Asli village	T-junctions
Kelantan	Gua Musang	Lojing			Sungai Lojing bridge		
Kelantan	Gua Musang	Lojing			Pos Mering	Pos Mering Orang Asli village, Lojing Highlands	T-junctions
Kelantan	Gua Musang	Lojing			Lojing Viaduct; Sungai Chenderoh bridge		
Kelantan	Gua Musang	Lojing			Lojing	Lojing Highlands	T-junctions
Kelantan	Gua Musang	Lojing			Sungai Berok bridge		
Kelantan	Gua Musang	Lojing			Kampung Sungkai		
Kelantan	Gua Musang	Gua Musang			Ulu Nenggiri I/S	FT 484 Jalan Ulu Nenggiri – Ulu Nenggiri, Kampung Pilting	T-junctions
Kelantan	Gua Musang	Gua Musang			Gua Musang; Gua Musang Town I/S	D29 Jalan Dabong–Gua Musang – Dabong, Jeli, Kuala Lipis, Jerantut, Raub, Taman Negara	Junctions
Kelantan	Gua Musang	Gua Musang			Gua Musang–Chiku	see also FT 8 Malaysia Federal Route 8	
Kelantan	Gua Musang	Chiku			Chiku; Chiku I/S	FT 8 Malaysia Federal Route 8 – Kota Bharu, Kuala Krai	T-junctions
Kelantan	Gua Musang	Aring			FELDA Aring		
Kelantan	Gua Musang	Aring			Relai River Bridge		
Kelantan	Gua Musang	Aring			Aring River Bridge		
Kelantan	Gua Musang	Aring			Kampung Kabang		
Kelantan	Gua Musang	Aring			Sungai Lebir bridge		
Kelantan	Gua Musang	Aring			Kampung Lanchang		
Terengganu	Hulu Terengganu	Kenyir Lake			Sungai Kembur Viaduct		
Terengganu	Hulu Terengganu	Kenyir Lake			TNB Puah Hydroelectric Dam	TNB Puah Hydroelectric Dam	T-junctions
Terengganu	Hulu Terengganu	Kenyir Lake			Sungai Kelempai Viaduct		
Terengganu	Hulu Terengganu	Kenyir Lake			Pasir Pulau Viaduct		
Terengganu	Hulu Terengganu	Kenyir Lake			Sungai Purun Viaduct		
Terengganu	Hulu Terengganu	Kenyir Lake			Sungai Jeneris Viaduct		
Terengganu	Hulu Terengganu	Kenyir Lake			Jalan Pengkalan Utama I/S	T156 Jalan Pengkalan Utama – TNB Pengkalan Gawi Dam, Telemung Waterfall	T-junctions
Terengganu	Hulu Terengganu	Kenyir Lake			Kenyir Lake RSA		
Terengganu	Hulu Terengganu	Kenyir Lake			Kenyir Lake; Kenyir Lake I/S	Kenyir Lake – Pengkalan Gawi (Jetty), Kenyir Lake Resort and Spa, Kenyir Lake Visitor Centre	T-junctions
Terengganu	Hulu Terengganu	Kuala Jeneris			Kampung Basung		
Terengganu	Hulu Terengganu	Kuala Jeneris			Pelung I/S	T151 Jalan Pelung – Pelung	T-junctions
Terengganu	Hulu Terengganu	Kuala Jeneris			Kampung Pasir Duta		
Terengganu	Hulu Terengganu	Kuala Jeneris			Kuala Jeneris; Kuala Jeneris I/S	FT 247 Malaysia Federal Route 14 – Sungai Tong, Setiu, Besut, Kuala Berang, Ajil; FT 250 Bukit Payung–Telemung Highway – Kuala Terengganu, Bukit Payong, Telemong; East Coast Expressway – Kuantan, Kuala Lumpur	Junctions
1.000 mi = 1.609 km; 1.000 km = 0.621 mi: Closed/former; Concurrency terminus; Unopened

== Gallery ==
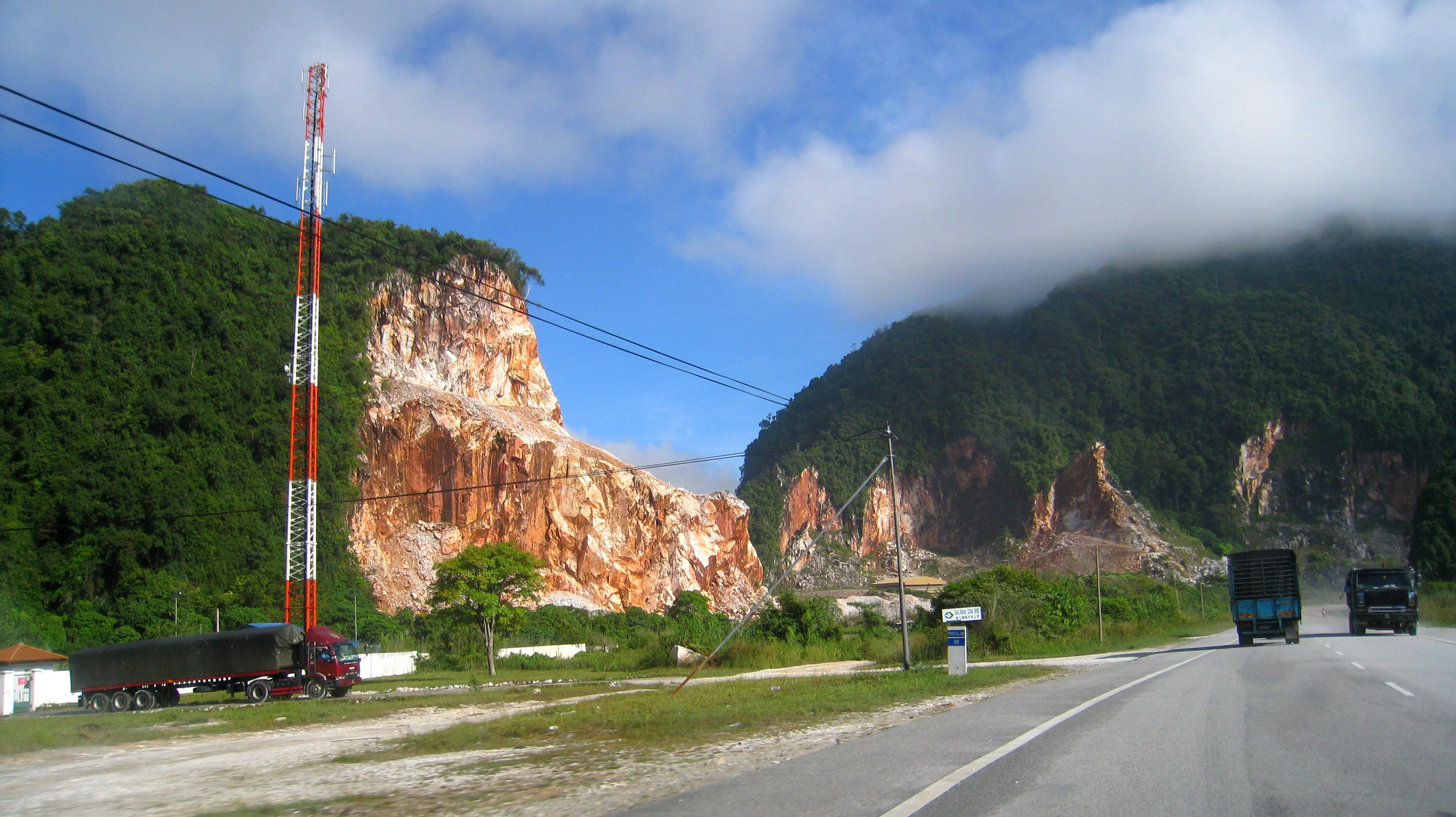
FT185 near its west end in Simpang Pulai, eastbound

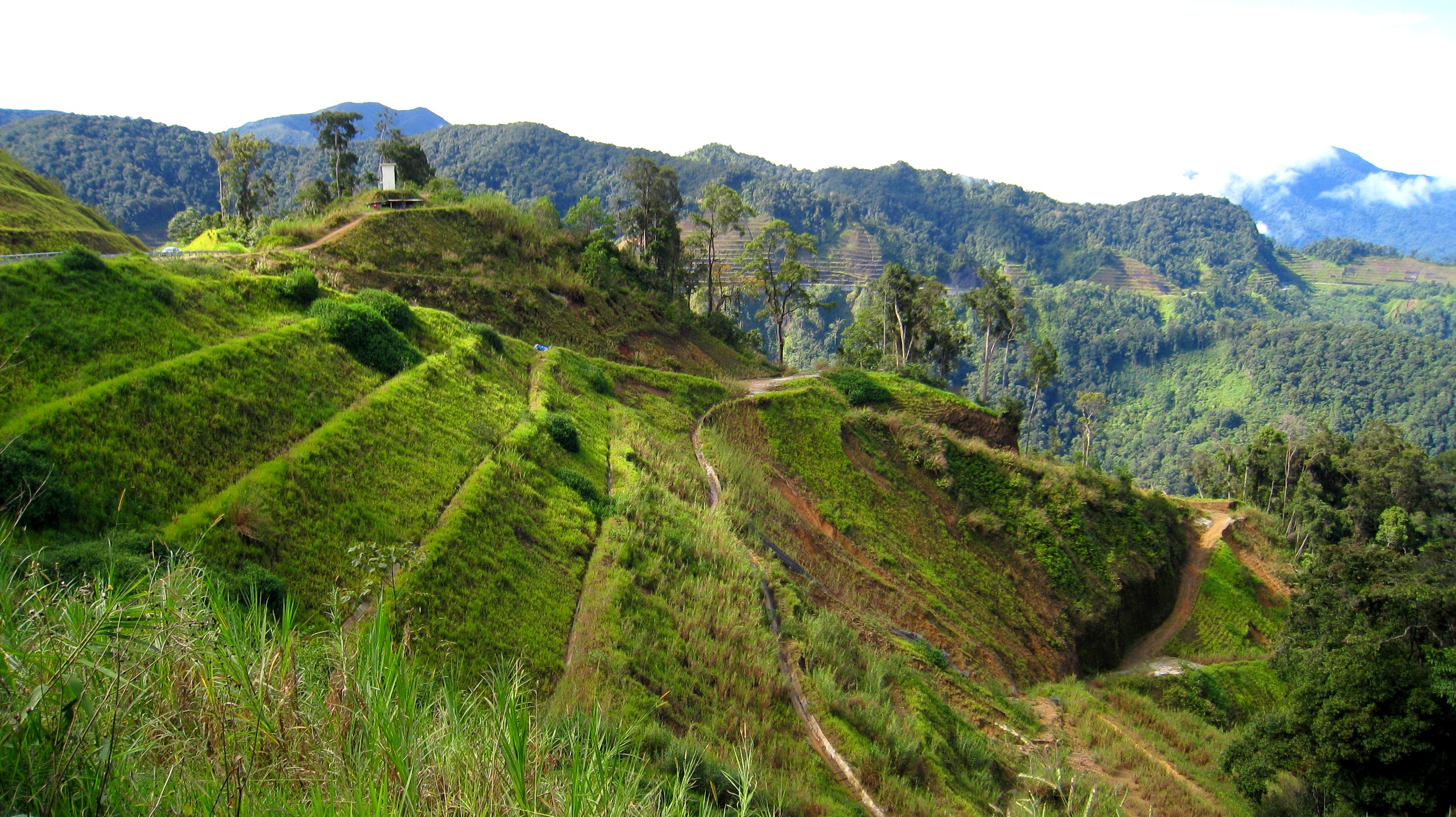
FT185 snakes up through the Titiwangsa Mountains near the border with Pahang, not far from Cameron Highlands

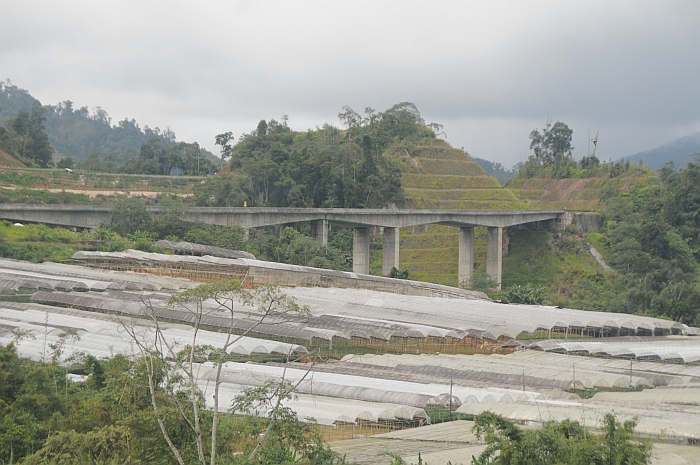
Lojing Viaduct, Lojing

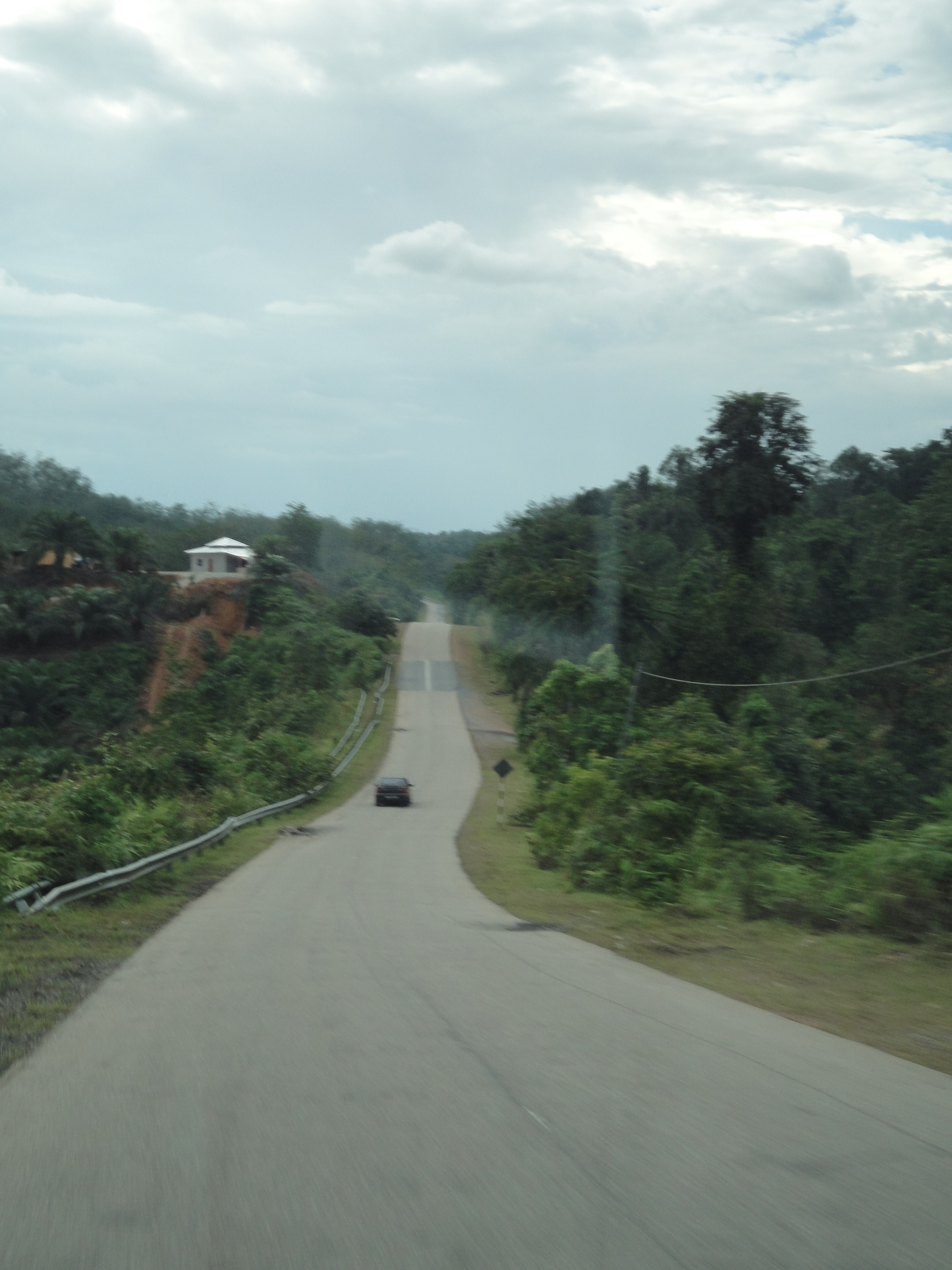
The highway near Aring, towards the border with Terengganu. Taken prior to widening.

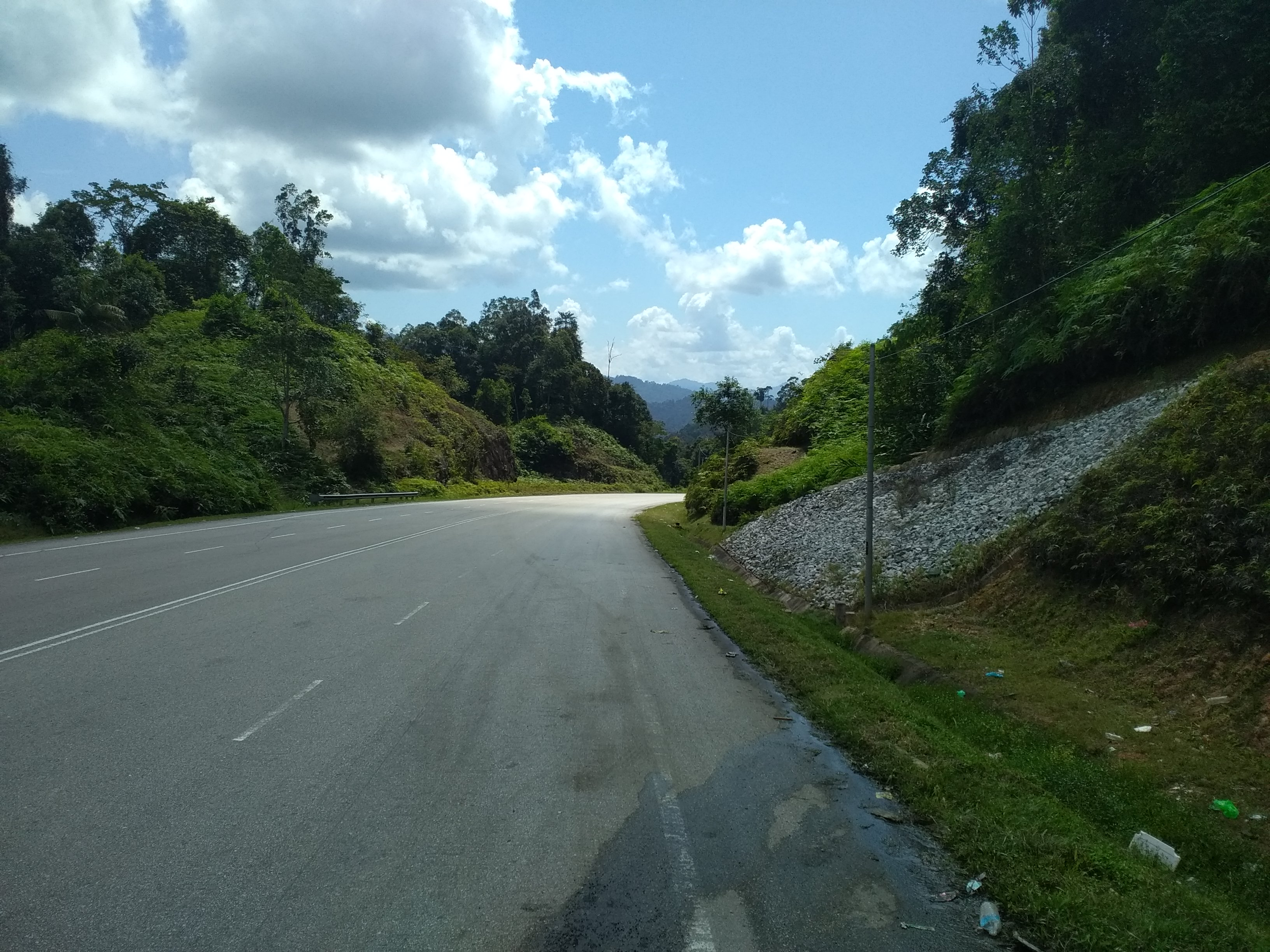
The Terengganuan section of FT185, near Kenyir Lake

== See also ==
- East–West Highway
