= Blue Valley =

Blue Valley may refer to any one of the following:

Places

- Blue Valley, Malaysia, a town in Pahang, Malaysia
- Blue Valley (Wayne County, Utah), a region in Utah
- Blue Valley Unified School District, a unified school district in Kansas
- Blue Valley (comics)

Movies

- Blue Valley Songbird, a movie starring Dolly Parton
