= Masjid Tengku Razaleigh =

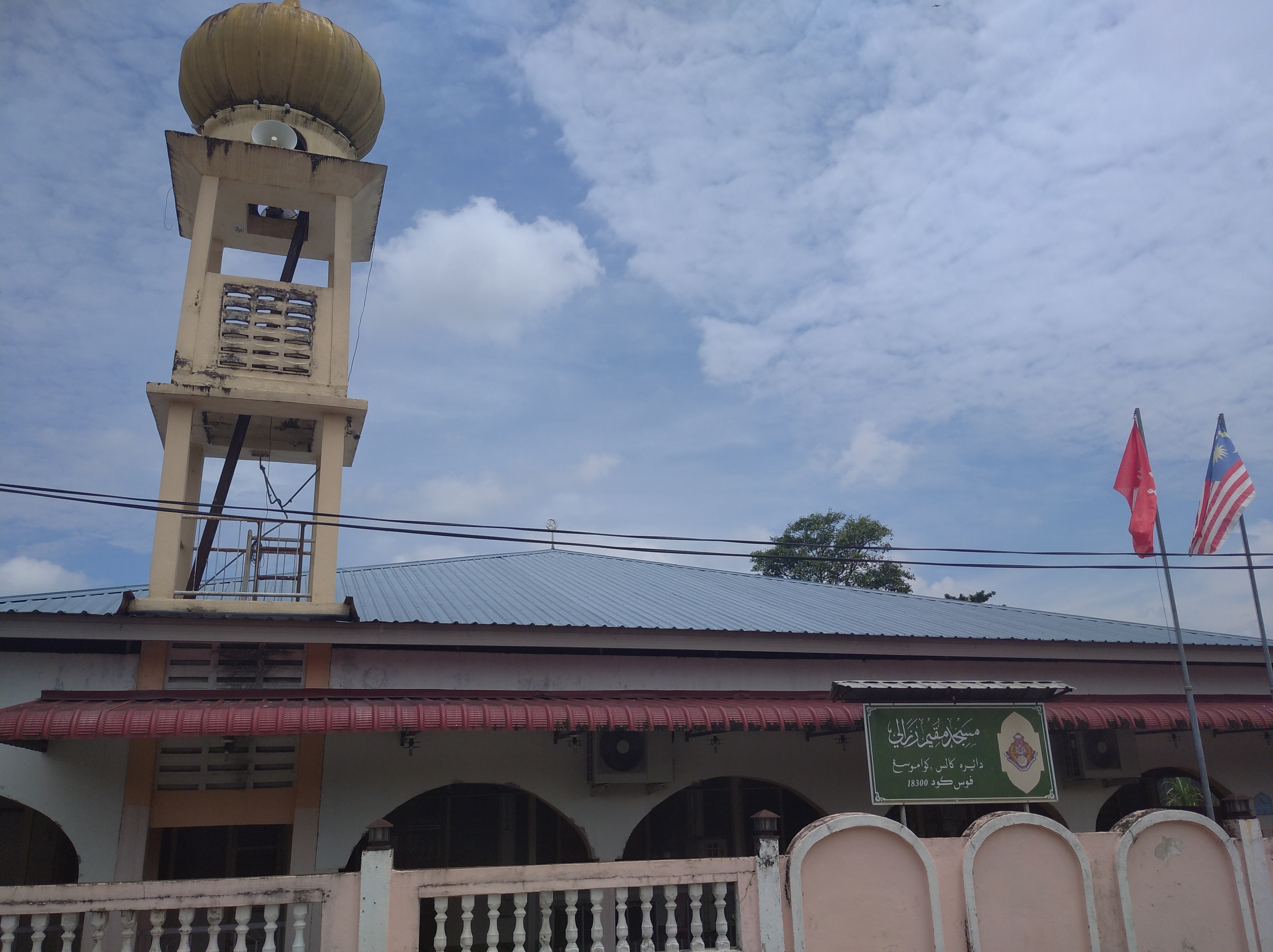
- Masjid Tengku Razaleigh in 2021.

- Location in Malaysia

Religion
- Affiliation: Twelver Shi'a Islam (formerly Sunni)

Location
- Location: Pekan Gua Musang, 18300 Gua Musang, Kelantan, Malaysia
- Country: Malaysia
- Interactive map of Masjid Tengku Razaleigh
- Coordinates: 4.8848533°N 101.9659185°E

Architecture
- Type: Mosque
- Style: Traditional Malay architecture
- Established: 1940s

Specifications
- Minaret: 1
- Shrine: 1 (Nik Moh)

Masjid Tengku Razaleigh is a mosque located in the Gua Musang District within Kelantan, Malaysia. Built in the 1940s, it is one of the earliest mosques in the district, along with Masjid Tengku Muhammad Faiz Petra. The mosque is named after Tengku Razaleigh Hamzah, the former Member of Parliament for the Gua Musang District. Due to its small size and repeated damage from constant flooding, the mosque was replaced by Masjid Jamek Razaleigh, a larger mosque located a few metres away from the site. Although still open to the public, it does not hold daily or Friday prayers anymore.

== Tomb of Nik Moh ==
In the middle of the prayer hall of the mosque, there is a grave of a pregnant woman named Nik Moh who was murdered in an ambush in 1948 by the soldiers of the Malayan People's Anti-Japanese Army (MPAJA). The grave was originally located outside the mosque, but it ended up inside the main prayer hall of the mosque after a major reconstruction in the late 1970s. This grave remained inside the mosque and was never removed in order to serve as a memorial to the Malaysians that were killed by the MPAJA. Due to controversies regarding the topic of having a grave inside the main prayer hall of a mosque, religious scholars of Kelantan issued a fatwa that a barrier be built over the grave to ensure that it is not visible to the worshippers in the mosque.

The grave is still present inside the main prayer hall of the mosque, but is now covered with a bookshelf that completely disguises it. It can still be accessed by opening the cabinet doors at the base of the bookshelf. It is still venerated amongst residents of Gua Musang, who petition for it to be preserved, even if the mosque has to be demolished in future.

== Transportation ==
Masjid Tengku Razaleigh is accessible from the Gua Musang railway station, which is served by four KTM Intercity services.

== See also ==
- List of mosques in Malaysia
