= Dabong Bridge =

Bridge in Dabong, Kelantan, Malaysia

Dabong Bridge Jambatan Dabong
- Coordinates: 5°22′11″N 102°00′27″E
- Carries: Motor vehicles, Pedestrians
- Crosses: Galas River
- Locale: Jalan Dabong
- Official name: Dabong Bridge
- Maintained by: Malaysian Public Works Department (JKR) Kuala Krai

Characteristics
- Design: box girder
- Total length: --
- Width: --
- Longest span: --

History
- Designer: Government of Malaysia; Malaysian Public Works Department (JKR)
- Constructed by: Malaysian Public Works Department (JKR)
- Opened: 2006

Dabong Bridge is a bridge in Dabong, Kelantan, Malaysia. It was built between 2004 and 2006. This bridge was officially opened on 20 August 2006 by Malaysian Prime Minister Abdullah Ahmad Badawi.

== See also ==
- Transport in Malaysia
