= Lojing Viaduct =

Lojing Viaduct Jambatan Lojing
- Coordinates: 4°43′28″N 101°37′33″E
- Carries: Motor vehicles
- Crosses: Chenderoh River; Lojing Highlands, Titiwangsa Mountains
- Locale: FT 185 Second East-West Highway, Kelantan
- Official name: Lojing Viaduct
- Maintained by: Malaysian Public Works Department (JKR) Gua Musang; Roadcare Sdn Bhd

Characteristics
- Design: double box girder bridge
- Total length: --
- Width: --
- Height: --
- Longest span: --

History
- Designer: Malaysian Public Works Department (JKR)
- Constructed by: Malaysian Public Works Department (JKR); Cergas Murni Sdn Bhd
- Opened: 2005

Lojing Viaduct is the third highest bridge in Malaysia. The double box girder bridge is located at FT 185 Second East-West Highway (Federal Route FT 185) near Lojing, Kelantan. It opened in 2005. Lojing Viaduct was previously he highest bridge in Malaysia, but in 2018, FT 37 Rawang Bypass opened to the public and became the highest bridge in Malaysia, overtaking FT 185 Lojing Viaduct. The highest pillar is 58.2 m from ground level.
