= Kampung Pulai =

Malaysian village

Coordinates: 4°47′34.1″N 101°56′55.7″E

Kampung Pulai is a traditional village in an area of limestone hills in Malaysia, located about 8 km from Gua Musang in Kelantan. The Pulai Princess Cave is nearby. The village was settled centuries ago by Hakka people from China.
