= 2010 Cameron Highlands bus crash =

Road incident in Malaysia

Coordinates: 4.75°N 101°E

Details
- Date: 20 December 2010; 11:40am
- Location: near Blue Valley in the Cameron Highlands; 129.5 km (80.5 mi) NNW from Kuala Lumpur
- Country: Malaysia
- Owner: Syarikat Bas SK Murni Tours and Travels

Statistics
- Passengers: 37
- Deaths: 27
- Injured: 10
- Damage: removal of front axle/tires, removal of roof

The 2010 Cameron Highlands bus crash was, until 2013, the worst road accident in Malaysian history. Twenty-seven passengers of the double-decked coach bus, mostly Thai tourists, were killed in the accident which took place near Cameron Highlands of the Perak-Pahang border. It occurred on 20 December 2010 at approximately 11:40 am, when the bus driver, Omar Shahidan, lost control of the bus as it was going down an incline and it crashed into a rocky slope at 150 kilometres an hour, off the Second East-West Highway.
