= Masjid Jamek Razaleigh =

Modern mosque in Kelantan, Malaysia

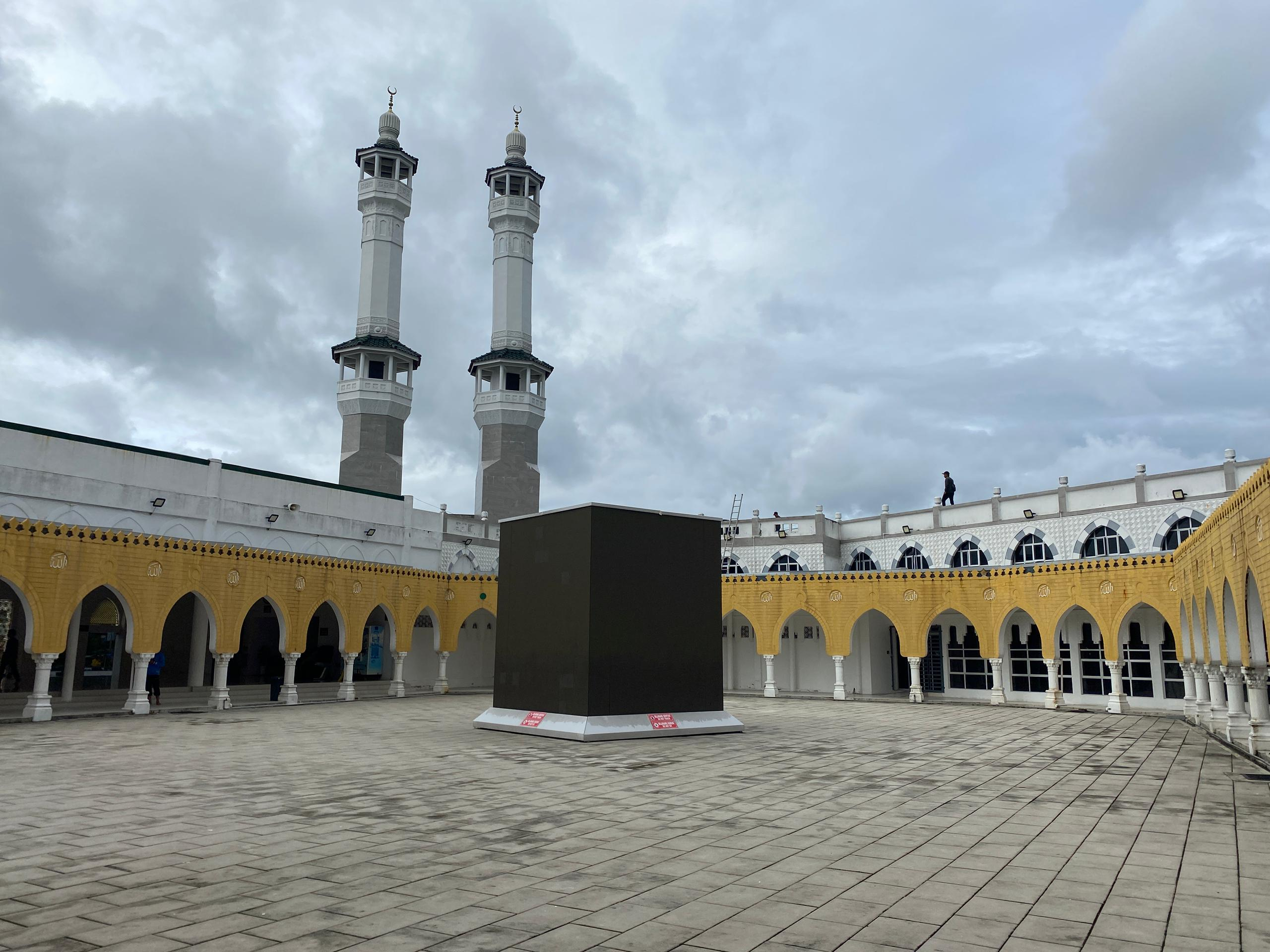
- View of the mosque from inside its courtyard.

- Location in Malaysia

Religion
- Affiliation: Sunni Islam

Location
- Location: Jalan Pejabat PAS, Pekan Gua Musang, 18300 Gua Musang, Kelantan, Malaysia
- Country: Malaysia
- Interactive map of Masjid Jamek Razaleigh
- Coordinates: 4.8813570°N 101.9657840°E

Architecture
- Type: Mosque
- Style: Mix of Ottoman, Mamluk and contemporary modern styles
- Established: 2016
- Completed: 2022

Specifications
- Dome: 5
- Minaret: 9

Masjid Jamek Razaleigh, alternatively called Masjid Mukim Razaleigh (Jawi: الحرم الغاري الشريف) and nicknamed Al-Ḥaram al-Ghārī ash-Sharīf, is a mosque located in the Gua Musang District within Kelantan, Malaysia. Completed in 2022, its construction was delayed for two years due to the COVID-19 pandemic. A tourist destination of Kelantan, the mosque is well known for its architectural style and design which is intended to replicate the Masjid al-Haram in Mecca.

== History ==
Before the construction of the mosque, the only mosque in the area was Masjid Razaleigh Lama which was not able to accommodate a large number of worshippers for the Friday prayers as well as festive prayers. The old mosque was also very prone to flooding due to its location on the banks of the Galas River, with such incidents causing extensive damage to the mosque. A religious issue also arose, that being that the old Masjid Razaleigh contained a grave in the centre of its main prayer hall, which led to conservative Muslims in the area not praying in the mosque due to an Islamic scholarly view that graves should not be in the main prayer hall of a mosque. After all these issues had been considered, Tengku Hamzah, the former Member of Parliament for the Gua Musang District, confirmed that a new mosque would be constructed at a nearby site.

A site next to the neighborhood police station in the centre of the village was chosen. Construction on the mosque soon began in April 2016. The mosque was almost completed in 2020 but due to the COVID-19 pandemic, completion was delayed. Masjid Jamek Razaleigh was ultimately completed in 2022 and opened in April of that year.

== Architecture ==
Masjid Jamek Razaleigh is renowned for being a smaller yet functional replica of the Masjid al-Haram, the first holy site of all Muslims that is located in Mecca. There is also a life-sized replica of the Ka'aba in the courtyard of the mosque. Like the mosque it is based on, the architectural style of Masjid Jamek Razaleigh combines Umayyad, Mamluk and Ottoman architectural elements with modern elements.

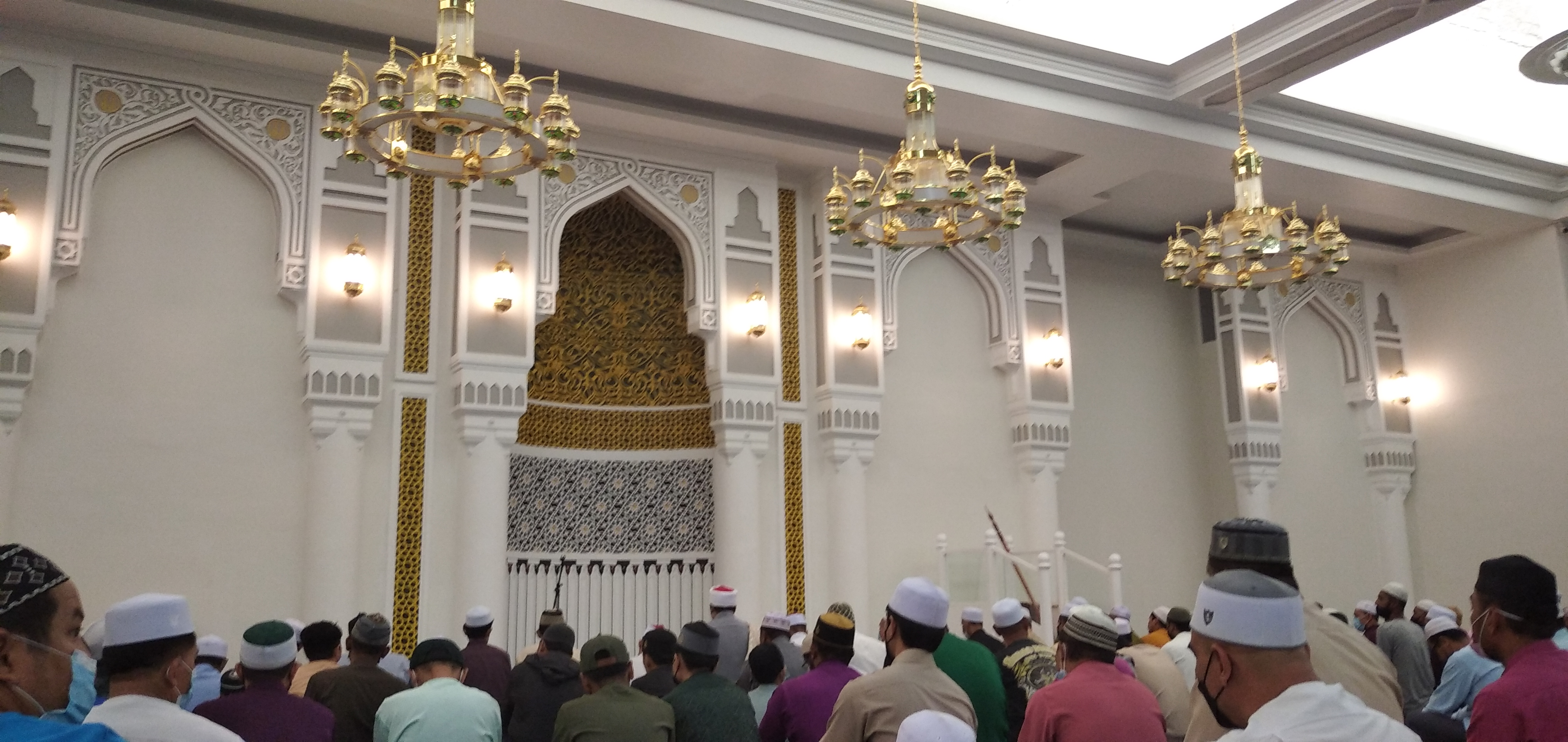
Worshippers inside the main prayer hall of the mosque.

The mosque buildings all skewer off from the main street in order to face Mecca. Nine minarets flank the main mosque building, each resembling the minarets of Masjid al-Haram. Three identical domes top the entrance of the main prayer hall that overlooks the courtyard. The main prayer hall is fully carpeted, while white tiles adorn the floors of areas within the mosque that are not carpeted. Fifteen doors lead into the courtyard of the mosque, where a cuboid intended as a replica of the Ka'aba is situated. A replica kiswa (cloth covering) wraps around the cuboid, giving it a similar appearance to the real Ka'aba in Mecca.

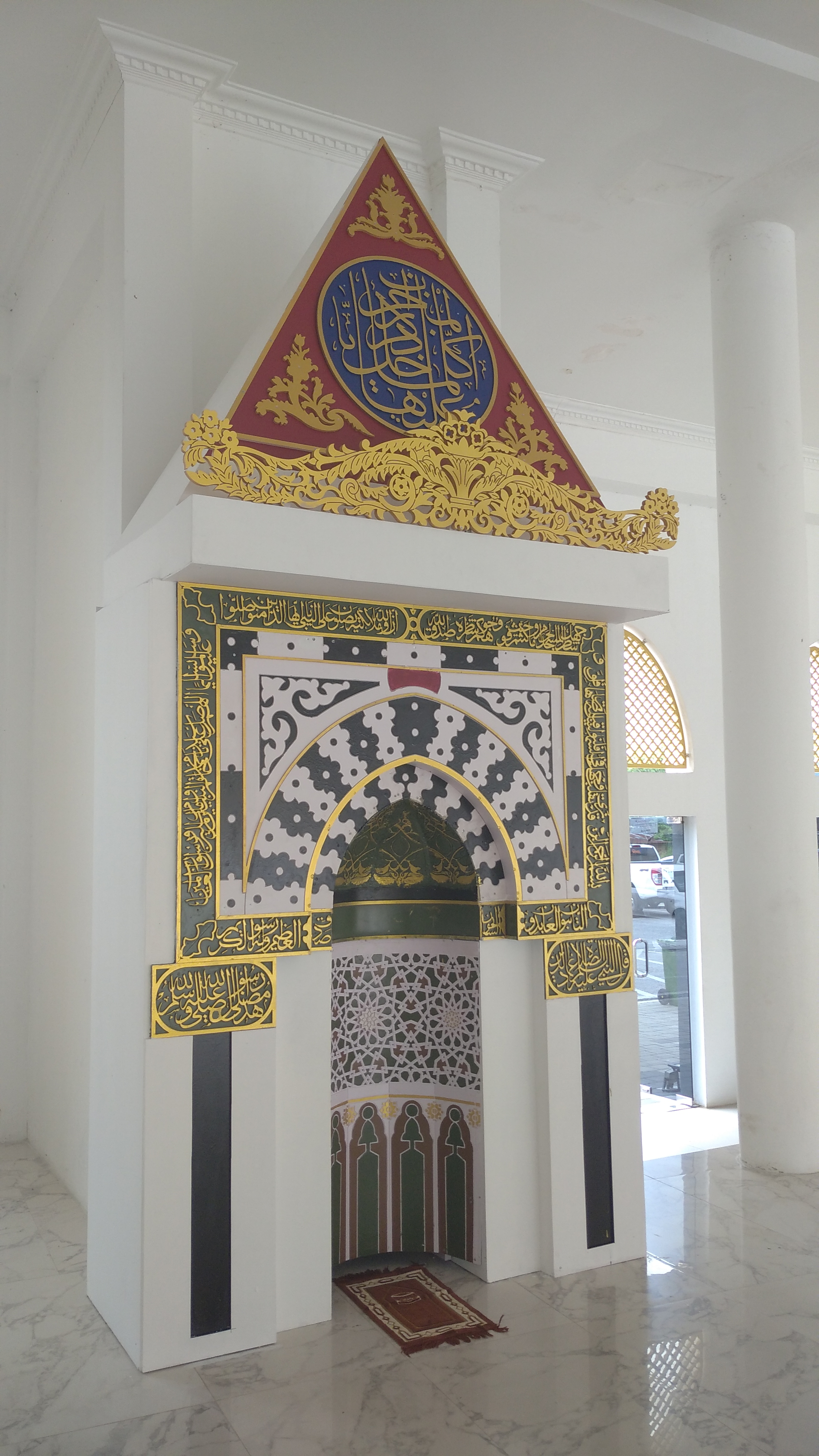
One of the two mihrabs in the Mihrab Corridor of the mosque.

Next to the main prayer hall is a corridor known as the Mihrab Corridor. As its name suggests, the corridor features two elaborately carved mihrabs to indicate the direction of prayer. This corridor is only used for prayers during events where there will be a large number of congregants, such as the Friday prayers as well as prayers on the two Eids.

== Transportation ==
The mosque is accessible from the Gua Musang railway station, which is served by four KTM Intercity services.

== See also ==
- List of mosques in Malaysia
