= Pasir Pinji =

Pasir Pinji may refer to:

- Pasir Pinji (federal constituency)
- Pasir Pinji (state constituency)
