= Simpang Pulai =

Town in Perak, Malaysia

- Suburb of Ipoh
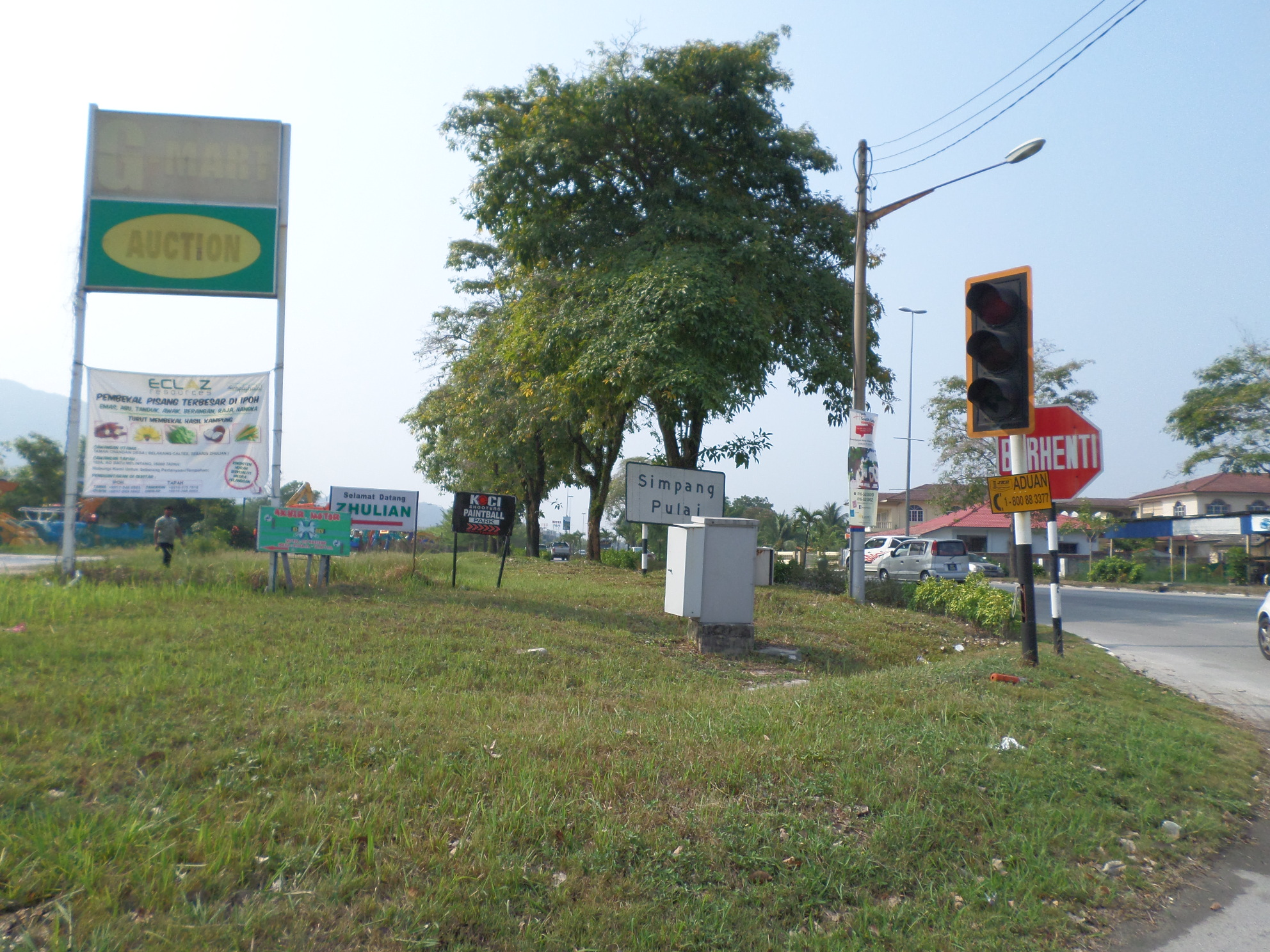
- Simpang Pulai

- Location of Simpang Pulai Simpang Pulai (Peninsular Malaysia) Simpang Pulai (Malaysia)
- Coordinates: 4°28′N 101°10′E
- Country: Malaysia
- State: Perak
- District: Kinta
- Time zone: UTC+8 (MYT)
- Postal code: 30020

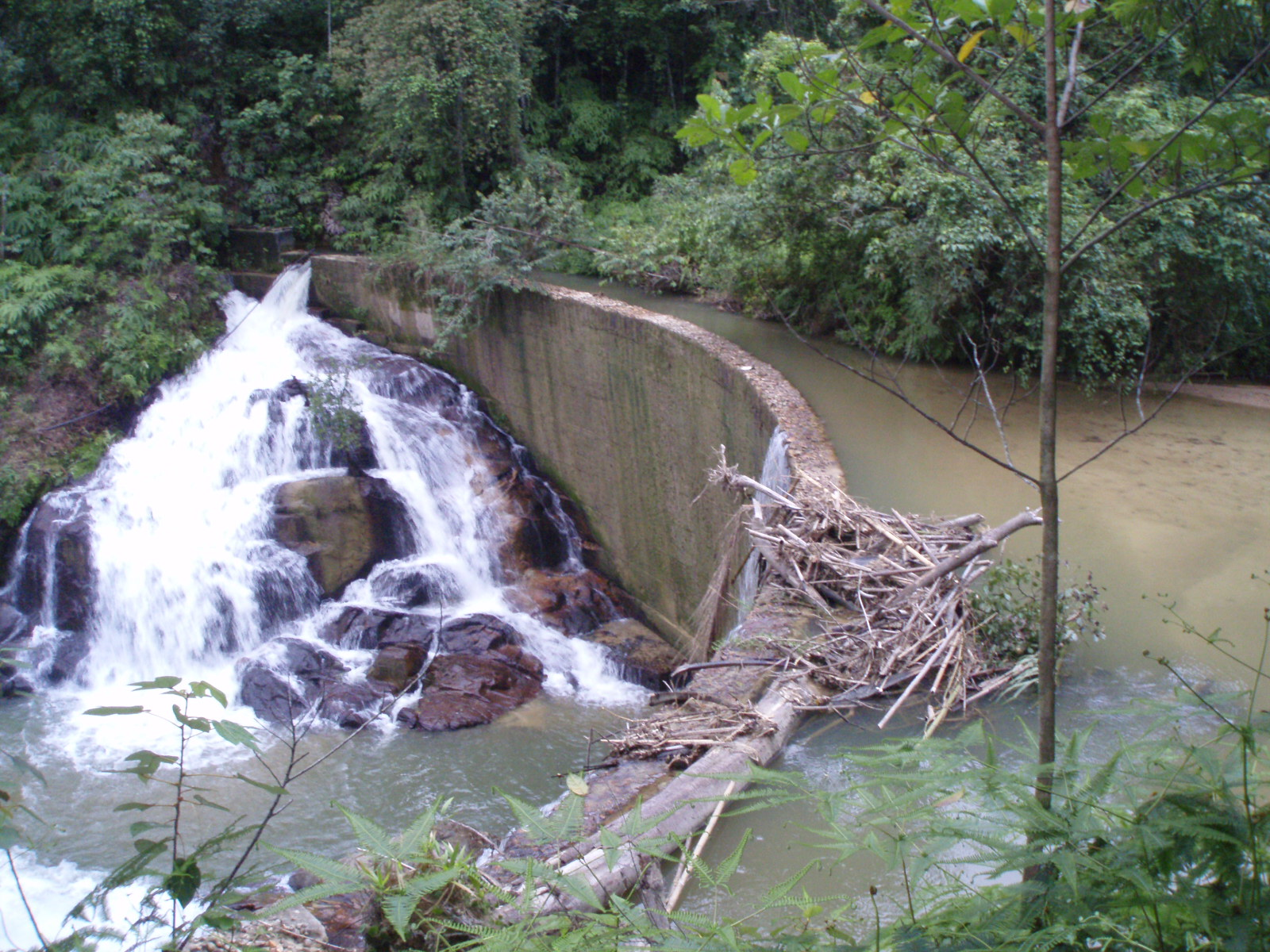
Simpang Pulai waterfall

Simpang Pulai is a town in Kinta District, Perak, Malaysia.

== Transportation ==
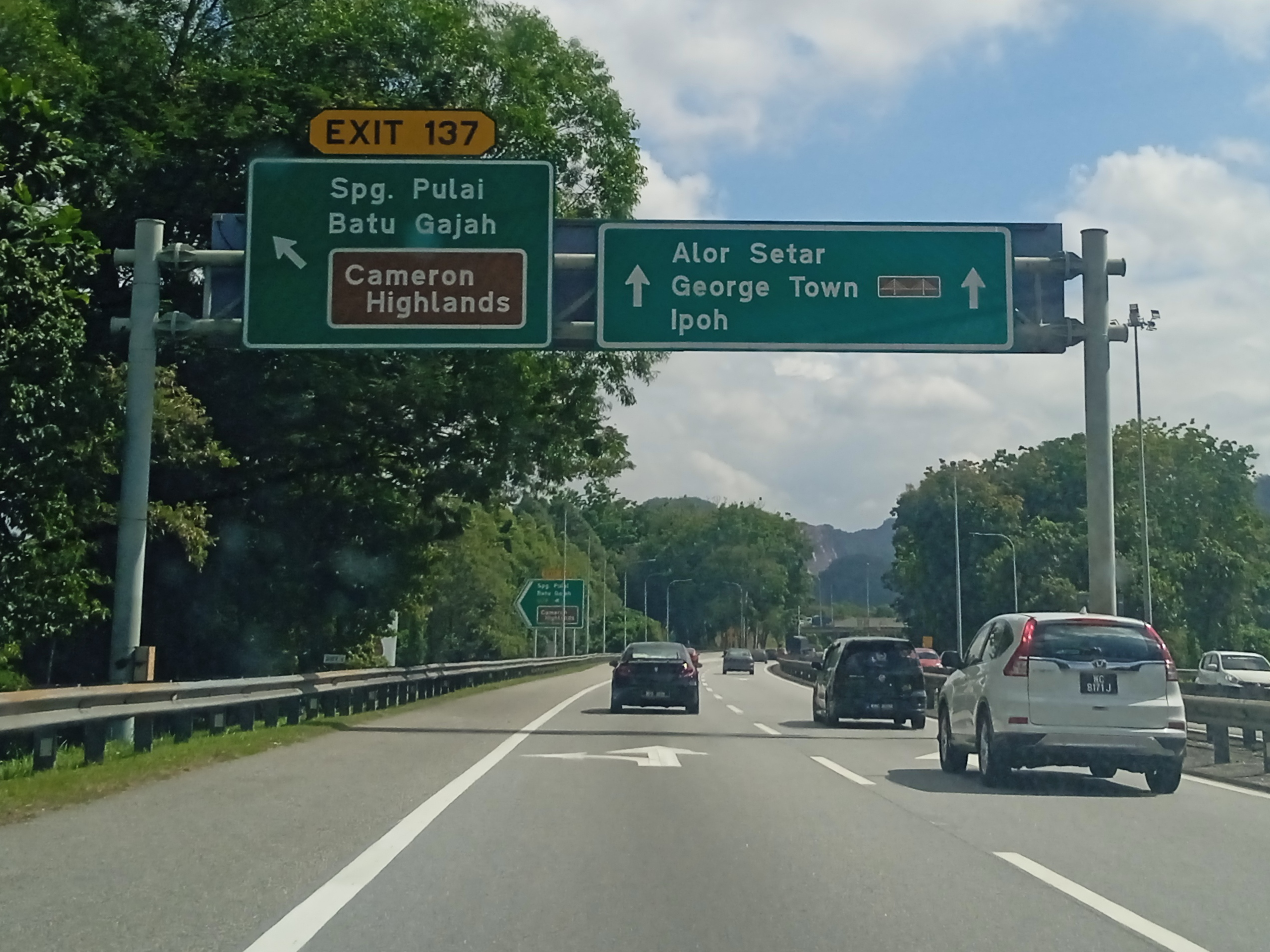
E1 northbound toward Simpang Pulai Interchange

=== Car ===
Simpang Pulai is perhaps famous for being the newest gateway for Perakian motorists to the east coast states of Pahang, Kelantan and Terengganu – the Second East–West Highway (Federal Route 185) begins here, passes through Cameron Highlands in Pahang, then Gua Musang in Kelantan before terminating in Kuala Jenderis in Hulu Terengganu.

The PLUS Expressway exit 137 serves Simpang Pulai.

== Other features ==
A Ria Moda Jakel Trading Textile Company opened its branch here at the corner lot of the Simpang Pulai intersection.
