= Lahat, Malaysia =

Suburb of Malaysia

Coordinates: 4.5407117°N 101.0365722°E

Lahat is a suburb of Ipoh, Perak, Malaysia.
