= Lojing =

Lojing Autonomous Sub-District
- Autonomous sub-district of Gua Musang District
- Jajahan Kecil Lojing
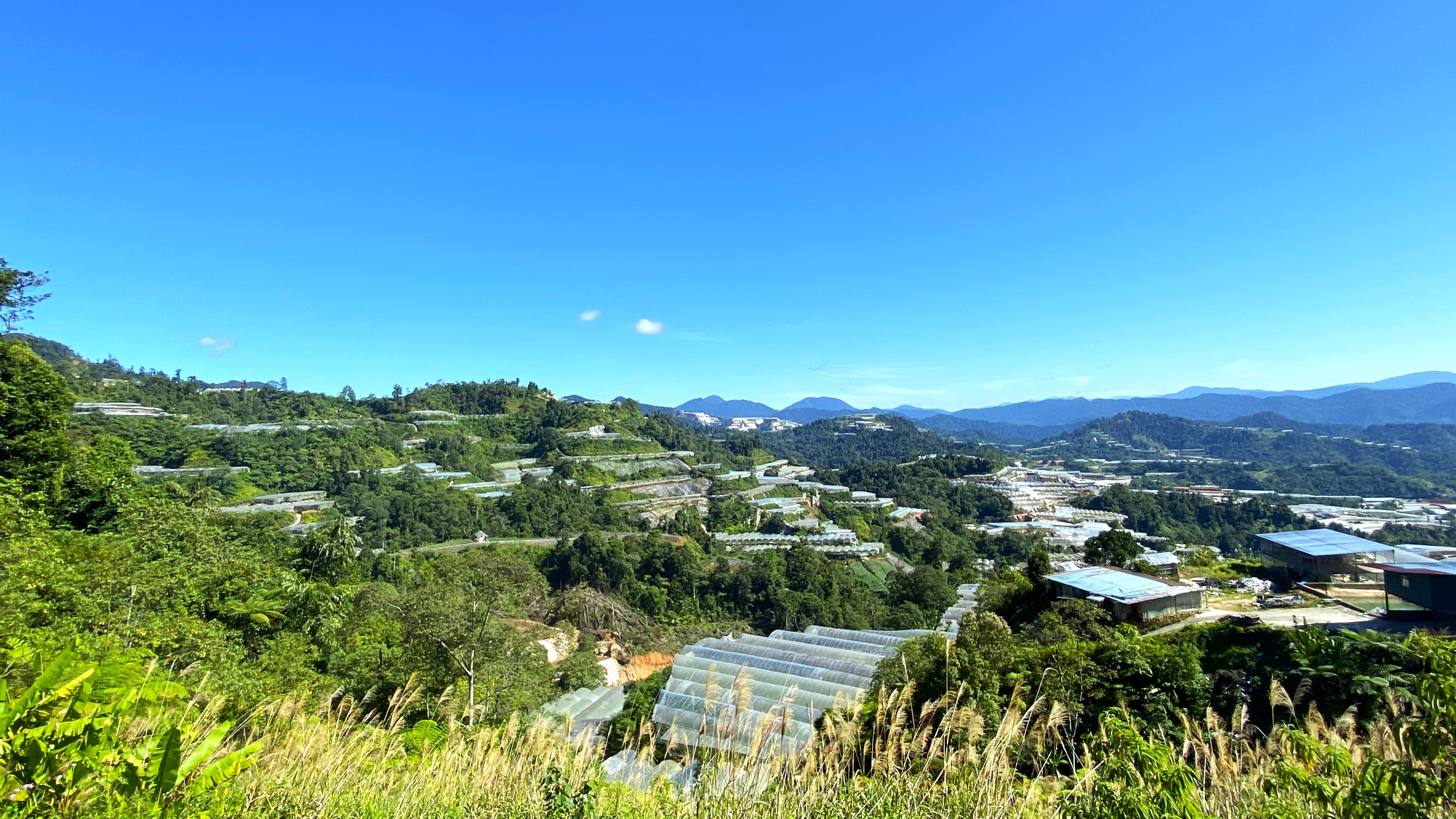
- Lojing Highlands

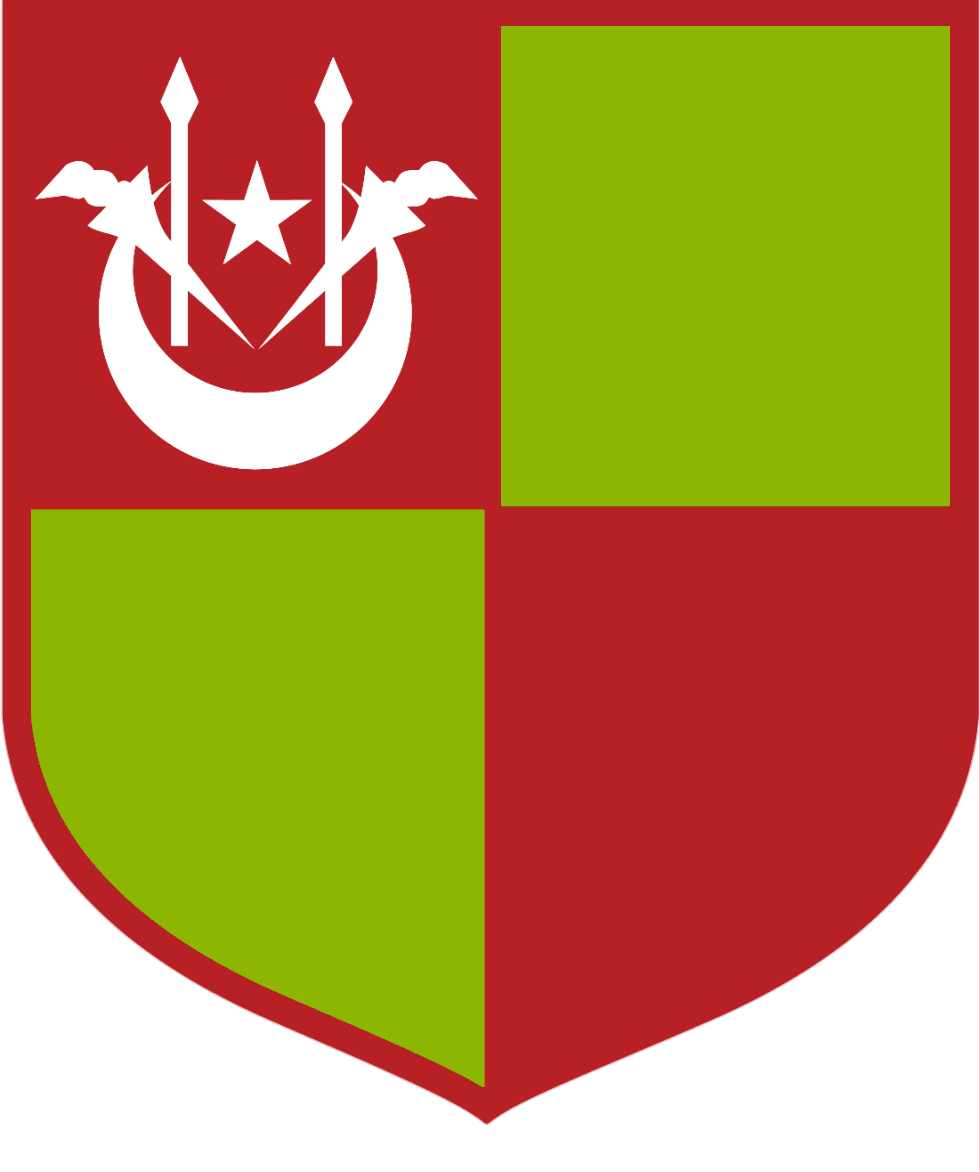
- Flag Coat of arms
- Interactive map of Lojing Autonomous Sub-District
- Location of Lojing in Kelantan Lojing Autonomous Sub-District (Malaysia)
- Coordinates: 4°38′N 101°28′E
- Country: Malaysia
- State: Kelantan
- District: Gua Musang District

Government
  - District officer: Shahrin bin Abdullah
  - Administrative office: Pejabat Tanah dan Jajahan Kecil Lojing

Area
  - Total: 1,817 km^{2} (702 sq mi)

Population (2021)
  - Total: 10,700
  - Density: 5.89/km^{2} (15.3/sq mi)
- Time zone: UTC+8 (MST)
  - Summer (DST): UTC+8 (Not observed)
- Postcode: 18350
- Calling code: +6-09
- Vehicle registration plates: D

The Lojing Autonomous Sub-District (Malay: Jajahan Kecil Lojing), or colloquially known as the Lojing Highlands (Malay: Tanah Tinggi Lojing) is a mountainous region in Gua Musang District, Kelantan, Malaysia. It is located next to the famed Cameron Highlands in Pahang, along the Second East-West Highway Federal Route 185.

== Administration ==
Map of Lojing Autonomous Sub-District

In 2010 Lojing was made an autonomous sub-district (Jajahan Kecil Lojing). Several state and federal agencies will open their branches there following the arrangement; municipal works remain under the responsibility of Gua Musang. It is divided into seven communes:

- Balar
- Blau
- Hau
- Hendrop
- Kuala Betis
- Sigar
- Tuel

== Geography and demographics ==
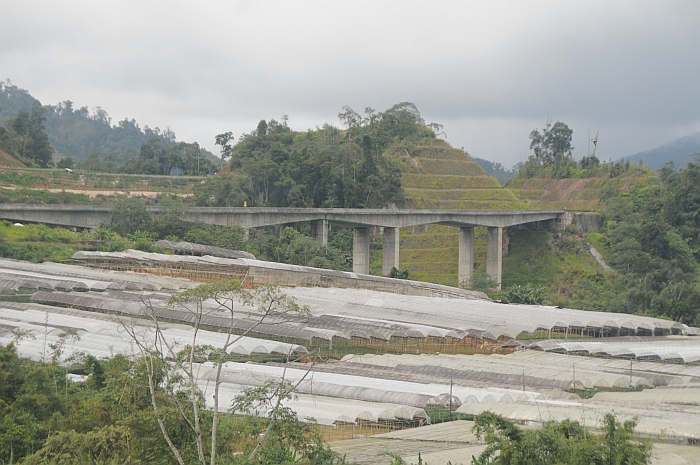
Nurseries in Lojing. The bridge in the background carries Federal Route 185, also known as the Second East-West Highway.

Perched up high on the intersection between the Kelantanese, Pahangese and Perakian Titiwangsa, Lojing Highlands is rich in flora and fauna and is famed for its biodiversity. Its well preserved pristine hills and jungles are popular eco-tourist attraction. There are many species of high-quality tropical hardwood such as teak, mahogany, chengal and meranti located in the jungles of the Lojing Highlands. Lojing is home to the 2,181-metre-tall Yong Belar, the tallest mountain in Kelantan and third tallest in Peninsular Malaysia.

Most of the people that live in the Lojing area belong to the indigenous Orang Asli tribes, mainly the Temiar tribe of the Senoi nations.
