= Jeli District =

District of Kelantan, Malaysia

- District of Kelantan
- Jajahan Jeli
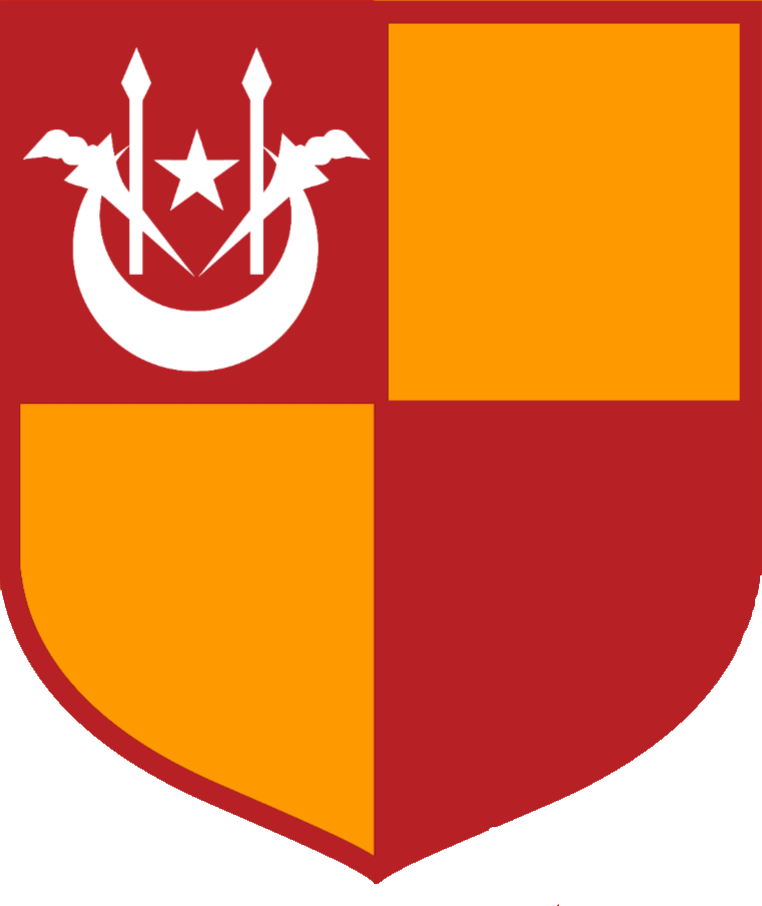
- Flag Seal Coat of arms
- Interactive map of Jeli District
- Location of Jeli District in Malaysia Jeli District (Malaysia) Jeli District (Southeast Asia)
- Coordinates: 5°42′N 101°50′E
- Country: Malaysia
- State: Kelantan
- Establishment: 1986
- Seat: Jeli
- Local area government(s): Jeli District Counci

Government
  - District officer: Nik Raisnan Bin Haji Daud
  - Administrative office: Jeli District and Land Office

Area
  - Total: 1,326 km^{2} (512 sq mi)

Population (2021)
  - Total: 55,600
  - Density: 41.9/km^{2} (109/sq mi)
- Time zone: UTC+8 (MST)
  - Summer (DST): UTC+8 (Not observed)
- Postcode: 176xx
- Calling code: +6-09
- Vehicle registration plates: D

Jeli District Council Majlis Daerah Jeli

Type
- Type: Local authority

History
- Founded: 1988

Leadership
- President: Nik Raisnan Daud
- District secretary: Wan Muhammad Hazam Wan Hassan

Meeting place
- 17600 Jeli, Kelantan Darul Naim.

Website
- mdjeli.kelantan.gov.my

Jeli is a district and a state parliamentary constituency in western Kelantan, Malaysia. As of 2010, the district's population is estimated to be 42,150. Jeli is administered by the Jeli District Council. Jeli is bordered by Perak's Hulu Perak District to the west, the Thai district of Waeng to the north, Tanah Merah District to the northeast and Kuala Krai District to the southeast.

Most people in Jeli work as rubber tappers. The rubber plantations which belong to the local people also attract people from outside to come and work. Commonly families own a small plantation of 6 acres (24,000 m^{2}) up to 50 acres (200,000 m^{2}) in size. The history of Jeli began when the government encouraged the people around Kelantan to start a great area of agriculture. This process began with a period of land clearing, or logging.

== History ==
Jeli district (jajahan) was originally an autonomous sub-district (Jajahan Kecil), formed on 1 July 1982 from parts of Tanah Merah (Jeli and Belimbing) and Kuala Krai (Kuala Balah) district. It was elevated to a full district on 1 January 1986 and made a full parliamentary constituency in the 1995 elections. Being a totally new residential area, initially Jeli had residents coming from other parts of Kelantan. Jeli became host to thousands of hopefuls from all over Kelantan during the late 70's and early 80's, hoping to get a fresh start in this district. While the first generations of Jeli residents mostly involved in rubber tapping and other forms of plantations for a living, the current generations have managed to find their way up to a much better profession, thanks to the proper education system and dedicated teachers available to this remote area.

== Population ==
Historical population
Year	Pop.	±%
1991	32,720	—
2000	35,988	+10.0%
2010	39,170	+8.8%
2020	54,656	+39.5%

Jeli as of 2009, it has a population of 46,700 people

Ranking Population of Jeli District.

Rank	Daerah/Mukim	Population 2000
1	Jeli town	17,734
2	Kuala Balah	10,198
3	Belimbing	8,056

== Federal Parliament and State Assembly Seats ==
List of LMS district representatives in the Federal Parliament (Dewan Rakyat)

Parliament	Seat Name	Member of Parliament	Party
P30	Jeli	Zahari Kechik	Perikatan Nasional (PPBM)

List of LMS district representatives in the State Legislative Assembly of Kelantan

Parliament	State	Seat Name	State Assemblyman	Party
P30	N36	Bukit Bunga	Mohamad Adhan Kechik	Barisan Nasional (UMNO)
P30	N37	Air Lanas	Kamarudin Md Nor	Perikatan Nasional (PPBM)
P30	N38	Kuala Balah	Abd Aziz Derashid	Barisan Nasional (UMNO)

== Climate ==
Batu 13 Jeli is the wettest place in Malaysia with more than 6,000 mm (240 in) of mean rainfall annually. In 2011 8,596 mm (338.4 in) of rainfall was recorded in Batu 13 Jeli, the highest annual rainfall recorded in Malaysia.

== Education ==
There are a number of schools which serve the population of Jeli. The primary schools in Jeli include Sekolah Kebangsaan Batu Melintang, Sekolah Kebangsaan Pendok, Sekolah Kebangsaan Sungai Long, Sekolah Kebangsaan Jeli 1, Sekolah Kebangsaan Kalai, Sekolah Kebangsaan Jeli 2 and Sekolah Kebangsaan Bukit Jering. Jeli also has a MARA Junior Science College, Maktab Rendah Sains MARA Jeli, which is an example of Malaysia's boarding schools. Jeli now has a new boarding school there which is SM Sains Jeli known as JeSS.

Currently, two higher learning institutions, Universiti Malaysia Kelantan and Politeknik Jeli are located here in Jeli. Politeknik Jeli is currently under construction and is scheduled to be completed in a few months. Universiti Malaysia Kelantan has been operating since 2012. Sekolah Kebangsaan Jeli (1) is one of the best school in Jeli.

== Tourism ==
The main attraction of this district is the Stong Waterfalls. Towering at a height of 305 m, this scenic waterfall is the tallest waterfall in the South East Asia region. Another attraction at Jeli is Jeli Hot Spring, one of the hottest hot springs in Malaysia. Jeli Hot Spring is located about 15 km from Jeli town. Jeli hot spring has a higher health value as it has a high sulphur content. Other attractions include Lata Janggut, Lata Renyok and Lata Chenang.

== Transportation ==
Highway 4 is the main road in the constituency, going in an east-west direction. To the west it goes to Gerik, Perak and all the way to Kedah and Penang; to the east it continues to Pasir Puteh. Jeli is therefore known as the 'western gateway' into the East Coast for visitors from Penang, Kedah and Perlis.

The junction of highways 4 and Highway 66 is located near Jeli town. Highway 66 leads to Kuala Balah in the southern part of Jeli constituency, and is a shortcut to the railway town of Dabong and Kuala Krai. City liner bus transport also provided their service through this route connected people to the nearby town
