= Blue Valley, Malaysia =

Coordinates: 4°35′20″N 101°25′0″E

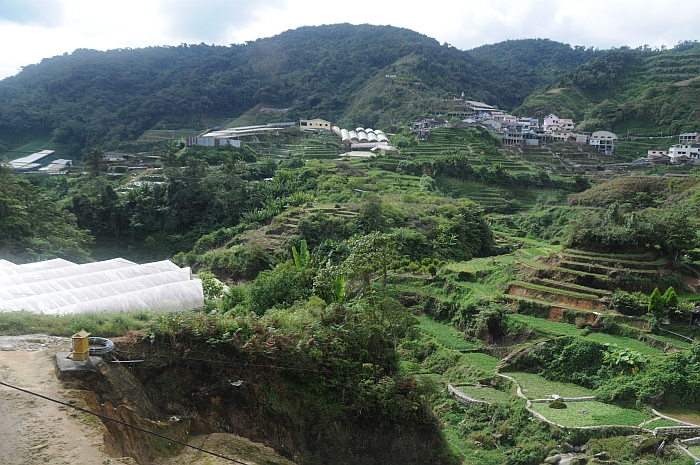
Blue Valley, Cameron Highlands, Pahang, Malaysia.

Blue Valley is a small town north of Kampung Raja, Cameron Highlands, Pahang, Malaysia. It is the site of the Blue Valley Tea Estate, a major tea plantation on the Cameron Highlands.
