= Gua Musang District =

Gua Musang District Guo Musey (Kelantan–Pattani Malay)
- District of Kelantan
- Jajahan Gua Musang
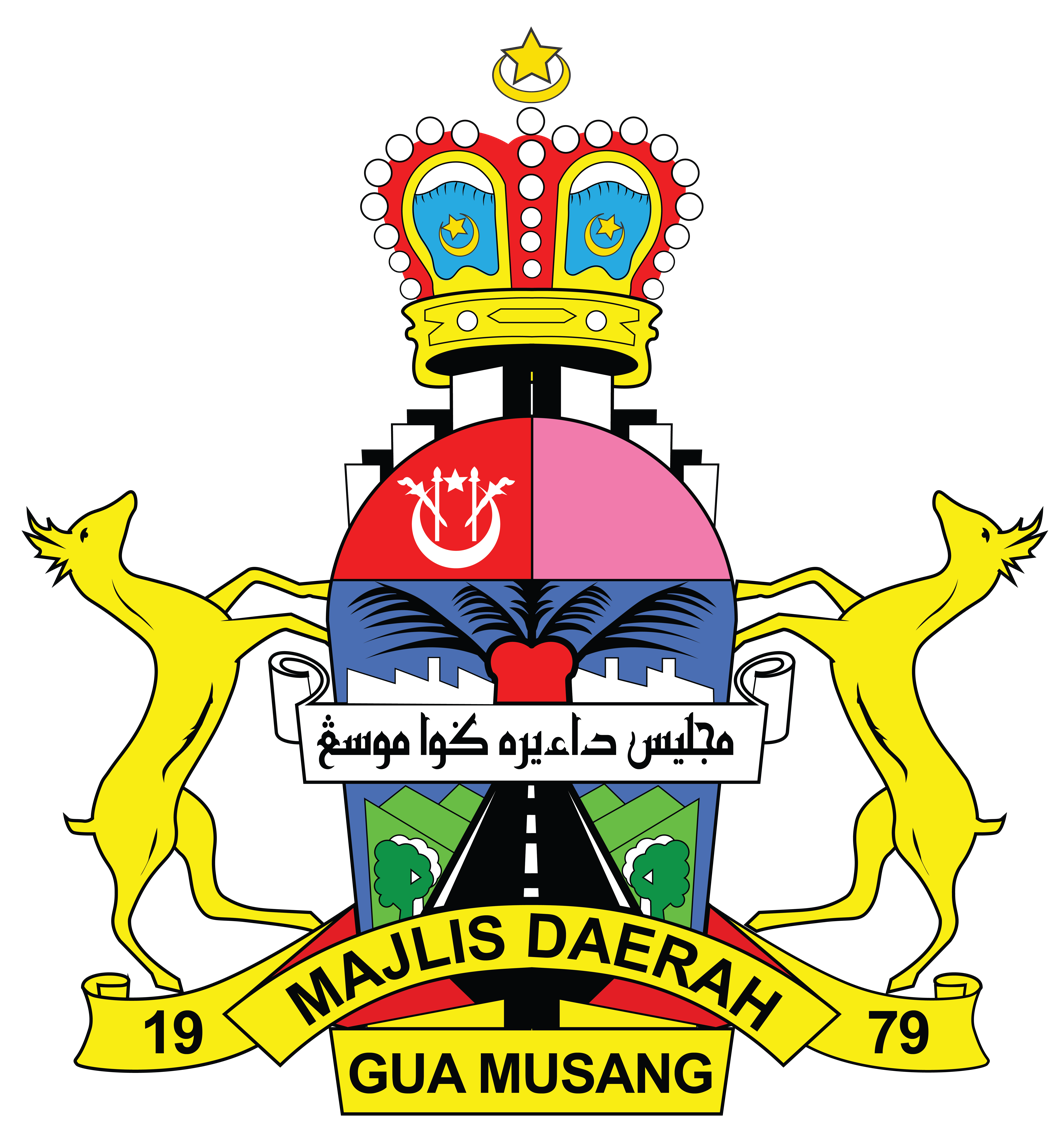
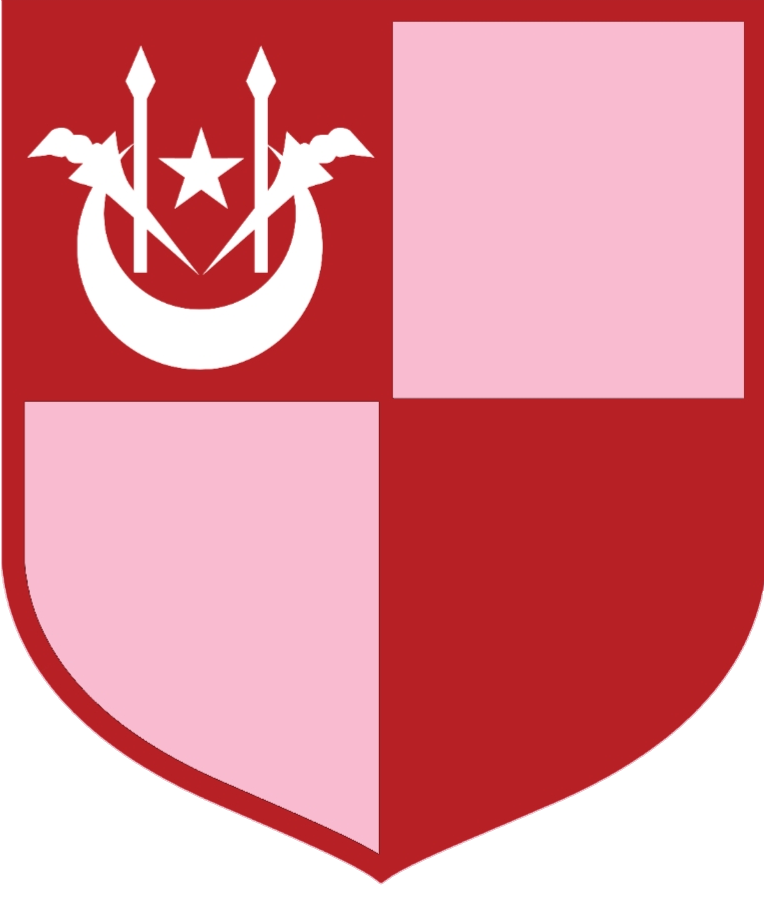
- Flag Seal Coat of arms

- Location of Gua Musang District in Kelantan
- Interactive map of Gua Musang District
- Location of Gua Musang District in Malaysia
- Coordinates: 4°53′N 101°58′E
- Country: Malaysia
- State: Kelantan
- Municipality status: January 2022 (Postpone)
- Seat: Gua Musang
- Local area government(s): Gua Musang District Council

Government
  - District officer: Haji Ab. Pattah bin Hasbullah
  - Administrative office: Gua Musang Land and District Office

Area
  - Total: 6,362 km^{2} (2,456 sq mi)

Population (2021)
  - Total: 102,500
  - Density: 16.11/km^{2} (41.73/sq mi)
- Time zone: UTC+8 (MST)
  - Summer (DST): UTC+8 (Not observed)
- Postcode: 18300
- Calling code: +6-09
- Vehicle registration plates: D

Gua Musang District Council Majlis Daerah Gua Musang مجليس دايره ڬوا موسڠ
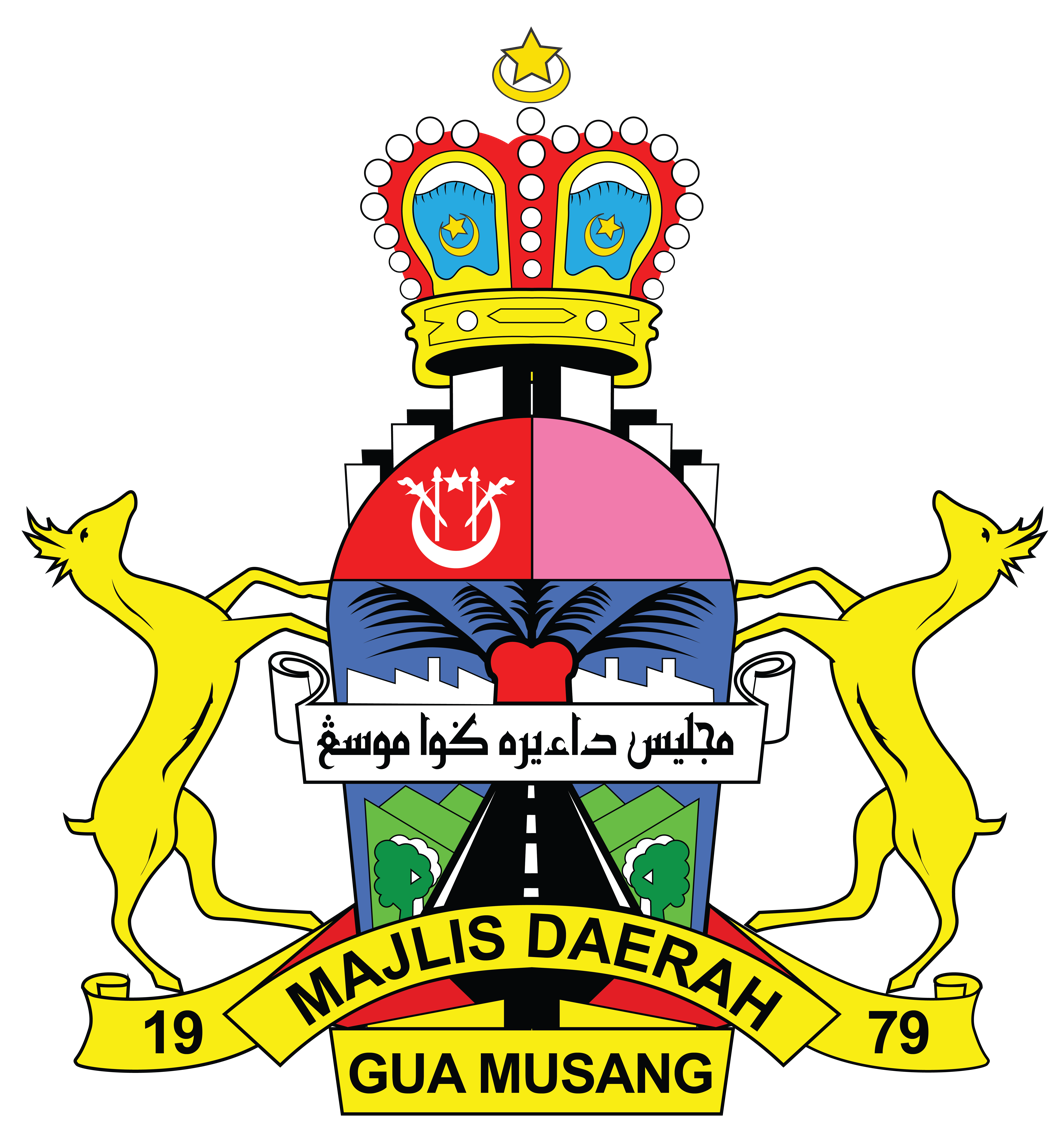

Type
- Type: Local authority

History
- Founded: 1 January 1979

Leadership
- President: Ab Pattah Hasbullah
- District secretary: Ahmad Hamdan Ubaidah

Meeting place
- 18300 Gua Musang, Kelantan Darul Naim.

Website
- mdgm.kelantan.gov.my

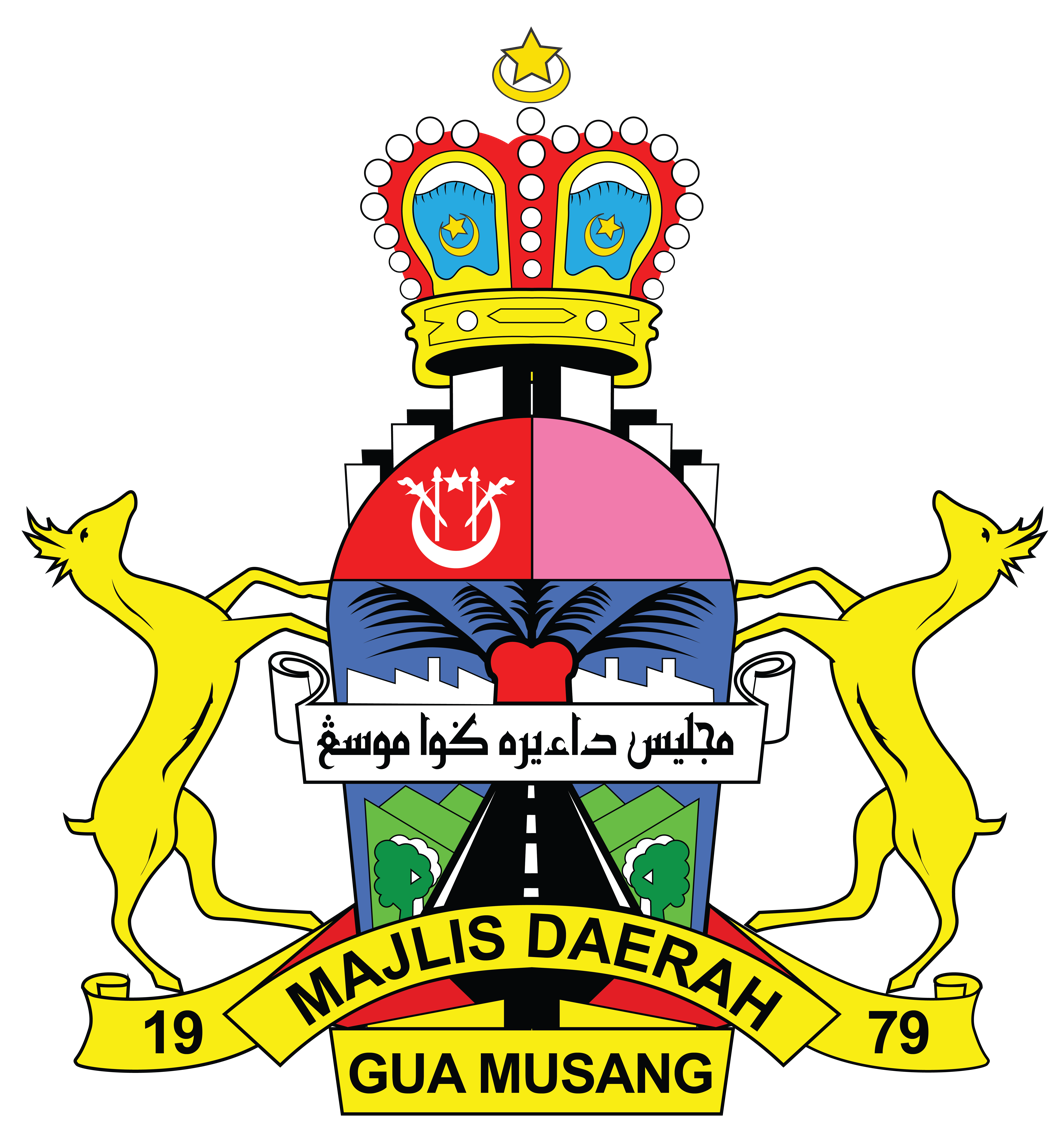
Gua Musang Town

Gua Musang (Kelantanese: Guo Musey) is a town, district and parliamentary constituency in southern Kelantan, Malaysia. It is the largest district in Kelantan. Gua Musang is administered by the Gua Musang District Council. Gua Musang district is bordered by the state of Pahang to the south, Terengganu to the east, Perak to the west and the Kelantanese districts of Kuala Krai and Jeli to the north. It is a small railway town about 140 km south of state capital Kota Bharu.

The Lojing Autonomous Sub-District (Jajahan Kecil Lojing) is in the western part of Gua Musang constituency.

Map of Gua Musang District

== Geography ==
Gua Musang literally means "Civet Cat Cave". On the eastern side of this town stands Bukit Gua Musang, a barren hill of rocks and deceptive stone-steps running 105 metres high. It stands in a commanding position, with a huge cave running into its interior and is about metres away from the other green tree-covered hills. From a distance, this hill looks like a stone pillar with a big crack which nearly splits it vertically into two equal halves. Between the hill and the town, there runs a railway track.

== Town area ==
- Bandar Lama Gua Musang
- Bandar Baru Gua Musang
- Bandar Utama Gua Musang
- FELDA Gugusan Chiku
- FELDA Gugusan Aring
- FELDA Gugusan Paloh
- Taman Saujana Harmoni
- Taman Tasik Gua Musang
- Ton Fat (TF) Gua Musang

== History ==
Before 1986, Gua Musang District was known as Ulu Kelantan (Upper Kelantan) district, as it contains smaller rivers that will later converge to form the Kelantan River. Until 1977 Ulu Kelantan also contained Kuala Krai, Dabong and Kuala Balah in Jeli.

== Transport ==
=== Car ===
Two federal routes, 8 and 185 intersect near Gua Musang. Route 8 leads to the state administrative centre of Kota Bharu northwards; while route 185 connects Simpang Pulai near Ipoh in Perak and Cameron Highlands in northwestern Pahang in the west to Kuala Jenderis and Kuala Terengganu in Hulu Terengganu in Terengganu in the east.

=== Public transport ===
Gua Musang railway station is served by the KTM Intercity Eastern Sector which runs between Tumpat (also in Kelantan) and Johor Bahru, Johor.

== Demographics ==
Historical population
Year	Pop.	±%
1991	63,816	—
2000	74,988	+17.5%
2010	86,189	+14.9%
2020	112,495	+30.5%
Figures for 2020 includes Lojing Sub-district. Source:

Gua Musang as of 2010, has a population of 90,057 people.

Ranking Population Jajahan Gua Musang.

Rank	Daerah/Mukim	Population 2000
1	Galas	31,814
2	Chiku	26,251
3	Bertam	16,923

76% of the population is ethnic Kelantanese Malays, 13% are Orang Asli (Jahai, Temiar, Mendriq and Batek), 5% Malaysian Chinese, 5% non-Malaysians and 1% Malaysian Indian.

== Federal Parliament and State Assembly Seats ==
List of LMS district representatives in the Federal Parliament (Dewan Rakyat)

Parliament	Seat Name	Member of Parliament	Party
P32	Gua Musang	Mohd Azizi Abu Naim	Independent

List of LMS district representatives in the State Legislative Assembly of Kelantan

Parliament	State	Seat Name	State Assemblyman	Party
P32	N43	Nenggiri	Mohd Azmawi Fikri Abdul Ghani	Barisan Nasional (UMNO)
P32	N44	Paloh	Shaari Mat Hussain	Perikatan Nasional (BERSATU)
P32	N45	Galas	Mohd Syahbuddin Hashim	Barisan Nasional (UMNO)

== Folklore ==
It was believed that long ago this town was inhabited by some superstitious hunters who made offerings of animals in front of the cave of Bukit Gua Musang. One afternoon a raging storm broke out and the huts of the hunters were destroyed. At the height of the storm a bolt of lightning struck the summit of the hill and nearly split it in two. The hunters, believing that the God of the Cave was angry with them, knelt down and began to pray. As they were praying they saw a huge pack of Civet Cats (or Musang in Malay) running into the cave. At once, they seized their bows and arrows and lay in wait for the foxes. They waited the whole evening but the foxes did not emerge, not even when the storm had stopped. From then on, the inhabitants called the cave Gua Musang.

A month after this strange event, seven young hunters climbed the hill but only one came back alive. He told the villagers that when he and his six companions were halfway up the hill, a length of stone staircase appeared before them. They climbed the staircase and upon reaching the summit they found a tree, under which, stood a bowl of pure water. The young men, with the exception of one, drank the water in the bowl to quench their thirst. Before the others could persuade him to drink, the bowl vanished. They grew afraid and quickly began to descend. Suddenly a blood-chilling cry was heard. The hunter turned quickly but it was too late! His six friends had disappeared from sight. He rushed down the slope but there was no sign of any dead bodies at the bottom of the hill.

He concluded that the "God of the Cave" had taken his friends and had spared him because he had not drunk the water in the bowl. Most of the villagers did not believe the young man's story. They were sure that the other six must have slipped and fallen, but the bodies of the missing hunters were never found.

== Places of interest ==
Gua Musang is close to the northern gateway to Taman Negara, which is at Sungai Relau near Merapoh in Pahang. The small village of Merapoh is just south of Gua Musang and serves as a popular starting point for those who want to scale Gunung Tahan, the highest mountain in the Malay Peninsula. The untouched tropical rainforest in Taman Negara is among the oldest in the world. It is well known for its biodiversity and is home to many endangered species of animals and plants.

Gua Musang is karstic in nature, surrounded by numerous limestone hills and caves, which have become popular among the caving and rock climbing communities.

Another interesting place to visit in Gua Musang is a Buddhist temple in Pulai, which is purportedly 600 years old.

The Nenggiri River is a favourite among those who enjoy river rafting. There is also a rafting race, called Nenggiri Challenge. Archaeological sites from the Neolithic age can be found in caves, such as Gua Cha, Chawan and Jaya, which are situated along the river.

Gua Musang is the original home of the Musang King (Mao Shan Wang) cultivar of the durian, which is extremely popular through Malaysia and Singapore and is known as the "King of Durians".

The newest interest places in Gua Musang are Masjid Buluh Gua Musang; a mosque built entirely from bamboo, and newly built Masjid Razaleigh (as known as Al-Haram Al-Ghari, Arabic: الحرم الغاري); a new mosque resembling the Grand Mosque of Mecca. Both of them are located in the Old Town (Bandar Lama) of Gua Musang.

== Education ==
=== Primary School in Gua Musang District ===
- Sekolah Kebangsaan Tohoi
- Sekolah Kebangsaan Tengku Muhammad Fakhry Petra
- Sekolah Kebangsaan Sungai Terah
- Sekolah Kebangsaan Star
- Sekolah Kebangsaan Sri Wangi
- Sekolah Kebangsaan Sri Permai (JHEOA)
- Sekolah Kebangsaan Sri Chiku (2)
- Sekolah Kebangsaan Sri Chiku
- Sekolah Kebangsaan Renok Baru
- Sekolah Kebangsaan Pulat
- Sekolah Kebangsaan Pos Brooke
- Sekolah Kebangsaan Perasu
- Sekolah Kebangsaan Pasir Tumbuh
- Sekolah Kebangsaan Pasir Linggi
- Sekolah Kebangsaan Paloh Tiga
- Sekolah Kebangsaan Paloh 1 & 2
- Sekolah Kebangsaan Meranto
- Sekolah Kebangsaan Limau Kasturi 2
- Sekolah Kebangsaan Limau Kasturi 1
- Sekolah Kebangsaan Lepan JayaSK Kuala Sungai
- Sekolah Kebangsaan Kuala Lah
- Sekolah Kebangsaan Kuala Betis
- Sekolah Kebangsaan Jerek
- Sekolah Kebangsaan Jeram Tekoh
- Sekolah Kebangsaan Hendrop
- Sekolah Kebangsaan Gua Musang
- Sekolah Kebangsaan Ciku Tiga
- Sekolah Kebangsaan Chiku 7
- Sekolah Kebangsaan Blau
- Sekolah Kebangsaan Bihai
- Sekolah Kebangsaan Bertam
- Sekolah Kebangsaan Balar
- Sekolah Kebangsaan Aring
- Sekolah Jenis Kebangsaan (Cina) Gua Musang

=== Secondary School in Gua Musang District ===
- Sekolah Menengah Kebangsaan Tengku Indra Petra 1
- Sekolah Menengah Kebangsaan Tengku Indra Petra 2
- Sekolah Menengah Kebangsaan Sungai Asap
- Sekolah Menengah Kebangsaan Paloh
- Sekolah Menengah Kebangsaan Tengku Bendaraha
- Sekolah Menengah Kebangsaan Chiku 2
- Sekolah Menengah Kebangsaan Bandar Chiku
- Sekolah Menengah Sains Gua Musang

== Shopping ==
- Pasaraya Econjaya Gua Musang
- Tunas Manja Supermarket, Bandar Utama
- Pasaraya KU
- Pasaraya Sakan
- Gedung Ten Ten
- Pasaraya Ra
- BS Freshmart Gua Musang
- ECO Shop
- ECO+ Shop
- G-Orange Mall Gua Musang
