= Dabong =

Town in Kelantan, Malaysia

- Town
- Interactive map of Dabong
- Dabong in Kelantan Dabong (Malaysia) Dabong (Southeast Asia)
- Coordinates: 5°22′36.84″N 102°0′35.28″E
- Country: Malaysia
- State: Kelantan
- District: Kuala Krai

Government
  - Type: District council
  - Body: Dabong District Council

Population (2010)
  - Total: 40,659
- Time zone: UTC+8 (MST)
- Postal code: 18200
- Area code(s): 09-9xxxxxxx
- Vehicle registration: D

Dabong District Council Majlis Daerah Dabong مجليس دايره دابوڠ

Type
- Type: Local authority

History
- Founded: 1 January 1979

Leadership
- President: Mohd Hariff Ghazali
- District secretary: Mohd Fadzil Adnan Abdul Aziz

Motto
- Ikhlas Terus Maju (Sincere, Ever Onward)

Meeting place
- 18200 Dabong, Kelantan Darul Naim.

Website
- mddabong.kelantan.gov.my

Dabong, also known as Kuala Krai Selatan, is a small town in Kuala Krai District, Kelantan, Malaysia. It has a railway station. The famous Gua Ikan (Fish Cave) is situated nearby on the Galas River. The town is located approximately 155km from the state capital, Kota Bharu.

Dabong is one out of four state seats in the Kuala Krai constituency.

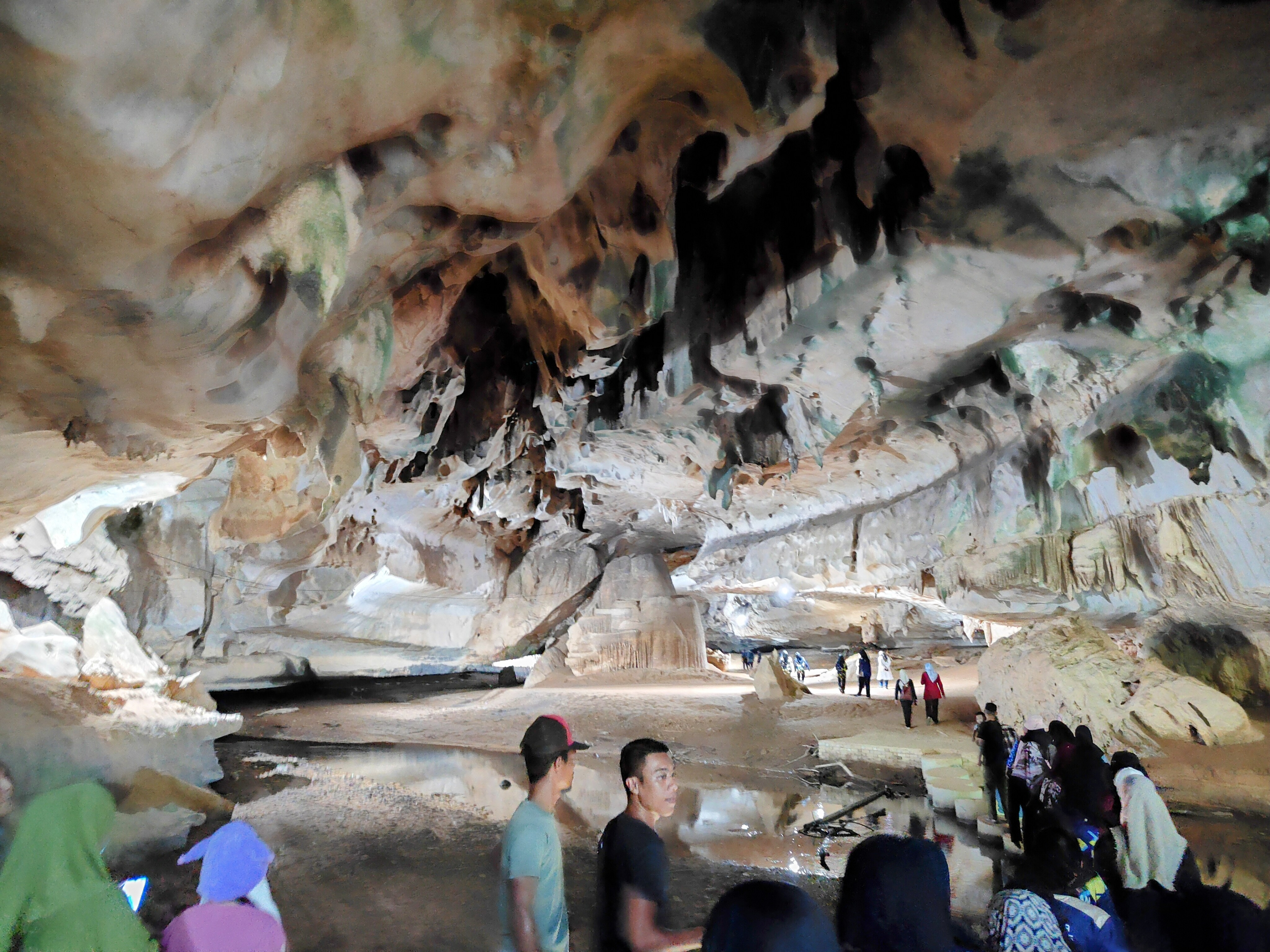
The interior of Gua Ikan, a cave and tourist attraction in Dabong.

== Education ==
=== Primary school ===
- Sekolah Kebangsaan Mempelam Jelawang
- Sekolah Kebangsaan Kuala Geris
- Sekolah Kebangsaan Kemubu
- Sekolah Kebangsaan Dabong
- Sekolah Kebangsaan Biak
- Sekolah Kebangsaan Sri Mahligai

=== Secondary school ===
- Sekolah Menengah Kebangsaan Dabong
