= Malaysia Federal Route 209 =

Road in Malaysia

Federal Route 209
- Jalan Pasir Hor

Route information
- Length: 4.22 km (2.62 mi)

Major junctions
- Southwest end: Wakaf Che Yeh
- FT 207 Federal Route 207; FT 8 Federal Route 8 FT 3 AH18 Wakaf Bharu-Kota Bharu-Kubang Kerian Highway; FT 131 Jalan Raja Perempuan Zainab II
- Northeast end: Kubang Kerian

Location
- Country: Malaysia
- Primary destinations: Pasir Hor

Highway system
- Highways in Malaysia; Expressways; Federal; State

Federal Route 209, or Jalan Pasir Hor (formerly Kelantan State Route D3), is a federal road in Kelantan, Malaysia. The road connects Wakaf Che Yeh in the west to Kubang Kerian in the east.

== Features ==
At most sections, the Federal Route 209 was built under the JKR R5 road standard, allowing maximum speed limit of up to 90 km/h.

== List of junctions and towns ==
Km	Exit	Junctions	To	Remarks
		Wakaf Che Yeh	North; FT 8 Kota Bharu West; FT 207 Salor; FT 207 Pasir Mas South; FT 8 Gua Musang; FT 8 Kuala Krai; FT 8 Machang	Junctions
		Kampung Padang Enggang		
		Kampung Surau Padang Enggang		
		Kampung Tini		
		Kampung Jaya		
		Kampung Pasir Lada		
		Pasir Hor		
		Sungai Pengkalan Datu bridge		
		Kubang Kerian; Wakaf Bharu-Kota Bharu-Kubang Kerian Highway	FT 3 AH18 Wakaf Bharu-Kota Bharu-Kubang Kerian Highway Northwest; FT 3 AH18 Kota Bharu; FT 57 Pengkalan Chepa Southeast; FT 211 Bachok; FT 3 AH18 Pasir Puteh; FT 3 AH18 Besut; FT 3 AH18 Kuala Terengganu	Diamond interchange
		Kubang Kerian		
		Kubang Kerian; Jalan Raja Perempuan Zainab II	FT 131 Jalan Raja Perempuan Zainab II North; FT 187 Sabak; FT 57 Pengkalan Chepa; FT 57 Sultan Ismail Petra Airport; FT 131 Pantai Sabak South; FT 211 Bachok; FT 3 AH18 Pasir Puteh; FT 3 AH18 Besut; FT 3 AH18 Kuala Terengganu; Universiti Sains Malaysia (USM) Kubang Kerian Campus	T-junctions
