= Wakaf Bharu–Kota Bharu–Kubang Kerian Highway =

Road in Malaysia

Federal Route 3
- Wakaf Bharu–Kota Bharu–Kubang Kerian Highway (WKK Highway)

Route information
- Part of AH18
- Maintained by Malaysian Public Works Department
- Existed: 2008–present
- History: Completed in 2012

Major junctions
- Northwest end: Wakaf Bharu (East); Pasir Pekan
- FT 134 Jalan Pengkalan Kubur; FT 8 Federal Route 8 FT 57 Jalan Long Yunus; FT 209 Jalan Pasir Hor; FT 131 Jalan Raja Perempuan Zainab II; FT 211 Jalan Kubang Kerian-Bachok
- Southeast end: Kubang Kerian

Location
- Country: Malaysia
- Primary destinations: Kota Bharu

Highway system
- Highways in Malaysia; Expressways; Federal; State

Wakaf Bharu–Kota Bharu–Kubang Kerian Highway or WKK Highway (Lebuhraya WKK), Federal Route 3, is a major highway in Kota Bharu, Kelantan, Malaysia.

Kota Bharu flyover is the first flyover built in Kota Bharu. It was constructed between 2009 and 2012.

== Junction lists ==
The entire route is located in Kota Bharu District, Kelantan.

Legend:

- I/C - Interchange, I/S - Intersection, RSA - Rest and service area, OBR - Overhead bridge restaurant, R/R - Restaurant and rest plaza, L/B - Layby, V/P - Vista point, TN - tunnel, T/P - Toll plaza, BR - Bridge
- C - Cloverleaf, S - Stack, T-A - Trumpet-A, T-B - Trumpet-B, DT - Directional-T/Y, SDT - Semi-Directional-T/Y, P-Y - Partial-Y, D - Diamond, P-C - Partial cloverleaf, D-D - Diverging diamond, D-R - Direct ramp

Location	km	mi	Exit	Name	Destinations	Notes
Wakaf Bharu			Through to FT 3 / AH18 Malaysia Federal Route 3			
Wakaf Bharu				Wakaf Bharu (East); Pasir Pekan; Pasir Pekan Roundabout	FT 134 Jalan Pengkalan Kubur – Wakaf Bharu, Tumpat, Pengkalan Kubur	Roundabout
Kota Bharu			Sungai Kelantan Bridge; Sultan Yahya Petra Bridge			
Kota Bharu				Kota Bharu flyover Kota Bharu; Jalan Hamzah Exit	Below flyover Jalan Kota Bharu–Pengkalan Kubor – Jalan Hamzah, Lembah Sireh, Town Centre, Kuala Krai, Pantai Cahaya Bulan (Pantai Cinta Berahi)	Start/End of flyover
Kota Bharu				Kota Bharu flyover Kota Bharu; Jalan Sultanah Zainab I/C	Below flyover Jalan Sultanah Zainab – Town Centre, Pantai Cahaya Bulan (Pantai Cinta Berahi), Pintu Geng, Kota Darul Naim	Junctions
Kota Bharu				Kota Bharu flyover Kota Bharu; Jalan Sultan Ibrahim I/C	Below flyover Jalan Sultan Ibrahim – Town Centre, Pantai Cahaya Bulan (Pantai Cinta Berahi); FT 8 Jalan Kuala Krai – Ketereh, Machang, Kuala Krai, Gua Musang, Kuala Lipis	Junctions
Kota Bharu				Kota Bharu flyover Kota Bharu; Town Centre Exit	Below Flyover; Jalan Sultan Yahya Petra – Lembah Sireh, Town Centre, Kuala Krai, Pantai Cahaya Bulan (Pantai Cinta Berahi)	Start/End of flyover
Kota Bharu				Kota Bharu; Langgar Exit	Jalan Dusun Muda; Jalan Langgar – Kelantan Royal Mausoleum	Kuala Terengganu bound
Kota Bharu				Kota Bharu; Jalan Long Yunus I/S	FT 57 Jalan Long Yunus – Pengkalan Chepa, Sultan Ismail Petra Airport	Junctions
Kota Bharu				Jalan Dato Lundang I/S	D109 Jalan Dato Lundang – Pengkalan Chepa, Sultan Ismail Petra Airport	Junctions
Kota Bharu				Jalan Pasir Hor I/S	FT 209 Jalan Pasir Hor – Kubang Kerian, Pasir Hor, Wakaf Che Yeh	Diamond interchange
Kubang Kerian				Kubang Kerian; Kubang Kerian I/S	FT 131 Jalan Raja Perempuan Zainab II – Sabak, Pengkalan Chepa, Sultan Ismail Petra Airport, Universiti Sains Malaysia (USM) Kubang Kerian Campus, Pantai Sabak; FT 211 Jalan Kubang Kerian-bachok – Binjai, Bachok	Junctions
Kubang Kerian			Through to FT 3 / AH18 Malaysia Federal Route 3			
1.000 mi = 1.609 km; 1.000 km = 0.621 mi: Incomplete access
