= Malaysia Federal Route 131 =

Road in Malaysia

Federal Route 131
- Jalan Raja Perempuan Zainab II

Route information
- Length: 10.98 km (6.82 mi)

Major junctions
- North end: Pantai Sabak
- FT 57 Jalan Pengkalan Chepa; FT 187 Jalan Sabak; FT 209 Jalan Pasir Hor; FT 3 AH18 Wakaf Bharu-Kota Bharu-Kubang Kerian Highway; FT 3 AH18 Federal Route 3 FT 211 Jalan Kubang Kerian-Bachok
- South end: Kubang Kerian

Location
- Country: Malaysia
- Primary destinations: Pengkalan Chepa

Highway system
- Highways in Malaysia; Expressways; Federal; State

Federal Route 131, or Jalan Raja Perempuan Zainab II, is a federal road in Kelantan, Malaysia. It is also a main route to the Universiti Sains Malaysia (USM) Kubang Kerian Campus. The Kilometre Zero of the Federal Route 131 starts at Pantai Sabak.

== Features ==
At most sections, the Federal Route 131 was built under the JKR R5 road standard, with a speed limit of 90 km/h.

== List of junctions and towns ==
Km	Exit	Junctions	To	Remarks
		Pantai Sabak	Pantai Sabak; V Historical Pantai Sabak Bunker (Defence bunker during first Japanese Invasion of Malaya)	Historical site
FT 131; 0		Pantai Sabak; Jalan Pengkalan Chepa	West; FT 57 Jalan Pengkalan Chepa; Pengkalan Chepa; Kota Bharu; Sultan Ismail Petra Airport East; FT 187 Jalan Sabak; Sabak	T-junctions
		Kelantan Golf and Country Club		
		Kawasan Perindustrian Mara		
		Kampung Panchor		
		Panji	West; D6 Jalan Panji; Panji; Kota Bharu	T-junctions
		Jalan Hospital	West; D106 Jalan Hospital; Tapang; Kota Bharu	T-junctions
		Kampung Pulau Kapas		
		Kampung Darat Demit	West; D108 Jalan Gucil Bayam; Guchil Bayam; Kota Bharu	T-junctions
		Kubang Kerian; Jalan Pasir Hor	West; FT 209 Jalan Pasir Hor; Pasir Hor; Wakaf Che Yeh	T-junctions
		Hospital Universiti Sains Malaysia (HUSM) Kubang Kerian	Hospital Universiti Sains Malaysia (HUSM) Kubang Kerian	
		Universiti Sains Malaysia (USM) Kubang Kerian Campus	Universiti Sains Malaysia (USM) Kubang Kerian Campus	
		Kubang Kerian	Northwest; FT 3 AH18 Wakaf Bharu-Kota Bharu-Kubang Kerian Highway; FT 3 AH18 Kota Bharu; FT 134 Wakaf Bharu; FT 3 AH18 Pasir Mas; FT 3 AH18 Rantau Panjang South; FT 3 AH18 Pasir Puteh; FT 3 AH18 Besut; FT 3 AH18 Kuala Terengganu East; FT 211 Jalan Kubang Kerian-Bachok; Binjai; Bachok	T-junctions
