= APFT =

APFT may refer to:

- The Asia Pacific Flight Training Academy in Kota Bharu, Kelantan, Malaysia
- The United States Army Physical Fitness Test, designed to test the muscular strength, endurance, and cardiovascular respiratory physical fitness of soldiers.
