= Malaysia Federal Route 187 =

Road in Malaysia

Federal Route 187
- Jalan Sabak

Route information
- Length: 3.29 km (2.04 mi)

Major junctions
- West end: Pantai Sabak
- FT 57 Jalan Pengkalan Chepa; FT 131 Jalan Raja Perempuan Zainab II
- East end: Kubang Kerian

Location
- Country: Malaysia
- Primary destinations: Pengkalan Chepa; Sabak

Highway system
- Highways in Malaysia; Expressways; Federal; State

Jalan Sabak, Federal Route 187, is a federal road in Kelantan, Malaysia.

At most sections, the Federal Route 187 was built under the JKR R5 road standard, with a speed limit of 90 km/h.

== List of junctions and towns ==
Km	Exit	Junctions	To	Remarks
		Pantai Sabak; Jalan Raja Perempuan Zainab II	FT 131 Jalan Raja Perempuan Zainab II North; FT 131 Pantai Sabak South; FT 131 Kubang Kerian; FT 3 AH18 Kuala Terengganu West; FT 57 Jalan Pengkalan Chepa; Pengkalan Chepa; Kota Bharu; Sultan Ismail Petra Airport	T-junctions
		Sungai Raja Gail bridge		
		Sekolah Kebangsaan Sabak		
		Sabak		
		Kampung Pulau Gajah		
		Kubang Kerian		
