= Wakaf Bharu railway station =

Railway station in Wakaf Bharu, Malaysia

Wakaf Bharu

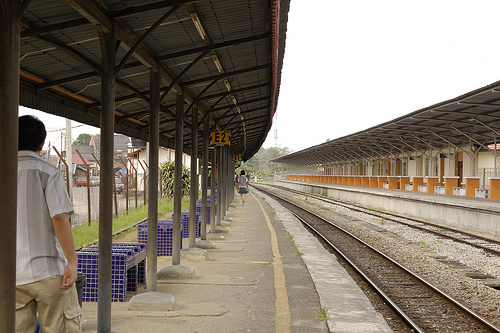
- Wakaf Bharu station in 2012

General information
- Other names: Malay: وقف بارو (Jawi); Chinese: 华卡峇鲁; Tamil: வாக்காப் பாரு
- Location: Wakaf Bharu, Tumpat District; Kelantan; Malaysia
- Coordinates: 6.118422°N 102.200918°E
- Owner: Railway Assets Corporation
- Operator: Keretapi Tanah Melayu
- Line: East Coast Line
- Platforms: 1 side platform 1 island platform
- Tracks: 3

Construction
- Structure type: At-grade
- Parking: Available, free.
- Accessible: Yes

Services
Preceding station	Keretapi Tanah Melayu (Intercity)	Following station
Tumpat Terminus	Ekspres Rakyat Timuran	Pasir Mas towards Johor Bahru Sentral
Tumpat Terminus	Shuttle Timur	Bunut Susu Halt towards Kuala Lipis
Kampung Kok Pasir Halt towards Tumpat	Shuttle Timur	Bunut Susu Halt towards Gua Musang
Kampung Kok Pasir Halt towards Tumpat	Shuttle Timur	Bunut Susu Halt towards Dabong
Location

Wakaf Bharu railway station is a Malaysian railway station located at and named after the town of Wakaf Bharu in the Tumpat District of the state of Kelantan. It is commonly used to access the nearby town of Kota Bharu, the state capital of Kelantan.

The station has two platforms, with only one being operational, and includes facilities like toilets and shops.

== Train services ==
The station is served by the following KTM Intercity services:

- Ekspres Rakyat Timuran 26/27 Tumpat–JB Sentral
- Shuttle Timur 52/53/57/58 Tumpat–Gua Musang
- Shuttle Timur 55/56 Tumpat–Dabong
- Shuttle Timur 51/60 Tumpat–Kuala Lipis

== Around the station ==
- Malaysia Federal Route 134
