= Malaysia Federal Route 57 =

Road in Malaysia

Federal Route 57
- Jalan Long Yunus; Jalan Pengkalan Chepa (Jalan Tok Guru)

Route information
- Maintained by Malaysian Public Works Department
- Length: 9.7 km (6.0 mi)

Major junctions
- Southwest end: Kota Bharu
- FT 3 / AH18 Wakaf Bharu–Kota Bharu–Kubang Kerian Highway; FT 223 Federal Route 223; FT 3739 Federal Route 3739; FT 131 Federal Route 131; FT 187 Federal Route 187
- Northeast end: Pantai Sabak

Location
- Country: Malaysia
- Primary destinations: Pengkalan Chepa, Sultan Ismail Petra Airport, Pantai Sabak

Highway system
- Highways in Malaysia; Expressways; Federal; State

Federal Route 57 comprising Jalan Long Yunus and Jalan Pengkalan Chepa (now Jalan Tok Guru) is a federal road in Kelantan, Malaysia. It is a main route to Sultan Ismail Petra Airport at Pengkalan Chepa.

== Features ==
At most sections, the Federal Route 57 was built under the JKR R5 road standard, allowing maximum speed limit of up to 90 km/h (56 mph).

== Junction lists ==
The entire route is located in Kota Bharu District, Kelantan.

Legend:

- I/C - Interchange, I/S - Intersection, RSA - Rest and service area, OBR - Overhead bridge restaurant, R/R - Restaurant and rest plaza, L/B - Layby, V/P - Vista point, TN - tunnel, T/P - Toll plaza, BR - Bridge
- C - Cloverleaf, S - Stack, T-A - Trumpet-A, T-B - Trumpet-B, DT - Directional-T/Y, SDT - Semi-Directional-T/Y, P-Y - Partial-Y, D - Diamond, P-C - Partial cloverleaf, D-D - Diverging diamond, D-R - Direct ramp

Location	km	mi	Exit	Name	Destinations	Notes
Kota Bharu			5708	Kota Bharu; Wakaf Bharu–Kota Bharu–Kubang Kerian Highway	FT 3 / AH18 Wakaf Bharu–Kota Bharu–Kubang Kerian Highway – Town Centre, Wakaf Bharu, Pasir Mas, Rantau Panjang, Kubang Kerian, Pasir Puteh, Besut, Kuala Terengganu	Junctions
Kota Bharu				Kampung Kubang Bunut		
Kota Bharu			Sungai Baung bridge			
Kota Bharu			5707	Kota Bharu; Jalan Guchil Bayam	D108 Jalan Guchil Bayam – Langgar, Town Centre, Federal Building, Istana Jahar, Muhammadi Mosque, Siti Khadijah Market, Kelantan Royal Mausoleum, Guchil Bayam, Kubang Kerian	Junctions
Kota Bharu				Kota Bharu; Jalan Abdul Kadir Adabi	D106 Jalan Abdul Kadir Adabi – Town Centre, Kota Bharu Hospital, Istana Jahar, Muhammadi Mosque, Siti Khadijah Market, Tapang, Kubang Kerian	Junctions
Kota Bharu				Kota Bharu Fire Station		
Kota Bharu			5706	Kota Bharu; Simpang Long Yunus	FT 223 Malaysia Federal Route 223 – Wakaf Mek Zainab, Pantai Cahaya Bulan (Pantai Cinta Berahi); D2 Jalan Tok Guru – Town Centre, Kota Bharu Hospital, Istana Jahar, Muhammadi Mosque, Siti Khadijah Market	Junctions
Pengkalan Chepa				Maahad Muhammadi Lelaki		
Pengkalan Chepa			5705	Jalan Tanjong Mas	D6 Jalan Tanjong Mas – Panji	T-junctions
Pengkalan Chepa			Sungai Baong bridge			
Pengkalan Chepa			5704	Jalan Chekok	D105 Jalan Chekok – Chekok	T-junctions
Pengkalan Chepa			Sungai Alor Lintah bridge			
Pengkalan Chepa			5703	Pengkalan Chepa; Jalan Maktab	FT 3739 Jalan Maktab – Pekan Pengkalan Chepa, Pengkalan Chepa Prison, Institut Perguruan Guru Kota Bharu, Kolej Vokasional Pengkalan Chepa	T-junctions
Pengkalan Chepa				Landing lights		
Pengkalan Chepa				Battalion 21 Army Camp		
Pengkalan Chepa				Kem 8 Brigade Army Camp		
Pengkalan Chepa			5702	Pengkalan Chepa; Sultan Ismail Petra Airport	Sultan Ismail Petra Airport – Arrival/Departure	T-junctions
Pantai Sabak				Kampung Parang Puting		
Pantai Sabak			5701	Pantai Sabak; Jalan Raja Perempuan Zainab II	FT 131 Malaysia Federal Route 131 – Pantai Sabak, Kubang Kerian, Kuala Terengganu; FT 187 Malaysia Federal Route 187 – Sabak	T-junctions
1.000 mi = 1.609 km; 1.000 km = 0.621 mi
