= Tumpat District =

Tumpat District Ttupak (Kelantan–Pattani Malay)
- District of Kelantan
- Jajahan Tumpat
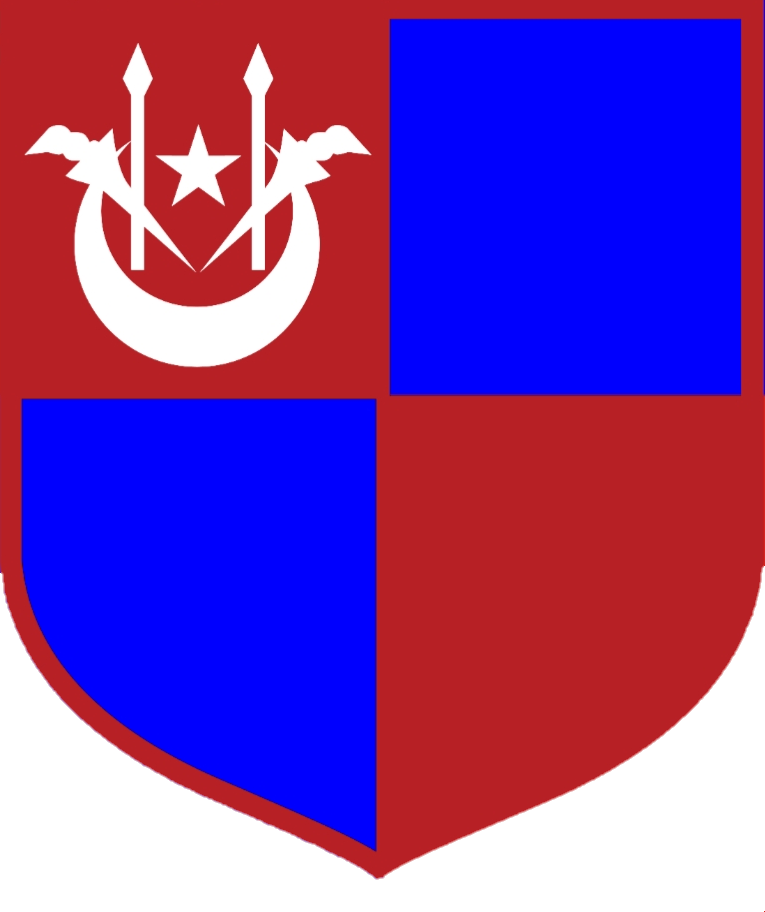
- Flag Coat of arms

- Location of Tumpat District in Kelantan
- Interactive map of Tumpat District
- Location of Tumpat District in Malaysia
- Coordinates: 6°10′N 102°10′E
- Country: Malaysia
- State: Kelantan
- Established: 1 January 1949
- Seat: Tumpat
- Local area government(s): Tumpat District Council

Government
  - District officer: Mohamad Nazwan Bin Ismail
  - Administrative office: Tumpat District and Land Office

Area
  - Total: 181 km^{2} (70 sq mi)

Population (2023)
  - Total: 186,300
  - Density: 1,030/km^{2} (2,670/sq mi)
- Time zone: UTC+8 (MST)
  - Summer (DST): UTC+8 (Not observed)
- Postcode: 16xxx
- Calling code: +6-09
- Vehicle registration plates: D

Tumpat District Council Majlis Daerah Tumpat
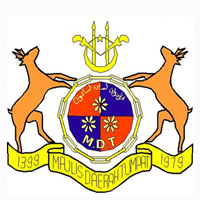

History
- Founded: 1 January 1979

Leadership
- President: Mohamad Nazwan Bin Ismail
- District Secretary: Mohd Rosli Mohamed

Meeting place
- Jalan Tanjung Kuala, 16200 Tumpat, Kelantan Darul Naim

Website
- mdtumpat.kelantan.gov.my

Tumpat (Kelantanese: Ttupak) is a town, a district (jajahan) and parliamentary constituency in northern Kelantan, Malaysia, at the mouth of Kelantan River.

Tumpat is situated at the end of the East Coast Line railway line operated by Keretapi Tanah Melayu (Malayan Railways) which links Kelantan to the southern and western part of Peninsular Malaysia. This strategic location makes it a transportation hub of Kelantan. Tumpat town is approximately 15 km from the state capital, Kota Bharu.

== History ==
Tumpat district was established on 1 January 1949, detaching from Kota Bharu metropolitan area.

Map of Tumpat District

== Geography ==
Tumpat is the northernmost constituency in Kelantan, bordering Thailand across the Golok River to the west, Kota Bharu across the Kelantan River to the east, and Pasir Mas to the south, and the Thai district of Tak Bai to the west.

== Demographics ==
Historical population
Year	Pop.	±%
1991	116,044	—
2000	130,414	+12.4%
2010	147,179	+12.9%
2020	179,943	+22.3%

Tumpat has a population about 152,168 (2010), with the majority being the Malays with significant Siamese, Indian and Chinese population.

Generally in Kelantan, the populations of Malaysian Indians are low but Tumpat is known to be the area where most Indians reside in Kelantan. During any Indian festivals, Indians around Kelantan gather there for community celebration events like Ponggal, Thaipusam & Deepavali.

Ranking Population of Jajahan Tumpat:

Rank	Daerah/Mukim	Population 2000
1	Wakaf Bharu	29,902
2	Pengkalan Kubur	20,642
3	Tumpat	19,896
4	Sungai Pinang	16,622
5	Terbak	16,096
6	Kebakat	14,663
7	Jalan Besar	12,595
8	Palekbang	
9	Kelaboran	
10	Kampung Laut	
11	Kok Keli	
12	Berangan	
13	Bunohan	
14	Geting	
15	Morak	
16	Pasir Pekan	

== Federal Parliament and State Assembly Seats ==
List of LMS district representatives in the Federal Parliament (Dewan Rakyat)

Parliament	Seat Name	Member of Parliament	Party
P19	Tumpat	Mumtaz Md. Nawi	Perikatan Nasional (PAS)

List of LMS district representatives in the State Legislative Assembly of Kelantan

Parliament	State	Seat Name	State Assemblyman	Party
P19	N01	Pengkalan Kubor	Wan Roslan Wan Hamat	Perikatan Nasional (PAS)
P19	N02	Kelaboran	Mohd Adanan Hassan	Perikatan Nasional (PAS)
P19	N03	Pasir Pekan	Ahmad Yakob	Perikatan Nasional (PAS)
P19	N04	Wakaf Bharu	Mohd Rusli Abdullah	Perikatan Nasional (PAS)

== Tourist attractions ==
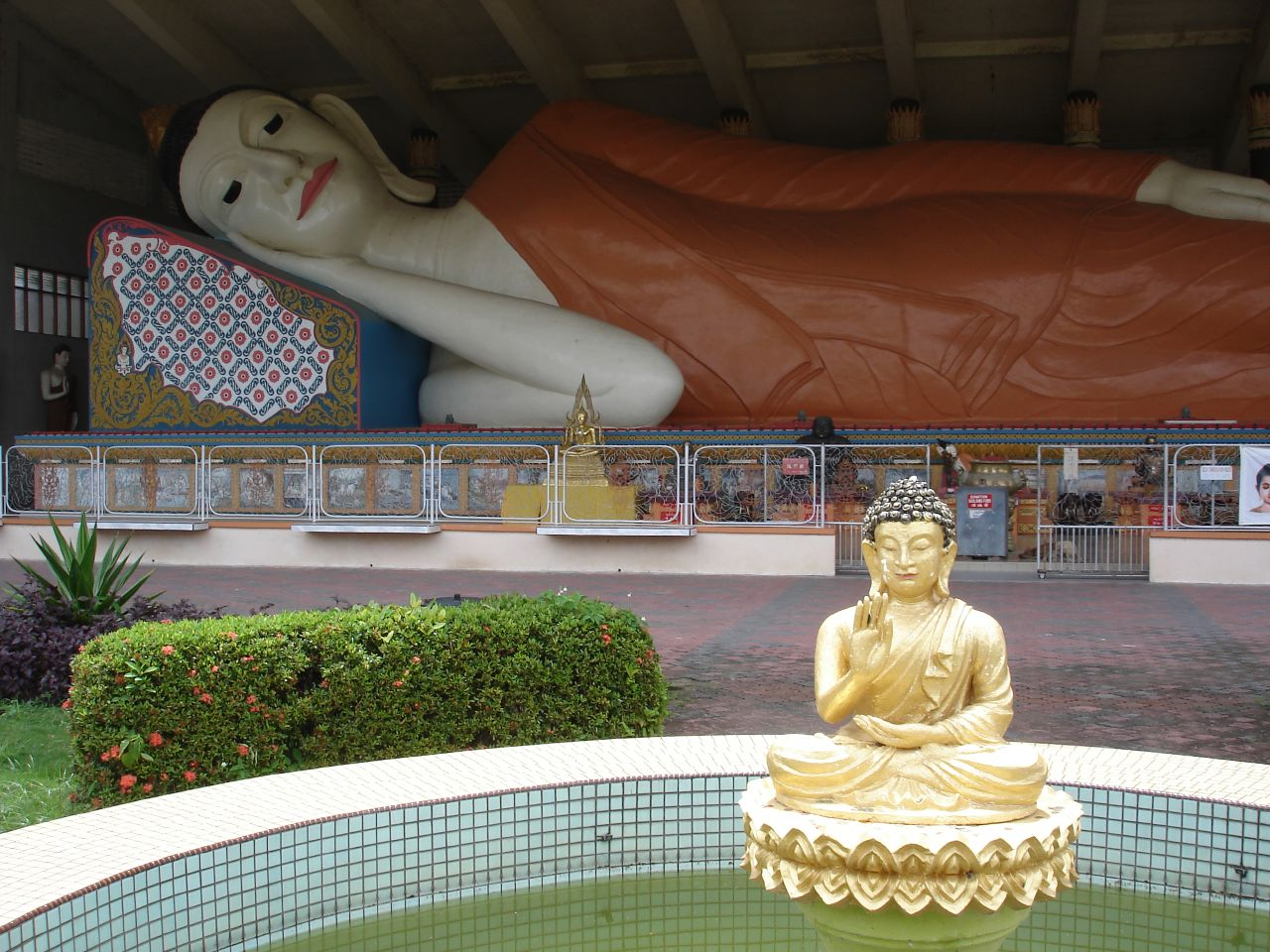

- Wat Machimmaram
- Wat Phothivihan
- Pantai Sri Tujuh
- Pantai Suri
- Pantai Geting
- Pasar Sumayyah
- Pata Ndo (Pdg.Kemahkotaan)
- Pusat Bebas Cukai P.Kubor
- Makam Tok Janggut
- Muzium Wau
- Suluk Tok Selehor
- Masjid Kg Laut, Laman Warisan
- Masjid Ar Rahman Kubang Batang

== Villages ==
- Kampung Bechah Resak
- Kampung Tok Uh
- Kampung Geting
- Kampung Laut
- Kampung Ana
- Kampung Kok Bedullah
- Kampung Delima
- Kampung Jambu
- Kampung Jal Kecik
- Kampung Kutan
- Kampung Sungai Pinang

== Transportation ==
=== Public transport ===
Tumpat is perhaps famous for being the northern terminal of the KTM East Coast Line, which began in Gemas in Negeri Sembilan. Bus options to Kota Bharu and Kuala Terengganu are available.

=== Car ===
The main federal highway serving Tumpat constituency is Federal Route 134, going from downtown Kota Bharu, crossing the Kelantan River and terminating at Pengkalan Kubur. The main roads serving downtown Tumpat are Kelantan state routes D174 and D23.

== Climate ==
Tumpat has a tropical rainforest climate (Af) with moderate rainfall from February to April and heavy to very heavy rainfall in the remaining months.

Climate data for Tumpat
Month	Jan	Feb	Mar	Apr	May	Jun	Jul	Aug	Sep	Oct	Nov	Dec	Year
Mean daily maximum °C (°F)	29.2 (84.6)	30.0 (86.0)	31.3 (88.3)	32.3 (90.1)	32.5 (90.5)	32.2 (90.0)	31.7 (89.1)	31.6 (88.9)	31.5 (88.7)	30.6 (87.1)	29.3 (84.7)	28.6 (83.5)	30.9 (87.6)
Daily mean °C (°F)	26.0 (78.8)	26.2 (79.2)	27.1 (80.8)	27.9 (82.2)	28.2 (82.8)	27.9 (82.2)	27.4 (81.3)	27.4 (81.3)	27.4 (81.3)	26.9 (80.4)	26.2 (79.2)	25.7 (78.3)	27.0 (80.6)
Mean daily minimum °C (°F)	22.6 (72.7)	22.5 (72.5)	22.9 (73.2)	23.6 (74.5)	24.0 (75.2)	23.7 (74.7)	23.2 (73.8)	23.3 (73.9)	23.3 (73.9)	23.3 (73.9)	23.2 (73.8)	22.9 (73.2)	23.2 (73.8)
Average rainfall mm (inches)	172 (6.8)	68 (2.7)	80 (3.1)	79 (3.1)	130 (5.1)	137 (5.4)	129 (5.1)	128 (5.0)	177 (7.0)	238 (9.4)	553 (21.8)	530 (20.9)	2,421 (95.4)
Source: Climate-Data.org

== Notable people ==
- Ibrahim Ali
- Asyraf Wajdi Dusuki
- Pablo Amirul
- Z.Zamri
- Aedy Ashraf
- Saharul Ridzwan
