= Malaysia Federal Route 211 =

Road in Malaysia

Federal Route 211
- Jalan Kubang Kerian-Bachok

Route information
- Maintained by Malaysian Public Works Department
- Length: 15.58 km (9.68 mi)

Major junctions
- West end: Kubang Kerian
- FT 3 / AH18 Wakaf Bharu–Kota Bharu–Kubang Kerian Highway; FT 131 Federal Route 131; FT 3 / AH18 Federal Route 3
- East end: Bachok

Location
- Country: Malaysia
- Primary destinations: Binjai

Highway system
- Highways in Malaysia; Expressways; Federal; State

Federal Route 211, or Jalan Kubang Kerian-Bachok (formerly Kelantan State Route D8), is a federal road in Kelantan, Malaysia.

== Features ==
At most sections, the Federal Route 211 was built under the JKR R5 road standard, allowing maximum speed limit of up to 90 kilometres per hour (56 mph).

== Junction lists ==
Location	km	mi	Destinations	Notes
Kubang Kerian	0.0	0.0	FT 131 Malaysia Federal Route 131 – Sabak, Pengkalan Chepa, Sultan Ismail Petra Airport, Universiti Sains Malaysia (USM) Kubang Kerian Campus, Sabak Beach; FT 3 / AH18 Wakaf Bharu–Kota Bharu–Kubang Kerian Highway – Kota Bharu, Wakaf Bharu, Pasir Mas, Rantau Panjang; FT 3 / AH18 Malaysia Federal Route 3 – Pasir Puteh, Besut, Kuala Terengganu	Western terminus
Kubang Kerian	2.6	1.6	Wakaf Stan Bridge	
Binjai	3.1	1.9	Jalan Sultan Omar – Pengkalan Datu; Jalan Bukit Marak – Bukit Marak	
Bachok	11.0	6.8	D9 Jalan Ustaz Idris Ahmad	
Bachok	11.3	7.0	D137 Jalan Pauh Sembilan	
Bachok	14.3	8.9	D5 Jalan Bachok	Eastern terminus
1.000 mi = 1.609 km; 1.000 km = 0.621 mi
