= Ahmad Yakob =

Malaysian politician (born 1950)

Yang Berhormat Dato' Bentara Kanan Ustaz Dato' Ahmad Yakob SJMK DJMK SMK JP MLA
- أحمد يعقوب
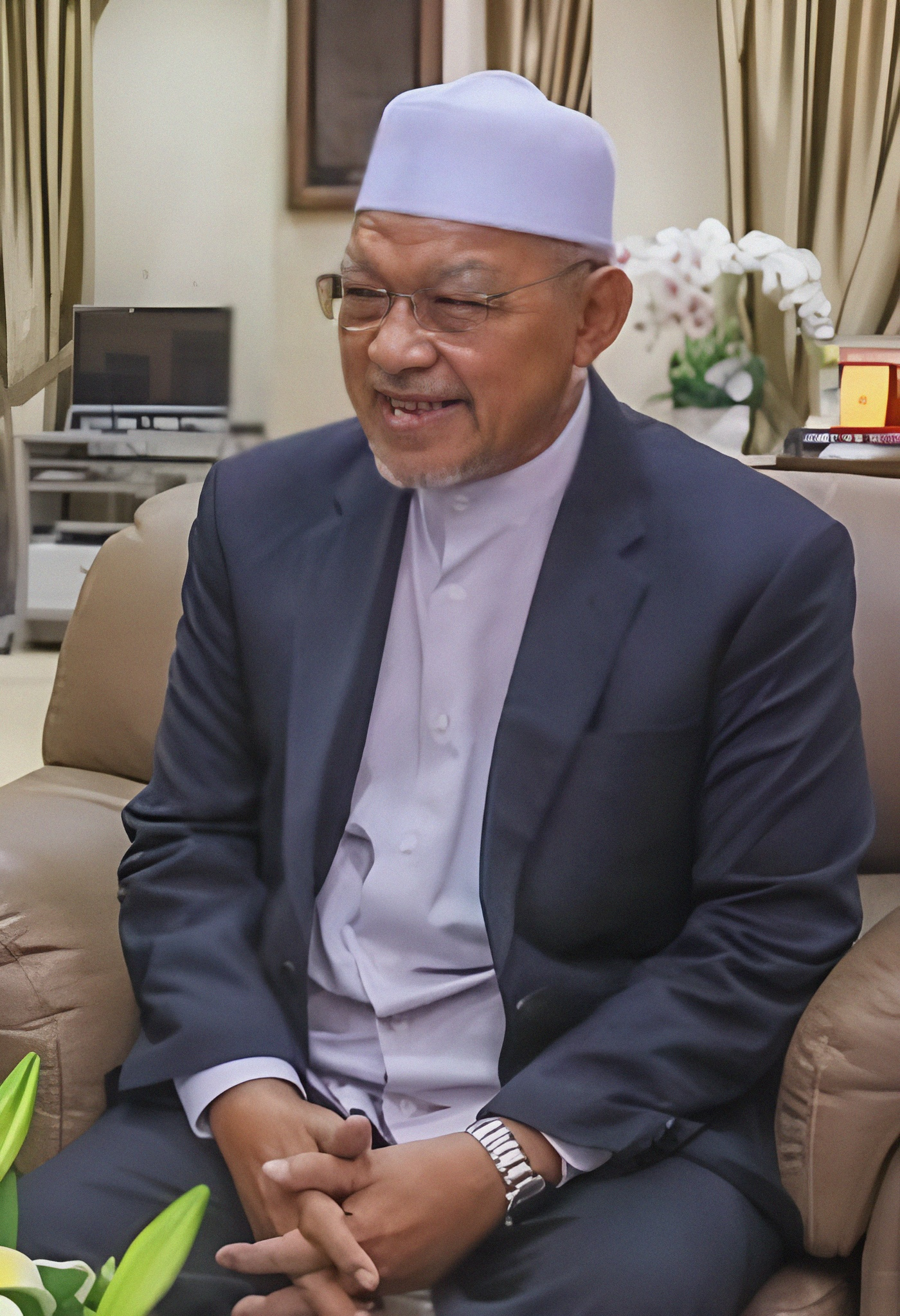
- Ahmad in 2022

5th Spiritual Leader of Malaysian Islamic Party
- Incumbent
- Assumed office 17 November 2026
- Preceded by: Hashim Jasin

Menteri Besar of Kelantan
- In office 6 May 2013 – 15 August 2023
- Monarch: Muhammad V
- Deputy: Mohd Amar Abdullah
- Preceded by: Nik Abdul Aziz Nik Mat
- Succeeded by: Mohd Nassuruddin Daud
- Constituency: Pasir Pekan

Exco roles (Kelantan)
- 1997–1999: Chairman of the Industry, Trade, Entrepreneurial Development and Human Resources
- 1999–2004: Chairman of the Housing, Local Government, Science and Technology
- 2004–2013: Deputy Menteri Besar of Kelantan
- 2004–2008: Chairman of the Land, Regional Development and Environment
- 2008–2013: Chairman of the Public Administration, Land Development and Region

Faction represented in Kelantan State Legislative Assembly
- 1995–2020: Malaysian Islamic Party
- 2020–: Perikatan Nasional

Personal details
- Born: Ahmad bin Yakob; 1 February 1950 (age 76) Tumpat, Kelantan, Federation of Malaya (now Malaysia)
- Citizenship: Malaysian
- Party: Malaysian Islamic Party (PAS) (1986–present)
- Other political affiliations: Perikatan Nasional (PN); Muafakat Nasional (MN); Gagasan Sejahtera (GS); Pakatan Rakyat (PR); Barisan Alternatif (BA); Angkatan Perpaduan Ummah (APU)
- Spouse: Siti Zabidah Ab Hamid (m. 1980)
- Children: 12
- Education: Al-Azhar University; Ain Shams University
- Occupation: Politician
- Profession: Teacher

Ahmad bin Yakob (born 1 February 1950) is a Malaysian politician and teacher who has served as Member of the Kelantan State Legislative Assembly (MLA) for Pasir Pekan since April 1995. He served as the Menteri Besar of Kelantan from May 2013 to August 2023. He is a member, Deputy Spiritual Leader and State Commissioner of Kelantan of the Malaysian Islamic Party (PAS), a component party of the Perikatan Nasional (PN) coalition.

== Early life and education ==
Born on 1 February 1950 in Kampung Berangan, Tumpat, Kelantan to Islamic religious figures, namely Yakob Ishak, a senior activist of Pan-Malaysian Islamic Party (PAS) cum village religious teacher and Che Zainab Che Hussein, a housewife, who is a fellow PAS activist. His father is a PAS figure in Tumpat and detained under Internal Security Act (ISA) 1960 with another PAS figure, Nik Abdullah Arshad.

Ahmad got his elementary education at Berangan Primary School and Bustanul Ariffin Islamic School, Tumpat, before he furthered his secondary education at Islamic Studies College in Kota Bahru. He then studied at Islamic Higher Education Centre of Kelantan, Kota Bahru; before he furthered his study outside Malaysia. He got his Bachelor graduate from Al-Azhar University in Sharia in the 1970s. In 1979, he got Diploma of Education (Arabic Language) from Ain Shams University.

== Early career ==
He started his educational service as a teacher in Dato' Bentara Dalam Secondary School, Segamat, Johor, in 1980. He then taught at Dabong Secondary School, Gua Musang (1986), Pasir Mas Girls' Secondary School (1986) and Rantau Panjang Secondary School (1987). He resigned from being a teacher in 1995 to allow him to contest in Malaysian general election, 1995.

== Political career ==
Ahmad registered as a PAS Member in 1986. Starting from 1986, he was appointed to some political post in PAS, Tumpat Chapter.

In 1995, he was offered to contest in 9th Malaysian General Election for Pasir Pekan assembly seat. He won against BN candidate, Saupi Daud, with the majority of 2,734 votes.

On 17 May 1997, Menteri Besar Nik Abdul Aziz Nik Mat appointed him as a State Executive Councillor (EXCO) in charge of Industry, Trade, Entrepreneurial Development and Human Resources, replacing Rozali Isohak for joining United Malays National Organisation (UMNO).

After 10th Malaysian General Election, he was appointed once again as a State EXCO in charge of Housing, Local Government, Science, Technology and Environment.

In 11th Malaysian General Election, he defeated BN candidate, Mohd. Noor Yaakob, at the same assembly seat with the majority of 2,271 votes.

Ahmad was chosen as the Deputy Menteri Besar of Kelantan on 23 March 2004, replacing Abdul Halim Abdul Rahman. He then was appointed replacing Nik Abdul Aziz Nik Mat as the Menteri Besar of Kelantan on 6 May 2013.

On 17 November 2026, he was appointed as the 5th Spiritual Leader of Malaysian Islamic Party (PAS), replacing Hashim Jasin.

== Personal life ==
He married a teacher, Siti Zabidah Ab Hamid (born 2 February 1960) on 14 August 1980 and the couple had 12 children.

== Election results ==
Kelantan State Legislative Assembly
Year	Constituency	Candidate	Votes	Pct	Opponent(s)	Votes	Pct	Ballots cast	Majority	Turnout
1995	N03 Pasir Pekan	Ahmad Yakob (PAS)	6,980	62.20%	Saupi Daud (UMNO)	4,241	36.73%	11,445	2,739	77.06%
1999	N03 Pasir Pekan	Ahmad Yakob (PAS)	8,389	70.81%	Muhammad Sulaiman (UMNO)	3,458	36.73%	12,108	4,931	78.36%
2004	N03 Pasir Pekan	Ahmad Yakob (PAS)	8,855	57.35%	Md Noor Yaacob (UMNO)	6,584	42.65%	15,687	2,271	80.24%
2008	N03 Pasir Pekan	Ahmad Yakob (PAS)	11,106	62.76%	Md Noor Yaacob (UMNO)	6,590	37.24%	17,991	4,516	83.83%
2013	N03 Pasir Pekan	Ahmad Yakob (PAS)	14,204	62.40%	Nik Noriza Nik Salleh (UMNO)	8,560	37.60%	23,094	5,644	86.00%
2018	N03 Pasir Pekan	Ahmad Yakob (PAS)	14,298	55.41%	Wan Mohd. Sanusi Wan Yunus (UMNO)	5,946	39.78%	22,875	8,352	81.48%
2018	N03 Pasir Pekan	Ahmad Yakob (PAS)	14,298	55.41%	Wan Mohd. Johari Wan Omar (BERSATU)	2,140	4.81%	22,875	8,352	81.48%
2023	N03 Pasir Pekan	Ahmad Yakob (PAS)	18,783	75.88%	Zamakhsari @ Zaman Shari Ibrahim (PKR)	5,972	24.12%	24,755	12,811	63.28%

== Honours ==
- Kelantan
  - Recipient of the Crown of Kelantan Decoration (SMK) (2003)
  - Knight Commander of the Order of the Life of the Crown of Kelantan (DJMK) – Dato' (2005)
  - Knight Grand Commander of the Order of the Life of the Crown of Kelantan (SJMK) – Dato' (2010)
  - Dato' Bentara Kanan (2016)
