= Malaysia Federal Route 134 =

Road in Malaysia

Federal Route 134
- Jalan Pengkalan Kubur

Route information
- Length: 21.87 km (13.59 mi)

Major junctions
- Northwest end: Pengkalan Kubur
- FT 3 AH18 Federal Route 3 FT 3 AH18 Wakaf Bharu–Kota Bharu–Kubang Kerian Highway
- Southeast end: Pasir Pekan

Location
- Country: Malaysia
- Primary destinations: Tak Bai (Thailand); Wakaf Bharu

Highway system
- Highways in Malaysia; Expressways; Federal; State

Federal Route 134, or Jalan Pengkalan Kubur, is a federal road in Kelantan, Malaysia. The Kilometre Zero of the Federal Route 134 starts at Pengkalan Kubur.

== Features ==
At most sections, the Federal Route 134 was built under the JKR R5 road standard, allowing maximum speed limit of up to 90 km/h.

== Kilometre zero ==
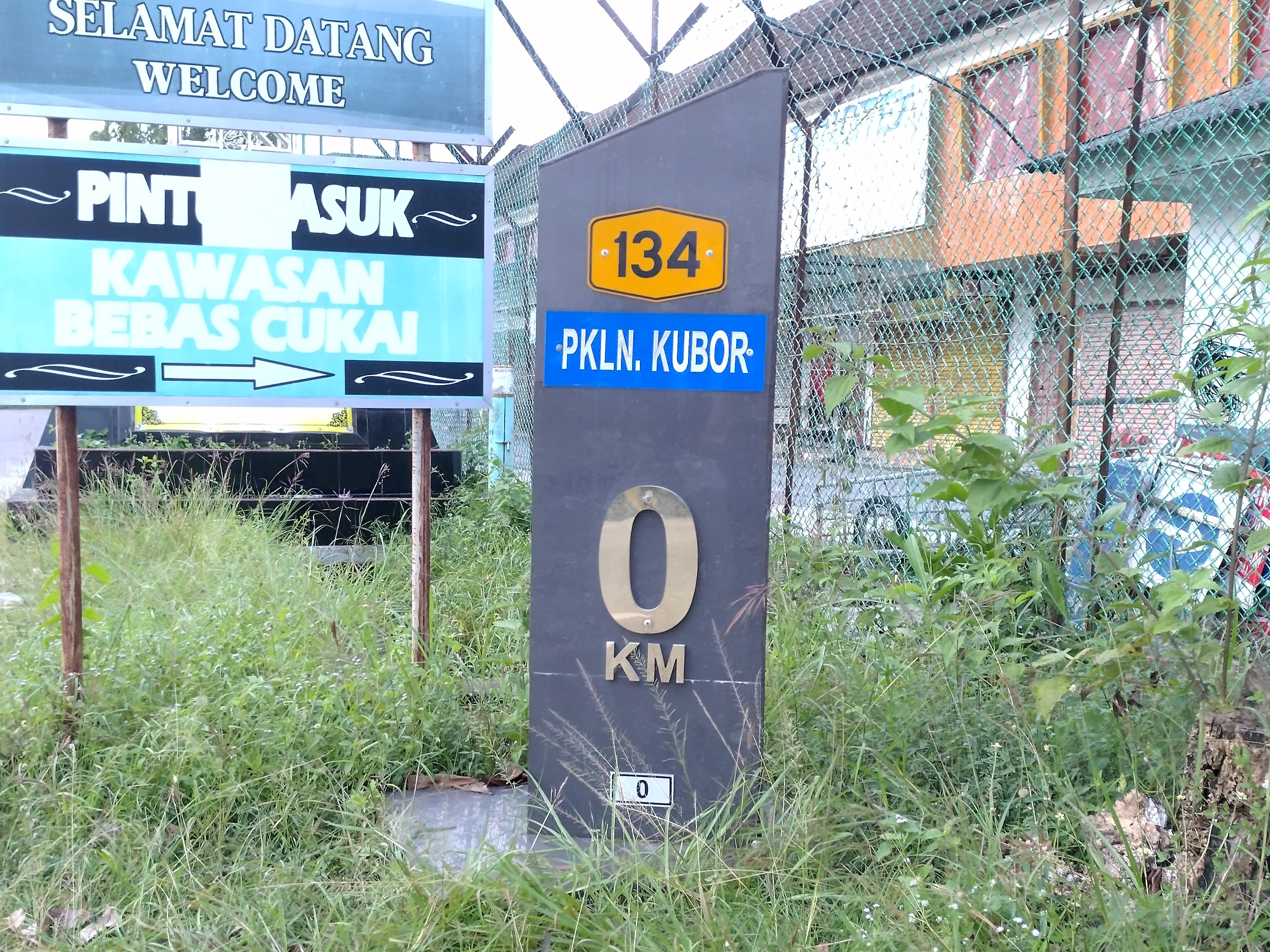
KM 0 Pengkalan Kubor at the Federal Route 134

== List of junctions and towns ==
Km	Exit	Junctions	To	Remarks
FT 134; 0		Pengkalan Kubur; Pengkalan Kubur Ferry Terminal and Checkpoint	Pengkalan Kubur Ferry Terminal and Checkpoint (Ferry Terminal = Ferry to Tak Bai (Thailand))	
		Pengkalan Kubur; Pengkalan Kubor Duty Free Zone	Pengkalan Kubor Duty Free Zone; Duty Free Complex Southwest; Jalan Mertua	Junctions
		Pengkalan Kubur	Northeast; Jalan Masjid; Town Centre; Masjid Pengkalan Kubor	T-junctions
		Pengkalan Kubur	Southwest; FT 196 Rantau Panjang	T-junctions
		Pengkalan Kubur	Northeast; D174 Jalan Pantai Tujuh; Town Centre; Pantai Tujuh; Tumpat	T-junctions
		Pengkalan Kubor Health Clinic		
		Kampung Kok Serai	East; D176 Jalan Kok Serai-Tebok; Kampung Tebok	T-junctions
		Kampung Belukar		
		Kampung Kok Semeru		
		Kampung Pauh Sebanjan		
		Kampung Baruh Kok Pauh		
		Kampung Jubakar		
		Kampung Bunohan		
		Kampung Telaga		
		Kampung Kubang Panjang		
		Kampung Cherang		
		Kampung Telok		
		Kampung Kubang Gajah		
		Kampung Bendang	D23 Jalan Berangan Northwest; D23 Tumpat Southwest; D23 Pasir Mas; D23 Gual Periok; D23 Rantau Panjang; 4056 AH18 Sungai Golok (Thailand); Wat Photivihan	T-junctions
		Kampung Chondong Bata	South; Kampung Kubang Batang	T-junctions
		Kmapung Belukar		
		Kampung Lati		
		Wakaf Bharu	Wakaf Bharu railway station	
		Wakaf Bharu	North; D21 Jalan Baru; Tumpat	Roundabout
		Railway crossing		
		Pasir Pekan	North; Masjid Al-Ismaili Pasir Pekan East; FT 3 AH18 Wakaf Bharu–Kota Bharu–Kubang Kerian Highway; FT 3 AH18 Kota Bharu; FT 3 AH18 Kubang Kerian; FT 3 AH18 Pasir Puteh; FT 3 AH18 Kuala Terengganu Southwest; FT 3 AH18 Pasir Mas; FT 3 AH18 Rantau Panjang; 4056 AH18 Sungai Golok (Thailand)	Junctions
