= Kampung Bechah Resak =

Kampung Bechah Resak is a village located in Tumpat District, Kelantan, Malaysia. The nearest town is Pekan Chabang Empat Tok Mek Ngah.
