= Malaysia Federal Route 223 =

Road in Malaysia

Federal Route 223
- Jalan Pantai Cahaya Bulan (Jalan Pantai Cinta Berahi)

Route information
- Length: 10.50 km (6.52 mi)

Major junctions
- South end: Kota Bharu; Kampung Cina
- D2 Jalan Wakaf Mek Zainab
- North end: Pantai Cahaya Bulan (Pantai Cinta Berahi)

Location
- Country: Malaysia
- Primary destinations: Kampung Banggol

Highway system
- Highways in Malaysia; Expressways; Federal; State

Jalan Pantai Cahaya Bulan, or Jalan Pantai Cinta Berahi, Federal Route 223 (formerly Kelantan State Route D1) is a federal road in Kelantan, Malaysia. The Kilometre Zero of the Federal Route 223 starts at Pantai Cahaya Bulan.

== Features ==
At most sections, the Federal Route 223 was built under the JKR R5 road standard, allowing maximum speed limit of up to 90 kilometres per hour (56 mph).

== Beach ==
Pantai Chinta Berahi or PCB, is a famous beach, Pantai Cahaya Bulan.

== List of junctions ==
Km	Exit	Junctions	To	Remarks
FT 223; 0		Pantai Cahaya Bulan (Pantai Cahaya Bulan)	Pantai Cahaya Bulan (Pantai Cinta Berahi); V Batik shops	
Pantai Cahaya Bulan (Pantai Cinta Berahi)
		Kampung Semut Api		
		Kampung Padang Pasir Luas	East; D101 Jalan Padang Jambu; Padang Jambu	T-junctions
		Kampung Bharu	Northwest; D101 Jalan Teluk Katak; Teluk Katak	T-junctions
		Kampung Kijang		
		Kampung Tok Betek		
		Kampung Banggol		
		Kampung Tikat		
		Kampung Penambang		
		Kampung Sungai Keladi	Kampung Tanjung Chat	T-junctions
		Kampung Penambang		
Kota Bharu, Bandaraya Islam (The Islamic City of Kelantan)
		Kota Bharu; Kampung Cina	East; D2 Jalan Wakaf Mek Zainab; FT 57 Jalan Long Yunus; FT 57 Pengkalan Chepa; Sultan Ismail Petra Airport; Town centre	Roundabout
