= RAF Kota Bharu =

Coordinates: 6°09′58″N 102°17′33″E

RAF Kota Bharu was a former Royal Air Force World War II airfield at Kota Bharu, Kelantan, British Malaya. The airfield was the first to be occupied by the Imperial Japanese in December 1941 during World War II.

It is now the Sultan Ismail Petra Airport.
