= Sultan Yahya Petra Bridge =

Sungai Kelantan Bridge Jambatan Sultan Yahya Petra جمبتن سلطان يحي ڤيترا
- Coordinates: 6°06′58″N 102°13′41″E
- Carries: Motor vehicles, Pedestrians
- Crosses: Kelantan River
- Locale: Federal Route 3 Wakaf Bharu-Kota Bharu-Kubang Kerian Highway
- Official name: Sultan Yahya Petra Bridge
- Maintained by: Malaysian Public Works Department (JKR) Kota Bharu

Characteristics
- Design: arch bridge
- Total length: 2,800-foot
- Width: --
- Longest span: --

History
- Designer: Government of Malaysia; Malaysian Public Works Department (JKR)
- Constructed by: Malaysian Public Works Department (JKR); Kien Huat Private Limited
- Opened: 1967

Location
- Interactive map of Sungai Kelantan Bridge

The Sultan Yahya Petra Bridge (Malay: Jambatan Sultan Yahya Petra; Jawi: جمبتن سلطان يحي ڤيترا) is a major bridge in Kota Bharu, Kelantan, Malaysia crossing Kelantan River. Construction began in 1965 and was completed in 1967, by renowned builder Kien Huat Private Limited, a family firm of Tan Sri Lim Goh Tong. It was opened in 1967 by the late Sultan of Kelantan, Almarhum Sultan Yahya Petra ibni Almarhum Sultan Ibrahim. The bridge was originally a toll bridge making the first toll bridge in Malaysia.

== Current developments ==
=== Construction of the Sultan Yahya Petra Second Bridge ===
The Sultan Yahya Petra Second Bridge project consists of a pair of bridges built at the left and right of the original bridge and a 1-km flyover built on top of the existing Federal Route 3. Construction began in 2009 and was completed in 2012. The bridge becomes the only triple-carriageway bridge in the country, where the original bridge remains as a two-way bridge, while the new bridges constructed at both sides of the original bridge carry one-way traffic each.

== See also ==
- Transport in Malaysia
