= Asia Pacific Flight Training =

Location
- Sultan Ismail Petra Airport; Kota Bharu, Kelantan; Malaysia; 6.1683°N 102.2979°E

Information
- Motto: Dreams Realized
- Established: 2005
- Closed: 2016

Asia Pacific Flight Training Sdn. Bhd. (APFT), is a flying academy located at the Sultan Ismail Petra Airport, Kota Bharu, Kelantan, Malaysia.

APFT offers courses leading to the airplane private, commercial and airline transport pilot licences and multi-engine, instrument and assistant flight instructor ratings. The school also offers a Diploma in Aviation (Pilot Training), which is approved by the Malaysian Qualifications Agency.

== History ==
The school started training students in 2005 and was officially opened in 2006. It is the first Malaysian flight school to be accredited as a "private institution of higher learning". The school has a fleet of over 30 aircraft. It trains pilots for Malaysia Airlines, Nepal Airlines and Garuda Airlines.

In 2009, the school fleet consisted of the Diamond DA-40, Diamond DA-42, Eagle Aircraft 150B, Piper PA-28 Warrior and the Piper PA-34 Seneca, plus an AL200MCC simulator.
