= Wakaf Bharu =

Wakaf Bharu واقف بهارو Wokah Bhaghu
- Suburb of Kota Bharu
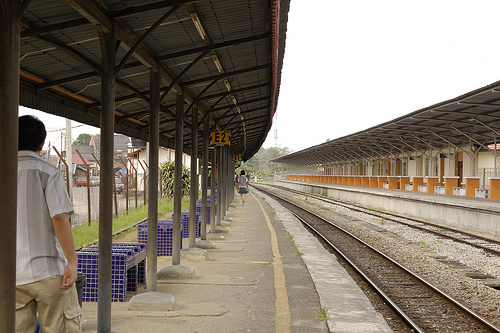
- Wakaf Bharu railway station, the nearest railway station to Kota Bharu.

- Location within Malaysia
- Coordinates: 6°7′21.8″N 102°12′3.7″E
- Country: Malaysia
- State: Kelantan
- District: Tumpat

Government
  - ADUN: Dato Haji Che Abdullah

Area
  - Total: 22.7 km^{2} (8.8 sq mi)
- Time zone: UTC+8 (MST)
  - Summer (DST): Not observed
- Postcode: 16250

Wakaf Bharu (Jawi: واقف بهارو, Kelantanese: Wokah Bhaghu) is a satellite town in Tumpat District, Kelantan, Malaysia. It is located approximately 9 km (5.6 mi) from Kota Bharu, the state capital city.

== Facilities ==
Beside the mosque and several surau, there is also a church in Wakaf Bharu. Examples of housing estates in Wakaf Bharu area are Kawasan Perumahan SBJ (6°6′44″N 102°11′47″E), Taman Sri Palas (6°7′29″N 102°12′32″E) and Taman Sri Delima (6°7′0″N 102°11′23″E), 16250 Wakaf Bharu Kelantan.

== Demographics ==
More than 90 percent at this area are Malays and Muslims. Wakaf Bharu becomes crowded on Friday because there is a well-known market called "Friday Market" near "Pasar Besar Wakaf Bharu" or Wakaf Bharu Big Market.

== Education ==
Two primary schools called "Sekolah Kebangsaan Wakaf Bharu" and "Sekolah Sri Wakaf Bharu" and a secondary school called "Sekolah Menengah Kebangsaan Wakaf Bharu" are located here.

== Transportation ==
The town is served by Wakaf Bharu railway station of Keretapi Tanah Melayu. Wakaf Bharu station is in fact the major disembarkation station for passengers headed towards Kota Bharu, as Kota Bharu itself has no rail service.
