= Pasir Pekan =

State constituency in Kelantan, Malaysia

Pasir Pekan (N03)
Kelantan constituency

State constituency
- Legislature: Kelantan State Legislative Assembly
MLA
Ahmad Yakob
PN
- Constituency created: 1994
- First contested: 1995
- Last contested: 2023

Demographics
- Electors (2023): 39,119

Pasir Pekan is a state constituency in Kelantan, Malaysia, that has been represented in the Kelantan State Legislative Assembly.

The state constituency was first contested in 1995 and is mandated to return a single Assemblyman to the Kelantan State Legislative Assembly under the first-past-the-post voting system.

== Demographics ==
As of 2020, Pasir Pekan has a population of 49,683 people.

Ethnic breakdown of Pasir Pekan's electorate as of 2023
1. Malay (97.1%)
2. Chinese (2.40%)
3. Other ethnicities (0.43%)
4. Indian (0.11%)

== History ==
=== Polling districts ===
According to the Gazette issued on 30 March 2018, the Pasir Pekan constituency has a total of 12 polling districts.

State Constituency	Polling Districts	Code	Location
Pasir Pekan（N03）	Kampung Bendang Pulau	019/03/01	SK Kampong Laut
Pasir Pekan（N03）	Kampung Laut	019/03/02	SMK Kampong Laut
Pasir Pekan（N03）	Kok Pasir	019/03/03	SK Kok Pasir
Pasir Pekan（N03）	Morak	019/03/04	SK Morak
Pasir Pekan（N03）	Palekbang	019/03/05	SK Palekbang
Pasir Pekan（N03）	Pasir Pekan Hilir	019/03/06	SK Padang Pohon Tanjung
Pasir Pekan（N03）	Paloh	019/03/07	SMU (A) Bustanus Saadah Morak
Pasir Pekan（N03）	Pasir Pekan	019/03/08	SK Pasir Pekan
Pasir Pekan（N03）	Kampung Bharu Sungai	019/03/09	SMK Mahmud Mahyiddin
Pasir Pekan（N03）	Kutan	019/03/10	SMK Kutan
Pasir Pekan（N03）	Alor Pasir	019/03/11	SMK Wakaf Bharu
Pasir Pekan（N03）	Kampung Dalam Kota Kubang Labu	019/03/12	SMA Falahiah

=== Representation history ===
Members of the Legislative Assembly for Pasir Pekan
Assembly	No	Years	Member	Party
Constituency created from Wakaf Bharu
9th	N03	1995–1999	Ahmad Yaakob	PAS
10th	N03	1999–2004	Ahmad Yaakob	PAS
11th	N03	2004–2008	Ahmad Yaakob	PAS
12th	N03	2008–2013	Ahmad Yaakob	PR (PAS)
13th	N03	2013–2018	Ahmad Yaakob	PR (PAS)
14th	N03	2018–2020	Ahmad Yaakob	PAS
14th	N03	2020–2023	Ahmad Yaakob	PN (PAS)
15th	N03	2023–present	Ahmad Yaakob	PN (PAS)

== Election results ==
Kelantan state election, 2023: Pasir Pekan
Party	Candidate	Votes	%	∆%
PAS	Ahmad Yakob	18,783	75.84	▲11.96
PH	Zaman Shari Ibrahim	5,972	24.16	▲24.16
Total valid votes		24,755	100.00	
Total rejected ballots		179		
Unreturned ballots		54		
Turnout		24,988	63.88	▼17.60
Registered electors		39,119		
Majority		12,881	51.68	▲14.37
PAS hold		Swing		

Kelantan state election, 2018: Pasir Pekan
Party	Candidate	Votes	%	∆%
PAS	Ahmad Yaakob	14,298	63.88	▲1.48
BN	Wan Mohd. Sanusi Wan Yunus	5,946	26.56	▼11.04
PKR	Wan Mohd. Johari Wan Omar	2,140	9.56	▲9.56
Total valid votes		22,384	100.00	
Total rejected ballots		247		
Unreturned ballots		244		
Turnout		22,875	81.48	▼4.52
Registered electors		28,075		
Majority		8,352	37.31	▲12.51
PAS hold		Swing		

Kelantan state election, 2013: Pasir Pekan
Party	Candidate	Votes	%	∆%
PAS	Ahmad Yaakob	14,204	62.40	▼0.36
BN	Nik Noriza Nik Salleh	8,560	37.60	▲0.36
Total valid votes		22,764	100.00	
Total rejected ballots		289		
Unreturned ballots		54		
Turnout		23,094	86.00	▲2.17
Registered electors		26,854		
Majority		5,644	24.80	▼0.72
PAS hold		Swing		

Kelantan state election, 2008: Pasir Pekan
Party	Candidate	Votes	%	∆%
PAS	Ahmad Yaakob	11,106	62.76	▲5.41
BN	Md Noor Yaacob	6,590	37.24	▼5.41
Total valid votes		17,696	100.00	
Total rejected ballots		253		
Unreturned ballots		42		
Turnout		17,991	83.83	▲3.59
Registered electors		21,462		
Majority		4,516	25.52	▲10.82
PAS hold		Swing		

Kelantan state election, 2004: Pasir Pekan
Party	Candidate	Votes	%	∆%
PAS	Ahmad Yaakob	8,855	57.35	▼13.43
BN	Md Noor Yaacob	6,584	42.65	▲13.43
Total valid votes		15,439	100.00	
Total rejected ballots		213		
Unreturned ballots		34		
Turnout		15,687	80.24	▲1.88
Registered electors		19,550		
Majority		2,271	14.70	▼26.92
PAS hold		Swing		

Kelantan state election, 1999: Pasir Pekan
Party	Candidate	Votes	%	∆%
PAS	Ahmad Yaakob	8,389	70.81	▲8.61
BN	Muhammad Sulaiman	3,458	29.19	▼8.61
Total valid votes		11,847	100.00	
Total rejected ballots		251		
Unreturned ballots		10		
Turnout		12,108	78.36	▲1.30
Registered electors		15,452		
Majority		4,931	41.62	▲17.22
PAS hold		Swing		

Kelantan state election, 1995: Pasir Pekan
Party	Candidate	Votes	%
PAS	Ahmad Yaakob	6,980	62.20
BN	Saupi Daud	4,241	37.80
Total valid votes		11,221	100.00
Total rejected ballots		187	
Unreturned ballots		37	
Turnout		11,445	77.06
Registered electors		14,852	
Majority		2,739	24.40
This was a new constituency created.
