= Kubang Kerian =

Royal capital of Kelantan

Coordinates: 6°05′N 102°17′E

Kubang Kerian (Kelantanese: Kubey Kkiye) is a parliamentary constituency in Kota Bharu District, Kelantan, Malaysia. It is the state's royal seat, under the official name Bandar D'Raja Al-Muhammadi.

== Transportation ==
Kubang Kerian is about 10–15 minutes drive on Federal Route FT 8 from Kota Bharu, the capital city, depending on the traffic condition. It is also about 15–20 minutes from the airport in Pengkalan Chepa. However, if commuters prefer to take a taxi, RM30 will be charged if the taxi is taken from the airport to Kubang Kerian. If a taxi is taken between 12 a.m. to 6 a.m., taxi charges will include another 50% additional night service charge, which costs RM45. Also, there are also city bus service under Ministry of Transport, which is the BAS.MY, that connects Kubang Kerian with many places such as bus route D50 which connects Kubang Kerian with Bukit Marak and Bachok, route D51 connects with Pasir Puteh and Jerteh, Besut, Terengganu and route D52 which connects with Kg Raja, Besut, Terengganu.

== Infrastructure ==
=== Education ===
The Universiti Sains Malaysia (USM), Health Campus is located here. This campus is also referred to as USM Health Campus. The campus houses 3 schools - the School of Medical Sciences, the School of Dentistry and the School of Health Sciences. A 760-bed teaching hospital is located on campus. This is the Hospital Universiti Sains Malaysia (HUSM). Also, there are elementary religious school which is Maahad Ar-Rahmah Kenali (MARK) also has been a has been a key institution providing Islamic education in Kubang Kerian. Located along Jalan Tok Kenali, it operates under the administration of the Yayasan Islam Kelantan (YIK). The name of the school which is Ar-Rahmah was taken its name from Hajah Rahmah, the daughter of one of the notable scholar in Kelantan Tok Kenali

Kubang Kerian has become a new economic hub for Kelantan. The setup of the USM Health Campus in Kubang Kerian since 1983 has attracted other businesses to move to Kubang Kerian, which help to boost the economy of Kubang Kerian.

=== Houses of worship ===
Being a Muslim-majority area, Kubang Kerian has many mosques than churches and temples. The largest mosque is the Al-Sultan Ismail Petra Mosque, which is the Kelantan Royal Mosque, which is 5 minutes drive from USM. Also there are also many mosques in Kubang Kerian such as Sallehi Kenali Mosque, Raja Perempuan Zainab II Mosque (State Palace Mosque), Health Campus of Malaysian Science University (USM) Mosque, Darul Huda Mosque Complex, and more

== Government and politics ==
Kubang Kerian is represented in the Malaysian Parliament by Tuan Ibrahim Tuan Man of PAS. The constituency is further divided into three seats in the Kelantan State Legislative Assembly:

- Salor;
- Pasir Tumbuh; and
- Demit.

The latter 3 seats are currently held by PAS.

In terms of local government, the Pasir Tumbuh and Demit constituencies fall under the jurisdiction of the Kota Bharu Municipal Council (MPKB-BRI) while the Salor constituency is administered by the Ketereh District Council.
