= Pengkalan Chepa =

Coordinates: 6°10′N 102°17′E

Pengkalan Chepa Kaley Chepo (Kelantan-Pattani Malay)
- Suburb of Kota Bharu
- Interactive map of Pengkalan Chepa
- Country: Malaysia
- State: Kelantan
- District: Kota Bharu District
- Local area government: Kota Bharu Municipal Council (MPKB)

Pengkalan Chepa (Kelantanese: Kaley Chepo) is a town and parliamentary constituency in Kelantan, Malaysia. Situated about 8 km (5 mi) from Kota Bharu, the state capital, it is within the Kota Bharu metropolitan area.

Pengkalan Chepa is where the Sultan Ismail Petra Airport is located.

The town was a focal point of Cham people coming to Kelantan for trade and religious studies for centuries; the name "Chepa" (Jawi: چڤا, modern spelling: Cepa) is in reference to their former kingdom of Champa hence "Champa Landing".
