= Sultan Ismail Petra Airport =

Airport serving Kota Bharu, Malaysia

Sultan Ismail Petra Airport Lapangan Terbang Sultan Ismail Petra
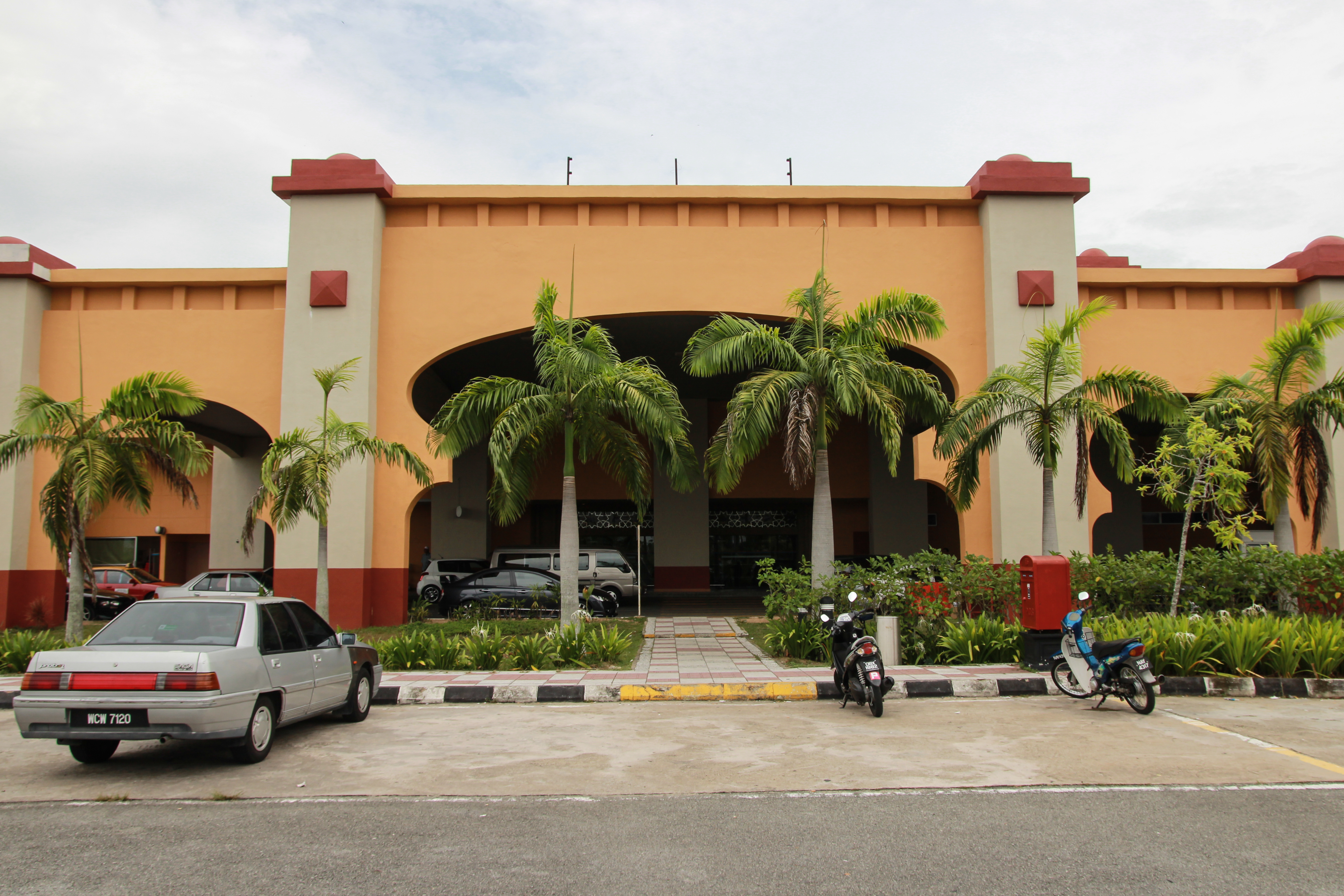
- Sultan Ismail Petra Airport before expansion
- IATA: KBR; ICAO: WMKC

Summary
- Airport type: Public
- Owner: Malaysia Airports
- Operator: Malaysia Airports Holdings Berhad
- Serves: Kota Bharu, Kelantan and Besut, Terengganu
- Location: Pengkalan Chepa, Kelantan, Malaysia
- Time zone: MST (UTC+08:00)
- Elevation AMSL: 16 ft (4.9 m)
- Coordinates: 6.1672560°N 102.2922092°E

Map
- Location on the east coast of Malaysia KBR /WMKC (Peninsular Malaysia) KBR /WMKC (Malaysia) KBR /WMKC (Southeast Asia) KBR /WMKC (Asia)

Runways
Direction	Length		Surface
Direction	m	ft	Surface
10/28	2,400	7,874	Asphalt

Statistics (2023)
- Passenger: 1,251,330 (▼15.1%)
- Airfreight (tonnes): 1,073 (▲38.4%)
- Aircraft movements: 24,481 (▼19.6%)
- Sources: official website AIP Malaysia

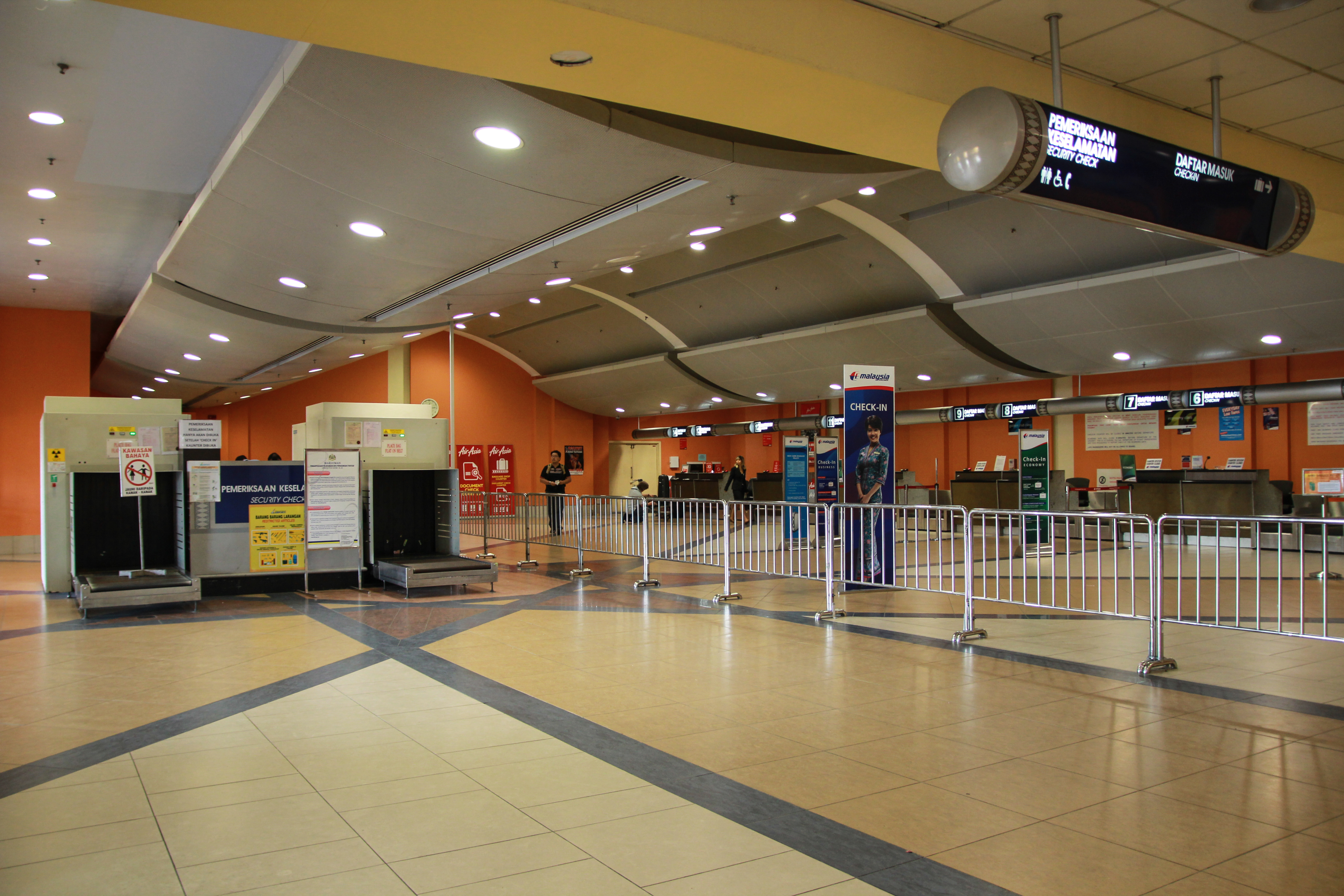
Boarding gate view of Sultan Ismail Petra Airport before expansion

Sultan Ismail Petra Airport (IATA: KBR, ICAO: WMKC) is an airport serving Kota Bharu, a city in the state of Kelantan in Malaysia. The airport is named after Ismail Petra of Kelantan, the 28th Sultan of Kelantan, who ruled from 1979 to 2010. It is currently undergoing expansion through multiple phases to be an international airport, with phase 1 being completed and opened on 1 May 2024.

It is the second-oldest airport in Peninsular Malaysia and the busiest airport on the East Coast.

== History ==
The airport is a former RAF station base, RAF Kota Bharu and a former British military airfield. It was the landing site of the Japanese invasion of Malaya during World War II. The scene of the first Japanese landing in Malaya was on 8 December 1941.

After the war, the RAF military airfield was turned into a civilian airport. The passenger terminal was built and known as Pengkalan Chepa Airport. The inaugural commercial flight to Kelantan occurred on April 6, 1938, following a route survey conducted by Wearne's Air Service. On April 3, 1940, the airline officially launched regular scheduled flights, establishing a connection between Kota Bharu and Singapore, with stops including to Penang and Kuala Lumpur.

== Development and expansion ==
In 1999, the government announced that the Sultan Ismail Petra Airport would be relocated to a new terminal building. The project started in September 2000 and was completed in June 2002 with a total cost of approximately RM55 million. After the terminal was expanded and a new building was built, it became known as Sultan Ismail Petra Airport. The old terminal was used by Asia Pacific Flight Training flying school. It was then permanently closed to give way for the current airport expansion.

In the third quarter of 2008, Malaysia Airports Holdings Berhad built a new hangar, a new apron, and new aircraft and helicopter parking bays. It also made taxiway improvements to cater to the growth of the Asia Pacific Flight Training flying school.

In October 2008, the government announced that it intended to extend the runway to a length of 2,400 m (7,874 ft).

In May 2010, TRC Synergy Bhd's unit, Trans Resources Corp Sdn Bhd secured a RM45.5 million contract to upgrade the Sultan Ismail Petra airport in Kota Bharu. TRC said its unit received the letter of acceptance from Wira Akil Holdings Sdn Bhd. The letter of acceptance was subsequent to an award being given by the Ministry of Transport to Wira Akil whereby TRC was named as the sub-contractor for the project. The project started on 14 June 2010 and included the construction of a taxiway, helicopter pads, a meteorological station and instrument landing system (ILS). The airport runway was lengthened from 1,981 m to 2,400 m, and can accommodate the Boeing 737-800 and Airbus A320. All works were slated for completion by September 2011.

In February 2013, AirAsia Berhad and Firefly Sdn Bhd signed an agreement with Malaysia Airport Holdings Berhad (MAHB) to make Sultan Ismail Petra Airport their secondary hub.

In July 2015, Malaysia Airports was planning for the expansion of Sultan Ismail Petra Airport in Kelantan, which had exceeded its 1.5 million capacity. The building will be expanded to cater to 4 million passengers with a new multi-storey car park and additional aircraft stands (aerobridge) to cope with the expected increase in traffic in the coming decade.

In the 2016 Malaysian federal budget (presented October 2015 ), the Prime Minister announced RM450 million for upgrading work under the Eleventh Malaysian Plan (Malay: Rancangan Malaysia ke-11) (2016–2020). Works include a new multi-storey car park, additional aircraft stands (aerobridge), apron expansion, enlargement runway/taxiway and a new terminal.

In October 2017, Malaysia Federal Government allocated RM 450 million for upgrading the airport terminals.

=== Demolition of previous terminal and relocation to the new building ===
The previous terminal, now demolished, operated from 12 September 2002 until 30 April 2024. This terminal adopted Moorish architecture. It had curved archways and was white in colour. The airport had a 12,000 square metre terminal with three aircraft stands. Its three aerobridges were salvaged from the old Subang Airport and refurbished. The terminal accommodated up to 1.45 million passengers a year.

The current, new building of the airport commenced operation on 1 May 2024. It is expected to receive between 30 and 35 flights and observe an increase in passengers of 4,000 to 4,500 passengers per day. It is equipped with over 20 flight counters and has a separate, dedicated lane for future international passengers.

The new terminal has over 20 airline counters, multi-storey car parks, special lanes for taxis, a fire and rescue station, additional space for parking aircraft and an LTSIP cashless operating system for passengers. The multi-level car park within the airport is fed by a free shuttle bus providing access to passengers.

The LTSIP expansion and upgrading projects cost RM440mil. Current expansion has entered phase two and is scheduled to be completed on January 26, 2025. Upon full completion, the airport will be able to handle 4 million passengers annually.

In May 2024, Prime Minister Anwar Ibrahim agreed to upgrade the airport into an international airport by extending the airport runway by 400m, bringing the total length to 2,800m. One of the reasons for this is so that Hajj pilgrims can fly directly to Jeddah from Kota Bharu.

== Operating hours ==
The airport's normal operating hours are between 6:00 a.m. and 12:00 a.m. In the event of flight delays, the airport will remain open until the flight has taken off or has been cancelled.

== Airlines and destinations ==
=== Passenger ===
Airlines	Destinations
AirAsia	Jakarta–Soekarno-Hatta, Johor Bahru, Kota Kinabalu, Kuala Lumpur–International, Kuching
Batik Air Malaysia	Kuala Lumpur–International, Kuala Lumpur–Subang
Firefly	Kuala Lumpur–International, Kuala Lumpur–Subang, Penang
Malaysia Airlines	Kuala Lumpur–International
Scoot	Singapore

== Traffic and statistics ==
Annual passenger numbers and aircraft statistics ^{Source: Malaysia Airports Holdings Berhad}
Year	Passengers handled	Passenger % change	Cargo (tonnes)	Cargo % change	Aircraft movements	Aircraft % change
2003	589,950	Steady	315	Steady	10,010	Steady
2004	639,871	▲ +8.5	235	▼ -25.4	11,869	▲ +18.6
2005	635,397	▼ -0.7	168	▼ -28.5	11, 194	▼ -5.7
2006	678,306	▲ +6.7	210	▲ +25.0	38,352	▲ +242.6
2007	759,316	▲ +12.0	163	▼ -22.4	58,996	▲ +53.8
2008	836,060	▲ +10.1	181	▲ +11.0	57,102	▼ -3.2
2009	1,003,162	▲ +20.0	185	▲ +2.2	74,863	▲ +31.1
2010	1,047,755	▲ +4.4	177	▼ -4.3	75,906	▲ +1.4
2011	1,132,345	▲ +8.1	164	▼ -7.3	64,114	▼ -15.5
2012	1,259,205	▲ +11.2	147	▼ -10.4	50,991	▼ -20.5
2013	1,585,238	▲ +25.9	179	▲ +21.8	50,406	▼ -1.1
2014	1,800,836	▲ +13.6	397	▲ +121.6	44,628	▼ -11.5
2015	2,063,747	▲ +14.6	1,003	▲ +152.5	42,810	▼ -4.1
2016	2,062,248	▼ -0.1	780	▼ -22.2	31,956	▼ -25.4
2017	1,988,212	▼ -3.6	775	▼ -0.7	30,433	▼ -4.8
2018	1,688,625	▼ -15.1	1,073	▲ +38.4	24,481	▼ -19.6
2019	1,823,089	▲ +8.0	1,250	▲ +16.6	25,383	▲ +3.7
2020	711,480	▼ -61.0	545	▼ -56.4	13,460	▼ -47.0
2021	501,930	▼ -29.5	441	▼ -18.9	9,527	▼ -27.4
2022	1,384,903	▲ +175.9	988	▲ +123.8	19,027	▲ +99.7
2023	1,583,288	▲ +14.3	639	▼ -35.3	18,403	▼ -3.3

== Charter operators ==
=== MHS Aviation ===
- MHS Aviation is the leading provider of helicopter charter services in Sultan Ismail Petra Airport. It specializes in the movement of personnel, ferrying workers to and from offshore production platforms, equipment to and from the offshore installation and drilling rigs mainly for oil companies in the Malaysia-Thailand joint development area, South China Sea.

=== Weststar Aviation ===
- Weststar Aviation is the other charter offshore helicopter operator which operates from this airport to oil and gas companies in the Malaysia-Thailand joint development area, South China Sea.

=== Helistar Resources Sdn. Bhd. ===
- Helistar Resources Sdn. Bhd. is the latest charter offshore helicopter operator which transports rig workers from this airport to oil and gas platforms in the Malaysia-Thailand joint development area, South China Sea.

== Accidents and incidents ==
- 24 December 2025 – A construction worker was killed at a construction site in the airport while another worker was injured at the scene.

== Gallery ==
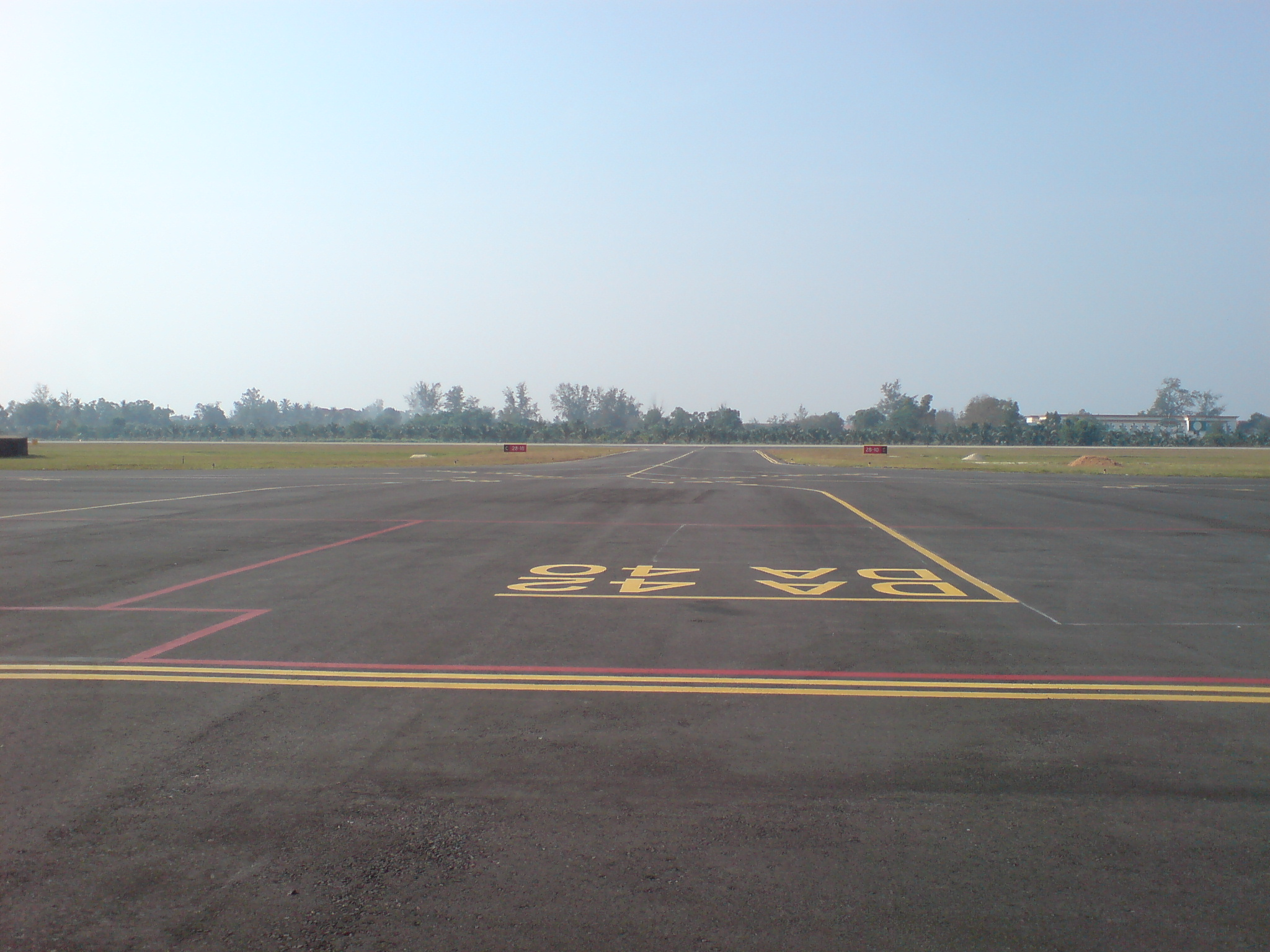
Holding point C and apron as seen in the new section of the Sultan Ismail Petra Airport

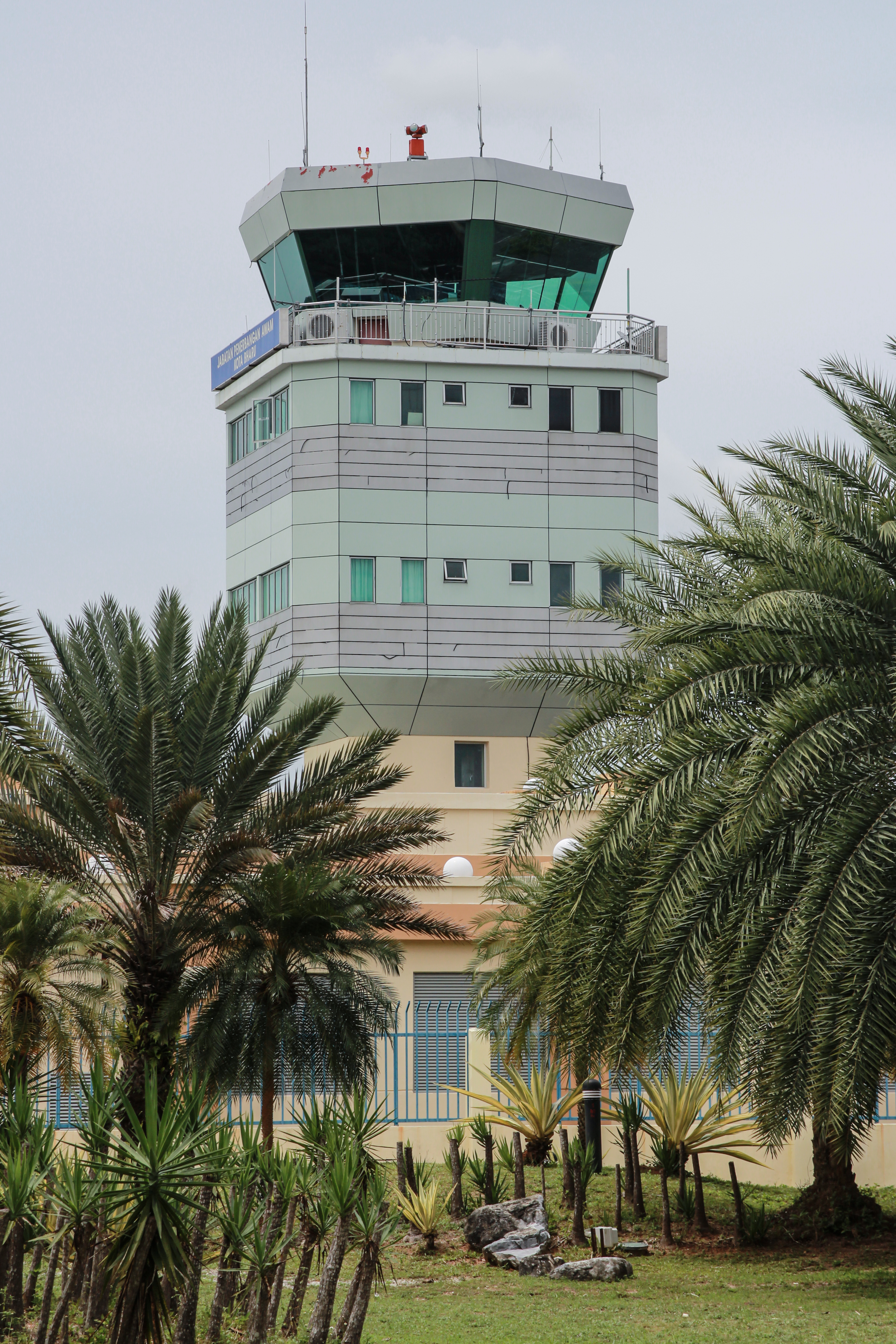
Air Traffic Controller tower at Sultan Ismail Petra Airport

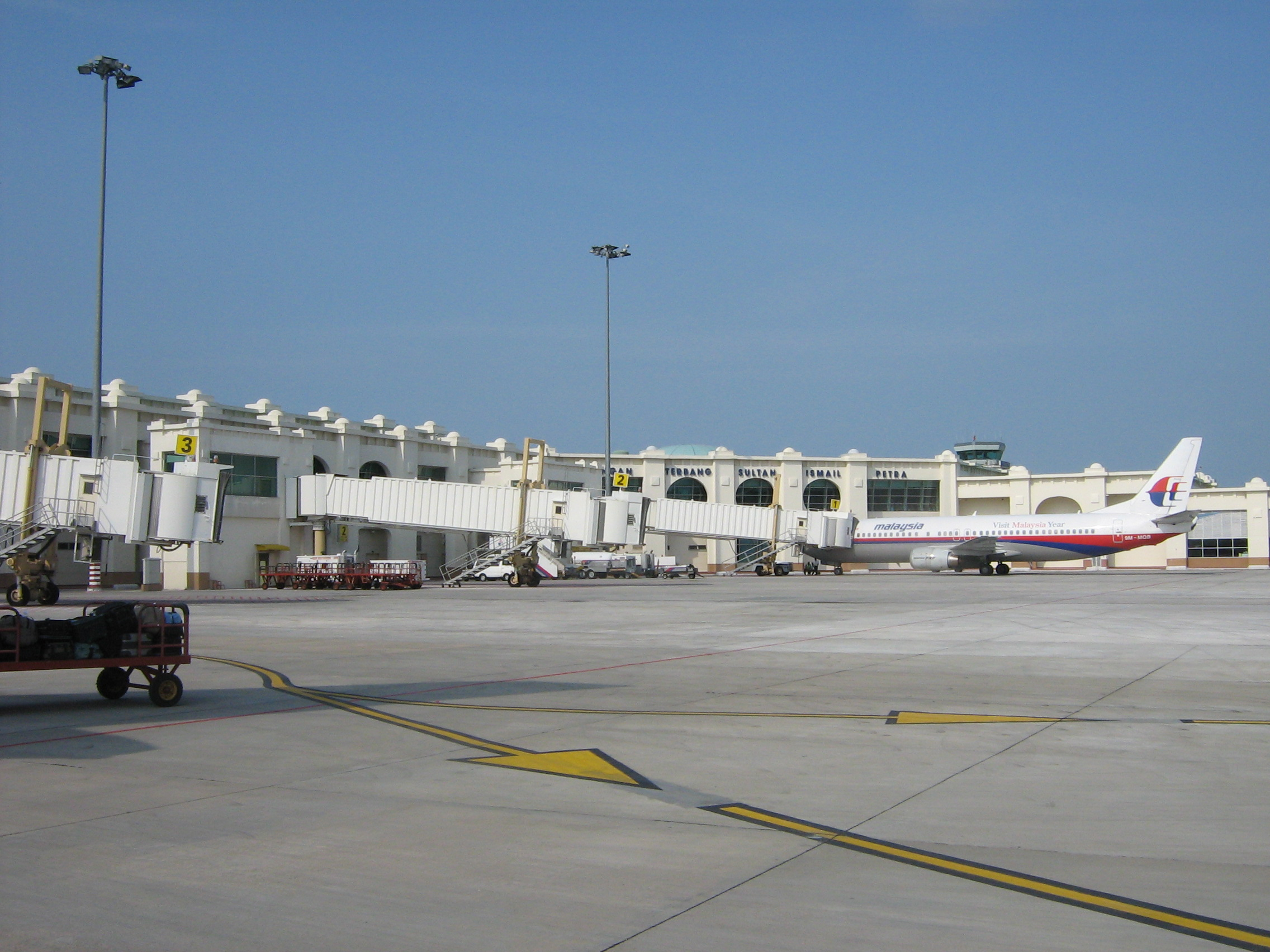
Old apron view of Sultan Ismail Petra Airport

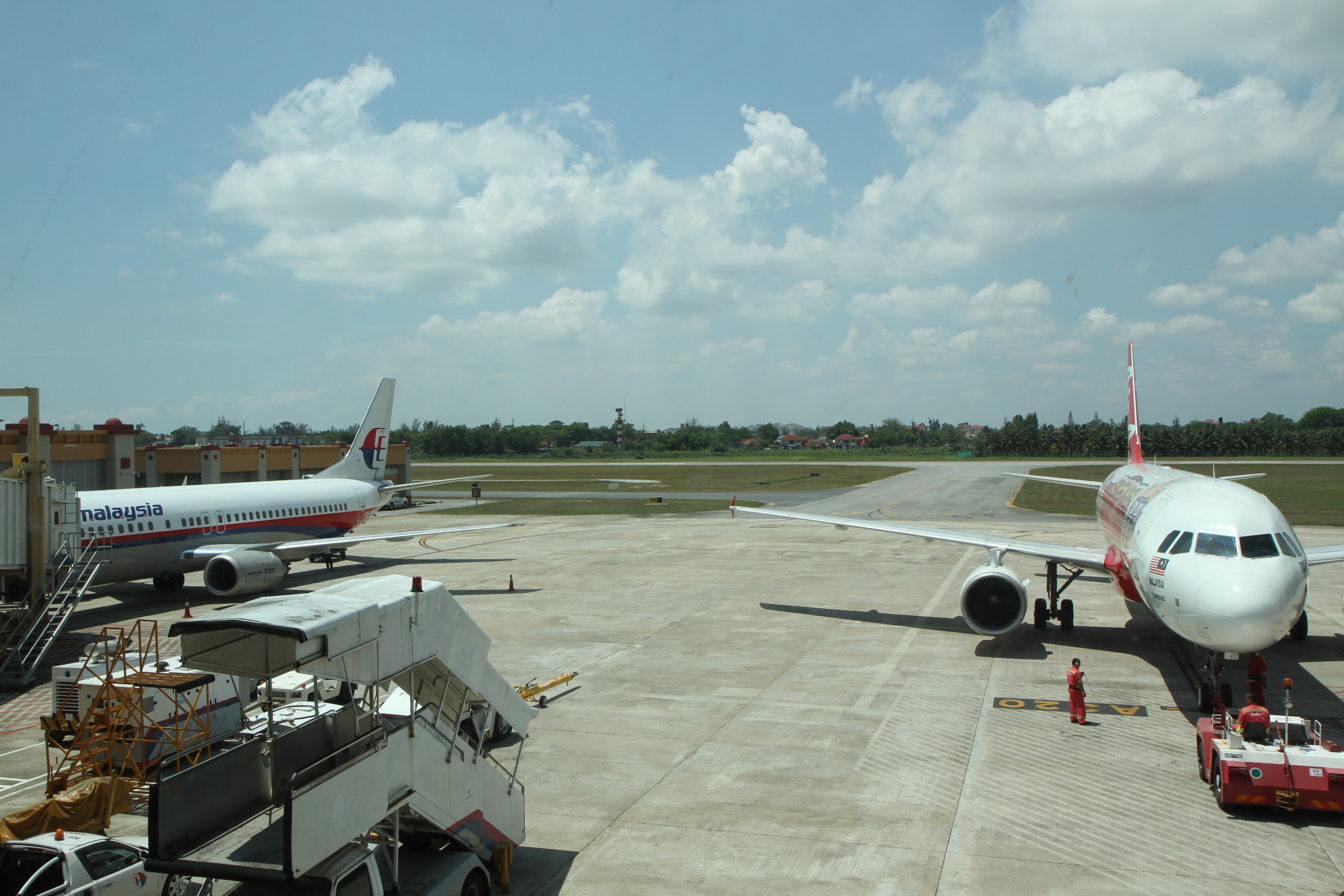
Boarding gate view of Sultan Ismail Petra Airport

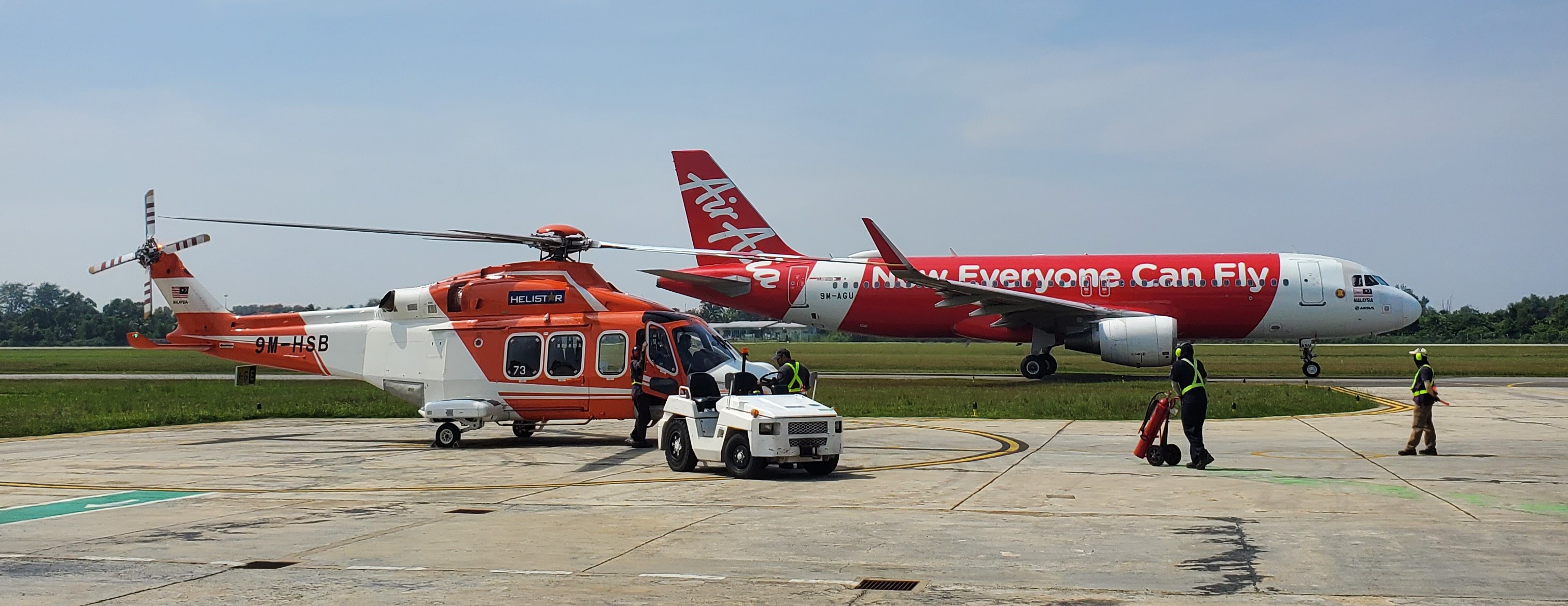
AW139 operated by Helistar Resources with Airasia A320 seen from Helistar Hangar apron

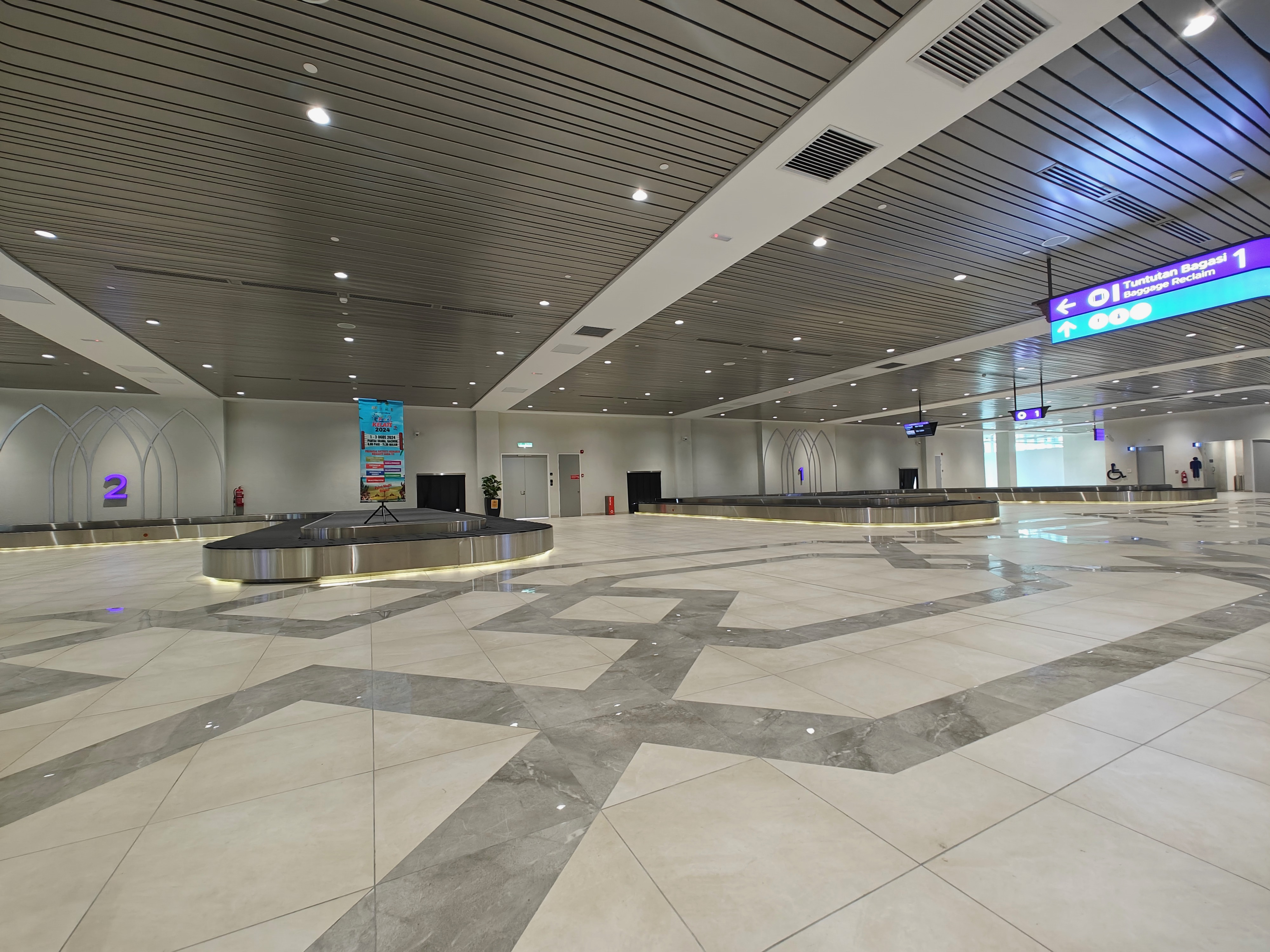
Luggage claim area inside new building

== See also ==
- List of airlines of Malaysia
- List of airports in Malaysia
- Busiest airports in Malaysia
