= Kota Bharu =

Kota Bharu Koto Baghu (Kelantan-Pattani Malay)
- Town, state capital and district capital
- Town of Kota Bharu; Bandar Kota Bharu
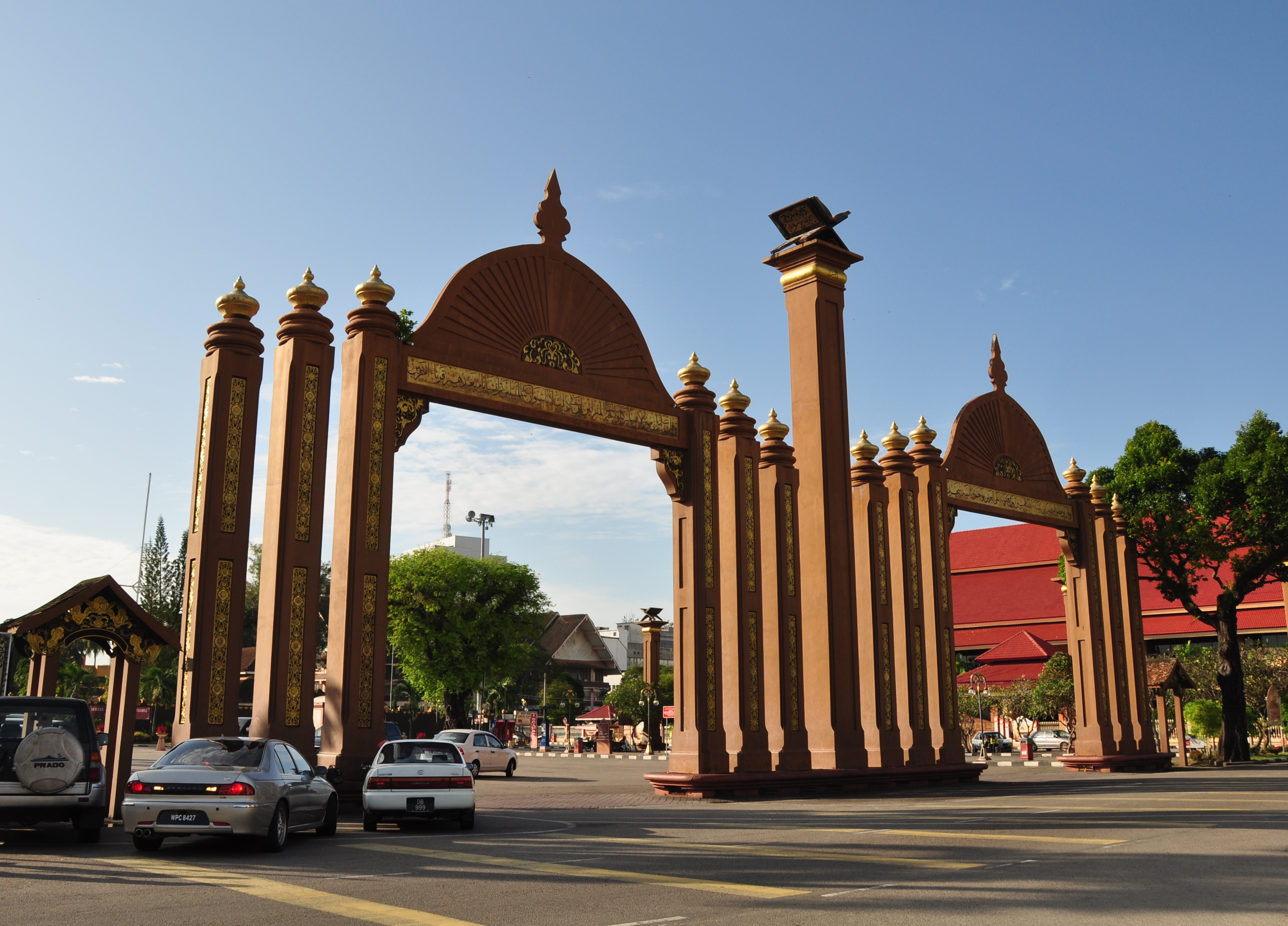
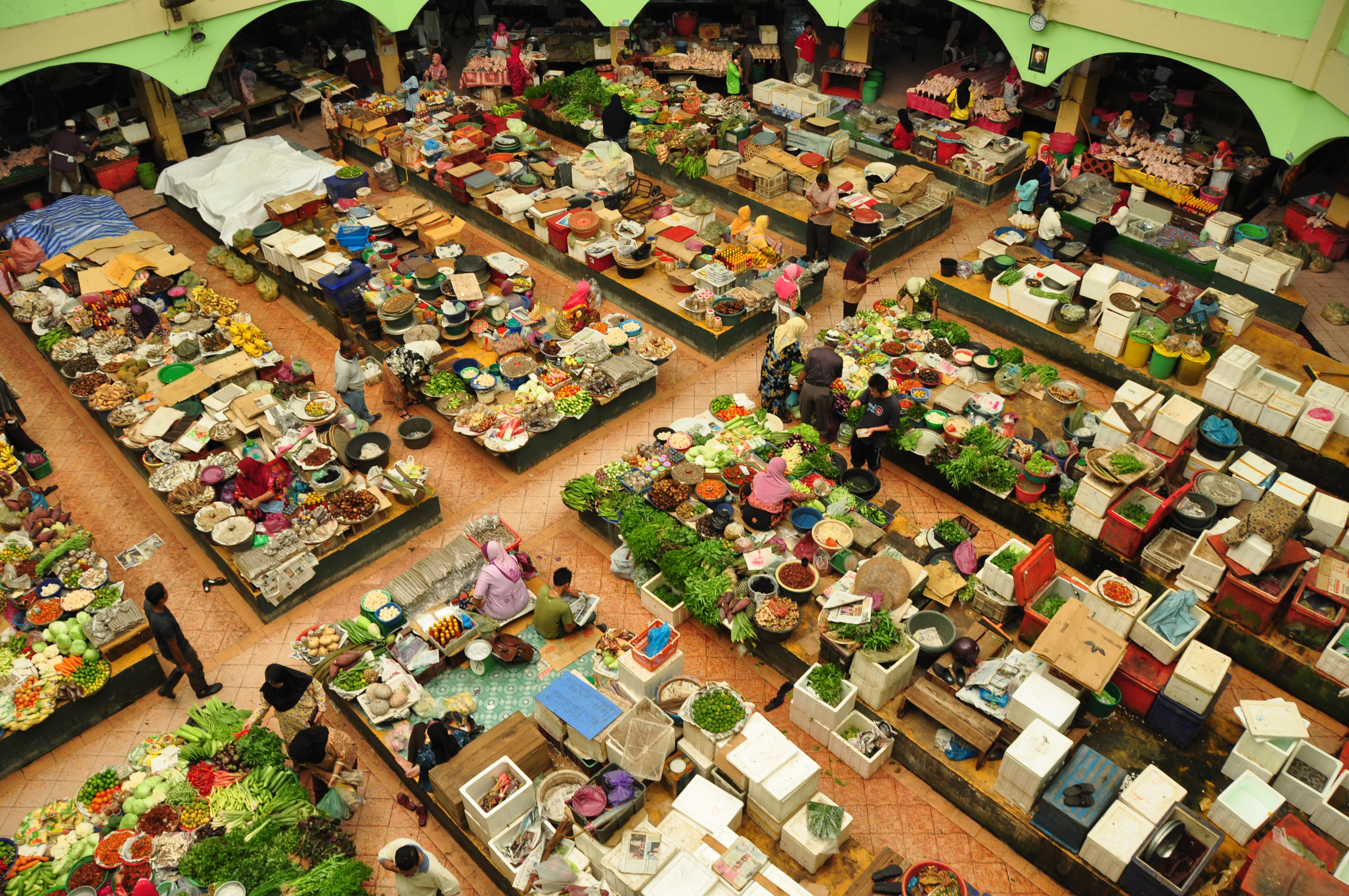
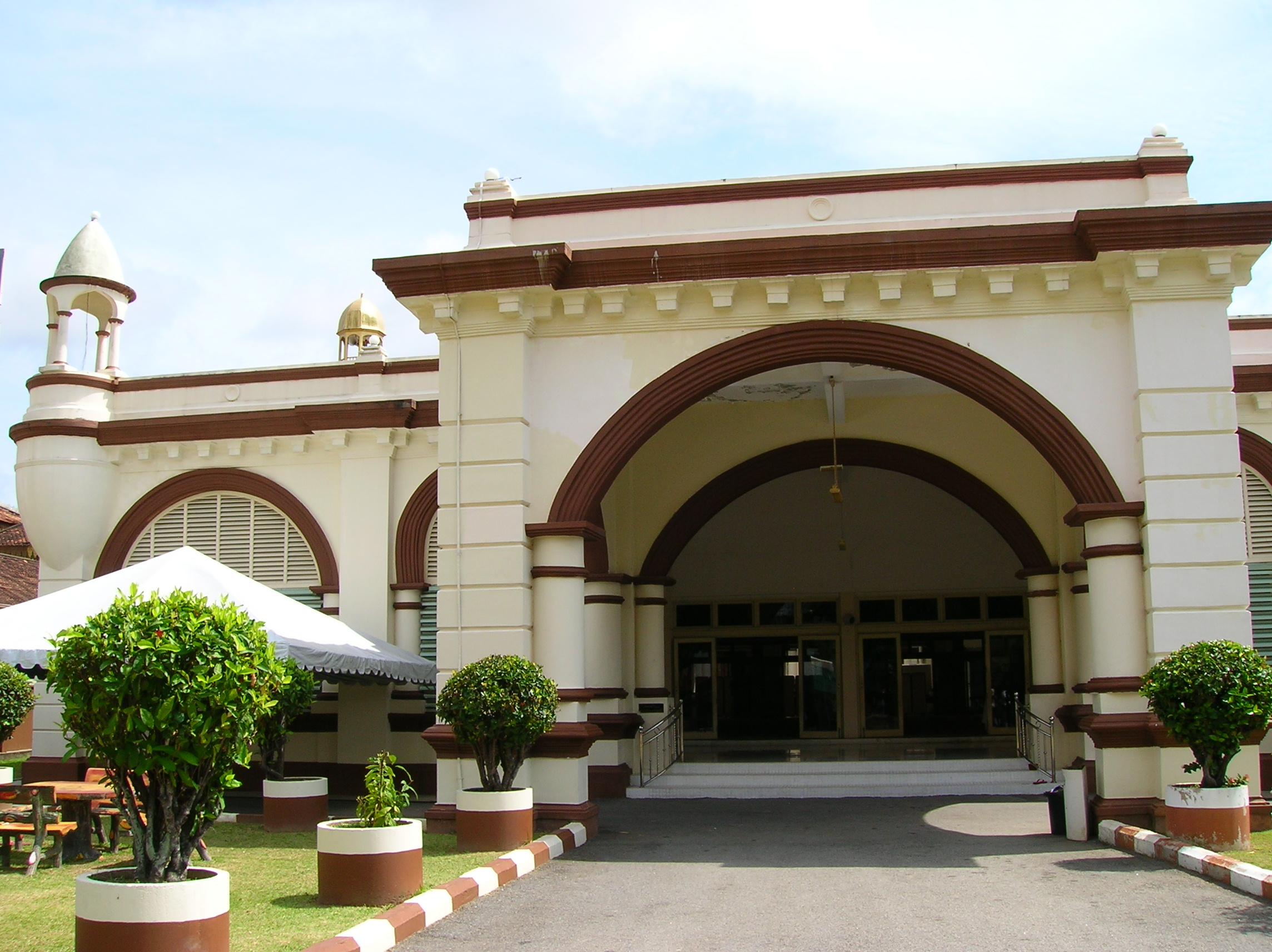
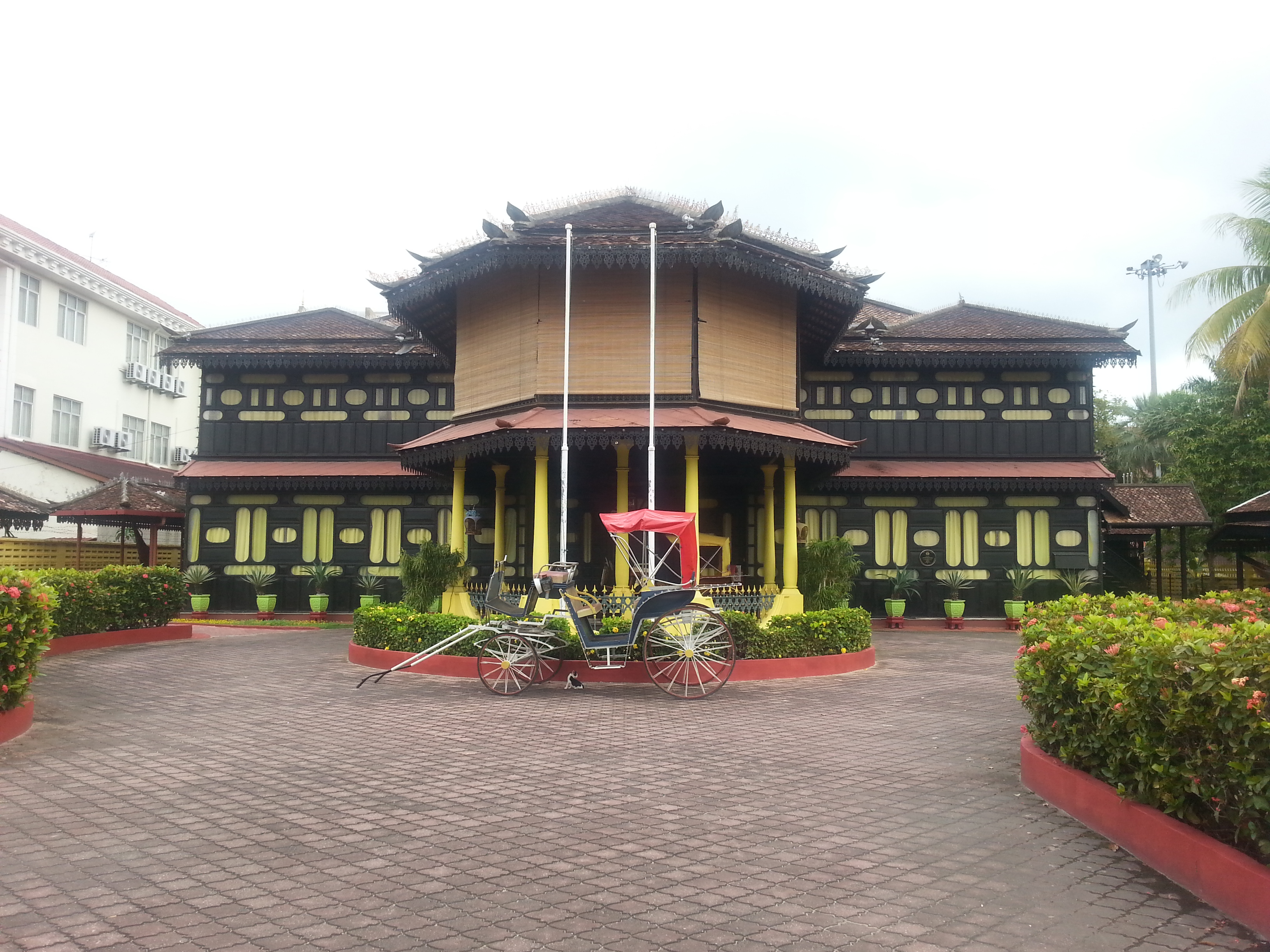
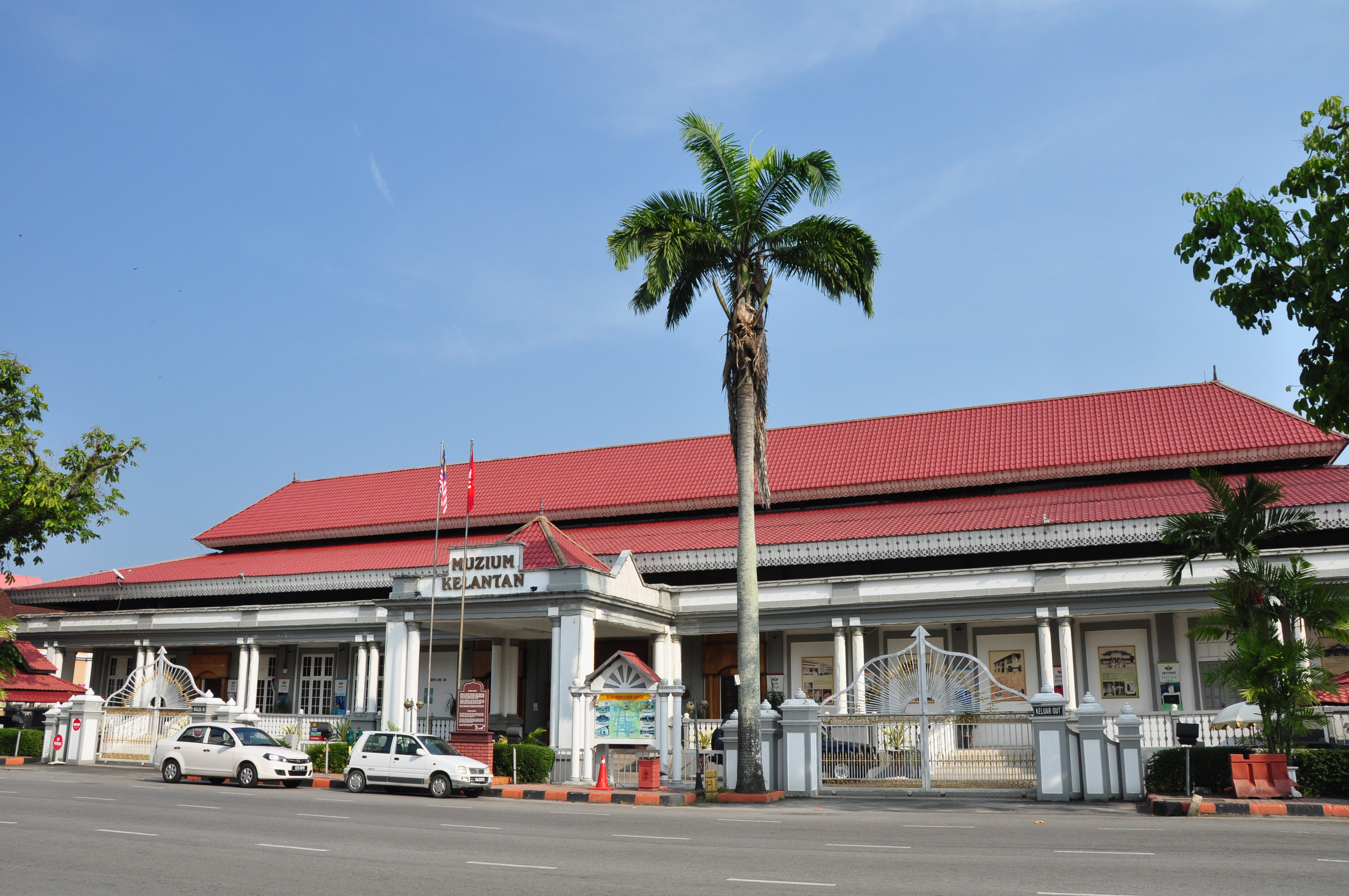
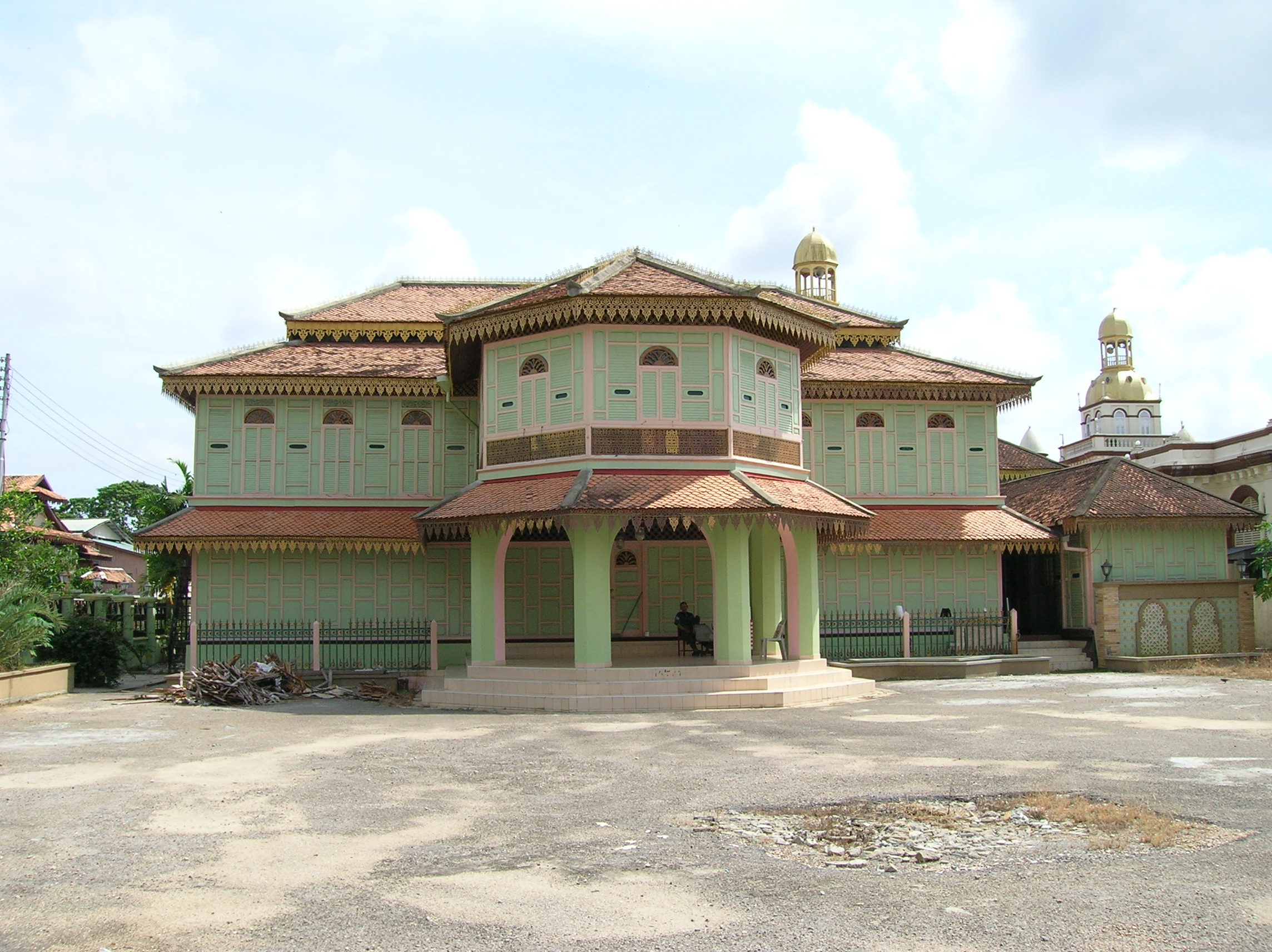
- Sultan Ismail Petra arch outside the Royal Palace Siti Khadijah Market Muhammadi Mosque Jahar Palace Kelantan Museum Kelantan Islamic Museum

- Seal
- Nicknames: The Islamic City (Bandar Raya Islam), The Cultural City (Kota Budaya)
- Interactive map of Kota Bharu
- Kota Bharu in Kelantan Kota Bharu (Malaysia) Kota Bharu (Southeast Asia) Kota Bharu (Asia)
- Coordinates: 6°8′N 102°15′E
- Country: Malaysia
- State: Kelantan
- District: Kota Bharu District
- First settled: 14 April 1844
- Establishment of the town council: 1936
- Establishment of the town board: 1971
- Municipality status: 1 January 1978
- Founder: Sultan Muhammad II

Government
  - Type: Municipal council
  - Body: Islamic City of Kota Bharu Municipal Council
  - President: Mohd Anis Bin Hussein (incumbent)
  - Municipal Secretary: Mohd Shaifudeen Bin Md Salleh

Area
  - Total: 115 km^{2} (44 sq mi)

Population (2022)
  - Total: 568,900
  - Density: 4,950/km^{2} (12,800/sq mi)
- Time zone: UTC+8 (MST)
  - Summer (DST): Not observed
- Postcode: 15xxx
- Area code: +60-09-7
- Website: mpkbbri.kelantan.gov.my

Kota Bharu (Kelantanese: Koto Baghu), colloquially referred to as KB, is a town in Malaysia that serves as the state capital and royal seat of Kelantan. It is situated in the northeastern part of Peninsular Malaysia and lies near the mouth of the Kelantan River.

The town is home to many religious buildings, various museums, the unique architecture of the old royal palaces (still occupied by the Sultan and Sultanah and off-limits to visitors but viewable from outside) and former royal buildings (which can be visited). It is served by Keretapi Tanah Melayu's East Coast Line at the nearby Wakaf Bharu Terminal Station, in the town of Wakaf Bharu across the Kelantan River and Sultan Ismail Petra Airport, located in Pengkalan Chepa.

== Etymology ==
Kota Bharu means "new city" or "new castle/fort" in Malay. The name of the city may also be written as Kota Baharu or Kota Bahru.

== History ==
Kota Bharu was founded during the late 19th century. Before the establishment, Kota Bharu was home to Kelantan's Royal Palace, then established by Sultan Muhammad II of Kelantan in 1844 as Kelantan's state capital who wanted the new state capital built in his honour. Prior to this, Kota Bharu was known as Kuala Kelantan. Before Kota Bharu assumed the role, the Kelantanese capital was divided into two which were Kota Kubang Labu and Kota Pengkalan Datu. During the 19th century, Kelantan was a prosperous and populous state with a population of around 30,000 to 50,000 people including a thousand Chinese. Production from within the state include gold, tin ore, black pepper, areca nut, rice, rattan, bamboo, agarwood and songket. Kota Bharu acts as entrepot for goods due to its strategic location beside the Kelantan River.

During World War II, Pantai Sabak, about 10 km (6.2 mi) from Kota Bharu, was the initial landing point of the Japanese invasion forces on 8 December 1941, beginning the Battle of Kota Bharu, the first battle of the Malayan campaign. Japanese forces captured the city and would go on to successfully engage the British in jungle warfare and ultimately capture Singapore.

Kota Bharu was declared as the "Cultural City" on 25 July 1991 by the late Sultan Ismail Petra on the basis of two important aspects – the history of Kota Bharu and the uniqueness of its local arts and cultures. Kota Bharu was rebranded as the "Islamic City" (Malay: Bandar Raya Islam) by the Kelantan State Government on 1 October 2005 through its "Developing With Islam" (Malay: Membangun Bersama Islam) policy.

== Government ==
Islamic City of Kota Bharu Municipal Council Majlis Perbandaran Kota Bharu Bandar Raya Islam مجليس ڤربندرن كوتا بهارو بندراي اسلام

Type
- Type: Local authority

History
- Founded: 1 January 1978

Leadership
- President: Rosnazli Bin Haji Amin
- Municipal Secretary: Mohd Shaifudeen Md Salleh

Meeting place
- Jalan Hospital, 15000 Kota Bharu, Kelantan

Website
- mpkbbri.kelantan.gov.my

Kota Bharu Municipal Council, officially known as the Islamic City of Kota Bharu Municipal Council (Malay: Majlis Perbandaran Kota Bharu Bandar Raya Islam, MPKB-BRI, Jawi: مجليس ڤربندرن كوتا بهارو بندراي اسلام) and formerly known as the Kota Bharu Town Council (Malay: Majlis Bandaran Kota Bharu) from 1936 until 1971 and the Kota Bharu Town Board (Malay: Lembaga Bandaran Kota Bharu) from 1971 until 1978, is the local authority of Kota Bharu.

== Demographics ==
The vast majority of Kota Bharu's population is ethnically Kelantanese Malay. The language spoken in Kota Bharu is Kelantan Malay dialect. There is also a fairly large Chinese population.

Ethnicities of Kota Bharu – 2020 Census
Ethnic group	Percent
Bumiputera	95.7%
Chinese	3.7%
Indians	0.3%
Others	0.3%
Population by percentage This excludes non-citizens which form 2.1% of Kota Bharu's population

=== Religion ===
Kota Bharu town's population is 93% Muslim, with the remainder consisting of Buddhists, Hindus and Christians. The predominantly urban local Chinese community mainly practices Buddhism.

Kota Bharu was declared an Islamic city on Saturday, 1 October 2005 at 10pm by the Sultan of Kelantan, DYMM Sultan Ismail Petra ibni al-Marhum Sultan Yahya Petra at the Sultan Mohammed IV Stadium. The inauguration was accompanied by a fireworks display as an inauguration gimmick and performances of poetry, dikir barat, nasyid and singing by special guests, namely Mawi, M. Nasir, Halim Yazid, Kumpulan Rabbani and Akhil Hayy. The inauguration was also witnessed by thousands of attendees who had to watch on screens installed in several places around Kota Bharu.

After the inauguration, the Kota Bharu Municipal Council (MPKB) was renamed the Islamic City of Kota Bharu Municipal Council (MPKB-BRI). However, this declaration did not mean that the city of Kota Bharu had received the status of a city like others, but simply called Kota Bharu a city with Islamic characteristics.

==== Religious House of Worship ====
- Church of Our Lady of Fatima of the Holy Rosary
- St. Martin’s Anglican Church
- Wakaf Bharu Presbyterian Church
- Gereja Presbyterian Kelantan
- Muhammadi Mosque
- An-Naim Mosque
- Long Yunus Royal Mosque
- Masjid Pakistan
- Sultan Muhammad II Mosque
- Sultan Mansor Mosque
- Masjid Mukim Kampung Pintu Geng
- Al-Taqwa Mosque
- Al-Karomah Mosque
- Arulmigu Subramaniyar Siva Temple

== Culture ==
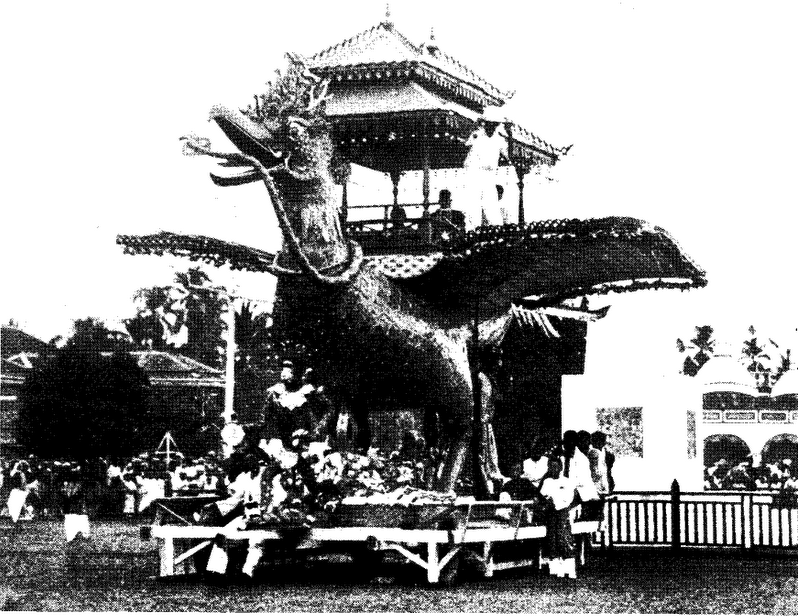
Burung Petala Indra, as seen in Padang Bank, Kota Bharu.

The Kelantanese culture is highly distinctive as compared to other states of Malaysia but also with some influences from Thailand due to its geographical proximity.

=== Food ===
Nasi berlauk, nasi dagang, nasi lemak and nasi kerabu are popular elements of the local cuisine. Sweet cakes, or kuih, are also popular amongst the Kelantanese. Other popular foods include nasi tumpang, etok, akok, lompat tikam & netbak.

== Climate ==
Kota Bharu features a tropical monsoon climate bordering on a tropical rainforest climate. Kota Bharu does not have a true dry season although the city experiences noticeably heavier rainfall from August through January. Also, Kota Bharu experiences slightly cooler temperatures between December and February than during the rest of the year. The city sees on average about 2,600 millimetres (100 in) of precipitation annually.

Climate data for Kota Bharu (1991–2020 normals)
Month	Jan	Feb	Mar	Apr	May	Jun	Jul	Aug	Sep	Oct	Nov	Dec	Year
Record high °C (°F)	33.4 (92.1)	33.0 (91.4)	34.9 (94.8)	35.6 (96.1)	36.4 (97.5)	35.6 (96.1)	35.7 (96.3)	35.2 (95.4)	35.0 (95.0)	34.8 (94.6)	33.6 (92.5)	32.4 (90.3)	36.4 (97.5)
Mean daily maximum °C (°F)	29.5 (85.1)	30.4 (86.7)	31.4 (88.5)	32.6 (90.7)	33.0 (91.4)	32.7 (90.9)	32.3 (90.1)	32.2 (90.0)	31.9 (89.4)	31.1 (88.0)	29.8 (85.6)	29.2 (84.6)	31.3 (88.3)
Daily mean °C (°F)	26.3 (79.3)	26.7 (80.1)	27.4 (81.3)	28.4 (83.1)	28.5 (83.3)	28.1 (82.6)	27.7 (81.9)	27.5 (81.5)	27.3 (81.1)	27.0 (80.6)	26.4 (79.5)	26.3 (79.3)	27.3 (81.1)
Mean daily minimum °C (°F)	23.6 (74.5)	23.5 (74.3)	24.0 (75.2)	24.7 (76.5)	24.9 (76.8)	24.6 (76.3)	24.3 (75.7)	24.0 (75.2)	23.9 (75.0)	24.0 (75.2)	23.9 (75.0)	23.8 (74.8)	24.1 (75.4)
Record low °C (°F)	16.7 (62.1)	17.8 (64.0)	17.8 (64.0)	18.3 (64.9)	21.7 (71.1)	21.1 (70.0)	20.6 (69.1)	21.1 (70.0)	20.6 (69.1)	20.6 (69.1)	18.9 (66.0)	18.9 (66.0)	16.7 (62.1)
Average precipitation mm (inches)	149.9 (5.90)	69.0 (2.72)	140.3 (5.52)	92.5 (3.64)	115.8 (4.56)	137.7 (5.42)	155.0 (6.10)	157.9 (6.22)	163.3 (6.43)	267.4 (10.53)	676.9 (26.65)	572.4 (22.54)	2,697.9 (106.22)
Average precipitation days (≥ 1.0 mm)	9.5	4.7	6.7	5.8	8.5	9.6	10.2	12.5	12.2	15.7	20.5	18.4	134.3
Average relative humidity (%)	84	84	83	82	83	83	83	84	84	86	88	87	84
Mean monthly sunshine hours	161	190	207	214	194	186	184	187	187	174	139	130	2,153
Source 1: World Meteorological Organization
Source 2: Ogimet Deutscher Wetterdienst (humidity)

== Transportation ==
=== Public transportation ===
Grab Car services, available for 24 hours a day, are provided in Kota Bharu since April 2017.

Kota Bharu is serviced by Sultan Ismail Petra Airport, the busiest airport in east coast of Peninsular Malaysia (IATA: KBR).

The closest railway station is the Wakaf Bharu station on the other side of the river, 6 km from the city centre.

The under construction MRL East Coast Rail Link will have a station at Kota Bharu. The Kota Bharu station will be located near Tunjong.

Local bus services in Kota Bharu are provided by BAS.MY Kota Bharu, operated by Konsortium E-Mutiara Berhad. The network comprises 16 routes connecting the city with its suburbs and surrounding towns, including Pengkalan Chepa, Tumpat, Pasir Mas, Rantau Panjang, Tanah Merah, Jeli, Bachok, Pasir Puteh, Machang, Kuala Krai and Gua Musang. Services also extend into Terengganu, serving Jerteh and Kampung Raja. Route D12 serves Sultan Ismail Petra Airport, while route D13 connects the city with Pantai Cahaya Bulan.

=== Roadways ===
Highway 8 is the main highway leading Kota Bharu to the federal capital Kuala Lumpur. Highway 3 connects Kota Bharu to Pasir Mas and the Thailand border in the west, or Kuala Terengganu, Kuantan or even Johor Bahru due south. Connection to Penang is possible via highway 4. The Lebuhraya Rakyat, or People's Expressway, is a planned expressway that is to connect Kota Bharu to Kuala Krai in southern Kelantan. The project has been integrated into the Central Spine Road project (assigned as highway 34), scheduled to be complete by 2020.

== Education ==
Notable educational establishments include Open University Malaysia, Universiti Tun Abdul Razak, MSU College and Wadi Sofia International School. However, the most plentiful type of school are national schools, which include

- Private schools
- Islamic religious schools
- National schools
- Chinese Type Primary and Secondary School
- Technical secondary schools: Sekolah Menengah Teknik (SMT)
- MRSM and SBP

Kota Bharu had Malaysia's only Carnegie library, founded in 1938 but opened to the public in 1967. In 1973, the Carnegie Public Library became known as Kelantan Public Library Corporation and moved to new premises in 1982. At the time of demolition, the Carnegie Free Library in Kota Bahru was one of only two original structures still standing, outside the United States

== Shopping ==
The most famous shopping destination in Kota Bharu is Siti Khadijah Market. Most of its sellers are women. Next to Central Market is the Kota Bharu Trade Centre (KBTC) which was opened in August 2009, with Parkson as the anchor tenants for the mall.

Other shopping centres in Kota Bharu are the KB Mall, Kota Seri Mutiara, G-Orange Mall, Pantai Timur and Platinum Mall. A Tesco supermarket opened in 2008, later renamed Lotus's. In March 2010, the Mydin Mall in Bandar Baru Kubang Kerian opened. AEON Mall in Lembah Sireh opened in April 2016. A new Giant Hypermarket located in Bandar Baru Tunjong was opened in 2016, as well as a Mydin store at Bandar Baru Tunjong by 2021.

== Tourism ==
=== Beaches ===
Strong surf threatens all major beaches in the vicinity of Kota Bharu with substantial erosion. The community has been implementing wave breakers by piling up massive amounts of boulders in an effort to protect the coastline. Regular beach activity has become impossible as visitors frequent beaches further south. In terms of tourism, the most famous beach in Kota Bharu is Pantai Cahaya Bulan.

=== Wreck diving ===
Diving in Kota Bharu is a relatively new activity. At present, only one dive shop operates in the area. Trips out to the wreck of the IJN Awazisan Maru (known locally as the "Japanese Invasion Wreck") are among the sites offered. This Japanese transport ship was the first vessel to sink in the Pacific War. The wreck is a 30-minute boat journey from a jetty which is 10 minutes outside of Kota Bharu.

== Notable people ==
Academician and corporate figures

- Omar Abdul Rahman
- Nik Safiah Karim

Athletes

- Badhri Radzi, footballer. Currently playing for Kelantan FA
- Hafiz Hashim, former national badminton player.
- Khairul Fahmi Che Mat, national football goalkeeper
- Luqman Hakim Shamsudin, footballer. Currently playing for KV Kortrijk
- Mohd Hashim Mustapha, former footballer
- Roslin Hashim, former national badminton player.
- Sidique Ali Merican, former sprinter.

Entertainers

- Aedy Ashraf
- Bienda
- Izzue Islam
- Issey Fazlisham
- Misha Omar
- Julia Rais
- Nelydia Senrose
- Neelofa
- Saharul Ridzuan

Politics

- Asri Muda
- Khalid Samad
- Mohamed Nasir
- Ng Yen Yen
- Nga Kor Ming
- Nik Ahmad Kamil
- Nik Aziz Nik Mat
- Tan Seng Giaw
- Tengku Razaleigh Hamzah
- Zaid Ibrahim
- Tengku Maimun Tuan Mat

== International relations ==
=== Sister city ===
As of 2018, Kota Bharu has one sister city:

- Kasaoka, Japan.
