= Kelantanese Malays =

Malay sub-ethnic in northern Malaysia

Oghe Nayu Klate ملايو كلنتن
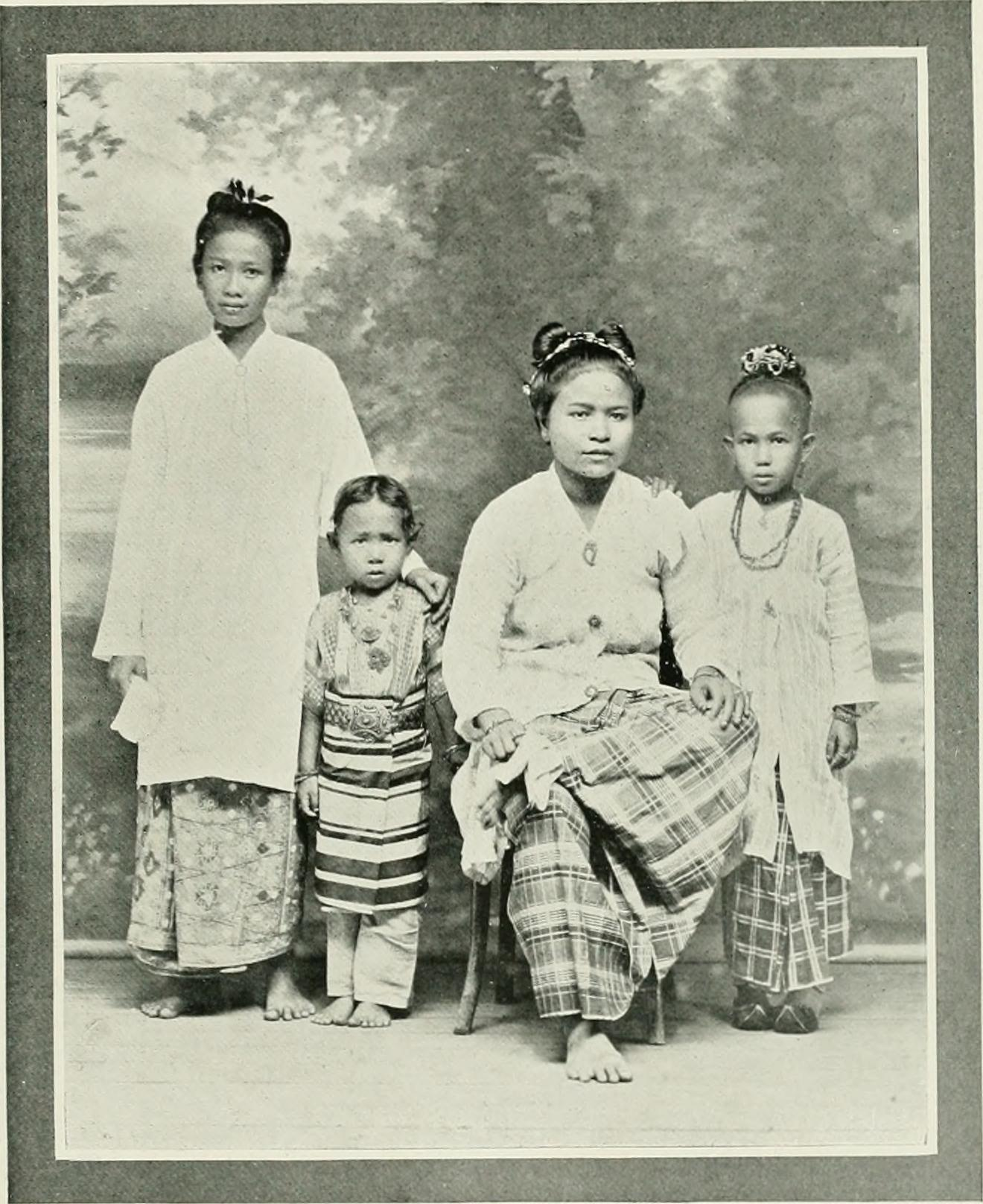
- A Kelantanese Malay woman with children in traditional attire, 1908.

Total population
- Between 2 million

Regions with significant populations
- Malaysia (Kelantan, Gerik and Besut); Thailand (Southern Thailand)

Languages
- Kelantan–Pattani Malay (native); Malay (in Malaysia); Thai, Southern Thai (in Thailand)

Religion
- Sunni Islam (Shafi'i branch)

Related ethnic groups
- Other Malays

Kelantanese Malays (Standard Malay: Orang Melayu Kelantan; Kelantan Malay: Oghe Nayu Klate) are a sub-ethnic group of Malays indigenous to the state of Kelantan, Malaysia as well as in Northern Terengganu (in the districts of Besut and Northern Setiu). The Kelantanese Malays are closely related to Thai Malays (especially those in Pattani, Narathiwat, Yala, and some parts in Songkhla and Phatthalung provinces) and Terengganuan Malays in neighbouring Terengganu, these two Malay sub-ethnic groups shared historical, cultural and linguistic as well as kinship ties with the Kelantanese Malays. Kelantanese Malays form 94% of Kelantan's population, which makes them the largest ethnic group in Kelantan (other ethnic groups also lives in the state such as Kelantanese Chinese and Peranakans, Siamese, Tamils, Temiars and others) and around 150,000 in Besut, Terengganu.

The Kelantanese Malays, along with Terengganuan Malays and Pahang Malays (and sometimes Thai Malays and the Malays of Anambas Islands and Natuna Islands in Indonesia) are collectively referred to as the Orang Pantai Timur 'People of the East Coast' which have a distinct identity than those of other parts of Malaysia, especially those in the North, South and Western coasts of Peninsular Malaysia.

== Genetics ==
A research on population genetic structure of Malay sub-ethnic groups published in 2011 revealed that Kelantanese Malays formed a separate independent clade, suggesting that Kelantanese Malay had an ancestry that is more divergent than any other Malay sub-ethnic groups. This means, there might be evidence that the Kelantanese Malays are genetically different from other Malay populations. It was suggested that there are two explanations to the findings. First, the geolocation of the cradle of Kelantanese in the northeast of the Malaysian peninsula, separated by Titiwangsa mountain range, accounted for their limited links to the Indonesian Archipelago. The other explanation is that the sub-ethnic group might be an admixture with the Indian population in ancient times during the early existence of the Malays. There is also evidence of admixture with the Cham people who migrated from their homeland in present-day southern and central Vietnam after the fall of Champa, especially after the conquest of Panduranga, the Champa city-state by the Dai Viet in the 17th to 19th centuries.

== Language ==
Kelantanese Malays speak a highly divergent Kelantanese Malay, also known as baso Kelate or kecek Kelate by its native speakers. The language is known for its "e" and "o" sounds which is very different from standard Malay. One of the examples are saye 'love' but in Standard Malay it is called sayang and mano 'where' but in Standard Malay it is mana. Kelantanese Malay has its own distinct grammar and vocabulary which makes other Malay speakers (except those in Terengganu and Southern Thailand) find it very difficult to understand. Kelantan-Pattani Malay has its own ISO 639-3 code "mfa". Kelantanese Malay has its own regional dialects but still mutually intelligible to one another, it is also spoken natively in Besut and Setiu (Terengganu) and similar varieties can be found in neighbouring Perak and Kedah but the latter two are considered variants of Pattani dialects instead of Kelantanese.

== Culture ==
Kelantan is known by many as the "Cradle of the Malay civilization" in Peninsular Malaysia. Its culture is unique and different from those of other Malay sub-ethnic groups other than those in Southern Thailand. Due to their historic and geographic location, it also has considerable influences from Indian, Thai and even Cham cultures, especially during Hindu-Buddhist times. After the arrival of Islam in the region, the Kelantanese have been affiliated themselves with Islam and considered Islam as part of their culture (much like other Malays, Minangkabaus and Acehnese ethnic groups). Kelantan today is one of the most conservative states in Malaysia and the state has been under the Pan-Malaysian Islamic Party since 1990. However, Kelantan is also known for its tolerance towards other religions and ethnic groups. There are many giant Buddhist statues all across the state as well as Christian churches and Hindu temples as well as indigenous religions of Orang Asli can still be seen in the state. The level of assimilation between Kelantanese ethnic groups is unique in Malaysia because they all share the sense of strong united Kelantanese identity.

Different styles of traditional Kelantanese Malay attire

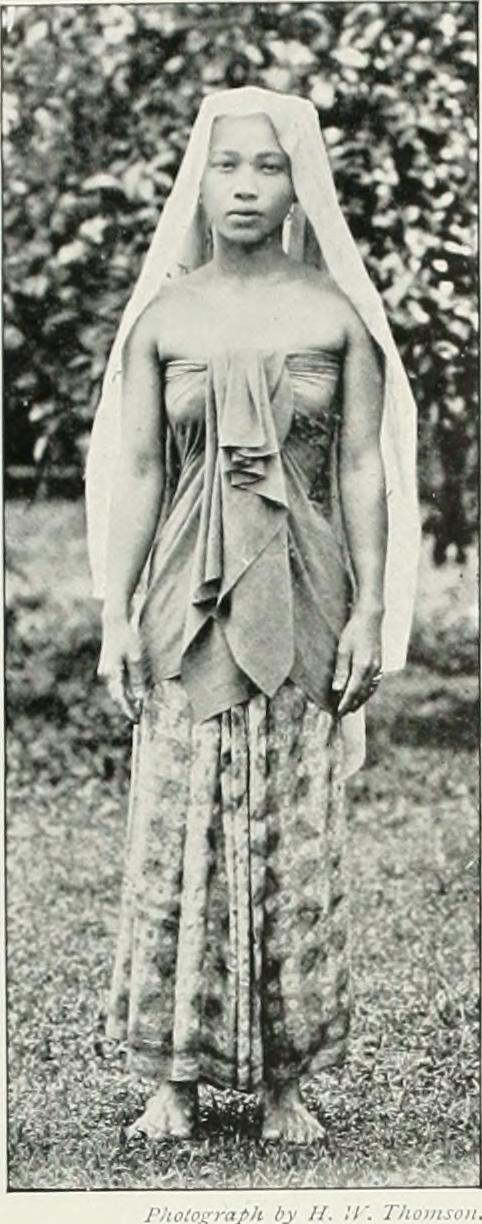
Wearing a broad sash (kain lepas) with a Terengganuan style of flowered sarong.

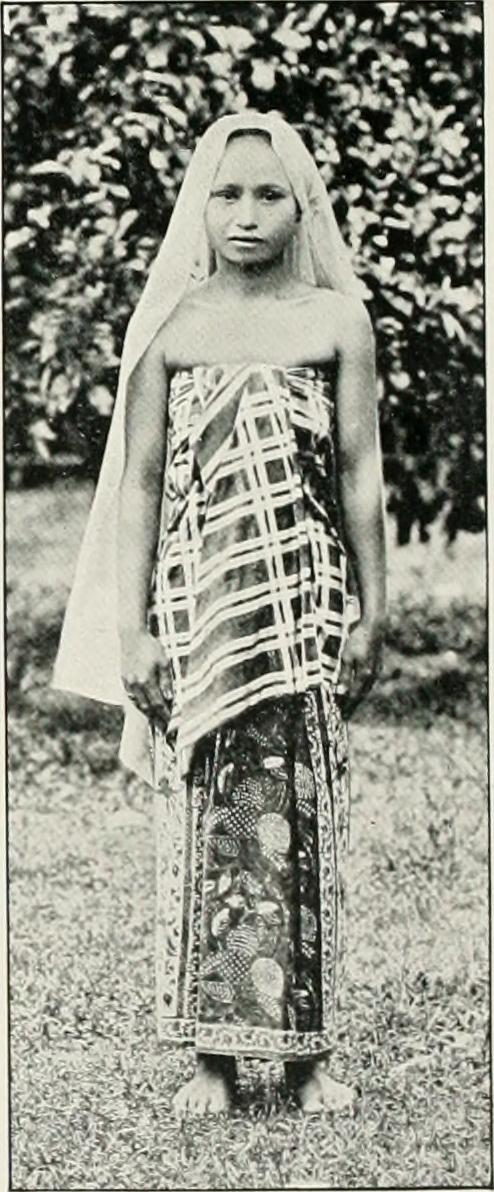
Dressed in flowered sarong and with a Kelantanese style of check pattern kain lepas.

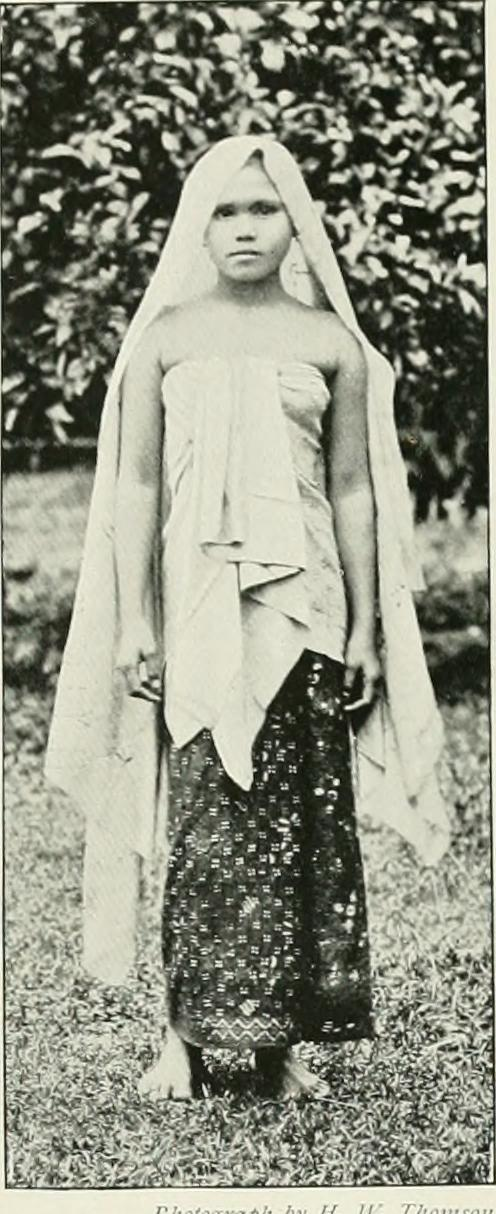
Wearing a Kelantanese style sarong with a typical kain lepas girt about the breast.

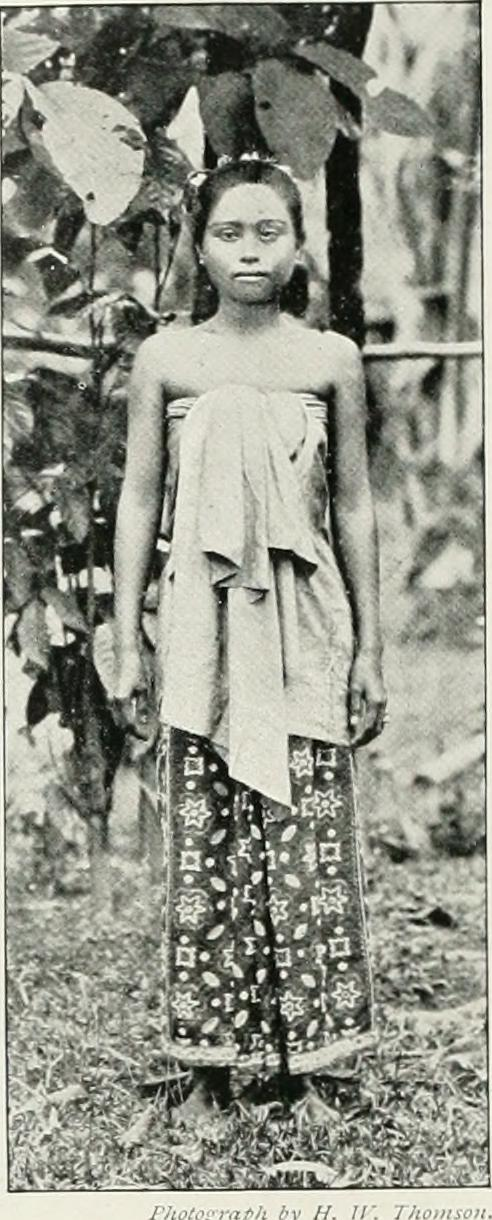
A kain lepas draped about the breast (kain kemban) over a flowered sarong with decorative flowers in hair.

=== Architecture ===
- Rumah Tiang Dua Belas

=== Cuisine ===
There are a variety of Kelantanese Malay cuisine that includes:-

- Akok, made of eggs and brown sugar.
- Ayam Percik, roasted chicken served with coconut milk sauce.
- Buah Tanjung, made of eggs, flour and sugar. Also a royal dish.
- Budu (sauce)
- Roasted Etok
- Jala Mas, similar taste to Buah Tanjung. Main ingredients are eggs and sugar. Also a royal dish.
- Kerutuk Daging
- Kuzi Ayam
- Laksam, made from rice flour and served with coconut milk broth and Ulam (salad).
- Lempok
- Lompat Tikam, a dessert dish made from rice flour, sugar and Pandan leaf extract.
- Nasi kerabu
- Nasi dagang
- Nasi tumpang
- Puteri Mandi, made of sticky rice and served with sweeten grated coconut.
- Serunding Daging
- Tahi Itek, made of eggs, coconut milk and sugar.

=== Craft ===
- Songket Kelantan
- Wau bulan
- Gasing

=== Dance ===
Among the popular traditional Kelantanese Malay dance are such as:-

- Tarian Asyik
- Tarian Hala

=== Theater ===
- Main Puteri, a form of entertainment and also healing or exorcism.
- Mak Yong
- Menora (dance)
- Wayang Kulit

=== Music ===
- Dikir barat
- Kertok
- Rebana Ubi
- Serunai Gendang

=== Martial arts ===
- Tomoi

== Notable people ==
- Ahmad Yaakob, politician and former Menteri Besar of Kelantan.
- Aisha Retno, singer-songwriter and actress (paternal descent with mixed Arab ancestry).
- Haji Mohd Hassan bin Munas, a resistor of colonial British Malaya famously known as Tok Janggut.
- Katip Sumat, Cham–Kelantanese Malay cleric and war leader.
- Mohd Badhri Mohd Radzi, Malaysian footballer.
- Mohd Daudsu Jamaluddin, Malaysian footballer.
- Mohd Farisham Ismail, Malaysian footballer.
- Mohd Khairul Izuan Rosli, Malaysian footballer.
- Mohd Qayyum Marjoni Sabil, Malaysian footballer.
- Nik Abdul Aziz Nik Mat, politician, Muslim cleric and former Menteri Besar of Kelantan.
- Nik Shahrul Azim Abdul Halim, Malaysian footballer.
- Wan Khalmizam, Malaysian professional archer.
- Wan Kuzri, Malaysian-American footballer.
- Wan Kuzain, Malaysian-American footballer.
- Wan Ahmad Fayshal Wan Ahmad Kamal, Malaysian politician.
- Wan Zaharulnizam Zakaria, Malaysian footballer.
- Khairul Fahmi Che Mat, Malaysian footballer.
- Ahmad Muin Yaacob, Malaysian convicted murderer.
- Rozman Jusoh, Malaysian convicted drug trafficker.
- Misha Omar, Malaysian actress and singer.
- Mustapa Mohamed, Malaysian politician and economist.
- Mohamed Yaacob, Malaysian lawyer and politician.
- Tuan Ibrahim Tuan Man, Malaysian politician and ulema.
