= List of tourist attractions in Kelantan =

Tourist attractions in Kelantan, Malaysia

This is the list of tourist attractions in Kelantan, Malaysia.

== Museums ==
- Museum of Royal Traditions and Customs Istana Jahar
- Istana Batu Royal Museum
- Kelantan Islamic Museum
- Kelantan Museum
- Handicraft Village and Craft Museum

== Religious places ==
- Kampung Laut Mosque
- Sultan Ismail Petra Silver Jubilee Mosque
- Wat Machimmaram
- Wat Phothivihan
- Wat Uttamaram
- Tokong Swee Nyet Keung (Tokong Mek)
- Masjid Muhammadi

== Shopping centers ==
- Siti Khadijah Market

== Sport venues ==
- Sultan Mohammad IV Stadium

== See also ==
- List of tourist attractions in Malaysia
