= List of schools in Kelantan =

This is a list of schools in Kelantan, Malaysia. It is categorised according to the variants of schools in Malaysia, and is arranged alphabetically.

== Private schools ==
=== Chinese Independent High School ===
- Chung Hwa Independent High School

=== Maahad Tahfiz ===
- Maahad Al-Quran Dan Bahasa Arab Al-Manar
- Maahad Tahfiz Al Hashimi

=== International schools ===
- Kelantan International School
- Wadi Sofia International School

== Islamic religious schools ==
=== Secondary education: Sekolah Menengah Kebangsaan Agama (SMKA) ===
- SMK Agama Falahiah
- SMK Agama Melor
- SMK Agama Naim Lilbanat
- SMK Agama Wataniah
- SMK Agama Lati
- SMK Agama Tok Bachok
- SMA Tengku Amalin A'ishah Putri

=== Kelantan Islamic foundation (YIK) secondary education ===
- Mahaad Muhammadi Rantau Panjang
- Maahad Muhammadi Lelaki
- Maahad Muhammadi perempuan
- Maahad Pengajian Islam
- Maahad Muhammadi Gua Musang
- Maahad Muhammadi Tumpat
- Maahad Muhammadi Pasir Mas
- Maahad Saniah Pasir Puteh
- Maahad Syamsul Maarif (L)
- SMU(A) Tarbiah Diniah Tahfiz Bunut Sarang Burung
- Maahad Tahfiz Sains Bustanul Ariffin

== National schools ==
=== Primary education: Sekolah Kebangsaan (SK) ===
- SK Badak
- SK Banggol Guchil
- SK Batu Gajah, Tanah Merah
- SK Bendang Pauh
- SK Bendang Pa'Yong
- SK Berangan
- SK Bukit Jering
- SK Bukit Panau
- SK Bukit Tiu
- SK Chiku 07
- SK Dato' Hashim imran (1)
- SK Dato' Hashim (2)
- SK Geting
- SK Gua Musang
- SK Gual Jedok, Tanah Merah
- SK Gual Tinggi
- SK Islah
- SK Ismail Petra
- SK Kangkong, Pasir Mas
- SK Kota Jembal
- SK Kampung keling
- SK Mulong (1)
- SK Mulong (2)
- SK Kedai Piah
- SK Kelaparan
- SK Kelar, Pasir Mas
- SK Kemumin
- SK Kolam
- SK Ladang Kerilla
- SK Lalang Pepuyu
- SK Laloh
- SK Lundang
- SK Mentuan
- SK Merbau
- SK Pengkalan Chengal
- SK Pak Badol
- SK Panji
- SK Pengkalan Chepa
- SK Kedondong, Pasir Mas
- SK Raja Bahar
- SK Rantau Panjang (1)
- SK Rantau Panjang (2)
- SK Semut Api
- SK Sri Rantau Panjang
- SK Sri Wakaf Bharu, Tumpat
- SK Seri Chempaka
- SK Sri Neting
- SK Sri Suria (1)
- SK Sri Suria (2)
- SK Pendek
- SK Pengkalan Kubor (1)
- SK Pengkalan Kubor (2)
- SK Banggol Chicha
- SK Sri Suria (3)
- SK Sultan Ibrahim (1)
- SK Sultan Ibrahim (2)
- SK Sultan Ibrahim (3)
- SK Sultan Ismail (1)
- SK Sultan Ismail (2)
- SK Sultan Ismail (3)
- SK Sultan Ismail (4)
- SK Sultan Yahya Petra 1 (SK SYP1)
- SK Sultan Yahya Petra 2 (SK SYP2)
- SK Sungai Tapang
- SK Tanah Merah (1)
- SK Tanah Merah (2)
- SK Tapang
- SK Telekong
- SK Tengku Indera Petra
- SK Seri Ketereh
- SK Sri Beban
- SK Othman Talib (1)
- SK Othman Talib (2)
- SK Seri Kota
- SK Katok
- SK Kubang Kerian (1)
- SK Kubang Kerian (2)
- SK Kubang Kerian(3)
- SK Zainab (1)
- SK Zainab (2)
- SK Jeli (1), Jeli
- SK Jeli (2)
- SK Kamil, Pasir Puteh
- SK Salor
- SK Bukit Gading
- SK Kota
- SK To'Uban, Pasir Mas
- SK Bukit Jarum, Pasir Mas
- SK Kampung Baru, Pasir Mas
- SK Kepas, Pasir Mas
- SK Banggol Petai, Pasir Mas
- SK Bukit Perah, Pasir Mas
- SK Chicha Tinggi, Pasir Mas
- SK Kok Pauh, Rantau Panjang
- SK Paloh Pintu Gang, Kota Bharu
- SK Pantai Senok, Bachok
- SK Pangkal Jenereh, Machang
- SK Teluk Jering, Tumpat
- SK Sungai Terah, Gua Musang
- SK Pos Brooke, Lojing
- SK Blau, Lojing

=== Secondary education: Sekolah Menengah Kebangsaan (SMK) ===
School code	School name	Postcode	Area	Coordinates
DEB1137	Maktab Sultan Ismail	15150	Kota Bharu	6.1066°N 102.2510°E
DEA4288	SMK (Agama) Dato' Ismail	16800	Pasir Puteh	5.8122°N 102.4740°E
DEA2190	SMK Abdul Samad	16600	Pulai Chondong	5.8569°N 102.2290°E
DEA5419	SMK Alor Pasir	17500	Tanah Merah	5.8819°N 102.1240°E
DEA9001	SMK Ayer Lanas	17700	Jeli	5.7831°N 101.8870°E
DEE0039	SMK Bachok	16300	Bachok	6.0514°N 102.3950°E
DEA0033	SMK Badak	16310	Bachok	6.0220°N 102.4010°E
DEA1152	SMK Badang	15350	Kota Bharu	6.1838°N 102.2820°E
DEA8002	SMK Bandar Chiku	18300	Gua Musang	4.9809°N 102.2030°E
DEA7423	SMK Bandar Kuala Krai	18000	Kuala Krai	5.5352°N 102.2147°E
DEA2194	SMK Bandar Machang	18500	Machang	5.7763°N 102.2046°E
DEA3429	SMK Baroh Pial	17200	Rantau Panjang	5.9475°N 102.0060°E
DEA9004	SMK Batu Melintang	17600	Jeli	5.7055°N 101.7300°E
DEA5424	SMK Belimbing	17500	Tanah Merah	5.8572°N 102.1690°E
DEA6364	SMK Berangan	16200	Tumpat	6.1503°N 102.1870°E
DEA0031	SMK Beris Panchor	16320	Bachok	6.1096°N 102.3510°E
DEA0044	SMK Beris Panchor 2	16320	Bachok	6.1407°N 102.3416°E
DEA5422	SMK Bukit Bunga	17500	Tanah Merah	5.8308°N 101.8970°E
DEA4286	SMK Bukit Jawa	16810	Pasir Puteh	5.8943°N 102.3260°E
DEA3239	SMK Bunut Susu	17020	Pasir Mas	6.1015°N 102.1830°E
DEA6357	SMK Chabang Empat	16210	Tumpat	6.1576°N 102.1530°E
DEA4294	SMK Cherang Ruku	16700	Pasir Puteh	5.8621°N 102.4910°E
DEA3238	SMK Chetok	17060	Pasir Mas	5.9207°N 102.1870°E
DEA8007	SMK Chiku 2	18300	Gua Musang	4.9074°N 102.1720°E
DEB1138	SMJK Chung Cheng	15300	Kota Bharu	6.1373°N 102.2410°E
DEB1139	SMJK Chung Hwa	15300	Kota Bharu	6.1375°N 102.2390°E
DEA7418	SMK Dabong	18200	Dabong	5.3789°N 102.0110°E
DEA6358	SMK Dato Biji Wangsa	16200	Tumpat	6.1909°N 102.1620°E
DEA1126	SMK Dato' Ahmad Maher	15200	Kota Bharu	6.1162°N 102.2580°E
DEE5324	SMK Dato' Mahmud Paduka Raja (1)	17500	Tanah Merah	5.8052°N 102.1450°E
DEA5423	SMK Dato' Mahmud Paduka Raja (2)	17500	Tanah Merah	5.7840°N 102.1480°E
DEA0040	SMK Dato' Perdana	16300	Bachok	6.0116°N 102.3930°E
DEA1138	SMK Dewan Beta	15100	Kota Bharu	6.0059°N 102.2000°E
DEA4291	SMK Gaal	16800	Pasir Puteh	5.7969°N 102.4130°E
DEA6363	SMK Geting	16080	Pengkalan Kubor	6.2176°N 102.1180°E
DEA3426	SMK Gual Periok	17200	Rantau Panjang	6.0237°N 102.0190°E
DEE2191	SMK Hamzah	18500	Machang	5.7644°N 102.2210°E
DEA2193	SMK Hamzah (2)	18500	Machang	5.7659°N 102.2440°E
DEA5325	SMK Ipoh	17500	Tanah Merah	5.7470°N 102.0520°E
DEA1123	SMK Ismail Petra	15300	Kota Bharu	6.1340°N 102.2480°E
DEA0036	SMK Jelawat	16370	Bachok	6.0100°N 102.3700°E
DEA9002	SMK Jeli	17600	Jeli	5.7020°N 101.8440°E
DEA9005	SMK Jeli 2	17610	Kuala Balah	5.5758°N 101.8811°E
DEA4292	SMK Jeram	16800	Pasir Puteh	5.7854°N 102.3560°E
DEA1124	SMK Kadok	16450	Kota Bharu	5.9920°N 102.2450°E
DEE4289	SMK Kamil	16800	Pasir Puteh	5.8390°N 102.3950°E
DEA6359	SMK Kampong Laut	16040	Tumpat	6.1566°N 102.2280°E
DEA3430	SMK Kampung Dangar	17000	Pasir Mas	6.0546°N 102.1270°E
DEA0039	SMK Kandis	16310	Bachok	5.9580°N 102.4380°E
DEA3240	SMK Kangkong	17040	Pasir Mas	5.9948°N 102.1840°E
DEA1122	SMK Kedai Buloh	15350	Kota Bharu	6.1770°N 102.2510°E
DEA3427	SMK Kedondong	17010	Pasir Mas	6.0968°N 102.1350°E
DEA5420	SMK Kemahang	17510	Tanah Merah	5.8527°N 102.0100°E
DEA1140	SMK Kemumin	16100	Kota Bharu	6.1475°N 102.3130°E
DEA7405	SMK Keroh	18000	Kuala Krai	5.6293°N 102.2050°E
DEE1126	SMK Ketereh	16450	Kota Bharu	5.9454°N 102.2480°E
DEA1148	SMK Kg Chengal	16450	Kota Bharu	5.9784°N 102.2630°E
DEA1142	SMK Kok Lanas	16450	Kota Bharu	5.9222°N 102.2400°E
DEE1127	SMK Kota	15100	Kota Bharu	6.0843°N 102.2340°E
DEE1140	SMK Kota Bharu	15300	Kota Bharu	6.1344°N 102.2500°E
DEA9003	SMK Kuala Balah	17610	Kuala Balah	5.4268°N 101.9110°E
DEA7407	SMK Kuala Krai	18000	Kuala Krai	5.5584°N 102.2010°E
DEA3428	SMK Kubang Bemban	17000	Pasir Mas	6.0587°N 102.1350°E
DEA0043	SMK Kubang Golok	16300	Bachok	6.1042°N 102.3790°E
DEA1129	SMK Kubang Kerian	16150	Kota Bharu	6.0929°N 102.2780°E
DEA1141	SMK Kubang Kerian 2	16150	Kota Bharu	6.0760°N 102.2810°E
DEA1153	SMK Kubang Kerian 3	16150	Kota Bharu	6.1118°N 102.2842°E
DEA0041	SMK Kubang Telaga	16390	Bachok	5.9319°N 102.3570°E
DEA6365	SMK Kutan	16250	Tumpat	6.0997°N 102.2090°E
DEA5418	SMK Ladang Kerilla	17500	Tanah Merah	5.6925°N 102.1030°E
DEA7420	SMK Laloh	18000	Kuala Krai	5.3111°N 102.2720°E
DEA1128	SMK Long Gafar	16150	Kota Bharu	6.0451°N 102.2820°E
DEA1154	SMK Long Ghafar 2	16150	Kota Bharu	6.0416°N 102.2817°E
DEA0034	SMK Long Yunus	16350	Bachok	6.0770°N 102.3680°E
DEA2189	SMK Machang	18500	Machang	5.7785°N 102.2160°E
DEA6360	SMK Mahmud Mahyidin	16250	Wakaf Bharu	6.1163°N 102.2160°E
DEA7408	SMK Manek Urai	18050	Kuala Krai	5.3782°N 102.2350°E
DEE1130	SMK Melor	16400	Kota Bharu	5.9700°N 102.2950°E
DEA7421	SMK Mengkebang	18000	Kuala Krai	5.5112°N 102.2730°E
DEA3242	SMK Meranti	17010	Pasir Mas	6.1014°N 102.1050°E
DEA1131	SMK Mulong	16010	Kota Bharu	6.0365°N 102.2360°E
DEA0032	SMK Nipah	16300	Bachok	6.0543°N 102.4020°E
DEA1151	SMK Padang Enggang	15100	Kota Bharu	6.0787°N 102.2470°E
DEA1150	SMK Padang Kala	16400	Kota Bharu	5.9938°N 102.2910°E
DEA4295	SMK Padang Pak Amat	16800	Pasir Puteh	5.8365°N 102.3670°E
DEA7419	SMK Pahi	18000	Kuala Krai	5.4798°N 102.2240°E
DEA0037	SMK Pak Badol	16400	Kota Bharu	5.9424°N 102.3050°E
DEA8003	SMK Paloh	18300	Gua Musang	5.0036°N 102.2360°E
DEA1155	SMK Panchor Perdana	16100	Kota Bharu	6.1335°N 102.2990°E
DEA1132	SMK Pangkal Kalong	16450	Kota Bharu	5.9179°N 102.2180°E
DEA2187	SMK Pangkal Meleret	18500	Machang	5.7790°N 102.1580°E
DEA1137	SMK Panji	16100	Kota Bharu	6.1238°N 102.2950°E
DEA3243	SMK Pasir Mas	17000	Pasir Mas	6.0476°N 102.1400°E
DEA1145	SMK Penambang	15350	Kota Bharu	6.1482°N 102.2390°E
DEE1133	SMK Pengkalan Chepa	16100	Kota Bharu	6.1621°N 102.2830°E
DEA1146	SMK Pengkalan Chepa 2	16100	Kota Bharu	6.1554°N 102.2980°E
DEA1139	SMK Pintu Geng	15100	Kota Bharu	6.0993°N 102.2330°E
DEA1134	SMK Putera	15300	Kota Bharu	6.1345°N 102.2470°E
DEA1135	SMK Puteri	15300	Kota Bharu	6.1333°N 102.2500°E
DEA0035	SMK Puteri Saadong	16030	Kota Bharu	6.0385°N 102.3160°E
DEA1125	SMK Raja Sakti	16150	Kota Bharu	6.1164°N 102.3060°E
DEE3244	SMK Rantau Panjang	17200	Rantau Panjang	6.0141°N 101.9740°E
DEA1136	SMK Salor	15100	Kota Bharu	6.0387°N 102.1930°E
DEA4298	SMK Selising	16810	Pasir Puteh	5.8987°N 102.3160°E
DEA4297	SMK Seri Aman	16800	Pasir Puteh	5.8415°N 102.3890°E
DEA2188	SMK Seri Intan	18500	Machang	5.6908°N 102.2140°E
DEA1147	SMK Sering	16150	Kota Bharu	6.1318°N 102.3210°E
DEA0038	SMK Sri Gunung	16390	Bachok	5.9924°N 102.3520°E
DEA3422	SMK Sri Kiambang	17070	Pasir Mas	6.0232°N 102.0930°E
DEA4293	SMK Sri Maharaja	16810	Pasir Puteh	5.8664°N 102.3380°E
DEA8008	SMK Sri Wangi	18300	Gua Musang	4.7919°N 101.9742°E
DEE3247	SMK Sultan Ibrahim (1)	17000	Pasir Mas	6.0481°N 102.1420°E
DEA3425	SMK Sultan Ibrahim (2)	17000	Pasir Mas	6.0455°N 102.1380°E
DEE1141	SMK Sultan Ismail	15150	Kota Bharu	6.1081°N 102.2500°E
DEE7409	SMK Sultan Yahya Petra 1	18000	Kuala Krai	5.5333°N 102.2060°E
DEA7422	SMK Sultan Yahya Petra 2	18000	Kuala Krai	5.5404°N 102.1970°E
DEA8004	SMK Sungai Asap	18300	Gua Musang	4.9655°N 102.0800°E
DEA4299	SMK Sungai Petai	16800	Pasir Puteh	5.8171°N 102.4600°E
DEA6361	SMK Sungai Pinang	16040	Tumpat	6.1766°N 102.2310°E
DEA5416	SMK Tan Sri Mohamed Yaacob	17510	Tanah Merah	5.8152°N 101.9800°E
DEA5417	SMK Tanah Merah (1)	17500	Tanah Merah	5.8102°N 102.1340°E
DEA5421	SMK Tanah Merah (2)	17500	Tanah Merah	5.8109°N 102.1350°E
DEA3431	SMK Tanjong Bunga	17030	Pasir Mas	6.0553°N 102.1870°E
DEA1149	SMK Tanjong Chat	15300	Kota Bharu	6.1468°N 102.2479°E
DEA1143	SMK Tanjung Mas	15400	Kota Bharu	6.1454°N 102.2590°E
DEA2192	SMK Temangan	18400	Temangan	5.6888°N 102.1510°E
DEA3245	SMK Tendong	17030	Pasir Mas	6.0682°N 102.2070°E
DEA8005	SMK Tengku Bendahara	18300	Gua Musang	5.1663°N 102.0070°E
DEA8001	SMK Tengku Indra Petra	18300	Gua Musang	4.8753°N 101.9640°E
DEA8006	SMK Tengku Indra Petra 2	18300	Gua Musang	4.8392°N 101.9570°E
DEA3241	SMK Tengku Panglima Raja	17000	Pasir Mas	6.0235°N 102.1470°E
DEA0042	SMK Teratak Pulai	16370	Bachok	6.0098°N 102.3450°E
DEA3246	SMK To' Uban	17050	Pasir Mas	5.9715°N 102.1450°E
DEA4287	SMK Tok Janggut	16800	Pasir Puteh	5.8342°N 102.3890°E
DEE6362	SMK Tumpat	16200	Tumpat	6.1895°N 102.1600°E
DEA6362	SMK Wakaf Bharu	16250	Wakaf Bharu	6.1171°N 102.1970°E
DEB1142	SMK Zainab (1)	15150	Kota Bharu	6.1066°N 102.2540°E
DEA1144	SMK Zainab 2	15300	Kota Bharu	6.1337°N 102.2390°E

=== Secondary education: Sekolah Menengah Jenis Kebangsaan (SMJK) ===
School code	School name	Postcode	Area	Coordinates
DEB1138	SMJK Chung Cheng	15300	Kota Bharu	6.1373°N 102.2410°E
DEB1139	SMJK Chung Hwa	15300	Kota Bharu	6.1375°N 102.2390°E

== Chinese national-type schools (also known as Jenis Kebangsaan (C) schools) ==
=== Chinese Primary School ===
- SJK (C) CHUNG CHENG
- SJK (C) CHUNG HWA KOTA BAHRU
- SJK (C) CHUNG HWA MACHANG
- SJK (C) KAI CHIH
- SJK (C) KHAY BOON
- SJK (C) PEI HWA
- SJK (C) PEIR CHIH
- SJK (C) POEY SIT
- SJK (C) POY HWA
- SJK (C) YOK ENG
- SJK (C) YUK CHAI
- SJK (C) YUK CHENG
- SJK (C) YUK TSE
- SJK (C) GUA MUSANG
- SJK (C) KAMPUNG PULAI

=== SMJK School ===
- SMJK (C) Chung Cheng, Kota Bharu
- SMJK (C) Chung Hwa, Kota Bharu

=== SMP School ===
- SMP Chung Hwa, Kok Lanas

== Technical school|Technical secondary schools: Sekolah Menengah Teknik (SMT) ==
- SMT Bachok, Bachok
- SMT Kuala Krai, Kuala Krai
- SMT Pasir Mas
- SMT Pengkalan Chepa, Kota Bharu
- SMT Tanah Merah, Tanah Merah

== MRSM and SBP ==
- Maktab Rendah Sains MARA Pengkalan Chepa
- Maktab Rendah Sains MARA Jeli
- Maktab Rendah Sains MARA Kuala Krai
- Maktab Rendah Sains MARA Pasir Tumboh
- Maktab Rendah Sains MARA Tumpat
- SMS Tengku Muhammad Faris Petra
- Sekolah Menengah Sains Machang
- Sekolah Menengah Sains Pasir Puteh
- Sekolah Menengah Sains Jeli
- Sekolah Menengah Sains Gua Musang

== See also ==
- Education in Malaysia
