= Kuzi ayam =

Malaysian thick based curry

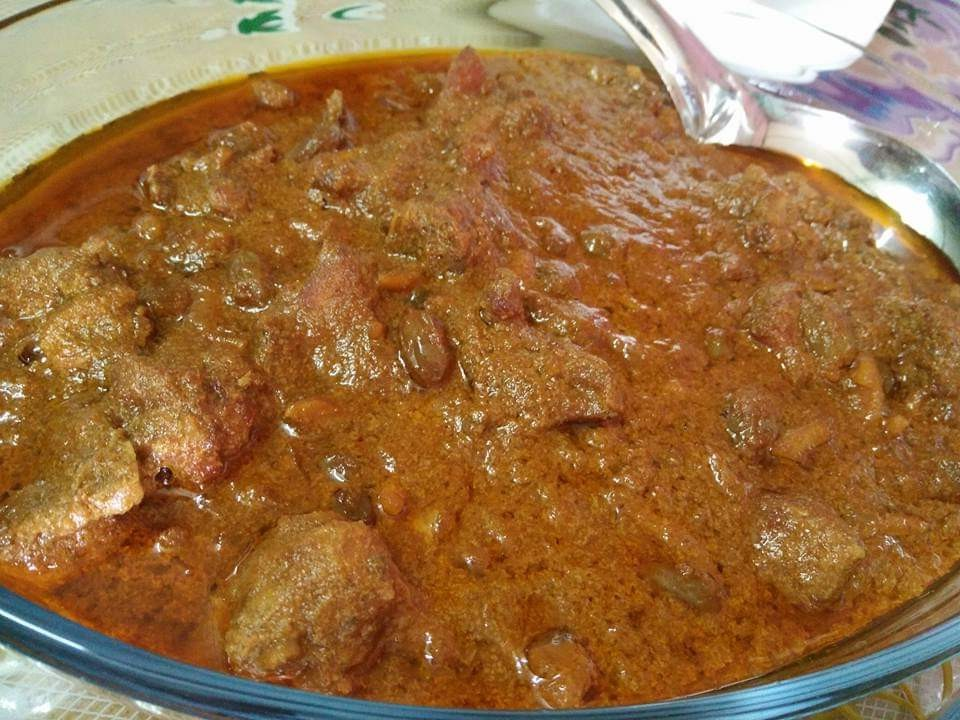
- Course: Main course
- Place of origin: Malaysia
- Region or state: Kelantan and Johor
- Created by: Kelantanese Malay
- Main ingredients: Chicken, saffron, evaporated milk, garlic, onion, ghee, salt, sugar, clove, cinnamon, dates, tomato puree, ketchup, kuzi spice

Kuzi ayam or ayam masak kuzi (Jawi: قوزي ايم; ايم ماسق قوزي) is a traditional food in commonly found in the Malaysian state of Kelantan, and to some extent, the state of Johor.

It is a thick based curry dish. The main ingredient used to prepare this dish is chicken (Malay: ayam). Traditionally, kuzi ayam is best served with ghee rice, bun, dinner roll and roti jala.

== See also ==
- Cuisine of Malaysia
- Quzi
