= Kelantan Museum =

Museum in Kota Bharu, Kelantan, Malaysia

- Muzium Kelantan
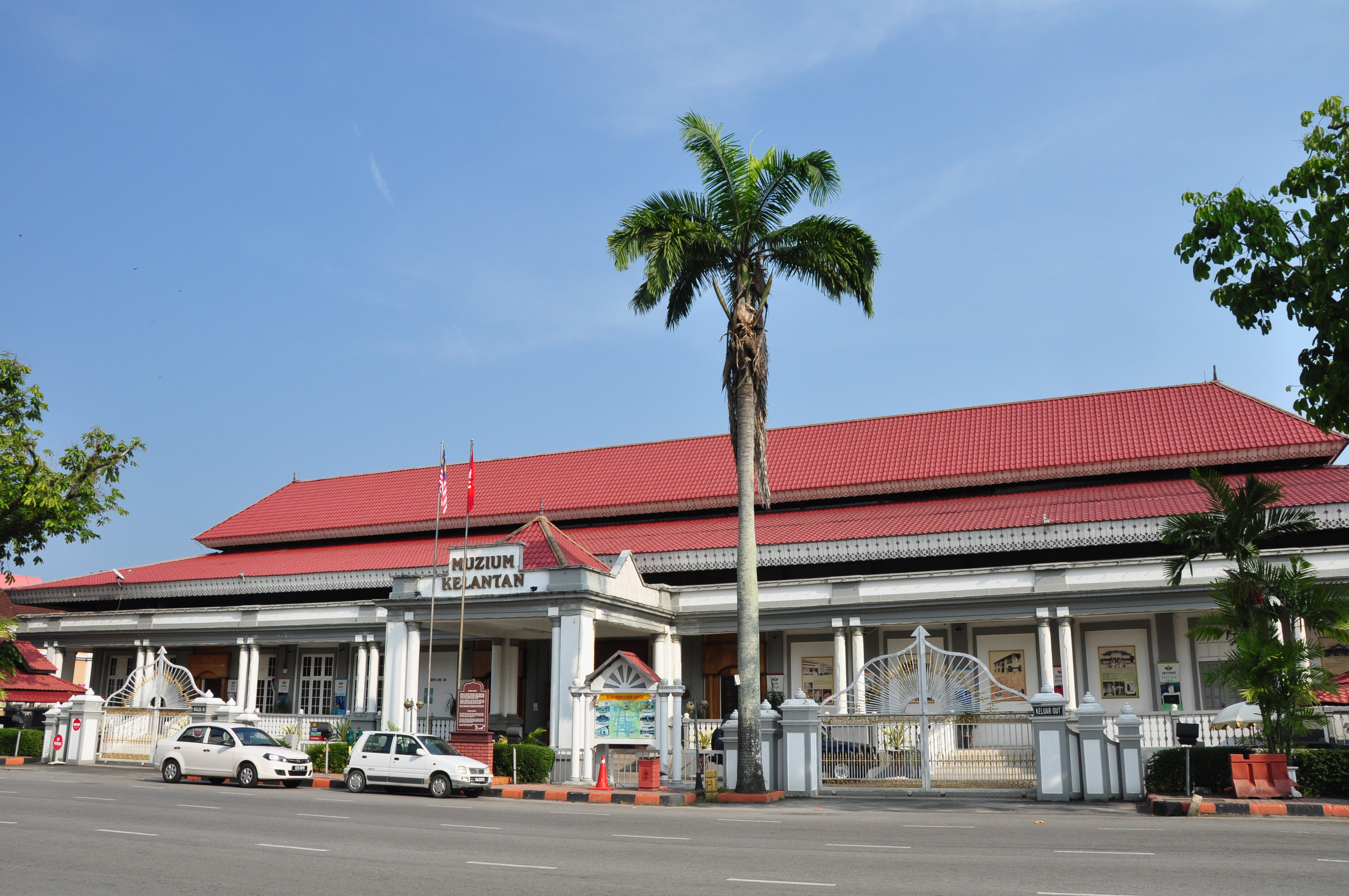
- Established: 1990
- Location: Kota Bharu, Kelantan, Malaysia
- Coordinates: 6°7′29.9″N 102°14′17.8″E
- Type: museum

The Kelantan Museum (Malay: Muzium Kelantan) is a museum in Kota Bharu, Kelantan, Malaysia.

== History ==
The museum was established in the former building of Kota Bharu Municipal Council. In 1988, the building interior was renovated by adding an extra half story and rooms for the museum exhibition. It was finally opened on 6 August 1990 by Kelantan Sultan Ismail Petra.

== Exhibitions ==
The museum showcases the history, culture and art of Kelantan.

== Events ==
The museum regularly holds various events, such as book launches etc.

== See also ==
- List of museums in Malaysia
- List of tourist attractions in Kelantan
