= Siti Khadijah Market =

Market in Kota Bharu, Kelantan, Malaysia

- Pasar Besar Siti Khadijah
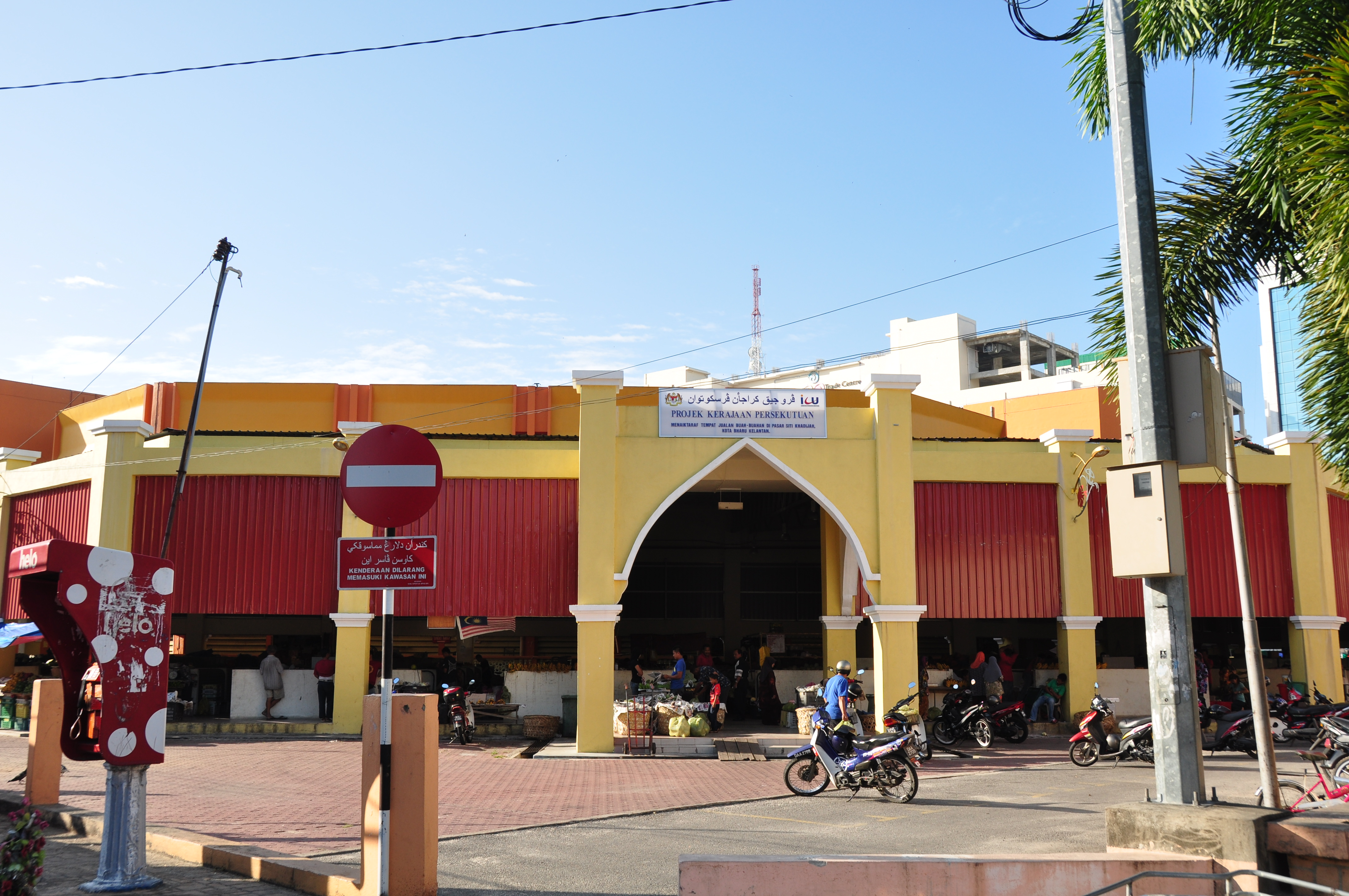
- Interactive map of the Siti Khadijah Market area

General information
- Type: market
- Location: Kota Bharu, Kelantan, Malaysia
- Coordinates: 6°7′48.4″N 102°14′20.6″E
- Opened: 1985

Technical details
- Floor count: 4

The Siti Khadijah Market (Malay: Pasar Besar Siti Khadijah) is a market in Kota Bharu, Kelantan, Malaysia.

== Name ==
The market's name is derived from Khadija bint Khuwaylid, the wife of Muhammad who was a businesswoman on that time. Thus, this market also is dominated by women sellers.

== History ==
The market was originally established as Buluh Kubu Market (Malay: Pasar Besar Buluh Kubu) in 1985 and opened to the public by Sultan Ismail Petra. The foundation stone of the building was laid by Tengku Razaleigh Hamzah. The market was then renamed by Kelantan Menteri Besar Nik Abdul Aziz Nik Mat in 1997.

== Architecture ==
The market is housed in a four-story building and features an octagonal shape.

== Commodities ==
Fresh goodies, ready-to-eat foods, local snacks and drinks can be found sold in the market.

The bottom floor is dedicated to wet items such as fish, vegetables, chicken and so on. Level 1 is allocated to dry food items such as serundeng. They additionally sell traditional Kelantan cakes, chicken, spiked fish, rice noodles, glazed rice, nasi dagang, laksam and somtam. The second and third floors are for non-food items.

== See also ==
- List of tourist attractions in Malaysia
