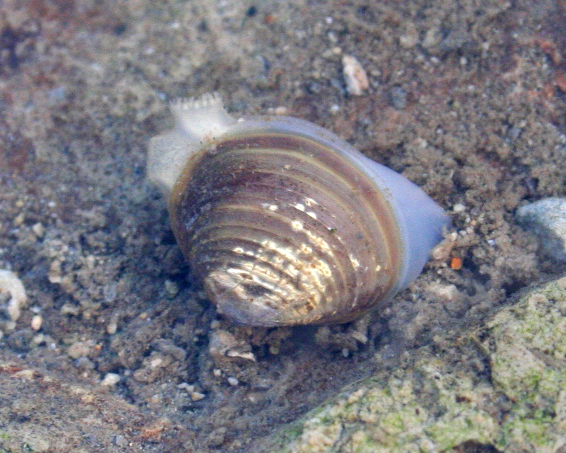
- A live Corbicula clam with the siphons and foot visible protruding from the shell

Scientific classification
- Domain: Eukaryota
- Kingdom: Animalia
- Phylum: Mollusca
- Class: Bivalvia
- Order: Venerida
- Suborder: Corbiculacea

Families
- Corbiculidae; Sphaeriidae

= Corbiculacea =

Suborder of bivalves

The Corbiculacea are a suborder of freshwater clams, aquatic bivalve molluscs in the order Venerida.
