= Lompat tikam =

Malaysian traditional dessert

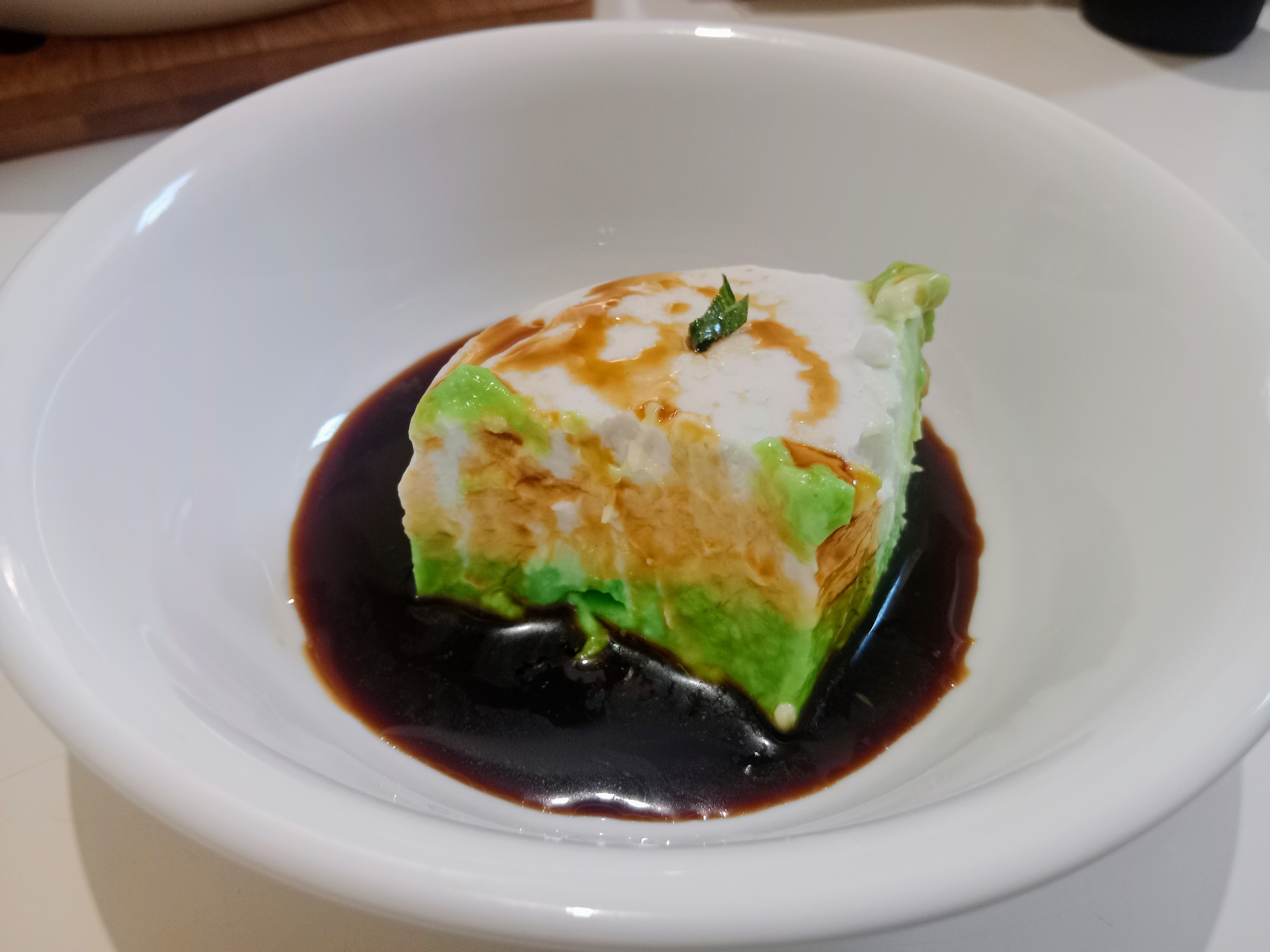
- Type: Dessert
- Place of origin: Malaysia
- Region or state: Kelantan and Terengganu
- Serving temperature: Warm
- Main ingredients: rice flour, coconut milk, and pandan.

Lompat tikam (Jawi: لومڤت تيکم; lit. 'jumping stab') is a traditional dessert from Malaysia, specifically the east coast of the Malay Peninsula in states such as Kelantan and Terengganu, made primarily out of rice flour, coconut milk, and pandan. The delicacy is typically made to taste plain, focusing only on the texture and fragrance, as it would be eaten with liquid palm sugar to add the sweetness and complete the dense flavour.

The dish has three main components: the green pandan pudding, the white coconut milk pudding, and the red sweet sticky rice. It will be served together in one plate, covered in liquid palm sugar or any other liquid palm-based sweetener.

Lompat tikam is especially popular during festive seasons such as Ramadan and Hari Raya, and is often served during ceremonies, feasts, and festivals.

== Name ==
Lompat tikam literally means "jump stab" or to stab while jumping or leaping. It is unclear on how the name came to be as it does not have any direct relation to the physical properties of the dish.

According to the Malaysian National Department of Culture and Arts, some sources claim that the name was inspired by its own unique taste, which excites the eater to the point that they would feel like jumping out of joy. It is also suggested that the name contains a humorous element, symbolizing the cheerful and close bond shared during communal meals. Some also say that there is a myth about a palace maid who tripped and fell while presenting the dessert to the Sultan of Kelantan. This caused the Sultan to jump in surprise and stab the maid by accident.
