= Md Anizam Ab Rahman =

Malaysian politician

Yang Berhormat Major (Rtd) Dato' Md Anizam Ab Rahman DJMK JMK MLA
- محمد انظام عبدالرحمٰن

Member of the Kelantan State Executive Council
- Incumbent
- Assumed office 15 August 2023
- Monarch: Muhammad V
- Deputy: Mohd Nasriff Daud
- Menteri Besar: Mohd Nassuruddin Daud
- Portfolio: Investment, Industry, Human Resources, Trade and Entrepreneurship
- Preceded by: Hanifa Ahmad (Industry, Trade, Investment & Entrepreneurial Development); Mohamed Fadzli Hassan (Human Development)
- Constituency: Kemahang
- In office 17 May 2018 – 15 August 2023
- Monarch: Muhammad V
- Deputy: Hassan Mahmood
- Menteri Besar: Ahmad Yakob
- Portfolio: Community Unity, Culture, Heritage and Tourism
- Preceded by: Himself (Culture, Tourism & Heritage); Anuar Tan Abdullah (Community Unity)
- Succeeded by: Zamakhshari Mohamad (Community Unity); Kamarudin Md Nor (Culture, Heritage and Tourism)
- Constituency: Kemahang
- In office 8 May 2013 – 9 May 2018
- Monarch: Muhammad V
- Menteri Besar: Ahmad Yaakob
- Portfolio: Culture, Tourism and Heritage
- Preceded by: Takiyuddin Hassan (Tourism & Culture); Portfolio established (Heritage)
- Succeeded by: Himself (Culture, Heritage and Tourism)
- Constituency: Kemahang
- In office 19 March 2008 – 8 May 2013
- Monarchs: Ismail Petra (2008–2010); Muhammad V (2010–2013)
- Menteri Besar: Nik Abdul Aziz Nik Mat
- Portfolio: Housing, Public Works, Utilities and Environment
- Preceded by: Takiyuddin Hassan (Housing); Himself (Public Works)
- Succeeded by: Abdul Fattah Mahmood (Housing, Environment); Portfolio abolished (Public Works); Hanifa Ahmad (Utilities)
- Constituency: Kemahang
- In office 23 March 2004 – 18 March 2008
- Monarch: Ismail Petra
- Menteri Besar: Nik Abdul Aziz Nik Mat
- Portfolio: Public Works, Infrastructure and Health
- Succeeded by: Himself (Public Works); Portfolio abolished (Infrastructure); Wan Ubaidah Omar (Health)
- Constituency: Kemahang

Faction represented in Kelantan State Legislative Assembly
- 1999–2020: Malaysian Islamic Party
- 2020–: Perikatan Nasional

Personal details
- Born: Md Anizam bin Ab Rahman; 5 May 1954 (age 71) Kelantan, Federation of Malaya (now Malaysia)
- Citizenship: Malaysian
- Party: Malaysian Islamic Party (PAS)
- Other political affiliations: Perikatan Nasional (PN); Muafakat Nasional (MN); Gagasan Sejahtera (GS); Pakatan Rakyat (PR); Barisan Alternatif (BA)
- Occupation: Politician

Md Anizam bin Ab Rahman is a Malaysian politician who has served as Member of the Kelantan State Legislative Assembly (MLA) for Kemahang since November 1999 and currently serves as a Kelantan State Executive Councillor.

== Election results ==
Kelantan State Legislative Assembly
Year	Constituency	Candidate	Votes	Pct	Opponent(s)	Votes	Pct	Ballots cast	Majority	Turnout
1999	N35 Kemahang	Md Anizam Ab Rahman (PAS)	6,251	52.64%	Mohd Adhan Kechik (UMNO)	5,623	47.36%	12,390	628	84.02%
2004	N28 Kemahang	Md Anizam Ab Rahman (PAS)	3,901	52.36%	Shuhanie Deraman (UMNO)	3,549	47.63%	7,592	352	83.58%
2008	N28 Kemahang	Md Anizam Ab Rahman (PAS)	5,481	60.70%	Zianon Abdin Ali (UMNO)	3,549	39.30%	9,149	1,932	83.55%
2013	N28 Kemahang	Md Anizam Ab Rahman (PAS)	6,953	55.76%	Dayang Saniah Awang Hamid (UMNO)	5,517	44.24%	12,608	1,436	87.70%
2018	N28 Kemahang	Md Anizam Ab Rahman (PAS)	7,261	50.65%	Wan Rakemi Wan Zahari (UMNO)	6,338	44.21%	14,682	923	81.60%
2018	N28 Kemahang	Md Anizam Ab Rahman (PAS)	7,261	50.65%	Bahari Mohamad Nor (BERSATU)	737	5.14%	14,682	923	81.60%
2023	N28 Kemahang	Md Anizam Ab Rahman (PAS)	10,375	77.20%	Mazli Mustafa (UMNO)	3,064	22.80%	13,523	7,311	58.14%

== Honours ==
- Kelantan
  - Knight Commander of the Order of the Life of the Crown of Kelantan (DJMK) – Dato' (2010)
  - Companion of the Order of the Life of the Crown of Kelantan (JMK) (2006)
