= Wan Roslan Wan Hamat =

Malaysian politician

Yang Berhormat Dato' Wan Roslan Wan Hamat DJMK JMK MLA
- وان رسلان وان حامد

Member of the Kelantan State Executive Council
- Incumbent
- Assumed office 15 August 2023
- Monarch: Muhammad V
- Deputy: Kamaruzaman Mohamad
- Menteri Besar: Mohd Nassuruddin Daud
- Portfolio: Education, Higher Education, Green Technology, Digital and Innovation
- Preceded by: Mohamed Fadzli Hassan (Education, Higher Education); Tuan Saripuddin Tuan Ismail (Green Technology); Portfolio established (Digital and Innovation)
- Constituency: Pengkalan Kubor
- In office 17 May 2018 – 15 August 2023
- Monarch: Muhammad V
- Deputy: Zuraidin Abdullah
- Menteri Besar: Ahmad Yakob
- Portfolio: Youth and Sports, Non-governmental Organisations
- Preceded by: Ramli Mamat
- Succeeded by: Zamakhshari Mohamad
- Constituency: Pengkalan Kubor

Member of the Kelantan State Legislative Assembly for Pengkalan Kubor
- Incumbent
- Assumed office 9 May 2018
- Preceded by: Mat Razi Mat Ail (BN-UMNO)
- Majority: 1,579 (2018); 6,040 (2023)

Faction represented in Kelantan State Legislative Assembly
- 2018–2020: Malaysian Islamic Party
- 2020–: Perikatan Nasional

Personal details
- Born: 20 June 1966 (age 60) Bukit Yong, Pasir Puteh, Kelantan, Malaysia
- Citizenship: Malaysian
- Party: Malaysian Islamic Party (PAS)
- Other political affiliations: Gagasan Sejahtera (GS) (–2018); Muafakat Nasional (MN); Perikatan Nasional (PN) (2020–present)
- Spouse(s): Wan Norihan Wan Abdul Rahman (m. ?; died 2022) Nurfariza Mhd Hassan (m. 2023)
- Education: University of Malaya (BA)
- Occupation: Politician

Wan Roslan bin Wan Hamat (born 20 June 1966) is a Malaysian politician who has served as Member of the Kelantan State Executive Council (EXCO) under former Menteri Besar, Ahmad Yakob and the current Menteri Besar, Mohd. Nassuruddin Daud. He has served as the Member of the Kelantan State Legislative Assembly (MLA) for Pengkalan Kubor since May 2018. He is a member of the Malaysian Islamic Party (PAS), a component party of the ruling Perikatan Nasional (PN) coalition.

== Personal life ==
At 6.55 pm on 16 July 2022, Wan Roslan's wife, Wan Norihan Wan Abdul Rahman died at the Universiti Sains Malaysia Hospital (HUSM) in Kubang Kerian at the age of 54. Anas Karimi Ahmad, the special officer to Wan Roslan confirmed and explained this on the same day. According to Anas Karimi, Wan Norihan had a heart condition and only underwent a coronary bypass at a private hospital not long before. Shortly after Hari Raya Aidilfitri in May, Wan Norihan suffered from fluids in her lungs and was in the intensive care unit (ICU) of a private hospital for 26 days before being transferred to HUSM. He also informed that Wan Norihan was to be buried in Kampung Kutan at night on the same day.

== Election results ==
Kelantan State Legislative Assembly
Year	Constituency	Candidate	Votes	Pct	Opponent(s)	Votes	Pct	Ballots cast	Majority	Turnout
2018	N01 Pengkalan Kubor	Wan Roslan Wan Hamat (PAS)	10,142	49.99%	Mat Razi Mat Ali (UMNO)	8,563	42.21%	20,649	1,579	75.9%
2018	N01 Pengkalan Kubor	Wan Roslan Wan Hamat (PAS)	10,142	49.99%	Wan Rosdi Mat Rasik (PKR)	1,583	7.8%	20,649	1,579	75.9%
2023	N01 Pengkalan Kubor	Wan Roslan Wan Hamat (PAS)	14,043	63.70%	Zulkifli Abdullah (UMNO)	8,003	36.30%	22,241	6,040	61.01%

== Honours ==
- Kelantan
  - Knight Commander of the Order of the Life of the Crown of Kelantan (DJMK) – Dato' (2024)
  - Companion of the Order of the Life of the Crown of Kelantan (JMK) (2022)
