= Mohd Adhan Kechik =

Malaysian politician

Yang Berbahagia Dato' Mohd Adhan Kechik DJMK SMK
- محمّد أذان كچيق

Member of the Kelantan State Legislative Assembly for Bukit Bunga
- In office 21 March 2004 – 12 August 2023
- Preceded by: new constituency
- Succeeded by: Mohd Almidi Jaafar (PN–BERSATU)
- Majority: 2,866 (2004); 348 (2008); 1,533 (2013); 1,081 (2018)

Personal details
- Party: United Malays National Organisation (UMNO)
- Other political affiliations: Barisan Nasional (BN)
- Relations: Zahari Kechik (younger brother)

Mohd Adhan bin Kechik is a Malaysian politician who had served as the Member of the Kelantan State Legislative Assembly (MLA) for Bukit Bunga from March 2004 to August 2023. He is a member of United Malays National Organisation (UMNO), a component of party Barisan Nasional (BN).

== Election results ==
Kelantan State Legislative Assembly
Year	Constituency	Candidate	Votes	Pct	Opponent(s)	Votes	Pct	Ballots cast	Majority	Turnout
1995	N35 Kemahang	Mohd Adhan Kechik (UMNO)	5,421	51.87%	Nik Kamaruzaman Sulong (S46)	5,031	48.13%	10,680	390	82.39%
1999	N35 Kemahang	Mohd Adhan Kechik (UMNO)	5,623	47.36%	Md Anizam Ab Rahman (PAS)	6,251	52.64%	12,390	628	84.02%
2004	N36 Bukit Bunga	Mohd Adhan Kechik (UMNO)	6,397	64.43%	Sufely Abd Razak (PAS)	3,531	35.57%	10,086	2,866	79.63%
2008	N36 Bukit Bunga	Mohd Adhan Kechik (UMNO)	5,731	51.57%	Sufely Abd Razak (PAS)	5,383	48.43%	11,406	348	81.85%
2013	N36 Bukit Bunga	Mohd Adhan Kechik (UMNO)	7,692	55.53%	Sufely Abd Razak (PAS)	6,159	44.47%	14,053	1,533	84.60%
2018	N36 Bukit Bunga	Mohd Adhan Kechik (UMNO)	7,068	51.54%	Ramzi Mohd Yusoff (PAS)	5,987	43.66%	14,044	1,081	80.94%
2018	N36 Bukit Bunga	Mohd Adhan Kechik (UMNO)	7,068	51.54%	Asran Alias (BERSATU)	659	4.81%	14,044	1,081	80.94%
2023	N36 Bukit Bunga	Mohd Adhan Kechik (UMNO)	4,388	33.94%	Mohd Almidi Jaafar (BERSATU)	8,540	66.06%	13,078	4,152	60.21%

== Honours ==
- Kelantan
  - Knight Commander of the Order of the Life of the Crown of Kelantan (DJMK) – Dato' (2013)
  - Recipient of the Crown of Kelantan Decoration (SMK) (1997)
