= Mohamed Fadzli Hassan =

Malaysian politician and lecturer

Yang Berhormat Dato' Mohamed Fadzli Hassan DJMK JMK MLA
- محمد فضلي بن حسن
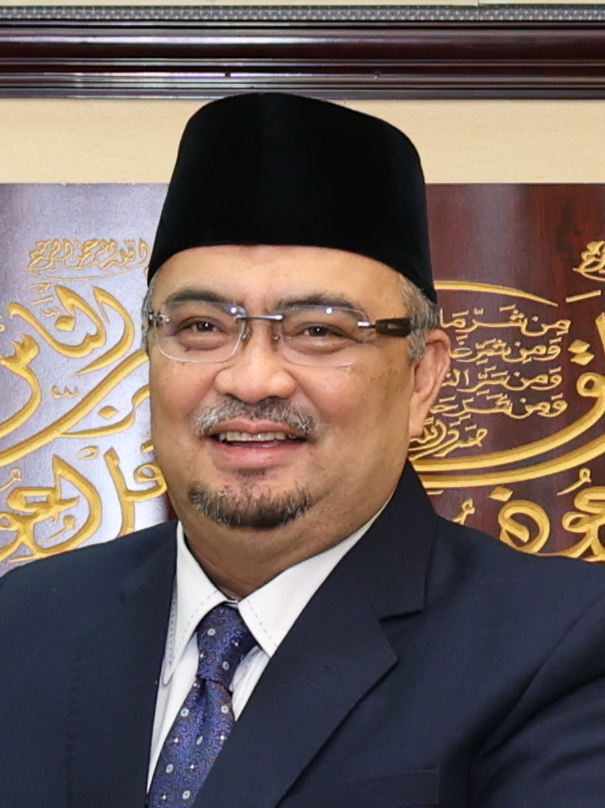

Deputy Menteri Besar of Kelantan
- Incumbent
- Assumed office 15 August 2023
- Monarch: Muhammad V
- Menteri Besar: Mohd Nassuruddin Daud
- Preceded by: Mohd Amar Abdullah
- Constituency: Temangan

Member of the Kelantan State Executive Council
- Incumbent
- Assumed office 15 August 2023
- Monarch: Muhammad V
- Menteri Besar: Mohd Nassuruddin Daud
- Portfolio: Regional Development, Natural Resources, Integrity, Human Development and Law
- Preceded by: Mohd Amar Abdullah (Regional Development, Integrity); Ahmad Yaakob (Natural Resources); Himself (Human Development); Portfolio established (Law)
- Constituency: Temangan
- In office 2018–2023
- Monarch: Muhammad V
- Menteri Besar: Ahmad Yakob
- Portfolio: Human Development, Education, Higher Education, Science and Technology
- Preceded by: Himself (Human Development, Education and Higher Education); Portfolio established (Science and Technology)
- Succeeded by: Himself (Human Development); Wan Roslan Wan Hamat (Education, Higher Education); Portfolio obolished (Science and Technology)
- Constituency: Temangan
- In office 2013–2018
- Monarch: Muhammad V
- Menteri Besar: Ahmad Yakob
- Portfolio: Human Development, Education and Higher Education
- Preceded by: Abdul Fattah Mahmood (Human Development); Mohd Amar Abdullah (Education); Portfolio established (Higher Education)
- Succeeded by: Himself (Human Development, Education and Higher Education)
- Constituency: Temangan
- In office 2008–2013
- Monarch: Muhammad V
- Menteri Besar: Nik Abdul Aziz Nik Mat
- Portfolio: Information, Information Development, Science and Technology
- Preceded by: Mohd Amar Abdullah (Information)
- Succeeded by: Portfolio obolished (Information, Information Development, Science and Technology)
- Constituency: Temangan

Faction represented in Kelantan State Legislative Assembly
- 2008–2020: Malaysian Islamic Party
- 2020–: Perikatan Nasional

Personal details
- Born: Mohamed Fadzli bin Hassan; 12 July 1968 (age 58) Machang, Kelantan, Malaysia
- Citizenship: Malaysian
- Party: Malaysian Islamic Party (PAS)
- Other political affiliations: Perikatan Nasional (PN)
- Spouse: Bahrulnurarifah Baharuddin
- Children: 5
- Education: International Islamic University Malaysia; University of Warwick; University of Birmingham
- Occupation: Politician
- Profession: Lecturer

Mohamed Fadzli bin Hassan (born 12 July 1968) is a Malaysian politician and lecturer who has served as the Deputy Menteri Besar of Kelantan since August 2023 and Member of the Kelantan State Legislative Assembly (MLA) for Temangan since March 2008. He is a member of the Malaysian Islamic Party (PAS), a component party of the Perikatan Nasional (PN) and formerly the Gagasan Sejahtera (GS) and Pakatan Rakyat (PR) coalitions.

== Election results ==
Kelantan State Legislative Assembly
Year	Constituency	Candidate	Votes	Pct	Opponent(s)	Votes	Pct	Ballots cast	Majority	Turnout
2008	N34 Temangan	Mohamed Fadzli Hassan (PAS)	7,120	54.77%	Rahimah Mahamad (UMNO)	5,881	45.23%	13,147	1,239	84.96%
2013	N34 Temangan	Mohamed Fadzli Hassan (PAS)	8,258	53.52%	Azemi Mat Zin (UMNO)	7,173	46.48%	15,598	1,085	87.00%
2018	N34 Temangan	Mohamed Fadzli Hassan (PAS)	8,711	52.99%	Wan Mohd Adnan Wan Aziz (UMNO)	6,814	41.45%	16,831	1,897	82.70%
2018	N34 Temangan	Mohamed Fadzli Hassan (PAS)	8,711	52.99%	Mohd Redzuan Alias (PKR)	914	5.56%	16,831	1,897	82.70%
2023	N34 Temangan	Mohamed Fadzli Hassan (PAS)	11,446	73.25%	Abdul Kadir Othman (AMANAH)	3,967	25.39%	15,764	7,479	60.60%
2023	N34 Temangan	Mohamed Fadzli Hassan (PAS)	11,446	73.25%	Fauzi Seman (IND)	212	1.36%	15,764	7,479	60.60%

== Honours ==
- Kelantan
  - Knight Commander of the Order of the Life of the Crown of Kelantan (DJMK) – Dato' (2012)
  - Companion of the Order of the Life of the Crown of Kelantan (JMK) (2010)
