= Chetok =

Chetok (N14)
Kelantan constituency

State constituency
- Legislature: Kelantan State Legislative Assembly
MLA
Zuraidin Abdullah
PN
- Constituency created: 1984
- Constituency abolished: 1990
- Constituency re-created: 2003
- First contested: 1986
- Last contested: 2023

Demographics
- Electors (2023): 29,111

Chetok is a state constituency in Kelantan, Malaysia, that has been represented in the Kelantan State Legislative Assembly.

The state constituency was first contested in 1986 and is mandated to return a single Assemblyman to the Kelantan State Legislative Assembly under the first-past-the-post voting system.

== Demographics ==
As of 2020, Chetok has a population of 32,989 people.

Ethnic breakdown of Chetok's electorate as of 2023
1. Malay (95.1%)
2. Chinese (4.48%)
3. Other ethnicities (0.42%)
4. Indian (0.04%)

== History ==
=== Polling districts ===
According to the Gazette issued on 30 March 2018, the Chetok constituency has a total of 13 polling districts.

State Constituency	Polling Districts	Code	Location
Chetok (N14）	Tanjong Redang	023/14/01	SK Lemal
Chetok (N14）	Lemal	023/14/02	SMK Tengku Panglima Raja
Chetok (N14）	Kelar	023/14/03	SK Kelar
Chetok (N14）	Kangkong	023/14/04	SK Kangkong
Chetok (N14）	Binjal	023/14/05	SMK Kangkong
Chetok (N14）	Chetok	023/14/06	SK Chabang Tiga Chetok
Chetok (N14）	Gelam	023/14/07	SK Kubang Chetok
Chetok (N14）	Rasal	023/14/08	SMU (A) Tarbiah Diniah Tok Uban
Chetok (N14）	Galok	023/14/09	SK Chetok
Chetok (N14）	Bendang Pauh	023/14/10	SK Bendang Pauh
Chetok (N14）	Jabo	023/14/11	SMU (A) Mardziah Jabo Chetok
Chetok (N14）	Bechah Kelubi	023/14/12	SK Bechah Kelubi
Chetok (N14）	Kubang Gendang	023/14/13	SMK Chetok

=== Representation history ===
Members of the Legislative Assembly for Chetok
Assembly	No	Years	Member	Party
Constituency created from Lemal
7th	N25	1986–1989	Hassan Mohamed	BN (HAMIM)
7th	N25	1989–1990	Hassan Mohamed	BN (UMNO)
8th	N25	1990–1995	Abd Rahman Musa	PAS
9th	N13	1995–1999	Hanafi Daud	PAS
10th	N13	1999–2004	Hanafi Daud	PAS
11th	N14	2004–2008	Abdul Halim Abdul Rahman	PAS
12th	N14	2008–2013	Abdul Halim Abdul Rahman	PR (PAS)
13th	N14	2013–2018	Abdul Halim Abdul Rahman	PR (PAS)
14th	N14	2018–2020	Zuraidin Abdullah	PAS
14th	N14	2020–2023	Zuraidin Abdullah	PN (PAS)
15th	N14	2023–present	Zuraidin Abdullah	PN (PAS)

== Election results ==
Kelantan state election, 2023: Chetok
Party	Candidate	Votes	%	∆%
PAS	Zuraidin Abdullah	12,202	74.38	▲22.27
PH	Mohd Ezzat Zahrim Hanuzi	4,203	25.62	▲25.62
Total valid votes		16,405	100.00	
Total rejected ballots		147		
Unreturned ballots		29		
Turnout		16,581	56.96	▼20.38
Registered electors		29,111		
Majority		7,999	48.76	▲32.85
PAS hold		Swing		

Kelantan state election, 2018: Chetok
Party	Candidate	Votes	%	∆%
PAS	Zuraidin Abdullah	8,071	52.11	▼3.07
BN	Mohd. Afifi Mohd. Noor	6,044	36.20	▼8.62
PKR	Ali Abdu Rahman Hassan	1,928	11.55	▲11.55
Independent	Zakaria Hassan	25	0.15	▲0.15
Total valid votes		16,405	100.00	
Total rejected ballots		249		
Unreturned ballots		182		
Turnout		17,129	77.34	▼6.43
Registered electors		22,149		
Majority		2,657	15.91	▲5.55
PAS hold		Swing		

Kelantan state election, 2013: Chetok
Party	Candidate	Votes	%	∆%
PAS	Abdul Halim Abdul Rahman	10,578	55.18	▼3.41
BN	Aimi Jusoh	8,593	44.82	▲3.41
Total valid votes		19,171	100.00	
Total rejected ballots		304		
Unreturned ballots		91		
Turnout		19,566	83.77	▲1.90
Registered electors		23,357		
Majority		1,985	10.36	▼6.82
PAS hold		Swing		

Kelantan state election, 2008: Chetok
Party	Candidate	Votes	%	∆%
PAS	Abdul Halim Abdul Rahman	9,107	58.59	▲6.68
BN	Abdul Rahim Abdul Rahman	6,437	41.41	▼6.68
Total valid votes		15,544	100.00	
Total rejected ballots		226		
Unreturned ballots		44		
Turnout		15,814	81.87	▲4.10
Registered electors		19,317		
Majority		2,670	17.18	▲13.36
PAS hold		Swing		

Kelantan state election, 2004: Chetok
Party	Candidate	Votes	%	∆%
PAS	Abdul Halim Abdul Rahman	6,970	51.91	▼7.25
BN	Mustafa Taib	6,458	48.09	▲7.25
Total valid votes		13,428	100.00	
Total rejected ballots		258		
Unreturned ballots		0		
Turnout		13,686	77.76	▲1.51
Registered electors		17,600		
Majority		512	3.81	▼14.50
PAS hold		Swing		

Kelantan state election, 1999: Chetok
Party	Candidate	Votes	%	∆%
PAS	Hanafi Daud	5,885	59.16	▲7.32
BN	Che Kamarul Wzaman Che Haron	4,063	40.84	▼7.32
Total valid votes		9,948	100.00	
Total rejected ballots		270		
Unreturned ballots		3		
Turnout		10,221	76.25	▲3.71
Registered electors		13,404		
Majority		1,822	18.32	▲14.64
PAS hold		Swing		

Kelantan state election, 1995: Chetok
Party	Candidate	Votes	%	∆%
PAS	Hanafi Daud	4,834	51.84	▼9.46
BN	Che Kamarul Wzaman Che Haron	4,491	48.16	▲11.74
Total valid votes		9,325	100.00	
Total rejected ballots		247		
Unreturned ballots		21		
Turnout		9,593	72.54	▼5.37
Registered electors		13,224		
Majority		343	3.68	▼21.20
PAS hold		Swing		

Kelantan state election, 1990: Chetok
Party	Candidate	Votes	%	∆%
PAS	Ab. Rahman Musa	5,642	61.30	▲14.44
BN	Hassan bMohamed	3,352	36.42	▲36.42
Independent	Abdul Rahman Ismail	210	2.28	▲2.28
Total valid votes		9,204	100.00	
Total rejected ballots		320		
Unreturned ballots		5		
Turnout		9,529	77.91	▲1.15
Registered electors		12,230		
Majority		2,290	24.88	▲18.61
PAS gain from BN		Swing		-

Kelantan state election, 1986: Chetok
Party	Candidate	Votes	%
BN	Hassan Mohamed	4,329	53.14
PAS	Mustafa Taib	3,818	46.86
Total valid votes		8,147	100.00
Total rejected ballots		330	
Unreturned ballots		0	
Turnout		8,477	76.76
Registered electors		11,043	
Majority		511	6.27
This was a new constituency created.
