= Limbongan (state constituency) =

State constituency in Kelantan, Malaysia

Limbongan (N30)
Kelantan constituency

State constituency
- Legislature: Kelantan State Legislative Assembly
MLA
Nor Asilah Mohamed Zin
PN
- Constituency created: 1984
- First contested: 1986
- Last contested: 2023

Demographics
- Electors (2023): 35,393

Limbongan is a state constituency in Kelantan, Malaysia, that has been represented in the Kelantan State Legislative Assembly.

The state constituency was first contested in 1986 and is mandated to return a single Assemblyman to the Kelantan State Legislative Assembly under the first-past-the-post voting system.

== Demographics ==
As of 2020, Limbongan has a population of 43,164 people.

Ethnic breakdown of Limbongan's electorate as of 2023
1. Malay (97.2%)
2. Chinese (1.93%)
3. Other ethnicities (0.74%)
4. Indian (0.07%)

== History ==
=== Polling districts ===
According to the Gazette issued on 30 March 2018, the Limbongan constituency has a total of 13 polling districts.

| State Constituency | Polling Districts | Code | Location |
|---|---|---|---|
| Limbongan (N30) | Jelor | 028/30/01 | SK Jelor |
| Limbongan (N30) | Kampung Nara | 028/30/02 | SK Kampong Nara |
| Limbongan (N30) | Kampung Merkang | 028/30/03 | SK Padang Pat Amat |
| Limbongan (N30) | Padang Pak Amat | 028/30/04 | SM Sains Pasir Puteh |
| Limbongan (N30) | Panggong | 028/30/05 | SK Panggong |
| Limbongan (N30) | Permatang Sungkai | 028/30/06 | SMU (A) Diniah Permatang Ramabi |
| Limbongan (N30) | Cherang Tuli | 028/30/07 | SMK Seri Aman |
| Limbongan (N30) | Saring | 028/30/08 | SMU (A) Nurul Ittifak Nering |
| Limbongan (N30) | Alor Pasir | 028/30/09 | SMK Tok Janggut |
| Limbongan (N30) | Gong Serapat | 028/30/10 | SK Pasir Puteh |
| Limbongan (N30) | Bandar Pasir Puteh | 028/30/11 | SK Pasir Puteh (L) |
| Limbongan (N30) | Dalam Kemuning | 028/30/12 | SK Seri Aman |
| Limbongan (N30) | Kampung Raja | 028/30/13 | SK Kampong Raja |

=== Representation History ===
Members of the Legislative Assembly for Limbongan
| Assembly | No | Years | Member | Party |
Constituency created from Bandar Pasir Puteh
| 7th | N23 | 1986–1990 | Raja Mahmud Raja Mamat | BN (UMNO) |
| 8th | N23 | 1990–1991 | Wan Mohd Najib Wan Mohamad | S46 |
| 8th | N23 | 1991 | Wan Mohd Najib Wan Mohamad | BN (UMNO) |
| 8th | N23 | 1991–1995 | Samat Mamat | S46 |
| 9th | N29 | 1995–1996 | Samat Mamat | S46 |
| 9th | N29 | 1996–1999 | Samat Mamat | BN (UMNO) |
| 10th | N29 | 1999–2004 | Zainuddin Awang Hamat | PAS |
| 11th | N30 | 2004–2008 | Zainuddin Awang Hamat | PAS |
| 12th | N30 | 2008–2013 | Zainuddin Awang Hamat | PR (PAS) |
| 13th | N30 | 2013–2018 | Mohd Nazlan Mohamed Hasbullah | PR (PAS) |
| 14th | N30 | 2018–2020 | Mohd Nazlan Mohamed Hasbullah | PAS |
| 14th | N30 | 2020–2023 | Mohd Nazlan Mohamed Hasbullah | PN (PAS) |
| 15th | N30 | 2023–present | Nor Asilah Mohamed Zin | PN (PAS) |

== Election results ==
Kelantan state election, 2023
| Party | Candidate | Votes | % | ∆% |
|---|---|---|---|---|
| PAS | Nor Asilah Mohamed Zin | 15,183 | 73.04 | ▲19.98 |
| PH | Kamaruddin Mat Zin | 5,603 | 26.96 | ▲26.96 |
| Total valid votes | | 20,786 | 100.00 | |
| Total rejected ballots | | 157 | | |
| Unreturned ballots | | 30 | | |
| Turnout | | 20,973 | 59.26 | ▼20.14 |
| Registered electors | | 35,393 | | |
| Majority | | 9,580 | 46.08 | ▲30.32 |
| PAS hold | | Swing | | |

Kelantan state election, 2018
| Party | Candidate | Votes | % | ∆% |
|---|---|---|---|---|
| PAS | Mohd Nazlan Mohamed Hasbullah | 10,563 | 53.06 | ▲0.44 |
| BN | Mohd Hanafiah Abdul Aziz | 7,425 | 37.29 | ▼10.09 |
| PKR | Zarir Yaakob | 1,921 | 9.65 | ▲9.65 |
| Total valid votes | | 19,909 | 100.00 | |
| Total rejected ballots | | 218 | | |
| Unreturned ballots | | 223 | | |
| Turnout | | 20,350 | 79.40 | ▼5.60 |
| Registered electors | | 25,629 | | |
| Majority | | 3,138 | 15.76 | ▲10.52 |
| PAS hold | | Swing | | |

Kelantan state election, 2013
| Party | Candidate | Votes | % | ∆% |
|---|---|---|---|---|
| PAS | Mohd Nazlan Mohamed Hasbullah | 10,480 | 52.62 | ▼2.61 |
| BN | Mohd Rujhan Selleh | 9,438 | 47.38 | ▲2.61 |
| Total valid votes | | 19,918 | 100.00 | |
| Total rejected ballots | | 260 | | |
| Unreturned ballots | | 65 | | |
| Turnout | | 20,243 | 85.00 | ▲3.52 |
| Registered electors | | 23,827 | | |
| Majority | | 1,042 | 5.24 | ▼5.22 |
| PAS hold | | Swing | | |

Kelantan state election, 2008
| Party | Candidate | Votes | % | ∆% |
|---|---|---|---|---|
| PAS | Zainuddin Awang Hamat | 8,622 | 55.23 | ▲2.84 |
| BN | Che Min Che Ahmad | 6,989 | 44.77 | ▼2.84 |
| Total valid votes | | 15,611 | 100.00 | |
| Total rejected ballots | | 224 | | |
| Unreturned ballots | | 69 | | |
| Turnout | | 15,904 | 81.48 | ▲1.81 |
| Registered electors | | 19,519 | | |
| Majority | | 1,633 | 10.46 | ▲5.68 |
| PAS hold | | Swing | | |

Kelantan state election, 2004
| Party | Candidate | Votes | % | ∆% |
|---|---|---|---|---|
| PAS | Zainuddin Awang Hamat | 7,090 | 52.39 | ▼12.85 |
| BN | Zainal Abedin Mohamed | 6,444 | 47.61 | ▲12.85 |
| Total valid votes | | 13,534 | 100.00 | |
| Total rejected ballots | | 210 | | |
| Unreturned ballots | | 0 | | |
| Turnout | | 13,744 | 79.67 | ▲4.72 |
| Registered electors | | 17,251 | | |
| Majority | | 646 | 4.78 | ▼25.70 |
| PAS hold | | Swing | | |

Kelantan state election, 1999
| Party | Candidate | Votes | % | ∆% |
|---|---|---|---|---|
| PAS | Zainuddin Awang Hamat | 7,829 | 65.24 | ▲65.24 |
| BN | Samat Mamat | 4,171 | 34.76 | ▼6.24 |
| Total valid votes | | 12,000 | 100.00 | |
| Total rejected ballots | | 175 | | |
| Unreturned ballots | | 41 | | |
| Turnout | | 12,216 | 74.95 | ▼0.01 |
| Registered electors | | 16,298 | | |
| Majority | | 3,658 | 30.48 | ▲13.40 |
| PAS gain from S46 | | Swing | | ? |

Kelantan state election, 1995
| Party | Candidate | Votes | % | ∆% |
|---|---|---|---|---|
| S46 | Samat Mamat | 6,710 | 58.08 | ▼8.87 |
| BN | Wan Mohd Najib Wan Mohamad | 4,737 | 41.00 | ▲9.28 |
| KITA | Amanullah Abdul Kudus | 106 | 0.92 | ▲0.92 |
| Total valid votes | | 11,553 | 100.00 | |
| Total rejected ballots | | 228 | | |
| Unreturned ballots | | 71 | | |
| Turnout | | 11,852 | 74.96 | ▼2.77 |
| Registered electors | | 15,812 | | |
| Majority | | 1,973 | 17.08 | ▼18.15 |
| S46 hold | | Swing | | |

Kelantan state election, 1990
| Party | Candidate | Votes | % | ∆% |
|---|---|---|---|---|
| S46 | Wan Mohd Najib Wan Mohamad | 7,091 | 66.95 | ▲66.95 |
| BN | Cik Agil | 3,359 | 31.72 | ▼25.07 |
| Independent | Afandi Hassan | 141 | 1.33 | ▲1.33 |
| Total valid votes | | 10,591 | 100.00 | |
| Total rejected ballots | | 249 | | |
| Unreturned ballots | | 0 | | |
| Turnout | | 10,840 | 77.73 | ▲4.31 |
| Registered electors | | 13,946 | | |
| Majority | | 3,732 | 35.23 | ▲21.65 |
| S46 gain from BN | | Swing | | ? |

Kelantan state election, 1986
| Party | Candidate | Votes | % |
|---|---|---|---|
| BN | Raja Mahmud Raja Mamat | 5,187 | 56.79 |
| PAS | Wan Yusoff Wan Asmat | 3,947 | 43.21 |
| Total valid votes | | 9,134 | 100.00 |
| Total rejected ballots | | 317 | |
| Unreturned ballots | | 0 | |
| Turnout | | 9,451 | 73.42 |
| Registered electors | | 12,873 | |
| Majority | | 1,240 | 13.58 |
This was a new constituency created.
