= Temangan =

State constituency in Kelantan, Malaysia

Temangan (N34)
Kelantan constituency

State constituency
- Legislature: Kelantan State Legislative Assembly
MLA
Mohamed Fadzli Hassan
PN
- Constituency created: 1974
- First contested: 1974
- Last contested: 2023

Demographics
- Electors (2023): 26,012

Temangan is a state constituency in Kelantan, Malaysia, that has been represented in the Kelantan State Legislative Assembly.

The state constituency was first contested in 1974 and is mandated to return a single Assemblyman to the Kelantan State Legislative Assembly under the first-past-the-post voting system.

== Demographics ==
As of 2020, Temangan has a population of 29,773 people.

Ethnic breakdown of Temangan's electorate as of 2023
1. Malay (95.0%)
2. Chinese (4.31%)
3. Other ethnicities (0.43%)
4. Indian (0.29%)

== History ==
=== Polling districts ===
According to the Gazette issued on 30 March 2018, the Temangan constituency has a total of 11 polling districts.

State Constituency	Polling Districts	Code	Location
Temangan (N34）	Simpul Berlubang	029/34/01	SK Pangkal Mak Wan
Temangan (N34）	Kelaweh	029/34/02	SK Kelaweh
Temangan (N34）	Pak Roman	029/34/03	SK Pak Roman
Temangan (N34）	Pangkal Meleret	029/34/04	SK Pangkal Meleret
Temangan (N34）	Paloh Rawa	029/34/05	SK Paloh Rawa
Temangan (N34）	Batu 30	029/34/06	SK Pangkal Jenereh
Temangan (N34）	Kampung Raua	029/34/07	SK Kampong Pek
Temangan (N34）	Kampung Pauh	029/34/08	SK Temangan
Temangan (N34）	Bandar Temangan	029/34/09	SJK (C) Chung Hwa
Temangan (N34）	Kampung Kerilla	029/34/10	SK Kampung Kerilla
Temangan (N34）	Pangkal Chuit	029/34/11	SMU (A) Al-Hasaniah Pangkal Jenerih

=== Representation history ===
Members of the Legislative Assembly for Temangan
Assembly	No	Years	Member	Party
Constituency created from Machang Selatan
4th	N31	1974–1978	Nik Hussin Wan Abdul Rahman	BN (PAS)
5th	N31	1978–1982	Salleh Che Harun	BN (UMNO)
6th	N31	1982–1986	Salleh Che Harun	BN (UMNO)
7th	N34	1986–1990	Salleh Che Harun	BN (UMNO)
8th	N34	1990–1995	Kelthum Ahmed	S46
Constituency abolished, split into Banggol Judah and Mengkebang
Constituency re-created from Banggol Judah
11th	N34	2004–2008	Hassan Muhamad	PAS
12th	N34	2008–2013	Mohamed Fadzli Hassan	PR (PAS)
13th	N34	2013–2018	Mohamed Fadzli Hassan	PR (PAS)
14th	N34	2018–2020	Mohamed Fadzli Hassan	PAS
14th	N34	2020–2023	Mohamed Fadzli Hassan	PN (PAS)
15th	N34	2023–present	Mohamed Fadzli Hassan	PN (PAS)

== Election results ==
Kelantan state election, 2023: Temangan
Party	Candidate	Votes	%	∆%
PAS	Mohamed Fadzli Hassan	11,446	73.25	▲20.26
PH	Abdul Kadir Othman	3,967	25.39	▲25.39
Independent	Fauzi Seman	212	1.36	▲1.36
Total valid votes		15,625	100.00	
Total rejected ballots		118		
Unreturned ballots		21		
Turnout		15,764	60.60	▼22.09
Registered electors		26,012		
Majority		7,479	47.86	▲36.32
PAS hold		Swing		

Kelantan state election, 2018: Temangan
Party	Candidate	Votes	%	∆%
PAS	Mohamed Fadzli Hassan	8,711	52.99	▼0.53
BN	Wan Mohd Adnan Wan Aziz	6,814	41.45	▼5.03
PKR	Mohd Redzuan Alias	914	5.56	▲5.56
Total valid votes		16,439	100.00	
Total rejected ballots		248		
Unreturned ballots		144		
Turnout		16,831	82.69	▼4.28
Registered electors		20,354		
Majority		1,897	11.54	▲4.50
PAS hold		Swing		

Kelantan state election, 2013: Temangan
Party	Candidate	Votes	%	∆%
PAS	Mohamed Fadzli Hassan	8,258	53.52	▼1.25
BN	Azemi Mat Zin	7,173	46.48	▲1.25
Total valid votes		15,431	100.00	
Total rejected ballots		167		
Unreturned ballots		27		
Turnout		15,625	86.97	▲2.01
Registered electors		17,966		
Majority		1,085	7.04	▼2.50
PAS hold		Swing		

Kelantan state election, 2008: Temangan
Party	Candidate	Votes	%	∆%
PAS	Mohamed Fadzli Hassan	7,120	54.77	▲4.43
BN	Rahimah Mahamad	5,881	45.23	▼4.43
Total valid votes		13,001	100.00	
Total rejected ballots		132		
Unreturned ballots		14		
Turnout		13,147	84.96	▲2.86
Registered electors		15,474		
Majority		1,239	9.53	▲8.86
PAS hold		Swing		

Kelantan state election, 2004: Temangan
Party	Candidate	Votes	%	∆%
PAS	Hassan Muhamad	5,600	50.34	
BN	Ismail Mamat	5,525	49.66	
Total valid votes		11,125	100.00	
Total rejected ballots		146		
Unreturned ballots		0		
Turnout		11,271	82.10	
Registered electors		13,728		
Majority		75	0.67	
PAS hold		Swing		

Kelantan state election, 1990: Temangan
Party	Candidate	Votes	%	∆%
PAS	Kelthum Ahmed	5,608	64.85	▲64.85
BN	Salleh Che Harun	3,039	35.15	▼28.50
Total valid votes		8,647	100.00	
Total rejected ballots		251		
Unreturned ballots		4		
Turnout		8,902	82.60	▲2.54
Registered electors		10,777		
Majority		2,569	29.71	▲2.42
PAS gain from BN		Swing		-

Kelantan state election, 1986: Temangan
Party	Candidate	Votes	%	∆%
BN	Salleh Che Harun	4,872	63.64	▲4.28
PAS	Ismail Sulaiman	2,783	36.36	▼4.28
Total valid votes		7,655	100.00	
Total rejected ballots		303		
Unreturned ballots		0		
Turnout		7,958	80.06	▼7.89
Registered electors		9,940		
Majority		2,089	27.29	▲8.57
BN hold		Swing		

Kelantan state election, 1982: Temangan
Party	Candidate	Votes	%	∆%
BN	Salleh Che Harun	3,732	59.36	▲4.65
PAS	Mohd Noor Yaakub	2,555	40.64	▲9.71
Total valid votes		6,287	100.00	
Total rejected ballots		95		
Unreturned ballots		0		
Turnout		6,382	87.95	▲6.35
Registered electors		7,256		
Majority		1,177	18.72	▼5.06
BN hold		Swing		

Kelantan state election, 1978: Temangan
Party	Candidate	Votes	%	∆%
BN	Salleh Che Harun	2,701	54.71	▲54.71
PAS	Abdul Ghani Abdul Rahman	1,527	30.93	▼48.95
Pan-Malaysian Islamic Front	Ahmad Tabarani Harun	664	13.45	▲13.45
Independent	Abd. Kadir Awang	45	0.91	▼19.21
Total valid votes		4,937	100.00	
Total rejected ballots		79		
Unreturned ballots		0		
Turnout		5,016	81.60	▼2.39
Registered electors		6,147		
Majority		1,174	23.78	▼35.97
BN hold		Swing		

Kelantan state election, 1974: Temangan
Party	Candidate	Votes	%
BN	Nik Hussain Nik Abdul Rahman	3,727	79.88
Independent	Abd. Hana Abd. Salam	939	20.12
Total valid votes		4,666	100.00
Total rejected ballots		307	
Unreturned ballots		0	
Turnout		4,973	83.99
Registered electors		5,921	
Majority		2,788	59.75
This was a new constituency created.
