= Pengkalan Kubor (state constituency) =

Malaysian state constituency

Pengkalan Kubor (N01)
Kelantan constituency

State constituency
- Legislature: Kelantan State Legislative Assembly
MLA
Wan Roslan Wan Hamat
PN
- Constituency created: 1994
- First contested: 1995
- Last contested: 2023

Demographics
- Electors (2023): 36,492

Pengkalan Kubor is a state constituency in Kelantan, Malaysia, that has been represented in the Kelantan State Legislative Assembly.

The state constituency was first contested in 1995 and is mandated to return a single Assemblyman to the Kelantan State Legislative Assembly under the first-past-the-post voting system.

== Demographics ==
As of 2020, Pengkalan Kubor has a population of 64,396 people.

Ethnic breakdown of Pengkalan Kubor's electorate as of 2023
1. Malay (92.6%)
2. Other ethnicities (6.46%)
3. Chinese (0.89%)
4. Indian (0.09%)

== History ==
=== Polling districts ===
According to the Gazette issued on 30 March 2018, the Pengkalan Kubor constituency has a total of 12 polling districts.

State Constituency	Polling Districts	Code	Location
Pengkalan Kubor (N01）	Pengkalan Kubor	019/01/01	SK Pengkalan Kubor (1)
Pengkalan Kubor (N01）	Kampung Ketil	019/01/02	SK Pengkalan Kubor (2)
Pengkalan Kubor (N01）	Kampung Tebing	019/01/03	SMU (A) Meheliah Getting
Pengkalan Kubor (N01）	Kampung Geting	019/01/04	SK Geting (1)
Pengkalan Kubor (N01）	Simpangan	019/01/05	SK Simpangan
Pengkalan Kubor (N01）	Tujoh	019/01/06	MRSM Tumpat
Pengkalan Kubor (N01）	Telaga Bata	019/01/07	SK Bunohan
Pengkalan Kubor (N01）	Bunohan	019/01/08	SK Bunohan
Pengkalan Kubor (N01）	Jubakar Darat	019/01/09	SK Sri Neting
Pengkalan Kubor (N01）	Kampung Bendang Pak Yong	019/01/10	SK Bendang Pa' Yong
Pengkalan Kubor (N01）	Kampung Telok Jering	019/01/11	SK Teluk Jering
Pengkalan Kubor (N01）	Kedai Geting	019/01/12	SMK Putting

=== Representation history ===
Members of the Legislative Assembly for Pengkalan Kubor
Assembly	No	Years	Member	Party
Constituency created from Geting
9th	N01	1995–1999	Mat Nawawi Mat Jusoh	BN (UMNO)
10th	N01	1999–2004	Wan Husain Wan Ahmad	PAS
11th	N01	2004–2008	Noor Zahidi Omar	BN (UMNO)
12th	N01	2008–2013	Noor Zahidi Omar	BN (UMNO)
13th	N01	2013–2014	Noor Zahidi Omar	BN (UMNO)
13th	N01	2014–2018	Mat Razi Mat Ail	BN (UMNO)
14th	N01	2018–2020	Wan Roslan Wan Hamat	PAS
14th	N01	2020–2023	Wan Roslan Wan Hamat	PN (PAS)
15th	N01	2023–present	Wan Roslan Wan Hamat	PN (PAS)

== Election results ==
Kelantan state election, 2023
Party	Candidate	Votes	%	∆%
PAS	Wan Roslan Wan Hamat	14,043	63.70	▲13.71
BN	Zulkifli Abdullah	8,003	36.30	▼5.91
Total valid votes		22,046	100.00	
Total rejected ballots		195		
Unreturned ballots		21		
Turnout		22,262	61.01	▼14.90
Registered electors		36,492		
Majority		6,040	27.40	▲19.62
PAS hold		Swing		

Kelantan state election, 2018
Party	Candidate	Votes	%	∆%
PAS	Wan Roslan Wan Hamat	10,142	49.99	▲7.70
BN	Mat Razi Mat Ail	8,563	42.21	▼15.28
PKR	Wan Rosdi Mat Rasik	1,583	7.80	▲7.80
Total valid votes		20,288	100.00	
Total rejected ballots		361		
Unreturned ballots		147		
Turnout		20,796	75.91	▲2.91
Registered electors		27,395		
Majority		1,579	7.78	▼7.42
PAS gain from BN		Swing		?

Kelantan state by-election, 25 September 2014 The by-election was called due to the death of incumbent, Noor Zahidi Omar.
Party	Candidate	Votes	%	∆%
BN	Mat Razi Mat Ail	9,961	57.49	▲3.12
PAS	Wan Rosdi Wan Ibrahim	7,326	42.29	▲42.29
Independent	Izat Bukhary Ismail Bukhary	38	0.22	▼0.13
Total valid votes		17,325	100.00	
Total rejected ballots		230		
Unreturned ballots		3		
Turnout		17,548	73.00	▼6.10
Registered electors		24,039		
Majority		2,635	15.20	▲5.91
BN hold		Swing		
Source(s) "Pilihan Raya Kecil N.01 Pengkalan Kubor". Election Commission of Malaysia. "Federal Government Gazette - Notice of Contested Election - By-election of the State Legislative Assembly of N.01 Pengkalan Kubor for the State of Kelantan [P.U. (B) 415/2014]" (PDF). Attorney General's Chambers of Malaysia. 15 September 2014. "Federal Government Gazette - Results of Contested Election and Statement of the Poll after the Official Addition of Votes for the By-election of N.01 Pengkalan Kubor [P.U. (B) 429/2014]" (PDF). Attorney General's Chambers of Malaysia. 30 September 2014.

Kelantan state election, 2013
Party	Candidate	Votes	%	∆%
BN	Noor Zahidi Omar	10,174	54.47	▲4.14
PKR	Saharun Ibrahim	8,438	45.18	▼4.49
Independent	Izat Bukhary Ismail Bukhary	65	0.35	▲0.35
Total valid votes		18,677	100.00	
Total rejected ballots		344		
Unreturned ballots		34		
Turnout		19,060	79.10	▲2.85
Registered electors		24,097		
Majority		1,736	9.29	▲8.63
BN hold		Swing		

Kelantan state election, 2008
Party	Candidate	Votes	%	∆%
BN	Noor Zahidi Omar	7,643	50.33	▼2.51
PKR	Hassan Berahim	7,543	49.67	▲49.67
Total valid votes		15,186	100.00	
Total rejected ballots		263		
Unreturned ballots		39		
Turnout		15,487	76.25	▲4.27
Registered electors		20,311		
Majority		100	0.66	▼5.02
BN hold		Swing		

Kelantan state election, 2004
Party	Candidate	Votes	%	∆%
BN	Noor Zahidi Omar	6,638	52.84	▲13.15
PAS	Wan Husain Wan Ahmad	5,924	47.16	▼13.15
Total valid votes		12,562	100.00	
Total rejected ballots		214		
Unreturned ballots		0		
Turnout		12,776	71.98	▼0.84
Registered electors		17,750		
Majority		714	5.68	▼14.94
BN gain from PAS		Swing		?

Kelantan state election, 1999
Party	Candidate	Votes	%	∆%
PAS	Wan Husain Wan Ahmad	7,115	60.31	▲16.28
BN	Mohd Fauzi Muhammad	4,683	39.69	▼16.28
Total valid votes		11,798	100.00	
Total rejected ballots		242		
Unreturned ballots		3		
Turnout		12,043	72.82	▲0.72
Registered electors		16,539		
Majority		2,432	20.62	▲8.68
PAS gain from BN		Swing		?

Kelantan state election, 1995
Party	Candidate	Votes	%
BN	Mat Nawawi Mat Jusoh	6,086	55.97
PAS	Wan Rahman Wan Salleh	4,788	44.03
Total valid votes		10,874	100.00
Total rejected ballots		259	
Unreturned ballots		33	
Turnout		11,165	72.10
Registered electors		15,486	
Majority		1,298	11.94
This was a new constituency created.
