= Azami Mohd Nor =

Malaysian politician

Yang Berhormat Dato' Sr. Azami Mohd Nor DJMK JMK MLA
- عزامي محمد نور

Exco roles (Kelantan)
- 2010–2013: Deputy Chairman of the Economic Planning, Finance and Welfare
- 2018–2023: Chairman of the Public Works, Infrastructure, Transport and Utilities

Faction represented in Kelantan State Legislative Assembly
- 2008–2020: Malaysian Islamic Party
- 2020–: Perikatan Nasional

Personal details
- Born: Azami Md Nor; 18 October 1957 (age 68) Kelantan, Federation of Malaya (now Malaysia)
- Citizenship: Malaysian
- Party: Malaysian Islamic Party (PAS)
- Other political affiliations: Perikatan Nasional (PN); Muafakat Nasional (MN); Pakatan Rakyat (PR)
- Occupation: Politician

Azami bin Mohd Nor is a Malaysian politician who has served as Member of the Kelantan State Legislative Assembly (MLA) for Kadok since March 2008. He is a member of the Malaysian Islamic Party (PAS), a component party of the Perikatan Nasional (PN) coalition.

== Election results ==
Kelantan State Legislative Assembly
Year	Constituency	Candidate	Votes	Pct	Opponent(s)	Votes	Pct	Ballots cast	Majority	Turnout
2008	N24 Kadok	Azami Mohd Nor (PAS)	6,972	57.43%	Roslan Ab Hamid (UMNO)	5,169	42.57%	12,308	1,803	85.26%
2013	N24 Kadok	Azami Mohd Nor (PAS)	8,753	60.75%	Mohamad Basri Awang (UMNO)	5,656	39.25%	14,654	3,097	86.00%
2018	N24 Kadok	Azami Mohd Nor (PAS)	7,025	52.30%	Mohammad Azam Ismail (UMNO)	5,161	38.42%	13,637	1,864	83.53%
2018	N24 Kadok	Azami Mohd Nor (PAS)	7,025	52.30%	Che Ibrahim Mohamed (AMANAH)	1,246	9.28%	13,637	1,864	83.53%
2023	N24 Kadok	Azami Mohd Nor (PAS)	10,442	75.95%	Mohd Azizan Razak (AMANAH)	3,307	24.05%	13,858	7,135	63.63%

== Honours ==
- Kelantan
  - Knight Commander of the Order of the Life of the Crown of Kelantan (DJMK) – Dato' (2018)
  - Companion of the Order of the Life of the Crown of Kelantan (JMK)
