= Jelawat (state constituency) =

Political subdivision in Malaysia

Jelawat (N22)
Kelantan constituency

State constituency
- Legislature: Kelantan State Legislative Assembly
MLA
Zameri Mat Nawang
PN
- Constituency created: 1974
- First contested: 1974
- Last contested: 2023

Demographics
- Electors (2023): 40,012

Jelawat is a state constituency in Kelantan, Malaysia, that has been represented in the Kelantan State Legislative Assembly.

The state constituency was first contested in 1974 and is mandated to return a single Assemblyman to the Kelantan State Legislative Assembly under the first-past-the-post voting system.

== Demographics ==
As of 2020, Jelawat has a population of 45,950 people.

Ethnic breakdown of Jelawat's electorate as of 2023
1. Malay (98.5%)
2. Chinese (0.96%)
3. Other ethnicities (0.46%)
4. Indian (0.06%)

== History ==
=== Polling districts ===
According to the Gazette issued on 30 March 2018, the Jelawat constituency has a total of 18 polling districts.

State Constituency	Polling Districts	Code	Location
Jelawat（N22）	Kampung Redang	025/22/01	SK Sri Kemuning
Jelawat（N22）	Beris Lalang	025/22/02	SK Beris Lalang
Jelawat（N22）	Jelawat Tengah	025/22/03	SK Jelawat
Jelawat（N22）	Kampung Bator	025/22/04	SMK Jelawat
Jelawat（N22）	Kuchelong	025/22/05	SK Kuchelong
Jelawat（N22）	Kedai Pauh Lima	025/22/06	SK Pauh Lima
Jelawat（N22）	Teratak Pulai	025/22/07	SK Gunong
Jelawat（N22）	Seneng	025/22/08	SK Seneng
Jelawat（N22）	Telaga Ara	025/22/09	SK Telaga Ara
Jelawat（N22）	Keting	025/22/10	SK Keting
Jelawat（N22）	Gunong	025/22/11	SMK Sri Gunung
Jelawat（N22）	Alor Bakat	025/22/12	SK Alor Bakat
Jelawat（N22）	Mahligai	025/22/13	SK Pak Badol
Jelawat（N22）	Pak Badol	025/22/14	SMK Pak Bodol
Jelawat（N22）	Serdang	025/22/15	SK Kolam
Jelawat（N22）	Kolam	025/22/16	SMU (A) Darul Ulum Muhammadiah
Jelawat（N22）	Kubang Telaga	025/22/17	SK Kubang Telaga
Jelawat（N22）	Kampung Bakong	025/22/18	SK Bakong

=== Representation history ===
Members of the Legislative Assembly for Jelawat
Assembly	No	Years	Member	Party
Constituency created from Bachok Selantan
4th	N15	1974–1978	Mohamed Yaacob	BN (UMNO)
5th	N15	1978–1982	Mohamad Hassan	BN (UMNO)
6th	N15	1982–1986	Mohamad Hassan	BN (UMNO)
7th	N21	1986–1990	Zainuddin Awang Hamat	BN (UMNO)
8th	N21	1990–1995	Mohd Daud Ja'afar	S46
9th	N21	1995–1999	Mohd Daud Ja'afar	S46
10th	N21	1999–2004	Shaary Awang	BA (PAS)
11th	N22	2004–2008	Ilias Husain	BN (UMNO)
12th	N22	2008–2013	Abdul Azziz Kadir	PR (PAS)
13th	N22	2013–2018	Abdul Azziz Kadir	PR (PAS)
14th	N22	2018-2020	Abdul Azziz Kadir	PAS
14th	N22	2020–2023	Abdul Azziz Kadir	PN (PAS)
15th	N22	2023–present	Zameri Mat Nawang	PN (PAS)

== Election results ==
Kelantan state election, 2023
Party	Candidate	Votes	%	∆%
PAS	Zameri Mat Nawang	16,885	69.09	▲16.85
BN	Yusri Che Noh	7,277	29.78	▼12.00
Independent	Zulkarnain Haron	277	1.13	▲1.13
Total valid votes		24,439	100.00	
Total rejected ballots		199		
Unreturned ballots		36		
Turnout		24,674	61.67	▼16.67
Registered electors		40,012		
Majority		9,608	39.31	▲28.85
PAS hold		Swing		

Kelantan state election, 2018
Party	Candidate	Votes	%	∆%
PAS	Abd Azziz Kadir	12,463	52.24	▲2.01
BN	Mohd Radzuan Hamat	9,968	41.78	▼7.99
PKR	Mohd Fami Zakaria	1,425	5.97	▲5.97
Total valid votes		23,856	100.00	
Total rejected ballots		0		
Unreturned ballots		0		
Turnout		23,856	78.34	▼9.46
Registered electors		30,453		
Majority		2,495	10.46	▲10.00
PAS hold		Swing		

Kelantan state election, 2013
Party	Candidate	Votes	%	∆%
PAS	Abdul Azziz Kadir	11,722	50.23	▼3.13
BN	Ilias Husain	11,620	49.77	▲3.13
Total valid votes		23,342	100.00	
Total rejected ballots		349		
Unreturned ballots		65		
Turnout		23,756	87.80	▲2.09
Registered electors		27,068		
Majority		102	0.46	▼6.26
PAS hold		Swing		

Kelantan state election, 2008
Party	Candidate	Votes	%	∆%
PAS	Abdul Azziz Kadir	9,729	53.36	▲6.99
BN	Muhamad Ab. Rahman	8,505	46.64	▼6.99
Total valid votes		18,234	100.00	
Total rejected ballots		264		
Unreturned ballots		37		
Turnout		18,535	85.71	▲2.01
Registered electors		21,624		
Majority		1,224	6.72	▼0.54
PAS gain from BN		Swing		?

Kelantan state election, 2004
Party	Candidate	Votes	%	∆%
BN	Ilias Husain	8,212	53.63	▲14.86
PAS	Shaary Awang	7,099	46.37	▼14.86
Total valid votes		15,311	100.00	
Total rejected ballots		279		
Unreturned ballots		40		
Turnout		15,630	83.70	▲4.47
Registered electors		18,673		
Majority		1,113	7.26	▼28.82
BN gain from PAS		Swing		?

Kelantan state election, 1999
Party	Candidate	Votes	%	∆%
PAS	Shaary Awang	8,720	61.23	▲61.23
BN	Wan Mohd Najib Wan Mohamad	5,522	38.77	▼6.33
Total valid votes		14,242	100.00	
Total rejected ballots		394		
Unreturned ballots		39		
Turnout		14,675	79.23	▲0.34
Registered electors		18,523		
Majority		3,198	36.08	▲26.28
PAS gain from S46		Swing		?

Kelantan state election, 1995
Party	Candidate	Votes	%	∆%
S46	Mohd Daud Ja'afar	7,623	54.90	▼8.31
BN	Chegu Noor	6,262	45.10	▲9.27
Total valid votes		13,885	100.00	
Total rejected ballots		359		
Unreturned ballots		49		
Turnout		14,293	78.89	▼3.49
Registered electors		18,117		
Majority		1,361	9.80	▼17.58
S46 hold		Swing		

Kelantan state election, 1990
Party	Candidate	Votes	%	∆%
S46	Mohd Daud Ja'afar	8,334	63.21	▲63.21
BN	Zainuddin Awang Hamat	4,724	35.83	▼19.18
Independent	Yusoff Salleh	127	0.96	▲0.96
Total valid votes		13,185	100.00	
Total rejected ballots		339		
Unreturned ballots		0		
Turnout		13,524	82.38	▲2.90
Registered electors		16,417		
Majority		3,610	27.38	▲17.36
S46 gain from BN		Swing		?

Kelantan state election, 1986
Party	Candidate	Votes	%	∆%
BN	Zainuddin Awang Hamat	6,208	55.01	▲5.62
PAS	Shaari Awang	5,078	44.99	▼2.49
Total valid votes		11,286	100.00	
Total rejected ballots		359		
Unreturned ballots		0		
Turnout		11,645	79.48	▼2.95
Registered electors		14,651		
Majority		1,130	10.01	▲8.11
BN hold		Swing		

Kelantan state election, 1982
Party	Candidate	Votes	%	∆%
BN	Mohamad Hassan	5,184	49.39	▼5.72
PAS	Shaary Awang	4,984	47.48	▲2.59
Independent	Mohd Zain Abdullah	329	3.13	▲3.13
Total valid votes		10,497	100.00	
Total rejected ballots		182		
Unreturned ballots		0		
Turnout		10,679	82.43	▲4.50
Registered electors		12,955		
Majority		200	1.91	▼8.31
BN hold		Swing		

Kelantan state election, 1978
Party	Candidate	Votes	%	∆%
BN	Mohamad Hassan	4,261	55.11	▼34.45
PAS	Mohd Yacob	3,471	44.89	▲44.89
Total valid votes		7,732	100.00	
Total rejected ballots		148		
Unreturned ballots		0		
Turnout		7,880	77.93	▲7.52
Registered electors		10,112		
Majority		790	10.22	▼68.90
BN hold		Swing		

Kelantan state election, 1974
Party	Candidate	Votes	%
BN	Mohd Yacob	6,056	89.56
Parti Rakyat Malaysia	Abdul Hadi Che Jaafar	706	10.44
Total valid votes		6,762	100.00
Total rejected ballots		136	
Unreturned ballots		0	
Turnout		6,898	70.41
Registered electors		9,797	
Majority		5,350	79.12
This was a new constituency created.
