= Kadok (state constituency) =

State constituency in Kelantan, Malaysia

Kadok (N24)
Kelantan constituency

State constituency
- Legislature: Kelantan State Legislative Assembly
MLA
Azami Mohd Nor
PN
- Constituency created: 1995
- First contested: 1995
- Last contested: 2023

Demographics
- Population (2020): 25,339
- Electors (2023): 21,833

Kadok is a state constituency in Kelantan, Malaysia, that has been represented in the Kelantan State Legislative Assembly.

The state constituency was first contested in 1995 and is mandated to return a single Assemblyman to the Kelantan State Legislative Assembly under the first-past-the-post voting system.

== Demographics ==
As of 2020, Kadok has a population of 25,339 people.

Ethnic breakdown of Kadok's electorate as of 2023
1. Malay (97.9%)
2. Chinese (1.43%)
3. Other ethnicities (0.63%)
4. Indian (0.03%)

== History ==
=== Polling districts ===
According to the Gazette issued on 30 March 2018, the Kadok constituency has a total of 9 polling districts.

State Constituency	Polling Districts	Code	Location
Kadok (N24)	Lachang	026/24/01	GIATMARA Ketereh
Kadok (N24)	Perol	026/24/02	SK Buloh Poh
Kadok (N24)	Berangan	026/24/03	SK Kadok
Kadok (N24)	Perol	026/24/04	SK Perol
Kadok (N24)	Kadok	026/24/05	SMK Kadok
Kadok (N24)	Kampung Talang	026/24/06	SMU (A) Hamidah Padang Lepai
Kadok (N24)	Dusun Rendah	026/25/07	SMU (A) Ittihadiah Tanjung Pagar
Kadok (N24)	Binjal	026/24/08	SK Kubang Kiat
Kadok (N24)	But Chengal	026/24/09	SK Kampong Chengal

=== Representation history ===
Members of the Legislative Assembly for Kadok
Assembly	No	Years	Member	Party
Constituency split from Ketereh
9th	N23	1995–1999	Shamsuddin Mohamed Shkuri Ab Rahman	PAS
10th	N23	1999–2004	Shamsuddin Mohamed Shkuri Ab Rahman	PAS
11th	N24	2004–2008	Shamsuddin Mohamed Shkuri Ab Rahman	PAS
12th	N24	2008–2013	Azami Mohd Nor	PR (PAS)
13th	N24	2013–2018	Azami Mohd Nor	PR (PAS)
14th	N24	2018–2020	Azami Mohd Nor	PAS
14th	N24	2020–2023	Azami Mohd Nor	PN (PAS)
15th	N24	2023–present	Azami Mohd Nor	PN (PAS)

== Election results ==
Kelantan state election, 2023
Party	Candidate	Votes	%	∆%
PAS	Azami Mohd Nor	10,442	75.95	▲23.45
PH	Mohd Azizan Razak	3,307	24.05	▲24.05
Total valid votes		13,749	100.00	
Total rejected ballots		109		
Unreturned ballots		34		
Turnout		13,892	63.63	▼19.51
Registered electors		21,833		
Majority		7,135	51.90	▲37.82
PAS hold		Swing		

Kelantan state election, 2018
Party	Candidate	Votes	%	∆%
PAS	Azami Mohd Nor	7,052	52.50	▼8.25
BN	Mohammad Azam Ismail	5,161	38.42	▼0.83
PKR	Che Ibrahim Mohamed	1,246	9.28	▲9.28
Total valid votes		13,432	100.00	
Total rejected ballots		205		
Unreturned ballots		150		
Turnout		13,787	83.14	▼2.87
Registered electors		16,583		
Majority		1,864	14.08	▼7.42
PAS hold		Swing		

Kelantan state election, 2013
Party	Candidate	Votes	%	∆%
PAS	Azami Mohd Nor	8,753	60.75	▲3.32
BN	Mohamad Basri Awang	5,656	39.25	▼3.32
Total valid votes		14,409	100.00	
Total rejected ballots		245		
Unreturned ballots		59		
Turnout		14,713	86.01	▲0.75
Registered electors		17,107		
Majority		3,097	21.49	▲6.64
PAS hold		Swing		

Kelantan state election, 2008
Party	Candidate	Votes	%	∆%
PAS	Azami Mohd Nor	6,972	57.43	▲3.83
BN	Roslan Ab Hamid	5,169	42.57	▼3.83
Total valid votes		12,141	100.00	
Total rejected ballots		136		
Unreturned ballots		31		
Turnout		12,308	85.26	▲4.72
Registered electors		14,436		
Majority		1,803	14.85	▲7.66
PAS hold		Swing		

Kelantan state election, 2004
Party	Candidate	Votes	%	∆%
PAS	Mohamed Shukri Ab Rahman	5,301	53.59	▼11.89
BN	Sharifuddin Drahman	4,590	46.41	▲11.89
Total valid votes		9,891	100.00	
Total rejected ballots		121		
Unreturned ballots		3		
Turnout		10,015	80.54	▲2.91
Registered electors		12,435		
Majority		711	7.19	▼23.79
PAS hold		Swing		

Kelantan state election, 1999
Party	Candidate	Votes	%	∆%
PAS	Mohamed Shukri Ab Rahman	6,738	65.49	▲9.10
BN	Mat Riffin Said	3,551	34.51	▼8.14
Total valid votes		10,289	100.00	
Total rejected ballots		186		
Unreturned ballots		9		
Turnout		10,484	77.62	▲0.04
Registered electors		13,506		
Majority		3,187	30.97	▲17.24
PAS hold		Swing		

Kelantan state election, 1995
Party	Candidate	Votes	%
PAS	Mohamed Shukri Ab Rahman	5,506	56.39
BN	Mohd Soberi Shafii	4,165	42.66
KITA	Ahmad Zailani Abdul Wahab	93	0.95
Total valid votes		9,764	100.00
Total rejected ballots		195	
Unreturned ballots		17	
Turnout		9,976	77.58
Registered electors		12,859	
Majority		1,341	13.73
This was a new constituency created.
