= Kemuning =

State constituency in Kelantan, Malaysia

Kemuning (N35)
Kelantan constituency

State constituency
- Legislature: Kelantan State Legislative Assembly
MLA
Ahmad Zakhran Mat Noor
PN
- Constituency created: 1994
- First contested: 1995
- Last contested: 2023

Demographics
- Electors (2023): 35,015

Kemuning is a state constituency in Kelantan, Malaysia, that has been represented in the Kelantan State Legislative Assembly.

The state constituency was first contested in 1995 and is mandated to return a single Assemblyman to the Kelantan State Legislative Assembly under the first-past-the-post voting system.

== Demographics ==
As of 2020, Kemuning has a population of 47,378 people.

Ethnic breakdown of Kemuning's electorate as of 2023
1. Malay (97.0%)
2. Chinese (2.38%)
3. Other ethnicities (0.49%)
4. Indian (0.14%)

== History ==
=== Polling districts ===
According to the Gazette issued on 30 March 2018, the Kemuning constituency has a total of 13 polling districts.

State Constituency	Polling Districts	Code	Location
Kemuning (N35）	Sungai Hala	029/35/01	SMK Hamzah
Kemuning (N35）	Kweng Hitam	029/35/02	SMK Machang
Kemuning (N35）	Pangkal Changgong	029/35/03	SMA Wataniah
Kemuning (N35）	Bandar Lama	029/35/04	SK Machang (1)
Kemuning (N35）	Bandar Bharu	029/35/05	SK Hamzah (1)
Kemuning (N35）	Bukit Tiu	029/35/06	SK Bukit Tiu
Kemuning (N35）	Ulu Sat	029/35/07	SK Belukar
Kemuning (N35）	Banggol Judah	029/35/08	SMU (A) Ahmadiah Banggol Judah
Kemuning (N35）	Bakar	029/35/09	SK Ayer Merah
Kemuning (N35）	Kemuning	029/35/10	SK Ayer Merah
Kemuning (N35）	Cherang Hangus	029/35/11	SK Jambu Lawar
Kemuning (N35）	Kampung Pel	029/35/12	SMK Seri Intan
Kemuning (N35）	Kampung Bunut	029/35/13	SMK Seri Intan

=== Representation History ===
Members of the Legislative Assembly for Kemuning
Assembly	No	Years	Member	Party
Constituency created from Banggol Judah and Gual Ipoh
9th	N34	1995–1999	Hassan Muhamad	PAS
10th	N34	1999–2004	Hassan Muhamad	PAS
11th	N35	2004–2008	Zakaria Yaacob	PAS
12th	N35	2008–2013	Wan Ahmad Lutfi Wan Sulaiman	PR (PAS)
13th	N35	2013–2018	Mohd Roseli Ismail	PR (PAS)
14th	N35	2018–2020	Mohd Roseli Ismail	PAS
14th	N35	2020–2023	Mohd Roseli Ismail	PN (PAS)
15th	N35	2023–present	Ahmad Zakhran Mat Noor	PN (PAS)

== Election results ==
Kelantan state election, 2023: Kemuning
Party	Candidate	Votes	%	∆%
PAS	Ahmad Zakhran Mat Noor	13,168	63.77	▲16.45
BN	Mohd Fakaarudin Ismail	7,481	36.23	▼6.18
Total valid votes		20,649	100.00	
Total rejected ballots		163		
Unreturned ballots		38		
Turnout		20,850	59.55	▼22.34
Registered electors		35,015		
Majority		5,687	27.54	▲22.63
PAS hold		Swing		

Kelantan state election, 2018: Kemuning
Party	Candidate	Votes	%	∆%
PAS	Mohd Roseli Ismail	9,969	47.32	▼5.39
BN	Eriandi Ismail	8,934	42.41	▼4.88
PKR	Ab Kadir Othman	2,163	10.27	▲10.27
Total valid votes		21,066	100.00	
Total rejected ballots		315		
Unreturned ballots		230		
Turnout		21,611	81.89	▼4.51
Registered electors		26,389		
Majority		1,035	4.91	▼0.51
PAS hold		Swing		

Kelantan state election, 2013: Kemuning
Party	Candidate	Votes	%	∆%
PAS	Mohd Roseli Ismail	10,049	52.71	▼0.33
BN	Eriandi Ismail	9,015	47.29	▲0.33
Total valid votes		19,064	100.00	
Total rejected ballots		228		
Unreturned ballots		52		
Turnout		19,344	86.40	▲2.71
Registered electors		22,385		
Majority		1,034	5.42	▼0.66
PAS hold		Swing		

Kelantan state election, 2008: Kemuning
Party	Candidate	Votes	%	∆%
PAS	Wan Ahmad Lutfi Wan Sulaiman	8,003	53.04	▲3.03
BN	Ahmad Jazlan Yaakub	7,087	46.96	▼3.03
Total valid votes		15,090	100.00	
Total rejected ballots		169		
Unreturned ballots		22		
Turnout		15,281	83.69	▲5.73
Registered electors		18,258		
Majority		916	6.08	▲6.06
PAS hold		Swing		

Kelantan state election, 2004: Kemuning
Party	Candidate	Votes	%	∆%
PAS	Zakaria Yaacob	6,078	50.01	▼7.17
BN	Wan Mohamad Zin Wan Mat Amin	6,076	49.99	▲7.17
Total valid votes		12,154	100.00	
Total rejected ballots		190		
Unreturned ballots		0		
Turnout		12,344	77.96	▲0.25
Registered electors		15,834		
Majority		2	0.02	▼14.34
PAS hold		Swing		

Kelantan state election, 1999: Kemuning
Party	Candidate	Votes	%	∆%
PAS	Hassan Muhamad	6,335	57.18	▲6.64
BN	Ismail Mamat	4,744	42.82	▼6.64
Total valid votes		11,079	100.00	
Total rejected ballots		209		
Unreturned ballots		9		
Turnout		11,297	77.71	▲1.21
Registered electors		14,537		
Majority		1,591	14.36	▲13.28
PAS hold		Swing		

Kelantan state election, 1995: Kemuning
Party	Candidate	Votes	%
PAS	Hassan Muhamad	4,759	50.54
BN	Ismail Mamat	4,657	49.46
Total valid votes		9,416	100.00
Total rejected ballots		152	
Unreturned ballots		20	
Turnout		9,588	76.50
Registered electors		12,533	
Majority		102	1.08
This was a new constituency created.
