= Kuala Balah =

State constituency in Kelantan, Malaysia

Kuala Balah (N38)
Kelantan constituency

State constituency
- Legislature: Kelantan State Legislative Assembly
MLA
Abdul Hadi Awang Kechil
PN
- Constituency created: 2003
- First contested: 2004
- Last contested: 2023

Demographics
- Electors (2023): 15,704

Kuala Balah is a state constituency in Kelantan, Malaysia, that has been represented in the Kelantan State Legislative Assembly.

The state constituency was first contested in 2004 and is mandated to return a single Assemblyman to the Kelantan State Legislative Assembly under the first-past-the-post voting system.

== Demographics ==
As of 2020, Kuala Balah has a population of 17,684 people.

Ethnic breakdown of Kuala Balah's electorate as of 2023
1. Malay (98.6%)
2. Other ethnicities (1.14%)
3. Indian (0.14%)
4. Chinese (0.09%)

== History ==
=== Polling districts ===
According to the Gazette issued on 30 March 2018, the Kuala Balah constituency has a total of 8 polling districts.

State Constituency	Polling Districts	Code	Location
Kuala Balah (N38）	Batu Melintang	030/38/01	SMK Batu Melintang
Kuala Balah (N38）	Pendok	030/38/02	SK Pendok
Kuala Balah (N38）	Sungai Long	030/38/03	SK Sungai Long
Kuala Balah (N38）	Lubok Bongor	030/38/04	SK Lubok Bongor
Kuala Balah (N38）	Kubor Datu	030/38/05	SK Kubor Datu
Kuala Balah (N38）	Jerimbong	030/38/06	SK Bukit Jering
Kuala Balah (N38）	Kedai Kuala Balah	030/38/07	SK Kuala Balah
Kuala Balah (N38）	Kampung Bharu Tg. Abd. Rahman Putra	030/38/08	SMK Kuala Balah

=== Representation History ===
Members of the Legislative Assembly for Kuala Balah
Assembly	No	Years	Member	Party
Constituency created from Pergau
11th	N38	2004–2008	Abd Aziz Derashid	BN (UMNO)
12th	N38	2008–2013	Abd Aziz Derashid	BN (UMNO)
13th	N38	2013–2018	Abd Aziz Derashid	BN (UMNO)
14th	N38	2018–2023	Abd Aziz Derashid	BN (UMNO)
15th	N38	2023–present	Abdul Hadi Awang Kechil	PN (PAS)

== Election results ==
Kelantan state election, 2023: Kuala Balah
Party	Candidate	Votes	%	∆%
PAS	Abdul Hadi Awang Kechil	6,186	63.31	▲17.57
BN	Mohd Yamin Anuar Mat Zain	3,585	36.69	▼17.57
Total valid votes		9,771	100.00	
Total rejected ballots		88		
Unreturned ballots		10		
Turnout		9,869	62.84	▼22.19
Registered electors		15,704		
Majority		2,601	26.62	▲18.10
PAS gain from BN		Swing		?

Kelantan state election, 2018: Kuala Balah
Party	Candidate	Votes	%	∆%
BN	Abdul Aziz Derashid	5,592	54.26	▼5.85
PAS	Mohd Apandi Mohamad	4,714	45.74	▲5.85
Total valid votes		10,306	100.00	
Total rejected ballots		130		
Unreturned ballots		114		
Turnout		10,550	85.03	▼4.97
Registered electors		12,407		
Majority		878	8.52	▼11.70
BN hold		Swing		

Kelantan state election, 2013: Kuala Balah
Party	Candidate	Votes	%	∆%
BN	Abd Aziz Derashid	6,173	60.11	▲1.65
PKR	Ramlan Mat	4,097	39.89	▼1.65
Total valid votes		10,270	100.00	
Total rejected ballots		161		
Unreturned ballots		22		
Turnout		10,453	90.00	▲4.00
Registered electors		11,608		
Majority		2,076	20.22	▲3.30
BN hold		Swing		

Kelantan state election, 2008: Kuala Balah
Party	Candidate	Votes	%	∆%
BN	Abd Aziz Derashid	4,772	58.46	▼3.89
PKR	Mat Sulaiman Daud	3,391	41.54	▲41.54
Total valid votes		8,163	100.00	
Total rejected ballots		142		
Unreturned ballots		85		
Turnout		8,390	86.00	▲1.67
Registered electors		9,756		
Majority		1,381	16.92	▼7.78
BN hold		Swing		

Kelantan state election, 2004: Kuala Balah
Party	Candidate	Votes	%
BN	Abd Aziz Derashid	4,515	62.35
PAS	Mat Rasid Mat Jaais	2,726	37.65
Total valid votes		7,241	100.00
Total rejected ballots		109	
Unreturned ballots		0	
Turnout		7,350	84.33
Registered electors		8,716	
Majority		1,789	24.70
This was a new constituency created.
