= 2023 Kelantan state election =

Malaysian state election

- 12 August 2023

All 45 seats in the Kelantan State Legislative Assembly 23 seats needed for a majority
- Turnout: 60.96%
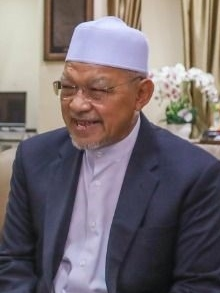
	Majority party	Minority party
		PH-BN
Leader	Ahmad Yakob	Ahmad Jazlan Yaakub; Muhammad Husin
Party	PAS	UMNO; AMANAH
Alliance	Perikatan Nasional Parties: PAS; BERSATU	Barisan Nasional; Pakatan Harapan Parties: UMNO; PKR; AMANAH
Leader since	2 July 2022	16 July 2018; 9 March 2021
Leader's seat	Pasir Pekan	Ahmad Jazlan: Did not contest Muhammad: Did not contest
Last election	37 seats, 54.44% (Note: New coalition formed in 2020. These numbers are the total seats and vote share of BERSATU, PAS and GERAKAN in the last election. The parties were previously part of Pakatan Harapan, Gagasan Sejahtera and Barisan Nasional.)	8 seats, 45.18% (Note: All 8 seats won by BN; vote tally is total won by PH and BN excluding BERSATU, which left PH in 2020.)
Seats before	37	7
Seats won	43	2
Seat change	▲6	▼6
Popular vote	589,838	198,028
Percentage	69.24%	30.52%
Swing	▲14.80%	▼14.66%
Menteri Besar Kelantan before election
Ahmad Yakob
Perikatan Nasional (PAS)
Menteri Besar Kelantan after election
Mohd. Nassuruddin Daud
Perikatan Nasional (PAS)

The 15th Kelantan state election were held on 12 August 2023 to elect the State Assembly members of the 15th Kelantan State Legislative Assembly, the legislature of the Malaysian state of Kelantan.

Kelantan is one of the states which did not dissolve simultaneously with Dewan Rakyat on 10 October 2022. It was decided by Perikatan Nasional on 13 October 2022.

The governing Perikatan Nasional (PN) coalition led by Parti Islam Se-Malaysia (PAS) won 43 of 45 seats in a landslide, achieving a supermajority in the legislature, and continuing PAS' dominance in the state since 1990. The Barisan Nasional (BN) – Pakatan Harapan (PH) electoral pact won the remaining 2 seats, with BN and PH each winning 1 seat, and becoming the main opposition in the state assembly.

This was the first Kelantan state election not held concurrently with the national general election since 1978, when Kelantan held its election in March that year as opposed to the general election date in July.

== Background ==
For the state elections, Perikatan Nasional has decided to use the PAS logo and name for all its candidate in Kelantan and Terengganu, regardless of the candidate party.

== Constituencies ==
All 45 constituencies within Kelantan, which constitute the Kelantan State Legislative Assembly, were contested during the election.

Electoral map of Kelantan, showing all 45 constituencies

Breakdown of 2022 Malaysian general election result by state constituency in 2022, where PH in Red, PN in Blue-green and BN in blue

== Composition before dissolution ==
Government		Opposition
PN		BN
37		7
36	1	7
PAS	BERSATU	UMNO

== Timeline ==
The key dates are listed below.

Date	Event
13 October 2022	Perikatan Nasional decides not to dissolve the 14th Kelantan State Legislative Assembly.
22 June 2023	Dissolution of the Kelantan State Legislative Assembly.
5 July 2023	Issue of the Writ of Election
29 July 2023	Nomination Day
29 July–11 August 2023	Campaigning Period
8–11 August 2023	Early Polling Days For Postal, Overseas and Advance Voters
12 August 2023	Polling Day

== Retiring incumbent(s) ==
The following members of the 14th State Legislative Assembly did not contest this election.

No.	State Constituency	Departing MLA	Coalition (Party)	Date confirmed	First elected	Reason
N22	Melor	Md Yusnan Yusof	PN (PAS)	30 April 2021	2013	Died in office.
N9	Kota Lama	Anuar Tan Abdullah	PN (PAS)	2 July 2023	1999	Retired from politics.
N06	Chempaka	Ahmad Fathan Mahmood	PN (PAS)	27 July 2023	2015	Dropped by party.
N10	Bunut Payong	Ramli Mamat	PN (PAS)	27 July 2023	2013	Dropped by party.
N12	Pengkalan Pasir	Hanifa Ahmad	PN (PAS)	27 July 2023	2008	Dropped by party.
N15	Gual Periok	Mohamad Awang	PN (PAS)	27 July 2023	2008	Dropped by party.
N16	Apam Putra	Abdul Rasul Mohamed	PN (PAS)	27 July 2023	2013	Dropped by party.
N17	Salor	Saiful Adli Abu Bakar	PN (PAS)	27 July 2023	2018	Dropped by party.
N19	Demit	Mumtaz Md. Nawi	PN (PAS)	27 July 2023	2013	Dropped by party (MP for Tumpat)
N20	Tawang	Hassan Mohamood	PN (PAS)	27 July 2023	1995	Dropped by party
N22	Jelawat	Abdul Azziz Kadir	PN (PAS)	27 July 2023	2008	Dropped by party
N30	Limbongan	Mohd Nazlan Mohamed Hasbullah	PN (PAS)	27 July 2023	2013	Dropped by party
N35	Kemuning	Mohd Roseli Ismail	PN (PAS)	27 July 2023	2013	Dropped by party
N39	Mengkebang	Muhammad Mat Sulaiman	PN (PAS)	27 July 2023	2018	Dropped by party
N37	Ayer Lanas	Mustapa Mohamed	PN (BERSATU)	2 November 2022	2004	Retired from politics.
N25	Kok Lanas	Md Alwi Che Ahmad	BN (UMNO)	27 April 2023	2008	Retired from politics.
N27	Gual Ipoh	Bakri Mustapha	BN (UMNO)	21 July 2023	2013	Dropped by party.
N38	Kuala Balah	Abd Aziz Derashid	BN (UMNO)	21 July 2023	2004	Dropped by party.

== Electoral candidates ==
Names in bold are the confirmed winners in the 2023 state election.

No.	Parliamentary Constituency	No.	State Constituency	Voters	Incumbent State Assemblymen	Coalition (Party)	Political coalitions and parties							
No.	Parliamentary Constituency	No.	State Constituency	Voters	Incumbent State Assemblymen	Coalition (Party)	Barisan Nasional + Pakatan Harapan		Perikatan Nasional		Other parties/Independents			
No.	Parliamentary Constituency	No.	State Constituency	Voters	Incumbent State Assemblymen	Coalition (Party)	Candidate name	Party	Candidate name	Party	Candidate name	Party	Candidiate Name	Party
P019	Tumpat	N01	Pengkalan Kubor	36,492	Wan Roslan Wan Hamat	**PN** (**PAS**)	Zulkifli Abdullah	UMNO	**Wan Roslan Wan Hamat**	PAS				
P019	Tumpat	N02	Kelaboran	38,198	Mohd Adanan Hassan	**PN** (**PAS**)	Mohd Rosdi Razali	UMNO	**Mohd Adanan Hassan**	PAS				
P019	Tumpat	N03	Pasir Pekan	39,119	Ahmad Yakob	**PN** (**PAS**)	Zamakhsari Ibrahim	PKR	**Ahmad Yakob**	PAS				
P019	Tumpat	N04	Wakaf Bharu	36,439	Mohd Rusli Abdullah	**PN** (**PAS**)	Abdul Mannan Md Said	UMNO	**Mohd Rusli Abdullah**	PAS				
P020	Pengkalan Chepa	N05	Kijang	30,405	Izani Husin	**PN** (**PAS**)	Haris Hussin	UMNO	**Izani Husin**	PAS				
P020	Pengkalan Chepa	N06	Chempaka	34,641	Ahmad Fathan Mahmood	**PN** (**PAS**)	Nik Normi Nik Ayub	UMNO	**Nik Asma' Bahrum Nik Abdullah**	PAS	Ibrahim Sulong	**IND**		
P020	Pengkalan Chepa	N07	Panchor	42,768	Mohd Amar Abdullah	**PN** (**PAS**)	Syed Mohd Alidustur Syed Mohd Zain	PKR	**Mohd Amar Abdullah**	PAS				
P021	Kota Bharu	N08	Tanjong Mas	45,579	Rohani Ibrahim	**PN** (**PAS**)	Zinda Khalil Sastro Hassan	PKR	**Rohani Ibrahim**	PAS				
P021	Kota Bharu	N09	Kota Lama	33,043	Tan Teng Loon @ Anuar Tan Abdullah	**PN** (**PAS**)	**Hafidzah Mustakim**	AMANAH	Zamri Ismail	PAS	Andy Tan Boon Kian	**PRM**	Izat Bukhary Ismail Bukhary	**IND**
P021	Kota Bharu	N10	Bunut Payong	36,844	Ramli Mamat	**PN** (**PAS**)	Mohamed Hasnan Che Hussin	UMNO	**Shaari Mat Yaman**	PAS				
P022	Pasir Mas	N11	Tendong	31,768	Rozi Muhammad	**PN** (**PAS**)	Noor Hariri Mohamed Noor	UMNO	**Rozi Muhammad**	PAS	Suzainal Adnan Sukri	**IND**		
P022	Pasir Mas	N12	Pengkalan Pasir	33,007	Hanifa Ahmad	**PN** (**PAS**)	Rushdan Mustafa	AMANAH	**Mohamad Nasriff Daud**	PAS				
P022	Pasir Mas	N13	Meranti	29,980	Mohd. Nassuruddin Daud	**PN** (**PAS**)	Zahari Omar	UMNO	**Mohd. Nassuruddin Daud**	PAS				
P023	Rantau Panjang	N14	Chetok	29,111	Zuraidin Abdullah	**PN** (**PAS**)	Ezzat Zahrim Hanuzi	PKR	**Zuraidin Abdullah**	PAS				
P023	Rantau Panjang	N15	Gual Periok	36,081	Mohamad Awang	**PN** (**PAS**)	Anuar Mohamad	UMNO	**Kamaruzaman Mohamad**	PAS				
P023	Rantau Panjang	N16	Apam Putra	28,834	Abdul Rasul Mohamed	**PN** (**PAS**)	Akbar Salim	UMNO	**Zamakhshari Mohamad**	PAS				
P024	Kubang Kerian	N17	Salor	36,294	Saiful Adli Abu Bakar	**PN** (**PAS**)	Mohamad Husain	UMNO	**Saizol Ismail**	PAS				
P024	Kubang Kerian	N18	Pasir Tumboh	37,498	Abd Rahman Yunus	**PN** (**PAS**)	Naziratul Aini Mohd Sayuty	PKR	**Abd Rahman Yunus**	PAS				
P024	Kubang Kerian	N19	Demit	40,561	Mumtaz Md. Nawi	**PN** (**PAS**)	Ismail Ghani	AMANAH	**Mohd Asri Mat Daud**	PAS				
P025	Bachok	N20	Tawang	43,441	Hassan Mohamood	**PN** (**PAS**)	Mat Isa Che Dir	AMANAH	**Harun Ismail**	PAS				
P025	Bachok	N21	Pantai Irama	40,512	Mohd Huzaimy Che Husin	**PN** (**PAS**)	Zakiah Md Noor	UMNO	**Mohd Huzaimy Che Husin**	PAS				
P025	Bachok	N22	Jelawat	40,012	Abdul Azziz Kadir	**PN** (**PAS**)	Yusri Che Noh	UMNO	**Zameri Mat Nawang**	PAS	Zulkarnain Haron	**IND**		
P026	Ketereh	N23	Melor	28,387	Vacant		Azmi Ishak	UMNO	**Wan Rohimi Wan Daud**	PAS				
P026	Ketereh	N24	Kadok	21,833	Azami Md. Nor	**PN** (**PAS**)	Mohd Azizan Razak	AMANAH	**Azami Md. Nor**	PAS				
P026	Ketereh	N25	Kok Lanas	35,679	Md Alwi Che Ahmad	**BN** (**UMNO**)	Ahmad Deraman	UMNO	**Mohamed Farid Mohamed Zawawi**	BERSATU				
P027	Tanah Merah	N26	Bukit Panau	50,237	Abdul Fattah Mahmood	**PN** (**PAS**)	Samsu Adabi	AMANAH	**Abdul Fattah Mahmood**	PAS				
P027	Tanah Merah	N27	Gual Ipoh	25,718	Bakri Mustapha	**BN** (**UMNO**)	Zuhairi Zakaria	UMNO	**Bahari Mohamad Nor**	BERSATU				
P027	Tanah Merah	N28	Kemahang	23,258	Md. Anizam Ab. Rahman	**PN** (**PAS**)	Mazli Mustafa	UMNO	**Md. Anizam Ab. Rahman**	PAS				
P028	Pasir Puteh	N29	Selising	28,725	Tuan Mohd Saripuddin Tuan Ismail	**PN** (**PAS**)	Hashim Ismail	UMNO	**Tuan Mohd Saripuddin Tuan Ismail**	PAS				
P028	Pasir Puteh	N30	Limbongan	35,393	Mohd Nazlan Mohamed Hasbullah	**PN** (**PAS**)	Kamaruddin Mat Zin	PKR	**Nor Asilah Mohamed Zin**	PAS				
P028	Pasir Puteh	N31	Semerak	26,781	Wan Hassan Wan Ibrahim	**PN** (**PAS**)	Marshella Ali	UMNO	**Nor Sham Sulaiman**	PAS				
P028	Pasir Puteh	N32	Gaal	22,671	Mohd Rodzi Ja'afar	**PN** (**PAS**)	Mohd Aliff Nasir Mt Nasin	UMNO	**Mohd Rodzi Ja'afar**	PAS				
P029	Machang	N33	Pulai Chondong	28,169	Azhar Salleh	**PN** (**PAS**)	Muhammad Fakhran Che Jusoh	UMNO	**Azhar Salleh**	PAS				
P029	Machang	N34	Temangan	26,012	Mohamed Fadzli Hassan	**PN** (**PAS**)	Abdul Kadir Othman	AMANAH	**Mohamed Fadzli Hassan**	PAS	Fauzi Seman	**IND**		
P029	Machang	N35	Kemuning	35,015	Mohd Roseli Ismail	**PN** (**PAS**)	Mohd Fakaarudin Ismail	UMNO	**Ahmad Zakhran Mat Noor**	PAS				
P030	Jeli	N36	Bukit Bunga	21,722	Mohd Adhan Kechik	**BN** (**UMNO**)	Mohd Adhan Kechik	UMNO	**Mohd Almidi Jaafar**	BERSATU				
P030	Jeli	N37	Ayer Lanas	22,468	Mustapa Mohamed	**PN** (**BERSATU**)	Nasrul Hadi Kamarulzaman	UMNO	**Kamarudin Md Nor**	BERSATU				
P030	Jeli	N38	Kuala Balah	15,704	Abd Aziz Derashid	**BN** (**UMNO**)	Mohd Yamiin Anuar Mat Zain	UMNO	**Abdul Hadi Awang Kechil**	PAS				
P031	Kuala Krai	N39	Mengkebang	26,843	Muhammad Mat Sulaiman	**PN** (**PAS**)	Mohd Shukri Ishak	PKR	**Zubir Abu Bakar**	PAS				
P031	Kuala Krai	N40	Guchil	27,785	Hilmi Abdullah	**PN** (**PAS**)	Zuber Hasan	UMNO	**Hilmi Abdullah**	PAS				
P031	Kuala Krai	N41	Manek Urai	22,611	Mohd Fauzi Abdullah	**PN** (**PAS**)	Suzali Adlina Sukri	UMNO	**Mohd Fauzi Abdullah**	PAS				
P031	Kuala Krai	N42	Dabong	15,255	Ku Mohd Zaki Ku Hussien	**PN** (**PAS**)	Ahmad Firdaus Mohamad	UMNO	**Ku Mohd Zaki Ku Hussin**	PAS				
P032	Gua Musang	N43	Nenggiri	20,219	Ab Aziz Yusoff	**BN** (**UMNO**)	Ab Aziz Yusoff	UMNO	**Mohd Azizi Abu Naim**	BERSATU				
P032	Gua Musang	N44	Paloh	21,162	Amran Arifin	**BN** (**UMNO**)	Amran Arifin	UMNO	**Shaari Mat Hussain**	BERSATU				
P032	Gua Musang	N45	Galas	29,638	Mohd Syahbuddin Hashim	**BN** (**UMNO**)	**Mohd Syahbuddin Hashim**	UMNO	Mohd Tarmizi Abd Rahman	PAS				

== Opinion polls ==
Polling firm	Dates conducted	Sample size	PH+BN	PN	Oth	Lead	Ref
Ilham Centre	29 July – 8 August 2023	2,304	13%	65%	22%	PN +43%	

== Results ==
Party or alliance		Votes	%	Seats	+/–
Perikatan Nasional	Malaysian Islamic Party	532,041	62.46	37	0
Perikatan Nasional	Malaysian United Indigenous Party	57,797	6.78	6	+6
Perikatan Nasional	Total	589,838	69.24	43	+6
Pakatan Harapan + Barisan Nasional	United Malays National Organisation	178,437	20.95	1	–7
Pakatan Harapan + Barisan Nasional	People's Justice Party	41,572	4.88	0	0
Pakatan Harapan + Barisan Nasional	National Trust Party	39,974	4.69	1	+1
Pakatan Harapan + Barisan Nasional	Total	259,983	30.52	2	–6
Parti Rakyat Malaysia		126	0.01	0	New
Independents		1,894	0.22	0	0
Total		851,841	100.00	45	–

=== By parliamentary constituency ===
PN won 13 out of 14 parliamentary constituency by average percentages.

No.	Constituency	Pakatan Harapan + Barisan Nasional	Perikatan Nasional	Member of Parliament
P019	Tumpat	30.27%	69.73%	Mumtaz Md Nawi
P020	Pengkalan Chepa	26.56%	73.10%	Ahmad Marzuk Shaary
P021	Kota Bharu	39.56%	60.13%	Takiyuddin Hassan
P022	Pasir Mas	28.62%	69.06%	Ahmad Fadhli Shaari
P023	Rantau Panjang	33.61%	66.39%	Siti Zailah Mohd Yusof
P024	Kubang Kerian	25.54%	74.46%	Tuan Ibrahim Tuan Man
P025	Bachok	26.39%	73.25%	Mohd Syahir Che Sulaiman
P026	Ketereh	29.26%	70.74%	Khlir Mohd Nor
P027	Tanah Merah	23.62%	76.38%	Ikmal Hisham Abdul Aziz
P028	Pasir Puteh	29.55%	70.45%	Nik Muhammad Zawawi Salleh
P029	Machang	31.85%	67.75%	Wan Ahmad Fayhsal Wan Ahmad Kamal
P030	Jeli	34.00%	66.00%	Zahari Kechik
P031	Kuala Krai	26.35%	73.65%	Abdul Latiff Abdul Rahman
P032	Gua Musang	50.37%	49.63%	Mohd Azizi Abu Naim

=== Seats that changed allegiance ===
No.	Seat	Previous Party (2018)	Current Party (2023)
N09	Kota Lama	PAS	Pakatan Harapan (AMANAH)
N25	Kok Lanas	Barisan Nasional (UMNO)	Perikatan Nasional (BERSATU)
N27	Gual Ipoh	Barisan Nasional (UMNO)	Perikatan Nasional (BERSATU)
N36	Bukit Bunga	Barisan Nasional (UMNO)	Perikatan Nasional (BERSATU)
N37	Ayer Lanas	Barisan Nasional (UMNO)	Perikatan Nasional (BERSATU)
N38	Kuala Balah	Barisan Nasional (UMNO)	Perikatan Nasional (PAS)
N43	Nenggiri	Barisan Nasional (UMNO)	Perikatan Nasional (BERSATU)
N44	Paloh	Barisan Nasional (UMNO)	Perikatan Nasional (BERSATU)

== Aftermath ==
Prior to the state elections, reports suggesting Ahmad Yakob, two-term Menteri Besar, will not continue in the role if PN won the election. The reports were confirmed by Ahmad, who is the PAS state commissioner and MLA for Pasir Pekan, on 12 August.

Mohd. Nassuruddin Daud, elected MLA for Meranti, were sworn in as the new Menteri Besar of Kelantan on 15 August, replacing Ahmad. Along with Nassuruddin, MLA for Temangan Mohamed Fadzli Hassan were sworn in as Deputy Menteri Besar, with 9 other EXCO members also sworn in on the same date.

On 7 November 2023, MLA for Nenggiri Mohd Azizi Abu Naim declared his support for Prime Minister Anwar Ibrahim's government. Due to Azizi's action violating the party's constitution, BERSATU revoked the memberships of his and 5 other politicians who also declared support for Anwar, and seeks to vacate the seats of the 6 politicians. The seat of Nenggiri was declared vacant by the Speaker of the Kelantan State Legislative Assembly, Mohd Amar Abdullah, on 19 June 2024, paving way for by-election of the seat. The by-election were won by UMNO, turning back the seat into BN's hands a year after the state election.
