= Gual Ipoh =

State constituency in Kelantan, Malaysia

Gual Ipoh (N27)
Kelantan constituency

State constituency
- Legislature: Kelantan State Legislative Assembly
MLA
Bahari Mohamad Nor
PN
- Constituency created: 1974
- First contested: 1974
- Last contested: 2023

Demographics
- Electors (2023): 25,718

Gual Ipoh is a state constituency in Kelantan, Malaysia, that has been represented in the Kelantan State Legislative Assembly.

The state constituency was first contested in 1974 and is mandated to return a single Assemblyman to the Kelantan State Legislative Assembly under the first-past-the-post voting system.

== Demographics ==
As of 2020, Gual Ipoh has a population of 30,331 people.

Ethnic breakdown of Gual Ipoh's electorate as of 2023
1. Malay (97.5%)
2. Indian (1.42%)
3. Chinese (0.66%)
4. Other ethnicities (0.47%)

== History ==
=== Polling districts ===
According to the Gazette issued on 30 March 2018, the Gual Ipoh constituency has a total of 13 polling districts.

State Constituency	Polling Districts	Code	Location
Gual Ipoh (N27）	Kuala Paku	027/27/01	SK Ipoh
Gual Ipoh (N27）	Bechah Laut	027/27/02	SK Bechah Laut
Gual Ipoh (N27）	Pekan Gual Ipoh	027/27/03	SMK Ipoh
Gual Ipoh (N27）	Ulu Kusial	027/27/04	SK Ulu Kusial
Gual Ipoh (N27）	Bukit Durian	027/27/05	SK Bukit Durian
Gual Ipoh (N27）	Terasil	027/27/06	SK Kulim
Gual Ipoh (N27）	Tebing Tinggi	027/27/07	SK Tebing Tinggi
Gual Ipoh (N27）	Kongsi Lima	027/27/08	SK Kampong Panjang
Gual Ipoh (N27）	Kerilla	027/27/09	SMK Ladang Kerilla
Gual Ipoh (N27）	Kuala Tiga	027/27/10	SK Kuala Tiga
Gual Ipoh (N27）	Blok Sokor	027/27/11	SK Sokor
Gual Ipoh (N27）	Kg Peralla	027/27/12	SK Peralla
Gual Ipoh (N27）	Tok Che Dol	027/27/13	SK Tok Che Dol

=== Representation history ===
Members of the Legislative Assembly for Gual Ipoh
Assembly	No	Years	Member	Party
Constituency created from Tanah Merah Timor
4th	N24	1974–1978	Mustafa Yaakub	BN (UMNO)
5th	N24	1978–1982	Mustafa Yaakub	BN (UMNO)
6th	N24	1982–1986	Mustafa Yaakub	BN (UMNO)
7th	N31	1986–1990	Mustafa Yaakub	BN (UMNO)
8th	N31	1990–1995	Tengku Alang Tengku Sulong	S46
9th	N27	1995–1996	Tengku Alang Tengku Sulong	S46
9th	N27	1996–1999	Tengku Alang Tengku Sulong	BN (UMNO)
10th	N27	1999–2004	Muhamad Kamil Harun	PAS
11th	N27	2004–2008	Hashim Safin	BN (UMNO)
12th	N27	2008–2013	Wan Yusoff Wan Mustafa	PR (PAS)
13th	N27	2013–2018	Mohd Bakri Mustapha	BN (UMNO)
14th	N27	2018–2023	Mohd Bakri Mustapha	BN (UMNO)
15th	N27	2023–present	Bahari Mohamad Nor	PN (BERSATU)

== Election results ==
Kelantan state election, 2023: Gual Ipoh
Party	Candidate	Votes	%	∆%
PAS	Bahari Mohamad Nor	10,320	70.26	▲26.20
BN	Zuhairi Zakaria	4,368	29.74	▼23.10
Total valid votes		14,688	100.00	
Total rejected ballots		109		
Unreturned ballots		25		
Turnout		14,822	57.63	▼24.64
Registered electors		25,718		
Majority		5,952	40.52	▲31.73
PAS gain from BN		Swing		?

Kelantan state election, 2018: Gual Ipoh
Party	Candidate	Votes	%	∆%
BN	Bakri @ Mohd Bakri Mustapha	8,509	52.84	▼2.18
PAS	Wan Yusoff W Mustafa	7,094	44.06	▼0.92
PKR	Mohd Soba Hussin	499	3.10	▲3.10
Total valid votes		16,102	100.00	
Total rejected ballots		280		
Unreturned ballots		112		
Turnout		16,494	82.27	▼4.13
Registered electors		20,048		
Majority		1,415	8.79	▼1.25
BN hold		Swing		

Kelantan state election, 2013: Gual Ipoh
Party	Candidate	Votes	%	∆%
BN	Mohd Bakri Mustapha	7,689	55.02	▲12.95
PAS	Wan Yusoff Wan Mustafa	6,285	44.98	▼12.95
Total valid votes		13,974	100.00	
Total rejected ballots		182		
Unreturned ballots		30		
Turnout		14,186	86.40	▲4.27
Registered electors		16,423		
Majority		1,404	10.04	▼5.82
BN gain from PAS		Swing		?

Kelantan state election, 2008: Gual Ipoh
Party	Candidate	Votes	%	∆%
PAS	Wan Yusoff Wan Mustafa	6,073	57.93	▲14.01
BN	Hashim Safin	4,410	42.07	▼14.01
Total valid votes		10,483	100.00	
Total rejected ballots		155		
Unreturned ballots		2		
Turnout		10,640	82.13	▲1.31
Registered electors		12,955		
Majority		1,663	15.86	▲3.70
PAS gain from BN		Swing		?

Kelantan state election, 2004: Gual Ipoh
Party	Candidate	Votes	%	∆%
BN	Hashim Safin	5,149	56.08	▲10.84
PAS	Wan Yusoff Wan Mustafa	4,033	43.92	▼10.84
Total valid votes		9,182	100.00	
Total rejected ballots		163		
Unreturned ballots		0		
Turnout		9,345	80.82	▲2.33
Registered electors		11,563		
Majority		1,116	12.16	▲2.64
BN gain from PAS		Swing		?

Kelantan state election, 1999: Gual Ipoh
Party	Candidate	Votes	%	∆%
PAS	Muhamad Kamil Harun	5,200	54.76	▲54.76
BN	Tengku Alang Tengku Sulong	4,296	45.24	▼4.12
Total valid votes		9,496	100.00	
Total rejected ballots		183		
Unreturned ballots		2		
Turnout		9,681	78.49	▲0.71
Registered electors		12,334		
Majority		904	9.52	▲8.24
PAS gain from S46		Swing		?

Kelantan state election, 1995: Gual Ipoh
Party	Candidate	Votes	%	∆%
S46	Tengku Alang Tengku Sulong	4,582	50.64	▼7.77
BN	Hassan Yusof	4,466	49.36	▲8.77
Total valid votes		9,048	100.00	
Total rejected ballots		194		
Unreturned ballots		10		
Turnout		9,252	77.78	▼4.27
Registered electors		11,895		
Majority		116	1.28	▼16.54
S46 hold		Swing		

Kelantan state election, 1990: Gual Ipoh
Party	Candidate	Votes	%	∆%
S46	Tengku Alang Tengku Sulong	4,218	58.41	▲58.41
BN	Mustafa Yaakub	2,931	40.59	▼22.30
Independent	Mat Zin Abdul Rahman	72	1.00	▲1.00
Total valid votes		7,221	100.00	
Total rejected ballots		239		
Unreturned ballots		0		
Turnout		7,460	82.05	▲3.70
Registered electors		9,092		
Majority		1,287	17.82	▼7.96
S46 gain from BN		Swing		?

Kelantan state election, 1986: Gual Ipoh
Party	Candidate	Votes	%	∆%
BN	Mustafa Yaakub	3,859	62.89	▼0.86
PAS	Stapa Awang Ali	2,277	37.11	▲0.86
Total valid votes		6,136	100.00	
Total rejected ballots		272		
Unreturned ballots		0		
Turnout		6,408	78.35	▼6.51
Registered electors		8,179		
Majority		1,582	25.78	▼1.73
BN hold		Swing		

Kelantan state election, 1982: Gual Ipoh
Party	Candidate	Votes	%	∆%
BN	Mustafa Yaakub	4,744	63.75	▼2.36
PAS	Othman Hassan	2,697	36.25	▲21.15
Total valid votes		7,441	100.00	
Total rejected ballots		136		
Unreturned ballots		0		
Turnout		7,577	84.86	▲3.52
Registered electors		8,929		
Majority		2,047	27.51	▼19.81
BN hold		Swing		

Kelantan state election, 1978: Gual Ipoh
Party	Candidate	Votes	%	∆%
BN	Mustafa Yaakub	3,859	66.11	▼14.26
Pan-Malaysian Islamic Front	Shafii Abdul Rahman	1,097	18.79	▲18.79
PAS	Mohd. Jaih Mat Piah	881	15.09	▲15.09
Total valid votes		5,837	100.00	
Total rejected ballots		56		
Unreturned ballots		0		
Turnout		5,893	81.34	▼1.72
Registered electors		7,245		
Majority		2,762	47.32	▼13.42
BN hold		Swing		

Kelantan state election, 1974: Gual Ipoh
Party	Candidate	Votes	%
BN	Mustafa Yaakub	4,405	80.37
Independent	Shafii Abdul Rahman	1,076	19.63
Total valid votes		5,481	100.00
Total rejected ballots		139	
Unreturned ballots		0	
Turnout		5,620	83.06
Registered electors		6,766	
Majority		3,329	60.74
This was a new constituency created.
