= Abdul Fattah Mahmood =

Malaysian politician

Yang Berhormat Dato' Abdul Fattah Mahmood DJMK MLA
- عبدالفتاح محمود
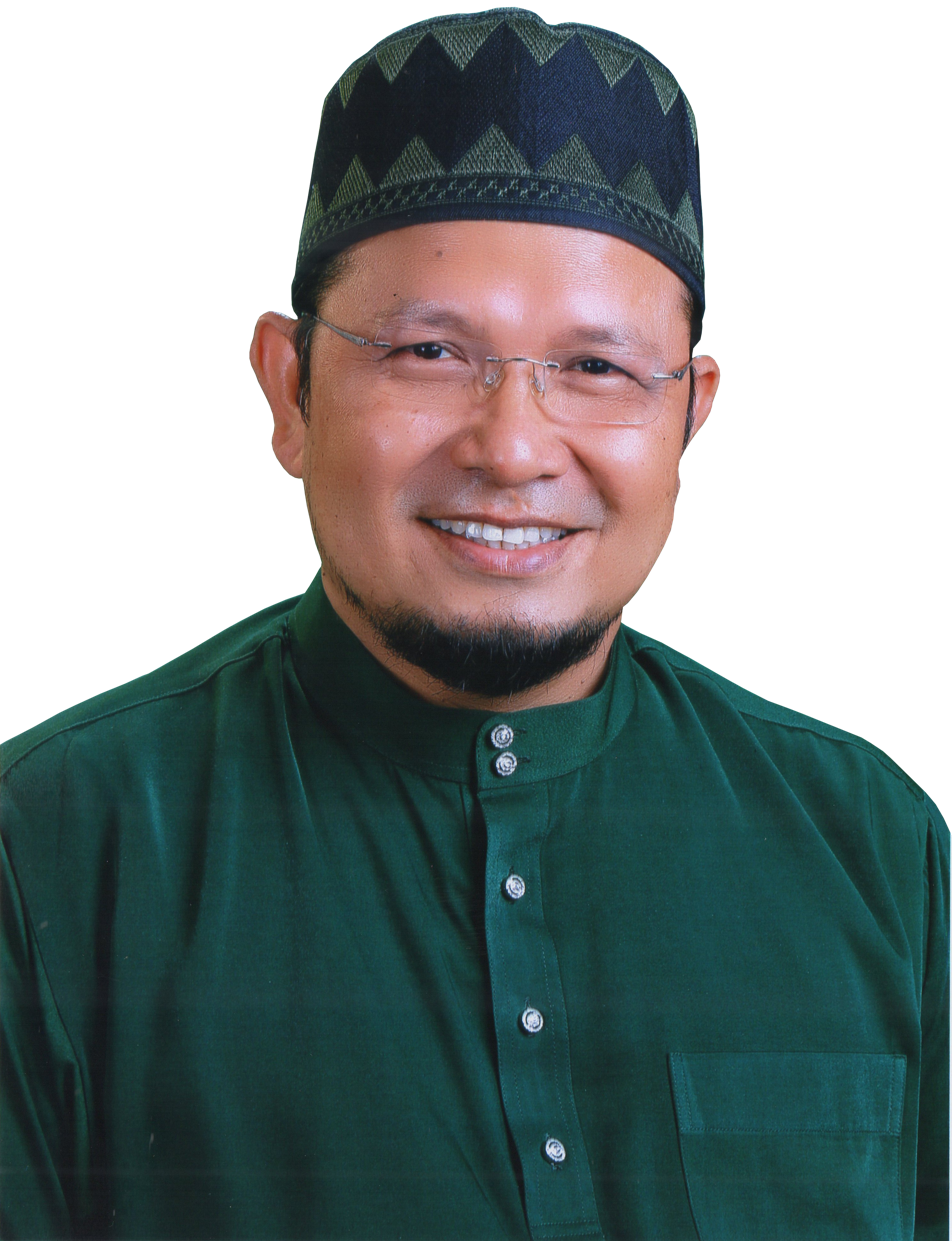

Deputy Speaker of the Kelantan State Legislative Assembly
- In office 2018–2023
- Monarch: Muhammad V
- Speaker: Abdullah Ya'kub
- Menteri Besar: Ahmad Yakob
- Succeeded by: Mohamed Farid Mohamed Zawawi
- Constituency: Bukit Panau

Member of the Kelantan State Executive Council
- In office 2013–2018
- Monarch: Muhammad V
- Menteri Besar: Ahmad Yakob
- Portfolio: Local Government, Housing, Health and Environment
- Preceded by: Takiyuddin Hassan (Local Government); Md Anizam Ab Rahman (Housing, Environment); Wan Ubaidah Omar (Health)
- Succeeded by: Izani Husin (Local Government and Housing, Health); Tuan Saripuddin Tuan Ismail (Environment)
- Constituency: Bukit Panau
- In office 2008–2013
- Monarchs: Ismail Petra (2008–2010); Muhammad V (2010–2013)
- Menteri Besar: Nik Abdul Aziz Nik Mat
- Portfolio: Human Development, Youth, Sports and Non-governmental Organisations
- Preceded by: Himself (Youth and Sports)
- Succeeded by: Mohamed Fadzli Hassan (Human Development); Ramli Mamat (Youth Development, Sports &Non-governmental Organisations)
- Constituency: Bukit Panau
- In office 2004–2008
- Monarch: Ismail Petra
- Menteri Besar: Nik Abdul Aziz Nik Mat
- Portfolio: Women Development, Youth and Sports
- Preceded by: Muhammad Daud Iraqi (Women's Affairs); Hassan Muhamad (Youth and Sports)
- Succeeded by: Wan Ubaidah Omar (Women Development); Himself (Youth and Sports)
- Constituency: Bukit Panau

Member of the Kelantan State Legislative Assembly for Bukit Panau
- Incumbent
- Assumed office 21 March 2004
- Preceded by: Mat Yusof Mat Sah (PAS)
- Majority: 426 (2004); 4,183 (2008); 3,740 (2013); 4,291 (2018); 16,628 (2023)

Faction represented in Kelantan State Legislative Assembly
- 2004–2020: Malaysian Islamic Party
- 2020–: Perikatan Nasional

Personal details
- Born: Abdul Fattah Mahmood; 16 September 1963 (age 62) Kampung Domis, Tanah Merah, Kelantan, Malaysia
- Citizenship: Malaysian
- Party: Malaysian Islamic Party (PAS)
- Other political affiliations: Perikatan Nasional (PN); Muafakat Nasional (MN); Gagasan Sejahtera (GS); Pakatan Rakyat (PR); Barisan Alternatif (BA)
- Spouse: Fahimah Mahmood
- Children: 3
- Education: Universiti Kebangsaan Malaysia
- Occupation: Politician

Abdul Fattah bin Mahmood is a Malaysian politician who has served as Member of the Kelantan State Legislative Assembly (MLA) for Bukit Panau since March 2004. He is a member of the Malaysian Islamic Party (PAS), a component party of the Perikatan Nasional (PN) coalition.

== Election results ==
Kelantan State Legislative Assembly
Year	Constituency	Candidate	Votes	Pct	Opponent(s)	Votes	Pct	Ballots cast	Majority	Turnout
2004	N26 Bukit Panau	Abdul Fattah Mahmood (PAS)	6,926	51.59%	Baharudin Yusof (UMNO)	6,500	48.41%	13,861	426	81.45%
2008	N26 Bukit Panau	Abdul Fattah Mahmood (PAS)	10,129	63.01%	Nik Kemaruzaman Sulong (UMNO)	5,946	36.99%	16,337	4,183	79.92%
2013	N26 Bukit Panau	Abdul Fattah Mahmood (PAS)	13,292	58.19%	Baharudin Yusof (UMNO)	9,552	41.81%	23,103	3,740	84.60%
2018	N26 Bukit Panau	Abdul Fattah Mahmood (PAS)	14,506	52.40%	Dayang Saniah Awang Hamid (UMNO)	10,215	36.90%	28,171	4,291	80.90%
2018	N26 Bukit Panau	Abdul Fattah Mahmood (PAS)	14,506	52.40%	Hisham Fauzi (AMANAH)	2,963	10.70%	28,171	4,291	80.90%
2023	N26 Bukit Panau	Abdul Fattah Mahmood (PAS)	22,582	79.14%	Samsul Adabi Mamat (AMANAH)	5,954	20.86%	28,704	16,628	57.29%

== Honours ==
- Kelantan
  - Knight Commander of the Order of the Life of the Crown of Kelantan (DJMK) – Dato' (2011)
