= Meranti (state constituency) =

State constituency in Kelantan, Malaysia

Meranti (N13)
Kelantan constituency

State constituency
- Legislature: Kelantan State Legislative Assembly
MLA
Mohd. Nassuruddin Daud
PN
- Constituency created: 1959
- First contested: 1959
- Last contested: 2023

Demographics
- Electors (2023): 29,980

Meranti is a state constituency in Kelantan, Malaysia, that has been represented in the Kelantan State Legislative Assembly.

The state constituency was first contested in 1959 and is mandated to return a single Assemblyman to the Kelantan State Legislative Assembly under the first-past-the-post voting system.

== Demographics ==
As of 2020, Meranti has a population of 34,234 people.

Ethnic breakdown of Meranti's electorate as of 2023
1. Malay (99.0%)
2. Other ethnicities (0.91%)
3. Chinese (0.11%)
4. Indian (0.03%)

== History ==
=== Polling districts ===
According to the Gazette issued on 30 March 2018, the Meranti constituency has a total of 12 polling districts.

Polling Districts	Polling Districts	Code	Location
Meranti（N13）	Banggol Chicha	022/13/01	SK Banggol Chicha
Meranti（N13）	Meranti	022/13/02	SK Meranti
Meranti（N13）	Bakong	022/13/03	SK Bakong
Meranti（N13）	Meranti Kechil	022/13/04	SMK Meranti
Meranti（N13）	Pohon Buloh	022/13/05	SMU (A) Ismailiah Binjai Manis
Meranti（N13）	Kampung Lalang	022/13/06	SK Bayu Lalang
Meranti（N13）	Pohon Tanjong	022/13/07	SK Kedai Tanjong
Meranti（N13）	Kampung Siram	022/13/08	SMU (A) Al-Falah Siram
Meranti（N13）	Jejawi	022/13/09	SMU (A) Diniah
Meranti（N13）	Banggol Setol	022/13/10	SMU (A) Rahmaniah Repek
Meranti（N13）	Tok Sangkut	022/13/11	SK Tok Sangkut
Meranti（N13）	Tasek Berangan	022/13/12	SMU (A) Rahmaniah Repek

=== Representation history ===
Members of the Legislative Assembly for Meranti
Assembly	No	Years	Member	Party
Constituency created
1st	N07	1959–1964	Nik Man Nik Mohamed	PMIP
2nd	N07	1964–1969	Nik Man Nik Mohamed	PMIP
		1969–1971	Assembly was dissolved	
3rd	N07	1971–1974	Nik Man Nik Mohamed	PMIP
3rd	N07	1973-1974	Nik Man Nik Mohamed	BN (PMIP)
4th	N08	1974–1978	Nik Man Nik Mohamed	BN (PAS)
5th	N08	1978–1982	Hanifa Ahmad	BERJASA
6th	N08	1982–1986	Nik Man Nik Mohamed	PAS
7th	N12	1986–1989	Zaid Fadzil	BN (HAMIM)
7th	N12	1989–1990	Zaid Fadzil	BN (UMNO)
8th	N12	1990–1995	Zakaria Ismail	PAS
9th	N13	1995–1999	Mohd Nassuruddin Daud	PAS
10th	N13	1999–2004	Mohd Nassuruddin Daud	PAS
11th	N14	2004–2008	Mohd Nassuruddin Daud	PAS
12th	N14	2008–2013	Mohd Nassuruddin Daud	PR (PAS)
13th	N14	2013–2018	Mohd Nassuruddin Daud	PR (PAS)
14th	N13	2018–2020	Mohd Nassuruddin Daud	PAS
14th	N13	2020–2023	Mohd Nassuruddin Daud	PN (PAS)
15th	N13	2023–present	Mohd Nassuruddin Daud	PN (PAS)

== Election results ==
Kelantan state election, 2023
Party	Candidate	Votes	%	∆%
PAS	Mohd. Nassuruddin Daud	13,260	76.36	▲11.95
BN	Zahari Omar	4,106	23.64	▼2.69
Total valid votes		17,366	100.00	
Total rejected ballots		123		
Unreturned ballots		39		
Turnout		17,528	58.47	▼18.19
Registered electors		29,980		
Majority		9,154	52.72	▲14.64
PAS hold		Swing		

Kelantan state election, 2018
Party	Candidate	Votes	%	∆%
PAS	Mohd. Nassuruddin Daud	10,318	64.41	▼0.59
BN	Ahmad Anuar Hussin	4,218	26.33	▼8.67
PKR	Mohd Romizu Mohd Ali	971	6.06	▲6.06
Independent	Che Daud Che Man	512	3.20	▲3.20
Total valid votes		16,019	100.00	
Total rejected ballots		318		
Unreturned ballots		145		
Turnout		16,482	76.66	▼4.12
Registered electors		21,499		
Majority		6,100	38.08	▲8.08
PAS hold		Swing		

Kelantan state election, 2013
Party	Candidate	Votes	%	∆%
PAS	Mohd. Nassuruddin Daud	8,522	65.00	▲1.18
BN	Mohd Afandi Yusoff	4,589	35.00	▼1.18
Total valid votes		13,111	100.00	
Total rejected ballots		194		
Unreturned ballots		47		
Turnout		13,352	80.78	▲1.59
Registered electors		16,528		
Majority		3,933	30.00	▲2.36
PAS hold		Swing		

Kelantan state election, 2008
Party	Candidate	Votes	%	∆%
PAS	Mohd. Nassuruddin Daud	7,237	63.82	▲3.39
BN	Mohd Afandi Yusoff	4,102	36.18	▼3.39
Total valid votes		11,339	100.00	
Total rejected ballots		145		
Unreturned ballots		25		
Turnout		11,509	79.19	▲4.17
Registered electors		14,534		
Majority		3,135	27.64	▲6.78
PAS hold		Swing		

Kelantan state election, 2004
Party	Candidate	Votes	%	∆%
PAS	Mohd. Nassuruddin Daud	6,095	60.44	▼6.43
BN	Ab Halim Che Man	3,990	39.56	▲6.43
Total valid votes		10,085	100.00	
Total rejected ballots		163		
Unreturned ballots		25		
Turnout		10,273	75.01	▲1.85
Registered electors		13,695		
Majority		2,105	20.87	▼12.86
PAS hold		Swing		

Kelantan state election, 1999
Party	Candidate	Votes	%	∆%
PAS	Mohd. Nassuruddin Daud	5,983	66.86	▲3.96
BN	Zaid Fadzil	2,965	33.14	▼3.96
Total valid votes		8,948	100.00	
Total rejected ballots		207		
Unreturned ballots		5		
Turnout		9,160	73.16	▲3.49
Registered electors		12,520		
Majority		3,018	33.73	▲7.92
PAS hold		Swing		

Kelantan state election, 1995
Party	Candidate	Votes	%	∆%
PAS	Mohd. Nassuruddin Daud	5,060	62.90	▼4.83
BN	Mohamed Yaacob	2,984	37.10	▲4.83
Total valid votes		8,044	100.00	
Total rejected ballots		161		
Unreturned ballots		30		
Turnout		8,235	69.68	▼6.69
Registered electors		11,819		
Majority		2,076	25.81	▼9.66
PAS hold		Swing		

Kelantan state election, 1990
Party	Candidate	Votes	%	∆%
PAS	Zakaria Ismail	6,736	67.73	▲18.70
BN	Razali Ismail	3,209	32.27	▼18.70
Total valid votes		9,945	100.00	
Total rejected ballots		316		
Unreturned ballots		0		
Turnout		10,261	76.37	▲1.83
Registered electors		13,436		
Majority		3,527	35.47	▲33.53
PAS gain from BN		Swing		-

Kelantan state election, 1986
Party	Candidate	Votes	%	∆%
BN	Zaid Fadzil	4,558	50.97	▲12.31
PAS	Mohamed Noor Awang	4,385	49.03	▼12.31
Total valid votes		8,943	100.00	
Total rejected ballots		369		
Unreturned ballots		0		
Turnout		9,312	74.54	▼4.31
Registered electors		12,492		
Majority		173	1.93	▼20.75
BN gain from PAS		Swing		-

Kelantan state election, 1982
Party	Candidate	Votes	%	∆%
PAS	Nik Man Nik Mohamed	5,237	61.34	▲18.47
BN	Hanifa Ahmad	3,300	38.66	▲38.66
Total valid votes		8,537	100.00	
Total rejected ballots		164		
Unreturned ballots		0		
Turnout		8,701	78.85	▲5.74
Registered electors		11,035		
Majority		1,937	22.69	▲8.43
PAS gain from Pan-Malaysian Islamic Front		Swing		-

Kelantan state election, 1978
Party	Candidate	Votes	%	∆%
Pan-Malaysian Islamic Front	Hanifa Ahmad	3,802	57.13	▲57.13
PAS	Zaid Fadzil	2,853	42.87	▼34.30
Total valid votes		6,655	100.00	
Total rejected ballots		105		
Unreturned ballots		0		
Turnout		6,760	73.10	▲5.26
Registered electors		9,247		
Majority		949	14.26	▼40.08
Pan-Malaysian Islamic Front gain from BN		Swing		-

Kelantan state election, 1974
Party	Candidate	Votes	%	∆%
BN	Nik Man Nik Mohamed	4,448	77.17	▼6.61
Independent	Hanifa Ahmad	1,316	22.83	▲22.83
Total valid votes		5,764	100.00	
Total rejected ballots		430		
Unreturned ballots		0		
Turnout		6,194	67.84	▲0.48
Registered electors		9,130		
Majority		3,132	54.34	▼13.22
BN gain from PMIP		Swing		-

Kelantan state election, 1969
Party	Candidate	Votes	%	∆%
PMIP	Nik Man Nik Mohamed	4,556	83.78	▼8.55
Alliance	Mohd. Jantan Mohd. Amin	882	16.22	▲8.55
Total valid votes		5,438	100.00	
Total rejected ballots		249		
Unreturned ballots		0		
Turnout		5,687	67.36	▼8.30
Registered electors		8,443		
Majority		3,674	67.56	▼17.09
PMIP hold		Swing		

Kelantan state election, 1964
Party	Candidate	Votes	%	∆%
PMIP	Nik Man Nik Mohamed	5,198	92.33	▼1.29
Alliance	Wan Mohamad Zain Wan Sulaiman	432	7.67	▲1.29
Total valid votes		5,630	100.00	
Total rejected ballots		124		
Unreturned ballots		0		
Turnout		5,754	75.66	▼1.97
Registered electors		7,605		
Majority		4,766	84.65	▼2.59
PMIP hold		Swing		

Kelantan state election, 1959
Party	Candidate	Votes	%
PMIP	Nik Man Nik Mohamed	4,989	93.62
Alliance	Yusof Mat Akib	340	6.38
Total valid votes		5,329	100.00
Total rejected ballots		34	
Unreturned ballots		0	
Turnout		5,363	77.63
Registered electors		6,908	
Majority		4,649	87.24
This was a new constituency created.
