= Bukit Panau =

Constituency in Kelantan, Malaysia

Bukit Panau (N26)
Kelantan constituency

State constituency
- Legislature: Kelantan State Legislative Assembly
MLA
Abdul Fattah Mahmood
PN
- Constituency created: 1974
- First contested: 1974
- Last contested: 2023

Demographics
- Electors (2023): 50,237

Bukit Panau is a state constituency in Kelantan, Malaysia, that has been represented in the Kelantan State Legislative Assembly.

The state constituency was first contested in 1974 and is mandated to return a single Assemblyman to the Kelantan State Legislative Assembly under the first-past-the-post voting system.

== Demographics ==
As of 2020, Bukit Panau has a population of 68,462 people.

Ethnic breakdown of Bukit Panau's electorate as of 2023
1. Malay (90.9%)
2. Chinese (7.57%)
3. Other ethnicities (1.41%)
4. Indian (0.16%)

== History ==
=== Polling districts ===
According to the Gazette issued on 30 March 2018, the Bukit Panau constituency has a total of 13 polling districts.

State Constituency	Polling Districts	Code	Location
Bukit Panau (N26）	Bukit Panau	027/26/01	SK Bukit Panau
Bukit Panau (N26）	Kampung Paloh	027/26/02	SMU (A) Rahmaniah Paloh
Bukit Panau (N26）	Kampung Belimbing	027/26/03	SK Belimbing
Bukit Panau (N26）	Padang Siam	027/26/04	Maahad Ahmadi Tanah Merah
Bukit Panau (N26）	Kelewek	027/26/05	SK Sri Kelewek
Bukit Panau (N26）	Kampung Sat	027/26/06	SJK (C) Yuk Cheng
Bukit Panau (N26）	Banggol	027/26/07	SMK Dato' Mahmud Paduka Raja (1)
Bukit Panau (N26）	Pondok	027/26/08	SK Sri Suria (1)
Bukit Panau (N26）	Tanah Merah Pekan	027/26/09	SK Tanah Merah (1)
Bukit Panau (N26）	Tepi Sungai	027/26/10	SMK Dato' Mahmud Paduka Raja (2)
Bukit Panau (N26）	Batu Hitam	027/26/11	SK Tanah Merah (2)
Bukit Panau (N26）	Banggol Kemunting	027/26/12	SK Sri Suria (3)
Bukit Panau (N26）	Manal	027/26/13	SMK Tanah Merah (2)

=== Representation history ===
Members of the Legislative Assembly for Bukit Panau
Assembly	No	Years	Member	Party
Constituency created Tanah Merah Timor
4th	N22	1974–1978	Omar Muhamed @ Mamat	BN (PAS)
5th	N22	1978–1982	Abdul Latif Abdul Rahman	BN (UMNO)
6th	N22	1982–1986	Abdul Latif Abdul Rahman	BN (UMNO)
7th	N28	1986–1990	Abdul Latif Abdul Rahman	BN (UMNO)
8th	N28	1990–1995	Mat Yusof Mat Sah	PAS
9th	N26	1995–1999	Mat Yusof Mat Sah	PAS
10th	N26	1999–2004	Mat Yusof Mat Sah	PAS
11th	N26	2004–2008	Abdul Fattah Mahmood	PAS
12th	N26	2008–2013	Abdul Fattah Mahmood	PR (PAS)
13th	N26	2013–2018	Abdul Fattah Mahmood	PR (PAS)
14th	N26	2018–2020	Abdul Fattah Mahmood	PAS
14th	N26	2020–2023	Abdul Fattah Mahmood	PN (PAS)
15th	N26	2023–present	Abdul Fattah Mahmood	PN (PAS)

== Election results ==
Kelantan state election, 2023: Bukit Panau
Party	Candidate	Votes	%	∆%
PAS	Abdul Fattah Mahmood	22,582	79.14	▲26.74
PH	Samsu Adabi Mamat	5,954	20.86	▲20.86
Total valid votes		28,536	100.00	
Total rejected ballots		168		
Unreturned ballots		76		
Turnout		28,780	57.29	▼23.59
Registered electors		50,237		
Majority		16,628	58.28	▲42.78
PAS hold		Swing		

Kelantan state election, 2018: Bukit Panau
Party	Candidate	Votes	%	∆%
PAS	Abdul Fattah Mahmood	14,506	52.40	▼5.79
BN	Dayang Saniah Awang Hamid	10,215	36.90	▼4.91
PKR	Hisham Fauzi	2,963	10.70	▲10.70
Total valid votes		27,684	100.00	
Total rejected ballots		487		
Unreturned ballots		245		
Turnout		28,416	80.88	▼3.72
Registered electors		35,135		
Majority		4,291	15.50	▼0.88
PAS hold		Swing		

Kelantan state election, 2013: Bukit Panau
Party	Candidate	Votes	%	∆%
PAS	Abdul Fattah Mahmood	13,292	58.19	▼4.82
BN	Baharudin Yusof	9,552	41.81	▲4.82
Total valid votes		22,844	100.00	
Total rejected ballots		259		
Unreturned ballots		82		
Turnout		23,185	84.60	▲4.68
Registered electors		27,405		
Majority		3,740	16.37	▼9.65
PAS hold		Swing		

Kelantan state election, 2008: Bukit Panau
Party	Candidate	Votes	%	∆%
PAS	Abdul Fattah Mahmood	10,129	63.01	▲11.42
BN	Nik Kemaruzaman bin Sulong	5,946	36.99	▼11.42
Total valid votes		16,075	100.00	
Total rejected ballots		180		
Unreturned ballots		82		
Turnout		16,337	79.92	▼1.53
Registered electors		20,442		
Majority		4,183	26.02	▲22.85
PAS hold		Swing		

Kelantan state election, 2004: Bukit Panau
Party	Candidate	Votes	%	∆%
PAS	Abdul Fattah Mahmood	6,926	51.59	▼9.58
BN	Baharudin Yusof	6,500	48.41	▲9.58
Total valid votes		13,426	100.00	
Total rejected ballots		184		
Unreturned ballots		251		
Turnout		13,861	81.45	▲3.18
Registered electors		17,018		
Majority		426	3.17	▼19.15
PAS hold		Swing		

Kelantan state election, 1999: Bukit Panau
Party	Candidate	Votes	%	∆%
PAS	Mat Yusoff Mat Sah	8,041	61.16	▲7.10
BN	Muhamat Sulaima	5,106	38.84	▼7.10
Total valid votes		13,147	100.00	
Total rejected ballots		195		
Unreturned ballots		31		
Turnout		13,373	78.27	▲1.37
Registered electors		17,086		
Majority		2,935	22.32	▲14.21
PAS hold		Swing		

Kelantan state election, 1995: Bukit Panau
Party	Candidate	Votes	%	∆%
PAS	Mat Yusoff Mat Sah	6,420	54.06	▼8.61
BN	Mohamad Suparadi Md. Noor	5,456	45.94	▲9.85
Total valid votes		11,876	100.00	
Total rejected ballots		221		
Unreturned ballots		43		
Turnout		12,140	76.90	▼5.15
Registered electors		15,787		
Majority		964	8.12	▼18.46
PAS hold		Swing		

Kelantan state election, 1990: Bukit Panau
Party	Candidate	Votes	%	∆%
PAS	Mat Yusoff Mat Sah	7,504	62.67	▲18.33
BN	Ab Latif Ab Rahman	4,322	36.09	▼19.57
Independent	Hanafi Hamat	148	1.24	▲1.24
Total valid votes		11,974	100.00	
Total rejected ballots		357		
Unreturned ballots		1		
Turnout		12,332	82.04	▲4.23
Registered electors		15,031		
Majority		3,182	26.57	▲15.25
PAS gain from BN		Swing		-

Kelantan state election, 1986: Bukit Panau
Party	Candidate	Votes	%	∆%
BN	Ab Latif Ab Rahman	5,504	55.66	▲2.26
PAS	Mat Yusoff Mat Sah	4,384	44.34	▼2.26
Total valid votes		9,888	100.00	
Total rejected ballots		327		
Unreturned ballots		0		
Turnout		10,215	77.82	▼4.83
Registered electors		13,127		
Majority		1,120	11.33	▲4.53
BN hold		Swing		

Kelantan state election, 1982: Bukit Panau
Party	Candidate	Votes	%	∆%
BN	Ab Latif Ab Rahman	5,064	53.40	▼3.91
PAS	Wan Mamat Wan Yusoff	4,419	46.60	▲12.02
Total valid votes		9,483	100.00	
Total rejected ballots		128		
Unreturned ballots		0		
Turnout		9,611	82.65	▲5.26
Registered electors		11,629		
Majority		645	6.80	▼15.93
BN hold		Swing		

Kelantan state election, 1978: Bukit Panau
Party	Candidate	Votes	%	∆%
BN	Ab Latif Ab Rahman	3,936	57.31	▲57.31
PAS	Abdul Halim Abdul Rahman	2,375	34.58	▼47.80
Pan-Malaysian Islamic Front	Shahidin Abd Rahman	557	8.11	▲8.11
Total valid votes		6,868	100.00	
Total rejected ballots		29		
Unreturned ballots		0		
Turnout		6,897	77.39	▲1.00
Registered electors		8,912		
Majority		1,561	22.73	▼52.32
BN hold		Swing		

Kelantan state election, 1974: Bukit Panau
Party	Candidate	Votes	%
BN	Che Omar Muhamad	4,969	82.38
Independent	Yusoff Abdul Latiff	442	7.33
Parti Rakyat Malaysia	Hussin	432	7.16
Independent	Shahidin Abd Rahman	189	3.13
Total valid votes		6,032	100.00
Total rejected ballots		112	
Unreturned ballots		0	
Turnout		6,144	76.39
Registered electors		8,043	
Majority		4,527	75.05
This was a new constituency created.
