= Kemahang =

State constituency in Kelantan, Malaysia

Kemahang (N28)
Kelantan constituency

State constituency
- Legislature: Kelantan State Legislative Assembly
MLA
Md. Anizam Ab. Rahman
PN
- Constituency created: 1995
- First contested: 1995
- Last contested: 2023

Demographics
- Electors (2023): 23,258

Kemahang is a state constituency in Kelantan, Malaysia, that has been represented in the Kelantan State Legislative Assembly.

The state constituency was first contested in 1995 and is mandated to return a single Assemblyman to the Kelantan State Legislative Assembly under the first-past-the-post voting system.

== Demographics ==
As of 2020, Kemahang has a population of 27,677 people.

Ethnic breakdown of Kemahang's electorate as of 2023
1. Malay (98.6%)
2. Other ethnicities (1.06%)
3. Chinese (0.22%)
4. Indian (0.09%)

== History ==
=== Polling districts ===
According to the Gazette issued on 30 March 2018, the Kemahang constituency has a total of 7 polling districts.

State Constituency	Polling Districts	Code	Location
Kemahang (N28）	FELDA Kemahang 1	027/28/01	SMK Kemahang
Kemahang (N28）	FELDA Kemahang 3	027/28/02	SK Kemahang 3
Kemahang (N28）	FELDA Kemahang 2	027/28/03	SK Kemahang (2)
Kemahang (N28）	Bukit Mas	027/28/04	SMK Alor Pasir
Kemahang (N28）	Bukit Gading	027/28/05	SK Bukit Gading
Kemahang (N28）	Bendang Nyior	027/28/06	SK Bendang Nyior
Kemahang (N28）	Batang Merbau	027/28/07	SK Batang Merbau

=== Representation history ===
Members of the Legislative Assembly for Kemahang
Assembly	No	Years	Member	Party
Constituency created from Bukit Panau
9th	N35	1995–1999	Mohd Adnan Kechik	BN (UMNO)
10th	N35	1999–2004	Md. Anizam Ab. Rahman	PAS
11th	N28	2004–2008	Md. Anizam Ab. Rahman	PAS
12th	N28	2008–2013	Md. Anizam Ab. Rahman	PR (PAS)
13th	N28	2013–2018	Md. Anizam Ab. Rahman	PR (PAS)
14th	N28	2018–2020	Md. Anizam Ab. Rahman	PAS
14th	N28	2020–2023	Md. Anizam Ab. Rahman	PN (PAS)
15th	N28	2023–present	Md. Anizam Ab. Rahman	PN (PAS)

== Election results ==
Kelantan state election, 2023: Kemahang
Party	Candidate	Votes	%	∆%
PAS	Md. Anizam Ab. Rahman	10,375	77.20	▲26.55
BN	Mazli Mustafa	3,064	22.80	▼21.41
Total valid votes		13,439	100.00	
Total rejected ballots		84		
Unreturned ballots		12		
Turnout		13,535	58.20	▼23.42
Registered electors		23,258		
Majority		7,311	54.40	▲47.96
PAS hold		Swing		

Kelantan state election, 2018: Kemahang
Party	Candidate	Votes	%	∆%
PAS	Md. Anizam Ab. Rahman	7,261	50.65	▼5.11
BN	Wan Rakemi Wan Zahari	6,338	44.21	▼0.03
PKR	Bahari Muhammad Nor	737	5.14	▲5.14
Total valid votes		14,336	100.00	
Total rejected ballots		206		
Unreturned ballots		140		
Turnout		14,682	81.62	▼6.09
Registered electors		17,989		
Majority		923	6.44	▼5.08
PAS hold		Swing		

Kelantan state election, 2013: Kemahang
Party	Candidate	Votes	%	∆%
PAS	Md. Anizam Ab. Rahman	6,953	55.76	▼4.94
BN	Dyg. Saniah Awg. Hamid	5,517	44.24	▲4.94
Total valid votes		12,470	100.00	
Total rejected ballots		138		
Unreturned ballots		30		
Turnout		12,638	87.71	▲4.16
Registered electors		14,409		
Majority		1,436	11.52	▼9.88
PAS hold		Swing		

Kelantan state election, 2008: Kemahang
Party	Candidate	Votes	%	∆%
PAS	Md. Anizam Ab. Rahman	5,481	60.70	▲8.34
BN	Zianon Abdin bin Ali	3,549	39.30	▼8.34
Total valid votes		9,030	100.00	
Total rejected ballots		103		
Unreturned ballots		16		
Turnout		9,149	83.55	▼0.02
Registered electors		10,950		
Majority		1,932	21.40	▲16.67
PAS hold		Swing		

Kelantan state election, 2004: Kemahang
Party	Candidate	Votes	%	∆%
PAS	Md. Anizam Ab. Rahman	3,901	52.36	▼0.28
BN	Shuhanie Deraman	3,549	47.64	▲0.28
Total valid votes		7,450	100.00	
Total rejected ballots		90		
Unreturned ballots		52		
Turnout		7,592	83.58	▼0.45
Registered electors		9,084		
Majority		352	4.72	▼0.56
PAS hold		Swing		

Kelantan state election, 1999: Kemahang
Party	Candidate	Votes	%	∆%
PAS	Md. Anizam Ab. Rahman	6,251	52.64	▲52.64
BN	Mohd Adhan Kechik	5,623	47.36	▼4.51
Total valid votes		11,874	100.00	
Total rejected ballots		377		
Unreturned ballots		139		
Turnout		12,390	84.02	▲0.86
Registered electors		14,746		
Majority		628	5.29	▲1.56
PAS gain from BN		Swing		-

Kelantan state election, 1995: Kemahang
Party	Candidate	Votes	%
BN	Mohd Adhan Kechik	5,421	51.87
PAS	Nik Kemaruzaman Sulong	5,031	48.13
Total valid votes		10,452	100.00
Total rejected ballots		228	
Unreturned ballots		100	
Turnout		10,780	83.16
Registered electors		12,963	
Majority		390	3.73
This was a new constituency created.
