= Mohd Nassuruddin Daud =

Malaysian politician and religious scholar

Yang Amat Berhormat Dato' Panglima Perang Ustaz Dato' Mohd Nassuruddin Daud SJMK DJMK JMK MLA
- محمد ناصر الدين داود
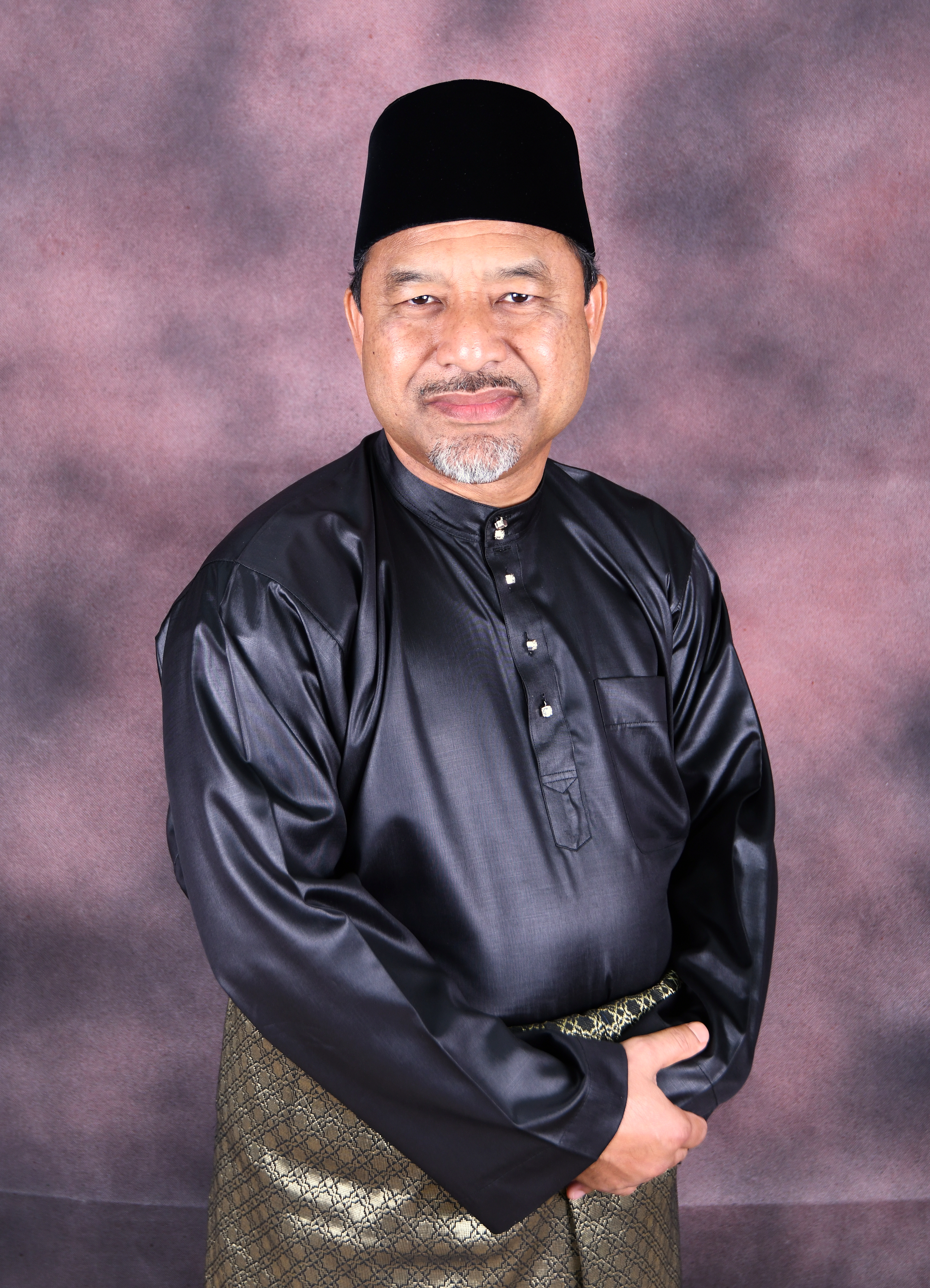
- Official photo 2025

Menteri Besar of Kelantan
- Incumbent
- Assumed office 15 August 2023
- Monarch: Muhammad V
- Preceded by: Ahmad Yakob
- Constituency: Meranti

Member of the Kelantan State Executive Council (Islamic Development, Dakwah, Information & Public Relations)
- In office 8 May 2013 – 15 August 2023
- Monarch: Muhammad V
- 19th Menteri Besar: Ahmad Yakob
- Deputy: Yusnan Yusof (2018–2021)
- Preceded by: Mohd Amar Abdullah (Islamic Development & Dakwah); Mohamed Fadzli Hassan (Information & Public Relations)
- Succeeded by: Mohd Asri Mat Daud
- Constituency: Meranti

Speaker of the Kelantan State Legislative Assembly
- In office 28 April 2008 – 12 June 2013
- Monarchs: Ismail Petra (2008–2010); Muhammad V (2010–2013)
- Deputy: Mohamad Zaki Ibrahim
- Menteri Besar: Nik Abdul Aziz Nik Mat
- Preceded by: Wan Abdul Rahim Wan Abdullah
- Succeeded by: Abdullah Ya'kub
- Constituency: Meranti

Member of the Kelantan State Legislative Assembly for Meranti
- Incumbent
- Assumed office 25 April 1995
- Preceded by: Zakaria Ismail (PAS)
- Majority: 2,076 (1995); 3,018 (1999); 2,105 (2004); 3,135 (2008); 3,933 (2013); 6,100 (2018); 9,154 (2023)

Faction represented in Kelantan State Legislative Assembly
- 1995–2020: Malaysian Islamic Party
- 2020–: Perikatan Nasional

Personal details
- Born: Mohd Nassuruddin bin Daud; 4 October 1965 (age 61) Pasir Mas, Kelantan, Malaysia
- Citizenship: Malaysian
- Party: Malaysian Islamic Party (PAS)
- Other political affiliations: Angkatan Perpaduan Ummah (APU) (1990–1996); Barisan Alternatif (BA) (1999–2004); Pakatan Rakyat (PR) (2008–2015); Gagasan Sejahtera (GS) (2015–2020); Perikatan Nasional (PN) (since 2020)
- Spouse: Wan Nor Hanita Wan Yaakob
- Children: 10
- Education: Al-Azhar University
- Occupation: Politician
- Profession: Religious scholar

Mohd Nassuruddin bin Daud (born 4 October 1965) is a Malaysian politician and religious scholar who has served as the Menteri Besar of Kelantan since August 2023 and Member of the Kelantan State Legislative Assembly (MLA) for Meranti since April 1995. He served as Member of the Kelantan State Executive Council (EXCO) in the Pakatan Rakyat (PR), Gagasan Sejahtera (GS) and Perikatan Nasional (PN) state administrations under former Menteri Besar Ahmad Yakob from May 2013 to his promotion to the Menteri Besarship in August 2023 as well as Speaker of the Kelantan State Legislative Assembly from April 2008 to June 2013. He is a member and State Information Chief of Kelantan of the Malaysian Islamic Party (PAS), a component party of the PN and formerly GS, PR, Barisan Alternatif (BA) and Angkatan Perpaduan Ummah (APU) coalitions.

== Personal life ==
At night on 26 December 2023, the house of Mohd Nassuruddin and the surrounding area of Kampung Meranti were flooded as the floods in Kelantan worsened.

== Election results ==
Kelantan State Legislative Assembly
Year	Constituency	Candidate	Votes	Pct	Opponent(s)	Votes	Pct	Ballots cast	Majority	Turnout
1995	N13 Meranti	Mohd Nassuruddin Daud (PAS)	5,060	62.90%	Mohamed Ya'acob (UMNO)	2,984	37.10%	8,235	2,076	69.68%
1999	N13 Meranti	Mohd Nassuruddin Daud (PAS)	5,983	66.86%	Zaid Fadzil (UMNO)	2,965	33.14%	9,160	3,018	73.16%
2004	N14 Meranti	Mohd Nassuruddin Daud (PAS)	6,095	60.44%	Ab Halim Che Man (UMNO)	3,990	39.56%	10,273	2,105	75.01%
2008	N14 Meranti	Mohd Nassuruddin Daud (PAS)	7,237	63.82%	Abdullah Mat Yasim (UMNO)	4,102	36.18%	11,509	3,135	79.19%
2013	N14 Meranti	Mohd Nassuruddin Daud (PAS)	8,522	65.00%	Mohd Afandi Yusoff (UMNO)	4,589	35.00%	13,305	3,933	80.80%
2018	N13 Meranti	Mohd Nassuruddin Daud (PAS)	10,318	64.41%	Ahmad Anuar Hussin (UMNO)	4,218	26.33%	16,482	6,100	76.70%
2018	N13 Meranti	Mohd Nassuruddin Daud (PAS)	10,318	64.41%	Mohd Romizu Mohd Ali (AMANAH)	971	6.06%	16,482	6,100	76.70%
2018	N13 Meranti	Mohd Nassuruddin Daud (PAS)	10,318	64.41%	Che Daud Che Man (IND)	512	3.20%	16,482	6,100	76.70%
2023	N13 Meranti	Mohd Nassuruddin Daud (PAS)	13,260	76.36%	Zahri Omar (UMNO)	4,106	23.64%	17,366	9,154	57.93%

== Honours ==
- Kelantan
  - Companion of the Order of the Life of the Crown of Kelantan (JMK) (2007)
  - Knight Commander of the Order of the Life of the Crown of Kelantan (DJMK) – Dato' (2010)
  - Knight Grand Commander of the Order of the Life of the Crown of Kelantan (SJMK) – Dato' (2019)
  - Dato' Panglima Perang (2019)
