= Next Kelantan state election =

General election for the 16th Kelantan State Legislative Assembly

- On or before 4 November 2028

All 45 seats in the Legislative Assembly 23 seats needed for a majority
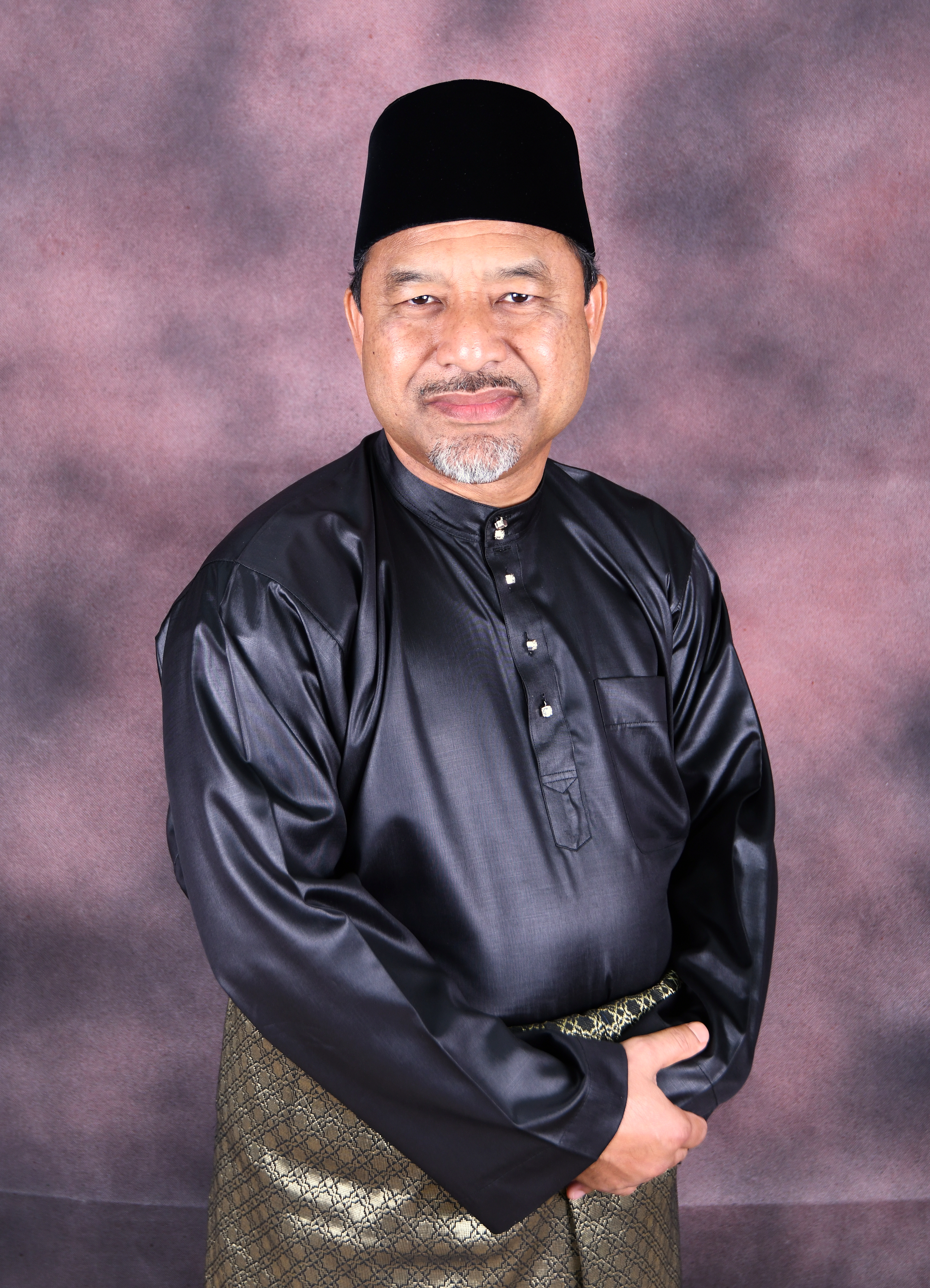

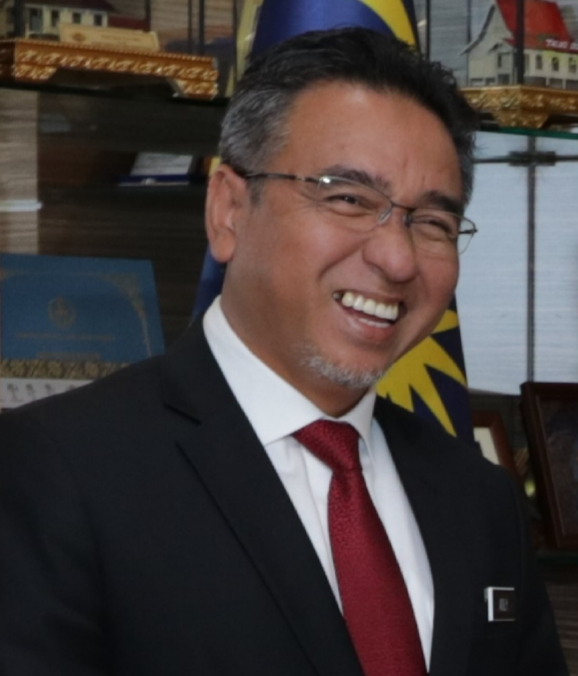
		BN
Leader	Mohd Nassuruddin Daud	Ahmad Jazlan Yaakub	Adly Zahari
Party	Malaysian Islamic Party	United Malays National Organisation	National Trust Party (Malaysia)
Alliance	Perikatan Nasional	Barisan Nasional	Pakatan Harapan
Leader since	15 August 2023	18 January 2023	5 November 2024
Leader's seat	Meranti	Not Contested	Not Contested
Last election	43 seats, 69.24%	2 seats, 20.95%	1 seat, 9.57%
Current seats	42	2	1
Seats needed	Steady	▲21	▲22
Incumbent Menteri Besar of Kelantan
Mohd Nassuruddin Daud
Perikatan Nasional-Malaysian Islamic Party

The next Kelantan state election, will elect members of the 16th Kelantan State Legislative Assembly. It must be held on or before 4 November 2028, pursuant to clause 46 (4) of the Constitution of Kelantan or unless dissolved earlier by the Sultan of Kelantan on the advice of the Menteri Besar of Kelantan.

All 45 seats in the Kelantan State Legislative Assembly will be contested. The election will determine whether the incumbent Perikatan Nasional government under Menteri Besar Aminuddin Harun retains power, or whether opposition coalitions such as Barisan Nasional or Pakatan Harapan can secure a majority.

== Constituencies ==
Electoral map of Kelantan, showing all 36 constituencies

== Composition before dissolution ==
PN		BN	PH
42		2	1
37	5	2	1
PAS	BERSATU	UMNO	AMANAH

== Background ==
=== Previous election ===
The previous state election was held on 12 August 2023 following the dissolution of the 15th State Legislative Assembly. Perikatan Nasional won a two-thirds supermajority, securing 43 of 45 seats.

== Electoral system ==
Elections in Malaysia are conducted at the federal and state levels. Federal elections elect members of the Dewan Rakyat, the lower house of Parliament, while state elections in each of the 13 states elect members of their respective state legislative assembly. As Malaysia follows the Westminster system of government, the head of government (Prime Minister at the federal level and the Menteri Besar/Chief Ministers/Premier at the state level) is the person who commands the confidence of the majority of members in the respective legislature – this is normally the leader of the party or coalition with the majority of seats in the legislature.

The Legislative Assembly currently consists of 45 members, known as Members of the Legislative Assembly (MLAs), that are elected for five-year terms. Each MLA is elected from a single-member constituencies using the first-past-the-post voting system; each constituency contains approximately an equal number of voters. If one party obtains a majority of seats, then that party is entitled to form the government, with its leader becoming the Premier. In the event of a hung parliament, where no single party obtains the majority of seats, the government may still form through a coalition or a confidence and supply agreement with other parties. In practice, coalitions and alliances in Malaysia, and by extension, in Sarawak, generally persist between elections, and member parties do not normally contest for the same seats.

The voting age is currently 18. Elections are conducted by the Election Commission of Malaysia, which is under the jurisdiction of the Prime Minister's Department. Malaysia practices automatic voter registration but does not practice compulsory voting.

== Preparations ==
=== Political parties ===
Perikatan Nasional is expected to defend its governing mandate, while Barisan Nasional aims to regain influence after losing control in 1999. Pakatan Harapan may also expand its challenge in Malay-majority constituencies.

Seat negotiations among opposition parties are expected to play a major role in determining electoral competitiveness.

== Departing incumbents ==
The following members of the 15th Kelantan State Legislative Assembly did not seek re-election.

No.	State Constituency	Departing MLA	Coalition (Party)	Date confirmed	First elected	Reason

== Candidates ==
Candidate announcements are expected closer to nomination day.

No.	Parliamentary constituency	No.	State Constituency	Number of Voters	Constituency Largest Ethnic	Incumbent Member	Incumbent Coalition (Party)	Political coalitions and respective candidates and coalitions									
No.	Parliamentary constituency	No.	State Constituency	Number of Voters	Constituency Largest Ethnic	Incumbent Member	Incumbent Coalition (Party)	Perikatan Nasional (PN)		Barisan Nasional (BN)		Pakatan Harapan (PH)		Others			
No.	Parliamentary constituency	No.	State Constituency	Number of Voters	Constituency Largest Ethnic	Incumbent Member	Incumbent Coalition (Party)	Candidate name	Party	Candidate name	Party	Candidate name	Party	Candidate name	Party	Candidate name	Party
P019	Tumpat	N01	Pengkalan Kubor		Malay	Wan Roslan Wan Hamat	PN (PAS)		PAS		UMNO		PKR				
P019	Tumpat	N02	Kelaboran		Malay	Mohd Adanan Hassan	PN (PAS)		PAS		UMNO		AMANAH				
P019	Tumpat	N03	Pasir Pekan		Malay	Ahmad Yakob	PN (PAS)		PAS		UMNO		PKR				
P019	Tumpat	N04	Wakaf Bharu		Malay	Mohd Rusli Abdullah	PN (PAS)		PAS		UMNO		AMANAH				
P020	Pengkalan Chepa	N05	Kijang		Malay	Izani Husin	PN (PAS)		PAS		UMNO		PKR				
P020	Pengkalan Chepa	N06	Chempaka		Malay	Nik Asma' Bahrum Nik Abdullah	PN (PAS)		PAS		UMNO		AMANAH				
P020	Pengkalan Chepa	N07	Panchor		Malay	Mohd. Amar Abdullah	PN (PAS)		PAS		UMNO		PKR				
P021	Kota Bharu	N08	Tanjong Mas		Malay	Rohani Ibrahim	PN (PAS)		PAS		UMNO		PKR				
P021	Kota Bharu	N09	Kota Lama		Malay	Hafidzah Mustakim	PH (AMANAH)		PAS		MCA		AMANAH				
P021	Kota Bharu	N10	Bunut Payong		Malay	Shaari Mat Yaman	PN (PAS)		PAS		UMNO		AMANAH				
P022	Pasir Mas	N11	Tendong		Malay	Rozi Muhamad	PN (PAS)		PAS		UMNO		PKR				
P022	Pasir Mas	N12	Pengkalan Pasir		Malay	Mohd Nasriff Daud	PN (PAS)		PAS		UMNO		AMANAH				
P022	Pasir Mas	N13	Meranti		Malay	Mohd Nassuruddin Daud	PN (PAS)		PAS		UMNO		AMANAH				
P023	Rantau Panjang	N14	Chetok		Malay	Zuraidin Abdullah	PN (PAS)		PAS		UMNO		PKR				
P023	Rantau Panjang	N15	Gual Periok		Malay	Kamaruzaman Mohamad	PN (PAS)		PAS		UMNO		AMANAH				
P023	Rantau Panjang	N16	Apam Putra		Malay	Zamakhshari Mohamad	PN (PAS)		PAS		UMNO		AMANAH				
P024	Kubang Kerian	N17	Salor		Malay	Saizol Ismail	PN (PAS)		PAS		UMNO		AMANAH				
P024	Kubang Kerian	N18	Pasir Tumboh		Malay	Abd Rahman Yunus	PN (PAS)		PAS		UMNO		PKR				
P024	Kubang Kerian	N19	Demit		Malay	Mohd Asri Mat Daud	PN (PAS)		PAS		UMNO		AMANAH				
P025	Bachok	N20	Tawang		Malay	Harun Ismail	PN (PAS)		PAS		UMNO		AMANAH				
P025	Bachok	N21	Pantai Irama		Malay	Mohd Huzaimy Che Husin	PN (PAS)		PAS		UMNO		AMANAH				
P025	Bachok	N22	Jelawat		Malay	Zameri Mat Nawang	PN (PAS)		PAS		UMNO		PKR				
P026	Ketereh	N23	Melor		Malay	Wan Rohimi Wan Daud	PN (PAS)		PAS		UMNO		PKR				
P026	Ketereh	N24	Kadok		Malay	Azami Md. Nor	PN (PAS)		PAS		UMNO		AMANAH				
P026	Ketereh	N25	Kok Lanas		Malay	Mohamed Farid Mohamed Zawawi	PN (WAWASAN)		WAWASAN		UMNO		AMANAH				
P027	Tanah Merah	N26	Bukit Panau		Malay	Abdul Fatah Mahmood	PN (PAS)		PAS		UMNO		AMANAH				
P027	Tanah Merah	N27	Gual Ipoh		Malay	Bahari Mohamad Nor	PN (BERSATU)		WAWASAN		UMNO		AMANAH				
P027	Tanah Merah	N28	Kemahang		Malay	Md. Anizam Ab. Rahman	PN (PAS)		PAS		UMNO		PKR				
P028	Pasir Puteh	N29	Selising		Malay	Tuan Mohd Saripuddin Tuan Ismail	PN (PAS)		PAS		UMNO		PKR				
P028	Pasir Puteh	N30	Limbongan		Malay	Nor Asilah Mohamed Zin	PN (PAS)		PAS		UMNO		PKR				
P028	Pasir Puteh	N31	Semerak		Malay	Nor Sham Sulaiman	PN (PAS)		PAS		UMNO		AMANAH				
P028	Pasir Puteh	N32	Gaal		Malay	Mohd Rodzi Ja'afar	PN (PAS)		PAS		UMNO		AMANAH				
P029	Machang	N33	Pulai Chondong		Malay	Azhar Salleh	PN (PAS)		PAS		UMNO		PKR				
P029	Machang	N34	Temangan		Malay	Mohamed Fadzli Hassan	PN (PAS)		PAS		UMNO		AMANAH				
P029	Machang	N35	Kemuning		Malay	Ahmad Zakhran Mat Noor	PN (PAS)		PAS		UMNO		AMANAH				
P030	Jeli	N36	Bukit Bunga		Malay	Mohd Almidi Jaafar	PN (BERSATU)		WAWASAN		UMNO		PKR				
P030	Jeli	N37	Air Lanas		Malay	Kamarudin Md Nor	PN (BERSATU)		WAWASAN		UMNO		AMANAH				
P030	Jeli	N38	Kuala Balah		Malay	Abdul Hadi Awang Kechil	PN (PAS)		PAS		UMNO		PKR				
P031	Kuala Krai	N39	Mengkebang		Malay	Zubir Abu Bakar	PN (PAS)		PAS		UMNO		PKR				
P031	Kuala Krai	N40	Guchil		Malay	Hilmi Abdullah	PN (PAS)		PAS		UMNO		PKR				
P031	Kuala Krai	N41	Manek Urai		Malay	Mohd Fauzi Abdullah	PN (PAS)		PAS		UMNO		AMANAH				
P031	Kuala Krai	N42	Dabong		Malay	Ku Mohd Zaki Ku Hussien	PN (PAS)		PAS		UMNO		AMANAH				
P032	Gua Musang	N43	Nenggiri		Malay	Mohd Azmawi Fikri Abdul Ghani	BN (UMNO)		WAWASAN		UMNO		PKR				
P032	Gua Musang	N44	Paloh		Malay	Shaari Mat Hussain	PN (BERSATU)		WAWASAN		UMNO		PKR				
P032	Gua Musang	N45	Galas		Malay	Mohd Syahbuddin Hashim	BN (UMNO)		PAS		UMNO		DAP				

== Opinion polls ==
Opinion polling has yet to intensify significantly ahead of the election.
