= Bukit Tuku (state constituency) =

Former state constituency in Kelantan, Malaysia

Cherang Ruku
Kelantan constituency

Defunct state constituency
- Legislature: Kelantan State Legislative Assembly
- Constituency created: 1984
- Constituency abolished: 2018
- First contested: 1986
- Last contested: 2013

Bukit Tuku is a former state constituency in Kelantan, Malaysia, that has been represented in the Kelantan State Legislative Assembly.

== History ==
=== Representation history ===
Members of the Legislative Assembly for Bukit Tuku
Assembly	No	Years	Member	Party
Constituency created from Tok Uban
7th	N14	1986-1987	Zakaria Botok	BN (UMNO)
7th	N14	1987-1990	Mohd Zain Ismail	BN (UMNO)
8th	N14	1990-1995	Hussin Ibrahim	PAS
9th	N15	1995-1999	Mohd Yusof Abdullah	PAS
10th	N15	1999–2004	Mohd Yusof Abdullah	PAS
11th	N16	2004-2008	Mohd Zain Ismail	BN (UMNO)
12th	N16	2008-2013	Abdul Fatah Harun	PAS
13th	N16	2013-2018	Abdul Rasul Mohamed	PAS
Constituency abolished, renamed to Apam Putra

== Election results ==
Kelantan state election, 2013
Party	Candidate	Votes	%	∆%
PAS	Abdul Rasul Mohamed	6,569	53.58	▲1.35
BN	Mohd Zain Ismail	5,690	46.42	▼1.35
Total valid votes		12,259	100.00	
Total rejected ballots		179		
Unreturned ballots		30		
Turnout		12,468	83.20	
Registered electors		14,988		
Majority		879	7.16	
PAS hold		Swing		

Kelantan state election, 2008
Party	Candidate	Votes	%	∆%
PAS	Abdul Fatah Harun	5,340	52.23	▲7.58
BN	Mohd Zain Ismail	4,884	47.77	▼7.58
Total valid votes		10,224	100.00	
Total rejected ballots		178		
Unreturned ballots		26		
Turnout		10,428	82.19	
Registered electors		12,688		
Majority		456	4.46	
PAS gain from BN		Swing		?

Kelantan state election, 2004
Party	Candidate	Votes	%	∆%
BN	Mohd Zain Ismail	4,493	55.35	▲17.58
PAS	Hussin Ibrahim	3,625	44.65	▼17.58
Total valid votes		8,118	100.00	
Total rejected ballots		132		
Unreturned ballots		75		
Turnout		8,325	77.92	
Registered electors		10,684		
Majority		868	10.70	
BN gain from PAS		Swing		?

Kelantan state election, 1999
Party	Candidate	Votes	%	∆%
PAS	Mohd Yusof Abdullah	6,315	62.23	▲6.16
BN	Mohd Zain Ismail	3,833	37.77	▼0.01
Total valid votes		10,148	100.00	
Total rejected ballots		238		
Unreturned ballots		3		
Turnout		10,389	71.81	
Registered electors		14,467		
Majority		2,482	24.46	
PAS hold		Swing		

Kelantan state election, 1995
Party	Candidate	Votes	%	∆%
PAS	Mohd Yusof Abdullah	5,336	56.07	▼3.82
BN	Hassan Mohamed	3,595	37.78	▼2.33
Independent	Ramli Awang	585	6.15	N/A
Total valid votes		9,516	100.00	
Total rejected ballots		247		
Unreturned ballots		21		
Turnout		9,784	68.28	
Registered electors		14,329		
Majority		1,741	18.29	
PAS hold		Swing		

Kelantan state election, 1990
Party	Candidate	Votes	%	∆%
PAS	Hussin Ibrahim	6,336	59.89	
BN	Mohd Zain Ismail	4,243	40.11	
Total valid votes		10,579	100.00	
Total rejected ballots		222		
Unreturned ballots		0		
Turnout		10,801	75.23	
Registered electors		14,358		
Majority		2,093	19.78	
PAS gain from BN		Swing		?

Kelantan state by-election, 28 June 1987 The by-election was called due to the death of incumbent, Zakaria Botok.
Party	Candidate	Votes	%	∆%
BN	Mohd Zain Ismail	3,790	44.95	▼7.36
PAS	Abdul Fatah Harun	3,672	43.55	▲4.14
Independent	Noor Mohamad Din	970	11.5	▲11.5
Total valid votes		8,432	100.00	
Total rejected ballots		60		
Unreturned ballots				
Turnout		8,492	74.56	▲0.76
Registered electors		11,389		
Majority		118	1.4	▼3.22
BN hold		Swing		

Kelantan state election, 1986
Party	Candidate	Votes	%	∆%
BN	Zakaria Botok	4,218	52.31	
PAS	Abdul Fatah Harun	3,846	47.69	
Total valid votes		8,064	100.00	
Total rejected ballots		275		
Unreturned ballots		0		
Turnout		8,339	73.80	
Registered electors		11,299		
Majority		372	4.62	
This was a new constituency created.
