= Perupok (state constituency) =

Kelantan constituency

Defunct state constituency
- Legislature: Kelantan State Legislative Assembly
- Constituency created: 1974
- Constituency abolished: 2018
- First contested: 1974
- Last contested: 2013

Perupok is a former state constituency in Kelantan, Malaysia, that has been represented in the Kelantan State Legislative Assembly.

== History ==
=== Representation history ===
Members of the Legislative Assembly for Perupok
| Assembly | No | Years | Member | Party |
Constituency created from Bachok Tengah
| 4th | N14 | 1974-1978 | Mustapha Othman | BN (PAS) |
| 5th | N14 | 1978-1982 | Wan Mohamad Wan Ahmad | BERJASA |
| 6th | N14 | 1982-1983 | Mohamed Nor Awang | PAS |
| 6th | N14 | 1983-1986 | Mohamed Nor Awang | BN (HAMIM) |
| 7th | N20 | 1986-1990 | Omar Mohammed | PAS |
| 8th | N20 | 1990–1995 | Omar Mohammed | PAS |
| 9th | N20 | 1995–1999 | Omar Mohammed | PAS |
| 10th | N20 | 1999–2004 | Omar Mohammed | PAS |
| 11th | N21 | 2004–2008 | Omar Mohammed | PAS |
| 12th | N21 | 2008–2013 | Omar Mohammed | PAS |
| 13th | N21 | 2013-2018 | Mohd Huzaimy Che Husin | PAS |
Constituency abolished, renamed to Pantai Irama

== Election results ==
Kelantan state election, 2013
| Party | Candidate | Votes | % | ∆% |
|---|---|---|---|---|
| PAS | Mohd Huzaimy Che Husin | 12,370 | 53.20 | ▼0.38 |
| BN | Mohd. Zaidi Sidek | 10,882 | 46.80 | ▲0.38 |
| Total valid votes | | 23,252 | 100.00 | |
| Total rejected ballots | | 337 | | |
| Unreturned ballots | | 73 | | |
| Turnout | | 23,662 | 87.92 | ▲2.16 |
| Registered electors | | 26,913 | | |
| Majority | | 1,488 | 6.40 | ▼0.76 |
| PAS hold | | Swing | | |

Kelantan state election, 2008
| Party | Candidate | Votes | % | ∆% |
|---|---|---|---|---|
| PAS | Omar Mohammed | 9,505 | 53.58 | ▲0.07 |
| BN | Awang Adek Hussin | 8,235 | 46.42 | ▼0.07 |
| Total valid votes | | 17,740 | 100.00 | |
| Total rejected ballots | | 242 | | |
| Unreturned ballots | | 42 | | |
| Turnout | | 18,024 | 85.76 | ▲2.85 |
| Registered electors | | 21,017 | | |
| Majority | | 1,270 | 7.16 | ▲0.14 |
| PAS hold | | Swing | | |

Kelantan state election, 2004
| Party | Candidate | Votes | % | ∆% |
|---|---|---|---|---|
| PAS | Omar Mohammed | 7,958 | 53.51 | ▼9.36 |
| BN | Mohd. Ab. Rahman | 6,914 | 46.49 | ▲9.36 |
| Total valid votes | | 14,872 | 100.00 | |
| Total rejected ballots | | 238 | | |
| Unreturned ballots | | 33 | | |
| Turnout | | 15,143 | 82.91 | ▲4.91 |
| Registered electors | | 18,264 | | |
| Majority | | 1,044 | 7.02 | ▼18.71 |
| PAS hold | | Swing | | |

Kelantan state election, 1999
| Party | Candidate | Votes | % | ∆% |
|---|---|---|---|---|
| PAS | Omar Mohammed | 7,906 | 62.87 | ▲5.51 |
| BN | Makhtar Mohd. | 4,670 | 37.13 | ▼5.51 |
| Total valid votes | | 12,576 | 100.00 | |
| Total rejected ballots | | 309 | | |
| Unreturned ballots | | 27 | | |
| Turnout | | 12,912 | 78.00 | ▲1.53 |
| Registered electors | | 16,553 | | |
| Majority | | 3,236 | 25.73 | ▲11.01 |
| PAS hold | | Swing | | |

Kelantan state election, 1995
| Party | Candidate | Votes | % | ∆% |
|---|---|---|---|---|
| PAS | Omar Mohammed | 6,953 | 57.36 | ▼5.98 |
| BN | Mohd. Khadir Hassan | 5,169 | 42.64 | ▲5.98 |
| Total valid votes | | 12,122 | 100.00 | |
| Total rejected ballots | | 280 | | |
| Unreturned ballots | | 4 | | |
| Turnout | | 12,406 | 76.48 | ▼4.57 |
| Registered electors | | 16,222 | | |
| Majority | | 1,784 | 14.72 | ▼11.97 |
| PAS hold | | Swing | | |

Kelantan state election, 1990
| Party | Candidate | Votes | % | ∆% |
|---|---|---|---|---|
| PAS | Omar Mohammed | 7,221 | 63.34 | ▲12.69 |
| BN | Chegu Noor | 4,179 | 36.66 | ▼12.69 |
| Total valid votes | | 11,400 | 100.00 | |
| Total rejected ballots | | 319 | | |
| Unreturned ballots | | 23 | | |
| Turnout | | 11,742 | 81.05 | ▲1.99 |
| Registered electors | | 14,488 | | |
| Majority | | 3,042 | 26.68 | ▲25.39 |
| PAS hold | | Swing | | |

Kelantan state election, 1986
| Party | Candidate | Votes | % |
|---|---|---|---|
| PAS | Omar Mohammed | 5,166 | 50.65 |
| BN | Chegu Noor | 5,034 | 49.35 |
| Total valid votes | | 10,200 | 100.00 |
| Total rejected ballots | | 296 | |
| Unreturned ballots | | 0 | |
| Turnout | | 10,496 | 79.05 |
| Registered electors | | 13,277 | |
| Majority | | 132 | 1.30 |
This was a new constituency created.
