= Kelaboran =

Constituency in Kelantan, Malaysia

Kelaboran (N02)
Kelantan constituency

State constituency
- Legislature: Kelantan State Legislative Assembly
MLA
Mohd Adnan Hassan
PN
- Constituency created: 1994
- First contested: 1995
- Last contested: 2023

Demographics
- Electors (2023): 38,198

Kelaboran is a state constituency in Kelantan, Malaysia, that has been represented in the Kelantan State Legislative Assembly.

The state constituency was first contested in 1995 and is mandated to return a single Assemblyman to the Kelantan State Legislative Assembly under the first-past-the-post voting system.

== Demographics ==
As of 2020, Kelaboran has a population of 42,590 people.

Ethnic breakdown of Kelaboran's electorate as of 2023
1. Malay (92.5%)
2. Other ethnicities (5.31%)
3. Chinese (1.95%)
4. Indian (0.26%)

== History ==
=== Polling districts ===
According to the Gazette issued on 30 March 2018, the Kelaboran constituency has a total of 14 polling districts.

State Constituency	Polling districts	Code	Location
Kelaboran (N02）	Jubakar Pantai	019/02/01	SK Sungai Tapang
Kelaboran (N02）	Dalam Rhu	019/02/02	SK Tumpat
Kelaboran (N02）	Bandar Tumpat	019/02/03	SK Tumpat (1)
Kelaboran (N02）	Tanjong Kuala	019/02/04	SK Sri Tumpat (2)
Kelaboran (N02）	Kampung Besut	019/02/05	Kompleks Perpaduan Jajahan Tumpat
Kelaboran (N02）	Kampung Kelong	016/02/06	Maahad Muhammadi Tumpat
Kelaboran (N02）	Kampung Berangan	016/02/07	SK Berangan (1)
Kelaboran (N02）	Kampung Padang Tembesu	019/02/08	SMK Berangan
Kelaboran (N02）	Terbak	019/02/09	SJK (C) Yuk Tze
Kelaboran (N02）	Kelaboran	019/02/10	SK Kelaboran
Kelaboran (N02）	Pulau Beluru	019/02/11	SK Pulau Beluru
Kelaboran (N02）	Mak Neralang	019/02/12	SK Kok Keli
Kelaboran (N02）	Sungai Pinang	019/02/13	SK Sungai Pinang
Kelaboran (N02）	Kok Keli	019/02/14	SK Kok Keli

=== Representation history ===
Members of the Legislative Assembly for Kelaboran
Assembly	No	Years	Member	Party
Constituency created from Sungai Pinang
9th	N02	1995–1999	Noordin Yaakub	S46
10th	N02	1999–2004	Noordin Yaakub	PAS
11th	N02	2004–2008	Mohamad Zaki Ibrahim	PAS
12th	N02	2008–2013	Mohamad Zaki Ibrahim	PR (PAS)
13th	N02	2013–2018	Mohamad Zaki Ibrahim	PR (PAS)
14th	N02	2018–2020	Mohd Adnan Hassan	PAS
14th	N02	2020–2023	Mohd Adnan Hassan	PN (PAS)
15th	N02	2023–present	Mohd Adnan Hassan	PN (PAS)

== Election results ==
Kelantan state election, 2023: Kelaboran
Party	Candidate	Votes	%	∆%
PAS	Mohd Adnan Hassan	15,890	70.91	▲14.15
BN	Mohd Rosdi Razali	6,518	29.09	▼5.19
Total valid votes		22,408	100.00	
Total rejected ballots		218		
Unreturned ballots		29		
Turnout		22,655	59.31	▼19.40
Registered electors		38,198		
Majority		9,372	41.82	▲19.30
PAS hold		Swing		

Kelantan state election, 2018: Kelaboran
Party	Candidate	Votes	%	∆%
PAS	Mohd Adanan Hassan	12,422	56.76	▲0.95
BN	Hashim Mohamad	7,493	34.24	▼9.95
PKR	Nik Faizah Nik Othman	1,790	9.00	▲9.00
Total valid votes		21,885	100.00	
Total rejected ballots		349		
Unreturned ballots		198		
Turnout		22,432	78.71	▼4.39
Registered electors		28,498		
Majority		4,929	22.52	▲10.90
PAS hold		Swing		

Kelantan state election, 2013: Kelaboran
Party	Candidate	Votes	%	∆%
PAS	Mohamad Zaki Ibrahim	10,098	55.81	▼1.51
BN	Wan Hanapi Wan Yaacob	7,995	44.19	▲1.51
Total valid votes		18,093	100.00	
Total rejected ballots		300		
Unreturned ballots		38		
Turnout		18,431	83.10	▲2.18
Registered electors		22,180		
Majority		2,103	11.62	▼3.02
PAS hold		Swing		

Kelantan state election, 2008: Kelaboran
Party	Candidate	Votes	%	∆%
PAS	Mohamad Zaki Ibrahim	8,656	57.32	▲4.69
BN	Wan Hanapi Wan Yaacob	6,444	42.68	▼4.69
Total valid votes		15,100	100.00	
Total rejected ballots		213		
Unreturned ballots		53		
Turnout		15,366	80.92	▲2.91
Registered electors		18,990		
Majority		2,212	14.64	▲9.39
PAS hold		Swing		

Kelantan state election, 2004: Kelaboran
Party	Candidate	Votes	%	∆%
PAS	Mohamad Zaki Ibrahim	6,911	52.63	▼9.93
BN	Wan Johani Wan Hussin	6,220	47.37	▲9.93
Total valid votes		13,131	100.00	
Total rejected ballots		170		
Unreturned ballots		0		
Turnout		13,301	78.00	▲1.88
Registered electors		17,052		
Majority		691	5.26	▼19.86
PAS hold		Swing		

Kelantan state election, 1999: Kelaboran
Party	Candidate	Votes	%	∆%
PAS	Noordin Yaakub	7,619	62.56	▲62.56
BN	Mansor Salleh	4,559	37.44	▼8.57
Total valid votes		12,178	100.00	
Total rejected ballots		324		
Unreturned ballots		3		
Turnout		12,505	76.12	▲0.84
Registered electors		16,428		
Majority		3,060	25.13	▲17.15
PAS hold		Swing		

Kelantan state election, 1995: Kelaboran
Party	Candidate	Votes	%
S46	Noordin Yaakub	6,252	53.99
BN	Mansor Salleh	5,328	46.01
Total valid votes		11,580	100.00
Total rejected ballots		298	
Unreturned ballots		64	
Turnout		11,942	75.28
Registered electors		15,864	
Majority		924	7.98
This was a new constituency created.
