= Panchor (state constituency) =

State constituency in Kelantan, Malaysia

Panchor (N07)
Kelantan constituency

State constituency
- Legislature: Kelantan State Legislative Assembly
MLA
Mohd Amar Abdullah
PN
- Constituency created: 1994
- First contested: 1995
- Last contested: 2023

Demographics
- Electors (2023): 42,768

Panchor is a state constituency in Kelantan, Malaysia, that has been represented in the Kelantan State Legislative Assembly.

The state constituency was first contested in 1995 and is mandated to return a single Assemblyman to the Kelantan State Legislative Assembly under the first-past-the-post voting system.

== Demographics ==
As of 2020, Panchor has a population of 75,940 people.

Ethnic breakdown of Panchor's electorate as of 2023
1. Malay (96.7%)
2. Chinese (2.20%)
3. Other ethnicities (0.84%)
4. Indian (0.21%)

== History ==
=== Polling districts ===
According to the Gazette issued on 30 March 2018, the Panchor constituency has a total of 12 polling districts.

State Constituency	Polling Districts	Code	Location
Panchor (N07)	Taman Kemunin	020/07/01	SK Datu' Hashim
Panchor (N07)	Tapang	020/07/02	SK Tapang
Panchor (N07)	Kemunin	020/07/03	SK Kemunin
Panchor (N07)	Panchor	020/07/04	SK Panji
Panchor (N07)	Sering	020/07/05	SK Sering
Panchor (N07)	Pasir Kasar	020/07/06	SMK Sering
Panchor (N07)	Pulau Belaga	020/07/07	SK Chicha Menyabong
Panchor (N07)	Tok Ku	020/07/08	SMK Raja Sakti
Panchor (N07)	Kampung Belukar	020/07/09	SMK Panji
Panchor (N07)	Padang Tembak	020/07/10	SMU (A) Tarbiah Mardziah
Panchor (N07)	Panji	020/07/11	SMK Panchor Perdana
Panchor (N07)	Pasir Tok Kambing	020/07/12	SK Raja Bahar

=== Representation history ===
Members of the Legislative Assembly for Panchor
Assembly	No	Years	Member	Party
Constituency created from Kemumin
9th	N06	1995–1999	Mohd Yusoff Ludin	PAS
10th	N06	1999–2004	Mohd Yusoff Ludin	PAS
11th	N07	2004–2008	Mohd Amar Abdullah	PAS
12th	N07	2008–2013	Mohd Amar Abdullah	PR (PAS)
13th	N07	2013–2018	Mohd Amar Abdullah	PR (PAS)
14th	N07	2018–2020	Mohd Amar Abdullah	PAS
14th	N07	2020–2023	Mohd Amar Abdullah	PN (PAS)
15th	N07	2023–present	Mohd Amar Abdullah	PN (PAS)

== Election results ==
Kelantan state election, 2023
Party	Candidate	Votes	%	∆%
PAS	Mohd Amar Abdullah	18,700	70.00	▲9.03
PH	Syed Mohd Alidustur Syed Mohd Zain	8,014	30.00	▲30.00
Total valid votes		26,714	100.00	
Total rejected ballots		318		
Unreturned ballots		108		
Turnout		27,140	63.46	▼16.62
Registered electors		42,768		
Majority		10,686	40.00	▲7.32
PAS hold		Swing		

Kelantan state election, 2018
Party	Candidate	Votes	%	∆%
PAS	Mohd Amar Abdullah	13,597	60.97	▼1.68
BN	Zarina Md Eusope	6,309	28.29	▼9.06
PKR	Mohd Zulhazmi Hassan	2,394	10.74	▲10.74
Total valid votes		22,300	100.00	
Total rejected ballots		224		
Unreturned ballots		306		
Turnout		22,830	80.08	▼3.10
Registered electors		28,509		
Majority		7,288	32.68	▲7.38
PAS hold		Swing		

Kelantan state election, 2013
Party	Candidate	Votes	%	∆%
PAS	Mohd Amar Abdullah	12,467	62.65	▲1.08
BN	Che Rosli Hassan	7,431	37.35	▼1.08
Total valid votes		19,898	100.00	
Total rejected ballots		209		
Unreturned ballots		80		
Turnout		20,187	83.18	▼3.92
Registered electors		23,176		
Majority		5,036	25.30	▲2.16
PAS hold		Swing		

Kelantan state election, 2008
Party	Candidate	Votes	%	∆%
PAS	Mohd Amar Abdullah	9,148	61.57	▲2.99
BN	Dali Hussin	5,711	38.43	▼2.99
Total valid votes		14,859	100.00	
Total rejected ballots		190		
Unreturned ballots		145		
Turnout		15,194	83.18	▲3.06
Registered electors		18,267		
Majority		3,437	23.13	▲5.99
PAS hold		Swing		

Kelantan state election, 2004
Party	Candidate	Votes	%	∆%
PAS	Mohd Amar Abdullah	7,123	58.57	▼12.48
BN	Zulkifli Dollah	5,038	41.43	▲12.48
Total valid votes		12,161	100.00	
Total rejected ballots		188		
Unreturned ballots		143		
Turnout		12,492	80.11	▲4.77
Registered electors		15,593		
Majority		2,085	17.14	▼24.96
PAS hold		Swing		

Kelantan state election, 1999
Party	Candidate	Votes	%	∆%
PAS	Mohd Yusoff Ludin	7,443	71.05	▲6.41
BN	Nik Mohd Zain Omar	3,032	28.95	▼5.35
Total valid votes		10,475	100.00	
Total rejected ballots		264		
Unreturned ballots		51		
Turnout		10,790	75.34	▲0.94
Registered electors		14,321		
Majority		4,411	42.11	▲11.76
PAS hold		Swing		

Kelantan state election, 1995
Party	Candidate	Votes	%
PAS	Mohd Yusoff Ludin	6,499	64.65
BN	Mohd Noor Deris	3,448	34.30
KITA	Yusof bin Mat	106	1.05
Total valid votes		10,053	100.00
Total rejected ballots		260	
Unreturned ballots		105	
Turnout		10,418	74.40
Registered electors		14,002	
Majority		3,051	30.35
This was a new constituency created.
