= Pasir Tumboh =

State constituency in Kelantan, Malaysia

Pasir Tumboh (N18)
Kelantan constituency

State constituency
- Legislature: Kelantan State Legislative Assembly
MLA
Abd Rahman Yunus
PN
- Constituency created: 1995
- First contested: 1995
- Last contested: 2023

Demographics
- Electors (2023): 37,498

Pasir Tumboh is a state constituency in Kelantan, Malaysia, that has been represented in the Kelantan State Legislative Assembly.

The state constituency was first contested in 1995 and is mandated to return a single Assemblyman to the Kelantan State Legislative Assembly under the first-past-the-post voting system.

== Demographics ==
As of 2020, Pasir Tumboh has a population of 59,842 people.

Ethnic breakdown of Pasir Tumboh's electorate as of 2023
1. Malay (98.0%)
2. Chinese (1.20%)
3. Other ethnicities (0.64%)
4. Indian (0.12%)

== History ==
=== Polling districts ===
According to the Gazette issued on 30 March 2018, the Pasir Tumboh constituency has a total of 12 polling districts.

State Constituency	Polling Districts	Code	Location
Pasir Tumboh (N18）	Padang Enggang	024/18/01	SMK Padang Enggang
Pasir Tumboh (N18）	Pasir Hor	024/18/02	SK Pasir Hor
Pasir Tumboh (N18）	Tiong	024/18/03	SK Tiong
Pasir Tumboh (N18）	Tunjong	024/18/04	Dewan Sri Tunjong JPN Kelantan
Pasir Tumboh (N18）	Kampung Parit	024/18/05	SK Seribong
Pasir Tumboh (N18）	Pasir Tumboh	024/18/06	SK Long Gafar
Pasir Tumboh (N18）	Kampung Terusan	024/18/07	MRSM Pasir Tumboh
Pasir Tumboh (N18）	Guntong	024/18/08	SMK Long Gafar
Pasir Tumboh (N18）	Lating	024/18/09	SK Kampong Keling
Pasir Tumboh (N18）	Nilam Baru	024/18/10	Kolej Islam Antarabangsa Sultan Ismail Petra
Pasir Tumboh (N18）	Gong Dermin	024/18/11	SK Gong Dermin
Pasir Tumboh (N18）	Kampung Padang	024/18/12	SMK Puteri Saadong

=== Representation history ===
Members of the Legislative Assembly for Pasir Tumboh
Assembly	No	Years	Member	Party
Constituency created from Mulong
9th	N17	1995–1999	Daud Yusof	PAS
9th	N17	1999	Vacant	
10th	N17	1999–2004	Ahmad Baihaqi Atiqullah	PAS
11th	N18	2004–2008	Ahmad Baihaqi Atiqullah	PAS
12th	N18	2008–2013	Ahmad Baihaqi Atiqullah	PR (PAS)
13th	N18	2013–2018	Abd Rahman Yunus	PR (PAS)
14th	N18	2018–2020	Abd Rahman Yunus	PAS
14th	N18	2020–2023	Abd Rahman Yunus	PN (PAS)
15th	N18	2023–present	Abd Rahman Yunus	PN (PAS)

== Election results ==
Kelantan state election, 2023: Pasir Tumboh
Party	Candidate	Votes	%	∆%
PAS	Abd Rahman Yunus	17,814	76.61	▲15.11
PH	Naziratul Aini Mohd Sayuty	5,440	23.39	▲23.39
Total valid votes		23,254	100.00	
Total rejected ballots		163		
Unreturned ballots		76		
Turnout		23,493	62.65	▼16.22
Registered electors		37,498		
Majority		12,374	53.22	▲16.61
PAS hold		Swing		

Kelantan state election, 2018: Pasir Tumboh
Party	Candidate	Votes	%	∆%
PAS	Abd Rahman Yunus	12,470	61.50	▼3.07
BN	Bakri Yusof	5,049	24.89	▼10.54
PKR	Mohd Noor Mat Yajid	2,759	13.61	▲13.61
Total valid votes		20,278	100.00	
Total rejected ballots		221		
Unreturned ballots		210		
Turnout		20,709	78.87	▼5.70
Registered electors		26,257		
Majority		7,421	36.61	▲7.47
PAS hold		Swing		

Kelantan state election, 2013: Pasir Tumboh
Party	Candidate	Votes	%	∆%
PAS	Abd Rahman Yunus	9,972	64.57	▲0.57
BN	Mohd Syamsul Mohd Yusoff Al-Hafiz	5,471	35.43	▼0.57
Total valid votes		15,443	100.00	
Total rejected ballots		170		
Unreturned ballots		48		
Turnout		15,661	84.57	▲1.67
Registered electors		18,518		
Majority		4,501	29.14	▲1.15
PAS hold		Swing		

Kelantan state election, 2008: Pasir Tumboh
Party	Candidate	Votes	%	∆%
PAS	Ahmad Baihaki Atiqullah	7,779	64.00	▲5.79
BN	Anuar Safian	4,376	36.00	▼5.79
Total valid votes		12,155	100.00	
Total rejected ballots		113		
Unreturned ballots		24		
Turnout		12,292	82.90	▲1.13
Registered electors		14,827		
Majority		3,403	28.00	▲11.59
PAS hold		Swing		

Kelantan state election, 2004: Pasir Tumboh
Party	Candidate	Votes	%	∆%
PAS	Ahmad Baihaki Atiqullah	6,332	58.20	▼12.98
BN	Nik Ab. Rahman Nik Taib	4,547	41.80	▲12.98
Total valid votes		10,879	100.00	
Total rejected ballots		352		
Unreturned ballots		0		
Turnout		11,231	81.78	▲4.27
Registered electors		13,734		
Majority		1,785	16.41	▼25.96
PAS hold		Swing		

Kelantan state election, 1999: Pasir Tumboh
Party	Candidate	Votes	%	∆%
PAS	Ahmad Baihaki Atiqullah	7,042	71.18	▲5.18
BN	Tuan Mohamad Hashim Tuan Yaacob	2,851	28.82	▼5.18
Total valid votes		9,893	100.00	
Total rejected ballots		205		
Unreturned ballots		10		
Turnout		10,108	77.50	▲1.25
Registered electors		13,042		
Majority		4,191	42.36	▲10.36
PAS hold		Swing		

Kelantan state election, 1995: Pasir Tumboh
Party	Candidate	Votes	%
PAS	Wan Daud Wan Jusoh	6,129	66.00
BN	Mustafa Taib	3,157	34.00
Total valid votes		9,286	100.00
Total rejected ballots		147	
Unreturned ballots		28	
Turnout		9,461	76.26
Registered electors		12,407	
Majority		2,972	32.01
This was a new constituency created.
