= 2014 Pengkalan Kubor by-election =

Election in Malaysia

- 25 September 2014

Pengkalan Kubor seat in the Kelantan State Legislative Assembly
	BN	PAS	IND
Candidate	Mat Razi Mat Ail	Sharif Mahmood	Izat Bukhary Ismail Bukhary
Party	BN (UMNO)	PAS	Independent
Alliance		PR
Popular vote	9,961	7,326	38
Percentage	57.49%	42.29%	0.22%
Pengkalan Kubor assemblyman before election
Noor Zahidi Omar
BN (UMNO)
Elected Pengkalan Kubor assemblyman
Mat Razi Mat Ail
BN (UMNO)

A by-election was held for the Kelantan State Assembly seat of Pengkalan Kubor on 25 September 2014 following the nomination day on 13 September 2014. The seat fell vacant after the death of the incumbent three-term assemblyman, Noor Zahidi Omar from liver cancer in Guangzhou, China on 20 August 2014. Zahidi was an assemblyman from the United Malays National Organisation, a component party of the opposition Barisan Nasional coalition. In the 2013 general election, he defeated Pakatan Rakyat (PKR) candidate Saharun Ibrahim and an independent candidate by 1,736 votes.

Mat Razi Mat Ail from UMNO represented Barisan Nasional. Pakatan Rakyat was represented by Wan Rosdi Wan Ibrahim from PAS. Independent candidate Izat Bukhary Ismail Bukhary will also be contesting the seat. A total of 24,039 voters can vote in the by-election.

== Results ==
Kelantan state by-election, 25 September 2014: Pengkalan Kubor The by-election was called due to the death of incumbent, Noor Zahidi Omar.
Party	Candidate	Votes	%	∆%
BN	Mat Razi Mat Ail	9,961	57.49	
PAS	Wan Rosdi Wan Ibrahim	7,326	42.29	
Independent	Izat Bukhary Ismail Bukhary	38	0.22	
Total valid votes		17,325	100.00	
Total rejected ballots		230		
Unreturned ballots		3		
Turnout		17,558	73.04	
Registered electors		24,039		
Majority		2,635		
BN hold		Swing		
Source(s) "Pilihan Raya Kecil N.01 Pengkalan Kubor". Election Commission of Malaysia. Archived from the original on 2018-09-19. "Federal Government Gazette - Notice of Contested Election - By-election of the State Legislative Assembly of N.01 Pengkalan Kubor for the State of Kelantan [P.U. (B) 415/2014]" (PDF). Attorney General's Chambers of Malaysia. 15 September 2014. "Federal Government Gazette - Results of Contested Election and Statement of the Poll after the Official Addition of Votes for the By-election of N.01 Pengkalan Kubor [P.U. (B) 429/2014]" (PDF). Attorney General's Chambers of Malaysia. 30 September 2014.
