= Bukit Bunga (state constituency) =

State constituency in Kelantan, Malaysia

Bukit Bunga (N36)
Kelantan constituency

State constituency
- Legislature: Kelantan State Legislative Assembly
MLA
Mohd Almidi Jaafar
PN
- Constituency created: 2003
- First contested: 2004
- Last contested: 2023

Demographics
- Electors (2023): 21,722

Bukit Bunga is a state constituency in Kelantan, Malaysia, that has been represented in the Kelantan State Legislative Assembly.

The state constituency was first contested in 2004 and is mandated to return a single Assemblyman to the Kelantan State Legislative Assembly under the first-past-the-post voting system.

== Demographics ==
As of 2020, Bukit Bunga has a population of 23,828 people.

Ethnic breakdown of Bukit Bunga's electorate as of 2023
1. Malay (98.3%)
2. Other ethnicities (1.45%)
3. Chinese (0.17%)
4. Indian (0.10%)

== History ==
=== Polling districts ===
According to the Gazette issued on 30 March 2018, the Bukit Bunga constituency has a total of 10 polling districts.

State Constituency	Polling Districts	Code	Location
Bukit Bunga (N36）	Bukit Bunga	030/36/01	SMK Bukit Bunga
Bukit Bunga (N36）	Jakar	030/36/02	SK Nik Daud
Bukit Bunga (N36）	Nibong	030/36/03	SK Nik Daud
Bukit Bunga (N36）	Jedok Tua	030/36/04	SMU (A) Arab Darul Naim
Bukit Bunga (N36）	Lalang Pepuyu	030/36/05	SK Lalang Pepuyu
Bukit Bunga (N36）	Batu Gajah	030/36/06	SK Batu Gajah
Bukit Bunga (N36）	Asahan	030/36/07	SMK Tan Sri Mohamed Yaacob
Bukit Bunga (N36）	Lawang	030/36/08	SK Lawang
Bukit Bunga (N36）	Gual Jedok	030/36/09	SK Gual Jedok
Bukit Bunga (N36）	Air Canal	030/36/10	SK Ayer Chanal

=== Representation history ===
Members of the Legislative Assembly for Bukit Bunga
Assembly	No	Years	Member	Party
Constituency created from Kemahang
11th	N36	2004–2008	Mohd Adhan Kechik	BN (UMNO)
12th	N36	2008–2013	Mohd Adhan Kechik	BN (UMNO)
13th	N36	2013–2018	Mohd Adhan Kechik	BN (UMNO)
14th	N36	2018–2023	Mohd Adhan Kechik	BN (UMNO)
15th	N36	2023–present	Mohd Almidi Jaafar	PN (BERSATU)

== Election results ==
Kelantan state election, 2023
Party	Candidate	Votes	%	∆%
PAS	Mohd Almidi Jaafar	8,540	66.06	▲22.40
BN	Mohd Adhan Kechik	4,388	33.94	▼17.60
Total valid votes		12,928	100.00	
Total rejected ballots		133		
Unreturned ballots		17		
Turnout		13,078	60.21	▼20.73
Registered electors		21,722		
Majority		4,152	32.12	▲24.24
PAS gain from BN		Swing		?

Kelantan state election, 2018
Party	Candidate	Votes	%	∆%
BN	Mohd Adhan Kechik	7,068	51.54	▼3.99
PAS	Ramzi Mohd Yusoff	5,987	43.66	▼0.81
PKR	Asran Alias	659	4.81	▲4.81
Total valid votes		13,714	100.00	
Total rejected ballots		144		
Unreturned ballots		186		
Turnout		14,044	80.94	▼3.66
Registered electors		17,352		
Majority		1,081	7.88	▼3.18
BN hold		Swing		

Kelantan state election, 2013
Party	Candidate	Votes	%	∆%
BN	Mohd Adhan Kechik	7,692	55.53	▲3.96
PAS	Sufely Abd Razak	6,159	44.47	▼3.96
Total valid votes		13,851	100.00	
Total rejected ballots		176		
Unreturned ballots		26		
Turnout		14,053	84.60	▲2.75
Registered electors		16,609		
Majority		1,533	11.06	▲7.92
BN hold		Swing		

Kelantan state election, 2008
Party	Candidate	Votes	%	∆%
BN	Mohd Adhan Kechik	5,731	51.57	▼12.86
PAS	Sufely Abd Razak	5,383	48.43	▲12.86
Total valid votes		11,114	100.00	
Total rejected ballots		239		
Unreturned ballots		53		
Turnout		11,406	81.85	▲2.22
Registered electors		13,935		
Majority		348	3.14	▼25.72
BN hold		Swing		

Kelantan state election, 2004
Party	Candidate	Votes	%
BN	Mohd Adhan Kechik	6,397	64.43
PAS	Sufely Abd Razak	3,531	35.57
Total valid votes		9,928	100.00
Total rejected ballots		158	
Unreturned ballots		0	
Turnout		10,086	79.63
Registered electors		12,666	
Majority		2,866	28.86
This was a new constituency created.
