= Manek Urai (state constituency) =

State constituency in Kelantan, Malaysia

Manek Urai (N41)
Kelantan constituency

State constituency
- Legislature: Kelantan State Legislative Assembly
MLA
Mohd Fauzi Abdullah
PN
- Constituency abolished: 1974
- First contested: 1974
- Last contested: 2023

Demographics
- Electors (2023): 22,611

Manek Urai is a state constituency in Kelantan, Malaysia, that has been represented in the Kelantan State Legislative Assembly.

The state constituency was first contested in 1974 and is mandated to return a single Assemblyman to the Kelantan State Legislative Assembly under the first-past-the-post voting system.

== Demographics ==
Ethnic breakdown of Manek Urai's electorate as of 2023
1. Malay (98.9%)
2. Other ethnicities (0.60%)
3. Indian (0.25%)
4. Chinese (0.24%)

== History ==
=== Polling districts ===
According to the Gazette issued on 30 March 2018, the Manek Urai constituency has a total of 9 polling districts.

State Constituency	Polling Districts	Code	Location
Manek Urai (N41)	Temalir	031/41/01	SK Temalir
Manek Urai (N41)	Sungai Perial	031/41/02	SK Peria
Manek Urai (N41)	Manek Urai Lama	031/41/03	SK Manek Urai
Manek Urai (N41)	Manek Urai Baru	031/41/04	SK Manek Urai Baru
Manek Urai (N41)	Sungai Sok	031/41/05	SK Sungai Sok
Manek Urai (N41)	Chuchoh Puteri	031/41/06	SK Chuchoh Puteri
Manek Urai (N41)	Lata Rek	031/41/07	SK Lata Rek
Manek Urai (N41)	Manjor	031/41/08	SK Kampong Karangan
Manek Urai (N41)	Laloh	031/41/09	SMK Laloh

=== Representation history ===
Members of the Legislative Assembly for Manek Urai
Assembly	No	Years	Member	Party
Constituency created from Ulu Kelantan Timor
4th	N36	1974–1978	Hussein Sulaiman	BN (UMNO)
5th	N36	1978–1982	Wan Abdullah Wan Su	PAS
6th	N36	1982–1986	Ariffin Said	BN (UMNO)
7th	N36	1986–1990	Ismail Yaacob	PAS
8th	N36	1990–1995	Ismail Yaacob	PAS
9th	N40	1995–1999	Ismail Yaacob	PAS
10th	N40	1999–2004	Ismail Yaacob	PAS
11th	N41	2004–2008	Mohamed Zulkepli Omar	BN (UMNO)
12th	N41	2008–2009	Ismail Yaacob	PR (PAS)
12th	N41	2009–2013	Mohd Fauzi Abdullah	PR (PAS)
13th	N41	2013–2018	Mohd Fauzi Abdullah	PR (PAS)
14th	N41	2018–2020	Mohd Fauzi Abdullah	PAS
14th	N41	2020–2023	Mohd Fauzi Abdullah	PN (PAS)
15th	N41	2023–present	Mohd Fauzi Abdullah	PN (PAS)

== Election results ==
Kelantan state election, 2023
Party	Candidate	Votes	%	∆%
PAS	Mohd Fauzi Abdullah	10,355	78.33	▲17.07
BN	Suzaini Adlina Sukri	2,865	21.67	▼13.24
Total valid votes		13,220	100.00	
Total rejected ballots		113		
Unreturned ballots		13		
Turnout		13,346	59.02	▼23.10
Registered electors		22,611		
Majority		7,490	56.66	▲30.31
PAS hold		Swing		

Kelantan state election, 2018
Party	Candidate	Votes	%	∆%
PAS	Mohd Fauzi Abdullah	8,683	61.26	▲5.42
BN	Suzaini Adlina Sukri	4,948	34.91	▼9.25
PKR	Mohamed Dahan Mat Jali	503	3.55	▲3.55
Independent	Deraman Mamat	41	0.29	▲0.29
Total valid votes		14,175	100.00	
Total rejected ballots		267		
Unreturned ballots		112		
Turnout		14,554	82.12	▼7.08
Registered electors		17,722		
Majority		3,735	26.35	▲14.67
PAS hold		Swing		

Kelantan state election, 2013
Party	Candidate	Votes	%	∆%
PAS	Mohd Fauzi Abdullah	7,802	55.84	▲5.53
BN	Che Jalal Muda	6,169	44.16	▼5.53
Total valid votes		13,971	100.00	
Total rejected ballots		160		
Unreturned ballots		38		
Turnout		14,169	89.20	▲1.72
Registered electors		15,879		
Majority		1,633	11.68	▲11.06
PAS hold		Swing		

Kelantan state by-election, 14 July 2009 The by-election was called due to the death of incumbent, Ismail Yaacob.
Party	Candidate	Votes	%	∆%
PAS	Mohd Fauzi Abdullah	5,348	50.31	▼6.36
BN	Tuan Aziz Tuan Hamat	5,283	49.69	▲6.36
Total valid votes		10,631	100.00	
Total rejected ballots		117		
Unreturned ballots		6		
Turnout		10,754	87.48	▲3.25
Registered electors		12,293		
Majority		65	0.62	▼12.72
PAS hold		Swing		
Source(s) "Pilihan Raya Kecil N.41 Manek Urai". Election Commission of Malaysia.

Kelantan state election, 2008
Party	Candidate	Votes	%	∆%
PAS	Ismail Yaacob	5,746	56.67	▲6.98
BN	Mohamed Dahan Mat Jali	4,394	43.33	▼6.98
Total valid votes		10,140	100.00	
Total rejected ballots		192		
Unreturned ballots		21		
Turnout		10,353	84.23	▲2.14
Registered electors		12,292		
Majority		1,352	13.34	▲12.72
PAS gain from BN		Swing		?

Kelantan state election, 2004
Party	Candidate	Votes	%	∆%
BN	Mohamed Zulkepli Omar	4,362	50.31	▲9.12
PAS	Mohd Zamzuri Mat Lazim	4,309	49.69	▼9.12
Total valid votes		8,671	100.00	
Total rejected ballots		105		
Unreturned ballots		12		
Turnout		8,788	82.09	▲3.46
Registered electors		10,705		
Majority		53	0.62	▼17.00
BN gain from PAS		Swing		?

Kelantan state election, 1999
Party	Candidate	Votes	%	∆%
PAS	Ismail Yaacob	5,066	58.81	▼3.30
BN	Wan Zaid Wan Abdullah	3,548	41.19	▲3.30
Total valid votes		8,614	100.00	
Total rejected ballots		233		
Unreturned ballots		3		
Turnout		8,850	78.63	▲3.93
Registered electors		11,255		
Majority		1,518	17.62	▼6.60
PAS hold		Swing		

Kelantan state election, 1995
Party	Candidate	Votes	%	∆%
PAS	Ismail Yaacob	4,691	62.11	▼8.60
BN	Ahmad Yusoff	2,862	37.89	▲8.60
Total valid votes		7,553	100.00	
Total rejected ballots		212		
Unreturned ballots		13		
Turnout		7,778	74.70	▼4.23
Registered electors		10,412		
Majority		1,829	24.22	▼18.51
PAS hold		Swing		

Kelantan state election, 1990
Party	Candidate	Votes	%	∆%
PAS	Ismail Yaacob	5,970	70.71	▲16.28
BN	Wan Zaid Wan Abdullah	2,362	27.98	▼17.59
Independent	Zakaria Awang	111	1.31	▲1.31
Total valid votes		8,443	100.00	
Total rejected ballots		245		
Unreturned ballots		0		
Turnout		8,688	78.93	▲0.12
Registered electors		11,007		
Majority		3,608	42.73	▲33.87
PAS hold		Swing		

Kelantan state election, 1986
Party	Candidate	Votes	%	∆%
PAS	Ismail Yaacob	3,650	54.43	▼1.98
BN	Wan Zaid Wan Abdullah	3,056	45.57	▲1.98
Total valid votes		6,706	100.00	
Total rejected ballots		275		
Unreturned ballots		0		
Turnout		6,981	78.81	▲2.82
Registered electors		8,858		
Majority		594	8.86	▼3.92
PAS gain from BN		Swing		?

Kelantan state election, 1982
Party	Candidate	Votes	%	∆%
BN	Ariffin Said	4,584	56.41	▲7.72
PAS	Wan Abdullah Wan Su	3,542	43.59	▼7.72
Total valid votes		8,126	100.00	
Total rejected ballots		153		
Unreturned ballots		0		
Turnout		8,279	81.63	▲8.22
Registered electors		10,142		
Majority		1,042	12.82	▲10.21
BN gain from PAS		Swing		-

Kelantan state election, 1978
Party	Candidate	Votes	%	∆%
PAS	Wan Abdullah Wan Su	1,926	51.31	▲51.31
BN	HusseinSulaiman	1,828	48.69	▼22.91
Total valid votes		3,754	100.00	
Total rejected ballots		48		
Unreturned ballots		0		
Turnout		3,802	73.41	▲2.27
Registered electors		5,179		
Majority		98	2.61	▼40.60
PAS gain from BN		Swing		-

Kelantan state election, 1974
Party	Candidate	Votes	%
BN	Hussein Sulaiman	2,411	71.61
Independent	Wan Abdullah Wan Su	956	28.39
Total valid votes		3,367	100.00
Total rejected ballots		87	
Unreturned ballots		0	
Turnout		3,454	71.14
Registered electors		4,855	
Majority		1,455	43.21
This was a new constituency created.
