= 2018 Kelantan state election =

Malaysian state legislative election

- 9 May 2018

All 45 seats of the Kelantan State Legislative Assembly 23 seats needed for a majority
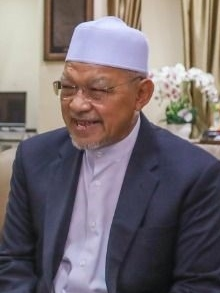

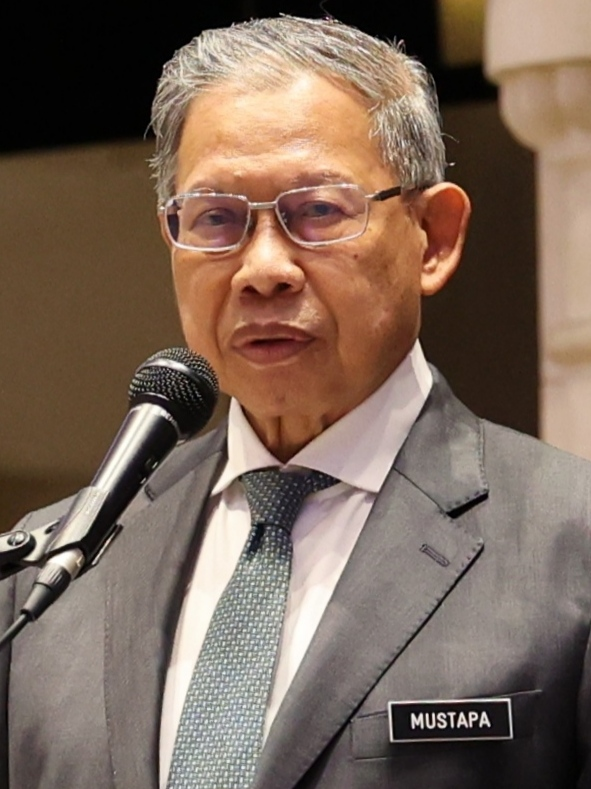

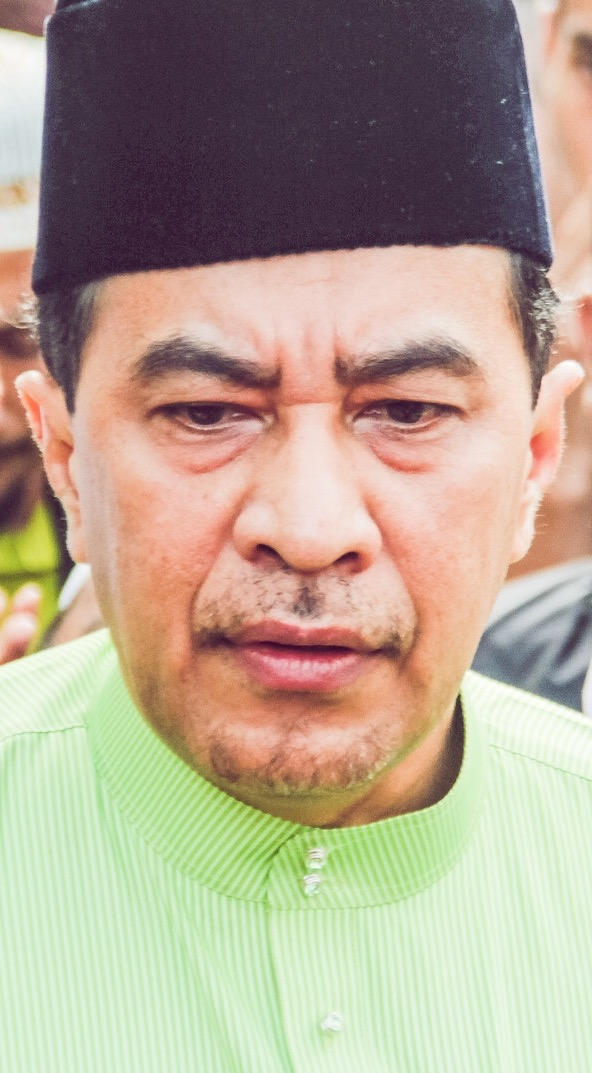
	Majority party	Minority party	Third party
Leader	Ahmad Yakob	Mustapa Mohamed	Husam Musa
Party	Gagasan Sejahtera (PAS)	Barisan Nasional (UMNO)	Pakatan Harapan (AMANAH)
Leader since	2013	2009	30 August 2017
Leader's seat	Pasir Pekan	Ayer Lanas	Salor (lost seat)
Last election	32 seats, 44.20% (Pakatan Rakyat)	12 seats, 42.95%	1 seat, 9.50% (Pakatan Rakyat)
Seats before	31	11	2
Seats won	37	8	0
Seat change	▲6	▼3	▼2
Popular vote	426,602	308,639	82,243
Percentage	52.0%	37.6%	10.0%
Swing	▲7.8%	▼5.4%	▲0.5%
Menteri Besar before election
Ahmad Yakob
Gagasan Sejahtera, (PAS)
Elected Menteri Besar
Ahmad Yakob
Gagasan Sejahtera, (PAS)

The 14th Kelantan State election was held on 9 May 2018, concurrently with the 2018 Malaysian general election. The previous state election was held on 5 May 2013. The state assemblymen is elected to 5 years term each.

The Kelantan State Legislative Assembly would automatically dissolve on 13 June 2018, the fifth anniversary of the first sitting, and elections must be held within sixty days (two months) of the dissolution (on or before 13 August 2018, with the date to be decided by the Election Commission), unless dissolved prior to that date by the Head of State (Sultan of Kelantan) on the advice of the Head of Government (Menteri Besar of Kelantan).

Pan-Malaysian Islamic Party (PAS) continued their domination of Kelantan government since 1990, winning 37 seats out of 45 and gaining a supermajority in the Kelantan Assembly. Barisan Nasional (BN) only won 8 seats and confirming their status as the opposition, while Pakatan Harapan is unrepresented in the assembly after all their candidates lose. Ahmad Yakob from PAS was sworn in as Menteri Besar for the second term, on 10 May 2018.

== Contenders ==
Barisan Nasional (BN) is set to contest all 45 seats in Kelantan State Legislative Assembly. Barisan Nasional (BN) linchpin party United Malays National Organisation (UMNO) is to set to contest major share of Barisan Nasional (BN) seats.

Pan-Malaysian Islamic Party (PAS) is set to contest all 45 seats in Kelantan to defend their victory in the last election. This is the first election without former Spiritual Leader of PAS and former Menteri Besar, Nik Aziz Nik Mat after his death in 2015.

Pakatan Harapan have decided to contest all 45 seats in Kelantan. However, Pakatan Harapan has yet to finalize 14 seats at the moment. The seats are including Demit, Kemahang, Kemuning, Tawang and Kijang. On 1 March 2018, Pakatan Harapan has completed the distribution of seats in Kelantan. National Trust Party (Amanah) will contest in 23 seats while the Malaysian United Indigenous Party (Bersatu) will have 11 seats. People's Justice Party (PKR) will contest 10 seats while the Democratic Action Party (DAP) will contest a single seat, which is in Galas.

Parti Sosialis Malaysia (PSM) will contest in Kota Lama.

=== Political parties ===
Coalition			Other parties
Incumbent	Opposition		Other parties
Gagasan Sejahtera (GS)	Barisan Nasional (BN)	Pakatan Harapan (PH)	Socialist Party of Malaysia (Parti Sosialis Malaysia)
Malaysian Islamic Party (PAS)	United Malays National Organisation (UMNO); Malaysian Chinese Association (MCA)	National Trust Party (Amanah); Malaysian United Indigenous Party (Bersatu); People's Justice Party (PKR); Democratic Action Party (DAP)	Socialist Party of Malaysia (Parti Sosialis Malaysia)

== The contested seats ==
No.	State constituency	Incumbent State Assemblyman	Political parties							
No.	State constituency	Incumbent State Assemblyman	Gagasan Sejahtera		Barisan Nasional		Pakatan Harapan		Other parties/Ind	
No.	State constituency	Incumbent State Assemblyman	Candidate Name	Party	Candidate Name	Party	Candidate Name	Party	Candidate Name	Party
N01	Pengkalan Kubor	Mat Razi Mat Ail (BN)	Wan Roslan Wan Hamat	PAS	Mat Razi Mat Ail	UMNO	Wan Rosdi Mat Rasik	PKR	—N/a	—N/a
N02	Kelaboran	Mohamad Zaki Ibrahim (GS)	Mohd Adenan Hassan	PAS	Hashim Mohamad	UMNO	Nik Faezah Nik Othman	Amanah	—N/a	—N/a
N03	Pasir Pekan	Ahmad Yaakob (GS)	Ahmad Yaakob	PAS	Wan Mohd Sanusi Wan Yunus	UMNO	Wan Johari Wan Omar	Bersatu	—N/a	—N/a
N04	Wakaf Bharu	Che Abdullah Mat Nawi (GS)	Mohd Rusli Abdullah	PAS	Mohd Rosdi Ab Aziz	UMNO	Mohd. Khir Zahari Abdul Ghani	Amanah	—N/a	—N/a
N05	Kijang	Wan Ubaidah Omar (GS)	Izani Husin	PAS	Wan Shahrul Azwan Abd Aziz	UMNO	Nik Azmi Nik Man	PKR	—N/a	—N/a
N06	Chempaka	Ahmad Fathan Mahmood (GS)	Ahmad Fathan Mahmood	PAS	Mohd Fareez Noor Amran	UMNO	Nik Omar Nik Ab. Aziz	Amanah	—N/a	—N/a
N07	Panchor	Mohd Amar Abdullah (GS)	Mohd Amar Abdullah	PAS	Zarina Md Eusope	UMNO	Mohd. Zulhazmi Hassan	Amanah	—N/a	—N/a
N08	Tanjong Mas	Rohani Ibrahim (GS)	Rohani Ibrahim	PAS	Madihah Abd Aziz	UMNO	Hafidzah Mustakim	Amanah	—N/a	—N/a
N09	Kota Lama	Anuar Tan Abdullah (GS)	Anuar Tan Abdullah	PAS	Chua Hock Kuan	MCA	Ab. Rashid Ab. Rahman	Bersatu	Khairul Nizam Abd Ghani	PSM
N09	Kota Lama	Anuar Tan Abdullah (GS)	Anuar Tan Abdullah	PAS	Chua Hock Kuan	MCA	Ab. Rashid Ab. Rahman	Bersatu	Izat Bukhary Ismail Bukhary	IND
N10	Bunut Payong	Ramli Mamat (GS)	Ramli Mamat	PAS	Mohamed Hasna Che Hussin	UMNO	Sanusi Othman	Amanah	—N/a	—N/a
N11	Tendong	Rozi Muhamad (GS)	Rozi Muhamad	PAS	Yahaya Mamat	UMNO	Wan Zulkhairi Wan Md. Zin	Bersatu	Ibrahim Ali	IND
N12	Pengkalan Pasir	Hanifa Ahmad (GS)	Hanifa Ahmad	PAS	Che Johan Che Pa	UMNO	Sharani Mohd Naim	Amanah	Suharto Mat Nasir	IND
N13	Meranti	Mohd Nassurruddin Daud (GS)	Mohd Nassurruddin Daud	PAS	Muhammad Afifi Muhammad Noor	UMNO	Mohd Romizu Mohd Ali	Amanah	Che Daud Che Man	IND
N14	Chetok	Abdul Halim Abdul Rahman (GS)	Zuraidin Abdullah	PAS	Ahmad Anuar Hussin	UMNO	Ali Abdu Rahman Hasan	Amanah	—N/a	—N/a
N15	Gual Periok	Mohamad Awang (GS)	Mohamad Awang	PAS	Ghazali Ismail	UMNO	Mohd Ridzuan Muhamad	Amanah	—N/a	—N/a
N16	Apam Putra (previously known as Bukit Tuku)	Abdul Rasul Mohamed (GS)	Abdul Rasul Mohamed	PAS	Akbar Salim	UMNO	Mohd Hisyamuddin Ghazali	Amanah	—N/a	—N/a
N17	Salor	Husam Musa (PH)	Saiful Adli Abu Bakar	PAS	Mohamad Noordin Awang	UMNO	Husam Musa	Amanah	—N/a	—N/a
N18	Pasir Tumboh	Abd Rahman Yunus (GS)	Abd Rahman Yunus	PAS	Bakri Yusof	UMNO	Mohd Noor Mat Yajid	Amanah	—N/a	—N/a
N19	Demit	Mumtaz Md Nawi (GS)	Mumtaz Md Nawi	PAS	Nurul Amal Mohd Fauzi	UMNO	Wan Ahmad Kamil Wan Abdullah	Amanah	—N/a	—N/a
N20	Tawang	Hassan Mohamood (GS)	Hassan Mohamood	PAS	Mohd Radzuan Abdullah	UMNO	—N/a	—N/a	—N/a	—N/a
N21	Pantai Irama (previously known as Perupok)	Mohd Huzaimy Che Husin (GS)	Mohd Huzaimy Che Husin	PAS	Ilias Husain	UMNO	Ismail Ghani	Amanah	—N/a	—N/a
N22	Jelawat	Abdul Azziz Kadir (GS)	Abdul Azziz Kadir	PAS	Mohd Radzuan Hamat	UMNO	Mohd. Fami Zakaria	Bersatu	—N/a	—N/a
N23	Melor	Md Yusnan Yusof (GS)	Md Yusnan Yusof	PAS	Azmi Ishak	UMNO	Abdul Aziz Abdul Kadir	PKR	—N/a	—N/a
N24	Kadok	Azami Mohd Nor (GS)	Azami Mohd Nor	PAS	Mohammad Azam Ismail	UMNO	Che Ibrahim Mohamad	Amanah	—N/a	—N/a
N25	Kok Lanas	Md Alwi Che Ahmad (BN)	Nik Mahadi Nik Mahmood	PAS	Md Alwi Che Ahmad	UMNO	Mohd Hanapi Ismail	Amanah	—N/a	—N/a
N26	Bukit Panau	Abdul Fattah Mahmood (GS)	Abdul Fattah Mahmood	PAS	Dayang Saniah Awang Hamid	UMNO	Hisham Fauzi	Amanah	—N/a	—N/a
N27	Gual Ipoh	Mohd. Bakri Mustapha (BN)	Wan Yusuf W Mustapha	PAS	Mohd. Bakri Mustapha	UMNO	Mohd Soba Hussin	Amanah	—N/a	—N/a
N28	Kemahang	Md Anizam Ab Rahman (GS)	Md Anizam Ab Rahman	PAS	Wan Rakemi Wan Zahari	UMNO	Bahari Mohamad Nor	PPBM	—N/a	—N/a
N29	Selising	Zulkifle Ali (BN)	Tuan Mohd Sharipudin Tuan Ismail	PAS	Zulkifle Ali	UMNO	Ismail Mohamad	PKR	—N/a	—N/a
N30	Limbongan	Mohd Nazlan Mohamed Hasbullah (GS)	Mohd Nazlan Mohamed Hasbullah	PAS	Mohd Hanafiah Abdul Aziz	UMNO	Zarir Yaakob	Amanah	—N/a	—N/a
N31	Semerak	Zawawi Othman (BN)	Wan Hassan Wan Ibrahim	PAS	Zawawi Othman	UMNO	Wan Marzudi Wan Omar	Bersatu	—N/a	—N/a
N32	Gaal	Tuan Mazlan Tuan Mat (GS)	Mohd Rodzi Ja'afar	PAS	Mohd Kaisan Ab Rahman	UMNO	Ab Rahman Yaacob	Amanah	—N/a	—N/a
N33	Pulai Chondong	Zulkifli Mamat (GS)	Azhar Salleh	PAS	Ahmad Tarmizi Ismail	UMNO	Ab Halim @ Kamaruddin Ab Kadir	Bersatu	—N/a	—N/a
N34	Temangan	Mohamed Fadzli Hassan (GS)	Mohamed Fadzli Hassan	PAS	Wan Mohd Adnan Wan Aziz	UMNO	Mohd. Redzuan Alias	PKR	—N/a	—N/a
N35	Kemuning	Mohd Roseli Ismail (GS)	Mohd Roseli Ismail	PAS	Eriandi Ismail	UMNO	Abdul Kadir Othman	Amanah	—N/a	—N/a
N36	Bukit Bunga	Mohd Adhan Kechik (BN)	Ramzi Mohd Yusoff	PAS	Mohd Adhan Kechik	UMNO	Asran Alias	Bersatu	—N/a	—N/a
N37	Air Lanas	Mustapa Mohamed (BN)	Abdullah Ya'kub	PAS	Mustapa Mohamed	UMNO	Aminuddin Yaacob	Bersatu	—N/a	—N/a
N38	Kuala Balah	Abdul Aziz Derashid (BN)	Mohd Apandi Mohamad	PAS	Abdul Aziz Derashid	UMNO	—N/a	—N/a	—N/a	—N/a
N39	Mengkebang	Ab Latiff Ab Rahman (GS)	Muhammad Mat Sulaiman	PAS	Zaki Muhamad	UMNO	Wan Mohd Azlan Wan Ahmad	Amanah	—N/a	—N/a
N40	Guchil	Mohd Roslan Puteh (PH)	Hilmi Abdullah	PAS	Zuber Hassan	UMNO	Mohd Roslan Puteh	PKR	Abd. Aziz Ahmad	IND
N41	Manek Urai	Mohd Fauzi Abdullah (GS)	Mohd Fauzi Abdullah	PAS	Suzaini Adlina Sukri	UMNO	Mohamed Dahan Mat Jali	Bersatu	Deraman Mamat	IND
N42	Dabong	Ramzi Ab Rahman (BN)	Ku Mohd Zaki Ku Hussien	PAS	Muhamad Awang	UMNO	Wan Ahmad Fadzil Wan Omar	Bersatu	—N/a	—N/a
N43	Nenggiri	Vacant	Mohd Saupi Abdul Razak	PAS	Ab Aziz Yusoff	UMNO	Othman Yusoff	PKR	—N/a	—N/a
N44	Paloh	Nozula Mat Diah (BN)	Azman Ahmad	PAS	Amran Arifin	UMNO	Noraini Husain	PKR	—N/a	—N/a
N45	Galas	Ab Aziz Yusoff (BN)	Suhaimi Mat Deris	PAS	Mohd Syahbuddin Hashim	UMNO	Nasir Dollah	DAP	—N/a	—N/a

== Election pendulum ==
The 14th General Election witnessed 37 governmental seats and 8 non-governmental seats filled the Kelantan State Legislative Assembly. The government side has 6 safe seats and 5 fairly safe seats. However, none of the non-government side has safe and fairly safe seat.

2018 Kelantan state election

GOVERNMENT SEATS
Marginal
Kota Lama	Anuar Tan Abdullah @ Tan Teng Loon	PAS	40.12
Melor	Md. Yusnan Yusof	PAS	45.69
Wakaf Bharu	Mohd. Rusli Abdullah	PAS	46.37
Kemuning	Mohd. Roseli Ismail	PAS	47.32
Apam Putra	Abdul Rasul Mohamed	PAS	47.55
Tendong	Rozi Muhamad	PAS	48.41
Semerak	Wan Hassan Wan Ibrahim	PAS	49.06
Guchil	Hilmi Abdullah	PAS	49.33
Pengkalan Kubor	Wan Roslan Wan Hamat	PAS	49.99
Bunut Payong	Ramli Mamat	PAS	50.09
Kemahang	Md. Anizam Ab. Rahman	PAS	50.65
Dabong	Ku Mohd. Zaki Ku Hussein	PAS	50.86
Gual Periok	Mohamad Awang	PAS	51.65
Pantai Irama	Mohd. Huzaimy Che Husin	PAS	52.10
Chetok	Zuraidin Abdullah	PAS	52.11
Jelawat	Abdul Azziz Kadir	PAS	52.24
Pulai Chondong	Azhar Salleh	PAS	52.26
Kadok	Azami Mohd. Nor	PAS	52.30
Gaal	Mohd. Rodzi Ja'afar	PAS	52.36
Bukit Panau	Abdul Fattah Mahmood	PAS	52.40
Salor	Saiful Adli Abu Bakar	PAS	52.46
Chempaka	Ahmad Fathan Mahmood	PAS	52.63
Temangan	Mohamed Fadzli Hassan	PAS	52.99
Limbongan	Mohd. Nazlan Mohamed Hasbullah	PAS	53.06
Pengkalan Pasir	Hanifa Ahmad	PAS	53.15
Tanjong Mas	Rohani Ibrahim	PAS	54.27
Fairly safe
Kelaboran	Mohd. Adenan Hassan	PAS	56.76
Selising	Tuan Mohd. Sharipudin Tuan Ismail	PAS	56.81
Mengkebang	Muhammad Mat Sulaiman	PAS	57.85
Kijang	Dr. Izani Husin	PAS	58.44
Tawang	Hassan Mohamood	PAS	59.02
Safe
Panchor	Nik Mohd. Amar Nik Abdullah	PAS	60.97
Manek Urai	Mohd. Fauzi Abdullah	PAS	61.26
Pasir Tumboh	Abd. Rahman Yunus	PAS	61.50
Demit	Mumtaz Md. Nawi	PAS	62.55
Pasir Pekan	Ahmad Yakob	PAS	63.88
Meranti	Mohd. Nassurruddin Daud	PAS	64.41

NON-GOVERNMENT SEATS
Marginal
Galas	Mohd. Syahbudin Hashim	UMNO	46.09
Kok Lanas	Md. Alwi Che Ahmad	UMNO	48.54
Nenggiri	Ab. Aziz Yusoff	UMNO	48.56
Air Lanas	Mustapa Mohamed	UMNO	49.16
Bukit Bunga	Mohd. Adhan Kechik	UMNO	51.54
Gual Ipoh	Bakri Mustapha	UMNO	52.84
Paloh	Amran Arifin	UMNO	53.95
Kuala Balah	Abd. Aziz Derashid	UMNO	54.26

== Results ==
Party or alliance		Votes	%	Seats	+/–
Gagasan Sejahtera	Pan-Malaysian Islamic Party	426,602	51.99	37	+6
Barisan Nasional	United Malays National Organisation	303,137	36.94	8	-4
Barisan Nasional	Malaysian Chinese Association	5,502	0.67	0	0
Barisan Nasional	Total	308,639	37.61	8	-4
Pakatan Harapan	National Trust Party	49,763	6.06	0	New
Pakatan Harapan	Malaysian United Indigenous Party	20,075	2.45	0	New
Pakatan Harapan	People's Justice Party	12,405	1.51	0	-1
Pakatan Harapan	Total	82,243	10.02	0	-1
Socialist Party of Malaysia		54	0.01	0	0
Independent		3,035	0.37	0	0
Total		820,573	100.00	45	0
Valid votes		820,573	98.53		
Invalid/blank votes		12,280	1.47		
Total votes		832,853	100.00		
Registered voters/turnout		1,049,527	79.36		
Source: SPR

=== Seats that changed allegiance ===
No.	Seat	Previous Party (2013)	Current Party (2018)
N01	(Kelantan) Pengkalan Kubor	Barisan Nasional (UMNO)	Gagasan Sejahtera (PAS)
N29	(Kelantan) Selising	Barisan Nasional (UMNO)	Gagasan Sejahtera (PAS)
N31	(Kelantan) Semerak	Barisan Nasional (UMNO)	Gagasan Sejahtera (PAS)
N40	(Kelantan) Guchil	Pakatan Harapan (PKR)	Gagasan Sejahtera (PAS)
N42	(Kelantan) Dabong	Barisan Nasional (UMNO)	Gagasan Sejahtera (PAS)

== Aftermath ==
Mustapa Mohamed, the MLA for Ayer Lanas and MP for Jeli, announced his departure from UMNO and BN on 18 September 2018, and become an independent. He later joined Bersatu, then a component party for PH, on 26 October 2018. This means that PH has its sole representation in Kelantan Assembly, up until March 2020, in the wake of 2020 Malaysian political crisis and exit of Bersatu from PH, Mustapa switched to the side of the government as PAS and Bersatu created a new coalition, Perikatan Nasional.
