= Pulai Chondong =

State constituency in Kelantan, Malaysia

Pulai Chondong (N33)
Kelantan constituency

State constituency
- Legislature: Kelantan State Legislative Assembly
MLA
Azhar Salleh
PN
- Constituency created: 1973
- First contested: 1974
- Last contested: 2023

Demographics
- Electors (2023): 28,169

Pulai Chondong is a state constituency in Kelantan, Malaysia, that has been represented in the Kelantan State Legislative Assembly.

The state constituency was first contested in 1974 and is mandated to return a single Assemblyman to the Kelantan State Legislative Assembly under the first-past-the-post voting system.

== Demographics ==
As of 2020, Pulai Chondong has a population of 33,394 people.

Ethnic breakdown of Pulai Chondong's electorate as of 2023
1. Malay (97.0%)
2. Chinese (2.67%)
3. Other ethnicities (0.33%)
4. Indian (0.04%)

== History ==
=== Polling districts ===
According to the Gazette issued on 30 March 2018, the Pulai Chondong constituency has a total of 12 polling districts.

State Constituency	Polling Districts	Code	Location
Pulai Chondong (N33）	Kampung Bandar	029/33/01	SK Bandar
Pulai Chondong (N33）	Alor Melaka	029/33/02	Maahad Syamsul Maarif (P)
Pulai Chondong (N33）	Merbau Chondong	029/33/03	SJK (C) Poey Sit
Pulai Chondong (N33）	Kedai Pulai Chondong	029/33/04	SK Pulai Chondong
Pulai Chondong (N33）	Pangkal Gong	029/33/05	SK Pangkal Gong
Pulai Chondong (N33）	Kerawang	029/33/06	SK Pangkal Nering
Pulai Chondong (N33）	Bagan	029/33/07	SK Mata Ayer
Pulai Chondong (N33）	Kampung Tok Bok	029/33/08	SMK Abdul Samad
Pulai Chondong (N33）	Joh	029/33/09	Maahad Syamsul Maarif (L)
Pulai Chondong (N33）	Labok	029/33/10	SK Tok Bok
Pulai Chondong (N33）	Kampung Binjal	029/33/11	SK Labok
Pulai Chondong (N33）	Dewan	029/33/12	SK Dewan Besar

=== Representation history ===
Members of the Legislative Assembly for Pulai Chondong
Assembly	No	Years	Member	Party
Constituency created from Machang Utara
4th	N25	1974–1978	Abdullah Muhammad	BN (UMNO)
5th	N25	1978–1982	Abdullah Muhammad	BN (UMNO)
6th	N25	1982–1986	Noor Mohammad	BN (UMNO)
7th	N27	1986–1990	Noor Mohammad	BN (UMNO)
8th	N27	1990–1995	Mohamad Noor Ahmad	S46
9th	N32	1995–1996	Mohamad Noor Ahmad	S46
9th	N32	1997–1999	Zulkifli Mamat	PAS
10th	N32	1999–2004	Zulkifli Mamat	PAS
11th	N33	2004–2008	Zulkifli Mamat	PAS
12th	N33	2008–2013	Zulkifli Mamat	PR (PAS)
13th	N33	2013–2018	Zulkifli Mamat	PR (PAS)
14th	N33	2018–2020	Azhar Salleh	PAS
14th	N33	2020–2023	Azhar Salleh	PN (PAS)
15th	N33	2023–present	Azhar Salleh	PN (PAS)

== Election results ==
Kelantan state election, 2023: Pulai Chondong
Party	Candidate	Votes	%	∆%
PAS	Azhar Salleh	11,636	67.51	▲15.25
BN	Muhammad Fakhran Che Jusoh	5,599	32.49	▼7.66
Total valid votes		17,235	100.00	
Total rejected ballots		88		
Unreturned ballots		33		
Turnout		17,356	61.61	▼21.04
Registered electors		28,169		
Majority		6,037	35.02	▲22.90
PAS hold		Swing		

Kelantan state election, 2018: Pulai Chondong
Party	Candidate	Votes	%	∆%
PAS	Azhar Salleh	9,140	52.26	▼0.58
BN	Ahmad Tarmizi Ismail	7,021	40.15	▼7.01
PKR	Ab Halim @ Kamaruddin Ab Kadir	1,328	7.59	▲7.59
Total valid votes		17,489	100.00	
Total rejected ballots		226		
Unreturned ballots		173		
Turnout		17,888	82.65	▼4.25
Registered electors		21,644		
Majority		2,119	12.12	▲6.44
PAS hold		Swing		

Kelantan state election, 2013: Pulai Chondong
Party	Candidate	Votes	%	∆%
PAS	Zulkifli Mamat	8,546	52.84	▼3.12
BN	Ab Halim Ismail	7,627	47.16	▲3.12
Total valid votes		16,173	100.00	
Total rejected ballots		179		
Unreturned ballots		51		
Turnout		16,403	86.90	▲2.32
Registered electors		18,875		
Majority		919	5.68	▼6.24
PAS hold		Swing		

Kelantan state election, 2008: Pulai Chondong
Party	Candidate	Votes	%	∆%
PAS	Zulkifli Mamat	7,205	55.96	▲5.51
BN	Mohd Asri Meiah	5,670	44.04	▼5.51
Total valid votes		12,875	100.00	
Total rejected ballots		133		
Unreturned ballots		38		
Turnout		13,046	84.58	▲2.43
Registered electors		15,425		
Majority		1,535	11.92	▲11.02
PAS hold		Swing		

Kelantan state election, 2004: Pulai Chondong
Party	Candidate	Votes	%	∆%
PAS	Zulkifli Mamat	5,866	50.45	▼10.23
BN	Ab Halim Ismail	5,761	49.55	▲10.23
Total valid votes		11,627	100.00	
Total rejected ballots		131		
Unreturned ballots		0		
Turnout		11,758	82.15	▲3.10
Registered electors		14,312		
Majority		105	0.90	▼20.46
PAS hold		Swing		

Kelantan state election, 1999: Pulai Chondong
Party	Candidate	Votes	%	∆%
PAS	Zulkifli Mamat	6,583	60.68	▲60.68
BN	Arifin Mamat	4,265	39.32	▼2.88
Total valid votes		10,848	100.00	
Total rejected ballots		229		
Unreturned ballots		12		
Turnout		11,089	79.05	▲3.16
Registered electors		14,027		
Majority		2,318	21.36	▲5.76
PAS hold		Swing		

Malaysian general by-election, 6 January 1997 upon the death of incumbent Noor Ahmad
Party	Candidate	Votes	%	∆%
PAS	Noor Ahmad	4,778	50.20	▲50.20
BN	Hussein Ahmad	4,660	48.96	▲9.26
Total valid votes		9,438	100.00	
Total rejected ballots		80		
Unreturned ballots		0		
Turnout		9,518	75.40	▼3.65
Registered electors		12,635		
Majority		118	1.24	▼91.9
PAS gain from S46		Swing		?

Kelantan state election, 1995: Pulai Chondong
Party	Candidate	Votes	%	∆%
S46	Mohamad Noor Ahmad	5,415	57.80	▼9.09
BN	Nooruddin Hassan	3,954	42.20	▲9.29
Total valid votes		9,369	100.00	
Total rejected ballots		200		
Unreturned ballots		27		
Turnout		9,596	75.89	▼3.89
Registered electors		12,645		
Majority		1,461	15.60	▼18.58
S46 hold		Swing		

Kelantan state election, 1990: Pulai Chondong
Party	Candidate	Votes	%	∆%
S46	Mohamad Noor Ahmad	5,083	67.09	▲67.09
BN	Abdullah Mohamed	2,493	32.91	▼27.31
Total valid votes		7,576	100.00	
Total rejected ballots		232		
Unreturned ballots		0		
Turnout		7,808	79.78	▲0.25
Registered electors		9,787		
Majority		2,590	34.18	▲13.74
S46 gain from BN		Swing		?

Kelantan state election, 1986: Pulai Chondong
Party	Candidate	Votes	%	∆%
BN	Abdullah Mohamed	4,249	60.22	▲2.87
PAS	Mustapha Yahya	2,807	39.78	▼2.87
Total valid votes		7,056	100.00	
Total rejected ballots		171		
Unreturned ballots		0		
Turnout		7,227	79.53	▼5.61
Registered electors		9,087		
Majority		1,442	20.44	▲5.75
BN hold		Swing		

Kelantan state election, 1982: Pulai Chondong
Party	Candidate	Votes	%	∆%
BN	Abdullah Mohamed	4,442	57.35	▼7.57
PAS	Arshad Mamat	3,304	42.65	▲17.33
Total valid votes		7,746	100.00	
Total rejected ballots		142		
Unreturned ballots		0		
Turnout		7,888	85.14	▲2.83
Registered electors		9,265		
Majority		1,138	14.69	▼24.90
BN hold		Swing		

Kelantan state election, 1978: Pulai Chondong
Party	Candidate	Votes	%	∆%
BN	Abdullah Mohamed	4,268	64.91	▼11.78
PAS	Yahya Othman	1,665	25.32	▲25.32
Independent	Hamzah Salleh	642	9.76	▼13.54
Total valid votes		6,575	100.00	
Total rejected ballots		36		
Unreturned ballots		0		
Turnout		6,611	82.31	▼2.26
Registered electors		8,032		
Majority		2,603	39.59	▼13.80
BN hold		Swing		

Kelantan state election, 1974: Pulai Chondong
Party	Candidate	Votes	%
BN	Abdullah Mohamed	4,587	76.69
Independent	Abdul Shukor Yaakob	1,394	23.31
Total valid votes		5,981	100.00
Total rejected ballots		392	
Unreturned ballots		0	
Turnout		6,373	84.57
Registered electors		7,536	
Majority		3,193	53.39
This was a new constituency created.
