= Dabong (state constituency) =

State constituency in Kelantan, Malaysia

Coordinates: 5.3833318°N 102.0166666°E

Dabong (N42)
Kelantan constituency

State constituency
- Legislature: Kelantan State Legislative Assembly
MLA
Ku Mohd Zaki Ku Hussin
PN
- Constituency created: 1986
- First contested: 1986
- Last contested: 2023

Demographics
- Electors (2023): 15,255

Dabong is a state constituency in Kelantan, Malaysia, that has been represented in the Kelantan State Legislative Assembly.

The state constituency was first contested in 1986 and is mandated to return a single Assemblyman to the Kelantan State Legislative Assembly under the first-past-the-post voting system.

== Demographics ==
Ethnic breakdown of Dabong's electorate as of 2023
1. Malay (98.6%)
2. Other ethnicities (1.05%)
3. Indian (0.22%)
4. Chinese (0.09%)

== History ==
=== Polling districts ===
According to the Gazette issued on 30 March 2018, the Dabong constituency has a total of 12 polling districts.

State Constituency	Polling Districts	Code	Location
Dabong (N42)	Kandek	031/42/01	SMA (Arab) Nurul Ihsan
Dabong (N42)	Kuala Gris	031/42/02	SK Kuala Geris
Dabong (N42)	Dabong	031/42/03	SMK Dabong
Dabong (N42)	Jelawang	031/42/04	SK Mempelam Jelawang
Dabong (N42)	Kemubu	031/42/05	SK Kemubu
Dabong (N42)	Bintang	031/42/06	SK Seri Mahligai
Dabong (N42)	Bukit Abu	031/42/07	Dewan Ladang Bukit Abu
Dabong (N42)	Temiang	031/42/08	SK Slow Temiang
Dabong (N42)	Kampung Sungai Mel	031/42/09	SK Sungai Mengkuang
Dabong (N42)	Pemberian	031/42/10	SK Pemberian
Dabong (N42)	Olak Jeram	031/42/11	SK Sg Sam
Dabong (N42)	Biak	031/42/12	SK Biak

=== Representation History ===
Members of the Legislative Assembly for Dabong
Assembly	No	Years	Member	Party
Constituency created from Ulu Kelantan Timor
7th	N37	1986–1990	Mohd Razali Ishak	BN (UMNO)
8th	N37	1990–1995	Mohd Razali Ishak	S46
9th	N41	1995–1996	Mohd Razali Ishak	S46
9th	N41	1996–1999	Mohd Razali Ishak	BN (UMNO)
10th	N41	1999–2004	Abdul Ghafar Yusoff	PAS
11th	N42	2004–2008	Ramzi Ab Rahman	BN (UMNO)
12th	N42	2008–2013	Mohd Asri Ibrahim	PR (PAS)
13th	N42	2013–2018	Ramzi Ab Rahman	BN (UMNO)
14th	N42	2018–2020	Ku Mohd Zaki Ku Hussien	PAS
14th	N42	2020–2023	Ku Mohd Zaki Ku Hussien	PN (PAS)
15th	N42	2023–present	Ku Mohd Zaki Ku Hussien	PN (PAS)

== Election results ==
Kelantan state election, 2023
Party	Candidate	Votes	%	∆%
PAS	Ku Mohd Zaki Ku Hussin	5,772	63.44	▲12.58
BN	Ahmad Firdaus Mohamad	3,326	36.56	▼8.03
Total valid votes		9,098	100.00	
Total rejected ballots		106		
Unreturned ballots		39		
Turnout		9,243	60.59	▼20.71
Registered electors		15,255		
Majority		2,446	26.88	▲20.61
PAS hold		Swing		

Kelantan state election, 2018
Party	Candidate	Votes	%	∆%
PAS	Ku Mohd Zaki Ku Hussin	4,778	50.86	▲2.13
BN	Muhamad Awang	4,189	44.59	▼6.68
PKR	Wan Ahamad Fadzil Wan Omar	427	4.55	▲4.55
Total valid votes		9,394	100.00	
Total rejected ballots		190		
Unreturned ballots		49		
Turnout		9,633	81.30	▼6.10
Registered electors		11,848		
Majority		589	6.27	▲3.73
PAS gain from BN		Swing		?

Kelantan state election, 2013
Party	Candidate	Votes	%	∆%
BN	Ramzi Ab Rahman	4,612	51.27	▲5.07
PAS	Ku Mohd Zaki Ku Hussin	4,383	48.73	▼5.07
Total valid votes		8,995	100.00	
Total rejected ballots		138		
Unreturned ballots		11		
Turnout		9,144	87.40	▲2.19
Registered electors		10,460		
Majority		229	2.54	▼5.06
BN gain from PAS		Swing		?

Kelantan state election, 2008
Party	Candidate	Votes	%	∆%
PAS	Mohd Asri Ibrahim	3,906	53.80	▲13.17
BN	Ramzi Ab Rahman	3,354	46.20	▼13.17
Total valid votes		7,260	100.00	
Total rejected ballots		150		
Unreturned ballots		9		
Turnout		7,419	85.21	▲1.90
Registered electors		8,707		
Majority		552	7.60	▼11.14
PAS gain from BN		Swing		?

Kelantan state election, 2004
Party	Candidate	Votes	%	∆%
BN	Ramzi Ab Rahman	3,466	59.37	▲14.42
PAS	Abdul Ghafar Yusoff	2,372	40.63	▼14.42
Total valid votes		5,838	100.00	
Total rejected ballots		88		
Unreturned ballots		0		
Turnout		5,926	83.31	▲5.72
Registered electors		7,113		
Majority		1,094	18.74	▲8.64
BN gain from PAS		Swing		?

Kelantan state election, 1999
Party	Candidate	Votes	%	∆%
PAS	Abdul Ghafar Yusoff	3,167	55.05	▲55.05
BN	Mohd Razali Ishak	2,586	44.95	▲3.09
Total valid votes		5,753	100.00	
Total rejected ballots		206		
Unreturned ballots		0		
Turnout		5,959	77.59	▼0.99
Registered electors		7,680		
Majority		581	10.10	▼6.18
PAS gain from S46		Swing		?

Kelantan state election, 1995
Party	Candidate	Votes	%	∆%
S46	Mohd Razali Ishak	3,170	58.14	▼23.28
BN	Ariffin Said	2,282	41.86	▲23.28
Total valid votes		5,452	100.00	
Total rejected ballots		225		
Unreturned ballots		46		
Turnout		5,723	78.58	▼4.46
Registered electors		7,283		
Majority		888	16.28	▼46.56
S46 hold		Swing		

Kelantan state election, 1990
Party	Candidate	Votes	%	∆%
S46	Mohd Razali Ishak	5,922	81.42	▲81.42
BN	Hamad Mat Jaih	1,351	18.58	▼39.41
Total valid votes		7,273	100.00	
Total rejected ballots		123		
Unreturned ballots		0		
Turnout		7,396	83.04	▲2.13
Registered electors		8,907		
Majority		4,571	62.84	▲46.86
S46 gain from BN		Swing		?

Kelantan state election, 1986
Party	Candidate	Votes	%
BN	Mohd Razali Ishak	3,410	57.99
PAS	Abd Razak	2,470	42.01
Total valid votes		5,880	100.00
Total rejected ballots		214	
Unreturned ballots		0	
Turnout		6,094	80.91
Registered electors		7,532	
Majority		940	15.98
This was a new constituency created.
