= Gaal (state constituency) =

Electoral district in Kelantan, Malaysia

Gaal (N32)
Kelantan constituency

State constituency
- Legislature: Kelantan State Legislative Assembly
MLA
Mohd Rodzi Ja'afar
PN
- Constituency created: 1985
- First contested: 1986
- Last contested: 2023

Demographics
- Electors (2023): 22,671

Gaal is a state constituency in Kelantan, Malaysia, that has been represented in the Kelantan State Legislative Assembly.

The state constituency was first contested in 1986 and is mandated to return a single Assemblyman to the Kelantan State Legislative Assembly under the first-past-the-post voting system.

== Demographics ==
As of 2020, Gaal has a population of 23,896 people.

Ethnic breakdown of Gaal's electorate as of 2023
1. Malay (98.6%)
2. Other ethnicities (1.07%)
3. Chinese (0.30%)
4. Indian (0.02%)

== History ==
=== Polling districts ===
According to the gazette issued on 30 March 2018, the Gaal constituency has a total of 12 polling districts.

State Constituency	Polling Districts	Code	Location
Gaal (N32)	Temila	028/32/01	Maahad Saniah Pasir Puteh
Gaal (N32)	Jeram	028/32/02	SK Jeram
Gaal (N32)	Telipok	028/32/03	SMK Jeram
Gaal (N32)	Telosan	028/32/04	SK Telosan
Gaal (N32)	Gong Garu	028/32/05	SK Gong Garu
Gaal (N32)	Batu Hitam	028/32/06	SK Changgai
Gaal (N32)	Gaal	028/32/07	SMK Gaal
Gaal (N32)	Gong Datuk	028/32/08	SK Gaal
Gaal (N32)	Kandis	028/32/09	SK Kampong Kandis
Gaal (N32)	Bukit Yong	028/32/10	SMU (A) Nurul Huda
Gaal (N32)	Gong Nangka	028/32/11	SK Wakaf Raja
Gaal (N32)	Bukit Awang	028/32/12	SK Bukit Awang

=== Representation history ===
Members of the Legislative Assembly for Gaal
Assembly	No	Years	Member	Party
Constituency created from Selinsing
7th	N24	1986–1990	Daud Yusoff	BN (UMNO)
8th	N24	1990–1995	Mohammad Husain	PAS
9th	N31	1995–1999	Alwi Jusoh	PAS
10th	N31	1999–2004	Nik Mazian Nik Mohamad	PAS
11th	N32	2004–2008	Nik Mazian Nik Mohamad	PAS
12th	N32	2008–2013	Nik Mazian Nik Mohamad	PR (PAS)
13th	N32	2013–2018	Tuan Mazlan Tuan Mat	PR (PAS)
14th	N32	2018–2020	Mohd Rodzi Ja'afar	PAS
14th	N32	2020–2023	Mohd Rodzi Ja'afar	PN (PAS)
15th	N32	2023–present	Mohd Rodzi Ja'afar	PN (PAS)

== Election results ==
Kelantan state election, 2023
Party	Candidate	Votes	%	∆%
PAS	Mohd Rodzi Ja'afar	10,388	72.65	▲20.29
BN	Mohd Aliff Nasir Mt Nasin	3,911	27.35	▼14.05
Total valid votes		14,299	100.00	
Total rejected ballots		107		
Unreturned ballots		15		
Turnout		14,428	63.64	▼19.24
Registered electors		22,671		
Majority		6,477	45.30	▲34.34
PAS hold		Swing		

Kelantan state election, 2018
Party	Candidate	Votes	%	∆%
PAS	Mohd Rodzi Ja'afar	7,533	52.36	▲1.29
BN	Mohd Kaisan Ab Rahman	5,956	41.40	▼7.53
PKR	Ab Rahman Yaacob	897	6.24	▲6.24
Total valid votes		14,386	100.00	
Total rejected ballots		177		
Unreturned ballots		143		
Turnout		14,706	82.88	▼5.52
Registered electors		17,744		
Majority		1,577	10.96	▲8.82
PAS hold		Swing		

Kelantan state election, 2013
Party	Candidate	Votes	%	∆%
PAS	Tuan Mazlan Tuan Mat	7,178	51.07	▼0.33
BN	Redzuan Stapha	6,876	48.93	▲0.33
Total valid votes		14,054	100.00	
Total rejected ballots		149		
Unreturned ballots		31		
Turnout		14,234	88.40	▲3.58
Registered electors		16,105		
Majority		302	2.14	▼0.66
PAS hold		Swing		

Kelantan state election, 2008
Party	Candidate	Votes	%	∆%
PAS	Nik Mazian Nik Mohamad	5,941	51.40	▲1.18
BN	Tuan Mustaffa Tuan Mat	5,618	48.60	▼1.18
Total valid votes		11,559	100.00	
Total rejected ballots		153		
Unreturned ballots		20		
Turnout		11,732	84.82	▲1.41
Registered electors		13,832		
Majority		323	2.80	▲2.36
PAS hold		Swing		

Kelantan state election, 2004
Party	Candidate	Votes	%	∆%
PAS	Nik Mazian Nik Mohamad	4,969	50.22	▼10.39
BN	Tuan Mustaffa Tuan Mat	4,926	49.78	▲11.16
Total valid votes		9,895	100.00	
Total rejected ballots		157		
Unreturned ballots		17		
Turnout		10,069	83.41	▲5.46
Registered electors		12,071		
Majority		43	0.44	▼21.55
PAS hold		Swing		

Kelantan state election, 1999
Party	Candidate	Votes	%	∆%
PAS	Nik Mazian Nik Mohamad	5,720	60.61	▲3.61
BN	Ab. Rahman Yaacob	3,645	38.62	▼3.78
KITA	Mohd Asri Mejah	72	0.77	▲0.17
Total valid votes		9,437	100.00	
Total rejected ballots		199		
Unreturned ballots		7		
Turnout		9,643	77.95	▲0.79
Registered electors		12,371		
Majority		2,075	21.99	▲7.39
PAS hold		Swing		

Kelantan state election, 1995
Party	Candidate	Votes	%	∆%
PAS	Alwi Jusoh	5,168	57.00	▼10.04
BN	Ismail Muhamad	3,844	42.40	▲10.85
KITA	Abdullah Sani Musa	54	0.60	▲0.60
Total valid votes		9,066	100.00	
Total rejected ballots		186		
Unreturned ballots		23		
Turnout		9,275	77.16	▼3.40
Registered electors		12,020		
Majority		1,324	14.60	▼20.89
PAS hold		Swing		

Kelantan state election, 1990
Party	Candidate	Votes	%	∆%
PAS	Mohammad Husain	5,806	67.04	▲19.80
BN	Daud Yusoff	2,732	31.55	▼21.21
Independent	Mohamad Che Tong	122	1.41	▲1.41
Total valid votes		8,660	100.00	
Total rejected ballots		215		
Unreturned ballots		0		
Turnout		8,875	80.56	▲2.57
Registered electors		11,016		
Majority		3,074	35.49	▲29.97
PAS gain from BN		Swing		?

Kelantan state election, 1986
Party	Candidate	Votes	%
BN	Daud Yusoff	4,103	52.76
PAS	Musa Salleh	3,674	47.24
Total valid votes		7,777	100.00
Total rejected ballots		250	
Unreturned ballots		0	
Turnout		8,027	77.99
Registered electors		10,293	
Majority		429	5.52
This was a new constituency created.
