= Pantai Irama =

Pantai Irama (N21)
Kelantan constituency

State constituency
- Legislature: Kelantan State Legislative Assembly
MLA
Mohd Huzaimy Che Husin
PN
- Constituency created: 2018
- First contested: 2018
- Last contested: 2023

Demographics
- Electors (2023): 40,512

Pantai Irama is a state constituency in Kelantan, Malaysia, that has been represented in the Kelantan State Legislative Assembly.

The state constituency was first contested in 2018 and is mandated to return a single Assemblyman to the Kelantan State Legislative Assembly under the first-past-the-post voting system.

== Demographics ==
As of 2020, Pantai Irama has a population of 55,583 people.

Ethnic breakdown of Pantai Irama's electorate as of 2023
1. Malay (97.4%)
2. Chinese (1.44%)
3. Other ethnicities (1.09%)
4. Indian (0.04%)

== History ==
=== Polling districts ===
According to the Gazette issued on 30 March 2018, the Pantai Irama constituency has a total of 16 polling districts.

State Constituency	Polling Districts	Code	Location
Pantai Irama (N21）	Kubang Golok	025/21/01	SK Kubang Golok
Pantai Irama (N21）	Perupok	025/21/02	SK Perupok
Pantai Irama (N21）	Kampung Sungai	025/21/03	SMK Bachok
Pantai Irama (N21）	Pantai Damat	025/21/04	SK Bachok
Pantai Irama (N21）	Kampung Kemudi	025/21/05	SK Seri Kemudi
Pantai Irama (N21）	Kampung Nipah	025/21/06	SMK Nipah
Pantai Irama (N21）	Pantai Irama	025/21/07	Dewan Majlis Daerah Bachok
Pantai Irama (N21）	Padang China	025/21/08	SMK Badak
Pantai Irama (N21）	Kuau	025/21/09	SK Badak
Pantai Irama (N21）	Badak	025/21/10	SMK Badak
Pantai Irama (N21）	Melawi	025/21/11	SK Tangok
Pantai Irama (N21）	Kampung Sungai Dua	025/21/12	SK Sungai Dua
Pantai Irama (N21）	Tangok	025/21/13	SMK Dato' Perdana
Pantai Irama (N21）	Rusa	025/21/14	SMA Tok Bachok
Pantai Irama (N21）	Telong	025/21/15	SMK Kanids
Pantai Irama (N21）	Kandis	025/21/16	SK Kandis

=== Representation history ===
Members of the Legislative Assembly for Pantai Irama
Assembly	No	Years	Member	Party
Constituency created from Perupok
14th	N21	2018–2020	Mohd Huzaimy Che Hussin	PAS
14th	N21	2020–2023	Mohd Huzaimy Che Hussin	PN (PAS)
15th	N21	2023–present	Mohd Huzaimy Che Hussin	PN (PAS)

== Election results ==
Kelantan state election, 2023: Pantai Irama
Party	Candidate	Votes	%	∆%
PAS	Mohd Huzaimy Che Husin	17,779	70.81	▲18.71
BN	Zakiah Md Noor	7,330	29.19	▼12.84
Total valid votes		25,109	100.00	
Total rejected ballots		204		
Unreturned ballots		31		
Turnout		25,344	62.56	▼19.78
Registered electors		40,512		
Majority		10,449	41.62	▲31.55
PAS hold		Swing		

Kelantan state election, 2018: Pantai Irama
Party	Candidate	Votes	%
PAS	Mohd Huzaimy Che Husin	12,827	52.10
BN	Ilias Husain	10,348	42.03
PKR	Ismail Ghani	1,445	5.87
Total valid votes		24,620	100.00
Total rejected ballots		383	
Unreturned ballots		290	
Turnout		25,293	82.34
Registered electors		30,719	
Majority		2,479	10.07
This was a new seat created.
