= Apam Putra =

State constituency in Kelantan, Malaysia

Apam Putra (N16)
Kelantan constituency

State constituency
- Legislature: Kelantan State Legislative Assembly
MLA
Zamakhshari Mohamad
PN
- Constituency created: 2018
- First contested: 2018
- Last contested: 2023

Demographics
- Electors (2023): 28,834

Apam Putra is a state constituency in Kelantan, Malaysia, that has been represented in the Kelantan State Legislative Assembly.

The state constituency was first contested in 2018 and is mandated to return a single Assemblyman to the Kelantan State Legislative Assembly under the first-past-the-post voting system.

== Demographics ==
As of 2020, Apam Putra has a population of 42,189 people.

Ethnic breakdown of Apam Putra's electorate as of 2023
1. Malay (97.8%)
2. Other ethnicities (1.78%)
3. Chinese (0.31%)
4. Indian (0.09%)

== History ==
=== Polling districts ===
According to the Gazette issued on 30 March 2018, the Apam Putra constituency has a total of 13 polling districts.

State Constituency	Polling Districts	Code	Location
Apam Putra（N16）	Lubok Tapah	023/16/01	SK Lati
Apam Putra（N16）	Nibong	023/16/02	SMK To' Uban
Apam Putra（N16）	Pengkalan Machang	023/16/03	SK To' Uban
Apam Putra（N16）	Kampung Bujok	023/16/04	SK Bukit Jarum
Apam Putra（N16）	Repek	023/16/05	SK Sri Kiambang
Apam Putra（N16）	Lati	023/16/06	SMA Lati
Apam Putra（N16）	Chicha Tinggi	023/16/07	SK Chicha Tinggi
Apam Putra（N16）	Cherang Hangus	023/16/08	SK Kampong Baru
Apam Putra（N16）	Taman	023/16/09	SMK Sri Kiambang
Apam Putra（N16）	Batu Karang	023/16/10	SMU (A) Darul Saadah
Apam Putra（N16）	Bukit Tuku	023/16/11	SK Bukit Perah
Apam Putra（N16）	Baroh Pial	023/16/12	SK Baroh Pial
Apam Putra（N16）	Chandan	023/16/13	SMA (Arab) Al-Balaghul Mubin

=== Representation history ===
Members of the Legislative Assembly for Apam Putra
Assembly	No	Years	Member	Party
Constituency created from Bukit Tuku
14th	N16	2018–2020	Abdul Rasul Mohamed	PAS
14th	N16	2020–2023	Abdul Rasul Mohamed	PN (PAS)
15th	N16	2023–present	Zamakhshari Mohamad	PN (PAS)

== Election results ==
Kelantan state election, 2023: Apam Putra
Party	Candidate	Votes	%	∆%
PAS	Zamakhshari Mohamad	10,606	61.12	▲13.57
BN	Akbar Salim	6,747	38.88	▼6.35
Total valid votes		17,353	100.00	
Total rejected ballots		148		
Unreturned ballots		19		
Turnout		17,520	60.76	▼16.37
Registered electors		28,834		
Majority		3,859	22.24	▲19.92
PAS hold		Swing		

Kelantan state election, 2018: Apam Putra
Party	Candidate	Votes	%
PAS	Abdul Rasul Muhamed	7,134	47.55
BN	Akbar Salim	6,786	45.23
PKR	Mohd Hisyamuddin Ghazali	1,082	7.21
Total valid votes		15,002	100.00
Total rejected ballots		214	
Unreturned ballots		148	
Turnout		15,364	77.13
Registered electors		19,920	
Majority		348	2.32
This was a new constituency created.
