= Menteri Besar of Kelantan =

Head of government of Kelantan

- Coat Of Arms

- Flag of Menteri Besar

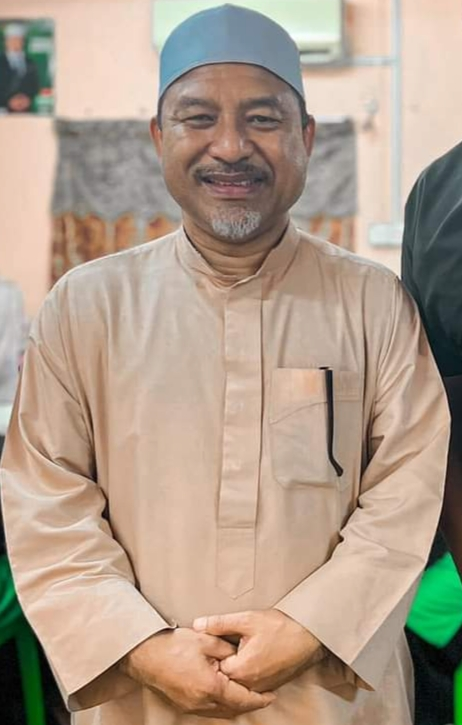
- Incumbent; Mohd Nassuruddin Daud since 15 August 2023
- Government of Kelantan
- Style: Yang Amat Berhormat (The Most Honourable)
- Member of: Kelantan State Executive Council
- Reports to: Kelantan State Legislative Assembly
- Residence: JKR 10, Bangunan Perbadanan Menteri Besar Kelantan, Kampung Sireh, Kota Bharu, Kelantan
- Seat: Tingkat 1, Blok 1, Kota Darul Naim, 15502 Kota Bharu, Kelantan
- Appointer: Muhammad V; Sultan of Kelantan
- Term length: 5 years or lesser, renewable once (while commanding the confidence of the Kelantan State Legislative Assembly With State Elections held no more than five years apart)
- Inaugural holder: Long Abdul Ghafar
- Formation: 1775; 251 years ago
- Deputy: Mohamed Fadzli Hassan
- Website: www.kelantan.gov.my/index.php/ms/kerajaan/menteri-besar-kelantan

The Menteri Besar of Kelantan or Chief Minister of Kelantan is the head of government in the Malaysian state of Kelantan. According to convention, the Menteri Besar is the leader of the largest party or coalition in the Kelantan State Legislative Assembly.

The 19th Menteri Besar of Kelantan has been Mohd Nassuruddin Daud since 15 August 2023.

== Appointment ==
According to the state constitution, the Sultan of Kelantan shall first appoint the Menteri Besar to preside over the Executive Council and requires such Menteri Besar to be a member of the Legislative Assembly who in his judgment is likely to command the confidence of the majority of the members of the Assembly, must be an ethnic Malay who professes the religion of Islam and must not a Malaysian citizen by naturalisation or by registration. The Sultan on the Menteri Besar's advice shall appoint not more than ten nor less than four members from among the members of the Legislative Assembly.

The member of the Executive Council must take and subscribe in the presence of the Sultan the oath of office and allegiance as well as the oath of secrecy before they can exercise the functions of office. The Executive Council shall be collectively responsible to the Legislative Assembly. The members of the Executive Council shall not hold any office of profit and engage in any trade, business or profession that will cause conflict of interest.

If a government cannot get its appropriation (budget) legislation passed by the Legislative Assembly, or the Legislative Assembly passes a vote of "no confidence" in the government, the Menteri Besar is bound by convention to resign immediately. The Sultan's choice of replacement Menteri Besar will be dictated by the circumstances. A member of the Executive Council other than the Menteri Besar shall hold office during the pleasure of the Sultan, unless the appointment of any member of the Executive Council shall have been revoked by the Sultan on the advice of the Menteri Besar but may at any time resign his office.

Following a resignation in other circumstances, defeated in an election or the death of the Menteri Besar, the Sultan will generally appoint as Menteri Besar the person voted by the governing party as their new leader.

== Powers ==
The power of the Menteri Besar is subject to a number of limitations. Menteri Besar removed as leader of his or her party, or whose government loses a vote of no confidence in the Legislative Assembly, must advise a state election or resign the office or be dismissed by the Sultan. The defeat of a supply bill (one that concerns the spending of money) or unable to pass important policy-related legislation is seen to require the resignation of the government or dissolution of Legislative Assembly, much like a non-confidence vote, since a government that cannot spend money is hamstrung, also called loss of supply.

The Menteri Besar's party will normally have a majority in the Legislative Assembly and party discipline is exceptionally strong in Kelantan politics, so passage of the government's legislation through the Legislative Assembly is mostly a formality.

== Caretaker Menteri Besar ==
The legislative assembly unless sooner dissolved by the Sultan with His Majesty's own discretion on the advice of the Menteri Besar shall continue for five years from the date of its first meeting. The state constitution permits a delay of 60 days of general election to be held from the date of dissolution and the legislative assembly shall be summoned to meet on a date not later than 120 days from the date of dissolution. Conventionally, between the dissolution of one legislative assembly and the convening of the next, the Menteri Besar and the executive council remain in office in a caretaker capacity.

== List of Menteris Besar of Kelantan ==
The following is the list of Menteris Besar of Kelantan since 1775:

Colour key (for political parties):
UMNO Parti Negara Alliance / Barisan Nasional PMIP/PAS APU BA PR GS PN

No.	Portrait	Name (Birth–Death) Constituency	Term of office			Party (Note: This column names only the Menteri Besar's party. The state government he heads may be a complex coalition of several parties and independents; those are not listed here.)	Election	Assembly
No.	Portrait	Name (Birth–Death) Constituency	Took office	Left office	Time in office	Party	Election	Assembly
1		Long Abdul Ghafar	1775	1794		None	–	–
2		Wan Mahmud Wan Ibrahim	1800	1835		None	–	–
3		Tuan Besar Raja Muda Ismail	1835	1839		None	–	–
4		Long Zainal Abidin Long Abdul Ghafar	1839	1851		None	–	–
5		Nik Abdul Majid Nik Yusoff	1851	1885		None	–	–
6		Nik Yusof Nik Abdul Majid	1886	1890		None	–	–
7		Saad Ngah	1890	1894		None	–	–
8		Nik Yusof Nik Abdul Majid	1894	1900		None	–	–
9		Hassan Mohd Salleh	1900	1920		None	–	–
10		Nik Mahmud Nik Ismail (1882–1964)	30 April 1921	27 December 1944	23 years, 242 days	None	–	–
11		Nik Ahmad Kamil (1909–1977)	27 December 1944	1953		None	–	–
11		Nik Ahmad Kamil (1909–1977)	27 December 1944	1953		UMNO	–	–
11		Nik Ahmad Kamil (1909–1977)	27 December 1944	1953		IMP	–	–
11		Nik Ahmad Kamil (1909–1977)	27 December 1944	1953		Parti Negara	–	–
12		Tengku Muhammad Hamzah Tengku Zainal Abidin (1909–1962)	1953	1959		Alliance (UMNO)	–	–
13		Ishak Lotfi Omar (1916–1992); MLA for Kota Bharu Selatan	1959	1964		PMIP	1959	1st
14		Dato'; Asri Muda (1923–1992); MLA for Kota Bharu Tengah	1964	1973		PMIP	1964	2nd
14		Dato'; Asri Muda (1923–1992); MLA for Kota Bharu Tengah	1964	1973		PMIP	1969	3rd
15		Dato'; Mohamed Nasir (1916–1997); MLA for Tendong	1974	November; 1977		BN (PAS)	1974	4th
16		Dato'; Mohamed Yaacob (1926–2009); MLA for Lanas (until 1986); MLA for Panglima Bayu (from 1986)	23 March 1978	22 October 1990	12 years, 214 days	BN (UMNO)	1978	5th
16		Dato'; Mohamed Yaacob (1926–2009); MLA for Lanas (until 1986); MLA for Panglima Bayu (from 1986)	23 March 1978	22 October 1990	12 years, 214 days	BN (UMNO)	1982	6th
16		Dato'; Mohamed Yaacob (1926–2009); MLA for Lanas (until 1986); MLA for Panglima Bayu (from 1986)	23 March 1978	22 October 1990	12 years, 214 days	BN (UMNO)	1986	7th
17		Dato'; Nik Abdul Aziz Nik Mat (1931–2015); MLA for Semut Api (until 1995); MLA for Chempaka (from 1995)	22 October 1990	6 May 2013	22 years, 197 days	APU (PAS)	1990	8th
17		Dato'; Nik Abdul Aziz Nik Mat (1931–2015); MLA for Semut Api (until 1995); MLA for Chempaka (from 1995)	22 October 1990	6 May 2013	22 years, 197 days	APU (PAS)	1995	9th
17		Dato'; Nik Abdul Aziz Nik Mat (1931–2015); MLA for Semut Api (until 1995); MLA for Chempaka (from 1995)	22 October 1990	6 May 2013	22 years, 197 days	BA (PAS)	1999	10th
17		Dato'; Nik Abdul Aziz Nik Mat (1931–2015); MLA for Semut Api (until 1995); MLA for Chempaka (from 1995)	22 October 1990	6 May 2013	22 years, 197 days	BA (PAS)	2004	11th
17		Dato'; Nik Abdul Aziz Nik Mat (1931–2015); MLA for Semut Api (until 1995); MLA for Chempaka (from 1995)	22 October 1990	6 May 2013	22 years, 197 days	PR (PAS)	2008	12th
18		Dato'; Ahmad Yakob (born 1950); MLA for Pasir Pekan	6 May 2013	15 August 2023	10 years, 102 days	PR (PAS)	2013	13th
18		Dato'; Ahmad Yakob (born 1950); MLA for Pasir Pekan	6 May 2013	15 August 2023	10 years, 102 days	GS (PAS)	2018	14th
18		Dato'; Ahmad Yakob (born 1950); MLA for Pasir Pekan	6 May 2013	15 August 2023	10 years, 102 days	PN (PAS)	2018	14th
19		Dato'; Mohd Nassuruddin Daud (born 1965); MLA for Meranti	15 August 2023	Incumbent	3 years, 92 days	PN (PAS)	2023	15th

== Living former Menteri Besar ==
Name	Term of office	Date of birth
Ahmad Yakob	2013–2023	1 February 1950 (age 76)
