= Kelantan State Legislative Assembly =

Unicameral state legislature of Kelantan, Malaysia

Kelantan State Legislative Assembly Dewan Negeri Kelantan ديوان نݢري کلنتن
- 15th Kelantan State Legislative Assembly

Type
- Type: Unicameral

History
- Founded: 1959

Leadership
- Sultan: Sultan Muhammad V since 13 September 2010
- Speaker: Mohd Amar Abdullah, PN-PAS since 5 September 2023
- Deputy Speaker: Mohamed Farid Mohamed Zawawi, PN-WAWASAN since 5 September 2023
- Menteri Besar: Mohd Nassuruddin Daud, PN-PAS since 15 August 2023
- Opposition Leader: Mohd Syahbuddin Hashim, BN–UMNO since 5 September 2023
- Secretary: Mohd Zaika Yamani Ibrahim

Structure
- Seats: 45; Quorum: 15; Simple majority: 23; Two-thirds majority: 30
- Political groups: (As of 11 May 2026) Government (42); PN (42): PAS (37); BERSATU (4); WAWASAN (1); Opposition (3); BN (2): UMNO (2); PH (1): AMANAH (1); Speaker (1); PN (MLA for Panchor)
- Committees: 2: Public Accounts Committee; Select Committee

Elections
- Voting system: Plurality: First-past-the-post (45 single-member constituencies)
- Last election: 12 August 2023
- Next election: By 4 November 2028

Meeting place
- Kota Darul Naim, Kota Bharu, Kelantan

Website
- dewan.kelantan.gov.my

The Kelantan State Legislative Assembly (Malay: Dewan Negeri Kelantan) is the unicameral state legislature of the Malaysian state of Kelantan. It consists of 45 members representing single-member constituencies throughout the state. Elections are held no more than five years apart.

The State Legislative Assembly convenes at the Kota Darul Naim in the state capital, Kota Bharu.

Out of the 45 seats, 42 are held by the Perikatan Nasional (PN) ruling coalition after the 2023 state election. Within the coalition, the Malaysian Islamic Party (PAS) holds 37 seats, the Malaysian United Indigenous Party (BERSATU) holds four seats, and the National Vision Party (WAWASAN) holds one seat. The PN coalition commands a two-thirds supermajority in the assembly.

Meanwhile, Barisan Nasional (BN) - United Malays National Organization (UMNO) holds two seats and Pakatan Harapan (PH) - National Trust Party (AMANAH) holds one seat.

Map of current constituencies (since 2018)

== Current composition ==
Government		Opposition
PN			BN	PH
42			2	1
37	4	1	2	1
PAS	BERSATU	WAWASAN	UMNO	AMANAH

No.	Parliamentary constituency	No.	State Constituency	Member	Coalition (Party)	Post
P19	Tumpat	N1	Pengkalan Kubor	Wan Roslan Wan Hamat	PN (PAS)	EXCO Member
P19	Tumpat	N2	Kelaboran	Mohd Adenan Hassan	PN (PAS)	N/A
P19	Tumpat	N3	Pasir Pekan	Ahmad Yakob	PN (PAS)	Former Menteri Besar of Kelantan
P19	Tumpat	N4	Wakaf Bharu	Mohd Rusli Abdullah	PN (PAS)	N/A
P20	Pengkalan Chepa	N5	Kijang	Izani Husin	PN (PAS)	EXCO Member
P20	Pengkalan Chepa	N6	Chempaka	Nik Asma' Bahrum Nik Abdullah	PN (PAS)	Deputy EXCO Member
P20	Pengkalan Chepa	N7	Panchor	Mohd. Amar Abdullah	PN (PAS)	Speaker
P21	Kota Bharu	N8	Tanjong Mas	Rohani Ibrahim	PN (PAS)	EXCO Member
P21	Kota Bharu	N9	Kota Lama	Hafidzah Mustakim	PH (AMANAH)	N/A
P21	Kota Bharu	N10	Bunut Payong	Shaari Mat Yaman	PN (PAS)	N/A
P22	Pasir Mas	N11	Tendong	Rozi Muhamad	PN (PAS)	N/A
P22	Pasir Mas	N12	Pengkalan Pasir	Mohd Nasriff Daud	PN (PAS)	Deputy EXCO Member
P22	Pasir Mas	N13	Meranti	Mohd Nassuruddin Daud	PN (PAS)	Menteri Besar
P23	Rantau Panjang	N14	Chetok	Zuraidin Abdullah	PN (PAS)	N/A
P23	Rantau Panjang	N15	Gual Periok	Kamaruzaman Mohamad	PN (PAS)	Deputy EXCO Member
P23	Rantau Panjang	N16	Apam Putra	Zamakhshari Mohamad	PN (PAS)	EXCO Member
P24	Kubang Kerian	N17	Salor	Saizol Ismail	PN (PAS)	Deputy EXCO Member
P24	Kubang Kerian	N18	Pasir Tumboh	Abd Rahman Yunus	PN (PAS)	Deputy EXCO Member
P24	Kubang Kerian	N19	Demit	Mohd Asri Mat Daud	PN (PAS)	EXCO Member
P25	Bachok	N20	Tawang	Harun Ismail	PN (PAS)	N/A
P25	Bachok	N21	Pantai Irama	Mohd Huzaimy Che Husin	PN (PAS)	N/A
P25	Bachok	N22	Jelawat	Zameri Mat Nawang	PN (PAS)	Deputy EXCO Member
P26	Ketereh	N23	Melor	Wan Rohimi Wan Daud	PN (PAS)	Deputy EXCO Member
P26	Ketereh	N24	Kadok	Azami Md. Nor	PN (PAS)	N/A
P26	Ketereh	N25	Kok Lanas	Mohamed Farid Mohamed Zawawi	PN (BERSATU)	Deputy Speaker
P26	Ketereh	N25	Kok Lanas	Mohamed Farid Mohamed Zawawi	PN (WAWASAN)	Deputy Speaker
P27	Tanah Merah	N26	Bukit Panau	Abdul Fatah Mahmood	PN (PAS)	N/A
P27	Tanah Merah	N27	Gual Ipoh	Bahari Mohamad Nor	PN (BERSATU)	N/A
P27	Tanah Merah	N28	Kemahang	Md. Anizam Ab. Rahman	PN (PAS)	EXCO Member
P28	Pasir Puteh	N29	Selising	Tuan Mohd Saripuddin Tuan Ismail	PN (PAS)	EXCO Member
P28	Pasir Puteh	N30	Limbongan	Nor Asilah Mohamed Zin	PN (PAS)	Deputy EXCO Member
P28	Pasir Puteh	N31	Semerak	Nor Sham Sulaiman	PN (PAS)	N/A
P28	Pasir Puteh	N32	Gaal	Mohd Rodzi Ja'afar	PN (PAS)	N/A
P29	Machang	N33	Pulai Chondong	Azhar Salleh	PN (PAS)	N/A
P29	Machang	N34	Temangan	Mohamed Fadzli Hassan	PN (PAS)	Deputy Menteri Besar
P29	Machang	N35	Kemuning	Ahmad Zakhran Mat Noor	PN (PAS)	N/A
P30	Jeli	N36	Bukit Bunga	Mohd Almidi Jaafar	PN (BERSATU)	N/A
P30	Jeli	N37	Air Lanas	Kamarudin Md Nor	PN (BERSATU)	N/A
P30	Jeli	N38	Kuala Balah	Abdul Hadi Awang Kechil	PN (PAS)	N/A
P31	Kuala Krai	N39	Mengkebang	Zubir Abu Bakar	PN (PAS)	N/A
P31	Kuala Krai	N40	Guchil	Hilmi Abdullah	PN (PAS)	EXCO Member
P31	Kuala Krai	N41	Manek Urai	Mohd Fauzi Abdullah	PN (PAS)	N/A
P31	Kuala Krai	N42	Dabong	Ku Mohd Zaki Ku Hussien	PN (PAS)	N/A
P32	Gua Musang	N43	Nenggiri	Mohd Azmawi Fikri Abdul Ghani	BN (UMNO)	N/A
P32	Gua Musang	N44	Paloh	Shaari Mat Hussain	PN (BERSATU)	Deputy EXCO Member
P32	Gua Musang	N45	Galas	Mohd Syahbuddin Hashim	BN (UMNO)	Leader of the Opposition

== Seating arrangement ==
	N38 Kuala Balah	N44 Paloh (Deputy EXCO)	N10 Bunut Payong	N12 Pengkalan Pasir (Deputy EXCO)	N22 Jelawat (Deputy EXCO)		N30 Limbongan (Deputy EXCO)	N27 Gual Ipoh (Deputy EXCO)	N06 Chempaka (Deputy EXCO)	N15 Gual Periok (Deputy EXCO)	N23 Melor (Deputy EXCO)
N39 Mengkebang	N26 Bukit Panau	N24 Kadok	N03 Pasir Pekan	N37 Ayer Lanas (EXCO Member)	N16 Apam Putra (EXCO Member)		N08 Tanjong Mas (EXCO Member)	N40 Guchil (EXCO Member)	N19 Demit (EXCO Member)	N01 Pengkalan Kubor (EXCO Member)	N29 Selising (EXCO Member)	N02 Kelaboran
N17 Salor (Deputy EXCO)	N18 Pasir Tumboh (Deputy EXCO)	B								A	N05 Kijang (EXCO Member)	N32 Gaal
N20 Tawang	N41 Manek Urai										N28 Kemahang (EXCO Member)	N04 Wakaf Bharu
N35 Kemuning	N21 Pantai Irama					Sergeant-at-Arm					State Financial Officer	N14 Chetok
N36 Bukit Bunga	N11 Tendong										State Legal Advisor	N42 Dabong
Vacant	N31 Semerak										State Secretary	N33 Pulai Chondong
N43 Nenggiri	Vacant					the Mace				V	N34 Temangan (Deputy Menteri Besar)	N25 Kok Lanas (Deputy Speaker)
N09 Kota Lama	N45 Galas (Opposition Leader)					Secretary					N13 Meranti (Menteri Besar)	N07 Panchor (Speaker)
						Speaker
						Sultan

== Role ==
The Kelantan State Legislative Assembly enacts legislation concerning matters in the State List and Joint List defined in the Federal Constitution. The Speaker presides over debates in the Assembly.

The leader of the majority party or coalition in the Assembly is appointed Menteri Besar by the Sultan of Kelantan. The person who assumes the role of Menteri Besar appoints the state's executive council, or EXCO (Majlis Mesyuarat Kerajaan), drawing from members of the Assembly.

=== Committees ===
The Assembly contains two administrative committees, namely:

- Public Accounts Committee
- Select Committee

== Election pendulum ==
The 2023 Kelantan state election witnessed 37 governmental seats and 8 non-governmental seats filled the Kelantan State Legislative Assembly. The government side has 41 safe seats and 1 fairly safe seats, while the non-government side has a fairly safe seat.

2023 Kelantan state election

GOVERNMENT SEATS
Marginal
Nenggiri	Mohd Azizi Abu Naim	BERSATU	53.31
Fairly safe
Paloh	Shaari Mat Hussain	BERSATU	58.74
Safe
Apam Putra	Zamakhshari Muhammad	PAS	61.12
Tendong	Rozi Muhamad	PAS	61.92
Bunut Payong	Shaari Mat Yaman	PAS	62.66
Dabong	Ku Mohd. Zaki Ku Hussein	PAS	63.44
Kuala Balah	Abdul Hadi Awang Kechil	PAS	63.31
Pengkalan Kubor	Wan Roslan Wan Hamat	PAS	63.70
Kemuning	Ahmad Zakhran Mat Noor	PAS	63.77
Gual Periok	Kamaruzaman Mohamad	PAS	64.19
Bukit Bunga	Mohd Almidi Jaafar	BERSATU	66.06
Tanjong Mas	Rohani Ibrahim	PAS	66.23
Semerak	Nor Sham Sulaiman	PAS	66.91
Pulai Chondong	Azhar Salleh	PAS	67.51
Wakaf Bharu	Mohd. Rusli Abdullah	PAS	67.73
Air Lanas	Kamarudin Md Nor	BERSATU	67.81
Kok Lanas	Mohamed Farid Mohamed Zawawi	BERSATU	68.07
Jelawat	Zameri Mat Nawang	PAS	69.09
Selising	Tuan Mohd. Sharipudin Tuan Ismail	PAS	69.11
Panchor	Mohd. Amar Nik Abdullah	PAS	70.00
Melor	Wan Rohimi Wan Daud	PAS	70.13
Gual Ipoh	Bahari Mohamad Nor	BERSATU	70.26
Guchil	Hilmi Abdullah	PAS	70.49
Pengkalan Pasir	Mohamad Nasriff Daud	PAS	70.71
Pantai Irama	Mohd. Huzaimy Che Husin	PAS	70.81
Kelaboran	Mohd. Adanan Hassan	PAS	70.91
Salor	Saizol Ismail	PAS	71.19
Gaal	Mohd. Rodzi Ja'afar	PAS	72.65
Limbongan	Nurul Asilah Mohd Zain	PAS	73.04
Temangan	Mohamed Fadzli Hassan	PAS	73.25
Chetok	Zuraidin Abdullah	PAS	74.38
Chempaka	Nik Asma' Bahrum Nik Abdullah	PAS	74.46
Demit	Muhamad Asri Mat Daud	PAS	75.39
Kijang	Dr. Izani Husin	PAS	75.81
Pasir Pekan	Ahmad Yakob	PAS	75.88
Kadok	Azami Mohd. Nor	PAS	75.95
Meranti	Mohd. Nassurruddin Daud	PAS	76.36
Pasir Tumboh	Abd. Rahman Yunus	PAS	76.61
Kemahang	Md. Anizam Ab. Rahman	PAS	77.20
Manek Urai	Mohd. Fauzi Abdullah	PAS	78.33
Mengkebang	Zubir Abu Bakar	PAS	78.64
Bukit Panau	Abdul Fattah Mahmood	PAS	79.14
Tawang	Harun Ismail	PAS	79.22

NON-GOVERNMENT SEATS
Marginal
Kota Lama	Hafidzah Mustakim	AMANAH	49.98
Fairly safe
Galas	Mohd Syahbuddin Hashim	UMNO	59.19

== List of Assemblies ==
Assembly	Term began	Members	Committee	Governing parties
State Council	1955	33	Tengku Muhammad Hamzah I	Alliance (UMNO–MCA)
1st	1959	30	Ishak Lotfi I	PMIP
2nd	1964	30	Mohd Asri I	PMIP
3rd	1969	30	Mohd Asri II (1969–1973)	PMIP (1969–1972) PAS–Alliance (UMNO–MCA) (1972–1973)
3rd	1969	30	Ishak Lotfi II (1973–1974)	BN (PAS–UMNO–MCA) (1973–1974)
4th	1974	36	Mohamed Nasir	BN (PAS–UMNO–MCA) (1974–1977) BN (UMNO–MCA) (1977–1978)
5th	1978	36	Mohamed Yaacob I	BN (UMNO–MCA)–BERJASA (1978) BN (UMNO–MCA–BERJASA) (1978–1982)
6th	1982	36	Mohamed Yaacob II	BN (UMNO–MCA–BERJASA)
7th	1986	39	Mohamed Yaacob III	BN (UMNO–MCA–HAMIM) (1986–1988) BN (UMNO–MCA) (1988–1990)
8th	1990	39	Nik Abdul Aziz I	APU (PAS–S46–HAMIM–BERJASA)
9th	1995	43	Nik Abdul Aziz II	APU (PAS–S46) (1995–1996)
9th	1995	43	Nik Abdul Aziz II	PAS (1996–1999)
10th	1999	43	Nik Abdul Aziz III	BA (PAS)
11th	2004	45	Nik Abdul Aziz IV	PAS
12th	2008	45	Nik Abdul Aziz V	PR (PAS–PKR)
13th	2013	45	Ahmad Yakob I	PR (PAS–PKR) (2013–2015)
13th	2013	45	Ahmad Yakob I	PAS (2015–2018)
14th	2018	45	Ahmad Yakob II	PAS (2018–2019)
14th	2018	45	Ahmad Yakob II	PAS–BN (UMNO) (2019–2020)
14th	2018	45	Ahmad Yakob II	PN (PAS–BERSATU)–BN (UMNO) (2020–2022); PN (PAS–BERSATU) (2022–2023)
15th	2023	45	Mohd Nassuruddin	PN (PAS–BERSATU) (2023–2026); PN (PAS–BERSATU–WAWASAN) (2026–present)

== See also ==
- List of State Seats Representatives in Malaysia
- State legislative assemblies of Malaysia
