= 2013 Kelantan state election =

Malaysian state legislative election

- 5 May 2013

All 45 seats in the Kelantan State Legislative Assembly 23 seats needed for a majority
- Turnout: 769,595
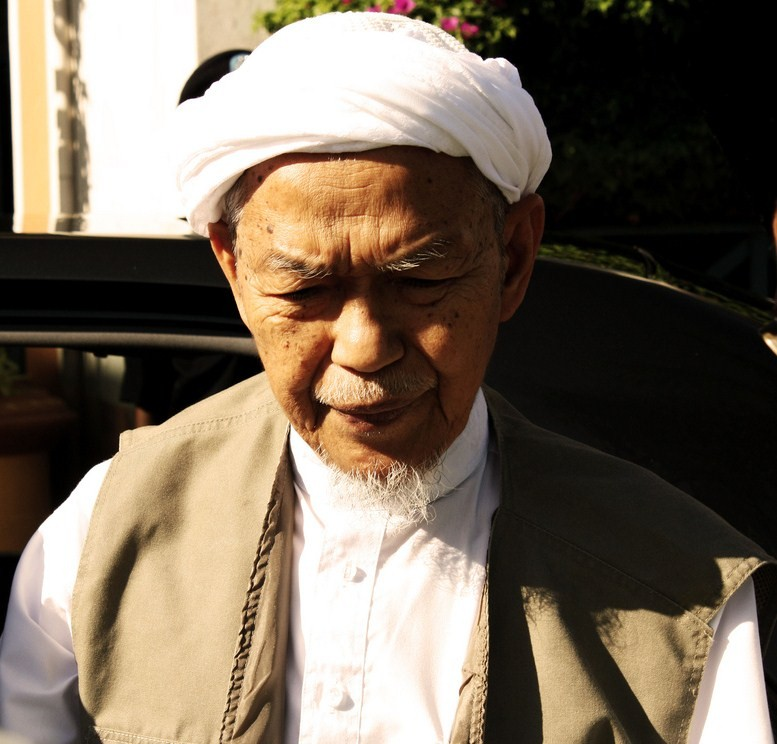

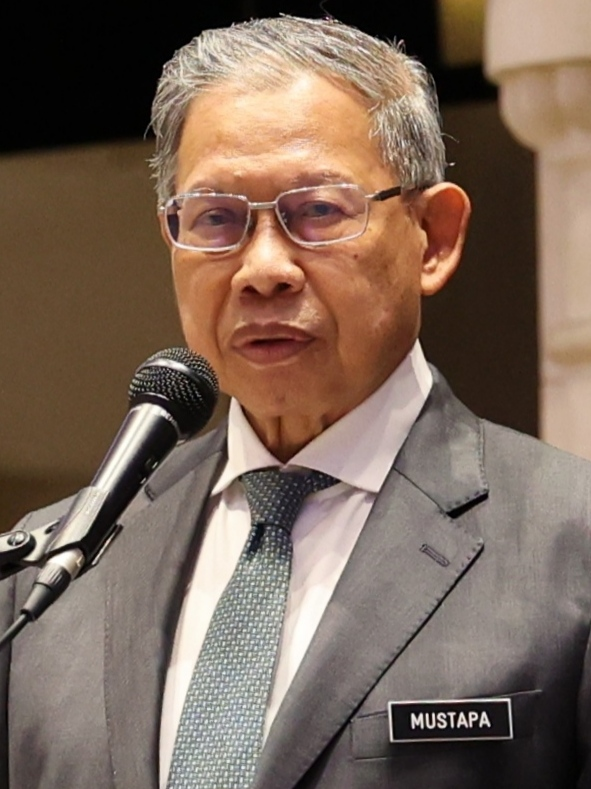
	Majority party	Minority party
Leader	Nik Aziz Nik Mat	Mustapa Mohamed
Party	PAS	UMNO
Alliance	Pakatan Rakyat	Barisan Nasional
Leader since	1981	2009
Leader's seat	Chempaka	Ayer Lanas
Last election	39	6
Seats before	38	7
Seats won	33	12
Seat change	▼6	▲6
Popular vote	425,291 (Note: All the figures of votes and seats are a combined result of PAS,PKR and DAP.)	343,416 (Note: All the figures of votes and seats are a combined result of all the component parties in BN.)
Percentage	55.26%	44.62%
Menteri Besar before election
Nik Aziz Nik Mat
Pakatan Rakyat (PAS)
Elected Menteri Besar
Ahmad Yakob
Pakatan Rakyat (PAS)

The 13th Kelantan state election were held on 5 May 2013. Polling took place in 45 constituencies throughout the Malaysian state of Kelantan, with each electing a State Assemblyman to the Kelantan State Legislative Assembly. The election was conducted by the Malaysian Election Commission. The state election was held concurrently with the 2013 Malaysian general election.

Parti Islam Se-Malaysia (PAS), the governing party of the state, won the election with 32 seats. Its Pakatan Rakyat (PR) ally, Parti Keadilan Rakyat (PKR), won 1 seat, while the main opposition party of the state Barisan Nasional won the remaining 12 seats.

This election is the only time the DAP-PAS-PKR coalition is referred as Pakatan Rakyat during the Kelantan state election campaign (although each party is contesting using their own name and logo), and also the final Kelantan state election which the three parties works as a coalition; PR splits in 2015 due to disagreements between DAP and PAS.

== Background ==
Nik Aziz Nik Mat, the Menteri Besar of Kelantan, announced the dissolution of Kelantan State Assembly on 3 April 2013, 11;55pm (Malaysia time), after receiving consent from Sultan of Kelantan.

The state assembly were scheduled to be automatically dissolved on 28 April 2013, before the announcement by Nik Aziz.

=== Political parties ===
Barisan Nasional, spearheaded by United Malays National Organization (UMNO), were targeting to win 23 seats to wrestle back the state control from PAS. BN announced its candidate for all 45 state seats on 15 April 2013, led by its state chief Mustapa Mohamed who is contesting in Ayer Lanas. The BN candidates includes 1 Malaysian Chinese Association (MCA) candidate who will contest in Kota Lama, a constituency with the most Chinese voters compared to other constituency in Kelantan; and 1 People's Progressive Party (PPP) candidate who will contest in Guchil.

PAS, together with PKR, unveiled its candidate for all state seats on 17 April 2013. PAS who have governed the state for the last 23 years uninterrupted, were led by Nik Aziz Nik Mat, PAS Spiritual Leader, PAS Kelantan state commissioner, and the state Menteri Besar since 1990. Democratic Action Party (DAP), the other party in the PR bloc, is not participating in the state election due to perceived negative view of the party from the state's voters.

== Campaign ==
BN launched its manifesto for Kelantan titled 'Rakyat Dihati, Janji Ditepati' (People at Heart, Promises Kept) on 11 April 2013 by the BN Kelantan leader, Mustapa Mohamed.

PAS meanwhile launched its manifesto titled 'Keberkatan, Kemakmuran dan Kebajikan' (Blessings, Prosperity and Welfare) on 23 April 2013.

== Results ==
Party or alliance		Votes	%	Seats	+/–
Pakatan Rakyat	Pan-Malaysian Islamic Party	398,238	51.75	32	–6
Pakatan Rakyat	People's Justice Party	27,053	3.52	1	0
Pakatan Rakyat	Total	425,291	55.26	33	-6
Barisan Nasional	United Malays National Organisation	328,454	42.68	12	+6
Barisan Nasional	Malaysian Chinese Association	7,651	0.99	0	0
Barisan Nasional	People's Progressive Party	7,311	0.95	0	0
Barisan Nasional	Total	343,416	44.62	12	+6
Independents		888	0.12	0	0
Total		769,595	100.00	45	–
Valid votes		769,595	98.66		
Invalid/blank votes		10,487	1.34		
Total votes		780,082	100.00		
Registered voters/turnout		918,573	84.92		
Source: https://undi.info

== Aftermath ==
Ahmad Yakob, MLA for Pasir Pekan and the Deputy State Commissioner of PAS Kelantan, were sworn in as the new Menteri Besar of Kelantan on 6 May 2013, replacing Nik Aziz Nik Mat who has held the position since 1990. The appointment of Ahmad Yakob were agreed by the PAS leadership as requested by Nik Aziz, who stepped down because of health issues. Nik Aziz later died in 2015, and 2015 Chempaka by-election were held, which PAS won.

Although BN improved on their poor performance in the 2008 state election, winning 12 seats as opposed to just 6 seats in the last election, it still failed in their objective to take over control of the Kelantan government. Mustapa said in their post mortem, BN Kelantan identified their weakness in communicating the local issues and the lack of BN religious leaders are some of the factors to their failure in the election.

2014 Pengkalan Kubor by-election were held after the death of its assemblymen. BN retained the seat after it won the by election. In 2017, BN loses the Nenggiri seat after a voting to declare the seat vacant by the State Assembly, due to bankruptcy of its BN assemblymen. However no by-elections were held as there is less than 2 years before the expiry of the current assembly.

In 2015, the PR coalition was disbanded, due to disagreements between PAS and DAP over the former's insistence to implement the Islamic penal code, known as hudud, in Kelantan. Also in 2015, a group of progressives in PAS led by Mohamad Sabu exits the party after losing in the party election, later forming National Trust Party (Amanah). Amanah joined forces with DAP and PKR in forming a successor coalition to PR, later known as Pakatan Harapan (PH) after Parti Pribumi Bersatu Malaysia (Bersatu), a splinter party of UMNO dissidents, joined the coalition in 2017. The state government were not affected by the split, as PAS holds the majority and only one MLA for PKR switched to the opposition, though later MLA for Salor Husam Musa joined Amanah after being sacked by PAS in 2016.
