= Mohd Zulkifli Zakaria =

Malaysian politician

Member of the Supreme Leadership Council of Malaysian United Indigenous Party
- In office 23 August 2020 – 2022
- President: Muhyiddin Yassin

Deputy Chief of the Kelantan Malaysian United Indigenous Party State Leadership Body
- In office 23 August 2020 – 2022
- Chief: Kamarudin Md Nor

Personal details
- Party: United Malays National Organisation (UMNO); Malaysian United Indigenous Party (BERSATU) (−2022); Independent (2022–2023); Democratic Action Party (DAP) (since 2023)
- Other political affiliations: Barisan Nasional (BN); Pakatan Harapan (PH) (−2020 and since 2023); Perikatan Nasional (PN) (2020–2022)
- Occupation: Politician

Mohd Zulkifli bin Zakaria is a Malaysian politician who was a member of the Supreme Leadership Council of Malaysian United Indigenous Party from 23 August 2020 to 2022. He is a member of Democratic Action Party (DAP), a component party of Pakatan Harapan (PH), and former member of Malaysian United Indigenous Party (BERSATU), a component party of Perikatan Nasional (PN). He is the head of DAP Bachok branch since 2024.

== Election results ==
Kelantan State Legislative Assembly
Year	Constituency	Candidate	Votes	Pct	Opponent(s)	Votes	Pct	Ballots cast	Majority	Turnout
2004	N20 Tawang	Mohd Zulkifli Zakaria (UMNO)	6,815	44.49%	Hasan Mohamood (PAS)	8,503	55.51%	15,527	1,688	84.47%

Parliament of Malaysia
Year	Constituency	Candidate	Votes	Pct	Opponent(s)	Votes	Pct	Ballots cast	Majority	Turnout
2018	P025 Bachok	Mohd Zulkifli Zakaria (PPBM)	4,880	6.60%	Nik Mohamad Abduh Nik Abdul Aziz (PAS)	36,188	48.93%	75,945	3,292	82.01%
2018	P025 Bachok	Mohd Zulkifli Zakaria (PPBM)	4,880	6.60%	Awang Adek Hussin (UMNO)	32,896	44.48%	75,945	3,292	82.01%
2022	P025 Bachok	Mohd Zulkifli Zakaria (IND)	418	0.47%	Mohd Syahir Che Sulaiman (PAS)	57,130	63.89%	91,223	29,901	72.59%
2022	P025 Bachok	Mohd Zulkifli Zakaria (IND)	418	0.47%	Mohd Zain Yasim (UMNO)	27,229	30.45%	91,223	29,901	72.59%
2022	P025 Bachok	Mohd Zulkifli Zakaria (IND)	418	0.47%	Nur Azmiza Mamat (PKR)	4,366	4.88%	91,223	29,901	72.59%
2022	P025 Bachok	Mohd Zulkifli Zakaria (IND)	418	0.47%	Kamarul Azam Abdel Osman (PUTRA)	274	0.31%	91,223	29,901	72.59%
