= Bachok (federal constituency) =

Federal constituency of Kelantan, Malaysia

Bachok (P025)
Kelantan constituency
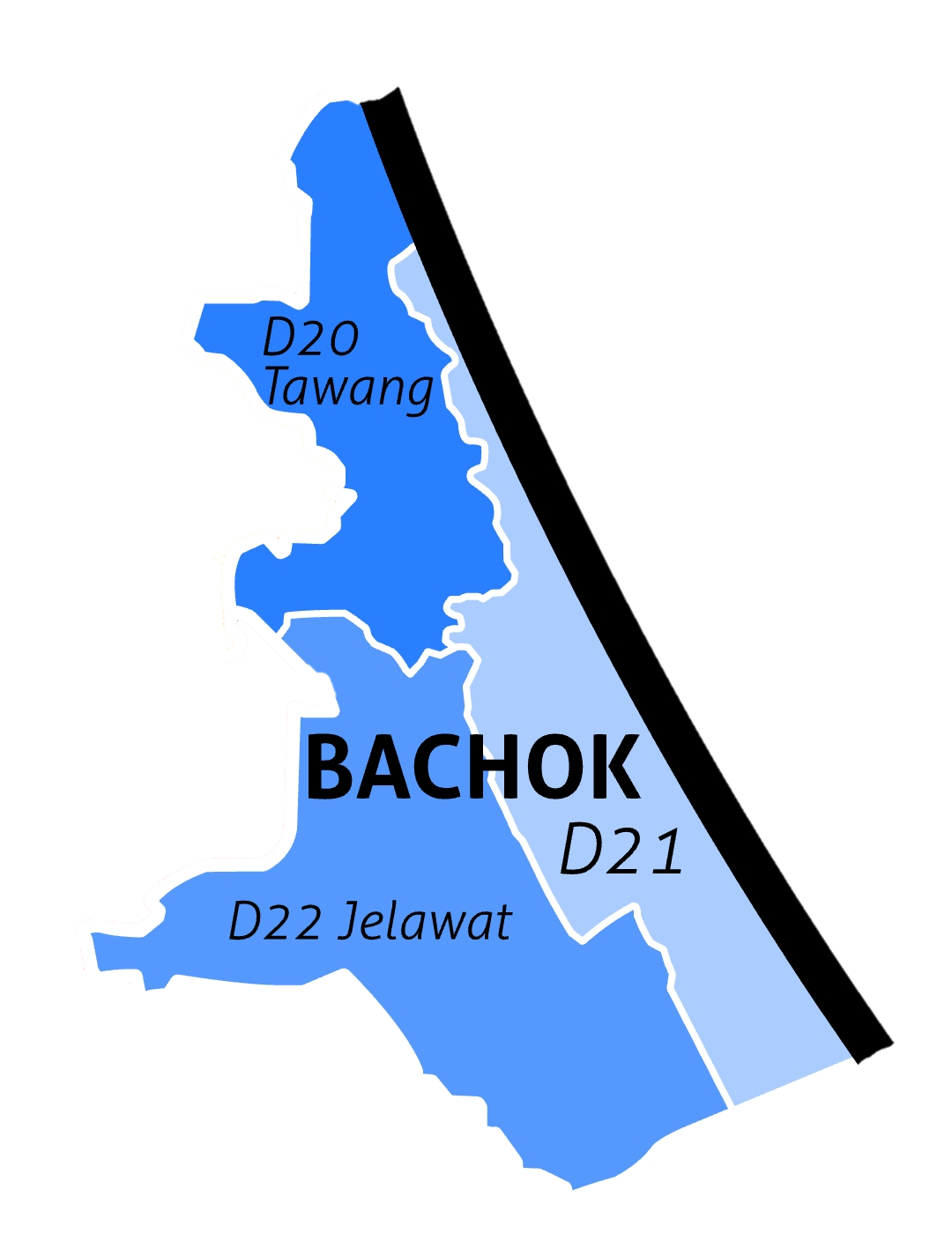

Federal constituency
- Legislature: Dewan Rakyat
- MP: Mohd Syahir Che Sulaiman; PN
- Constituency created: 1958
- First contested: 1959
- Last contested: 2022

Demographics
- Population (2020): 157,291
- Electors (2023): 123,965
- Area (km²): 279
- Pop. density (per km²): 563.8

Bachok is a federal constituency in Bachok District and part of Kota Bharu District, Kelantan, Malaysia, that has been represented in the Dewan Rakyat since 1959. Bachok is between Kota Bharu and Besut.

The federal constituency was created in the 1958 redistribution and is mandated to return a single member to the Dewan Rakyat under the first past the post voting system.

== Demographics ==
https://live.chinapress.com.my/ge15/parliament/KELANTAN

Ethnic breakdown of Bachok's electorate as of 2022
1. Malay (98.5%)
2. Chinese (1.10%)
3. Other ethnicities (0.30%)
4. Indian (0.10%)

As of 2020, Bachok has a population of 157,291 people.

Age breakdown of Bachok's electorate as of 2022
1. 18-20 (7.42%)
2. 21-29 (24.1%)
3. 30-39 (24.9%)
4. 40-49 (16.9%)
5. 50-59 (12.7%)
6. 60-69 (8.53%)
7. 70-79 (4.15%)
8. 80-89 (1.05%)
9. above 90 (0.22%)
Gender breakdown of Bachok's electorate as of 2022
1. Male (49.1%)
2. Female (50.9%)

== History ==
=== Polling districts ===
According to the federal gazette issued on 18 July 2023, the Bachok constituency is divided into 45 polling districts.

| State constituency | Polling Districts | Code | Location |
|---|---|---|---|
| Tawang (N20） | Senak | 025/20/01 | SK Pantai Senak |
| Tawang (N20） | Wakaf Alik | 025/20/02 | SMU (A) Muhammadiah Beris Panchor |
| Tawang (N20） | Tawang | 025/20/03 | SK Tawang |
| Tawang (N20） | Beris Gajah Mati | 025/20/04 | SK Beris Panchor |
| Tawang (N20） | Anak Tembesu | 025/20/05 | SMK Beris Panchor |
| Tawang (N20） | Kampung Tok Jawa | 025/20/06 | SK Kota Jembal |
| Tawang (N20） | Telok Mesira | 025/20/07 | SK Kota Jembal |
| Tawang (N20） | Pauh Sembilan | 025/20/08 | SK Pauh Sembilan |
| Tawang (N20） | Tok Belian | 025/20/09 | SK Pengkalan Chengal |
| Tawang (N20） | Tanjong Jering | 025/20/10 | SK Tanjong Jenara |
| Tawang (N20） | Beris | 025/20/11 | SMK Long Yunus |
| Tawang (N20） | Tanjong Pauh | 025/20/12 | SK Pa' Pura |
| Tawang (N20） | Chap | 025/20/13 | SK Kampong Chap |
| Tawang (N20） | Bukit Marak | 025/20/14 | SK Bukit Marak |
| Tawang (N20） | Paya Teratai | 025/20/15 | SK Chantum |
| Tawang (N20） | Bekelam | 025/20/16 | SK Bekelam |
| Pantai Irama (N21） | Kubang Golok | 025/21/01 | SK Kubang Golok |
| Pantai Irama (N21） | Perupok | 025/21/02 | SK Perupok |
| Pantai Irama (N21） | Kampung Sungai | 025/21/03 | SMK Bachok |
| Pantai Irama (N21） | Pantai Damat | 025/21/04 | SK Bachok |
| Pantai Irama (N21） | Kampung Kemudi | 025/21/05 | SK Seri Kemudi |
| Pantai Irama (N21） | Kampung Nipah | 025/21/06 | SMK Nipah |
| Pantai Irama (N21） | Pantai Irama | 025/21/07 | Dewan Majlis Daerah Bachok |
| Pantai Irama (N21） | Padang China | 025/21/08 | SMK Badak |
| Pantai Irama (N21） | Kuau | 025/21/09 | SK Badak |
| Pantai Irama (N21） | Badak | 025/21/10 | SMK Badak |
| Pantai Irama (N21） | Melawi | 025/21/11 | SK Tangok |
| Pantai Irama (N21） | Kampung Sungai Dua | 025/21/12 | SK Sungai Dua |
| Pantai Irama (N21） | Tangok | 025/21/13 | SMK Dato' Perdana |
| Pantai Irama (N21） | Rusa | 025/21/14 | SMA Tok Bachok |
| Pantai Irama (N21） | Telong | 025/21/15 | SMK Kandis |
| Pantai Irama (N21） | Kandis | 025/21/16 | SK Kandis |
| Jelawat（N22） | Kampung Redang | 025/22/01 | SK Sri Kemuning |
| Jelawat（N22） | Beris Lalang | 025/22/02 | SK Beris Lalang |
| Jelawat（N22） | Jelawat Tengah | 025/22/03 | SK Jelawat |
| Jelawat（N22） | Kampung Bator | 025/22/04 | SMK Jelawat |
| Jelawat（N22） | Kuchelong | 025/22/05 | SK Kuchelong |
| Jelawat（N22） | Kedai Pauh Lima | 025/22/06 | SK Pauh Lima |
| Jelawat（N22） | Teratak Pulai | 025/22/07 | SK Gunong |
| Jelawat（N22） | Seneng | 025/22/08 | SK Seneng |
| Jelawat（N22） | Telaga Ara | 025/22/09 | SK Telaga Ara |
| Jelawat（N22） | Keting | 025/22/10 | SK Keting |
| Jelawat（N22） | Gunong | 025/22/11 | SMK Sri Gunung |
| Jelawat（N22） | Alor Bakat | 025/22/12 | SK Alor Bakat |
| Jelawat（N22） | Mahligai | 025/22/13 | SK Pak Badol |
| Jelawat（N22） | Pak Badol | 025/22/14 | SMK Pak Bodol |
| Jelawat（N22） | Serdang | 025/22/15 | SK Kolam |
| Jelawat（N22） | Kolam | 025/22/16 | SMU (A) Darul Ulum Muhammadiah |
| Jelawat（N22） | Kubang Telaga | 025/22/17 | SK Kubang Telaga |
| Jelawat（N22） | Kampung Bakong | 025/22/18 | SK Bakong |

=== Representation history ===
Members of Parliament for Bachok
| Parliament | No | Years | Member | Party | Vote Share |
Constituency created from Kelantan Timor
Parliament of the Federation of Malaya
| 1st | P019 | 1959–1963 | Zulkiflee Muhammad (ذوالكفل محمّد) | PMIP | 13,880; 78.68% |
Parliament of Malaysia
| 1st | P019 | 1963–1964 | Zulkiflee Muhammad (ذوالكفل محمّد) | PMIP | 13,880; 78.68% |
| 2nd | P019 | 1964 | Zulkiflee Muhammad (ذوالكفل محمّد) | PMIP | 12,659; 60.46% |
| 2nd | P019 | 1964–1969 | Abu Bakar Hamzah (أبو بكر حمزة) | PMIP | 11,900; 57.88% |
| | | 1969–1971 | Parliament was suspended | | |
| 3rd | P019 | 1971–1973 | Mohd Zain Abdullah (محمد زين عبدالله) | PMIP | 13,069; 54.43% |
| 3rd | P019 | 1973–1974 | Mohd Zain Abdullah (محمد زين عبدالله) | BN (PMIP) | 13,069; 54.43% |
| 4th | P020 | 1974–1978 | Mohd Zain Abdullah (محمد زين عبدالله) | BN (PAS) | Uncontested |
| 5th | P020 | 1978–1982 | Mohd Zain Abdullah (محمد زين عبدالله) | PAS | 12,469; 50.72% |
| 6th | P020 | 1982–1986 | Mohd Zain Abdullah (محمد زين عبدالله) | PAS | 15,925; 52.08% |
| 7th | P023 | 1986–1990 | Mohd Zain Abdullah (محمد زين عبدالله) | BN (HAMIM) | 16,617; 50.41% |
| 8th | P023 | 1990–1995 | Buniyamin Yaakob (بنيامين يعقوب) | APU (PAS) | 24,772; 66.43% |
| 9th | P025 | 1995–1999 | Buniyamin Yaakob (بنيامين يعقوب) | APU (PAS) | 21,336; 56.62% |
| 10th | P025 | 1999–2004 | Wan Nik Wan Yusoff (وان نئ وان يوسف) | BA (PAS) | 24,637; 62.44% |
| 11th | P025 | 2004–2008 | Awang Adek Hussin (أواڠ أديق حسين) | BN (UMNO) | 23,341; 51.74% |
| 12th | P025 | 2008–2013 | Nasharudin Mat Isa (نصرالدين مت عيسى) | PR (PAS) | 28,835; 52.65% |
| 13th | P025 | 2013–2015 | Ahmad Marzuk Shaary (أحمد مرزوق شاعري) | PR (PAS) | 35,414; 50.14% |
| 13th | P025 | 2015–2016 | Ahmad Marzuk Shaary (أحمد مرزوق شاعري) | PAS | 35,414; 50.14% |
| 13th | P025 | 2016–2018 | Ahmad Marzuk Shaary (أحمد مرزوق شاعري) | GS (PAS) | 35,414; 50.14% |
| 14th | P025 | 2018–2020 | Nik Mohamad Abduh Nik Abdul Aziz (نئ محمد عبدوه نئ عبدالعزيز) | GS (PAS) | 36,188; 48.93% |
| 14th | P025 | 2020–2022 | Nik Mohamad Abduh Nik Abdul Aziz (نئ محمد عبدوه نئ عبدالعزيز) | PN (PAS) | 36,188; 48.93% |
| 15th | P025 | 2022–present | Mohd Syahir Che Sulaiman (محمد شاهر چي سليمان) | PN (PAS) | 57,496; 63.95% |

=== State constituency ===
| Parliamentary constituency | State constituency | | | | | | |
| Parliamentary constituency | 1955–1959* | 1959–1974 | 1974–1986 | 1986–1995 | 1995–2004 | 2004–2018 | 2018–present |
|---|---|---|---|---|---|---|---|
| Bachok | | Bachok Selatan | | | | | |
| Bachok | | Bachok Tengah | | | | | |
| Bachok | | Bachok Utara | | | | | |
| Bachok | | | Jelawat | | | | |
| Bachok | | | | | | | Pantai Irama |
| Bachok | | | Perupok | | | | |
| Bachok | | | Tawang | | | | |

=== Historical boundaries ===
| State Constituency | Area | | | | | |
| State Constituency | 1959 | 1974 | 1984 | 1994 | 2003 | 2018 |
|---|---|---|---|---|---|---|
| Bachok Selatan | Be'oh; Gunong; Kandis; Kampung Bakong; Telong | | | | | |
| Bachok Tengah | Bachok; Melawi; Pantai Irama; Perupok; Taman Bisikan Bayu | | | | | |
| Bachok Utara | Alor Jambu; Bekelam; Kampung Budi; Pantai Senak; Wakaf Zin | | | | | |
| Jelawat | | Be'oh; Gunong; Kandis; Kampung Bakong; Telong | | Be'oh; Gunong; Kandis; Kampung Bakong; Kampung Teratak Pulai | Be'oh; Gunong; Jelawat; Kampung Bakong; Kampung Teratak Pulai | |
| Pantai Irama | | | | | | Bachok; Kandis; Melawi; Pantai Irama; Perupok |
| Perupok | | Bachok; Melawi; Pantai Irama; Perupok; Taman Bisikan Bayu | | Bachok; Melawi; Pantai Irama; Perupok; Telong | Bachok; Kandis; Melawi; Pantai Irama; Perupok | |
| Tawang | | Alor Jambu; Bekelam; Kampung Budi; Pantai Senak; Wakaf Zin | | Alor Jambu; Bekelam; Beris Kubur Besar; Kampung Budi; Wakaf Zin | Alor Jambu; Bekelam; Kampung Budi; Pantai Senak; Wakaf Zin | |

=== Current state assembly members ===
| No. | State Constituency | Member | Coalition (Party) |
|---|---|---|---|
| N20 | Tawang | Harun Ismail | PN (PAS) |
| N21 | Pantai Irama | Mohd Huzaimy Che Husin | PN (PAS) |
| N22 | Jelawat | Zameri Mat Nawang | PN (PAS) |

=== Local governments & postcodes ===
| No. | State Constituency | Local Government | Postcode |
|---|---|---|---|
| N20 | Tawang | Bachok District Council | 16020, 16030, 16050, 16060, 16070, 16090, 16300, 16310, 16320 Bachok; 16150 Kota Bharu |
| N21 | Pantai Irama | Bachok District Council | 16020, 16030, 16050, 16060, 16070, 16090, 16300, 16310, 16320 Bachok; 16150 Kota Bharu |
| N22 | Jelawat | Bachok District Council | 16020, 16030, 16050, 16060, 16070, 16090, 16300, 16310, 16320 Bachok; 16150 Kota Bharu |

== Election results ==
Malaysian general election, 2022
| Party | Candidate | Votes | % | ∆% |
|---|---|---|---|---|
| PAS | Mohd Syahir Che Sulaiman | 57,496 | 63.95 | ▲15.02 |
| BN | Mohd Zain Yasim | 27,333 | 30.40 | ▼14.08 |
| PH | Nur Azmiza Mamat | 4,385 | 4.88 | ▲4.88 |
| Independent | Mohd Zulkifli Zakaria | 423 | 0.47 | ▲0.47 |
| PUTRA | Kamarul Azam Abdel Osman | 276 | 0.31 | ▲0.31 |
| Total valid votes | | 89,913 | 100.00 | |
| Total rejected ballots | | 1,019 | | |
| Unreturned ballots | | 260 | | |
| Turnout | | 91,223 | 74.03 | ▼7.98 |
| Registered electors | | 123,183 | | |
| Majority | | 30,163 | 33.55 | ▲29.10 |
| PAS hold | | Swing | | |
Source(s) https://lom.agc.gov.my/ilims/upload/portal/akta/outputp/1753266/PUB%20607%20(2022).pdf

Malaysian general election, 2018
| Party | Candidate | Votes | % | ∆% |
|---|---|---|---|---|
| PAS | Nik Mohamad Abduh Nik Abdul Aziz | 36,188 | 48.93 | ▼1.21 |
| BN | Awang Adek Hussin | 32,896 | 44.48 | ▼5.38 |
| PKR | Zulkifli Zakaria | 4,880 | 6.60 | ▲6.60 |
| Total valid votes | | 73,964 | 100.00 | |
| Total rejected ballots | | 1,148 | | |
| Unreturned ballots | | 833 | | |
| Turnout | | 75,945 | 82.01 | ▼6.01 |
| Registered electors | | 92,606 | | |
| Majority | | 3,292 | 4.45 | ▲4.17 |
| PAS hold | | Swing | | |
Source(s) "His Majesty's Government Gazette - Notice of Contested Election, Parliament for the State of Kelantan [P.U. (B) 234/2018]" (PDF). Attorney General's Chambers of Malaysia. 3 May 2018. "Federal Government Gazette - Results of Contested Election and Statements of the Poll after the Official Addition of Votes, Parliamentary Constituencies for the State of Kelantan [P.U. (B) 308/2018]" (PDF). Attorney General's Chambers of Malaysia. 28 May 2018.

Malaysian general election, 2013
| Party | Candidate | Votes | % | ∆% |
|---|---|---|---|---|
| PAS | Ahmad Marzuk Shaary | 35,419 | 50.14 | ▼2.51 |
| BN | Awang Adek Hussin | 35,218 | 49.86 | ▲2.51 |
| Total valid votes | | 70,637 | 100.00 | |
| Total rejected ballots | | 947 | | |
| Unreturned ballots | | 208 | | |
| Turnout | | 71,792 | 88.02 | ▲2.04 |
| Registered electors | | 81,566 | | |
| Majority | | 201 | 0.28 | ▼5.02 |
| PAS hold | | Swing | | |
Source(s) "Federal Government Gazette - Notice of Contested Election, Parliament for the State of Kelantan [P.U. (B) 171/2013]" (PDF). Attorney General's Chambers of Malaysia. 26 April 2013. "Federal Government Gazette - Results of Contested Election and Statements of the Poll after the Official Addition of Votes, Parliamentary Constituencies for the State of Kelantan [P.U. (B) 212/2013]" (PDF). Attorney General's Chambers of Malaysia. 22 May 2013. Archived from the original (PDF) on 29 December 2019.

Malaysian general election, 2008
| Party | Candidate | Votes | % | ∆% |
|---|---|---|---|---|
| PAS | Nasharudin Mat Isa | 28,835 | 52.65 | ▲4.39 |
| BN | Awang Adek Hussin | 25,934 | 47.35 | ▼4.39 |
| Total valid votes | | 54,769 | 100.00 | |
| Total rejected ballots | | 811 | | |
| Unreturned ballots | | 144 | | |
| Turnout | | 55,724 | 85.98 | ▲2.22 |
| Registered electors | | 64,808 | | |
| Majority | | 2,901 | 5.30 | ▲1.82 |
| PAS gain from BN | | Swing | | ? |

Malaysian general election, 2004
| Party | Candidate | Votes | % | ∆% |
|---|---|---|---|---|
| BN | Awang Adek Hussin | 23,341 | 51.74 | ▲14.18 |
| PAS | Wan Nik Wan Yusoff | 21,774 | 48.26 | ▼14.18 |
| Total valid votes | | 45,115 | 100.00 | |
| Total rejected ballots | | 893 | | |
| Unreturned ballots | | 327 | | |
| Turnout | | 46,335 | 83.76 | ▲4.70 |
| Registered electors | | 55,318 | | |
| Majority | | 1,567 | 3.48 | ▼21.40 |
| BN gain from PAS | | Swing | | ? |

Malaysian general election, 1999
| Party | Candidate | Votes | % | ∆% |
|---|---|---|---|---|
| PAS | Wan Nik Wan Yusoff | 24,637 | 62.44 | ▲5.82 |
| BN | Azaki Ishak | 14,820 | 37.56 | ▼5.82 |
| Total valid votes | | 39,457 | 100.00 | |
| Total rejected ballots | | 922 | | |
| Unreturned ballots | | 231 | | |
| Turnout | | 40,610 | 79.06 | ▲0.85 |
| Registered electors | | 51,366 | | |
| Majority | | 9,817 | 24.88 | ▲11.64 |
| PAS hold | | Swing | | |

Malaysian general election, 1995
| Party | Candidate | Votes | % | ∆% |
|---|---|---|---|---|
| PAS | Buniyamin Yaakob | 21,336 | 56.62 | ▼9.81 |
| BN | Zaiyadi Awang Noh Ke | 16,346 | 43.38 | ▲9.81 |
| Total valid votes | | 37,682 | 100.00 | |
| Total rejected ballots | | 1,267 | | |
| Unreturned ballots | | 141 | | |
| Turnout | | 39,090 | 78.21 | ▼3.86 |
| Registered electors | | 49,980 | | |
| Majority | | 4,990 | 13.24 | ▼19.62 |
| PAS hold | | Swing | | |

Malaysian general election, 1990
| Party | Candidate | Votes | % | ∆% |
|---|---|---|---|---|
| PAS | Buniyamin Yaakob | 24,772 | 66.43 | ▲16.84 |
| BN | Mohd. Zain Abdullah | 12,518 | 33.57 | ▼16.84 |
| Total valid votes | | 37,290 | 100.00 | |
| Total rejected ballots | | 803 | | |
| Unreturned ballots | | 0 | | |
| Turnout | | 38,093 | 82.07 | ▲1.99 |
| Registered electors | | 46,416 | | |
| Majority | | 12,254 | 32.86 | ▲32.04 |
| PAS gain from BN | | Swing | | ? |

Malaysian general election, 1986
| Party | Candidate | Votes | % | ∆% |
|---|---|---|---|---|
| BN | Mohd. Zain Abdullah | 16,617 | 50.41 | ▲2.49 |
| PAS | Nik Abdul Aziz Nik Mat | 16,347 | 49.59 | ▼2.49 |
| Total valid votes | | 32,964 | 100.00 | |
| Total rejected ballots | | 663 | | |
| Unreturned ballots | | 0 | | |
| Turnout | | 33,627 | 80.08 | ▼3.31 |
| Registered electors | | 41,992 | | |
| Majority | | 270 | 0.82 | ▼3.34 |
| BN gain from PAS | | Swing | | ? |

Malaysian general election, 1982
| Party | Candidate | Votes | % | ∆% |
|---|---|---|---|---|
| PAS | Mohd. Zain Abdullah | 15,925 | 52.08 | ▲1.36 |
| BN | Ghazali Awang Ibrahim | 14,651 | 47.92 | ▼1.36 |
| Total valid votes | | 30,576 | 100.00 | |
| Total rejected ballots | | 767 | | |
| Unreturned ballots | | 0 | | |
| Turnout | | 31,343 | 83.39 | ▲3.90 |
| Registered electors | | 37,586 | | |
| Majority | | 1,274 | 4.16 | ▲2.72 |
| PAS hold | | Swing | | |

Malaysian general election, 1978
| Party | Candidate | Votes | % | ∆% |
|---|---|---|---|---|
| PAS | Mohd. Zain Abdullah | 12,469 | 50.72 | ▲50.72 |
| BN | Hassan Harun | 12,113 | 49.28 | ▲49.28 |
| Total valid votes | | 24,582 | 100.00 | |
| Total rejected ballots | | 262 | | |
| Unreturned ballots | | 0 | | |
| Turnout | | 24,844 | 79.49 | |
| Registered electors | | 31,256 | | |
| Majority | | 356 | 1.44 | |
| PAS gain from BN | | Swing | | ? |

Malaysian general election, 1974
| Party | Candidate | Votes | % | ∆% |
|---|---|---|---|---|
On the nomination day, Mohd. Zain Abdullah won uncontested.
| BN | Mohd. Zain Abdullah | | | |
| Total valid votes | | | 100.00 | |
| Total rejected ballots | | | | |
| Unreturned ballots | | | | |
| Turnout | | | | |
| Registered electors | | 32,252 | | |
| Majority | | | | |
| BN gain from PMIP | | Swing | | ? |

Malaysian general election, 1969
| Party | Candidate | Votes | % | ∆% |
|---|---|---|---|---|
| PMIP | Mohd. Zain Abdullah | 13,069 | 54.43 | ▼3.45 |
| Alliance | Ahmad Idris | 10,943 | 45.57 | ▲3.45 |
| Total valid votes | | 24,012 | 100.00 | |
| Total rejected ballots | | 731 | | |
| Unreturned ballots | | 0 | | |
| Turnout | | 24,743 | 79.07 | |
| Registered electors | | 31,293 | | |
| Majority | | 2,126 | 8.86 | ▼6.90 |
| PMIP hold | | Swing | | |

Malaysian general by-election, 27 June 1964 Upon the death of incumbent, Zulkiflee Muhammad
| Party | Candidate | Votes | % | ∆% |
|---|---|---|---|---|
| PMIP | Abu Bakar Hamzah | 11,900 | 57.88 | ▼2.58 |
| Alliance | Abdul Ghani Fikri Sulaiman | 8,661 | 42.12 | ▲2.58 |
| Total valid votes | | 20,561 | 100.00 | |
| Total rejected ballots | | | | |
| Unreturned ballots | | | | |
| Turnout | | | | |
| Registered electors | | | | |
| Majority | | 3,239 | 15.76 | ▼5.16 |
| PMIP hold | | Swing | | |

Malaysian general election, 1964
| Party | Candidate | Votes | % | ∆% |
|---|---|---|---|---|
| PMIP | Zulkiflee Muhammad | 12,659 | 60.46 | ▼18.22 |
| Alliance | Hassan Mohamed | 8,278 | 39.54 | ▲18.22 |
| Total valid votes | | 20,937 | 100.00 | |
| Total rejected ballots | | 936 | | |
| Unreturned ballots | | 0 | | |
| Turnout | | 21,873 | 83.25 | ▲12.84 |
| Registered electors | | 26,274 | | |
| Majority | | 4,381 | 20.92 | ▼36.44 |
| PMIP hold | | Swing | | |

Malayan general election, 1959
| Party | Candidate | Votes | % |
|---|---|---|---|
| PMIP | Zulkiflee Muhammad | 13,880 | 78.68 |
| Alliance | Nik Mohamed Ali | 3,761 | 21.32 |
| Total valid votes | | 17,641 | 100.00 |
| Total rejected ballots | | 231 | |
| Unreturned ballots | | 0 | |
| Turnout | | 17,872 | 70.41 |
| Registered electors | | 25,382 | |
| Majority | | 10,119 | 57.36 |
This was a new constituency created.
