= Wan Martina =

Malaysian politician and doctor (born 1966)

Yang Berhormat Senator Wan Martina Wan Yusoff
- وان مرتينا وان يوسف

Senator

Elected by the Kelantan State Legislative Assembly
- Incumbent
- Assumed office 24 August 2024 Serving with Nik Mohamad Abduh (since 2023)
- Monarchs: Ibrahim (since 2024)
- Prime Minister: Ismail Sabri Yaakob (2021–2022); Anwar Ibrahim (since 2022)
- Preceded by: Asmak Husin
- In office 24 August 2021 – 23 August 2024 Serving with Mohd Apandi Mohamad (2021–2023)
- Monarchs: Abdullah (2021–2024)

Personal details
- Born: 9 November 1966 (age 59) Malaysia
- Citizenship: Malaysia
- Party: Malaysian Islamic Party (PAS)
- Other political affiliations: Perikatan Nasional (PN)
- Spouse: Zaira Azlan Zainudin
- Education: Universiti Malaya (UM)
- Occupation: Politician
- Profession: Physician

Wan Martina binti Wan Yusoff is a Malaysian medical practitioner and a politician who had served as a Senator since 2021. She was elected by the Kelantan State Legislative Assembly on 24 August 2021 after being nominated by then-Menteri Besar Ahmad Yakob. She replaced Asmak Husin, whose term ended on 30 June.

Prior to entering politics, she was the Chairwoman of Kelantan Prosperous Women Association (WANIS), as well as the Deputy Chairwoman of Dakwah Travel Mission Association (MKD). She is a registered physician at Klinik Perdana Ikhlas Jelawat in Bachok, Kelantan.

== Honours ==
- Malaysia
  - Recipient of the 17th Yang di-Pertuan Agong Installation Medal

== See also ==
- Members of the Dewan Negara, 14th Malaysian Parliament
- Members of the Dewan Negara, 15th Malaysian Parliament
