= Ahmed Ali =

Ahmed Ali is the name of:

== Sportspeople ==
- Ahmed Ali (Sudanese sprinter) (born 1993), Sudanese sprinter
- Ahmed Ali (Ghanaian sprinter) (born 1972), Ghanaian sprinter
- Ahmed Ali (handballer) (born 1973), Egyptian handballer
- Ahmed Ali (footballer, born 1986), Egyptian striker
- Ahmed Ali (footballer, born 1988), Egyptian defender
- Ahmed Ali (footballer, born 1990), Emirati forward
- Ahmed Abid Ali (born 1986), Iraqi football midfielder who played for Al Talaba in Iraq and the Iraq national team
- Ahmed Ibrahim Ali (born 1970), UAE football midfielder who played for United Arab Emirates in the 1996 Asian Cup and also for Al-Sharjah
- Ahmed Khalaf Ali, Egyptian Olympic gymnast
- Ahmed Abdulla Ali (born 1987), Bahraini footballer
- Ahmed Ali (Somali footballer) (born 1990)

== Others ==
- Ahmed Ali (Fijian politician) (1938–2005), Fijian academic and politician
- Ahmed Ali Ahmed, former leader of al-Qaeda in Iraq
- Ahmed Ali Butt (born 1975), Pakistani television actor, singer and model
- Ahmed Ali Lahori (1887–1962), Sufi Muslim scholar
- Ahmed Ali Moadhed (born 1980), Emirati footballer playing for Al Ain FC
- Ahmed Ali (writer) (1910–1994), Pakistani novelist and poet
- Ahmed Mohammed Ali (also known as Ahmed Ali, born 1972), Egyptian army spokesperson
- Ahmed Farah Ali (born 1948), Somali literary scholar and publisher of written folklore
- Ahmed Haj Ali, Eritrean politician who has held various posts within the Government of Eritrea
- Ahmed Thasmeen Ali (born 1967), leader of Dhivehi Rayyithunge Party, a Maldivian MP, philanthropist and businessman
- Ahmed Abdullah Ali, member of the 2006 transatlantic aircraft plot
- Ahmed Diriye Ali, spokesman of the Hawiye traditional elders
- Ahmed Ismail Ali (1917–1974), Commander-in-Chief of Egypt's army and minister of war during the October War of 1973
- Ahmed Khalfan Ali (born c. 1974), conspirator of the al-Qaeda terrorist organization
- Ahmed Ali (actor) (born 1986), Pakistani actor, model, singer and tennis player
- Ahmed Ali (Bangladeshi politician) (1932–2020), Bangladeshi politician and lawyer

== See also ==
- Ahmad Ali (disambiguation)
