= Ahmad Ali =

Ahmad Ali may refer to:

- Ahmad Ali (Arain politician) (1914–1980)
- Ahmad Ali (Indonesian politician) (born 1969)
- Ahmad Ali (Sindh politician)

== See also ==
- Ahmed Ali (disambiguation)
