= Mohd Syahir Che Sulaiman =

Malaysian politician

Yang Berhormat Tuan Mohd Syahir Che Sulaiman MP
- محمد شاهر چئ سليمان
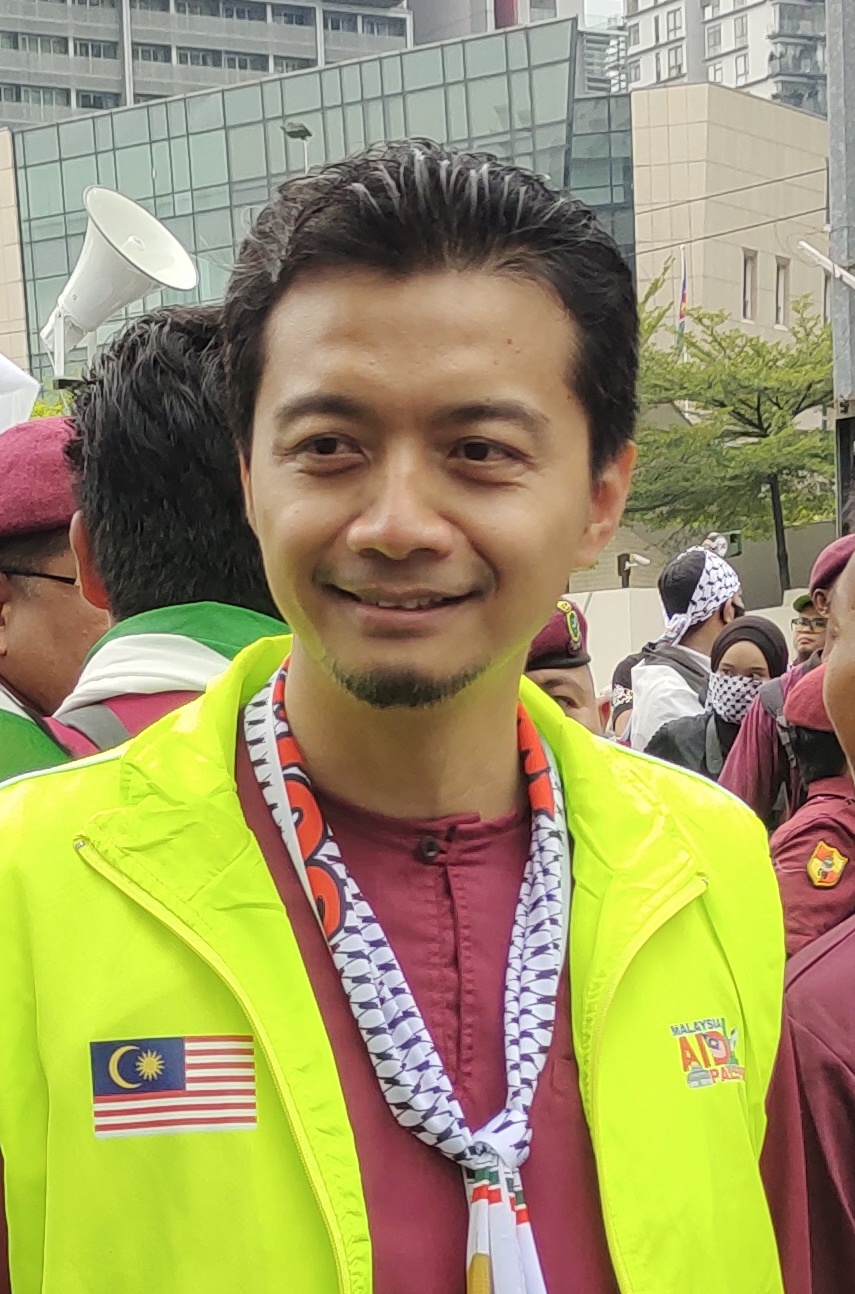
- Mohd Syahir in 2022

Member of the Malaysian Parliament for Bachok
- Incumbent
- Assumed office 19 November 2023
- Preceded by: Nik Mohamad Abduh Nik Abdul Aziz (PN–PAS)
- Majority: 29,901 (2022)

Personal details
- Born: Mohd Syahir bin Che Sulaiman; 30 March 1983 (age 43) Kota Bharu, Kelantan, Malaysia
- Citizenship: Malaysia
- Party: Malaysian Islamic Party (2008 - present)
- Other political affiliations: Pakatan Rakyat (PR) (2008–2015); Gagasan Sejahtera (GS) (2015–2020); Perikatan Nasional (PN) (2020–present)
- Education: International Islamic University Malaysia (BEcons); University of Malaya (MDS)
- Occupation: Politician
- Profession: Economic analyst
- Mohd Syahir Che Sulaiman on Facebook

Mohd Syahir bin Che Sulaiman (Jawi: محمد شهير بن چئ سليمان; born 30 March 1983) is a Malaysian politician and economic analyst who has served as the Member of Parliament (MP) for Bachok since November 2022. He is a member of the Malaysian Islamic Party (PAS), a component party of the Perikatan Nasional (PN) coalition. He has also been the Political Secretary to the President of PAS Abdul Hadi Awang, Deputy Chairman of the International Committee of PAS since 2019 and Assistant Secretary-General of PAS since 2020.

== Early life and education ==
Mohd Syahir attended secondary school at Izzuddin Shah School, Ipoh, Perak from 1996 to 2000. The following year, he continued his studies at the Matriculation Center of the International Islamic University Malaysia (IIUM) until 2002. Then he continued his Bachelor of Economics studies at IIUM until 2006. At IIUM, he graduated with First Class Honors. In 2013, he continued his postgraduate studies and obtained a master's degree in Development Studies from the University of Malaya (UM) in 2017.

== Early career ==
He was an intern at PricewaterhouseCoopers (PwC), a Big Four accounting firm operating in Kuala Lumpur. Immediately after graduation, he started his career as a management accountant at Shell Malaysia Exploration & Production (SMEP) operating in Sarawak, Malaysia. Later he served at Sime Darby as a Senior Executive, Corporate Finance and became a Special Officer to the Group chief operating officer. Next, he was given the responsibility of Assistant Vice President, Business Development and Strategic Planning at Sime Darby Property before becoming Assistant Vice President, Development Strategy (Malaysia Vision Valley) at the same company. He resigned from his position at Sime Darby Property when he was appointed as the Political Secretary to President of PAS in July 2018. He is also active in delivering motivational talks to school and university students as the motivational and career speaker.

He is also involved in volunteer and community activities as a disaster relief mission coordinator in charge of preaching and welfare at the charity department by serving as Miri Branch Charitable Foundation Coordinator, Serdang Concern Youth Club Advisor, Bandar Tun Hussein Onn Mosque Youth Bureau Head, and Al Amin Surau Secretary Sharp. In addition, he likes to share his views on political, economic and youth issues through writing articles and is often invited as a columnist and forum panelist at universities, think tanks and prime media channels.

== Political career ==
=== Member of Parliament (since 2022) ===
==== 2022 general election ====
In the 2022 general election, Mohd Syahir made his electoral debut after being nominated by PN to contest for the Bachok federal seat. He won the seat and was elected to Parliament as the Bachok MP after defeating Mohd Zain Yasim of Barisan Nasional (BN), Nor Azmiza Mamat of Pakatan Harapan (PH), independent candidate Mohd Zulkifli Zakaria and Kamarul Azam Osman of Gerakan Tanah Air (GTA) by a majority of 29,901 votes.

== Election results ==
Parliament of Malaysia
Year	Constituency	Candidate	Votes	Pct	Opponent(s)	Votes	Pct	Ballots cast	Majority	Turnout
2022	P025 Bachok	Mohd Syahir Che Sulaiman (PAS)	57,130	63.89%	Mohd Zain Yasim (UMNO)	27,229	30.45%	123,183	29,901	72.59%
2022	P025 Bachok	Mohd Syahir Che Sulaiman (PAS)	57,130	63.89%	Nor Azmiza Mamat (PKR)	4,366	4.88%	123,183	29,901	72.59%
2022	P025 Bachok	Mohd Syahir Che Sulaiman (PAS)	57,130	63.89%	Mohd Zulkifli Zakaria (IND)	418	0.47%	123,183	29,901	72.59%
2022	P025 Bachok	Mohd Syahir Che Sulaiman (PAS)	57,130	63.89%	Kamarul Azam Osman (PUTRA)	274	0.31%	123,183	29,901	72.59%

== Honours ==
=== Honours of Malaysia ===
- Malaysia
  - Recipient of the 17th Yang di-Pertuan Agong Installation Medal (2024)

== See also ==
- List of International Islamic University Malaysia alumni
