= Malaysian Islamic Party =

Islamist political party

Malaysian Islamic Party Parti Islam Se-Malaysia
- Abbreviation: PAS
- President: Abdul Hadi Awang
- Secretary-General: Takiyuddin Hassan
- Spokesperson: Ahmad Fadhli Shaari
- Spiritual Leader: Ahmad Yakob
- Deputy President and Vice Presidents: Tuan Ibrahim Tuan Man Ahmad Samsuri Mokhtar; Mohd Amar Abdullah; Idris Ahmad
- Dewan Ulamak Chief: Ahmad Yahaya
- Dewan Muslimat Chief: Nuridah Mohd Salleh
- Dewan Pemuda Chief: Afnan Hamimi Taib Azamudden
- Founder: Ahmad Fuad Hassan
- Founded: 24 November 1951; 74 years ago (as Pan-Malayan Islamic Union)
- Legalised: 31 May 1955; 71 years ago (as Pan-Malayan Islamic Party)
- Split from: United Malays National Organisation (UMNO)
- Headquarters: No. 318-A, Jalan Raja Laut, 50350 Kuala Lumpur, Malaysia
- Newspaper: Harakah
- Think tank: Pusat Penyelidikan PAS Pusat
- Youth wing: Dewan Pemuda PAS
- Women's wing: Dewan Muslimat PAS
- Cleric wing: Dewan Ulamak PAS
- Non-Muslim wing: Dewan Himpunan Penyokong PAS
- Student wing: Siswa PAS
- Membership: 1,005,700 (2022)
- Ideology: Islamism; Pan-Islamism; Ketuanan Melayu; Islamic nationalism; Islamic fundamentalism; Right-wing populism; Anti-Zionism; Anti-communism
- Political position: Far-right
- Religion: Sunni Islam
- National affiliation: Perikatan Nasional (since 2020) (Note: The party was formerly part of: Barisan Nasional (1973–1978) Harakah Keadilan Rakyat (1986–1990) Angkatan Perpaduan Ummah (1990–1996) Barisan Alternatif (1998–2004) Barisan Rakyat (2004–2008) Pakatan Rakyat (2008–2015) Gagasan Sejahtera (2016–2020) Muafakat Nasional (2019–2022) Ikatan Prihatin Rakyat (2025–2026) The party was aligned with Alliance (1972–1973) Through PN it is aligned with Barisan Nasional (2020–2022) and was aligned with Gabungan Parti Sarawak (2020–2022))
- International affiliation: Muslim Brotherhood
- Colours: Green and White
- Slogan: Istiqamah Sehingga Kemenangan; Islam Memimpin
- Anthem: Berjihadlah
- Dewan Negara: 7 / 70
- Dewan Rakyat: 43 / 222
- Dewan Undangan Negeri: 146 / 612
- Chief minister of states: 3 / 13

Election symbol
- except PAS Kelantan and Terengganu PAS Kelantan and Terengganu only

Party flag

Website
- www.pas.org.my

The Malaysian Islamic Party, also known as the Pan-Malaysian Islamic Party (Malay: Parti Islam Se-Malaysia, PAS), is an Islamist political party in Malaysia. Ideologically focused on Islamic fundamentalism and Malay dominance, PAS's electoral base is largely centered around Peninsular Malaysia's rural northern and east coast regions particularly the states of Kelantan, Terengganu, Perlis, and Kedah. They also gained significant support in the rural areas of Perak and Pahang in the 2022 general election and the 2023 state elections, which was dubbed the "Green Wave".

The party is a founding and principal component of the Perikatan Nasional (PN) coalition, which was part of the federal government from 2020 to 2022. The party governs either solely or as coalition partners in the states of Kelantan, Terengganu, Kedah and Perlis. In the past, it was a coalition partner in the state governments of Penang and Selangor as part of the federal opposition between 2008 and 2018.

Since the 2022 general election, the party holds 43 of the 222 seats in the federal Dewan Rakyat, being the largest individual party, and has elected parliamentarians or state assembly members in 12 of the country's 13 states. Internationally, PAS is affiliated with the Muslim Brotherhood.

== History ==
=== Origins ===
The post-World War II period, while Malaya was still under British colonial rule, saw the emergence of the country's first formal Islamic political movements. The Malay Nationalist Party (MNP), a left-wing nationalist organisation, was formed in October 1945 and led by Burhanuddin al-Helmy, who would later become the third president of PAS. Out of the MNP arose the Pan Malayan Supreme Islamic Council (Majlis Agama Tertinggi Sa-Malaya or MATA) in 1947, and MATA in turn formed the party Hizbul Muslimin (Muslim People's Party of Malaya) in 1948. The central aim of Hizbul Muslimin was the establishment of an independent Malaya as an Islamic state. However, the party did not live beyond 1948. The Malayan Emergency of that year, while a British–Communist dispute, saw the colonial administration arrest a number of the party's leaders, and the nascent group disbanded. Nevertheless, the party served as a forerunner to PAS, supplying both the ideology upon which PAS was formed and some of PAS's key leaders in its early years.

=== Party formation ===
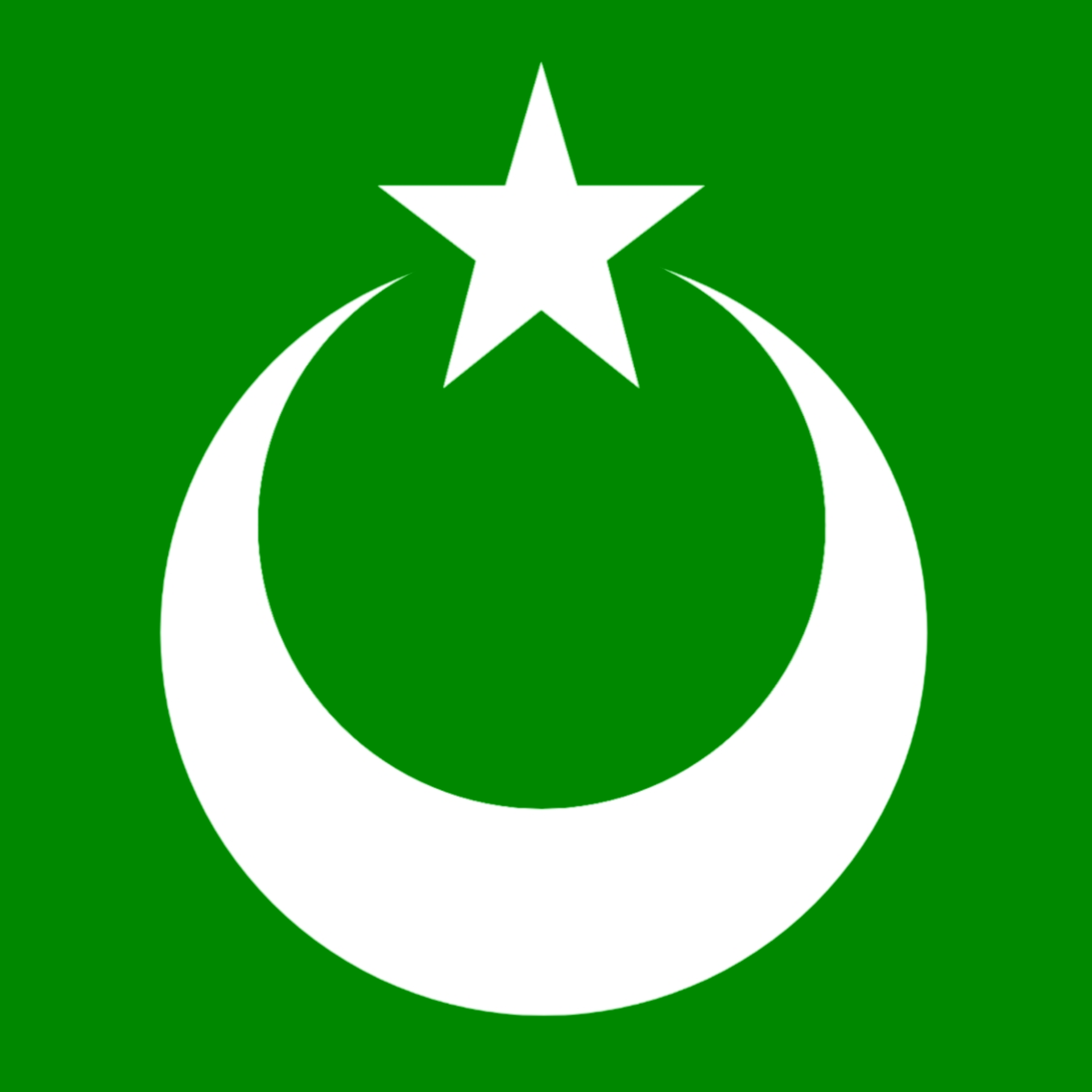
the old PAS logo before it was banned by The Registry of Societies Malaysia (ROS) in 1971

PAS was founded on 24 November 1951, as the Persatuan Islam Sa-Malaya (Pan Malayan Islamic Union) at a meeting in Butterworth, Penang. Shortly after it was renamed Persatuan Islam sa-Tanah Melayu (Tanah Melayu means "Land of the Malays" and was used instead of Malaya as "Malaya" had colonial connotations). In English, it became known as the Pan Malayan Islamic Party (PMIP) before the 1955 election as the registrar of society required it to incorporate the word "party" into its name. Its acronym PAS, originally used in Malay but became more widely adopted in the 1970s, is based the written form in Jawi (ڤاس).

The formation of the party was the culmination of a growing desire among Muslim clerics within the United Malays National Organisation to formalise a discrete Islamic political organisation. However, the lines between UMNO and the new party were initially blurred. PAS allowed dual membership of both parties, and many of its early senior leaders were also UMNO members. The party's first president was Ahmad Fuad Hassan, an UMNO cleric. He lasted in the position only until 1953, when he fell out of favour with the party, which was now developing a more distinct identity, and returned to the UMNO fold. Fuad's departure coincided with the end of dual membership. The party turned to Abbas Alias, a Western-educated medical doctor, as its second president, although he did not play an active role in the party and was little more than a nominal figurehead.

The party's first electoral test was the pre-independence 1955 election to the Federal Legislative Council, the body that preceded the national parliament. 52 single-member seats were up for election; PAS fielded 11 candidates. Hampered by a lack of funds and party organisation, PAS succeeded in having only one candidate elected: Ahmad Tuan Hussein, a teacher at an Islamic school in Kerian, Perak. He was the only opposition member of the council; the other 51 seats were won by members of the Alliance coalition between UMNO, the Malaysian Chinese Association and the Malaysian Indian Congress. PAS' performance in the election weakened its hand in negotiations with the British over the terms of Malayan independence. Its advocacy for the protection of Malay and Muslim rights, including the recognition of Islam as the country's official religion, was ignored. Alias stepped down from the presidency in 1956, handing it voluntarily to the radical nationalist Burhanuddin al-Helmy. This change exemplified a broader trend among PAS's leadership in the late 1950s: the party's upper echelons gradually became filled with nationalists and long-time UMNO opponents, replacing the UMNO clerics who had initially led the party.

=== Left-wing Islamism ===
Burhanuddin al-Helmy, a prominent anti-colonialist, steered PAS in a socialist and nationalist direction and set about strengthening the party's internal structure and geographic reach. In the 1959 election, Malaya's first since independence, the party's focus on rural constituencies, especially in the north, paid off. Thirteen PAS candidates were elected to the 104-member House of Representatives, and the party took control of the legislative assemblies of the northern states of Kelantan and Terengganu.

However, Burhanuddin's leftist pan-Islamism, under which PAS sought greater ties between the Muslim peoples of Malaya and the Indonesian archipelago, soon led the party into a wedge. The Indonesia–Malaysia confrontation of 1963–66 turned popular Malayan opinion against Indonesia. PAS's attacks on Tunku Abdul Rahman's Alliance government for seeking Western assistance during the confrontation, and the party's continued support for Southeast Asian pan-Islamism, led to a loss of support in the 1964 election. The party's parliamentary cohort was reduced to nine. The party became further marginalised the following year, when Burhanuddin was detained without trial under the Internal Security Act on allegations that he had collaborated with Indonesia.

Political circumstances in the country had changed by the 1969 election. The Konfrontasi had ended, Burhanuddin had been released from custody but was too ill to campaign actively, and the Alliance coalition was suffering from internal division as well as unpopularity. PAS' vote rose to over 20 percent of the national electorate, netting the party 12 seats in Parliament. However, the parliament would not convene until 1971 as the 13 May race riots resulted in the declaration of a state of emergency. The country would be run by a National Operations Council for the following two years. In the meantime, Burhanuddin died in October 1969 and was replaced as PAS' president by his deputy, Asri Muda.

=== Pivot to Malay nationalism ===
Asri came to the presidency having been PAS's de facto leader during Burhanuddin's long illness. But this did not mean a seamless transition for the party. While Burhanuddin had been sympathetic to left-wing causes and parties in Malaysia, Asri was first and foremost a Malay nationalist, and was hostile to leftist politics. One of his first acts as President of PAS was to part ways with the party's opposition allies on the left, such as the Malaysian People's Party. Ideologically, Asri's presidency would see the party shift markedly away from the pan-Islamism of Burhanuddin. The party became principally concerned with the protection and advancement of the rights of ethnic Malays. The party's activities also became solely focused on party politics, as reflected in the change of its Malay name in 1972 from the "Persatuan Islam sa-Tanah Melayu " (Pan-Tanah Melayu Islamic Association) to the "Parti Islam Se-Malaysia" (Pan-Malaysian Islamic Party, but commonly referred to as Parti Islam, or PAS).

However, Asri's most radical change was still to come. In January 1972, he announced that PAS would be joining the Alliance coalition (which would soon rebrand itself as Barisan Nasional) as a junior partner to its main rival UMNO. The move was controversial within PAS, and some of its members and senior leaders either left the party or were purged by Asri. Asri's principal justification for joining UMNO in a coalition government was that after the 1969 race riots, Malay unity was paramount, and that this required a partnership between the country's two ethnic-Malay political parties. Asri himself was given a ministerial position in the cabinet of prime minister Abdul Razak Hussein.

The 1974 election saw PAS competing under the Barisan Nasional banner for the first and only time. The party won 14 parliamentary seats to UMNO's 62, cementing PAS's position as the junior of the coalition partners. PAS also found itself governing in coalition in Kelantan, which it had previously governed in its own right. PAS's vote in its northern strongholds was weakened by a loss of support to both its former opposition allies and renegade PAS candidates running on anti-Barisan Nasional tickets. Ultimately, it was Kelantan, Asri's home state and the base of political power, that would trigger the downfall of the UMNO–PAS partnership. After a conflict between Asri and the UMNO-favoured chief minister of the state, Mohamed Nasir, over investigations that Nasir initiated into Asri's financial dealings, Asri mobilised the PAS members of the Kelantan State Legislative Assembly to move a no-confidence motion against Nasir. The UMNO assemblymen staged a walk-out, abandoning Asri, driving an irreparable wedge through the coalition and causing a political crisis in the state. The federal government declared an emergency in the state, allowing it to take control. Asri withdrew PAS from Barisan Nasional in December 1977.

The 1978 election underscored how disastrous PAS's foray into the Barisan Nasional had been. The party was reduced to five parliamentary seats and, in separate state-level elections in Kelantan, was routed by UMNO and the Pan-Malaysian Islamic Front (BERJASA), which Nasir had founded after leaving PAS. The party's fortunes in the Kelantan election were not helped by a ban on public election rallies; while the Barisan Nasional was able to campaign through a compliant mass media, public talks were the principal way in which PAS could reach voters. PAS fared little better in the 1982 election. In the face of a new prime minister, Mahathir Mohamad, and the decision of the popular Islamist youth leader Anwar Ibrahim to join UMNO instead of PAS, the party was unable to improve on its five parliamentary seats and failed to regain government in Kelantan. Meanwhile, the 1978 to 1982 period coincided with the rise of a new generation of leaders within the party, including foreign-educated Muslim clerics (or "ulama") such as Nik Abdul Aziz Nik Mat and Abdul Hadi Awang. This group sought to reorient PAS as an Islamist party and were fundamentally hostile to UMNO, whose Malay nationalist focus they saw to be at the expense of Islam. In 1980 the group succeeded in electing Yusof Rawa to the deputy presidency of the party, ousting the Asri loyalist Abu Bakar Omar. By the time of PAS's 1982 assembly, it was clear to Asri that the ulama faction had the numbers to defeat him. He resigned on the floor of the assembly, and subsequently attacked the party through the media, leading to his expulsion and the formation of splinter party, Parti Hizbul Muslimin Malaysia (HAMIM) by Asri in 1983. The following year, in 1983, Yusof was elevated to the presidency, unopposed.

=== Ulama takeover ===
The ulama who took over PAS in 1982 drew from the 1979 Iranian revolution for inspiration in establishing an Islamic state; Yusof Rawa himself had served as Malaysia's Ambassador to Iran in the years preceding the revolution. Yusof openly rejected the Malay nationalism that characterised both UMNO and PAS under Asri Muda, considering it a narrow and ignorant philosophy that was contrary to the concept of a Muslim ummah. As if to exemplify the shift in the party's ideological outlook under Yusof and his ulama colleagues, the party's new leaders adopted a more conservative and religious form of dress, abandoning Malay and western clothing for traditional Arab religious garb. Politics between UMNO and PAS became increasingly religious in nature. The Barisan Nasional government tried to counter the possible electoral appeal of PAS's Islamisation by creating a number of state-run Islamic institutions, such as the International Islamic University of Malaysia. PAS leaders responded by labelling such initiatives as superficial and hypocritical, UMNO leaders as "infidels", and UMNO as the "party of the devil".

The increasingly divisive rhetoric between UMNO and PAS produced deep divisions in Malay communities, especially in the northern states. Sometimes the divisions became violent, the most infamous example being the 1985 Memali incident, in which the government sanctioned a raid on a village led by the PAS cleric Ibrahim Libya, which left 14 civilians and four policemen dead. It was against this backdrop that the PAS ulama faced their first general election in 1986. The result was a whitewash for the Barisan Nasional coalition. PAS recorded its worst-ever election result, retaining only one seat in Parliament. PAS, in recovering from the defeat, had no choice but to retreat from its hardline Islamism and pursue a moderate course. By 1989, Yusof had become too ill to remain as PAS's president, and was replaced by his deputy, Fadzil Noor, another member of the ulama faction that now dominated the party.

=== Electoral revival in the 1990s ===
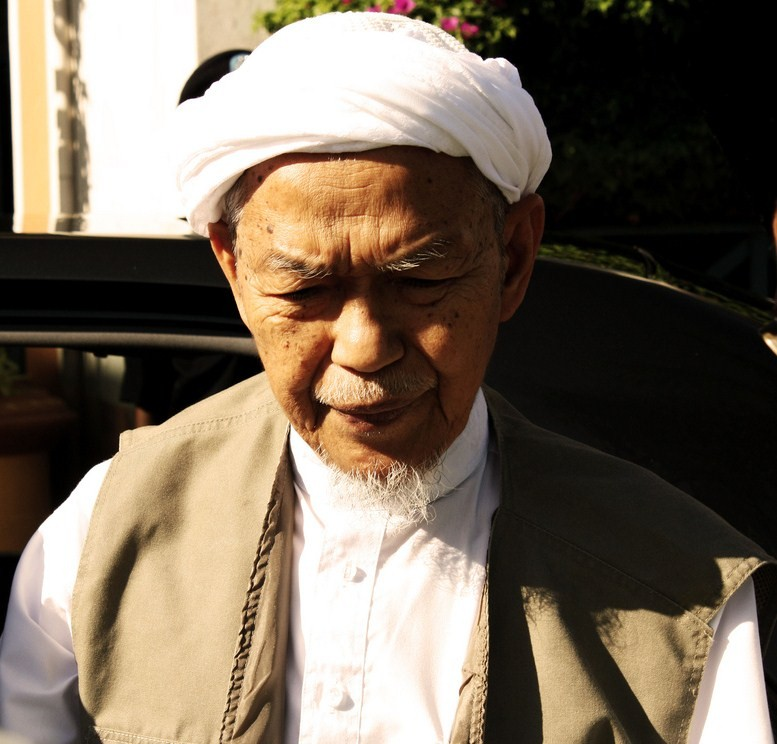
Nik Abdul Aziz Nik Mat became the Menteri Besar (Chief Minister) of Kelantan in 1990, and remained in the post for 23 years.

While not abandoning PAS's ideological commitment to the establishment of an Islamic state, Fadzil Noor moderated the party's rhetoric. He also set about infusing the party's membership with young urban professionals in an attempt to diversify the leadership ranks beyond religious clerics. The 1990s also saw PAS engage in international Islamist movements. Abdul Hadi Awang became active in a number of international Islamic organisations and delegations, and Islamist parties abroad sent delegations to Malaysia to observe PAS.

The first electoral test of Fadzil's presidency was the 1990 election, which occurred against the backdrop of a split in UMNO out of which the Semangat 46 opposition party was formed. PAS joined Semangat 46 and two other Malay parties in the United Ummah Front ("Angkatan Perpaduan Ummah"), and won seven parliamentary seats. The new coalition swept the Barisan Nasional from power in Kelantan, winning all of its state assembly seats. Nik Abdul Aziz Nik Mat, a cleric who played a leading role in the 1982 takeover of the party, became Kelantan's Chief Minister, and would remain in the position until his retirement in 2013. One of the first acts of the PAS-led government in Kelantan was to seek to introduce hudud, a criminal punishment system for particular Islamic offences. The move was abandoned after it became clear that the law could not be enforced over the objections of the federal government.

PAS retained its seven parliamentary seats and the government of Kelantan in the 1995 election while all other opposition parties lost ground. By the time of the next election in 1999, circumstances external to PAS had changed its fortunes for the better. The 1997 Asian financial crisis split the Barisan Nasional government between supporters of the Prime Minister, Mahathir Mohamad, and his deputy, Anwar Ibrahim. Mahathir's sacking and subsequent detention without trial of Anwar in 1998 provoked widespread opposition, which PAS capitalised on more than any other opposition party. The party ran a sophisticated campaign for the 1999 election, taking advantage of the internet to bypass restrictions on print publications and managing to woo urban professional voters while retaining its traditional rural support base. For the first time, PAS joined the centre-left and secular Democratic Action Party in the Barisan Alternatif coalition which included the new party Keadilan, which was formed by Wan Azizah Wan Ismail, the wife of the now imprisoned Anwar. It resulted in PAS's second best electoral performance (behind those of 2022 general election). The party took 27 of 192 parliamentary seats and had landslide state-level victories in Kelantan and Terengganu.

=== PAS in the Pakatan Rakyat ===
The death of Fadzil Noor in 2002, and his replacement by the conservative cleric Abdul Hadi Awang, coincided with a period of division within the party between its younger and professional leaders, who sought to make PAS's Islamist ideology more appealing to mainstream Malaysia, and its conservative, and generally older, clerics. The party was unable to reconcile the views of the two factions with a coherent definition of the "Islamic state" that the party's platform envisioned. The debate itself caused the DAP to break with the Barisan Alternatif coalition; as a secular party with mainly an ethnic Chinese support base, it could not support the vision of an Islamic state propagated by PAS's conservatives. PAS also found itself losing Malay support following the replacement of Mahathir as Prime Minister with Abdullah Badawi, a popular and moderate Muslim, and post-September 11 fears among the electorate about radical Islam in Southeast Asia. If the 1999 election had been the party's zenith, the 2004 poll was one of the lowest points in its history. In an expanded Parliament, PAS was reduced to seven seats. Abdul Hadi not only lost his parliamentary seat but saw the government he led in Terengganu thrown from office after one term.

The response of PAS to the 2004 election, like its response to the similar 1986 wipeout, was to abandon the hardline image that had contributed to its defeat. By now, the urban professional wing of the party's membership, brought into the party by Fadzil Noor in the 1990s, was ready to take charge. While Abdul Hadi's presidency was not under threat, the moderate faction, known as the "Erdogans" after the moderate Turkish Islamist leader Recep Tayyip Erdogan, had its members voted into other key positions in the party's 2005 general assembly. PAS was now able to attack Abdullah Badawi's government from both the right and the left: on the one hand, it criticised Abdullah's promotion of Islam Hadhari as a watered-down version of Islam; on the other, it attacked the government for its human rights record and promoted the causes of social and economic justice, including for non-Muslims. The party also capitalised on the growth of the internet and social media in Malaysia to bypass the pro-government mass media.

Ahead of the 2008 election PAS joined the DAP and Anwar Ibrahim's Keadilan, which was now known as People's Justice Party (PKR) in a new coalition, Pakatan Rakyat. The coalition handed the Barisan Nasional its worst-ever election result. Barisan Nasional lost its two-thirds majority in the House of Representatives, disabling it from passing constitutional amendments without opposition support. PAS won 23 seats; the Pakatan Rakyat as a whole won 82. At state level, decades-old Barisan Nasional governments fell in Kedah, Perak and Selangor. PAS now governed Kedah and Kelantan (led respectively by Azizan Abdul Razak and Nik Abdul Aziz Nik Mat) and supplied the Chief Minister of Perak (Nizar Jamaluddin) in a Pakatan Rakyat coalition government.

PAS's 2009 general assembly saw latent fissures within the party come out into the open. The incumbent deputy president Nasharudin Mat Isa, a Malay nationalist who promoted greater co-operation between PAS and UMNO, was challenged by two moderate candidates. Nasharudin survived with the backing of the conservative ulama faction; his two opponents had split the moderate vote. But at the 2011 assembly, Nasharudin was not so lucky: Mohamad Sabu, a leading moderate close to Anwar Ibrahim, commanded the support of the "Erdogan" wing and toppled him. Sabu's election was a significant defeat for the ulama faction. He was the first non-cleric to serve as the party's deputy president in over 20 years.

The Pakatan Rakyat coalition went into the 2013 election facing Najib Razak, who had replaced Abdullah as Prime Minister in 2009 but failed to improve the government's fortunes, especially among urban voters. PAS made a concerted effort to expand its voter base beyond the northern peninsula states, and campaigned heavily in Johor, where it had never won a parliamentary seat. The election witnessed a significant degree of cross-over ethnic voting: Chinese voters in Malay-majority seats decided in large numbers to support PAS, to maximise the chances of a national Pakatan Rakyat victory. Pakatan Rakyat garnered 50.8 percent of the national popular vote but could not win a majority in parliament. PAS, however, suffered a net loss of two parliamentary seats. This was principally attributable to a swing against the party in Kedah, where the party was removed from state government after one term and lost four parliamentary seats.

=== Splintering and right-ward shift ===
When PAS saw its share of seats shrink in the 2013 election, it started to reassert its Islamic agenda. The passing of spiritual leader Nik Abdul Aziz Nik Mat in 2015 –who was known to be sympathetic and friendly to non-Malays and non-Muslims– shifted PAS more to the right-wing. In the meantime, DAP criticised its president Abdul Hadi Awang for pushing a bill on hudud without consulting his opposition partners. This incident led to the DAP announcing in March 2015 that it would no longer work with the PAS leader. The rift worsened after conservatives captured PAS leadership, as progressive leaders endorsed by the late Nik Aziz were voted out of office in party elections, characterised by the media as an intentional wipe out and purge, members of this progressive faction left and splintered as the National Trust Party (Parti Amanah Negara, PAN) helmed by Mohamad Sabu. The now purged PAS accepted a motion by its conservative ulama wing to sever ties with DAP. In response, DAP's Secretary-General Lim Guan Eng said that the Pakatan Rakyat coalition had ceased to exist. The coalition was replaced by Pakatan Harapan, which the newly formed PAN joined as a founding member.

The party formed Gagasan Sejahtera with Malaysia National Alliance Party (IKATAN) in 2016, with BERJASA joining the coalition the same year. The coalition entered the 2018 Malaysian general election using the PAS logo and contested 158 seats, with PAS contesting 155 of them. The coalition was able to win 18 parliamentary seats as well as wrangle control of the state of Terrenganu from BN, which PAS had last ruled in 2004, in addition to retaining control of Kelantan and denying the BN state government a supermajority in Pahang. They also managed to flip a large number of state seats held by BN in Kedah. However, PAS was the only party from the coalition to win any seats as both BERJASA and IKATAN remained without representation.

In 2018, following then-prime minister Mahathir Mohamad's announcement that the federal government intended to "ratify all remaining core UN instruments related to the protection of human rights", including International Convention on the Elimination of All Forms of Racial Discrimination (ICERD) and other five previously unratified conventions at a United Nations General Assembly, UMNO, PAS, and various non-governmental organisations staged what became known as the anti-ICERD Rally, protesting what they saw as a threat to the special position of the Malays, Bumiputera and Islam within the country; all of which are enshrined within the federal constitution.

=== Coalition government, largest party in parliament ===
During the 2020–2022 Malaysian political crisis, sparked by Mahathir's abrupt resignation and his party's exit from the Pakatan Harapan coalition, PAS initially pledged its support for Mahathir to remain as prime minister as part of an alternative coalition to Pakatan Harapan, specifically excluding DAP. When Mahathir revealed his intentions to form a broad unity government, the party, alongside UMNO, with which it had formed an alliance known as National Concord in 2019, retracted their support and called for the dissolution of parliament. Ultimately, PAS entered the federal government as part of Perikatan Nasionalunder prime minister Muhyiddin Yassin and later Ismail Sabri Yaakob.

In the Muhyiddin cabinet, three ministerial and five deputy ministerial positions were allocated to PAS members of parliament.

In the 2022 general election, PAS emerged as the largest party in parliament with 43 seats. However, the Perikatan Nasional alliance as a whole only managed to secure 74 seats, coming in second. Unlike its erstwhile ally UMNO, the party refused to join the "unity government" formed by Anwar Ibrahim. PAS gained its first elected representative in East Malaysia in the 2025 Sabah state election.

PAS entered Sarawak on 22 September 1996 and first contested in the 2001 Sarawak state election. Its first registered area was in Petra Jaya with a total of 1,000 members in Sarawak. As of 2019, the total party members increased to 3,000 with 11 registered areas. As of 2026, the Sarawak branch of PAS claimed to have 6,000 to 8,000 party members, with 1,500 to 2,000 members concentrated in the Batang Lupar federal constituency. In 2026, PAS decided not to contest in the Sarawak state election following the lead of its coalition partner Barisan Nasional's decision of not contesting in the state election, honouring a political understanding between United Malays National Organisation (UMNO) and Sarawak’s main ruling party, Parti Pesaka Bumiputera Bersatu (PBB).

=== Controversies ===
==== Militia Parade Incident ====
The Terengganu police have announced an investigation into a controversial parade organised by the local PAS Youth group, which took place on 19 February 2023. The police were initially informed about the march but were not aware that some supporters would be carrying replica weapons, raising concerns among certain groups. DCP Datuk Rohaimi Md Isa, the police chief, stated that preliminary investigations will be conducted to determine whether any offences were committed during the event, and appropriate action will be taken accordingly.

Images circulating on social media showed members of Terengganu PAS Youth dressed in medieval Islamic war attire and wielding fake swords, spears, and shields. The parade was reportedly part of a two-day gathering called "Himpunan Pemuda Islam Terengganu" (Himpit), held at a resort in Setiu, Terengganu. Religious Affairs Minister Datuk Dr Mohd Na'im Mokhtar criticised the parade, stating that it presented an inappropriate image of Islam and emphasising the importance of promoting peace and unity in society. He also called for authorities to investigate any potential legal violations.

Furthermore, social media photos depicted a pickup truck carrying a large fake sword, with youths dressed in militant costumes standing on its cargo bed while it was in motion.

==== Unconstitutional Kelantan Syariah Law amendment ====
Sisters in Islam had criticized PAS for unconstitutional Shariah enactment on the recent update of the Shariah law of the Kelantan penal code including:

- attempting to convert out of Islam
- distortion of Islamic teachings
- disrespecting the month of Ramadan
- destroying houses of worship
- disobeying parents
- tattooing
- undergoing plastic surgery.

This has sparked another controversy where the punishments include a jail term of not more than three years and a fine of up to RM5,000 or six strokes of the cane, and that the punishment is categorized under ta'zir (crimes with discretionary punishments) and not under hudud (Islamic Penal Code).

==== Flight attendant uniform criticism ====
PAS had sparked another controversy where several of its lawmakers criticised flight stewardess uniform attire they claimed that it is "too revealing" and added that flight stewardesses must be allowed to wear a hijab. Following those two statements, Sisters in Islam (SIS) said the issue had taken priority over other concerns somehow and they claim that ministerial directives should not interfere with a company's policy which may subject to extra rebranding and production costs unless there were issues of safety, health and security. National Union of Flight Attendants Malaysia vice secretary-general S Shashi Kumar also publicly stated that this complaint is "nonsensical" when he said the baju kebaya has become a fashion statement in southeast Asia. He said, "Royal Brunei Airlines, Singapore Airlines and Garuda Indonesia have adopted the baju kebaya as the uniform for their female flight attendants." Transport minister Anthony Loke had said "We are aware that this is not a new policy and there is nothing new, but there are no plans to change the existing policies on the dressing of stewards and stewardesses. The image and outfit depend on the airline company.".He added that "The Ministry has no restriction if Muslim air stewardesses choose to wear attire that is Syariah compliant as long as it fulfils the criteria set by CAAM," It looks like PAS leaders lack knowledge of the Malay heritage and criticising their traditional attire, responded the Global Human Rights Federation.

==== Timah whiskey ====
Following the fame of Malaysia's local liquor company, Timah Whiskey after winning two silver medals in the Tasting Awards for the International Spirits Challenge 2020 (ISC) as well as the Annual San Francisco World Spirits Competition 2020 (SFWSC), PAS urged Ismail Sabri Yaakob's Cabinet for the company to be shut down stating that it "to prevent triggering the sensitivity of Muslims in the country" and "to avoid a precedent of new liquor companies emerging". PAS also states that they had to face numerous severe backlash. PAS Deputy President, Tuan Ibrahim Tuan Man, said that "We have always been consistent in our stance against alcohol because it is clear that it is haram according to the Quran."

The request was denied by Ismail Sabri Yaakob's Cabinet where they had decided to rule against the decision. Prime Minister Ismail Sabri Yaakob state that the "cannot cause concern to the people in the context of race and religion". PAS Deputy President, Tuan Ibrahim Tuan Man, states "For me, the 'people's anxiety' can be considered as 'the confusion of the people, especially the Malay-Muslims'". Tuan Ibrahim was also reported by the media on October 19 as saying that the brand and logo of Timah whiskey "can be confusing" and asked for it to be reviewed.

==== English language criticism ====
PAS president Abdul Hadi Awang has claimed that people who advocate for the English language to be taught in Malaysia are "stuck in a colonial mindset". Expanding on this point, he said such Malaysians seemed to be embarrassed to use their national language (Malay) and had placed greater importance on English. In the PAS party newspaper, Harakah, Hadi wrote an article titled "Ignore the delirious voices which are trying to reduce the importance of the Malay language" where in it he stated that such advocates "are behaving like slaves to the former colonial masters despite having been freed from their clutches". Additionally in the same article he further went on to say that "advertisements in shops and the market, as well as the names of cities and roads, are named in English even though a majority of its target audience does not know English, at the same time, they do not care about whether their audiences consist of Malaysians who do not know English".

== Ideology ==
flag of PAS, occasionally flown along the official full-moon-on-a-green-field flag

According to Farish A. Noor, a Malaysian academic who has written a complete history of PAS:

From the day PAS was formed, in November 1951, the long-term goal of creating an Islamic state in Malaysia has been the beacon that has driven successive generations of PAS leaders and members ever forward. What has changed is the meaning and content of the signifier 'Islamic state'

From time to time, PAS's pursuit of an "Islamic state" has involved attempts to legislate for hudud—an Islamic criminal justice system—in the states that it governs. Such laws would apply to all Muslims and would not apply to non-Muslims. PAS-dominated state assemblies in Kelantan and Terengganu passed hudud laws in the early 1990s and early 2000s respectively, although neither has ever been enforced due to opposition from the federal government. PAS returned to its pursuit of hudud laws after the 2013 election, signalling that it would table bills in the federal Parliament to allow the laws, still on the statute books in Kelantan, to be enforced. The bills would require a two-thirds majority in the Parliament as they involve constitutional amendments.

After PAS's electoral rout in 2004, the party sought to broaden its policies beyond Islamism. Among other things, the party focused on calling for improved civil liberties and race relations. However, these policy shifts have proven controversial within the party; conservatives have considered them part of a dilution of PAS's commitment to an Islamic state.

When PAS was defeated in Terengganu, enforcement of female dress codes was reduced. The state PAS government in Kelantan banned traditional Malay dance theatres, banned advertisements depicting women who are not fully clothed, and enforced the wearing of headscarves. However, they allowed gender-segregated cinemas and concerts. Some government-controlled bodies pressure non-Muslims also to wear headscarves, and all students of the International Islamic University of Malaysia and female officers in the Royal Malaysian Police are required to wear headscarves in public ceremonies.

The PAS party wishes that the death penalty be enacted for Muslims who attempt to convert, as part of their ultimate desire to turn Malaysia into an Islamic state. The party is also against the government-backed wave of Anti-Shi'a persecution.

=== Connections with the Muslim Brotherhood ===
PAS has also maintained close personal and ideological ties with the Egyptian Muslim Brotherhood. The party's relationship with the Muslim Brotherhood dates back to the 1940s when PAS's founders were exposed to the ideas and teachings of the Muslim Brotherhood while they were studying in Cairo during the 1940s. According to Wan Saiful Wan Jan of the think tank Institute for Democracy and Economic Affairs, the Muslim Brotherhood regards PAS as a model for a successful Muslim political party; since PAS has governed the state of Kelantan continually since 1990. PAS representatives are often invited to Muslim Brotherhood speaking engagements overseas. In 2012, PAS President Abdul Hadi Awang spoke alongside Muslim Brotherhood scholar Sheikh Yusuf al-Qaradawi at a speaking event in London. That same year, PAS representatives met with Muslim Brotherhood leaders Sheikh Mahdi Akif and Dr Muhammad Badie in Cairo.

According to Müller, PAS's current generation of leaders, the Ulama Leadership (Kepimpinan Ulama) was also influenced by Muslim Brotherhood ideology while studying in Egypt, Saudi Arabia and India during the 1980s. Muslim Brotherhood–inspired Islamic education methods (tarbiyah) and regular study circles (usrah/halaqah) were systematically introduced while networks were established with Muslim political parties and movements abroad. In April 2014, Awang criticised the governments of Saudi Arabia, Bahrain, and the United Arab Emirates for designating the Muslim Brotherhood as a terrorist organisation. In January 2016, former PAS leader Mujahid Yusof Rawa claimed that the Muslim Brotherhood's influence on PAS was limited to sharing the organisation's views on the role of Islam in society. Rawa also claimed that other local Muslim groups such as Angkatan Belia Islam Malaysia (ABIM; Muslim Youth Movement of Malaysia) and IKRAM were also sympathetic to the Muslim Brotherhood.

=== Support for the Taliban ===
After the Taliban took over Kabul in 2021 and re-established an Islamic theocracy in Afghanistan, PAS international affairs and external relations committee chairman, Muhammad Khalil Abdul Hadi (also the son of the incumbent PAS president), congratulated the Islamist militant group for "successfully achieving victory for their country" on Twitter and Facebook, stating its liberation from Western powers.

The victory and 'independence' achieved this time is the result of the efforts of all Afghans to liberate their homeland which for 20 years has been colonised and invaded without mercy and humanity that almost destroyed Afghanistan.

— Muhammad Khalil Abdul Hadi, PAS international affairs and external relations committee chairman, Harakah

In August 2021, Khalil also added that the Taliban had also become more moderate, spuriously claiming that women's rights (including women's freedom of movement) and the opportunities for women in the workforce were preserved. The unsubstantiated comments were widely condemned by numerous Malaysian social media users, and Muhammad Khalil Abdul Hadi's pro-Taliban posts on Facebook and Twitter were taken down in response. In March 2022, numerous independent news reports indicated that women and girls in Afghanistan were deprived (by decrees from the Taliban) from their ability to work, study or move freely within the country.

In October 2021, the leader of PAS's youth wing, Khairil Nizam Khirudin, proposed closer ties between PAS and the Taliban. He claimed that if China was able build ties with the Taliban, Malaysia should also do so.

In August 2021, PAS president Abdul Hadi Awang alleged that Western media had made false accusations against the Taliban to advance an Islamophobic agenda, without studying and fully understanding the religion of Islam. He also repeated the Taliban claim that the Taliban had provided broad amnesty to government officials of the toppled Islamic Republic of Afghanistan; this claim was disputed as numerous independent reports with evidence indicated that the Taliban instead conducted enforced disappearances, summary executions and revenge killings against the former government officials. In the same article, Abdul Hadi Awang also alleged that the Taliban undertook a celebratory approach to the diversity of society within a multi-ethnic Afghanistan; this claim was also disputed as numerous evident news reports indicated that the Taliban engaged in the persecution of Hazaras (who numerous Taliban fighters deem as heretical), censorship against journalists and the news media, violence against journalists, arbitrary arrest and detention, political repression. Most notably, anyone from a religious minority who was an apostate of Islam is sentenced to death.

In February 2022, PAS president Abdul Hadi Awang described media outlets such as Malaysiakini as anti-Islam and alleged that they had slandered the Taliban by reporting that it was denying girls and women the right to education. The Taliban had banned girls from obtaining a formal education in the 1990s. In March 2022, the Taliban reneged on its promise to open secondary schools for girls, eliciting condemnation.

== Organisational structure ==
=== Central Working Committee (2025–2027) ===
Abdul Hadi Awang, current President

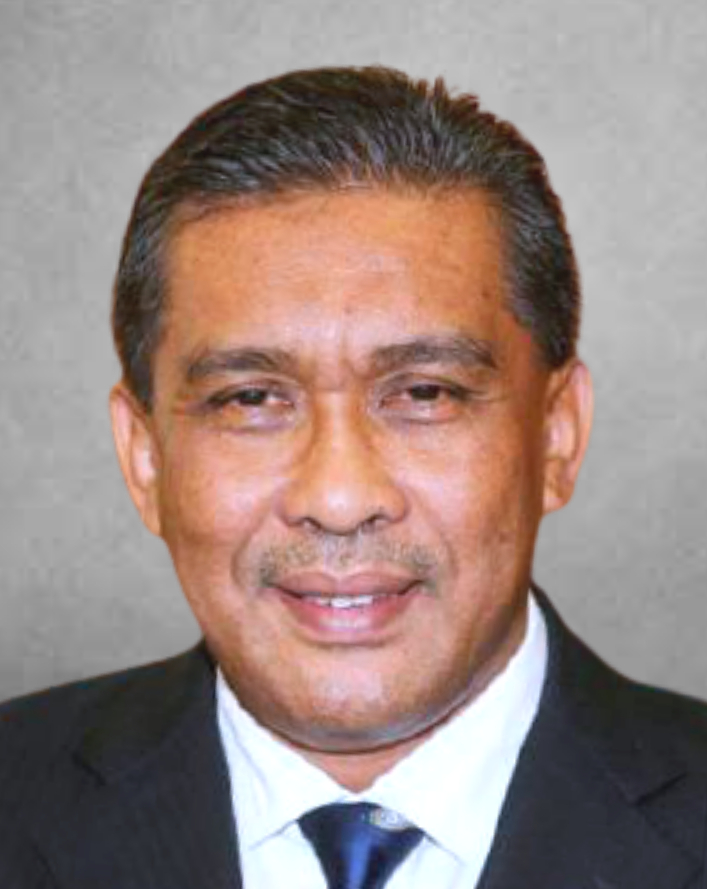
Takiyuddin Hassan, current Secretary-General

PAS's general assembly ("Muktamar") elects the party's president, deputy president, three vice presidents and a multi-member Central Working Committee. The assembly is held annually, but elections occur only once every two years. The assembly is composed mainly of delegates elected by individual local divisions of the party. The day-to-day administration of the party is carried out by its Secretary-General, a position appointed by the party's leadership. The Central Working Committee is ostensibly the party's principal decision-making body, although its decisions are susceptible to being overturned by the Syura Council, an unelected body composed only of Muslim clerics and led by the party's Spiritual Leader ("Musyidul 'Am"). The relationship between the different administrative bodies within the party occasionally causes conflict. In 2014, the Central Working Committee voted to support the nomination of Wan Azizah Wan Ismail, the President of the People's Justice Party, to be the Chief Minister of the Pakatan Rakyat government in Selangor. Abdul Hadi Awang, as PAS's president and with the backing of the Syura Council, overturned the decision and nominated different candidates.

The party has three recognised sub-organisations for different categories of party members: an ulama wing (the "Dewan Ulama") for Muslim clerics, a women's wing (the "Dewan Muslimat") and a youth wing (the "Dewan Pemuda"). Each wing elects its leadership at its general assembly. There is a fourth wing for non-Muslim supporters of the party, although it does not have the same recognised position in the party's structure as the other three wings.

PAS has approximately one million members, more than any other opposition party in Malaysia. PAS members often distinguish themselves from UMNO members through cultural and religious practices. For Islamic headwear, males who support PAS tend to prefer the white, soft kopiah, while UMNO supporters tend to wear the traditional Malay songkok, a rigid black cap. Some areas of Malaysia host rival mosques catering for the members and supporters of each party.

- Spiritual Leader:
  - Ahmad Yakob
- Deputy Spiritual Leader:
  - Mahfudz Mohamed
- Permanent Chairperson:
  - Hussin Ismail
- Deputy Permanent Chairperson:
  - Kamal Ashaari
- President:
  - Abdul Hadi Awang
- Deputy President:
  - Tuan Ibrahim Tuan Man
- Vice-president:
  - Ahmad Samsuri Mokhtar
  - Mohd Amar Abdullah
  - Idris Ahmad
- Dewan Ulamak's Chief:
  - Ahmad Yahaya
- Dewan Pemuda's Chief:
  - Afnan Hamimi Taib Azamudden
- Dewan Muslimat's Chief:
  - Nuridah Mohd Salleh
- DHPP Chief:
  - Balasubramaniam Nachiappan
- Secretary-General:
  - Takiyuddin Hassan
- Assistant Secretary-General:
  - Khairul Faizi Ahmad Kamil
  - Mohd Syahir Che Sulaiman
  - TBA
- Treasurer:
  - Iskandar Abdul Samad
- Information Chief:
  - Ahmad Fadhli Shaari
- Election Director:
  - Muhammad Sanusi Md Nor
- Deputy Election Director:
  - Annuar Musa
- Political Secretary to the President:
  - Mohd Syahir Che Sulaiman
- Central Working Committee Members (Elected):
  - Ahmad Fadhli Shaari
  - Muhammad Sanusi Md Nor
  - Haim Hilman Abdullah
  - Muhammad Khalil Abdul Hadi
  - Khairil Nizam Khirudin
  - Mohd. Nassuruddin Daud
  - Azman Ibrahim
  - Halimah Ali
  - Siti Zailah Mohd Yusoff
  - Ahmad Marzuk Shaary
  - Ahmad Amzad Hashim
  - Mohamed Fadzli Hassan
  - Riduan Mohamad Nor
  - Shahidan Kassim
  - Nik Mohamad Abduh Nik Abdul Aziz
  - Awang Hashim
  - Mumtaz Md Nawi
  - Iskandar Abdul Samad
- Central Working Committee Members (Appointed):
  - Annuar Musa
  - Mohd Shukri Ramli
  - Wan Rohimi Wan Daud
  - Rosni Adam
  - Mohd Misbahul Munir Masduki
  - Najihatussalehah Ahmad
  - Bakri Jamaluddin
  - Mohd Yusni Mat Piah
  - Ahmad Yunus Hairi
  - Mohd Mazri Yahya
  - Razman Zakaria
- State Commissioner:
  - Perlis: Ahmad Ali
  - Kedah: Ahmad Yahaya
  - Kelantan: Ahmad Yakob
  - Terengganu: Husin Awang
  - Penang: Muhammad Fauzi Yusoff
  - Perak: Idris Ahmad
  - Pahang: Rosli Abdul Jabar
  - Selangor: Ab Halim Tamuri
  - Federal Territories: Azhar Yahya
  - Negeri Sembilan: Mohd Fairuz Mohd Isa
  - Malacca: Zulkifli Ismail
  - Johor: Mahfodz Mohamed
  - Sabah: Aliakbar Gulasan
  - Sarawak: Mohammad Arifiriazul Paijo

Dewan Ulamak PAS Pusat (DUPP) (2025–2027)

- Dewan Ulamak's Chief:
  - Ahmad Yahya
- Dewan Ulamak's Deputy Chief:
  - Zulkifli Ismail
- Dewan Ulamak's Vice Chief:
  - Khirul Muntanazar Ismail
- Dewan Ulamak's Secretary:
  - Nushi Mahfodz
- Dewan Ulamak's Assistant Secretary:
  - Nazri Cik
  - Mohd Asri Mat Daud
  - Hishamuddin Abdul Karim
- Dewan Ulamak's Treasurer:
  - Abu Munqiz Din
- Dewan Ulamak's Information Chief:
  - Mohd Nor Hamzah
- Dewan Ulamak's Election Director:
  - Muhammad Ismi Mat Taib
- Dewan Ulamak's Central Working Committee:
  - Ibrahim Zakaria
  - Zulkarnain Hassan
  - Ahmad Adnan Fadhil
  - Ahmad Nafiri Toazi
  - Ibrahim Tahir
  - Azhar Yahya
  - Muhammad Al-Saqbani Abdul Rahim
  - Azki Hafizi Ibrahim
  - Nurul Akma Sheikh Mohd Amin
  - Azhar Yaakub
  - Abdul Azim Abu Hassan
  - Razali Ad Ghafar
  - Ana Mastura Ismail
  - Mohd Fairul Mohd Isa
  - Isa Abd Jalil

Majlis Syura Ulamak PAS Pusat (2026–2030)

- Spiritual Leader:
  - Ahmad Yakob
- Deputy Spiritual Leader:
  - Mahfodz Mohamed
- Secretary:
  - Mohd Asri Mat Daud
- Members:
  - Abdul Hadi Awang
  - Tuan Ibrahim Tuan Man
  - Idris Ahmad
  - Ahmad Yahaya
  - Nik Muhammad Zawawi Salleh
  - Zulkifli Ismail
  - Azhar Yahya
  - Aminurraasyid Yatiban
  - Muhammad Khalil Abdul Hadi
  - Ahmad Ali
  - Mohd Yakub @ Zulkifli Mohd Yusoff
  - Shukeri Mohamad

Dewan Pemuda PAS Malaysia (DPPM) (2025–2027)

- Youth Chief:
  - Afnan Hamimi Taib Azamudden
- Youth Deputy Chief:
  - Mohd Hafez Sabri
- Youth Vice Chief:
  - Muhammad Hanif Jamaluddin
- Youth Secretary:
  - Muhd Khidhir Izaidin
- Youth Treasurer:
  - Mhud Hafiz Mazlan
- Youth Information Chief:
  - Khairul Nadzir Helmi Azhar
- Youth Election Director:
  - Tengku Muhammad Fakhruddin Tengku Muhammad Fauzi
- Youth Central Working Committee:
  - Abdul Malik Ab Razak
  - Wan Abu Bakar Wan Mahussin
  - Yusof Abdul Hadi
  - Muhammad Nazrul Hakim Md Nazir
  - Mohd Harun Esa
  - Muhammad Faizuddin Mohd Zai
  - Mohd Aizat Zakaria
  - Muhammad Abdul Malik Abdul Karim
  - Hendri Hamsah

Dewan Muslimat PAS Pusat (DMPP) (2025–2027)

- Muslimat Chief:
  - Nuridah Mohd. Salleh
- Muslimat Deputy Chief:
  - Rosni Adam
- Muslimat Vice Chief:
  - Salamiah Mohd Noor
- Muslimat Secretary:
  - Nurul Hani Ali
- Muslimat Assistant Secretary:
  - Mardhiah Hayati Zolkeplai
  - Huda Nordin
  - Norhafiza Fadzil
- Muslimat Treasurer:
  - Mardhiyah Hayati Salleh
- Muslimat Information Chief:
  - Najihatussalehah Ahmad
- Muslimat Election Director:
  - 'Uyun Abdul Malek
- Muslimat Central Working Committee:
  - Mumtaz Md Nawi
  - Asmak Husin
  - Siti Ashah Ghazali
  - Zuraida Md Noor
  - Siti Mastura Muhammad
  - Wahibah Twahir
  - Wan Hasrina Wan Hassan
  - Noraini Hussin
  - Nur Jaslina Shafawi
  - Reen Mohd Amin
  - Muna Adila Che Rime
  - Salmah Abdul Rahman
  - Siti Rohaya Ahad
  - Norazlin Md Samsudin
  - Mardhiyyah Johari
  - Safinatunnajah Ibrahim
  - Farhana Bakar
  - Dayangku Huda Ahmad
  - Nurul Ashidah Johari
  - Siti Aminah Muhammad Imran
  - Rahsidah Arbain
  - Kamilia Ibrahim

== Leadership ==
=== Spiritual leader ===
Name	Term of position	Years in position
Yusof Rawa	1987–1994	7 years
Nik Abdul Aziz Nik Mat	1994–2015	21 years
Haron Din	2015–2016	1 year
Hashim Jasin	2016–2026	10 years
Ahmad Yakob	2026–present	0 years

=== President ===
Name	Term of position	Years in position
Ahmad Fuad Hassan	1951–1953	2 years
Abbas Alias	1953–1956	3 years
Burhanuddin al-Helmy	1956–1969	13 years
Asri Muda	1969–1982	13 years
Yusof Rawa	1982–1989	7 years
Fadzil Noor	1989–2002	13 years
Abdul Hadi Awang	2002–present	24 years

=== Secretary-general ===
Name	Term of position	Years in position
Ahmad Maliki	1951–1953	3 years
Ahmad Awang	1953–1954	2 years
Mohd Asri Muda (acting)	1954	1 year
Abdul Rahman Mahadi (acting)	1954–1955	2 years
Mohamad Hashim (acting)	1955–1956	2 years
Zabidi Ali	1956	1 year
Othman Abdullah	1956–1959	4 years
Hashim Abdullah al-Baghdadi	1959–1961	3 years
Abdullah Zawawi Hamzah	1961–1969	9 years
Baharuddin Abdul Latif	1969–1971	3 years
Abu Bakar Hamzah	1971–1975	5 years
Hassan Shukri	1975–1979	5 years
Nakhaie Ahmad	1979–1981	3 years
Abu Bakar Umar	1981–1982	2 years
Hassan Shukri	1982–1989	8 years
Halim Arshat	1989–1998	10 years
Hishamuddin Yahaya (acting)	1998–1999	2 years
Nasharudin Mat Isa	1999–2005	7 years
Kamarudin Jaffar	2005–2009	5 years
Mustafa Ali	2009–2015	7 years
Takiyuddin Hassan	2015–present	11 years

== Elected representatives ==
=== Dewan Negara (Senate) ===
==== Senators ====
- Kelantan:
  - Wan Martina Wan Yusoff
  - Nik Mohamad Abduh Nik Abdul Aziz
- Terengganu:
  - Che Alias Hamid
  - Hussin Ismail
- Perlis
  - Baharuddin Ahmad
- Kedah:
  - Abd Nasir Idris
  - Musoddak Ahmad

=== Dewan Rakyat (House of Representatives) ===
==== Members of Parliament of the 15th Malaysian Parliament ====
PAS has the highest number of representatives in the Dewan Rakyat among all political parties with 43 representatives.

State	No.	Parliament Constituency	Member	Party
Perlis	P001	Padang Besar	Rushdan Rusmi	PAS
Perlis	P003	Arau	Shahidan Kassim	PAS
Kedah	P005	Jerlun	Abdul Ghani Ahmad	PAS
Kedah	P007	Padang Terap	Nurul Amin Hamid	PAS
Kedah	P008	Pokok Sena	Ahmad Yahaya	PAS
Kedah	P009	Alor Setar	Afnan Hamimi Taib Azamudden	PAS
Kedah	P010	Kuala Kedah	Ahmad Fakhruddin Fakhrurazi	PAS
Kedah	P011	Pendang	Awang Hashim	PAS
Kedah	P012	Jerai	Sabri Azit	PAS
Kedah	P013	Sik	Ahmad Tarmizi Sulaiman	PAS
Kedah	P016	Baling	Hassan Saad	PAS
Kelantan	P019	Tumpat	Mumtaz Md. Nawi	PAS
Kelantan	P020	Pengkalan Chepa	Ahmad Marzuk Shaary	PAS
Kelantan	P021	Kota Bharu	Takiyuddin Hassan	PAS
Kelantan	P022	Pasir Mas	Ahmad Fadhli Shaari	PAS
Kelantan	P023	Rantau Panjang	Siti Zailah Mohd Yusoff	PAS
Kelantan	P024	Kubang Kerian	Tuan Ibrahim Tuan Man	PAS
Kelantan	P025	Bachok	Mohd Syahir Che Sulaiman	PAS
Kelantan	P028	Pasir Puteh	Nik Muhammad Zawawi Salleh	PAS
Kelantan	P031	Kuala Krai	Abdul Latiff Abdul Rahman	PAS
Terengganu	P033	Besut	Che Mohamad Zulkifly Jusoh	PAS
Terengganu	P034	Setiu	Shaharizukirnain Abdul Kadir	PAS
Terengganu	P035	Kuala Nerus	Alias Razak	PAS
Terengganu	P036	Kuala Terengganu	Ahmad Amzad Hashim	PAS
Terengganu	P037	Marang	Abdul Hadi Awang	PAS
Terengganu	P039	Dungun	Wan Hassan Mohd Ramli	PAS
Terengganu	P040	Kemaman	Ahmad Samsuri Mokhtar	PAS
Penang	P041	Kepala Batas	Siti Mastura Muhammad	PAS
Penang	P044	Permatang Pauh	Muhammad Fawwaz Mohamad Jan	PAS
Perak	P057	Parit Buntar	Mohd Misbahul Munir Masduki	PAS
Perak	P058	Bagan Serai	Idris Ahmad	PAS
Perak	P069	Parit	Muhammad Ismi Mat Taib	PAS
Perak	P073	Pasir Salak	Jamaludin Yahya	PAS
Pahang	P081	Jerantut	Khairil Nizam Khirudin	PAS
Pahang	P083	Kuantan	Wan Razali Wan Nor	PAS
Pahang	P086	Maran	Ismail Abdul Muttalib	PAS
Pahang	P087	Kuala Krau	Kamal Ashaari	PAS
Pahang	P088	Temerloh	Salamiah Mohd Nor	PAS
Selangor	P094	Hulu Selangor	Mohd Hasnizan Harun	PAS
Selangor	P109	Kapar	Halimah Ali	PAS
Selangor	P112	Kuala Langat	Ahmad Yunus Hairi	PAS
Malacca	P136	Tangga Batu	Bakri Jamaluddin	PAS
Malacca	P139	Jasin	Zulkifli Ismail	PAS
Total	Perlis (2), Kedah (9), Kelantan (9), Terengganu (7), Penang (2), Perak (4), Pahang (5), Selangor (3), Malacca (2)			

=== Dewan Undangan Negeri (State Legislative Assembly) ===
==== Malaysian State Assembly Representatives ====
PAS has 146 members of state legislative assemblies, more than any other parties. It has representatives in every assembly outside of Johor and Sarawak. The party holds a majority in the Kelantan, Terengganu, Kedah and Perlis State Legislative Assemblies.

Terengganu State Legislative Assembly
27 / 33
Kelantan State Legislative Assembly
37 / 45
Kedah State Legislative Assembly
21 / 36
Perlis State Legislative Assembly
5 / 15
Pahang State Legislative Assembly
15 / 47
Perak State Legislative Assembly
17 / 59
Selangor State Legislative Assembly
10 / 56
Penang State Legislative Assembly
7 / 40
Negeri Sembilan State Legislative Assembly
4 / 36
Malacca State Legislative Assembly
2 / 28
Sabah State Legislative Assembly
1 / 79
Johor State Legislative Assembly
0 / 56
Sarawak State Legislative Assembly
0 / 82

State	No.	Parliamentary Constituency	No.	State Assembly Constituency	Member	Party
Perlis	P001	Padang Besar	N02	Beseri	Haziq Asyraf Dun	PAS
Perlis	P001	Padang Besar	N05	Santan	Mohammad Azmir Azizan	PAS
Perlis	P002	Kangar	N10	Kayang	Asrul Aimran Abd Jalil	PAS
Perlis	P003	Arau	N14	Simpang Empat	Razali Saad	PAS
Perlis	P003	Arau	N15	Sanglang	Mohd Shukri Ramli	PAS
Kedah	P005	Jerlun	N04	Ayer Hitam	Azhar Ibrahim	PAS
Kedah	P006	Kubang Pasu	N06	Jitra	Haim Hilman Abdullah	PAS
Kedah	P007	Padang Terap	N07	Kuala Nerang	Mohamad Yusoff Zakaria	PAS
Kedah	P007	Padang Terap	N08	Pedu	Mohd Radzi Md Amin	PAS
Kedah	P008	Pokok Sena	N09	Bukit Lada	Salim Mahmood	PAS
Kedah	P008	Pokok Sena	N10	Bukit Pinang	Wan Romani Wan Salim	PAS
Kedah	P009	Alor Setar	N14	Alor Mengkudu	Muhamad Radhi Mat Din	PAS
Kedah	P010	Kuala Kedah	N15	Anak Bukit	Rashidi Razak	PAS
Kedah	P010	Kuala Kedah	N17	Pengkalan Kundor	Mardhiyyah Johari	PAS
Kedah	P011	Pendang	N18	Tokai	Mohd Hayati Othman	PAS
Kedah	P012	Jerai	N20	Sungai Limau	Mohd Azam Abd Samat	PAS
Kedah	P012	Jerai	N22	Gurun	Baddrol Bakhtiar	PAS
Kedah	P013	Sik	N23	Belantek	Ahmad Sulaiman	PAS
Kedah	P013	Sik	N24	Jeneri	Muhammad Sanusi Md Nor	PAS
Kedah	P014	Merbok	N25	Bukit Selambau	Azizan Hamzah	PAS
Kedah	P014	Merbok	N26	Tanjong Dawai	Hanif Ghazali	PAS
Kedah	P015	Sungai Petani	N27	Pantai Merdeka	Sharir Long	PAS
Kedah	P016	Baling	N31	Kupang	Najmi Ahmad	PAS
Kedah	P016	Baling	N32	Kuala Ketil	Mansor Zakaria	PAS
Kedah	P017	Padang Serai	N33	Merbau Pulas	Siti Aishah Ghazali	PAS
Kedah	P018	Kulim-Bandar Baharu	N36	Bandar Baharu	Mohd Suffian Yusoff	PAS
Kelantan	P019	Tumpat	N1	Pengkalan Kubor	Wan Roslan Wan Mamat	PAS
Kelantan	P019	Tumpat	N02	Kelaboran	Mohd Adenan Hassan	PAS
Kelantan	P019	Tumpat	N03	Pasir Pekan	Ahmad Yakob	PAS
Kelantan	P019	Tumpat	N04	Wakaf Bharu	Mohd Rusli Abdullah	PAS
Kelantan	P020	Pengkalan Chepa	N05	Kijang	Izani Husin	PAS
Kelantan	P020	Pengkalan Chepa	N06	Chempaka	Nik Asma' Bahrum Nik Abdullah	PAS
Kelantan	P020	Pengkalan Chepa	N07	Panchor	Nik Mohd Amar Nik Abdullah	PAS
Kelantan	P021	Kota Bharu	N08	Tanjong Mas	Rohani Ibrahim	PAS
Kelantan	P021	Kota Bharu	N10	Bunut Payong	Ramli Mamat	PAS
Kelantan	P022	Pasir Mas	N11	Tendong	Rozi Muhamad	PAS
Kelantan	P022	Pasir Mas	N12	Pengkalan Pasir	Mohd Nasriff Daud	PAS
Kelantan	P022	Pasir Mas	N13	Meranti	Mohd Nassruddin Daud	PAS
Kelantan	P023	Rantau Panjang	N14	Chetok	Zuraidin Abdullah	PAS
Kelantan	P023	Rantau Panjang	N15	Gual Periok	Kamaruzaman Mohamad	PAS
Kelantan	P023	Rantau Panjang	N16	Apam Putra	Abdul Rasul Mohamed	PAS
Kelantan	P024	Kubang Kerian	N17	Salor	Saizol Ismail	PAS
Kelantan	P024	Kubang Kerian	N18	Pasir Tumboh	Abd Rahman Yunus	PAS
Kelantan	P024	Kubang Kerian	N19	Demit	Mohd Asri Mat Daud	PAS
Kelantan	P025	Bachok	N20	Tawang	Harun Ismail	PAS
Kelantan	P025	Bachok	N21	Pantai Irama	Mohd Huzaimy Che Husin	PAS
Kelantan	P025	Bachok	N22	Jelawat	Zameri Mat Nawang	PAS
Kelantan	P026	Ketereh	N23	Melor	Wan Rohimi Wan Daud	PAS
Kelantan	P026	Ketereh	N24	Kadok	Azami Mohd Nor	PAS
Kelantan	P027	Tanah Merah	N26	Bukit Panau	Abd Fattah Mahmood	PAS
Kelantan	P027	Tanah Merah	N28	Kemahang	Md Anizam Ab Rahman	PAS
Kelantan	P028	Pasir Puteh	N29	Selising	Tuan Mohd Sharipudin Tuan Ismail	PAS
Kelantan	P028	Pasir Puteh	N30	Limbongan	Nor Asilah Mohamed Zin	PAS
Kelantan	P028	Pasir Puteh	N31	Semerak	Nor Sham Sulaiman	PAS
Kelantan	P028	Pasir Puteh	N32	Gaal	Mohd Rodzi Ja'afar	PAS
Kelantan	P029	Machang	N33	Pulai Chondong	Azhar Salleh	PAS
Kelantan	P029	Machang	N34	Temangan	Mohamed Fazli Hassan	PAS
Kelantan	P029	Machang	N35	Kemuning	Ahmad Zakhran Mat Noor	PAS
Kelantan	P030	Jeli	N38	Kuala Balah	Abdul Hadi Awang Kechil	PAS
Kelantan	P031	Kuala Krai	N39	Mengkebang	Zubir Abu Bakar	PAS
Kelantan	P031	Kuala Krai	N40	Guchil	Hilmi Abdullah	PAS
Kelantan	P031	Kuala Krai	N41	Manek Urai	Mohd Fauzi Abdullah	PAS
Kelantan	P031	Kuala Krai	N42	Dabong	Ku Mohd Zaki Ku Hussien	PAS
Terengganu	P033	Besut	N01	Kuala Besut	Azbi Salleh	PAS
Terengganu	P033	Besut	N02	Kota Putera	Mohd Nurkhuzaini Ab Rahman	PAS
Terengganu	P033	Besut	N03	Jertih	Riduan Md Nor	PAS
Terengganu	P34	Setiu	N5	Jabi	Azman Ibrahim	PAS
Terengganu	P34	Setiu	N07	Langkap	Azmi Maarof	PAS
Terengganu	P34	Setiu	N8	Batu Rakit	Mohd Shafizi Ismail	PAS
Terengganu	P035	Kuala Nerus	N9	Tepuh	Hishamuddin Abdul Karim	PAS
Terengganu	P035	Kuala Nerus	N10	Buloh Gading	Ridzuan Hashim	PAS
Terengganu	P035	Kuala Nerus	N12	Bukit Tunggal	Zaharudin Zahid	PAS
Terengganu	P036	Kuala Terengganu	N13	Wakaf Mempelam	Wan Sukairi Wan Abdullah	PAS
Terengganu	P036	Kuala Terengganu	N14	Bandar	Ahmad Shah Muhamed	PAS
Terengganu	P036	Kuala Terengganu	N15	Ladang	Zuraida Md Noor	PAS
Terengganu	P036	Kuala Terengganu	N16	Batu Buruk	Muhammad Khalil Abdul Hadi	PAS
Terengganu	P037	Marang	N17	Alur Limbat	Ariffin Deraman	PAS
Terengganu	P037	Marang	N18	Bukit Payung	Mohd Nor Hamzah	PAS
Terengganu	P037	Marang	N19	Ru Rendang	Ahmad Samsuri Mokhtar	PAS
Terengganu	P037	Marang	N20	Pengkalan Berangan	Sulaiman Sulong	PAS
Terengganu	P038	Hulu Terengganu	N22	Manir	Hilmi Harun	PAS
Terengganu	P038	Hulu Terengganu	N23	Kuala Berang	Mamad Puteh	PAS
Terengganu	P038	Hulu Terengganu	N24	Ajil	Maliaman Kassim	PAS
Terengganu	P039	Dungun	N25	Bukit Besi	Ghazali Sulaiman	PAS
Terengganu	P039	Dungun	N26	Rantau Abang	Mohd Fadhli Rahmi Zulkifli	PAS
Terengganu	P039	Dungun	N27	Sura	Tengku Muhammad Fakhruddin	PAS
Terengganu	P039	Dungun	N28	Paka	Satiful Bahri Mamat	PAS
Terengganu	P040	Kemaman	N29	Kemasik	Saiful Azmi Suhaili	PAS
Terengganu	P040	Kemaman	N31	Cukai	Hanafiah Mat	PAS
Terengganu	P040	Kemaman	N32	Air Putih	Mohd Hafiz Adam	PAS
Penang	P041	Kepala Batas	N1	Penaga	Mohd Yusni Mat Piah	PAS
Penang	P041	Kepala Batas	N03	Pinang Tunggal	Bukhori Ghazali	PAS
Penang	P042	Tasek Gelugor	N4	Permatang Berangan	Mohd Sobri Salleh	PAS
Penang	P042	Tasek Gelugor	N05	Sungai Dua	Muhammad Fauzi Yusoff	PAS
Penang	P044	Permatang Pauh	N11	Permatang Pasir	Amir Hamzah Abdul Hashim	PAS
Penang	P047	Nibong Tebal	N20	Sungai Bakap	Abidin Ismail	PAS
Penang	P053	Balik Pulau	N39	Pulau Betong	Mohamad Shukor Zakariah	PAS
Perak	P054	Gerik	N01	Pengkalan Hulu	Mohamad Amir Roslan	PAS
Perak	P055	Lenggong	N03	Kenering	Husaini Ariffin	PAS
Perak	P56	Larut	N5	Selama	Mohd Akmal Kamaruddin	PAS
Perak	P56	Larut	N06	Kubu Gajah	Khalil Yahaya	PAS
Perak	P057	Parit Buntar	N08	Titi Serong	Hakimi Hamzi Hayat	PAS
Perak	P058	Bagan Serai	N11	Gunong Semaggol	Razman Zakaria	PAS
Perak	P058	Bagan Serai	N12	Selinsing	Sallehuddin Abdullah	PAS
Perak	P059	Bukit Gantang	N14	Changkat Jering	Rahim Ismail	PAS
Perak	P059	Bukit Gantang	N15	Trong	Faisal Abdul Rahman	PAS
Perak	P060	Taiping	N16	Kamunting	Mohd Fakhruddin Abdul Aziz	PAS
Perak	P061	Padang Rengas	N20	Lubok Merbau	Azizi Mohamed Ridzuan	PAS
Perak	P063	Tambun	N23	Manjoi	Mohd Hafez Sabri	PAS
Perak	P067	Kuala Kangsar	N35	Manong	Burhanuddin Ahmad	PAS
Perak	P069	Parit	N40	Bota	Najihatussalehah Ahmad	PAS
Perak	P073	Pasir Salak	N50	Kampong Gajah	Zafarulazaln Zan	PAS
Perak	P074	Lumut	N51	Pasir Panjang	Rosli Abd Rahman	PAS
Perak	P077	Tanjong Malim	N58	Slim	Muhammad Zulfadli Zainal	PAS
Pahang	P079	Lipis	N04	Cheka	Tuan Ibrahim Tuan Man	PAS
Pahang	P81	Jerantut	N9	Tahan	Mohd Zakhwan Ahmad Badarddin	PAS
Pahang	P81	Jerantut	N10	Damak	Zuridan Mohd Daud	PAS
Pahang	P81	Jerantut	N11	Pulau Tawar	Yohanis Ahmad	PAS
Pahang	P082	Indera Mahkota	N12	Beserah	Andansura Rabu	PAS
Pahang	P083	Kuantan	N15	Tanjung Lumpur	Rosli Abdul Jabar	PAS
Pahang	P084	Paya Besar	N17	Sungai Lembing	Mohamad Ayub Asri	PAS
Pahang	P084	Paya Besar	N19	Panching	Mohd Tarmizi Yahaya	PAS
Pahang	P085	Pekan	N20	Pulau Manis	Mohd Rafiq Khan Ahmad Khan	PAS
Pahang	P086	Maran	N24	Luit	Mohd Soffian Abd Jalil	PAS
Pahang	P086	Maran	N26	Chenor	Mujibur Rahman Ishak	PAS
Pahang	P087	Jengka	N29	Jengka	Shahril Azman Abd Halim	PAS
Pahang	P088	Temerloh	N31	Lanchang	Hassan Omar	PAS
Pahang	P088	Temerloh	N32	Kuala Semantan	Hassanudin Salim	PAS
Pahang	P091	Rompin	N40	Bukit Ibam	Nazri Ahmad	PAS
Selangor	P092	Sabak Bernam	N02	Sabak	Sallehen Mukhyi	PAS
Selangor	P093	Sungai Besar	N03	Sungai Panjang	Mohd Razali Saari	PAS
Selangor	P094	Hulu Selangor	N05	Hulu Bernam	Mui'zzuddeen Mahyuddin	PAS
Selangor	P095	Tanjong Karang	N08	Sungai Burong	Mohd Zamri Mohd Zainuldin	PAS
Selangor	P096	Kuala Selangor	N11	Ijok	Jefri Mejan	PAS
Selangor	P101	Hulu Langat	N24	Semenyih	Nushi Mahfodz	PAS
Selangor	P102	Bangi	N26	Sungai Ramal	Mohd Shafie Ngah	PAS
Selangor	P107	Sungai Buloh	N38	Paya Jaras	Ab Halim Tamuri	PAS
Selangor	P109	Kapar	N43	Sementa	Noor Najhan Mohamad Salleh	PAS
Selangor	P112	Kuala Langat	N51	Sijangkang	Ahmad Yunus Hairi	PAS
Negeri Sembilan	P127	Jempol	N05	Serting	Mohd Fairuz Mohd Isa	PAS
Negeri Sembilan	P128	Seremban	N14	Ampangan	Mohamad Rafie Abdul Malek	PAS
Negeri Sembilan	P131	Rembau	N25	Paroi	Kamarol Ridzuan Mohd Zain	PAS
Negeri Sembilan	P132	Port Dickson	N31	Bagan Pinang	Abdul Fatah Zakaria	PAS
Malacca	P136	Tangga Batu	N13	Paya Rumput	Rafie Ahmad	PAS
Malacca	P137	Hang Tuah Jaya	N17	Bukit Katil	Ridzuan Sarif	PAS
Sabah	P171	Sepanggar	N16	Karambunai	Aliakbar Gulasan	PAS
Total	Perlis (5), Kedah (21), Kelantan (37), Terengganu (27), Penang (7), Perak (17), Pahang (15), Selangor (10), Negeri Sembilan (4), Malacca (2), Sabah (1)					

== Government offices ==
=== State governments ===
PAS currently governs the states of Perlis, Kedah, Kelantan, and Terengganu. In the past, the party was part of the Penang and Selangor state governments when it was a component of Pakatan Rakyat. During the 2020–2022 Malaysian political crisis and again in 2026, PAS aligned itself with Barisan Nasional under the Muafakat Nasional umbrella to form the state governments in Perak, Pahang, Johor and in Negeri Sembilan.

- Kelantan (1959–1977, 1990–present)
- Terengganu (1959–1961, 1972–1977, 1999–2004, 2018–present)
- Kedah (1972–1977, 2008–2013, 2020–present)
- Perlis (1972–1977, 2022–2025, 2025–present)
- Malacca (1974–1977, 2026–present)
- Negeri Sembilan (2026–present)
- Perak (1972–1977, 2008–2009, 2020–2022)
- Pahang (1974–1977, 2019–2022)
- Johor (2020–2022)
- Selangor (1974–1977, 2008–2018)
- Penang (1974–1977, 2008–2015)

Note: bold as Menteri Besar/Chief Minister, italic as junior partner

State	Leader type	Member	State Constituency
Kedah	Menteri Besar	Muhammad Sanusi Md Nor	Jeneri
Kelantan	Menteri Besar	Mohd Nassuruddin Daud	Meranti
Terengganu	Menteri Besar	Ahmad Samsuri Mokhtar	Rhu Rendang

State	Leader type	Member	State Constituency
Kelantan	Deputy Menteri Besar	Mohamed Fadzli Hassan	Temangan

=== Legislative leadership ===
State	Leader type	Member	State Constituency
Kedah	Speaker	Zubir Ahmad	Non-MLA
Kelantan	Speaker	Mohd Amar Abdullah	Panchor
Perlis	Speaker	Rus'sele Eizan	Non-MLA
Terengganu	Speaker	Mohd. Nor Hamzah	Bukit Payung
Negeri Sembilan	Deputy Speaker	Kamarol Ridzuan Mohd Zain	Paroi

=== Official opposition ===
State	Leader type	Member	State Constituency
Pahang	Opposition Leader	Tuan Ibrahim Tuan Man	Cheka
Penang	Opposition Leader	Muhammad Fauzi Yusoff	Sungai Dua
Perak	Opposition Leader	Razman Zakaria	Gunong Semanggol

== Election results ==
=== General election results ===
Election	Total seats won	Seats contested	Total votes	Share of votes	Outcome of election	Election leader
1955	1 / 52	52	40,667	3.9%	▲1 seats; Opposition	Abbas Alias
1959	13 / 104	52	329,070	21.3%	▲12 seats; Opposition	Burhanuddin al-Helmy
1964	9 / 159	59	301,187	14.6%	▼4 seats; Opposition	Burhanuddin al-Helmy
1969	12 / 144	39	495,641	20.9%	▲3 seats; Opposition, later Governing coalition (Alliance)	Burhanuddin al-Helmy
1974	13 / 154	29	148,386	7.0%	▲1 seats; Governing coalition (Barisan Nasional)	Asri Muda
1978	5 / 154	60	537,720	15.5%	▼8 seats; Opposition	Asri Muda
1982	5 / 154	60	602,530	14.5%	; Opposition	Asri Muda
1986	1 / 177	70	718,891	15.6%	▼4 seats; Opposition coalition (Harakah Keadilan Rakyat)	Yusof Rawa
1990	7 / 180	79	391,813	7.0%	▲6 seats; Opposition coalition (Angkatan Perpaduan Ummah)	Fadzil Noor
1995	7 / 192	79	430,098	3.3%	; Opposition coalition (Angkatan Perpaduan Ummah)	Fadzil Noor
1999	27 / 193	59	994,279	14.99%	▲20 seats; Opposition coalition (Barisan Alternatif)	Fadzil Noor
2004	7 / 219	65	1,051,480	15.2%	▼20 seats; Opposition coalition (Barisan Alternatif)	Abdul Hadi Awang
2008	23 / 222	70	1,140,676	14.05%	▲16 seats; Opposition coalition (Pakatan Rakyat)	Abdul Hadi Awang
2013	21 / 222	70	1,633,199	14.77%	▼2 seats; Opposition coalition (Pakatan Rakyat)	Abdul Hadi Awang
2018	18 / 222	155	2,032,080	17.89%	▼3 seats; Opposition coalition (Gagasan Sejahtera), later Governing coalition (Perikatan Nasional)	Abdul Hadi Awang
2022	43 / 222	61	2,259,353	14.56%	▲25 seats; Opposition coalition (Perikatan Nasional)	Abdul Hadi Awang

=== State election results ===
State assembly	Election	Votes	%	Seats	Won/contested	+/–	Position (Note: As part of electoral coalition.)	Status
Perlis	2022	49,803	33.6	9 / 15	9 / 9	▲7	▲1st (Perikatan Nasional)	PN (Note: PN–BERSATU (since 2026))
Kedah	2023	508,643	43.8	21 / 36	21 / 21	▲6	▲1st (Perikatan Nasional)	PN
Kelantan	2023	532,041	62.5	37 / 45	37 / 39	Steady	1st (Perikatan Nasional)	PN
Terengganu	2023	414,726	60.0	27 / 32	27 / 27	▲5	1st (Perikatan Nasional)	PN
Penang	2023	109,508	12.3	7 / 40	7 / 10	▲6	▲2nd (Perikatan Nasional)	Opposition
Perak	2022	221,784	15.0	16 / 59	16 / 23	▲13	▲1st (Perikatan Nasional)	Opposition
Pahang	2022	244,114	28.1	15 / 42	15 / 24	▲7	▲1st (Perikatan Nasional)	Opposition
Selangor	2023	368,991	13.8	10 / 56	10 / 17	▲9	▲2nd (Perikatan Nasional)	Opposition
Negeri Sembilan	2026	75,160	11.8	4 / 36	4 / 5	▲1	3rd (Perikatan Nasional)	BN–PN
Malacca	2026	35,028	7.2	2 / 28	2 / 2	▲2	3rd (Perikatan Nasional)	BN–PN
Johor	2026	45,934	2.4	0 / 56	0 / 11	▼1	3rd (Perikatan Nasional)	No seats
Sabah	2025	14,316	1.3	1 / 73	1 / 6	▲1	▲8th (Perikatan Nasional)	GRS–PH–BN
Sarawak	2026	Not contested						No seats

Note

State election	State Legislative Assembly													
State election	Perlis	Kedah	Kelantan	Terengganu	Penang	Perak	Pahang	Selangor	Negeri Sembilan	Malacca	Johor	Sabah	Sarawak	Total won / Total contested
1959	0 / 12	0 / 24	28 / 30	13 / 24	0 / 24	1 / 40	0 / 24	0 / 28	0 / 24	0 / 20	0 / 32			42 / 200
1964	1 / 12	0 / 24	21 / 30	3 / 24	0 / 24	0 / 40	0 / 24	0 / 28	0 / 24	0 / 20	0 / 32			25 / 158
1969	1 / 12	8 / 24	19 / 30	11 / 24	0 / 24	1 / 40	0 / 24	0 / 28	0 / 24	0 / 20	0 / 32		0 / 48	40 / 185
1974	2 / 12	5 / 26	22 / 36	10 / 28	1 / 27	3 / 42	1 / 32	1 / 33	0 / 24	1 / 20	0 / 32		0 / 48	
1978	0 / 12	7 / 26	2 / 36	0 / 28	1 / 27	1 / 42	0 / 32	0 / 33	0 / 24	0 / 20	0 / 32			11 / 204
1982	1 / 12	2 / 26	10 / 36	5 / 28	0 / 27	0 / 42	0 / 32	0 / 33	0 / 24	0 / 20	0 / 32			18 / 223
1986	0 / 14	3 / 28	10 / 39	2 / 32	0 / 33	0 / 46	0 / 33	0 / 42	0 / 28	0 / 20	0 / 36	0 / 48		15 / 265
1987														
1990	0 / 14	1 / 28	24 / 39	8 / 32	0 / 33	0 / 46	0 / 33	0 / 42	0 / 28	0 / 20	0 / 36	0 / 48		33 / 114
1994												0 / 48		0 / 3
1995	0 / 15	2 / 36	24 / 43	7 / 32	0 / 33	0 / 52	0 / 38	0 / 48	0 / 32	0 / 25	0 / 40			33 / 177
1999	3 / 15	12 / 36	41 / 43	28 / 32	1 / 33	3 / 52	6 / 38	4 / 48	0 / 32	0 / 25	0 / 40	0 / 48		98 / 234
2001													0 / 62	0 / 3
2004	1 / 15	5 / 36	24 / 45	4 / 32	1 / 40	0 / 59	0 / 42	0 / 56	0 / 36	0 / 28	1 / 56	0 / 60		36 / 265
2006													0 / 71	0 / 1
2008	1 / 15	16 / 36	38 / 45	8 / 32	1 / 40	6 / 59	2 / 42	8 / 56	1 / 36	0 / 28	2 / 56	0 / 60		83 / 232
2011													0 / 71	0 / 5
2013	1 / 15	9 / 36	32 / 45	14 / 32	1 / 40	5 / 59	3 / 42	15 / 56	0 / 36	1 / 28	4 / 56	0 / 60		85 / 236
2016													0 / 82	0 / 11
2018	2 / 15	15 / 36	37 / 45	22 / 32	1 / 40	3 / 59	8 / 42	1 / 56	0 / 36	0 / 28	1 / 56	0 / 60		90 / 236
2021										0 / 28				0 / 8
2021													0 / 82	0 / 1
2022											1 / 56			1 / 15
2022	9 / 15					17 / 59	15 / 42							41 / 56
2023		21 / 36	37 / 45	27 / 32	7 / 40			10 / 56	3 / 36					105 / 127
2025												1 / 73		1 / 6
2026									4 / 36	2 / 28	0 / 56			6 / 18

== See also ==
- List of Islamic political parties
