= Nik Mohamad Abduh =

Malaysian politician

Yang Berhormat Senator Tuan Nik Mohamad Abduh Nik Abdul Aziz
- نئ محمد عبده نئ عبدالعزيز

Senator Elected by the Kelantan State Legislative Assembly
- Incumbent
- Assumed office 8 July 2023 Serving with Wan Martina
- Monarchs: Abdullah (2023–2024); Ibrahim (since 2024)
- Prime Minister: Anwar Ibrahim
- Preceded by: Mohd Apandi Mohamad

Chairman of the South Kelantan Development Authority
- In office 1 May 2020 – 18 June 2023
- Minister: Abdul Latiff Ahmad (2020–2021); Mahdzir Khalid (2021–2022); Ahmad Zahid Hamidi (2022–2023)
- Director-General: Iskandar Zurkarnain Ibrahim
- Preceded by: Sazmi Miah
- Succeeded by: Zawawi Othman

Youth Chief of the Malaysian Islamic Party
- In office 6 June 2015 – 17 April 2017
- President: Abdul Hadi Awang
- Deputy: Muhammad Khalil Abdul Hadi
- Preceded by: Suhaizan Kayat
- Succeeded by: Muhammad Khalil Abdul Hadi
- Constituency: Pengkalan Chepa

Member of the Malaysian Parliament for Bachok
- In office 9 May 2018 – 19 November 2022
- Preceded by: Ahmad Marzuk Shaary (PAS)
- Succeeded by: Mohd Syahir Che Sulaiman (PN–PAS)
- Majority: 3,292 (2018)

Member of the Malaysian Parliament for Pasir Mas
- In office 5 May 2013 – 9 May 2018
- Preceded by: Ibrahim Ali (Independent)
- Succeeded by: Ahmad Fadhli Shaari (PAS)
- Majority: 8,047 (2013)

Faction represented in Dewan Negara
- 2026–: Perikatan Nasional

Faction represented in Dewan Rakyat
- 2013–2020: Malaysian Islamic Party
- 2020–2022: Perikatan Nasional

Personal details
- Born: Nik Mohamad Abduh bin Nik Abdul Aziz; 22 March 1970 (age 56) Pengkalan Chepa, Kota Bharu, Kelantan, Malaysia
- Citizenship: Malaysia
- Party: Malaysian Islamic Party (PAS)
- Other political affiliations: Pakatan Rakyat (PR) (2008–2015); Gagasan Sejahtera (GS) (2016–2020); Perikatan Nasional (PN) (since 2020)
- Relations: Nik Omar (Elder brother); Nik Adli (Elder brother); Tuan Ibrahim Tuan Man (First cousin)
- Parent(s): Nik Abdul Aziz Nik Mat (died 2015); Tuan Sabariah Tuan Ishak
- Education: Al-Azhar University; Darul Uloom Deoband
- Occupation: Politician
- Profession: Educator

Nik Mohamad Abduh bin Nik Abdul Aziz (Jawi: نئ محمد عبده نئ عبدالعزيز; born 22 March 1970) is a Malaysian politician who has served as a Senator since July 2023. He was the Chairman of the South Kelantan Development Authority (KESEDAR) from May 2020 to June 2023 and the Member of Parliament (MP) for Bachok from May 2018 to November 2022 and for Pasir Mas from May 2013 to May 2018. He is a member of the Malaysian Islamic Party (PAS), a component party of the Perikatan Nasional (PN) and formerly Gagasan Sejahtera (GS) and Pakatan Rakyat (PR) coalitions. He is the son of Nik Abdul Aziz Nik Mat, the former Menteri Besar of Kelantan and former Spiritual Leader of PAS. He was the Youth Chief of PAS from June 2015 to April 2017.

== Early life ==
Nik Mohamad Abduh was born on 22 March 1970. He started his studies at the Kedai Lalat Primary School, Kota Kambing. He later continued his secondary education in Madrasah Nurul Anuar and Maahad Muhammadi. After graduating high school, he continued his religious studies in Lucknow, India as well as Darul Uloom Deoband, India and also Al Azhar University, Cairo, Egypt.

== Career ==
Upon graduation, he worked as an educator:

1. Maahad Muhammadi (boys' school) in 1995 (for 7 months)

2. Maahad Muhammadi (girls' school) (1997–1998)

3. 1st Assistant Teacher (GPK1) in Maahad Darul Anuar (1998–1999)

4. Mudir in Maahad Darul Anuar (2000–2002)

5. Attending Nun Berhad Academy (2003)

6. Principals in Tahfiz Maahad and Nikmatillah Religious Studies (2004–2007).

In addition, he was also a Member of Council Kota Bharu Municipal Council for 8 years.

== Politics ==
In the political arena, Nik Abduh has held several positions at the Center up to the Branch. He has various positions in PAS. The following show which positions he has held:

Center

1. Syura Council Members (2015–2020)

2. Central PAS Working committee members (2013–2015)

3. Central PAS Working committee members (2017–Present)

Youth

1. Chairman of PAS Youth Council Youth PAS Malaysia (2015–2017)

2. Deputy Chairman of PAS Youth Council Malaysia (2011–2013)

3. PAS Youth Council Exco Malaysia (2007–2011)

4. Kelantan PAS Youth Council deputy chairperson (2007–2009)

5. Kelantan PAS Youth Council Exco (2001–2007)

Area

Head of PAS Youth Council for Pengkalan Chepa (2001–2009)

Branch

Member of the PAS Committee of the Melaka Island Branch.

He contested for the first time in the 13th General Election in 2013 at the Pasir Mas seat and won the seat after defeating Independent candidate Dato' Ibrahim Ali.

Nik Mohamad Abduh won the Bachok parliamentary seat in 2018 Malaysian general election after defeating Barisan Nasional, Awang Adek Hussin and Pakatan Harapan candidate Zulkifli Zakaria by 3,292.

== Issues ==
=== Brother detained under ISA ===
His brother Nik Adli was held under the Malaysian Internal Security Act in 2001 for alleged terrorist activities including planning jihad, possession of weapons, and membership in the Kumpulan Mujahidin Malaysia (KMM), an Islamist extremist group. After 5 years in detention without trial, he was released.

== Election results ==
Parliament of Malaysia
Year	Constituency	Candidate	Votes	Pct	Opponent(s)	Votes	Pct	Ballots cast	Majority	Turnout
2013	P022 Pasir Mas	Nik Mohamad Abduh Nik Abdul Aziz (PAS)	33,431	56.84%	Ibrahim Ali (IND)	25,384	43.16%	60,168	8,047	83.61%
2018	P025 Bachok	Nik Mohamad Abduh Nik Abdul Aziz (PAS)	36,188	48.93%	Awang Adek Hussin (UMNO)	32,896	44.48%	75,945	3,292	82.01%
2018	P025 Bachok	Nik Mohamad Abduh Nik Abdul Aziz (PAS)	36,188	48.93%	Zulkifli Zakaria (BERSATU)	4,880	6.60%	75,945	3,292	82.01%

== Honours ==
- Malaysia
  - Recipient of the 17th Yang di-Pertuan Agong Installation Medal

== See also ==
- Members of the Dewan Negara, 15th Malaysian Parliament
- List of people who have served in both Houses of the Malaysian Parliament
