= Tawang (state constituency) =

Electoral district in Kelantan, Malaysia

Tawang (N20)
Kelantan constituency

State constituency
- Legislature: Kelantan State Legislative Assembly
MLA
Harun Ismail
PN
- Constituency created: 1974
- First contested: 1974
- Last contested: 2023

Demographics
- Population (2020): 55,758
- Electors (2023): 43,441

Tawang is a state constituency in Kelantan, Malaysia, that has been represented in the Kelantan State Legislative Assembly.

The state constituency was first contested in 1974 and is mandated to return a single Assemblyman to the Kelantan State Legislative Assembly under the first-past-the-post voting system.

== Demographics ==
As of 2020, Tawang has a population of 55,758 people.

Ethnic breakdown of Tawang's electorate as of 2023
1. Malay (98.8%)
2. Chinese (0.84%)
3. Other ethnicities (0.37%)
4. Indian (0.03%)

== History ==
=== Polling districts ===
According to the Gazette issued on 30 March 2018, the Tawang constituency has a total of 16 polling districts.

State Constituency	Polling Districts	Code	Location
Tawang (N20）	Senak	025/20/01	SK Pantai Senak
Tawang (N20）	Wakaf Alik	025/20/02	SMU (A) Muhammadiah
Tawang (N20）	Tawang	025/20/03	SK Tawang
Tawang (N20）	Beris Gajah Mati	025/20/04	SK Beris Panchor
Tawang (N20）	Anak Tembesu	025/20/05	SMK Beris Panchor
Tawang (N20）	Kampung Tok Jawa	025/20/06	SK Kota Jembal
Tawang (N20）	Telok Mesira	025/20/07	SK Kota Jembal
Tawang (N20）	Pauh Sembilan	025/20/08	SK Pauh Sembilan
Tawang (N20）	Tok Belian	025/20/09	SK Pengkalan Chengal
Tawang (N20）	Tanjong Jering	025/20/10	SK Tanjong Jenara
Tawang (N20）	Beris	025/20/11	SMK Long Yunus
Tawang (N20）	Tanjong Pauh	025/20/12	SK Pa' Pura
Tawang (N20）	Chap	025/20/13	SK Kampong Chap
Tawang (N20）	Bukit Marak	025/20/14	SK Bukit Marak
Tawang (N20）	Paya Teratai	025/20/15	SK Chantum
Tawang (N20）	Bekelam	025/20/16	SK Bekelam

=== Representation history ===
Members of the Legislative Assembly for Tawang
Assembly	No	Years	Member	Party
Constituency created from Bachok Utara
4th	N13	1974–1978	Mohamed Nor Yusoff	BN (PAS)
5th	N13	1978–1982	Tuan Haji Mohd Ali	BERJASA
6th	N13	1982–1986	Idris Ahmad	PAS
7th	N19	1986–1990	Idris Ahmad	PAS
8th	N19	1990–1995	Idris Ahmad	PAS
9th	N19	1995–1999	Hasan Mohamood	PAS
10th	N19	1999–2004	Hasan Mohamood	PAS
11th	N20	2004–2008	Hasan Mohamood	PAS
12th	N20	2008–2013	Hasan Mohamood	PR (PAS)
13th	N20	2013–2018	Hasan Mohamood	PR (PAS)
14th	N20	2018–2020	Hasan Mohamood	PAS
14th	N20	2020–2023	Hasan Mohamood	PN (PAS)
15th	N20	2023–present	Harun Ismail	PN (PAS)

== Election results ==
Kelantan state election, 2023
Party	Candidate	Votes	%	∆%
PAS	Harun Ismail	21,665	79.22	▲20.20
PH	Che Mat Isa Che Dir	5,683	20.78	▲20.78
Total valid votes		27,348	100.00	
Total rejected ballots		215		
Unreturned ballots		60		
Turnout		27,623	63.59	▼19.57
Registered electors		43,441		
Majority		15,982	58.44	▲40.40
PAS hold		Swing		

Kelantan state election, 2018
Party	Candidate	Votes	%	∆%
PAS	Hasan Mohamood	14,991	59.02	▲2.54
BN	Muhamad Radzuan Abdullah	10,408	40.98	▼2.54
Total valid votes		25,399	100.00	
Total rejected ballots		450		
Unreturned ballots		290		
Turnout		26,139	83.16	▼5.20
Registered electors		31,434		
Majority		4,583	18.04	▲5.08
PAS hold		Swing		

Kelantan state election, 2013
Party	Candidate	Votes	%	∆%
PAS	Hasan Mohamood	13,563	56.48	▼2.21
BN	Mohd Zain Yasim	10,451	43.52	▲2.21
Total valid votes		24,014	100.00	
Total rejected ballots		289		
Unreturned ballots		71		
Turnout		24,374	88.36	▲2.27
Registered electors		27,585		
Majority		3,112	12.96	▼4.42
PAS hold		Swing		

Kelantan state election, 2008
Party	Candidate	Votes	%	∆%
PAS	Hassan Mohamood	11,068	58.69	▲3.13
BN	Ibrahim Mat Din	7,790	41.31	▼3.13
Total valid votes		18,858	100.00	
Total rejected ballots		245		
Unreturned ballots		26		
Turnout		19,129	86.29	▲1.52
Registered electors		22,167		
Majority		3,278	17.38	▲6.25
PAS hold		Swing		

Kelantan state election, 2004
Party	Candidate	Votes	%	∆%
PAS	Hassan Mohamood	8,478	55.56	▼9.34
BN	Mohd Zulkifli Zakaria	6,780	44.44	▲9.34
Total valid votes		15,258	100.00	
Total rejected ballots		209		
Unreturned ballots		116		
Turnout		15,583	84.77	▲5.48
Registered electors		18,382		
Majority		1,698	11.13	▼18.69
PAS hold		Swing		

Kelantan state election, 1999
Party	Candidate	Votes	%	∆%
PAS	Hassan Mohamood	8,177	64.91	▲5.20
BN	Mohd Zin Yassin	4,421	35.09	▼4.31
Total valid votes		12,598	100.00	
Total rejected ballots		296		
Unreturned ballots		21		
Turnout		12,915	79.30	▲0.45
Registered electors		16,287		
Majority		3,756	29.81	▲9.51
PAS hold		Swing		

Kelantan state election, 1995
Party	Candidate	Votes	%	∆%
PAS	Hassan Mohamood	7,191	59.71	▼11.13
BN	Azaki Ishak	4,746	39.41	▲10.24
AKIM	Raja Harun R. Ismail	107	0.89	▲0.89
Total valid votes		12,044	100.00	
Total rejected ballots		271		
Unreturned ballots		20		
Turnout		12,335	78.84	▼3.63
Registered electors		15,645		
Majority		2,445	20.30	▼21.38
PAS hold		Swing		

Kelantan state election, 1990
Party	Candidate	Votes	%	∆%
PAS	Idris Ahmad	8,808	70.84	▲19.79
BN	Zainal Abidin Che Wail	3,626	29.16	▼19.79
Total valid votes		12,434	100.00	
Total rejected ballots		358		
Unreturned ballots		0		
Turnout		12,792	82.47	▲1.29
Registered electors		15,511		
Majority		5,182	41.68	▲39.58
PAS hold		Swing		

Kelantan state election, 1986
Party	Candidate	Votes	%	∆%
PAS	Idris Ahmad	5,641	51.05	▼1.43
BN	Mohamad Hassan	5,409	48.95	▲1.43
Total valid votes		11,050	100.00	
Total rejected ballots		367		
Unreturned ballots		0		
Turnout		11,417	81.18	▼3.86
Registered electors		14,064		
Majority		232	2.10	▼2.86
PAS hold		Swing		

Kelantan state election, 1982
Party	Candidate	Votes	%	∆%
PAS	Idris Ahmad	5,784	52.48	▲9.49
BN	Hassan Abdullah	5,237	47.52	▲47.52
Total valid votes		11,021	100.00	
Total rejected ballots		265		
Unreturned ballots		0		
Turnout		11,286	85.04	▲6.18
Registered electors		13,272		
Majority		547	4.96	▼9.06
PAS gain from Pan-Malaysian Islamic Front		Swing		-

Kelantan state election, 1978
Party	Candidate	Votes	%	∆%
Pan-Malaysian Islamic Front	Mohd. Daud Mohd. Ali	4,733	57.01	▲57.01
PAS	Mohd Zain Abdullah	3,569	42.99	▼40.53
Total valid votes		8,302	100.00	
Total rejected ballots		200		
Unreturned ballots		0		
Turnout		8,502	78.86	▲4.60
Registered electors		10,781		
Majority		1,164	14.02	▼61.57
Pan-Malaysian Islamic Front gain from BN		Swing		-

Kelantan state election, 1974
Party	Candidate	Votes	%
BN	Mohd. Nor Yusoff	6,087	83.52
Independent	Zarawi Mohammad	578	7.93
Parti Rakyat Malaysia	Ismail Awang	353	4.84
Independent	Abd. Ghani Kundor	270	3.70
Total valid votes		7,288	100.00
Total rejected ballots		162	
Unreturned ballots		0	
Turnout		7,450	74.26
Registered electors		10,032	
Majority		5,509	75.59
This was a new constituency created.
