= Ahmad Ali (Arain politician) =

Arain politician (1914–1980)

Sardar Ahmad Ali

Chairman District Board Lahore
- Incumbent
- Assumed office 1950

President of the Pakistan Muslim League
- Incumbent
- Assumed office 1950

Personal details
- Born: 1913 Ganja Kalan, Dipalpur
- Died: 1980 (aged 66–67)
- Party: Pakistan Muslim League
- Parent: Sardar Muhammad Ali
- Occupation: Politician, Chief of the Arain tribe

Sardar Ahmad Ali (1914–1980), was the only son of Sardar Muhammad Ali and the Chief of the Arain tribe. Like his ancestors he was the head of the Apex body of the Arain Clan called Anjuman-e-Arayan-e-Pakistan which was founded by his ancestors. Besides serving the country and its people, in various capacities, he served the cause of the Arain peoples throughout his life.he was also close friend to the bhuttos

== Early years ==
Sardar Ahmad Ali hailed from the revered Daula Arain Family of Dipalpur which traces its origin from the village Ghazna, Afghanistan. Sardar Ahmad Ali was born in 1914 in his ancestral village Ganja Kalan. His father Sardar Muhammad Ali, apart from having a vast estate, was also an honorary magistrate during the later part of the British rule but died at an early age. He married a Bengali woman from a reputed family in East Bengal.

== Chairman District Board ==
Sardar Ahmad Ali started his political career at the age of 18 when he was elected Member District Board Lahore in 1930's. In the year 1950, the Sardar Sahib was elected as the first President of the Pakistan Muslim League and the President of the Punjab Council of all district boards.

== Public Service ==
In 1950 Sardar Ahmad Ali defeated Nawab Qizalbash and was elected Chairman District Board Lahore. He was also elected to the Provincial and the National Assemblies throughout his political career until 1970 and headed a powerful group of MPs, along with Sardar Muhammad Hussain and another cousin Sardar Amjad Masood, which kept a check on the government.

== Pakistan Movement ==
Since His elder cousin Sardar Muhammad Hussain was an MLA in the 1937 Provincial Assembly and was elected to all the Punjab Assemblies before partition, including the historic elections of 1946 and He was further elected a member of the Punjab Assemblies after 1947 and a member of the West Pakistan Assembly and also remained the President of the Lahore District Muslim League, member of Punjab PML working committee before 1947, besides being the Chief of the Arain Council and later head of the Muslim league in Kasur, therefore Sardar Ahmad Ali was introduced to Mr Jinnah when Mr. Jinnah attended a meeting and public rally near Usmanwala (the headquarter of the family) and where Mr. Jinnah encouraged the young Ahmad Ali to enter into the field of public service.

The family has the honour of being one of the founding families of Pakistan as Sardar Muhammad Hussain along with a cousin hailing from the famous Burj Jewa Khan family, both MLA's in the undivided India, cast two votes in favour of the creation of Pakistan.

== Legacy ==
His actions included service to the Arain people regarding their unity. Zulfiqar Ali Bhutto, whose father Shah Nawaz Bhutto attended the All India Arain Conference in 1927 at Ganja Kalan, interacted with Sardar Sahib regarding the Arain people while serving as Prime Minister. President Zia-ul-Haq met with Sardar Sahib to offer a position in exchange for support, though the requested support was not provided to the President's expectations. He departed from the Muslim League and Pakistan in 1970 to support the 1971 Bangladesh Independence Movement.

During his political career in Pakistan, he devoted special attention to education and therefore caused numerous government primary and high schools to be established throughout the Lahore District and Kasur. People still remember him for this service. His political career in Bangladesh was short-lived due to illness but he continued to devote special attention to education, environment and developing the jute industry in the region of Jessore, Bangladesh. He is still remembered for his philanthropic contributions, which the living members of the Sardar family has continued ever since.

== Other Positions ==
Other elected positions that Sardar Ahmad Ali held were: 1. Chairman, Public Accounts Committee 2. Chairman Lahore Gymkhana Club (3 Terms) 3. President, Punjab Provincial Co-operative Bank (27 Years)
