= Kuala Krai (federal constituency) =

Federal constituency of Kelantan, Malaysia

Kuala Krai (P031)
Kelantan constituency
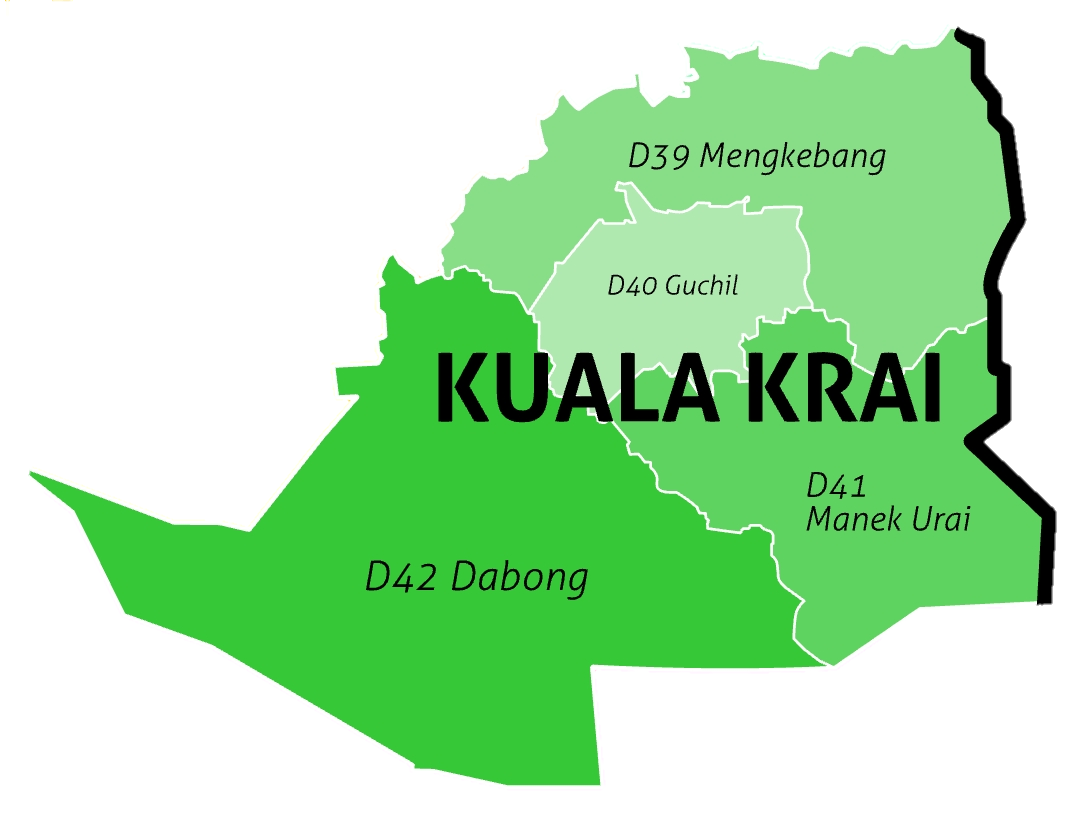

Federal constituency
- Legislature: Dewan Rakyat
- MP: Abdul Latiff Abdul Rahman; PN
- Constituency created: 1974
- First contested: 1974
- Last contested: 2022

Demographics
- Population (2020): 105,007
- Electors (2023): 92,494
- Area (km²): 2,288
- Pop. density (per km²): 45.9

Kuala Krai is a federal constituency in Kuala Krai District, Kelantan, Malaysia, that has been represented in the Dewan Rakyat since 1974.

The federal constituency was created in the 1974 redistribution and is mandated to return a single member to the Dewan Rakyat under the first past the post voting system.

== Demographics ==
https://live.chinapress.com.my/ge15/parliament/KELANTAN

Ethnic breakdown of Kuala Krai's electorate as of 2022
1. Malay (94.1%)
2. Chinese (4.09%)
3. Indian (1.12%)
4. Other ethnicities (0.67%)

As of 2020, Kuala Krai has a population of 105,007 people.

Age breakdown of Kuala Krai's electorate as of 2022
1. 18-20 (7.07%)
2. 21-29 (24.0%)
3. 30-39 (25.1%)
4. 40-49 (17.2%)
5. 50-59 (12.4%)
6. 60-69 (8.85%)
7. 70-79 (3.97%)
8. 80-89 (1.21%)
9. above 90 (0.24%)
Gender breakdown of Kuala Krai's electorate as of 2022
1. Male (50.1%)
2. Female (49.9%)

== History ==
=== Polling districts ===
According to the federal gazette issued on 18 July 2023, the Kuala Krai constituency is divided into 43 polling districts.

State constituency	Polling districts	Code	Location
Mengkebang (N39)	Pasir Kelang	031/39/01	SK Pasir Kelang
Mengkebang (N39)	Kuala Nal	031/39/02	SK Kuala Nal
Mengkebang (N39)	Bukit Sireh	031/39/03	SK Kampong Bedal
Mengkebang (N39)	Batu Jong	031/39/04	SK Batu Jong
Mengkebang (N39)	Keroh	031/39/05	SMK Keroh
Mengkebang (N39)	Pasir Gajah	031/39/06	SK Pasir Gajah
Mengkebang (N39)	Telekong	031/39/07	SK Telekong
Mengkebang (N39)	Sungai Durian	031/39/08	SK Sungai Embak
Mengkebang (N39)	Chenulang	031/39/09	SK Chenulang
Mengkebang (N39)	R.K.T Mengkebang	031/39/10	SK Batu Mengkebang
Mengkebang (N39)	R.P.T Sungai Pas	031/39/11	SK Sungai Pas
Guchil (N40)	Ladang Taku	031/40/01	SK Ladang Taku
Guchil (N40)	Kampung Bharu Guchil Utara	031/40/02	SMK Kuala Krai
Guchil (N40)	Sri Guchil	031/40/03	Kolej Vokesional Kuala Krai
Guchil (N40)	Kampung Bharu Guchil Tengah	031/40/04	SK Banggol Guchil
Guchil (N40)	Kampung Bharu Guchil Selatan	031/40/05	SK Sultan Yahya Petra (2)
Guchil (N40)	Bandar Kuala Krai	031/40/06	SJK (C) Yuk Chai
Guchil (N40)	Kg Hamzah	031/40/07	SMK Sultan Yahya Petra 1
Guchil (N40)	Rkt Bahagia	031/40/08	SK Bahagia
Guchil (N40)	Tualang	031/40/09	SK Kuala Krai
Guchil (N40)	Kenor	031/40/10	SK Kampong Tengah
Guchil (N40)	Kuala Pahi	031/40/11	SMK Pahi
Guchil (N40)	Pahi	031/40/12	SK Pahi
Manek Urai (N41)	Temalir	031/41/01	SK Temalir
Manek Urai (N41)	Sungai Perial	031/41/02	SK Peria
Manek Urai (N41)	Manek Urai Lama	031/41/03	SK Manek Urai
Manek Urai (N41)	Manek Urai Baru	031/41/04	SK Manek Urai Baru
Manek Urai (N41)	Sungai Sok	031/41/05	SK Sungai Sok
Manek Urai (N41)	Chuchoh Puteri	031/41/06	SK Chuchoh Puteri
Manek Urai (N41)	Lata Rek	031/41/07	SK Lata Rek
Manek Urai (N41)	Manjor	031/41/08	SK Kampong Karangan
Manek Urai (N41)	Laloh	031/41/09	SMK Laloh
Dabong (N42)	Kandek	031/42/01	SMA (Arab) Nurul Ihsan
Dabong (N42)	Kuala Gris	031/42/02	SK Kuala Geris
Dabong (N42)	Dabong	031/42/03	SMK Dabong
Dabong (N42)	Jelawang	031/42/04	SK Mempelam Jelawang
Dabong (N42)	Kemubu	031/42/05	SK Kemubu
Dabong (N42)	Bintang	031/42/06	SK Seri Mahligai
Dabong (N42)	Bukit Abu	031/42/07	Dewan Ladang Bukit Abu
Dabong (N42)	Temiang	031/42/08	SK Slow Temiang
Dabong (N42)	Kampung Sungai Mel	031/42/09	SK Sungai Mengkuang
Dabong (N42)	Pemberian	031/42/10	SK Pemberian
Dabong (N42)	Olak Jeram	031/41/11	SK Sg Sam
Dabong (N42)	Biak	031/41/12	SK Biak

=== Representation history ===
Members of Parliament for Kuala Krai
Parliament	No	Years	Member	Party	Vote Share
Constituency created from Ulu Kelantan
Kuala Kerai
4th	P026	1974–1978	Mohd. Zahari Awang (محمد ظهري أواڠ)	BN (PAS)	10,206; 79.23%
5th	P026	1978–1982	Nik Hussein Wan Abdul Rahman (نئ حسين وان عبدالرحمن)	BN (UMNO)	9,108; 59.59%
6th	P026	1982–1986	Nik Hussein Wan Abdul Rahman (نئ حسين وان عبدالرحمن)	BN (UMNO)	10,896; 55.31%
Kuala Krai
7th	P028	1986–1990	Mohamed Isa (محمد عيسى)	BN (UMNO)	12,240; 54.23%
8th	P028	1990–1995	Ibrahim Mahmood (إبراهيم محمود)	APU (PAS)	18,366; 68.44%
9th	P031	1995–1999	Ibrahim Mahmood (إبراهيم محمود)	APU (PAS)	14,933; 56.01%
10th	P031	1999–2004	Mohamed Nasir Che Daud (محمد ناصر چئ داود)	BA (PAS)	16,837; 56.88%
11th	P031	2004–2008	Mohamed Razali Che Mamat (محمد غزالي چئ مامت)	BN (UMNO)	19,148; 53.57%
12th	P031	2008–2013	Mohd Hatta Md Ramli (محمد حتّى مد رملي)	PR (PAS)	23,562; 55.91%
13th	P031	2013–2015	Mohd Hatta Md Ramli (محمد حتّى مد رملي)	PR (PAS)	27,919; 51.90%
13th	P031	2015–2018	Mohd Hatta Md Ramli (محمد حتّى مد رملي)	AMANAH	27,919; 51.90%
14th	P031	2018–2020	Abdul Latiff Abdul Rahman (عبد اللطيف عبد الرحمٰن)	GS (PAS)	28,903; 52.56%
14th	P031	2020–2022	Abdul Latiff Abdul Rahman (عبد اللطيف عبد الرحمٰن)	PN (PAS)	28,903; 52.56%
15th	P031	2022–present	Abdul Latiff Abdul Rahman (عبد اللطيف عبد الرحمٰن)	PN (PAS)	42,740; 66.08%

=== State constituency ===
Parliamentary constituency	State constituency						
Parliamentary constituency	1955–1959*	1959–1974	1974–1986	1986–1995	1995–2004	2004–2018	2018–present
Kuala Krai						Dabong	
Kuala Krai			Guchil				
Kuala Krai				Manek Urai			
Kuala Krai					Mengkebang		
Kuala Krai			Pahi				
Kuala Krai			Temangan				

=== Historical boundaries ===
State Constituency	Area				
State Constituency	1974	1984	1994	2003	2018
Dabong				Dabong; Jelawang; Kampung Sungai Batu; Kuala Gris; Sri Bintang	
Guchil	Chenulang; Guchil; Kampung Enggong; Kuala Pahi; Mengkebang	Guchil; Kampung Hamzah; Kuala Krai; Kuala Pahi; Mengkebang	Guchil; Kampung Batu Lada; Kampung Hamzah; Kuala Krai; Kuala Pahi		
Manek Urai		Chucoh Puteri; Kampung Sungai Peria; Manek Urai; Padang Sembilan; Sungai Sok	Chucoh Puteri; Kampung Sungai Peria; Kampung Tanjung Batu; Manek Urai; Sungai Sok		
Mengkebang			Batu Jong; Kuala Nal; Mengkebang; Pasir Kelang; Sungai Pas		
Pahi	Kampung Dusun Damar; Kampung Pusat Tujoh; Kampung Tualang; Kuala Krai; Pahi				
Temangan	Jambu Lawar; Kampung Banggol Kulim; Kampung Pek; Kampung Telekong; Temangan	Batu Jong; Kampung Miang; Kampung Kerilla; Kampung Kerong; Temangan			

=== Current state assembly members ===
No.	State Constituency	Member	Coalition (Party)
N39	Mengkebang	Zubir Abu Bakar	PN (PAS)
N40	Guchil	Hilmi Abdullah	PN (PAS)
N41	Manek Urai	Mohd Fauzi Abdullah	PN (PAS)
N42	Dabong	Ku Mohd Zaki Ku Hussin	PN (PAS)

=== Local governments & postcodes ===
No.	State Constituency	Local Government	Postcode
N39	Mengkebang	Kuala Krai District Council	18000, 18050 Kuala Krai; 18200 Dabong
N40	Guchil	Kuala Krai District Council	18000, 18050 Kuala Krai; 18200 Dabong
N41	Manek Urai	Kuala Krai District Council; Dabong District Council (Kampung Slow Temiang and Olak Jeram areas)	18000, 18050 Kuala Krai; 18200 Dabong
N42	Dabong	Dabong District Council	18000, 18050 Kuala Krai; 18200 Dabong

== Election results ==
Malaysian general election, 2022
Party	Candidate	Votes	%	∆%
PAS	Abdul Latiff Abdul Rahman	42,740	66.08	▲13.52
BN	Mohd Zulkepli Omar	17,552	27.14	▼10.89
PH	Mohamad Hisyamuddin Ghazali	4,148	6.41	▲6.41
PEJUANG	Norashikin Che Umar	241	0.37	▲0.37
Total valid votes		64,681	100.00	
Total rejected ballots		796		
Unreturned ballots		207		
Turnout		65,684	70.05	▼9.95
Registered electors		92,335		
Majority		25,188	38.94	▲24.41
PAS hold		Swing		
Source(s) https://lom.agc.gov.my/ilims/upload/portal/akta/outputp/1753266/PUB%20607%20(2022).pdf

Malaysian general election, 2018
Party	Candidate	Votes	%	∆%
PAS	Abdul Latiff Abdul Rahman	28,903	52.56	▲0.66
BN	Ramzi Ab Rahman	20,911	38.03	▼10.07
PKR	Mohd. Yazid Abdullah	5,173	9.41	▲9.41
Total valid votes		54,987	100.00	
Total rejected ballots		861		
Unreturned ballots		430		
Turnout		56,278	80.00	▼6.60
Registered electors		70,348		
Majority		7,992	14.53	▲10.73
PAS hold		Swing		
Source(s) "His Majesty's Government Gazette - Notice of Contested Election, Parliament for the State of Kelantan [P.U. (B) 234/2018]" (PDF). Attorney General's Chambers of Malaysia. 3 May 2018. "Federal Government Gazette - Results of Contested Election and Statements of the Poll after the Official Addition of Votes, Parliamentary Constituencies for the State of Kelantan [P.U. (B) 308/2018]" (PDF). Attorney General's Chambers of Malaysia. 28 May 2018.

Malaysian general election, 2013
Party	Candidate	Votes	%	∆%
PAS	Mohd Hatta Md Ramli	27,919	51.90	▼4.01
BN	Tuan Aziz Tuan Mat	25,876	48.10	▲4.01
Total valid votes		53,795	100.00	
Total rejected ballots		720		
Unreturned ballots		128		
Turnout		54,643	86.60	▲4.28
Registered electors		63,101		
Majority		2,043	3.80	▼8.02
PAS hold		Swing		
Source(s) "Federal Government Gazette - Notice of Contested Election, Parliament for the State of Kelantan [P.U. (B) 171/2013]" (PDF). Attorney General's Chambers of Malaysia. 26 April 2013. "Federal Government Gazette - Results of Contested Election and Statements of the Poll after the Official Addition of Votes, Parliamentary Constituencies for the State of Kelantan [P.U. (B) 212/2013]" (PDF). Attorney General's Chambers of Malaysia. 22 May 2013. Archived from the original (PDF) on 2019-12-29.

Malaysian general election, 2008
Party	Candidate	Votes	%	∆%
PAS	Mohd Hatta Md Ramli	23,562	55.91	▲9.28
BN	Che Musa Che Omar	18,578	44.09	▼9.28
Total valid votes		42,140	100.00	
Total rejected ballots		756		
Unreturned ballots		117		
Turnout		43,013	82.32	▲1.30
Registered electors		52,250		
Majority		4,984	11.82	▲5.08
PAS gain from BN		Swing		?

Malaysian general election, 2004
Party	Candidate	Votes	%	∆%
BN	Mohamed Razali Che Mamat	19,148	53.37	▲10.25
PAS	Wan Abdul Rahim Wan Abdullah	16,732	46.63	▼10.25
Total valid votes		35,880	100.00	
Total rejected ballots		785		
Unreturned ballots		2		
Turnout		36,667	81.02	▲3.49
Registered electors		45,256		
Majority		2,416	6.74	▼7.02
BN gain from PAS		Swing		?

Malaysian general election, 1999
Party	Candidate	Votes	%	∆%
PAS	Mohamed Nasir Che Daud	16,837	56.88	▲0.87
BN	Dr. Nik Hussein Wan Abdul Rahman	12,765	43.12	▼0.87
Total valid votes		29,602	100.00	
Total rejected ballots		528		
Unreturned ballots		22		
Turnout		30,152	77.53	▲1.39
Registered electors		38,890		
Majority		4,072	13.76	▲1.74
PAS hold		Swing		

Malaysian general election, 1995
Party	Candidate	Votes	%	∆%
PAS	Ibrahim Mahmood	14,933	56.01	▼12.43
BN	Wan Zaid Wan Abdullah	11,727	43.99	▲12.43
Total valid votes		26,660	100.00	
Total rejected ballots		959		
Unreturned ballots		82		
Turnout		27,701	76.14	▼4.03
Registered electors		36,381		
Majority		3,206	12.02	▼24.86
PAS hold		Swing		

Malaysian general election, 1990
Party	Candidate	Votes	%	∆%
PAS	Ibrahim Mahmood	18,366	68.44	▲22.67
BN	Zahari Awang	8,471	31.56	▼22.67
Total valid votes		26,837	100.00	
Total rejected ballots		684		
Unreturned ballots		0		
Turnout		27,521	80.17	▲2.26
Registered electors		34,330		
Majority		9,895	36.88	▲28.42
PAS gain from BN		Swing		?

Malaysian general election, 1986
Party	Candidate	Votes	%	∆%
BN	Mohamed Isa	12,240	54.23	▼1.08
PAS	Khalid Abdul Samad	10,330	45.77	▲1.08
Total valid votes		22,570	100.00	
Total rejected ballots		557		
Unreturned ballots		0		
Turnout		23,127	77.91	▼4.98
Registered electors		29,684		
Majority		1,910	8.46	▼2.16
BN hold		Swing		

Malaysian general election, 1982
Party	Candidate	Votes	%	∆%
BN	Nik Hussein Wan Abdul Rahman	10,896	55.31	▼4.28
PAS	Mohamed Zahari Awang	8,804	44.69	▲4.28
Total valid votes		19,700	100.00	
Total rejected ballots		562		
Unreturned ballots		0		
Turnout		20,262	82.89	▲4.42
Registered electors		24,445		
Majority		2,092	10.62	▼8.56
BN hold		Swing		

Malaysian general election, 1978
Party	Candidate	Votes	%	∆%
BN	Nik Hussein Wan Abdul Rahman	9,108	59.59	▼19.64
PAS	Mohd. Zahari Awang	6,177	40.41	▲40.41
Total valid votes		15,285	100.00	
Total rejected ballots		172		
Unreturned ballots		0		
Turnout		15,457	78.47	▲5.07
Registered electors		19,697		
Majority		2,931	19.18	▼39.28
BN hold		Swing		

Malaysian general election, 1974
Party	Candidate	Votes	%
BN	Mohd. Zahari Awang	10,206	79.23
Independent	Wan Ismail Wan Ahmad	2,676	20.77
Total valid votes		12,882	100.00
Total rejected ballots		807	
Unreturned ballots		0	
Turnout		13,689	73.40
Registered electors		18,650	
Majority		7,530	58.46
This was a new constituency created.
