= Lumut (federal constituency) =

Federal constituency in Perak, Malaysia

Lumut (P074)
Perak constituency

Federal constituency
- Legislature: Dewan Rakyat
- MP: Nordin Ahmad Ismail; PN
- Constituency created: 1974
- First contested: 1974
- Last contested: 2022

Demographics
- Population (2020): 124,320
- Electors (2022): 92,972
- Area (km²): 343
- Pop. density (per km²): 362.4

Lumut is a federal constituency in Manjung District, Perak, Malaysia, that has been represented in the Dewan Rakyat since 1974.

The federal constituency was created in the 1974 redistribution and is mandated to return a single member to the Dewan Rakyat under the first past the post voting system.

During 2016 redelineation, the Sitiawan state constituency was transferred to Beruas, reducing Lumut from three to only two constituencies.

== Demographics ==
Ethnic breakdown of Lumut's electorate as of 2022
1. Malay (72.5%)
2. Chinese (13.9%)
3. Indian (11.3%)
4. Other ethnicities (2.30%)

As of 2020, Lumut has a population of 124,320 people.

Age breakdown of Lumut's electorate as of 2022
1. 18–20 (6.61%)
2. 21–29 (23.9%)
3. 30–39 (25.1%)
4. 40–49 (17.0%)
5. 50–59 (12.4%)
6. 60–69 (9.62%)
7. 70–79 (3.97%)
8. 80–89 (1.02%)
9. above 90 (0.25%)
Gender breakdown of Lumut's electorate as of 2022
1. Male (52.5%)
2. Female (47.5%)

== History ==
=== Polling districts ===
According to the federal gazette issued on 31 October 2022, the Lumut constituency is divided into 26 polling districts.

State constituency	Polling District	Code	Location
Pasir Panjang (N51)	Kampong Telok	074/51/01	SK Telaga Nanas
Pasir Panjang (N51)	Kampong Bahru	074/51/02	SK Kampong Bahru
Pasir Panjang (N51)	Sungai Wangi	074/51/03	SK Sungai Wangi
Pasir Panjang (N51)	Ladang Sungai Wangi	074/51/04	SJK (T) Ladang Sg. Wangi II
Pasir Panjang (N51)	Kampong Sitiawan	074/51/05	SK Sitiawan; SMK Ahmad Boestamam
Pasir Panjang (N51)	Samudera	074/51/06	SMK Seri Samudera; SJK (C) Eng Ling; SK Seri Sitiawan; SK Seri Samudera
Pasir Panjang (N51)	Pundut	074/51/07	SK Seri Bayu
Pasir Panjang (N51)	Bandar Baru Seri Manjung	074/51/08	SK Seri Manjung
Pasir Panjang (N51)	Seri Manjung	074/51/09	SMK Seri Manjung; Kolej Vokasional Seri Manjung
Pasir Panjang (N51)	Kampong Dato Sri Kamarudin	074/51/10	SK Kpg Dato' Seri Kamaruddin
Pasir Panjang (N51)	Pasir Panjang	074/51/11	SK Muhammad Saman
Pasir Panjang (N51)	Batu 8 Lekir	074/51/12	SK Lekir
Pasir Panjang (N51)	FELCRA Lekir	074/51/13	SK Gugusan Lekir
Pasir Panjang (N51)	Lekir	074/51/14	SK Batu Sepuluh
Pasir Panjang (N51)	Lekir Tengah	074/51/15	Dewan Seberguna Batu 15, Lekir
Pasir Panjang (N51)	Sungai Tiram Lekir	074/51/16	SK Sungai Tiram
Pasir Panjang (N51)	Kayan	074/51/17	SK Kayan
Pangkor (N52)	Damar Laut	074/52/01	SK Nakhoda Muhammad Taib
Pangkor (N52)	Lumut	074/52/02	SK Methodist (ACS)
Pangkor (N52)	Telok Muroh	074/52/03	SK Dato' Ishak
Pangkor (N52)	Pengkalan TLDM	074/52/04	SMK Dindings
Pangkor (N52)	Sungai Pinang Besar	074/52/05	SJK (C) Hwa Lian (2)
Pangkor (N52)	Sungai Pinang Kechil	074/52/06	SJK (T) Pangkor
Pangkor (N52)	Pasir Bogak	074/52/07	SMK Pangkor
Pangkor (N52)	Pekan Pangkor	074/52/08	SK Seri Pangkor
Pangkor (N52)	Telok Gedong	074/52/09	SM Tahfiz Darul Ridzuan Daerah Manjung, Pulau Pangkor

=== Representation history ===
Members of Parliament for Lumut
Parliament	No	Years	Member	Party	Vote Share
Constituency created, renamed from Sitiawan
4th	P060	1974–1978	Richard Ho Ung Hun (何文翰)	BN (MCA)	8,792; 45.60%
5th	P060	1978–1982	Richard Ho Ung Hun (何文翰)	BN (MCA)	15,021; 58.63%
6th	P060	1982–1986	Ng Cheng Kuai (黄秋贵)	BN (MCA)	14,586; 50.99%
7th	P068	1986–1990	Ng Cheng Kuai (黄秋贵)	BN (MCA)	15,792; 48.63%
8th	P068	1990–1995	Ling Chooi Sieng (林水仙)	BN (MCA)	22,161; 56.18%
9th	P071	1995–1999	Yap Yit Thong (叶逸堂)	BN (MCA)	25,291; 66.49%
10th	P071	1999–2004	Kong Cho Ha (江作汉)	BN (MCA)	20,661; 50.74%
11th	P074	2004–2008	Kong Cho Ha (江作汉)	BN (MCA)	27,415; 63.44%
12th	P074	2008–2013	Kong Cho Ha (江作汉)	BN (MCA)	25,698; 50.29%
13th	P074	2013–2015	Mohamad Imran Abd Hamid (محمد عمران عبدالحميد)	PR (PKR)	40,308; 55.64%
13th	P074	2015–2018	Mohamad Imran Abd Hamid (محمد عمران عبدالحميد)	PH (PKR)	40,308; 55.64%
14th	P074	2018–2022	Mohd Hatta Md Ramli (محمد حتّى مد رملي)	PH (AMANAH)	21,955; 40.93%
15th	P074	2022–present	Nordin Ahmad Ismail (نوردين أحمد إسماعيل)	PN (BERSATU)	25,212; 35.43%

=== State constituency ===
Parliamentary constituency	State constituency						
Parliamentary constituency	1955–1959*	1959–1974	1974–1986	1986–1995	1995–2004	2004–2018	2018–present
Lumut			Pangkor				
Lumut					Pasir Panjang		
Lumut			Sitiawan				

=== Historical boundaries ===
State Constituency	Area				
State Constituency	1974	1984	1994	2003	2018
Pangkor	Kampung Koh; Pangkor; Pasir Panjang; Seri Manjung; Teluk Muroh	Damar Laut; Dindings; Lumut; Pangkor; Seri Manjung	Damar Laut; Dindings; Lumut; Pangkor; Sungai Pinang		
Pasir Panjang			Kampung Sitiawan; Lekir; Pasir Panjang; Seri Manjung; Taman Lumut Mewah		FELCRA Lekir; Kampung Sitiawan; Lekir; Pasir Panjang; Seri Manjung
Sitiawan	Lumut; Lekir; Simpang Dua; Simpang Lima; Sitiawan	Kampung Koh; Lekir; Pasir Panjang; Simpang Lima; Sitiawan	Pekan Gurney; FELCRA Lekir; Kampung Koh; Simpang Lima; Sitiawan		

=== Current state assembly members ===
No.	State Constituency	Member	Coalition (Party)
N51	Pasir Panjang	Rosli Abd Rahman	PN (PAS)
N52	Pangkor	Norhaslinda Zakaria	PN (BERSATU)

=== Local governments & postcodes ===
No.	State Constituency	Local Government	Postcode
N51	Pasir Panjang	Manjung Municipal Council	32000 Sitiawan; 32040 Seri Manjong; 32100, 32200 Lumut; 32300 Pangkor; 32400 Ayer Tawar
N52	Pangkor	Manjung Municipal Council	32000 Sitiawan; 32040 Seri Manjong; 32100, 32200 Lumut; 32300 Pangkor; 32400 Ayer Tawar

== Election results ==
Malaysian general election, 2022
Party	Candidate	Votes	%	∆%
PN	Nordin Ahmad Ismail	25,212	35.43	▲35.43
BN	Zambry Abdul Kadir	24,849	34.92	▼5.26
PH	Mohd Hatta Ramli	20,358	28.61	▲28.61
PEJUANG	Mazlan Abdul Ghani	385	0.54	▲0.54
Heritage	Mohd Isnin Ismail	358	0.50	▲0.50
Total valid votes		71,162	100.00	
Total rejected ballots		990		
Unreturned ballots		520		
Turnout		72,672	76.54	▼5.42
Registered electors		92,972		
Majority		363	0.51	▼0.24
PN gain from PKR		Swing		?
Source(s) https://lom.agc.gov.my/ilims/upload/portal/akta/outputp/1753277/PUB610%20PARLIMEN%20PERAK.pdf

Malaysian general election, 2018
Party	Candidate	Votes	%	∆%
PKR	Mohd Hatta Md Ramli	21,955	40.93	▼14.71
BN	Zambry Abdul Kadir	21,555	40.18	▼4.18
PAS	Mohammed Zamri Ibrahim	10,135	18.89	▲18.89
Total valid votes		53,645	100.00	
Total rejected ballots		1,081		
Unreturned ballots		316		
Turnout		55,042	81.96	▼1.57
Registered electors		67,157		
Majority		400	0.75	▼10.53
PKR hold		Swing		?
Source(s) "His Majesty's Government Gazette - Notice of Contested Election, Parliament for the State of Perak [P.U. (B) 237/2018]" (PDF). Attorney General's Chambers of Malaysia. 3 May 2018. "Federal Government Gazette - Results of Contested Election and Statements of the Poll after the Official Addition of Votes, Parliamentary Constituencies for the State of Perak [P.U. (B) 311/2018]" (PDF). Attorney General's Chambers of Malaysia. 28 May 2018.

Malaysian general election, 2013
Party	Candidate	Votes	%	∆%
PKR	Mohamad Imran Abd Hamid	40,308	55.64	▲5.93
BN	Kong Cho Ha	32,140	44.36	▼6.13
Total valid votes		72,448	100.00	
Total rejected ballots		1,133		
Unreturned ballots		172		
Turnout		73,753	83.53	▲6.66
Registered electors		88,300		
Majority		8,168	11.28	▲10.70
PKR gain from BN		Swing		?
Source(s) "Federal Government Gazette - Notice of Contested Election, Parliament for the State of Perak [P.U. (B) 174/2013]" (PDF). Attorney General's Chambers of Malaysia. 26 April 2013. Archived from the original (PDF) on 2019-12-29. "Federal Government Gazette - Results of Contested Election and Statements of the Poll after the Official Addition of Votes, Parliamentary Constituencies for the State of Perak [P.U. (B) 215/2013]" (PDF). Attorney General's Chambers of Malaysia. 22 May 2013.

Malaysian general election, 2008
Party	Candidate	Votes	%	∆%
BN	Kong Cho Ha	25,698	50.29	▼13.15
PKR	Suwardi Sapuan	25,400	49.71	▲13.15
Total valid votes		51,098	100.00	
Total rejected ballots		1,884		
Unreturned ballots		2,948		
Turnout		55,930	76.87	▲3.64
Registered electors		72,763		
Majority		298	0.58	▼26.30
BN hold		Swing		

Malaysian general election, 2004
Party	Candidate	Votes	%	∆%
BN	Kong Cho Ha	27,415	63.44	▲12.70
PKR	Mustaffa Kamil Ayub	15,801	36.56	▼12.70
Total valid votes		43,216	100.00	
Total rejected ballots		1,477		
Unreturned ballots		5,486		
Turnout		50,179	73.23	▲2.10
Registered electors		68,522		
Majority		11,614	26.88	▲25.40
BN hold		Swing		

Malaysian general election, 1999
Party	Candidate	Votes	%	∆%
BN	Kong Cho Ha	20,661	50.74	▲15.75
PKR	Zaman Huri Samsudin	20,056	49.26	▲49.26
Total valid votes		40,717	100.00	
Total rejected ballots		1,372		
Unreturned ballots		8,176		
Turnout		50,265	71.13	▲1.46
Registered electors		70,438		
Majority		605	1.48	▼31.50
BN hold		Swing		

Malaysian general election, 1995
Party	Candidate	Votes	%	∆%
BN	Yap Yit Thong	25,291	66.49	▲10.31
DAP	Ling Nguk Bing @ Ling Ngik Bing	12,748	33.51	▼10.31
Total valid votes		38,039	100.00	
Total rejected ballots		2,114		
Unreturned ballots		3,487		
Turnout		43,640	69.67	▲1.26
Registered electors		62,635		
Majority		12,543	32.98	▲20.62
BN hold		Swing		

Malaysian general election, 1990
Party	Candidate	Votes	%	∆%
BN	Ling Chooi Sieng	22,161	56.18	▲7.55
DAP	Chew Pang Kee	17,287	43.82	▼0.16
Total valid votes		39,448	100.00	
Total rejected ballots		1,295		
Unreturned ballots		0		
Turnout		40,743	68.41	▲1.32
Registered electors		59,557		
Majority		4,874	12.36	▲7.71
BN hold		Swing		

Malaysian general election, 1986
Party	Candidate	Votes	%	∆%
BN	Ng Cheng Kuai	15,792	48.63	▼2.36
DAP	N. Jaganathan	14,284	43.98	▼1.02
PAS	Mohd Nadzir Mohd Jamin	2,400	7.39	▲3.38
Total valid votes		32,476	100.00	
Total rejected ballots		532		
Unreturned ballots		0		
Turnout		33,008	67.09	▼8.42
Registered electors		49,202		
Majority		1,508	4.65	▼1.34
BN hold		Swing		

Malaysian general election, 1982
Party	Candidate	Votes	%	∆%
BN	Ng Cheng Kuai	14,586	50.99	▼7.64
DAP	Ting Chek Meng	12,875	45.00	▲8.32
PAS	Mohamed Salleh Mohamed Gaus	1,147	4.01	▼0.68
Total valid votes		28,608	100.00	
Total rejected ballots		612		
Unreturned ballots		0		
Turnout		29,220	75.51	▼2.43
Registered electors		38,699		
Majority		1,711	5.99	▼15.96
BN hold		Swing		

Malaysian general election, 1978
Party	Candidate	Votes	%	∆%
BN	Richard Ho Ung Hun	15,021	58.63	▲13.03
DAP	Tin Siek Ho @ Ting Sea Leong	9,396	36.68	▼3.68
PAS	Abdul Manan Md. Bakri	1,201	4.69	▲4.69
Total valid votes		25,618	100.00	
Total rejected ballots		620		
Unreturned ballots		0		
Turnout		26,238	77.94	▲8.95
Registered electors		33,663		
Majority		5,625	21.95	▲16.71
BN hold		Swing		

Malaysian general election, 1974
Party	Candidate	Votes	%
BN	Richard Ho Ung Hun	8,792	45.60
DAP	Ting Siek Ho	7,782	40.36
Independent	Wong Ting Seng	2,707	14.04
Total valid votes		19,281	100.00
Total rejected ballots		908	
Unreturned ballots		0	
Turnout		20,189	68.99
Registered electors		29,263	
Majority		1,010	5.24
This was a new constituency created.
