= Rahman Ismail =

Malaysian politician

Rahman Ismail DMSM
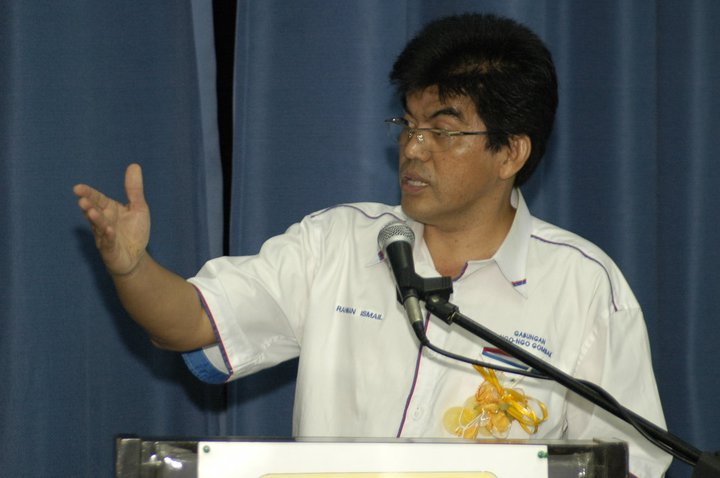
- Datuk Rahman Ismail speaking at an event as a Member of the Malaysian Parliament for Gombak, Selangor.

Member of the Malaysian Parliament for Gombak
- In office 2004 – 8 March 2008
- Majority: 13,207 (2004)
- Preceded by: Zaleha Ismail (UMNO-Barisan Nasional)
- Succeeded by: Mohamed Azmin Ali (PKR-Pakatan Rakyat)

Personal details
- Born: Rahman bin Ismail
- Party: United Malays National Organisation (UMNO) (1986 - current)
- Other political affiliations: Barisan Nasional (BN) (1986-present); Muafakat Nasional (MN) (2019-present)
- Spouse: Dr Noor Akma
- Children: 1 daughter, 2 sons
- Education: Sekolah Sultan Alam Shah; Universiti Kebangsaan Malaysia
- Occupation: Medical doctor Member of Parliament

Rahman bin Ismail is a Malaysian physician and politician who served as the Member of Parliament for Gombak from 2004 to 2008.

He is a member of the United Malays National Organisation (UMNO), a component party of the Barisan Nasional (BN) coalition.

== Education ==
Rahman received his early education at Sultan Alam Shah School. He later studied medicine at the University Kebangsaan Malaysia and the University of Malaya.

He completed postgraduate training at Johns Hopkins University, the Pasteur Institute, and the Centers for Disease Control and Prevention (CDC).

== Career ==
Rahman is a physician specializing in vaccinology, epidemiology, and clinical research. In 1997, he was appointed as the medical and scientific director for the Asia Pacific region at the vaccine manufacturer Sanofi Pasteur.

He worked as an adviser to the Public Health Specialist Society and is a member of the National Biotechnology Council.

Rahman has also been involved in clinical trials, hospital studies, epidemiological research, and infectious disease surveillance.

== Political career ==
Rahman joined UMNO in 1986 and served as a youth leader representing the party within the UMNO and BN coalition.

Rahman was nominated as a BN candidate for the 2004 general election and was elected as a Member of Parliament for Gombak, defeating Mohd Hatta Ramli of the Parti Islam Se-Malaysia (PAS). He served a single term from 2004 to 2008 and did not contest the seat in the 2008 general election.

In the 2013 general election, Rahman contested the Gombak parliamentary seat as the BN candidate, running against Azmin Ali of Parti Kedadilan Rakyat (PKR). Rahman was defeated by Azmin Ali, who won the seat by a margin of 4,734 votes.

== Election results ==
Parliament of Malaysia
Year	Constituency	Candidate	Votes	Pct	Opponent(s)	Votes	Pct	Ballots cast	Majority	Turnout
2004	P098 Gombak	Raman Ismail (UMNO)	39,870	59.19%	Mohd Hatta Ramli (PAS)	26,663	39.57%	67,358	13,207	73.04%
2013	P098 Gombak	Raman Ismail (UMNO)	50,093	46.93%	Mohamed Azmin Ali (PKR)	54,827	51.36%	107,162	4,734	86.92%
2013	P098 Gombak	Raman Ismail (UMNO)	50,093	46.93%	Said Nazar Abu Baker (IND)	474	0.44%	107,162	4,734	86.92%

== Honors ==
- Malacca
  - Companion Class I of the Exalted Order of Malacca (DMSM) – Datuk (2004)

== See also ==
- Gombak (federal constituency)
