= Zambry Abdul Kadir =

Malaysian politician (born 1962)

Yang Berhormat Senator Dato' Seri DiRaja Dr Zambry Abdul Kadir SPSA DGSM SPMP DPMP PAT AMS
- زمبري عبدالقادر
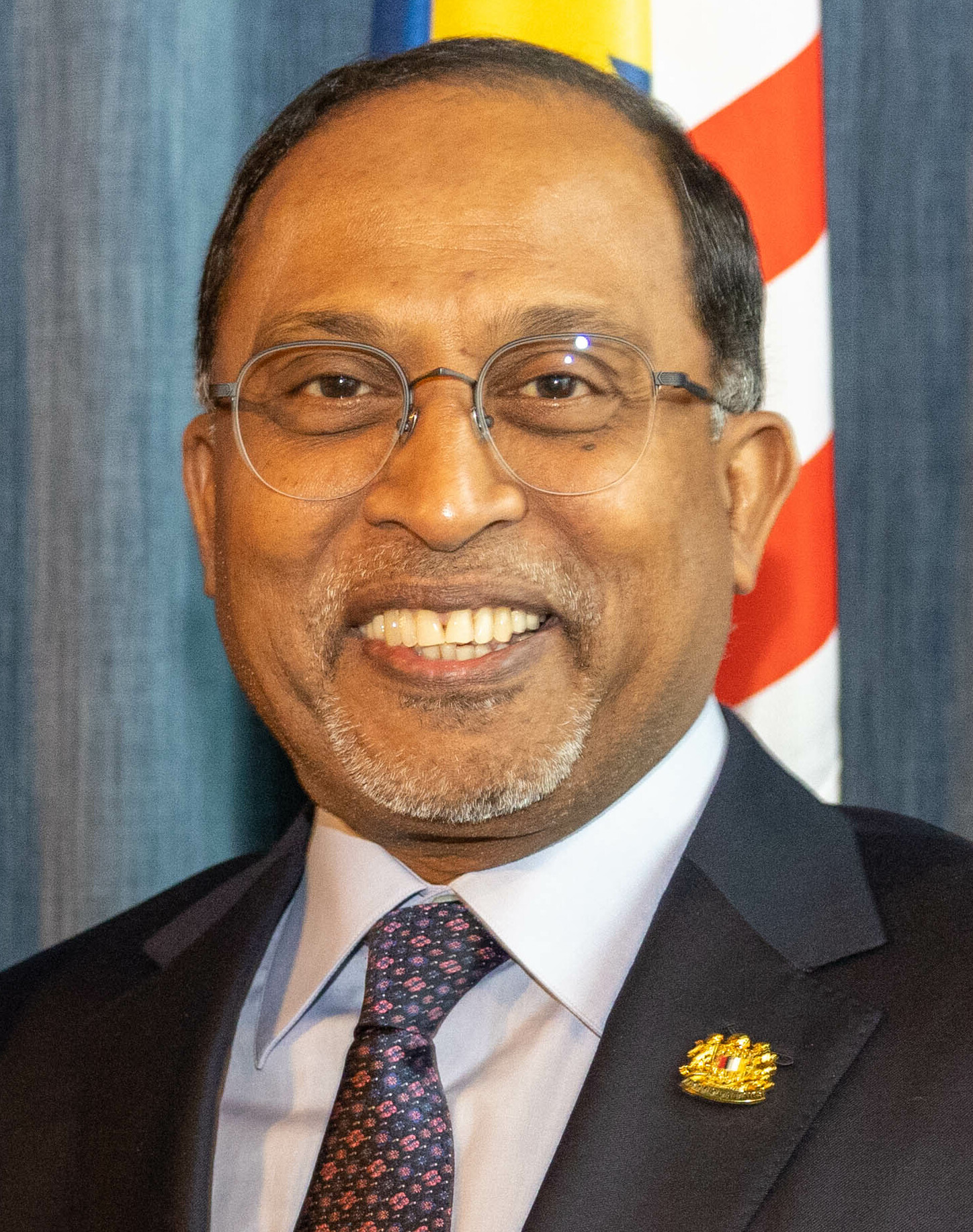
- Zambry in 2023

Minister of Higher Education
- Incumbent
- Assumed office 12 December 2023
- Monarchs: Abdullah (2023–2024); Ibrahim Iskandar (since 2024)
- Prime Minister: Anwar Ibrahim
- Deputy: Mustapha Sakmud; Adam Adli
- Preceded by: Mohamed Khaled Nordin
- Constituency: Senator

Minister of Foreign Affairs
- In office 3 December 2022 – 12 December 2023
- Monarch: Abdullah
- Prime Minister: Anwar Ibrahim
- Deputy: Mohamad Alamin
- Preceded by: Saifuddin Abdullah
- Succeeded by: Mohamad Hasan
- Constituency: Senator

Senator Appointed by the Yang di-Pertuan Agong
- Incumbent
- Assumed office 3 December 2022
- Monarchs: Abdullah (2023–2024); Ibrahim Iskandar (since 2024)
- Prime Minister: Anwar Ibrahim

Secretary-General of the Barisan Nasional
- Incumbent
- Assumed office 8 June 2021
- Chairman: Ahmad Zahid Hamidi
- Preceded by: Ahmad Maslan

Leader of the Opposition of Perak
- In office 3 July 2018 – 1 August 2018
- Monarch: Nazrin Shah
- Menteri Besar: Ahmad Faizal Azumu
- Preceded by: Mohammad Nizar Jamaluddin
- Succeeded by: Saarani Mohamad
- Constituency: Pangkor

11th Menteri Besar of Perak
- In office 12 May 2009 – 12 May 2018
- Monarchs: Azlan Shah (2009–2014); Nazrin Shah (2014–2018)
- Preceded by: Mohammad Nizar Jamaluddin
- Succeeded by: Ahmad Faizal Azumu
- Constituency: Pangkor

Member of the Perak State Executive Council (Education, Human Resources and Multimedia : 31 March 2004–28 September 2006) (Education, Higher Education, Science and Technology : 28 September 2006–16 March 2008)
- In office 31 March 2004 – 16 March 2008
- Monarch: Azlan Shah
- Menteri Besar: Tajol Rosli Mohd Ghazali
- Preceded by: Abdul Malek Mohamed Hanafiah (Education); Jamal Nasir Rasdi (Human Resources); Ramly Zahari (Multimedia)
- Succeeded by: Nga Kor Ming (Education); Su Keong Siong (Higher Education, Science and Technology)
- Constituency: Pangkor

Member of the Perak State Legislative Assembly for Pangkor
- In office 21 March 2004 – 19 November 2022
- Preceded by: Mohamad Wajdi Ishak (BN–UMNO)
- Succeeded by: Norhaslinda Zakaria (PN–BERSATU)
- Majority: 5,669 (2004); 5,785 (2008); 5,124 (2013); 1,626 (2018)

Non-independent and Non-executive Chairman of the Malaysia Airports Holdings Berhad
- In office 12 August 2020 – 15 December 2022
- Minister: Wee Ka Siong (2020–2022); Anthony Loke Siew Fook (2022)
- Preceded by: Zainun Ali
- Succeeded by: Zainun Ali

Personal details
- Born: Zambry bin Abdul Kadir; 22 March 1962 (age 64) Pangkor Island, Perak, Federation of Malaya
- Citizenship: Malaysia
- Party: United Malays National Organisation (UMNO)
- Other political affiliations: Barisan Nasional (BN)
- Spouse: Saripah Zulkifli
- Children: 5
- Education: International Islamic University Malaysia (AB & MA); Temple University (MA & PhD)
- Occupation: Politician
- Website: zambry.my www.facebook.com/zambryabdkadir

Zambry bin Abd Kadir (Jawi: زمبري بن عبدالقادر, born 22 March 1962) is a Malaysian politician. Since December 2023, he has served as the Minister of Higher Education in the Unity Government administration under Prime Minister Anwar Ibrahim.

Zambry previously served as the Minister of Foreign Affairs from the years of December 2022 to December 2023, before the 2023 cabinet reshuffle. From August 2020 to December 2022 he was the non-independent, non-executive chairman of Malaysia Airports Holdings Berhad (MAHB). Zambry also briefly served as the Leader of the Opposition of Perak from July 2018 to August 2018 and was the 11th Menteri Besar of Perak from February 2009 to May 2018. He was a member of the Perak State Executive Council (EXCO) in the Barisan Nasional (BN) state administration under former Menteri Besar Tajol Rosli Mohd Ghazali from March 2004 until the collapse of the BN state administration in March 2008. He also served as a member of the Perak State Legislative Assembly for Pangkor from March 2004 to November 2022. Zambry is a Supreme Council Member of the United Malays National Organisation (UMNO) and the Division Chief for Lumut. He also served as the Secretary-General of BN since June 2021.

== Education ==
Zambry obtained his early education on Pangkor Island and attended secondary school in Sitiawan (SMK Sitiawan) before continuing his upper secondary education at Sekolah Menengah Kebangsaan Panglima Bukit Gantang, Parit Buntar, Perak.

He holds a PhD in Political Thoughts with distinction from Temple University in Philadelphia, Pennsylvania, United States (1995), after completing his master's degree in Political Philosophy and Comparative Religion from the same university in 1993.

Zambry also holds another master's degree, in Islamic Thoughts, from the International Islamic University Malaysia, which he received in 1991 after completing his first degree, a B.Econ (Hon) in Economics from the same institution.

Year	Institutions	Fields
1987	International Islamic University Malaysia	B.Econ (Hons)
1991	International Islamic University Malaysia	M.A (Islamic Thought)
1992	Temple University, United States	M.A (Political Philosophy and Comparative Religion)
1995	Temple University, United States	PhD (Political Thought) (Distinction)

== Political career ==
Zambry entered politics in 1995 after returning from the United States. He began his political career as the Pangkor UMNO Branch Chief before being elected as the Lumut UMNO Youth Division Chief. He later served as a State UMNO Youth Chief and became an executive council member of the National UMNO Youth.

In the 2004 Malaysian general election, he was elected as the Perak State Legislative Assembly member for Pangkor and retained the seat in the 2008 and 2013 general elections.

Zambry was the head of Perak UMNO until he was succeeded by Saarani Mohamad. He continues to hold the Lumut UMNO Division Chief position.

In 1998, he was detained under the Internal Security Act (ISA).

=== Perak Constitutional Crisis ===
A member of the Perak state legislative assembly, Zambry was a figure in the 2009 Perak constitutional crisis as the intended Menteri Besar. After three state assembly persons from the Pakatan Rakyat coalition announced their intention to support a candidate for Menteri Besar, they lent their support to a vote of no confidence in the incumbent Pakatan Rakyat Menteri Besar Mohammad Nizar Jamaluddin. Sultan Azlan Shah of Perak requested Nizar's resignation and swore in Zambry as the new Menteri Besar on February 6, 2009, in which Zambry held for about three months. However, Nizar maintained that the Sultan was not permitted by the state constitution to dismiss him as the Menteri Besar. On May 11, 2009, the Kuala Lumpur High Court ruled that Nizar had always been the rightful Menteri Besar of Perak. To maintain administrative continuity, Nizar tentatively endorsed most of Zambry's policies, subject to later review, but reinstated the 817 village development and security committees and 318 local government councillors whom Zambry had sacked. However, the following day, the Court of Appeal granted a conservation of the High Court judgement, and Zambry returned to the post.

On May 22, 2009, the Court of Appeal unanimously declared Zambry as the rightful Menteri Besar of Perak. The court ruled that the High Court's earlier decision on declaring Nizar as the legitimate Menteri Besar was erroneous and accordingly set it aside. Delivering oral judgement, Justice Md. Raus held that the Sultan of Perak, Sultan Azlan Shah, was correct in appointing Zambry as the new Menteri Besar under Article 16(2) of the Perak Constitution, after being satisfied that Zambry had the command of the majority of the state legislative assembly.

== Writings ==
Among the books he has written are 'UMNO dan Jiwa Merdeka (CELDES KL 1998),' 'Pemuda UMNO Menebus Maruah,' 'Menuju Arah (May 2000),' and 'Islam Malaysia & Amerika.' His poems are compiled in an anthology in a book titled 'Suara Pelaut (The Voice of a Seaman).'

Zambry has edited publications on education and development for Nurin Enterprise, K.L (1980) and served as editor of Business Administration in Islam, Hizbi (1991). He also edited Memperkasa Kepimpinan Merentas Masa Depan, CELDES, KL (1991). He was the Editorial Chief for Imbas Gemilang KBS 1998, a publication for the Ministry of Youth and Sports.

Among his translation works are Faces of Islam (Berita Publishing, 1990), Qur'anic Sciences (Dewan Bahasa dan Pustaka, 1991) and Islamic Legal Philosophy (Dewan Bahasa dan Pustaka, Oktober, 2000).

== Awards and recognitions ==
In 2014, Zambry received a special recognition at the Global Islamic Finance Awards held in Dubai, United Arab Emirates. The award acknowledged his role in establishing the Yayasan Bina Upaya Darul Ridzuan, a state foundation aimed at addressing poverty-related issues in Perak.

He was also awarded the Honorary Doctorate of Business Administration from the University of East London for his contributions to the State of Perak.

== Election results ==
Perak State Legislative Assembly
Year	Constituency	Candidate	Votes	Pct	Opponent(s)	Votes	Pct	Ballots cast	Majority	Turnout
2004	N52 Pangkor	Zambry Abd Kadir (UMNO)	8,349	50.00%	Suwardi Sapuan (PKR)	2,680	16.04%	16,712	5,669	80.15%
2004	N52 Pangkor	Zambry Abd Kadir (UMNO)	8,349	50.00%	Mohd Ishak Mohd Som (IND)	117	0.70%	16,712	5,669	80.15%
2008	N52 Pangkor	Zambry Abd Kadir (UMNO)	10,906	57.11%	Pkhrazi @ Pakhrazi Musa (PKR)	5,121	26.82%	19,097	5,785	84.60%
2013	N52 Pangkor	Zambry Abd Kadir (UMNO)	12,291	61.95%	Mohd Saifullah Mohd Zulkifli (PKR)	7,167	36.12%	19,840	5,124	83.30%
2013	N52 Pangkor	Zambry Abd Kadir (UMNO)	12,291	61.95%	Bernard Parenpa (IND)	51	0.26%	19,840	5,124	83.30%
2018	N52 Pangkor	Zambry Abd Kadir (UMNO)	8,378	44.28%	Nordin Ahmad Ismail (BERSATU)	6,752	27.30%	19,547	1,219	78.97%
2018	N52 Pangkor	Zambry Abd Kadir (UMNO)	8,378	44.28%	Zainal Abidin Saad Ibrahim (PAS)	3,638	14.70%	19,547	1,219	78.97%

Parliament of Malaysia
Year	Constituency	Candidate	Votes	Pct	Opponent(s)	Votes	Pct	Ballots cast	Majority	Turnout
2018	P074 Lumut	Zambry Abd Kadir (UMNO)	21,555	40.18%	Mohd Hatta Ramli (AMANAH)	21,955	40.93%	53,645	400	81.96%
2018	P074 Lumut	Zambry Abd Kadir (UMNO)	21,555	40.18%	Mohammed Zamri Ibrahim (PAS)	10,135	18.89%	53,645	400	81.96%
2022	P074 Lumut	Zambry Abd Kadir (UMNO)	24,849	34.92%	Nordin Ahmad Ismail (BERSATU)	25,212	35.43%	71,162	363	76.54%
2022	P074 Lumut	Zambry Abd Kadir (UMNO)	24,849	34.92%	Mohd Hatta Ramli (AMANAH)	20,358	28.61%	71,162	363	76.54%
2022	P074 Lumut	Zambry Abd Kadir (UMNO)	24,849	34.92%	Mohd Isnin Ismail (WARISAN)	385	0.54%	71,162	363	76.54%
2022	P074 Lumut	Zambry Abd Kadir (UMNO)	24,849	34.92%	Mazlan Abdul Ghani (PEJUANG)	358	0.50%	71,162	363	76.54%

== Honours ==
=== Honours of Malaysia ===
- Malaysia
  - Recipient of the General Service Medal (PPA)
  - Recipient of the 14th Yang di-Pertuan Agong Installation Medal
  - Recipient of the 15th Yang di-Pertuan Agong Installation Medal
  - Recipient of the 17th Yang di-Pertuan Agong Installation Medal
- Malaysian Armed Forces
  - Warrior of the Most Gallant Order of Military Service (PAT) (2014)
- Malacca
  - Grand Commander of the Exalted Order of Malacca (DGSM) – Datuk Seri (2009)
- Perak
  - Ordinary Class of the Perak Family Order of Sultan Azlan Shah (SPSA) – Dato' Seri DiRaja (2011)
  - Knight Grand Commander of the Order of the Perak State Crown (SPMP) – Dato' Seri (2009)
  - Knight Commander of the Order of the Perak State Crown (DPMP) – Dato' (2002)
  - Recipient of the Sultan Azlan Shah Silver Jubilee Medal (2009)
  - Recipient of the Sultan Nazrin Shah Installation Medal (6 May 2015)
- Selangor
  - Member of the Order of the Crown of Selangor (AMS)

=== Foreign honours ===
- Monaco
  - Commander of the Order of Saint-Charles (27 November 2023)

== Personal life ==
Zambry was born on March 22, 1962, in Pangkor Island, a tourist fishing settlement island in Perak, Malaysia.

He is married to Saripah Zulkifli and has five children.

Political offices
Preceded by Mohammad Nizar Jamaluddin	11th Menteri Besar of Perak; 2009 - 2018	Succeeded by Ahmad Faizal Azumu
