= Richard Ho =

Malaysian politician

Yang Berbahagia Dato' Richard Ho Ung Hun DPMP
- 何文翰

Member of the Malaysian Parliament for Lumut
- In office 1974–1982
- Preceded by: Constituency established.
- Succeeded by: Ng Cheng Kuai (BN–MCA)
- Majority: 1,010 (1974); 5,625 (1978)

Member of the Malaysian Parliament for Sitiawan
- In office 1969 – 1974 (1969-1971:Parliament was suspended)
- Preceded by: Kam Woon Wah (Alliance–MCA)
- Succeeded by: Constituency abolished.
- Majority: 3,643 (1969)

Personal details
- Born: Ho Ung Hun; 20 January 1927 Sitiawan, Perak, British Malaya (now Malaysia)
- Died: 4 February 2008 (aged 81)
- Citizenship: Malaysian
- Party: Malaysian Chinese Association (MCA) (1972-2008); Democratic Action Party (DAP) (until 1972)
- Spouse: Datin Mary Heng
- Children: Ignatius Ho and Cecelia Ho
- Education: Lincoln's Inn
- Occupation: Politician
- Profession: Barrister, banker

Chinese name
- Traditional Chinese: 何文翰
Transcriptions
Standard Mandarin
- Hanyu Pinyin: Hé Wénhàn

Richard Ho Ung Hun (Chinese: 何文翰; pinyin: Hé Wénhàn; 20 January 1927 – 4 February 2008) was a Malaysian civil servant. In the course of his career, he served as a barrister, member of parliament (MP), cabinet minister, chairman of Maybank Finance and deputy chairman of Malayan Banking, and as a director of several publicly listed companies in Malaysia.

== Early life and legal career ==
Ho was born in Sitiawan, Perak. His father was a preacher. He began his career as a teacher. He later joined the public service under the colonial British government as a court interpreter.

After resigning as an Assistant District Officer in Malacca in his early 30s, Ho left for the United Kingdom where he pursued his law degree, being called as a barrister of the Lincoln's Inn in England in 1961, at the age of 34. The same year Ho was called to the High Court of Malaya as an advocate and solicitor.

== Political career ==
In 1969, in what was considered a feat, Ho, then 42, stood as a "favourite son of Sitiawan" under the opposition Democratic Action Party (DAP) ticket and successfully wrested the ruling Alliance coalition's blue ribbon Sitiawan parliamentary seat from Kam Woon Wah, the secretary-general of the then powerful Malaysian Chinese Association (MCA), a senior partner of the governing Alliance (later became National Front or Barisan Nasional in 1973) coalition.

Later Ho together with another DAP's MP Walter Loh Poh Khan of Setapak, had crossed over to MCA on 18 May 1972.

Ho successfully retained the formerly Sitiawan which was renamed as Lumut seat where the Royal Malaysian Navy base is located in the 1974) and 1978 general elections for the ruling National Front coalition as he moved up the political ladder from the age of 47 as Deputy Minister of Works and Transport in 1974, Deputy Minister of Finance in 1976, Minister in the Prime Minister's Department 1977 to 1978 and Minister of Labour and Manpower 1978 to 1982.

Ho was dropped in 1982 general election as the ruling coalition's candidate in an intra-MCA intrigue involving powerful forces who finally removed MCA president Dato’ (as he then was, later Tan Sri) Lee San Choon, also a Cabinet Minister.

This was despite Ho, who had earlier married at the age of 55, having steadily moved up the MCA ladder till becoming the MCA deputy president to Lee by then. Dato’ Lee, believing his ambitious aides that Ho's active traversing the country meant he was eyeing his top job, was used by them who actually eyed Tan Sri Lee's job.

According to his confidante and close friend of more than 40 years standing, newspaper editor-turned-New Zealand-trained lawyer Tan Ban Cheng of Penang, “Dato’ Ho never wanted to be MCA president. He moved into his position as deputy by the force of circumstance and had always supported Tan Sri Lee.”

An insider noted that it was Ho's resignation as MCA deputy president the very day after Nomination Day for the 1982 general election that triggered the fight between the academician and incumbent Cabinet Minister Dato’ Neo Yee Pan and businessman Tan Koon Swan factions.

Unable to resolve the claims of the contending ambitions of the Tan and Neo factions, Tan Sri Lee resigned in 1983, sending the MCA into an almost three-year-long crisis that culminated in the eventual rise of Dr (now Tun Dato Seri Dr) Ling Liong Sik over the ambitious Datuk Neo and architect and incumbent Cabinet Minister Datuk Mak Hon Kam both of whom fell out as the crisis widened.

== Post political career ==
In late 1982, already out of the political arena, Ho was appointed concurrently as the vice-chairman of the Maybank board and chairman of its finance subsidiary.

Ho's confidante, Mr. Tan, described Ho as "a man of many parts, always humble, approachable, helpful and caring." Ho, said Penang-based Tan, showed his talents as a linguist, politician, public administrator and banker – “his last role as banker acquired at the age of 56 needed a steep learning curve.”

== Personal life ==
Ho married Datin Mary Heng when he was 55. The couple had two children, Ignatius and Cecelia. He died at the age of 81, on February 4, 2008.

== Election results ==
Parliament of Malaysia
Year	Constituency	Candidate	Votes	Pct	Opponent(s)	Votes	Pct	Ballots cast	Majority	Turnout
1969	P045 Sitiawan	Richard Ho Ung Hun (DAP)	11,607	59.31%	Kam Woon Wah (MCA)	7,964	40.69%	20,492	3,643	73.37%
1974	P060 Lumut	Richard Ho Ung Hun (MCA)	8,792	45.60%	Ting Siek Ho (DAP)	7,782	40.36%	20,189	1,010	68.99%
1974	P060 Lumut	Richard Ho Ung Hun (MCA)	8,792	45.60%	Wong Ting Seng (IND)	2,707	14.04%	20,189	1,010	68.99%
1978	P060 Lumut	Richard Ho Ung Hun (MCA)	15,021	58.63%	Ting Siek Ho (DAP)	9,396	36.68%	26,238	5,625	77.94%
1978	P060 Lumut	Richard Ho Ung Hun (MCA)	15,021	58.63%	Abd Manan Md Bakri (PAS)	1,201	4.69%	26,238	5,625	77.94%

== Honours ==
- Perak
  - Knight Commander of the Order of the Perak State Crown (DPMP) – Dato' (1978)

== See also ==
- Sitiawan (federal constituency)
- Lumut (federal constituency)
