= Mohd Hatta Ramli =

Malaysian politician and physician

Yang Berhormat Senator Datuk Wira Mohd Hatta Md Ramli DCSM
- محمد حتّى مد رملي

Deputy Minister of Entrepreneur Development
- In office 2 July 2018 – 24 February 2020
- Monarchs: Muhammad V (2018–2019); Abdullah (2019–2020)
- Prime Minister: Mahathir Mohamad
- Minister: Mohd Redzuan Md Yusof
- Preceded by: Henry Sum Agong (Deputy Minister of Domestic Trade, Co-operatives and Consumerism)
- Succeeded by: Mas Ermieyati Samsudin (Deputy Minister of Entrepreneur Development and Cooperative)
- Constituency: Lumut

Senator Appointed by the Yang di-Pertuan Agong
- Incumbent
- Assumed office 20 March 2023
- Monarchs: Abdullah (2023–2024); Ibrahim Iskandar (since 2024)
- Prime Minister: Anwar Ibrahim

Member of the Malaysian Parliament for Lumut
- In office 9 May 2018 – 19 November 2022
- Preceded by: Mohamad Imran Abdul Hamid (PH–PKR)
- Succeeded by: Nordin Ahmad Ismail (PN–BERSATU)
- Majority: 400 (2018)

Member of the Malaysian Parliament for Kuala Krai
- In office 8 March 2008 – 9 May 2018
- Preceded by: Mohd Razali Che Mamat (BN–UMNO)
- Succeeded by: Abdul Latiff Abdul Rahman (PAS)
- Majority: 4,984 (2008); 2,043 (2013)

Vice President of the National Trust Party
- Incumbent
- Assumed office 7 January 2024 Serving with Dzulkefly Ahmad & Siti Mariah Mahmud & Adly Zahari & Mahfuz Omar
- President: Mohamad Sabu
- Preceded by: Mujahid Yusof Rawa & Hasanuddin Mohd Yunus

2nd Secretary General of the National Trust Party
- In office 11 December 2019 – 24 December 2023
- President: Mohamad Sabu
- Preceded by: Mohd Anuar Mohd Tahir
- Succeeded by: Muhammad Faiz Fadzil

Faction represented in the Dewan Negara
- 2023-: Pakatan Harapan

Faction represented in the Dewan Rakyat
- 2008–2015: Malaysian Islamic Party
- 2015–2018: National Trust Party
- 2018–2022: Pakatan Harapan

Personal details
- Born: Mohd Hatta bin Md Ramli; 11 September 1956 (age 70) Sitiawan, Perak, Federation of Malaya (now Malaysia)
- Citizenship: Malaysian
- Party: Malaysian Islamic Party (PAS) (–2015); National Trust Party (AMANAH) (since 2015)
- Other political affiliations: Barisan Alternatif (BA) (1999–2004); Pakatan Rakyat (PR) (2008–2015); Pakatan Harapan (PH) (since 2015)
- Spouse: Kalsom Maskon
- Children: 7
- Education: Universiti Kebangsaan Malaysia (MD)
- Occupation: Politician
- Profession: Physician
- Website: hattaramli.blogspot.com
- Mohd Hatta Ramli on Facebook; Mohd Hatta Ramli on Parliament of Malaysia

Mohd Hatta bin Md. Ramli (Jawi: محمد حتّى بن مد رملي; born 11 September 1956) is a Malaysian politician and physician who has served as a Senator since March 2023. He served as the Deputy Minister of Entrepreneur Development in the Pakatan Harapan (PH) administration under former Prime Minister Mahathir Mohamad and former Minister Mohd Redzuan Md Yusof from July 2018 to the collapse of the PH administration in February 2020. and the Member of Parliament (MP) for Lumut from May 2018 to November 2022 and for Kuala Krai from March 2008 to May 2018. He is a member of the National Trust Party (AMANAH), a component party of PH coalition and was a member, Treasurer, Elections Director and Central Committee Member of the Malaysian Islamic Party (PAS), a former component party of the former Pakatan Rakyat (PR) coalition. He has served as the Vice President of AMANAH since January 2024 and the 2nd Secretary General of AMANAH from December 2019 to his promotion to the vice presidency in January 2024. He was a member of the Gerakan Harapan Baru (GHB), the group of PAS progressive Islamists leaders who have lost in the 2015 PAS party election, they later founded a new party, namely AMANAH.

== Early life and education ==
Mohd Hatta Ramli was born on 11 September 1956 in Sitiawan, Perak, Federation of Malaya. His father is Haji Mohd. Ramli Haji Mustapa died in 1995 and his mother Arga'ayah Md. Rawi. He has 7 siblings and is the 5th child. Mohd Hatta Ramli received his early education at the Anglo Chinese School in Sitiawan, Perak from 1963 to 1971. Then, he continued his studies at the Malay College Kuala Kangsar from 1972 to 1975.

Then, he continued his studies in Matriculation in Sabah from 1975 to 1976. He later continued his studies in the field of Medicine at the Universiti Kebangsaan Malaysia (UKM) from 1976 to 1982 with honors in the field of Obstetrics and Gynecology. He then obtained a Master's degree in Public Health from 1987 to 1988 at the National University of Singapore.

== Political career ==
Mohd Hatta Ramli has known PAS since he was a child when his late father was a PAS activist in the Ranting area, Sitiawan, Perak. He became involved in PAS in 1982 and became a member in 1983 in the Setapak area.

Mohd Hatta Ramli contested on 1999 general election in Gombak seat, he was defeated with majority of 803 votes. He contested again in Gombak seat on 2004 general election, but was defeated with majority of 13,207 votes. He was elected on 2008 general election and 2013 general election as MP for Kuala Krai. In 2015, he with other progressive party member of PAS form the AMANAH party.

In 2018 general election, he switched to Lumut seat, a constituency full of Navy personnel voters. He was successfully elected as MP for Lumut by defeating Menteri Besar Zambry Abdul Kadir with majority of 400 votes. In 2 July 2018, he was appointed as Deputy Minister of Entrepreneur Development by Prime Minister Mahathir Mohamad.

== Election results ==
Parliament of Malaysia
| Year | Constituency | Candidate | Votes | Pct | Opponent(s) | Votes | Pct | Ballots cast | Majority | Turnout |
|---|---|---|---|---|---|---|---|---|---|---|
| 1999 | P091 Gombak | Mohd Hatta Ramli (PAS) | 27,310 | 49.28% | Zaleha Ismail (UMNO) | 28,113 | 50.72% | 56,074 | 803 | 75.83% |
| 2004 | P098 Gombak | Mohd Hatta Ramli (PAS) | 26,663 | 40.07% | Raman Ismail (UMNO) | 39,870 | 59.93% | 67,358 | 13,207 | 73.04% |
| 2008 | P031 Kuala Krai | Mohd Hatta Ramli (PAS) | 23,562 | 55.91% | Che Musa Che Omar (UMNO) | 18,578 | 44.09% | 43,013 | 4,984 | 82.32% |
| 2013 | P031 Kuala Krai | Mohd Hatta Ramli (PAS) | 27,919 | 51.09% | Tuan Aziz Tuan Hamat (UMNO) | 25,876 | 47.36% | 54,643 | 2,043 | 86.60% |
| 2018 | P074 Lumut | Mohd Hatta Ramli (AMANAH) | 21,955 | 40.93% | Zambry Abdul Kadir (UMNO) | 21,555 | 40.18% | 53,645 | 400 | 81.96% |
| 2018 | P074 Lumut | Mohd Hatta Ramli (AMANAH) | 21,955 | 40.93% | Mohammed Zamri Ibrahim (PAS) | 10,135 | 18.89% | 53,645 | 400 | 81.96% |
| 2022 | P074 Lumut | Mohd Hatta Ramli (AMANAH) | 20,358 | 28.61% | Nordin Ahmad Ismail (BERSATU) | 25,212 | 35.43% | 71,162 | 363 | 76.54% |
| 2022 | P074 Lumut | Mohd Hatta Ramli (AMANAH) | 20,358 | 28.61% | Zambry Abdul Kadir (UMNO) | 24,849 | 34.92% | 71,162 | 363 | 76.54% |
| 2022 | P074 Lumut | Mohd Hatta Ramli (AMANAH) | 20,358 | 28.61% | Mazlan Abdul Ghani (PEJUANG) | 385 | 0.54% | 71,162 | 363 | 76.54% |
| 2022 | P074 Lumut | Mohd Hatta Ramli (AMANAH) | 20,358 | 28.61% | Mohd Isnin Ismail (WARISAN) | 358 | 0.50% | 71,162 | 363 | 76.54% |

Selangor State Legislative Assembly
| Year | Constituency | Candidate | Votes | Pct | Opponent(s) | Votes | Pct | Ballots cast | Majority | Turnout |
|---|---|---|---|---|---|---|---|---|---|---|
| 2004 | N15 Taman Templer | Mohd Hatta Ramli (PAS) | 8,911 | 35.02% | Ahmad Bhari Abd Rahman (UMNO) | 16,536 | 64.98% | 26,416 | 7,625 | 74.56% |

== Honours ==
- Malaysia
  - Recipient of the 17th Yang di-Pertuan Agong Installation Medal (2024)
- Malacca
  - Knight Commander of the Exalted Order of Malacca (DCSM) – Datuk Wira (2018)
