= Abdul Latiff Abdul Rahman =

Malaysian politician

Yang Berhormat Tuan Abdul Latiff Abdul Rahman JMN JMK MP
- عَبْدُٱلْلَطِيف عَبْدُٱلرَّحْمَٰن

Member of the Malaysian Parliament for Kuala Krai
- Incumbent
- Assumed office 9 May 2018
- Preceded by: Mohd Hatta Ramli (PR–PAS)
- Majority: 7,992 (2018); 25,188 (2022)

Member of the Kelantan State Legislative Assembly for Mengkebang
- In office 8 March 2008 – 9 May 2018
- Preceded by: Azizzuddin Hussein (BN–UMNO)
- Succeeded by: Muhammad Mat Sulaiman (PAS)
- Majority: 1,903 (2008); 1,072 (2013)

Faction represented in Dewan Rakyat
- 2018–2020: Malaysian Islamic Party
- 2020–: Perikatan Nasional

Faction represented in the Kelantan State Legislative Assembly
- 2008–2018: Malaysian Islamic Party

Other Roles
- 2013–2018: Deputy Speaker of the Kelantan State Legislative Assembly
- 2021–: Chairman of the Special Select Committee on Agencies under the Prime Minister's Department

Personal details
- Born: Abdul Latiff bin Abdul Rahman; 7 July 1971 (age 55) Kelantan, Malaysia
- Citizenship: Malaysian
- Party: Malaysian Islamic Party (PAS)
- Other political affiliations: Perikatan Nasional (PN)
- Education: Al Al-Bayt University
- Occupation: Politician

Abdul Latiff bin Abdul Rahman is a Malaysian politician who has served as the Member of Parliament (MP) for Kuala Krai since May 2018. He previously served as Member of the Kelantan State Legislative Assembly (MLA) for Mengkebang from March 2008 to May 2018. He is a member and the Division Chief of Kuala Krai of the Malaysian Islamic Party (PAS), a component party of the Perikatan Nasional (PN) coalition. As MP for Kuala Krai, he supported the cancellation of concerts in Malaysia and called a Bollywood concert insensitive.

== Election results ==
Parliament of Malaysia
Year	Constituency	Candidate	Votes	Pct	Opponent(s)	Votes	Pct	Ballots cast	Majority	Turnout
2018	P031 Kuala Krai	Abdul Latiff Abdul Rahman (PAS)	28,903	52.56%	Ramzi Ab Rahman (UMNO)	20,911	38.03%	56,278	7,992	80.00%
2018	P031 Kuala Krai	Abdul Latiff Abdul Rahman (PAS)	28,903	52.56%	Mohd Yazid Abdullah (AMANAH)	5,173	9.41%	56,278	7,992	80.00%
2022	P031 Kuala Krai	Abdul Latiff Abdul Rahman (PAS)	42,740	66.08%	Mohd Zulkepli Omar (UMNO)	17,552	27.14%	65,684	25,188	70.05%
2022	P031 Kuala Krai	Abdul Latiff Abdul Rahman (PAS)	42,740	66.08%	Mohamad Hisyamuddin Ghazali (AMANAH)	4,148	6.41%	65,684	25,188	70.05%
2022	P031 Kuala Krai	Abdul Latiff Abdul Rahman (PAS)	42,740	66.08%	Norashikin Che Umar (PEJUANG)	241	0.37%	65,684	25,188	70.05%

Kelantan State Legislative Assembly
Year	Constituency	Candidate	Votes	Pct	Opponent(s)	Votes	Pct	Ballots cast	Majority	Turnout
2004	N39 Mengkebang	Abdul Latiff Abdul Rahman (PAS)	4,999	48.47%	Azizzuddin Hussein (UMNO)	5,315	51.53%	10,457	316	83.22%
2008	N39 Mengkebang	Abdul Latiff Abdul Rahman (PAS)	7,007	57.86%	Azizzuddin Hussein (UMNO)	5,104	42.14%	12,315	1,903	85.39%
2013	N39 Mengkebang	Abdul Latiff Abdul Rahman (PAS)	8,235	53.48%	Azizzuddin Hussein (UMNO)	7,163	46.52%	15,652	1,072	88.60%

== Honours ==
=== Honours of Malaysia ===
- Malaysia
  - Companion of the Order of the Defender of the Realm (JMN) (2021)
  - Recipient of the 17th Yang di-Pertuan Agong Installation Medal (2024)
- Kelantan
  - Companion of the Order of the Life of the Crown of Kelantan (JMK) (2022)
