= Sitiawan (federal constituency) =

Perak constituency

Defunct federal constituency
- Legislature: Dewan Rakyat
- Constituency created: 1958
- Constituency abolished: 1974
- First contested: 1959
- Last contested: 1969

Sitiawan was a federal constituency in Perak, Malaysia, that was represented in the Dewan Rakyat from 1959 to 1974.

The federal constituency was created in the 1974 redistribution and was mandated to return a single member to the Dewan Rakyat under the first past the post voting system.

== History ==
It was abolished in 1974 when it was redistributed.

=== Representation history ===
Members of Parliament for Sitiawan
Parliament	No	Years	Member	Party	Vote Share
Constituency created from Dindings
Parliament of the Federation of Malaya
1st	P045	1959-1963	Yong Woo Ming (杨武明)	Alliance (MCA)	6,442; 41.67%
Parliament of Malaysia
1st	P045	1963-1964	Yong Woo Ming (杨武明)	Alliance (MCA)	6,442; 41.67%
2nd	P045	1964-1969	Kam Woon Wah (甘文华)	Alliance (MCA)	11,136; 60.41%
		1969-1971	Parliament was suspended		
3rd	P045	1971-1972	Richard Ho Ung Hun (何文翰)	DAP	11,607; 59.31%
3rd	P045	1972-1973	Richard Ho Ung Hun (何文翰)	Alliance (MCA)	11,607; 59.31%
3rd	P045	1973-1974	Richard Ho Ung Hun (何文翰)	BN (MCA)	11,607; 59.31%
Constituency abolished, renamed to Lumut

=== State constituency ===
Parliamentary constituency	State constituency						
Parliamentary constituency	1955–59*	1959–1974	1974–1986	1986–1995	1995–2004	2004–2018	2018–present
Sitiawan		Lekir					
Sitiawan		Lumut					

=== Historical boundaries ===
State Constituency	Area
State Constituency	1959
Lekir	Batu Undan; Damar Laut; Lekir; Segari; Sitiawan
Lumut	Kampung Koh; Lumut; Pangkor; Pasir Panjang; Seri Manjung

== Election results ==
Malaysian general election, 1969
Party	Candidate	Votes	%	∆%
DAP	Richard Ho Ung Hun	11,607	59.31	▲59.31
Alliance	Kam Woon Wah	7,964	40.69	▼19.72
Total valid votes		19,571	100.00	
Total rejected ballots		921		
Unreturned ballots		0		
Turnout		20,492	73.37	▲6.71
Registered electors		27,930		
Majority		3,643	18.62	▼2.20
DAP gain from Alliance		Swing		?

Malaysian general election, 1964
Party	Candidate	Votes	%	∆%
Alliance	Kam Woon Wah	11,136	60.41	▲18.74
UDP	Too Joon Hing	7,299	39.59	▲39.59
Total valid votes		18,435	100.00	
Total rejected ballots		685		
Unreturned ballots		0		
Turnout		19,120	80.08	▲18.93
Registered electors		23,877		
Majority		3,837	20.82	▲18.48
Alliance hold		Swing		

Malayan general election, 1959
Party	Candidate	Votes	%
Alliance	Yong Woo Ming	6,442	41.67
Independent	Too Joon Hing	6,079	39.33
PPP	Hor Hock Lung	2,937	19.00
Total valid votes		15,458	100.00
Total rejected ballots		155	
Unreturned ballots		0	
Turnout		15,613	61.15
Registered electors		25,531	
Majority		373	2.34
This was a new constituency created.
