= Kong Cho Ha =

Malaysian politician (born 1950)

Yang Berbahagia Tan Sri Dato' Seri Kong Cho Ha PSM SSAP SPMP DPMP PMP AMN AMP PPN
- 江作汉
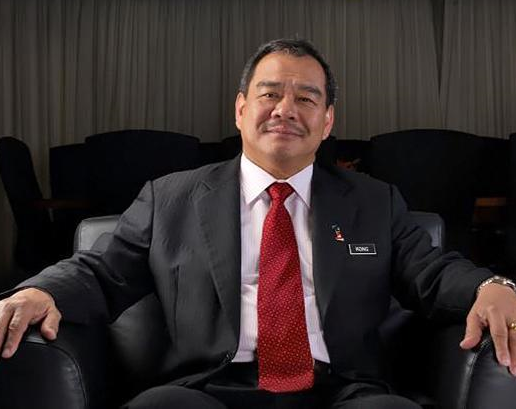

Minister of Transport
- In office 4 June 2010 – 15 May 2013
- Monarchs: Mizan Zainal Abidin; Abdul Halim
- Prime Minister: Najib Razak
- Deputy: Abdul Rahim Bakri; Jelaing Mersat
- Preceded by: Ong Tee Keat
- Succeeded by: Hishammuddin Hussein (Acting)
- Constituency: Lumut

Minister of Housing and Local Government
- In office 10 April 2009 – 4 June 2010
- Monarch: Mizan Zainal Abidin
- Prime Minister: Najib Razak
- Deputy: Lajim Ukin
- Preceded by: Ong Ka Chuan
- Succeeded by: Chor Chee Heung
- Constituency: Lumut

Deputy Minister of Finance II
- In office 19 March 2008 – 9 April 2009 Serving with Ahmad Husni Hanadzlah
- Monarch: Mizan Zainal Abidin
- Prime Minister: Abdullah Ahmad Badawi
- Minister: Abdullah Ahmad Badawi (2008); Nor Mohamed Yakcop; Najib Razak (2008–2009)
- Preceded by: Ng Yen Yen
- Succeeded by: Chor Chee Heung
- Constituency: Lumut

Deputy Minister of Science, Technology and Innovation
- In office 27 March 2004 – 18 March 2008
- Monarchs: Sirajuddin; Mizan Zainal Abidin
- Prime Minister: Abdullah Ahmad Badawi
- Minister: Jamaluddin Jarjis
- Preceded by: Zainal Dahlan as Deputy Minister of Science, Technology and Environment
- Succeeded by: Fadillah Yusof
- Constituency: Lumut

Secretary-General of the Malaysian Chinese Association
- In office 7 April 2010 – 2 January 2014
- President: Chua Soi Lek; Liow Tiong Lai
- Deputy: Hou Kok Chung
- Preceded by: Wong Foon Meng
- Succeeded by: Ong Ka Chuan
- Constituency: Lumut

Member of the Malaysian Parliament for Lumut
- In office 29 November 1999 – 5 May 2013
- Preceded by: Yap Yit Thong (BN–MCA)
- Succeeded by: Mohamad Imran Abdul Hamid (PR–PKR)
- Majority: 605 (1999); 11,614 (2004); 298 (2008)

Personal details
- Born: 15 September 1950 (age 75) Perak, Federation of Malaya (now Malaysia)
- Party: Malaysian Chinese Association (MCA)
- Other political affiliations: Barisan Nasional (BN); Perikatan Nasional (PN) (aligned:2020–2022)
- Occupation: Politician

Kong Cho Ha (simplified Chinese: 江作汉; traditional Chinese: 江作漢; pinyin: Jiāng Zuòhàn; Foochow Romanized: Gŏng Cáuk-háng; born 15 September 1950) is a Malaysian politician. He served as the Minister of Transport from 4 June 2010 to 5 May 2013. He was the Member of Parliament of Malaysia for the Lumut constituency in Perak from 29 November 1999 to 5 May 2013. He is a member of the Malaysian Chinese Association (MCA) and had served as its secretary-general from 7 April 2010 to 2 January 2014.

Kong became a deputy minister after the 2004 general elections. In April 2009, he replaced Ong Ka Chuan as Minister of Housing and Local Government. In June 2010, he moved to the Transport portfolio, replacing Ong Tee Keat.

During the MCA party Central Committee re-election in 2010, he partnered with Chua Soi Lek to contest for Deputy Presidency (Chua contested for presidency). However he was defeated by Liow Tiong Lai who was Ong Ka Ting's partner. He was later appointed by Dr Chua, the new president, as the party's Secretary-General. He was replaced by Ong Ka Chuan who was picked by Liow to become secretary-general again the second time on 2 January 2014.

== Election results ==
Perak State Legislative Assembly
Year	Constituency	Candidate	Votes	Pct	Opponent(s)	Votes	Pct	Ballots cast	Majority	Turnout
1990	N40 Sitiawan	Kong Cho Ha (MCA)	7,171	43.51%	Hoo Chan You (DAP)	9,309	56.49%	17,014	2,138	68.17%

Parliament of Malaysia
Year	Constituency	Candidate	Votes	Pct	Opponent(s)	Votes	Pct	Ballots cast	Majority	Turnout
1999	P074 Lumut	Kong Cho Ha (MCA)	20,661	50.74%	Zaman Huri Samsudin (keADILan)	20,056	49.26%	50,265	605	71.13%
2004	P074 Lumut	Kong Cho Ha (MCA)	31,824	63.44%	Mustaffa Kamil Ayub (PKR)	15,801	36.56%	50,179	11,614	73.23%
2008	P074 Lumut	Kong Cho Ha (MCA)	25,698	50.29%	Suwardi Sapuan (PKR)	25,400	49.71%	55,930	298	76.87%
2013	P074 Lumut	Kong Cho Ha (MCA)	32,140	44.36%	Mohamad Imran Abdul Hamid (PKR)	40,308	55.64%	73,753	8,168	83.53%

== Honours ==
=== Honours of Malaysia ===
- Malaysia
  - Commander of the Order of Loyalty to the Crown of Malaysia (PSM) – Tan Sri (2014)
  - Member of the Order of the Defender of the Realm (AMN) (2001)
  - Medal of the Order of the Defender of the Realm (PPN) (1996)
- Pahang
  - Knight Grand Companion of the Order of Sultan Ahmad Shah of Pahang (SSAP) – Dato' Sri (2011)
- Perak
  - Knight Grand Commander of the Order of the Perak State Crown (SPMP) – Dato' Seri (2009)
  - Knight Commander of the Order of the Perak State Crown (DPMP) – Dato' (2004)
  - Commander of the Order of the Perak State Crown (PMP) (2003)
  - Member of the Order of the Perak State Crown (AMP) (2001)
