= Nordin Ahmad Ismail =

Malaysian politician

Yang Berhormat Commander (Rtd) Nordin Ahmad Ismail KAT AMN AMS PPS PPA PNBB PJM MP
- نوردين أحمد أسماعيل

Member of the Malaysian Parliament for Lumut
- Incumbent
- Assumed office 19 November 2022
- Preceded by: Mohd Hatta Ramli (PH–AMANAH)
- Majority: 363 (2022)

Personal details
- Born: Nordin bin Ahmad Ismail; 3 September 1965 (age 60) Kuala Lumpur, Malaysia
- Occupation: Politician

Military service
- Branch/service: Royal Malaysian Navy
- Rank: Komander

Nordin bin Ahmad Ismail (born 3 September 1965) is a Malaysian politician and a retired Commander of the Royal Malaysian Navy who has served as the Member of Parliament (MP) for Lumut since November 2022. He is also a member of the Malaysian United Indigenous Party (BERSATU), a component party of the Perikatan Nasional (PN) coalition.

== Election results ==
Perak State Legislative Assembly
Year	Constituency	Candidate	Votes	Pct	Opponent(s)	Votes	Pct	Ballots cast	Majority	Turnout
2018	N52 Pangkor	Nordin Ahmad Ismail (BERSATU)	6,752	35.98%	Zambry Abdul Kadir (UMNO)	8,378	44.64%	19,547	1,626	78.96%
2018	N52 Pangkor	Nordin Ahmad Ismail (BERSATU)	6,752	35.98%	Zainal Abidin Saad (PAS)	3,638	19.38%	19,547	1,626	78.96%

Parliament of Malaysia
Year	Constituency	Candidate	Votes	Pct	Opponent(s)	Votes	Pct	Ballots cast	Majority	Turnout
2022	P074 Lumut	Nordin Ahmad Ismail (BERSATU)	25,212	35.43%	Zambry Abdul Kadir (UMNO)	24,849	34.92%	72,672	363	76.54%
2022	P074 Lumut	Nordin Ahmad Ismail (BERSATU)	25,212	35.43%	Mohd Hatta Ramli (AMANAH)	20,358	28.61%	72,672	363	76.54%
2022	P074 Lumut	Nordin Ahmad Ismail (BERSATU)	25,212	35.43%	Mazlan Abd Ghani (PEJUANG)	385	0.54%	72,672	363	76.54%
2022	P074 Lumut	Nordin Ahmad Ismail (BERSATU)	25,212	35.43%	Mohd Isnin Mohd Ismail (WARISAN)	358	0.50%	72,672	363	76.54%

== Honours ==
=== Honours of Malaysia ===
- Malaysia
  - Member of the Order of the Defender of the Realm (AMN) (2021)
  - Recipient of the Loyal Service Medal (PPS)
  - Recipient of the General Service Medal (PPA)
  - Recipient of the United Nations Missions Service Medal (PNBB) with "SUDAN" clasp
  - Recipient of the 17th Yang di-Pertuan Agong Installation Medal
- Malaysian Armed Forces
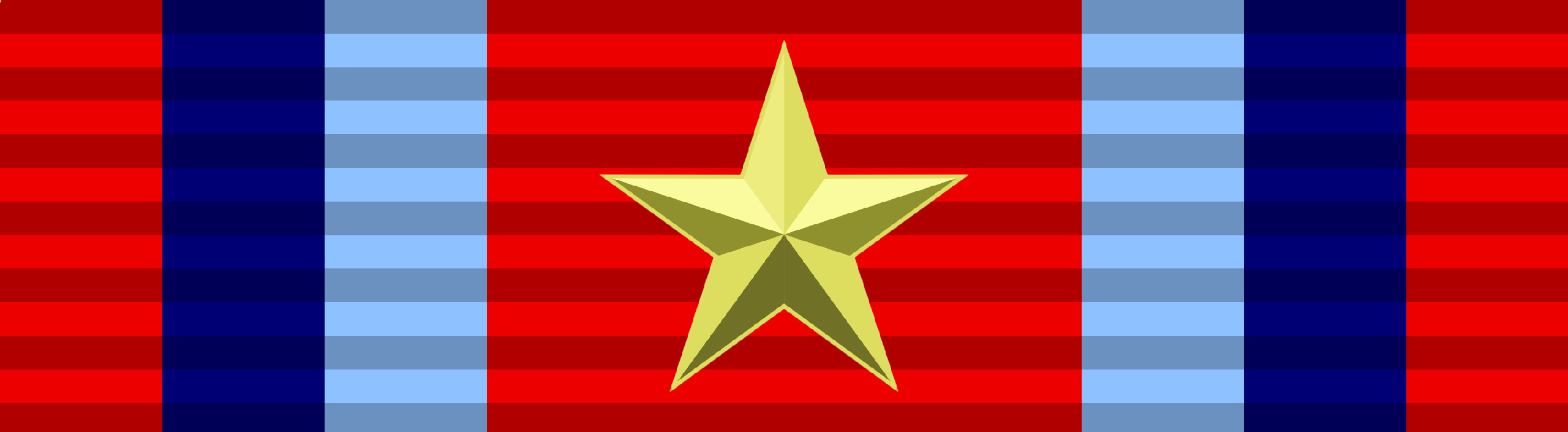
  - Officer of the Most Gallant Order of Military Service (KAT)
  - Recipient of the Malaysian Service Medal (PJM)
- Selangor
  - Member of the Order of the Crown of Selangor (AMS) (2009)
  - Recipient of the Sultan Salahuddin Silver Jubilee Medal (1985)
  - Recipient of the Sultan Sharafuddin Coronation Medal (2003)

=== Foreign honours ===
- United Nations
  - Recipient of the UNMIS Medal
