= Gombak (federal constituency) =

Federal constituency of Selangor, Malaysia

Gombak (P098)
Selangor constituency

Federal constituency
- Legislature: Dewan Rakyat
- MP: Amirudin Shari; PH
- Constituency created: 1994
- First contested: 1995
- Last contested: 2022

Demographics
- Population (2020): 349,207
- Electors (2023): 209,237
- Area (km²): 265
- Pop. density (per km²): 1,317.8

Gombak is a federal constituency in Gombak District, Selangor, Malaysia, that has been represented in the Dewan Rakyat since 1995.

The federal constituency was created from parts of the Selayang constituency in the 1994 redistribution and is mandated to return a single member to the Dewan Rakyat under the first past the post voting system.

== Demographics ==
Ethnic breakdown of Gombak's electorate as of 2018
1. Malay (77.7%)
2. Chinese (10.9%)
3. Indian (10.4%)
4. Other ethnicities (1.10%)
Age breakdown of Gombak's electorate as of 2022
1. 18-20 (6.65%)
2. 21-29 (21.8%)
3. 30-39 (23.0%)
4. 40-49 (17.5%)
5. 50-59 (13.9%)
6. 60-69 (11.0%)
7. 70-79 (4.93%)
8. 80-89 (1.06%)
9. above 90 (0.16%)
Gender breakdown of Gombak's electorate as of 2022
1. Male (49.6%)
2. Female (50.4%)

== History ==
=== Polling districts ===
According to the federal gazette issued on 31 October 2022, the Gombak constituency is divided into 47 polling districts.

State constituency	Polling districts	Code	Location
Sungai Tua (N16)	Wira Damai	098/16/01	SMK Sungai Kertas
Sungai Tua (N16)	Taman Jasa	098/16/02	SRA Kampung Sungai Tua Baru
Sungai Tua (N16)	Sungai Tua	098/16/03	SK Sungai Tua Baharu
Sungai Tua (N16)	Kampung Nakhoda	098/16/04	SA Rakyat (KAFA Integrasi) Al-Humaira
Sungai Tua (N16)	Kampung Laksamana	098/16/05	SK Sungai Kertas
Sungai Tua (N16)	Selayang Baharu Empat	098/16/06	SMK Selayang Bharu
Sungai Tua (N16)	Selayang Baharu Lima	098/16/07	SMK Darul Ehsan
Sungai Tua (N16)	Taman Selayang	098/16/08	SA Rakyat (Kafai) Al-Amaniah
Sungai Tua (N16)	Taman Batu Caves	098/16/09	SMK Taman Selayang
Sungai Tua (N16)	Pekan Batu Caves Lama	098/16/10	SJK (C) Kheow Bin
Sungai Tua (N16)	Batu Caves	098/16/11	SJK (T) Batu Caves
Sungai Tua (N16)	Batu 8 Sungai Tua	098/16/12	SK (2) Taman Selayang
Gombak Setia（N17）	Sri Gombak 9	098/17/01	Dewan Beringin, Taman Sri Gombak
Gombak Setia（N17）	Taman Greenwood	098/17/02	SMK Seri Gombak Taman Greenwood
Gombak Setia（N17）	Simpang Tiga	098/17/03	SK Sungai Pusu
Gombak Setia（N17）	Batu 8 Gombak	098/17/04	SK Gombak Utara
Gombak Setia（N17）	Gombak Selatan	098/17/05	SK Gombak Setia
Gombak Setia（N17）	Gombak Setia	098/17/06	SMK Gombak Setia
Gombak Setia（N17）	Sri Gombak 1	098/17/07	SK Taman Seri Gombak 2
Gombak Setia（N17）	Sri Gombak 2-7	098/17/08	Tapak Kawasan Komersial Fasa 3, Taman Seri Gombak
Gombak Setia（N17）	Taman Gombak	098/17/09	Dewan Majlis Perbandaran Selayang Taman Gombak
Gombak Setia（N17）	Batu 9 Gombak	098/17/10	Kolej Vokasional Gombak (SM Teknik Gombak)
Gombak Setia（N17）	Taman Kamariah	098/17/11	SK Gombak 1
Gombak Setia（N17）	Sri Gombak 10	098/17/12	SK Taman Seri Gombak
Gombak Setia（N17）	Sri Gombak 8	098/17/13	SK Taman Seri Gombak
Gombak Setia（N17）	Pinggiran Batu Caves	098/17/14	SA Rakyat (KAFA Integrasi) Al-Kahfi; Padang Taman Pinggiran Batu Caves
Gombak Setia（N17）	Taman Selaseh	098/17/15	SK Taman Selasih; SK Taman Samudra
Hulu Kelang（N18）	Bandar Melawati	098/18/01	SK Taman Melawati (2)
Hulu Kelang（N18）	Kelang Gate	098/18/02	SK Klang Gate
Hulu Kelang（N18）	Taman Melawati	098/18/03	SMK Taman Melawati
Hulu Kelang（N18）	Kemensah	098/18/04	Pejabat / Bilik Gerakan MPKK Kampung Kemensah
Hulu Kelang（N18）	Hulu Kelang	098/18/05	SK Hulu Kelang
Hulu Kelang（N18）	Taman Permata	098/18/06	SK Taman Permata
Hulu Kelang（N18）	Keramat Tengah AU 4	098/18/07	SA Rakyat (KAFA Integrasi) AU 4
Hulu Kelang（N18）	AU 3 Rumah Teres	098/18/08	SA Rakyat (KAFA Integrasi) Al-Khairiah AU3
Hulu Kelang（N18）	Sri Keramat AU 2a	098/18/09	SR Agama Integrasi Taman Keramat
Hulu Kelang（N18）	Keramat AU 1	098/18/10	SK (2) Taman Keramat
Hulu Kelang（N18）	Keramat Pangsa	098/18/11	Pusat Komuniti Rakyat Rumah Pangsa Taman Keramat AU2
Hulu Kelang（N18）	Melawati Jalan F.N.P.H.I.	098/18/12	SK Taman Melawati
Hulu Kelang（N18）	Lembah Keramat AU 5c	098/18/13	SK Lembah Keramat
Hulu Kelang（N18）	Desa Keramat AU 2b & AU 2c	098/18/14	Dewan Serbaguna Taman Sri Keramat AU2
Hulu Kelang（N18）	Lembah Keramat AU 5d	098/18/15	SAR KAFA Integrasi At-Taqwa
Hulu Kelang（N18）	Keramat AU 1b	098/18/16	Dewan Pusat Komuniti Wanita Dan Belia Hulu Kelang
Hulu Kelang（N18）	AU3 Rumah Pangsa	098/18/17	Pusat Komuniti Rakyat Sri Pangsa AU 3/1
Hulu Kelang（N18）	Melawati Jalan G.E.C	098/18/18	SA Rakyat Taman Melawati
Hulu Kelang（N18）	Enggang Utara	098/18/19	SMK Taman Keramat
Hulu Kelang（N18）	Enggang Selatan	098/18/20	SK Taman Keramat 1; SMK Hulu Kelang

=== Representation history ===
Members of Parliament for Gombak
Parliament	No	Years	Member	Party	Vote Share
Constituency created from Selayang and Ampang Jaya
9th	P091	1995–1999	Zaleha Ismail (صالحة بنت اسماعيل)	BN (UMNO)	38,763; 83.10%
10th	P091	1999–2004	Zaleha Ismail (صالحة بنت اسماعيل)	BN (UMNO)	28,113; 50.72%
11th	P098	2004–2008	Raman Ismail (رحمن اسماعيل)	BN (UMNO)	39,870; 59.93%
12th	P098	2008–2013	Mohamed Azmin Ali (عزمين علي)	PR (PKR)	49,334; 54.65%
13th	P098	2013–2015	Mohamed Azmin Ali (عزمين علي)	PR (PKR)	54,827; 52.02%
13th	P098	2015–2018	Mohamed Azmin Ali (عزمين علي)	PH (PKR)	54,827; 52.02%
14th	P098	2018–2020	Mohamed Azmin Ali (عزمين علي)	PH (PKR)	75,113; 63.10%
14th	P098	2020–2022	Mohamed Azmin Ali (عزمين علي)	PN (BERSATU)	75,113; 63.10%
15th	P098	2022–present	Amirudin Shari (أمير الدين شاعري)	PH (PKR)	72,267; 43.69%

=== State constituency ===
Parliamentary constituency	State constituency						
Parliamentary constituency	1955–59*	1959–1974	1974–1986	1986–1995	1995–2004	2004–2018	2018–present
Gombak						Batu Caves	
Gombak					Gombak Setia		
Gombak					Hulu Kelang		
Gombak					Sungai Tua		Sungai Tua

=== Historical boundaries ===
State Constituency	Area		
State Constituency	1994	2003	2018
Batu Caves		Batu Caves; Kampung Laksamana; Kampung Nakhoda; Selayang Indah; Ulu Batu	
Gombak Setia	Pinggiran Batu Caves; Sri Gombak; Sungai Pusu; Taman Greenwood; Taman Melawati	Pinggiran Batu Caves; Sri Gombak; Sungai Pusu; Taman Greenwood; Taman Samudera	
Hulu Kelang	Desa Keramat; Taman Desa Keramat; Taman Permata; Taman Sri Keramat; Ulu Klang	Desa Keramat; Kuala Ampang; Taman Melawati; Ulu Klang; Ukay Perdana	Desa Keramat; Taman Melawati; Taman Permata; Taman Sri Keramat; Ulu Klang
Sungai Tua	Batu Caves; Kampung Laksamana; Selayang Indah; Taman Templer; Ulu Batu		Batu Caves; Kampung Laksamana; Kampung Lembah Indah; Kampung Nakhoda; Ulu Batu

=== Current state assembly members ===
No.	State Constituency	Member	Coalition (Party)
N16	Sungai Tua	Amirudin Shari	PH (PKR)
N17	Gombak Setia	Muhammad Hilman Idham	PN (BERSATU)
N18	Hulu Kelang	Mohamed Azmin Ali	PN (BERSATU)

=== Local governments & postcodes ===
No.	State Constituency	Local Government	Postcodes
N16	Sungai Tua	Selayang Municipal Council	68000 Ampang; 68100 Batu Caves; 53100, 53300, 54200 Kuala Lumpur
N17	Gombak Setia	Selayang Municipal Council	68000 Ampang; 68100 Batu Caves; 53100, 53300, 54200 Kuala Lumpur
N18	Hulu Kelang	Ampang Jaya Municipal Council	68000 Ampang; 68100 Batu Caves; 53100, 53300, 54200 Kuala Lumpur

== Election results ==
Malaysian general election, 2022
Party	Candidate	Votes	%	∆%
PH	Amirudin Shari	72,267	43.69	▲43.69
PN	Azmin Ali	59,538	35.99	▲35.99
BN	Megat Zulkarnain Omardin	30,723	18.57	▼3.60
PEJUANG	Aziz Jamaludin Mohd Tahir	2,223	1.34	▲1.34
Independent	Zulkifli Ahmad	675	0.41	▲0.41
Total valid votes		165,426	100.00	
Total rejected ballots		1,122		
Unreturned ballots		499		
Turnout		167,047	80.80	▼4.63
Registered electors		206,744		
Majority		12,729	7.70	▼33.23
PH hold		Swing		
Source(s) https://lom.agc.gov.my/ilims/upload/portal/akta/outputp/1753283/PUB612.pdf

Malaysian general election, 2018
Party	Candidate	Votes	%	∆%
PKR	Azmin Ali	75,113	63.10	▲11.08
BN	Abdul Rahim Pandak Kamarudin	26,392	22.17	▼25.36
PAS	Khairil Nizam Khirudin	17,537	14.73	▲14.73
Total valid votes		119,042	100.00	
Total rejected ballots		933		
Unreturned ballots		573		
Turnout		120,548	85.43	▼1.47
Registered electors		141,112		
Majority		48,721	40.93	▲36.40
PKR hold		Swing		
Source(s) "His Majesty's Government Gazette - Notice of Contested Election, Parliament for the State of Selangor [P.U. (B) 239/2018]" (PDF). Attorney General's Chambers of Malaysia. 3 May 2018. Archived from the original (PDF) on 2019-07-19. "Federal Government Gazette - Results of Contested Election and Statements of the Poll after the Official Addition of Votes, Parliamentary Constituencies for the State of Selangor [P.U. (B) 313/2018]" (PDF). Attorney General's Chambers of Malaysia. 28 May 2018. Archived from the original (PDF) on 2019-07-19.

Malaysian general election, 2013
Party	Candidate	Votes	%	∆%
PKR	Azmin Ali	54,827	52.02	▼2.63
BN	Raman Ismail	50,093	47.53	▲2.18
Independent	Said Nazar Abu Baker	474	0.45	▲0.45
Total valid votes		105,394	100.00	
Total rejected ballots		1,353		
Unreturned ballots		393		
Turnout		107,140	86.90	▲10.64
Registered electors		123,290		
Majority		4,734	4.49	▼4.81
PKR hold		Swing		
Source(s) "Federal Government Gazette - Notice of Contested Election, Parliament for the State of Selangor [P.U. (B) 176/2013]" (PDF). Attorney General's Chambers of Malaysia. 26 April 2013. Archived from the original (PDF) on 2018-09-30. "Federal Government Gazette - Results of Contested Election and Statements of the Poll after the Official Addition of Votes, Parliamentary Constituencies for the State of Selangor [P.U. (B) 217/2013]" (PDF). Attorney General's Chambers of Malaysia. 22 May 2013. Archived from the original (PDF) on 2018-09-30.

Malaysian general election, 2008
Party	Candidate	Votes	%	∆%
PKR	Azmin Ali	40,334	54.65	▲54.65
BN	Said Anuar Said Ahmad	33,467	45.35	▼14.58
Total valid votes		73,801	100.00	
Total rejected ballots		820		
Unreturned ballots		998		
Turnout		75,619	76.26	▲3.22
Registered electors		99,153		
Majority		6,867	9.30	▼10.56
PKR gain from BN		Swing		?

Malaysian general election, 2004
Party	Candidate	Votes	%	∆%
BN	Raman Ismail	39,870	59.93	▲9.21
PAS	Mohd Hatta Md. Ramli	26,663	40.07	▼9.21
Total valid votes		66,533	100.00	
Total rejected ballots		691		
Unreturned ballots		134		
Turnout		67,358	73.04	▼2.79
Registered electors		92,220		
Majority		13,207	19.86	▼18.42
BN hold		Swing		

Malaysian general election, 1999
Party	Candidate	Votes	%	∆%
BN	Zaleha Ismail	28,113	50.72	▼32.38
PAS	Mohd Hatta Md. Ramli	27,310	49.28	▲32.38
Total valid votes		55,423	100.00	
Total rejected ballots		649		
Unreturned ballots		2		
Turnout		56,074	75.83	▲4.90
Registered electors		73,946		
Majority		803	1.44	▼64.76
BN hold		Swing		

Malaysian general election, 1995
Party	Candidate	Votes	%
BN	Zaleha Ismail	38,763	83.10
PAS	Ismail Nahu	7,885	16.90
Total valid votes		46,648	100.00
Total rejected ballots		935	
Unreturned ballots		390	
Turnout		47,973	70.93
Registered electors		67,634	
Majority		30,878	66.20
This was a new constituency created out of Selayang which went to BN in the previous election.
