= Guchil =

State constituency in Kelantan, Malaysia

Guchil (N40)
Kelantan constituency

State constituency
- Legislature: Kelantan State Legislative Assembly
MLA
Hilmi Abdullah
PN
- Constituency created: 1974
- First contested: 1974
- Last contested: 2023

Demographics
- Electors (2023): 27,785

Guchil is a state constituency in Kelantan, Malaysia, that has been represented in the Kelantan State Legislative Assembly.

The state constituency was first contested in 1974 and is mandated to return a single Assemblyman to the Kelantan State Legislative Assembly under the first-past-the-post voting system.

== Demographics ==
Ethnic breakdown of Guchil's electorate as of 2023
1. Malay (86.1%)
2. Chinese (11.0%)
3. Indian (2.08%)
4. Other ethnicities (0.77%)

== History ==
=== Polling districts ===
According to the Gazette issued on 30 March 2018, the Guchil constituency has a total of 12 polling districts.

| State Constituency | Polling Districts | Code | Location |
|---|---|---|---|
| Guchil (N40) | Ladang Taku | 031/40/01 | SK Ladang Taku |
| Guchil (N40) | Kampung Bharu Guchil Utara | 031/40/02 | SMK Kuala Krai |
| Guchil (N40) | Sri Guchil | 031/40/03 | Kolej Vokesional Kuala Krai |
| Guchil (N40) | Kampung Bharu Guchil Tengah | 031/40/04 | SK Banggol Guchil |
| Guchil (N40) | Kampung Bharu Guchil Selatan | 031/40/05 | SK Sultan Yahya Petra (2) |
| Guchil (N40) | Bandar Kuala Krai | 031/40/06 | SJK (C) Yuk Chai |
| Guchil (N40) | Kg Hamzah | 031/40/07 | SMK Sultan Yahya Petra 1 |
| Guchil (N40) | Rkt Bahagia | 031/40/08 | SK Bahagia |
| Guchil (N40) | Tualang | 031/40/09 | SK Kuala Krai |
| Guchil (N40) | Kenor | 031/40/10 | SK Kampong Tengah |
| Guchil (N40) | Kuala Pahi | 031/40/11 | SMK Pahi |
| Guchil (N40) | Pahi | 031/40/12 | SK Pahi |

=== Representation history ===
Members of the Legislative Assembly for Guchil
| Assembly | No | Years | Member | Party |
Constituency created from Tanah Merah Timor
| 4th | N32 | 1974–1978 | Muhamad Awang | BN (UMNO) |
| 5th | N32 | 1978–1982 | Mohamad Isa | BN (UMNO) |
| 6th | N32 | 1982–1986 | Mohamad Isa | BN (UMNO) |
| 7th | N35 | 1986–1990 | Wan Hasan Wan Yusof | PAS |
| 8th | N35 | 1990–1995 | Wan Hasan Wan Yusof | PAS |
| 9th | N38 | 1995–1999 | Mohd Razali Che Mat | BN (UMNO) |
| 10th | N38 | 1999–2004 | Zulkafli Yacob | PAS |
| 11th | N40 | 2004–2008 | Shamsul Ikhwan Ashari Azmi | BN (UMNO) |
| 12th | N40 | 2008–2013 | Tuan Zamri Ariff Tuan Zakaria | PR (PKR) |
| 13th | N40 | 2013–2018 | Mohd Roslan Puteh | PR (PKR) |
| 14th | N40 | 2018–2020 | Hilmi Abdullah | PAS |
| 14th | N40 | 2020–2023 | Hilmi Abdullah | PN (PAS) |
| 15th | N40 | 2023–present | Hilmi Abdullah | PN (PAS) |

== Election results ==
Kelantan state election, 2023: Guchil
| Party | Candidate | Votes | % | ∆% |
|---|---|---|---|---|
| PAS | Hilmi Abdullah | 10,826 | 70.49 | ▲21.16 |
| BN | Zuber Hasan | 4,532 | 29.51 | ▼4.96 |
| Total valid votes | | 15,358 | 100.00 | |
| Total rejected ballots | | 101 | | |
| Unreturned ballots | | 21 | | |
| Turnout | | 15,480 | 55.71 | ▼19.80 |
| Registered electors | | 27,785 | | |
| Majority | | 6,294 | 40.98 | ▲26.12 |
| PAS hold | | Swing | | |

Kelantan state election, 2018: Guchil
| Party | Candidate | Votes | % | ∆% |
|---|---|---|---|---|
| PAS | Hilmi Abdullah | 7,564 | 49.33 | ▲49.33 |
| BN | Zuber Hassan | 5,285 | 34.47 | ▼13.32 |
| PKR | Mohd Roslan Puteh | 2,362 | 15.40 | ▼35.61 |
| Independent | Abd Aziz Ahmad | 123 | 0.80 | ▲0.80 |
| Total valid votes | | 15,334 | 100.00 | |
| Total rejected ballots | | 190 | | |
| Unreturned ballots | | 0 | | |
| Turnout | | 15,524 | 75.51 | ▼6.59 |
| Registered electors | | 20,560 | | |
| Majority | | 2,279 | 14.86 | ▲11.64 |
| PAS gain from PKR | | Swing | | ? |

Kelantan state election, 2013: Guchil
| Party | Candidate | Votes | % | ∆% |
|---|---|---|---|---|
| PKR | Mohd Roslan Puteh | 7,803 | 51.01 | ▼2.97 |
| BN | Nik Sapeia Nik Yusof | 7,311 | 47.79 | ▲1.77 |
| Independent | Muhamad Bustaman Yaacob | 146 | 0.95 | ▲0.95 |
| Independent | Md Nasir Ahmad | 37 | 0.25 | ▲0.25 |
| Total valid votes | | 15,297 | 100.00 | |
| Total rejected ballots | | 332 | | |
| Unreturned ballots | | 49 | | |
| Turnout | | 15,678 | 82.10 | ▲5.30 |
| Registered electors | | 19,088 | | |
| Majority | | 492 | 3.22 | ▼4.74 |
| PKR hold | | Swing | | |

Kelantan state election, 2008: Guchil
| Party | Candidate | Votes | % | ∆% |
|---|---|---|---|---|
| PKR | Tuan Zamri Ariff Tuan Zakaria | 6,784 | 53.98 | ▲53.98 |
| BN | Zaki Muhammad | 5,784 | 46.02 | ▼8.21 |
| Total valid votes | | 12,568 | 100.00 | |
| Total rejected ballots | | 298 | | |
| Unreturned ballots | | 59 | | |
| Turnout | | 12,925 | 76.80 | ▼0.77 |
| Registered electors | | 16,829 | | |
| Majority | | 1,000 | 7.96 | ▼0.95 |
| PKR gain from BN | | Swing | | ? |

Kelantan state election, 2004: Guchil
| Party | Candidate | Votes | % | ∆% |
|---|---|---|---|---|
| BN | Shamsul Ikhwan Ashari Azmi | 6,146 | 54.23 | ▲7.52 |
| PAS | Zulkafli Yacob | 5,136 | 45.32 | ▼7.97 |
| Independent | Mohd Zaki Kassim | 51 | 0.45 | ▲0.45 |
| Total valid votes | | 11,333 | 100.00 | |
| Total rejected ballots | | 168 | | |
| Unreturned ballots | | 38 | | |
| Turnout | | 11,539 | 77.57 | ▲3.93 |
| Registered electors | | 14,875 | | |
| Majority | | 1,010 | 8.91 | ▲2.33 |
| BN gain from PAS | | Swing | | ? |

Kelantan state election, 1999: Guchil
| Party | Candidate | Votes | % | ∆% |
|---|---|---|---|---|
| PAS | Zulkafli Yacob | 5,100 | 53.29 | ▲6.48 |
| BN | Mohd Razali Che Mat | 4,471 | 46.71 | ▼6.48 |
| Total valid votes | | 9,571 | 100.00 | |
| Total rejected ballots | | 185 | | |
| Unreturned ballots | | 18 | | |
| Turnout | | 9,774 | 73.64 | ▲0.51 |
| Registered electors | | 13,273 | | |
| Majority | | 629 | 6.58 | ▲0.20 |
| PAS gain from BN | | Swing | | ? |

Kelantan state election, 1995: Guchil
| Party | Candidate | Votes | % | ∆% |
|---|---|---|---|---|
| BN | Mohd Razali Che Mat | 4,809 | 53.19 | ▲19.07 |
| PAS | Wan Hasan Wan Yusof | 4,232 | 46.81 | ▼19.07 |
| Total valid votes | | 9,041 | 100.00 | |
| Total rejected ballots | | 163 | | |
| Unreturned ballots | | 53 | | |
| Turnout | | 9,257 | 73.13 | ▼5.80 |
| Registered electors | | 12,658 | | |
| Majority | | 577 | 6.38 | ▼25.38 |
| BN gain from PAS | | Swing | | ? |

Kelantan state election, 1990: Guchil
| Party | Candidate | Votes | % | ∆% |
|---|---|---|---|---|
| PAS | Wan Hasan Wan Yusof | 6,323 | 65.88 | ▲6.50 |
| BN | Mohamad Isa | 3,275 | 34.12 | ▼21.22 |
| Total valid votes | | 9,598 | 100.00 | |
| Total rejected ballots | | 304 | | |
| Unreturned ballots | | 0 | | |
| Turnout | | 9,902 | 78.93 | ▲3.76 |
| Registered electors | | 12,546 | | |
| Majority | | 3,048 | 31.76 | ▲27.56 |
| PAS hold | | Swing | | |

Kelantan state election, 1986: Guchil
| Party | Candidate | Votes | % | ∆% |
|---|---|---|---|---|
| PAS | Wan Hasan Wan Yusof | 4,078 | 52.10 | ▲3.01 |
| BN | Abdul Aziz Talib | 3,749 | 47.90 | ▲47.90 |
| Total valid votes | | 7,827 | 100.00 | |
| Total rejected ballots | | 356 | | |
| Unreturned ballots | | 0 | | |
| Turnout | | 8,183 | 75.17 | ▼9.01 |
| Registered electors | | 10,886 | | |
| Majority | | 329 | 4.20 | ▲2.39 |
| PAS gain from BN | | Swing | | ? |

Kelantan state election, 1982: Guchil
| Party | Candidate | Votes | % | ∆% |
|---|---|---|---|---|
| BN | Mohamed Isa | 3,729 | 50.91 | ▼3.34 |
| PAS | Wan Hasan Wan Yusof | 3,596 | 49.09 | ▲18.25 |
| Total valid votes | | 7,325 | 100.00 | |
| Total rejected ballots | | 156 | | |
| Unreturned ballots | | 0 | | |
| Turnout | | 7,481 | 84.18 | ▲7.20 |
| Registered electors | | 8,887 | | |
| Majority | | 133 | 1.82 | ▼21.58 |
| BN hold | | Swing | | |

Kelantan state election, 1978: Guchil
| Party | Candidate | Votes | % | ∆% |
|---|---|---|---|---|
| BN | Mohamed Isa | 2,594 | 54.25 | ▲54.25 |
| PAS | Mohammad bin Awang | 1,475 | 30.84 | ▼37.85 |
| Pan-Malaysian Islamic Front | Mat Hussin bin Hassan Ful | 713 | 14.91 | ▲14.91 |
| Total valid votes | | 4,782 | 100.00 | |
| Total rejected ballots | | 86 | | |
| Unreturned ballots | | 0 | | |
| Turnout | | 4,868 | 76.98 | ▼1.25 |
| Registered electors | | 6,324 | | |
| Majority | | 1,119 | 23.40 | ▼28.90 |
| BN hold | | Swing | | |

Kelantan state election, 1974: Guchil
| Party | Candidate | Votes | % |
|---|---|---|---|
| BN | Mohammad Awang | 2,853 | 68.70 |
| Independent | Mahmuzah Ismail Ali | 681 | 16.40 |
| Parti Sosialis Rakyat Malaysia | Ahd Rahman Yahya | 619 | 14.90 |
| Total valid votes | | 4,153 | 100.00 |
| Total rejected ballots | | 398 | |
| Unreturned ballots | | 0 | |
| Turnout | | 4,551 | 78.22 |
| Registered electors | | 5,818 | |
| Majority | | 2,172 | 52.30 |
This was a new constituency created.
