= Perak honours list =

Perak is one of the states in Malaysia that awards honours and titles.

== 2023 ==
- 2 recipients of Dato' Seri Paduka Mahkota Perak (SPMP), which carries the title Dato' Seri.
- 1 recipient of Dato' Seri Panglima Taming Sari (SPTS), which carries the title Dato' Seri Panglima.
- 14 recipients of Dato' Paduka Mahkota Perak (DPMP), which carries the title Dato'.
- 5 recipients of Darjah Dato' Pahlawan Taming Sari (DPTS), which carries the title Dato' Pahlawan.
- 1 recipient of Dato' Paduka Cura Si Manja Kini (DPCM), which carries the name Dato'.
- 1 recipient of Seniman Diraja (Royal Artist) award.

== 2010 ==
- Muhyiddin Yassin is the sole recipient of Darjah Kebesaran Seri Paduka Sultan Azlan Shah (SPSA), which carries the title Dato' Seri Diraja.
- Zaki Azmi is the sole recipient of Darjah Seri Paduka Cura Si Manja Kini (SPCM), which carries the title Dato' Seri.
- 3 recipients of Darjah Seri Panglima Taming Sari (SPTS), which carries the title Dato' Seri Panglima.
- 4 recipients of Darjah Seri Paduka Mahkota Perak (SPMP), which carries the title Dato' Seri.
- 7 recipients of Darjah Datuk Paduka Cura Simanja Kini (DPCM), which carries the title Dato'.
- 3 recipients of Darjah Datuk Pahlawan Taming Sari (DPTS), which carries the title Dato' Pahlawan.
- 46 recipients of Darjah Datuk Paduka Mahkota Perak (DPMP), which carries the title Dato'.

== 2009 ==
- 2 recipients of Darjah Seri Panglima Taming Sari (SPTS), which carries the title Dato' Seri Panglima.
- 4 recipients of Darjah Seri Paduka Mahkota Perak (SPMP), which carries the title Dato' Seri.
- 2 recipients of Darjah Datuk Paduka Cura Simanja Kini (DPCM), which carries the title Dato'.
- 9 recipients of Darjah Datuk Pahlawan Taming Sari (DPTS), which carries the title Dato' Pahlawan.
- 33 recipients of Darjah Datuk Paduka Mahkota Perak (DPMP), which carries the title Dato'.

== 2007 ==
- 1 recipient of Darjah Seri Paduka Cura Si Manja Kini (SPCM), which carries the title Dato' Seri.
- 1 recipient of Darjah Seri Panglima Taming Sari (SPTS), which carries the title Dato' Seri Panglima.
- 4 recipients of Darjah Seri Paduka Mahkota Perak (SPMP), which carries the title Dato' Seri.
- 3 recipients of Darjah Datuk Paduka Cura Simanja Kini (DPCM), which carries the title Dato'.
- 9 recipients of Darjah Datuk Pahlawan Taming Sari (DPTS), which carries the title Dato' Pahlawan.
- 40 recipients of Darjah Datuk Paduka Mahkota Perak (DPMP), which carries the title Dato'.

== 2006 ==
- 1 recipient of Darjah Seri Panglima Taming Sari (SPTS), which carries the title Dato' Seri Panglima.
- 6 recipients of Darjah Seri Paduka Mahkota Perak (SPMP), which carries the title Dato' Seri.
- 3 recipients of Darjah Datuk Paduka Cura Simanja Kini (DPCM), which carries the title Dato'.
- 6 recipients of Darjah Datuk Pahlawan Taming Sari (DPTS), which carries the title Dato' Pahlawan.
- 44 recipients of Darjah Datuk Paduka Mahkota Perak (DPMP), which carries the title Dato'.

== 2005 ==
- 1 recipient of Darjah Seri Panglima Taming Sari (SPTS), which carries the title Dato' Seri Panglima.
- 5 recipients of Darjah Seri Paduka Mahkota Perak (SPMP), which carries the title Dato' Seri.
- 2 recipients of Darjah Datuk Paduka Cura Simanja Kini (DPCM), which carries the title Dato'.
- 7 recipients of Darjah Datuk Pahlawan Taming Sari (DPTS), which carries the title Dato' Pahlawan.
- 31 recipients of Darjah Datuk Paduka Mahkota Perak (DPMP), which carries the title Dato'.

== 2004 ==
- 1 recipient of Darjah Kebesaran Seri Paduka Sultan Azlan Shah (SPSA), which carries the title Dato' Seri.
- 3 recipients of Darjah Seri Panglima Taming Sari (SPTS), which carries the title Dato' Seri Panglima.
- 1 recipients of Darjah Seri Paduka Mahkota Perak (SPMP), which carries the title Dato' Seri.
- 23 recipients of Darjah Datuk Paduka Mahkota Perak (DPMP), which carries the title Dato'.

== 2003 ==
- Abdullah Ahmad Badawi is sole recipient of Darjah Kebesaran Seri Paduka Sultan Azlan Shah (SPSA), which carries the title Dato' Seri.
- 2 recipients of Darjah Seri Panglima Taming Sari (SPTS), which carries the title Dato' Seri Panglima.
- 3 recipients of Darjah Seri Paduka Mahkota Perak (SPMP), which carries the title Dato' Seri.
- 3 recipients of Darjah Datuk Paduka Cura Simanja Kini (DPCM), which carries the title Dato'.
- 6 recipients of Darjah Datuk Pahlawan Taming Sari (DPTS), which carries the title Dato' Pahlawan.
- 40 recipients of Darjah Datuk Paduka Mahkota Perak (DPMP), which carries the title Dato'.

== 2000 ==
- 2 recipients of Datuk Seri Paduka Sultan Azlan (SPSA), which carries the title Dato' Seri.
- 8 recipients of Darjah Seri Paduka Mahkota Perak (SPMP), which carries the title Dato' Seri.
- 4 recipients of Datuk Paduka Cura Simanja Kini (DPCM), which carries the title Dato'.
- 8 recipients of Darjah Datuk Pahlawan Taming Sari (DPTS), which carries the title Dato' Pahlawan.
- 42 recipients of Darjah Datuk Paduka Mahkota Perak (DPMP), which carries the title Dato'.
