= Zaleha Ismail =

Malaysian politician (1936–2020)

Yang Berbahagia Tan Sri Datin Paduka Seri Zaleha Ismail PSM SSSA DPMS SMS KMN
- زالحة اسماعيل

Ministerial roles
- 1986–1987: Parliamentary Secretary of Lands and Regional Development
- 1987–1995: Deputy Minister of Transport
- 1995–1999: Minister of National Unity and Community Development

Faction represented in Dewan Rakyat
- 1982–2004: Barisan Nasional

Faction represented in Selangor State Legislative Assembly
- 1978–1982: Barisan Nasional

Personal details
- Born: 18 May 1936 Kuala Langat, Selangor, Federated Malay States, British Malaya (now Malaysia)
- Died: 14 November 2020 (aged 84) Kuala Lumpur, Malaysia
- Resting place: Taman Ibukota Muslim Cemetery, Setapak, Kuala Lumpur
- Citizenship: Malaysian
- Party: United Malays National Organisation (UMNO)
- Other political affiliations: Barisan Nasional (BN); Perikatan Nasional (PN); Muafakat Nasional (MN)
- Education: University of Malaya
- Occupation: Politician

Zaleha binti Ismail (Jawi: صالحة بنت اسماعيل; 18 May 1936 – 14 November 2020) was a Malaysian politician and among the women's leaders in Malaysia. She served as Minister of National Unity and Community Development from 1995 to 1999.

== Background ==
She was born in Kuala Langat, Selangor. She attended the Sungai Pelek Malay School and University of Malaya – Bachelor of Arts (Economics) in 1961.

== Career ==
At Radio Malaya (1962–1968) she worked as a Plan Assistant, then Manager of the English Service Plan. Additionally, she was a part-time Lecturer and Tutor at University of Malaya, while in 1968–1978 she became the Encyclopedia Officer in Dewan Bahasa dan Pustaka and subsequently the Deputy Head of Textbook Division.

Zaleha Ismail as well as Vice President of MUBARAK, was a former Malaysian MP and President of the Malaysian Council for Children Welfare, Women's Association of the ASEAN Association of Women, and President of the National Council of Women's Organizations. She was also equally influential regionally and internationally, as she was elected President of the Association of Women's Organizations (ACWO) in 1986 until 1988.

Zaleha continued to serve at ACWO even after she supported the president in various capacities such as vice president, Honorary Treasurer, and general secretary before being re-elected to lead ACWO as president in 1998 to 2000. She was also the Chairperson of the Population and Development Board Country Family in Malaysia. Zaleha Ismail was the Chairperson of Global Peace Foundation Malaysia and Spark Capital Development Berhad.

== Politics ==
In 1968 she became a regular member of UMNO and eventually the UMNO Supreme Council of Malaysia. She was involved in politics for 30 years. She started contesting the 1978 general election for the Permatang seat of Selangor State Legislative Assembly. She was Member of Parliament for Tanjong Karang (1982–1986) and Selayang (1986–1995) afterward. She continued to be Deputy Transport Minister from 1987 to 1995 when she became a member of parliament for Gombak (1995–2004). The peak of her career came as she was appointed by Prime Minister Mahathir Mohamad to take on the National Unity & Ministry of Social Development as Minister, from 1995 to 1999. In Malaysia's 1999 general election, she defeated Pan-Malaysian Islamic Party (PAS), Hatta Ramli with a majority of 803 votes.

== Death ==
On 14 November 2020, Zaleha Ismail died of several health complications at 8.15 pm at Tawakkal Hospital, Kuala Lumpur. She was 84 years old.

== Election results ==
Selangor State Legislative Assembly
Year	Constituency	Candidate	Votes	Pct	Opponent(s)	Votes	Pct	Ballots cast	Majority	Turnout
1978	N10 Permatang	Zaleha Ismail (UMNO)	4,865	60.45%	Norhadi Hasan Ali (PAS)	1,057	13.13%	N/A	2,739	N/A
1978	N10 Permatang	Zaleha Ismail (UMNO)	4,865	60.45%	Supian Sirman (IND)	2,126	26.42%	N/A	2,739	N/A

Parliament of Malaysia
Year	Constituency	Candidate	Votes	Pct	Opponent(s)	Votes	Pct	Ballots cast	Majority	Turnout
1982	P074 Tanjong Karang	Zaleha Ismail (UMNO)	16,396	75.44%	Abd Rahim Awang (PAS)	5,337	24.56%	22,856	11,059	68.63%
1986	P087 Selayang	Zaleha Ismail (UMNO)	40,681	81.54%	Talib Bakti (PAS)	9,209	18.46%	52,160	31,472	67.10%
1990	P087 Selayang	Zaleha Ismail (UMNO)	51,062	71.94%	Lee Yee Lian (DAP)	19,920	28.06%	73,482	31,142	73.86%
1995	P091 Gombak	Zaleha Ismail (UMNO)	38,763	83.10%	Ismail Nahu (PAS)	7,885	16.90%	47,973	30,878	70.93%
1999	P091 Gombak	Zaleha Ismail (UMNO)	28,113	50.72%	Mohd Hatta Ramli (PAS)	27,310	49.28%	56,074	803	75.83%

== Honours ==
She was awarded the Seri Mahkota Selangor Star, Bintang Kesatria Mangku Negara and Datuk Paduka Mahkota Selangor in 1979. Among the recent awards was the Global Peace Award in 2011, "Ibu Harmoni Tokoh" Award 2013 and Datin Paduka Seri Rosmah Mansor for Women leading in Amal.

=== Honours of Malaysia ===
- Malaysia
  - Officer of the Order of the Defender of the Realm (KMN) (1979)
  - Commander of the Order of Loyalty to the Crown of Malaysia (PSM) – Tan Sri (2003)
- Selangor
  - Companion of the Order of the Crown of Selangor (SMS)
  - Knight Commander of the Order of the Crown of Selangor (DPMS) – Datin Paduka (1980)
  - Knight Grand Companion of the Order of Sultan Salahuddin Abdul Aziz Shah (SSSA) – Datin Paduka Seri (2001)
