= Mengkebang =

State Constituency

Mengkebang (N39)
Kelantan constituency

State constituency
- Legislature: Kelantan State Legislative Assembly
MLA
Zubir Abu Bakar
PN
- Constituency created: 1994
- First contested: 1995
- Last contested: 2023

Demographics
- Population (2020): 30,952
- Electors (2023): 26,843

Mengkebang is a state constituency in Kelantan, Malaysia, that has been represented in the Kelantan State Legislative Assembly.

The state constituency was first contested in 1995 and is mandated to return a single Assemblyman to the Kelantan State Legislative Assembly under the first-past-the-post voting system.

== Demographics ==
As of 2020, Mengkebang has a population of 30,952 people.

Ethnic breakdown of Mengkebang's electorate as of 2023
1. Malay (96.0%)
2. Chinese (2.30%)
3. Indian (1.28%)
4. Other ethnicities (0.47%)

== History ==
=== Polling districts ===
According to the Gazette issued on 30 March 2018, the Mengkebang constituency has a total of 11 polling districts.

State Constituency	Polling Districts	Code	Location
Mengkebang (N39)	Pasir Kelang	031/39/01	SK Pasir Kelang
Mengkebang (N39)	Kuala Nal	031/39/02	SK Kuala Nal
Mengkebang (N39)	Bukit Sireh	031/39/03	SK Kampong Bedal
Mengkebang (N39)	Batu Jong	031/39/04	SK Batu Jong
Mengkebang (N39)	Keroh	031/39/05	SMK Keroh
Mengkebang (N39)	Pasir Gajah	031/39/06	SK Pasir Gajah
Mengkebang (N39)	Telekong	031/39/07	SK Telkong
Mengkebang (N39)	Sungai Durian	031/39/08	SK Sungai Embak
Mengkebang (N39)	Chenulang	031/39/09	SK Chenulang
Mengkebang (N39)	R.K.Y Mengkebang	031/39/10	SK Batu Mengkebang
Mengkebang (N39)	R.P.T Sungai Pas	031/39/11	SK Sungai Pas

=== Representation history ===
Members of the Legislative Assembly for Mengkebang
Assembly	No	Years	Member	Party
Constituency created from Temangan
9th	N39	1995–1999	Mek Som Mohamed	S46
10th	N39	1999–2004	Ibrahim Mahmood	PAS
11th	N39	2004–2008	Azizzuddin Hussein	BN (UMNO)
12th	N39	2008–2013	Abdul Latiff Abdul Rahman	PR (PAS)
13th	N39	2013–2018	Abdul Latiff Abdul Rahman	PR (PAS)
14th	N39	2018–2020	Muhammad Mat Sulaiman	PAS
14th	N39	2020–2023	Muhammad Mat Sulaiman	PN (PAS)
15th	N39	2023–present	Zubir Abu Bakar	PN (PAS)

== Election results ==
Kelantan state election, 2023: Mengkebang
Party	Candidate	Votes	%	∆%
PAS	Zubir Abu Bakar	12,531	78.64	▲20.79
PH	Mohd Shukri Ishak	3,404	21.36	▲21.36
Total valid votes		15,935	100.00	
Total rejected ballots		169		
Unreturned ballots		31		
Turnout		16,135	60.11	▼20.79
Registered electors		26,843		
Majority		9,127	57.28	▲36.42
PAS hold		Swing		

Kelantan state election, 2018: Mengkebang
Party	Candidate	Votes	%	∆%
PAS	Muhammad Mat Sulaiman	9,295	57.85	▲4.37
BN	Zaki Muhamad	5,944	36.99	▼9.53
PKR	Wan Mohd Azlan Wan Ahmad	829	5.16	▲5.16
Total valid votes		16,068	100.00	
Total rejected ballots		240		
Unreturned ballots		49		
Turnout		16,357	80.90	▼7.70
Registered electors		20,218		
Majority		3,351	20.86	▲13.90
PAS hold		Swing		

Kelantan state election, 2013: Mengkebang
Party	Candidate	Votes	%	∆%
PAS	Abdul Latiff Abdul Rahman	8,235	53.48	▼4.38
BN	Azizzuddin Hussein	7,163	46.52	▲4.38
Total valid votes		15,398	100.00	
Total rejected ballots		221		
Unreturned ballots		33		
Turnout		15,652	88.60	▲3.21
Registered electors		17,674		
Majority		1,072	6.96	▼8.76
PAS hold		Swing		

Kelantan state election, 2008: Mengkebang
Party	Candidate	Votes	%	∆%
PAS	Abdul Latiff Abdul Rahman	7,007	57.86	▲9.39
BN	Azizzuddin Hussein	5,104	42.14	▼9.39
Total valid votes		12,111	100.00	
Total rejected ballots		183		
Unreturned ballots		21		
Turnout		12,315	85.39	▲2.17
Registered electors		14,422		
Majority		1,903	15.72	▲12.66
PAS gain from BN		Swing		?

Kelantan state election, 2004: Mengkebang
Party	Candidate	Votes	%	∆%
BN	Azizzuddin Hussein	5,315	51.53	▲9.13
PAS	Abdul Latiff Abdul Rahman	4,999	48.47	▼9.13
Total valid votes		10,314	100.00	
Total rejected ballots		131		
Unreturned ballots		12		
Turnout		10,457	83.22	▲2.92
Registered electors		12,566		
Majority		316	3.06	▼12.14
BN gain from PAS		Swing		?

Kelantan state election, 1999: Mengkebang
Party	Candidate	Votes	%	∆%
PAS	Ibrahim Mahmood	6,457	57.60	▲57.60
BN	Kelthum Mohamed	4,754	42.40	▲2.53
Total valid votes		11,211	100.00	
Total rejected ballots		316		
Unreturned ballots		3		
Turnout		11,530	80.30	▲0.14
Registered electors		14,359		
Majority		1,703	15.20	▼5.06
PAS gain from S46		Swing		?

Kelantan state election, 1995: Mengkebang
Party	Candidate	Votes	%
S46	Mek Som Mohamed	6,231	60.13
BN	Nik Sapeia Nik Yusof	4,132	39.87
Total valid votes		10,363	100.00
Total rejected ballots		289	
Unreturned ballots		17	
Turnout		10,669	80.16
Registered electors		13,310	
Majority		2,099	20.26
This was a new constituency created.
