= Pangkor (state constituency) =

Political subdivision in Malaysia

Pangkor (N52)
Perak constituency

State constituency
- Legislature: Perak State Legislative Assembly
MLA
Norhaslida Zakaria
PN
- Constituency created: 1974
- First contested: 1974
- Last contested: 2022

Demographics
- Electors (2022): 30,554
- Area (km²): 221

Pangkor is a state constituency in Perak, Malaysia, that has been represented in the Perak State Legislative Assembly.

The state constituency was first contested in 1974 and is mandated to return a single Assemblyman to the Perak State Legislative Assembly under the first-past-the-post voting system.

== Definition ==
The Pangkor constituency boasts area of Manjung district that famous for tourism industry including township of Lumut, Marina Island, Teluk Batik, Damai Laut and Pangkor Island. The largest demographic voters for the constituency comes from naval base of TLDM. It contains the polling districts of Damar Laut, Lumut, Teluk Muroh, Pengkalan TLDM, Sungai Pinang Besar, Sungai Pinang Kechil, Pasir Bogak, Pekan Pangkor, and Telok Gedong.

== Demographics ==
Ethnic breakdown of Pangkor's electorate as of 2022
1. Malay (67.0%)
2. Chinese (23.7%)
3. Indian (5.72%)
4. Other ethnicities (3.58%)

Total electors by polling district in 2016
Polling district	Electors
Damar Laut	1,186
Lumut	1,011
Telok Muroh	1,561
Pengkalan TLDM	14,067
Sungai Pinang Besar	1,652
Sungai Pinang Kechil	2,072
Pasir Bogak	1,582
Pekan Pangkor	1,795
Telok Gedong	1,240
Total	26,166
Source: Malaysian Election Commission

== History ==
=== Polling districts ===
According to the federal gazette issued on 31 October 2022, the Pangkor constituency is divided into 9 polling districts.

State constituency	Polling District	Code	Location
Pangkor(N52)	Damar Laut	074/52/01	SK Nakhoda Muhammad Taib
Pangkor(N52)	Lumut	074/52/02	SK Methodist (ACS)
Pangkor(N52)	Telok Muroh	074/52/03	SK Dato' Ishak
Pangkor(N52)	Pengkalan TLDM	074/52/04	SMK Dindings
Pangkor(N52)	Sungai Pinang Besar	074/52/05	SJK (C) Hwa Lian (2)
Pangkor(N52)	Sungai Pinang Kechil	074/52/06	SJK (T) Pangkor
Pangkor(N52)	Pasir Bogak	074/52/07	SMK Pangkor
Pangkor(N52)	Pekan Pangkor	074/52/08	SK Seri Pangkor
Pangkor(N52)	Telok Gedong	074/52/09	SM Tahfiz Darul Ridzuan Daerah Manjung, Pulau Pangkor

=== Representation history ===
Perak State Legislative Assemblyman for Pangkor
Assembly	No	Years	Member	Party
Constituency created from Lumut
4th	N44	1974–1978	Phung Ah See @ Phung Teik Hua (冯德华)	DAP
5th	N44	1978–1982	Peter Tang Ah Lik (陈见场)	BN (MCA)
6th	N44	1982–1986	Ting Chek Ming (陈则明)	DAP
7th	N39	1986–1990	Rajasegaran Samy Nathan	BN (MIC)
8th	N39	1990–1995	Mohamad Wajdi Ishak	BN (UMNO)
9th	N44	1995–1999	Mohamad Wajdi Ishak	BN (UMNO)
10th	N44	1999–2004	Mohamad Wajdi Ishak	BN (UMNO)
11th	N52	2004–2008	Zambry Abdul Kadir	BN (UMNO)
12th	N52	2008–2013	Zambry Abdul Kadir	BN (UMNO)
13th	N52	2013–2018	Zambry Abdul Kadir	BN (UMNO)
14th	N52	2018 – 2022	Zambry Abdul Kadir	BN (UMNO)
15th	N52	2022 – present	Norhaslinda Zakaria	PN (BERSATU)

== Election results ==
Perak state election, 2022
Party	Candidate	Votes	%	∆%
PN	Norhaslinda Zakaria	8,507	38.65	▲38.65
BN	Norzaman Man	7,496	34.06	▼8.80
PH	Abdul Razak Nazri	5,654	25.69	▲25.69
PEJUANG	Mohd Azlan Suhaimi	181	0.82	▲0.82
Heritage	Yahaya Ahmad	170	0.77	▲0.77
Total valid votes		22,008	100.00	
Total rejected ballots		412		
Unreturned ballots		302		
Turnout		22,722	74.37	▼4.60
Registered electors		30,554		
Majority		1,011	4.59	▼4.00
PN gain from BN		Swing		?

Perak state election, 2018
Party	Candidate	Votes	%	∆%
BN	Zambry Abdul Kadir	8,378	44.28	▼18.72
PKR	Nordin Ahmad Ismail	6,752	35.69	▼1.05
PAS	Zainal Abidin Saad	3,638	19.23	▲18.61
Total valid votes		18,919	96.79	
Total rejected ballots		628	3.21	
Unreturned ballots		202	1.03	
Turnout		19,547	78.97	▼4.33
Registered electors		24,755		
Majority		1,219	8.59	▼17.67
BN hold		Swing		
Source(s) "RESULTS OF CONTESTED ELECTION AND STATEMENTS OF THE POLL AFTER THE OFFICIAL ADDITION OF VOTES".

Perak state election, 2013
Party	Candidate	Votes	%	∆%
BN	Zambry Abdul Kadir	12,291	63.00	▼5.05
PKR	Mohd. Saifullah Mohd. Zulkifli	7,167	36.74	▲4.79
Independent	Bernard Parenpa	51	0.26	▲0.26
Total valid votes		19,509	98.33	
Total rejected ballots		254	1.28	
Unreturned ballots		77	0.39	
Turnout		19,840	83.30	▼1.30
Registered electors		23,814		
Majority		5,124	26.26	▼9.84
BN hold		Swing		
Source(s) "KEPUTUSAN PILIHAN RAYA UMUM DEWAN UNDANGAN NEGERI". Archived from the original on 2013-05-08.

Perak state election, 2008
Party	Candidate	Votes	%	∆%
BN	Zambry Abdul Kadir	10,906	68.05	▼6.86
PKR	Pakhrazi Musa	5,121	31.95	▲7.91
Total valid votes		16,027	83.92	
Total rejected ballots		1,340	7.02	
Unreturned ballots		1,730	9.06	
Turnout		19,097	84.60	▲4.45
Registered electors		22,574		
Majority		5,785	36.10	▼14.77
BN hold		Swing		
Source(s) "KEPUTUSAN PILIHAN RAYA UMUM DEWAN UNDANGAN NEGERI PERAK BAGI TAHUN 2008".

Perak state election, 2004
Party	Candidate	Votes	%	∆%
BN	Zambry Abdul Kadir	8,349	74.91	▲19.47
PKR	Suwardi Sapuan	2,680	24.04	▼20.56
Independent	Mohd Ishak Mohd Som	117	1.05	▲1.05
Total valid votes		11,146	66.69	
Total rejected ballots		458	2.74	
Unreturned ballots		5,108	30.56	
Turnout		16,712	80.15	▼2.10
Registered electors		20,852		
Majority		5,669	50.87	▲39.99
BN hold		Swing		
Source(s) "KEPUTUSAN PILIHAN RAYA UMUM DEWAN UNDANGAN NEGERI PERAK BAGI TAHUN 2004".

Perak state election, 1999
Party	Candidate	Votes	%	∆%
BN	Mohamad Wajdi Ishak	7,112	55.44	▼26.23
PKR	Mohd Nor Mohd Ali	5,716	44.56	▲44.56
Total valid votes		12,828	61.59	
Total rejected ballots		396	1.90	
Unreturned ballots		7,603	36.51	
Turnout		20,827	82.25	▲3.71
Registered electors		25,323		
Majority		1,396	10.88	▼52.46
BN hold		Swing		
Source(s) "KEPUTUSAN PILIHAN RAYA UMUM DEWAN UNDANGAN NEGERI PERAK BAGI TAHUN 1999".

Perak state election, 1995
Party	Candidate	Votes	%	∆%
BN	Mohamad Wajdi Ishak	10,024	81.67	▲16.53
S46	Che'Su Mat Yusof	2,250	18.33	▼16.53
Total valid votes		12,274	100.00	
Total rejected ballots		358		
Unreturned ballots		3,212		
Turnout		15,844	78.54	▲2.06
Registered electors		20,173		
Majority		7,774	63.34	▲33.06
BN hold		Swing		
Source(s) "KEPUTUSAN PILIHAN RAYA UMUM DEWAN UNDANGAN NEGERI PERAK BAGI TAHUN 1995".

Perak state election, 1990
Party	Candidate	Votes	%	∆%
BN	Mohamed Wajdi Ishak	15,132	65.14	▲65.14
S46	Abu Hassan Usop	8,099	34.86	▲34.86
Total valid votes		23,231	100.00	
Total rejected ballots		629		
Unreturned ballots		2,564		
Turnout		26,424	76.48	▲12.15
Registered electors		34,551		
Majority		7,033	30.27	▲17.42
BN hold		Swing		

Perak state election, 1986
Party	Candidate	Votes	%	∆%
BN	Raja Segaran Samy Nathan	8,705	52.15	▲52.15
DAP	Hu Chan You	6,559	39.29	▼13.32
PAS	Sidek Mohd Noor	1,429	8.56	▲5.23
Total valid votes		16,693	100.00	
Total rejected ballots		270		
Unreturned ballots		0		
Turnout		16,963	64.33	▼10.44
Registered electors		26,370		
Majority		2,146	12.86	▲4.30
BN gain from DAP		Swing		-

Perak state election, 1982
Party	Candidate	Votes	%	∆%
DAP	Ting Chek Ming	6,758	52.61	▲8.16
BN	Cherng Chien Chang	5,659	44.06	▼7.71
PAS	Mohamed Salleh Mohd Gaus	428	3.33	▼0.44
Total valid votes		12,845	100.00	
Total rejected ballots		214		
Unreturned ballots		0		
Turnout		13,059	74.77	▼2.20
Registered electors		17,466		
Majority		1,099	8.56	▲1.24
DAP gain from BN		Swing		-

Perak state election, 1978
Party	Candidate	Votes	%	∆%
BN	Cherng Chien Chang	5,953	51.77	▲51.77
DAP	Phung Teik Hua	5,112	44.46	▲0.36
PAS	Mohamed Salleh Mohd Gaus	434	3.77	▲3.77
Total valid votes		11,499	100.00	
Total rejected ballots		315		
Unreturned ballots		0		
Turnout		11,814	76.97	▲1.80
Registered electors		15,349		
Majority		841	7.31	▼1.81
BN gain from DAP		Swing		-

Perak state election, 1974
Party	Candidate	Votes	%
DAP	Phung Teik Hua	4,061	44.10
BN	Cherng Chien Chang	3,221	34.98
Independent	Wong Ting Seng	1,927	20.93
Total valid votes		9,209	100.00
Total rejected ballots		502	
Unreturned ballots		0	
Turnout		9,711	75.17
Registered electors		12,919	
Majority		840	9.12
This was a new constituency created.

== See also ==
- Constituencies of Perak
