= List of Malaysian State Assembly Representatives (2023–present) =

Current subnational legislature representatives

List of Malaysian State Assembly Representatives (2018–2023)
List of Malaysian State Assembly Representatives (2023–present)

The following are the members of the Dewan Undangan Negeri or state assemblies, elected in the 2022 state elections which was part of the 2022 Malaysian general elections. Also included are the list of the Sabah state assembly members who were elected in 2020, Malacca state assembly members who were elected in 2021, Sarawak state assembly members who were elected in 2021, and Johor state assembly members who were elected in 2022. (Note: since 12 August 2023)

== Perlis ==
15th Perlis State Legislative Assembly
←	14th Assembly	16th Assembly	→

Overview
- Legislative body: Perlis State Legislative Assembly
- Jurisdiction: Perlis
- Meeting place: Perlis State Assembly Complex, Kangar
- Term: 19 December 2022 – Present
- Election: 2022 state election
- Government: Perlis State Executive Council
- Website: www.perlis.gov.my
- Members: 15
- Speaker: Rus'sele Eizan
- Secretary: Syed Omar Sharifuddin
- Menteri Besar: Mohd Shukri Ramli
- Opposition Leader: Gan Ay Ling
- Party control: Perikatan Nasional

Sovereign
- Raja: Tuanku Syed Sirajuddin

Sessions
- 1st: 19 December 2022 – Present

No.	State Constituency	Member	Coalition (Party)
PN 10 | VAC 4 | PH 1
N01	Titi Tinggi	Izizam Ibrahim	PN (BERSATU)
N02	Beseri	Haziq Asyraf Dun	PN (PAS)
N03	Chuping	Vacant since 25 December 2025	VAC
N03	Chuping	Saad Seman until 25 December 2025 (Note: On 24 December 2025, Saad Seman had his party membership terminated and thus became an independent.)	IND
N04	Mata Ayer	Vacant since 31 October 2026	VAC
N04	Mata Ayer	Wan Badariah Wan Saad until 31 October 2026	PN (PAS)
N05	Santan	Azmir Azizan	PN (PAS)
N06	Bintong	Vacant since 25 December 2025	VAC
N06	Bintong	Fakhrul Anwar Ismail until 25 December 2025 (Note: On 24 December 2025, Fakhrul Anwar Ismail had his party membership terminated and thus became an independent.)	IND
N07	Sena	Marzita Mansor	PN (BERSATU)
N08	Indera Kayangan	Gan Ay Ling	PH (PKR)
N09	Kuala Perlis	Abu Bakar Hamzah	PN (BERSATU)
N10	Kayang	Asrul Aimran Abd Jalil	PN (PAS)
N11	Pauh	Megat Hashirat Hassan	PN (BERSATU)
N12	Tambun Tulang	Wan Zikri Afthar Ishak	PN (BERSATU)
N13	Guar Sanji	Vacant since 25 December 2025	VAC
N13	Guar Sanji	Mohd Ridzuan Hashim until 25 December 2025 (Note: On 24 December 2025, Mohd Ridzuan Hashim had his party membership terminated and thus became an independent.)	IND
N14	Simpang Empat	Razali Saad	PN (PAS)
N15	Sanglang	Mohd Shukri Ramli	PN (PAS)

== Kedah ==
15th Kedah State Legislative Assembly
←	14th Assembly	16th Assembly	→

Overview
- Legislative body: Kedah State Legislative Assembly
- Jurisdiction: Kedah
- Meeting place: Wisma Darul Aman, Alor Setar
- Term: 25 September 2023 – present
- Election: 2023 state election
- Government: Kedah State Executive Council
- Website: mmk.kedah.gov.my
- Members: 36
- Speaker: Zubir Ahmad
- Deputy Speaker: Abdul Razak Khamis
- Secretary: Iqbal Ahmad
- Menteri Besar: Muhammad Sanusi Md Nor
- Opposition Leader: Bau Wong Bau Ek
- Party control: Perikatan Nasional

Sovereign
- Sultan: Sultan Sallehuddin

Sessions
- 1st: 25 September 2023 – present

No.	State Constituency	Member	Coalition (Party)
PN 33 | PH 3
N01	Ayer Hangat	Shamsilah Siru	PN (BERSATU)
N02	Kuah	Amar Pared Mahamud	PN (BERSATU)
N03	Kota Siputeh	Mohd Ashraf Mustaqim Badrul Munir	PN (BERSATU)
N04	Ayer Hitam	Azhar Ibrahim	PN (PAS)
N05	Bukit Kayu Hitam	Halimaton Shaadiah Saad	PN (BERSATU)
N06	Jitra	Haim Hilman Abdullah	PN (PAS)
N07	Kuala Nerang	Mohamad Yusoff Zakaria	PN (PAS)
N08	Pedu	Mohd Radzi Md Amin	PN (PAS)
N09	Bukit Lada	Salim Mahmood	PN (PAS)
N10	Bukit Pinang	Wan Romani Wan Salim	PN (PAS)
N11	Derga	Muhamad Amri Wahab	PN (BERSATU)
N12	Suka Menanti	Dzowahir Ab Ghani (Note: On 8 May, Dzowahir had his party membership terminated and thus became an independent.)	PN (WAWASAN)
N13	Kota Darul Aman	Teh Swee Leong	PH (DAP)
N14	Alor Mengkudu	Muhamad Radhi Mat Din	PN (PAS)
N15	Anak Bukit	Rashidi Razak	PN (PAS)
N16	Kubang Rotan	Mohd Salleh Saidin	PN (BERSATU)
N17	Pengkalan Kundor	Mardhiyyah Johari	PN (PAS)
N18	Tokai	Mohd Hayati Othman	PN (PAS)
N19	Sungai Tiang	Abdul Razak Khamis (Note: On 8 May, Dzowahir had his party membership terminated and thus became an independent.)	PN (WAWASAN)
N20	Sungai Limau	Mohd Azam Abd Samat	PN (PAS)
N21	Guar Chempedak	Abdul Ghafar Saad	PN (BERSATU)
N22	Gurun	Baddrol Bakhtiar	PN (PAS)
N23	Belantek	Ahmad Sulaiman	PN (PAS)
N24	Jeneri	Muhammad Sanusi Md Nor	PN (PAS)
N25	Bukit Selambau	Azizan Hamzah	PN (PAS)
N26	Tanjong Dawai	Hanif Ghazali	PN (PAS)
N27	Pantai Merdeka	Sharir Long	PN (PAS)
N28	Bakar Arang	Adam Loh Wei Chai	PH (PKR)
N29	Sidam	Bau Wong Bau Ek	PH (PKR)
N30	Bayu	Mohd Taufik Yaacob	PN (BERSATU)
N31	Kupang	Najmi Ahmad	PN (PAS)
N32	Kuala Ketil	Mansor Zakaria	PN (PAS)
N33	Merbau Pulas	Siti Aishah Ghazali	PN (PAS)
N34	Lunas	Khairul Anuar Ramli	PN (BERSATU)
N35	Kulim	Wong Chia Zhen	PN (Gerakan)
N36	Bandar Baharu	Mohd Suffian Yusoff	PN (PAS)

== Kelantan ==
15th Kelantan State Legislative Assembly
←	14th Assembly	16th Assembly	→

Overview
- Legislative body: Kelantan State Legislative Assembly
- Jurisdiction: Kelantan
- Meeting place: Kota Darul Naim, Kota Bharu
- Term: 5 September 2023 – present
- Election: 2023 state election
- Government: Kelantan State Executive Council
- Website: www.kelantan.gov.my
- Members: 45
- Speaker: Mohd Amar Abdullah
- Deputy Speaker: Mohamed Farid Mohamed Zawawi
- Secretary: Mohd Zaika Yamani Ibrahim
- Menteri Besar: Mohd. Nassuruddin Daud
- Opposition Leader: Mohd Syahbuddin Hashim
- Party control: Perikatan Nasional

Sovereign
- Sultan: Sultan Muhammad V

Sessions
- 1st: 5 September 2023 – present

No.	State Constituency	Member	Coalition (Party)
PN 42 | BN 2 | PH 1
N01	Pengkalan Kubor	Wan Roslan Wan Hamat	PN (PAS)
N02	Kelaboran	Mohd Adenan Hassan	PN (PAS)
N03	Pasir Pekan	Ahmad Yaakob	PN (PAS)
N04	Wakaf Bharu	Mohd Rusli Abdullah	PN (PAS)
N05	Kijang	Izani Husin	PN (PAS)
N06	Chempaka	Nik Asma' Bahrum Nik Abdullah	PN (PAS)
N07	Panchor	Nik Mohd. Amar Nik Abdullah	PN (PAS)
N08	Tanjong Mas	Rohani Ibrahim	PN (PAS)
N09	Kota Lama	Hafidzah Mustakim	PH (AMANAH)
N10	Bunut Payong	Shaari Mat Yaman	PN (PAS)
N11	Tendong	Rozi Muhamad	PN (PAS)
N12	Pengkalan Pasir	Mohd Nasriff Daud	PN (PAS)
N13	Meranti	Mohd Nassuruddin Daud	PN (PAS)
N14	Chetok	Zuraidin Abdullah	PN (PAS)
N15	Gual Periok	Kamaruzaman Mohamad	PN (PAS)
N16	Apam Putra	Zamakhsaei Muhamad	PN (PAS)
N17	Salor	Saizol Ismail	PN (PAS)
N18	Pasir Tumboh	Abd Rahman Yunus	PN (PAS)
N19	Demit	Mohd Asri Mat Daud	PN (PAS)
N20	Tawang	Harun Ismail	PN (PAS)
N21	Pantai Irama	Mohd Huzaimy Che Husin	PN (PAS)
N22	Jelawat	Zameri Mat Nawang	PN (PAS)
N23	Melor	Wan Rohimi Wan Daud	PN (PAS)
N24	Kadok	Azami Mohd Nor	PN (PAS)
N25	Kok Lanas	Mohamed Farid Mohamed Zawawi (Note: On 11 May, Mohamed Farid had his party membership terminated and thus became an independent.)	PN (WAWASAN)
N26	Bukit Panau	Abdul Fattah Mahmood	PN (PAS)
N27	Gual Ipoh	Bahari Mohamad Nor	PN (BERSATU)
N28	Kemahang	Md Anizam Ab Rahman	PN (PAS)
N29	Selising	Tuan Mohd Saripuddin Tuan Ismail	PN (PAS)
N30	Limbongan	Nor Asilah Mohamed Zin	PN (PAS)
N31	Semerak	Nor Sham Sulaiman	PN (PAS)
N32	Gaal	Mohd Rodzi Ja'afar	PN (PAS)
N33	Pulai Chondong	Azhar Salleh	PN (PAS)
N34	Temangan	Mohamed Fadzli Hassan	PN (PAS)
N35	Kemuning	Ahmad Zakhran Mat Noor	PN (PAS)
N36	Bukit Bunga	Mohd Almidi Jaafar	PN (BERSATU)
N37	Ayer Lanas	Kamarudin Md Nor	PN (BERSATU)
N38	Kuala Balah	Abdul Hadi Awang Kechil	PN (PAS)
N39	Mengkebang	Zubir Abu Bakar	PN (PAS)
N40	Guchil	Hilmi Abdullah	PN (PAS)
N41	Manek Urai	Mohd Fauzi Abdullah	PN (PAS)
N42	Dabong	Ku Mohd Zaki Ku Hussien	PN (PAS)
N43	Nenggiri	Mohd Azmawi Fikri Abdul Ghani since 17 August 2024	BN (UMNO)
N43	Nenggiri	Mohd Azizi Abu Naim until 19 June 2024	PN (BERSATU)
N44	Paloh	Shaari Mat Hussain	PN (BERSATU)
N45	Galas	Mohd Syahbuddin Hashim	BN (UMNO)

== Terengganu ==
15th Terengganu State Legislative Assembly
←	13th Assembly	16th Assembly	→

Overview
- Legislative body: Terengganu State Legislative Assembly
- Jurisdiction: Terengganu
- Meeting place: Wisma Darul Iman, Kuala Terengganu
- Term: 24 September 2023 – present
- Election: 2023 state election
- Government: Terengganu State Executive Council
- Website: www.terengganu.gov.my
- Members: 32 elected members
- Speaker: Mohd Nor Hamzah
- Deputy Speaker: Khazan Che Mat
- Secretary: Zulkifli Isa
- Menteri Besar: Ahmad Samsuri Mokhtar
- Party control: Perikatan Nasional

Sovereign
- Sultan: Sultan Mizan Zainal Abidin

Sessions
- 1st: 24 September 2023 – present

No.	State Constituency	Member	Coalition (Party)
PN 33
N01	Kuala Besut	Azbi Salleh	PN (PAS)
N02	Kota Putera	Mohd Nurkhuzaini Ab Rahman	PN (PAS)
N03	Jertih	Riduan Mohamad Nor	PN (PAS)
N04	Hulu Besut	Mohd Husaimi Hussin	PN (BERSATU)
N05	Jabi	Azman Ibrahim	PN (PAS)
N06	Permaisuri	Mohd Yusop Majid	PN (BERSATU)
N07	Langkap	Azmi Maarof	PN (PAS)
N08	Batu Rakit	Mohd Shafizi Ismail	PN (PAS)
N09	Tepuh	Hishamuddin Abdul Karim	PN (PAS)
N10	Buluh Gading	Ridzuan Hashim	PN (PAS)
N11	Seberang Takir	Khazan Che Mat	PN (BERSATU)
N12	Bukit Tunggal	Zaharudin Zahid	PN (PAS)
N13	Wakaf Mempelam	Wan Sukairi Wan Abdullah	PN (PAS)
N14	Bandar	Ahmad Shah Muhamed	PN (PAS)
N15	Ladang	Zuraida Md Noor	PN (PAS)
N16	Batu Buruk	Muhammad Khalil Abdul Hadi	PN (PAS)
N17	Alur Limbat	Ariffin Deraman	PN (PAS)
N18	Bukit Payung	Mohd Nor Hamzah	PN (PAS)
N19	Ru Rendang	Ahmad Samsuri Mokhtar	PN (PAS)
N20	Pengkalan Berangan	Sulaiman Sulong	PN (PAS)
N21	Telemung	Mohd Zawawi Ismail	PN (BERSATU)
N22	Manir	Hilmi Harun	PN (PAS)
N23	Kuala Berang	Mamad Puteh	PN (PAS)
N24	Ajil	Maliaman Kassim	PN (PAS)
N25	Bukit Besi	Ghazali Sulaiman	PN (PAS)
N26	Rantau Abang	Mohd Fadhli Rahmi Zulkifli	PN (PAS)
N27	Sura	Tengku Muhammad Fakhruddin	PN (PAS)
N28	Paka	Satiful Bahri Mamat	PN (PAS)
N29	Kemasik	Saiful Azmi Suhaili	PN (PAS)
N30	Kijal	Razali Idris	PN (BERSATU)
N31	Cukai	Hanafiah Mat	PN (PAS)
N32	Air Putih	Mohd Hafiz Adam	PN (PAS)
—	Nominated member	Chan Chee How	PN (Gerakan)

== Penang ==
15th Penang State Legislative Assembly
←	14th Assembly	16th Assembly	→

Overview
- Legislative body: Penang State Legislative Assembly
- Jurisdiction: Penang
- Meeting place: Penang State Assembly Building, George Town
- Term: 29 August 2023 – present
- Election: 2023 state election
- Government: Penang State Executive Council
- Website: dun.penang.gov.my
- Members: 40
- Speaker: Law Choo Kiang
- Deputy Speaker: Azrul Mahathir Aziz
- Secretary: Mohd Farulizam Che Meh
- Government Leader: Chow Kon Yeow
- Opposition Leader: Muhammad Fauzi Yusoff
- Party control: Pakatan Harapan

Sovereign
- Yang di-Pertua Negeri: Ahmad Fuzi Abdul Razak

Sessions
- 1st: 29 August 2023 – present

No.	State Constituency	Member	Coalition (Party)
PH 27 | PN 11 | BN 2
N01	Penaga	Mohd Yusni Mat Piah	PN (PAS)
N02	Bertam	Reezal Merican Naina Merican	BN (UMNO)
N3	Pinang Tunggal	Bukhori Ghazali	PN (PAS)
N04	Permatang Berangan	Mohd Sobri Saleh	PN (PAS)
N05	Sungai Dua	Muhammad Fauzi Yusoff	PN (PAS)
N06	Telok Ayer Tawar	Azmi Alang	PN (BERSATU)
N07	Sungai Puyu	Phee Syn Tze	PH (DAP)
N08	Bagan Jermal	Chee Yeeh Keen	PH (DAP)
N09	Bagan Dalam	Kumaran Krishnan	PH (DAP)
N10	Seberang Jaya	Izhar Shah Arif Shah	PN (BERSATU)
N11	Permatang Pasir	Amir Hamzah Abdul Hashim	PN (PAS)
N12	Penanti	Zulkefli Bakar	PN (BERSATU)
N13	Berapit	Heng Lee Lee	PH (DAP)
N14	Machang Bubuk	Lee Khai Loon	PH (PKR)
N15	Padang Lalang	Daniel Gooi Zi Sen	PH (DAP)
N16	Perai	Sundarajoo Somu	PH (DAP)
N17	Bukit Tengah	Gooi Hsiao Leung	PH (PKR)
N18	Bukit Tambun	Goh Choon Aik	PH (PKR)
N19	Jawi	Jason H'ng Mooi Lye	PH (DAP)
N20	Sungai Bakap	Abidin Ismail since 6 July 2024 (Note: Abidin Ismail was elected to State Legislative Assembly in the Sungai Bakap by-election, 2024 following the death of Nor Zamri Latiff.)	PN (PAS)
N20	Sungai Bakap	Nor Zamri Latiff until 24 May 2024	PN (PAS)
N21	Sungai Acheh	Rashidi Zinol	BN (UMNO)
N22	Tanjong Bunga	Zairil Khir Johari	PH (DAP)
N23	Air Putih	Lim Guan Eng	PH (DAP)
N24	Kebun Bunga	Lee Boon Heng	PH (PKR)
N25	Pulau Tikus	Joshua Woo Sze Zeng	PH (DAP)
N26	Padang Kota	Chow Kon Yeow	PH (DAP)
N27	Pengkalan Kota	Wong Yuee Harng	PH (DAP)
N28	Komtar	Teh Lai Heng	PH (DAP)
N29	Datok Keramat	Jagdeep Singh Deo	PH (DAP)
N30	Sungai Pinang	Lim Siew Khim	PH (DAP)
N31	Batu Lancang	Ong Ah Teong	PH (DAP)
N32	Seri Delima	Connie Tan Hooi Peng	PH (DAP)
N33	Air Itam	Joseph Ng Soon Siang	PH (DAP)
N34	Paya Terubong	Wong Hon Wai	PH (DAP)
N35	Batu Uban	Kumaresan Aramugam	PH (PKR)
N36	Pantai Jerejak	Fahmi Zainol	PH (PKR)
N37	Batu Maung	Mohamad Abdul Hamid	PH (PKR)
N38	Bayan Lepas	Azrul Mahathir Aziz	PH (AMANAH)
N39	Pulau Betong	Mohamad Shukor Zakariah	PN (PAS)
N40	Telok Bahang	Muhamad Kasim	PN (BERSATU)

== Perak ==
15th Perak State Legislative Assembly
←	14th Assembly	16th Assembly	→

Overview
- Legislative body: Perak State Legislative Assembly
- Jurisdiction: Perak
- Meeting place: Bangunan Perak Darul Ridzuan, Ipoh
- Term: 19 December 2022 – Present
- Election: 2022 state election
- Government: Perak State Executive Council
- Website: www.perak.gov.my
- Members: 59
- Speaker: Mohamad Zahir Abdul Khalid
- Deputy Speaker: Jenny Choy Tsi Jen
- Secretary: Shahrul Azam Shaari
- Government Leader: Saarani Mohammad
- Opposition Leader: Razman Zakaria
- Party control: Pakatan Harapan - Barisan Nasional

Sovereign
- Sultan: Sultan Nazrin Muizzuddin Shah

Sessions
- 1st: 19 December 2022 – Present

No.	State Constituency	Member	Coalition (Party)
PH 24 | PN 26 | BN 9
N01	Pengkalan Hulu	Mohamad Amin Roslan	PN (PAS)
N02	Temengor	Salbiah Mohamed	BN (UMNO)
N03	Kenering	Husairi Ariffin	PN (PAS)
N04	Kota Tampan	Saarani Mohamad	BN (UMNO)
N05	Selama	Mohd Akmal Kamaruddin	PN (PAS)
N06	Kubu Gajah	Khalil Yahaya	PN (PAS)
N07	Batu Kurau	Mohd Najmuddin Elias	PN (BERSATU)
N08	Titi Serong	Muhammad Hakimi Hamzi Mohd Hayat	PN (PAS)
N09	Kuala Kurau	Abdul Yunus Jamahri	PN (BERSATU)
N10	Alor Pongsu	Noor Azman Ghazali	PN (BERSATU)
N11	Gunong Semanggol	Razman Zakaria	PN (PAS)
N12	Selinsing	Sallehuddin Abdullah	PN (PAS)
N13	Kuala Sepetang	Ahmad Man	PN (BERSATU)
N14	Changkat Jering	Rahim Ismail	PN (PAS)
N15	Trong	Muhammad Faisal Abdul Rahman	PN (PAS)
N16	Kamunting	Mohd Fakhrudin Abdul Aziz	PN (PAS)
N17	Pokok Assam	Ong Seng Guan	PH (DAP)
N18	Aulong	Teh Kok Lim	PH (DAP)
N19	Chenderoh	Syed Lukman Hakim Syed Mohd Zin	PN (BERSATU)
N20	Lubok Merbau	Azizi Mohamed Ridzuan	PN (PAS)
N21	Lintang	Mohd Zolkafly Harun	BN (UMNO)
N22	Jalong	Loh Sze Yee	PH (DAP)
N23	Manjoi	Mohd Hafez Sabri	PN (PAS)
N24	Hulu Kinta	Muhamad Arafat Varisai Mahamad	PH (PKR)
N25	Canning	Jenny Choy Tsi Jen	PH (DAP)
N26	Tebing Tinggi	Abdul Aziz Bari	PH (DAP)
N27	Pasir Pinji	Goh See Hua	PH (DAP)
N28	Bercham	Ong Boon Piow	PH (DAP)
N29	Kepayang	Nga Kor Ming	PH (DAP)
N30	Buntong	Thulsi Thivani Manogaran	PH (DAP)
N31	Jelapang	Cheah Pou Hian	PH (DAP)
N32	Menglembu	Chaw Kam Foon	PH (DAP)
N33	Tronoh	Steven Tiw Tee Siang	PH (DAP)
N34	Bukit Chandan	Hashim Bujang	PN (BERSATU)
N35	Manong	Burhanuddin Ahmad	PN (PAS)
N36	Pengkalan Baharu	Azman Noh	BN (UMNO)
N37	Pantai Remis	Wong May Ing	PH (DAP)
N38	Astaka	Jason Ng Thien Yeong	PH (DAP)
N39	Belanja	Khairudin Abu Hanipah	BN (UMNO)
N40	Bota	Najihatussalehah Ahmad	PN (PAS)
N41	Malim Nawar	Bavani Veraiah	PH (DAP)
N42	Keranji	Angeline Koo Haai Yen	PH (DAP)
N43	Tulang Sekah	Mohd Azlan Helmi	PH (PKR)
N44	Sungai Rapat	Mohammad Nizar Jamaluddin	PH (AMANAH)
N45	Simpang Pulai	Wong Chai Yi	PH (PKR)
N46	Teja	Sandrea Ng Shy Ching	PH (PKR)
N47	Chenderiang	Choong Shin Heng	BN (MCA)
N48	Ayer Kuning	Mohamad Yusri Bakir since 26 April 2025 (Note: Mohamad Yusri Bakir was elected to State Legislative Assembly in the Ayer Kuning by-election, 2025 following the death of Ishsam Shahruddin.)	BN (UMNO)
N48	Ayer Kuning	Ishsam Shahruddin until 22 February 2025	BN (UMNO)
N49	Sungai Manik	Zainol Fadzi Paharudin (Note: On 13 February 2026, Zainol had his party membership terminated and thus became an independent.)	PN (WAWASAN)
N50	Kampong Gajah	Zafarulazhan Zan	PN (PAS)
N51	Pasir Panjang	Rosli Abd Rahman	PN (PAS)
N52	Pangkor	Norhaslinda Zakaria	PN (BERSATU)
N53	Rungkup	Shahrul Zaman Yahya	BN (UMNO)
N54	Hutan Melintang	Wasanthee Sinnasamy	PH (PKR)
N55	Pasir Bedamar	Woo Kah Leong	PH (DAP)
N56	Changkat Jong	Nadziruddin Mohamed Bandi	PN (BERSATU)
N57	Sungkai	Sivanesan Achalingam	PH (DAP)
N58	Slim	Muhammad Zulfadli Zainal	PN (PAS)
N59	Behrang	Salina Samsudin	BN (UMNO)

== Pahang ==
15th Pahang State Legislative Assembly
←	14th Assembly	16th Assembly	→

Overview
- Legislative body: Pahang State Legislative Assembly
- Jurisdiction: Pahang
- Meeting place: Wisma Seri Pahang, Kuantan
- Term: 29 December 2022 – Present
- Election: 2022 state election
- Government: Pahang State Executive Council
- Website: www.pahang.gov.my
- Members: 42
- Speaker: Mohd Sharkar Shamsudin
- Deputy Speaker: Lee Chin Chen
- Secretary: Syed Ahmad Khirulanwar Alyahya Syed Abdul Rahman
- Government Leader: Wan Rosdy Wan Ismail
- Opposition Leader: Tuan Ibrahim Tuan Man
- Party control: Barisan Nasional

Sovereign
- Sultan: Sultan Abdullah

Sessions
- 1st: 29 December 2022 – Present

No.	State Constituency	Member	Coalition (Party)
BN 19 | PN 17 | PH 10 | IND 1
N01	Tanah Rata	Ho Chi Yang	PH (DAP)
N02	Jelai	Wan Rosdy Wan Ismail	BN (UMNO)
N03	Padang Tengku	Mustapa Long	BN (UMNO)
N04	Cheka	Tuan Ibrahim Tuan Man	PN (PAS)
N05	Benta	Mohd. Soffi Abd. Razak	BN (UMNO)
N06	Batu Talam	Abd. Aziz Mat Kiram	BN (UMNO)
N07	Tras	Tengku Zulpuri Shah Raja Puji	PH (DAP)
N08	Dong	Fadzli Mohamad Kamal	BN (UMNO)
N09	Tahan	Mohd Zakhwan Ahmad Badarddin	PN (PAS)
N10	Damak	Zuridan Mohd Daud	PN (PAS)
N11	Pulau Tawar	Yohanis Ahmad	PN (PAS)
N12	Beserah	Andansura Rabu	PN (PAS)
N13	Semambu	Chan Chun Kuang	PH (PKR)
N14	Teruntum	Sim Chon Siang	PH (PKR)
N15	Tanjung Lumpur	Rosli Abdul Jabar	PN (PAS)
N16	Inderapura	Shafik Fauzan Sharif	BN (UMNO)
N17	Sungai Lembing	Mohamad Ayub Mat Ashri	PN (PAS)
N18	Lepar	Mohd Yazid Mohd Yunus	PN (BERSATU)
N19	Panching	Mohd Tarmizi Yahaya	PN (PAS)
N20	Pulau Manis	Mohammad Rafiq Khan Ahmad Khan	PN (PAS)
N21	Peramu Jaya	Mohamad Nizar Najib	BN (UMNO)
N22	Bebar	Mohd. Fakhruddin Mohd. Arif	BN (UMNO)
N23	Chini	Mohd Sharim Md Zain	BN (UMNO)
N24	Luit	Mohd Sofian Abd Jalil	PN (PAS)
N25	Kuala Sentul	Jasri Jamaludin	PN (BERSATU)
N26	Chenor	Mujjibur Rahman Ishak	PN (PAS)
N27	Jenderak	Rodzuan Zaaba	BN (UMNO)
N28	Kerdau	Syed Ibrahim Syed Ahmad	BN (UMNO)
N29	Jengka	Shahril Azman Abd Halim	PN (PAS)
N30	Mentakab	Woo Chee Wan	PH (DAP)
N31	Lanchang	Hassan Omar	PN (PAS)
N32	Kuala Semantan	Hassanuddin Salim	PN (PAS)
N33	Bilut	Lee Chin Chen	PH (DAP)
N34	Ketari	Su Keong Siong	PH (DAP)
N35	Sabai	Arumugam Veerappa Pillai	BN (MIC)
N36	Pelangai	Amizar Abu Adam since 7 October 2023 (Note: Amizar Abu Adam was elected a Barisan Nasional assemblyman after winning the by-election, following the death of assemblyman Johari Harun.)	BN (UMNO)
N36	Pelangai	Johari Harun until 17 August 2023	BN (UMNO)
N37	Guai	Sabariah Saidan	BN (UMNO)
N38	Triang	Leong Yu Man	PH (DAP)
N39	Kemayan	Khairulnizam Mohamad Zuldin	BN (UMNO)
N40	Bukit Ibam	Nazri Ahmad	PN (PAS)
N41	Muadzam Shah	Razali Kassim	BN (UMNO)
N42	Tioman	Mohd Johari Hussain (since 7 December 2023)	BN (UMNO)
—	Nominated member	Haris Salleh Hamzah	BN (UMNO)
—	Nominated member	Wong Tat Chee	BN (MCA)
—	Nominated member	Rizal Jamin	PH (PKR)
—	Nominated member	Mohd Fadzli Mohd Ramly	PH (AMANAH)
—	Nominated member	Ahmad Irshadi Abdullah	IND

== Selangor ==
15th Selangor State Legislative Assembly
←	14th Assembly	16th Assembly	→

Overview
- Legislative body: Selangor State Legislative Assembly
- Jurisdiction: Selangor
- Meeting place: Bangunan Sultan Salahuddin Abdul Aziz Shah
- Term: 19 September 2023 – present
- Election: 2023 state election
- Government: Selangor State Executive Council
- Website: dewan.selangor.gov.my
- Members: 56
- Speaker: Lau Weng San
- Deputy Speaker: Mohd Kamri Kamaruddin
- Secretary: Mohd. Khairul Ashraff Razali
- Government Leader: Amirudin Shari
- Opposition Leader: Azmin Ali
- Party control: Pakatan Harapan

Sovereign
- Sultan: Sultan Sharafuddin Idris Shah

Sessions
- 1st: 19 September 2023 – present

No.	State Constituency	Member	Coalition (Party)
PH 32 | PN 21 | BN 2 | IND 1
N01	Sungai Air Tawar	Rizam Ismail	BN (UMNO)
N02	Sabak	Sallehen Mukhyi	PN (PAS)
N03	Sungai Panjang	Mohd Razali Saari	PN (PAS)
N04	Sekinchan	Ng Suee Lim	PH (DAP)
N05	Hulu Bernam	Mui'zzuddeen Mahyuddin	PN (PAS)
N06	Kuala Kubu Baharu	Pang Sock Tao from 11 May 2024 (Note: Pang was elected to State Legislative Assembly in the Kuala Kubu Baharu by-election, 2024 following the death of Lee Kee Hiong.)	PH (DAP)
N06	Kuala Kubu Baharu	Lee Kee Hiong until 21 March 2024	PH (DAP)
N07	Batang Kali	Muhammad Muhaimin Harith Abdullah Sani	PN (BERSATU)
N08	Sungai Burong	Mohd Zamri Mohd Zainuldin	PN (PAS)
N09	Permatang	Nurul Syazwani Noh	PN (BERSATU)
N10	Bukit Melawati	Noorazley Yahya	PN (BERSATU)
N11	Ijok	Jefri Mejan	PN (PAS)
N12	Jeram	Harrison Hassan	PN (BERSATU)
N13	Kuang	Mohd Rafiq Mohd Abdullah	PN (BERSATU)
N14	Rawang	Chua Wei Kiat	PH (PKR)
N15	Taman Templer	Anfaal Saari	PH (AMANAH)
N16	Sungai Tua	Amirudin Shari	PH (PKR)
N17	Gombak Setia	Muhammad Hilman Idham	PN (BERSATU)
N18	Hulu Kelang	Mohamed Azmin Ali	PN (BERSATU)
N19	Bukit Antarabangsa	Mohd Kamri Kamaruddin	PH (PKR)
N20	Lembah Jaya	Syed Ahmad Syed Abdul Rahman Alhadad	PH (PKR)
N21	Pandan Indah	Izham Hashim	PH (AMANAH)
N22	Teratai	Yew Jia Haur	PH (DAP)
N23	Dusun Tua	Johan Abd Aziz	BN (UMNO)
N24	Semenyih	Nushi Mahfodz	PN (PAS)
N25	Kajang	David Cheong Kian Young	PH (PKR)
N26	Sungai Ramal	Mohd Shafie Ngah	PN (PAS)
N27	Balakong	Wayne Ong Chun Wei	PH (DAP)
N28	Seri Kembangan	Wong Siew Ki	PH (DAP)
N29	Seri Serdang	Abbas Salimi Azmi	PH (AMANAH)
N30	Kinrara	Ng Sze Han	PH (DAP)
N31	Subang Jaya	Michelle Ng Mei Sze	PH (DAP)
N32	Seri Setia	Mohammad Fahmi Ngah	PH (PKR)
N33	Taman Medan	Afif Bahardin	PN (BERSATU)
N34	Bukit Gasing	Rajiv Rishyakaran	PH (DAP)
N35	Kampung Tunku	Lim Yi Wei	PH (DAP)
N36	Bandar Utama	Jamaliah Jamaluddin	PH (DAP)
N37	Bukit Lanjan	Pua Pei Ling	PH (PKR)
N38	Paya Jaras	Ab Halim Tamuri	PN (PAS)
N39	Kota Damansara	Muhammad Izuan Ahmad Kasim	PH (PKR)
N40	Kota Anggerik	Najwan Halimi	PH (PKR)
N41	Batu Tiga	Danial Al Rashid Haron Aminar Rashid	PH (AMANAH)
N42	Meru	Mariam Abdul Rashid	PH (AMANAH)
N43	Sementa	Noor Najhan Mohamad Salleh	PN (PAS)
N44	Selat Klang	Abdul Rashid Asari	IND
N45	Bandar Baru Klang	Quah Perng Fei	PH (DAP)
N46	Pelabuhan Klang	Azmizam Zaman Huri	PH (PKR)
N47	Pandamaran	Leong Tuck Chee	PH (DAP)
N48	Sentosa	Gunarajah George	PH (PKR)
N49	Sungai Kandis	Wan Dzahanurin Ahmad	PN (BERSATU)
N50	Kota Kemuning	Preakas Sampunathan	PH (DAP)
N51	Sijangkang	Ahmad Yunus Hairi	PN (PAS)
N52	Banting	Papparaidu Veraman	PH (DAP)
N53	Morib	Rosnizan Ahmad	PN (BERSATU)
N54	Tanjong Sepat	Borhan Aman Shah	PH (PKR)
N55	Dengkil	Jamil Salleh	PN (BERSATU)
N56	Sungai Pelek	Lwi Kian Keong	PH (DAP)

== Negeri Sembilan ==
=== 2023–2026 ===
15th Negeri Sembilan State Legislative Assembly
←	14th Assembly	16th Assembly	→

Overview
- Legislative body: Negeri Sembilan State Legislative Assembly
- Jurisdiction: Negeri Sembilan
- Meeting place: Wisma Negeri, Negeri Sembilan
- Term: 26 September 2023 – 5 June 2026
- Election: 2023 state election
- Government: Negeri Sembilan State Executive Council
- Website: www.ns.gov.my
- Members: 36
- Speaker: Mk Ibrahim Abdul Rahman
- Deputy Speaker: Mohd Asna Amin
- Secretary: Mohd Amin Ludin
- Government Leader: Aminuddin Harun
- Opposition Leader: Ridzuan Ahmad
- Party control: Pakatan Harapan - Barisan Nasional

Sovereign
- Yang di-Pertuan Besar: Tuanku Muhriz

Sessions
- 1st: 26 September 2023 – 5 June 2026

No.	State Constituency	Member	Coalition (Party)
PH 17 | BN 14 | PN 5
N01	Chennah	Anthony Loke Siew Fook	PH (DAP)
N02	Pertang	Jalaluddin Alias	BN (UMNO)
N03	Sungai Lui	Mohd Razi Mohd Ali	BN (UMNO)
N04	Klawang	Bakri Sawir	PH (AMANAH)
N05	Serting	Mohd Fairuz Mohd Isa	PN (PAS)
N06	Palong	Mustapha Nagoor	BN (UMNO)
N07	Jeram Padang	Mohd Zaidy Abdul Kadir	BN (UMNO)
N08	Bahau	Teo Kok Seong	PH (DAP)
N09	Lenggeng	Mohd Asna Amin	BN (UMNO)
N10	Nilai	Arul Kumar Jambunathan	PH (DAP)
N11	Lobak	Chew Seh Yong	PH (DAP)
N12	Temiang	Ng Chin Tsai	PH (DAP)
N13	Sikamat	Aminuddin Harun	PH (PKR)
N14	Ampangan	Tengku Zamrah Tengku Sulaiman	PH (PKR)
N15	Juasseh	Bibi Sharliza Mohd Khalid	BN (UMNO)
N16	Seri Menanti	Muhammad Sufian Maradzi	BN (UMNO)
N17	Senaling	Ismail Lasim	BN (UMNO)
N18	Pilah	Noorzunita Begum Mohd Ibrahim	PH (PKR)
N19	Johol	Saiful Yazan Sulaiman	BN (UMNO)
N20	Labu	Mohamad Hanifah Abu Baker	PN (BERSATU)
N21	Bukit Kepayang	Nicole Tan Lee Koon	PH (DAP)
N22	Rahang	Siau Meow Kong	PH (DAP)
N23	Mambau	Yap Yew Weng	PH (DAP)
N24	Seremban Jaya	Gunasekaren Palasamy	PH (DAP)
N25	Paroi	Kamarol Ridzuan Mohd Zain	PN (PAS)
N26	Chembong	Zaifulbahri Idris	BN (UMNO)
N27	Rantau	Mohamad Hasan	BN (UMNO)
N28	Kota	Suhaimi Aini	BN (UMNO)
N29	Chuah	Yew Boon Lye	PH (PKR)
N30	Lukut	Choo Ken Hwa	PH (DAP)
N31	Bagan Pinang	Abdul Fatah Zakaria	PN (PAS)
N32	Linggi	Mohd Faizal Ramli	BN (UMNO)
N33	Sri Tanjung	Rajasekaran Gunnasekaran	PH (PKR)
N34	Gemas	Ridzuan Ahmad	PN (BERSATU)
N35	Gemencheh	Suhaimizan Bizar	BN (UMNO)
N36	Repah	Veerapan Superamaniam	PH (DAP)

=== Since 2026 ===
16th Negeri Sembilan State Legislative Assembly
←	15th Assembly	16th Assembly	→

Overview
- Legislative body: Negeri Sembilan State Legislative Assembly
- Jurisdiction: Negeri Sembilan
- Meeting place: Wisma Negeri, Negeri Sembilan
- Term: 18 August 2026 –
- Election: 2026 state election
- Government: Negeri Sembilan State Executive Council
- Website: www.ns.gov.my
- Members: 36
- Speaker: Awaludin Said
- Deputy Speaker: Kamarol Ridzuan Mohd Zain
- Secretary: Mohd Amin Ludin
- Government Leader: Ismail Lasim
- Opposition Leader: Arul Kumar Jambunathan
- Party control: Barisan Nasional - Perikatan Nasional

Sovereign
- Yang di-Pertuan Besar: Tuanku Muhriz

Sessions
- 1st: 1 August 2026 –

No.	State Constituency	Member	Coalition (Party)
BN 18 | PH 11 | PN 7
N01	Chennah	Siow Kong Choon	BN (MCA)
N02	Pertang	Jalaluddin Alias	BN (UMNO)
N03	Sungai Lui	Mohd Razi Mohd Ali	BN (UMNO)
N04	Klawang	Danni Rais	PN (WAWASAN)
N05	Serting	Mohd Fairuz Mohd Isa	PN (PAS)
N06	Palong	Mustapha Nagoor	BN (UMNO)
N07	Jeram Padang	Mohd Zaidy Abdul Kadir	BN (UMNO)
N08	Bahau	Teo Kok Seong	PH (DAP)
N09	Lenggeng	Mohd Asna Amin	BN (UMNO)
N10	Nilai	Arul Kumar Jambunathan	PH (DAP)
N11	Lobak	Chew Seh Yong	PH (DAP)
N12	Temiang	Ho Weng Wah	PH (DAP)
N13	Sikamat	Razali Abu Samah	PN (WAWASAN)
N14	Ampangan	Mohamad Rafie Abdul Malek	PN (PAS)
N15	Juasseh	Ismail Lasim	BN (UMNO)
N16	Seri Menanti	Muhammad Sufian Maradzi	BN (UMNO)
N17	Senaling	Mohamad Qayyum Abd Jalil	BN (UMNO)
N18	Pilah	S Leza Md Yasin	BN (UMNO)
N19	Johol	Saiful Yazan Sulaiman	BN (UMNO)
N20	Labu	Siti Nur Umaira Hasim	BN (UMNO)
N21	Bukit Kepayang	Nicole Tan Lee Koon	PH (DAP)
N22	Rahang	Siau Meow Kong	PH (DAP)
N23	Mambau	Lee Kai Yet	PH (DAP)
N24	Seremban Jaya	Mugunthan Subramanian	PH (DAP)
N25	Paroi	Kamarol Ridzuan Mohd Zain	PN (PAS)
N26	Chembong	Zaifulbahri Idris	BN (UMNO)
N27	Rantau	Mohamad Hasan	BN (UMNO)
N28	Kota	Suhaimi Aini	BN (UMNO)
N29	Chuah	Yew Boon Lye	PH (PKR)
N30	Lukut	Choo Ken Hwa	PH (DAP)
N31	Bagan Pinang	Abdul Fatah Zakaria	PN (PAS)
N32	Linggi	Mohd Faizal Ramli	BN (UMNO)
N33	Sri Tanjung	Rajasekaran Gunnasekaran	PH (PKR)
N34	Gemas	Ridzuan Ahmad	PN (WAWASAN)
N35	Gemencheh	Suhaimizan Bizar	BN (UMNO)
N36	Repah	Koh Kim Swee	BN (MCA)

== Malacca ==
=== 2023–2026 ===
15th Malacca State Legislative Assembly
←	14th Assembly	16th Assembly	→

Overview
- Legislative body: Malacca State Legislative Assembly
- Jurisdiction: Malacca
- Meeting place: Seri Negeri Complex
- Term: 27 December 2021 – 23 September 2026
- Election: 2021 state election
- Government: Malacca State Executive Council
- Website: www.melaka.gov.my
- Members: 28
- Speaker: Ibrahim Durum
- Deputy Speaker: Kerk Chee Yee
- Secretary: Kamel Mohamad
- Government Leader: Ab Rauf Yusoh
- Opposition Leader: Mohd Yadzil Yaakub
- Party control: Barisan Nasional

Sovereign
- Yang di-Pertua Negeri: Mohd Ali Rustam

Sessions
- 1st: 27 December 2021 – 23 September 2026

No.	State Constituency	Member	Coalition (Party)
BN 20 | PH 5 | PN 3
N01	Kuala Linggi	Rosli Abdullah	BN (UMNO)
N02	Tanjung Bidara	Ab Rauf Yusoh	BN (UMNO)
N03	Ayer Limau	Hameed Mytheen Kunju Basheer	BN (UMNO)
N04	Lendu	Sulaiman Md Ali	BN (UMNO)
N05	Taboh Naning	Zulkiflee Mohd Zin	BN (UMNO)
N06	Rembia	Muhammad Jailani Khamis (Note: Muhamad Jailani Khamis was elected as a Barisan Nasional assemblyman in the state election in 2021, resigned from UMNO in July 2024 and became member of PAS.)	PN (PAS)
N07	Gadek	Shanmugam Ptcyhay	BN (MIC)
N08	Machap Jaya	Ngwe Hee Sem	BN (MCA)
N09	Durian Tunggal	Zahari Abd Khalil	BN (UMNO)
N10	Asahan	Fairul Nizam Roslan	BN (UMNO)
N11	Sungai Udang	Mohd Aleef Yusof	PN (BERSATU)
N12	Pantai Kundor	Tuminah Kadi	BN (UMNO)
N13	Paya Rumput	Rais Yasin	BN (UMNO)
N14	Kelebang	Lim Ban Hong	BN (MCA)
N15	Pengkalan Batu	Kalsom Noordin	BN (UMNO)
N16	Ayer Keroh	Kerk Chee Yee	PH (DAP)
N17	Bukit Katil	Adly Zahari	PH (AMANAH)
N18	Ayer Molek	Rahmad Mariman	BN (UMNO)
N19	Kesidang	Allex Seah Shoo Chin	PH (DAP)
N20	Kota Laksamana	Low Chee Leong	PH (DAP)
N21	Duyong	Mohd Noor Helmy Abdul Halem	BN (UMNO)
N22	Bandar Hilir	Leng Chau Yen	PH (DAP)
N23	Telok Mas	Abdul Razak Abdul Rahman	BN (UMNO)
N24	Bemban	Mohd Yadzil Yaakub (Note: On 13 February 2026, Mohd Yadzil had his party membership terminated and thus became an independent.)	PN (WAWASAN)
N25	Rim	Khaidiriah Abu Zahar	BN (UMNO)
N26	Serkam	Zaidi Attan	BN (UMNO)
N27	Merlimau	Muhamad Akmal Saleh	BN (UMNO)
N28	Sungai Rambai	Siti Faizah Abdul Azis	BN (UMNO)

=== 2026–present ===
16th Malacca State Legislative Assembly
←	15th Assembly	17th Assembly	→

Overview
- Legislative body: Malacca State Legislative Assembly
- Jurisdiction: Malacca
- Meeting place: Seri Negeri Complex
- Term: TBD –
- Election: 2026 state election
- Government: Malacca State Executive Council
- Website: www.melaka.gov.my
- Members: 28
- Speaker: TBD
- Deputy Speaker: TBD
- Secretary: Kamel Mohamad
- Government Leader: Ab Rauf Yusoh
- Opposition Leader: TBD
- Party control: Barisan Nasional

Sovereign
- Yang di-Pertua Negeri: Mohd Ali Rustam

Sessions
- 1st: TBD –

No.	State Constituency	Member	Coalition (Party)
BN 21 | PH 4 | PN 3
N01	Kuala Linggi	Rosli Abdullah	BN (UMNO)
N02	Tanjung Bidara	Ab Rauf Yusoh	BN (UMNO)
N03	Ayer Limau	Hameed Mytheen Kunju Basheer	BN (UMNO)
N04	Lendu	Abdul Hakim Abdul Wahid	BN (UMNO)
N05	Taboh Naning	Zulkiflee Mohd Zin	BN (UMNO)
N06	Rembia	Ahmad Norazril Abd Aziz	BN (UMNO)
N07	Gadek	Nadarajah Sellappa	BN (MIC)
N08	Machap Jaya	Ngwe Hee Sem	BN (MCA)
N09	Durian Tunggal	Mustafa Musa	BN (UMNO)
N10	Asahan	Fairul Nizam Roslan	BN (UMNO)
N11	Sungai Udang	Rais Yasin	BN (UMNO)
N12	Pantai Kundor	Tuminah Kadi	BN (UMNO)
N13	Paya Rumput	Rafie Ahmad	PN (PAS)
N14	Kelebang	Lim Ban Hong	BN (MCA)
N15	Pengkalan Batu	Siti Aisyah Mahmood	BN (UMNO)
N16	Ayer Keroh	Kerk Chee Yee	PH (DAP)
N17	Bukit Katil	Ridzuan Sarif	PN (PAS)
N18	Ayer Molek	Mohd Ridhwan Mohd Ali	BN (UMNO)
N19	Kesidang	Allex Seah Shoo Chin	PH (DAP)
N20	Kota Laksamana	Low Chee Leong	PH (DAP)
N21	Duyong	Mohd Noor Helmy	BN (UMNO)
N22	Bandar Hilir	Leng Chau Yen	PH (DAP)
N23	Telok Mas	Abdul Razak Abdul Rahman	BN (UMNO)
N24	Bemban	Mohd Yadzil Yaakub	PN (WAWASAN)
N25	Rim	Khaidirah Abu Zahar	BN (UMNO)
N26	Serkam	Azman Abdullah	BN (UMNO)
N27	Merlimau	Muhamad Akmal Saleh	BN (UMNO)
N28	Sungai Rambai	Jezlee Pit	BN (UMNO)

== Johor ==
=== 2023-2026 ===
15th Johor State Legislative Assembly
←	14th Assembly	16th Assembly	→

Overview
- Legislative body: Johor State Legislative Assembly
- Jurisdiction: Johor
- Meeting place: Sultan Ismail Building
- Term: 21 April 2022 – 1 June 2026
- Election: 2022 state election
- Government: Johor State Executive Council
- Website: www.johor.gov.my
- Members: 56
- Speaker: Mohd Puad Zarkashi
- Deputy Speaker: Samsolbari Jamali
- Secretary: Shubanah Yusuf
- Government Leader: Onn Hafiz Ghazi
- Opposition Leader: Andrew Chen Kah Eng
- Party control: Barisan Nasional

Sovereign
- Sultan: Sultan Ibrahim

Sessions
- 1st: 21 April 2022 – 1 June 2026

No.	State Constituency	Member	Coalition (Party)
BN 40 | PH 12 | PN 3 | MUDA 1
N01	Buloh Kasap	Zahari Sarip	BN (UMNO)
N02	Jementah	Ng Kor Sim	PH (DAP)
N03	Pemanis	Anuar Abdul Manap	BN (UMNO)
N04	Kemelah	Saraswathy Nallathamby	BN (MIC)
N05	Tenang	Haslinda Salleh	BN (UMNO)
N06	Bekok	Tan Chong	BN (MCA)
N07	Bukit Kepong	Sahruddin Jamal	PN (BERSATU)
N08	Bukit Pasir	Mohamad Fazli Mohamad Salleh	BN (UMNO)
N09	Gambir	Sahrihan Jani	BN (UMNO)
N10	Tangkak	Ee Chin Li	PH (DAP)
N11	Serom	Khairin Nisa Ismail	BN (UMNO)
N12	Bentayan	Ng Yak Howe	PH (DAP)
N13	Simpang Jeram	Nazri Abdul Rahman since 9 September 2023	PH (AMANAH)
N13	Simpang Jeram	Salahuddin Ayub until 23 July 2023	PH (AMANAH)
N14	Bukit Naning	Fuad Tukirin	BN (UMNO)
N15	Maharani	Abdul Aziz Talib	PN (PAS)
N16	Sungai Balang	Selamat Takim	BN (UMNO)
N17	Semerah	Mohd Fared Mohd Khalid	BN (UMNO)
N18	Sri Medan	Zulkurnain Kamisan	BN (UMNO)
N19	Yong Peng	Ling Tian Soon	BN (MCA)
N20	Semarang	Samsolbari Jamali	BN (UMNO)
N21	Parit Yaani	Mohamad Najib Samuri	BN (UMNO)
N22	Parit Raja	Nor Rashidah Ramli	BN (UMNO)
N23	Penggaram	Gan Peck Cheng	PH (DAP)
N24	Senggarang	Mohd Yusla Ismail	BN (UMNO)
N25	Rengit	Mohd Puad Zarkashi	BN (UMNO)
N26	Machap	Onn Hafiz Ghazi	BN (UMNO)
N27	Layang-Layang	Abd. Mutalip Abd. Rahim	BN (UMNO)
N28	Mengkibol	Chew Chong Sin	PH (DAP)
N29	Mahkota	Syed Hussien Syed Abdullah since 28 September 2024	BN (UMNO)
N29	Mahkota	Sharifah Azizah Syed Zain until 2 August 2024	BN (UMNO)
N30	Paloh	Lee Ting Han	BN (MCA)
N31	Kahang	Vidyananthan Ramanadhan	BN (MIC)
N32	Endau	Alwiyah Talib	PN (BERSATU)
N33	Tenggaroh	Raven Kumar Krishnasamy	BN (MIC)
N34	Panti	Hahasrin Hashim	BN (UMNO)
N35	Pasir Raja	Rashidah Ismail	BN (UMNO)
N36	Sedili	Muszaide Makmor	BN (UMNO)
N37	Johor Lama	Norlizah Noh	BN (UMNO)
N38	Penawar	Fauziah Misri	BN (UMNO)
N39	Tanjung Surat	Aznan Tamin	BN (UMNO)
N40	Tiram	Azizul Bachok	BN (UMNO)
N41	Puteri Wangsa	Amira Aisya Abdul Aziz	MUDA
N42	Johor Jaya	Liow Cai Tung	PH (DAP)
N43	Permas	Baharudin Mohamed Taib	BN (UMNO)
N44	Larkin	Mohd Hairi Mad Shah	BN (UMNO)
N45	Stulang	Andrew Chen Kah Eng	PH (DAP)
N46	Perling	Liew Chin Tong	PH (DAP)
N47	Kempas	Ramlee Bohani	BN (UMNO)
N48	Skudai	Marina Ibrahim	PH (DAP)
N49	Kota Iskandar	Pandak Ahmad	BN (UMNO)
N50	Bukit Permai	Mohd Jafni Md Shukor	BN (UMNO)
N51	Bukit Batu	Arthur Chiong Sen Sern	PH (PKR)
N52	Senai	Wong Bor Yang	PH (DAP)
N53	Benut	Hasni Mohammad	BN (UMNO)
N54	Pulai Sebatang	Hasrunizah Hassan	BN (UMNO)
N55	Pekan Nanas	Tan Eng Meng	BN (MCA)
N56	Kukup	Jefridin Atan	BN (UMNO)

=== Since 2026 ===
16th Johor State Legislative Assembly
←	15th Assembly	17th Assembly	→

Overview
- Legislative body: Johor State Legislative Assembly
- Jurisdiction: Johor
- Meeting place: Sultan Ismail Building
- Term: 27 August 2026 –
- Election: 2026 state election
- Government: Johor State Executive Council
- Website: www.johor.gov.my
- Members: 56
- Speaker: Zahari Sarip
- Deputy Speaker: Samsolbari Jamali
- Secretary: Shubanah Yusuf
- Government Leader: Onn Hafiz Ghazi
- Opposition Leader: Andrew Chen Kah Eng
- Party control: Barisan Nasional

Sovereign
- Sultan: Sultan Ibrahim

Sessions
- 1st: 27 August 2026 –

No.	State Constituency	Member	Coalition (Party)
BN 48 | PH 8
N1	Buloh Kasap	Zahari Sarip	BN (UMNO)
N2	Jementah	See Ann Giap	BN (MCA)
N3	Pemanis	Anuar Abdul Manap	BN (UMNO)
N4	Kemelah	Raven Kumar Krishnasamy	BN (MIC)
N5	Tenang	Mohd Azahar Ibrahim	BN (UMNO)
N6	Bekok	Tan Chong	BN (MCA)
N7	Bukit Kepong	Ahmad Syar'e Yusof	BN (UMNO)
N8	Bukit Pasir	Mohamad Fazli Salleh	BN (UMNO)
N9	Gambir	Sahrihan Jani	BN (UMNO)
N10	Tangkak	Haw Chin Teck	BN (MCA)
N11	Serom	Nadhirah Afiqah Abdul Rahim	BN (UMNO)
N12	Bentayan	Ng Yak Howe	PH (DAP)
N13	Simpang Jeram	Nazri Abdul Rahman	PH (AMANAH)
N14	Bukit Naning	Mohd Ghazali Sabari	BN (UMNO)
N15	Maharani	Ashari Md Sarip	BN (UMNO)
N16	Sungai Balang	Selamat Takim	BN (UMNO)
N17	Semerah	Mohd Fared Mohd Khalid	BN (UMNO)
N18	Sri Medan	Zulkurnain Kamisan	BN (UMNO)
N19	Yong Peng	Ling Tian Soon	BN (MCA)
N20	Semarang	Samsolbari Jamali	BN (UMNO)
N21	Parit Yaani	Mohamad Najib Samuri	BN (UMNO)
N22	Parit Raja	Nor Rashidah Ramli	BN (UMNO)
N23	Penggaram	Felicia Poh Rui Ling	PH (DAP)
N24	Senggarang	Mohd Yusla Ismail	BN (UMNO)
N25	Rengit	Zaidi Japar	BN (UMNO)
N26	Machap	Onn Hafiz Ghazi	BN (UMNO)
N27	Layang-Layang	Chua Jian Boon	BN (MCA)
N28	Mengkibol	Chu Poh Yee	PH (DAP)
N29	Mahkota	Syed Hussien Syed Abdullah	BN (UMNO)
N30	Paloh	Lee Ting Han	BN (MCA)
N31	Kahang	Rugendran Vellayan	BN (MIC)
N32	Endau	Alwiyah Talib	BN (UMNO)
N33	Tenggaroh	Mohd Youzaimi Yusof	BN (UMNO)
N34	Panti	Muhammad Naqib Md Ghazali	BN (UMNO)
N35	Pasir Raja	Adham Baba	BN (UMNO)
N36	Sedili	Muszaide Makmor	BN (UMNO)
N37	Johor Lama	Norlizah Noh	BN (UMNO)
N38	Penawar	Fauziah Misri	BN (UMNO)
N39	Tanjung Surat	Aznan Tamin	BN (UMNO)
N40	Tiram	Abdul Halim Suleiman	BN (UMNO)
N41	Puteri Wangsa	Maszlee Malik	PH (PKR)
N42	Johor Jaya	Chan San San	BN (MCA)
N43	Permas	Baharudin Mohamed Taib	BN (UMNO)
N44	Larkin	Mohd Hairi Mad Shah	BN (UMNO)
N45	Stulang	Andrew Chen Kah Eng	PH (DAP)
N46	Perling	Pannir Selvam Paliksina	BN (MIC)
N47	Kempas	Ramlee Bohani	BN (UMNO)
N48	Skudai	Kartiyaini Jeyapalan	PH (DAP)
N49	Kota Iskandar	Pandak Ahmad	BN (UMNO)
N50	Bukit Permai	Mohd Jafni Md Shukor	BN (UMNO)
N51	Bukit Batu	Kumaran Ramakrishnan	BN (MIC)
N52	Senai	Wong Bor Yang	PH (DAP)
N53	Benut	Mohd Sumali Reduan	BN (UMNO)
N54	Pulai Sebatang	Hasrunizah Hassan	BN (UMNO)
N55	Pekan Nanas	Tan Eng Meng	BN (MCA)
N56	Kukup	Md Israk Abdullah	BN (UMNO)

== Sabah ==
=== 2023–2025 ===
16th Sabah State Legislative Assembly
←	15th Assembly	17th Assembly	→

Overview
- Legislative body: Sabah State Legislative Assembly
- Jurisdiction: Sabah
- Meeting place: Sabah State Legislative Assembly Building
- Term: 9 October 2020 – 6 October 2025
- Election: 2020 state election
- Government: Hajiji I
- Website: www.sabah.gov.my/dun
- Members: 73 elected members 6 nominated members
- Speaker: Kadzim M Yahya
- Secretary: Bernard Joseph Dalinting
- Government Leader: Hajiji Noor
- Opposition Leader: Shafie Apdal
- Party control: Gabungan Rakyat Sabah

Sovereign
- Yang di-Pertua Negeri: Juhar Mahiruddin

Sessions
- 1st: 9 October 2020 – 6 October 2025

No.	State Constituency	Member	Coalition (Party)
GRS 35 | WARISAN 14 | BN 12 | PH 7 | KDM 1 | PN 1 | VAC 2
N01	Banggi	Mohammad Mohamarin	GRS (GAGASAN)
N02	Bengkoka	Harun Durabi	BN (UMNO)
N03	Pitas	Ruddy Awah	GRS (GAGASAN)
N04	Tanjong Kapor	Chong Chen Bin @ Ben Chong	GRS (GAGASAN)
N05	Matunggong	Julita Mojungki	GRS (PBS)
N06	Bandau	Wetrom Bahanda	KDM
N07	Tandek	Hendrus Anding	GRS (PBS)
N08	Pintasan	Fairuz Renddan	GRS (GAGASAN)
N09	Tempasuk	Mohd Arsad Bistari	GRS (GAGASAN)
N10	Usukan	Mohd. Salleh Mohd. Said	BN (UMNO)
N11	Kadamaian	Ewon Benedick	PH (UPKO)
N12	Sulaman	Hajiji Noor	GRS (GAGASAN)
N13	Pantai Dalit	Jasnih Daya	GRS (GAGASAN)
N14	Tamparuli	Jahid Jahim	GRS (PBS)
N15	Kiulu	Joniston Bangkuai	GRS (PBS)
N16	Karambunai	Yakub Khan	BN (UMNO)
N17	Darau	Azhar Matussin	WARISAN
N18	Inanam	Peto Galim	PH (PKR)
N19	Likas	Tan Lee Fatt	PH (DAP)
N20	Api-Api	Christina Liew Chin Jin	PH (PKR)
N21	Luyang	Ginger Phoong Jin Zhe	PH (DAP)
N22	Tanjung Aru	Wong Hong Jun @ Junz Wong	WARISAN
N23	Petagas	Awang Ahmad Sah Awang Sahari	GRS (GAGASAN)
N24	Tanjung Keramat	Shahelmey Yahya	BN (UMNO)
N25	Kapayan	Jannie Lasimbang	PH (DAP)
N26	Moyog	Darell Leiking	WARISAN
N27	Limbahau	Juil Nuatim	GRS
N28	Kawang	Ghulam Haidar Khan Bahadar	GRS (GAGASAN)
N29	Pantai Manis	Mohd. Tamin Zainal	BN (UMNO)
N30	Bongawan	Daud Yusof	WARISAN
N31	Membakut	Mohd. Arifin Mohd. Arif	GRS (GAGASAN)
N32	Klias	Isnin Aliasnih	GRS (GAGASAN)
N33	Kuala Penyu	Limus Jury	GRS (GAGASAN)
N34	Lumadan	Ruslan Muharam	GRS (PBS)
N35	Sindumin	Yusof Yacob	GRS (GAGASAN)
N36	Kundasang	Joachim Gunsalam	GRS (PBS)
N37	Karanaan	Masidi Manjun	GRS (GAGASAN)
N38	Paginatan	Abidin Madingkir	STAR
N39	Tambunan	Jeffrey Gapari Kitingan	STAR
N40	Bingkor	Robert Tawik	STAR
N41	Liawan	Annuar Ayub Aman	STAR
N42	Melalap	Vacant since 4 March 2025 (Note: Peter Anthony was elected as a WARISAN assemblyman in the state elections in 2020, formed the KDM in 2022, convicted in 4 March 2025, but his conviction did not necessitate a by-election.)	VAC
N42	Melalap	Peter Anthony until 4 March 2025	KDM
N43	Kemabong	Rubin Balang	GRS (GAGASAN)
N44	Tulid	Flovia Ng	STAR
N45	Sook	Ellron Alfred Angin	STAR
N46	Nabawan	Abdul Ghani Mohamed Yassin	GRS (GAGASAN)
N47	Telupid	Jonnybone Kurum	GRS (PBS)
N48	Sugut	James Ratib	GRS (GAGASAN)
N49	Labuk	Samad Jambri	GRS (GAGASAN)
N50	Gum-Gum	Arunarsin Taib	WARISAN
N51	Sungai Manila	Mokran Ingkat	BN (UMNO)
N52	Sungai Sibuga	Vacant since 19 January 2025 (Note: Mohamad Hamsan Awang Supain was elected as a Barisan Nasional assemblyman in the state elections in 2020, passed away on 19 January 2025, but his death did not necessitate a by-election.)	VAC
N52	Sungai Sibuga	Mohamad Hamsan Awang Supain until 19 January 2025	BN (UMNO)
N53	Sekong	Alias Sani	WARISAN
N54	Karamunting	George Hiew Vun Zin	GRS (GAGASAN)
N55	Elopura	Calvin Chong Ket Kiun	WARISAN
N56	Tanjong Papat	Frankie Poon Ming Fung	PH (DAP)
N57	Kuamut	Masiung Banah	GRS (GAGASAN)
N58	Lamag	Bung Moktar Radin	BN (UMNO)
N59	Sukau	Jafry Arifin	BN (UMNO)
N60	Tungku	Assaffal P. Alian	WARISAN
N61	Segama	Mohammadin Ketapi	BN (UMNO)
N62	Silam	Dumi Pg. Masdal	WARISAN
N63	Kunak	Norazlinah Arif	GRS (GAGASAN)
N64	Sulabayan	Jaujan Sambakong	WARISAN
N65	Senallang	Mohd. Shafie Apdal	WARISAN
N66	Bugaya	Jamil Hamzah since 19 November 2022 (Note: Jamil Hamzah was elected a WARISAN assemblyman after winning the by-election, following the death of assemblyman Manis Muka Mohd Darah.)	WARISAN
N66	Bugaya	Manis Muka Mohd Darah until 17 November 2020	WARISAN
N67	Balung	Hamid Awang	GRS (GAGASAN)
N68	Apas	Nizam Abu Bakar Titingan	GRS (GAGASAN)
N69	Sri Tanjong	Justin Wong Yung Bin	WARISAN
N70	Kukusan	Rina Jainal	GRS (PHRS)
N71	Tanjong Batu	Andi Muhammad Suryady Bandy	BN (UMNO)
N72	Merotai	Sarifuddin Hata	WARISAN
N73	Sebatik	Hassan A. Gani Pg. Amir	GRS (GAGASAN)
—	Nominated member	Raime Unggi	BN (UMNO)
—	Nominated member	Suhaimi Nasir	BN (UMNO)
—	Nominated member	Jaffari Waliam	GRS (GAGASAN)
—	Nominated member	Aliakbar Gulasan	PN (PAS)
—	Nominated member	Amisah Yassin	GRS (GAGASAN)
—	Nominated member	Yong Teck Lee	SAPP

=== Since 2025 ===
17th Sabah State Legislative Assembly
←	16th Assembly	18th Assembly	→

Overview
- Legislative body: Sabah State Legislative Assembly
- Jurisdiction: Sabah
- Meeting place: Sabah State Legislative Assembly Building
- Term: 11 December 2025 –
- Election: 2025 state election
- Website: www.sabah.gov.my/dun
- Members: 73 elected members
- Speaker: Kadzim M Yahya
- Secretary: Bernard Joseph Dalinting

Sovereign
- Yang di-Pertua Negeri: Musa Aman

Sessions
- 1st: 11 December 2025 –

No.	State Constituency	Member	Coalition (Party)
GRS 36 | WARISAN 25 | BN 6 | STAR 2 | PH 2 | KDM 1 | IND 6 | PN 1
N01	Banggi	Mohammad Mohamarin	GRS (GAGASAN)
N02	Bengkoka	Harun Durabi	BN (UMNO)
N03	Pitas	Ruddy Awah	GRS (GAGASAN)
N04	Tanjong Kapor	Chong Chen Bin @ Ben Chong	GRS (GAGASAN)
N05	Matunggong	Julita Mojungki	GRS (PBS)
N06	Bandau	Maijol Mahap	IND
N07	Tandek	Hendrus Anding	GRS (PBS)
N08	Pintasan	Fairuz Renddan	IND
N09	Tempasuk	Mohd Arsad Bistari	GRS (GAGASAN)
N10	Usukan	Isnaraissah Munirah Majilis	WARISAN
N11	Kadamaian	Ewon Benedick	GRS (UPKO)
N12	Sulaman	Hajiji Noor	GRS (GAGASAN)
N13	Pantai Dalit	Jasnih Daya	GRS (GAGASAN)
N14	Tamparuli	Wilfred Madius Tangau	GRS (UPKO)
N15	Kiulu	Joniston Bangkuai	GRS (PBS)
N16	Karambunai	Aliakbar Gulasan	PN (PAS)
N17	Darau	Azhar Matussin	WARISAN
N18	Inanam	Edna Jessica Majimbun	WARISAN
N19	Likas	Tham Yun Fook	WARISAN
N20	Api-Api	Loi Kok Liang	WARISAN
N21	Luyang	Samuel Wong Tshun Chuen	WARISAN
N22	Tanjung Aru	Wong Hong Jun @ Junz Wong	WARISAN
N23	Petagas	Awang Ahmad Sah Awang Sahari	IND
N24	Tanjung Keramat	Shah Alfie Yahya Ahmad Shah	GRS (GAGASAN)
N25	Kapayan	Chin Tek Ming	WARISAN
N26	Moyog	Donald Peter Mojuntin	GRS (UPKO)
N27	Limbahau	Juil Nuatim	GRS (PBS)
N28	Kawang	Ghulam Haidar Khan Bahadar	GRS (GAGASAN)
N29	Pantai Manis	Pg Saifuddin Pg Tahir Petra	GRS (GAGASAN)
N30	Bongawan	Daud Yusof	WARISAN
N31	Membakut	Mohd. Arifin Mohd. Arif	GRS (GAGASAN)
N32	Klias	Isnin Aliasnih	GRS (GAGASAN)
N33	Kuala Penyu	Limus Jury	GRS (GAGASAN)
N34	Lumadan	Ruslan Muharam	GRS (PBS)
N35	Sindumin	Yusri Pungut	WARISAN
N36	Kundasang	Joachim Gunsalam	GRS (PBS)
N37	Karanaan	Masidi Manjun	GRS (GAGASAN)
N38	Paginatan	Rusdin Riman	KDM
N39	Tambunan	Jeffrey Gapari Kitingan	STAR
N40	Bingkor	Mohd Ishak Ayub	STAR
N41	Liawan	Nik Mohd Nadzri Nik Zawawi	BN (UMNO)
N42	Melalap	Jamawi Ja'afar	PH (PKR)
N43	Kemabong	Rubin Balang	GRS (GAGASAN)
N44	Tulid	Jordan Jude Ellron	IND
N45	Sook	Arthur Joseph Kurup	BN (PBRS)
N46	Nabawan	Abdul Ghani Mohamed Yassin	GRS (GAGASAN)
N47	Telupid	Jonnybone Kurum	GRS (PBS)
N48	Sugut	James Ratib	GRS (GAGASAN)
N49	Labuk	Samad Jambri	GRS (GAGASAN)
N50	Gum-Gum	Arunarsin Taib	WARISAN
N51	Sungai Manila	Hazem Mubarak Musa	GRS (GAGASAN)
N52	Sungai Sibuga	Nurulalsah Hassan Alban	WARISAN
N53	Sekong	Alias Sani	WARISAN
N54	Karamunting	Alex Wong Tshun Khee	WARISAN
N55	Elopura	Calvin Chong Ket Kiun	WARISAN
N56	Tanjong Papat	Alex Thien Ching Qiang	WARISAN
N57	Kuamut	Masiung Banah	GRS (GAGASAN)
N58	Lamag	Mohd Ismail Ayob since 24 January 2026	BN (UMNO)
N58	Lamag	Bung Moktar Radin until 5 December 2025	BN (UMNO)
N59	Sukau	Jafry Arifin	BN (UMNO)
N60	Tungku	Assaffal P. Alian	WARISAN
N61	Segama	Muhammad Abdul Karim	WARISAN
N62	Silam	Yusof Apdal	WARISAN
N63	Kunak	Anil Jeet Singh	BN (UMNO)
N64	Sulabayan	Jaujan Sambakong	WARISAN
N65	Senallang	Mohd. Shafie Apdal	WARISAN
N66	Bugaya	Jamil Hamzah	WARISAN
N67	Balung	Syed Ahmad Syed Abas	GRS (GAGASAN)
N68	Apas	Nizam Abu Bakar Titingan	GRS (GAGASAN)
N69	Sri Tanjong	Justin Wong Yung Bin	WARISAN
N70	Kukusan	Rina Jainal	IND
N71	Tanjong Batu	Andi Muhammad Shamsureezal Mohd Sainal	GRS (GAGASAN)
N72	Merotai	Sarifuddin Hata	WARISAN
N73	Sebatik	Manahing Tinggilani	WARISAN
—	Nominated Member	Ceasar Mandela Malakun	GRS (GAGASAN)
—	Nominated Member	Razali Razi	GRS (GAGASAN)
—	Nominated Member	Abdul Kassim Razali	GRS (GAGASAN)
—	Nominated Member	Chin Shu Ying	GRS (LDP)
—	Nominated Member	Grace Lee Li Mei	PH (PKR)
—	Nominated Member	Roger Chin Ken Fong	IND

== Sarawak ==
=== 2023–2026 ===
19th Sarawak State Legislative Assembly
←	18th Assembly	20th Assembly	→

Overview
- Legislative body: Sarawak State Legislative Assembly
- Jurisdiction: Sarawak
- Meeting place: New Sarawak State Legislative Assembly Building
- Term: 14 February 2022 – 26 October 2026
- Election: 2021 state election
- Government: Cabinet of Sarawak
- Website: www.dun.sarawak.gov.my
- Members: 82
- Speaker: Mohamad Asfia Awang Nasar
- Deputy Speaker: Idris Buang
- Secretary: Semawi Mohamad
- Government Leader: Abang Abdul Rahman Zohari Abang Openg
- Opposition Leader: Wong Soon Koh
- Party control: Gabungan Parti Sarawak

Sovereign
- Yang di-Pertua Negeri: Abdul Taib Mahmud

Sessions
- 1st: 14 February 2022 – 26 October 2026

No.	State Constituency	Member	Coalition (Party)
GPS 79 | PH 2 | IND 1
N01	Opar	Billy Sujang	GPS (SUPP)
N02	Tasik Biru	Henry Harry Jinep	GPS (PDP)
N03	Tanjong Datu	Azizul Annuar Adenan	GPS (PBB)
N04	Pantai Damai	Abdul Rahman Junaidi	GPS (PBB)
N05	Demak Laut	Hazland Abang Hipni	GPS (PBB)
N06	Tupong	Fazzrudin Abdul Rahman	GPS (PBB)
N07	Samariang	Sharifah Hasidah Sayeed Aman Ghazali	GPS (PBB)
N08	Satok	Ibrahim Baki	GPS (PBB)
N09	Padungan	Chong Chieng Jen	PH (DAP)
N10	Pending	Violet Yong Wui Wui	PH (DAP)
N11	Batu Lintang	See Chee How	IND
N12	Kota Sentosa	Yap Yau Sin	GPS (SUPP)
N13	Batu Kitang	Lo Khere Chiang	GPS (SUPP)
N14	Batu Kawah	Sim Kui Hian	GPS (SUPP)
N15	Asajaya	Abdul Karim Rahman Hamzah	GPS (PBB)
N16	Muara Tuang	Idris Buang	GPS (PBB)
N17	Stakan	Hamzah Brahim	GPS (PBB)
N18	Serembu	Miro Simuh	GPS (PBB)
N19	Mambong	Jerip Susil	GPS (PBB)
N20	Tarat	Roland Sagah Wee Inn	GPS (PBB)
N21	Tebedu	Simon Sinang Bada	GPS (PBB)
N22	Kedup	Martin Ben	GPS (PBB)
N23	Bukit Semuja	John Ilus	GPS (PBB)
N24	Sadong Jaya	Aidel Lariwoo	GPS (PBB)
N25	Simunjan	Awla Dris	GPS (PBB)
N26	Gedong	Abang Abdul Rahman Zohari Abang Openg	GPS (PBB)
N27	Sebuyau	Julaihi Narawi	GPS (PBB)
N28	Lingga	Dayang Noorazah Awang Sohor	GPS (PBB)
N29	Beting Maro	Razaili Gapor	GPS (PBB)
N30	Balai Ringin	Snowdan Lawan	GPS (PRS)
N31	Bukit Begunan	Mong Dagang	GPS (PRS)
N32	Simanggang	Francis Harden Hollis	GPS (SUPP)
N33	Engkilili	Johnical Rayong Ngipa	GPS (PDP)
N34	Batang Ai	Malcom Mussen Lamoh	GPS (PRS)
N35	Saribas	Mohammad Razi Sitam	GPS (PBB)
N36	Layar	Gerald Rentap Jabu	GPS (PBB)
N37	Bukit Saban	Douglas Uggah Embas	GPS (PBB)
N38	Kalaka	Mohamad Duri	GPS (PBB)
N39	Krian	Friday Belik	GPS (PDP)
N40	Kabong	Mohd Chee Kadir	GPS (PBB)
N41	Kuala Rajang	Len Talif Salleh	GPS (PBB)
N42	Semop	Abdullah Saidol	GPS (PBB)
N43	Daro	Safiee Ahmad	GPS (PBB)
N44	Jemoreng	Juanda Jaya	GPS (PBB)
N45	Repok	Huang Tiong Sii	GPS (SUPP)
N46	Meradong	Ding Kuong Hiing	GPS (SUPP)
N47	Pakan	William Mawan Ikom	GPS (PBB)
N48	Meluan	Rolland Duat Jubin	GPS (PDP)
N49	Ngemah	Anyi Jana	GPS (PRS)
N50	Machan	Allan Siden Gramong	GPS (PBB)
N51	Bukit Assek	Joseph Chieng Jin Ek	GPS (SUPP)
N52	Dudong	Tiong King Sing	GPS (PDP)
N53	Bawang Assan	Wong Soon Koh	GPS (PDP)
N54	Pelawan	Michael Tiang Ming Tee	GPS (SUPP)
N55	Nangka	Annuar Rapaee	GPS (PBB)
N56	Dalat	Fatimah Abdullah @ Ting Sai Ming	GPS (PBB)
N57	Tellian	Royston Valentine	GPS (PBB)
N58	Balingian	Abdul Yakub Arbi	GPS (PBB)
N59	Tamin	Christopher Gira Sambang	GPS (PRS)
N60	Kakus	John Sikie Tayai	GPS (PRS)
N61	Pelagus	Wilson Nyabong Ijang	GPS (PRS)
N62	Katibas	Lidam Assan	GPS (PBB)
N63	Bukit Goram	Jefferson Jamit Unyat	GPS (PBB)
N64	Baleh	Nicholas Kudi Jantai Masing	GPS (PRS)
N65	Belaga	Liwan Lagang	GPS (PRS)
N66	Murum	Kennedy Chukpai Ugon	GPS (PRS)
N67	Jepak	Iskandar Turkee since 4 November 2023	GPS (PBB)
N67	Jepak	Talib Zulpilip until 15 September 2023	GPS (PBB)
N68	Tanjong Batu	Johnny Pang Leong Ming	GPS (SUPP)
N69	Kemena	Stephen Rundi Utom	GPS (PBB)
N70	Samalaju	Majang Renggi	GPS (PRS)
N71	Bekenu	Rosey Yunus	GPS (PBB)
N72	Lambir	Ripin Lamat	GPS (PBB)
N73	Piasau	Sebastian Ting Chiew Yew	GPS (SUPP)
N74	Pujut	Adam Yii Siew Sang	GPS (SUPP)
N75	Senadin	Lee Kim Shin	GPS (SUPP)
N76	Marudi	Penguang Manggil	GPS (PDP)
N77	Telang Usan	Dennis Ngau	GPS (PBB)
N78	Mulu	Gerawat Gala	GPS (PBB)
N79	Bukit Kota	Abdul Rahman Ismail	GPS (PBB)
N80	Batu Danau	Paulus Palu Gumbang	GPS (PBB)
N81	Ba'kelalan	Baru Bian	GPS (PDP)
N82	Bukit Sari	Awang Tengah Ali Hasan	GPS (PBB)

== See also ==
- Members of the Dewan Rakyat, 15th Malaysian Parliament
