= Government of Kelantan =

Executive and legislative authorities governing the Malaysian state of Kelantan

State Government of Kelantan
- Kerajaan Negeri Kelantan
- State government

Overview
- Established: 31 August 1957; 69 years ago as a Malaysian state
- State: Kelantan
- Leader: Menteri Besar
- Appointed by: Sultan
- Main organ: Kelantan State Executive Council
- Responsible to: Kelantan State Legislative Assembly
- Annual budget: RM 1.38 Billion (2027)
- Headquarters: Kota Darul Naim, Kota Bharu
- Website: www.kelantan.gov.my

The Government of Kelantan, officially the State Government of Kelantan, refers to the government authority of the Malaysian state of Kelantan. The state government adheres to and is created by both the Federal Constitution of Malaysia, the supreme law of Malaysia, and the Laws of the Constitution of Kelantan, the supreme law in Kelantan. The government of Kelantan is based in Kota Bahru, the state's capital city.

The state government consists of only two branches – executive and legislative. The Kelantan State Executive Council forms the executive branch, whilst the Kelantan State Legislative Assembly is the legislature of the state government. Kelantan's head of government is the Menteri Besar. The state government does not have a judiciary branch, as Malaysia's judicial system is a federalised system operating uniformly throughout the country.

== Executive ==
=== Head of government ===
The Menteri Besar is the head of government in Kelantan. He is officially appointed by the Sultan, Kelantan's head of state, on the basis of the latter's judgement that the former commands the confidence of the majority of the State Assemblymen in the Kelantan State Legislative Assembly. The Menteri Besar and his Executive Council shall be collectively responsible to Legislative Assembly. The Office of the Menteri Besar is situated at 1st Floor, Mabna MBI Block 1 Building, Kota Darul Naim in Kota Bharu.

The Menteri Besar of Kelantan is Mohd Nassuruddin Daud of the Perikatan Nasional (PN) coalition. Mohd Nassuruddin assumed office on 15 August 2023, having been elected as a Member of the State Legislative Assembly since the 1995 Kelantan state election.

=== Cabinet ===
The Kelantan State Executive Council forms the executive branch of the Kelantan state government and is analogous in function to the Malaysian federal Cabinet. The Executive Council is led by the Menteri Besar and made up of between four and 10 other State Assemblymen from the Kelantan State Legislative Assembly. Aside from these, three other ex officio members of the Executive Council are the State Secretary, the State Legal Adviser and the State Financial Officer.

Following the 2023 Kelantan state election, Mohd Nassuruddin Daud was appointed as the Menteri Besar after Perikatan Nasional (PN) was elected to power.

PN (11)
- PAS (10)
- BERSATU (1)

Name	Portfolio	Party	Constituency	Term start	Term end
Mohd Nassuruddin Daud (Menteri Besar)	Planning; Public Administration; Finance; Economy; Land	PAS	Meranti	15 August 2023	Incumbent
Dr. Mohamed Fadzli Hassan (Deputy Menteri Besar)	Regional Development; Natural Resources; Integrity; Human Development; Law	PAS	Temangan	15 August 2023	Incumbent
Wan Roslan Wan Hamat	Education; Higher Education; Green Technology; Digital and Innovation	PAS	Pengkalan Kubor	15 August 2023	Incumbent
Rohani Ibrahim	Welfare; Women and Family Development	PAS	Tanjong Mas	15 August 2023	Incumbent
Mohd Asri Mat Daud	Islamic Development; Dakwah; Information; Public Relations	PAS	Salor	15 August 2023	Incumbent
Md Anizam Ab Rahman	Investment; Industry; Human Resources; Trade; Entrepreneurship	PAS	Kemahang	15 August 2023	Incumbent
Zamakhshari Mohamad	Youth and Sports; Non-governmental Organisations; Community Unity	PAS	Apam Putra	15 August 2023	Incumbent
Tuan Saripuddin Tuan Ismail	Agriculture and Agro-based Industry; Commodities	PAS	Selising	15 August 2023	Incumbent
Dr. Izani Husin	Public Works; Infrastructure; Water; Rural Development	PAS	Kijang	15 August 2023	Incumbent
Hilmi Abdullah	Local Government; Housing; Health; Environment	PAS	Guchil	15 August 2023	Incumbent
Kamarudin Md Nor	Tourism, Culture, Arts; Heritage	BERSATU	Ayer Lanas	15 August 2023	Incumbent

==== Deputy Members ====
PN (11)
- PAS (8)
- BERSATU (2)

Members since 23 August 2023 have been :

Name	Portfolio	Party	Constituency	Term start	Term end
Wan Rohimi Wan Daud	Regional Development; Natural Resources; Integrity; Human Development; Law	PAS	Melor	23 August 2023	Incumbent
Mohd Nasriff Daud	Investment; Industry; Human Resources; Trade; Entrepreneurship	PAS	Pengkalan Pasir	23 August 2023	Incumbent
Saizol Ismail	Works; Infrastructure; Water; Rural Development	PAS	Salor	23 August 2023	Incumbent
Shaari Mat Hussain	Agriculture; Agrofood Industry; Commodities	BERSATU	Paloh	23 August 2023	Incumbent
Kamaruzaman Mohamad	Education; Higher Education; Green Technology; Digital; Innovation	PAS	Gual Periok	23 August 2023	Incumbent
Nor Asilah Mohamed Zin	Welfare; Family Development; Women	PAS	Limbongan	23 August 2023	Incumbent
Nik Asma' Bahrum Nik Abdullah	Islamic Development; Da'wah; Information; Communication	PAS	Chempaka	23 August 2023	Incumbent
Bahari Mohamad Nor	Youth and Sports; Non-Government Organisation; Community Unity	BERSATU	Gual Ipoh	23 August 2023	Incumbent
Abd Rahman Yunus	Local Government; Housing; Health; Environment	PAS	Pasir Tumboh	23 August 2023	Incumbent
Zameri Mat Nawang	Tourism, Culture, Arts; Heritage	PAS	Jelawat	23 August 2023	Incumbent

=== Ex officio members ===
Position	Office bearer
State Secretary	Tengku Mohamed Faziharudean Tengku Feissal
State Legal Adviser	Zawawi Ghazali
State Financial Officer	Rosnazli Amin

== Legislature ==
Composition of the Kelantan State Legislative Assembly after the 2023 Kelantan state election. Perikatan Nasional (PN) holds 42 seats. Barisan Nasional (BN) holds 2 seats. Pakatan Harapan (PH) holds 1 seat.

The Kelantan State Legislative Assembly is the legislative branch of the Kelantan state government. The unicameral legislature consists of 45 seats that represent the 45 state constituencies within Kelantan, with each constituency being represented by an elected State Assemblyman. The Legislative Assembly convenes at 9th Floor, Mabna MBI Block 8 Building in Kota Bharu.

The legislature has a maximum mandate of five years by law and follows a multi-party system; the ruling party (or coalition) is elected through a first-past-the-post system. The Sultan may dissolve the legislature at any time and usually does so upon the advice of the Menteri Besar.

A Speaker is elected by the Legislative Assembly to preside over the proceedings and debates of the legislature. The Speaker may or may not be an elected State Assemblyman; in the case of the latter, the elected Speaker shall become a member of the Legislative Assembly additional to the elected State Assemblymen already in the legislature.

== Kelantan State Government Secretariat ==
- Internal Audit Division
- Integrity and Governance Division
- Law Division
- Coordination and Special Programme Division
- Disaster Management Division
- Enforcement Division
- SUKMA Secretariat (Temporary)

=== Development Cluster ===
- Local Government Division
- Housing Division
- Investment Division
- Tourism Division
- Infrastructure Corridor and Geospatial Information System
- State Economic Planning Unit

=== Management Cluster ===
- Human Resources Management Division
- Government Meeting Council Division
- Management Service Division
- Information Technology Management Division
- Corporate Management Division

== Departments, statutory bodies and subsidiaries ==
=== Departments ===
- Kelantan State Treasury Office
- Kelantan State Mufti Department
- Kelantan Syariah Judiciary Department
- Office of the Sultan of Kelantan
- Kelantan Syariah Prosecution Department
- Office of Lands and Mines Kelantan
- Kelantan State Public Service Commission
- Kelantan State Islamic Religious Affairs Department
- Kelantan Public Works Department
- Kelantan Irrigation and Drainage Depertment
- Kelantan State Forestry Department
- Kelantan Social Welfare Department
- Kelantan Town and Country Planning Department (PLANMalaysia@Kelantan)
- Department of Veterinary Services of Kelantan
- Kelantan State Agriculture Department
- Kelantan State Development Office
- Kelantan Water Source Department
- Kelantan Government Information Secretariat
- Kelantan Government Women, Family and Health Secretariat

=== Statutory bodies ===
- Kelantan Islamic Religious and Malay Customs Council
- Kelantan Islamic Foundation
- Kelantan State Economic Development Corporation
- Menteri Besar Incorporated, Kelantan
- Kelantan State Museum Corporation
- Kelantan Darul Naim Foundation
- Kelantan State People's Farm Development Corporation
- Bandar Baru Tunjong Corporation
- Kelantan State Agriculture Development Corporation
- Kelantan Public Library Corporation
- Tok Guru Dato Bentara Setia Thought Institute
- Kelantan Stadium Corporation
- Kelantan State Sports Council
- Darul Naim Training Institute

=== Subsidiaries ===
- Kelantan State Economic Development Corporation
  - Kelstone Sdn Bhd (Mining Resource)
  - Kumpulan Pertanian Kelantan Bhd (Agriculture)
  - Damai Sdn Bhd (Agriculture)
  - Kompleks Perkayuan Kelantan Sdn Bhd (Timber)
  - SPP Development Sdn Bhd (Property)
  - Pemodalan Kelantan Berhad (Service, Investment)
    - Ar-Rahn Sdn Bhd (Pawn Loan)
  - Infraquest Sdn. Bhd. (Service)
  - Kel Infra Sdn Bhd (Service, Telecommunications Infrastructure)
  - UB Consult Sdn Bhd (Service, Secretariat)
  - Kelantan ICT Gateway Sdn Bhd (Service, Information, Communications and Technology)
  - Hostcare Sdn Bhd (Service, Medical)
  - Kumpulan Perladangan PKINK Sdn Bhd (Farming, Rubber and Oil Palm)
  - Syarikat Ladang Sungai Terah Sdn Bhd (Farming)
  - Ladang Tapis Sdn Bhd (Farming)
  - Ladang Lumbuk Bongor Sdn Bhd (Farming)
- Menteri Besar Incorporated, Kelantan
  - PMBK Development Sdn Bhd (Property Developer)
  - Kelantan Gold Trade Sdn Bhd (Dinar and Dirham Coins)
  - Kelantan Biotech Corporation Sdn Bhd (Agricultural and Livestock Biotechnology)
  - Bio Tajmeel Cosmeceutical Sdn Bhd (Health and Personal Care Products)
  - PMBK Az-Zahar Sdn Bhd (Mining)
  - Kifaalah Sdn Bhd (Takaful Insurance)
  - Kelantan Utilities Mubaarakan Holdings Sdn Bhd (Utilities and Green Technology)
  - Air Kelantan Sdn Bhd (Water Supply)
  - Daulah Najah Sdn Bhd (Special Purpose Vehicles, economic activities)
  - Kelantan Ventures Sdn Bhd (Special Purpose Vehicles, infrastructure development)
  - Kel-Intaaj Sdn Bhd (HDPE Pipe joint-venture)
  - Pengurusan Sisa Pepejal Mubaarakan Sdn Bhd (Solid Waste Management joint-venture)
  - Akademi Pembangunan Insan Profesional Sdn Bhd (Education and Professional Services joint-venture)

== District and Land Offices ==
- Bachok District
- Gua Musang District
  - Lojing Autonomous Sub-District
- Jeli District
- Kota Bharu District
- Kuala Krai District
- Machang District
- Pasir Mas District
- Pasir Puteh District
- Tanah Merah District
- Tumpat District

== Local governments ==
Most local governments in Kelantan are district councils (Malay: Majlis Daerah), except Kota Bharu Municipal Council. As of today, Kelantan remains one of only two states in Malaysia (other than Perlis) without a formal City Council.

- Bachok District Council (Islamic Tourism City)
- Dabong District Council
- Gua Musang District Council
- Jeli District Council
- Ketereh District Council (Islamic Municipality)
- Kota Bharu Municipal Council (Islamic City)
- Kuala Krai District Council
- Machang District Council
- Pasir Mas District Council
- Pasir Puteh District Council
- Tanah Merah District Council
- Tumpat District Council
