= Kelantan State Executive Council =

- 2023–present
- Date formed: 15 August 2023

People and organisations
- Head of state: Muhammad V
- Head of government: Mohd Nassuruddin Daud (PN–PAS)
- Deputy head of government: Mohamed Fadzli Hassan (PN–PAS)
- Total no. of members: 11
- Member parties: Perikatan Nasional (PN) government: Malaysian Islamic Party (PAS); Malaysian United Indigenous Party (BERSATU)
- Status in legislature: Coalition government 42 / 45
- Opposition parties: Barisan Nasional (BN); United Malays National Organisation (UMNO); Pakatan Harapan (PH); National Trust Party (AMANAH)
- Opposition leader: Mohd Syahbuddin Hashim (BN–UMNO)

History
- Legislature term: 15th Malaysian Parliament

The Kelantan State Executive Council is the executive authority of the Government of Kelantan, Malaysia. The Council comprises the Menteri Besar, appointed by the Sultan on the basis that he is able to command a majority in the Kelantan State Legislative Assembly, a number of members made up of members of the Assembly, the State Secretary, the State Legal Adviser and the State Financial Officer.

This Council is similar in structure and role to the Cabinet of Malaysia, while being smaller in size. As federal and state responsibilities differ, there are a number of portfolios that differ between the federal and state governments.

Members of the Council are selected by the Menteri Besar, appointed by the Sultan. The Council has no ministry, but instead a number of committees; each committee will take care of certain state affairs, activities and departments. Members of the Council are always the chair of a committee.

== Lists of full members ==
=== Mohd Nassuruddin I EXCO (2023–present) ===
==== Members ====
PN (11)
- PAS (10)
- Vacant (1)

Members since 15 August 2023 have been :

Name	Portfolio	Party	Constituency	Term start	Term end
Mohd Nassuruddin Daud (Menteri Besar)	Planning; Public Administration; Finance; Economy; Land	PAS	Meranti	15 August 2023	Incumbent
Dr. Mohamed Fadzli Hassan (Deputy Menteri Besar)	Regional Development; Natural Resources; Integrity; Human Development; Law	PAS	Temangan	15 August 2023	Incumbent
Wan Roslan Wan Hamat	Education; Higher Education; Green Technology; Digital and Innovation	PAS	Pengkalan Kubor	15 August 2023	Incumbent
Rohani Ibrahim	Welfare; Women and Family Development	PAS	Tanjong Mas	15 August 2023	Incumbent
Mohd Asri Mat Daud	Islamic Development; Dakwah; Information; Public Relations	PAS	Salor	15 August 2023	Incumbent
Md Anizam Ab Rahman	Investment; Industry; Human Resources; Trade; Entrepreneurship	PAS	Kemahang	15 August 2023	Incumbent
Zamakhshari Mohamad	Youth and Sports; Non-governmental Organisations; Community Unity; Heritage and Culture (since 11 November 2026)	PAS	Apam Putra	15 August 2023	Incumbent
Tuan Saripuddin Tuan Ismail	Agriculture and Agro-based Industry; Commodities	PAS	Selising	15 August 2023	Incumbent
Dr. Izani Husin	Public Works; Infrastructure; Water; Rural Development	PAS	Kijang	15 August 2023	Incumbent
Hilmi Abdullah	Local Government; Housing; Health; Environment; Tourism and Arts (since 11 November 2026)	PAS	Guchil	15 August 2023	Incumbent
Kamarudin Md Nor	Tourism, Culture, Arts; Heritage	BERSATU	Ayer Lanas	15 August 2023	9 November 2026

==== Deputy Members ====
PN (10)
- PAS (8)
- BERSATU (1)
- Vacant (1)

Members since 23 August 2023 have been :

Name	Portfolio	Party	Constituency	Term start	Term end
Wan Rohimi Wan Daud	Regional Development; Natural Resources; Integrity; Human Development; Law	PAS	Melor	23 August 2023	Incumbent
Mohd Nasriff Daud	Investment; Industry; Human Resources; Trade; Entrepreneurship	PAS	Pengkalan Pasir	23 August 2023	Incumbent
Saizol Ismail	Works; Infrastructure; Water; Rural Development	PAS	Salor	23 August 2023	Incumbent
Shaari Mat Hussain	Agriculture; Agrofood Industry; Commodities	BERSATU	Paloh	23 August 2023	Incumbent
Kamaruzaman Mohamad	Education; Higher Education; Green Technology; Digital; Innovation	PAS	Gual Periok	23 August 2023	Incumbent
Nor Asilah Mohamed Zin	Welfare; Family Development; Women	PAS	Limbongan	23 August 2023	Incumbent
Nik Asma' Bahrum Nik Abdullah	Islamic Development; Da'wah; Information; Communication	PAS	Chempaka	23 August 2023	Incumbent
Bahari Mohamad Nor	Youth and Sports; Non-Government Organisation; Community Unity	BERSATU	Gual Ipoh	23 August 2023	16 November 2026
Abd Rahman Yunus	Local Government; Housing; Health; Environment	PAS	Pasir Tumboh	23 August 2023	Incumbent
Zameri Mat Nawang	Tourism, Culture, Arts; Heritage	PAS	Jelawat	23 August 2023	Incumbent

== Ex officio members ==
Position	Office bearer
State Secretary	Tengku Mohamed Faziharudean Tengku Feissal
State Legal Adviser	Idham Abdul Ghani
State Financial Officer	Rosnazli Amin

== Former membership ==
=== Ahmad Yakob II EXCO (2018–2023) ===
==== Members ====
PN (11)
- PAS (11)

Members from 17 May 2018 to 15 August 2023 were :

Name	Portfolio	Party	Constituency	Term start	Term end
Ahmad Yaakob (Menteri Besar)	Land; Natural Resources; Economic Planning; Finance	PAS	Pasir Pekan	10 May 2018	15 August 2023
Mohd Amar Abdullah (Deputy Menteri Besar)	Public Administration; Regional Development; People's Wellbeing; Integrity	PAS	Panchor	17 May 2018	15 August 2023
Mohamed Fadzli Hassan	Human Development; Education; Higher Education; Information Technology	PAS	Temangan	17 May 2018	15 August 2023
Mohd. Nassuruddin Daud	Islamic Development; Dakwah; Information; Public Relations	PAS	Meranti	17 May 2018	15 August 2023
Hanifa Ahmad	Industry; Trade; Investment; Entrepreneurial Development	PAS	Pengkalan Pasir	17 May 2018	15 August 2023
Md. Anizam Ab. Rahman	People's Unity; Culture and Heritage; Tourism	PAS	Kemahang	17 May 2018	15 August 2023
Mumtaz Md. Nawi MP	Welfare; Women and Family Development	PAS	Demit	17 May 2018	15 August 2023
Tuan Saripuddin Tuan Ismail	Agriculture and Agro-based Industry; Biotechnology; Green Technology; Environment	PAS	Selising	17 May 2018	15 August 2023
Azami Mohd Nor	Public Works; Infrastructure; Utilities	PAS	Kadok	17 May 2018	15 August 2023
Izani Husin	Local Government and Housing; Health	PAS	Kijang	17 May 2018	15 August 2023
Wan Roslan Wan Hamat	Youth and Sports; Non-governmental Organisations	PAS	Pengkalan Kubor	17 May 2018	15 August 2023

==== Deputy Members ====
PN (9)
- PAS (9)

Deputy Members from 17 May 2018 to 15 August 2023 were :

Name	Portfolio	Party		Constituency	Term start	Term end
Mohd Huzaimy Che Husin	Public Administration; Regional Development; People's Wellbeing; Integrity		PAS	Pantai Irama	17 May 2018	15 August 2023
Azhar Salleh	Human Development; Education; Higher Education; Information Technology		PAS	Pulai Chondong	17 May 2018	15 August 2023
Vacant	Islamic Development; Dakwah; Information; Public Relations	N/A	N/A	30 April 2021		15 August 2023
Saiful Adli Abu Bakar	Industry; Trade; Investment; Entrepreneurial Development		PAS	Salor	17 May 2018	15 August 2023
Hassan Mahmood	People's Unity; Culture and Heritage; Tourism		PAS	Tawang	17 May 2018	15 August 2023
Rohani Ibrahim	Welfare; Women and Family Development		PAS	Tanjong Mas	17 May 2018	15 August 2023
Abdul Aziz Abdul Kadir	Agriculture and Agro-based Industry; Biotechnology; Green Technology; Environment		PAS	Jelawat	17 May 2018	15 August 2023
Abdul Rahman Yunus	Public Works; Infrastructure; Utilities		PAS	Pasir Tumboh	17 May 2018	15 August 2023
Hilmi Abdullah	Local Government and Housing; Health		PAS	Guchil	17 May 2018	15 August 2023
Zuraidin Abdullah	Youth and Sports; Non-governmental Organisations		PAS	Chetok	17 May 2018	15 August 2023

=== Ahmad Yakob I EXCO (2013–2018) ===
==== Members ====
PAS (11)

Members from 8 May 2013 to 9 May 2018 :

Name	Portfolio	Party	Constituency	Term start	Term end
Ahmad Yaakob (Menteri Besar)	Public Administration; Economic Planning; Finance	PAS	Pasir Pekan	6 May 2013	9 May 2018
Mohd Amar Abdullah (Deputy Menteri Besar)	Region Development; Land; Investment; Natural Resources	PAS	Panchor	8 May 2013	9 May 2018
Mohamed Fadzli Hassan	Human Development; Education; Higher Education	PAS	Temangan	8 May 2013	9 May 2018
Mohd Nassuruddin Daud	Islamic Development; Dakwah; Information; Public Relations	PAS	Meranti	8 May 2013	9 May 2018
Hanifa Ahmad	Infrastructure; Utilities; Information Technology	PAS	Pengkalan Pasir	8 May 2013	9 May 2018
Md Anizam Ab Rahman	Culture; Tourism; Heritage	PAS	Kemahang	8 May 2013	9 May 2018
Mumtaz Md. Nawi	Family Development; Welfare; People's Wellbeing	PAS	Demit	8 May 2013	9 May 2018
Abdul Fattah Mahmood	Local Government; Housing; Health; Environment	PAS	Bukit Panau	8 May 2013	9 May 2018
Che Abdullah Mat Nawi	Agriculture; Biotechnology; Green Technology	PAS	Wakaf Bharu	8 May 2013	9 May 2018
Anuar Tan Abdullah	Industry; Trade; Community Unity	PAS	Kota Lama	8 May 2013	9 May 2018
Ramli Mamat	Youth Development; Sports; Non-Governmental Organisations (NGOs)	PAS	Bunut Payong	8 May 2013	9 May 2018

=== Nik Abdul Aziz V EXCO (2008–2013) ===
==== Members ====
PAS (11)

Members from 2008 to 2013 :

Name	Portfolio	Party	Constituency	Term start	Term end
Nik Abdul Aziz Nik Mat (Menteri Besar)	Land; Forestry; Natural Resources	PAS	Chempaka	19 March 2008	2013
Ahmad Yakob (Deputy Menteri Besar)	Public Administration; Land and Regional Development	PAS	Pasir Pekan	19 March 2008	2013
Husam Musa	Economic Planning; Finance; Welfare	PAS	Salor	19 March 2008	2013
Anuar Tan Abdullah	Entrepreneur Development; Trade; Community Unity	PAS	Kota Lama	19 March 2008	2013
Takiyuddin Hassan	Local Government; Tourism; Culture	PAS	Bunut Payong	19 March 2008	8 May 2013
Mohd Amar Abdullah	Islamic Development; Education; Dakwah	PAS	Panchor	19 March 2008	2013
Md Anizam Ab Rahman	Housing; Public Works; Utilities; Environment	PAS	Kemahang	19 March 2008	2013
Abdul Fattah Mahmood	Human Development; Youth; Sports; Non-Governmental Organisation (NGOs)	PAS	Bukit Panau	19 March 2008	2013
Che Abdullah Mat Nawi	Agriculture; Rural Industry; Biotechnology	PAS	Wakaf Bharu	19 March 2008	2013
Mohamed Fadzli Hassan	Information; Information Development; Science; Technology	PAS	Temangan	19 March 2008	2013
Wan Ubaidah Omar	Women Development; Family; Health	PAS	Kijang	19 March 2008	2013

==== Deputy Members ====
PAS (13)

Members from 2010 to 2013 :

Name	Portfolio	Party	Constituency	Term start	Term end
Abdul Fatah Harun	Economic Planning; Finance; Welfare	PAS	Bukit Tuku	2010	2013
Azami Md. Nor	Economic Planning; Finance; Welfare	PAS	Kadok	2010	2013
Rohani Ibrahim	Women Development; Family; Health	PAS	Tanjong Mas	2010	2013
Hanifa Ahmad	Public Administration; Land and Regional Development	PAS	Pengkalan Pasir	2010	2013
Muhamad Mustafa	Islamic Development; Education; Dakwah	PAS	Demit	2010	2013
Mohamad Awang	Islamic Development; Education; Dakwah	PAS	Gual Periok	2010	2013
Zulkifli Mamat	Entrepreneur Development; Trade; Community Unity	PAS	Pulai Chondong	2010	2013
Abdullah Ya'kub	Local Government; Tourism; Culture	PAS	Air Lanas	2010	2013
Zainuddin Awang Hamat	Local Government; Tourism; Culture	PAS	Limbongan	2010	2013
Wan Yusoff Wan Mustafa	Housing; Public Works; Utilities; Environment	PAS	Gual Ipoh	2010	2013
Abdul Latif Abdul Rahman	Human Development; Youth; Sports; Non-Governmental Organisations (NGO)	PAS	Mengkebang	2010	2013
Nik Mazian Nik Mohamad	Agriculture; Rural Industry; Biotechnology	PAS	Gaal	2010	2013
Ahmad Baihaki Atiqullah	Information; Information Development; Science; Technology	PAS	Pasir Tumboh	2010	2013

=== Nik Abdul Aziz IIII EXCO (2004–2008) ===
==== Members ====
PAS (11)

Members from 2004 to 2008 :

Name	Portfolio	Party	Constituency	Term start	Term end
Nik Abdul Aziz Nik Mat (Menteri Besar)		PAS	Chempaka	2004	2008
Ahmad Yakob (Deputy Menteri Besar)	Land; Regional Development; Environment	PAS	Pasir Pekan	2004	2008
Husam Musa	Planning; Finance; National Development	PAS	Kijang	2004	2008
Anuar Tan Abdullah	Arts; Tourism; National Unity	PAS	Kota Lama	23 March 2004	18 March 2008
Takiyuddin Hassan	Public Administration; Local Government; Housing	PAS	Bunut Payong	23 March 2004	18 March 2008
Mohd Amar Abdullah	Education; Information	PAS	Panchor	23 March 2004	18 March 2008
Md Anizam Ab Rahman	Public Works; Infrastructure; Health	PAS	Kemahang	2004	2008
Abdul Fattah Mahmood	Women Development; Youth and Sports	PAS	Bukit Panau	2004	2008
Zulkifli Mamat		PAS	Pulai Chondong	2004	2008
Hassan Muhamad		PAS	Temangan	2004	2008
Nik Mazian Nik Mohamad		PAS	Gaal	2004	2008

=== Nik Abdul Aziz III EXCO (1999–2004) ===
==== Members ====
PAS (11)

Members from 1999 to 2004 :

Name	Portfolio	Party	Constituency	Term start	Term end
Nik Abdul Aziz Nik Mat (Menteri Besar)	Land; Forestry; Natural Resources	PAS	Chempaka	1999	2004
Abdul Halim Abdul Rahman (Deputy Menteri Besar)	Trade; Industry; Entrepreneurial Development; Human Resources	PAS	Kijang	1999	2004
Muhammad Daud Iraqi	Community Development; Da'wah; Information; Women's Affairs	PAS	Kenali	1999	2004
Omar Mohamed	Agriculture; Rural Development; Village Industry	PAS	Perupok	1999	2004
Ahmad Yakob	Science and Technology; Housing and Local Government	PAS	Pasir Pekan	1999	2004
Abdullah Ya'kub	Public Works; Public Amenities	PAS	Air Lanas	1999	2004
Hassan Muhamad	Islamic Development; Education; Youth and Sports	PAS	Kemuning	1999	2004
Anuar Tan Abdullah	Race Relations; Tourism; Environment; Health	PAS	Kota Lama	3 December 1999	22 March 2004
Takiyuddin Hassan	Planning; Finance; Public Administration	PAS	Bunut Payong	3 December 1999	22 March 2004

=== Nik Abdul Aziz II EXCO (1995–1999) ===
==== Members ====
PAS (11)

Members from 1995 to 1999 :

Name	Portfolio	Party	Constituency	Term start	Term end
Nik Abdul Aziz Nik Mat (Menteri Besar)		PAS	Chempaka	1995	1999
Abdul Halim Abdul Rahman (Deputy Menteri Besar I)		PAS		1995	1999
Mohd Rozali Isohak (Deputy Menteri Besar II)		S46		1995	1996
Omar Muhammad		PAS		1995	1999
Muhammad Daud Iraqi		PAS		1995	1999
Abdul Halim Mohamed		PAS		1995	1999
Mohd Daud Jaafar		S46		1995	1996
Mohd Noor Ahmad		S46		1995	1996
Nik Mustafa Nik Loding		S46		1995	1996

== See also ==
- Sultan of Kelantan
- Menteri Besar of Kelantan
- Kelantan State Legislative Assembly
