= Mohamad Awang =

Malaysian politician

Yang Berbahagia Dato' Haji Mohamad Awang DJMK
- محمد اوڠ

Exco roles (Kelantan)
- 2010–2013: Deputy Chairman of the Islamic Development, Education and Da'wah

Faction represented in Kelantan State Legislative Assembly
- 2008–2020: Malaysian Islamic Party
- 2020–2023: Perikatan Nasional

Personal details
- Born: Kelantan, Malaysia
- Citizenship: Malaysian
- Party: Malaysian Islamic Party (PAS)
- Other political affiliations: Perikatan Nasional (PN); Muafakat Nasional (MN); Gagasan Sejahtera (GS); Pakatan Rakyat (PR)
- Occupation: Politician

Mohamad bin Awang is a Malaysian politician and served as Deputy of Kelantan State Executive Councillor.

== Election results ==
Kelantan State Legislative Assembly
Year	Constituency	Candidate	Votes	Pct	Opponent(s)	Votes	Pct	Ballots cast	Majority	Turnout
2008	N15 Gual Periok	Mohamad Awang (PAS)	6,915	52.21%	Shaari Mat Hussain (UMNO)	6,182	46.68%	13,514	733	74.41%
2008	N15 Gual Periok	Mohamad Awang (PAS)	6,915	52.21%	Mohammad Zulkifle Abd. Rashid (IND)	147	1.11%	13,514	733	74.41%
2013	N15 Gual Periok	Mohamad Awang (PAS)	8,224	51.94%	Shaari Mat Hussin (UMNO)	7,609	48.06%	16,114	615	75.30%
2018	N15 Gual Periok	Mohamad Awang (PAS)	8,632	51.65%	Ghazali Ismail (UMNO)	6,508	38.95%	17,155	2,123	71.34%
2018	N15 Gual Periok	Mohamad Awang (PAS)	8,632	51.65%	Mohd Ridzuan Muhamad (AMANAH)	1,570	9.40%	17,155	2,123	71.34%

== Honour ==
- Kelantan
  - Knight Commander of the Order of the Life of the Crown of Kelantan (DJMK) – Dato' (2017)
