= Shaari Mat Hussain =

Malaysian politician

Yang Berhormat Dato' Shaari Mat Hussain DPTJ JP MLA

Deputy Member of the Kelantan State Executive Council
- Incumbent
- Assumed office 23 August 2023
- Monarch: Muhammad V
- Menteri Besar: Mohd Nassuruddin Daud
- Member: Tuan Saripuddin Tuan Ismail
- Portfolio: Agriculture, Agrofood Industry and Commodities
- Preceded by: Abdul Aziz Abdul Kadir (Agriculture and Agro-based Industry); Portfolio established (Commodities)
- Constituency: Paloh

Member of the Kelantan State Legislative Assembly for Paloh
- Incumbent
- Assumed office 12 August 2023
- Preceded by: Amran Arifin (BN–UMNO)
- Majority: 2,205 (2023)

Member of the Kelantan State Legislative Assembly for Gual Periok
- In office 21 March 2004 – 8 March 2008
- Preceded by: Abdullah Ab Razak (PAS)
- Succeeded by: Mohamad Awang (PAS)
- Majority: 1,192 (2004)

Personal details
- Born: Shaari bin Mat Hussain; 18 June 1962 (age 64) Rantau Panjang, Pasir Mas, Kelantan, Malaysia
- Party: United Malays National Organisation (UMNO) (2000–2020); Malaysian United Indigenous Party (BERSATU) (2021–present)
- Other political affiliations: Barisan Nasional (BN) (2000–2020); Perikatan Nasional (PN) (2021–present)
- Occupation: Politician

Shaari bin Mat Hussain (born 18 June 1962) is a Malaysian politician who served as Deputy Member of the Kelantan State Executive Council (EXCO) in the Perikatan Nasional (PN) state administration under Menteri Besar Mohd Nassuruddin Daud and Member Tuan Saripuddin Tuan Ismail since August 2023. He served as Member of the Kelantan State Legislative Assembly (MLA) for Paloh since August 2023 and Gual Periok from March 2004 to March 2008. He is a member of Malaysian United Indigenous Party (BERSATU), a component party of Perikatan Nasional (PN) and was a member of United Malays National Organisation (UMNO), a component party of Barisan Nasional (BN).

== Political career ==
In the 2023 state election, Shaari Mat Hussain made his electoral debut after being nominated by PN contested on Paloh. He was elected as Paloh assemblyman with the majority of 2,205 votes.

On 23 August 2023, he was appointed as Deputy Kelantan EXCO Member by Menteri Besar Mohd Nassuruddin Daud. He assumed the portfolios of Agriculture, Agrofood Industry and Commodities and deputising for Tuan Saripuddin Tuan Ismail.

== Election results ==
Kelantan State Legislative Assembly
Year	Constituency	Candidate	Votes	Pct	Opponent(s)	Votes	Pct	Ballots cast	Majority	Turnout
2004	N15 Gual Periok	Shaari Mat Hussain (UMNO)	6,275	55.25%	Abdullah Ab Razak (PAS)	5,083	44.75%	11,547	1,192	69.66%
2008	N15 Gual Periok	Shaari Mat Hussain (UMNO)	6,915	52.21%	Mohamad Awang (PAS)	6,915	52.21%	13,514	733	74.41%
2008	N15 Gual Periok	Shaari Mat Hussain (UMNO)	6,915	52.21%	Mohammad Zulkifle Abd Rashid (IND)	147	1.11%	13,514	733	74.41%
2013	N15 Gual Periok	Shaari Mat Hussain (UMNO)	7,609	48.06%	Mohamad Awang (PAS)	8,224	51.94%	16,114	615	75.30%
2023	N44 Paloh	Shaari Mat Hussain (BERSATU)	7,407	58.74%	Amran Arifin (UMNO)	5,202	41.26%	12,714	2,205	60.08%

== Honours ==
- Kelantan
  - Justice of the Peace (JP) (2025)
- Negeri Sembilan
  - Knight Commander of the Grand Order of Tuanku Jaafar (DPTJ) – Dato' (2003)
