= Hilmi Abdullah =

Malaysian politician

Yang Berhormat Tuan Hilmi Abdullah JMK MLA
- حيلمي عبدالله

Member of the Kelantan State Executive Council
- Incumbent
- Assumed office 15 August 2023
- Monarch: Muhammad V
- Menteri Besar: Mohd Nassuruddin Daud
- Portfolio: Local Government, Housing, Health and Environment
- Preceded by: Izani Husin (Local Government and Housing, Health); Tuan Saripuddin Tuan Ismail (Environment)
- Constituency: Guchil

Deputy Member of the Kelantan State Executive Council
- In office 17 May 2018 – 15 August 2023
- Monarch: Muhammad V
- Menteri Besar: Ahmad Yakob
- Member: Izani Husin
- Portfolio: Local Government and Housing, Health
- Succeeded by: Abd Rahman Yunus
- Constituency: Guchil

Member of the Kelantan State Legislative Assembly for Guchil
- Incumbent
- Assumed office 9 May 2018
- Preceded by: Mohd Roslan Puteh (PH–PKR)
- Majority: 2,279 (2018); 6,294 (2023)

Personal details
- Born: Hilmi bin Abdullah; 5 April 1977 (age 49) Kelantan, Malaysia
- Party: Malaysian Islamic Party (PAS)
- Other political affiliations: Gagasan Sejahtera (GS) (–2020); Perikatan Nasional (PN) (2020–present)
- Occupation: Politician
- Profession: Lawyer

Hilmi bin Abdullah (born 5 April 1977) is a Malaysian politician who serve as Member of the Kelantan State Executive Council (EXCO) in the Perikatan Nasional (PN) administration under Menteri Besar Mohd Nassuruddin Daud since August 2023, Deputy Member of the Kelantan State Executive Council in the Gagasan Sejahtera (GS) administration under Menteri Besar Ahmad Yaakob from May 2018 to August 2023 as well as Member of the Kelantan State Legislative Assembly (MLA) for Guchil since May 2018. He is a member of Malaysian Islamic Party (PAS), a component party of Perikatan Nasional (PN) coalitions, formerly Gagasan Sejahtera (GS) coalitions.

== Political career ==
In the 2018 state election, Hilmi Abdullah made his electoral debut after being nominated by GS contested on Guchil. He was elected as Guchil assemblyman with the majority of 2,279 votes. In the 2023 state election, he was reelected as Guchil assemblyman with the majority of 6,294.

On 17 May 2018, he was appointed as Deputy Kelantan EXCO Member by Menteri Besar Ahmad Yaakob. He assumed the portfolios of Local Government and Housing, Health and deputising for Izani Husin. On 15 August 2023, he was appointed as Kelantan EXCO Member by Menteri Besar Mohd Nassuruddin Daud. He assumed the portfolios of Local Government, Housing, Health and Environment, taking over the former three portfolios from former Kijang MLA Izani Husin and the latter one portfolio from former Selising MLA Tuan Saripuddin Tuan Ismail.

== Election results ==
Kelantan State Legislative Assembly
Year	Constituency	Candidate	Votes	Pct	Opponent(s)	Votes	Pct	Ballots cast	Majority	Turnout
2018	N40 Guchil	Hilmi Abdullah (PAS)	7,564	49.33%	Zuber Hassan (UMNO)	5,285	34.47%	15,524	2,279	75.51%
2018	N40 Guchil	Hilmi Abdullah (PAS)	7,564	49.33%	Mohd Roslan Puteh (PKR)	2,362	15.40%	15,524	2,279	75.51%
2018	N40 Guchil	Hilmi Abdullah (PAS)	7,564	49.33%	Abd Aziz Ahmad (IND)	123	0.80%	15,524	2,279	75.51%
2023	N40 Guchil	Hilmi Abdullah (PAS)	10,826	70.49%	Zuber Hassan (UMNO)	4,532	29.51%	15,480	6,294	55.71%

== Honours ==
- Kelantan
  - Companion of the Order of the Life of the Crown of Kelantan (JMK) (2026)
