= Muhammad Faisal Abdul Rahman =

Malaysian politician

Yang Berhormat Tuan Muhammad Faisal Abdul Rahman MLA
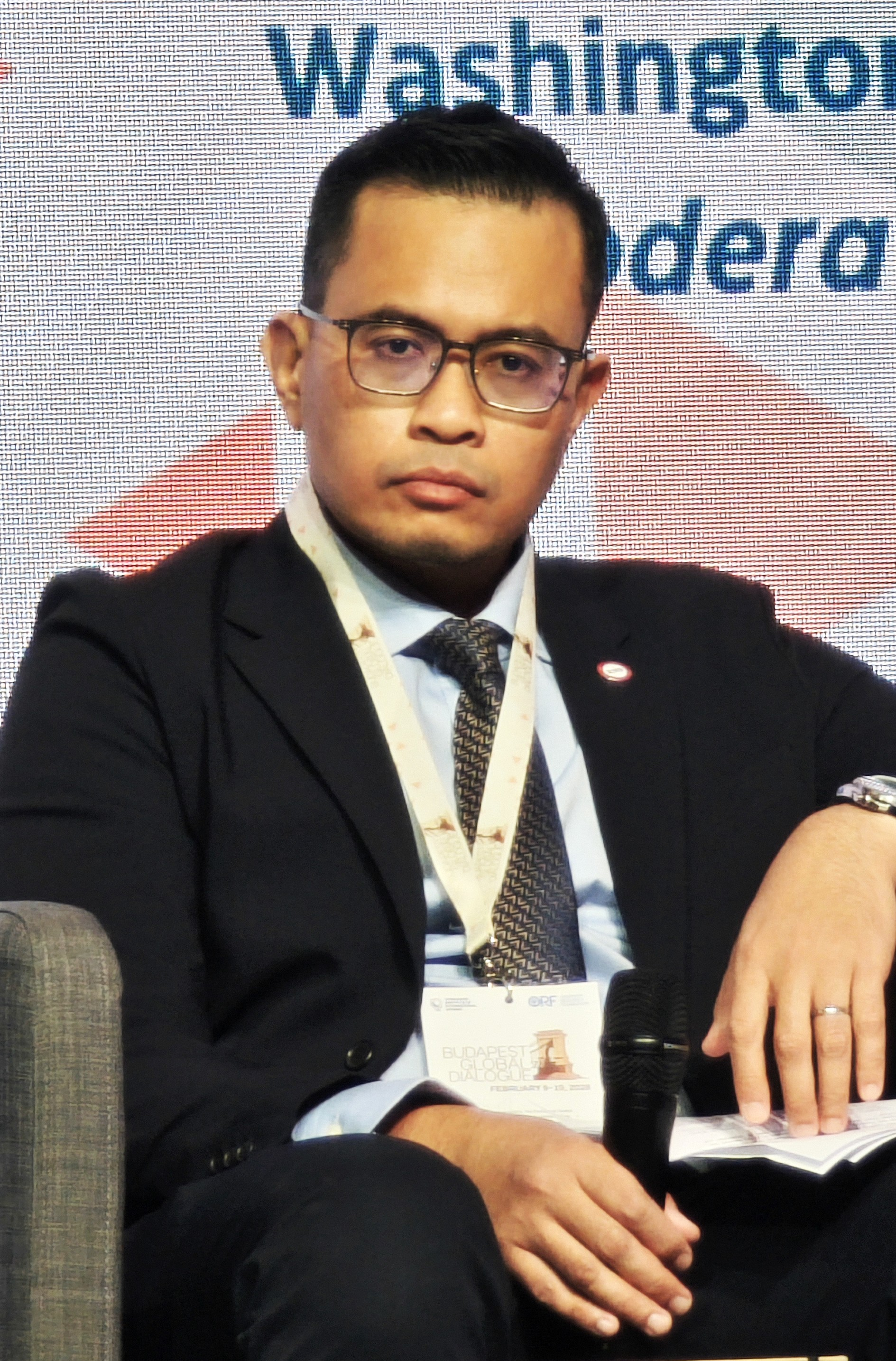

Member of the Perak State Legislative Assembly for Trong
- Incumbent
- Assumed office 19 November 2022
- Preceded by: Jamilah Zakaria (BN–UMNO)
- Majority: 616 (2022)

Personal details
- Born: 3 August 1979 (age 46)
- Party: Malaysian Islamic Party (PAS)
- Other political affiliations: Perikatan Nasional (PN)

Muhammad Faisal bin Abdul Rahman is a Malaysian politician who served as Member of the Perak State Legislative Assembly (MLA) for Trong since November 2022. He is a member of Malaysian Islamic Party (PAS), a component party of Perikatan Nasional (PN) coalitions.

== Election results ==
Perak State Legislative Assembly
Year	Constituency	Candidate	Votes	Pct	Opponent(s)	Votes	Pct	Ballots cast	Majority	Turnout
2018	N15 Trong	Muhammad Faisal Abdul Rahman (PAS)	3,241	29.66%	Jamilah Zakaria (UMNO)	5,139	47.03%	11,173	1,898	81.37%
2018	N15 Trong	Muhammad Faisal Abdul Rahman (PAS)	3,241	29.66%	Shaharuddin Abdul Rashid (BERSATU)	2,546	23.30%	11,173	1,898	81.37%
2022	N15 Trong	Muhammad Faisal Abdul Rahman (PAS)	5,671	43.77%	Jamilah Zakaria (UMNO)	5,055	39.01%	13,365	616	77.29%
2022	N15 Trong	Muhammad Faisal Abdul Rahman (PAS)	5,671	43.77%	Junaida Jamaluddin (PKR)	2,119	16.35%	13,365	616	77.29%
2022	N15 Trong	Muhammad Faisal Abdul Rahman (PAS)	5,671	43.77%	Mustaffa Kamal (PEJUANG)	112	0.86%	13,365	616	77.29%
