= Tuan Saripuddin Tuan Ismail =

Malaysian politician

Yang Berhormat Dato' Tuan Saripuddin Tuan Ismail DJMK JMK MLA
- توان شريڤ الدين توان إسماعيل
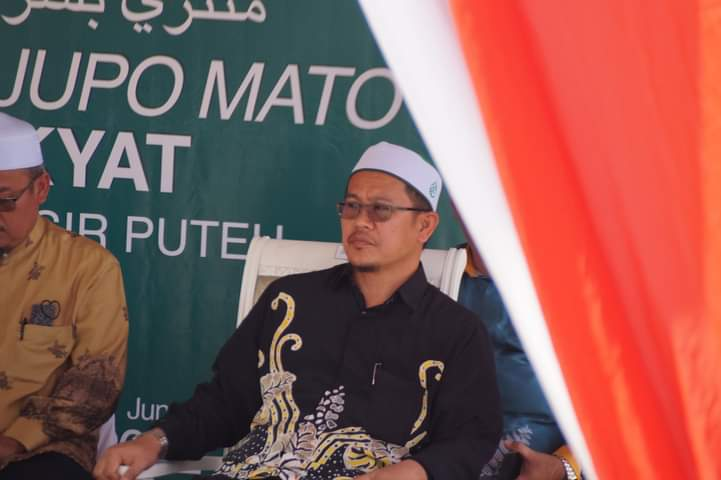

Member of the Kelantan State Executive Council
- Incumbent
- Assumed office 15 August 2023
- Monarch: Muhammad V
- Deputy: Shaari Mat Hussain
- Menteri Besar: Mohd Nassuruddin Daud
- Portfolio: Agriculture, Agrofood Industry and Commodities
- Preceded by: Himself (Agriculture and Agro-based Industry); Portfolio established (Commodities)
- Constituency: Selising
- In office 17 May 2018 – 15 August 2023
- Monarch: Muhammad V
- Deputy: Abdul Aziz Abdul Kadir
- Menteri Besar: Ahmad Yaakob
- Portfolio: Agriculture, Agro-Based Industry, Biotechnology, Green Technology and Environment
- Preceded by: Che Abdullah Mat Nawi (Agriculture, Biotechnology & Green Technology); Portfolio established (Agro-Based Industry); Abdul Fattah Mahmood (Environment)
- Succeeded by: Himself (Agriculture, Agrofood Industry); Portfolio abolished (Biotechnology); Wan Roslan Wan Hamat (Green Technology); Hilmi Abdullah (Environment)
- Constituency: Selising

Faction represented in Kelantan State Legislative Assembly
- 2018–2020: Malaysian Islamic Party
- 2020–: Perikatan Nasional

Personal details
- Born: Tuan Saripuddin bin Tuan Ismail; 27 June 1972 (age 53) Tasek Pauh, Selising, Kelantan, Malaysia
- Citizenship: Malaysian
- Party: Malaysian Islamic Party (PAS)
- Other political affiliations: Perikatan Nasional (PN); Muafakat Nasional (MN); Gagasan Sejahtera (GS)
- Occupation: Politician

Tuan Saripuddin bin Tuan Ismail (born 27 June 1972) is a Malaysian politician who has served as Member of the Kelantan State Legislative Assembly (MLA) for Selising since May 2018 and currently serves as Kelantan State Executive Councillor.

== Election results ==
Kelantan State Legislative Assembly
Year	Constituency	Candidate	Votes	Pct	Opponent(s)	Votes	Pct	Ballots cast	Majority	Turnout
2018	N29 Selising	Tuan Saripuddin Tuan Ismail (PAS)	9,640	56.81%	Zulkifle Ali (UMNO)	6,520	38.43%	17,408	3,120	81.54%
2018	N29 Selising	Tuan Saripuddin Tuan Ismail (PAS)	9,640	56.81%	Ismail Mohamad (PKR)	808	4.76%	17,408	3,120	81.54%
2023	N29 Selising	Tuan Saripuddin Tuan Ismail (PAS)	12,481	69.11%	Hashim Ismail (UMNO)	5,578	30.89%	18,194	6,903	63.34%

== Honours ==
- Kelantan
  - Knight Commander of the Order of the Life of the Crown of Kelantan (DJMK) – Dato' (2024)
  - Companion of the Order of the Life of the Crown of Kelantan (JMK) (2022)
