= Paloh (Kelantan state constituency) =

Represented in the Kelantan State Legislative Assembly

Paloh (N44)
Kelantan constituency

State constituency
- Legislature: Kelantan State Legislative Assembly
MLA
Shaari Mat Hussain
PN
- Constituency created: 1984
- First contested: 1986
- Last contested: 2023

Demographics
- Electors (2023): 21,162
- Area (km²): 3,046 km²

Paloh is a state constituency in Kelantan, Malaysia, that has been represented in the Kelantan State Legislative Assembly.

The state constituency was first contested in 1986 and is mandated to return a single Assemblyman to the Kelantan State Legislative Assembly under the first-past-the-post voting system. It is the largest state constituency in Kelantan.

== Demographics ==
Ethnic breakdown of Paloh's electorate as of 2023
1. Malay (97.2%)
2. Other ethnicities (2.67%)
3. Chinese (0.08%)
4. Indian (0.01%)

== History ==
=== Polling districts ===
According to the Gazette issued on 30 March 2018, the Paloh constituency has a total of 11 polling districts.

State Constituency	Polling Districts	Code	Location
Paloh (N44)	FELDA Sungai Chiku 3	032/44/01	SMK Bandar Chiku
Paloh (N44)	Pasir Limggi	032/44/02	SK Pasir Linggi
Paloh (N44)	KESEDAR Paloh	032/44/03	SMK Paloh
Paloh (N44)	KESEDAR Sungai Chalil	032/44/04	SK Chalil
Paloh (N44)	Lebir	032/44/05	SK Lebir
Paloh (N44)	KESEDAR Paloh 3	032/44/06	SK Paloh 3
Paloh (N44)	Aring	032/44/07	SK Aring
Paloh (N44)	FELDA Sungai Chiku 1	032/44/08	SMK Chiku 2
Paloh (N44)	FELDA Sungai Chiku 7	032/44/09	SK Chiku 7
Paloh (N44)	FELDA Sungai Chiku 2	032/44/10	SK Sri Chiku 2
Paloh (N44)	KESEDAR Paloh 2	032/44/11	SK Paloh 1; SK Paloh 2

=== Representation history ===
Members of the Legislative Assembly for Paloh
Assembly	No	Years	Member	Party
Constituency created from Gua Musang
7th	N38	1986–1990	Ariffin Said	BN (UMNO)
8th	N38	1990–1995	Nozula Mat Diah	S46
9th	N42	1995–1999	Nozula Mat Diah	S46
10th	N42	1999–2004	Nozula Mat Diah	BN (UMNO)
11th	N44	2004–2008	Nozula Mat Diah	BN (UMNO)
12th	N44	2008–2013	Nozula Mat Diah	BN (UMNO)
13th	N44	2013–2018	Nozula Mat Diah	BN (UMNO)
14th	N44	2018–2023	Amran Arifin	BN (UMNO)
15th	N44	2023–present	Shaari Mat Hussain	PN (BERSATU)

== Election results ==
Kelantan state election, 2023
Party	Candidate	Votes	%	∆%
PAS	Shaari Mat Hussain	7,407	58.74	▲15.92
BN	Amran Arifin	5,202	41.26	▼12.69
Total valid votes		12,609	100.00	
Total rejected ballots		92		
Unreturned ballots		13		
Turnout		12,714	60.08	▼17.41
Registered electors		21,162		
Majority		2,205	17.48	▲6.35
PAS gain from BN		Swing		?

Kelantan state election, 2018
Party	Candidate	Votes	%	∆%
BN	Amran Arifin	6,974	53.95	▼12.79
PAS	Azman Ahmad	5,535	42.82	▲42.82
PKR	Noraini Husain	417	3.23	▼30.03
Total valid votes		12,926	100.00	
Total rejected ballots		218		
Unreturned ballots		118		
Turnout		13,262	77.49	▼10.71
Registered electors		17,115		
Majority		1,439	11.13	▼22.35
BN hold		Swing		

Kelantan state election, 2013
Party	Candidate	Votes	%	∆%
BN	Nozula Mat Diah	7,847	66.74	▲0.19
PKR	Amran Ab Ghani	3,910	33.26	▼0.19
Total valid votes		11,757	100.00	
Total rejected ballots		260		
Unreturned ballots		19		
Turnout		12,032	88.20	▲1.46
Registered electors		13,642		
Majority		3,937	33.48	▲0.38
BN hold		Swing		

Kelantan state election, 2008
Party	Candidate	Votes	%	∆%
BN	Nozula Mat Diah	5,697	66.55	▼2.38
PKR	Reizal Abdul Rahim	2,864	33.45	▲2.38
Total valid votes		8,561	100.00	
Total rejected ballots		135		
Unreturned ballots		19		
Turnout		8,713	86.74	▲1.48
Registered electors		10,045		
Majority		2,833	33.10	▼4.76
BN hold		Swing		

Kelantan state election, 2004
Party	Candidate	Votes	%	∆%
BN	Nozula Mat Diah	5,244	68.93	▲9.13
PKR	Norazman Mat Amin	2,364	31.07	▼9.13
Total valid votes		7,608	100.00	
Total rejected ballots		0		
Unreturned ballots		144		
Turnout		7,752	85.26	▲1.12
Registered electors		9,092		
Majority		2,880	37.86	▲18.26
BN hold		Swing		

Kelantan state election, 1999
Party	Candidate	Votes	%	∆%
BN	Nozula Mat Diah	4,984	59.80	▲31.50
PKR	Nik Abdul Aziz Nik Hassan	3,350	40.20	▲40.20
Total valid votes		8,334	100.00	
Total rejected ballots		180		
Unreturned ballots		0		
Turnout		8,514	84.14	▲0.37
Registered electors		10,119		
Majority		1,634	19.60	▼22.77
BN gain from S46		Swing		?

Kelantan state election, 1995
Party	Candidate	Votes	%	∆%
S46	Nozula Mat Diah	5,422	70.67	▼4.77
BN	Mohd. Akram Khan Awang Shaikh	2,171	28.30	▲3.74
KITA	Mohamad Yusof	79	1.03	▲1.03
Total valid votes		7,672	100.00	
Total rejected ballots		355		
Unreturned ballots		7		
Turnout		8,034	83.77	▼0.84
Registered electors		9,591		
Majority		3,251	42.37	▼8.51
S46 hold		Swing		

Kelantan state election, 1990
Party	Candidate	Votes	%	∆%
S46	Nozula Mat Diah	8,408	75.44	▲75.44
BN	Ariffin Said	2,737	24.56	▼51.59
Total valid votes		11,145	100.00	
Total rejected ballots		210		
Unreturned ballots		0		
Turnout		11,355	84.61	▲7.74
Registered electors		13,420		
Majority		5,671	50.88	▼1.42
S46 gain from BN		Swing		?

Kelantan state election, 1986
Party	Candidate	Votes	%
BN	Ariffin Said	5,329	76.15
PAS	Mokhtar Salleh	1,669	23.85
Total valid votes		6,998	100.00
Total rejected ballots		232	
Unreturned ballots		0	
Turnout		7,230	76.87
Registered electors		9,406	
Majority		3,660	52.30
This was a new constituency created.
