= Selising =

State constituency in Kelantan, Malaysia

Selising (N29)
Kelantan constituency

State constituency
- Legislature: Kelantan State Legislative Assembly
MLA
Tuan Saripuddin Tuan Ismail
PN
- Constituency created: 1974
- First contested: 1974
- Last contested: 2023

Demographics
- Electors (2023): 28,725

Selising is a state constituency in Kelantan, Malaysia, that has been represented in the Kelantan State Legislative Assembly.

The state constituency was first contested in 1974 and is mandated to return a single Assemblyman to the Kelantan State Legislative Assembly under the first-past-the-post voting system.

== Demographics ==
As of 2020, Selising has a population of 35,575 people.

Ethnic breakdown of Selising's electorate as of 2023
1. Malay (99.1%)
2. Other ethnicities (0.48%)
3. Chinese (0.42%)
4. Indian (0.02%)

== History ==
=== Polling districts ===
According to the Gazette issued on 30 March 2018, the Selising constituency has a total of 13 polling districts.

State Constituency	Polling Districts	Code	Location
Selising (N29)	Kedai Menanti	028/29/01	SK Tualang Tinggi
Selising (N29)	Danan	028/29/02	SK Danan
Selising (N29)	Bukit Merbau	028/29/03	SK Bukit Merbau
Selising (N29)	Tualang	028/29/04	SK Tasek Pauh
Selising (N29)	Tasik Pauh	028/29/05	SK Tasek Pauh
Selising (N29)	Selising	028/29/06	SK Bukit Jawa
Selising (N29)	Padang Pak Omar	028/29/07	SMK Bukit Jawa
Selising (N29)	Banir Belikong	028/29/08	SK Bukit Abal
Selising (N29)	Bukit Abal	028/29/09	SMK Sri Maharaja
Selising (N29)	Berangan	028/29/10	SK Kampong Berangan
Selising (N29)	Alor Geliong	028/29/11	SK Banggol Pa' Esah
Selising (N29)	Bukit Bidang	028/29/12	SK Bukit Jawa (2)
Selising (N29)	Kampung Seligi	028/29/13	SK Seligi

=== Representation history ===
Members of the Legislative Assembly for Selising
Assembly	No	Years	Member	Party
Constituency created from Pasir Puteh Utara
4th	N28	1974–1978	Abdul Kadir Mat Sa'ad	BN (PAS)
5th	N28	1978–1982	Wan Mohamed Wan Abu Bakar	BN (UMNO)
6th	N28	1982–1983	Abdul Rahman Ahmad	PAS
6th	N28	1983–1986	Wan Mohamed Wan Abu Bakar	BN (UMNO)
7th	N25	1986–1990	Wan Mohamed Wan Abu Bakar	BN (UMNO)
8th	N25	1990–1995	Che Bisi Hassan	PAS
9th	N28	1995–1999	Che Bisi Hassan	PAS
10th	N28	1999–2004	Saipul Bahrin Mohamad	PAS
11th	N29	2004–2008	Amran Mat Nor	BN (UMNO)
12th	N29	2008–2013	Saipul Bahrin Mohamad	PAS
13th	N29	2013–2018	Zulkifle Ali	BN (UMNO)
14th	N29	2018–2020	Tuan Saripuddin Tuan Ismail	PAS
14th	N29	2020–2023	Tuan Saripuddin Tuan Ismail	PN (PAS)
15th	N29	2023–present	Tuan Saripuddin Tuan Ismail	PN (PAS)

== Election results ==
Kelantan state election, 2023: Selising
Party	Candidate	Votes	%	∆%
PAS	Tuan Saripudin Tuan Ismail	12,481	69.11	▲12.30
BN	Hashim Ismail	5,578	30.89	▼7.54
Total valid votes		18,059	100.00	
Total rejected ballots		135		
Unreturned ballots		28		
Turnout		18,222	63.44	▼18.10
Registered electors		28,725		
Majority		6,903	38.22	▲19.83
PAS hold		Swing		

Kelantan state election, 2018: Selising
Party	Candidate	Votes	%	∆%
PAS	Tuan Saripudin Tuan Ismail	9,640	56.81	▲7.55
BN	Zulkifle Ali	6,520	38.43	▼11.53
PKR	Ismail Mohamad	808	4.76	▲4.76
Total valid votes		16,968	100.00	
Total rejected ballots		281		
Unreturned ballots		159		
Turnout		17,408	81.54	▼4.96
Registered electors		21,348		
Majority		3,120	18.39	▲17.69
PAS gain from BN		Swing		?

Kelantan state election, 2013: Selising
Party	Candidate	Votes	%	∆%
BN	Zulkifle Ali	7,662	49.96	▲3.04
PAS	Saipul Bahrin Mohamad	7,555	49.26	▼3.82
Independent	Ibrahim Ismail	120	0.78	▲0.78
Total valid votes		15,337	100.00	
Total rejected ballots		236		
Unreturned ballots		53		
Turnout		15,626	86.50	▲3.10
Registered electors		18,058		
Majority		107	0.70	▼5.46
BN gain from PAS		Swing		?

Kelantan state election, 2008: Selising
Party	Candidate	Votes	%	∆%
PAS	Saipul Bahrin Mohamad	6,737	53.08	▲3.92
BN	Hashim Ismail	5,954	46.92	▼3.92
Total valid votes		12,691	100.00	
Total rejected ballots		172		
Unreturned ballots		29		
Turnout		12,892	83.40	▲2.30
Registered electors		15,458		
Majority		783	6.16	▲4.48
PAS gain from BN		Swing		?

Kelantan state election, 2004: Selising
Party	Candidate	Votes	%	∆%
BN	Amran Mat Nor	5,679	50.84	▲11.88
PAS	Saipul Bahrin Mohamad	5,492	49.16	▼11.88
Total valid votes		11,171	100.00	
Total rejected ballots		177		
Unreturned ballots		0		
Turnout		11,348	81.10	▲3.65
Registered electors		13,993		
Majority		187	1.68	▼20.40
BN gain from PAS		Swing		?

Kelantan state election, 1999: Selising
Party	Candidate	Votes	%	∆%
PAS	Saipul Bahrin Mohamad	6,816	61.04	▲4.79
BN	Abdul Rahman Yasin	4,350	38.96	▼4.15
Total valid votes		11,166	100.00	
Total rejected ballots		217		
Unreturned ballots		2		
Turnout		11,385	77.45	▲2.84
Registered electors		14,700		
Majority		2,466	22.08	▲8.94
PAS hold		Swing		

Kelantan state election, 1995: Selising
Party	Candidate	Votes	%	∆%
PAS	Che Bisi Hassan	5,767	56.25	▼13.02
BN	Che Age Awang	4,420	43.11	▲13.31
KITA	Nik Hassan Nik Ya	66	0.64	▲0.64
Total valid votes		10,253	100.00	
Total rejected ballots		281		
Unreturned ballots		13		
Turnout		10,547	74.61	▼4.32
Registered electors		14,136		
Majority		1,347	13.14	▼26.33
PAS hold		Swing		

Kelantan state election, 1990: Selising
Party	Candidate	Votes	%	∆%
PAS	Che Bisi Hassan	6,855	69.27	▲20.61
BN	Wan Esah Wan Adam	2,950	29.80	▼21.54
Independent	Nik Hassan Nik Ya	93	0.93	▲0.93
Total valid votes		9,898	100.00	
Total rejected ballots		335		
Unreturned ballots		0		
Turnout		10,233	78.93	▲2.53
Registered electors		12,964		
Majority		3,905	39.47	▲36.79
PAS gain from BN		Swing		?

Kelantan state election, 1986: Selising
Party	Candidate	Votes	%	∆%
BN	Wan Mohamed Wan Abu Bakar	4,609	51.34	▼11.56
PAS	Che Bisi Hassan	4,368	48.66	▲13.33
Total valid votes		8,977	100.00	
Total rejected ballots		257		
Unreturned ballots		0		
Turnout		9,234	76.40	▲2.38
Registered electors		12,086		
Majority		241	2.68	▼24.90
BN hold		Swing		

Kelantan state by-election, 1983: Selising Upon the nullification of the incumbent, Ab. Rahman bin Ahmad
Party	Candidate	Votes	%	
BN	Wan Muhammad Wan Abu Bakar	5,734	62.91	
PAS	Ab. Rahman Ahmad	3,220	35.33	
HAMIM	Mohamed Nawi Awang	161	1.77	
Total valid votes		9,115	100.00	
Total rejected ballots		48		
Unreturned ballots		0		
Turnout		9,163	74.03	
Registered electors		12,378		
Majority		2,514	27.58	
BN gain from PAS		Swing		-

Kelantan state election, 1982: Selising
Party	Candidate	Votes	%	∆%
On the nomination day, Ab. Rahman Ahmad won uncontested.
PAS	Ab. Rahman Ahmad			
Total valid votes				
Total rejected ballots				
Unreturned ballots				
Turnout				
Registered electors		12,320		
Majority				
PAS gain from BN		Swing		-

Kelantan state election, 1978: Selising
Party	Candidate	Votes	%	∆%
BN	Wan Muhammad Wan Abu Bakar	4,929	60.86	▲60.86
PAS	Mohamad Nor Ab. Majid	2,343	28.93	▼22.44
Pan-Malaysian Islamic Front	Setapa Abd. Rahman	474	5.85	▲5.85
Independent	Mahmud Hussin	353	4.36	▼44.28
Total valid votes		8,099	100.00	
Total rejected ballots		108		
Unreturned ballots		0		
Turnout		8,207	78.02	▲1.62
Registered electors		10,519		
Majority		2,586	31.93	▲29.20
BN hold		Swing		

Kelantan state election, 1974: Selising
Party	Candidate	Votes	%
BN	Abdul Kadir Mat Saad	3,893	51.37
Independent	Abdul Rahman Ahmad	3,686	48.63
Total valid votes		7,579	100.00
Total rejected ballots		548	
Unreturned ballots		0	
Turnout		8,127	76.40
Registered electors		10,638	
Majority		207	2.73
This was a new constituency created.
