= Gual Periok =

Gual Periok (N15)
Kelantan constituency

State constituency
- Legislature: Kelantan State Legislative Assembly
MLA
Kamaruzaman Mohamad
PN
- Constituency created: 1974
- First contested: 1974
- Last contested: 2023

Demographics
- Electors (2023): 36,081

Gual Periok is a state constituency in Kelantan, Malaysia, that has been represented in the Kelantan State Legislative Assembly.

The state constituency was first contested in 1974 and is mandated to return a single Assemblyman to the Kelantan State Legislative Assembly under the first-past-the-post voting system.

== Demographics ==
As of 2020, Gual Periok has a population of 41,770 people.

Ethnic breakdown of Gual Periok's electorate as of 2023
1. Malay (97.0%)
2. Other ethnicities (1.76%)
3. Chinese (1.17%)
4. Indian (0.09%)

== History ==
=== Polling districts ===
According to the Gazette issued on 30 March 2018, the Gual Periok constituency has a total of 12 polling districts.

State Constituency	Polling Districts	Code	Location
Gual Periok (N15）	Lubok Gong	023/15/01	SK Gual To' Deh
Gual Periok (N15）	Kedai Gual Periok	023/15/02	SK Gual Periok
Gual Periok (N15）	Gual Sitok	023/15/03	SK Gual Sitok
Gual Periok (N15）	Pekan Rantau Panjang	023/15/04	SK Sri Rantau Panjang (1)
Gual Periok (N15）	Kedai Lama	023/15/05	SK Rantau Panjang
Gual Periok (N15）	Banggol Kulim	023/15/06	Maahad Muhammadi Rantau Panjang
Gual Periok (N15）	Bakat	023/15/07	SMK Gual Periok
Gual Periok (N15）	Kubang Kual	023/15/08	SK Kubang Kuau
Gual Periok (N15）	Bukit Tandak	023/15/09	SMK Baroh Pial
Gual Periok (N15）	Kuala Itek	023/15/10	SK Kok Pauh
Gual Periok (N15）	Lubok Setol	023/15/11	SK Lubok Setol
Gual Periok (N15）	Kampung Rahmat	023/15/12	SK Rahmat

=== Representation history ===
Members of the Legislative Assembly for Gual Periok
Assembly	No	Years	Member	Party
Constituency created from Rantau Panjang
4th	N16	1974–1978	Hussein Ahmad	BN (UMNO)
5th	N16	1978–1982	Hussein Ahmad	BN (UMNO)
6th	N16	1982–1986	Zakaria Botok	BN (UMNO)
7th	N13	1986–1990	Abdul Rahman Awang	BN (UMNO)
8th	N13	1990–1995	Nik Mustapha Nik Loding	S46
9th	N14	1995–1996	Nik Mustapha Nik Loding	S46
9th	N14	1996–1999	Nik Mustapha Nik Loding	BN (UMNO)
10th	N14	1999–2004	Abdullah Ab. Razak	PAS
11th	N15	2004–2008	Shaari Mat Hussain	BN (UMNO)
12th	N15	2008–2013	Mohamad Awang	PR (PAS)
13th	N15	2013–2018	Mohamad Awang	PR (PAS)
14th	N15	2018–2020	Mohamad Awang	PAS
14th	N15	2020–2023	Mohamad Awang	PN (PAS)
15th	N15	2023–present	Kamaruzaman Mohamad	PN (PAS)

== Election results ==
Kelantan state election, 2023: Gual Periok
Party	Candidate	Votes	%	∆%
PAS	Kamaruzaman Mohamad	11,557	64.19	▲12.54
BN	Anuar Mohamad	6,448	35.81	▼3.14
Total valid votes		18,005	100.00	
Total rejected ballots		179		
Unreturned ballots		36		
Turnout		18,220	50.50	▼20.84
Registered electors		36,081		
Majority		5,109	28.38	▲15.68
PAS hold		Swing		

Kelantan state election, 2018: Gual Periok
Party	Candidate	Votes	%	∆%
PAS	Mohamad Awang	8,632	51.65	▼0.29
BN	Ghazali Ismail	6,509	38.95	▼9.11
PKR	Mohd Ridzuan Muhamad	1,570	9.40	▲9.40
Total valid votes		16,711	100.00	
Total rejected ballots		325		
Unreturned ballots		119		
Turnout		17,155	71.34	▼3.96
Registered electors		24,046		
Majority		2,123	12.70	▲8.82
PAS hold		Swing		

Kelantan state election, 2013: Gual Periok
Party	Candidate	Votes	%	∆%
PAS	Mohamad Awang	8,224	51.94	▼0.57
BN	Shaari Mat Hussain	7,609	48.06	▲1.38
Total valid votes		15,833	100.00	
Total rejected ballots		240		
Unreturned ballots		41		
Turnout		16,114	75.30	▲0.89
Registered electors		21,387		
Majority		615	3.88	▼1.65
PAS hold		Swing		

Kelantan state election, 2008: Gual Periok
Party	Candidate	Votes	%	∆%
PAS	Mohamad Awang	6,915	52.21	▲7.46
BN	Shaari Mat Hussain	6,182	46.68	▼8.57
Independent	Mohammad Zulkifle Abd. Rashid	147	1.11	▲1.11
Total valid votes		13,244	100.00	
Total rejected ballots		237		
Unreturned ballots		33		
Turnout		13,514	74.41	▲4.75
Registered electors		18,162		
Majority		733	5.53	▼4.97
PAS gain from BN		Swing		?

Kelantan state election, 2004: Gual Periok
Party	Candidate	Votes	%	∆%
BN	Shaari Mat Hussain	6,275	55.25	▲13.38
PAS	Abdullah Ab. Razak	5,083	44.75	▼13.38
Total valid votes		11,358	100.00	
Total rejected ballots		175		
Unreturned ballots		14		
Turnout		11,547	69.66	▲0.69
Registered electors		16,577		
Majority		1,192	10.50	▼16.80
BN gain from PAS		Swing		?

Kelantan state election, 1999: Gual Periok
Party	Candidate	Votes	%	∆%
PAS	Abdullah Ab. Razak	7,358	63.65	▲63.65
BN	Nik Mustapha Nik Loding	4,202	36.35	▼6.85
Total valid votes		11,560	100.00	
Total rejected ballots		306		
Unreturned ballots		0		
Turnout		11,866	68.97	▲1.40
Registered electors		17,204		
Majority		3,156	27.30	▲13.70
PAS gain from S46		Swing		?

Kelantan state election, 1995: Gual Periok
Party	Candidate	Votes	%	∆%
S46	Nik Mustapha Nik Loding	6,135	56.80	▼5.26
BN	Abdul Rahman Awang	4,667	43.20	▲5.26
Total valid votes		10,802	100.00	
Total rejected ballots		367		
Unreturned ballots		51		
Turnout		11,220	67.57	▼6.42
Registered electors		16,606		
Majority		1,468	13.60	▼10.52
S46 hold		Swing		

Kelantan state election, 1990: Gual Periok
Party	Candidate	Votes	%	∆%
S46	Nik Mustapha Nik Loding	6,500	62.06	▲62.06
BN	Abdul Rahman Awang	3,974	37.94	▼15.71
Total valid votes		10,474	100.00	
Total rejected ballots		277		
Unreturned ballots		0		
Turnout		10,751	73.99	▲2.43
Registered electors		14,530		
Majority		2,526	24.12	▲16.82
S46 gain from BN		Swing		?

Kelantan state election, 1986: Gual Periok
Party	Candidate	Votes	%	∆%
BN	Abdul Rahman Awang	4,578	53.65	▲2.66
PAS	Daud Ab Raof	3,955	46.35	▼2.66
Total valid votes		8,533	100.00	
Total rejected ballots		242		
Unreturned ballots		0		
Turnout		8,775	71.56	▼5.62
Registered electors		12,262		
Majority		623	7.30	▲5.32
BN hold		Swing		

Kelantan state election, 1982: Gual Periok
Party	Candidate	Votes	%	∆%
BN	Zakaria Botok	3,660	50.99	▼7.34
PAS	Mohd. Saari Awang Ali	3,518	49.01	▲7.34
Total valid votes		7,178	100.00	
Total rejected ballots		96		
Unreturned ballots		0		
Turnout		7,274	77.19	▲1.92
Registered electors		9,424		
Majority		142	1.98	▼14.68
BN hold		Swing		

Kelantan state election, 1978: Gual Periok
Party	Candidate	Votes	%	∆%
BN	Hussein Ahmad	2,769	58.33	▼25.64
PAS	Hamzah Awang Hamat	1,978	41.67	▲41.67
Total valid votes		4,747	100.00	
Total rejected ballots		78		
Unreturned ballots		0		
Turnout		4,825	75.26	▲2.73
Registered electors		6,411		
Majority		791	16.66	▼51.27
BN hold		Swing		

Kelantan state election, 1974: Gual Periok
Party	Candidate	Votes	%
BN	Hussein Ahmad	3,677	83.97
Independent	Abd. Hamid Abd. Razak	702	16.03
Total valid votes		4,379	100.00
Total rejected ballots		294	
Unreturned ballots		0	
Turnout		4,673	72.53
Registered electors		6,443	
Majority		2,975	67.94
This was a new constituency created.
