= 2024 Mahkota by-election =

By-election in Malaysia in 2024

- 28 September 2024

N29 Mahkota seat in the Johor State Legislative Assembly
- Turnout: 53.84%
| | First party | Second party |
|---|---|---|
| | BN | PN |
| Candidate | Syed Hussien Syed Abdullah | Mohamad Haizan Jaafar |
| Party | UMNO | BERSATU |
| Alliance | BN | PN |
| Popular vote | 27,995 | 7,347 |
| Percentage | 79.21% | 20.79% |
Mahkota assemblyman before election
Sharifah Azizah Syed Zain (deceased)
Barisan Nasional (UMNO)
Elected Mahkota assemblyman
Syed Hussien Syed Abdullah
Barisan Nasional (UMNO)

The 2024 Mahkota by-election was a by-election for the Johor State Legislative Assembly seat of Mahkota that was held on 28 September 2024. It was called following the death of incumbent, Sharifah Azizah Syed Zain on 2 August 2024 from internal bleeding. Sharifah Azizah served as Member of the Johor State Legislative Assembly (MLA) for Penawar from 2018 to 2022 and for Mahkota from 2022.

Barisan Nasional's Syed Hussien Syed Abdullah defeated Perikatan Nasional's Mohamad Haizan Jaafar in a landslide, winning by a majority of 20,648 votes, leading in all polling districts, as well as early and postal votes.

== Nomination ==
On 17 August 2024, Pakatan Harapan (PH) Secretary-General Saifuddin Nasution Ismail confirmed that PH would not field a candidate, and instead giving way to Barisan Nasional (BN). On 7 September 2024, BN nominated Kluang UMNO Youth chief Syed Hussien Syed Abdullah as its candidate. Likewise, Perikatan Nasional (PN) nominated former Johor FA footballer and former Kluang football head coach Mohamad Haizan Jaafar as its candidate on 10 September 2024.

On Nomination Day, the race was confirmed to be a straight fight between Syed Hussein of BN and Mohamad Haizan of PN after nominations closed.

== Timeline ==
The key dates are listed below.

| Date | Event |
|---|---|
| 13 August 2024 | Issue of the Writ of Election |
| 14 September 2024 | Nomination Day |
| 14–27 September 2024 | Campaigning Period |
| 24 September 2024 | Early polling day for postal and overseas voters |
| 28 September 2024 | Polling Day |

== Results ==
Johor state by-election, 28 September 2024: Mahkota Upon the death of incumbent, Sharifah Azizah Syed Zain
| Party | Candidate | Votes | % | ∆% |
|---|---|---|---|---|
| BN | Syed Hussien Syed Abdullah | 27,995 | 79.21 | ▲33.35 |
| PN | Mohamad Haizan Jaafar | 7,347 | 20.79 | ▼0.23 |
| Total valid votes | | 35,342 | 98.98 | |
| Total rejected ballots | | 339 | 0.95 | |
| Unreturned ballots | | 24 | 0.07 | |
| Turnout | | 35,705 | 53.84 | ▼3.50 |
| Registered electors | | 66,318 | | |
| Majority | | 20,648 | 57.83 | ▲43.56 |
| BN hold | | Swing | | ? |

== Previous results ==
Johor state election, 2022: Mahkota
| Party | Candidate | Votes | % | ∆% |
|---|---|---|---|---|
| BN | Sharifah Azizah Syed Zain | 16,611 | 45.86 | ▲1.75 |
| PH | Muhammad Taqiuddin Cheman | 11,445 | 31.59 | ▼16.65 |
| PN | Mohamad Nor Lingan | 7,614 | 21.02 | ▲21.02 |
| Heritage | Mohamed Noor Suleiman | 555 | 1.53 | ▲1.53 |
| Total valid votes | | 36,225 | 97.08 | |
| Total rejected ballots | | 805 | 2.16 | |
| Unreturned ballots | | 286 | 0.77 | |
| Turnout | | 37,316 | 57.34 | ▼27.49 |
| Registered electors | | 65,074 | | |
| Majority | | 5,166 | 14.27 | ▲10.14 |
| BN gain from PH | | Swing | | ? |
Source(s) "RESULTS OF CONTESTED ELECTION AND STATEMENTS OF THE POLL AFTER THE OFFICIAL ADDITION OF VOTES" (PDF).
