= Kampung Boy (TV series) =

Malaysian animated television series

- Title card
- Genre: Comedy drama
- Created by: Lat
- Theme music composer: Dave Andrew; Farid Ali
- Country of origin: Malaysia
- Original languages: Malay (Malaysian release); English (International release)
- No. of seasons: 2
- No. of episodes: 26

Production
- Production locations: North America; Philippines
- Running time: 26 minutes
- Production companies: Lacewood Studio; Matinee Entertainment; Measat Broadcast Network Systems

Original release
- Network: Astro Ria; Astro Ceria
- Release: 14 September 1999 – 12 September 2000

Kampung Boy is a Malaysian animated television series broadcast from 14 September 1999 to 12 September 2000. It is about the adventures of a young boy, Mat, and his life in a kampung (village). The series is adapted from the best-selling graphical novel The Kampung Boy, an autobiography of Malaysian cartoonist Lat. Twenty-six episodes – one of which won an Annecy Award – were first shown on Malaysian satellite television network Astro before being distributed to sixty other countries.

A main theme of Kampung Boy is the contrast between the traditional rural way of life and the modern urban lifestyle. The series promotes the village lifestyle as an environment that is fun and conducive to the development of a healthy and intelligent child. It raises the issue of modernisation, proposing that new values and technologies should be carefully examined by a society before being accepted.

Lat's animation has won praises for its technical work and refreshing content, although questions have been raised by Southeast Asian audiences over its similarities to Western animation and its deviations from the local style of spoken English. Malaysian animation critics held up Kampung Boy as the standard to which their country's animators should aspire, and academics in cultural studies regarded the series as a method of using modern technologies and cultural practices to preserve Malaysian history.

== Origins ==
In 1979, the autobiographical graphic novel The Kampung Boy was published. The story of a young Malay boy's childhood in a kampung (village) proved to be a commercial and critical success, establishing its author Lat as the "most renowned cartoonist in Malaysia". The Kampung Boy's success prompted Lat to consider using other media to reach out to the masses.

The seeds for the animated adaptation of The Kampung Boy were sown in 1993 in a conversation between Lat and Ananda Krishnan, founder of Astro. Western and Japanese cartoons flooded the local television channels during the 1990s, and Lat decried those productions for violence and jokes that he considered unsuitable for Malaysia and its youths. Recognising that the younger generation preferred colourful animations over static black and white drawings, Lat was keen for a local animated series to promote local values among Malaysian children. After Krishnan's company offered Lat financial support to start an animation project, the cartoonist began plans to adapt his trademark comic to the television screen.

== Production ==
A frame from a Kampung Boy storyboard (from left to right): Ana, Mat, and Bo

Lat imagined several stories he wished to see in animated form, and then looked abroad for help producing them. Lacewood Studio in Ottawa, Canada, was in charge of animating the pilot episode. World Sports and Entertainment of Los Angeles was involved as well; Norman Singer organised the production and Gerald Tripp helped Lat to write the script. Bobdog Production was responsible for animating another five episodes. However, Krishnan and Lat were disappointed with the results, which had taken two years of work to produce. They thought the pilot was "slow-moving". Lat believed Lacewood had accommodated him too often during the production, accepting his input without question. They failed to inform him that although a slow pace worked for static cartoon drawings, a good animation was often "lively, fast-moving, full of action and fantasy".

In 1995 Lat and Krishnan engaged Matinee Entertainment to complete the project, and Lat started to fly back and forth between Kuala Lumpur and Los Angeles to work closely with Matinee's employees. His experience with Matinee's team of writers and animators was positive; they were more proactive than Lacewood's, brainstorming his ideas and turning them into viable scripts and storyboards. Director Frank Saperstein performed the final edit, polishing up the scripts. Lat, however, had the final say with regards to cultural depictions, overriding several suggestions such as characters kissing in front of others and the use of Western street slang, as these were unpalatable to the Malaysian public. He also enforced accuracy in the depictions of objects such as bullock carts, noting that the American artists thought Malaysian carts were identical to their Mexican counterparts.

The storyboards were translated into animations by the Philippine Animation Studio in Manila. Lat again took several trips, this time to the Philippines, to advise the animators and ensure that everything was depicted accurately. Once the animation had been completed, the prints were sent to Vietnam for processing. Finally, the films were delivered to Krishnan's studio in Kuala Lumpur for voice recording in English and Bahasa Malaysia. Like Lat, Saperstein flew back and forth among the involved countries to coordinate efforts and make sure production standards never dropped. Saperstein's efforts for his first twelve episodes were enough to convince Lat to continue working with Matinee for the project.

The entire project took four years to complete; each episode cost approximately 350,000 United States dollars (about one million Malaysian ringgit), partly funded by Measat, and took four to five months to produce. The pilot was shown over TV1 on 10 February 1997, and the series began its broadcast over Astro Ria two-and-a-half years later. Kinder Channel (Germany) and Teletoon (Canada) broadcast the series after buying the rights through London-based distributor Itel, and the series has been broadcast in more than sixty countries since its first airing in Malaysia. Measat expected to recover their investment in about ten years. Although Kampung Boy originated in Malaysia, most of its production took place abroad. It was local in concept, but could be construed as a foreign production in terms of animation. This led to laments that had Malaysian studios been hired to participate in animation work, the country's industry would have benefited by learning from foreign animation expertise and methodology.

== Characters ==
The protagonist of the series is a nine-year-old boy named Mat, who typically wears a sarong pelikat and a white singlet. Sporting a broad nose, small eyes, and untidy black hair, the short and rounded boy resembles his creator, Lat, as a child. Mat has a younger sister, Ana, and they live in a house with their father and mother, Yeop and Yah, respectively. Their nuclear family structure is predominant in the village. Yeop's mother, Opah, does not live with them but is often seen in their house. Also frequently appearing are Mat's buddies, Bo and Tak, whose names are components of the Malay word botak (bald). The two are styled after comic characters of traditional wayang kulit (shadow play); Bo is the more intelligent of the pair, while Tak has a tendency to be a show-off. Other supporting characters include Normah (a girl formerly from the city) and Mrs. Hew (Mat's teacher).

The Malay and English voices of the characters were dubbed by Malaysian voice actors. Child actors were employed for the younger roles; however, Mat, Ana, Bo, and Tak were voiced by actors who were in their early twenties. Certain actors had the task of voicing multiple roles; for example, the voice director was responsible for speaking the roles of Yah and Mrs. Hew. Initially, voice talents were hired in Los Angeles to dub the English version, but they "kept slipping into a Jamaican accent". Although this soundtrack was not used in the series, the producers felt it was too humorous to waste and included it in The Making of Kampung Boy, which was broadcast a week before the start of the series.

Character(s)	Voiced by	
Character(s)	Malay	English
Mat	Ashraf Adeeb Nur Aishah Othman	Ashraf Adeeb
Bo	Sharifah Shahirah	Lara Fabregas
Tak	Iedil Dzuhrie Alaudin Adiwayu Ansar Zainuddin	Premkumar Livadiveloo
Normah	Raja Akmar Raja Biazid	Anusha Eliz Peterson
Ana	Raphaela Lee Mei Joy Natasha Yusof	Samantha Tan
Yeop	Hafidzuddin Fazil	Kennedy John Michael
Yah	Rosediani Ahmad Nordin	Norina Yahya
Opah	Rosman Ishak	Mano Maniam
Tok Din	Zaibo (Zainal Ariffin Abdul Hamid)	Mano Maniam
Mrs. Hew	Norina Yahya	Norina Yahya
Mustapha	Zaibo Radhi Khalid	Zahim Albakri
Farouk	Colin Chong	Huzir Sulaiman

== Setting ==
Whereas Kampung Boy the comic book was based on life in the 1950s, its animation spin-off was set in the 1990s. Although the scenery and details are exaggerated, the animation is accurate in its depiction of the Malaysian village and the life of its inhabitants. Dr. Rohani Hashim, of Universiti Sains Malaysia's School of Communication, called the series a "detailed recreation of a rural Malay childhood". The layout of Mat's village and the style of its houses are patterned after those in the rural areas of Perak where clusters of houses line a river which provides water for the villagers' needs. The children play in the surrounding jungle, while the adults toil in the fields and commute to the city to work.

Saperstein directed the use of warm and soft colours in the series; this colour scheme was modelled after that of Winnie the Pooh, bestowing a "soft, cuddly feel", according to Far Eastern Economic Review journalist S. Jayasankaran, to the animation. Much of the show's visuals followed Lat's art style. Outlines are drawn in a bold manner, making objects stand out from the background – an effect particularly aided by the rich use of brown, green, and yellow as the dominant colours. The last two colours are heavily used in the depictions of nature, contrasting well with each other and separating the background from the middle ground. Aside from being the main colour for the houses, brown is used as the skin tone of the characters. Drawn with "short and round shapes", Mat and his fellow Malays are highlighted with bright colours.

== Themes and hallmarks ==
Kampung Boy's episodes follow a structure reminiscent of Hollywood cartoons. Each episode contains two separate stories whose themes interweave each other as the show switches between scenes of the two stories. By the end of the episode, the two threads are resolved by a common idea. Generally, one story focuses on the kampung children, and the other on the adults. The creators of Kampung Boy refrained from copying ideas commonly found in Western and Japanese cartoons. Other Malaysian animations produced since the 1990s have not been as meticulously faithful to portraying images and themes familiar to the locals. For example, Sang Wira's (1996) protagonist bears a striking resemblance to Doraemon, and the bear and bee in Ngat dan Taboh (2002) play out antics similar to those of Tom and Jerry. Lat's close involvement with the project kept its portrayals faithful to Malaysian culture. Kampung life in the animation features "true-blue Malaysian elements" such as supernatural superstitions (pontianaks or female vampires), monkeys trained to pluck coconuts, and traditions that are forgotten in the transition from rural to urban living.

The cartoon series explores ideas through the activities of the characters, especially their interactions with one another. Rohani classified the genre of the show as comedy drama. According to her, the main theme in Kampung Boy is nostalgia, carrying Lat's intention to portray rural childhood as a "much more interesting and creative" experience than growing up in an urban environment. Several episodes champion the kampung way of life. In "Antara Jaguh & Rakan" ("Between Champions or Friends") Mat and his friends defeat a city soccer team because of their toughness bred from doing hard work in the village. "Si Mat Manusia Pintar" ("Smart Like a Flying Fox") suggests that the unpolluted environment of the kampung promotes the upbringing of a healthier and more intelligent child. Normah arrives from the city in "Mat Main Wayang" ("The Shadow Knows"), and although she disdains the kampung initially, she is won over by the villagers' tenderness toward her.

The intrusion of modern technology and attitudes into this idyllic kampung way of life is also a main topic in the series. Several episodes introduce electrical appliances and ideas associated with urban lifestyles to the villagers. For example, the convenience of motor cars versus the traditional use of bullock carts is debated by the characters in "Naik Keretaku" ("Dad's Driving Test"). Despite the show's support of the kampung lifestyle, it portrays aspects of modern living in a positive light as well. Opah, an old woman, is depicted as a capable modern woman, proficient in driving a van and fixing televisions. The city is characterised as a gateway to a range of cultures and ideas that are not found in a Malaysian rural village, as illustrated in the encounter and formation of a friendship between Mat and a Chinese boy in "Naik Keretaku".

The series also explores changes in Malaysian rural society that had taken place during the 1950s to 1990s. For example, through flashbacks, "Yah, Kahwinkan Kami!" ("Well, Marry Us!") displays traditional marriage customs that are no longer practised by urban dwellers. Family ties are shown to be strong in the rural community – family members show close attention and concern to one another. Conversely, those who immersed themselves in city life are depicted to have lost their communal bonds. Although Mat's family is depicted to follow the rules of the Malay patriarchal society, modern values are in its portrayal. Yap does not leave the responsibilities of child-rearing all to Yah; he takes care of Ana while she watches over Mat. Although the series presents the female characters as housewives, it makes the point in "Nasib Si Gadis Desa" ("The Fate of a Village Girl") that the traditional family role of the Malay woman is as equal and valuable as the man's. The episode also mentions the achievements of women in careers such as space exploration and science.

Overall, Rohani said Lat's cartoon series was subtly recording a story of "rapidly vanishing Malay tradition and innocence", while advising viewers to consider the societal changes around them. According to her, the cartoonist's concern was to inspire the audience to consider the pace of urbanisation and to realise that the adoption or rejection of new values is a common decision by them. The show, in her opinion, suggests that changes should be carefully examined and adopted only if beneficial to the society. Furthermore, the adoption of new ideas and culture should be a gradual process, and the changes tailored accordingly to the society.

== Episodes ==
Season	Episodes	Originally released		
Season	Episodes	First released	Last released	Network
Pilot		February 10, 1997		TV1
1	13	September 14, 1999	December 7, 1999	Astro Ria
2	13	June 20, 2000	September 12, 2000	TV Asahi

== Reception, legacy, and achievements ==
Kampung Boy was submitted to the 1999 Annecy International Animated Film Festival in France. One of its episodes, "Oh, Tok!", won the Best Animation for a television series of 13 minutes and more. The episode was about a spooky banyan tree that became the object of Mat's fear. Because of the local contents in the animation and the nostalgic appeal of the kampung lifestyle, Malaysian comics scholar Muliyadi Mahamood expected success for Kampung Boy in his country.

The 26-episode series was popular with the young and received positive reviews for technical details and content. It has also attracted criticism for similarities to United States cartoon series The Simpsons; audiences noticed that Mat's Malaysian family was similar in several ways to Bart Simpson's dysfunctional American family. Similarly, some critics pointed out that the English spoken in Kampung Boy is substantially different from Malaysian English, which is heavily influenced by British English; reporter Daryl Goh perceived an American accent to the English-language voices. Lat explained that the producers had to tone down the use of "traditional Malay customs, locales and language" to market the series to a wider global audience. Rohani found the decision "regrettable"; it made the animation less than an authentic Malay product.

The animation was regarded by Dr. Paulette Dellios, of Bond University's School of Humanities and Social Sciences, as a cultural artefact: a reminder and preservation of a country's old way of life, created and produced by an international team, and displayed via modern technologies to the world. According to Rohani, Kampung Boy was a record of Malay traditions and transitions experienced by the rural community during the 1950s to 1990s. Among the several Malaysian animations that used local settings, Lat's series was in veteran film director Hassan Abdul Muthalib's view the best in portraying the country's culture and traditions; Hassan also said that the success in marketing the series overseas made Kampung Boy the benchmark for Malaysia's animation industry.

== Bibliography ==
Interviews/self-introspectives

- Campbell, Eddie; Lat (subject) (15 January 2007). "Campbell Interviews Lat: Part 3". First Hand Books – Doodles and Dailies. New York, United States: First Second Books. Archived from the original on 23 June 2008.
- Lat (2001). "Vignette: Notes of a Cartoonist Temporarily Turned Animator". In Lent, John (ed.). Animation in Asia and the Pacific. Indiana, United States: Indiana University Press. pp. 153–154. ISBN 0-253-34035-7.

Academic sources

- Dellios, Paulette (2000). "Museums in the Global 'Kampung': Mixed Messages". Culture Mandala: The Bulletin of the Centre for East-West Cultural and Economic Studies. 4 (1). Queensland, Australia: Bond University: 1–8. ISSN 1322-6916. Archived from the original on 3 November 2013.
- Lent, John (2008). "Asian Animation and Its Search for National Identity and Global Markets 1". ASIFA Magazine: The International Animation Journal. Vol. 21, no. 1. Hertfordshire, United Kingdom: John Libbey Publishing. pp. 31–41.
- Muliyadi Mahamood (2001). "The History of Malaysian Animated Cartoons". In Lent, John (ed.). Animation in Asia and the Pacific. Indiana, United States: Indiana University Press. pp. 131–152. ISBN 0-253-34035-7.
- Rohani Hashim (2005). "Lat's Kampong Boy: Rural Malays in Tradition and Transition". In Palmer, Edwina (ed.). Asian Futures, Asian Traditions. Kent, United Kingdom: Global Oriental. pp. 389–400. ISBN 1-901903-16-8.
- Hassan Abdullah Muthalib (June 2007). "From Mousedeer to Mouse: Malaysian Animation at the Crossroads". Inter-Asia Cultural Studies: Southeast Asian Cinema. 8 (2). Hong Kong: 288–297. doi:10.1080/14649370701238755. ISSN 1464-9373. S2CID 54991062. IDNumber: 512199.

Journalistic sources

- Chandran, Sheela (10 July 2005). "Smile with Shiera". The Star. Selangor, Malaysia: Star Publications. Archived from the original on 19 August 2010.
- Crossings: Datuk Lat (Television production). Singapore: Discovery Networks Asia. 21 September 2003.
- DeMott, Rick (9 November 2004). "Nick Asia To Air Annecy Winning Kampung Boy". AWN.com. Los Angeles, United States: Animation World Network. Archived from the original on 18 August 2010.
- Goh, Daryl (27 August 1999). "Lat's of Village People". The Star. Selangor, Malaysia: Star Publications. Archived from the original on 13 February 2005.
- Haliza Ahmad (19 August 1999a). "'Kampung Boy' Arrives". Malay Mail. Kuala Lumpur, Malaysia. p. 11. ProQuest 326156898.
- Haliza Ahmad (24 December 1999b). "Annecy Awards '99 for Lat's Kampung Boy". Malay Mail. Kuala Lumpur, Malaysia. p. 15. ProQuest 326120280.
- Haliza Ahmad (24 July 2000). "Voices Behind Kampung Boy Characters". Malay Mail. Kuala Lumpur, Malaysia. p. 23. ProQuest 326158346.
- Jayasankaran, S (22 July 1999). "Going Global". Far Eastern Economic Review. 162 (29). Hong Kong: 35–36. ISSN 0014-7591. ProQuest 208233691.
- Manavalan, Theresa (4 July 1999). "Kampung Boy Hits Big Time". New Sunday Times. Kuala Lumpur, Malaysia. p. 10. ProQuest 266437109.
- "Lat Cartoon Series to Debut on Astro TV". New Straits Times. Kuala Lumpur, Malaysia. 26 November 1996. p. 9. ProQuest 269096934.
- "More than a Cartoonist". Annual Business Economic and Political Review: Malaysia. 2 (Emerging Malaysia 2007). Kuala Lumpur, Malaysia: Oxford Business Group: 257–258. January 2007. ISSN 1755-232X. Archived from the original on 15 July 2011.
- Seneviratne, Kalinga (12 December 2002). "Asia's Animation Industry Spreads Its Wings". Asia Times. Hong Kong. Inter Press Service. Archived from the original on 17 November 2004.
- "'Unhealthy' Elements Invading Local Cartoon Industry, Says Lat". Financial Times. Kuala Lumpur: Financial Times Group. Bernama. 7 February 2004. p. 1. ProQuest 447834102.
