= Silat Legenda =

1998 Malaysian animated film

- Theatrical release poster
- Directed by: Hassan Muthalib
- Screenplay by: Hassan Muthalib; Hisham Harun Hashim; Nik Othman Ariff Kamil
- Produced by: Hisham Harun Hashim
- Starring: Noor Kumalasari; M. Amin; Othman Hafsham; Hamid Gurkha; Jalaluddin Hassan; Razali S. Buyong; Ayie Ibrahim; Kamal Effendi; Mohd Rizal; Rafidei Mohamad; Sham Yunus
- Edited by: Elias Mydin
- Music by: Sha'aban Yahya
- Production company: Peninsula Pictures Sdn Bhd
- Distributed by: Peninsula Pictures Sdn Bhd
- Release date: August 27, 1998 (Malaysia)
- Running time: 78 minutes
- Country: Malaysia
- Language: Malay
- Budget: RM 5-6 million
- Box office: RM 141,700

Silat Legenda (Silat Legend) is a 1998 Malaysian animated fantasy adventure film directed by Hassan Muthalib and produced by Peninsula Pictures Sdn. Bhd. The film is recognised as Malaysia's first full-length animated feature film and was the most expensive Malaysian film produced at the time of its release.

== Synopsis ==
In 15th-century Malacca, two silat exponents, Seleman and Mona, train under the same grandmaster and compete for the right to become custodians of five powerful mystical weapons—a sword, armband, shield, whip, and staff. Although Mona is the more technically skilled fighter, she abuses her knowledge and seeks to use the weapons for selfish and destructive purposes. Recognizing Seleman’s wisdom and discipline, the grandmaster entrusts the weapons to him instead. Enraged by the decision, Mona vows revenge and turns to dark sorcery and black magic in an attempt to seize the weapons, but ultimately fails.

Seleman later becomes an adviser to the Sultan of Malacca and entrusts the mystical weapons to five warriors to maintain law and order throughout the realm. Once peace is restored, the weapons are returned to Seleman. Anticipating Mona’s eventual return, he transforms the weapons into five miniature kris and conceals them in a cave on Mount Ledang. Deprived of the weapons, Mona is placed into a long state of suspended animation, destined to awaken only when the weapons are rediscovered.

Centuries later, in 21st-century Malacca, five boys who share a passion for silat and the legendary warriors of old Malacca—such as Hang Tuah and his companions—chance upon an ancient book that leads them to the cave on Mount Ledang. There, they uncover the five kris, which have remained hidden for more than 500 years. While examining the kris using a computer in their clubhouse, a holographic image of Seleman appears and reveals that the kris are in fact mystical weapons capable of transforming their bearers into the Legendary Warriors of Silat.

The boys accept the challenge and activate the weapons, unknowingly awakening Mona from her long slumber. Determined to reclaim what she believes is rightfully hers, Mona resumes her quest for power. After her two minions fail to seize the weapons, she enlists the help of Professor Keefli, a modern-day scientist. Unable to locate the weapons unless they are actively used, Mona and Professor Keefli devise a plan to lure the Legendary Warriors into revealing themselves. Guided by Seleman, the boys are instructed to seek Tok Guru Pujangga and must confront the combined forces of ancient sorcery and modern science to prevent chaos from once again engulfing Malacca.

== Voice cast ==
- Noorkumalasari as Mona - a silat master practising black magic and main antagonist.
- Karim Latiff as Tun Seleman / Pak Leman – a 15th-century silat master who safeguards the mystical weapons.
- Othman Hafsham as Prof. Keefli – a scientist who assists Mona in her plans.
- M. Amin as Tok Guru Pujangga – a silat master and mentor to the five boys.
- Ayie Ibrahim as Zack / Hang Tuah – the leader of the Warriors’ Club; wields the sword (sundang).
- Kamal Effendi Md. Kamal as Dino / Hang Jebat – athletic student; inherits the arm band (sanggang).
- Mohd Rizal Karman as Roy / Hang Kasturi – intelligent student; wields the shield (perisai).
- Rafidei Mohamad as Burn / Hang Lekir – cheerful student; wields the whip (cemeti).
- Sham Yunus as Jefri / Hang Lekiu – calm student; wields the staff (pancang).
- Nurul Alis as Ema – Zack’s younger sister, adventurous but not part of the club.
- Hamid Gurkha as Mo – a monkey transformed by Mona, assisting her minions.
- Ahmad Nizam as Ewak / Biawak – a warrior transformed into a reptilian creature serving Mona.
- Puteri Nor as Tuti – supporting character (friend/associate of the boys).
- Jalaluddin Hassan as lecturer.
- Razali Buyong as Burn’s father.
- Ismail Din as Zack’s father and Internet voice-over.
- Ramli Abu Bakar as the storyteller/narrator of the film.
- Farid Amirul as young version of Tun Seleman in flashbacks.
- Siti Nurbaya Ahmadiah as young Mona in flashbacks and Zack’s mother.

== Production ==
The idea for an animated project emerged in early 1995 following discussions between producer Hisham Harun Hashim and animator-director Hassan Muthalib. Their decision to pursue animation was reinforced after attending the Annecy International Animation Film Festival in France in June 1995. Originally conceived as a television series, the project was later expanded into a feature-length film for wider distribution. The screenplay was written by Hassan, Hisham Harun, and Nik Othman Ariff Kamil and followed Joseph Campbell Hero’s Journey paradigm.

The film draws heavily on Malay history and folklore, incorporating the traditional martial art of silat and stories from the Malacca Sultanate, with particular inspiration from the legendary warrior Hang Tuah. The film’s design highlighted Malay culture, including traditional dress, the kris as a weapon, symbolic landscapes such as Mount Ledang, and references to historical and spiritual elements.The concept was further developed by art director Mohd Fazly Abdullah.

Production spanned more than 3 years at a cost exceeding RM 5–6 million. It involved approximately 200 artists across hand-drawn animation, digital art, graphic design, and technical work. According to the producer, approximately 99% of the film was made in Malaysia. Production took place in four workstations in Peninsula Digitan's studios, with some background painting done in Jakarta, Indonesia, and Manila, Philippines. For background painting, artists were guided by the watercolour style of Kazuo Oga, the concept artist for Hayao Miyazaki films, and were inspired by films such as My Neighbor Totoro (1988) and Princess Mononoke (1997).

The film blends 2D and 3D animation and was influenced by Japanese and Disney animation styles. The production faced technical challenges due to limited local experience, losing approximately 250,000 drawings and requiring recreation of 100–200 scenes. Voice recording was done before animation, requiring careful synchronisation.

== Release and reception ==
The film was officially launched on 20 August 1998 by Prime Minister Datuk Seri Dr. Mahathir Mohamad at Merdeka Hall, Putra World Trade Centre, and was released to the public on 27 August 1998. It was distributed by Peninsula Pictures Sdn Bhd.

=== International release ===
Silat Legenda was also released in Singapore, with plans for international distribution in Brunei, Indonesia, Japan, Philippines, and selected Western countries, supported by an English-language dub for wider audiences.

=== Box office ===
Despite extensive marketing efforts, Silat Legenda grossed only RM141,700 at the box office and did not recover its production costs.

=== Marketing ===
Peninsula Pictures allocated approximately RM1 million for marketing and promotion. Campaigns included planned carnivals, treasure hunts, school outreach programmes, and the provision of free transportation for children in rural areas to attend screenings. Merchandise included mugs, caps, and T-shirts.

As part of the promotional campaign, The Making of Silat Legenda, a behind-the-scenes feature highlighting the animation process, voice acting, and soundtrack production, was released. A dedicated website launched in July 1998 and reportedly received 1,500 international enquiries even before its official launched.

=== Critical reception ===
Critical response to Silat Legenda was mixed upon release, with several reviewers expressing disappointment despite acknowledging its historical significance. Marina Abdul Ghani of The Malay Mail wrote that “Silat Legenda, the country’s first animated film, is a less than mesmerising effort despite being a big-budget production.”

Roslen Fadzil of Harian Metro commented, “If you expect this film to be on the level of The Lion King or Mulan, you will be disappointed. However, Silat Legenda is not as weak as television cartoons such as Usop Sontorian or productions by Filem Negara.”

A. Wahab Hamzah of Utusan Malaysia awarded the film a B rating, describing it as a bold and creative first effort. He praised its cultural themes and sound design, particularly the use of Dolby Digital Surround, while noting shortcomings in animation quality when compared to international productions.

== Soundtrack ==
The film’s original soundtrack, Silat Legenda, was released in June 1998 by KRU Records and EMI Music Malaysia. The film’s score was composed and conducted by Sha'aban Yahya.

== Accolades ==
Award	Category	Nominee(s)	Result	Ref.
43rd Asia Pacific Film Festival (1998)	Official Selection	Silat Legenda	Nominated	
14th Malaysia Film Festival (1999)	Best New Director (Pengarah Harapan)	Hassan Muthalib	Nominated	
14th Malaysia Film Festival (1999)	Special Jury Award (First animated film)	Silat Legenda	Won	

== Legacy ==
Following Silat Legenda, director Hassan Muthalib planned an animated film about Panglima Awang, a renowned Malay navigator, intended for international audiences, but the project was ultimately not pursued.
