= Kukup (state constituency) =

Political subdivision in Malaysia

Kukup (N56)
Johor constituency

State constituency
- Legislature: Johor State Legislative Assembly
MLA
Md Israk Abdullah
BN
- Constituency created: 1973
- First contested: 1974
- Last contested: 2026

Demographics
- Population (2020): 39,829
- Electors (2026): 34,968
- Area (km²): 274

Kukup is a state constituency in Johor, Malaysia, that is represented in the Johor State Legislative Assembly.

The state constituency was first contested in 1974 and is mandated to return a single Assemblyman to the Johor State Legislative Assembly under the first-past-the-post voting system.

== Demographics ==
As of 2020, Kukup has a population of 39,829 people.

Ethnic breakdown of Kukup's electorate as of 2026
1. Malay (60.5%)
2. Chinese (36.8%)
3. Other ethnicities (1.80%)
4. Indian (0.90%)

== History ==
=== Polling districts ===
According to the gazette issued on 2 July 2026, the Kukup constituency has a total of 16 polling districts.

State constituency	Poling Districts	Code	Location
Kukup (N56)	Ladang Sungai Burong	165/56/01	SK Jeram Batu
Kukup (N56)	Jalan Rimba Terjun	165/56/02	SJK (C) Bin Chong
Kukup (N56)	Kampong Duku	165/56/03	SJK (C) Cheow Min
Kukup (N56)	Kampong Rimba Terjun	165/56/04	SK Rimba Terjun
Kukup (N56)	Parit Hj. Ismail	165/56/05	SK Sungai Bunyi
Kukup (N56)	Rambah	165/56/06	SK Rambah
Kukup (N56)	Parit Rambai	165/56/07	SK Parit Rambai
Kukup (N56)	Peradin	165/56/08	SK Belokok
Kukup (N56)	Telok Kerang	165/56/09	SK Telok Kerang
Kukup (N56)	Penerok	165/56/10	SK Penerok
Kukup (N56)	Sungai Boh	165/56/11	SK Sungai Boh
Kukup (N56)	Bandar Permas Kechil	165/56/12	SJK (C) Pei Chiao
Kukup (N56)	Permas Kechil	165/56/13	SMK Sri Kukup
Kukup (N56)	Sungai Durian	165/56/14	SK Sungai Durian
Kukup (N56)	Serkat	165/56/15	SK Serkat
Kukup (N56)	Andek Mori	165/56/16	SK Andek Mori

=== Representation history ===
Members of the Legislative Assembly for Kukup
Assembly	No	Years	Member	Party
Constituency created from Pontian Kechil and Pontian Dalam
4th	N28	1974-1978	Abdullah Sudin	BN (UMNO)
5th	N28	1978-1982	Abdullah Sudin	BN (UMNO)
6th	N28	1982-1986	Ahmad Abdullah	BN (UMNO)
7th	N36	1986-1990	Ahmad Abdullah	BN (UMNO)
8th	N36	1990-1995	Ahmad Abdullah	BN (UMNO)
9th	N40	1995-1999	Ahmad Abdullah	BN (UMNO)
10th	N40	1999-2004	Jamilah Endan	BN (UMNO)
11th	N56	2004-2008	Jamilah Endan	BN (UMNO)
12th	N56	2008-2013	Md Othman Yusof	BN (UMNO)
13th	N56	2013-2018	Suhaimi Salleh	BN (UMNO)
14th	N56	2018-2022	Md Othman Yusof	BN (UMNO)
15th	N56	2022–2026	Jefridin Atan	BN (UMNO)
16th	N56	2026-present	Md Israk Abdullah	BN (UMNO)

== Election results ==
Johor state election, 2026
Party	Candidate	Votes	%	∆%
BN	Md Israk Abdullah	18,399	72.31	▲11.94
PH	Cheah Chee Hong	7,045	27.69	▲10.70
Total valid votes		25,444	100.00	
Total rejected ballots		313		
Unreturned ballots		21		
Turnout		25,778	73.72	▲16.48
Registered electors		34,968		
Majority		11,354	44.62	▲2.09
BN hold		Swing		

Johor state election, 2022
Party	Candidate	Votes	%	∆%
BN	Jefridin Atan	11,640	60.37	▲10.77
PN	Mahathir Iskandar Muhammad	3,439	17.84	▲17.84
PH	Zaiful Bakri	3,276	16.99	▲16.99
PEJUANG	Zam Zam Hashim	927	4.81	▲4.81
Total valid votes		19,282	97.29	
Total rejected ballots		455	2.30	
Unreturned ballots		82	0.41	
Turnout		19,819	57.24	▼27.69
Registered electors		34,624		
Majority		8,201	42.53	▲38.69
BN hold		Swing		

Johor state election, 2018
Party	Candidate	Votes	%	∆%
BN	Md Othman Yusof	11,113	49.60	▼21.55
PKR	Suhaizan Kayat	10,251	45.76	▲45.76
PAS	Karim Deraman	1,040	4.64	▼16.08
Total valid votes		22,404	97.99	
Total rejected ballots		422	1.85	
Unreturned ballots		37	0.16	
Turnout		22,863	84.93	▼2.07
Registered electors		26,920		
Majority		862	3.84	▼38.46
BN hold		Swing		

Johor state election, 2013
Party	Candidate	Votes	%	∆%
BN	Suhaimi Salleh	11,682	71.15	▼11.69
PAS	Ghazaley Ayiub	4,736	28.85	▲11.69
Total valid votes		16,418	97.28	
Total rejected ballots		426	2.52	
Unreturned ballots		33	0.20	
Turnout		16,877	87.00	▲10.09
Registered electors		19,389		
Majority		6,946	42.30	▼23.38
BN hold		Swing		
Source(s) "KEPUTUSAN PILIHAN RAYA UMUM DEWAN UNDANGAN NEGERI".

Johor state election, 2008
Party	Candidate	Votes	%	∆%
BN	Md Othman Yusof	10,897	82.84	▼4.97
PAS	Ahmad Sani Kemat	2,258	17.16	▲4.97
Total valid votes		13,155	96.69	
Total rejected ballots		450	3.31	
Unreturned ballots		0	0.00	
Turnout		13,605	76.91	▲1.08
Registered electors		17,689		
Majority		8,639	65.68	▼9.94
BN hold		Swing		
Source(s) "KEPUTUSAN PILIHAN RAYA UMUM DEWAN UNDANGAN NEGERI PERAK BAGI TAHUN 2008".

Johor state election, 2004
Party	Candidate	Votes	%	∆%
BN	Jamilah Endan	11,544	87.81	▲6.93
PAS	Ahmad Sani Kemat	1,603	12.19	▲12.19
Total valid votes		13,147	96.48	
Total rejected ballots		479	3.52	
Unreturned ballots		0	0.00	
Turnout		13,626	75.83	▲2.05
Registered electors		17,968		
Majority		9,941	75.62	▲13.86
BN hold		Swing		
Source(s) "KEPUTUSAN PILIHAN RAYA UMUM DEWAN UNDANGAN NEGERI PERAK BAGI TAHUN 2004".

Johor state election, 1999
Party	Candidate	Votes	%	∆%
BN	Jamilah Endan	16,680	80.88	▼11.45
PKR	Rosdan Abdul Rahman	3,944	19.12	▲19.12
Total valid votes		20,624	96.31	
Total rejected ballots		775	3.62	
Unreturned ballots		15	0.07	
Turnout		21,414	73.78	▼0.89
Registered electors		29,023		
Majority		12,736	61.76	▼22.90
BN hold		Swing		
Source(s) "KEPUTUSAN PILIHAN RAYA UMUM DEWAN UNDANGAN NEGERI PERAK BAGI TAHUN 1999".

Johor state election, 1995
Party	Candidate	Votes	%	∆%
BN	Ahmad Abdullah	17,731	92.33	▲22.53
PAS	Mohd Amin Ghazali	1,472	7.67	▲7.67
Total valid votes		19,203	95.78	
Total rejected ballots		812	4.05	
Unreturned ballots		34	0.17	
Turnout		20,049	74.67	▼0.38
Registered electors		26,849		
Majority		16,259	84.66	▲45.06
BN hold		Swing		
Source(s) "KEPUTUSAN PILIHAN RAYA UMUM DEWAN UNDANGAN NEGERI PERAK BAGI TAHUN 1995".

Johor state election, 1990
Party	Candidate	Votes	%	∆%
BN	Ahmad Abdullah	12,255	69.80	▲4.27
S46	Salleh Bajuri	5,302	30.20	▼4.27
Total valid votes		17,557	94.45	
Total rejected ballots		1,031	5.55	
Unreturned ballots		0	0.00	
Turnout		18,588	75.05	▼0.79
Registered electors		24,768		
Majority		6,953	39.60	▲8.54
BN hold		Swing		{{{2}}}
Source(s) "KEPUTUSAN PILIHAN RAYA UMUM DEWAN UNDANGAN NEGERI PERAK BAGI TAHUN 1990".

Johor state election, 1986
Party	Candidate	Votes	%	∆%
BN	Ahmad Abdullah	11,313	65.53	▼1.22
DAP	Tam Lian Kun	5,952	34.47	▲1.22
Total valid votes		17,265	100.00	
Total rejected ballots		642		
Unreturned ballots		0		
Turnout		17,907	75.84	▼2.15
Registered electors		23,612		
Majority		5,361	31.05	▼2.45
BN hold		Swing		
Source(s) "KEPUTUSAN PILIHAN RAYA UMUM DEWAN UNDANGAN NEGERI PERAK BAGI TAHUN 1986".

Johor state election, 1982
Party	Candidate	Votes	%	∆%
BN	Ahmad bin Abdullah	14,221	66.75	▼24.53
DAP	Tan Kim Chiew	7,084	33.25	▲33.25
Total valid votes		21,305	100.00	
Total rejected ballots		320		
Unreturned ballots		0		
Turnout		21,625	77.99	▼1.77
Registered electors		27,727		
Majority		7,137	33.50	▼49.06
BN hold		Swing		

Johor state election, 1978
Party	Candidate	Votes	%	∆%
BN	Abdullah Sudin	15,568	91.28	
PAS	Abu Bakar Baharudin	1,487	8.72	
Total valid votes		17,055	100.00	
Total rejected ballots		1,008		
Unreturned ballots		0		
Turnout		18,063	79.76	
Registered electors		22,647		
Majority		14,081	82.56	
BN hold		Swing		

Johor state election, 1974
Party	Candidate	Votes	%
On the nomination day, Abdullah Sudin won uncontested.
BN	Abdullah Sudin		
Total valid votes			
Total rejected ballots			
Unreturned ballots			
Turnout			
Registered electors		19,216	
Majority			
This was a new constituency created.
