= Usop Sontorian =

Malaysian television series

- Title card, displaying the then-new logo of the series.
- Genre: Animation; Comedy; Drama
- Created by: Ujang
- Developed by: Kamn Ismail; Ujang
- Written by: Hood Yusof; Lutfi Ismail; Azizi Hj. Adnan
- Directed by: Kamn Ismail
- Voices of: Farriz Izwan Khairulanuar; Faisal Hairie Khairulanuar; Faizal Haredz Mohd Johari; Kamn Ismail; Zaharah Jidin; Dielfitri Tajudin; Ruslan Ayob; Ahmad Nazri Mahmood; Marzuki Abdullah; Azhar Saad; Wan Ayumi Wan Yusof; Syed Rahiman; Norwati Ismail; Sharifuddin Abdul Rashid; Mohd Akib Junid; Adzlan Sulong
- Theme music composer: Produksi Rakam Zalikamari
- Opening theme: "Usop Sontorian"
- Ending theme: "Usop Sontorian"
- Composer: Zalikamari
- Country of origin: Malaysia
- Original language: Malay
- No. of seasons: 3
- No. of episodes: 50

Production
- Executive producer: Michael Lum
- Producer: Othman Yusof
- Editors: Amisyahril Edwan Amran; Azlina Din; Khairudin Shabudin
- Running time: 22-23 minutes
- Production company: Kharisma Pictures

Original release
- Network: RTM
- Release: 27 January 1996 – 5 April 1997

Usop Sontorian (Note: Sometimes misspelled as Usop Santorian on some print medias.) is a Malaysian animated cartoon series aired on TV1 from 1996 to 1997. The country's first animated series, it was created by Ujang and produced by Kharisma Pictures. The series was directed by Kamn Ismail, who was also the voice actor for one of the series' characters.

Ismail was the managing director of Quest Animations until his death in 2019. Ujang, the series' creator, was not permitted to create any cartoon characters which have similarities to Usop Sontorian, after a failed legal battle to acquire rights to the character. After the series demise and Kharisma Pictures' closure in 1997, many of the production team were switched to different animation companies while others become full-time cartoonist for magazines Ujang and APO?, both under Kharisma Publications (renamed to MOY Publications). A feature film based on the series was originally planned in 1996 and slated for 2000 release, which eventually cancelled.

== Overview ==
Usop Sontorian is created by Malaysian cartoonist, Ibrahim Anon or Ujang as he affectionately known, with the concepts, storyline and script all done by him. In an exclusive interview with New Straits Times in December 1993, Ujang describes the anticipated production as a Malaysianised version of The Simpsons, stating that: "It is basically about a Malay family and their culture". Together with series director Kamn Ismail, he took charge of the technical aspects. By March 1993, Ujang teamed up with a group of layout artists and animators to work on the series. Usop Sontorian was made as a comic strip within the Ujang magazine and later as a standalone magazine before its TV series was produced. Malaysian public broadcaster, Radio Televisyen Malaysia (RTM) acquire the broadcast rights of the series with Eurofine handling the distribution.

== Synopsis ==
Usop Sontorian tells the story of the village life of Malaysian boy, Usop and his friends Abu, Dol, Ah Kim, Vellu, and Singh. Usop is the third and youngest child in his family. He has two elder siblings: a sister, Kak Kiah, and a jobless brother named Abang Budin. The story is set in Kampung Parit Sonto, not far from the town of Ayer Hitam, Johor; hence the name "Sontorian". The theme of the series was to promote unity and harmonious relationships between all races in multi-ethnic Malaysia.

== Characters ==
=== Main ===
- Usop – voiced by Farriz Izwan Khairulanuar
- Abu – voiced by Faizal Hairie Khairulanuar
- Dol – voiced by Faizal Haredz Mohd Johari

=== Recurring ===
- Singh – voiced by Ruslan Ayob
- Sashi Veloo – voiced by Marzuki Abdullah in some episodes and by Ameirkhannaz Mohammed in "Anugerah"
- Ah Kim – voiced by Ahmad Nazri Mahmood / Simon Tee Chee Ming
- Pak Mat (Usop's father) – voiced by Kamn Ismail and Azrinorhadi Che Din in some episodes, also voiced by Syed Rahiman in "Lawan Bola" and Yahya Khalid in "Tetamu"
- Mak Som (Usop's mother) – voiced by Zaharah Jidin
- Kak Kiah (Usop's sister) – voiced by Norwati Ismail
- Abang Budin (Usop's brother) – voiced by Dielfitri Tajudin / Husaini Jusoh / Ruslan Ayob
- Abu's father – voiced by Ahmad Dzulkarnain Adnan
- Abu's mother – voiced by Wan Ayumi Wan Yusof
- Dol's grandfather – voiced by Norhairil Azwa Abd Aziz
- Dol's grandmother – voiced by Mazian Joary
- Singh's father – voiced by Azhar Ahmad

=== Other characters ===
- Selebet (Usop's pet chicken), Salleh and Abu's younger brother – voiced by Azhar Saad
- Lan – voiced by Zulkefli Mohd Yusof
- Jeff – voiced by Norhaili Ithnin
- Saidon – voiced by Raja Zaharuddin Shah Raja Chik
- Saodah – voiced by Sherinaazlin Bakar
- Seipun – voiced by Adzlan Sulong

== Episodes ==
Although Usop Sontorian started airing in 1996, all of the episodes were already produced between 1993 and 1996. During its run, the series spanned 3 seasons and 50 episodes. All episodes directed by Kamn Ismail.

Season	Episodes	Originally released	
Season	Episodes	First released	Last released
1	18	January 27, 1996	June 1, 1996
2	16	August 3, 1996	November 23, 1996
3	16	December 21, 1996	April 5, 1997

=== Season 1 (1996) ===
No. overall	No. in series	Title	Storyboarded by (Note: Information is taken from the opening and ending credits of each episode.)	Written by	Original release date
1	1	"Lari Dari Rumah"	TBA	Ujang	January 27, 1996
2	2	"Kawan Baru"	Ujang	Ujang	February 3, 1996
3	3	"Main Gitar"	TBA	Ujang	February 10, 1996
4	4	"Tetamu Istimewa (Note: Episodes which have different background music in the ending credits instead of the main theme music.)"	TBA	Ujang	February 17, 1996
5	5	"Selebet"	TBA	Ujang	February 24, 1996
6	6	"Dol Pindah"	TBA	Ujang	March 2, 1996
7	7	"Basikal Tua"	TBA	Ujang	March 9, 1996
8	8	"Lampu Ajaib"	TBA	Ujang	March 16, 1996
9	9	"Melawat Kuala Lumpur"	Soul Hj. Ghazali; Ariyon Ahmad; Mubarak Yahya	Ujang	March 23, 1996
10	10	"Berkhemah"	TBA	Ujang	March 30, 1996
11	11	"Pendekar"	TBA	Ujang	April 6, 1996
12	12	"Meriam Buloh"	TBA	Ujang	April 20, 1996
13	13	"Bermain Rakit"	TBA	Ujang	April 27, 1996
14	14	"Olahragawan"	TBA	Ujang	May 4, 1996
15	15	"Anak Gajah"	TBA	Ujang	May 11, 1996
16	16	"Burung Kakak Tua"	TBA	Ujang	May 18, 1996
17	17	"Budin Masuk Lokap"	TBA	Ujang	May 25, 1996
18	18	"Budin Ke Kuala Lumpur"	Ujang	Ujang	June 1, 1996

=== Season 2 (1996) ===
No. overall	No. in series	Title	Storyboarded by	Written by	Original release date
19	1	"Sayang Kak Kiah"	Ariyon Ahmad	Ujang	August 3, 1996
20	2	"Usahawan Muda"	Ariyon Ahmad	Ujang	August 10, 1996
21	3	"Perang Bintang"	Soul Hj. Ghazali	Ujang	August 17, 1996
22	4	"Budak Jahat"	Ruslan Ayob	Ujang	August 24, 1996
23	5	"Hantu Parit Sonto"	Ahmad Kamil Othman	Ujang	August 31, 1996
24	6	"Kartini Selamanya"	Azhar Ahmad	Azhar Ahmad	September 7, 1996
25	7	"Pendekar II"	Soul Hj. Ghazali	Ujang	September 14, 1996
26	8	"Sakit Gigi"	Soul Hj. Ghazali	Lutfi Ismail	September 21, 1996
27	9	"U.F.O."	Ruslan Ayob	Ujang	September 28, 1996
28	10	"Lawan Bola"	Mubarak Yahya	Ujang	October 5, 1996
29	11	"Anugerah"	Ahmad Kamil Othman	Ujang	October 19, 1996
30	12	"Abu Oh Abu"	Ariyon Ahmad	Ujang	October 26, 1996
31	13	"Superhero"	Soul Hj. Ghazali	Ujang	November 2, 1996
32	14	"Temberang"	Ruslan Ayob	Ujang	November 9, 1996
33	15	"Tetamu"	Mubarak Yahya	Ujang	November 16, 1996
34	16	"Ketua Kelas"	Ahmad Kamil Othman	Ujang	November 23, 1996

=== Season 3 (1996–1997) ===
No. overall	No. in series	Title	Storyboarded by	Written by	Original release date
35	1	"Dunia Air"	Ruslan Ayob	Azizi Adnan	December 21, 1996
36	2	"Dinasor"	Soul Hj. Ghazali	Azizi Adnan	December 28, 1996
37	3	"Kisah Seorang Biduan"	Soul Hj. Ghazali	Azizi Adnan	January 4, 1997
38	4	"Berkhatan"	Ruslan Ayob	Azizi Adnan	January 11, 1997
39	5	"Seipun"	Ahmad Kamil Othman	Azizi Adnan	January 18, 1997
40	6	"Terkenang"	Ruslan Ayob	Azizi Adnan	January 25, 1997
41	7	"Pertandingan Layang-Layang"	Shafiee Mohamed	Lutfi Ismail	February 1, 1997
42	8	"Debab Kembali"	Mubarak Yahya	Lutfi Ismail	February 8, 1997
43	9	"Harta Karun"	Ariyon Ahmad; Zairul Akhmar	Azhar Ahmad	February 15, 1997
44	10	"Misi Mustahil"	Soul Hj. Ghazali	Soul Hj. Ghazali	February 22, 1997
45	11	"Berkhemah II"	Mubarak Yahya	Azizi Adnan	March 1, 1997
46	12	"Pantas Tangan"	Ruslan Ayob	Ruslan Ayob	March 8, 1997
47	13	"Perang Bukit"	Azhar Ahmad	Azhar Ahmad	March 15, 1997
48	14	"Jambatan Runtuh"	Ahmad Kamil Othman	Ahmad Kamil Othman	March 22, 1997
49	15	"Sisa Toksid"	Zairul Akhmar; Azwadi Abdullah; Khairul Hisham Salim; Shafiee Mohamed	Lutfi Ismail; Original story: Zahuri Harun	March 29, 1997
50	16	"Merdeka"	Ariyon Ahmad; Zairul Akhmar; Azwadi Abdullah	Azizi Adnan	April 5, 1997

== Broadcast ==
Usop Sontorian originally set to be aired in 1994, but it postponed for over 2 years due to uncertain reasons. The series was officially launched by the then-Minister of Information, Datuk Seri Mohamed Rahmat on 20 January 1996 at Putra World Trade Centre (PWTC) and debuted on RTM TV1 from January 27, 1996, and ended on April 5, 1997.

=== Reruns ===
In 2009, the series was aired on TV9 from May to December 2009, every Monday to Thursday at 8:30am. Previously, Usop Sontorian had reruns on TV1 from 1997 to 1998, and again from 2000 to 2002. The series later aired on TV2 from April 2005 to January 2006. Some of the series' episodes are also available on YouTube.

== Reception ==
In 1995, Usop Sontorian received recognition as the "Malaysia's First Animated Series" by The Malaysia Book of Records.

It also well received in Japan when it was screened at the Asian Animation Festival held in Hiroshima, Japan in June 1996. The series was distributed in Malaysia by Eurofine and for international release, it is distributed by Arief International under the titles Adventures Of Usop and Usop & Geng. It was also dubbed in English and Spanish.

== Cancelled feature film ==
In September 1996, Kharisma Pictures announced that a feature film based on the series, titled Usop Sontorian: The Movie was set to be released theatrically by the second quarter of 2000. The feature film would be computer-animated and will see the series' voice cast and crew returning, with series creator Ujang and director Kamn Ismail reprising their respective roles as writer and director for the film. The series' producer, Othman Yusof, executive producer Michael Lum and theme music composer, Zalikamari also will reprise their respective roles in the Usop Sontorian film.

The film was produced by Kharisma Pictures and distributed for Malaysian release by Eurofine and for international release by Arief International. However, the series creator Ujang announced that the planned Usop Sontorian film was cancelled following the shutdown of Kharisma Pictures and the series' demise in March 1997 as well as having difficulties to securing investment, just before the Asian financial crisis took place.

== Bibliography ==
- Hassan Abdullah Muthalib (June 2007). "From Mousedeer to Mouse: Malaysian Animation at the Crossroads". Inter-Asia Cultural Studies: Southeast Asian Cinema. 8 (2). Hong Kong: Dow Jones & Company: 288–297. doi:10.1080/14649370701238755. ISSN 1464-9373. S2CID 54991062. IDNumber: 512199.
- Faryna Mohd Khalis (2020). "The Evolution of Malaysian Cartoon Animation" (PDF). Voice of Academia (VoA). 16 (2). Kedah: Universiti Teknologi MARA: 1–25. ISSN 2682-7840.
