= Md Othman Yusof =

Malaysian politician

Yang Berbahagia Datuk Md Othman Yusof DMSM DSM KMN
- محمد عثمان يوسف

Member of the Johor State Legislative Assembly for Kukup
- In office 8 March 2008 – 5 May 2013
- Preceded by: Jamilah Endan
- Succeeded by: Suhaimi Salleh
- In office 28 June 2018 – 22 January 2022
- Preceded by: Suhaimi Salleh
- Succeeded by: Jefridin Atan

Personal details
- Born: Md Othman bin Yusof
- Citizenship: Malaysia
- Party: UMNO
- Other political affiliations: Barisan Nasional
- Occupation: Politician; Businessman; Television producer

Md Othman bin Yusof is a Malaysian politician, businessman and a former television producer who has served as Member of the Johor State Legislative Assembly (MLA) for Kukup from 2008 to 2013 and from 2018 to 2022. He is a member of the United Malays National Organisation (UMNO), a component party of the Barisan Nasional (BN) coalition.

== Early career ==
He was a producer of Malaysia's first animated TV series, Usop Sontorian, produced by Kharisma Pictures as well as the Director of MOY Publications Sdn Bhd, which publishes the comics, Ujang and Apo?. He was also the executive director of Country Garden Pacificview Sdn Bhd before being a state assemblyman.

== Political career ==
He was the Division Chief of Tanjung Piai UMNO until 2018, he was succeeded by Jefridin Atan.

== Election results ==
Johor State Legislative Assembly
Year	Constituency	Candidate	Votes	Pct	Opponent(s)	Votes	Pct	Ballots cast	Majority	Turnout
2008	N56 Kukup	Md Othman Yusof (UMNO)	10,897	80.10%	Ahmad Sani Kemat (PAS)	2,258	16.60%	13,605	8,639	76.91%
2018	N56 Kukup	Md Othman Yusof (UMNO)	11,113	48.61%	Suhaizan Kayat (AMANAH)	10,251	44.84%	22,863	862	84.93%
2018	N56 Kukup	Md Othman Yusof (UMNO)	11,113	48.61%	Karim Deraman (PAS)	1,040	4.55%	22,863	862	84.93%

== Awards and recognitions ==
- Malaysia
  - Officer of the Order of the Defender of the Realm (KMN) (2009)
- Malacca
  - Companion Class I of the Exalted Order of Malacca (DMSM) – Datuk (2002)
  - Member of the Exalted Order of Malacca (DSM)
