= Hasrunizah Hassan =

Malaysian politician

Yang Berhormat Hasrunizah Hassan MLA
- هاسرونيزاه حسن

Member of the Johor State Legislative Assembly for Pulai Sebatang
- Incumbent
- Assumed office 2022
- Preceded by: Muhammad Taqiuddin Cheman

Personal details
- Born: Hasrunizah binti Hassan; 1977 (age 48–49)
- Citizenship: Malaysian
- Party: UMNO
- Other political affiliations: Barisan Nasional
- Occupation: Politician

Hasrunizah binti Hassanis a Malaysian politician from UMNO.She has served as the Member of the Johor State Legislative Assembly for Pulai Sebatang since 2022. She is also a member of Executive Council of UMNO's Women Wing and the Women Chief of UMNO Pontian division.

== Election results ==
Johor State Legislative Assembly
Year	Constituency	Candidate	Votes	Pct.	Opponent(s)	Votes	Pct.	Ballots cast	Majority	Turnout
2022	N54 Pulai Sebatang	Hasrunizah Hassan (UMNO)	12,473	50.06%	Suhaizan Kayat (AMANAH)	6,148	24.67%	25,616	6,325	54.51%
2022	N54 Pulai Sebatang	Hasrunizah Hassan (UMNO)	12,473	50.06%	Abdullah Husin (PAS)	5,967	23.95%	25,616	6,325	54.51%
2022	N54 Pulai Sebatang	Hasrunizah Hassan (UMNO)	12,473	50.06%	Abd Rashid Abd Hadi (PEJUANG)	329	1.32%	25,616	6,325	54.51%
2026	N54 Pulai Sebatang	Hasrunizah Hassan (UMNO)	23,376	70.49%	Haniff Ghazali Hosman (PKR)	9,786	29.51%	33,522	13,590	40.58%
