= Suhaizan Kayat =

Malaysian politician

Yang Berhormat Tuan Suhaizan Kayat MP
- سحيزان كايت

Political Secretary to the Minister of Domestic Trade and Costs of Living
- In office 6 January 2023 – 12 December 2023
- Monarch: Abdullah
- Prime Minister: Anwar Ibrahim
- Minister: Salahuddin Ayub (January–July 2023); Armizan Mohd Ali (Acting, July–December 2023)
- Preceded by: Lidam Assan (Political Secretary to Minister of Domestic Trade and Consumer Affairs)
- Succeeded by: Mohammad Ghazali Hajiji

Speaker of the Johor State Legislative Assembly
- In office 28 June 2018 – 22 January 2022
- Monarch: Ibrahim Iskandar
- Menteri Besar: Osman Sapian (2018–2019); Sahruddin Jamal (2019–2020); Hasni Mohammad (2020–2022)
- Deputy: Gan Peck Cheng
- Preceded by: Mohamad Aziz
- Succeeded by: Mohd Puad Zarkashi
- Constituency: Non-MLA

Member of the Malaysian Parliament for Pulai
- Incumbent
- Assumed office 9 September 2023
- Preceded by: Salahuddin Ayub (PH–AMANAH)
- Majority: 18,641 (2023)

Personal details
- Born: Suhaizan bin Kayat; 13 April 1973 (age 53) Kampung Sungai Sudah, Muar, Johor, Malaysia
- Party: Malaysian Islamic Party (PAS) (until 2015); National Trust Party (AMANAH) (since 2015)
- Other political affiliations: Pakatan Rakyat (PR) (until 2015); Pakatan Harapan (PH) (since 2015)
- Spouse: Norsham Idris
- Education: University of Technology Malaysia
- Occupation: Politician

Suhaizan bin Kayat (born 13 April 1973) is a Malaysian politician who has served as the Member of Parliament (MP) for Pulai since September 2023. He served as Political Secretary to the Minister of Domestic Trade and Costs of Living Salahuddin Ayub and Armizan Mohd Ali from January to December 2023 and Speaker of the Johor State Legislative Assembly from June 2018 to January 2022. He is a member, State Vice Chairman of Johor and Division Chief of Pulai of the National Trust Party (AMANAH), a component party of the Pakatan Harapan (PH) coalition.

== Education ==
He received his early education at Sekolah Kebangsaan Parit Nawi, Muar and Sekolah Agama Seri Menanti, Muar (Special Degree). Then he continued his secondary schooling at Sekolah Menengah Seri Menanti, Muar and finally at Sekolah Agama Parit Nawi.

After graduating from secondary school, he continued his tertiary education and was awarded with a bachelor's degree and Masters of Computer Science from University of Technology Malaysia (UTM), Skudai.

He is active in the student association at UTM. Among the positions he holds, include as Exco and Vice President of the UTM Student Association.

== Community activities ==
He is also active in community activities. He has been appointed as the Development Secretary of Taman Universiti Skudai Mosque, Secretary of the Movement to Abolish PPSMI (GMP), Secretary of the People's Land Coalition (TANAH), Advisor of the Kempas People's Action Action Committee and Simpang Renggam People's Action Committee Advisor.

== Politics ==
He started venturing into politics by joining the Malaysian Islamic Party (PAS). Among his important positions in PAS, include as Johor PAS Youth Council Chief, Central PAS Youth Council Information Chief, Gelang Patah PAS Youth Council Chief, Pulai PAS Committee Member and Pos Malaysia Voting Committee Chairman.

He was appointed as the Speaker of the Johor State Legislative Assembly by then-Menteri Besar Osman Sapian from Pakatan Harapan (PH) on 28 June 2018 after Barisan Nasional (BN) state administration was removed in the 2018 state election and subsequently was retained as Speaker by Menteri Besar Hasni Mohammad from BN even though the PH state administration was overthrown by BN in February 2020. Hence, this became one of a few cases which the speaker is from the opposition instead of either being independent or from the government. He was the only speaker from the opposition in Malaysia. After BN returned to the state government following its victory in the 2022 Johor state election, he and Gan Peck Cheng were not reappointed as speaker and deputy speaker of the assembly.

== Election results ==
Parliament of Malaysia
Year	Constituency	Candidate	Votes	Pct	Opponent(s)	Votes	Pct	Ballots cast	Majority	Turnout
2004	P147 Parit Sulong	Suhaizan Kayat (PAS)	9,788	26.63%	Syed Hood Syed Edros (UMNO)	26,974	73.37%	38,116	17,186	76.03%
2013	P151 Simpang Renggam	Suhaizan Kayat (PAS)	14,048	41.56%	Liang Teck Meng (GERAKAN)	19,754	58.44%	34,670	5,706	87.62%
2023	P161 Pulai	Suhaizan Kayat (AMANAH)	48,283	61.54%	Zulkifli Jaafar (BERSATU)	29,642	37.78%	78,453	18,641	47.08%
2023	P161 Pulai	Suhaizan Kayat (AMANAH)	48,283	61.54%	Samsudin Mohamad Fauzi (IND)	528	0.67%	78,453	18,641	47.08%

Johor State Legislative Assembly
Year	Constituency	Candidate	Votes	Pct	Opponent(s)	Votes	Pct	Ballots cast	Majority	Turnout%
2008	N47 Kempas	Suhaizan Kayat (PAS)	7,711	32.66%	Osman Sapian (UMNO)	15,897	67.34%	24,102	8,186	73.13%
2013	N47 Kempas	Suhaizan Kayat (PAS)	14,648	44.06%	Tengku Putra Haron Aminurrashid (UMNO)	18,595	55.94%	33,737	3,947	86.10%
2018	N56 Kukup	Suhaizan Kayat (AMANAH)	10,251	45.76%	Md Othman Yusof (UMNO)	11,113	49.60%	22,863	862	84.90%
2018	N56 Kukup	Suhaizan Kayat (AMANAH)	10,251	45.76%	Karim Deraman (PAS)	1,040	4.64%	22,863	862	84.90%
2022	N54 Pulai Sebatang	Suhaizan Kayat (AMANAH)	6,148	24.67%	Hasrunizah Hassan (UMNO)	12,473	50.06%	25,616	6,325	54.51%
2022	N54 Pulai Sebatang	Suhaizan Kayat (AMANAH)	6,148	24.67%	Abdullah Husin (PAS)	5,967	23.95%	25,616	6,325	54.51%
2022	N54 Pulai Sebatang	Suhaizan Kayat (AMANAH)	6,148	24.67%	Abdul Rashid Abdul Hadi (PEJUANG)	329	1.32%	25,616	6,325	54.51%
2026	N44 Larkin	Suhaizan Kayat (AMANAH)	13,600	27.08%	Mohd Hairi Mad Shah (UMNO)	33,882	67.47%	50,749	20,282	66.20%
2026	N44 Larkin	Suhaizan Kayat (AMANAH)	13,600	27.08%	Norsinah Abu (BERSAMA)	2,737	5.45%	50,749	20,282	66.20%

== Honours ==
=== Honours of Malaysia ===
- Malaysia
  - Recipient of the 17th Yang di-Pertuan Agong Installation Medal (2025)
