= Johore Bahru Barat =

Federal constituency

Johor constituency

Defunct federal constituency
- Legislature: Dewan Rakyat
- Constituency created: 1958
- Constituency abolished: 1974
- First contested: 1959
- Last contested: 1969

Johore Bahru Barat was a federal constituency in Johor, Malaysia, that was represented in the Dewan Rakyat from 1959 to 1974.

The federal constituency was created in the 1974 redistribution and was mandated to return a single member to the Dewan Rakyat under the first past the post voting system.

== History ==
It was abolished in 1974 when it was redistributed.

=== Representation history ===
Members of Parliament for Johore Bahru Barat
Parliament	No	Years	Member	Party
Constituency split from Johore Bahru
Parliament of the Federation of Malaya
1st	P101	1959-1963	Ahmad Mohamed Shah (احمد محمد شه)	Alliance (UMNO)
Parliament of Malaysia
1st	P101	1963-1964	Ahmad Mohamed Shah (احمد محمد شه)	Alliance (UMNO)
2nd	P101	1964-1969	Rahmat Daud (رحمة داود)	Alliance (UMNO)
		1969-1971	Parliament was suspended	
3rd	P101	1971-1973	Mohamed Rahmat (محمد رحمة)	Alliance (UMNO)
3rd	P101	1973-1974	Mohamed Rahmat (محمد رحمة)	BN (UMNO)
Constituency abolished, split to Pulai and Renggam

=== State constituency ===
Parliamentary constituency	State constituency						
Parliamentary constituency	1954–59*	1959–1974	1974–1986	1986–1995	1995–2004	2004–2018	2018–present
Johore Bahru Barat		Gelang Patah					
Johore Bahru Barat		Tampoi					

=== Historical boundaries ===
State Constituency	Area
State Constituency	1959
Gelang Patah	Kangkar Pulai; Lima Kedai; Skudai; Tanjung Pelepas; Tebrau
Tampoi	Gertak Merah; Kampung Nong Chik; Kempas; Tampoi; Tasek Utara

== Election results ==
Malaysian general election, 1969: Johore Bahru Barat
Party	Candidate	Votes	%	∆%
Alliance	Mohamed Rahmat	12,319	65.28	▼3.82
DAP	Daing Ibrahim Othman	6,553	34.72	▲34.72
Total valid votes		18,872	100.00	
Total rejected ballots		917		
Unreturned ballots		0		
Turnout		19,789	93.51	▲15.60
Registered electors		21,162		
Majority		5,766	30.56	▼10.27
Alliance hold		Swing		

Malaysian general election, 1964: Johore Bahru Barat
Party	Candidate	Votes	%	∆%
Alliance	Rahmat Daud	11,722	69.10	▲7.30
Socialist Front	Lim Lee Koon	4,796	28.27	▼7.30
PAP	Liang Teck Sum	447	2.63	
Total valid votes		16,965	100.00	
Total rejected ballots		560		
Unreturned ballots		0		
Turnout		17,525	77.91	▲2.84
Registered electors		22,493		
Majority		6,926	40.83	▲17.23
Alliance hold		Swing		

Malayan general election, 1959: Johore Bahru Barat
Party	Candidate	Votes	%
Alliance	Ahmad Mohamed Shah	7,282	61.80
Socialist Front	Zahid Karim	4,501	38.20
Total valid votes		11,783	100.00
Total rejected ballots		152	
Unreturned ballots		0	
Turnout		11,935	75.07
Registered electors		15,899	
Majority		2,781	23.60
This was a new constituency created.
