= Pulai (federal constituency) =

Federal constituency in Johor, Malaysia

Pulai (P161)
Johor constituency

Federal constituency
- Legislature: Dewan Rakyat
- MP: Suhaizan Kayat; PH
- Constituency created: 1974
- First contested: 1974
- Last contested: 2023

Demographics
- Population (2020): 291,876
- Electors (2026): 174,236
- Area (km²): 73
- Pop. density (per km²): 3,998.3

Pulai is a federal constituency in Johor Bahru District, Johor, Malaysia, that has been represented in the Dewan Rakyat since 1974.

The federal constituency was created in the 1974 redistribution and is mandated to return a single member to the Dewan Rakyat under the first past the post voting system.

== Demographics ==
Ethnic breakdown of Pulai's electorate as of 2026
1. Malay (44.0%)
2. Chinese (40.3%)
3. Indian (12.5%)
4. Other ethnicities (3.20%)

As of 2020, Pulai has a population of 291,876 people.

Age breakdown of Pulai's electorate as of 2022
1. 18-20 (6.89%)
2. 21-29 (21.1%)
3. 30-39 (20.7%)
4. 40-49 (19.3%)
5. 50-59 (14.7%)
6. 60-69 (10.3%)
7. 70-79 (5.01%)
8. 80-89 (1.50%)
9. above 90 (0.49%)
Gender breakdown of Pulai's electorate as of 2022
1. Male (50.3%)
2. Female (49.7%)

== History ==
=== Polling districts ===
According to the gazette issued on 2 July 2026, the Pulai constituency has a total of 40 polling districts.

State constituency	Polling districts	Code	Location
Perling（N46）	Belibis Perling	161/46/01	SK Taman Perling
Perling（N46）	Sri Jaya	161/46/02	SK Kg Pasir
Perling（N46）	Kampong Pasir	161/46/03	SA Dato' Omar Yusof Kampung Pasir
Perling（N46）	Pengkalan Rinting	161/46/04	Dewan Hassan Abdullah
Perling（N46）	Skudai Kiri	161/46/05	SK Pengkalan Rinting
Perling（N46）	Sungai Danga	161/46/06	SK Sungai Danga
Perling（N46）	Taman Sutera	161/46/07	SK Taman Sutera
Perling（N46）	Bukit Serene	161/46/08	SJK (C) Foon Yew 2
Perling（N46）	Tarom	161/46/09	SMK Sultan Ismail
Perling（N46）	Nong Chik	161/46/10	Maktab Sultan Abu Bakar
Perling（N46）	Tambatan	161/46/11	SK Nong Chik
Perling（N46）	Gertak Merah	161/46/12	SA Bandar Johor Bahru
Perling（N46）	Kampong Bahru	161/46/13	SMK Aminuddin Baki
Perling（N46）	Yahya Awal	161/46/14	SMK (P) Sultan Ibrahim
Perling（N46）	Ngee Heng	161/46/15	SK Ngee Heng
Perling（N46）	Ayer Molek	161/46/16	SK Ayer Molek
Perling（N46）	Kampong Pahang	161/46/17	SK St. Joseph
Perling（N46）	Bandar	161/46/18	SK Infant Jesus Convent
Perling（N46）	Camar Perling	161/46/19	SA Taman Perling 2
Perling（N46）	Pekaka Perling	161/46/20	SA Ibnu Khaldun Taman Perling
Perling（N46）	Rawa Perling	161/46/21	SK Taman Peling 3; SMK Dato' Usman Awang
Perling（N46）	Bukit Indah	161/46/22	SMK Taman Bukit Indah; SJK (T) Ladang Bukit Serampang
Perling（N46）	Nusa Indah	161/46/23	SA Al-Itqan Taman Bukit Indah; SK Taman Bukit Indah; SJK (C) Poay Chai
Perling（N46）	Tampoi Indah	161/46/24	SK Taman Tampoi Indah
Perling（N46）	Simbang Perling	161/46/25	SMK Seri Perling
Perling（N46）	Uda Bestari	161/46/26	SMK Bandar Uda Utama
Kempas（N47）	Kempas	161/47/01	SMK Tan Sri Mohamed Rahmat
Kempas（N47）	Permatang	161/47/02	SA Kempas Baru
Kempas（N47）	Lembah Kempas	161/47/03	SK Kempas
Kempas（N47）	Jalan Tampoi	161/47/04	SK Taman Damansara Aliff
Kempas（N47）	Denai	161/47/05	SK Seri Kenanga
Kempas（N47）	Taman Siantan	161/47/06	SK Perumahan Tampoi 2
Kempas（N47）	Taman Johor	161/47/07	SMK Sri Rahmat; SA Taman Dahlia
Kempas（N47）	Taman Cempaka	161/47/08	SA Taman Cempaka; SK Taman Cempaka
Kempas（N47）	Taman Dahlia	161/47/09	SK Seri Melati
Kempas（N47）	Taman Kobena	161/47/10	SA Perumahan MARA
Kempas（N47）	Desa Rahmat	161/47/11	SMK Dato Abdul Rahman Yassin
Kempas（N47）	Pekan Tampoi	162/47/12	SJK (C) Tampoi
Kempas（N47）	Bukit Mewah	162/47/13	SK Taman Bukit Mewah; SA Taman Bukit Mewah
Kempas（N47）	Bukit Kempas	162/47/14	SK Taman Bukit Kempas; SA Taman Anggerik

=== Representation history ===
Members of Parliament for Pulai
Parliament	No	Years	Member	Party	Vote Share
Constituency created from Johore Bahru Barat and Pontian Selatan
4th	P113	1974–1978	Mohamed Rahmat (محمد رحمات)	BN (UMNO)	18,835; 75.79%
5th	P113	1978–1982	Mohamed Rahmat (محمد رحمات)	BN (UMNO)	29,717; 88.05%
6th	P113	1982–1986	Mohamed Rahmat (محمد رحمات)	BN (UMNO)	33,861; 77.02%
7th	P131	1986–1990	Mohamed Rahmat (محمد رحمات)	BN (UMNO)	21,743; 64.33%
8th	P131	1990–1995	Mohamed Rahmat (محمد رحمات)	BN (UMNO)	29,855; 62.93%
9th	P142	1995–1999	Mohamed Rahmat (محمد رحمات)	BN (UMNO)	36,871; 83.16%
10th	P142	1999–2004	Abdul Kadir Annuar (عبدالقادر أنوار)	BN (UMNO)	35,529; 76.42%
11th	P161	2004–2008	Nur Jazlan Mohamed (نور جذلان محمد)	BN (UMNO)	42,406; 85.01%
12th	P161	2008–2013	Nur Jazlan Mohamed (نور جذلان محمد)	BN (UMNO)	38,036; 68.38%
13th	P161	2013–2018	Nur Jazlan Mohamed (نور جذلان محمد)	BN (UMNO)	43,751; 51.91%
14th	P161	2018–2022	Salahuddin Ayub (صلاح الدين أيوب)	PH (AMANAH)	55,447; 63.81%
15th	P161	2022–2023	Salahuddin Ayub (صلاح الدين أيوب)	PH (AMANAH)	64,900; 55.33%
15th	P161	2023–present	Suhaizan Kayat (سحيزان كايت)	PH (AMANAH)	48,283; 61.55%

=== State constituency ===
Parliamentary constituency	State constituency						
Parliamentary constituency	1954–59*	1959–1974	1974–1986	1986–1995	1995–2004	2004–2018	2018–present
Pulai			Gelang Patah				
Pulai					Kempas		
Pulai							Perling
Pulai						Pengkalan Rinting	
Pulai			Skudai				
Pulai				Tambatan			

=== Historical boundaries ===
State Constituency	Area				
State Constituency	1974	1984	1994	2003	2018
Gelang Patah	Kayu Ara Pesong; Lima Kedai; Nusa Jaya; Pekan Nanas; Tanjung Pelepas	Kangkar Pulai; Lima Kedai; Mutiara Rini; Perling; Tanjung Pelepas			
Kempas			Bandar Baru Uda; Kempas; Taman Anggerik; Taman Desa Rahmat; Tampoi	Kempas; Taman Anggerik; Taman Desa Rahmat; Taman Sri Bahagia; Tampoi	
Perling					Bakar Batu; Bukit Indah; Kampung Pasir; Taman Tampoi Indah; Taman Ungku Aminah
Pengkalan Rinting				Bakar Batu; Bandar Uda Utama; Bukit Indah; Kampung Pasir; Taman Ungku Tun Aminah	
Skudai	Bakar Batu; Kempas; Perling; Tampoi; Tebrau				
Tambatan		Kempas; Taman Anggerik; Taman Desa Rahmat; Tampoi; Tasek Utara	Gertak Merah; Larkin; Nong Chik; Taman Ungku Tun Aminah; Tasek Utara		

=== Current state assembly members ===
No.	State Constituency	Member	Coalition (Party)
N46	Perling	Pannir Selvam Paliksina	BN (MIC)
N47	Kempas	Ramlee Bohani	BN (UMNO)

=== Local governments & postcodes ===
No.	State Constituency	Local Government	Postcode
N46	Perling	Johor Bahru City Council; Iskandar Puteri City Council (Bukit Indah and Perling areas)	80000, 80100, 80200, 80506, 80888, 81100, 81200 Johor Bahru
N47	Kempas	Johor Bahru City Council	80000, 80100, 80200, 80506, 80888, 81100, 81200 Johor Bahru

== Election results ==
Malaysian general by-election, 9 September 2023 Upon the death of incumbent, Salahuddin Ayub
Party	Candidate	Votes	%	∆%
PH	Suhaizan Kayat	48,283	61.55	▲6.22
PN	Zulkifli Jaafar	29,642	37.78	▲20.15
Independent	Samsudin Mohamad Fauzi	528	0.67	▲0.67
Total valid votes		78,453		
Total rejected ballots		363		
Unreturned ballots		66		
Turnout		78,882	47.33	▼23.63
Registered electors		166,653		
Majority		18,641	23.77	▼4.51
PH hold		Swing		
Source(s) https://lom.agc.gov.my/ilims/upload/portal/akta/outputp/1857937/PUB%20401%20(2023).pdf

Malaysian general election, 2022
Party	Candidate	Votes	%	∆%
PH	Salahuddin Ayub	64,900	55.33	▲55.33
BN	Nur Jazlan Mohamed	31,726	27.05	▼3.47
PN	Loh Kah Yong	20,677	17.63	▲17.63
Total valid votes		117,303	100.00	
Total rejected ballots		763		
Unreturned ballots		348		
Turnout		118,414	70.96	▼11.96
Registered electors		165,313		
Majority		33,174	28.28	▼5.01
PH hold		Swing		
Source(s) https://lom.agc.gov.my/ilims/upload/portal/akta/outputp/1753254/PUB%20617%20PARLIMEN%20JOHOR.pdf

Malaysian general election, 2018
Party	Candidate	Votes	%	∆%
PKR	Salahuddin Ayub	55,447	63.81	▲63.81
BN	Nur Jazlan Mohamed	26,523	30.52	▼11.90
PAS	Mohammad Mazri Yahya	4,332	4.99	▼43.10
Independent	Yap Keng Tak	591	0.68	▲0.68
Total valid votes		86,893	100.00	
Total rejected ballots		966		
Unreturned ballots		257		
Turnout		88,116	82.92	▼2.59
Registered electors		106,268		
Majority		28,924	33.29	▲28.47
PKR gain from BN		Swing		?
Source(s) "His Majesty's Government Gazette - Notice of Contested Election, Parliament for the State of Johore [P.U. (B) 244/2018]" (PDF). Attorney General's Chambers of Malaysia. 3 May 2018. Archived from the original (PDF) on 29 December 2019. "Federal Government Gazette - Results of Contested Election and Statements of the Poll after the Official Addition of Votes, Parliamentary Constituencies for the State of Johore [P.U. (B) 318/2018]" (PDF). Attorney General's Chambers of Malaysia. 28 May 2018.

Malaysian general election, 2013
Party	Candidate	Votes	%	∆%
BN	Nur Jazlan Mohamed	43,751	51.91	▼16.47
PAS	Salahuddin Ayub	40,525	48.09	▲16.47
Total valid votes		84,276	100.00	
Total rejected ballots		1,487		
Unreturned ballots		161		
Turnout		85,924	85.51	▲14.09
Registered electors		100,490		
Majority		3,226	3.82	▼32.94
BN hold		Swing		
Source(s) "Federal Government Gazette - Notice of Contested Election, Parliament for the State of Johore [P.U. (B) 181/2013]" (PDF). Attorney General's Chambers of Malaysia. 26 April 2013. "Federal Government Gazette - Results of Contested Election and Statements of the Poll after the Official Addition of Votes, Parliamentary Constituencies for the State of Johore [P.U. (B) 222/2013]" (PDF). Attorney General's Chambers of Malaysia. 22 May 2013.

Malaysian general election, 2008
Party	Candidate	Votes	%	∆%
BN	Nur Jazlan Mohamed	38,036	68.38	▼16.63
PAS	Abdullah Ideris	17,587	31.62	▲31.62
Total valid votes		55,623	100.00	
Total rejected ballots		1,079		
Unreturned ballots		161		
Turnout		56,863	71.42	▲1.87
Registered electors		79,622		
Majority		20,449	36.76	▼33.26
BN hold		Swing		

Malaysian general election, 2004
Party	Candidate	Votes	%	∆%
BN	Nur Jazlan Mohamed	42,406	85.01	▲8.59
PKR	Md Nasir Ab Wahab	7,480	14.99	▼8.59
Total valid votes		49,886	100.00	
Total rejected ballots		1,002		
Unreturned ballots		60		
Turnout		50,948	69.55	▲3.60
Registered electors		73,253		
Majority		34,926	70.02	▲17.18
BN hold		Swing		

Malaysian general election, 1999
Party	Candidate	Votes	%	∆%
BN	Abdul Kadir Annuar	35,529	76.42	▼6.74
PKR	Ismail Awab	10,961	23.58	▲23.58
Total valid votes		46,490	100.00	
Total rejected ballots		930		
Unreturned ballots		101		
Turnout		47,521	65.95	▼1.21
Registered electors		72,056		
Majority		24,568	52.84	▼13.48
BN hold		Swing		

Malaysian general election, 1995
Party	Candidate	Votes	%	∆%
BN	Mohamed Rahmat	36,871	83.16	▲20.23
S46	Omar Sharif	7,468	16.84	▲16.84
Total valid votes		44,339	100.00	
Total rejected ballots		1,378		
Unreturned ballots		229		
Turnout		45,946	67.16	▼8.92
Registered electors		68,412		
Majority		29,403	66.32	▲40.46
BN hold		Swing		

Malaysian general election, 1990
Party	Candidate	Votes	%	∆%
BN	Mohamed Rahmat	29,855	62.93	▼1.40
Parti Rakyat Malaysia	A. Razak Ahmad	17,583	37.07	▲1.40
Total valid votes		47,438	100.00	
Total rejected ballots		1,702		
Unreturned ballots		0		
Turnout		49,140	76.08	▲5.33
Registered electors		64,590		
Majority		12,272	25.86	▼2.80
BN hold		Swing		

Malaysian general election, 1986
Party	Candidate	Votes	%	∆%
BN	Mohamed Rahmat	21,743	64.33	▼12.69
Parti Rakyat Malaysia	Gurdial Singh Nijan Sadu Singh	12,056	35.67	▲35.67
Total valid votes		33,799	100.00	
Total rejected ballots		1,105		
Unreturned ballots		0		
Turnout		34,904	70.75	▼4.96
Registered electors		49,333		
Majority		9,687	28.66	▼25.38
BN hold		Swing		

Malaysian general election, 1982
Party	Candidate	Votes	%	∆%
BN	Mohamed Rahmat	33,861	77.02	▼11.03
DAP	Abdullah Abdul Hamid	10,105	22.98	▲22.98
Total valid votes		43,966	100.00	
Total rejected ballots		2,446		
Unreturned ballots		0		
Turnout		46,412	75.71	▼1.31
Registered electors		61,303		
Majority		23,756	54.04	▼22.06
BN hold		Swing		

Malaysian general election, 1978
Party	Candidate	Votes	%	∆%
BN	Mohamed Rahmat	29,717	88.05	▲12.26
PAS	Abdul Hamid Abdul Rahim	4,034	11.95	▲11.95
Total valid votes		33,751	100.00	
Total rejected ballots		1,551		
Unreturned ballots		0		
Turnout		35,302	77.02	▼4.71
Registered electors		45,834		
Majority		25,683	76.10	▲24.52
BN hold		Swing		

Malaysian general election, 1974
Party	Candidate	Votes	%
BN	Mohamed Rahmat	18,835	75.79
Parti Rakyat Malaysia	A. Razak Ahmad	6,015	24.21
Total valid votes		24,850	100.00
Total rejected ballots		1,496	
Unreturned ballots		0	
Turnout		26,346	81.73
Registered electors		32,236	
Majority		12,820	51.58
This was a new constituency created.
