= Md Jais Sarday =

Malaysian politician

Yang Berbahagia Datuk Md Jais Sarday PJN KMN
- محمد جائز سرداي

Johor State Executive Councillor (Youth and Sports : 16 March 2008–13 May 2013) (Education, Information, Entrepreneur Development and Co-operatives : 14 May 2013–12 March 2017) (Housing and Local Government : 12 March 2017–12 May 2018)
- In office 16 March 2008 – 12 May 2018
- Monarchs: Iskandar; Ibrahim
- Menteri Besar: Abdul Ghani Othman; Mohamed Khaled Nordin
- Preceded by: Aziz Kaprawi
- Succeeded by: Dzulkefly Ahmad (Housing); Tan Hong Pin (Local Government)
- Constituency: Mahkota

Member of the Johor State Legislative Assembly for Mahkota
- In office 8 March 2008 – 9 May 2018
- Preceded by: Gapar Gurrohu (UMNO–BN)
- Succeeded by: Muhamad Said Jonit (AMANAH–PH)
- Majority: 8,480 (2008); 1,108 (2013)

Personal details
- Born: Md Jais bin Sarday; 13 July 1967 (age 59) Johor, Malaysia
- Citizenship: Malaysian
- Party: United Malays National Organisation (UMNO)
- Other political affiliations: Barisan Nasional (BN)
- Education: University of Malaya; Universiti Teknologi Malaysia
- Occupation: Politician

Md Jais bin Sarday is a Malaysian politician. He was the Johor State Legislative Assembly member for the constituency of Mahkota in Johor from 2008 until 2018. He is a member and the Division Chief of Kluang of the United Malay National Organisation (UMNO), a major component party in the Barisan Nasional (BN) coalition.

== Election results ==
Johor State Legislative Assembly
Year	Constituency	Candidate	Votes	Pct	Opponent(s)	Votes	Pct	Ballots cast	Majority	Turnout
2008	N29 Mahkota	Md Jais Sarday (UMNO)	17,489	66.00%	Khairul Faizi Ahmad Kamil (PAS)	9,009	34.00%	27,536	8,480	77.40%
2013	N29 Mahkota	Md Jais Sarday (UMNO)	19,431	51.47%	Khairul Faizi Ahmad Kamil (PAS)	18,323	48.53%	38,396	1,108	86.80%
2018	N29 Mahkota	Md Jais Sarday (UMNO)	17,839	44.11%	Muhamad Said Jonit (AMANAH)	19,507	48.24%	41,185	1,668	84.80%
2018	N29 Mahkota	Md Jais Sarday (UMNO)	17,839	44.11%	Muhammad Hasbullah Md Najib (PAS)	3,092	7.65%	41,185	1,668	84.80%

== Honours ==
=== Honours of Malaysia ===
- Malaysia
  - Officer of the Order of the Defender of the Realm (KMN) (2015)
  - Commander of the Order of Meritorious Service (PJN) – Datuk (2016)
