= Mahkota (state constituency) =

Electoral district in Johor, Malaysia

Mahkota (N29)
Johor constituency

State constituency
- Legislature: Johor State Legislative Assembly
MLA
Syed Hussien Syed Abdullah
BN
- Constituency created: 2003
- First contested: 2004
- Last contested: 2026

Demographics
- Population (2020): 79,707
- Electors (2026): 67,562
- Area (km²): 60

Mahkota is a state constituency in Johor, Malaysia, that is represented in the Johor State Legislative Assembly.

The state constituency was first contested in 2004 and is mandated to return a single Assemblyman to the Johor State Legislative Assembly under the first-past-the-post voting system. It has been represented by Syed Hussien Syed Abdullah of Barisan Nasional (BN) since 2024.

== Demographics ==
As of 2020, Mahkota has a population of 104,148 people.

Ethnic breakdown of Mahkota's electorate as of 2022
1. Malay (55.7%)
2. Chinese (33.5%)
3. Indian (7.70%)
4. Other ethnicities (3.20%)

== History ==
=== Polling districts ===
According to the gazette issued on 2 July 2026, the Mahkota constituency has a total of 18 polling districts.

State constituency	Polling districts	Code	Location
Mahkota (N29)	Padang Tembak	152/29/01	SMK Sultan Abdul Jalil
Mahkota (N29)	Kampong Melayu Timor II	152/29/02	SA Sri Kg. Tengah 1; SA Sri Kg. Tengah 2
Mahkota (N29)	Kampung Tengah	152/29/03	SK Seri Kg Tengah
Mahkota (N29)	Kampong Melayu I	152/29/04	SK Kampong Melayu
Mahkota (N29)	Kampong Melayu II	152/29/05	Dewan Raya Majlis Perbandaran Kluang
Mahkota (N29)	Taman Lian Seng	152/29/06	SJK (T) Jalan Haji Manan
Mahkota (N29)	Haji Manan	152/29/07	SJK (C) Chong Eng
Mahkota (N29)	Mesjid Lama	152/29/08	SA Gunung Lambak
Mahkota (N29)	Bandar Tengah	152/29/09	SJK (C) Chong Eng
Mahkota (N29)	Taman Ilham	152/29/10	SA Kluang Barat
Mahkota (N29)	Dorset	152/29/11	SMK Taman Seri Kluang; Dewan Mahkota, Kem Mahkota; Dewan Pusat Banjir Kampong Bentong Kluang; Balai Raya Kampung Bentong
Mahkota (N29)	Taman Berlian	152/29/12	Dewan Serbaguna Taman Sri Kluang
Mahkota (N29)	Jalan Hospital	152/29/13	SK (L) Bandar Kluang
Mahkota (N29)	Taman Kerjasama	153/29/14	SMK Tun Hussein Onn
Mahkota (N29)	Kampung Baru	153/29/15	SMK Sultan Abdul Jalil
Mahkota (N29)	Taman Suria	152/29/16	SMK Seri Perdana
Mahkota (N29)	Indah Jaya	152/29/17	SK Dato' Syed Zain Alshahab
Mahkota (N29)	Sri Tengah	152/29/18	SMK Tengku Aris Bendahara

=== Representation history ===
Members of the Legislative Assembly for Mahkota
Assembly	No	Years	Member	Party
Constituency created from Paloh and Mengkibol
11th	N29	2004–2008	Gapar Gorrohu	BN (UMNO)
12th	N29	2008–2013	Md Jais Sarday	BN (UMNO)
13th	N29	2013–2018	Md Jais Sarday	BN (UMNO)
14th	N29	2018–2021	Muhamad Said Jonit	PH (AMANAH)
14th	N29	2021–2022	Muhamad Said Jonit	PH (PKR)
15th	N29	2022–2024	Sharifah Azizah Syed Zain	BN (UMNO)
15th	N29	2024–2026	Syed Hussien Syed Abdullah	BN (UMNO)
16th	N29	2026–present	Syed Hussien Syed Abdullah	BN (UMNO)

== Election results ==
Johor state election, 2026
Party	Candidate	Votes	%	∆%
BN	Syed Hussein Syed Abdullah	30,398	66.52	▼12.69
PH	Ahmad Zuhan Md Zain	13,753	30.10	▲30.10
BERSAMA	Abdul Hamid Ali	1,546	3.38	▲3.38
Total valid votes		45,697	100.00	
Total rejected ballots		388		
Unreturned ballots		58		
Turnout		46,143	68.30	▲14.46
Registered electors		67,562		
Majority		16,645	36.42	▼22.00
BN hold		Swing		

Johor state by-election, 28 September 2024 Upon the death of incumbent, Sharifah Azizah Syed Zain
Party	Candidate	Votes	%	∆%
BN	Syed Hussien Syed Abdullah	27,995	79.21	▲33.35
PN	Mohamad Haizan Jaafar	7,347	20.79	▼0.23
Total valid votes		35,342	98.97	
Total rejected ballots		339	0.96	
Unreturned ballots		24	0.07	
Turnout		35,705	53.84	▼3.50
Registered electors		66,318		
Majority		20,648	57.83	▲43.56
BN hold		Swing		

Johor state election, 2022
Party	Candidate	Votes	%	∆%
BN	Sharifah Azizah Syed Zain	16,611	45.86	▲1.75
PH	Muhammad Taqiuddin Cheman	11,445	31.59	▲31.59
PN	Mohamad Nor Lingan	7,614	21.02	▲21.02
Heritage	Mohamed Noor Suleiman	555	1.53	▲1.53
Total valid votes		36,225	97.08	
Total rejected ballots		805	2.16	
Unreturned ballots		286	0.77	
Turnout		37,316	57.34	▼27.49
Registered electors		65,074		
Majority		5,166	14.27	▲10.14
BN gain from PKR		Swing		?
Source(s) "RESULTS OF CONTESTED ELECTION AND STATEMENTS OF THE POLL AFTER THE OFFICIAL ADDITION OF VOTES" (PDF).

Johor state election, 2018
Party	Candidate	Votes	%	∆%
PKR	Muhamad Said Jonit	19,507	48.24	▲48.24
BN	Md Jais Sarday	17,839	44.11	▼7.36
PAS	Hasbullah Najib	3,092	7.65	▼40.88
Total valid votes		40,438	98.19	
Total rejected ballots		550	1.34	
Unreturned ballots		197	0.48	
Turnout		41,185	84.83	▼1.97
Registered electors		48,550		
Majority		1,668	4.13	▲1.19
PKR gain from BN		Swing		?
Source(s) "RESULTS OF CONTESTED ELECTION AND STATEMENTS OF THE POLL AFTER THE OFFICIAL ADDITION OF VOTES".

Johor state election, 2013
Party	Candidate	Votes	%	∆%
BN	Md Jais Sarday	19,431	51.47	▼14.53
PAS	Khairul Faizi Ahmad Kamil	18,323	48.53	▲14.53
Total valid votes		37,755	98.06	
Total rejected ballots		642	1.67	
Unreturned ballots		103	0.27	
Turnout		38,499	86.80	▲9.40
Registered electors		44,352		
Majority		1,108	2.94	▼29.06
BN hold		Swing		
Source(s) "KEPUTUSAN PILIHAN RAYA UMUM DEWAN UNDANGAN NEGERI". Archived from the original on 2022-10-10.

Johor state election, 2008
Party	Candidate	Votes	%	∆%
BN	Md Jais Sarday	17,489	66.00	▼16.26
PAS	Khairul Faizi Ahmad Kamil	9,009	34.00	▲16.26
Total valid votes		26,498	95.15	
Total rejected ballots		1,038	3.73	
Unreturned ballots		313	1.12	
Turnout		27,849	77.40	▲1.61
Registered electors		35,980		
Majority		8,480	32.00	▼32.52
BN hold		Swing		
Source(s) "KEPUTUSAN PILIHAN RAYA UMUM DEWAN UNDANGAN NEGERI PERAK BAGI TAHUN 2008".

Johor state election, 2004
Party	Candidate	Votes	%
BN	Gapar Gorrohu	19,045	82.26
PAS	Khairul Faizi Ahmad Kamil	4,107	17.74
Total valid votes		23,152	93.25
Total rejected ballots		1,089	4.39
Unreturned ballots		588	2.37
Turnout		24,829	75.79
Registered electors		32,761	
Majority		14,938	64.52
This was a new constituency created.
Source(s) "KEPUTUSAN PILIHAN RAYA UMUM DEWAN UNDANGAN NEGERI PERAK BAGI TAHUN 2004".
