= Tee Siew Kiong =

Malaysian politician

Yang Berbahagia Datuk Tee Siew Kiong DMSM PSI
- 郑修强

Johor State Executive Councillor for Tourism, Trade and Consumerism
- In office 14 May 2013 – 12 May 2018
- Monarch: Ibrahim Ismail
- Menteri Besar: Mohamed Khaled Nordin
- Preceded by: Hoo Seong Chang (Tourism, Domestic Trade and Consumerism); Tan Kok Hong (International Trade)
- Succeeded by: Liow Cai Tung (Tourism); Jimmy Puah Wee Tse (Trade); Ramakrishnan Suppiah (Consumerism)
- Constituency: Pulai Sebatang

Member of the Johor State Legislative Assembly for Pulai Sebatang
- In office 21 March 2004 – 9 May 2018
- Preceded by: Abd. Malik Ibrahim
- Succeeded by: Muhammad Taqiuddin Cheman
- Majority: 10,217 (2004); 5,765 (2008); 3,412 (2013)

Personal details
- Born: 1963 or 1964 (age 61–62) Johor, Malaysia
- Citizenship: Malaysian
- Party: MCA (until 2022)
- Other political affiliations: Barisan Nasional (until 2022)
- Occupation: Politician

Chinese name
- Traditional Chinese: 鄭修強
- Simplified Chinese: 郑修强
- Hanyu Pinyin: Zhèng Xiūqiáng
- Jyutping: Zeng6 Sau1 Koeng4
- Hokkien POJ: Tēⁿ Siu-kiông
- Tâi-lô: Tēnn Siu-kiông

Tee Siew Kiong is a Malaysian politician. He was the Member of Johor State Legislative Assembly for Pulai Sebatang from 2004 to 2018 and had served as Johor State Executive Councillor from 2013 to 2018.

== Politics ==
On 14 May 2013, he took the oath to become the first EXCO of MCA after the 2013 Malaysian general election after members of MCA had decided that they will not hold any post if their 2013 election result is worse than the 2008 election.

In the 2022 Johor state election, he criticised the MCA president, Wee Ka Siong for letting UMNO to contest for the Pulai Sebatang seat, which is a traditional MCA seat. On 17 May 2022, his MCA membership was suspended for 5 years due to his criticism, which is the harshest punishment in MCA. On 26 May 2022, he gave up his rights to appeal and quit the party.

== Election results ==
Johor State Legislative Assembly
Year	Constituency	Candidate	Votes	Pct	Opponent(s)	Votes	Pct	Ballots cast	Majority	Turnout
2004	N54 Pulai Sebatang	Tee Siew Kiong (MCA)	14,199	78.10%	Sarobo Ponoh (PAS)	3,982	21.90%	18,751	10,217	75.31%
2008	N54 Pulai Sebatang	Tee Siew Kiong (MCA)	11,878	66.02%	Shamsudin Jaafar (PAS)	6,113	33.98%	18,460	5,765	74.99%
2013	N54 Pulai Sebatang	Tee Siew Kiong (MCA)	13,554	57.20%	Ungku Mohd Noor Ungku Mahmood (PAS)	10,142	42.80%	24,161	3,412	85.90%
2018	N54 Pulai Sebatang	Tee Siew Kiong (MCA)	11,112	38.86%	Muhammad Taqiuddin Cheman (AMANAH)	14,507	50.74%	28,970	3,395	84.00%
2018	N54 Pulai Sebatang	Tee Siew Kiong (MCA)	11,112	38.86%	Baharom Mohamad (PAS)	2,975	10.40%	28,970	3,395	84.00%

== Honours ==
- Malacca
  - Companion Class I of the Order of Malacca (DMSM) – Datuk (2006)
- Johor
  - Second Class of the Sultan Ibrahim of Johor Medal (PSI II) (2015)
