= 2023 Pulai by-election =

2023 Pulai, Malaysia by election

← 2022	9 September 2023	Next →

P161 Pulai seat in the Dewan Rakyat
	PH	PN
Candidate	Suhaizan Kayat	Zulkifli Jaafar
Party	AMANAH	BERSATU
Alliance	PH	PN
Popular vote	48,293	29,642
Percentage	61.54%	37.78%
MP before election
Salahuddin Ayub (died)
Pakatan Harapan (AMANAH)
Elected MP
Suhaizan Kayat
Pakatan Harapan (AMANAH)

The 2023 Pulai by-election was a by-election held on 9 September 2023 for the Dewan Rakyat seat of Pulai. It was called following the death of incumbent, Salahuddin Ayub on 23 July 2023 of brain haemorrhage. The by-election was held on the same day as the Simpang Jeram by-election.

== Background ==
Pulai is a federal constituency in Johor. The state constituencies of Perling and Kempas are within Pulai. Pulai has a total of 165,313 electors, of which 44.5% are Malays, 40.2% Chinese, 12.2% Indians and 3.1% of other ethnicities.

Salahuddin was a 2-term Member of Parliament for Pulai since 2018 and Member of Johor State Assembly for Simpang Jeram since 2018. He was a member and Deputy Chairman (2015-2023) of the National Trust Party (AMANAH), a component party of the Pakatan Harapan (PH) coalition. He was the Minister of Agriculture and Agro-Based Industry from 2018 until the collapse of the Pakatan Harapan government in 2020. After the 2022 elections, he was appointed as Minister of Domestic Trade and Costs of Living until his death. By his death in 2023, he became the fourth federal minister to die in office after Tun Dr. Ismail (Deputy Prime Minister, Minister of Home Affairs and Minister of Trade and Industry in 1973), Tun Abdul Razak (Prime Minister and Minister of Defence in 1976) and Ali Ahmad (Minister of Agriculture and Rural Development in 1977). This also the first elections with incumbent death still hold both parliamentary and state constituencies since Fadzil Noor in 2002.

== Nomination and campaign ==
Nomination day were announced by Election Commission to be on 26 August 2023. On the nomination day, 3 candidates were accepted: Suhaizan Kayat from PH, Zulkifli Jaafar from Perikatan Nasional (PN), and Samsudin Fauzi as an independent.

Suhaizan were announced as PH candidate in a media conference by AMANAH President, Mohamad Sabu on 19 August. A former political secretary to the late Salahuddin, he also had served as Speaker for the Johor Legislative Assembly from 2018 to 2022 under 3 different Menteri Besar (Osman Sapian, Hasni Mohammad and Onn Hafiz Ghazi), including when PH is in opposition from 2020 to 2022. He also is the current AMANAH Johor deputy chairman. This is Suhaizan's seventh election as a candidate, having lost his previous six attempts. Suhaizan's campaign includes introducing more 'Rahmah Sales' affordable necessities locations, a project initiated by his mentor Salahuddin. His campaign also targets increasing job opportunities, and providing more recreational and sports facilities in the area if he wins the election.

Zulkifli, from Malaysian United Indigenous Party (BERSATU), were announced as PN's candidate by PN chairman Muhyiddin Yassin on 23 August. An entrepreneur based in Tampoi by trade who were listed in directorship at six different companies, he is the BERSATU deputy chief for Pulai branch. In his maiden campaign as candidate, Zulkifli is focused on helping to restore economic balance.

Samsudin announced his candidacy as independent on 22 August. He is the president of the Kuala Lumpur Consumer Safety Association (PKPKL), a non governmental organization (NGO) based in Kuala Lumpur, and aims to bring the voice of NGO to Parliament if elected. Samsudin has contested before in the Putrajaya federal seat at the last general election in 2022, losing his deposit. Samsudin claims most people see him as an outsider as he was based in Kuala Lumpur, even though he were born in the state, at Kluang. For his campaign, Samsudin has been assisted by a group of NGOs based in Johor Bahru, and introduced his manifesto to tackle poverty in the area.

Notably, this was the first federal election in Johor without candidates from Barisan Nasional (BN), traditionally the dominant party in the state and the current Johor government party. After formation of federal government consisting of the alliance between PH and BN in the aftermath of the general election in November 2022, both Pulai and Simpang Jeram by-election saw the first collaboration between BN and PH at Johor state level, as BN acceded to PH to put its candidate there, as well as campaigning together.

Think tank Nusantara Academy for Strategic Research data analyst Azlan Musyabri suggests that PN could win both seats, if the voter turnout trend is the same as the 2022 state election, but also suggested PH would retain both seats if BN voters support the PH candidate as well as increase of support from non-Malay voters from the 2022 election. Bridget Welsh, another political analyst based in Kuala Lumpur, predicted the result will hinge on either voters respect for Salahuddin legacy, or voters response to BN and UMNO president Zahid Hamidi discharge not amounting to an acquittal (DNAA) of his 47 court cases just days before the election. Other analysts, such as Dr Azmi Hassan also from Nusantara Academy, and Dr Ainul Adzellie Hasnul, believe that Zahid's DNAA, and also another UMNO leader Bung Mokhtar Radin acquittal of his own court case a day after, will not affect PH-BN negatively in the by-elections.

== Timeline ==
The key dates are listed below.

Date	Event
3 August 2023	Issue of the Writ of Election
26 August 2023	Nomination Day
26 August–8 September 2023	Campaigning Period
5–8 September 2023	Early Polling Day For Postal and Advance Voters
9 September 2023	Polling Day

== Results ==
Malaysian general by-election, 9 September 2023: Pulai Upon the death of incumbent, Salahuddin Ayub
Party	Candidate	Votes	%	∆%
PH	Suhaizan Kayat	48,283	61.55	+6.22
PN	Zulkifli Jaafar	29,642	37.78	+20.15
Independent	Samsudin Mohamad Fauzi	528	0.67	+0.67
Total valid votes		78,453		
Total rejected ballots		363		
Unreturned ballots		66		
Turnout		78,882	47.33	
Registered electors		166,653		
Majority		18,641		
PH hold		Swing		
Source(s) https://lom.agc.gov.my/ilims/upload/portal/akta/outputp/1857937/PUB%20401%20(2023).pdf

== Previous results ==
Malaysian general election, 2022: Pulai
Party	Candidate	Votes	%	∆%
PH	Salahuddin Ayub	64,900	55.33	-8.48
BN	Nur Jazlan Mohamed	31,726	27.05	-3.47
PN	Loh Kah Yong	20,677	17.63	+17.63
Total valid votes		117,303	100.00	
Total rejected ballots		763		
Unreturned ballots		348		
Turnout		118,414	70.96	
Registered electors		165,313		
Majority		33,174	28.28	
PH hold		Swing		
Source(s) https://lom.agc.gov.my/ilims/upload/portal/akta/outputp/1753254/PUB%20617%20PARLIMEN%20JOHOR.pdf

== Aftermath ==
Suhaizan, the winner of the by-election, were sworn in as the new MP for Pulai on 19 September before the resumption of the debate session of the 12th Malaysia Plan Mid-Term Review at the Parliament of Malaysia.
