= Pulai Sebatang =

Political subdivision in Malaysia

Pulai Sebatang (N54)
Johor constituency

State constituency
- Legislature: Johor State Legislative Assembly
MLA
Hasrunizah Hassan
BN
- Constituency created: 1984
- First contested: 1986
- Last contested: 2026

Demographics
- Population (2020): 52,745
- Electors (2026): 47,651
- Area (km²): 196

Pulai Sebatang is a state constituency in Johor, Malaysia, that is represented in the Johor State Legislative Assembly.

The state constituency was first contested in 1986 and is mandated to return a single Assemblyman to the Johor State Legislative Assembly under the first-past-the-post voting system.

== Demographics ==
As of 2020, Pulai Sebatang has a population of 52,745 people.

Ethnic breakdown of Pulai Sebatang's electorate as of 2026
1. Malay (62.6%)
2. Chinese (33.3%)
3. Other ethnicities (2.70%)
4. Indian (1.50%)

== History ==
=== Polling districts ===
According to the gazette issued on 2 July 2026, the Pulai Sebatang constituency has a total of 21 polling districts.

State constituency	Polling districts	Code	Location
Pulai Sebatang (N54)	Kampong Parit Kahar	164/54/01	SK Seri Sekawan Desa
Pulai Sebatang (N54)	Parit Keroma	164/54/02	SJK (C) Lee Ming
Pulai Sebatang (N54)	Ayer Baloi	164/54/03	SK Ayer Baloi
Pulai Sebatang (N54)	Bandar Ayer Baloi Selatan	164/54/04	SMK Ayer Baloi
Pulai Sebatang (N54)	Bandar Ayer Baloi Utara	164/54/05	SJK (C) Chi Chih
Pulai Sebatang (N54)	Parit Panjang	164/54/06	SK Jaya Mulia
Pulai Sebatang (N54)	Kampong Parit Haji Karim	164/54/07	SK Seri Pulai
Pulai Sebatang (N54)	Parit Sikom	164/54/08	SJK (C) Nan Mah
Pulai Sebatang (N54)	Kampong Jawa	164/54/09	SK Kampong Jawa
Pulai Sebatang (N54)	Pulai Sebatang	164/54/10	SK Pulai Sebatang
Pulai Sebatang (N54)	Api-Api	164/54/11	SK Api-Api
Pulai Sebatang (N54)	Sungai Trus	164/54/12	SK Kayu Ara Pasong
Pulai Sebatang (N54)	Pontian Besar Kiri	164/54/13	SMK Kayu Ara Pasong
Pulai Sebatang (N54)	Jalan Alsagoff	164/54/14	SJK (C) Tah Tong; SMK Sri Perhentian; SK Bandar Pontian; SK Tengku Mahmood Iskandar (1)
Pulai Sebatang (N54)	Pantai Bandar Pontian	164/54/15	SK Tengku Mahmood Iskansar (1)
Pulai Sebatang (N54)	Pegawai	164/54/16	SK Bandar Pontian
Pulai Sebatang (N54)	Jalan Taib	164/54/17	SJK (C) Pei Chun (1); SJK (C) Pei Chun (2)
Pulai Sebatang (N54)	Bakek	164/54/18	SK Tengku Mahmood Iskandar (2)
Pulai Sebatang (N54)	Parit Semerah	164/54/19	SA Parit Semerah
Pulai Sebatang (N54)	Parit Mesjid	164/54/20	SA Bandar Pontian
Pulai Sebatang (N54)	Parit Mesjid Darat	164/54/21	SMK Dato' Ali Haji Ahmad

=== Representation history ===
Members of the Legislative Assembly for Pulai Sebatang
Assembly	No	Years	Member	Party
Constituency created from Benut, Gelang Patah and Kukup
7th	N35	1986-1990	Khatijah Mat Som	BN (UMNO)
8th	N35	1990-1995	Nasir Safar	BN (UMNO)
9th	N39	1995-1999	Khatijah Mat Som	BN (UMNO)
10th	N39	1999-2004	Abdul Malik Ibrahim	BN (UMNO)
11th	N54	2004-2008	Tee Siew Kiong (鄭修強)	BN (MCA)
12th	N54	2008-2013	Tee Siew Kiong (鄭修強)	BN (MCA)
13th	N54	2013-2018	Tee Siew Kiong (鄭修強)	BN (MCA)
14th	N54	2018-2022	Muhammad Taqiuddin Cheman	PH (AMANAH)
15th	N54	2022–2026	Hasrunizah Hassan	BN (UMNO)
16th	N54	2026–present	Hasrunizah Hassan	BN (UMNO)

== Election results ==
Johor state election, 2026: Pulai Sebatang
Party	Candidate	Votes	%	∆%
BN	Hasrunizah Hassan	23,376	70.49	▲20.43
PH	Haniff Ghazali Hosman	9,786	29.51	▲4.84
Total valid votes		33,162	100.00	
Total rejected ballots		308		
Unreturned ballots		52		
Turnout		33,522	70.35	▲15.84
Registered electors		47,651		
Majority		13,590	40.98	▲15.60
BN hold		Swing		?

Johor state election, 2022: Pulai Sebatang
Party	Candidate	Votes	%	∆%
BN	Hasrunizah Hassan	12,473	50.06	▲11.20
PH	Suhaizan Kayat	6,148	24.67	▼14.19
PN	Abdullah Husin	5,967	23.95	▲23.95
PEJUANG	Abd Rashid Abd Hadi	329	1.32	▲1.32
Total valid votes		24,917	97.27	
Total rejected ballots		543	2.12	
Unreturned ballots		156	0.61	
Turnout		25,616	54.51	▼29.41
Registered electors		46,991		
Majority		6,325	25.39	▲13.52
BN gain from PKR		Swing		?

Johor state election, 2018: Pulai Sebatang
Party	Candidate	Votes	%	∆%
PKR	Muhammad Taqiuddin Cheman	14,507	50.73	▲50.73
BN	Tee Siew Kiong	11,112	38.86	▼18.34
PAS	Baharom Mohamad	2,975	10.40	▲32.40
Total valid votes		28,594	98.26	
Total rejected ballots		376	1.29	
Unreturned ballots		130	0.45	
Turnout		29,100	83.92	▼1.98
Registered electors		34,676		
Majority		3,395	11.87	▼2.53
PKR gain from BN		Swing		?
Source(s) "RESULTS OF CONTESTED ELECTION AND STATEMENTS OF THE POLL AFTER THE OFFICIAL ADDITION OF VOTES".

Johor state election, 2013: Pulai Sebatang
Party	Candidate	Votes	%	∆%
BN	Tee Siew Kiong	13,554	57.20	▼8.82
PAS	Ungku Mohd Noor Ungku Mahmood	10,142	42.80	▲8.82
Total valid votes		23,696	97.89	
Total rejected ballots		465	1.92	
Unreturned ballots		46	0.19	
Turnout		24,207	85.90	▲10.91
Registered electors		28,170		
Majority		3,412	14.40	▼17.64
BN hold		Swing		
Source(s) "KEPUTUSAN PILIHAN RAYA UMUM DEWAN UNDANGAN NEGERI".

Johor state election, 2008: Pulai Sebatang
Party	Candidate	Votes	%	∆%
BN	Tee Siew Kiong	11,878	66.02	▼12.08
PAS	Shamsudin Jaafar	6,113	33.98	▲12.08
Total valid votes		17,991	97.46	
Total rejected ballots		469	2.54	
Unreturned ballots		0	0.00	
Turnout		18,460	74.99	▼0.32
Registered electors		24,618		
Majority		5,765	32.04	▼24.16
BN hold		Swing		
Source(s) "KEPUTUSAN PILIHAN RAYA UMUM DEWAN UNDANGAN NEGERI PERAK BAGI TAHUN 2008".

Johor state election, 2004: Pulai Sebatang
Party	Candidate	Votes	%	∆%
BN	Tee Siew Kiong	14,199	78.10	▼1.39
PAS	Sarobo Ponoh	3,982	21.90	▲1.39
Total valid votes		18,181	96.96	
Total rejected ballots		467	2.49	
Unreturned ballots		103	0.55	
Turnout		18,751	75.31	▲0.35
Registered electors		24,899		
Majority		10,217	56.20	▼2.78
BN hold		Swing		
Source(s) "KEPUTUSAN PILIHAN RAYA UMUM DEWAN UNDANGAN NEGERI PERAK BAGI TAHUN 2004".

Johor state election, 1999: Pulai Sebatang
Party	Candidate	Votes	%	∆%
BN	Abdul Malik Ibrahim	20,450	79.49	▲16.25
PAS	Sarobo Ponoh	5,278	20.51	▲20.51
Total valid votes		25,728	96.59	
Total rejected ballots		875	3.28	
Unreturned ballots		34	0.13	
Turnout		26,637	74.96	▲1.37
Registered electors		35,534		
Majority		15,172	58.98	▲25.23
BN hold		Swing		
Source(s) "KEPUTUSAN PILIHAN RAYA UMUM DEWAN UNDANGAN NEGERI PERAK BAGI TAHUN 1999".

Johor state election, 1995: Pulai Sebatang
Party	Candidate	Votes	%	∆%
BN	Khatijah Mat Som	14,849	63.24	▲7.70
Independent	Mohd. Sanusi Abdul Latif	6,924	29.49	▲29.49
S46	Mohd. Yusof Adam	1,708	7.27	▼37.19
Total valid votes		23,481	94.98	
Total rejected ballots		1,083	4.38	
Unreturned ballots		157	0.64	
Turnout		24,721	73.59	▼1.02
Registered electors		33,594		
Majority		7,925	33.75	▲22.67
BN hold		Swing		
Source(s) "KEPUTUSAN PILIHAN RAYA UMUM DEWAN UNDANGAN NEGERI PERAK BAGI TAHUN 1995".

Johor state election, 1990: Pulai Sebatang
Party	Candidate	Votes	%	∆%
BN	Nasir Safar	12,033	55.54	▼6.07
S46	Nasir	9,633	44.46	▲44.46
Total valid votes		21,666	94.58	
Total rejected ballots		1,241	5.42	
Unreturned ballots		0	0.00	
Turnout		22,907	74.61	▲0.80
Registered electors		30,704		
Majority		2,400	11.08	▼12.14
BN hold		Swing		
Source(s) "KEPUTUSAN PILIHAN RAYA UMUM DEWAN UNDANGAN NEGERI PERAK BAGI TAHUN 1990".

Johor state election, 1986: Pulai Sebatang
Party	Candidate	Votes	%
BN	Khatijah Mat Som	12,488	61.61
DAP	Chen Jun Kong	7,781	38.39
Total valid votes		20,269	96.03
Total rejected ballots		837	3.97
Unreturned ballots		0	0.00
Turnout		21,106	73.81
Registered electors		28,595	
Majority		4,707	23.22
This was a new constituency created.
Source(s) "KEPUTUSAN PILIHAN RAYA UMUM DEWAN UNDANGAN NEGERI PERAK BAGI TAHUN 1986".
