= Sharifah Azizah Syed Zain =

Malaysian politician (1960–2024)

Yang Berbahagia Dato' Hajah Sharifah Azizah Syed Zain DIMP KMN AMN
- شريفة عزيزة سيد زين

Member of the Johor State Legislative Assembly for Mahkota
- In office 12 March 2022 – 2 August 2024
- Preceded by: Muhamad Said Jonit (PH–AMANAH)
- Succeeded by: Syed Hussien Syed Abdullah (BN–UMNO)
- Majority: 5,166 (2022)

Member of the Johor State Legislative Assembly for Penawar
- In office 9 May 2018 – 12 March 2022
- Preceded by: Hamimah Mansor (BN–UMNO)
- Succeeded by: Fauziah Misri (BN–UMNO)
- Majority: 7,134 (2018)

Senator Appointed by the Yang di-Pertuan Agong
- In office 9 March 2007 – 8 March 2010
- Monarch: Mizan Zainal Abidin
- Prime Minister: Abdullah Ahmad Badawi (2007–2009); Najib Razak (2009–2010)

Faction represented in the Johor State Legislative Assembly
- 2018–2024: Barisan Nasional

Faction represented in Dewan Negara
- 2007–2010: Barisan Nasional

Personal details
- Born: Sharifah Azizah binti Syed Zain; 8 December 1960 Kluang, Johor, Federation of Malaya (now Malaysia)
- Died: 2 August 2024 (aged 63) Kluang, Johor, Malaysia
- Resting place: Raudhatul Sakinah Cemetery, Kampung Tengah, Kluang, Johor
- Citizenship: Malaysia
- Party: United Malays National Organisation (UMNO)
- Other political affiliations: Barisan Nasional (BN)
- Children: 4
- Parent: Syed Zain Syed Idrus Shahab Al-Haj (father)
- Occupation: Politician

Sharifah Azizah binti Syed Zain (8 December 1960 – 2 August 2024) was a Malaysian politician who had served as Member of the Johor State Legislative Assembly (MLA) for Penawar from May 2018 to March 2022 and for Mahkota from March 2022 to her death in August 2024. She was the Women Division Chief of Kluang of the United Malays National Organisation (UMNO), a component party of the Barisan Nasional (BN) coalition. Sharifah Azizah died from internal bleeding in Kluang, Johor, on 2 August 2024, at the age of 63. A by-election was held on 28 September 2024, Syed Hussien Syed Abdullah of BN was elected as the new Mahkota MLA.

== Election results ==
Johor State Legislative Assembly
Year	Constituency	Candidate	Votes	Pct	Opponent(s)	Votes	Pct	Ballots cast	Majority	Turnout
2018	N38 Penawar	Sharifah Azizah Syed Zain (UMNO)	12,330	68.04%	Ahmad Kamah Nor (AMANAH)	5,196	28.67%	18,121	7,134	84.32%
2022	N29 Mahkota	Sharifah Azizah Syed Zain (UMNO)	16,611	45.86%	Muhammad Taqiuddin Cheman (AMANAH)	11,445	31.59%	36,225	5,166	55.67%
2022	N29 Mahkota	Sharifah Azizah Syed Zain (UMNO)	16,611	45.86%	Mohamad Nor Lingan (BERSATU)	7,614	21.02%	36,225	5,166	55.67%
2022	N29 Mahkota	Sharifah Azizah Syed Zain (UMNO)	16,611	45.86%	Mohamed Noor Suleiman (WARISAN)	555	1.53%	36,225	5,166	55.67%

== Honours ==
=== Honours of Malaysia ===
- Malaysia
  - Officer of the Order of the Defender of the Realm (KMN) (2004)
  - Member of the Order of the Defender of the Realm (AMN) (2001)
- Pahang
  - Knight Companion of the Order of the Crown of Pahang (DIMP) – Dato' (2010)
