= Fauziah Misri =

Malaysian politician

Yang Berhormat Fauziah Misri MLA
- فاوزياه ميسري

Member of the Johor State Legislative Assembly for Penawar
- Incumbent
- Assumed office 2022
- Preceded by: Sharifah Azizah Syed Zain

Personal details
- Born: Fauziah binti Misri
- Citizenship: Malaysian
- Party: United Malays National Organisation (UMNO)
- Other political affiliations: Barisan Nasional (BN)
- Occupation: Politician

Fauziah binti Misri is a Malaysian politician from United Malays National Organisation (UMNO). She has served as the Member of the Johor State Legislative Assembly for Penawar since 2022.

== Election results ==
Johor State Legislative Assembly election results
Year	Constituency	Candidate	Votes	Pct.	Opponent(s)	Votes	Pct.	Ballots cast	Majority	Turnout
2022	N38 Penawar	Fauziah Misri (BN)	12,409	66.98%	Mohd Faizal Asmar (PN)	4,904	26.47%	18,897	7,505	63.13%
2022	N38 Penawar	Fauziah Misri (BN)	12,409	66.98%	Norazila Sanip (PH)	693	3.74%	18,897	7,505	63.13%
2022	N38 Penawar	Fauziah Misri (BN)	12,409	66.98%	Rahmattullah Kamilin (PEJUANG)	521	2.81%	18,897	7,505	63.13%
