= Jefridin Atan =

Malaysian politician (born 1968)

Yang Berbahagia Dato' Jefridin Atan DIMP
- جفرالدين أتن

Member of the Johor State Legislative Assembly for Kukup
- In office 12 March 2022 – 11 July 2026
- Preceded by: Md Othman Yusof (BN–UMNO)
- Majority: 8,201 (2022)

Senator

Elected by the Johor State Legislative Assembly
- In office 13 September 2020 – 12 September 2023 Serving with Lim Pay Hen
- Monarch: Abdullah
- Prime Minister: Muhyiddin Yassin (2020–2021); Ismail Sabri Yaakob (2021–2022); Anwar Ibrahim (2022–2023)
- Preceded by: Zahari Sarip
- Succeeded by: Abdul Halim Suleiman

Personal details
- Born: 19 January 1968 (age 58) Pontian Kecil, Johor, Malaysia
- Citizenship: Malaysia
- Party: United Malays National Organisation (UMNO)
- Other political affiliations: Barisan Nasional (BN)
- Occupation: Politician

Jefridin bin Atan (born 19 January 1968) is a Malaysian politician who has served as Member of the Johor State Legislative Assembly (MLA) for Kukup since March 2022. He served as a Senator representing Johor from September 2020 to September 2023. He is a member and formerly the Division Chief of Tanjung Piai of the United Malays National Organisation (UMNO), a component party of the Barisan Nasional (BN) coalition.

== Politics ==
He previously served as the private secretary to former Prime Minister, Abdullah Ahmad Badawi in 2001.

During the 2019 Tanjung Piai by-election that was triggered following the death of Mohamed Farid Md Rafik, Jefridin was widely considered as the potential candidate of the BN coalition. This was despite the stronghold of the former MP Wee Jeck Seng from the Malaysian Chinese Association (MCA), another component of the BN, the majority voters of the constituency are Malays. However, BN ultimately chose Wee Jeck Seng, who later defeated the then ruling Pakatan Harapan (PH) candidate, Karmaine Sardini from Malaysian United Indigenous Party (BERSATU).

On 13 September 2020, Jefridin was appointed as a Senator by the Johor State Legislative Assembly, after recommended by the Menteri Besar, Hasni Mohammad. He was officially inaugurated 2 days later.

On 12 March 2022, he won the Kukup seat of the Johor State Legislative Assembly.

== Election results ==
Johor State Legislative Assembly
Year	Constituency	Candidate	Votes	Pct	Opponent(s)	Votes	Pct	Ballot cast	Majority	Turnout
2022	N56 Kukup	Jefridin Atan (UMNO)	11,640	60.37%	Mahathir Muhammad (BERSATU)	3,439	17.84%	19,282	8,201	55.69%
2022	N56 Kukup	Jefridin Atan (UMNO)	11,640	60.37%	Mohd Zaiful Bakri (PKR)	3,276	16.99%	19,282	8,201	55.69%
2022	N56 Kukup	Jefridin Atan (UMNO)	11,640	60.37%	Zamzam Hashim (PEJUANG)	927	4.81%	19,282	8,201	55.69%

== Honours ==
- Pahang
  - Knight Companion of the Order of the Crown of Pahang (DIMP) – Dato' (2006)
