= Syed Hussien Syed Abdullah =

Malaysian politician

Yang Berhormat Tuan Syed Hussien Syed Abdullah MLA
- سيد حسين سيد عبدالله

Member of the Johor State Legislative Assembly for Mahkota
- Incumbent
- Assumed office 28 September 2024
- Preceded by: Sharifah Azizah Syed Zain (BN–UMNO)
- Majority: 20,648 (2024)

Personal details
- Born: Syed Hussien bin Syed Abdullah; 17 April 1984 (age 42) Kluang, Johor, Malaysia
- Party: United Malays National Organisation (UMNO)
- Other political affiliations: Barisan Nasional (BN)
- Education: University of Technology Malaysia (Dip)
- Occupation: Politician

Syed Hussien bin Syed Abdullah (Jawi: سيد حسين بن سيد عبدالل; born 17 April 1984) is a Malaysian politician who has served as Member of the Johor State Legislative Assembly (MLA) for Mahkota since September 2024. He is a member of the United Malays National Organisation (UMNO), a component party of the Barisan Nasional (BN) coalition.

== Early life and education ==
Syed Hussien bin Syed Abdullah was born in Kluang, Johor, Malaysia in 1984. He received his early education in Chong Eng Chinese Primary School (1991–1996), Jalan Mengkibol, Kluang Secondary School (1997–1999) and Segamat Vocational High School (2000–2001). He continued his studies in University of Technology Malaysia (UTM), where he received his Professional Diploma in Business and Administration in 2021.

== Early career ==
Syed Hussien serves as the director of Syarikat Perniagaan Kembar Kubah from 2008.

== Political career ==
Syed Hussien served as the youth chief of UMNO Youth in Kampung Palembang Lama from 2013 until 2022. He also served as the committee member of UMNO Youth for Kluang and information chief of UMNO Youth for Kluang, both from 2018 until 2022. He also served as the vice chief of Information Section of UMNO Youth for Johor (2018–2022). He serves as the youth chief of UMNO Youth for Kluang and information chief of UMNO Youth for Johor, both since 2023.

Syed Hussien serves as the member of the Kluang District Council (Sri Impian zone) from 2024. He was sworn in as the Mahkota MLA five days after his election on 3 October 2024.

== Personal life ==
Apart from his native Malay, Syed Hussain can speak English and Mandarin. Syed Hussain also has the Chinese name 赛福星 (pinyin: Sài Fúxīng, Hokkien Pe̍h-ōe-jī: Sài Hok-seng), meaning "Star of Fortune", which is used within the local Chinese community.

== Election results ==
Johor State Legislative Assembly
Year	Constituency	Candidate	Votes	Pct	Opponent(s)	Votes	Pct	Ballots cast	Majority	Turnout
2024	N29 Mahkota	Syed Hussien Syed Abdullah (UMNO)	27,995	79.21%	Mohamad Haizan Jaafar (BERSATU)	7,347	20.79%	35,705	20,648	53.84%
2026	N29 Mahkota	Syed Hussien Syed Abdullah (UMNO)		%	Abdul Hamid Ali (BERSAMA)		%			%
2026	N29 Mahkota	Syed Hussien Syed Abdullah (UMNO)		%	Ahmad Zuhan Md Zain (AMANAH)		%			%
