= Muhamad Said Jonit =

Malaysian politician (died 2024)

- محمد سعيد جنيد

Member of the Johor State Legislative Assembly for Mahkota
- In office 2018–2022
- Preceded by: Md Jais Sarday
- Succeeded by: Sharifah Azizah Syed Zain

Personal details
- Born: Muhamad Said bin Jonit; 1953
- Died: 12 December 2024 (71–72 years old) Kluang, Malaysia
- Citizenship: Malaysian
- Party: PAS (till 2015); AMANAH (2015–2021); PKR (2021–2024)
- Other political affiliations: Pakatan Rakyat (till 2015); Pakatan Harapan (2015–2024)
- Occupation: Politician

Muhamad Said bin Jonit (1953 – 12 December 2024) was a Malaysian politician. He was the Member of Johor State Legislative Assembly for Mahkota after winning it in the 2018 Johor state election.

== Life and career ==
Jonit was a member of PAS before joining AMANAH and had participated in the 2013 Malaysian general election. He was the Chief of AMANAH Simpang Renggam branch. On 27 February 2021, Senggarang state assemblyman, Khairuddin had announced that he had left AMANAH and joined PKR, together with Muhamad Said and Serom state assemblyman, Faizul Amri. Jonit died on 12 December 2024.

== Election results ==
Parliament of Malaysia
Year	Constituency	Candidate	Votes	Pct	Opponent(s)	Votes	Pct	Ballots cast	Majority	Turnout
2013	P155 Tenggara	Muhamad Said Jonit (PAS)	8,502	24.33%	Halimah Mohamed Sadique (UMNO)	25,698	73.54%	34,946	17,196	88.04%

Johor State Legislative Assembly
Year	Constituency	Candidate	Votes	Pct	Opponent(s)	Votes	Pct	Ballots cast	Majority	Turnout
2018	N29 Mahkota	Muhamad Said Jonit (AMANAH)	19,507	48.24%	Md Jais Sarday (UMNO)	17,839	43.31%	41,185	1,668	84.83%
2018	N29 Mahkota	Muhamad Said Jonit (AMANAH)	19,507	48.24%	Hasbullah Najib (PAS)	3,092	7.51%	41,185	1,668	84.83%
