= Muhammad Taqiuddin Cheman =

Malaysian politician

- محمد تقي الدين چئ من

Deputy Youth Chief of the National Trust Party
- In office 4 July 2020 – 17 December 2023
- President: Mohamad Sabu
- Youth Chief: Shazni Munir Mohd Ithnin (2020–2021); Mohd Hasbie Muda (2021–2023)
- Preceded by: Shazni Munir Mohd Ithnin
- Succeeded by: Danial Al Rashid Haron Aminar Rashid

Member of the Johor State Legislative Assembly for Pulai Sebatang
- In office 9 May 2018 – 12 March 2022
- Preceded by: Tee Siew Kiong (BN–MCA)
- Succeeded by: Hasrunizah Hassan (BN–UMNO)
- Majority: 3,395 (2018)

Personal details
- Born: Muhammad Taqiuddin bin Cheman; 28 August 1988 (age 37) Pontian, Johor
- Citizenship: Malaysian
- Party: National Trust Party (AMANAH)
- Other party: Pakatan Harapan (PH)
- Spouse: Nur Aisyah Abd Rahman
- Parent: Cheman Yusoh (father)
- Occupation: Politician

Muhammad Taqiuddin bin Cheman is a Malaysian politician who served as Member of the Johor State Legislative Assembly (MLA) for Pulai Sebatang from May 2018 to March 2022. He is a member of the National Trust Party (AMANAH), a component party of the Pakatan Harapan (PH) coalition. He also served as the Deputy Youth Chief of AMANAH from July 2020 to December 2023 and the Director of Youth Election Bureau and State Youth Chief of AMANAH and PH of Johor. He is the son of Cheman Yusoh of Perikatan Nasional (PN), who contested in the 2018 Johor state election for the Sungai Balang state seat.

== Education ==
He has a Diploma in Management and is a Bachelor of Business Administration from Kolej Pengajian Islam Johor (MARSAH).

== Politics ==
In the 2022 Johor state election, he was renominated by PH to contest for the Mahkota state seat. He lost to Sharifah Azizah Syed Zain of Barisan Nasional (BN) by a minority of 5,166 votes.

== Election results ==
Johor State Legislative Assembly
Year	Constituency	Candidate	Votes	Pct.	Opponent(s)	Votes	Pct.	Ballots cast	Majority	Turnout
2018	N54 Pulai Sebatang	Muhammad Taqiuddin Cheman (AMANAH)	14,507	49.85%	Tee Siew Kiong (MCA)	11,112	38.19%	29,100	3,395	83.92%
2018	N54 Pulai Sebatang	Muhammad Taqiuddin Cheman (AMANAH)	14,507	49.85%	Baharom Mohamad (PAS)	2,975	10.22%	29,100	3,395	83.92%
2022	N29 Mahkota	Muhammad Taqiuddin Cheman (AMANAH)	11,445	30.67%	Sharifah Azizah Syed Zain (UMNO)	16,611	44.51%	37,316	5,166	57.34%
2022	N29 Mahkota	Muhammad Taqiuddin Cheman (AMANAH)	11,445	30.67%	Mohamad Nor Lingan (BERSATU)	7,614	20.40%	37,316	5,166	57.34%
2022	N29 Mahkota	Muhammad Taqiuddin Cheman (AMANAH)	11,445	30.67%	Mohamed Noor Suleiman (WARISAN)	555	1.49%	37,316	5,166	57.34%
2026	N15 Maharani	Muhammad Taqiuddin Cheman (AMANAH)			Muhammad Amir Fiqri (MUDA)					
2026	N15 Maharani	Muhammad Taqiuddin Cheman (AMANAH)			Ashari Md Sarip (UMNO)					
2026	N15 Maharani	Muhammad Taqiuddin Cheman (AMANAH)			Mohamad Anuar Hayan (PAS)					
