= Ahmad Abdullah =

Malaysian politician and accountant

Dato' Ahmad bin Abdullah (28 February 1941 – 28 September 2005), usually known as Dato' Ahmad, was a Malaysian politician and accountant.

== Career ==
In 1976, Dato' Ahmad (a Chartered Accountant with the Malaysian Institute of Accountants and a Certified Public Accountant with the Malaysian Institute of Certified Public Accountants) co-founded chartered accountancy firm Ahmad Abdullah & Goh with chartered accountant Michael Goh, and remained a partner of the firm until 1982. The firm has since become a leading local firm delivering a full range of chartered accountancy services. Michael Goh now serves as the managing partner of the firm.

In 1982, Dato' Ahmad was elected a Johor State Assemblyman for Kukup. He was subsequently re-elected for 3 further consecutive terms until 1999. From 1986 to 1995 he also served on the Johor State Executive Council and as Acting Chief Minister (Menteri Besar) on 4 occasions.

In 1999, Dato' Ahmad (also a Certified Financial Planner with the Financial Planning Association of Malaysia and a Registered Financial Consultant with the International Association of Registered Financial Consultants) retired from politics and set up consulting house Ahmad Abdullah & Goh Consulting and served as its chairman.

Dato' Ahmad also sat on the boards of Johor Corporation (formerly Johor State Economic Development Corporation) and Johor Islamic Corporation (formerly Johor State Islamic Economic Development Corporation), and served as the Vice-President of the Johor State Malay Chamber of Commerce (Dewan Perniagaan Melayu Malaysia Negeri Johor) until his death in 2005.
