= Mohamed Rahmat =

Malaysian politician

Yang Berbahagia Tan Sri Mohamed Rahmat PSM SPMJ SIMP SPDK SSSA SPMT SSIJ DGSM PNBS DPMJ DPMS KMN PIS BSI

Ministerial roles
- 1971–1973: Parliamentary Secretary of Education
- 1973–1974: Deputy Minister of Finance
- 1974–1976: Deputy Minister of Coordination of Public Corporations
- 1976–1978: Deputy Minister of Trade and Industry
- 1978–1982: Minister of Information
- 1987–1999: Minister of Information

Faction represented in Dewan Rakyat
- 1969–1974: Alliance Party
- 1974–1999: Barisan Nasional

Other roles
- 1982–1985: Ambassadors to Indonesia

Personal details
- Born: 4 January 1938 Pulai, Johor Bahru, Johor, Unfederated Malay States, British Malaya (now Malaysia)
- Died: 1 January 2010 (aged 71) Bukit Damansara, Kuala Lumpur, Malaysia
- Resting place: Bukit Kiara Muslim Cemetery, Kuala Lumpur, Malaysia
- Children: Nur Jazlan Mohamed
- Education: University of Indonesia
- Occupation: Politician

Mohamed bin Rahmat (4 January 1938 – 1 January 2010) was a Malaysian politician, and former Information Minister of Malaysia (1978–1982, 1987–1999). He was famously known as Tok Mat, Mat Setia and Mat Mr Propaganda.

== Personal life ==
Mohamed Rahmat was born on 4 January 1938 in the village of Pulai, Johor Bahru, Johor.

== Political career ==
Mohamed Rahmat first elected as Member of Parliament of Johore Bahru Barat seat in 1969. He was appointed as Parliamentary Secretary to the Minister of Education in Tun Razak first cabinet. He was the Member of Parliament for Pulai from 1969 to 1999 representing UMNO-Barisan Nasional. He was also appointed for a short time as the ambassador to Indonesia with a ministerial rank from 1982 to 1984.

Rahmat was appointed as the Secretary-General of both the party of United Malays National Organisation from 1988 to 1996 and the ruling coalition of Barisan Nasional from 1988 to 1999.

== Career as Minister of Information ==
Rahmat has served as the Minister of Information two times from 1978 to 1982 and from 1987 to 1999.

As the Minister of Information, Mohamed introduced the "Setia Bersama Rakyat" (Semarak) programme which was aimed at instilling patriotism among the people.

One notorious account from his post in office was when he ordered rock singers to trim their long hair if they wanted to participate in programmes aired by public broadcaster Radio Televisyen Malaysia in 1992. Among those who followed the directive were the rock groups Wings, with lead singer Awie; and Search, with lead singer Amy.

== Death ==
Mohamed Rahmat died on 1 January 2010 in Kuala Lumpur at the age of 71, just three days before his 72nd birthday. His body was laid to rest at the Bukit Kiara Muslim Cemetery, Kuala Lumpur.

Former Prime Minister Mahathir Mohamad expressed his condolences to the family of Mohamed Rahmat. He acknowledged the excellent service that Mohamed provided during his time as a minister, stating that he greatly appreciated his contributions. Mahathir also mentioned his gratitude for Mohamed's service both as a minister in his cabinet and later as Malaysia's Ambassador to Indonesia, holding the rank of minister.

== Legacy ==
Several places and honours were named after him, including:

- Kompleks Tan Sri Mohammad Rahmat in Tampoi, Johor Bahru, Johor.

== Election results ==
Parliament of Malaysia
Year	Constituency	Candidate	Votes	Pct	Opponent(s)	Votes	Pct	Ballots cast	Majority	Turnout
1969	P101 Johore Bahru Barat	Mohamed Rahmat (UMNO)	12,319	65.28%	Daing Ibrahim Othman (DAP)	6,553	34.72%	19,789	5,766	93.51%
1974	P113 Pulai	Mohamed Rahmat (UMNO)	18,835	75.79%	A. Razak Ahmad (PSRM)	6,015	24.21%	26,346	12,820	81.73%
1978	P113 Pulai	Mohamed Rahmat (UMNO)	29,717	88.05%	Abdul Hamid Abdul Rahim (PAS)	4,034	11.95%	Unknown	25,683	Unknown
1982	P113 Pulai	Mohamed Rahmat (UMNO)	33,861	77.02%	Abdullah Abdul Hamid (DAP)	10,105	22.98%	46,412	23,756	75.71%
1986	P131 Pulai	Mohamed Rahmat (UMNO)	21,743	64.33%	Gurdial Singh Nijan Sadu Singh (PSRM)	12,056	35.67%	34,904	9,687	70.75%
1990	P131 Pulai	Mohamed Rahmat (UMNO)	29,855	62.93%	A. Razak Ahmad (PRM)	17,583	37.07%	49,140	12,272	76.08%
1995	P142 Pulai	Mohamed Rahmat (UMNO)	36,871	83.16%	Omar Sharif (S46)	7,468	16.84%	45,946	29,403	67.16%

== Honours ==
=== Honours of Malaysia ===
- Malaysia
  - Commander of the Order of Loyalty to the Crown of Malaysia (PSM) – Tan Sri (2000)
  - Officer of the Order of the Defender of the Realm (KMN) (1972)
- Johor
  - Knight Grand Commander of the Order of the Crown of Johor (SPMJ) – Dato' (1975)
  - Knight Grand Companion of the Order of Loyalty of Sultan Ismail of Johor (SSIJ) – Dato' (1977)
  - Knight Commander of the Order of the Crown of Johor (DPMJ) – Dato' (1973)
  - Sultan Ibrahim Medal (PIS)
  - Star of Sultan Ismail (BSI)
- Malacca
  - Grand Commander of the Exalted Order of Malacca (DGSM) – Datuk Seri (1997)
- Pahang
  - Knight Grand Companion of the Order of the Crown of Pahang (SIMP) – formerly Dato', now Dato' Indera (1987)
- Sabah
  - Grand Commander of the Order of Kinabalu (SPDK) – Datuk Seri Panglima (1995)
- Sarawak
  - Knight Commander of the Most Exalted Order of the Star of Sarawak (PNBS) – formerly Dato', now Dato Sri (1981)
- Selangor
  - Knight Grand Companion of the Order of Sultan Salahuddin Abdul Aziz Shah (SSSA) – Dato' Seri (1990)
  - Knight Commander of the Order of the Crown of Selangor (DPMS) – Dato' (1988)
- Terengganu
  - Knight Grand Commander of the Order of the Crown of Terengganu (SPMT) – Dato' (1996)
