= Penawar =

Political subdivision in Malaysia

Penawar (N38)
Johor constituency

State constituency
- Legislature: Johor State Legislative Assembly
MLA
Fauziah Misri
BN
- Constituency created: 2003
- First contested: 2004
- Last contested: 2026

Demographics
- Population (2020): 40,534
- Electors (2026): 31,112
- Area (km²): 468

Penawar is a state constituency in Johor, Malaysia, that is represented in the Johor State Legislative Assembly.

The state constituency was first contested in 2004 and is mandated to return a single Assemblyman to the Johor State Legislative Assembly under the first-past-the-post voting system.

== Demographics ==
As of 2020, Penawar has a population of 40,534 people.

Ethnic breakdown of Penawar's electorate as of 2026
1. Malay (97.4%)
2. Other ethnicities (1.60%)
3. Indian (0.70%)
4. Chinese (0.50%)

== History ==
=== Polling districts ===
According to the gazette issued on 2 July 2026, the Penawar constituency has a total of 10 polling districts.

State constituency	Polling districts	Code	Location
Penawar（N38）	Air Tawar 1	157/38/01	SK (FELDA) Air Tawar 1
Penawar（N38）	Air Tawar 4	157/38/02	SK (FELDA) Air Tawar 4
Penawar（N38）	Papan Timor	157/38/03	SMK Bandar Mas
Penawar（N38）	Penawar	157/38/04	SK Bandar Penawar
Penawar（N38）	Sungai Mas	157/38/05	SK LKTP Sungai Mas
Penawar（N38）	Bandar Mas	157/38/06	SK Bandar Mas
Penawar（N38）	Air Tawar 5	157/38/07	SK (FELDA) Air Tawar 5
Penawar（N38）	Semenchu	157/38/08	SK (FELDA) Semenchu
Penawar（N38）	Sungai Layau	157/38/09	SK Kampong Layau
Penawar（N38）	Tanjong Buai	157/38/10	SK Tanjong Buai

=== Representation history ===
Members of the Legislative Assembly for Penawar
Assembly	No	Years	Member	Party
Constituency created from Pengerang and Sedili
11th	N38	2004–2008	Mohd 'Azam Razuan	BN (UMNO)
12th	N38	2008–2013	Hamimah Mansor	BN (UMNO)
13th	N38	2013–2018	Hamimah Mansor	BN (UMNO)
14th	N38	2018–2022	Sharifah Azizah Syed Zain	BN (UMNO)
15th	N38	2022–2026	Fauziah Misri	BN (UMNO)
16th	N38	2026–present	Fauziah Misri	BN (UMNO)

== Election results ==
Johor state election, 2026: Penawar
Party	Candidate	Votes	%	∆%
BN	Fauziah Misri	19,213	82.12	▲15.14
PN	Fairulnizar Rahmat	3,437	14.69	▼21.78
PH	Mohd Saludin Soleh	747	3.19	▲0.55
Total valid votes		23,397	100.00	
Total rejected ballots		213		
Unreturned ballots		23		
Turnout		23,633	75.96	▲12.83
Registered electors		31,112		
Majority		15,776	67.43	▲26.92
BN hold		Swing		

Johor state election, 2022: Penawar
Party	Candidate	Votes	%	∆%
BN	Fauziah Misri	12,409	66.98	▼3.37
PN	Mohd Faizal Asmar	4,904	26.47	▲26.47
PH	Norazila Sanip	693	3.74	▼25.91
PEJUANG	Rahmattullah Kamilin	521	2.81	▲2.81
Total valid votes		18,527	100.00	
Total rejected ballots		300		
Unreturned ballots		70		
Turnout		18,897	63.13	▼21.19
Registered electors		29,933		
Majority		7,505	40.51	▼0.20
BN hold		Swing		

Johor state election, 2018: Penawar
Party	Candidate	Votes	%	∆%
BN	Sharifah Azizah Syed Zain	12,330	70.35	▼16.51
PKR	Ahmad Kamah Nor	5,196	29.65	▲29.65
Total valid votes		17,526	100.00	
Total rejected ballots		255		
Unreturned ballots		340		
Turnout		18,121	84.32	▼4.62
Registered electors		21,490		
Majority		7,134	40.71	▼33.03
BN hold		Swing		

Johor state election, 2013: Penawar
Party	Candidate	Votes	%	∆%
BN	Hamimah Mansor	15,101	86.87	▼2.50
PAS	Anis Afida Mohd Azli	2,283	13.13	▲2.50
Total valid votes		17,384	100.00	
Total rejected ballots		252		
Unreturned ballots		47		
Turnout		17,683	88.94	▲9.81
Registered electors		19,881		
Majority		12,818	73.73	▼5.00
BN hold		Swing		

Johor state election, 2008: Penawar
Party	Candidate	Votes	%	∆%
BN	Hamimah Mansor	11,466	89.37	
PAS	Md Paimon Jasmin	1,364	10.63	
Total valid votes		12,830	100.00	
Total rejected ballots		172		
Unreturned ballots		54		
Turnout		13,056	79.14	▲79.14
Registered electors		16,498		
Majority		10,102	78.74	▲78.74
BN hold		Swing		

Johor state election, 2004: Penawar
Party	Candidate	Votes	%
On the nomination day, Mohd Azam Rauzan won uncontested.
BN	Mohd Azam Rauzan		
Total valid votes			
Total rejected ballots			
Unreturned ballots			
Turnout			
Registered electors		15,549	
Majority			
This was a new constituency created.
