= Hassan Muthalib =

Malaysian animator, film director and critic (born 1945)

- Hassan Muthalib on 2026
- Born: 3 November 1945 (age 80); Alor Setar, Kedah, Unfederated Malay States (now Malaysia)
- Occupations: Animator; Artist; Film director; Film critic; Author
- Years active: 1964–present
- Children: 3

Hassan Abdul Muthalib (born 3 November 1945) is a Malaysian animator, film director and critic, and artist who pioneered Malaysian animation. He was dubbed as the "Father of the Malaysian animation".

== Personal life ==
Hassan is the father of three children. His two sons, Samad Hassan and Ahmad Hassan, are also involved in animation.

== Filmography ==
- Hapuskan Nyamuk Aedes: Gunakan Ubat Jentik-Jentik (1977)
- Selamat Hari Natal (1979)
- Ikuti Peraturan Penggunaan Gas Memasak (1981)
- Hikayat Sang Kancil (1983)
- Mekanik (1983)
- Hikayat Sang Kancil dan Monyet (1984)
- Gagak Yang Bijak (1985)
- Singa Yang Haloba (1986)
- Arnab Yang Sombong (1986)
- Hikayat Sang kancil dan Buaya (1987)
- Jagalah Kebersihan Tandas (1987)
- Hormatilah Tangki Gas Anda (1987)
- Mat Gelap (1990)
- Silat Lagenda (animation film; 1998)
- At the End of Daybreak (2009)
- Zombiku Zombimu Jua (excerpt from Hantu Kak Limah Balik Rumah; 2010)
- Return to Nostalgia (2015)
- The Unsung HERO – Mat Sentol (2016)
- Thottam: The Garden (2017)

== Bibliography ==
- Malaysian Cinema in a Bottle. Merpati Jingga. 2013. ISBN 978-967-0584-01-0
- From Deer Mouse to Mouse: 70 Years of Malaysian Animation. ASWARA. 2016. ISBN 978-983-2538-33-2

== Accolades ==
On 3 September 2018, Hassan with academic, Khoo Kay Kim chosen as the recipients of the 2018 Merdeka Awards presented by the Sultan of Perak, Nazrin Shah of Perak. Other awards received by Hassan include:

- Merdeka Awards 2018
- Bapa Animasi Malaysia 2012
- Perintis Animasi Asia
- Ikon Animasi Kolej Komuniti 2010
- Kesan Khas Terbaik 1990
- Tokoh Seni Dalam Buku Pendidikan Seni Sekolah Tingkatan 1
- Anugerah Juri Dokumentari Terbaik 1989
- Anugerah Seri Angkasa 1983
