= Racial politics =

Use of race in political discourse

Racial politics or race politics is the use of race, as a human categorization or hierarchical identifier, in political discourse, campaigns, or within the societal and cultural climate created by such practice. The phenomenon can involve the activity of political actors exploiting the issue of race to forward an agenda.

== North America ==
=== Canada ===
Rosemary Brown has been described as one of the earliest politicians to attempt to challenge the divisive racial politics of Canada during the 1975 New Democratic Party leadership election.

In 2015, Jagmeet Singh campaigned against police carding, in what Maclean's described was "racial politics were at the crux" of the policy. Ahead of the 2019 Canadian federal election, while describing them as "conditional multiculturalists", a National Observer analysis stated that white Canadians did not easily engage in racial politics.

=== United States ===
One of the uses of the term racial politics in the United States is to describe racially charged political actions by Abigail Thernstrom, the vice chairman of the US Commission on Civil Rights. The practice has been a major part of American government since its creation, and often divides the Democratic and Republican Parties.

The United States government has since the time of its creation been divided, and in many ways developed based upon issues of race. In 1861, the Civil War between the Northern and Southern states of the nation was fought primarily over the Confederacy's practice of enslaving African Americans based solely on their race.

Furthermore, the tension between the Northern Republicans and Southern Democrats continued for many years after as the South created Jim Crow laws and continued the segregation of individuals of color. The racial divide in the nation continued.

In 1896, the Supreme Court of the United States determined that the "separate but equal" doctrine was constitutional in the case Plessy v. Ferguson. Segregation was legal, so long as the segregated schools and facilities provided to whites and blacks were equal. Plaintiff Homer Plessy, tested the law that required separate accommodations for blacks and whites on railroads.

In 1954, the ruling of Plessy v. Ferguson was overturned in the Supreme Court case Brown v. Board of Education. The Supreme Court determined that the establishment of separate schools for whites and blacks was inherently unequal and unconstitutional. This was a major success for civil rights advocates, including the NAACP.

In 1967, California Governor Ronald Reagan signed the Mulford Act as reaction to growing racial politics in the country. Supported by the National Rifle Association of America, the motivation of the Act has been described as racially motivated, in relation to the growing Black Panther movement.

In 1997, the interim replacement of Yvonne Gonzalez with a white man as Dallas Independent School District superintendent, was met with public unrest due to the racial politics of the situation.

Another concept within the discussion of racial politics is the re-drawing and shaping of district lines. The left of the political spectrum argues that this is done to seclude minorities in certain areas.

Under the Bandemer plurality's test, a redistricting plan constitutes an unconstitutional partisan gerrymander only if it "will consistently degrade a voter's or a group of voters' influence on the political process as a whole." In doing this, Republicans and Democrats alike ensure certain trends in voting patterns and constituent concerns, as they place a high concentration of minorities within a voting district. This is a crucial aspect of modern-day politics and is often a major factor in elections.

By 2019, racial politics was being increasingly identified as a re-emergent phenomenon, with some media describing it at its most extreme in the history of the United States. In October 2019, on the death of Elijah Cummings, a CNN analysis discussed the congressman's understanding of racial politics in the US, praising his ability to "navigate a white world - how to get along with white Americans as a means of better holding the country to account".

== Oceania ==
=== Australia ===
In 2014, Vox reported how "Australia's twisted racial politics created horrific detention camps for immigrants", such as Nauru Regional Processing Centre, describing the country's treatment of immigrants as a return to the racial insecurities of white Australians and the white supremacy of the 20th-century White Australia policy.

Rita Panahi publicly dismissed Australian basketball player Ben Simmons' claim that he was refused entry to Crown Melbourne due to his race in August 2019. Panahi wrote that "He seems to be afflicted by this racial politics that everyone in the US has gone nuts with where they see everything with a filter of race". In October 2019, author Peter FitzSimons stated that his latest book on James Cook, was an attempt to improve the racial politics of the country, which he compared unfavorably with New Zealand's race relations.

== Asia ==
=== Malaysia ===
During the 1982 general election campaign, Prime Minister Mahathir Mohamad argued that Malaysia could not be effectively governed by a government supported by only one ethnic group. He stated that Barisan Nasional, as a multiethnic coalition, represented all communities and urged voters to reject politicians who exploited racial issues for political gain.

Malaysian politician Chang Ko Youn said "Malaysia has practiced racial politics for 51 years and we know it is divisive as each party only talks on behalf of the racial group it represents... When all races are in a single party, no one person will try to be the champion of the party.... It is easy to be a Malay hero, a Malaysian Chinese hero or a Malaysian Indian hero but it is difficult to be a Malaysian hero." Chris Anthony wrote that the people voted against racial politics after 50 years of cooperation, but the politicians still did not listen.

On August 13, 2008, a letter was sent to The Star with the title "Why we can't get our experts to return" saying:

THE most important asset of a country is not its natural resources but its human resources. This is especially true in a knowledge-based economy, which will be the trend in future if it is not already the trend in most Western countries.

Malaysian writer A. Asohan wrote that race politics increasingly became a factor growing up, with some accusing people of being race traitors for befriending others. Asohan recalls "The racist rot seems to have intensified over the subsequent generations. The bigotry we learned as adults are now being picked up by our primary schoolkids." Their leaders would talk about racial tolerance without accepting and appreciating other races and cultures. Asohan argues that while Malaysians felt racial intolerance got worse, they were always racist, and humans in general have always tried to discriminate over something.

Marina Mahathir wrote that race politics had not gone away, "and some people reacted as if ethnic cleansing had just taken place." Politician Datuk Ngeh Koo Ham considered racial politics to be his greatest dislike in regard to Malaysians. Philip Bowring of International Herald Tribune wrote that the political organization of Malaysia has long been largely on racial lines, and Islam has, at times, become a device for use in racial politics, a yardstick for measuring the commitment of competing parties to Malay racial advancement.

In 2019, the Malay Mail reported how the 2019 Tanjung Piai by-election would be an opportunity to move away from racial politics, by respecting the racial pluralism of Mohamed Farid Md Rafik, after his unexpected death.

==== The rich ====
In 2006, Datuk Seri Anwar Ibrahim, on his release from 6 years of prison, said in a number of interviews that the NEP should be abolished and that all races should be given equal opportunities. He claimed only the cronies of the UMNO party became rich from it. Khairy Jamaluddin from UMNO responded "What cheek he has to speak" and said that Anwar Ibrahim was the greatest UMNO party member of all, and a very rich one too.

== In popular culture ==
- The route to the Oscars for 2018 film Green Book was described by TIME magazine as "riddled with missteps and controversies over its authenticity and racial politics."
- Author Judy Nunn's Khaki Town, reviewed by Kerryn Goldsworthy in The Sydney Morning Herald, was described in 2019 as a "complex tale of racial politics and racist behaviour, as practised on both sides of the Pacific".
- The Guardian reviewed 2019's zombie horror-genre film Atlantics, reporting how it had engaged with racial politics.
- In 2020, the Super Bowl LIV halftime show, which featured a co-headlined performance from Jennifer Lopez and Shakira was reported by MoJo magazine to be a feature of the "messy racial politics" in the US, due to the homogenized, non-black representation of Latino culture.

== See also ==
- Apartheid
- Conviction politics
- Diaspora politics
- Identity politics
- Human rights
- Separatism
- White nationalism
- White backlash
- Black nationalism
