= Tan Eng Meng =

Malaysian politician

Yang Berhormat Tan Eng Meng MLA
- 陈勇鸣

Member of the Johor State Legislative Assembly for Pekan Nanas
- Incumbent
- Assumed office 2022
- Preceded by: Yeo Tung Siong

Personal details
- Born: Tan Eng Meng
- Citizenship: Malaysian
- Party: MCA
- Other political affiliations: Barisan Nasional
- Occupation: Politician

Tan Eng Meng is a Malaysian politician from MCA. He has served as the Member of the Johor State Legislative Assembly for Pekan Nanas since 2022.

== Politics ==
On 12 June 2023, Tan replaced Wee Jeck Seng as Chief of MCA Tanjung Piai division. On 10 November 2023, he was elected as Vice Chairman of MCA Johor.

== Election results ==
Johor State Legislative Assembly
Year	Constituency	Candidate	Votes	Pct.	Opponent	Votes	Pct.	Ballot cast	Majority	Turnout
2018	N55 Pekan Nanas	Tan Eng Meng (MCA)	10,548	44.87%	Yeo Tung Siong (DAP)	11,856	51.55%	22,997	1,308	86.43%
2022	N55 Pekan Nanas	Tan Eng Meng (MCA)	11,024	50.49%	Yeo Tung Siong (DAP)	6,189	28.34%	21,835	4,835	60.88%
2022	N55 Pekan Nanas	Tan Eng Meng (MCA)	11,024	50.49%	Tan Chin Hok (Gerakan)	2,741	12.55%	21,835	4,835	60.88%
2022	N55 Pekan Nanas	Tan Eng Meng (MCA)	11,024	50.49%	Hishamuddin Busri (WARISAN)	1,438	6.59%	21,835	4,835	60.88%
2026	N55 Pekan Nanas	Tan Eng Meng (MCA)	19,951	72.23%	Yeo Tung Siong (DAP)	7,670	27.77%	28,065	12,281	75.53%
