= SMS Muzaffar Syah =

Muzaffar Syah Science Secondary School
- Sekolah Menengah Sains Muzaffar Syah

Location
- Ayer Keroh, Malacca, 75450; Malaysia
- Coordinates: 2.2444°N 102.2871°E

Information
- Other name: MOZAC
- Type: Secondary school, Boarding school, Sekolah Berasrama Penuh
- Motto: Bersikap Membina (Be Constructive)
- Established: 1973
- School district: Ayer Keroh
- School code: MEE2141
- Principal: Masitah Salamat
- Teaching staff: 61
- Forms: 1-5
- Gender: Coeducational
- Enrollment: 751 (2022)
- Classes: Alpha, Beta, Omega, Sigma, Theta
- Language: Malay, English
- Houses: Bendahara; Syahbandar; Laksamana; Temenggung
- Colours: Yellow and Blue
- Song: Bersikap Membina
- Yearbook: Pembina
- Affiliation: Sekolah Berasrama Penuh, Ministry of Education (Malaysia)
- Alumni: Alumni Mozac
- Website: mozac.edu.my

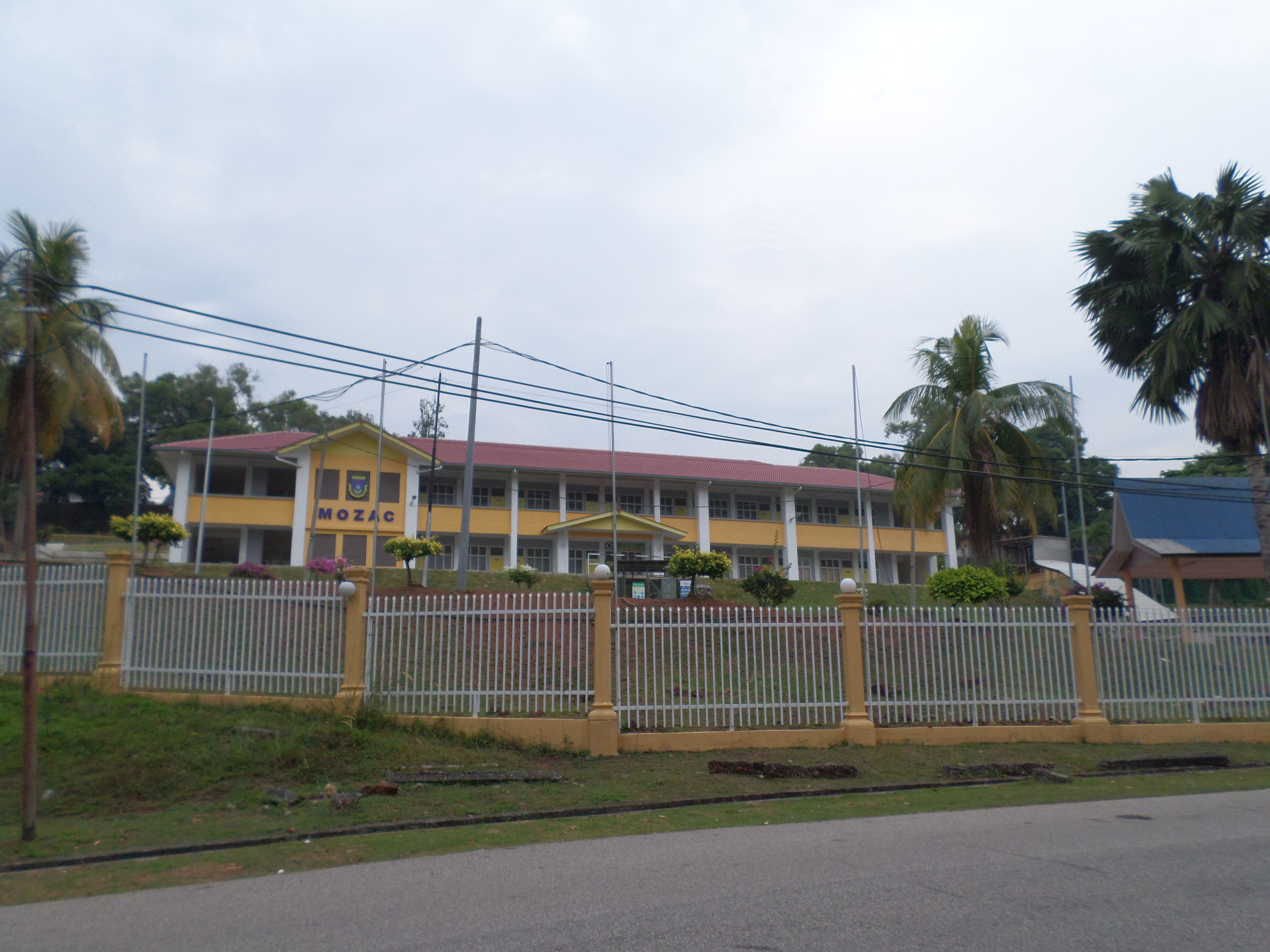
Alumni building.

Sekolah Menengah Sains Muzaffar Syah (English: Muzaffar Syah Science Secondary School; known by its acronym MOZAC) is the first science school in the state of Malacca, Malaysia. It was established in 1973 under the Second Malaysia Plan as the first boarding school (Sekolah Berasrama Penuh) in the state. The school was built on the top of a hilly area in Ayer Keroh, at 121.9 meters above sea level and in an area encompassing 12.9 hectare. Its buildings were completed in 1976 and officiated in 1983 as Sekolah Menengah Sains Melaka, later renamed Sekolah Muzaffar Syah Melaka after the fourth Sultan of the Malacca Sultanate. In 2010, the school received the High Performance School award. The school is specialised in green technology, agriculture, robotics and electronics. The school were also an adopted school for Multimedia University.

== History ==
This school, formerly known as Sekolah Menengah Sains Melaka, was established in a hilly area with a height of 121.9 meters above sea level. The original area was 12.9 hectares. The history of this school began on 5 January 1973. On this date, a total of 120 Form 1 students consisting of 80 male students and 40 female students as pioneers were placed at SMK Munsyi Abdullah, Batu Berendam, Melaka while waiting for the school construction. Due to the slow completion of the Muzaffar Syah Science Secondary School building, the students were transferred to Sekolah Menengah Sains Johor in Kluang the following year.

On 3 January 1976, a total of 120 Form 1 students were placed again at SMK Munsyi Abdullah.

They were placed at Melaka Science Secondary School, Melaka on 10 May 1976. Initially, the school had 22 classrooms, offices, libraries, staff rooms, language labs, media rooms, counseling rooms, cooperatives, living skills workshops for Household Economy (ERT) and Latest Manipulative Skills (KMT), dentist clinic, quarantine room, dormitory office and others.

In 1978, in collaboration with the Matriculation Unit of Universiti Kebangsaan Malaysia (UKM), the school was entrusted to conduct the Matriculation Course, an intensive one-year course for students of Universiti Kebangsaan Malaysia. The first group of students in this Matriculation Course consists of 102 students from all over Malaysia. Form 6 was discontinued and the UKM Matriculation class was resumed by starting the Engineering Science Matriculation Class.

In October 1983, the school, originally named Sekolah Menengah Sains Melaka, was officially changed to Sekolah Menengah Sains Muzaffar Syah, taking its name from Sultan Muzaffar Syah, the fourth Sultan of Melaka Malay Sultanate. The inauguration of this name change was officiated by His Excellency the Yang di-Pertua Negeri of Melaka, Tun Syed Zahiruddin bin Syed Hassan.

In 1998, the school was recognized as one of the 88 Smart Schools in Malaysia. In 2001, the Al-Abrar surau was built and inaugurated by the Yang di-Pertua Negeri Melaka as well as the construction of spotlights in schools, hostels and fields. To encourage student engagement with ICT, school policy allows students to bring their own laptops. The school is also provided with free Wi-Fi service by the Melaka Government.

In 2007, the MOZAC field became the training ground for Manchester United for the 2007 Youth Champions Cup and was also upgraded to a 5 Star Sekolah Bestari. In 2008, a landslide occurred. Most of the top of the field was badly affected. In the same year, the school gained Cluster School status followed by High Performance School in 2010.

In 2017, the school consists of form one to form five students where each form has five classes (Alpha, Beta, Omega, Sigma and Theta). Since then, MOZAC have 2 classes of Dual-Language Programme (DLP) in each grade which used Malay and English as communication language.

== List of principals ==
Year Start	Principal's Name
1973	:3
1976	Yahaya Mayah
1982	Ismail Adnan
1985	Yaacob Ederis
1988	Osman Busu
1992	Ramli Mohammad
1995	Sairi Tahir
1997	Mohd Zin Abdul Hamid
2003	Khairil Awang
2005	Baharuddin Burhan
2011	Hassan Topit
2015	Abdul Malek Harun
2016	Mohd Ghazali Ahmad
2019	Md Baharuddin Mahani
2021	Che Romas Binti Noor
2023	Masita Binti Salamat@Samadon

== Facilities ==
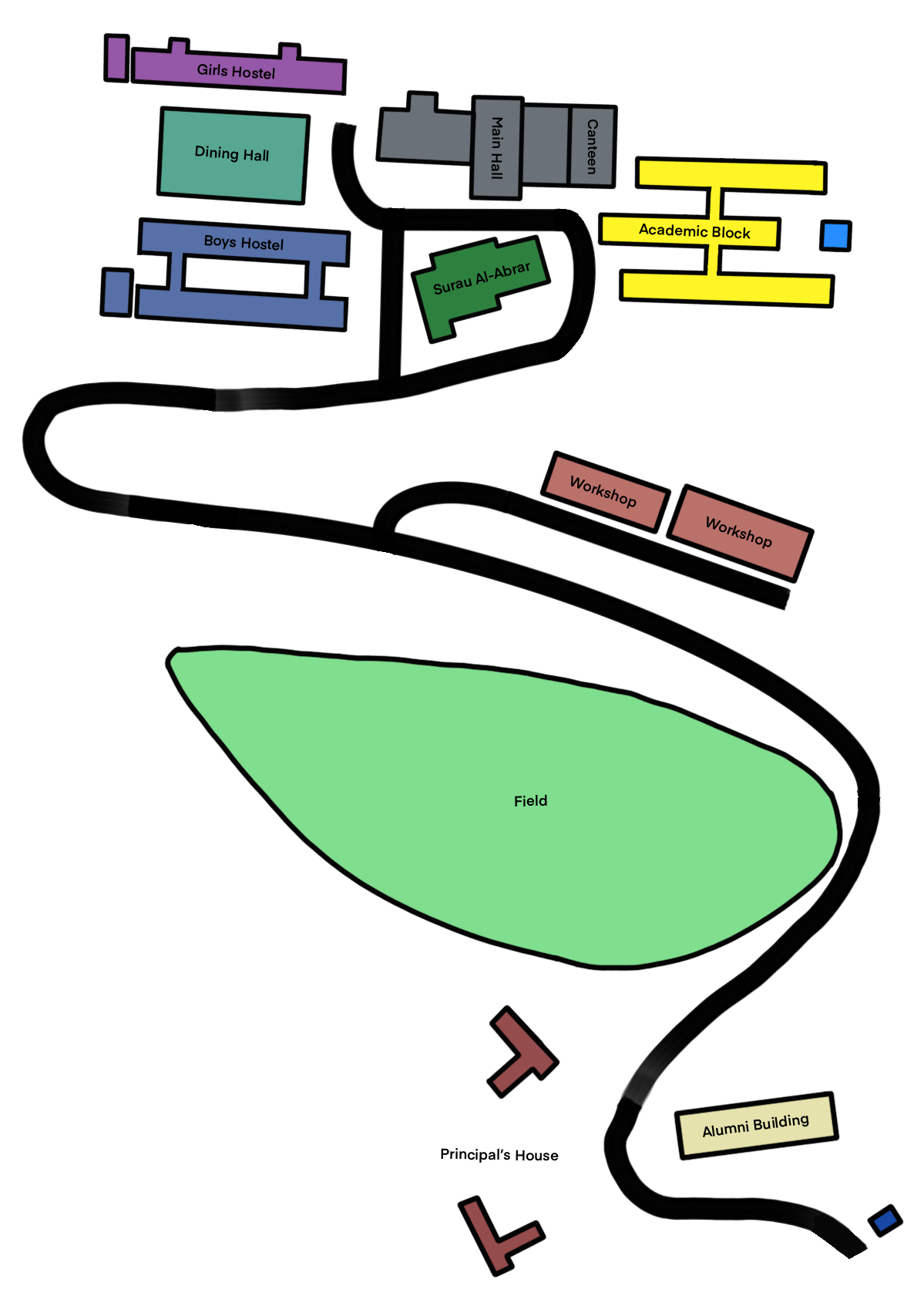

There are generally a total of 3 building blocks that house MOZAC students. 2 of them are combined blocks that house male students while a separate block houses female students. Asrama puteri (Aspuri) and Asrama putera (Aspura) are separated by Dewan Sultan Megat Iskandar Syah which is the dining hall of this school.

The new Surau Al-Abrar which was completed in 2016 replaces the old Surau Al-Abrar. The construction of this surau took 2 years. This Surau was designed with open-concept because MOZAC's high position has already made ventilation in the surau a matter that does not need to be given attention. The management of this surau is placed entirely on the Body of Da'wah and Islamic Spirituality (BADRI). They are responsible for managing cleanliness and supervising programs such as the recitation of Surah Al-Kahfi on Fridays.

In 2021, the front road of the school has been collapsed until 2023.

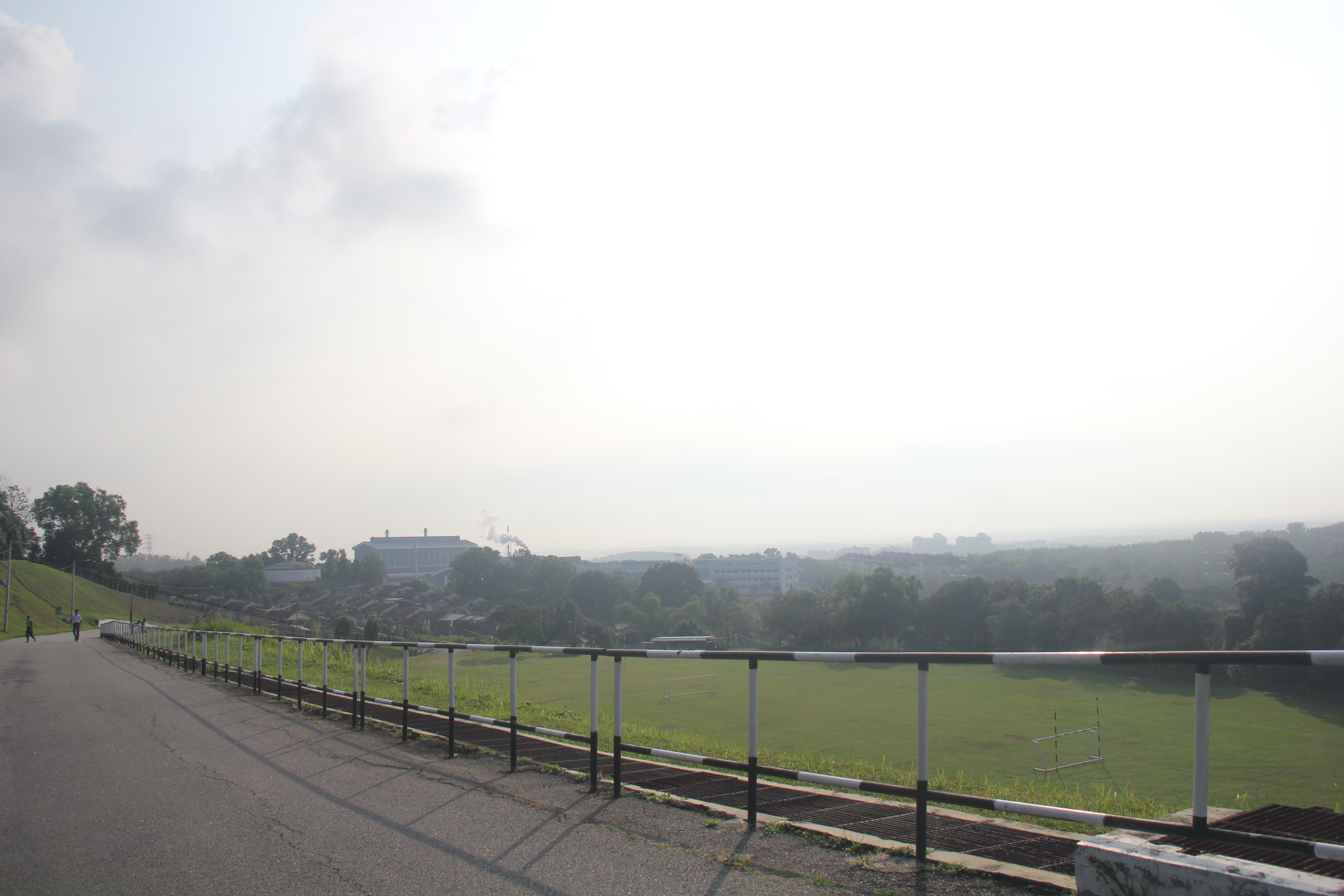
School View

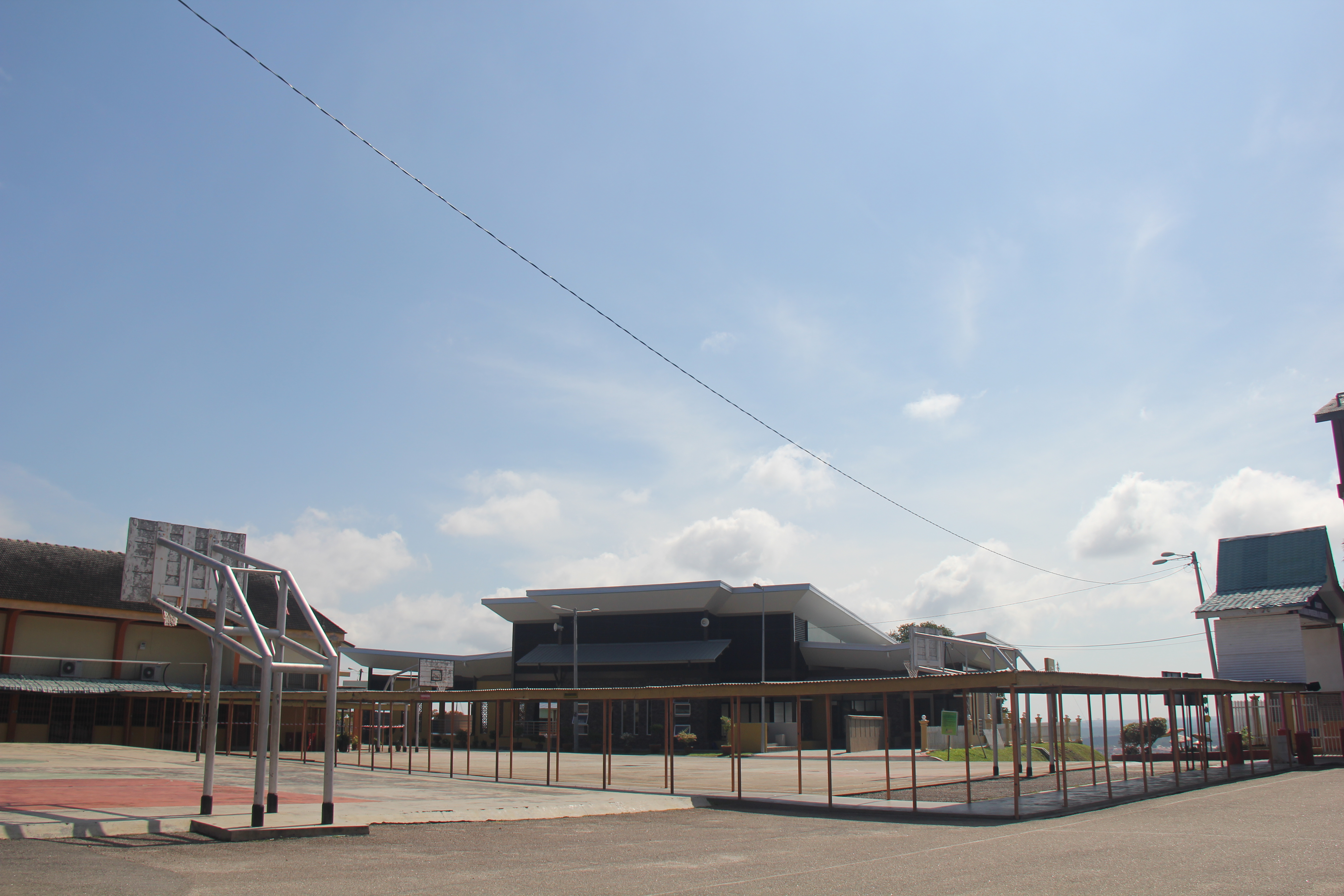
Al-Abrar View

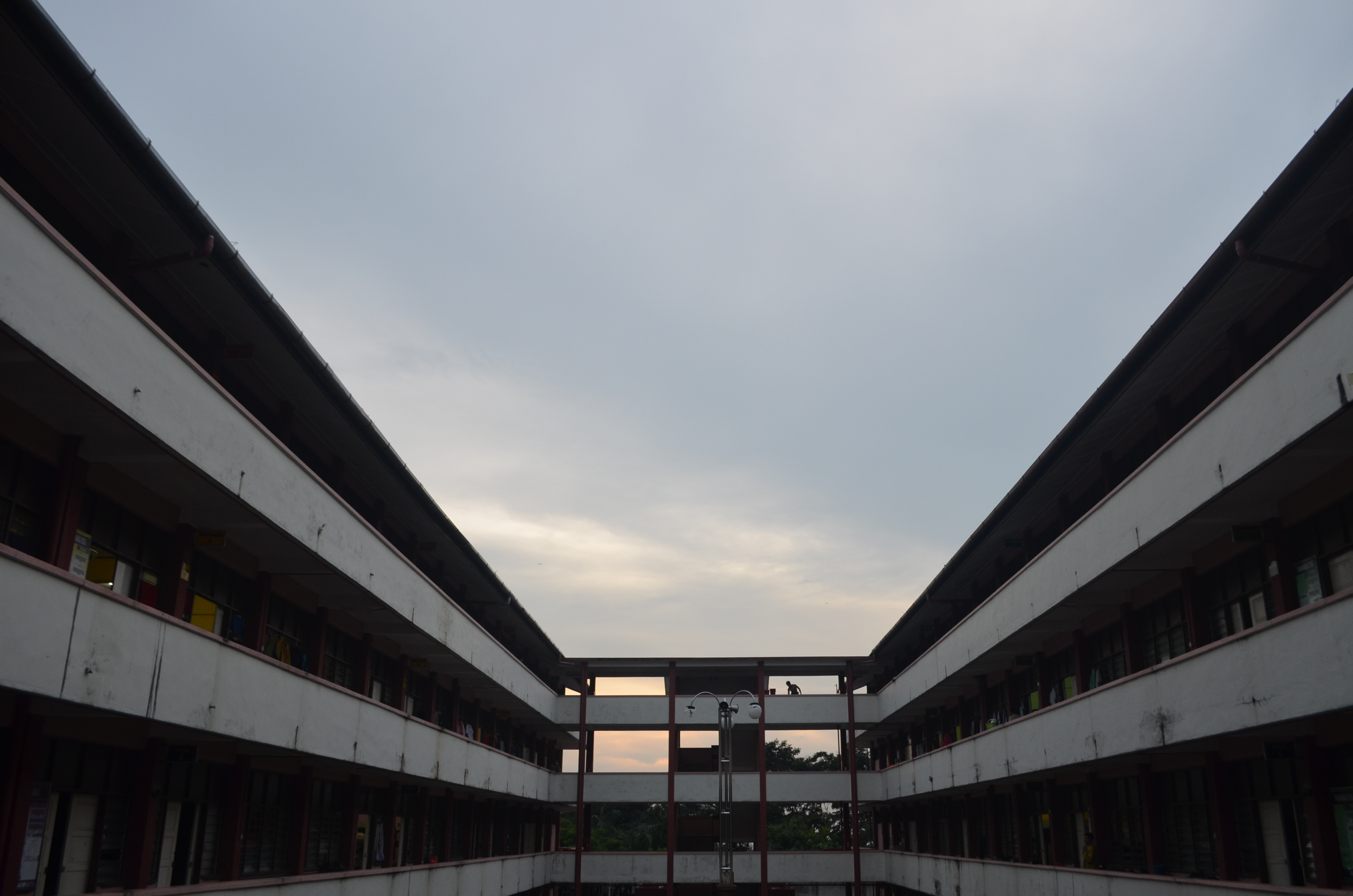
Boys Hostel (2017)

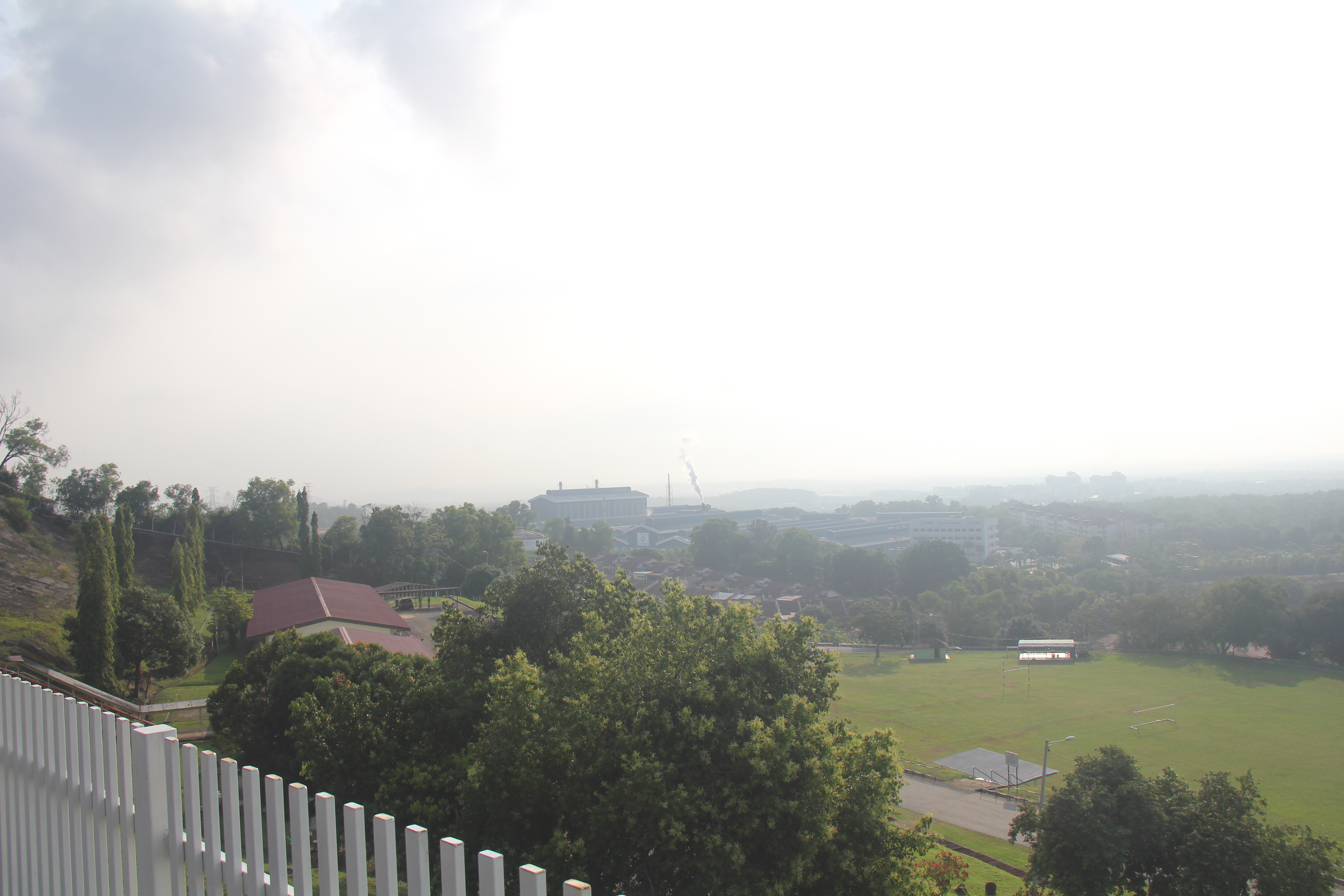
View from School

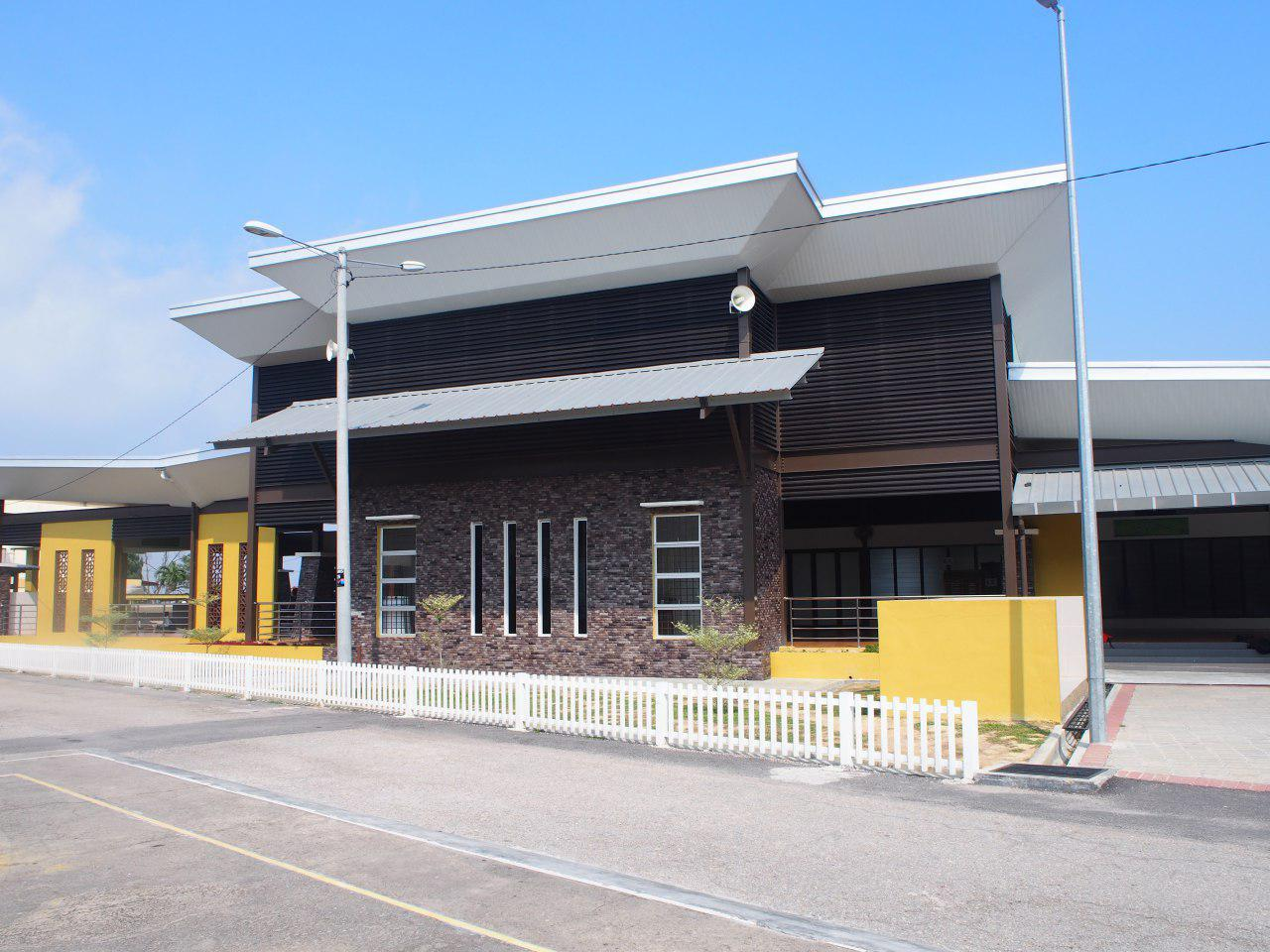
Surau Al-Abrar (2017)

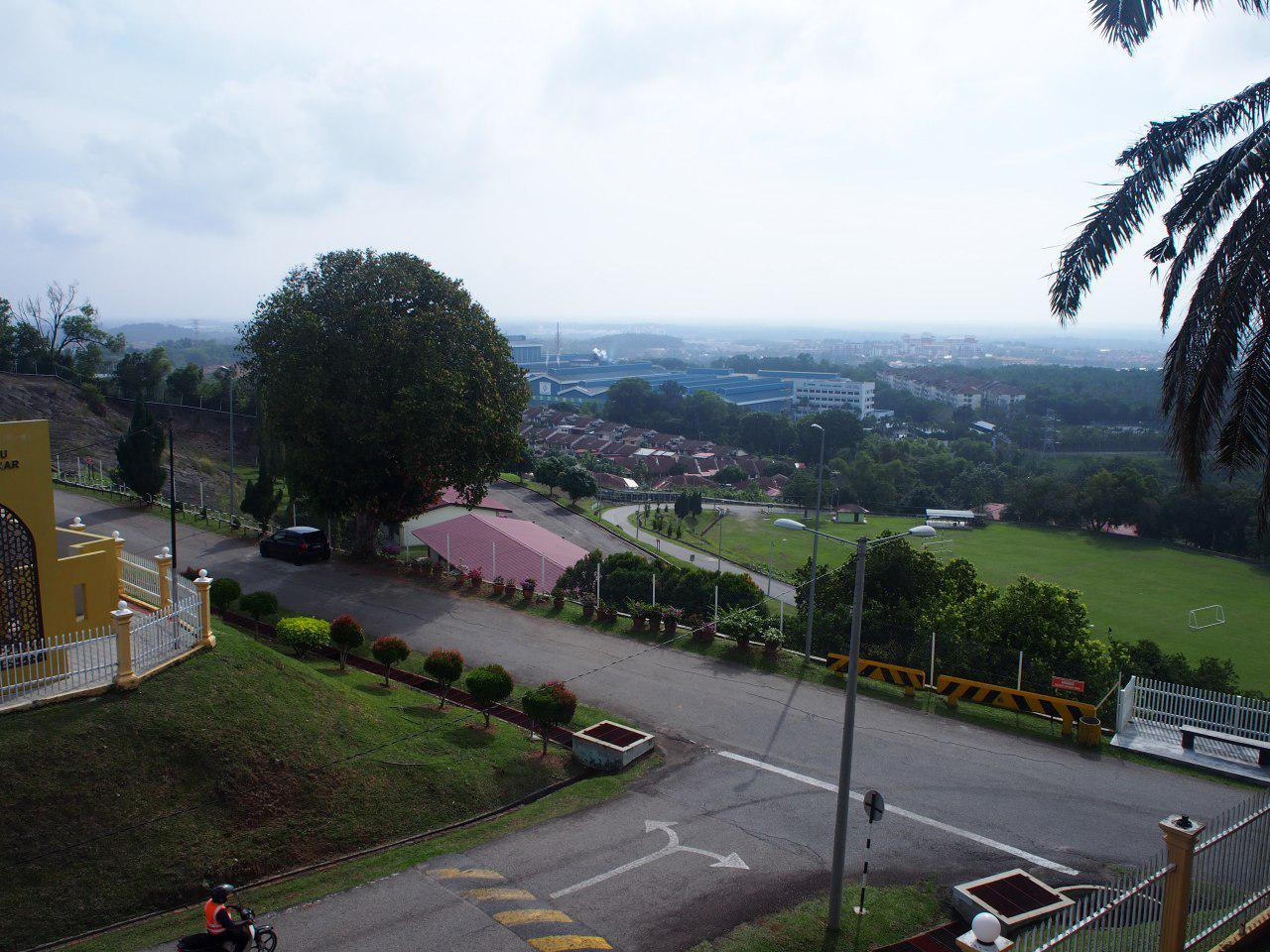
School Panorama

== Notable alumni ==
- Idris Haron – 10th Chief Minister of Malacca,
- Dr. Mohamed Farid bin Md Rafik - Former Deputy Minister in the Prime Minister's Department (National Unity and Social Wellbeing), former MP of Tanjung Piai.
- Dr Sabirin Ja’afar - Universiti Teknikal Malaysia Melaka Pro-Chancellor
