= 2010 Malaysian Chinese Association leadership election =

- 28 March 2010
Candidate	Chua Soi Lek	Ong Ka Ting	Ong Tee Keat
Popular vote	901	833	578
President of MCA before election
Ong Tee Keat
President of MCA
Chua Soi Lek

A leadership election was held by the Malaysian Chinese Association (MCA) on 28 March 2010. It was won by then Deputy President of MCA, Chua Soi Lek.

== Central Committee election results ==
=== President ===
Candidate	Delegates' votes
Chua Soi Lek	901 votes
Ong Ka Ting	833 votes
Ong Tee Keat	578 votes

=== Deputy President ===
Candidate	Delegates' votes
Liow Tiong Lai	1,171 votes
Kong Cho Ha	1,106 votes

=== Vice Presidents ===
Candidate	Delegates' votes (max. 4)
Ng Yen Yen	1,528 votes
Donald Lim Siang Chai	1,469 votes
Chor Chee Heung	1,202 votes
Gan Ping Sieu	1,202 votes
Edward Khoo Keok Hai	votes
Yap Pian Hon	votes
Yew Teong Look	votes
Alex Wong Siong Hwee	votes
Yeow Chai Thiam	votes
Loke Yuen Yow	votes

=== Central Working Committee Members ===
Candidate	Delegates' votes (max. 25)
Lee Chee Leong	1,430 votes
Hou Kok Chung	1,312 votes
Heng Seai Kie	1,267 votes
Wee Jeck Seng	1,175 votes
Toh Chin Yaw	1,142 votes
Tee Siew Kiong	1,141 votes
Gan Tian Loo	1,117 votes
Tan Chai Ho	1,114 votes
Ong Ka Chuan	1,104 votes
Lee Wei Kiat	1,100 votes
Loh Seng Kok	1,086 votes
Hoh Khai Mun	1,077 votes
Liew Yuen Keong	1,059 votes
Tan Cheng Liang	1,054 votes
Koh Nai Kwong	1,040 votes
Por Choo Chor	1,037 votes
Tan Ken Ten	999 votes
Kong Sing Chu	981 votes
Chong Itt Chew	975 votes
Yoo Wei How	974 votes
Tan Ah Eng	969 votes
Wong Koon Bun	953 votes
Ti Lian Ker	929 votes
Teh Kim Poo	864 votes
Chuah Poh Khiang	851 votes
	votes
	votes
	votes
	votes
	votes
	votes
	votes
	votes
	votes
	votes
	votes
	votes
	votes
	votes
	votes
	votes
	votes
	votes
	votes
	votes
	votes
	votes
	votes
	votes
	votes
	votes
	votes
	votes
	votes
	votes
	votes
	votes
	votes
	votes
	votes
	votes
	votes
	votes
	votes
	votes
	votes
	votes
	votes
	votes
	votes
	votes
	votes
	votes
	votes
	votes
	votes
	votes
	votes
	votes
	votes
	votes
	votes
	votes
	votes
