= Yeo Tung Siong =

Malaysian politician

- 杨敦祥
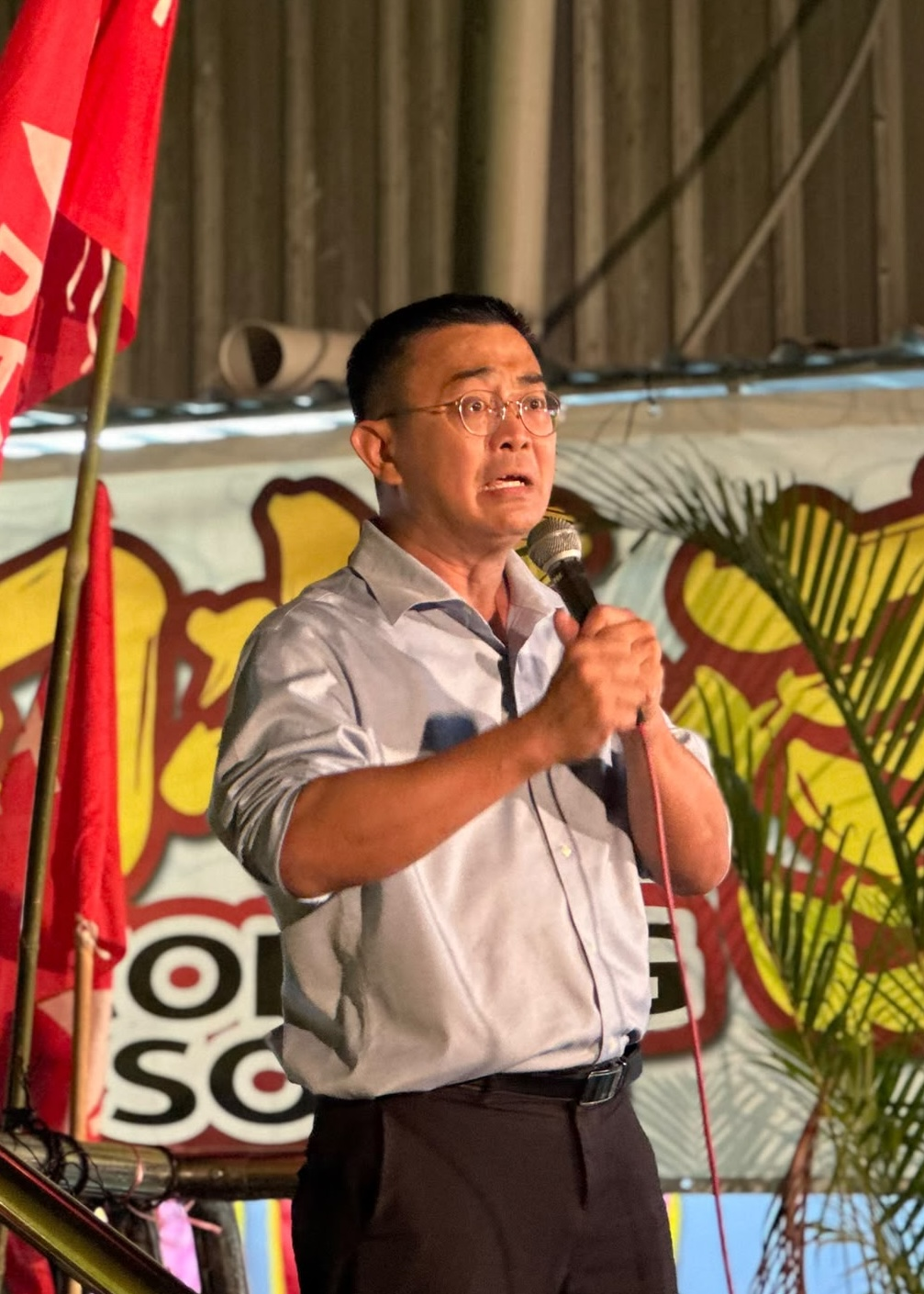

Member of the Johor State Legislative Assembly for Pekan Nanas
- In office 2013 – 22 January 2022
- Preceded by: Tang Nai Soon
- Succeeded by: Tan Eng Meng

Personal details
- Born: Yeo Tung Siong; 25 April 1979 (age 47)
- Citizenship: Malaysian
- Party: Democratic Action Party
- Other political affiliations: Pakatan Rakyat (till 2015); Pakatan Harapan (since 2015)
- Education: University of Technology Malaysia
- Occupation: Politician

Yeo Tung Siong

Chinese name
- Traditional Chinese: 楊敦祥
- Simplified Chinese: 杨敦祥
Transcriptions
Standard Mandarin
- Hanyu Pinyin: Yáng Dūnxiáng
Yue: Cantonese
- Jyutping: Joeng4 Deon1 Coeng4
Southern Min
- Hokkien POJ: Iôⁿ Tun-siông
- Tâi-lô: Iônn Tun-siông

Yeo Tung Siong is a Malaysian politician from DAP. He is the Member of Johor State Legislative Assembly for Pekan Nanas from 2013 to 2022.

== Early career ==
He was a teacher and a Deputy Headmaster of Pei Chun High School.

== Politics ==
He was the special assistant of former Skudai state assemblyman, Boo Cheng Hau. He has been a member of DAP Johor Executive Committee since 2014, and the Chairman of Pakatan Harapan and DAP Tanjung Piai.

Yeo has previously stated that he opposes the Johor state constitutional amendment made by Barisan Nasional assemblymen back in May 2026, which allowed the appointment of five unelected assemblymen in the Johor State Legislative Assembly. He vowed to repeal the amendment if he gets elected back into power.

== Election results ==
Johor State Legislative Assembly
| Year | Constituency | Candidate | Votes | Pct | Opponent(s) | Votes | Pct | Ballots cast | Majority | Turnout |
|---|---|---|---|---|---|---|---|---|---|---|
| 2013 | N55 Pekan Nanas | Yeo Tung Siong (DAP) | 15,436 | 53.77% | Wong You Fong (MCA) | 12,767 | 44.47% | 28,708 | 2,669 | 88.37% |
| 2018 | N55 Pekan Nanas | Yeo Tung Siong (DAP) | 11,856 | 51.55% | Tan Eng Meng (MCA) | 10,548 | 44.87% | 22,997 | 1,308 | 86.43% |
| 2022 | N55 Pekan Nanas | Yeo Tung Siong (DAP) | 6,189 | 28.34% | Tan Eng Meng (MCA) | 11,024 | 50.49% | 21,835 | 4,835 | 60.88% |
| 2022 | N55 Pekan Nanas | Yeo Tung Siong (DAP) | 6,189 | 28.34% | Tan Chin Hok (GERAKAN) | 2,741 | 12.55% | 21,835 | 4,835 | 60.88% |
| 2022 | N55 Pekan Nanas | Yeo Tung Siong (DAP) | 6,189 | 28.34% | Hishamuddin Busri (WARISAN) | 1,438 | 6.59% | 21,835 | 4,835 | 60.88% |
| 2026 | N55 Pekan Nanas | Yeo Tung Siong (DAP) | 7,670 | 27.33% | Tan Eng Meng (MCA) | 19,951 | 71.09% | 28,065 | 12,281 | 74.73% |
