= Mohamed Farid Md Rafik =

Malaysian politician (1976–2019)

Yang Berbahagia Datuk Wira Mohamed Farid Md Rafik DCSM
- محمد فريد بن مد رفيق

Deputy Minister in the Prime Minister's Department (National Unity and Social Wellbeing)
- In office 2 July 2018 – 21 September 2019
- Monarchs: Muhammad V (2018–2019); Abdullah (2019)
- Prime Minister: Mahathir Mohamad
- Minister: Waytha Moorthy Ponnusamy
- Preceded by: Halimah Mohamed Sadique (Deputy Minister of Housing, Local Government and Urban Wellbeing)
- Succeeded by: Ti Lian Ker (Deputy Minister of National Unity)
- Constituency: Tanjung Piai

Member of the Malaysian Parliament for Tanjung Piai
- In office 9 May 2018 – 21 September 2019
- Preceded by: Wee Jeck Seng (BN–MCA)
- Succeeded by: Wee Jeck Seng (BN–MCA)
- Majority: 524 (2018)

Personal details
- Born: 12 October 1976 Serkat, Pontian, Johor, Malaysia
- Died: 21 September 2019 (aged 42) Pontian Hospital, Pontian, Johor, Malaysia
- Cause of death: Heart complications
- Resting place: Sheikh Haji Ahmad Waqf Muslim Cemetery, Kampung Chokoh, Serkat, Pontian, Johor, Malaysia
- Citizenship: Malaysian
- Party: Malaysian United Indigenous Party (BERSATU) (2017–2019)
- Other political affiliations: Pakatan Harapan (PH) (2017–2019)
- Education: Queen's University of Belfast
- Occupation: Politician
- Profession: Anaesthesiologist
- Mohamed Farid Md Rafik on Facebook; Mohamed Farid Md Rafik on Parliament of Malaysia

Mohamed Farid bin Md Rafik (Jawi: محمد فريد بن مد رفيق; 12 October 1976 – 21 September 2019) was a Malaysian politician who was Deputy Minister in the Prime Minister's Department in charge of national unity and social wellbeing in the Pakatan Harapan (PH) administration under former Prime Minister Mahathir Mohamad and former Minister Waytha Moorthy Ponnusamy from July 2018 and the Member of Parliament (MP) for Tanjung Piai from May 2018 to his death in September 2019. He was a member of the Malaysian United Indigenous Party (BERSATU), a former component party of the PH coalition.

== Background ==
Born in 1976, Farid hailed from Serkat, Pontian, Johor. He had his early education at Sekolah Kebangsaan (SK) Andek Mori, Serkat and secondary school later at Sekolah Menengah Sains Muzaffar Syah, Malacca before pursuing his A-Levels education at Bedford Modern School, United Kingdom (UK). He started his medical career in 2001 after graduating with a Bachelor of Medicine degree from University of Belfast, UK. In 2008, he furthered his studies to earn his anaesthesiology degree from College of Anaesthesia, Royal College of Surgeons Ireland (RCSI) and then continued to work as an anaesthesiologist in UK until 2014 before returning to Malaysia after 10 years in UK.

== Politics ==
Prior to entering politics, he worked as an anaesthesiologist in a private hospital in Malacca. Though he was never prepared for politics, he became interested in it after his mother, Norma Mohamed who was former United Malays National Organisation (UMNO) Tanjung Piai Wanita chief, left the party in 2016 for BERSATU. His political career began when he joined BERSATU in 2017.

Farid was first elected as MP winning the Tanjung Piai parliamentary seat with a slim majority of 524 votes by defeating the then incumbent Wee Jeck Seng from the Malaysian Chinese Association (MCA) of Barisan Nasional (BN) coalition and also Nordin Othman from the Pan-Malaysian Islamic Front (BERJASA), which contested under the Pan-Malaysian Islamic Party (PAS) banner through the Gagasan Sejahtera in the 2018 general election (GE14). He was then appointed Deputy Minister in the Prime Minister's Department for National Unity and Social Harmony.

== Election results ==
Parliament of Malaysia
Year	Constituency	Candidate	Votes	Pct	Opponent(s)	Votes	Pct	Ballots cast	Majority	Turnout
2018	P165 Tanjung Piai	Mohamed Farid Md Rafik (BERSATU)	21,255	47.29%	Wee Jeck Seng (MCA)	20,731	46.12%	45,858	524	85.67%
2018	P165 Tanjung Piai	Mohamed Farid Md Rafik (BERSATU)	21,255	47.29%	Nordin Othman (PAS)	2,962	6.59%	45,858	524	85.67%

== Honours ==
- Malacca
  - Knight Commander of the Exalted Order of Malacca (DCSM) – Datuk Wira (2018)

== Death ==
Farid died at Hospital Pontian in Johor on 21 September 2019 of a heart attack. He was laid to rest at the Sheikh Haji Ahmad Waqf Muslim Cemetery in Kampung Chokoh, Serkat, Pontian, Johor at 5.30 pm on the same day. His funeral was attended by more than 1000 people including Prime Minister Mahathir Mohamad. He leaves behind a wife, Farah Syazwani Hanis Ismail, 32, and three daughters – Sophie Farissya, 8, Eva Ariaana, 4 and Zara Aleena, 2.

His death had paved the way for the 2019 Tanjung Piai by-election in which BERSATU of PH candidate had failed to defend the seat and had lost it back to his predecessor, Wee Jeck Seng of BN in the six-cornered fight for the parliamentary seat.
