= 2019 Tanjung Piai by-election =

By-election in Malaysia in 2019

| ← 2018 | 16 November 2019 | 2022 → |

P165 Tanjung Piai seat in the Dewan Rakyat
| | BN | PH | GERAKAN |
| Candidate | Wee Jeck Seng | Karmaine Sardini | Wendy Subramaniam |
| Party | MCA | BERSATU | GERAKAN |
| Alliance | BN | PH |
| Popular vote | 25,466 | 10,380 | 1,707 |
| Percentage | 65.60% | 26.74% | 4.40% |
| | BERJASA | IND | IND |
| Candidate | Badhrulhisham Abd Aziz | Ang Chuan Lock | Faridah Aryani Abd Ghaffar |
| Party | BERJASA | Independent | Independent |
| Alliance | GS |
| Popular vote | 850 | 380 | 32 |
| Percentage | 2.19% | 0.98% | 0.08% |
- P165 Tanjung Piai federal constituency border and its corresponding state assembly seats.
MP before election
Md Farid Md Rafik (died)
Pakatan Harapan (BERSATU)
Elected MP
Wee Jeck Seng
Barisan Nasional (MCA)

The 2019 Tanjung Piai by-election was a by-election held on 16 November 2019 for the Dewan Rakyat seat of Tanjung Piai. It was called following the death of incumbent, Md Farid Md Rafik on 21 September 2019.

The late Md Farid, a member from the Malaysian United Indigenous Party (BERSATU) of Pakatan Harapan (PH) was first elected as Member of Parliament (MP) for Tanjung Piai in Johor defeating the then incumbent Wee Jeck Seng from the Malaysian Chinese Association (MCA) of Barisan Nasional (BN) coalition and Nordin Othman from the Pan-Malaysian Islamic Front (BERJASA), which contested under the Pan-Malaysian Islamic Party (PAS) banner through the Gagasan Sejahtera with a slim majority of 524 votes in 2018 general election (GE14). He was then appointed as Deputy Minister in the Prime Minister's Department for National Unity and Social Well-being.

The Election Commission (EC) had set the polling day for 16 November 2019, early voting on 12 November and nomination day on 2 November with a 14-day campaign period.

The electoral roll in the parliamentary constituency to be used would be the one up to the second quarter of 2019 which was last updated on 23 September 2019 with a total of 52,986 voters made up of 52,698 ordinary voters, 280 early voters while 8 absentee voters (who are abroad). Tanjung Piai is a racially-mixed seat with 57% Malays, 42% Chinese and 1% Indian.

The by-election, the ninth since GE14 will be the first for election in Malaysia in which 18-year-olds and above can contest in an election as a result of the new constitutional amendment. However, voters who haven't achieved 21-years-old aren't eligible to vote in this by-election.

BN's Wee Jeck Seng had won the by-election by a landslide majority of 15,086 votes to return to be the MP for Tanjung Piai again but as an Opposition. BN had claimed 25,466 votes to wrest back the seat they lost in last GE14 from PH which only claimed 10,380 votes.

== Nomination ==
PH deputy president and Johor state chairman Muhyiddin Yassin said the coalition will discuss on the strategy and candidate for the by-election in a meeting on 4 October. BERSATU was expected to decide the candidate to defend the seat for PH; with the full support of other PH component parties; National Trust Party (AMANAH), Democratic Action Party (DAP) and People's Justice Party (PKR) which had indicated their endorsements. Karmaine Sardini, the 66-year-old architect-businessman and Tanjung Piai BERSATU chief, who had lost to BN's Ahmad Maslan in the adjacent Pontian constituency by a slim majority in the GE14 was picked as the PH's candidate on 28 October.

BN component parties were reported jostling for the seat soon after it was vacant. United Malays National Organisation (UMNO) said that it will discuss with other BN counterparts on the candidate for the by-election. MCA had also announced that they are ready to contest to wrest back the seat. BN and UMNO president Ahmad Zahid Hamidi anyway has hinted that UMNO might contest the by-election. Malaysian Indian Congress (MIC) has insisted that MCA should be retained to contest the seat instead of UMNO representing BN. BN had finally chosen Wee Jeck Seng, the 55-year-old Tanjung Piai MCA chief and former two-term Tanjung Piai MP until he had lost narrowly to PH in GE14, as their candidate again to recapture the seat back in the by-election.

President of Parti Gerakan Rakyat Malaysia (GERAKAN), Dominic Lau has confirmed that the party has decided contesting the by-election after sitting out the previous eight by-election. GERAKAN had named its deputy secretary general, Wendy Subramaniam, who is a 38-year-old lawyer of mixed Indian-Chinese parentage from Johor Bahru as their candidate for the by-election. It will be contesting using its own logo back again since 1969 and after it left the BN in 2018 which saw the coalition GE14 downfall.

President of BERJASA which candidate had contested the last general election under the PAS ticket, Badhrulhisham Abdul Aziz had urged the BN to nominate a Malay-Muslim candidate based on the spirit of UMNO-PAS pact of Muafakat Nasional. It even offered to nominate a credible BERJASA Malay candidate for the by election. Following the lack of Malay candidate alternatives in the by-election, BERJASA has confirmed their candidacy for the by-election on their own ticket and their 56-year-old party president, Badhrulhisham Abdul Aziz as their candidate for the by-election

PAS vice-president Mohd Amar Nik Abdullah had stated PAS will support BN candidate and its former secretary-general Mustafa Ali even proposed MCA to contest the seat. PAS president Abdul Hadi Awang has reaffirmed its supports and commitments to campaign for BN even the candidate is from MCA despite the just inked Piagam Muafakat Nasional (National Cooperation Charter) of UMNO-PAS pact.

President of Parti Bumiputera Perkasa Malaysia (PUTRA), Ibrahim Ali had initially said that PUTRA will field a candidate in Tanjung Piai if the contesting parties field non-Malay candidates. Somehow PUTRA decided not to contest the Tanjung Piai by-election as to focus on its preparations for the next general election.

The Gabungan Teksi Se-Malaysia (GTSM) announced that they will field Shamsubahrin Ismail who is the Big Blue Taxi founder as an independent candidate in the by-election to represent the public transport community. Unfortunately, he did not file his nomination papers during Nomination Day as he suffered a heart attack and was replaced with a single mother, Faridah Aryani Abd Ghaffar.

On Nomination Day, 6 candidates including PH's Karmaine, BN's Wee, GERAKAN's Wendy, BERJASA's Badhrulhisham and two independents – Ang Chuan Lock (key logo), 49, tuition centres operator and Faridah Aryani Abd Ghaffar (car logo), 45, a social auditor have registered and has set for a six-cornered fight in the Tanjung Piai polls.

== Controversies and issues ==
UMNO and MCA had expressed their dissatisfaction over EC setting the by-election nomination and polling dates on 2 and 16 November respectively, which will coincide with earlier planned annual general meeting's (AGM) of both parties; MCA's on 2–3 November and UMNO's on 13–16 November. EC in expressing its regret had clarified it was not deliberate and was unavoidable because of the forthcoming Deepavali public holiday on 27 October. Both the parties had decided to defer their AGM to avoid clashing with the by-election crucial dates.

DAP vice-chairperson M. Kulasegaran, who is also Human Resources Minister, in a statement refuting allegations of his connection to the Liberation Tigers of Tamil Eelam (LTTE) militant group, has linked accusations that DAP supports the LTTE to the forth coming Tanjung Piai by-election. He also called on the police to investigate such fake news went viral on social media which following earlier police arrest and detention of seven individuals, including DAP's Malacca state exco cum assemblyman for Gadek G. Saminathan and Negeri Sembilan state assemblyman for Seremban Jaya P. Gunasekaran, over alleged links to the LTTE. PUTRA's president Ibrahim Ali also had claimed the agenda of the LTTE issue is to attract the Malay votes in the by-election.

Johor UMNO chief Hasni Mohammad had said that hopefully there wouldn't be a second by-election the next coming year in relation to the PH candidate's elderly age. Hasni was condemned by BERSATU for mocking the PH candidate's age and predicting his lifespan.

== Results ==
Malaysian general by-election, 2019: Tanjung Piai Upon the death of the incumbent, Md Farid Md Rafik
| Party | Candidate | Votes | % | ∆% |
|---|---|---|---|---|
| BN | Wee Jeck Seng | 25,466 | 65.60 | +19.48 |
| PH | Karmaine Sardini | 10,380 | 26.74 | -20.55 |
| GERAKAN | Wendy Subramaniam | 1,707 | 4.40 | N/A |
| Pan-Malaysian Islamic Front | Badhrulhisham Abd Aziz | 850 | 2.19 | -4.40 |
| Independent | Ang Chuan Lock | 380 | 0.98 | N/A |
| Independent | Faridah Aryani Abd Ghaffar | 32 | 0.08 | N/A |
| Total valid votes | | 38,815 | 100.00 | |
| Total rejected ballots | | 595 | | |
| Unreturned ballots | | 30 | | |
| Turnout | | 39,435 | 74.43 | |
| Registered electors | | 52,986 | | |
| Majority | | 15,086 | 38.86 | |
| BN gain from PH | | Swing | | +20.02 |

=== Results according to polling districts ===
BN won all polling districts and post and early votes.

== Previous result ==
Malaysian general election, 2018: Tanjung Piai
| Party | Candidate | Votes | % | ∆% |
|---|---|---|---|---|
| PH | Md Farid Md Rafik | 21,255 | 47.29 | + 47.29 |
| BN | Wee Jeck Seng | 20,731 | 46.12 | 10.00 |
| PAS | Nordin Othman | 2,962 | 6.59 | + 6.59 |
| Total valid votes | | 44,948 | 100.00 | |
| Total rejected ballots | | 841 | | |
| Unreturned ballots | | 69 | | |
| Turnout | | 45,858 | 85.67 | |
| Registered electors | | 53,528 | | |
| Majority | | 524 | 1.17 | |
| PH gain from BN | | Swing | | ? |
Source(s) "His Majesty's Government Gazette - Notice of Contested Election, Parliament for the State of Johore [P.U. (B) 244/2018]" (PDF). Attorney General's Chambers of Malaysia. 3 May 2018. Archived from the original (PDF) on 29 December 2019. "Federal Government Gazette - Results of Contested Election and Statements of the Poll after the Official Addition of Votes, Parliamentary Constituencies for the State of Johore [P.U. (B) 318/2018]" (PDF). Attorney General's Chambers of Malaysia. 28 May 2018.

Note: Nordin Othman was a candidate of BERJASA, who had contested under the PAS banner through the Gagasan Sejahtera pact.

== Aftermath ==
BERSATU's heavy defeat in this by-election contributed heavily to Muhyiddin Yassin's decision to pull BERSATU out of Pakatan Harapan 3 months later in February 2020, leading to the Sheraton Move.

After the Sheraton Move, Wee Jeck Seng was appointed as Deputy Minister of Plantation Industries and Commodities I in both cabinets of Muhyiddin Yassin and Ismail Sabri Yaakob. He eventually successfully retained his parliamentary seat in the 2022 general election.
