= Tanjung Piai (federal constituency) =

Federal constituency in Johor, Malaysia

Tanjung Piai (P165)
Johor constituency

Federal constituency
- Legislature: Dewan Rakyat
- MP: Wee Jeck Seng; BN
- Constituency created: 2003
- First contested: 2004
- Last contested: 2022

Demographics
- Population (2020): 91,540
- Electors (2026): 72,524
- Area (km²): 486
- Pop. density (per km²): 188.4

Tanjung Piai (formerly Tanjong Piai) is a federal constituency in Pontian District and Johor Bahru District, Johor, Malaysia, that has been represented in the Dewan Rakyat since 2004.

The federal constituency was created in the 2003 redistribution and is mandated to elect a single member to the Dewan Rakyat under the first past the post voting system.

== Demographics ==
Ethnic breakdown of Tanjung Piai's electorate as of 2022
1. Malay (58.6%)
2. Chinese (40.2%)
3. Indian (1.00%)
4. Other ethnicities (0.30%)

As of 2020, Tanjung Piai has a population of 91,540 people.

Age breakdown of Tanjung Piai's electorate as of 2022
1. 18-20 (5.84%)
2. 21-29 (20.4%)
3. 30-39 (20.9%)
4. 40-49 (17.2%)
5. 50-59 (15.3%)
6. 60-69 (11.4%)
7. 70-79 (6.22%)
8. 80-89 (2.27%)
9. above 90 (0.54%)
Gender breakdown of Tanjung Piai's electorate as of 2022
1. Male (50.7%)
2. Female (49.3%)

== History ==
=== Polling districts ===
According to the gazette issued on 2 July 2026, the Tanjung Piai constituency has a total of 27 polling districts.

State constituency	Poling Districts	Code	Location
Pekan Nanas (N55)	Parit Kudus	165/55/01	SK Parit Kudus
Pekan Nanas (N55)	Tanjong Ayer Hitam	165/55/02	SK Tanjong Ayer Hitam
Pekan Nanas (N55)	Ladang South Malaya	165/55/03	SK Parit Haji Adnan
Pekan Nanas (N55)	Melayu Raya	165/55/04	SK Melayu Raya
Pekan Nanas (N55)	Kampong Lubok Sawah	165/55/05	SK Kampung Sawah
Pekan Nanas (N55)	Tenggayon	165/55/06	SK Seri Bunian
Pekan Nanas (N55)	Pengkalan Raja Pontian	165/55/07	SK Pengkalan Raja
Pekan Nanas (N55)	Bandar Pekan Nenas Barat	165/55/08	SMK Dato' Mohd. Yunos Sulaiman
Pekan Nanas (N55)	Bandar Pekan Nenas Timor	165/55/09	SMK Pekan Nanas
Pekan Nanas (N55)	Bandar Pekan Nenas Tengah	165/55/10	SK Pekan Nanas; SA Pekan Nanas
Pekan Nanas (N55)	Bandar Pekan Nenas Selatan	165/55/11	SJK (C) Yu Ming (1); SK Batu 24
Kukup (N56)	Ladang Sungai Burong	165/56/01	SK Jeram Batu
Kukup (N56)	Jalan Rimba Terjun	165/56/02	SJK (C) Bin Chong
Kukup (N56)	Kampong Duku	165/56/03	SJK (C) Cheow Min
Kukup (N56)	Kampong Rimba Terjun	165/56/04	SK Rimba Terjun
Kukup (N56)	Parit Hj. Ismail	165/56/05	SK Sungai Bunyi
Kukup (N56)	Rambah	165/56/06	SK Rambah
Kukup (N56)	Parit Rambai	165/56/07	SK Parit Rambai
Kukup (N56)	Peradin	165/56/08	SK Belokok
Kukup (N56)	Telok Kerang	165/56/09	SK Telok Kerang
Kukup (N56)	Penerok	165/56/10	SK Penerok
Kukup (N56)	Sungai Boh	165/56/11	SK Sungai Boh
Kukup (N56)	Bandar Permas Kechil	165/56/12	SJK (C) Pei Chiao
Kukup (N56)	Permas Kechil	165/56/13	SMK Sri Kukup
Kukup (N56)	Sungai Durian	165/56/14	SK Sungai Durian
Kukup (N56)	Serkat	165/56/15	SK Serkat
Kukup (N56)	Andek Mori	165/56/16	SK Andek Mori

=== Representation history ===
Members of Parliament for Tanjung Piai
Parliament	No	Years	Member	Party	Vote Share
Constituency created from Pontian
Tanjong Piai
11th	P165	2004–2008	Ong Ka Ting (黄家定)	BN (MCA)	28,046; 86.36%
12th	P165	2008–2013	Wee Jeck Seng (黄日昇)	BN (MCA)	23,392; 68.07%
13th	P165	2013–2018	Wee Jeck Seng (黄日昇)	BN (MCA)	25,038; 56.12%
Tanjung Piai
14th	P165	2018–2019	Mohamed Farid Md Rafik (محمد فريد بن مد رفيق)	PH (BERSATU)	21,255; 47.29%
14th	P165	2019–2022	Wee Jeck Seng (黄日昇)	BN (MCA)	25,466; 65.60%
15th	P165	2022–present	Wee Jeck Seng (黄日昇)	BN (MCA)	23,593; 43.22%

=== State constituency ===
Parliamentary constituency	State constituency						
Parliamentary constituency	1954–59*	1959–1974	1974–1986	1986–1995	1995–2004	2004–2018	2018–present
Tanjong Piai						Kukup	
Tanjong Piai						Pekan Nenas	
Tanjung Piai							Kukup
Tanjung Piai							Pekan Nanas

=== Historical boundaries ===
State Constituency	Area	
State Constituency	2003	2018
Kukup	Penerok; Rambah; Serkat; Taman Perindustrian Pekan Nanas; Tanjung Piai	Kukup; Penerok; Rambah; Serkat; Tanjung Piai
Pekan Nanas	Kampung Duku; Parit Mesjid; Pekan Nanas; Pengkalan Raja; Taman Saujana	Kampung Ulu Pulai; Parit Semerah; Pekan Nanas; Pengkalan Raja; Taman Perindustrian Pekan Nanas

=== Current state assembly members ===
No.	State Constituency	Member	Coalition (Party)
N55	Pekan Nanas	Tan Eng Meng	BN (MCA)
N56	Kukup	Md Israk Abdullah	BN (UMNO)

=== Local governments & postcode ===
No.	State Constituency	Local Government	Postcode
N55	Pekan Nanas	Iskandar Puteri City Council (Ulu Pulai area); Pontian Municipal Council	81500 Pekan Nanas; 82100 Ayer Baloi; 82300 Kukup
N56	Kukup	Pontian Municipal Council	81500 Pekan Nanas; 82100 Ayer Baloi; 82300 Kukup

== Election results ==
Malaysian general election, 2022
Party	Candidate	Votes	%	∆%
BN	Wee Jeck Seng	23,593	43.22	▼22.38
MUDA	Lim Wei Jiet	17,233	31.57	▲31.57
PN	Najwah Halimah Ab Alim	13,762	25.21	▲25.21
Total valid votes		54,588	100.00	
Total rejected ballots		395		
Unreturned ballots		123		
Turnout		55,106	77.23	▲2.80
Registered electors		70,679		
Majority		6,360	11.65	▼27.21
BN hold		Swing		
Source(s) https://lom.agc.gov.my/ilims/upload/portal/akta/outputp/1753254/PUB%20617%20PARLIMEN%20JOHOR.pdf

Malaysian general by-election, 2019 Upon the death of the incumbent, Mohamed Farid Md Rafik
Party	Candidate	Votes	%	∆%
BN	Wee Jeck Seng	25,466	65.60	▲19.48
PH	Karmaine Sardini	10,380	26.74	▲26.74
GERAKAN	Wendy Subramaniam	1,707	4.40	▲4.40
Pan-Malaysian Islamic Front	Badhrulhisham Abd Aziz	850	2.19	▼4.40
Independent	Ang Chuan Lock	380	0.98	▲0.98
Independent	Faridah Aryani Abd Ghaffar	32	0.08	▲0.08
Total valid votes		38,815	100.00	
Total rejected ballots		595		
Unreturned ballots		30		
Turnout		39,435	74.43	▼11.24
Registered electors		52,986		
Majority		15,086	38.86	▲37.69
BN gain from PKR		Swing		.

Malaysian general election, 2018
Party	Candidate	Votes	%	∆%
PKR	Mohamed Farid Md Rafik	21,255	47.29	▲47.29
BN	Wee Jeck Seng	20,731	46.12	▼10.00
PAS	Nordin Othman¹	2,962	6.59	▲6.59
Total valid votes		44,948	100.00	
Total rejected ballots		841		
Unreturned ballots		69		
Turnout		45,858	85.67	▼2.28
Registered electors		53,528		
Majority		524	1.17	▼11.07
PKR gain from BN		Swing		?
Source(s) "His Majesty's Government Gazette - Notice of Contested Election, Parliament for the State of Johore [P.U. (B) 244/2018]" (PDF). Attorney General's Chambers of Malaysia. 3 May 2018. Archived from the original (PDF) on 2019-12-29. "Federal Government Gazette - Results of Contested Election and Statements of the Poll after the Official Addition of Votes, Parliamentary Constituencies for the State of Johore [P.U. (B) 318/2018]" (PDF). Attorney General's Chambers of Malaysia. 28 May 2018.

Note: ^{1}Nordin Othman was a candidate of Pan-Malaysian Islamic Front (BERJASA), who had contested under the PAS banner through the Gagasan Sejahtera pact.

Malaysian general election, 2013: Tanjong Piai
Party	Candidate	Votes	%	∆%
BN	Wee Jeck Seng	25,038	56.12	▼11.95
DAP	Mahdzir Ibrahim	19,581	43.88	▲11.95
Total valid votes		44,619	100.00	
Total rejected ballots		918		
Unreturned ballots		85		
Turnout		45,622	87.95	▲10.13
Registered electors		51,875		
Majority		5,457	12.24	▼23.90
BN hold		Swing		
Source(s) "Federal Government Gazette - Notice of Contested Election, Parliament for the State of Johore [P.U. (B) 181/2013]" (PDF). Attorney General's Chambers of Malaysia. 26 April 2013. "Federal Government Gazette - Results of Contested Election and Statements of the Poll after the Official Addition of Votes, Parliamentary Constituencies for the State of Johore [P.U. (B) 222/2013]" (PDF). Attorney General's Chambers of Malaysia. 22 May 2013.

Malaysian general election, 2008: Tanjong Piai
Party	Candidate	Votes	%	∆%
BN	Wee Jeck Seng	23,302	68.07	▼18.29
DAP	Ahmad Ton	10,931	31.93	▲18.29
Total valid votes		34,233	100.00	
Total rejected ballots		1,117		
Unreturned ballots		214		
Turnout		35,564	77.82	▲1.68
Registered electors		45,701		
Majority		12,371	36.14	▼36.58
BN hold		Swing		

Malaysian general election, 2004: Tanjong Piai
Party	Candidate	Votes	%
BN	Ong Ka Ting	28,046	86.36
DAP	Tan Hang Meng	4,431	13.64
Total valid votes		32,477	100.00
Total rejected ballots		1,461	
Unreturned ballots		0	
Turnout		33,938	76.14
Registered electors		44,575	
Majority		23,615	72.72
This was a new constituency created.
