= Malaysian Chinese Association =

Malaysian political party

Malaysian Chinese Association Persatuan Cina Malaysia 马来西亚华人公会
- Malay name: Persatuan Cina Malaysia
- Chinese name: 马来西亚华人公会; Mǎláixīyà Huárén Gōnghuì
- Tamil name: மலேசிய சீனர் சங்கம் Malēciya Cīṉar Caṅkam
- Abbreviation: MCA / 马华
- President: Wee Ka Siong
- Secretary-General: Chong Sin Woon
- Deputy President: Mah Hang Soon
- Vice Presidents: Lim Ban Hong; Tan Teik Cheng; Wee Jeck Seng; Lawrence Low Ah Keong
- Women Chief: Wong You Fong
- Youth Chief: Ling Tian Soon
- Founder: Tan Cheng Lock
- Founded: 27 February 1949
- Preceded by: Malayan Chinese Association
- Headquarters: 8th Floor, Wisma MCA, 163, Jalan Ampang, 50450 Kuala Lumpur
- Newspaper: China Press; The Star; Nanyang Siang Pau; Sin Chew Daily
- Youth wing: MCA Youth Section
- Women's wing: Wanita MCA
- Ideology: Malaysian Chinese interests Social conservatism Three Principles of the People; Historical: Chinese nationalism
- Political position: Centre-right
- National affiliation: Barisan Nasional (since 1974) (Note: The party was member of the Alliance (1952–1973) and Gabungan Rakyat Sabah (2020–2022). Through BN it was aligned with United Alliance of Sabah (2018–2020) and Muafakat Nasional (2019–2020) and is aligned with Perikatan Nasional (2020–2022), Gabungan Parti Sarawak (since 2018) and Gabungan Rakyat Sabah (since 2020)); National Unity Government (since 2022)
- Colours: Blue and yellow
- Dewan Negara: 3 / 70
- Dewan Rakyat: 2 / 222
- Dewan Undangan Negeri: 14 / 612

Election symbol
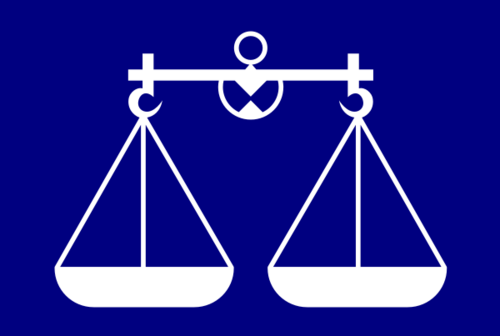

Party flag

Website
- www.mca.org.my

The Malaysian Chinese Association (Chinese: 马来西亚华人公会; Malay: Persatuan Cina Malaysia; abbr.: MCA/马华), formerly known as the Malayan Chinese Association, is a political party in Malaysia that seeks to represent the Malaysian Chinese community; it was one of the three original major component parties of the coalition party in Malaysia called the Alliance Party, which later became a broader coalition called Barisan Nasional.

The party was once the largest party representing the Chinese community in Malaysia, and was particularly dominant in the early period until the late 1960s. Its fortunes fluctuated after the establishment of other political parties in the 1960s that challenged it for the Chinese votes, although it still enjoyed significant support in the mid-1990s to mid-2000s period. However, it has performed poorly in elections since 2008, with the Malaysian Chinese community mostly voting for the Democratic Action Party and People's Justice Party, and in the 2018 Malaysian general election, it lost all but one of its parliamentary seats and was relegated to the opposition. It returned to power in March 2020 as part of the alliance with Perikatan Nasional. Since the 2022 election, the party has been part of the government backbench.

Through its holding of companies such as Huaren Holdings, MCA controls The Star, which is Malaysia's best-selling English newspaper.

== History ==
=== Formation and early years ===
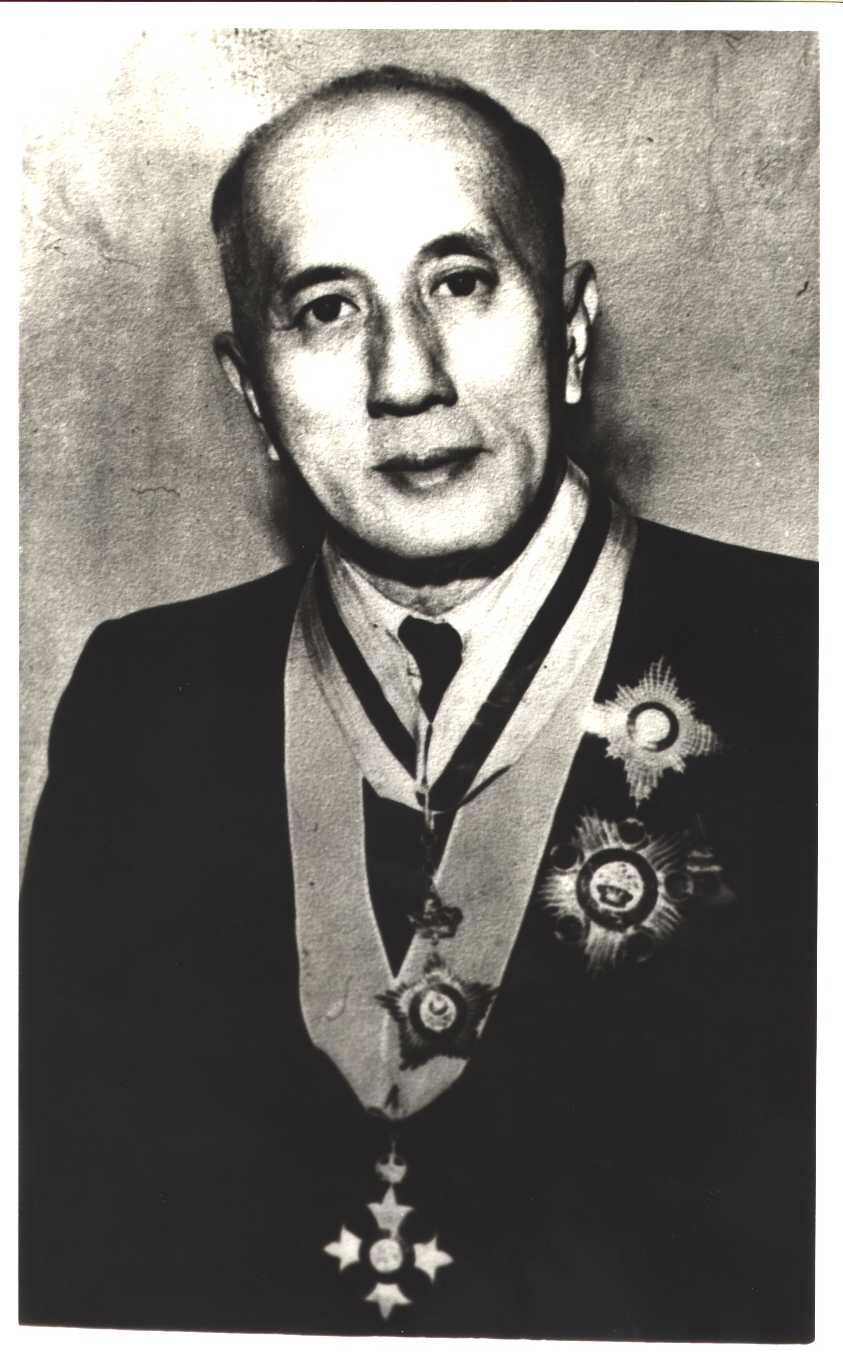
Tun Sir Tan Cheng Lock, first president of MCA

Malaysian Chinese Association
- Traditional Chinese: 馬來西亞華人公會
- Simplified Chinese: 马来西亚华人公会
Transcriptions
Standard Mandarin
- Hanyu Pinyin: Mǎláixīyà Huárén Gōnghuì
Yue: Cantonese
- Jyutping: maa5 loi4 sai1 aa3 waa4 jan4 gung1 wui2
Southern Min
- Hokkien POJ: Má-lâi-se-a Hoâ-jîn kong-hoē

The Malayan Chinese Association was formed on 27 February 1949 with the implicit support by the post-World War II British colonial administration. A central purpose of the MCA at the time of its founding was to manage the specific social and welfare concerns of the populations interned in the so-called New Villages created under the Briggs Plan in response to the Malayan Emergency.

The declaration that announced the MCA as a formal political party in 1951 was written by a prominent Straits Chinese businessman, Tan Cheng Lock, its first president. In general, its early members were landowners, businessmen, or otherwise better off, while the working classes in the New Villages overwhelmingly joined the Socialist Front instead. Many prominent members of the MCA were also Kuomintang members opposed to the Malayan Communist Party. Leong Yew Koh, was a KMT major general who became a cabinet minister and later became governor of Malacca; Malaysia's first minister of finance, Henry H.S. Lee, was a KMT colonel; and Lim Chong Eu, the leader of the Radical Party and joined the MCA in 1952, was a colonel (medical) doctor in the Kuomintang.

In 1952, MCA joined force with the United Malays National Organisation on a local level to contest the Kuala Lumpur municipal elections which would lead to the formation of the Alliance Party. The alliance was joined by Malaysian Indian Congress in 1954 and they contested the first Malayan General Election in 1955 as one body, and the alliance won 51 of the 52 seat contested. MCA won all 15 of the seats allocated.

Tan Cheng Lock was succeeded by Lim Chong Eu after a successful challenge by Lim for the presidency in 1958. Lim attempted to amend the party's Constitution to consolidate the power of the Central Committee, and although amendment was passed narrowly, it also split the party. Prior to the 1959 General Election, Lim pressed for an increase of the allocated number of seats from 28 to 40, but this was refused by UMNO leader Tunku Abdul Rahman. Lim was forced to back down and later resigned as president, with Cheah Toon Lock taking over as acting president. Other members also resigned from MCA to contest the election as independent candidates, which cost the party some seats. The party only won 19 of the 31 seats eventually allocated. Lim himself left the party in December 1960, later becoming one of the founding members of the opposition Gerakan in 1968. In 1961 Tan Siew Sin, son of Tan Cheng Lock and favoured by Tunku, became MCA's third President. Tan led the party to a firm victory in the 1964 General Election, winning 27 of the 33 parliamentary seats contested. In 1969, Tan established Tunku Abdul Rahman College after a proposal for a Chinese-language university was turned down by the government.

=== 1969–1985 ===
The third Malaysian general elections were held on 10 May 1969. MCA faced strong challenges from the new, mainly Chinese, opposition parties Democratic Action Party and Gerakan. Of the 33 parliamentary seats contested, MCA managed to retain only 13. MCA also lost control of the Penang State Government to Gerakan. The gain by the opposition parties led to tension between different communities which erupted into the May 13 Riots. Prior to the riots, on 12 May 1969, Tan Siew Sin announced that the party would withdraw from the Alliance, but reconsidered on 20 May and joined the National Operations Council formed in place of the suspended Parliament after the riots. The loss of support for MCA among the Chinese population elicited a comment by the then Deputy Prime Minister Dr Ismail that if MCA continue to lose support, UMNO may stop co-operating with it. To regain Chinese support, Tan attempted to broaden the appeal of the party previously seen as a party of the taukeh (tou jia, rich men), and invited professionals to join the party. However, many of these were later expelled after a dispute involving Lim Keng Yaik who then joined Gerakan.

With the loss of support for MCA in the 1969 election, and the enlargement of the Alliance party in 1972 (which later became Barisan Nasional) to include Gerakan, UMNO became even more dominant and MCA suffered a loss of status within the coalition. In 1973, Tan Siew Sin requested a position as Deputy Prime Minister in the cabinet reshuffle following the death of Tun Dr. Ismail, but this was refused by Tun Abdul Razak, which angered Tan. On 8 April 1974, prior to the general election, Tan Siew Sin resigned all of his party and government posts for health reasons.

Lee San Choon took over as Acting President following Tan's resignation, and was then elected president in 1975. After Tan's resignation, the cabinet posts allocated to MCA declined in importance, and MCA lost both the Finance Ministry and Trade and Industry Ministry posts it once held in 1957. The party performed better in the 1974 election, but lost ground again in the following 1978 general election, with the MCA winning only 17 of the 28 parliamentary seats and 44 of the 60 state seats. In 1979, Michael Chen stood against Lee San Choon for the MCA Presidency but lost, and later in 1981 led a group of MCA dissidents to join Gerakan.

The 1982 general election however saw a shift in fortune for MCA. Lee accepted a challenge from the opposition Democratic Action Party which taunted the MCA's leadership for not daring to contest a seat with large urban Chinese majority, and contested the parliamentary seat for Seremban against the incumbent DAP Chairman Chen Man Hin. Lee won his challenge, and led his party to a resounding victory, winning 24 out of 28 allocated parliamentary seats and 55 out of 62 state seats. After the success in the election and at the height of his career, Lee San Choon unexpectedly resigned his presidency and cabinet post for unspecified reason in 1983. Neo Yee Pan then led as Acting President until 1985.

=== 1985–2003 ===
In 1985, Tan Koon Swan, who was sacked from the party a year earlier, won the presidential election with the largest majority in the party's history. However, in the following year, he was charged with abetting criminal breach of trust relating to his private business dealings in Singapore, and resigned from the presidency. Koon Swan also originated the Deposit-Taking Cooperatives, which sought to accumulate capital for Chinese Malaysians through investments. The mismanagement of the DTCs' funds led to a scandal, with the central bank, Bank Negara Malaysia, stepping in to freeze the assets of up to 35 DTCs. The total loss was estimated to be RM3.6 billion, and depositors could only recover 62% of their deposits.

Koon Swan was succeeded by his deputy Ling Liong Sik in 1986. He assumed the presidency when the party was still rife with factionalism and faced disillusionment with the Chinese community over the Deposit-Taking Cooperatives scandal. Ling spent his early years as president working to resolve MCA's financial problems, raising funds while restructuring the party's assets. Ling presided over a period of relative peace within the party, and worked to maintain the interests of the Chinese community through a closed-door approach within the government. He expanded the MCA-owned Tunku Abdul Rahman College through fund-raising and government contributions, and in 2001 set up Universiti Tunku Abdul Rahman. Ling led MCA to its best electoral performance thus far in the 1995 general election, winning 30 of the 34 allocated parliamentary seats and 71 of the 77 state seats, and secured a majority of Chinese votes at the expense of DAP. MCA also performed well in the 1999 general elections, and the successive electoral victory boosted the party's standing within the Barisan Nasional coalition as well as Ling's personal relationship with BN leader and prime minister Mahathir Mohamad.

However, internal power struggles persisted. In 1993 Ling's deputy Lee Kim Sai indicated that he would challenge Ling for the presidency, but withdrew at the eleventh hour. Lee eventually retired in 1996 and was replaced as deputy president by Lim Ah Lek. In 1999, the party was again wracked by factionalism. Deputy president Lim Ah Lek announced his intention to retire as a minister and agreed with Ling to nominate his protégé Chan Kong Choy to the Cabinet after the 1999 elections. However, Ling nominated his own protégé Ong Ka Ting as a minister at the expense of Chan, causing discontent with members aligned to Lim, which became known as "Team B" among party members. The Ling faction was known as "Team A". Tensions flared further after MCA, through its holding company Huaren, moved to acquire the independent daily Nanyang Siang Pau. This was vehemently opposed by Team B, fearing a complete control of the Chinese media by Team A. They were joined by Chinese journalists and non-governmental organisations, who made their opposition public through demonstrations. The situation turned farcical when chairs were thrown during the 2001 Youth general assembly over the issue. Huaren eventually succeeded in taking over Nanyang Siang Pau. Huaren also controls The Star and China Press, and the domination of media press resulted in strong resentments in the divided party and concerns over press freedom.

Mahathir, as BN leader, eventually stepped in to resolve the conflict, suggesting a "peace plan" among the factions. The scheduled 2002 party elections were cancelled, while Ling and Lim stepped down to be replaced by their respective protégés.

=== 2003–2008 ===
In May 2003, the leadership transition occurred as planned. Ong Ka Ting, who was then a vice-president succeeded Ling Liong Sik as president, while Chan Kong Choy succeeded Lim Ah Lek as deputy president. The Ong-led MCA contributed to Barisan Nasional's overwhelming victory in the 2004 general elections. MCA won 31 of the 40 parliamentary seats and 76 of the 90 state seats allocated. During the 2005 party elections, Teams A and B ran on a united front, easily quashing the challenge by vice-president Chua Jui Meng (for president) and secretary-general Ting Chew Peh (for deputy president).

The Ong-Chan leadership continued the soft approach to protecting the Chinese community's interests, although tension with UMNO over racial issues flared up now and again after the 2004 election. In early 2008, vice-president and Health Minister Chua Soi Lek, a prominent Johor member, was involved in a sex scandal. DVDs of Chua having sex with a woman were circulated in Johor, prompting Chua to resign all his political positions, including as Member of Parliament. Chua suggested that his political enemies within the party who might have felt threatened by him for plotting his downfall.

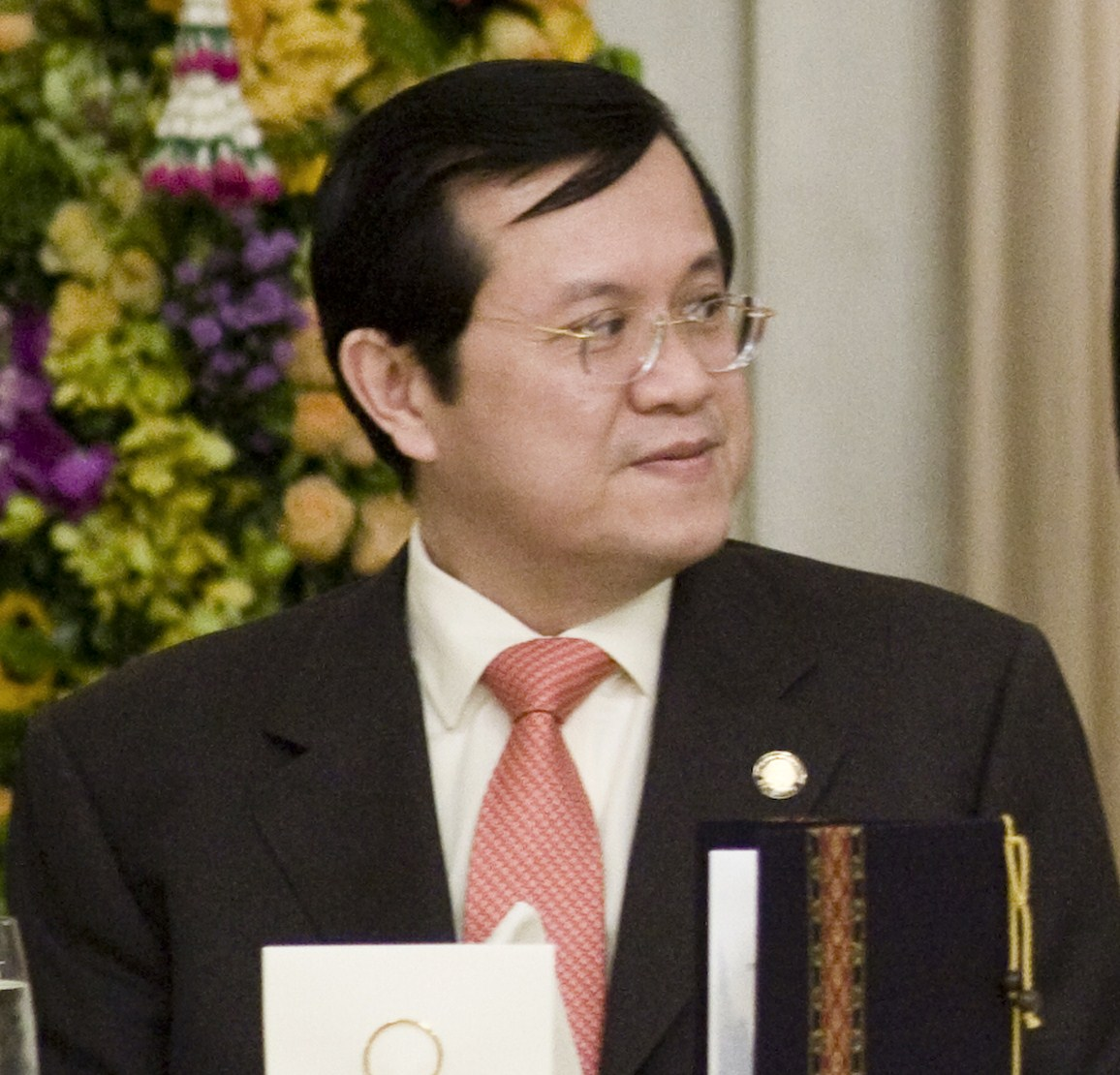
Ong Tee Keat, president 2008–2010

In the March 2008 general elections, MCA fared badly, winning only 15 parliamentary seats and 32 state seats, less than half the number of seats they won in the previous election. Ong decided not to contest the presidency during the party elections later that year, to allow a new leader to take over. The October 2008 party election marked a realignment of the party's factions, with the return of Chua Soi Lek to the fold. Ong Ka Ting's anointed successor was vice-president Ong Tee Keat. Meanwhile, Chua entered the race for deputy president, facing among others, Ong Ka Chuan, the elder brother of Ka Ting. Ong Tee Keat won the presidency comfortably, while Chua edged out Ka Chuan. Following his victory, Tee Keat pledged reform and reaching out to more young voters to revive the party.

=== 2008–present ===
After the 2008 leadership change, factional infighting continued and the relationship between Ong Tee Keat and Chua Soi Lek remained tense. Chua was sidelined by Ong from taking an active role in the party's leadership, and he was also excluded from government posts. He was then sacked by MCA in August 2009 for damaging the party's image with his sex scandal more than a year prior. In response, Chua's supporters forced an extraordinary general meeting which passed a vote of no confidence against incumbent president Ong and annulled the expulsion of Chua. The EGM, however, failed to reinstate Chua as deputy president. Ong refused to resign despite the vote of no confidence, but pledged with Chua to set aside their differences under the "greater unity plan." However, this was opposed by vice-president Liow Tiong Lai who demanded Ong step down and that new elections be held. This set in motion a new leadership crisis, which lasted almost six months.

Finally in March 2010, Chua, along with his supporters in the central committee resigned. Along with the resignations of Liow's supporters in the CC, more than two-thirds of the CC had vacated their seats, paving the way for an election per the party constitution. The subsequent election saw Chua defeating incumbent Ong Tee Keat and former leader Ong Ka Ting in the race for president, while Liow defeated Kong Cho Ha in the contest for deputy president. Chua and his deputy Liow pledged to co-operate, and opened the party to non-Chinese.

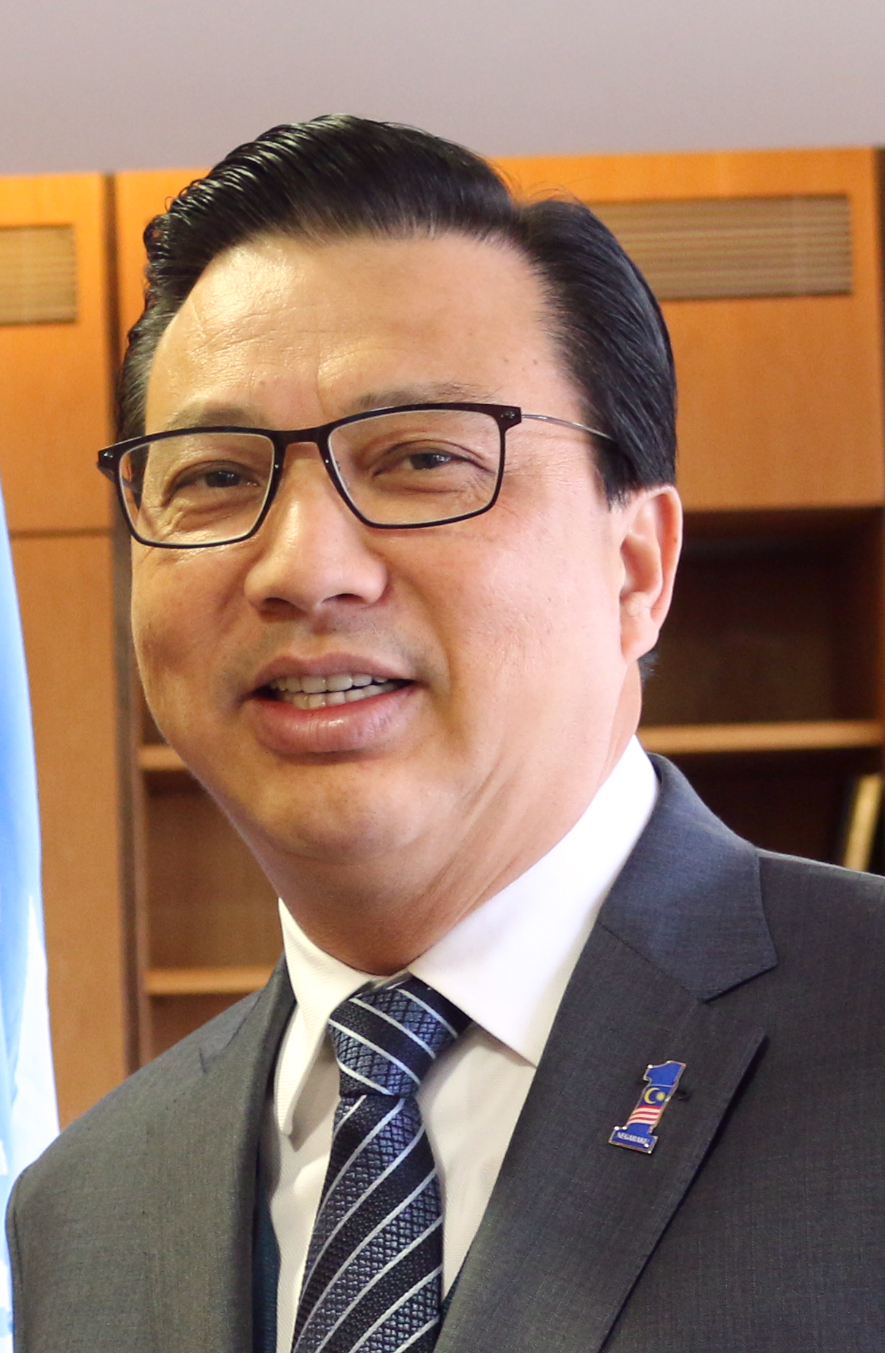
Liow Tiong Lai, president 2013–2018

MCA's electoral performance meanwhile continued to deteriorate, as in the 2013 General Election, MCA managed to score only 7 of the 37 parliamentary seats and 11 of the 90 state seats it contested, leading to calls for Chua's resignation. The so-called "Chinese tsunami" where the great majority of Chinese votes went to the opposition was blamed by Najib Razak for the losses of the governing coalition. MCA's poor performance in the two elections, along with continued factionalism, raised concerns over the party's relevance in the Malaysian political arena. Also as a result of its poor performance, there was no MCA representation in the cabinet for the first time since independence due to a resolution that MCA would not accept cabinet posts if it performed badly in the general election.

Chua did not enter the following party poll for president, and in December 2013, Liow Tiong Lai was elected the president of MCA. Liow also reversed the resolution not to serve in the government and re-entered the cabinet.

In the 2018 election, MCA suffered its worst ever defeat, as it has lost all state seats it has contested, and only managed to retain one elected representative in the national parliament - Wee Ka Siong, who represents Ayer Hitam constituency in Johor. MCA, as part of the Barisan Nasional coalition, was also relegated to the opposition for the first time since independence. Wee Ka Siong was elected president on 4 November 2018 while Liow decided not to stand for party polls after his defeat. MCA later regained a seat in the 2019 Tanjung Piai by-election.

In March 2020, MCA returned to power as part of Barisan Nasional aligned to the Perikatan Nasional coalition after the collapse of the Pakatan Harapan government.

==== 1MDB scandal ====
On 8 July 2020, a sum of RM835,258.19 seized by the Malaysian Anti-Corruption Commission (MACC) from Pahang MCA for allegedly being linked to the 1Malaysia Development Berhad (1MDB) fund scandal, has been forfeited to the Malaysian government.

MCA and SUPP attended video conference of the CPC and World Political Parties Summit organised by the Chinese Communist Party in 2021.

In the 2022 election, Pakatan Harapan won the most seats but not the majority, and returned to government with the support of Barisan Nasional. MCA won two seats, however, it was not given any government cabinet posts and it stayed as a backbencher of the government.

== Organisational structure ==
=== Central Committee ===
Incumbent leadership of MCA was elected by general assembly delegates in the 2023 Malaysian Chinese Association leadership election.

Position	Incumbent	State	Division
President	Wee Ka Siong	Johor	Johor Bahru (Note: Member of Parliament for Ayer Hitam, involved in Johor Bahru Division)
Deputy President	Mah Hang Soon	Perak	Tapah
Secretary-General	Chong Sin Woon	Negeri Sembilan	Seremban
Vice Presidents	Wee Jeck Seng	Johor	Tanjung Piai
Vice Presidents	Lim Ban Hong	Melaka	Tangga Batu
Vice Presidents	Lawrence Low Ah Keong	Selangor	Kota Raja
Vice Presidents	Tan Teik Cheng	Penang	Bukit Mertajam
Vice Presidents	Ling Tian Soon	Johor	Ayer Hitam
Vice Presidents	Wong You Fong	Johor	Pulai
Youth Chief	Ling Tian Soon	Johor	Ayer Hitam
Women Chief	Wong You Fong	Johor	Pulai
Treasurer-General	Tan Tuan Peng	Johor	Pasir Gudang
National Organising Secretary	Leaw Kok Chan	Negeri Sembilan	Seremban
Deputy Secretary-General	Pamela Yong	Sabah	Kota Kinabalu
Deputy Treasurer-General	Adrian Lee Yin Chung	Sabah	Kinabatangan
Deputy National Organising Secretary	Kang Meng Fuat	Pahang	Bentong
Central Committee Members (elected)	Koh Nai Kwong	Malacca	Alor Gajah
Central Committee Members (elected)	Chua Hock Kuan	Kelantan	Kota Bharu
Central Committee Members (elected)	Monna Ong Siew Siew	Terengganu	Marang
Central Committee Members (elected)	Chris Lee Ching Yong	Johor	Bakri
Central Committee Members (elected)	Tan Chong	Johor	Labis
Central Committee Members (elected)	Tan Kok Eng	Federal Territory	Kepong
Central Committee Members (elected)	Leong Kok Wee	Selangor	Pandan
Central Committee Members (elected)	Chan Quin Er	Federal Territory	Seputeh
Central Committee Members (elected)	Ooi Jing Ting	Perak	Beruas
Central Committee Members (elected)	Choong Shin Heng	Perak	Tapah
Central Committee Members (elected)	Quek Tai Seong	Pahang	Indera Mahkota
Central Committee Members (elected)	Lee Ban Seng	Selangor	Hulu Langat
Central Committee Members (elected)	Koh Chin Han	Malacca	Jasin
Central Committee Members (elected)	Lu Yen Tung	Sabah	Sepanggar
Central Committee Members (elected)	Lee Ting Han	Johor	Johor Bahru
Central Committee Members (elected)	Cally Ting Zhao Song	Perak	Gopeng
Central Committee Members (elected)	Tan Gim Tuan	Selangor	Damansara
Central Committee Members (elected)	Lawrence Chiew Kai Heng	Selangor	Subang
Central Committee Members (elected)	Saw Yee Fung	Pahang	Raub
Central Committee Members (elected)	Chin Tung Leong	Kedah	Padang Serai
Central Committee Members (elected)	Chua Thiong Gee	Kedah	Sungai Petani
Central Committee Members (elected)	Woon Yong Teai	Kedah	Kubang Pasu
Central Committee Members (elected)	Wong Tat Chee	Pahang	Temerloh
Central Committee Members (appointed)	Pamela Yong	Sabah	Kota Kinabalu
Central Committee Members (appointed)	Nicole Wong Siaw Ting	Federal Territory	Seputeh
Central Committee Members (appointed)	Mike Chong Yew Chuan	Federal Territory	Wangsa Maju
Central Committee Members (appointed)	Tee Hooi Ling	Selangor	Klang

=== State Liaison Committees Leadership ===
On 31 October 2023, President MCA had announced lists of State Liaison Committees chairpersons.

State	Chairperson	Youth Chief	Women Chief
Johor	Wee Ka Siong	Heng Zhi Li	Wong You Fong
Kedah	Chua Thiong Gee		
Kelantan	Chua Hock Kuan		
Malacca	Lim Ban Hong		
Negeri Sembilan	Leaw Kok Chan	Siow Kong Choon	
Pahang	Chong Sin Woon		
Penang	Tan Teik Cheng		
Perak	Mah Hang Soon		
Perlis	Chuah Tian Hee		
Selangor	Lawrence Low Ah Keong	Tan Jie Sen	Tee Hooi Ling
Terengganu	Monna Ong Siew Siew		
Sabah	Teah Heok Kuin		Pamela Yong
Federal Territory	Wee Jeck Seng	Mike Chong Yew Chuan	

== Leadership ==
=== Presidents of the Malayan Chinese Association ===
Order	Name	Term of office		Elected
1	Tan Cheng Lock	27 February 1949	27 March 1958	
2	Lim Chong Eu	27 March 1958	July 1959	
–	Cheah Toon Lok	July 1959	November 1961	acting
3	Tan Siew Sin	November 1961	16 September 1963	

=== Presidents of the Malaysian Chinese Association ===
Order	Name	Term of office		Elected
3	Tan Siew Sin	16 September 1963	8 April 1974	
–	Lee San Choon	8 April 1974	August 1975	acting
4	Lee San Choon	August 1975	August 1979	
4	Lee San Choon	August 1979	25 March 1983	
–	Neo Yee Pan	March 1983	24 November 1985	acting
5	Tan Koon Swan	24 November 1985	September 1986	
6	Ling Liong Sik	3 September 1986	23 May 2003	
7	Ong Ka Ting	23 May 2003	18 October 2008	
8	Ong Tee Keat	18 October 2008	28 March 2010	
9	Chua Soi Lek	28 March 2010	21 December 2013	
10	Liow Tiong Lai	21 December 2013	4 November 2018	
11	Wee Ka Siong	4 November 2018	Incumbent	

== Elected representatives ==
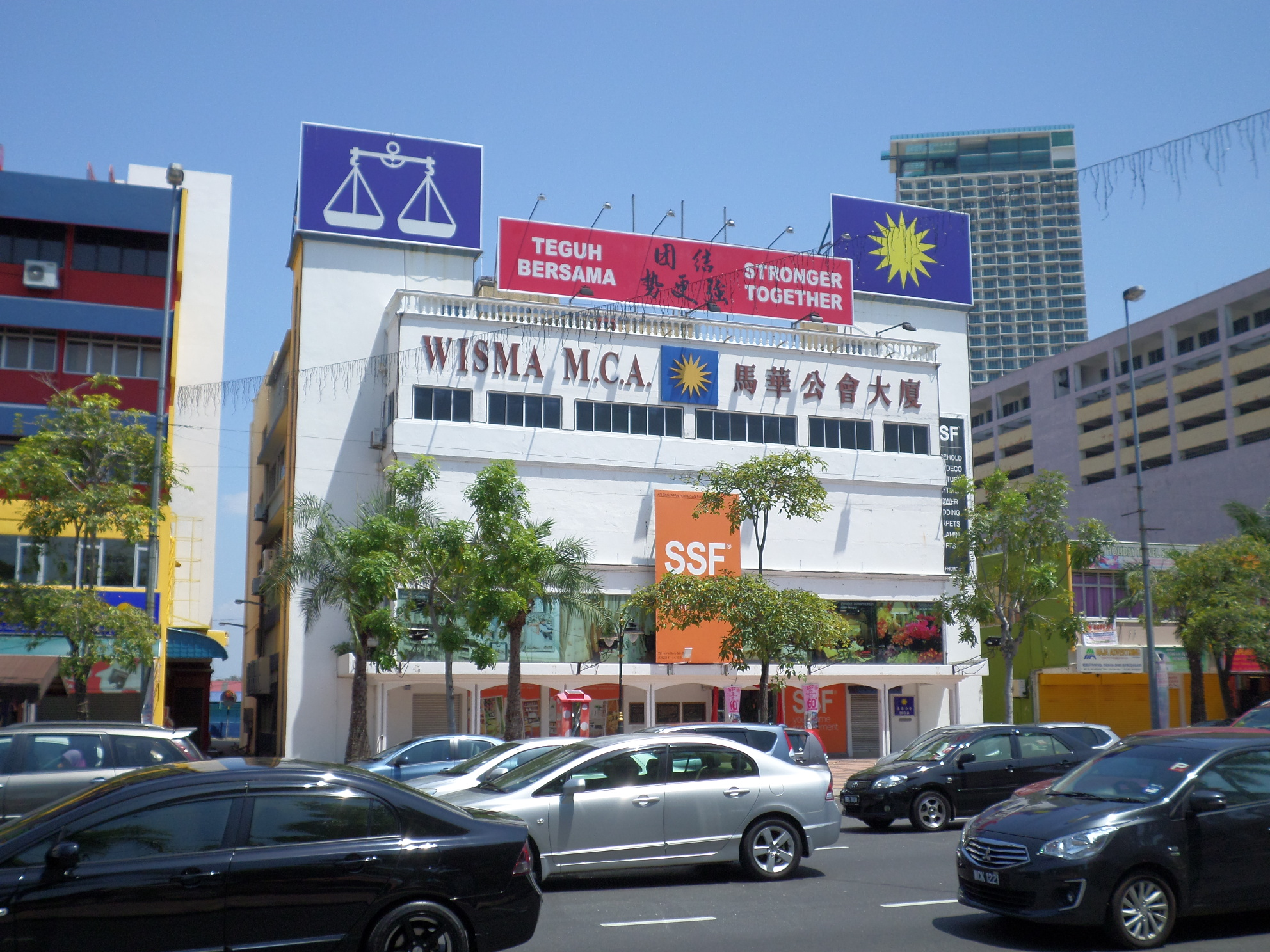
MCA Malacca branch office

=== Dewan Negara (Senate) ===
==== Senators ====
- His Majesty's appointee:
  - Wong You Fong
- Malacca State Legislative Assembly:
  - Koh Nai Kwong
- Johor State Legislative Assembly:
  - Ng Keng Heng

=== Dewan Rakyat (House of Representatives) ===
==== Members of Parliament of the 15th Malaysian Parliament ====
MCA currently has two MPs in the House of Representatives.

State	No.	Parliament Constituency	Member	Party
Johor	P148	Ayer Hitam	Wee Ka Siong	MCA
Johor	P165	Tanjung Piai	Wee Jeck Seng	MCA
Total	Johor (2)			

=== Dewan Undangan Negeri (State Legislative Assembly) ===
==== Malaysian State Assembly Representatives ====
Johor State Legislative Assembly
8 / 56
Negeri Sembilan State Legislative Assembly
2 / 36
Malacca State Legislative Assembly
2 / 28
Perak State Legislative Assembly
1 / 59
Pahang State Legislative Assembly
1 / 47
Kedah State Legislative Assembly
0 / 36
Terengganu State Legislative Assembly
0 / 33
Penang State Legislative Assembly
0 / 40
Kelantan State Legislative Assembly
0 / 45
Selangor State Legislative Assembly
0 / 56
Perlis State Legislative Assembly
0 / 15
Sabah State Legislative Assembly
0 / 79
Sarawak State Legislative Assembly
0 / 82

State	No.	Federal Constituency	No.	State Constituency	Member	Party
Perak	P072	Tapah	N47	Chenderiang	Choong Shin Heng	MCA
Pahang	—			Nominated Member	Wong Tat Chee	MCA
Negeri Sembilan	P126	Jelebu	N01	Chennah	Siow Kong Choon	MCA
Negeri Sembilan	P133	Tampin	N36	Repah	Koh Kim Swee	MCA
Malacca	P135	Alor Gajah	N08	Machap Jaya	Ngwe Hee Sem	MCA
Malacca	P136	Tangga Batu	N14	Kelebang	Lim Ban Hong	MCA
Johor	P140	Segamat	N02	Jementah	See Ann Giap	MCA
Johor	P142	Labis	N06	Bekok	Tan Chong	MCA
Johor	P144	Ledang	N10	Tangkak	Haw Chin Teck	MCA
Johor	P148	Ayer Hitam	N19	Yong Peng	Ling Tian Soon	MCA
Johor	P151	Simpang Renggam	N27	Layang-Layang	Chua Jian Boon	MCA
Johor	P153	Sembrong	N30	Paloh	Lee Ting Han	MCA
Johor	P159	Pasir Gudang	N42	Johor Jaya	Chan San San	MCA
Johor	P165	Tanjung Piai	N55	Pekan Nanas	Tan Eng Meng	MCA
Total	Perak (1), Pahang (1), Negeri Sembilan (2), Malacca (2), Johor (8)					

== Government offices ==
=== State governments ===
MCA serves a junior partner role in Barisan Nasional and Alliance, having led Alliance only in Penang state government before 1969

- Pahang (1957–1978, 1982–2022, 2024–present)
- Johor (1957–2018, 2022–present)
- Malacca (1957–2018, 2021–present)
- Penang (1957–1969, 1974–1990, 1995–2008)
- Perlis (1959–2022)
- Perak (1957–2008, 2009–2018, 2022–present)
- Kedah (1957–2008, 2013–2018)
- Negeri Sembilan (1957–2013, 2026–present)
- Terengganu (1957–1999, 1995–1999, 2004–2013)
- Selangor (1957–2008)
- Sabah (1994–1999, 2004–2013, 2015–2018)
- Kelantan (1957–1959, 1970–1978, 1978–1990)

Note: bold as Menteri Besar/Chief Minister, italic as junior partner

== Election results ==
=== General election results ===
Election	Total seats won	Seats contested	Total votes	Share of votes	Outcome of election	Election leader
1955	15 / 52	15	201,212	20.09%	▲15 seats; Governing coalition (Alliance Party)	Tan Cheng Lock
1959	19 / 104	30	232,073	15.00%	▲4 seats; Governing coalition (Alliance Party)	Lim Chong Eu
1964	27 / 104	30	225,211	18.7%	▲8 seats; Governing coalition (Alliance Party)	Tan Siew Sin
1969	13 / 144	30		13.50%	▼15 seats; Governing coalition (Alliance Party)	Tan Siew Sin
1974	19 / 144	30			▲6 seats; Governing coalition (Barisan Nasional)	Lee San Choon
1978	17 / 154	32			▼2 seats; Governing coalition (Barisan Nasional)	Lee San Choon
1982	24 / 154	32			▲7 seats; Governing coalition (Barisan Nasional)	Lee San Choon
1986	17 / 177	28	589,289	12.42%	▼7 seats; Governing coalition (Barisan Nasional)	Ling Liong Sik
1990	18 / 180	32			▲1 seat; Governing coalition (Barisan Nasional)	Ling Liong Sik
1995	30 / 192	30			▲12 seats; Governing coalition (Barisan Nasional)	Ling Liong Sik
1999	28 / 193	30			▼2 seats; Governing coalition (Barisan Nasional)	Ling Liong Sik
2004	31 / 219	33	1,074,230	15.5%	▲3 seats; Governing coalition (Barisan Nasional)	Ong Ka Ting
2008	15 / 222	33	840,489	10.35%	▼16 seats; Governing coalition (Barisan Nasional)	Ong Ka Ting
2013	7 / 222	39	867,851	7.86%	▼8 seats; Governing coalition (Barisan Nasional)	Chua Soi Lek
2018	1 / 222	40	639,165	5.30%	▼6 seats; Opposition coalition, later Governing coalition (Barisan Nasional)	Liow Tiong Lai
2022	2 / 222	44	665,436	4.29%	▲1 seat; Governing coalition (Barisan Nasional)	Wee Ka Siong

=== State election results ===
State assembly	Election	Votes	%	Seats	Won/contested	+/–	Position	Status
Perlis	2022	3,698	2.5	0 / 15	0 / 2	▼1	▼3rd (Barisan Nasional)	No seats
Kedah	2023	Did not participate						No seats
Kelantan	2023	Did not participate						No seats
Terengganu	2023	Did not participate						No seats
Penang	2023	Did not participate						No seats
Perak	2022	68,510	4.6	1 / 59	1 / 17	▲1	▼3rd (Barisan Nasional)	BN–PH
Pahang	2022	38,322	4.4	0 / 42	0 / 7	▼1	▼2nd (Barisan Nasional)	BN–PH (Note: Appointed state assemblyman.)
Selangor	2023	Did not participate						No seats
Negeri Sembilan	2026	44,432	6.7	2 / 36	2 / 7	▲2	▲1st (Barisan Nasional)	BN–PN
Malacca	2026	26,468	5.4	2 / 28	2 / 4	Steady	1st (Barisan Nasional)	BN–PN
Johor	2026	274,786	14.7	8 / 56	8 / 15	▲4	1st (Barisan Nasional)	BN
Sabah	2025	3,752	0.3	0 / 73	0 / 2	Steady	▲3rd (Barisan Nasional)	No seats

State election	State Legislative Assembly													
State election	Perlis	Kedah	Kelantan	Terengganu	Penang	Perak	Pahang	Selangor	Negeri Sembilan	Malacca	Johor	Sabah	Singapore (until 1965)	Total won / Total contested
2/3 majority	2 / 3	2 / 3	2 / 3	2 / 3	2 / 3	2 / 3	2 / 3	2 / 3	2 / 3	2 / 3	2 / 3	2 / 3	2 / 3	
1954											5 / 16			5 / 16
1955		3 / 12	1 / 16						2 / 12	3 / 8			1 / 25	10 / 73
1959	2 / 12	5 / 24	1 / 30	2 / 24	6 / 24	9 / 40	6 / 24	8 / 28	7 / 24	7 / 20	7 / 32		0 / 51	
1964	2 / 12	5 / 24	1 / 30	1 / 24	6 / 24	12 / 40	7 / 24	8 / 28	9 / 24	4 / 20	11 / 32			
1969	2 / 12	2 / 24	1 / 30	1 / 24	0 / 24	1 / 40	4 / 24	1 / 28	4 / 24	4 / 20	10 / 32			
1974	2 / 12	2 / 26	1 / 36	2 / 26	1 / 27	3 / 42	7 / 32	6 / 33	5 / 24	3 / 20	10 / 32			
1978	2 / 12	4 / 26	1 / 36	1 / 28	2 / 27	4 / 42	0 / 32	5 / 33	5 / 24	3 / 20	10 / 32			
1982	2 / 12	3 / 26	1 / 36	1 / 28	6 / 27	10 / 42	5 / 32	7 / 33	6 / 24	5 / 20	10 / 32			
1986	2 / 14	3 / 28	1 / 39	1 / 32	2 / 33	3 / 46	5 / 33	8 / 42	4 / 28	4 / 20	10 / 36			
1990	2 / 14	4 / 28	0 / 39	0 / 32	0 / 33	3 / 46	4 / 33	6 / 42	4 / 28	4 / 20	8 / 36	0 / 48		
1995	2 / 15	4 / 36	1 / 45	1 / 32	9 / 40	13 / 59	7 / 42	11 / 56	7 / 36	5 / 28	11 / 56			
1999	2 / 15	4 / 36	0 / 45	0 / 32	9 / 40	12 / 59	7 / 42	11 / 56	9 / 36	4 / 28	11 / 56	0 / 60		
2004	2 / 15	4 / 36	0 / 45	1 / 32	9 / 40	10 / 59	8 / 42	12 / 56	8 / 36	6 / 28	15 / 56	1 / 60		
2008	2 / 15	1 / 36	0 / 45	1 / 32	0 / 40	1 / 59	6 / 42	2 / 56	1 / 36	4 / 28	12 / 56	1 / 60		
2013	1 / 15	2 / 36	0 / 45	0 / 32	0 / 40	1 / 59	2 / 42	0 / 56	0 / 36	3 / 28	2 / 56	0 / 60		11 / 90
2018	1 / 15	0 / 36	0 / 45	0 / 32	0 / 40	0 / 59	1 / 42	0 / 56	0 / 36	0 / 28	0 / 56	0 / 60		2 / 90
2020												0 / 73		0 / 4
2021										2 / 28				2 / 7
2022											4 / 56			4 / 15
2022	0 / 15					1 / 59	0 / 42							1 / 26
2025												0 / 73		0 / 2
2026									2 / 36	2 / 28	8 / 56			12 / 26

== See also ==
- List of political parties in Malaysia
- Politics of Malaysia
- Kuomintang

== Notes ==
- James Chin (2016). “From K etuanan Melayu to Ketuanan Islam: UMNO and the Malaysian Chinese” in Bridget Welsh (ed.) The End of UMNO? Essays on Malaysia's Dominant Party (Strategic Information and Research Development Centre: Selangor, Malaysia) pp 226–273
- James Chin. Malaysian Chinese Association (MCA) Politics a Year Later: Crisis of Political Legitimacy, The Round Table: The Commonwealth Journal of International Affairs Vol. 99, No. 407, April 2010, pp. 153–162
- James Chin. The Malaysian Chinese Dilemma: The Never Ending Policy (NEP), Chinese Southern Diaspora Studies, Vol 3, 2009
- Chin, James (2006). "New Chinese Leadership in Malaysia: The Contest for the MCA and Gerakan Presidency". Contemporary Southeast Asia (CSEA), Vol. 28, No. 1 (April 2006).
- Chin, James (2000). "A New Balance: The Chinese Vote in the 1999 Malaysian General Election". South East Asia Research 8 (3), 281–299.
- Chin, James (2001). "Malaysian Chinese Politics in the 21st Century: Fear, Service and Marginalisation". Asian Journal of Political Science 9 (2), 78–94.
- James Chin (2018) The Malaysian Chinese Association, set adrift in need of a direction, Channel News Asia, 30 October
- Goh, Cheng Teik (1994). Malaysia: Beyond Communal Politics. Pelanduk Publications. ISBN 967-978-475-4.
- "National Front parties were not formed to fight for Malaysian independence". Malaysia Today. by Pillai, M.G.G. (3 November 2005)
