= Wee Jeck Seng =

Malaysian politician

Yang Berhormat Dato' Sri Wee Jeck Seng SSAP DMSM MP
- 黄日昇

Chairman of the Keretapi Tanah Melayu Berhad
- Assuming office TBA
- Minister: Anwar Ibrahim (Minister of Finance); Amir Hamzah Azizan (Minister of Finance II)
- Chief Executive Officer: Mohd Rani Hisham Samsudin
- Succeeding: Musa Sheikh Fadzir

Deputy Minister of Plantation Industries and Commodities I
- In office 30 August 2021 – 24 November 2022 Serving with Willie Mongin (Deputy Minister of Plantation Industries and Commodities II)
- Monarch: Abdullah
- Prime Minister: Ismail Sabri Yaakob
- Minister: Zuraida Kamaruddin
- Preceded by: Himself
- Succeeded by: Siti Aminah Aching (Deputy Minister of Plantation Industries and Commodities)
- Constituency: Tanjung Piai
- In office 10 March 2020 – 16 August 2021 Serving with Willie Mongin (Deputy Minister of Plantation Industries and Commodities II)
- Monarch: Abdullah
- Prime Minister: Muhyiddin Yassin
- Minister: Khairuddin Razali
- Preceded by: Shamsul Iskandar Md. Akin (Deputy Minister of Primary Industries)
- Succeeded by: Himself
- Constituency: Tanjung Piai

Deputy Minister of Youth and Sports
- In office 19 March 2008 – 4 June 2010 Serving with Razali Ibrahim (2009–2010)
- Monarch: Mizan Zainal Abidin
- Prime Minister: Abdullah Ahmad Badawi (2008–2009); Najib Razak (2009–2010)
- Minister: Ismail Sabri Yaakob (2008–2009); Ahmad Shabery Cheek (2009–2010)
- Preceded by: Liow Tiong Lai
- Succeeded by: Gan Ping Sieu
- Constituency: Tanjung Piai

Member of the Malaysian Parliament for Tanjung Piai
- Incumbent
- Assumed office 16 November 2019
- Preceded by: Mohamed Farid Md Rafik (PH–BERSATU)
- Majority: 15,086 (2019); 6,360 (2022)
- In office 8 March 2008 – 9 May 2018
- Preceded by: Ong Ka Ting (BN–MCA)
- Succeeded by: Mohamed Farid Md Rafik (PH–BERSATU)
- Majority: 12,371 (2008); 5,457 (2013)

Member of the Johor State Legislative Assembly for Pekan Nanas
- In office 21 March 2004 – 8 March 2008
- Preceded by: Position established
- Succeeded by: Tang Nai Soon (BN–MCA)
- Majority: 11,162 (2004)

Chairman of the Labuan Port Authority
- In office 16 March 2017 – 26 June 2018
- Minister: Liow Tiong Lai (2017–2018); Anthony Loke Siew Fook (2018)
- Succeeded by: Chan Foong Hin

Vice President of the Malaysian Chinese Association
- Incumbent
- Assumed office 24 September 2023 Serving with Lim Ban Hong & Tan Teik Cheng & Lawrence Low Ah Keong
- President: Wee Ka Siong

Personal details
- Born: 20 April 1964 (age 62) Pontian Kechil, Pontian, Johor, Malaysia
- Citizenship: Malaysian
- Party: Malaysian Chinese Association (MCA)
- Other political affiliations: Barisan Nasional (BN)
- Spouse: Lin Ruyun
- Children: 3
- Education: University of Sunderland; Northern University of Malaysia
- Occupation: Politician
- Website: ybweejeckseng.blogspot.com
- Wee Jeck Seng on Facebook

Wee Jeck Seng
- Traditional Chinese: 黃日昇
- Simplified Chinese: 黄日升
Transcriptions
Standard Mandarin
- Hanyu Pinyin: Huáng Rìshēng
Southern Min
- Hokkien POJ: Ûiⁿ Ji̍t-sing

Wee Jeck Seng (Chinese: 黃日昇; pinyin: Huáng Rìshēng; Pe̍h-ōe-jī: Ûiⁿ Ji̍t-seng; born 20 April 1964) is a Malaysian politician who is the Chairman-designate of the Keretapi Tanah Melayu Berhad (KTMB) and the Member of Parliament (MP) for Tanjung Piai from March 2008 to May 2018 and again since November 2019. He served as the Deputy Minister of Plantation Industries and Commodities I for the second term in the Barisan Nasional (BN) administration under former Prime Minister Ismail Sabri Yaakob and former Minister Zuraida Kamaruddin from August 2021 to the collapse of the BN administration in November 2022 and the first term in the Perikatan Nasional (PN) administration under former Prime Minister Muhyiddin Yassin and former Minister Khairuddin Razali from March 2020 to the collapse of the PN administration in August 2021, Deputy Minister of Youth and Sports in the BN administration under former Prime Ministers Abdullah Ahmad Badawi and Najib Razak as well as former Ministers Ismail Sabri Yaakob and Ahmad Shabery Cheek from March 2008 to his defeat in the 2010 MCA leadership election in June 2010 and Member of the Johor State Legislative Assembly (MLA) for Pekan Nanas from March 2004 to March 2008 as well as Chairman of the Labuan Port Authority (LPA) from March 2017 to June 2018. He is a member and member of the Central Committee of the Malaysian Chinese Association (MCA), a component party of the BN coalition. He has also served as the Vice President of MCA since September 2023.

== Background ==
Wee was born on 20 April 1964 at his hometown in Pontian, Johor. He is married to Lin Ruyun. He graduated with Bachelor of Business Management from the University of Sunderland. Wee received his Doctorate in Public Management from Universiti Utara Malaysia in 2019.

== Political career ==
Wee was first elected as member of the Johor State Legislative Assembly for Pekan Nanas constituency for one term from 2004 to 2008. Prior to Wee's election, he was MCA president Ong Ka Ting's political secretary. Wee was elected to federal Parliament in the 2008 general election for the seat of Tanjong Piai. Wee was nominated for the seat by MCA after it was vacated by Ong to contest Kulai seat.

Immediately after his election to the Dewan Rakyat, Parliament in 2008, Wee was appointed as a Deputy Minister of Youth and Sports in the government of prime minister Abdullah Ahmad Badawi. He retained his appointment when incoming prime minister Najib Razak reshuffled the ministry in April 2009. However, he was dropped from the ministry in June 2010 following MCA leadership elections.

Wee won and retained his Tanjong Piai parliamentary seat in the 2013 general election but lost his parliamentary seat to Mohamed Farid Md Rafik from the Malaysian United Indigenous Party (BERSATU) of Pakatan Harapan (PH) in the 2018 general election.

In November 2019, Wee managed to return as an opposition MP for Tanjung Piai after he was chosen by the BN as their candidate again to contest the 2019 Tanjung Piai by-election set-upon by the sudden death of incumbent Mohamed Farid and won the six-cornered polls with a landslide majority of 15,086 votes.

=== Chairman of the Keretapi Tanah Melayu Berhad (since 2023) ===
According to media reports on 5 May 2023, Wee had been nominated by MCA for the position of Chairman of KTMB to take over Musa Sheikh Fadzir. Wee is also the first ever MCA politician to be appointed to an additional position besides the MP after the coalition government led by Prime Minister Anwar Ibrahim took over the administration on 24 November 2022. However on 12 May 2023, Minister of Transport Anthony Loke added that he had not learned about the appointment and reminded that it was within the authority of the Ministry of Finance and not his ministry.

== Controversy ==
In the 2019 Tanjung Piai by-election campaigning time where Wee was a candidate then, he was accused of wasting public funds recklessly during his term as Labuan Port Authority (LPA) chairman from 2017 to 2018 by his successor Chan Foong Hin. It was disclosed under Wee, the LPA had committed to a three-year tenancy for an office at Menara UOA, in Bangsar, Kuala Lumpur which was never occupied that would amount to RM526,836.96 and had splurged on its renovations included a high-tech toilet with auto/smart toilet bowl, in which the bill came up to RM343,180.50.

== Election results ==
Johor State Legislative Assembly
Year	Constituency	Candidate	Votes	Pct	Opponent(s)	Votes	Pct	Ballots cast	Majority	Turnout
2004	N55 Pekan Nenas	Wee Jeck Seng (MCA)	15,395	75.80%	Tan Hang Meng (DAP)	4,233	20.84%	20,309	11,162	76.33%

Parliament of Malaysia
Year	Constituency	Candidate	Votes	Pct	Opponent(s)	Votes	Pct	Ballots cast	Majority	Turnout
2008	P165 Tanjung Piai	Wee Jeck Seng (MCA)	23,302	65.52%	Ahmad Ton (DAP)	10,931	30.74%	35,564	12,371	77.82%
2013	P165 Tanjung Piai	Wee Jeck Seng (MCA)	25,038	54.88%	Mahdzir Ibrahim (DAP)	19,581	42.92%	45,622	5,457	87.90%
2018	P165 Tanjung Piai	Wee Jeck Seng (MCA)	20,731	46.12%	Mohamed Farid Md Rafik (BERSATU)	21,255	47.29%	45,858	524	85.67%
2018	P165 Tanjung Piai	Wee Jeck Seng (MCA)	20,731	46.12%	Nordin Othman (PAS)	2,962	6.59%	45,858	524	85.67%
2019	P165 Tanjung Piai	Wee Jeck Seng (MCA)	25,486	65.60%	Karmaine Sardini (BERSATU)	10,380	26.74%	38,815	15,086	74.43%
2019	P165 Tanjung Piai	Wee Jeck Seng (MCA)	25,486	65.60%	Wendy Subramaniam (Gerakan)	1,707	4.40%	38,815	15,086	74.43%
2019	P165 Tanjung Piai	Wee Jeck Seng (MCA)	25,486	65.60%	Badhrulhisham Abd Aziz (BERJASA)	850	2.19%	38,815	15,086	74.43%
2019	P165 Tanjung Piai	Wee Jeck Seng (MCA)	25,486	65.60%	Ang Chuan Lock (IND)	380	0.98%	38,815	15,086	74.43%
2019	P165 Tanjung Piai	Wee Jeck Seng (MCA)	25,486	65.60%	Faridah Aryani Abd Ghaffar (IND)	32	0.08%	38,815	15,086	74.43%
2022	P165 Tanjung Piai	Wee Jeck Seng (MCA)	23,593	43.22%	Lim Wei Jiet (MUDA)	17,233	31.57%	55,106	6,360	77.23%
2022	P165 Tanjung Piai	Wee Jeck Seng (MCA)	23,593	43.22%	Najwah Halimah Ab Alim (BERSATU)	13,762	25.21%	55,106	6,360	77.23%

== Honours ==
=== Honours of Malaysia ===
- Malaysia
  - Recipient of the 17th Yang di-Pertuan Agong Installation Medal (2024)
- Malacca
  - Companion Class I of the Exalted Order of Malacca (DMSM) – Datuk (2009)
- Pahang
  - Knight Grand Companion of the Order of Sultan Ahmad Shah of Pahang (SSAP) – Dato' Sri (2016)
