= Pekan Nanas (state constituency) =

Political subdivision in Malaysia

Pekan Nanas (N55)
Johor constituency

State constituency
- Legislature: Johor State Legislative Assembly
MLA
Tan Eng Meng
BN
- Constituency created: 2003
- First contested: 2004
- Last contested: 2026

Demographics
- Population (2020): 51,711
- Electors (2026): 37,556
- Area (km²): 212

Pekan Nanas is a state constituency in Johor, Malaysia, that is represented in the Johor State Legislative Assembly.

The state constituency was first contested in 2004 and is mandated to return a single Assemblyman to the Johor State Legislative Assembly under the first-past-the-post voting system.

== Demographics ==
As of 2020, Pekan Nanas has a population of 51,711 people.

Ethnic breakdown of Pekan Nanas's electorate as of 2026
1. Malay (56.2%)
2. Chinese (41.0%)
3. Other ethnicities (1.60%)
4. Indian (1.10%)

== History ==
=== Polling districts ===
According to the gazette issued on 2 July 2026, the Pekan Nanas constituency has a total of 11 polling districts.

State constituency	Poling Districts	Code	Location
Pekan Nanas (N55)	Parit Kudus	165/55/01	SK Parit Kudus
Pekan Nanas (N55)	Tanjong Ayer Hitam	165/55/02	SK Tanjong Ayer Hitam
Pekan Nanas (N55)	Ladang South Malaya	165/55/03	SK Parit Haji Adnan
Pekan Nanas (N55)	Melayu Raya	165/55/04	SK Melayu Raya
Pekan Nanas (N55)	Kampong Lubok Sawah	165/55/05	SK Kampung Sawah
Pekan Nanas (N55)	Tenggayon	165/55/06	SK Seri Bunian
Pekan Nanas (N55)	Pengkalan Raja Pontian	165/55/07	SK Pengkalan Raja
Pekan Nanas (N55)	Bandar Pekan Nenas Barat	165/55/08	SMK Dato' Mohd. Yunos Sulaiman
Pekan Nanas (N55)	Bandar Pekan Nenas Timor	165/55/09	SMK Pekan Nanas
Pekan Nanas (N55)	Bandar Pekan Nenas Tengah	165/55/10	SK Pekan Nanas; SA Pekan Nanas
Pekan Nanas (N55)	Bandar Pekan Nenas Selatan	165/55/11	SJK (C) Yu Ming (1); SK Batu 24

=== Representation history ===
Members of the Legislative Assembly for Pekan Nanas
Assembly	No	Years	Member	Party
Constituency split from Pulai Sebatang and Kukup
Pekan Nenas
11th	N55	2004–2008	Wee Jeck Seng (黃日昇)	BN (MCA)
12th	N55	2008–2013	Tang Nai Soon (宋乃順)	BN (MCA)
13th	N55	2013–2018	Yeo Tung Siong (楊敦祥)	PR (DAP)
Pekan Nanas
14th	N55	2018–2022	Yeo Tung Siong (楊敦祥)	PH (DAP)
15th	N55	2022–2026	Tan Eng Meng (陳勇鳴)	BN (MCA)
16th	N55	2026-present	Tan Eng Meng (陳勇鳴)	BN (MCA)

== Election results ==
Johor state election, 2026
Party	Candidate	Votes	%	∆%
BN	Tan Eng Meng	19,951	72.23	▲21.00
PH	Yeo Tung Siong	7,670	27.77	▼1.16
Total valid votes		27,621	100.00	
Total rejected ballots		424		
Unreturned ballots		20		
Turnout		28,065	74.73	▲13.85
Registered electors		37,556		
Majority		12,281	44.46	▲21.86
BN hold		Swing		

Johor state election, 2022
Party	Candidate	Votes	%	∆%
BN	Tan Eng Meng	11,024	51.53	▲4.45
PH	Yeo Tung Siong	6,189	28.93	▲28.93
PN	Tan Chin Hok	2,741	12.81	▲12.81
Heritage	Hishamuddin Busri	1,438	6.72	▲6.72
Total valid votes		21,392	97.97	
Total rejected ballots		335	1.53	
Unreturned ballots		108	0.49	
Turnout		21,835	60.88	▼25.55
Registered electors		35,865		
Majority		4,835	22.60	▲16.76
BN gain from PKR		Swing		+14.42

Johor state election, 2018
Party	Candidate	Votes	%	∆%
PKR	Yeo Tung Siong	11,856	52.92	▲52.92
BN	Tan Eng Meng	10,548	47.08	▲1.81
Total valid votes		22,404	97.42	
Total rejected ballots		554	2.41	
Unreturned ballots		39	0.17	
Turnout		22,997	86.43	▼1.94
Registered electors		26,608		
Majority		1,308	5.84	▼3.62
PKR hold		Swing		-1.31

Johor state election, 2013
Party	Candidate	Votes	%	∆%
DAP	Yeo Tung Siong	15,436	54.73	▲12.54
BN	Wong You Fong	12,767	45.27	▼12.54
Total valid votes		28,203	98.24	
Total rejected ballots		505	1.76	
Unreturned ballots		0	0.00	
Turnout		28,708	88.37	▲10.74
Registered electors		32,486		
Majority		2,669	9.46	▼6.16
DAP gain from BN		Swing		+12.30
Source(s) "Federal Government Gazette – Notice of Contested Election, State Legislative Assembly for the State of Selangor [P.U. (B) 192/2013]" (PDF). Attorney General's Chambers of Malaysia. 26 April 2013. Archived from the original (PDF) on 29 December 2019. "Federal Government Gazette – Results of Contested Election and Statements of the Poll after the Official Addition of Votes, State Constituencies for the State of Selangor [P.U. (B) 233/2013]" (PDF). Attorney General's Chambers of Malaysia. 22 May 2013. Archived from the original (PDF) on October 2, 2018.

Johor state election, 2008
Party	Candidate	Votes	%	∆%
BN	Tang Nai Soon	12,297	57.81	▼20.62
DAP	Ahmad Ton	8,973	42.19	▲20.62
Total valid votes		21,270	97.81	
Total rejected ballots		476	2.19	
Unreturned ballots		0	0.00	
Turnout		21,746	77.63	▲1.30
Registered electors		28,012		
Majority		3,324	15.62	▼41.24
BN hold		Swing		-19.84

Johor state election, 2004
Party	Candidate	Votes	%
BN	Wee Jeck Seng	15,395	78.43
DAP	Tan Haw Meng	4,233	21.57
Total valid votes		19,628	96.65
Total rejected ballots		681	3.35
Unreturned ballots		0	0.00
Turnout		20,309	76.33
Registered electors		26,607	
Majority		11,162	56.86
This was a new constituency created.
