= Kota Bharu (federal constituency) =

Federal constituency of Kelantan, Malaysia

Kota Bharu (P021)
Kelantan constituency

Federal constituency
- Legislature: Dewan Rakyat
- MP: Takiyuddin Hassan; PN
- Constituency created: 1974
- First contested: 1974
- Last contested: 2022

Demographics
- Population (2020): 130,801
- Electors (2023): 115,466
- Area (km²): 33
- Pop. density (per km²): 3,963.7

Kota Bharu is a federal constituency in Kota Bharu District, Kelantan, Malaysia, that has been represented in the Dewan Rakyat since 1974.

The federal constituency was created in the 1974 redistribution and is mandated to return a single member to the Dewan Rakyat under the first past the post voting system.

== Demographics ==
Ethnic breakdown of Kota Bharu's electorate as of 2022
1. Malay (94.4%)
2. Chinese (3.69%)
3. Indian (0.75%)
4. Other ethnicities (1.17%)

As for 2020, Kota Bharu has a population of 130,801 people.

Age breakdown of Kota Bharu's electorate as of 2022
1. 18-20 (5.45%)
2. 21-29 (20.9%)
3. 30-39 (24.0%)
4. 40-49 (16.8%)
5. 50-59 (13.8%)
6. 60-69 (11.3%)
7. 70-79 (5.74%)
8. 80-89 (1.62%)
9. above 90 (0.43%)
Gender breakdown of Kota Bharu's electorate as of 2022
1. Male (49.3%)
2. Female (50.7%)

== History ==
=== Polling districts ===
According to the federal gazette issued on 18 July 2023, the Kota Bharu constituency is divided into 33 polling districts.

State constituency	Polling Districts	Code	Location
Tanjong Mas (N08）	Wakaf Mek Zainab	021/08/01	SK Tengku Indera Petra
Tanjong Mas (N08）	Tanjong Chat	021/08/02	SK Padang Garong 2
Tanjong Mas (N08）	Sungai Keladi	021/08/03	SMK Putera
Tanjong Mas (N08）	Kok Pasir	021/08/04	SMK Tanjung Mas
Tanjong Mas (N08）	Khatib Ali	021/08/05	SMK Dato' Ahmad Maher
Tanjong Mas (N08）	Tanjong Mas	021/08/06	Maahad Muhammadi (Lelaki)
Tanjong Mas (N08）	Cherang	021/08/07	SK Sultan Ismail (4)
Tanjong Mas (N08）	Kampung Bayam	021/08/08	SK Sultan Ismail (2)
Tanjong Mas (N08）	Langgar	021/08/09	SK Langgar
Tanjong Mas (N08）	Paya Bemban	021/08/10	SK Islah
Kota Lama (N09）	Kubang Pasu	021/09/01	SMK Zainab 2
Kota Lama (N09）	Kelochor	021/09/02	SJK (C) Chung Cheng
Kota Lama (N09）	Kebun Sultan	021/09/03	SJK (C) Chung Hwa
Kota Lama (N09）	Merbau	021/09/04	SK Merbau
Kota Lama (N09）	Atas Banggol	021/09/05	SMJK Chung Hwa
Kota Lama (N09）	Jalan Pejabat Pos Lama	021/09/06	Maahadi Muhammadi (Perempuan)
Kota Lama (N09）	Bandar	021/09/07	SMJK Chung Cheng
Kota Lama (N09）	Padang Garong	021/09/08	SK Padang Garong 1
Kota Lama (N09）	Kota Lama	021/09/09	Kolej Poly-Tech MARA Kota Bharu
Kota Lama (N09）	Islah Lama	021/09/10	SK Sri Bemban
Kota Lama (N09）	Kampung Dusun	021/09/11	SK Padang Garong 1
Kota Lama (N09）	Kubor Kuda	021/09/12	SK Kampung Sireh
Bunut Payong（N10）	Kg Sireh Bawah Lembah	021/10/01	Tadika Tg. Anis 1
Bunut Payong（N10）	Kubor Kuda	021/10/02	SMA Naim Lil-Banat
Bunut Payong（N10）	Jalan Raja Dewa	021/10/03	SMK Sultan Ismail
Bunut Payong（N10）	Telipot	021/10/04	Maktab Sultan Ismail
Bunut Payong（N10）	Kampung Belukar	021/10/05	SMK Zainab (1)
Bunut Payong（N10）	Bunut Payong Hilir	021/10/06	SK Sultan Ismail (1)
Bunut Payong（N10）	Pintu Geng	021/10/07	SMK Pintu Geng
Bunut Payong（N10）	Kota Utara	021/10/08	SK Kota
Bunut Payong（N10）	Lundang	021/10/09	SK Lundang
Bunut Payong（N10）	Bunut Payong	021/10/10	SK Bunut Payong
Bunut Payong（N10）	Kampung Wakaf Che Yeh	021/10/11	SMK Kota

=== Representation history ===
Members of Parliament for Kota Bharu
Parliament	No	Years	Member	Party	Vote Share
Constituency created, renamed from Kota Bharu Hilir, Kota Bharu Hulu and Pengkalan Chepa
Kota Baharu
4th	P019	1974–1978	Tengku Ahmad Rithauddeen Tengku Ismail (تڠکو أحمد رضاءالدين تڠکو إسماعيل)	BN (UMNO)	Uncontested
5th	P019	1978–1982	Tengku Ahmad Rithauddeen Tengku Ismail (تڠکو أحمد رضاءالدين تڠکو إسماعيل)	BN (UMNO)	18,136; 65.73%
6th	P019	1982–1986	Tengku Ahmad Rithauddeen Tengku Ismail (تڠکو أحمد رضاءالدين تڠکو إسماعيل)	BN (UMNO)	21,424; 58.26%
7th	P019	1986–1990	Tengku Ahmad Rithauddeen Tengku Ismail (تڠکو أحمد رضاءالدين تڠکو إسماعيل)	BN (UMNO)	20,310; 57.07%
8th	P019	1990–1995	Ilani Isahak (إيلاني إسحاق)	APU (S46)	27,566; 68.61%
Kota Bharu
9th	P021	1995–1999	Ilani Isahak (إيلاني إسحاق)	APU (S46)	24,096; 57.48%
10th	P021	1999–2004	Ramli Ibrahim (رملي إبراهيم)	BA (keADILan)	26,723; 61.22%
11th	P021	2004–2008	Mohd Zaid Ibrahim (محمد زيد إبراهيم)	BN (UMNO)	23,831; 51.88%
12th	P021	2008–2013	Wan Abdul Rahim Wan Abdullah (وان عبدالرحيم وان عبدﷲ)	PR (PAS)	32,129; 60.66%
13th	P021	2013–2015	Takiyuddin Hassan (تَقِيُ ٱلدِّين حَسَّان)	PR (PAS)	40,620; 62.09%
13th	P021	2015–2016	Takiyuddin Hassan (تَقِيُ ٱلدِّين حَسَّان)	PAS	40,620; 62.09%
13th	P021	2016–2018	Takiyuddin Hassan (تَقِيُ ٱلدِّين حَسَّان)	GS (PAS)	40,620; 62.09%
14th	P021	2018–2020	Takiyuddin Hassan (تَقِيُ ٱلدِّين حَسَّان)	GS (PAS)	28,291; 42.24%
14th	P021	2020–2022	Takiyuddin Hassan (تَقِيُ ٱلدِّين حَسَّان)	PN (PAS)	28,291; 42.24%
15th	P021	2022–present	Takiyuddin Hassan (تَقِيُ ٱلدِّين حَسَّان)	PN (PAS)	41,869; 53.67%

=== State constituency ===
Parliamentary constituency	State constituency						
Parliamentary constituency	1955–1959*	1959–1974	1974–1986	1986–1995	1995–2004	2004–2018	2018–present
Kota Bharu				Bunut Payong			
Kota Bharu					Kota Lama		
Kota Bharu			Kubang Kerian				
Kota Bharu				Lundang			
Kota Bharu				Padang Garong			
Kota Bharu			Sungei Keladi				
Kota Bharu					Tanjong Mas		
Kota Bharu			Telipot				

=== Historical boundaries ===
State Constituency	Area				
State Constituency	1974	1984	1994	2003	2018
Bunut Payong		Bunut Payong; Kampung Kota; Kampung Paloh; Kampung Sireh; Taman Hilal			
Kota Lama			Jalan Atas Banggol; Kampung Che Mat Baba; Kampung Paya Purnama; Kota Bharu; Kubang Pasu	Kampung Dusun; Kampung Langgar; Kebun Sultan; Kota Bharu; Kubang Pasu	
Kubang Kerian	Kampung Wakaf Stan; Kubang Kerian; Pasir Hor; Pasir Tumboh; Wakaf Che Yeh				
Lundang		Demit; Pasir Hor; Jejulok; Kampung Wakaf Stan; Kubang Kerian			
Padang Garong		Kampung Paya Purnama; Kota Bharu; Kubang Pasu; Langgar; Padang Garong			
Sungei Keladi	Kampung Paya Purnama; Kota Bharu; Kubang Pasu; Langgar; Padang Garong				
Tanjong Mas			Kampung Belukar; Kampung Dusun Raja; Kampung Kok Pasir; Tanjung Chat; Tanjung Mas	Kampung Cherang; Kampung Guchil; Kampung Kok Pasir; Tanjung Chat; Tanjung Mas	Kampung Cherang; Kampung Huda; Kampung Kok Pasir; Tanjung Chat; Tanjung Mas
Telipot	Bunut Payong; Kampung Dusun; Kampung Langgar; Kampung Kota; Telipot				

=== Current state assembly members ===
No.	State Constituency	Member	Coalition (Party)
N08	Tanjong Mas	Rohani Ibrahim	PN (PAS)
N09	Kota Lama	Hafidzah Mustakim	PH (AMANAH)
N10	Bunut Payong	Shaari Mat Yaman	PN (PAS)

=== Local governments & postcodes ===
No.	State Constituency	Local Government	Postcode
N08	Tanjong Mas	Kota Bharu Municipal Council	15000, 15050, 15100, 15150, 15200, 15300, 13500, 15400, 15500, 15502, 15503, 15506, 15520, 15680 Kota Bharu
N09	Kota Lama	Kota Bharu Municipal Council	15000, 15050, 15100, 15150, 15200, 15300, 13500, 15400, 15500, 15502, 15503, 15506, 15520, 15680 Kota Bharu
N10	Bunut Payong	Kota Bharu Municipal Council	15000, 15050, 15100, 15150, 15200, 15300, 13500, 15400, 15500, 15502, 15503, 15506, 15520, 15680 Kota Bharu

== Election results ==
Malaysian general election, 2022
Party	Candidate	Votes	%	∆%
PAS	Takiyuddin Hassan	41,869	53.67	▲11.43
PH	Hafidzah Mustakim	19,256	24.68	▲24.68
BN	Rosmadi Ismail	16,168	20.72	▼3.55
PUTRA	Che Musa Che Omar	528	0.68	▲0.68
Parti Rakyat Malaysia	Andy Tan @ Awang	107	0.14	▲0.14
Independent	Izat Bukhary	91	0.12	▲0.12
Total valid votes		78,019	100.00	
Total rejected ballots		721		
Unreturned ballots		288		
Turnout		79,028	67.58	▼9.42
Registered electors		115,450		
Majority		22,613	28.99	▲20.23
PAS hold		Swing		
Source(s) https://lom.agc.gov.my/ilims/upload/portal/akta/outputp/1753266/PUB%20607%20(2022).pdf

Malaysian general election, 2018
Party	Candidate	Votes	%	∆%
PAS	Takiyuddin Hassan	28,291	42.24	▼19.85
PKR	Husam Musa	22,422	33.48	▲33.48
BN	Fikhran Hamshi Mohamad Fatmi	16,256	24.27	▼13.41
Total valid votes		66,969	100.00	
Total rejected ballots		689		
Unreturned ballots		648		
Turnout		68,306	77.00	▼4.55
Registered electors		88,708		
Majority		5,869	8.76	▼15.65
PAS hold		Swing		
Source(s) "His Majesty's Government Gazette - Notice of Contested Election, Parliament for the State of Kelantan [P.U. (B) 234/2018]" (PDF). Attorney General's Chambers of Malaysia. 3 May 2018. "Federal Government Gazette - Results of Contested Election and Statements of the Poll after the Official Addition of Votes, Parliamentary Constituencies for the State of Kelantan [P.U. (B) 308/2018]" (PDF). Attorney General's Chambers of Malaysia. 28 May 2018.

Malaysian general election, 2013
Party	Candidate	Votes	%	∆%
PAS	Takiyuddin Hassan	40,620	62.09	▲1.43
BN	Mohamad Fatmi Che Salleh	24,650	37.68	▼1.66
Independent	Mohd Zakiman Abu Bakar	148	0.23	▲0.23
Total valid votes		65,418	100.00	
Total rejected ballots		666		
Unreturned ballots		193		
Turnout		66,277	81.55	▲2.87
Registered electors		81,268		
Majority		15,970	24.41	▲3.09
PAS hold		Swing		
Source(s) "Federal Government Gazette - Notice of Contested Election, Parliament for the State of Kelantan [P.U. (B) 171/2013]" (PDF). Attorney General's Chambers of Malaysia. 26 April 2013. "Federal Government Gazette - Results of Contested Election and Statements of the Poll after the Official Addition of Votes, Parliamentary Constituencies for the State of Kelantan [P.U. (B) 212/2013]" (PDF). Attorney General's Chambers of Malaysia. 22 May 2013. Archived from the original (PDF) on 2019-12-29.

Malaysian general election, 2008
Party	Candidate	Votes	%	∆%
PAS	Wan Abdul Rahim Wan Abdullah	32,129	60.66	▲60.66
BN	Mohamad Fatmi Che Salleh	20,841	39.34	▼12.54
Total valid votes		52,970	100.00	
Total rejected ballots		609		
Unreturned ballots		131		
Turnout		53,710	78.68	▲2.62
Registered electors		68,261		
Majority		11,288	21.32	▲17.56
PAS gain from BN		Swing		?

Malaysian general election, 2004
Party	Candidate	Votes	%	∆%
BN	Mohd Zaid Ibrahim	23,831	51.88	▲14.04
PKR	Nik Mahmood Nik Hassan	22,108	48.12	▼13.10
Total valid votes		45,939	100.00	
Total rejected ballots		768		
Unreturned ballots		0		
Turnout		46,707	76.06	▲5.03
Registered electors		61,408		
Majority		1,723	3.76	▼19.62
BN gain from PKR		Swing		?

Malaysian general election, 1999
Party	Candidate	Votes	%	∆%
PKR	Ramli Ibrahim	26,723	61.22	▲61.22
BN	Ilani Isahak	16,517	37.84	▼4.68
Pan-Malaysian Islamic Front	Mohd Din Nizam Din	409	0.94	▲0.94
Total valid votes		43,649	100.00	
Total rejected ballots		995		
Unreturned ballots		118		
Turnout		44,762	71.03	▼0.28
Registered electors		63,018		
Majority		10,206	23.38	▲8.42
PKR gain from S46		Swing		?

Malaysian general election, 1995
Party	Candidate	Votes	%	∆%
S46	Ilani Isahak	24,096	57.48	▼11.13
BN	Ahmad Rastom Ahmad Maher	17,828	42.52	▲12.38
Total valid votes		41,924	100.00	
Total rejected ballots		902		
Unreturned ballots		224		
Turnout		43,050	71.31	▼2.04
Registered electors		60,370		
Majority		6,268	14.96	▼23.51
S46 hold		Swing		

Malaysian general election, 1990
Party	Candidate	Votes	%	∆%
S46	Ilani Isahak	27,566	68.61	▲68.61
BN	Tengku Ahmad Rithauddeen Tengku Ismail	12,106	30.14	▼26.93
Independent	Saifuddin Daud	503	1.25	▲1.25
Total valid votes		40,175	100.00	
Total rejected ballots		1,079		
Unreturned ballots		0		
Turnout		41,254	73.35	▲4.39
Registered electors		56,610		
Majority		15,460	38.47	▲24.33
S46 gain from BN		Swing		?

Malaysian general election, 1986
Party	Candidate	Votes	%	∆%
BN	Tengku Ahmad Rithauddeen Tengku Ismail	20,310	57.07	▼1.19
PAS	Hassan Abdullah	15,277	42.93	▲6.34
Total valid votes		35,587	100.00	
Total rejected ballots		695		
Unreturned ballots		0		
Turnout		36,282	68.96	▼5.80
Registered electors		52,613		
Majority		5,033	14.14	▼7.53
BN hold		Swing		

Malaysian general election, 1982
Party	Candidate	Votes	%	∆%
BN	Tengku Ahmad Rithauddeen Tengku Ismail	21,424	58.26	▼7.47
PAS	Salehudin Abdullah	13,454	36.59	▲2.32
DAP	Kang Sam Chuan	1,896	5.16	▲5.16
Total valid votes		36,774	100.00	
Total rejected ballots		784		
Unreturned ballots		0		
Turnout		37,558	74.76	▲6.98
Registered electors		50,238		
Majority		7,970	21.67	▼9.79
BN hold		Swing		

Malaysian general election, 1978
Party	Candidate	Votes	%	∆%
BN	Tengku Ahmad Rithauddeen Tengku Ismail	18,136	65.73	▲65.73
PAS	Lah	9,454	34.27	▲34.27
Total valid votes		27,590	100.00	
Total rejected ballots		308		
Unreturned ballots		0		
Turnout		27,898	67.78	
Registered electors		41,162		
Majority		8,682	31.46	
BN hold		Swing		

Malaysian general election, 1974
Party	Candidate	Votes	%	∆%
On the nomination day, Tengku Ahmad Rithauddeen Tengku Ismail won uncontested.
BN	Tengku Ahmad Rithauddeen Tengku Ismail			
Total valid votes			100.00	
Total rejected ballots				
Unreturned ballots				
Turnout				
Registered electors		38,958		
Majority				
This was a new constituency created.
