= Mohamad Fatmi Che Salleh =

Malaysian politician

Yang Berbahagia Tan Sri Mohamad Fatmi Che Salleh PSM DJMK DMSM JP
- محمد فطمي چئ صالح

Senator Appointed by the Yang di-Pertuan Agong
- In office 25 April 2022 – 24 April 2025
- Monarchs: Abdullah (2022–2024); Ibrahim (2024-)
- Prime Minister: Ismail Sabri Yaakob (2022); Anwar Ibrahim (2022–present)

Personal details
- Born: Mohamad Fatmi bin Che Salleh; 12 April 1957 (age 68) Kota Bharu, Kelantan, Federation of Malaya (now Malaysia)
- Citizenship: Malaysian
- Spouse: Hajjah Norsiah Haji Musa
- Children: 6 (Including Fikhran Hamshi Mohamad Fatmi)

Mohamad Fatmi bin Che Salleh (born 12 April 1957) is a Malaysian politician and was one of the longest serving Political Secretary to Najib Razak, former Prime Minister of Malaysia. He is a member of United Malays National Organisation (UMNO); a component party of Barisan Nasional (BN) coalition.

Mohamad Fatmi had contested but lost twice in both the 2008 general election and the 2013 general election for the Kota Bharu parliamentary seat. He had also earlier lost contesting the Kelantan State Legislative Assembly seat of Tanjong Mas in the 1995 general election.

== Education ==
He graduated from Tulane University, New Orleans Louisiana, USA with Master Of Business Administration (MBA) Finance in 1981 and hold Bachelor Of Science (BSc) Marketing from Southern Illinois University Carbondale, Illinois USA in 1979.

== Mix Parentage ==
Mohamad Fatmi came from a lineage of Chinese-Muslim. His great-great grandfather (Abdul Halim) came from China as a boy and was adopted by the Sultan of Kelantan. His great-great grandfather then was sent to Mecca to study the religion of Islam and came back as a religious scholar. He is well accepted among the Chinese and Malay community in Kelantan because of his well mannered persona.

== Accompanying the Sultan of Kelantan ==
Mohamad Fatmi was part of the entourage accompanying the Sultan of Kelantan Sultan Muhammad V during his pilgrimage to the Holy Land Mecca from 10 November 2010 to 23 November 2010. Others in the entourage included the Menteri Besar of Kelantan Dato' Haji Tuan Guru Nik Aziz Nik Mat and the Minister of International Trade and Industry Dato' Sri Mustapa Mohamed.

== Kota Bharu UMNO Division ==
Mohamad Fatmi was elected as the new UMNO Chief for the Kota Bharu Division. Previously the post was held by the infamous ex-UMNO De facto Law Minister and also ex-Pakatan Rakyat member, Datuk Seri Zaid Ibrahim.

== Election results ==
Kelantan State Legislative Assembly
Year	Constituency	Candidate	Votes	Pct	Opponent(s)	Votes	Pct	Ballots cast	Majority	Turnout
1995	N07 Tanjong Mas	Mohamad Fatmi Che Salleh (UMNO)	4,228	30.76%	Wan Abdul Rahim Wan Abdullah (PAS)	9,213	67.02%	13,746	4,985	71.77%
1995	N07 Tanjong Mas	Mohamad Fatmi Che Salleh (UMNO)	4,228	30.76%	Ramli Sulaiman (AKIM)	57	0.41%	13,746	4,985	71.77%

Parliament of Malaysia
Year	Constituency	Candidate	Votes	Pct	Opponent(s)	Votes	Pct	Ballots cast	Majority	Turnout
2008	P021 Kota Bharu	Mohamad Fatmi Che Salleh (UMNO)	20,841	38.80%	Wan Abdul Rahim Wan Abdullah (PAS)	32,129	59.82%	53,710	11,288	78.68%
2013	P021 Kota Bharu	Mohamad Fatmi Che Salleh (UMNO)	24,650	37.68%	Takiyuddin Hassan (PAS)	40,620	62.09%	66,277	15,970	81.55%
2013	P021 Kota Bharu	Mohamad Fatmi Che Salleh (UMNO)	24,650	37.68%	Mohd Zakiman Abu Bakar (IND)	148	0.23%	66,277	15,970	81.55%

== Honours ==
=== Honours of Malaysia ===
- Malaysia
  - Commander of the Order of Loyalty to the Crown of Malaysia (PSM) – Tan Sri (2016)
  - Recipient of the 17th Yang di-Pertuan Agong Installation Medal (2024)
- Kedah
  - Justice of the Peace (JP) (2005)
- Kelantan
  - Knight Commander of the Order of the Life of the Crown of Kelantan (DJMK) – Dato' (2006)
- Malacca
  - Companion Class I of the Exalted Order of Malacca (DMSM) – Datuk (1994)
