= Wan Abdul Rahim Wan Abdullah =

Malaysian politician

Yang Berbahagia Datuk Wan Abdul Rahim Wan Abdullah DPSM
- وان عبدالرحيم وان عبدﷲ

Member of the Malaysian Parliament for Kota Bharu
- In office 8 March 2008 – 5 May 2013
- Preceded by: Zaid Ibrahim (BN–UMNO)
- Succeeded by: Takiyuddin Hassan (PR–PAS)
- Majority: 11,288 (2008)

Personal details
- Born: Wan Abdul Rahim bin Wan Abdullah; 24 February 1952 (age 74) Kelantan, Federation of Malaya (now Malaysia)
- Party: Malaysian Islamic Party (PAS) (until 2015); National Trust Party (AMANAH) (2015–present)
- Other political affiliations: Angkatan Perpaduan Ummah (APU) (until 1996); Barisan Alternatif (BA) (1998–2004); Pakatan Rakyat (PR) (2008–2015); Pakatan Harapan (PH) (2015–present)
- Spouse(s): Khadijah Abd Majid; Hassena Osman @ Sowan Rodi
- Occupation: Politician

Wan Abdul Rahim bin Wan Abdullah (born 24 February 1952) is a Malaysian politician. He was a former member of the Parliament of Malaysia for the Kota Bharu constituency in Kelantan from 2008 to 2013 representing the Pan-Malaysian Islamic Party (PAS) in the Pakatan Rakyat (PR) opposition coalition. However, since 2015, he has joined Parti Amanah Negara (AMANAH), a component party of the Pakatan Harapan (PH) new opposition coalition. Wan Abdul Rahim is also known popularly as Cikgu Rahim (literally means Teacher Rahim).

Wan Abdul Rahim was elected as a member of the Kelantan State Legislative Assembly (DUN) for Tanjong Mas constituency in 1995 and 1999 general elections, and served as the Assembly's Speaker (1995-2008).

In 2000, Wan Abdul Rahim urged PAS to accept female candidates for general elections, a position that was later adopted by the party in the 2004 general election.

In 2004 general election, he contested the federal constituency of Kuala Krai but lost. But he was elected to the federal seat of parliament for the Kota Bharu constituency in 2008. He initially sought to retire at the 2013 election, but instead contested the seat of Gua Musang, losing to its long-time incumbent Tengku Razaleigh Hamzah of the United Malays National Organisation (UMNO).

== Controversy ==
On 30 April 2002, Wan Abdul Rahim was found guilty for the offence of marrying a 22-year-old Cambodian woman, Hassena Osman alias Sowan Rodi in her country on 10 March 2002 without the approval of the Kelantan State Religious Council and sentenced to three days' jail and fined RM1,800 by the Syariah Court.

== Election results ==
Kelantan State Legislative Assembly
Year	Constituency	Candidate	Votes	Pct	Opponent(s)	Votes	Pct	Ballots cast	Majority	Turnout
1995	N07 Tanjong Mas	Wan Abdul Rahim Wan Abdullah (PAS)	9,213	67.02%	Mohamad Fatmi Che Salleh (UMNO)	4,228	30.76%	13,746	4,985	71.77%
1995	N07 Tanjong Mas	Wan Abdul Rahim Wan Abdullah (PAS)	9,213	67.02%	Ramli Sulaiman (AKIM)	57	0.41%	13,746	4,985	71.77%
1999	N07 Tanjong Mas	Wan Abdul Rahim Wan Abdullah (PAS)	10,843	74.42%	Mohd Zamri Ramli (UMNO)	3,530	24.23%	14,570	7,313	72.18%

Parliament of Malaysia
Year	Constituency	Candidate	Votes	Pct	Opponent(s)	Votes	Pct	Ballots cast	Majority	Turnout
1986	P029 Gua Musang	Wan Abdul Rahim Wan Abdullah (PAS)	5,219	29.39%	Tengku Razaleigh Hamzah (UMNO)	12,538	70.61%	18,250	7,319	76.11%
2004	P028 Kuala Krai	Wan Abdul Rahim Wan Abdullah (PAS)	16,732	45.63%	Mohamed Razali Che Mamat (UMNO)	19,148	52.22%	36,667	6,598	80.64%
2008	P021 Kota Bharu	Wan Abdul Rahim Wan Abdullah (PAS)	32,129	59.82%	Mohamad Fatmi Che Salleh (UMNO)	20,841	38.80%	53,710	11,288	78.68%
2013	P032 Gua Musang	Wan Abdul Rahim Wan Abdullah (PAS)	12,954	36.91%	Tengku Razaleigh Hamzah (UMNO)	21,367	60.88%	35,097	8,413	87.40%

== Honours ==
=== Honours of Malaysia ===
Wan Abdul Rahim was earlier conferred the Dato' Paduka Jiwa Mahkota Kelantan award which carries the title Dato' when he was the speaker in 2004 by Sultan Ismail Petra but the award was revoked by his son, Sultan Muhammad V in February 2018. In 2019, Wan Abdul Rahim was awarded Darjah Panguan Seri Melaka by Tuan Yang Terutama Yang Dipertua Negeri Melaka which carries the title Datuk.

- Kelantan
  - Knight Commander of the Order of the Life of the Crown of Kelantan (DJMK) – Dato' (2004, revoked on 6 February 2018)
  - ~~Justice of the Peace (JP)~~
- Malacca
  - Companion Class II of the Exalted Order of Malacca (DPSM) – Datuk (2019)
