= Takiyuddin Hassan =

Malaysian politician and lawyer (born 1961)

Yang Berhormat Datuk Seri Takiyuddin Hassan SJMK SMW DJMK MP
- تقي الدين حسن
- Takiyuddin in 2026

Minister of Energy and Natural Resources
- In office 30 August 2021 – 24 November 2022
- Monarch: Abdullah
- Prime Minister: Ismail Sabri Yaakob
- Deputy: Ali Biju
- Preceded by: Shamsul Anuar Nasarah
- Succeeded by: Nik Nazmi Nik Ahmad (Minister of Natural Resources, Environment and Climate Change)
- Constituency: Kota Bharu

Minister in the Prime Minister's Department (Parliament and Law)
- In office 10 March 2020 – 16 August 2021
- Monarch: Abdullah
- Prime Minister: Muhyiddin Yassin
- Deputy: Eddin Syazlee Shith (2020); Shabudin Yahaya (2020–2021)
- Preceded by: Liew Vui Keong (Law)
- Succeeded by: Wan Junaidi Tuanku Jaafar
- Constituency: Kota Bharu

Member of the Kelantan State Executive Council (Planning, Finance and Public Administration : 3 December 1999 – 7 April 2004) (Public Administration, Local Government and Housing : 8 April 2004 – 18 March 2008) (Local Government, Tourism and Culture : 19 March 2008 – 8 May 2013)
- In office 3 December 1999 – 8 May 2013
- Monarchs: Ismail Petra (1999–2010); Muhammad V (2010–2013)
- Menteri Besar: Nik Abdul Aziz Nik Mat
- Deputy: Abdullah Ya'kub (2010–2013); Zainuddin Awang Hamat (2010–2013)
- Preceded by: Halim Mohamad
- Succeeded by: Abdul Fattah Mahmood (Local Government); Md. Anizam Ab. Rahman (Tourism and Culture)
- Constituency: Bunut Payong

Secretary-General of the Malaysian Islamic Party
- Incumbent
- Assumed office 21 June 2015
- President: Abdul Hadi Awang
- Spiritual Leader: Nik Abdul Aziz Nik Mat; Hashim Jasin
- Deputy: Khairul Faizi Ahmad Kamil; Khairul Fahmi Mat Som
- Preceded by: Mustafa Ali

Member of the Malaysian Parliament for Kota Bharu
- Incumbent
- Assumed office 5 May 2013
- Preceded by: Wan Abdul Rahim Wan Abdullah (PAS)
- Majority: 15,970 (2013); 5,869 (2018); 22,613 (2022)

Member of the Kelantan State Legislative Assembly for Bunut Payong
- In office 29 November 1999 – 5 May 2013
- Preceded by: Halim Mohamad (PAS)
- Succeeded by: Ramli Mamat (PAS)
- Majority: 5,538 (1999); 1,931 (2004); 4,341 (2008)

Faction represented in Dewan Rakyat
- 2013–2020: Malaysian Islamic Party
- 2020–: Perikatan Nasional

Faction represented in Kelantan State Legislative Assembly
- 1999–2013: Malaysian Islamic Party

Personal details
- Born: Takiyuddin bin Haji Hassan; 24 November 1961 (age 64) Kampung Kemelong, Sik, Kedah, Federation of Malaya (now Malaysia)
- Citizenship: Malaysian
- Party: Malaysian Islamic Party (PAS) (1989–present)
- Other political affiliations: Angkatan Perpaduan Ummah (APU) (1990–1996); Barisan Alternatif (BA) (1999–2004); Pakatan Rakyat (PR) (2008–2015); Gagasan Sejahtera (GS) (2016–2020); Muafakat Nasional (MN) (2019–2022); Perikatan Nasional (PN) (2020–present)
- Spouse: Hariza Yusoff
- Education: University of Malaya
- Occupation: Politician, lawyer

Takiyuddin bin Hassan (Jawi: تقي الدين بن حاج حسن; born 24 November 1961) is a Malaysian politician and lawyer from the Malaysian Islamic Party (PAS), a component party of the Perikatan Nasional (PN) coalition who has served as the Member of Parliament (MP) for Kota Bharu since May 2013. He served as the Minister of Energy and Natural Resources in the Barisan Nasional (BN) administration under former Prime Minister Ismail Sabri Yaakob from August 2021 to the collapse of the BN administration in November 2022, the Minister in the Prime Minister's Department in charge of Parliament and Law in the PN administration under Prime Minister Muhyiddin Yassin from March 2020 to the collapse of the PN administration in August 2021. In addition, he has served as the Secretary-General of PAS since June 2015 and Chief Whip of PN and PAS in the Dewan Rakyat and was the only member of the Public Accounts Committee from PAS.

== Education ==
Takiyuddin bin Hassan was born at Kampung Kemelong, Sik, Kedah, Malaysia on 24 November 1961. He graduated from the University of Malaya with a Bachelor of Laws (LLB).

== Election results ==
Kelantan State Legislative Assembly
Year	Constituency	Candidate	Votes	Pct	Opponent(s)	Votes	Pct	Ballots cast	Majority	Turnout
1999	N09 Bunut Payong	Takiyuddin Hassan (PAS)	9,362	70.26%	Ahmad Rastom Ahmad Maher (UMNO)	3,824	26.70%	13,325	5,538	72.70%
2004	N10 Bunut Payong	Takiyuddin Hassan (PAS)	8,340	55.54%	Sekh Mohd Ruzi Sekh Ahamad (UMNO)	6,409	42.68%	15,017	1,931	77.61%
2008	N10 Bunut Payong	Takiyuddin Hassan (PAS)	10,360	62.69%	Rosmadi Ismail (UMNO)	6,019	36.42%	16,525	4,341	79.88%

Parliament of Malaysia
Year	Constituency	Candidate	Votes	Pct	Opponent(s)	Votes	Pct	Ballots cast	Majority	Turnout
2013	P021 Kota Bharu	Takiyuddin Hassan (PAS)	40,620	62.09%	Mohd Fatmi Che Salleh (UMNO)	24,650	37.68%	66,277	15,970	81.55%
2013	P021 Kota Bharu	Takiyuddin Hassan (PAS)	40,620	62.09%	Mohd Zakiman Abu Bakar (IND)	148	0.23%	66,277	15,970	81.55%
2018	P021 Kota Bharu	Takiyuddin Hassan (PAS)	28,291	42.24%	Husam Musa (AMANAH)	22,422	33.48%	68,306	5,869	77.00%
2018	P021 Kota Bharu	Takiyuddin Hassan (PAS)	28,291	42.24%	Fikhran Hamshi Mohd Fatmi (UMNO)	16,256	24.27%	68,306	5,869	77.00%
2022	P021 Kota Bharu	Takiyuddin Hassan (PAS)	41,869	53.67%	Hafidzah Mustakim (AMANAH)	19,256	24.68%	79,028	22,613	67.58%
2022	P021 Kota Bharu	Takiyuddin Hassan (PAS)	41,869	53.67%	Rosmadi Ismail (UMNO)	16,168	20.72%	79,028	22,613	67.58%
2022	P021 Kota Bharu	Takiyuddin Hassan (PAS)	41,869	53.67%	Che Musa Che Omar (PUTRA)	528	0.68%	79,028	22,613	67.58%
2022	P021 Kota Bharu	Takiyuddin Hassan (PAS)	41,869	53.67%	Andy Tan @ Awang (PRM)	107	0.14%	79,028	22,613	67.58%
2022	P021 Kota Bharu	Takiyuddin Hassan (PAS)	41,869	53.67%	Izat Bukhary (IND)	91	0.12%	79,028	22,613	67.58%

== Honours ==
=== Honours of Malaysia ===
- Malaysia
  - Recipient of the 17th Yang di-Pertuan Agong Installation Medal (2024)
- Federal Territory (Malaysia)
  - Grand Commander of the Order of the Territorial Crown (SMW) – Datuk Seri (2021)
- Kelantan
  - Knight Grand Commander of the Order of the Life of the Crown of Kelantan (SJMK) – Dato' (2018)
  - Knight Commander of the Order of the Life of the Crown of Kelantan (DJMK) – Dato' (2007)

== See also ==
- Kota Bharu (federal constituency)
