= Shaari Mat Yaman =

Malaysian politician

Yang Berhormat Tuan Shaari Mat Yaman SMK MLA

Member of the Kelantan State Legislative Assembly for Bunut Payong
- Incumbent
- Assumed office 12 August 2023
- Preceded by: Ramli Mamat (PR–PAS)
- Majority: 5,610 (2023)

Personal details
- Born: Shaari bin Mat Yaman Kelantan, Malaysia
- Party: Malaysian Islamic Party (PAS)
- Other political affiliations: Perikatan Nasional (PN)
- Occupation: Politician

Shaari Mat Yaman is a Malaysian politician who served as Member of the Kelantan State Legislative Assembly (MLA) for Bunut Payong since August 2023. He is a member of Malaysian Islamic Party (PAS), a component party of Perikatan Nasional (PN).

== Election results ==
Kelantan State Legislative Assembly
Year	Constituency	Candidate	Votes	Pct	Opponent(s)	Votes	Pct	Ballots cast	Majority	Turnout
2023	N10 Bunut Payong	Shaari Mat Yaman (PAS)	13,887	62.66%	Mohamed Hasnan Che Hussin (UMNO)	8,277	37.34%	22,278	5,610	60.62%

== Honours ==
- Kelantan
  - Recipient of the Crown of Kelantan Decoration (SMK) (2025)
