= Rohani Ibrahim =

Malaysian politician

Yang Berhormat Dato' Rohani Ibrahim DJMK JMK SMK MLA
- روحاني إبراهيم

Member of the Kelantan State Executive Council
- Incumbent
- Assumed office 15 August 2023
- Monarch: Muhammad V
- Menteri Besar: Mohd Nassuruddin Daud
- Portfolio: Welfare, Woman and Family Development
- Preceded by: Mumtaz Md Nawi
- Constituency: Tanjong Mas

Deputy Member of the Kelantan State Executive Council
- In office 17 May 2018 – 15 August 2023
- Monarch: Muhammad V
- Menteri Besar: Ahmad Yakob
- Portfolio: Welfare, Woman and Family Development
- Preceded by: position established
- Succeeded by: Nor Asilah Mohamed Zin
- Constituency: Tanjong Mas
- In office 2010–2013
- Monarchs: Ismail Petra; Muhammad V
- Menteri Besar: Nik Abdul Aziz Nik Mat
- Portfolio: Woman Development, Family and Health
- Preceded by: position established
- Succeeded by: position obolished
- Constituency: Tanjong Mas

Member of the Kelantan State Legislative Assembly for Tanjong Mas
- Incumbent
- Assumed office 21 March 2004
- Preceded by: Wan Abdul Rahim Wan Abdullah (BA–PAS)
- Majority: 2,789 (2004); 6,112 (2008); 8,521 (2013); 7,015 (2018); 8,593 (2023)

Faction represented in Kelantan State Legislative Assembly
- 2004–2020: Malaysian Islamic Party
- 2020–: Perikatan Nasional

Personal details
- Born: Rohani binti Ibrahim; 9 February 1965 (age 61) Kelantan, Malaysia
- Citizenship: Malaysian
- Party: Malaysian Islamic Party (PAS)
- Other political affiliations: Barisan Alternatif (BA) (1999–2004); Pakatan Rakyat (PR) (2008–2015); Gagasan Sejahtera (GS) (2016–2020); Muafakat Nasional (MN); Perikatan Nasional (PN) (2020–present)
- Spouse: Fauzi Hassan
- Occupation: Politician

Rohani binti Ibrahim (born 9 February 1965) is a Malaysian politician who is serving as a Member of the Kelantan State Executive Council (EXCO) under the current Menteri Besar, Mohd. Nassuruddin Daud. She has served as the Member of the Kelantan State Legislative Assembly (MLA) for Tanjong Mas since 2004. She is a member of the Malaysian Islamic Party (PAS), a component party of the ruling Perikatan Nasional (PN) coalition.

== Election results ==
Kelantan State Legislative Assembly
Year	Constituency	Candidate	Votes	Pct	Opponent(s)	Votes	Pct	Ballots cast	Majority	Turnout
2004	N08 Tanjong Mas	Rohani Ibrahim (PAS)	8,015	60.53%	Che Mansor Adabi Che Hassan (UMNO)	5,226	39.47%	13,375	2,789	77.43%
2008	N08 Tanjong Mas	Rohani Ibrahim (PAS)	11,095	69.01%	Khazuni Othman (UMNO)	4,983	30.99%	16,273	6,112	79.24%
2013	N08 Tanjong Mas	Rohani Ibrahim (PAS)	15,387	69.15%	Kanidy Omar (UMNO)	6,866	30.85%	22,451	8,521	81.80%
2018	N08 Tanjong Mas	Rohani Ibrahim (PAS)	13,154	54.27%	Hafidzah Mustakim (AMANAH)	6,139	25.33%	24,795	7,015	77.20%
2018	N08 Tanjong Mas	Rohani Ibrahim (PAS)	13,154	54.27%	Madihah Ab Aziz (UMNO)	4,945	20.40%	24,795	7,015	77.20%
2023	N08 Tanjong Mas	Rohani Ibrahim (PAS)	17,529	66.23%	Zinda Khalil Sastro Hassan (PKR)	8,936	33.77%	26,610	8,593	58.52%

== Honours ==
- Kelantan
  - Knight Commander of the Order of the Life of the Crown of Kelantan (DJMK) – Dato' (2025)
  - Companion of the Order of the Life of the Crown of Kelantan (JMK)
  - Recipient of the Crown of Kelantan Decoration (SMK)
