= Anuar Tan Abdullah =

Malaysian politician

Yang Berbahagia Dato' Anuar Tan Abdullah DJMK
- 陈升顿 / أنوار تان عبدﷲ

Member of the Kelantan State Executive Council (Racial Relationship, Tourism, Environment and Health : 3 December 1999–22 March 2004) (Arts, Tourism and National Unity : 23 March 2004–18 March 2008) (Entrepreneur Development, Trade and Community Unity : 19 March 2008–7 May 2013) (Industry, Trade and Community Unity : 8 May 2013–9 May 2018)
- In office 3 December 1999 – 9 May 2018
- Monarchs: Ismail Petra (1999–2013); Muhammad V (2010–2018)
- Menteri Besar: Nik Abdul Aziz Nik Mat (1999–2013); Ahmad Yakob (2013–2018)
- Deputy: Zulkifli Mamat (2010–2013)
- Preceded by: Hassan Muhamad (Racial Relationship); Abdullah Ya'kub (Tourism); Hassan Abdullah (Health)
- Succeeded by: Hanifa Ahmad (Industry and Trade); Md. Anizam Ab. Rahman (Community Unity)
- Constituency: Kota Lama

Member of the Kelantan State Legislative Assembly for Kota Lama
- In office 29 November 1999 – 12 August 2023
- Preceded by: Leong Su Siang (BN–MCA)
- Succeeded by: Hafidzah Mustakim (PH–AMANAH)
- Majority: 445 (1999); 34 (2004); 5,206 (2008); 6,618 (2013); 1,445 (2018)

Personal details
- Born: Tan Teng Loon Kelantan, Malaysia
- Citizenship: Malaysian
- Party: Parti Gerakan Rakyat Malaysia (GERAKAN) (1980–1998); Malaysian Islamic Party (PAS) (since 1999)
- Other political affiliations: Perikatan Nasional (PN); Muafakat Nasional (MN); Gagasan Sejahtera (GS); Pakatan Rakyat (PR); Barisan Alternatif (BA)
- Occupation: Politician

Anuar Tan bin Abdullah is a Malaysian politician who served as Member of the Kelantan State Executive Council (EXCO) from December 1999 to May 2018 and Member of the Kelantan State Legislative Assembly (MLA) for Kota Lama from November 1999 to August 2023. He is a member of the Malaysian Islamic Party (PAS), a component party of the Perikatan Nasional (PN) coalition. He was also the sole Kelantan MLA of Chinese ethnicity. He is a Chinese Muslim and the longest-serving Kota Lama MLA, serving for 24 years.

== Election results ==
Kelantan State Legislative Assembly
Year	Constituency	Candidate	Votes	Pct	Opponent(s)	Votes	Pct	Ballots cast	Majority	Turnout
1999	N08 Kota Lama	Anuar Tan Abdullah (PAS)	8,470	51.35%	Leong Su Siang (MCA)	8,025	48.65%	16,865	445	68.85%
2004	N09 Kota Lama	Anuar Tan Abdullah (PAS)	9,154	50.09%	Leong Su Siang (MCA)	9,120	49.91%	18,543	34	74.81%
2008	N09 Kota Lama	Anuar Tan Abdullah (PAS)	12,867	62.68%	Tan Ken Ten (MCA)	7,661	37.32%	20,804	5,206	76.94%
2013	N09 Kota Lama	Anuar Tan Abdullah (PAS)	14,269	64.65%	Tan Ken Ten (MCA)	7,651	34.66%	22,399	6,618	79.29%
2013	N09 Kota Lama	Anuar Tan Abdullah (PAS)	14,269	64.65%	Mohd Zakiman Abu Bakar (IND)	152	0.69%	22,399	6,618	79.29%
2018	N09 Kota Lama	Anuar Tan Abdullah (PAS)	8,410	40.12%	Ab. Rashid Ab. Rahman (BERSATU)	6,965	33.23%	21,367	1,445	75.89%
2018	N09 Kota Lama	Anuar Tan Abdullah (PAS)	8,410	40.12%	Chua Hock Kuan (MCA)	5,502	26.25%	21,367	1,445	75.89%
2018	N09 Kota Lama	Anuar Tan Abdullah (PAS)	8,410	40.12%	Khairul Nizam Abd Ghani (PSM)	54	0.26%	21,367	1,445	75.89%
2018	N09 Kota Lama	Anuar Tan Abdullah (PAS)	8,410	40.12%	Izat Bukhary Ismail Bukhary (IND)	29	0.14%	21,367	1,445	75.89%

== Honours ==
- Kelantan
  - Knight Commander of the Order of the Life of the Crown of Kelantan (DJMK) – Dato' (2003)
