= Hafidzah Mustakim =

Malaysian politician

Yang Berhormat Hafidzah Mustakim MLA
- حفيظة مستقيم

Member of the Kelantan State Legislative Assembly for Kota Lama
- Incumbent
- Assumed office 12 August 2023
- Preceded by: Anuar Tan Abdullah (PAS)
- Majority: 202 (2023)

Vice Women Chief I of the National Trust Party
- Incumbent
- Assumed office 22 December 2023 Serving with Salmee Said (Vice Women Chief II) & Kamaliah Noordin (Vice Women Chief III)
- President: Mohamad Sabu
- Women Chief: Aiman Athirah Sabu

Personal details
- Born: Kelantan, Malaysia
- Citizenship: Malaysian
- Party: National Trust Party (AMANAH)
- Other political affiliations: Pakatan Harapan (PH)
- Spouse: Che Rahimi Samat
- Children: 8
- Education: Monash University (MBBS)
- Occupation: Politician
- Profession: Doctor

Hafidzah binti Mustakim is a Malaysian politician and doctor who has served as Member of the Kelantan State Legislative Assembly (MLA) for Kota Lama since August 2023. She is a member of the National Trust Party (AMANAH), a component party of the Pakatan Harapan (PH) coalition. She is the first Kelantan PH MLA in the history of the state as she won the Kota Lama seat in the 2023 Kelantan state election. She has also served as the Vice Women Chief I of AMANAH since December 2023.

== Election results ==
Parliament of Malaysia
| Year | Constituency | Candidate | Votes | Pct | Opponent(s) | Votes | Pct | Ballots cast | Majority | Turnout |
|---|---|---|---|---|---|---|---|---|---|---|
| 2022 | P021 Kota Bharu | Hafidzah Mustakim (AMANAH) | 19,256 | 24.68% | Takiyuddin Hassan (PAS) | 41,869 | 53.67% | 79,028 | 22,613 | 67.58% |
| 2022 | P021 Kota Bharu | Hafidzah Mustakim (AMANAH) | 19,256 | 24.68% | Rosmadi Ismail (UMNO) | 16,168 | 20.72% | 79,028 | 22,613 | 67.58% |
| 2022 | P021 Kota Bharu | Hafidzah Mustakim (AMANAH) | 19,256 | 24.68% | Che Musa Che Omar (PUTRA) | 528 | 0.68% | 79,028 | 22,613 | 67.58% |
| 2022 | P021 Kota Bharu | Hafidzah Mustakim (AMANAH) | 19,256 | 24.68% | Andy Tan @ Awang (PRM) | 107 | 0.14% | 79,028 | 22,613 | 67.58% |
| 2022 | P021 Kota Bharu | Hafidzah Mustakim (AMANAH) | 19,256 | 24.68% | Izat Bukhary (IND) | 91 | 0.12% | 79,028 | 22,613 | 67.58% |

Kelantan State Legislative Assembly
| Year | Constituency | Candidate | Votes | Pct | Opponent(s) | Votes | Pct | Ballots cast | Majority | Turnout |
|---|---|---|---|---|---|---|---|---|---|---|
| 2018 | N08 Tanjong Mas | Hafidzah Mustakim (AMANAH) | 6,139 | 25.33% | Rohani Ibrahim (PAS) | 13,154 | 54.27% | 24,795 | 7,015 | 77.20% |
| 2018 | N08 Tanjong Mas | Hafidzah Mustakim (AMANAH) | 6,139 | 25.33% | Madihah Ab Aziz (UMNO) | 4,945 | 20.40% | 24,795 | 7,015 | 77.20% |
| 2023 | N09 Kota Lama | Hafidzah Mustakim (AMANAH) | 9,691 | 49.98% | Zamri Ismail (PAS) | 9,489 | 48.94% | 19,583 | 202 | 59.27% |
| 2023 | N09 Kota Lama | Hafidzah Mustakim (AMANAH) | 9,691 | 49.98% | Andy Tan (PRM) | 126 | 0.65% | 19,583 | 202 | 59.27% |
| 2023 | N09 Kota Lama | Hafidzah Mustakim (AMANAH) | 9,691 | 49.98% | Izat Bukhary Ismail Bukhary (IND) | 85 | 0.44% | 19,583 | 202 | 59.27% |
