= Tengku Ahmad Rithauddeen Ismail =

Malaysian politician (1928–2022)

Yang Mulia Tengku Sri Mara Raja Tan Sri Dato' Sri Tengku Ahmad Rithauddeen Ismail PMN SPMP SSAP PMK PCh
- تڠکو أحمد رضاءالدين تڠکو إسماعيل

Minister of Defence
- In office 20 May 1987 – 26 October 1990
- Monarchs: Iskandar; Azlan Shah
- Prime Minister: Mahathir Mohamad
- Deputy: Abang Abu Bakar Abang Mustapha
- Preceded by: Abdullah Ahmad Badawi
- Succeeded by: Najib Razak
- Constituency: Kota Bharu

Minister of Information
- In office 11 August 1986 – 20 May 1987
- Monarch: Iskandar
- Prime Minister: Mahathir Mohamad
- Deputy: Railey Jeffrey
- Preceded by: Rais Yatim
- Succeeded by: Mohamed Rahmat
- Constituency: Kota Bharu
- In office 5 September 1974 – 13 August 1975
- Monarch: Abdul Halim
- Prime Minister: Abdul Razak Hussein
- Deputy: Shariff Ahmad
- Preceded by: Ghazali Shafie
- Succeeded by: Abdul Taib Mahmud
- Constituency: Kota Bharu

Minister of Foreign Affairs
- In office 17 July 1984 – 10 August 1986
- Monarch: Iskandar
- Prime Minister: Mahathir Mohamad
- Deputy: Abdul Kadir Sheikh Fadzir
- Preceded by: Ghazali Shafie
- Succeeded by: Rais Yatim
- Constituency: Kota Bharu
- In office 13 August 1975 – 16 July 1981
- Monarchs: Abdul Halim; Yahya Petra; Ahmad Shah
- Prime Minister: Abdul Razak Hussein
- Deputy: Mokhtar Hashim (1979–1981)
- Preceded by: Abdul Razak Hussein
- Succeeded by: Ghazali Shafie
- Constituency: Kota Bharu

Minister of Trade and Industry
- In office 17 July 1981 – 17 July 1984
- Monarchs: Ahmad Shah; Iskandar
- Prime Minister: Mahathir Mohamad
- Deputy: Lew Sip Hoon (1981–1983); Shahrir Abdul Samad (1981–1983); Muhyiddin Yassin (1983–1984); Oo Gin Sun (1983–1984)
- Preceded by: Mahathir Mohamad
- Succeeded by: Tengku Razaleigh Hamzah
- Constituency: Kota Bharu (previously Kota Bharu Hilir)

Member of the Dewan Rakyat for Kota Bharu (previously Kota Bharu Hilir)
- In office 10 May 1969 – 20 October 1990
- Preceded by: Nik Ahmad Kamil Nik Mahmud (UMNO–Alliance)
- Succeeded by: Ilani Isahak (S46)
- Majority: 155 (1969); Unopposed (1974); 8,682 (1978); 7,970 (1982); 5,033 (1986)

Personal details
- Born: 24 January 1928 Kelantan, Unfederated Malay States, British Malaya (now Malaysia)
- Died: 29 April 2022 (aged 94) Jalan Duta, Kuala Lumpur, Malaysia
- Resting place: Bukit Kiara Muslim Cemetery, Kuala Lumpur
- Party: United Malays National Organisation
- Relations: Raja Perempuan Budriah and Tengku Noor Zakiah (sisters); Sirajuddin of Perlis (nephew)
- Parents: Tengku Ismail Tengku Nik Haji (father); Tengku Besar Zabedah (mother)
- Education: University of Nottingham

Tengku Ahmad Rithauddeen bin Tengku Ismail (Jawi: تڠکو أحمد رضاءالدين بن تڠکو إسماعيل; 24 January 1928 – 29 April 2022) was a Malaysian politician and barrister who formerly served as chairman of the UMNO disciplinary board. He previously served as Minister of Defence, Minister of International Trade and Industry and Minister of Foreign Affairs. He was Kota Bharu Member of Parliament for five terms before losing his seat in the 1990 General Election to the Semangat 46 candidate. He was a royal prince of the Kelatan Royal Family and a grandson of the last Sultan of Pattani, Sultan Abdul Kadir Kamarudin Syah. After the throne was overthrown by the Siamese, the Sultan of Pattani was exiled to Kelantan and married Tengku Kembang Petri Binti Sultan Ahmad. He was also among few Malaysians awarded the Grand Cordon of the Order of the Rising Sun from Japanese Emperor in 2018, credited with strengthening Malaysian-Japanese relationship. He was also vocal in Malaysian politics, voicing several issues in regards to the post-BN social concerns.

== Death ==
Tengku Ahmad Rithauddeen died on 29 April 2022 at his residence in Jalan Duta, aged 94. He was buried at Bukit Kiara Muslim Cemetery in Kuala Lumpur.

== Election results ==
Parliament of Malaysia
Year	Constituency	Candidate	Votes	Pct	Opponent(s)	Votes	Pct	Ballots cast	Majority	Turnout
1969	P018 Kota Bharu Hilir	Tengku Ahmad Rithauddeen Ismail (UMNO)	13,069	50.30%	Wan Hashim Wan Ahmad (PMIP)	12,914	49.70%	26,739	155	67.73%
1974	P019 Kota Bharu	Tengku Ahmad Rithauddeen Ismail (UMNO)	Unopposed							
1978	P019 Kota Bharu	Tengku Ahmad Rithauddeen Ismail (UMNO)	18,136	65.73%	Lah (PAS)	9,454	34.27%		8,682	
1982	P019 Kota Bharu	Tengku Ahmad Rithauddeen Ismail (UMNO)	21,424	58.26%	Salehudin Abdullah (PAS)	13,454	36.59%	37,558	7,970	74.76%
1982	P019 Kota Bharu	Tengku Ahmad Rithauddeen Ismail (UMNO)	21,424	58.26%	Kang Sam Chuan (DAP)	1,896	5.16%	37,558	7,970	74.76%
1986	P019 Kota Bharu	Tengku Ahmad Rithauddeen Ismail (UMNO)	20,310	57.07%	Hassan Abdullah (PAS)	15,277	42.93%	36,282	5,033	68.96%
1990	P019 Kota Bharu	Tengku Ahmad Rithauddeen Ismail (UMNO)	12,106	30.14%	Ilani Isahak (S46)	27,566	68.61%	41,254	15,460	73.35%
1990	P019 Kota Bharu	Tengku Ahmad Rithauddeen Ismail (UMNO)	12,106	30.14%	Saifuddin Daud (IND)	503	1.25%	41,254	15,460	73.35%

== Honours ==
=== Honours of Malaysia ===
- Malaysia
  - Commander of the Order of the Defender of the Realm (PMN) – Tan Sri (1991)
- Kelantan
  - Order for Kerabat Titleholders – Tengku Sri Mara Raja (1966)
  - Commander of the Order of the Crown of Kelantan (PMK) (1964)
- Pahang
  - Grand Knight of the Order of Sultan Ahmad Shah of Pahang (SSAP) – Dato' Sri (1981)
- Perlis
  - Knight Grand Commander of the Order of the Crown of Perlis (SPMP) – Dato' Seri (1976)

=== Foreign honours ===
- Japan
  - Grand Cordon of the Order of the Rising Sun (2018)
- Thailand
  - Knight Grand Cross (First Class) of the Order of the White Elephant (PCh) (1988)
