= 2010 Hulu Selangor by-election =

Election in Malaysia

← 2008	25 April 2010	2013 →

Hulu Selangor seat in the Dewan Rakyat
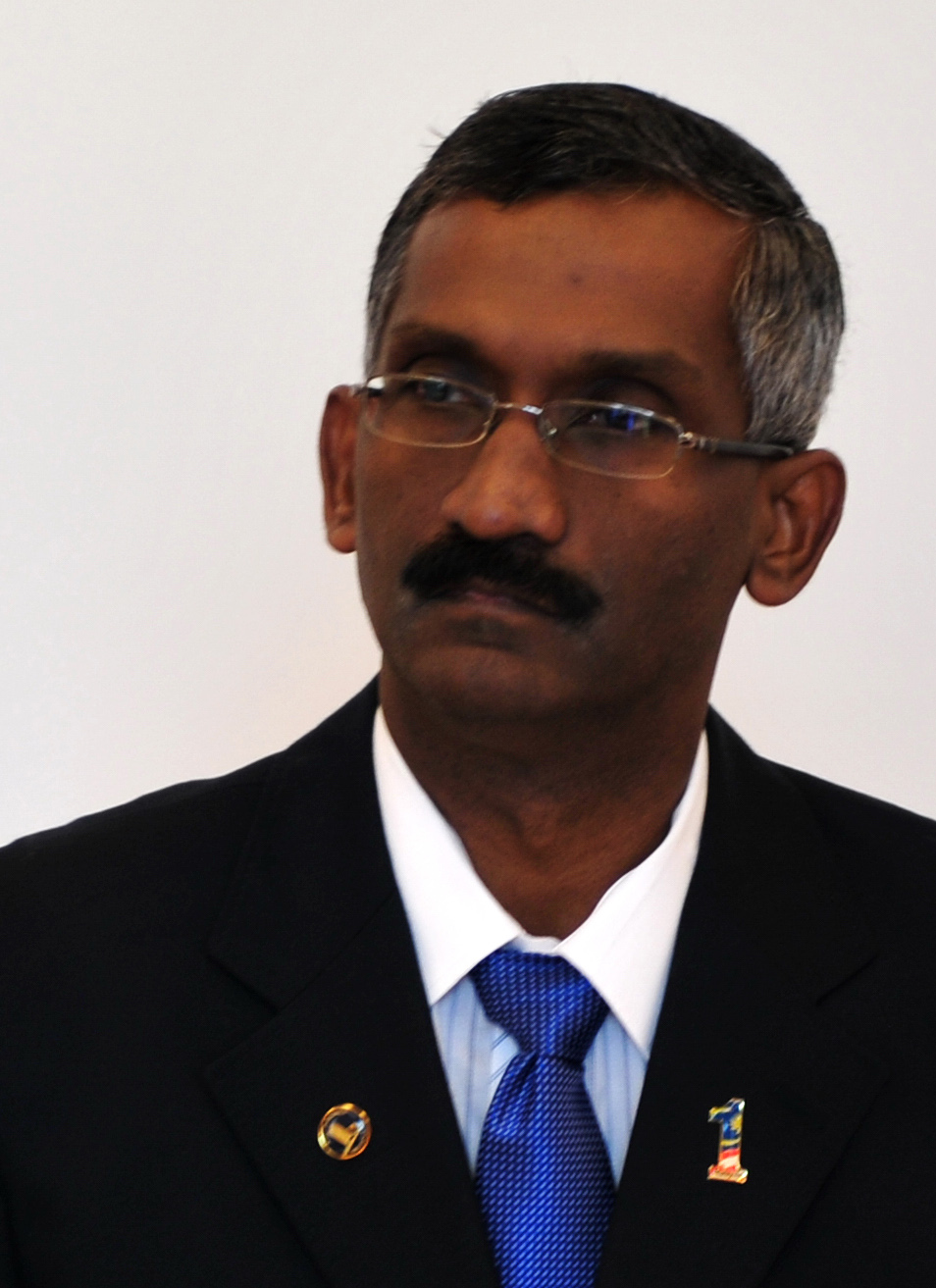
		PKR
Candidate	P. Kamalanathan	Zaid Ibrahim
Party	BN (MIC)	PKR
Alliance		PR
Popular vote	24,997	23,272
Percentage	51.79%	48.21%
Hulu Selangor MP before election
Zainal Abidin Ahmad
PKR
Elected Hulu Selangor MP
P. Kamalanathan
BN (MIC)

The 2010 Hulu Selangor by-election is a by-election for the Dewan Rakyat federal seat of Hulu Selangor, Malaysia that were held on 25 April 2010. It was called following the death of the incumbent, Zainal Abidin Ahmad on 25 March 2010.

== Background ==
Zainal Abidin Ahmad, a candidate of Parti Keadilan Rakyat (PKR) were first elected to the federal seat of Hulu Selangor at the 2008 Malaysian general election, defeating 3-term incumbent from Barisan Nasional (BN), G. Palanivel. A former United Malays National Organisation (UMNO) member before joining PKR in 2005, Zainal Abidin were the assemblyman for Dusun Tua in the Selangor State Legislative Assembly for 3-terms from 1990 to 2004, and were the Deputy Menteri Besar of Selangor from 1999 to 2004.

On 25 March 2010, Zainal Abidin died at his house in Kajang, because of brain cancer. His death means that his Hulu Selangor federal seat were vacated. This necessitates for a by-election to be held, as the seat were vacated more that 2 years before the expiry of the Dewan Rakyat current term. Election Commission of Malaysia (SPR) announced that the by-election will be held on 25 April 2010, with 17 April 2010 set as the nomination day.

== Nomination and campaign ==
As the seat was formerly won by BN's component party Malaysian Indian Congress (MIC) since 1986, usually the candidate would come from MIC. After the news of Zainal's death, Palanivel, the former incumbent for the seat and MIC deputy president were being announced by MIC president Samy Vellu as their candidate. However, after several discussions involving MIC and UMNO, including naming MIC Youth vice-chief V. Mugilan, BN nominated P. Kamalanathan, MIC information chief and public relations director for Serba Wangi Sdn Bhd as their candidate. PKR meanwhile nominated Zaid Ibrahim, a former UMNO member and member of Parliament for Kota Bharu from 2004 to 2008. A lawyer that formerly owned his own law firm Zaid Ibrahim & Co, Zaid were also Minister in the Prime Minister's Department from March 2008 before resigning only 3 months later and sacked from UMNO. He joined PKR in 2009.

After nomination closed, it was confirmed there will be a straight fight between BN and PKR for the Hulu Selangor seat. There were 2 independent candidate nominations that were accepted by SPR on nomination day, but the candidates withdrew before the nomination deadline, 2 days later.

== Timeline ==
The key dates are listed below.

Date	Event
	Issue of the Writ of Election
17 April 2010	Nomination Day
17 - 24 April 2010	Campaigning Period
	Early polling day for postal and overseas voters
25 April 2010	Polling Day

== Results ==
Malaysian general by-election, 25 April 2010: Hulu Selangor Upon the death of incumbent, Zainal Abidin Ahmad
Party	Candidate	Votes	%	∆%
BN	P. Kamalanathan	24,997	51.79	▲2.00
PKR	Mohd Zaid Ibrahim	23,272	48.21	▼2.00
Total valid votes		48,269	100.00	
Total rejected ballots		731		
Unreturned ballots		67		
Turnout		49,067	76.07	▲0.83
Registered electors		64,500		
Majority		1,725	3.58	▲3.16
BN gain from PKR		Swing		?
Source(s) "Pilihan Raya Kecil P.094 Hulu Selangor". Election Commission of Malaysia. Archived from the original on 2018-09-19.

=== Previous result ===
Malaysian general election, 2008: Hulu Selangor
Party	Candidate	Votes	%	∆%
PKR	Zainal Abidin Ahmad	23,177	50.21	▲50.21
BN	G. Palanivel	22,979	49.79	▼17.82
Total valid votes		46,156	100.00	
Total rejected ballots		1,466		
Unreturned ballots		223		
Turnout		47,845	75.24	▲2.47
Registered electors		63,593		
Majority		198	0.42	▼34.80
PKR gain from BN		Swing		?
