= Kota Lama =

Political subdivision in Malaysia

Kota Lama (N09)
Kelantan constituency

State constituency
- Legislature: Kelantan State Legislative Assembly
MLA
Hafidzah Mustakim
PH
- Constituency created: 1994
- First contested: 1995
- Last contested: 2023

Demographics
- Electors (2023): 33,043

Kota Lama is a state constituency in Kelantan, Malaysia, that has been represented in the Kelantan State Legislative Assembly.

The state constituency was first contested in 1995 and is mandated to return a single Assemblyman to the Kelantan State Legislative Assembly under the first-past-the-post voting system.

== Demographics ==
As of 2020, Kota Lama has a population of 20,376 people.

From its creation, the Kota Lama constituency has the most Chinese voters compared to other constituency in Kelantan, which has a Malay-Muslim majority voters. Therefore usually Chinese candidates were selected by parties to contest the seat.

Ethnic breakdown of Kota Lama's electorate as of 2023
1. Malay (66.2%)
2. Chinese (31.0%)
3. Indian (1.51%)
4. Other ethnicities (1.35%)

== History ==
=== Polling districts ===
According to the Gazette issued on 30 March 2018, the Kota Lama constituency has a total of 12 polling districts.

State constituency	Polling districts	Code	Location
Kota Lama (N09）	Kubang Pasu	021/09/01	SMK Zainab 2
Kota Lama (N09）	Kelochor	021/09/02	SJK (C) Chung Cheng
Kota Lama (N09）	Kebun Sultan	021/09/03	SJK (C) Chung Hwa
Kota Lama (N09）	Merbau	021/09/04	SK Merbau
Kota Lama (N09）	Atas Banggol	021/09/05	SMJK Chung Hwa
Kota Lama (N09）	Jalan Pejabat Pos Lama	021/09/06	Maahadi Muhammadi (Perempuan)
Kota Lama (N09）	Bandar	021/09/07	SMJK Chung Cheng
Kota Lama (N09）	Padang Garong	021/09/08	SK Padang Garong 1
Kota Lama (N09）	Kota Lama	021/09/09	SK Kampung Sireh
Kota Lama (N09）	Islah Lama	021/09/10	SK Sri Bemban
Kota Lama (N09）	Kampung Dusun	021/09/11	SK Padang Garong 1
Kota Lama (N09）	Kubor Kuda	021/09/12	SK Kampung Sireh

=== Representation history ===
Members of the Legislative Assembly for Kota Lama
Assembly	No	Years	Member	Party
Constituency created from Padang Garong
9th	N08	1995–1999	Leong Su Siang (龙仕祥)	BN (MCA)
10th	N08	1999–2004	Anuar Tan Abdullah (陈升顿)	PAS
11th	N09	2004–2008	Anuar Tan Abdullah (陈升顿)	PAS
12th	N09	2008–2013	Anuar Tan Abdullah (陈升顿)	PR (PAS)
13th	N09	2013–2018	Anuar Tan Abdullah (陈升顿)	PR (PAS)
14th	N09	2018–2020	Anuar Tan Abdullah (陈升顿)	PAS
14th	N09	2020–2023	Anuar Tan Abdullah (陈升顿)	PN (PAS)
15th	N09	2023–present	Hafidzah Mustakim	PH (AMANAH)

== Election results ==
Kelantan state election, 2023: Kota Lama
Party	Candidate	Votes	%	∆%
PH	Hafidzah Mustakim	9,691	49.98	▲49.98
PAS	Zamri Ismail	9,489	48.94	▲8.82
Parti Rakyat Malaysia	Andy Tan	126	0.65	▲0.65
Independent	Izat Bukhary	85	0.44	▲0.30
Total valid votes		19,391	100.00	
Total rejected ballots		192		
Unreturned ballots		27		
Turnout		19,610	59.35	▼16.54
Registered electors		33,043		
Majority		202	1.04	▼5.85
PH gain from PAS		Swing		?

Kelantan state election, 2018: Kota Lama
Party	Candidate	Votes	%	∆%
PAS	Anuar Tan Abdullah	8,410	40.12	▼24.53
PKR	Ab. Rashid Ab. Rahman	6,965	33.23	▲33.23
BN	Chua Hock Kuan	5,502	26.25	▼8.41
Parti Sosialis Malaysia	Khairul Nizam Abd Ghani	54	0.26	▲0.26
Independent	Izat Bukhary Ismail Bukhary	29	0.14	▲0.14
Total valid votes		20,960	100.00	
Total rejected ballots		267		
Unreturned ballots		140		
Turnout		21,367	75.89	▼3.40
Registered electors		28,157		
Majority		1,445	6.89	▼23.10
PAS hold		Swing		

Kelantan state election, 2013: Kota Lama
Party	Candidate	Votes	%	∆%
PAS	Anuar Tan Abdullah	14,269	64.65	▲1.97
BN	Tan Ken Ten	7,651	34.66	▼2.66
Independent	Mohd Zakiman Abu Bakar	152	0.69	▲0.69
Total valid votes		22,072	100.00	
Total rejected ballots		275		
Unreturned ballots		52		
Turnout		22,399	79.29	▲2.35
Registered electors		28,248		
Majority		6,618	29.99	▲4.63
PAS hold		Swing		
Source(s) "Federal Government Gazette - Notice of Contested Election, State Legislative Assembly for the State of Kelantan [P.U. (B) 187/2013]" (PDF). Attorney General's Chambers of Malaysia. 26 April 2013. Archived from the original (PDF) on 2019-12-29. "Federal Government Gazette - Results of Contested Election and Statements of the Poll after the Official Addition of Votes, State Constituencies for the State of Kelantan [P.U. (B) 228/2013]" (PDF). Attorney General's Chambers of Malaysia. 22 May 2013. Archived from the original (PDF) on 2017-04-05.

Kelantan state election, 2008: Kota Lama
Party	Candidate	Votes	%	∆%
PAS	Anuar Tan Abdullah	12,867	62.68	▲12.59
BN	Tan Ken Ten	7,661	37.32	▼12.59
Total valid votes		20,528	100.00	
Total rejected ballots		276		
Unreturned ballots				
Turnout		20,804	76.94	▲2.13
Registered electors		27,038		
Majority		5,206	25.36	▲25.18
PAS hold		Swing		

Kelantan state election, 2004: Kota Lama
Party	Candidate	Votes	%	∆%
PAS	Anuar Tan Abdullah	9,154	50.09	▼1.26
BN	Leong Su Siang	9,120	49.91	▲1.26
Total valid votes		18,274	100.00	
Total rejected ballots		269		
Unreturned ballots		0		
Turnout		18,543	74.81	▲5.96
Registered electors		24,787		
Majority		34	0.18	▼2.52
PAS hold		Swing		

Kelantan state election, 1999: Kota Lama
Party	Candidate	Votes	%	∆%
PAS	Anuar Tan Abdullah	8,470	51.35	▲51.35
BN	Leong Su Siang	8,025	48.65	▼5.51
Total valid votes		16,495	100.00	
Total rejected ballots		298		
Unreturned ballots		72		
Turnout		16,865	68.85	▼0.89
Registered electors		24,495		
Majority		445	2.70	▼7.57
PAS gain from BN		Swing		?

Kelantan state election, 1995: Kota Lama
Party	Candidate	Votes	%
BN	Leong Su Siang	8,837	54.16
Pan-Malaysian Islamic Front	Mohd Yusoff Mohd Nor	7,161	43.89
Independent	Foo Chee Lian @ Foo Chee Tow	214	1.31
KITA	Mohd Din Nizamdin	104	0.64
Total valid votes		16,316	100.00
Total rejected ballots		336	
Unreturned ballots		124	
Turnout		16,776	69.74
Registered electors		24,054	
Majority		1,676	10.27
This was a new constituency created.
