= Kota Bharu Hilir (federal constituency) =

Former federal constituency in Malaysia

Kelantan constituency

Defunct federal constituency
- Legislature: Dewan Rakyat
- Constituency created: 1958
- Constituency abolished: 1974
- First contested: 1959
- Last contested: 1969

Kota Bharu Hilir was a federal constituency in Kelantan, Malaysia, that was represented in the Dewan Rakyat from 1959 to 1974.

The federal constituency was created in the 1974 redistribution and was mandated to return a single member to the Dewan Rakyat under the first past the post voting system.

== History ==
It was abolished in 1974 when it was redistributed.

=== Representation history ===
Members of Parliament for Kota Bharu Hilir
Parliament	Years	Member	Party	Vote Share
Constituency created from Kelantan Tengah
Parliament of the Federation of Malaya
1st	1959–1963	Ahmad Abdullah (احمد عبدالله)	PMIP	9,463; 60.03%
Parliament of Malaysia
1st	1963–1964	Ahmad Abdullah (احمد عبدالله)	PMIP	9,463; 60.03%
2nd	1964–1969	Nik Ahmad Kamil Nik Mahmud (نئ احمد كاميل نئ مهمود)	Alliance (UMNO)	11,585; 51.46%
	1969–1971	Parliament was suspended		
3rd	1971–1973	Tengku Ahmad Rithauddeen Tengku Ismail (تڠكو احمد ريتهاودديين تڠكو اسماعيل)	Alliance (UMNO)	13,069; 50.30%
3rd	1973–1974	Tengku Ahmad Rithauddeen Tengku Ismail (تڠكو احمد ريتهاودديين تڠكو اسماعيل)	BN (UMNO)	13,069; 50.30%
Constituency abolished, renamed to Kota Baharu

=== State constituency ===
Parliamentary constituency	State constituency						
Parliamentary constituency	1955–1959*	1959–1974	1974–1986	1986–1995	1995–2004	2004–2018	2018–present
Kota Bharu Hilir		Bandar Hilir					
Kota Bharu Hilir		Bandar Hulu					
Kota Bharu Hilir		Kota Bharu Tengah					

=== Historical boundaries ===
State Constituency	Area
State Constituency	1959
Bandar Hilir	Kampung Paya Purnama; Kota Bharu; Kubang Pasu; Langgar; Padang Garong
Bandar Hulu	Bunut Payong; Kampung Dusun; Kampung Langgar; Kampung Kota; Telipot
Kota Bharu Tengah	Kampung Wakaf Stan; Kubang Kerian; Pasir Hor; Pasir Tumboh; Wakaf Che Yeh

== Election results ==
Malaysian general election, 1969
Party	Candidate	Votes	%	∆%
Alliance	Tengku Ahmad Rithauddeen Tengku Ismail	13,069	50.30	▼1.16
PMIP	Wan Hashim Wan Ahmad	12,914	49.70	▲1.16
Total valid votes		25,983	100.00	
Total rejected ballots		756		
Unreturned ballots		0		
Turnout		26,739	67.73	▼7.62
Registered electors		39,478		
Majority		155	▼9.74	
Alliance hold		Swing		

Malaysian general election, 1964
Party	Candidate	Votes	%	∆%
Alliance	Nik Ahmad Kamil Nik Mahmud	11,585	51.46	▼8.57
PMIP	Wan Mustapha Ali	10,929	48.54	▲8.57
Total valid votes		22,514	100.00	
Total rejected ballots		802		
Unreturned ballots		0		
Turnout		23,316	75.35	▼9.74
Registered electors		30,942		
Majority		656	2.92	▼17.74
Alliance gain from National Trust Party (Malaysia)-Malayan Islamic Party		Swing		?

Malayan general election, 1959
Party	Candidate	Votes	%
PMIP	Ahmad Abdullah	9,463	60.03
Alliance	Nik Ismail Nik Hussin	6,302	39.97
Total valid votes		15,765	100.00
Total rejected ballots		97	
Unreturned ballots		0	
Turnout		15,862	65.61
Registered electors		24,178	
Majority		3,161	20.66
This was a new constituency created.
