= P. Kamalanathan =

Malaysian politician (born 1965)

Yang Berbahagia Dato' Kamalanathan Panchanathan DPMK PMW KMN APR
- பி.கமலநாதன்
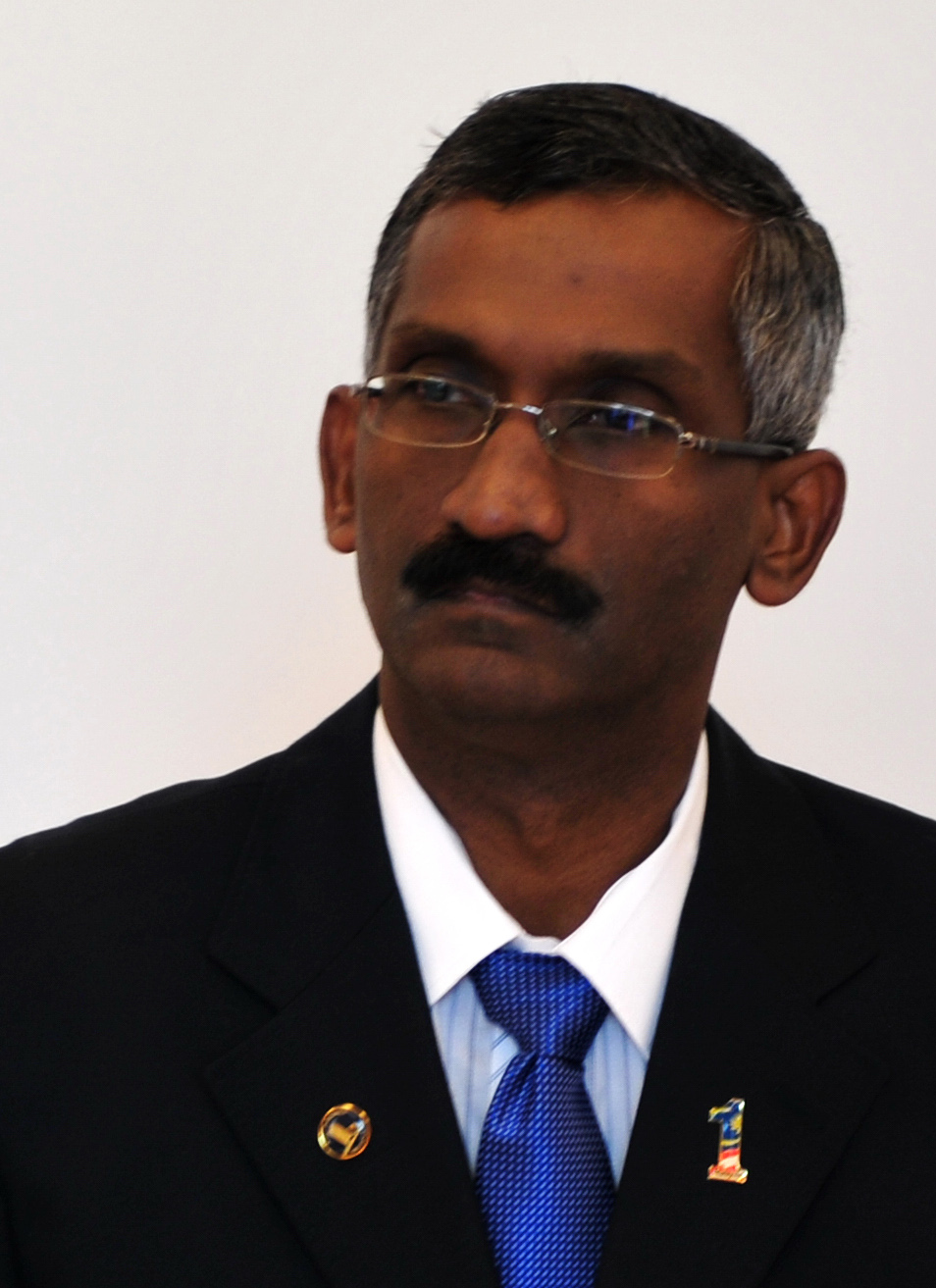
- P. Kamalanathan (2014)

Deputy Minister of Education I
- In office 16 May 2013 – 9 May 2018 Serving with Mary Yap Kain Ching (Deputy Minister of Education II) (2013–2015); Chong Sin Woon (2015–2018)
- Monarchs: Abdul Halim; Muhammad V
- Prime Minister: Najib Razak
- Minister: Muhyiddin Yassin (Minister of Education I) (2013–2015); Idris Jusoh (Minister of Education II) (2013–2015); Mahdzir Khalid (Minister of Education) (2015–2018)
- Constituency: Hulu Selangor

Member of the Malaysian Parliament for Hulu Selangor
- In office 25 April 2010 – 9 May 2018
- Preceded by: Zainal Abidin Ahmad (PR–PKR)
- Succeeded by: June Leow Hsiad Hui (PH–PKR)
- Majority: 1,725 (2010); 3,414 (2013)

Faction represented in Dewan Rakyat
- 2010–2018: Barisan Nasional

Personal details
- Born: Kamalanathan s/o Panchanathan; 18 October 1965 (age 60) Sentul, Kuala Lumpur, Malaysia
- Party: Malaysian Indian Congress (MIC)
- Other political affiliations: Barisan Nasional (BN)
- Spouse: Shobana Subramaniam
- Occupation: Politician
- Profession: Public relations practitioner
- Website: www.pkamalanathan.com

Kamalanathan s/o Panchanathan (Tamil: பி.கமலநாதன், romanized: Pi.Kamalanātaṉ; born 18 October 1965) is a Malaysian politician. He is a member of the Malaysian Indian Congress (MIC) in the Barisan Nasional (BN) coalition. He was the former Member of the Parliament of Malaysia for the seat of Hulu Selangor and former Deputy Minister of Education I.

== Political career ==
P. Kamalanathan was elected to Parliament in a 2010 Hulu Selangor by-election after the death of the incumbent member Zainal Abidin Ahmad. The by-election saw the seat shift from Zainal's opposition People's Justice Party (PKR) to the Barisan Nasional. The MIC had sought to field veteran politician and defeated former Hulu Selangor Member of Parliament Palanivel Govindasamy, but Barisan Nasional's leaders wanted a lesser-known winnable candidate.

On 16 May 2013, after winning the 2013 general election, P. Kamalanathan was appointed as Deputy Minister of Education and Higher Learning II under the new cabinet of Prime Minister Najib Razak. After a cabinet reshuffle by the Prime Minister Najib Razak on 28 July 2015, P Kamalanathan was promoted and appointed as the Deputy Minister of Education II. He is tri-lingual; English, Bahasa Melayu and Tamil.

In the 2018 general election, P. Kamalanathan failed to be re-elected to the parliament.

In 2024, P.Kamalanathan was elected as MIC's central working committee member

== Election results ==
Parliament of Malaysia
Year	Constituency	Candidate	Votes	Pct	Opponent(s)	Votes	Pct	Ballots cast	Majority	Turnout
2010	P094 Hulu Selangor	Kamalanathan Panchanathan (MIC)	24,997	51.79%	Zaid Ibrahim (PKR)	23,272	48.21%	49,067	1,725	76.07%
2013	P094 Hulu Selangor	Kamalanathan Panchanathan (MIC)	37,403	50.89%	Khalid Jaafar (PKR)	33,989	46.25%	75,113	3,414	87.65%
2013	P094 Hulu Selangor	Kamalanathan Panchanathan (MIC)	37,403	50.89%	Radzali Mokhtar (IND)	1,105	1.50%	75,113	3,414	87.65%
2013	P094 Hulu Selangor	Kamalanathan Panchanathan (MIC)	37,403	50.89%	Edmund Santhara (IND)	999	1.36%	75,113	3,414	87.65%
2018	P094 Hulu Selangor	Kamalanathan Panchanathan (MIC)	27,392	32.14%	June Leow Hsiad Hui (PKR)	40,783	47.86%	86,798	13,391	85.95%
2018	P094 Hulu Selangor	Kamalanathan Panchanathan (MIC)	27,392	32.14%	Wan Mat Sulaiman (PAS)	16,620	19.50%	86,798	13,391	85.95%
2018	P094 Hulu Selangor	Kamalanathan Panchanathan (MIC)	27,392	32.14%	Kumar Paramasivam (IND)	426	0.50%	86,798	13,391	85.95%
2022	P132 Port Dickson	Kamalanathan Panchanathan (MIC)	18,412	22.96%	Aminuddin Harun (PKR)	42,013	52.40%	80,185	23,601	78.00%
2022	P132 Port Dickson	Kamalanathan Panchanathan (MIC)	18,412	22.96%	Rafei Mustapha (PAS)	18,235	22.74%	80,185	23,601	78.00%
2022	P132 Port Dickson	Kamalanathan Panchanathan (MIC)	18,412	22.96%	Ahmad Idham Ahmad Nazri (PEJUANG)	1,084	1.35%	80,185	23,601	78.00%
2022	P132 Port Dickson	Kamalanathan Panchanathan (MIC)	18,412	22.96%	Abdul Rani Kulup Abdullah (IND)	441	0.35%	80,185	23,601	78.00%

== Honours ==
- Malaysia
  - Officer of the Order of the Defender of the Realm (KMN) (2010)
- Federal Territory (Malaysia)
  - Commander of the Order of the Territorial Crown (PMW) – Datuk (2016)
- Kedah
  - Knight Commander of the Order of the Crown of Kedah (DPMK) – Dato' (2016)

== See also ==
- Hulu Selangor (federal constituency)
