= Order of precedence in Kelantan =

Relative preeminence of officials for ceremonial purposes

The Kelantan order of precedence is a nominal and symbolic hierarchy of important positions within the state of Kelantan. It has no legal standing but is used to dictate ceremonial protocol at events of a state nature.

== Order of precedence ==
Order of precedence in Kelantan is as follows:

No.	Description
1	the Sultan
2	the Raja Perempuan/Sultanah
3	the Tengku Mahkota
4	the Tengku Ampuan Mahkota/Che Puan Mahkota
5	the Sultan's Mother
6	the Tengku Bendahara
7	the Sultan's children
8	the Menteri Besar
9	Members of the Most Esteemed Royal Family Order of Kelantan (DK)
10	the Tengku Temenggong
11	the Tengku Laksamana
12	the Tengku Panglima Raja
13	Deputy to the Menteri Besar
14	Judges of the High Court
15	Speaker of the Legislative Assembly
16	Former Menteri Besar
17	State Secretary
18	the Kerabat Bergelar
19	the Kerabat Terdekat
20	State Mufti
21	Chief Syarie Judge
22	the Kerabat
23	State Legal Adviser
24	State Financial Officer
25	Members of the Executive Council
26	Members of the Legislative Assembly
27	Chief of Ceremonies
28	the Dato' Bergelar
29	the Orang Besar Negeri
30	Knight Grand Commanders of the Most Illustrious Order of the Crown of Kelantan (SPMK)
31	Knight Grand Commanders of the Most Illustrious Order of the Life of the Crown of Kelantan (SJMK)
32	Knight Grand Commanders of the Most Distinguished Order of the Loyalty to the Crown of Kelantan (SPSK)
33	Knight Grand Commanders of the Most Valiant Order of the Noble Crown of Kelantan (SPKK)
34	Knight Grand Commanders of the Most Loyal Order of the Services to the Crown of Kelantan (SPJK)
35	Members of the Order of the Most Distinguished and Most Valiant Warrior (PYGP)
36	Knight Commanders of the Most Illustrious Order of the Crown of Kelantan (DPMK)
37	Knight Commanders of the Most Illustrious Order of the Life of the Crown of Kelantan (DJMK)
38	Knight Commanders of the Most Distinguished Order of the Loyalty to the Crown of Kelantan (DPSK)
39	Knight Commander of the Most Valiant Order of the Noble Crown of Kelantan (DPKK)
40	Knight Commander of the Most Loyal Order of the Services to the Crown of Kelantan (DPJK)
41	Commanders of the Most Illustrious Order of the Crown of Kelantan (PMK)
42	Commanders of the Most Illustrious Order of the Life of the Crown of Kelantan (JMK)
43	Commanders of the Most Distinguished Order of the Loyalty to the Crown of Kelantan (PSK)
44	Commander of the Most Valiant Order of the Noble Crown of Kelantan (PKK)
45	Commander of the Most Loyal Order of the Services to the Crown of Kelantan (PJK)
46	Officers of the Most Distinguished Order of the Loyalty to the Crown of Kelantan (BSK)
47	Officers of the Most Loyal Order of the Services to the Crown of Kelantan (BJK)
48	Members of the Most Distinguished Order of the Loyalty to the Crown of Kelantan (ASK)
49	Members of the Most Loyal Order of the Services to the Crown of Kelantan (AJK)
50	Members of the State Public Service Commission
51	Head of Departments
52	State Administrative Officers
53	Officers equivalent to Grade 41 and above
54	Assistant Head of Departments
55	Members of State Stars
56	Justices of the Peace
57	Officers equivalent to Grade 29 and above
58	Members of State Medals

== See also ==
- List of post-nominal letters (Kelantan)
