= Zaid Ibrahim =

Malaysian politician and lawyer

Yang Berbahagia Datuk Zaid Ibrahim DMSM
- محمد زيد بن إبراهيم

Minister of Legal Affairs and Judicial Reform
- In office 18 March 2008 – 17 September 2008
- Monarch: Mizan Zainal Abidin
- Prime Minister: Abdullah Ahmad Badawi
- Deputy: Hasan Malek
- Preceded by: Mohamed Nazri Abdul Aziz
- Succeeded by: Mohamed Nazri Abdul Aziz
- Constituency: Senator

Senator (Appointed by the Yang di-Pertuan Agong)
- In office 19 March 2008 – 15 September 2008
- Monarch: Mizan Zainal Abidin
- Prime Minister: Abdullah Ahmad Badawi

Member of the Malaysian Parliament for Kota Bharu
- In office 21 March 2004 – 8 March 2008
- Preceded by: Ramli Ibrahim (PAS)
- Succeeded by: Wan Abdul Rahim Wan Abdullah (PAS)
- Majority: 1,723 (2004)

Personal details
- Born: Mohd Zaid bin Ibrahim; 10 April 1951 (age 75) Kota Bharu, Kelantan, Federation of Malaya (now Malaysia)
- Citizenship: Malaysian
- Party: PKR (2008–2010); KITA (2010–2012); DAP (2017–2020); Independent (2012–2017, 2020–2022); UMNO (2000–2008, 2022–2026); PAS (2026–present)
- Other political affiliations: PR (2008–2010); PH (2017–2020); BN (2000–2008, 2022–2026); PN (2026–present)
- Spouse: Suliana Shamsuddin
- Children: 3
- Education: University of London (LLB)
- Occupation: Politician
- Profession: Lawyer
- Website: www.zaid.my

Mohd Zaid bin Ibrahim (Jawi: محمد زيد بن إبراهيم; born 10 April 1951) is a Malaysian politician, lawyer and blogger who served as the Minister in the Prime Minister's Department for Legal Affairs and Judicial Reform from March 2008 until September 2008. He was previously a Senator in the Dewan Negara, the upper chamber of the Parliament of Malaysia.

He was a member of the United Malays National Organisation (UMNO), before being suspended on 2 December 2008. UMNO is part of the then-ruling Barisan Nasional (BN) coalition which he joined in 2000. He was the Member of Parliament for Kota Bharu from 2004 to 2008. He is also the founder of Zaid Ibrahim & Co., the largest private law firm in Malaysia. Presently, he is a member of the Malaysian Islamic Party (PAS) in the Perikatan Nasional (PN) coalition.

He also acted as the defense attorney for former prime minister Najib Razak in the RM42 million SRC money laundering case. Najib was imprisoned on 23 August 2022, following an unsuccessful appeal.

== Early life and education ==
Born in Kota Bharu, Kelantan, Zaid went to Sultan Ismail College, Kota Bharu before started his law studies in Universiti Teknologi Mara, Shah Alam (or Institut Teknologi Mara as it was known then) by taking his LL.B (Hons.) External Programme which was conducted by the University of London.

== Early career ==
Upon graduating from ITM, Zaid went to London and was accepted as a Barrister-at-Law, Inner Temple. In 1987 he founded Zaid Ibrahim & Co., which as of 2008 is the largest law firm in Malaysia with over 140 lawyers.

== Early political career ==
In 2000, he joined UMNO, becoming Kota Bharu UMNO division chief a year later. He was later suspended but became Kelantan Umno deputy lion chief two years later. Zaid contested and won the Parliamentary seat of Kota Bharu in the 2004 general election. However, UMNO dropped him as a candidate in the 2008 general election. It suffered heavy losses, including the 2/3 majority necessary in the Dewan Rakyat to pass amendments to the Constitution.

Zaid is known for his criticism of the government's handling of legal issues such as the judiciary, human rights and Islamic law. He supported the establishment of the Royal Commission of Inquiry into the Lingam Video Clip, criticising the government's initial response to the clip.

== Minister of Law ==
When the then Prime Minister Abdullah Ahmad Badawi reshuffled his Cabinet after the just concluded 2008 general election, he appointed Zaid as a Minister in the Prime Minister's Department to oversee legal affairs and judicial reform. He was previously dropped from defending his seat as Member of Parliament for Kota Bharu which he won in 2004.

Zaid succeeded Datuk Seri Mohamed Nazri Abdul Aziz, who had previously held the portfolio, but as of 2008 continues to be a Minister in the Prime Minister's Department tasked with parliamentary affairs. Zaid was also appointed senator to the Dewan Negara on 18 March so he could take up his Cabinet posting. His appointment was greeted by The Economist as the "most promising" in the new Cabinet.

His appointment as Minister in the Prime Minister's Department in charge of reforming the judiciary, which has been riddled with scandals, especially following the Royal Commission of Inquiry into the Lingam Video Clip, is seen as an attempt by then Prime Minister Tun Abdullah Ahmad Badawi to weed out corruption and instill public respect and confidence in the judiciary.

Following his appointment as a Minister, Zaid resigned from all his posts in Zaid Ibrahim & Co., and relinquished his shares in the company. He was replaced as chairman by Nik Norzul Thani, who said the firm was implementing a succession plan they drew up after Zaid's election in 2004.

After criticising the arrests of three prominent individuals—Democratic Action Party MP Teresa Kok, blogger Raja Petra Kamaruddin, and journalist Tan Hoon Cheng—under the Internal Security Act, Zaid resigned from the Cabinet on 15 September 2008.

Zaid Ibrahim urged the Yang di-Pertuan Agong not to appoint Najib Razak as Prime Minister of Malaysia, and instead appoint someone else from UMNO. He pointed out Najib has been linked on the internet and by political rivals to the brutal murder of Altantuya Shaariibuu. Zaid also cited the RM400 million in commissions reportedly paid by the Defence Ministry while Najib was minister for the procurement of submarines, and pointed out that Abdul Razak Baginda, Najib's friend, was an agent in the deal. This was after Mahathir Mohamad, the former Prime Minister also said that Najib did not shine as a deputy prime minister and stated that Najib carried a lot of baggage into the Prime Minister's job.

== Political career after 2009 ==
=== 2009–2010: Joining Parti Keadilan Rakyat ===
In June 2009 Zaid joined the opposition Parti Keadilan Rakyat (PKR). As part of the Pakatan Rakyat opposition alliance, Zaid was appointed to head the coalition's Common Policy Framework group where he was responsible for formulating a common manifesto and governing policy between the three disparate political parties (PKR, PAS, DAP) that made up the loose opposition alliance. He also headed efforts, in his role as Pakatan coordinator and pro-tem committee chairman of Pakatan Rakyat Malaysia, to register Pakatan Rakyat as an official political coalition party with Malaysia's Registrar of Societies on 3 November 2009. During the Hulu Selangor by-election in April 2010, Zaid was also fielded as the PKR candidate, but was narrowly defeated by P. Kamalanathan of the Malaysian Indian Congress.

In the 2010 PKR party elections, Zaid Ibrahim contested for the party post of Deputy President after having received over 30 nominations. He confirmed his candidacy in a posting on his blog on 16 October 2010. However, in November 2010, Zaid Ibrahim withdrew his candidacy as a sign of protest against serious allegations of fraud and electoral misconduct perpetrated in the PKR party elections by his opponent, the PKR establishment candidate Azmin Ali. He subsequently resigned from the party, citing his loss of confidence in the PKR party leadership for their involvement in the electoral fraud of the 2010 party elections.

=== 2010–2012: Founding KITA ===
On 13 December 2010, the Malaysian Human's Justice Front (AKIM), a tiny Kelantan-based opposition party, announced that Zaid Ibrahim has joined its ranks as a party member, with the view of having Zaid lead and revamp AKIM into a viable political party for the coming 13th Malaysian General Elections. The party further explained that Zaid had submitted his membership application to join AKIM in Nov 2010 after his former party, PKR, accepted Zaid's resignation.

During the party's annual general meeting on 15 December 2010, Zaid Ibrahim was elected as the party's new president, taking over from Zakaria Salleh, the outgoing president of AKIM. The party also announced that it had adopted a new name, the People's Welfare Party or Parti Kesejahteraan Insan Tanah Air (KITA). Zaid Ibrahim also announced that KITA would be a multi-racial democratic party open to all races in Malaysia, and despite its current small size, aims to make an impact in the country's political scene by focusing on goals for the long haul. Zaid also unveiled the KITA's official party ideology and principles, including its new constitution, manifesto, and logo, in Kuala Lumpur on 19 January 2011. Zaid resigned as KITA chief in 2012.

=== 2012–2017: Becoming an independent ===
In 2014, after stating that the lack of religious discourse by the religious leaders in Malaysia that does not allow for different interpretations of Islam promotes extremism and makes Malaysia similar to the Islamic State of Iraq and Syria, he was criticised by Islamic scholar Fathul Bari Mat Jahya for being a liberal who only wanted to follow civil laws and not those created by Allah and that it is the responsibility of the Ulema to specifically identify what is wajib (obligatory), halal (allowed), and haram (prohibited).

=== 2017–2020: Joining Democratic Action Party ===
In 2017, Zaid had announced in a press conference in his Petaling Jaya home that he has officially joined the Democratic Action Party, reasoning that "he will be able to reach out to Malay voters".

On 20 April 2020, Zaid had announced he was leaving DAP.

On 20 October 2020, Zaid was no longer Kelantan DAP Chairman. He said "Many still describe me as Kelantan DAP chief. It's no longer true,...".

=== 2022–2026: Returning To UMNO ===
In August 2022, Zaid Ibrahim returned to UMNO. He said "I want UMNO because I feel that they can provide that solidarity. They can provide that energy and the strength to bring everybody else on board and institute real reform in this country..."

On 16 September 2022, Zaid rejoined UMNO. He said he wants to reform the party from “within”.

On 14 June 2023, Zaid has called on Prime Minister Anwar Ibrahim to release former Prime Minister Najib Razak "in the interest of the people." He argues that in the grand scheme of things, the RM42 million (the amount of corruption for which Najib is imprisoned) is a relatively minor issue.

=== 2026–present: Joining PAS ===
In June 2026, Zaid Ibrahim joined PAS in advance of state elections in Negri Sembilan and Johor.

== Personal life ==
Zaid is married to Datin Suliana Shamsuddin Alias and the couple have three children. In 2008, he was one of four Malaysians named by Forbes in its list of generous and interesting philanthropists in Asia, for starting the Kelantan Foundation for the Disabled in 1998. The foundation provides free counselling services, physiotherapy, transportation and home visits to 2,400 disabled individuals from Zaid's home state of Kelantan, who have Down syndrome, cerebral palsy, blindness, or other disabilities.

== Election results ==
Parliament of Malaysia
Year	Constituency	Candidate	Votes	Pct	Opposition	Votes	Pct	Ballot cast	Majority	Turnout
2004	P021 Kota Bharu	Mohd Zaid Ibrahim (UMNO)	23,831	51.88%	Nik Mahmood Nik Hassan (PKR)	22,108	48.12%	46,707	1,723	76.06%
2010	P094 Hulu Selangor	Mohd Zaid Ibrahim (PKR)	23,272	48.21%	Kamalanathan Panchanathan (MIC)	24,997	51.79%	49,067	1,725	76.07%

== Honours ==
=== Honours of Malaysia ===
- Malacca
  - Companion Class I of the Exalted Order of Malacca (DMSM) – Datuk (2003)

== See also ==
- Frog (Malaysian politics)
