= Bunut Payong =

State constituency in Kelantan, Malaysia

Bunut Payong (N10)
Kelantan constituency

State constituency
- Legislature: Kelantan State Legislative Assembly
MLA
Shaari Mat Yaman
PN
- Constituency created: 1984
- First contested: 1986
- Last contested: 2023

Demographics
- Electors (2023): 36,844

Bunut Payong is a state constituency in Kelantan, Malaysia, that has been represented in the Kelantan State Legislative Assembly.

The state constituency was first contested in 1986 and is mandated to return a single Assemblyman to the Kelantan State Legislative Assembly under the first-past-the-post voting system.

== Demographics ==
As of 2020, Bunut Payong has a population of 43,665 people.

Ethnic breakdown of Bunut Payong's electorate as of 2023
1. Malay (93.8%)
2. Chinese (5.17%)
3. Other ethnicities (0.61%)
4. Indian (0.46%)

== History ==
=== Polling districts ===
According to the Gazette issued on 30 March 2018, the Bunut Payong constituency has a total of 11 polling districts.

State Constituency	Polling Districts	Code	Location
Bunut Payong（N10）	Kg Sireh Bawah Lembah	021/10/01	Tadika Tg. Anis 1
Bunut Payong（N10）	Kubor Kuda	021/10/02	SMA Naim Lil-Banat
Bunut Payong（N10）	Jalan Raja Dewa	021/10/03	SMK Sultan Ismail
Bunut Payong（N10）	Telipot	021/10/04	Maktab Sultan Ismail
Bunut Payong（N10）	Kampung Belukar	021/10/05	SMK Zainab (1)
Bunut Payong（N10）	Bunut Payong Hilir	021/10/06	SK Sultan Ismail (1)
Bunut Payong（N10）	Pintu Geng	021/10/07	SMK Pintu Geng
Bunut Payong（N10）	Kota Utata	021/10/08	SK Kota
Bunut Payong（N10）	Lundang	021/10/09	SK Lundang
Bunut Payong（N10）	Bunut Payong	021/10/10	SK Bunut Payong
Bunut Payong（N10）	Kampung Wakaf Che Yeh	021/10/11	SMK Kota

=== Representation history ===
Members of the Legislative Assembly for Bunut Payong
Assembly	No	Years	Member	Party
Constituency created from Telipot
7th	N07	1986–1990	Ahmad Rastom Ahmad Maher	BN (UMNO)
8th	N07	1990–1995	Halim Mohamad	APU (PAS)
9th	N08	1995–1999	Halim Mohamad	APU (PAS)
10th	N08	1999–2004	Takiyuddin Hassan	BA (PAS)
11th	N10	2004–2008	Takiyuddin Hassan	BA (PAS)
12th	N10	2008–2013	Takiyuddin Hassan	PR (PAS)
13th	N10	2013–2015	Ramli Mamat	PR (PAS)
13th	N10	2015–2016	Ramli Mamat	PAS
13th	N10	2016–2018	Ramli Mamat	GS (PAS)
14th	N10	2018–2020	Ramli Mamat	GS (PAS)
14th	N10	2020–2023	Ramli Mamat	PN (PAS)
15th	N10	2023–present	Shaari Mat Yaman	PN (PAS)

== Election results ==
Kelantan state election, 2023: Bunut Payong
Party	Candidate	Votes	%	∆%
PAS	Shaari Mat Yaman	13,887	62.66	▲12.57
BN	Mohamed Hasnan Che Hussin	8,277	37.34	▲8.47
Total valid votes		22,164	100.00	
Total rejected ballots		114		
Unreturned ballots		57		
Turnout		22,278	60.62	▼19.24
Registered electors		36,844		
Majority		5,610	25.32	▲4.10
PAS hold		Swing		

Kelantan state election, 2018: Bunut Payong
Party	Candidate	Votes	%	∆%
PAS	Ramli Mamat	10,921	50.09	▼13.63
BN	Mohamed Hasnan Che Hussin	6,294	28.87	▼7.41
PKR	Sanusi Othman	4,586	21.04	▲21.04
Total valid votes		21,801	100.00	
Total rejected ballots		214		
Unreturned ballots		256		
Turnout		22,271	79.86	▼3.79
Registered electors		28,437		
Majority		4,627	21.22	▼6.22
PAS hold		Swing		

Kelantan state election, 2013: Bunut Payong
Party	Candidate	Votes	%	∆%
PAS	Ramli Mamat	13,447	63.72	▲0.47
BN	Mohd Fakhrurazi Abdul Rahim	7,655	36.28	▼0.47
Total valid votes		21,102	100.00	
Total rejected ballots		189		
Unreturned ballots		75		
Turnout		21,336	83.65	▲3.77
Registered electors		25,506		
Majority		5,792	27.44	▲0.94
PAS hold		Swing		

Kelantan state election, 2008: Bunut Payong
Party	Candidate	Votes	%	∆%
PAS	Takiyuddin Hassan	10,360	63.25	▲6.71
BN	Rosmadi Ismail	6,019	36.75	▼6.71 }
Total valid votes		16,379	100.00	
Total rejected ballots		146		
Unreturned ballots		0		
Turnout		16,525	79.88	▲2.27
Registered electors		20,688		
Majority		4,341	26.50	▲13.41
PAS hold		Swing		

Kelantan state election, 2004: Bunut Payong
Party	Candidate	Votes	%	∆%
PAS	Takiyuddin Hassan	8,340	56.55	▼14.45
BN	Sekh Mohd Ruzi Sekh Ahamad	6,409	43.45	▲14.45
Total valid votes		14,749	100.00	
Total rejected ballots		124		
Unreturned ballots		144		
Turnout		15,017	77.61	▲4.91
Registered electors		19,349		
Majority		1,931	13.09	▼28.91
PAS hold		Swing		

Kelantan state election, 1999: Bunut Payong
Party	Candidate	Votes	%	∆%
PAS	Takiyuddin Hassan	9,362	71.00	▲10.91
BN	Ahmad Rastom Ahmad Maher	3,824	29.00	▼10.91
Total valid votes		13,186	100.00	
Total rejected ballots		116		
Unreturned ballots		23		
Turnout		13,325	72.70	▼0.30
Registered electors		18,328		
Majority		5,538	42.00	▲21.82
PAS hold		Swing		

Kelantan state election, 1995: Bunut Payong
Party	Candidate	Votes	%	∆%
PAS	Halim Mohamed	7,414	60.09	▼5.77
BN	Zahari Ab Wahab	4,924	39.91	▲5.77
Total valid votes		12,338	100.00	
Total rejected ballots		140		
Unreturned ballots		49		
Turnout		12,527	73.01	▼1.21
Registered electors		17,159		
Majority		2,490	20.18	▼11.55
PAS hold		Swing		

Kelantan state election, 1990: Bunut Payong
Party	Candidate	Votes	%	∆%
PAS	Halim Mohamed	8,494	65.87	▲25.63
BN	Ahmad Rastom Ahmad Maher	4,402	34.13	▼21.65
Total valid votes		12,896	100.00	
Total rejected ballots		299		
Unreturned ballots		31		
Turnout		13,226	74.21	▲5.20
Registered electors		17,822		
Majority		4,092	31.73	▲16.18
PAS hold		Swing		

Kelantan state election, 1986: Bunut Payong
Party	Candidate	Votes	%
BN	Ahmad Rastom Ahmad Maher	6,291	55.79
PAS	Wan Hassan Wan Othman	4,537	40.23
DAP	Ya'acob Abdullah	449	3.98
Total valid votes		11,277	100.00
Total rejected ballots		283	
Unreturned ballots		0	
Turnout		11,560	69.01
Registered electors		16,750	
Majority		1,754	15.55
This was a new constituency created.
