= Ramli Mamat =

Malaysian politician

Yang Berbahagia Dato' Ramli Mamat DJMK
- راملي بن مامت

Exco roles (Kelantan)
- 2013–2018: Chairman of the Youth, Sports and Non-governmental Organisations

Faction represented in Kelantan State Legislative Assembly
- 2013–2020: Malaysian Islamic Party
- 2020–2023: Perikatan Nasional

Personal details
- Born: 22 July 1964 (age 61) Kampung Sireh, Jalan Sultanah Zainab, Kota Bharu, Kelantan, Malaysia
- Citizenship: Malaysian
- Party: Malaysian Islamic Party (PAS)
- Other political affiliations: Perikatan Nasional (PN); Muafakat Nasional (MN); Pakatan Rakyat (PR)
- Occupation: Politician
- Profession: Medical Physician

Ramli bin Mamat is a Malaysian politician and served as Kelantan State Executive Councillor.

== Election results ==
Kelantan State Legislative Assembly
Year	Constituency	Candidate	Votes	Pct	Opponent(s)	Votes	Pct	Ballots cast	Majority	Turnout
2013	N10 Bunut Payong	Ramli Mamat (PAS)	13,447	63.78%	Mohd. Fakhrurazi Abdul Rahim (UMNO)	7,655	36.22%	21,291	5,792	83.80%
2018	N10 Bunut Payong	Ramli Mamat (PAS)	10,921	50.09%	Mohamed Hasnan Che Hussin (UMNO)	6,294	28.87%	22,271	4,627	78.30%
2018	N10 Bunut Payong	Ramli Mamat (PAS)	10,921	50.09%	Sanusi Othman (AMANAH)	4,586	21.04%	22,271	4,627	78.30%

== Honours ==
- Kelantan
  - Knight Commander of the Order of the Life of the Crown of Kelantan (DJMK) – Dato' (2016)
