= Tanjong Mas =

State constituency in Kelantan, Malaysia

Tanjong Mas (N08)
Kelantan constituency

State constituency
- Legislature: Kelantan State Legislative Assembly
MLA
Rohani Ibrahim
PN
- Constituency created: 1994
- First contested: 1995
- Last contested: 2023

Demographics
- Electors (2023): 45,579

Tanjong Mas is a state constituency in Kelantan, Malaysia, that has been represented in the Kelantan State Legislative Assembly.

The state constituency was first contested in 1995 and is mandated to return a single Assemblyman to the Kelantan State Legislative Assembly under the first-past-the-post voting system.

== Demographics ==
As of 2020, Tanjong Mas has a population of 66,760 people.

Ethnic breakdown of Tanjong Mas's electorate as of 2023
1. Malay (90.3%)
2. Chinese (7.70%)
3. Other ethnicities (1.55%)
4. Indian (0.42%)

== History ==
=== Polling districts ===
According to the Gazette issued on 30 March 2018, the Tanjong Mas constituency has a total of 10 polling districts.

| State Constituency | Polling Districts | Code | Location |
|---|---|---|---|
| Tanjong Mas (N08） | Wakaf Mek Zainab | 021/08/01 | SK Tengku Indera Petra |
| Tanjong Mas (N08） | Tanjong Chat | 021/08/02 | SK Padang Garong 2 |
| Tanjong Mas (N08） | Sungai Keladi | 021/08/03 | SMK Putera |
| Tanjong Mas (N08） | Kok Pasir | 021/08/04 | SMK Tanjung Mas |
| Tanjong Mas (N08） | Khatib Ali | 021/08/05 | SMK Dato' Ahmad Maher |
| Tanjong Mas (N08） | Tanjong Mas | 021/08/06 | Maahad Muhammadi (Lelaki) |
| Tanjong Mas (N08） | Cherang | 021/08/07 | SK Sultan Ismail (4) |
| Tanjong Mas (N08） | Kampung Bayam | 021/08/08 | SK Sultan Ismail (2) |
| Tanjong Mas (N08） | Langgar | 021/08/09 | SK Langgar |
| Tanjong Mas (N08） | Paya Bemban | 021/08/10 | SK Islah |

=== Representation history ===
Members of the Legislative Assembly for Tanjong Mas
| Assembly | No | Years | Member | Party |
Constituency created from Lundang
| 9th | N07 | 1995–1999 | Wan Abdul Rahim Wan Abdullah | PAS |
| 10th | N07 | 1999–2004 | Wan Abdul Rahim Wan Abdullah | PAS |
| 11th | N08 | 2004–2008 | Rohani Ibrahim | PAS |
| 12th | N08 | 2008–2013 | Rohani Ibrahim | PR (PAS) |
| 13th | N08 | 2013–2018 | Rohani Ibrahim | PR (PAS) |
| 14th | N08 | 2018–2020 | Rohani Ibrahim | PAS |
| 14th | N08 | 2020–2023 | Rohani Ibrahim | PN (PAS) |
| 15th | N08 | 2023–present | Rohani Ibrahim | PN (PAS) |

== Election results ==
Kelantan state election, 2023: Tanjong Mas
| Party | Candidate | Votes | % | ∆% |
|---|---|---|---|---|
| PAS | Rohani Ibrahim | 17,529 | 66.23 | ▲11.96 |
| PH | Zinda Khalil Sastro Hassan | 8,936 | 33.77 | ▲33.77 |
| Total valid votes | | 26,465 | 100.00 | |
| Total rejected ballots | | 145 | | |
| Unreturned ballots | | 62 | | |
| Turnout | | 26,672 | 58.52 | ▼18.69 |
| Registered electors | | 45,579 | | |
| Majority | | 8,593 | 32.46 | ▲3.52 |
| PAS hold | | Swing | | |

Kelantan state election, 2018: Tanjong Mas
| Party | Candidate | Votes | % | ∆% |
|---|---|---|---|---|
| PAS | Rohani Ibrahim | 13,154 | 54.27 | ▼14.88 |
| PKR | Hafidzah Mustakim | 6,139 | 25.33 | ▲25.33 |
| BN | Madihah Ab Aziz | 4,945 | 20.40 | ▼10.45 |
| Total valid votes | | 24,238 | 100.00 | |
| Total rejected ballots | | 201 | | |
| Unreturned ballots | | 356 | | |
| Turnout | | 24,795 | 77.21 | ▼4.61 |
| Registered electors | | 32,114 | | |
| Majority | | 7,015 | 28.94 | ▼9.36 |
| PAS hold | | Swing | | |

Kelantan state election, 2013: Tanjong Mas
| Party | Candidate | Votes | % | ∆% |
|---|---|---|---|---|
| PAS | Rohani Ibrahim | 15,387 | 69.15 | ▲0.14 |
| BN | Kanidy Omar | 6,866 | 30.85 | ▼0.14 |
| Total valid votes | | 22,253 | 100.00 | |
| Total rejected ballots | | 198 | | |
| Unreturned ballots | | 61 | | |
| Turnout | | 22,512 | 81.82 | ▲2.58 |
| Registered electors | | 27,514 | | |
| Majority | | 8,521 | 38.30 | ▲0.28 |
| PAS hold | | Swing | | |

Kelantan state election, 2008: Tanjong Mas
| Party | Candidate | Votes | % | ∆% |
|---|---|---|---|---|
| PAS | Rohani Ibrahim | 11,095 | 69.01 | ▲8.48 |
| BN | Khazuni Othman | 4,983 | 30.99 | ▼8.48 |
| Total valid votes | | 16,078 | 100.00 | |
| Total rejected ballots | | 155 | | |
| Unreturned ballots | | 40 | | |
| Turnout | | 16,273 | 79.24 | ▲1.80 |
| Registered electors | | 20,537 | | |
| Majority | | 6,112 | 38.01 | ▲16.95 |
| PAS hold | | Swing | | |

Kelantan state election, 2004: Tanjong Mas
| Party | Candidate | Votes | % | ∆% |
|---|---|---|---|---|
| PAS | Rohani Ibrahim | 8,015 | 60.53 | ▼14.91 |
| BN | Che Mansor Adabi Che Hassan | 5,226 | 39.47 | ▲14.91 |
| Total valid votes | | 13,241 | 100.00 | |
| Total rejected ballots | | 134 | | |
| Unreturned ballots | | 0 | | |
| Turnout | | 13,375 | 77.43 | ▲5.26 |
| Registered electors | | 17,273 | | |
| Majority | | 2,789 | 21.06 | ▼29.82 |
| PAS hold | | Swing | | |

Kelantan state election, 1999: Tanjong Mas
| Party | Candidate | Votes | % | ∆% |
|---|---|---|---|---|
| PAS | Wan Abdul Rahim Wan Abdullah | 10,843 | 75.44 | ▲7.19 |
| BN | Zamri Ramli | 3,530 | 24.56 | ▼6.76 |
| Total valid votes | | 14,373 | 100.00 | |
| Total rejected ballots | | 173 | | |
| Unreturned ballots | | 24 | | |
| Turnout | | 14,570 | 72.18 | ▲0.41 |
| Registered electors | | 20,187 | | |
| Majority | | 7,313 | 50.88 | ▲13.95 |
| PAS hold | | Swing | | |

Kelantan state election, 1995: Tanjong Mas
| Party | Candidate | Votes | % |
|---|---|---|---|
| PAS | Wan Abdul Rahim Wan Abdullah | 9,213 | 68.25 |
| BN | Mohamad Fatmi Che Salleh | 4,228 | 31.32 |
| KITA | Ramli Sulaiman | 57 | 0.42 |
| Total valid votes | | 13,498 | 100.00 |
| Total rejected ballots | | 199 | |
| Unreturned ballots | | 49 | |
| Turnout | | 13,746 | 71.77 |
| Registered electors | | 19,153 | |
| Majority | | 4,985 | 36.93 |
This was a new constituency created.
