= People's Welfare Party (Malaysia) =

Parti Kesejahteraan Insan Tanah Air People's Welfare Party
- Abbreviation: KITA
- Chief: Masrum Dayat
- Founder: Musa Salih (AKIM); Zaid Ibrahim (KITA)
- Founded: AKIM: 16 February 1995; KITA: 18 January 2011
- Split from: Malaysian Islamic Party (PAS)
- Preceded by: Malaysian People Justice Front (AKIM)
- Headquarters: Petaling Jaya, Selangor
- Youth wing: Pemuda KITA
- Membership: 20,000
- Ideology: Social justice Social democracy
- Colours: Orange
- Dewan Negara: 0 / 70
- Dewan Rakyat: 0 / 222
- Dewan Undangan Negeri: 0 / 587

Website
- partikita.com

The People's Welfare Party or Parti Kesejahteraan Insan Tanah Air (KITA) is a small political party in Malaysia, based in the state of Kelantan.

== History ==
=== Founded as AKIM (1995) ===
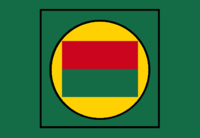
Angkatan Keadilan Insan Malaysia (AKIM)

The party was formerly known as the Malaysian People Justice Front or Angkatan Keadilan Insan Malaysia when it was founded on 16 February 1995. AKIM was founded as a splinter party of Pan-Malaysian Islamic Party in 1995 following internal disagreements by members within the party. A few members from Parti Melayu Semangat 46 also joined the fray following its dissolution in 1996. AKIM contested in the 1999 general elections for the parliamentary seats of Pasir Puteh and Kota Bharu but failed.

In 2008, the party's president, Hanafi Mamat registered itself to participate in the Permatang Pauh by-election, but only managed to catch 92 votes in the election and losing his RM 15,000 deposit in the process. Nevertheless, he hoped that the election could serve as a platform to introduce the party to the nation.

=== Relaunched as KITA (2011) ===
On 13 December 2010, AKIM announced that Datuk Zaid Ibrahim has joined its ranks as a party member, with the view of having Zaid lead and revamp AKIM into a viable political party for the coming 13th Malaysian General Elections. The party further explained that Zaid had submitted his membership application to join AKIM in Nov 2010 after his former party, Parti Keadilan Rakyat, accepted Zaid's resignation.

During the party's annual general meeting on 15 December 2010, Zaid Ibrahim was elected as the party's new president (later called "Party Chief"), taking over from Zakaria Salleh, the outgoing president of AKIM. The party also announced that it will be adopting a new name, the People's Welfare Party or Parti Kesejahteraan Insan Tanah Air.

Zaid Ibrahim also announced that KITA would be a multi-racial democratic party open to all races in Malaysia and despite its current small size, aims to make an impact in the country's political scene by focusing on goals for the long haul. Zaid also announced that KITA's official party ideology and principles, including its new constitution, manifesto and logo, will be unveiled in Kuala Lumpur on 18 January 2011.

Zaid Ibrahim sought to dissolve KITA in February 2012, and resigned as its chief later that year due to quarrels within the party.

=== GHB takeover rumours ===
In 2015, the party once again were in the news as Gerakan Harapan Baru (GHB) movement through its Penang interim chairman committee, Mujahid Yusof Rawa announced GHB intention to take over the party and rebrand it as a new party for the PAS dissidents. However the rumour has been dismissed by then KITA secretary-general, Azmi Othman. GHB later completed the takeover of another party, Parti Pekerja Malaysia and rebrand it as Parti Amanah Negara (AMANAH or PAN).

== Presidents/Party Chief ==
=== Presidents ===
- 1995–1998: Musa Salih
- 1998–1999: Mohd Din Nizam Din (acting)
- 1999–2002: Mohammad Yusoff
- 2002–2009: Hanafi Mamat
- 2009–2010: Zakaria Salleh

=== Party Chief ===
- 2010–2012: Zaid Ibrahim
- 2012–: Masrum Dayat

== General election results ==
Election	Total seats won	Seats contested	Total votes	Voting Percentage	Outcome of election	Election leader
1995 (as AKIM)	0 / 192	2			; No representation in Parliament	Musa Salih
1999 (as AKIM)	0 / 193	1			; No representation in Parliament	Mohd Din Nizam Din
2013	0 / 222	2	623	0.01%	; No representation in Parliament	Masrum Dayat

=== State election results ===
State election	State Legislative Assembly						
State election	Kedah	Kelantan	Penang	Selangor	Malacca	Sabah	Total won / Total contested
2/3 majority	2 / 3	2 / 3	2 / 3	2 / 3	2 / 3	2 / 3	
1995		0 / 43					0 / 15
1999		0 / 43					0 / 1
2013	0 / 36		0 / 40	0 / 56	0 / 28	0 / 60	0 / 11

== See also ==
- Category:People's Welfare Party (Malaysia) politicians
