= List of post-nominal letters (Kelantan) =

Knighthood order of the Sultanate of Kelantan

This is a list of awards and decorations in Kelantan which carry post-nominal letters. The order in which they follow an individual's name is the same as the order of precedence for the wearing of order insignias, decorations, and medals. When applicable, non-hereditary titles are indicated.

| Grades | | Post-nominal | Title | Wife's title | Ribbon |
|---|---|---|---|---|---|
The Most Esteemed Royal Family Order of Kelantan (Star of Yunus) - Darjah Kerabat Yang Amat Dihormati (Bintang al-Yunusi)
| Star | Darjah Kerabat Yang Amat Di-Hormati (Al-Yunusi) | D.K. | -- | -- | |
The Order for Kerabat Titleholders - Darjah Kerabat Bergelar
| Star | Darjah Kerabat Bergelar | BERGELAR | Tengku Besar Indera Raja; Tengku Sri Maharaja; Tengku Sri Utama Raja; Tengku Sri Mara Raja; Tengku Seriwa Raja; Tengku Sri Wangsa; Tengku Sri Kelana D'Raja; Tengku Sri Ismara Raja; Tengku Sri Wangsa Raja; Tengku Sri Indera Mahkota; Tengku Sri Pekerma Raja; Tengku Sri Akar Raja; Tengku Temenggong Aria Pahlawan; Tengku Kaya Pahlawan; Tengku Kaya Perkasa; Tengku Sri Jaya Raja; Tengku Selia Raja; Tengku Petra Semerak; Tengku Maharani Putri; Tengku Maharani; Tengku Keso'ma Mastika | Tengku Puan/Che Puan Besar Indera Raja; Tengku Puan/Che Puan Sri Maharaja; Tengku Puan/Che Puan Sri Utama Raja; Tengku Puan/Che Puan Sri Mara Raja; Tengku Puan/Che Puan Seriwa Raja; Tengku Puan/Che Puan Sri Wangsa; Tengku Puan/Che Puan Sri Kelana D'Raja; Tengku Puan/Che Puan Sri Ismara Raja; Tengku Puan/Che Puan Sri Wangsa Raja; Tengku Puan/Che Puan Sri Indera Mahkota; Tengku Puan/Che Puan Sri Pekerma Raja; Tengku Puan/Che Puan Sri Akar Raja; Tengku Puan/Che Puan Temenggong Aria Pahlawan; Tengku Puan/Che Puan Kaya Pahlawan; Tengku Puan/Che Puan Kaya Perkasa; Tengku Puan/Che Puan Sri Jaya Raja; Tengku Puan/Che Puan Selia Raja; Tengku Puan/Che Puan Petra Semerak | |
The Order for Dato' Titleholders - Darjah Dato' Bergelar
| Star | Darjah Dato' Bergelar | BERGELAR | Dato' Sri Paduka Raja; Dato' Sri Setia Raja; Dato' Sri Amar D'Raja; Dato' Sri D'Raja; Dato' Sri Nara D'Raja; Dato' Sri Nirmala; Dato' Sri Ratna D'Raja; Dato' Sri Derma; Dato' Amar D'Raja; Dato' Aria D'Raja; Dato' Bentara Setia; Dato' Wira Jaya; Dato' Istiadat Mahkota; Dato' Bentara Kanan; Dato' Bentara Kiri; Dato' Bentara Dalam; Dato' Bentara Luar; Dato' Kaya Muda; Dato' Bentara Muda; Dato' Bentara Jaya; Dato' Biji Sura; Dato' Lela D'Raja; Dato' Adika Raja; Dato' Kaya Setia; Dato' Lela Negara; Dato' Lela Jasa; Dato' Kaya Bakti; Dato' Kaya Nara; Dato' Kaya Ratna; Dato' Kaya Pati; Dato' Kaya Perba; Dato' Perwira Raja; Dato' Kaya Derma; Dato' Kaya Budi; Dato' Megat Lela D'Raja; Dato' Bandar; Dato' Panglima Laut; Dato' Panglima Perang; Dato' Lela Muda; Dato' Bentara Guna; Dato' Penghulu Balai; Dato' Kaya Hulubalang; Dato' Kaya Perwara; Dato' Biji Wangsa; Dato' Bentara Sakti; Dato' Bentara Ratna; Dato' Megat Muda; Dato' Lela Perkasa; Dato' Panglima Dalam; Dato' Megat Mahkota; Dato' Ratna Nila | Datin Sri Paduka Raja; Datin Sri Setia Raja; Datin Sri Amar D'Raja; Datin Sri D'Raja; Datin Sri Nara D'Raja; Datin Sri Nirmala; Datin Sri Ratna D'Raja; Datin Sri Derma; Datin Amar D'Raja; Datin Aria D'Raja; Datin Bentara Setia; Datin Wira Jaya; Datin Istiadat Mahkota; Datin Bentara Kanan; Datin Bentara Kiri; Datin Bentara Dalam; Datin Bentara Luar; Datin Kaya Muda; Datin Bentara Muda; Datin Bentara Jaya; Datin Biji Sura; Datin Lela D'Raja; Datin Adika Raja; Datin Kaya Setia; Datin Lela Negara; Datin Lela Jasa; Datin Kaya Bakti; Datin Kaya Nara; Datin Kaya Ratna; Datin Kaya Pati; Datin Kaya Perba; Datin Perwira Raja; Datin Kaya Derma; Datin Kaya Budi; Datin Megat Lela D'Raja; Datin Bandar; Datin Panglima Laut; Datin Panglima Perang; Datin Lela Muda; Datin Bentara Guna; Datin Penghulu Balai; Datin Kaya Hulubalang; Datin Kaya Perwara; Datin Biji Wangsa; Datin Bentara Sakti; Datin Bentara Ratna; Datin Megat Muda; Datin Lela Perkasa; Datin Panglima Dalam; Datin Megat Mahkota; Datin Ratna Nila | |
The Most Illustrious Order of the Crown of Kelantan (Star of Muhammad) - Darjah Kebesaran Mahkota Kelantan Yang Amat Mulia (Bintang al-Muhammadi)
| Knight Grand Commander | Seri Paduka Mahkota Kelantan (Al-Muhammadi I) | S.P.M.K. | Dato' | Datin | |
| Knight Commander | Dato' Paduka Mahkota Kelantan (Al-Muhammadi II) | D.P.M.K. | Dato' | Datin | |
| Commander | Paduka Mahkota Kelantan (Al-Muhammadi III) | P.M.K. | -- | -- | |
The Most Illustrious Order of the Life of the Crown of Kelantan (Star of Ismail) - Darjah Kebesaran Jiwa Mahkota Kelantan Yang Amat Mulia (Bintang Al-Ismaili)
| Knight Grand Commander | Seri Paduka Jiwa Mahkota Kelantan (Al-Ismaili I) | S.J.M.K. | Dato' | Datin | 1925-2006 2006 - |
| Knight Commander | Dato' Paduka Jiwa Mahkota Kelantan (Al-Ismaili II) | D.J.M.K. | Dato' | Datin | 1925-2006 2006 - |
| Companion | Paduka Setia Jiwa Mahkota Kelantan (Al-Ismaili III) | J.M.K. | -- | -- | 1925-2006 2006 - |
The Most Valiant Order of the Noble Crown of Kelantan (Star of Yahya) - Darjah Kebesaran Kesateria Mahkota Kelantan Yang Amat Perkasa (Bintang al-Yahyawi)
| Knight Grand Commander | Seri Paduka Kesateria Mahkota Kelantan (Al-Yahyawi I) | S.P.K.K. | Dato' | Datin | |
| Knight Commander | Dato' Paduka Kesateria Mahkota Kelantan (Al-Yahyawi II) | D.P.K.K. | Dato' | Datin | |
| Commander | Paduka Kesateria Mahkota Kelantan (Al-Yahyawi III) | P.K.K. | -- | -- | |
The Most Distinguished Order of Loyalty to the Crown of Kelantan (Star of Ibrahim) - Darjah Kebesaran Setia Mahkota Kelantan Yang Amat Terbilang (Bintang al-Ibrahimi)
| Knight Grand Commander | Seri Paduka Setia Mahkota Kelantan (Al-Ibrahimi I) | S.P.S.K. | Dato' | Datin | |
| Knight Commander | Dato' Paduka Setia Mahkota Kelantan (Al-Ibrahimi II) | D.P.S.K. | Dato' | Datin | |
| Commander | Paduka Setia Mahkota Kelantan (Al-Ibrahimi III) | P.S.K. | -- | -- | |
| Officer | Bentara Setia Mahkota Kelantan (Al-Ibrahimi IV) | B.S.K. | -- | -- | |
| Member | Ahli Setia Mahkota Kelantan (Al-Ibrahimi V) | A.S.K. | -- | -- | |
The Most Loyal Order of the Services to the Crown of Kelantan (Star of Petra) - Darjah Kebesaran Jasa Mahkota Kelantan (Bintang al-Petrawi)
| Knight Grand Commander | Seri Paduka Jasa Mahkota Kelantan (Al-Petrawi I) | S.P.J.K. | Dato' | Datin | |
| Knight Commander | Dato' Paduka Jasa Mahkota Kelantan (Al-Petrawi II) | D.P.J.K. | Dato' | Datin | |
| Commander | Paduka Jasa Mahkota Kelantan (Al-Petrawi III) | P.J.K. | -- | -- | |
| Officer | Bentara Jasa Mahkota Kelantan (Al-Petrawi IV) | B.J.K. | -- | -- | |
| Member | Ahli Jasa Mahkota Kelantan (Al-Petrawi V) | A.J.K. | -- | -- | |
The Order of the Most Distinguished and Most Valiant Warrior - Darjah Pahlawan Yang Amat Gagah Perkasa Yang Amat Mulia
| Star | Pahlawan Yang Amat Gagah Perkasa | P.Y.G.P. | -- | -- | |
Crown of Kelantan Decoration - Seri Mahkota Kelantan (4th class for the Order of the Crown of Kelantan)
| Decoration | Seri Mahkota Kelantan | S.M.K. | -- | -- | |
Seri Kelantan Decoration - Seri Kelantan (5th class for the Order of the Crown of Kelantan)
| Gold Medal | Seri Kelantan | S.K. | -- | -- | |
Ahli Kelantan Decoration - Ahli Kelantan (4th class for the Order of the Life of the Crown of Kelantan)
| Silver Medal | Ahli Kelantan | A.K. | -- | -- | |
Meritorious Service Medal - Pingat Bakti
| Silver Medal | Pingat Bakti | P.B. | -- | -- | |
Medal of Loyalty to the Crown of Kelantan - Pingat Setia Mahkota Kelantan (6th class for the Order of the Loyalty to the Crown of Kelantan)
| Silver Medal | Pingat Setia Mahkota Kelantan | P.S. | -- | -- | |
Loyal Service Medal - Pingat Taat
| Silver Medal | Pingat Taat | P.T. | -- | -- | |
Good Conduct Medal - Pingat Perangai Baik
| Silver Medal | Pingat Perangai Baik | P.P.B. | -- | -- | |
State Council Inauguration Commemorative Medal 1939 - Pingat Peringatan Pembukaan Dewan Tinggi 1939
| Silver Medal | Pingat Peringatan Pembukaan Dewan Tinggi 1939 | P.P.M. | -- | -- | |
Sultan Ibrahim Coronation Medal - Pingat Kemahkotaan Sultan Ibrahim
| Silver Medal | Pingat Kemahkotaan Sultan Ibrahim | P.P.I. | -- | -- | |
Sultan Yahya Petra Coronation Medal - Pingat Kemahkotaan Sultan Yahya Petra
| Gold Medal | Pingat Kemahkotaan Sultan Yahya Petra | -- | -- | -- | |
| Silver Medal | Pingat Kemahkotaan Sultan Yahya Petra | -- | -- | -- | |
Sultan Ismail Petra Coronation Medal - Pingat Kemahkotaan Sultan Ismail Petra
| Gold Medal | Pingat Kemahkotaan Sultan Ismail Petra | -- | -- | -- | |
| Silver Medal | Pingat Kemahkotaan Sultan Ismail Petra | -- | -- | -- | |
Silver Jubilee Medal - Pingat Jubli Perak (reign of Sultan Ismail Petra)
| Gold Medal | Pingat Jubli Perak | P.J.P. | -- | -- | |
| Silver Medal | Pingat Jubli Perak | P.J.P. | -- | -- | |
Meritorious Service Medal - Pingat Kebaktian Perkhidmatan
| Medal | Pingat Kebaktian Perkhidmatan | P.K.P. | -- | -- | |
Sultan Muhammad V Proclamation Medal - Pingat Pemasyhuran Sultan Muhammad V
| Gold Medal | Pingat Pemasyhuran Sultan Muhammad V | -- | -- | -- | |
| Silver Medal | Pingat Pemasyhuran Sultan Muhammad V | -- | -- | -- | |

== See also ==
- Orders, decorations, and medals of Kelantan
- Order of precedence in Kelantan
