= UMNO Youth =

Youth wing of the United Malays National Organisation

UMNO Youth Pergerakan Pemuda UMNO ڤرڬرقن ڤمودا امنو
- Leader: Muhamad Akmal Saleh
- Deputy Leader: Mohd Hairi Mad Shah
- Chairperson: Wan Md Hazlin Agyl Wan Hassan
- Treasurer: Mohd Kurniawan Naim Moktar
- Spokesperson: Mohammad Sollehin Mohamad Tajie
- Founded: 26 August 1949 (77 years, 33 days)
- Headquarters: Tingkat 28, Menara Dato’ Onn, Putra World Trade Centre, Jalan Tun Ismail, 50480 Kuala Lumpur
- Membership: ▲505,903 (2021)
- Ideology: Ketuanan Melayu; Malay nationalism; National conservatism; Social conservatism
- Position: Right-wing
- Colours: Red and white
- Mother party: United Malays National Organisation (UMNO)
- Website: www.pemuda.com.my

The UMNO Youth Movement (Malay: Pergerakan Pemuda UMNO; Jawi: ڤرڬرقن ڤمودا امنو), or simply known as the UMNO Youth, is the youth wing of Malaysia's former ruling party, the United Malays National Organisation (UMNO). The group's membership consists of UMNO members aged 18 to 40, and its establishment was rooted in championing the ethnic causes of the Malay and Bumiputera youth. Since March 2023, the UMNO Youth has been led by Muhamad Akmal Saleh, the Malacca state assemblyman (MLA) for Merlimau.

The UMNO Youth is organised separately from the women's youth wing (Puteri UMNO) and student wing (UMNOSiswa). The youth wing has been characterised as more outspoken and ideologically assertive than the party leadership, particularly under the leadership of Akmal Saleh, who has been associated with a more nationalist and confrontational political style. This approach has contributed to periodic tensions within UMNO regarding the party’s strategic direction, especially over participation in the unity government and cooperation with Pakatan Harapan, particularly its component party, the Democratic Action Party (DAP), which has historically been a political rival of UMNO.

== History ==
=== Establishment ===
The history of the UMNO Youth is closely linked to the broader development of the United Malays National Organisation (UMNO) during the late colonial period in British Malaya. As part of the party’s efforts to strengthen its organisational structure and cultivate future leadership, UMNO established a dedicated youth wing to mobilise younger members and support its nationalist objectives against British colonial rule. The UMNO Youth was formally founded on 26 August 1949 in Butterworth, Penang, during a conference attended by representatives from various state branches.

=== Era of Hussein Onn (1949–1951) ===
The founding conference elected Hussein Onn, son of party founder Onn Jaafar, as the first UMNO Youth Chief, and the organisation became initially known as the UMNO Youth Alliance (Malay: Perikatan Pemuda UMNO).

=== Era of Abdul Razak Hussein (1951) ===
Following Hussein Onn’s appointment as UMNO Secretary-General in August 1950, leadership of the youth wing was assumed by Abdul Razak Hussein of Pekan, Pahang, who continued to develop its organisational role within the party. The slogan changed from "Merdeka" (Independence) to "Hidup Melayu" (Long Live the Malays), reflecting the movement's evolving focus from the struggle for independence to the advocacy of Malay rights and socio-economic interests in the post-colonial period.

=== Era of Sardon Jubir (1951–1964) ===
During the era of Tun Sardon Jubir, the slogans "Pemuda Tahan Lasak" (Tough Youth) and "Revolusi Mental" (Mental Revolution) were introduced. His wife was a Chinese woman. This period coincided with the Indonesia–Malaysia confrontation and the Expulsion of Singapore from Malaysia. In December 1955, as a result of amendments to the UMNO Constitution, the name of the UMNO Youth Alliance was changed to the UMNO Youth Movement.

=== Era of Senu Abdul Rahman (1964–1971) ===
Senu continued the policies set by Sardon. A significant challenge he faced was when Singapore sought to exit Malaysia. Statements by Lee Kuan Yew questioning the special status of the indigenous Malays (Bumiputera) had angered the Malay community. The UMNO Youth passed a resolution urging the federal government to take action against Lee Kuan Yew. However, Singapore would subsequently leave the federation in 1965.

=== Era of Harun Idris (1971–1976) ===
Datuk Harun Idris served as the Menteri Besar Selangor and was an aggressive leader of UMNO Youth. His strident Malay nationalism contributed to a loss of Chinese voter support for the ruling Perikatan coalition, weakening its position in Selangor and contributing to the racial tensions that culminated in the 13 May incident in 1969. He was revered by Malay nationalists for his efforts to uplift poor rural Malays by facilitating their migration to urban areas for work and residence alongside the Chinese. This period also saw the launch of the New Economic Policy (NEP), aimed at enlarging the economic pie and ensuring a more equitable distribution of wealth among ethnic groups.

=== Era of Syed Jaafar Albar (1976–1977) ===
Syed Jaafar Albar, originally from Johor and of Arab descent, was a fiery orator. He was often mocked by Lee Kuan Yew of the PAP for also being of immigrant stock. Jaafar Albar was so fierce in his advocacy that he was nicknamed the "Lion of UMNO," and he referred to UMNO Youth as the "Ginger Group." Nevertheless, his prominence was eclipsed by the charisma of Datuk Harun Idris.

=== Era of Suhaimi Kamarudin (1977–1982) ===
Suhaimi Kamaruddin, the nephew of Datuk Harun Idris from Selangor, was expected to be as radical as his uncle. The slogan "Pemuda Bertindak" (Youth in Action) was adopted. In his bid to defend his position as UMNO Youth Chief against challenger Datuk Seri Anwar Ibrahim, Suhaimi proposed raising the Bumiputera equity target from 30% to 53%. However, this was not well-received even within the UMNO Youth, as the 30% target had yet to be achieved. Consequently, members voted for Anwar Ibrahim, who was seen as the protégé of Prime Minister Mahathir Mohamad.

=== Era of Anwar Ibrahim (1982–1987) ===
The tenure of Anwar Ibrahim as the UMNO Youth Chief is widely regarded as a transformative period in the wing's history, marked by a significant ideological shift and institutional reform. Anwar's leadership represented a political synthesis of Islamic revivalism, Malay nationalism, and progressive internationalism, fundamentally altering the movement's character and reach.

Anwar entered UMNO in 1982 at the direct invitation of Prime Minister Mahathir Mohamad, a move seen as a co-optation of the Islamic intellectual movement into the ruling party's fold. Before this, Anwar was the president and a prominent leader of the Malaysian Islamic Youth Movement (ABIM), a nationwide Islamic youth organisation known for its social activism and critique of government policies, which led to his detention under the Internal Security Act (ISA) from 1974-1975. His recruitment into UMNO was seen as bridging the party's secular-nationalist base with the rising tide of Islamic consciousness amongst the educated Malay youth.

Anwar's decision to accept Mahathir's invitation to join UMNO signified Mahathir's foresight in channelling Islamic revivalism into the ruling party and Anwar's pragmatic belief that substantive change could only be achieved from within the power structure. His entry slogan, "Masuk UMNO, Teruskan Perjuangan" (Join UMNO, Continue the Struggle), was aimed directly at his ABIM constituency, assuring them that his ideological mission remained intact.

Anwar's vision for UMNO Youth was a sophisticated synthesis of three core streams:

- Islamic Ethics and Governance: He infused the movement with the language of moral governance (siyasah shar'iyyah), anti-corruption, and social welfare, drawn from his ABIM background. He argued that development must be spiritually meaningful and ethically grounded.
- Reformist Malay Economic Nationalism: He firmly upheld the movement's traditional role in championing Malay economic advancement and the New Economic Policy (NEP), but framed it within a context of creating a competitive, learned, and ethical Bumiputera community, not merely a recipient of quotas.
- Progressive Internationalism: He connected the UMNO Youth to global intellectual currents, engaging with debates on democracy, development in the Muslim world, and post-colonial discourse. Under his direction, the movement actively cultivated relationships with youth wings of ruling and opposition parties across the Islamic world and in the Non-Aligned Movement, elevating its international profile.

This tripartite ideology was encapsulated in his landmark slogan for the wing: "Generasi Penggerak Zaman" (The Generation that Moves the Times). It called for the youth to be proactive, intellectual, and morally principled leaders of change, rather than just political foot soldiers.

The UMNO Youth's approach was also revolutionised from within. Anwar introduced regular Quranic study circles (usrah) and intellectual discourse sessions (fiqh al-harakah) into wing activities, emphasising the integration of religious learning with political activism. He also established closer ties with university students and graduates, launching programs emphasising academic excellence, critical thinking, and technological literacy, such as early initiatives on information technology. Consequently, he actively recruited doctors, engineers, lawyers, and academics into the wing, broadening its social base beyond traditional party apparatchiks and creating an internal think-tank culture focused on policy.

While Prime Minister Mahathir launched the "Buy British Last" policy, Anwar's tenure was itself marked by several assertive actions. In 1984, Anwar led the UMNO Youth in a highly publicised "occupation" of the British High Commissioner's residence, the Carcosa Seri Negara, in a dramatic act of symbolic nationalism. Framed as reclaiming a vestige of colonialism, the action garnered significant popular support but was criticised by some as reckless populism. Anwar also organised the 1985 Bumiputera Economic Congress (BEC), using the platform to deliver a landmark address where he pushed for a "second stage" of the NEP. He criticised rent-seeking and dependency, calling for a shift from "ownership" to "managerial control" and the creation of a genuine Bumiputera entrepreneurial class with "global competitiveness."

By 1987, Anwar's influence had grown exponentially, becoming the de facto leader of the reformist Team Wawasan faction aligned with Mahathir. The faction pressured him to contest the UMNO Vice-Presidency in the 1987 UMNO General Assembly, seeing it as a necessary step in his rapid rise. His agreement led to the handover of the Youth Chief post to his protégé and deputy, Najib Razak, on 24 April 1987. The transition was staged to show continuity and the anointing of a successor from his own reformist camp, ensuring the succession remained within his ideological circle.

Anwar Ibrahim's era fundamentally altered the trajectory of the UMNO Youth. He successfully, if temporarily, merged Islamic moral discourse with modernist development agendas, creating a potent political language that appealed to an increasingly Islamic generation. The wing was transformed from a primarily communal pressure group into a movement with intellectual aspirations and a broader socio-religious agenda. His legacy is dual-edged: he is remembered as the most ideologically distinctive and transformative Youth Chief who expanded the wing's horizons, but also as the figure whose meteoric rise and later dramatic fall would, decades later, contribute to profound schisms within UMNO itself.

=== Era of Najib Razak (1987–1993) ===
Following the ascension of Anwar Ibrahim to the party vice-presidency in 1987, Najib Razak, son of Prime Minister Abdul Razak Hussein, took over the post of UMNO Youth chief. He had previously served as Deputy Youth Chief for three terms under Datuk Suhaimi Kamaruddin and two terms under Datuk Seri Anwar Ibrahim. His tenure coincided with Operation Lalang, a major crackdown on dissent under the Internal Security Act. In the lead up to the 1987 party elections, UMNO's leadership had split into Team A, led by Mahathir Mohamad, and Team B, led by Tengku Razaleigh Hamzah. After an election campaign marred by rigging allegations, a narrow victory for Mahathir by a majority of 43 votes saw his faction sweeping most contested positions, leading to the dissenting "Kumpulan 11" (Group of 11) to challenge the party election results. On 4 February 1988, Justice Harun Hashim of the Kuala Lumpur High Court declared UMNO as unlawful due to breaches of the Societies Act, effectively rendering UMNO and its Youth wing defunct. UMNO Baru (New UMNO) was established on 13 February 1988, and the word 'Baru' was soon dropped. On 21 May 1988, Najib officially returned as the UMNO Youth Chief.

=== Era of Rahim Thamby Chik (1993–1996) ===
The 1993 UMNO General Assembly saw the election of Abdul Rahim Thamby Chik as leader of the UMNO Youth following the ascendancy of Najib Razak to the party vice-presidency. His tenure saw a period of assertive Malay nationalism aligned with the modernising vision of Prime Minister Mahathir Mohamad. However, it was also marked by significant political controversy.

Abdul Rahim, who simultaneously served as the Chief Minister of Malacca (1982–1994), leveraged his dual roles to champion Bumiputera economic agendas and socio-political issues. Under his leadership, the UMNO Youth adopted a posture as the vigilant guardian of Malay rights and Islamic values within the framework of Malaysia's rapid industrialisation. A key policy moment during his era was the 1995 Bumiputera Economic Congress (BEC), where the UMNO Youth, under Rahim's guidance, pushed for a critical review of the New Economic Policy (NEP). He argued that the NEP's focus should evolve from a static 30% Bumiputera equity target to a more dynamic approach emphasising wealth creation, competitiveness, and the development of a robust Bumiputera commercial and industrial community (BCIC).

His tenure was notably confrontational on social and political issues. Rahim Thamby Chik was a prominent advocate for moral policing and often spoke against what he perceived as "Western decadence." However, his career was abruptly derailed by a major scandal in 1994. He was accused of statutory rape involving a 15-year-old schoolgirl. The allegations triggered a national uproar and a police investigation. Although he was never formally charged, with the Attorney-General's Chambers stating there was "insufficient evidence", the political damage was severe. He resigned from his position as Chief Minister of Malacca in October 1994 amidst the controversy. Despite the scandal, he retained the position of UMNO Youth Chief until the end of his term in 1996.

=== Era of Ahmad Zahid Hamidi (1996–1998) ===
Abdul Rahim was succeeded by Ahmad Zahid Hamidi, who took over following the 1996 UMNO General Assembly. He inherited a movement that was politically forceful but also divided in the aftermath of controversy. At the time, Zahid was known to be aligned with Anwar Ibrahim, a relationship lasting to the present day when he brought UMNO to support Anwar as Prime Minister in 2022, himself serving as Deputy Prime Minister in Anwar's administration.

During his tenure as Youth Chief, issues of cronyism, collusion, and nepotism (KKN) became common subjects of scepticism and jokes at UMNO assemblies. Following the schism between Anwar Ibrahim and Mahathir Mohamad, the latter, as UMNO President, publicly listed UMNO members and companies that had received government tenders, shares, and board appointments. Names like Ahmad Zahid and other vocal critics of Mahathir were included, though the list was disputed for being incomplete with allegations of it being politically motivated.

=== Era of Hishammuddin Hussein (1999–2009) ===
Following the decision of Ahmad Zahid to contest for the party's Supreme Council, the young leader Hishammuddin Hussein, son of Prime Minister Hussein Onn, succeeded him in 2004. He previously held the prestigious cabinet position of Minister of Youth and Sports (KBS) and Minister of Education (KPM) prior to his election. His tenure is notably remembered for his symbolic waving of the kris (traditional dagger) at the 2005 UMNO General Assembly, a controversial gesture interpreted as a strong assertion of Malay nationalism.

=== Era of Khairy Jamaluddin (2009–2018) ===
During the 2009 UMNO General Assembly, Khairy Jamaluddin, son-in-law of Prime Minister Abdullah Ahmad Badawi, was elected as the new UMNO Youth Chief. He faced the heavy responsibility of restoring the confidence of young voters in the Barisan Nasional coalition, especially following the party's massive losses in the 2008 general election. Under his father-in-law's leadership, the party lost 58 seats and 12.86 percent of the popular vote in the election, including the fall of five states to the Pakatan Rakyat opposition. His biggest challenge was overcoming image problems stemming from money politics allegations he faced during the 2009 Youth Chief election. Despite this, he was credited with modernising the wing's outreach and engaging more directly with youth issues.

=== Era of Asyraf Wajdi Dusuki (2018–2023) ===
Asyraf Wajdi Dusuki was elected as the new UMNO Youth Chief on 30 June 2018, following Barisan Nasional's historic loss in the 14th General Election. A former Senator and Deputy Minister in the Prime Minister's Department (Religious Affairs), he had lost in his run for parliament during the election. Coming from a politically Islamic background and seen as aligned with Anwar Ibrahim, he led the wing from 2018 to 2023, succeeding Khairy Jamaluddin during a period of significant opposition and rebuilding for UMNO.

=== Era of Muhamad Akmal Saleh (2023–Present) ===
Muhamad Akmal Saleh, the ADUN for Merlimau from Malacca, was elected to the position of UMNO Youth Chief on 11 March 2023. His leadership slogan is "Pemuda Cara Kita" (Youth, Our Way). He represents a new generation of leadership tasked with reinvigorating the wing ahead of the 16th General Election, focusing on grassroots engagement and issues affecting young Malaysians.

== Party symbols ==
=== Anthem ===
The official anthem of the UMNO Youth is Ikrar Pemuda (Oath of the Youth).

Ikrar Pemuda

Kami pemuda Malaysia,
Bersatu dan padu tenaga,
Berjuang berkorban jiwa raga,
Untuk ketahanan bangsa.

Pemuda harapan negara,
Membela dan membuat jasa,
Membina negara kaya raya,
Ibu pertiwi Malaysia.

Mari kita bersatu dan berikrar,
Mengaku dan bersumpah,
Menjunjung agama bangsa negara,
Bersungguh dan setia.

Kami pemuda Malaysia,
Merupakan benteng yang waja,
Pertahan kedaulatan agama,
Serta bangsa dan negara.

Translation:
We are the youth of Malaysia,
United in strength and energy,
Struggling and sacrificing our lives,
For the survival of our race.

Youth, the hope of this nation,
Defend and serve with dedication,
Build a prosperous land of wealth,
Our motherland, Malaysia.

Come, let us unite and pledge,
Declare our oath and swear our vows,
Upholding faith, race, and nation,
With an earnest loyalty.

We are the youth of Malaysia,
A fortress firm and strong,
Defend the sovereignty of faith,
And of our race and nation.

== Organisational structure ==
The UMNO Youth Movement was established over the party’s recognition of the need for a dedicated youth wing to support and develop future leadership within UMNO. The movement serves as a platform for grooming potential leaders, with members expected to demonstrate commitment and leadership capabilities at the youth level before assuming positions within the wider party structure. In this regard, UMNO Youth functions as an integral component of the party’s organisational framework. The wing has also been noted for its role in articulating sensitive or controversial issues, reflecting the comparatively assertive and activist orientation commonly associated with youth organisations.

=== Hierarchy ===
The UMNO Youth is led by the youth chief, followed by the vice youth chief and 20 youth executive committee members or "EXCOs" which all are elected through UMNO party elections. The youth chief would then have the executive power to appoint the secretary, treasurer, information chief, executive secretary and up to 15 youth EXCOs. There are other positions such as permanent chairman and deputy permanent chairman who holds less executive power within the youth wing where they are in charge of chairing the annual UMNO general assembly or Perhimpunan Agung UMNO (PAU) for the youth wing.

All of the positions mentioned are apparent in various levels, which it can be present at branch level (Malay: Cawangan), followed with divisional (Malay: Bahagian), to state (Malay: Negeri), and finally national (Malay: Pusat). Oftentimes, most national youth leaders hold divisional posts. For example, Muhamad Akmal Saleh and Nazif Najib are both division heads of their respective constituencies, and various national youth EXCOs are also youth division heads. In order to hold divisional, state or national level positions, all youth leaders must first hold branch level positions beforehand.

=== Current leadership ===
The list below shows the current 2023/2026 UMNO Youth leadership.

UMNO Youth Malaysia
Position	Name	Appointments
Permanent Chairman	Wan Md Hazlin Agyl Wan Hassan	
Deputy Permanent Chairman	Zairul Azmir Ramli	
Youth Chief	Muhamad Akmal Saleh	MLA for Merlimau
Vice Youth Chief	Mohd Hairi Mad Shah	MLA for Larkin
Secretary	Mohd Hafiz Ariffin	
Treasurer	Mohd Kurniawan Naim Moktar	MP for Kinabatangan
Information Chief	Mohammad Sollehin Mohamad Tajie	
Youth EXCO
Elected	Mohd Hafiz Ariffin	
Elected	Mohamed Khairul Azman Abdul Azeez	
Elected	Fikhran Hamshi Mohamad Fatmi	
Elected	Shah Zanuriman Nuar Paras Khan	
Elected	Md Fadzmel Md Fadzil	
Elected	Shahrul Nasrun Kamarudin	
Elected	Mohd Kalam Ulum Morsin	
Elected	Mohd Syauqi Ibnihajar Ahmad	
Elected	Mohammad Sollehin Mohamad Tajie	
Elected	Ahmad Zaim Ahmad Tawfek	
Elected	Mohamad Aliff Hilmi	
Elected	Muhamad Nur Aizat Noor Azam	
Elected	Mohd Rafiq Mohd	
Elected	Muhammad Saifullah Ali	
Elected	Mohd Asyraf Zainal	
Elected	Hasry Sham Chasmen	
Elected	Mohd Saiful Mat Sapri	
Elected	Mohd Fadini Rahim	
Elected	Aznan Tamin	MLA for Tanjung Surat
Elected	Md Jamil Pauzi	
Appointed	Mohd Nazifuddin Mohd Najib	
Appointed	Tengku Muhammed Hafiz Tengku Adnan	
Appointed	Mohd Afzan Manaf	
Appointed	Muhammad Fadlan Aiman Mhd Fadly	
Appointed	Abdul Azim Abdullah	
Appointed	Arsad Mohammad Yusof	
Appointed	Mohd Rozaini Mohd Rasli	
Appointed	Suhaimizan Bizar	MLA for Gemencheh
Appointed	Mohamad Arif Abdul Talib	
Appointed	Mohamad Faiz Abdullah	
Appointed	Fariz Hazurin Ismail	
Appointed	Wan Muhammad Zuhir Ghazali	
Appointed	Syed Hussien Syed Abdullah	MLA for Mahkota
Executive Secretary	A'zlan Abu Bakar	

State Youth Leaders
State	Name	Appointments
Perlis	Saiful Fariddil Jasmi	
Kedah	Mohd Raqib Abu Hassan	
Perak	Nazirul Jamaluddin	
Kelantan	Mohd Azmawi Fikri Abdul Ghani	MLA for Nenggiri
Terengganu	Tengku Haphiz Tengku Putera	
Pahang	Mohd Kamil Ibrahim	
Selangor	Mohd Imran Tamrin	
Federal Territories	Aliff Firdaus Abd Hadi	
Negeri Sembilan	Mohamad Fadil Md Zin	
Malacca	Abdul Hakim Abdul Wahid	
Johor	Noor Azleen Ambros	
Sabah	Sufian Abd Karim	

== Leadership ==
=== Youth Chief ===
The Youth Chief of UMNO acts as the penultimate leader of the party's youth wing where it holds comparable authority to the President, only being limited to the youth wing. Throughout Malaysian political history, four former Youth Chiefs of UMNO, which are Hussein Onn, Abdul Razak Hussein, Najib Razak, and Anwar Ibrahim, went on to serve as the Prime Minister of Malaysia.

No.	Image	Youth chief	Term start	Term end
1		Hussein Onn	1949	1951
2		Abdul Razak Hussein	1951	1951
3		Sardon Jubir	1951	1964
4		Senu Abdul Rahman	1964	1971
5		Harun Idris	1971	1976
6		Syed Jaafar Albar	1976	1977
7		Suhaimi Kamaruddin	1977	1982
8	Cohen Anwar 980416 (cropped 3to4)	Anwar Ibrahim	1982	1987
9	Najib crop	Najib Razak	1987	1993
10		Rahim Thamby Chik	1993	1996
Acting		Mohamed Nazri Abdul Aziz	1994	1996
11	Ahmad Zahid (cropped, 4to3)	Ahmad Zahid Hamidi	1996	1998
12		Hishammuddin Hussein	1999	2009
13		Khairy Jamaluddin	26 March 2009	24 June 2018
14		Asyraf Wajdi Dusuki	24 June 2018	11 March 2023
15		Muhamad Akmal Saleh	12 March 2023	Incumbent

== See also ==
- United Malays National Organisation
- President of the United Malays National Organisation
- ARMADA BERSATU, the youth wing of the Malaysian United Indigenous Party (BERSATU)
