= Wan Muhammad Azri Wan Deris =

Malaysian politician, blogger and policeman

- وان محمد أزري وان دريس
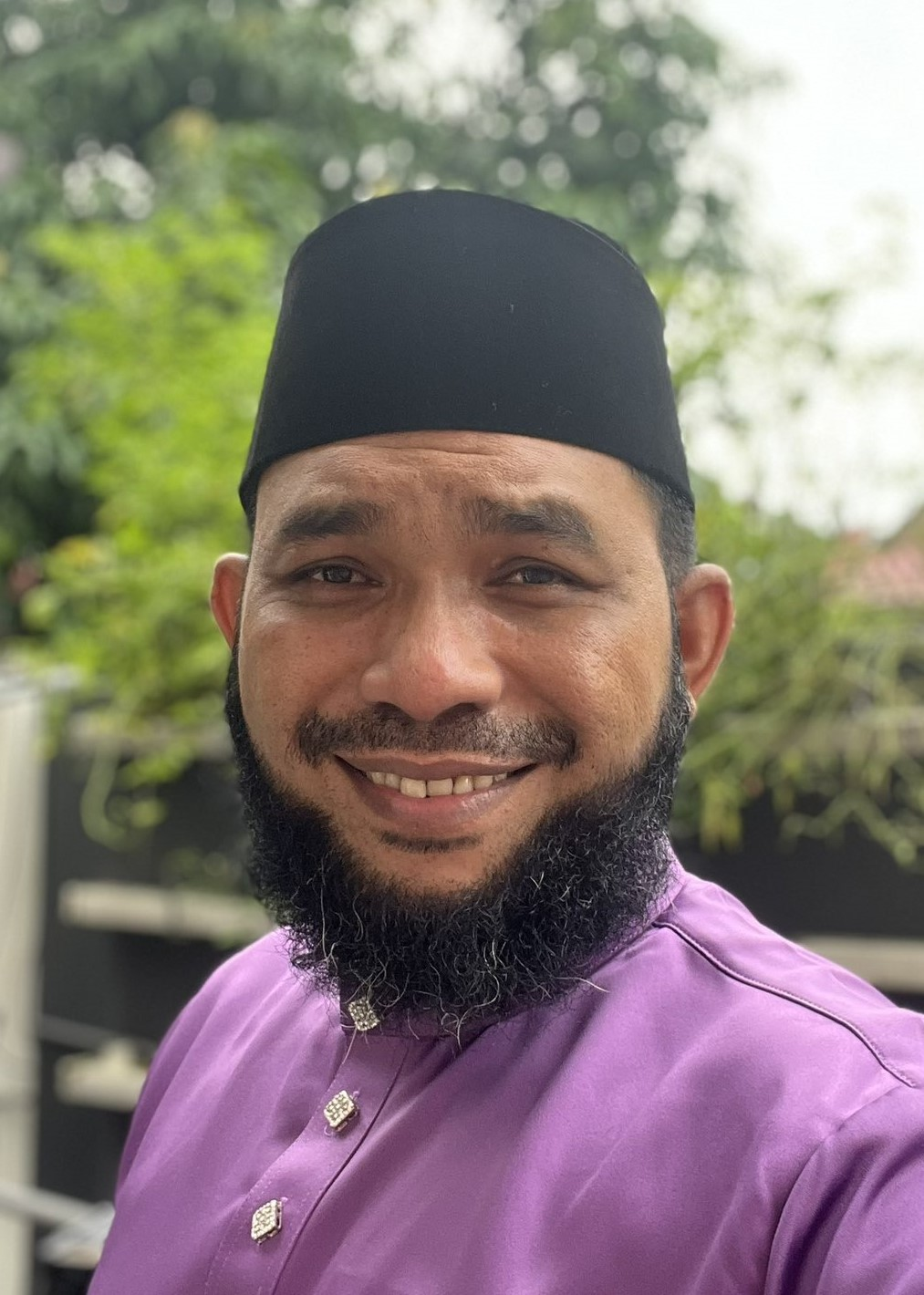
- Wan Muhammad Azri in 2024

Member of the UMNO Youth Committee
- In office 24 June 2018 – 27 August 2021
- President: Ahmad Zahid Hamidi
- Youth Chief: Asyraf Wajdi Dusuki

UMNO Committee Members of the Wangsa Maju Division
- In office 19 October 2013 – 30 June 2018
- Division Head: Mohd Shafei Abdullah

Personal details
- Born: Wan Muhammad Azri bin Wan Deris; January 21, 1983 (age 43) Kampung Sungai Petai, Pasir Puteh, Kelantan, Malaysia
- Party: United Malays National Organisation (UMNO) (2008–2021)
- Other political affiliations: Barisan Nasional (BN) (2008–2021)
- Spouse(s): Bellina Omar Shaifuddin Chin (m. 2006; div. 2012) Rosnah Sarah Syazwanie Arafah (m. 2012)
- Children: 5
- Education: ~~Universiti Teknologi MARA (Dip)~~ (Note: Wan Muhammad Azri quit after only successfully completing only for one semester, therefore not completing his diploma studies at UiTM.)
- Occupation: Politician, blogger, policeman
- Nicknames: Papagomo; Sir Azri

Wan Muhammad Azri bin Wan Deris (Jawi: وان محمد أزري بن وان دريس; born 21 January 1983), better known by the nickname Papagomo or Sir Azri, is a Malaysian politician, blogger and former policeman who served as the committee member of the UMNO Youth Movement from June 2018 to August 2021 and UMNO Committee Member of the Wangsa Maju Division from October 2013 to June 2018. However, he was suspended from UMNO in August 2021 for six years after being found to have violated the party constitution.

Wan Muhammad Azri attracted the attention of many parties for causing various controversies and issues. He is known as a pro-Perikatan Nasional political activist and close supporters of the former Malaysian Prime Minister, Mahathir Mohamad, as well as criticizing the leadership of the Malaysian prime minister, Anwar Ibrahim, together with his friends, Badrul Hisham Shaharin (Chegubard) and Mohamad Salim Iskandar (Parpukari).

He is often known by the name Papagomo, which is the name of the writer of a Malaysian political blog. He denied being the writer of the blog but in 2014 it was confirmed by a written reply in Parliament as well as by testimony in a defamation suit.

== Early life and education ==
Wan Muhammad Azri bin Wan Deris was born in Kampung Sungai Petai, Pasir Puteh, Kelantan, Malaysia on 21 January 1983. He grew up in Kampung Pasir, Johor Bahru, Johor, Malaysia. The highest education that he had is the Sijil Pelajaran Malaysia (SPM). He later continued his studies at the Universiti Teknologi MARA (UiTM) in Diploma of Public Administration through distance studies (e-PJJ) in 2004, but did not managed to finished it because he quit after only successfully completing only for one semester.

== Police career ==
Wan Muhammad Azri was once a member of the police. He once held the rank of constable and served at the Ampang Jaya District Police Headquarters from 1 July 2002 until 30 November 2004 when he was arrested for the criminal offence of extorting money from the public. After being found guilty, Wan Muhammad Azri was sentenced and subjected to disciplinary action and expelled from PDRM on 6 September 2012.

== Political career ==
Wan Muhammad Azri is a member of the United Malays National Organization (UMNO) and Barisan Nasional (BN) since 2008. He was successful in the 2013 UMNO election as a committee member (AJK) of the Wangsa Maju UMNO Division. He held the position for almost five years, from 19 October 2013 until 30 June 2018.

He was appointed as the committee member of the UMNO Youth Movement on 24 June 2018. This is because he managed to get 16th place in the 2018 UMNO election in vying for the position of a member of the Malaysian UMNO Youth Committee. However, he was suspended from membership for six years by UMNO starting 27 August 2021 for criticizing President of UMNO at the time, Ahmad Zahid Hamidi. This matter was informed through a letter dated 1 September 2021 signed by the then secretary-general of UMNO, Ahmad Maslan.

== Controversies and issues ==
=== Rosmah Mansor's mercenary cyber army ===
At the corruption trial of Rosmah Mansor, wife of the 6th Malaysian Prime Minister, Rosmah's former special officer, Rizal Mansor has told the court that three bloggers, Wan Muhammad Azri (Papagomo), Mohamad Salim Iskandar (Parpukari) and The Unspinners (Note: The real identity is unknown.) was hired by Rosmah to highlight her image and good reputation on social media platforms. Rizal added that the three bloggers received a payment of RM5,000 per month out of an allocation of RM100,000 for almost six years starting in 2012 until the fall of the Barisan Nasional government in 2018. "They are among the three or four leaders of the army cyber. There were also 12 to 15 bloggers who were paid around RM3,000 and about 30 Facebookers who were all paid around RM2,000 over the six-year period," he said. The 21st prosecution witness testified at the trial of the wife of former Prime Minister Najib Razak who is facing one charge of asking for RM187.5 million and two charges of accepting a bribe amounting to RM6.5 million from the former Managing Director of Jepak Holdings, Saidi Brother Samsudin.

=== Defamation against Anwar Ibrahim ===
On February 28, 2014, the Kuala Lumpur High Court affirmed Wan Muhammad Azri Wan Deris’s identity as that of Papagomo and ruled that he had maliciously defamed PKR President Anwar Ibrahim.

This came after he was deemed to have published doctored pictures of the opposition leader in a compromising position with another man prior to the 2013 general election. The court ordered him to pay Anwar RM800,000 in damages.

On Dec 4, 2015, the decision was upheld by the Appeals Court.

Following Papagomo’s failure to pay the sum, the High Court set a deadline of Dec 4, 2017 for him to pay a sum of RM951,000 in accrued damages.

=== Assault against foreign worker ===
In March 2016, he was fined RM4,300 for an assault on a foreign worker at a mall in Wangsa Maju. He claimed that the man had made a lewd gesture towards his sister and filmed himself carrying out the attack.

=== Violence against Syed Saddiq Syed Abdul Rahman ===
Before the 2019 Semenyih by-election, on 16 February 2019, Syed Saddiq Syed Abdul Rahman made a report claiming to have been choked in an incident after the completion of the candidate nomination process at Dewan Sri Cempaka, Kajang Municipal Council (MPKj). On 21 February, a day after Wan Muhammad Azri was released on police bail, he filed a police report against Syed Saddiq for allegedly making a false report against him.

Wan Muhammad Azri has been accused of committing violence against Syed Saddiq on the side of Persiaran Impian Perdana, Saujana Impian at 11:05 am, 16 February 2019. The accusation states that he said disrespectful and insulting words such as "you idiot" (Malay: kau bodoh!) on Syed Saddiq where the peace may be disturbed. Furthermore, he is also accused of inflicting injuries on Syed Saddiq on the neck and shoulder, at the same place, date and time. Wan Muhammad Azri was charged in the Kajang magistrate court under Section 14 of the Minor Offenses Act 1955 and Section 323 of the Penal Code for both offences.

On 12 September 2024, Wan Muhammad Azri was fined a total of RM2,100 by the magistrate court after being found guilty of two charges of causing injury and uttering the word "stupid" (Malay: bodoh) to Syed Saddiq. The RM2,100 fine consists of a fine of RM2,000 for the offense of causing injury, and another fine of RM100 for uttering the said words against Syed Saddiq. Magistrate Muhammad Noor Firdaus Rosli decided the sentence after finding that the defense failed to raise doubts in the final stage of their case.

=== Allegations against SKMM officials ===
Malaysian Communications and Multimedia Commission (SKMM) made a police report on 19 April 2024 against Wan Muhammad Azri, Badrul Hisham Shaharin (Chegubard) and Mohamad Salim Iskandar (Parpukari) for allegedly making and spreading false accusations against SKMM officials. The police report was made by the MCMC based on the content uploaded by the three individuals in the social media platforms TikTok, Facebook and YouTube on 17 April 2024. The uploaded content depicted as if SKMM officials act under instructions that have political interests, in addition to being abuse of power.

=== Accusations of defrauding public funds ===
Wan Muhammad Azri was arrested at his residence on 13 December 2024 by a team of police officers who came to his residence in three police vehicles to help investigate a case of fraud in the collection of public funds by using the name of a company. The arrest was made by a team of members of the Bukit Aman Money Laundering Crime Investigation Team (AMLA) early in the morning that day. The arrest was made following a police report made by the Minister of Economy, Rafizi Ramli last July. Malaysian Police Chief, Tan Sri Razarudin Husain has confirmed the arrest and informed that the investigation is being carried out in accordance with Section 420 of the Penal Code. Wan Muhammad Azri was released after giving a statement to the police the next day.

=== Defamation suit by the IGP Razarudin ===
Malaysian Police Chief, Razarudin Husain filed a lawsuit against Wan Muhammad Azri for labeling him a prostitute to and a flatterer of Prime Minister Anwar Ibrahim. Razarudin as the plaintiff sued him regarding his statement uploaded through a video on YouTube and TikTok in addition to being spread through other social media channels. Lawyer Raam Kumar who represents Razarudin said that the notice of claim was filed on 26 December 2024 in the High Court through Messrs. Messrs. Kbtan, Kumar & Partners. The plaintiff will claim damages for verbal defamation, written defamation damages, general damages, aggravated or exemplary damages and special damages. The plaintiff also demanded that the defendant retract the defamatory statement or delete and destroy all videos, publications and messages or materials that are defamatory by the defendant.

On 19 December, Razarudin confirmed that the blogger involved was interviewed at the Setapak Police Station regarding a defamatory and humiliating video about him and the Royal Malaysian Police (PDRM) that was uploaded on YouTube. The case is investigated in accordance with Section 14 of the Minor Offenses Act, Sections 500 and 504 of the Penal Code and Section 233 of the Communications and Multimedia Act 1998.

=== Sedition against the King ===
On March 30, 2026, he was fined RM4,000 by the Kuala Lumpur Sessions Court for one count under Section 4(1) of the Sedition Act 1948.

Wan Muhammad Azri was found guilty of inciting hatred against the King, his Majesty Sultan Ibrahim regarding a social media post on April 29, 2024 about a royal audience with the owner of the KK Mart chain.

=== Defamation suit by Communications Minister ===
On April 6, 2026 Wan Muhammad Azri and Communications Minister Fahmi Fadzil settled a defamation suit over his allegations that Fahmi gave a political speech at a mosque.

Fahmi’s lawyer, Asheeq Ali Sethi Alivi told a press conference that Papagomo had agreed that his speech at Masjid Nurul Yaqin, Kuang, Rawang, Selangor, on July 30, 2023, was not a political campaign or a politically motivated statement. Wan Muhammad Azri even admitted that it was an error that should not have happened.

The next day Fahmi said that his legal team would review belligerent and contradictory overnight social media posts by Papagomo and assess whether they violated the terms of the agreement in court.

== Personal life ==
Wan Muhammad Azri married Bellina Omar Shaifuddin Chin on 25 February 2006 and was blessed with two daughters, namely Wan Cassandra Wan Muhammad Azri and Wan Camillea Wan Muhammad Azri. However, they both got divorced on 24 September 2012.

Wan Muhammad Azri married Rosnah Sarah Syazwanie Arafah on 27 October 2012 and was blessed with three children. He, his wife and five children now live in Setapak, Kuala Lumpur, Malaysia.

== Honours ==
=== Honour of Malaysia ===
- Federal Territory (Malaysia)
  - ~~Companion of the Order of the Territorial Crown (JMW)~~ (2021) (Note: Wan Muhammad Azri was offered the Companion of the Order of the Territorial Crown (JMW) award by the Minister of Federal Territories at that time, Annuar Musa which will be awarded on the 2021 Federal Territories Day. However, he later rejected the offer.)
