= Next UMNO leadership election =

Election in a political party in Malaysia

2027 United Malays National Organisation leadership election
- 2030
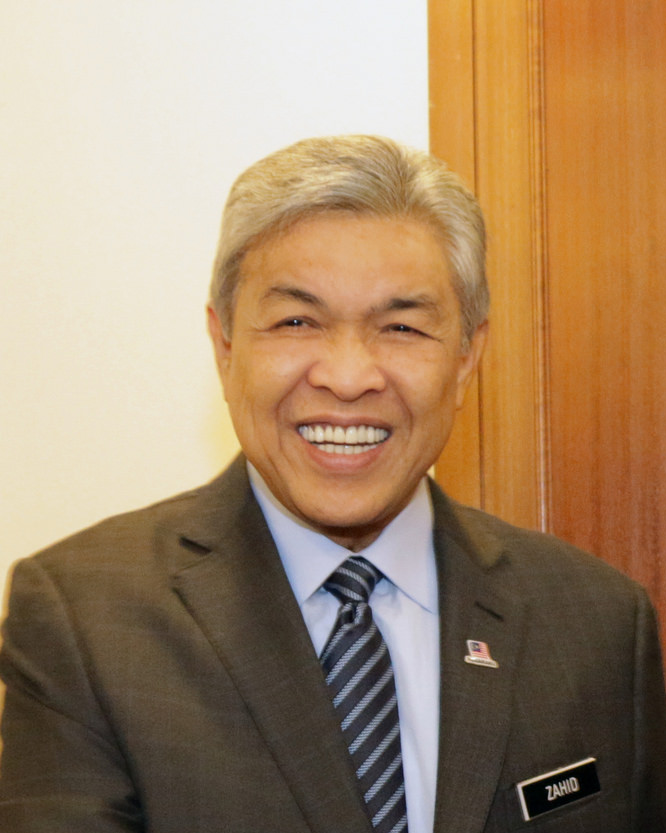
Nominee	Ahmad Zahid Hamidi
Electoral vote	TBA
President of UMNO before election
Ahmad Zahid Hamidi
President of UMNO after election
TBA

A leadership election will be held by the United Malays National Organisation (UMNO) party on 2027.

== Background ==
President of UMNO, Ahmad Zahid Hamidi said that he's open to allowing the two top positions in the party to be contested in the 2027 UMNO leadership election, but stressed the importance of strengthening the party first. The decision on whether the positions of UMNO President and Deputy President will be contested will be made by the UMNO Supreme Working Council and the UMNO General Assembly, in compliance with the party's constitution and regulations.

UMNO Pandan Tengah has recommended to the party leadership that the 2027 UMNO elections should not be postponed. Head of the Pandan Tengah UMNO Branch and Pandan Division UMNO Committee Member, Syed Rosli Jamalullail, said the proposal was agreed to in a recent party meeting.

== Supreme Council election results ==
=== Permanent Chairman ===
No.	Candidate	Division won	Delegates' votes
01	Badruddin Amiruldin	TBA	

=== Deputy Permanent Chairman ===
No.	Candidate	Division won	Delegates' votes
01	Abdul Fattah Abdullah	TBA	

=== President ===
No.	Candidate	Division won	Delegates' votes
01	Ahmad Zahid Hamidi	TBA	

=== Deputy President ===
No.	Candidate	Division won	Delegates' votes
01	Mohamad Hasan	TBA	

=== Vice Presidents ===
No.	Candidate	Division won	Delegates' votes
01	Wan Rosdy Wan Ismail	TBA	
02	Mohamed Khaled Nordin	TBA	
03	Johari Abdul Ghani	TBA	

=== Supreme Council Members ===
No.	Candidate	Division won	Delegates' votes
01	Shamsul Anuar Nasarah	TBA	
02	Zambry Abdul Kadir	TBA	
03	Ahmad Maslan	TBA	
04	Tengku Zafrul Aziz	TBA	
05	Bung Moktar Radin	TBA	
06	Ahmad Jazlan Yaakub	TBA	
07	Abdul Azeez Abdul Rahim	TBA	
08	Shahaniza Shamsuddin	TBA	
09	Azian Osman	TBA	
10	Md Alwi Che Ahmad	TBA	
11	Shaik Hussein Mydin	TBA	
12	Zahida Zarik Khan	TBA	
13	Mohd Razlan Muhammad Rafii	TBA	
14	Mohd Sharkar Shamsudin	TBA	
15	Abdul Rahman Mohamad	TBA	
16	Mohd Puad Zarkashi	TBA	
17	Jamil Khir Baharom	TBA	
18	Johan Abd Aziz	TBA	
19	Hizatul Isham Abdul Jalil	TBA	
20	Abdul Rahman Dahlan	TBA	
21	Lokman Noor Adam	TBA	
22	Ahmad Said	TBA	
23	Rosnah Abdul Rashid Shirlin	TBA	
24	Mohd Rafi Ali Hassan	TBA	
25	Abdul Razak Abdul Rahman	TBA	

== See also ==
- President of UMNO
- Anwar Ibrahim cabinet
- 2023 UMNO leadership election
- UMNO leadership elections
