= President of UMNO =

Highest position politician within the United Malays National Organisation

President of the United Malays National Organisation
- Presiden Pertubuhan Kebangsaan Melayu Bersatu ڤريسيدن ڤرتوبوهن كبڠسأن ملايو برساتو

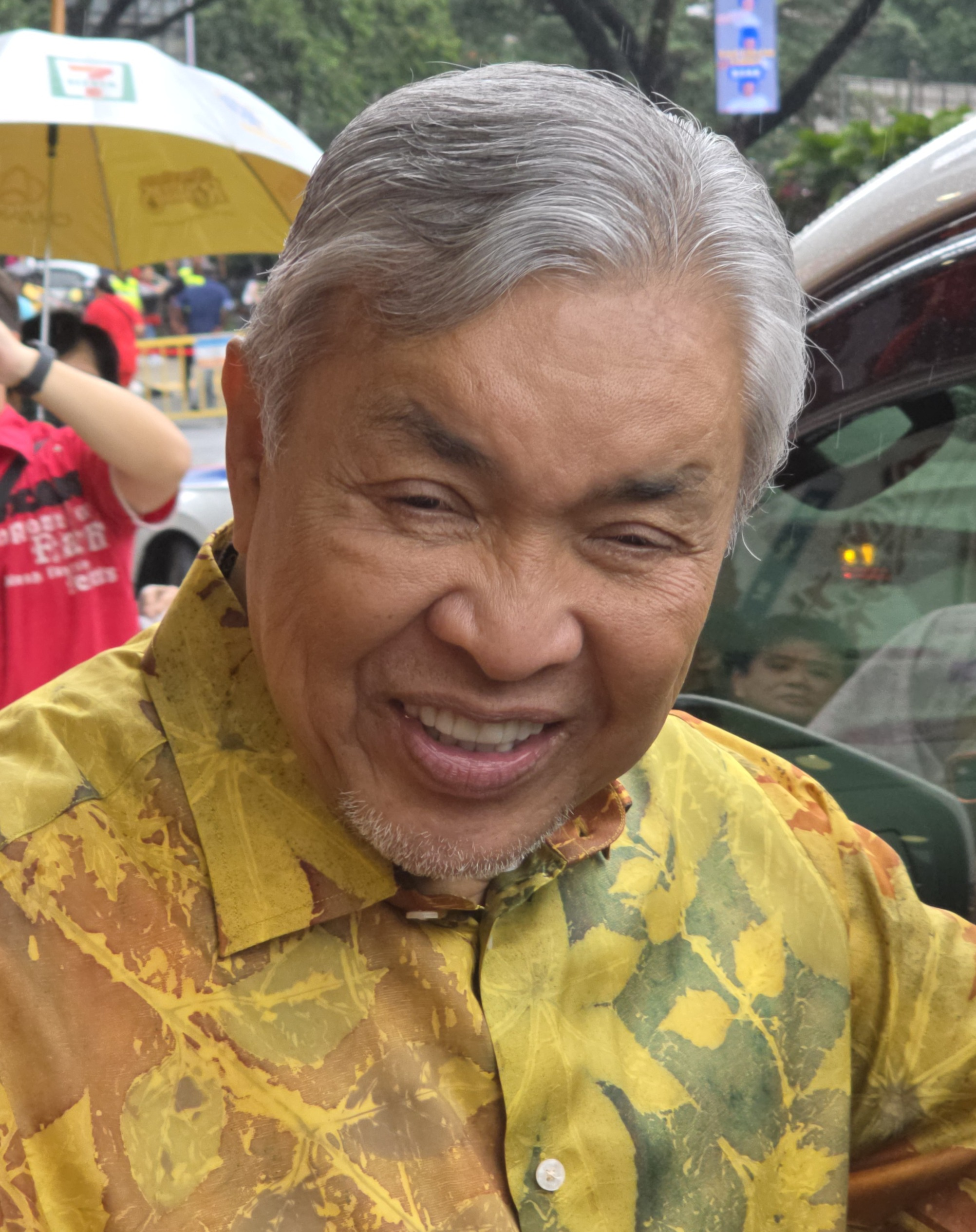
- Incumbent; Ahmad Zahid Hamidi since 30 June 2018
- Style: Yang Amat Berhormat Dato' Seri President
- Type: Political party office
- Status: Political party leader
- Member of: United Malays National Organisation (UMNO); United Malays National Organisation's National Supreme Council (Note: Malay: Majlis Kerja Tertinggi UMNO (MKT UMNO))
- Residence: Menara Dato Onn, Jalan Tun Ismail, Chow Kit, 50350 Kuala Lumpur, Wilayah Persekutuan Kuala Lumpur
- Nominator: United Malays National Organisation's National Supreme Council
- Appointer: United Malays National Organisation's National Supreme Council
- Term length: Four years, renewable; (No term limit)
- Formation: 11 May 1946; 80 years ago
- First holder: Onn Jaafar
- Unofficial names: Leader of the UMNO
- Deputy: Mohamad Hasan (2018–present)
- Website: umno.org.my/en/presiden/

The President of the United Malays National Organisation or President of UMNO (Malay: Presiden Pertubuhan Kebangsaan Melayu Bersatu or Presiden UMNO) is the highest position of the largest and oldest party in Malaysia. Since 30 June 2018, the office has been held by Ahmad Zahid Hamidi.

== Structure ==
The President of the United Malays National Organisation is supported by a deputy president, who has been Mohamad Hasan since 2018. Furthermore, the president is supported by three vice presidents, currently holding by Wan Rosdy Wan Ismail, Mohamed Khaled Nordin and Johari Abdul Ghani.

== Political significance ==
With the exceptions of Ahmad Zahid Hamidi and Onn Jaafar, every presidents of UMNO served as the Prime Minister of Malaysia from August 1957 to May 2018, while a vice president of UMNO, (Ismail Sabri Yaakob) also served as the Prime Minister from August 2021 to November 2022.

== List of presidents of UMNO ==
No.	Image	President	Term start	Term end	Election results
1.		Onn Jaafar	11 May 1946	25 August 1951	1946-49 unopposed 1950 Onn Jaafar - 66; Mahmud Mahyudin - 3
2.		Tunku Abdul Rahman	25 August 1951	23 January 1971	1951 Tunku Abdul Rahman - 57; Chik Mohamad Yusuf Sheikh Abdul Rahman - 11; Ahmad Fuad Hassan - 7 1952-69 unopposed
3		Abdul Razak Hussein	25 June 1972	14 January 1976	1972 unopposed 1975 unopposed
4		Hussein Onn	15 September 1978	28 June 1981	1978 Hussein Onn - 898; Sulaiman Palestin - 250
5		Mahathir Mohamad	28 June 1981	31 October 2003	1981 unopposed 1984 unopposed 1987 Mahathir Mohamad - 761; Tengku Razaleigh Hamzah - 718 1990 unopposed 1993 unopposed 1996 unopposed 2000 unopposed
6		Abdullah Ahmad Badawi	23 September 2004	26 March 2009	2004 unopposed
7		Najib Razak	26 March 2009	12 May 2018	2009 unopposed 2013 unopposed
8		Ahmad Zahid Hamidi	30 June 2018	Incumbent	2018 Ahmad Zahid Hamidi - 39,197; Khairy Jamaluddin - 32,592; Tengku Razaleigh Hamzah - 20,462 2023 unopposed

== See also ==
- Barisan Nasional
- Muafakat Nasional
- United Malays National Organisation leadership elections
- 1988 Malaysian constitutional crisis
- 2020–22 Malaysian political crisis
