= Asyraf Wajdi Dusuki =

Malaysian politician

Yang Berbahagia Datuk Wira Dr. Asyraf Wajdi Dusuki DCSM DIMP PhD
- أشرف وجدي دسوقي
- Asyraf Wajdi in 2026

Chairman of the Majlis Amanah Rakyat
- Incumbent
- Assumed office 10 March 2023
- Minister: Ahmad Zahid Hamidi
- Director-General: Azhar Abdul Manaf (2023–2025); Zulfikri Osman (since 2025)
- Preceded by: Azizah Mohd Dun

Deputy Minister in the Prime Minister's Department (Islamic Affairs)
- In office 29 July 2015 – 10 May 2018
- Monarchs: Abdul Halim (2015–2016); Muhammad V (2016–2018)
- Prime Minister: Najib Razak
- Minister: Jamil Khir Baharom
- Preceded by: Mashitah Ibrahim (2009–2013)
- Succeeded by: Fuziah Salleh
- Constituency: Senator

Senator Appointed by the Yang di-Pertuan Agong
- In office 26 May 2014 – 20 April 2018
- Monarchs: Abdul Halim (2014–2016); Muhammad V (2016–2018)
- Prime Minister: Najib Razak

Secretary-General of the United Malays National Organisation
- Incumbent
- Assumed office 22 March 2023
- President: Ahmad Zahid Hamidi
- Preceded by: Ahmad Maslan

14th Youth Chief of the United Malays National Organisation
- In office 24 June 2018 – 11 March 2023
- President: Ahmad Zahid Hamidi
- Vice Youth Chief: Shahril Sufian Hamdan
- Preceded by: Khairy Jamaluddin
- Succeeded by: Muhamad Akmal Saleh

Personal details
- Born: Asyraf Wajdi bin Dusuki; 14 May 1976 (age 50) Kuala Lumpur, Malaysia
- Party: United Malays National Organisation (UMNO)
- Other political affiliations: Barisan Nasional (BN)
- Spouse: Nurdianawati Irwani Abdullah
- Relations: Nik Nazmi (Second cousin)
- Parent(s): Dusuki Ahmad & Nik Noraini Nik Yahya
- Education: SMA Persekutuan Labu
- Alma mater: International Islamic University Malaysia (BAcc); Loughborough University (MSc, PhD)
- Profession: Lecturer
- Website: http://www.asyrafwajdi.com
- Asyraf Wajdi Dusuki on Facebook

Asyraf Wajdi bin Dusuki (Jawi: أشرف وجدي دسوقي, Malay pronunciation: [asyraf wajdi]; born 14 May 1976) is a Malaysian politician who has served as Chairman of the Majlis Amanah Rakyat (MARA) since March 2023. He served as Deputy Minister in the Prime Minister's Department in charge of Islamic Affairs in the Barisan Nasional (BN) administration under former Prime Minister Najib Razak and former Minister Jamil Khir Baharom from July 2015 to the collapse of the BN administration in May 2018 as well as a Senator from May 2014 to his resignation in April 2018. He is a member of the United Malays National Organisation (UMNO), a component party of the BN coalition. He has also served as the Secretary-General of UMNO since March 2023 and also served as the 14th Youth Chief of UMNO from June 2018 to March 2023.

== Early life and education ==
Born in Kuala Lumpur to Kelantanese parents, Asyraf is the third son of Dusuki Ahmad, who was once President of YADIM and former political secretary to Mahathir Mohamad and Nik Nooraini Nik Yahya (born 1947). He is married to Nurdianawati Irwani Abdullah, where they both met at International Islamic University Malaysia (IIUM) together, who is also an Islamic finance expert. Prior to entering IIUM, Asyraf was a student of Sekolah Menengah Agama Persekutuan Labu. In 2000, he graduated from IIUM with a bachelor's degree in accounting, and then furthered his studies at Loughborough University, where he obtain two postgraduate degrees with a Master of Science with Distinction (Islamic Economics, Banking and Finance), and Doctor of Philosophy (Islamic Banking and Finance).

== Early career ==
=== Islamic banking and finance ===
Prior to taking political office, he served IIUM as a lecturer and then, an assistant professor of its Kulliyyah of Economics and Management Sciences. He also served the International Shariʽah Research Academy for Islamic Finance as Head of Research Affairs, and International Centre for Education in Islamic Finance as an associate professor.

=== Executive appointments ===
Before being appointed as a Senator and Deputy Minister, Asyraf was appointed as the President of Islamic Da'wah Foundation of Malaysia (YADIM) on 3 June 2013 by Prime Minister Najib Razak. On 26 May 2014, the Yang di-Pertuan Agong admitted him to the Parliament as a Senator, which eventually paved the way for Najib to promote him as a Deputy Federal Minister in charge of Islamic affairs in July 2015. As such, he takes charge of YADIM, Islamic Economic Development Foundation of Malaysia (YaPEIM), Tabung Haji, TV Alhijrah, Institute of Islamic Understanding Malaysia (IKIM) and Department of Waqf, Zakat and Hajj (JAWHAR).

== Political career ==
=== Legislative and parliamentary candidacy ===
Asyraf has contested in three different Malaysian general elections at three different constituencies. Firstly in 2008 at his hometown of Tumpat, second at the coastal seat of Pasir Puteh in 2018, and most recently in 2022 at Gerik. Asyraf has lost all of the elections that he contested in.

=== UMNO and BN ===
Asyraf was elected as the Youth Chief of UMNO right after the party's defeat in the 14th Malaysian General Election where he defeated other notable party contenders such as former Senator and Vice Youth Chief Khairul Azwan Harun, and Paya Besar Member of Parliament Mohd Shahar Abdullah. Prior to GE14, he held the position of UMNO Supreme Council Member and Chairman of the Kelantan State UMNO Liaison Body Religious Bureau. Asyraf has also served as a Committee Member of the UMNO Malaysian NGO-GCOC Liaison Bureau and also the Advisory Panel of the An-Nur Squad of the UMNO Women's Movement. Asyraf is currently the Secretary-General of UMNO where he was directly appointed by the current President of UMNO, Ahmad Zahid Hamidi. Asyraf is known notably in UMNO as a Zahid loyalist as he has been given several government-linked and senior party level appointments despite consistently losing elections.

== Political views ==
=== Views on atheism ===
When a picture from a gathering of the Atheist Republic Consulate of Kuala Lumpur was posted on Atheist Republic's Facebook page in August 2017, Asyraf ordered an inquiry into whether anyone in the picture had apostatised from Islam or had 'spread atheism' to any Muslims present, both of which are illegal in Malaysia.

He has openly expressed his extreme views against atheism. Asyraf stated that atheism was 'unconstitutional' and even suggested it is an offence under the Sedition Act. However, he reported that Facebook had rejected a joint government and Malaysian Communications and Multimedia Commission demand to shut down Atheist Republic's page and similar atheist pages because they did not violate any of the company's community standards.

== Election results ==
Parliament of Malaysia
Year	Constituency	Candidate	Votes	Pct	Opponent(s)	Votes	Pct	Ballots cast	Majority	Turnout
2008	P019 Tumpat	Asyraf Wajdi Dusuki (UMNO)	27,337	41.89%	Kamarudin Jaffar (PAS)	36,714	56.26%	65,254	9,377	81.49%
2018	P028 Pasir Puteh	Asyraf Wajdi Dusuki (UMNO)	30,947	45.41%	Nik Muhammad Zawawi Salleh (PAS)	32,307	47.41%	68,150	1,360	81.66%
2018	P028 Pasir Puteh	Asyraf Wajdi Dusuki (UMNO)	30,947	45.41%	Kamarudin Md Nor (BERSATU)	4,896	7.18%	68,150	1,360	81.66%
2022	P054 Gerik	Asyraf Wajdi Dusuki (UMNO)	13,728	39.66%	Fathul Huzir Ayob (BERSATU)	15,105	43.64%	34,612	1,377	72.77%
2022	P054 Gerik	Asyraf Wajdi Dusuki (UMNO)	13,728	39.66%	Ahmad Tarmizi Mohd Jam (DAP)	5,779	16.70%	34,612	1,377	72.77%

== Honours ==
=== Honours of Malaysia ===
- Malacca
  - Knight Commander of the Exalted Order of Malacca (DCSM) – Datuk Wira (2023)
- Pahang
  - Knight Companion of the Order of the Crown of Pahang (DIMP) – Dato' (2014)

== See also ==
- Members of the Dewan Negara, 13th Malaysian Parliament
- List of International Islamic University Malaysia alumni
