= 2023 UMNO leadership election =

Election in a political party in Malaysia

2023 United Malays National Organisation leadership election
- 18 March 2023
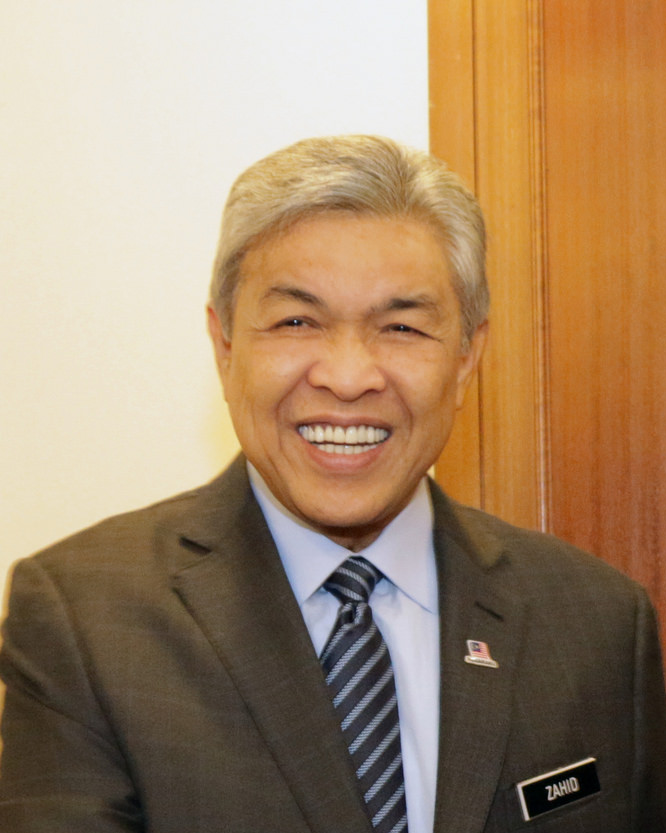
Nominee	Ahmad Zahid Hamidi
Electoral vote	won uncontested
President of UMNO before election
Ahmad Zahid Hamidi
President of UMNO
Ahmad Zahid Hamidi

A leadership election was held by the United Malays National Organisation (UMNO) party on 18 March 2023.

== Background ==
In the aftermath of the 2022 Malaysian general election, Khairy Jamaluddin, Noh Omar, Shahril Sufian Hamdan and several UMNO leaders called for party leader Ahmad Zahid Hamidi to resign.

== Controversies ==
On 14 January 2023, the UMNO general assembly has given consent to a motion for the posts of president and deputy president not to be contested at the coming party polls. Therefore, President of UMNO, Ahmad Zahid Hamidi and Deputy President of UMNO, Mohamad Hasan will remain at their position respectively for another term until 2026.

On 28 January 2023, Khairy Jamaluddin and Noh Omar was sacked from the party while Hishammuddin Hussein, Shahril Sufian Hamdan, Maulizan Bujang and Salim Sharif was suspended their membership for six years by the UMNO supreme council.

== Supreme Council election results ==
=== Permanent Chairman ===
No.	Candidate	Division won	Delegates' votes
01	Badruddin Amiruldin	178	79,466
02	Shamsul Najmi Shamsuddin	9	

=== Deputy Permanent Chairman ===
No.	Candidate	Division won	Delegates' votes
02	Abdul Fattah Abdullah	127	48,017
01	Rohani Mohd Sharif		
03	Tusiman Kadir		
04	Azizan Abdullah		
05	Nazri Ismail		
06	Hasnoor Sidang Hussein		
07	Mohd Hafeez Che Mat		
08	Sharifah Azizah Syed Zain		
09	Adzly Ab Manas		
10	Othman Desa		

=== President ===
Candidate	Division won	Delegates' votes
Ahmad Zahid Hamidi	won uncontested	

=== Deputy President ===
Candidate	Division won	Delegates' votes
Mohamad Hasan	won uncontested	

=== Vice Presidents ===
No.	Candidate	Division won	Delegates' votes
05	Wan Rosdy Wan Ismail	127	52,202
07	Mohamed Khaled Nordin	116	46,141
03	Johari Abdul Ghani	110	47,624
01	Azalina Othman Said	73	
06	Reezal Merican Naina Merican	48	
08	Hasni Mohammad	42	
02	Mahdzir Khalid	40	
04	Mohd Yusof Musa @ Jamaluddin	0	

=== Supreme Council Members ===
No.	Candidate	Division won	Delegates' votes
38	Shamsul Anuar Nasarah	178	69,494
24	Zambry Abdul Kadir	175	67,940
06	Ahmad Maslan	167	67,372
91	Tengku Zafrul Aziz	167	62,839
31	Bung Moktar Radin	160	61,042
26	Ahmad Jazlan Yaakub	152	57,625
37	Abdul Azeez Abdul Rahim	151	55,365
50	Shahaniza Shamsuddin	129	47,136
35	Azian Osman	124	44,806
01	Md Alwi Che Ahmad	118	47,652
23	Shaik Hussein Mydin	118	42,275
33	Zahida Zarik Khan	113	44,254
73	Mohd Razlan Muhammad Rafii	113	42,517
80	Mohd Sharkar Shamsudin	111	41,095
83	Abdul Rahman Mohamad	110	40,081
16	Mohd Puad Zarkashi	108	43,004
40	Jamil Khir Baharom	106	41,900
11	Johan Abd Aziz	102	39,767
36	Hizatul Isham Abdul Jalil	101	42,340
65	Abdul Rahman Dahlan	99	39,243
14	Lokman Noor Adam	97	40,336
81	Ahmad Said	96	39,087
85	Rosnah Abdul Rashid Shirlin	94	39,782
79	Mohd Rafi Ali Hassan	93	34,653
92	Abdul Razak Abdul Rahman	91	35,901
67	Mohamad Alamin	91	
08	Jalaluddin Alias	90	
95	Suraya Yaacob	89	
07	Mohamad Fatmi Che Salleh	84	
04	Fathul Bari Mat Jahya	74	
44	Mohd Shafei Abdullah	65	
64	Mohd Hasnol Ayub	62	
12	Hasmuni Hassan	59	
78	Zakaria Dullah	58	
70	Mohamad Ali Mohamad	53	
13	Rozabil Abdul Rahman	52	
86	Rosni Sohar	47	
28	Khairul Azwan Harun	41	
77	Nur Jazlan Mohamed	39	
02	Mohd Lassim Burhan	35	
47	Khir Toyo	35	
61	Shaiful Hazizy Zainol Abidin	30	
56	Mohd Arifin Nan @ Adenan	28	
49	Mastura Mohd Yazid	26	
15	Adnan Seman	26	
18	Mohd Arrif Abdul Majid	25	
76	Sohaimi Shahadan	24	
66	Najmil Faiz Mohamed Aris	24	
29	Othman Aziz	23	
46	Azlan Man	22	
75	Jamal Md Yunos	21	
22	Mat Nadzari Ahmad Dahlan	21	
88	Rais Yasin	21	
72	Hamim Samuri	21	
20	Mohd Zaidy Abdul Kadir	20	
51	Zainal Abidin Mohd Rafique	20	
74	Azhar Ahmad	20	
21	Mohd Johari Baharum	18	
45	Bastien Onn	18	
58	Abdul Shukur Idris	17	
32	Izudin Ishak	16	
93	Mohd Fuad Tukirin	16	
10	Zainal Abidin Jidin	15	
55	Muhammad Faiz Hashim	14	
27	Julie Sabran	13	
84	Mohamad Fazly Zainudin	12	
94	Mohamad Rafi Awg Kechik	11	
87	Jailani Johari	10	
89	Johari Yazid	10	
42	Jefridin Atan	10	
62	Ghazalie Ansing	10	
41	Mohd Zaid Ibrahim	9	
60	Mohd Najib Mohd Isa	8	
69	Muhamad Muqharabbin Mokhtarrudin	7	
48	Mohamad Zahir Abdul Khalid	7	
82	Hasni Yang Ghazali	5	
03	Lilah Yasin	3	
25	Samsuri Shahrom	3	
59	Mohd Hazmi Yusof	3	
53	Musa Mabul	3	
17	Zein Isma Ismail	2	
30	Rosli Othman	2	
57	Mohamed Hazali Abu Hassan	2	
52	Mohd Fazillah Mohd Ali	2	
05	Syamsul Hidayat Mohd Shariff	1	
09	Kamaruzaman Ali	1	
63	Mohd Zainul Fithri Othman	1	
19	Muhamad Faizullah Alkamal	1	
43	Rosli Mohd Salleh	1	
68	Muzafar Ali Khan Mohd Sidek	1	
90	Misri Barham	1	
39	Abdul Halim Hafez Abdul Rahman	1	
71	Abdul Ghani Ngah	1	
34	Ahmad Fazuan Kamaruddin	1	
54	Khairul Azmi Mohamad	0	

== See also ==
- President of the United Malays National Organisation
- 2020–2022 Malaysian political crisis
- 2022 Malaysian general election
- Anwar Ibrahim cabinet
- 2018 UMNO leadership election
- UMNO leadership elections
