= Arman Azha Abu Hanifah =

Malaysian politician (born 1975)

Yang Berbahagia Dato' Arman Azha Abu Hanifah DIMP
- عرمان أزها أبو حنيفة

Senator Appointed by the Yang di-Pertuan Agong
- In office 26 October 2021 – 25 October 2024
- Monarchs: Abdullah (2021–2024); Ibrahim (2024)
- Prime Minister: Ismail Sabri Yaakob (2021–2022); Anwar Ibrahim (2022–2024)

Personal details
- Born: Arman Azha bin Abu Hanifah; 12 December 1975 (age 50) Ipoh, Perak
- Party: United Malays National Organisation (UMNO) (1995–present)
- Other political affiliations: Barisan Nasional (BN) (1995–present)
- Spouse: Azlina Abdullah
- Children: 2
- Occupation: Politician
- Profession: Businessman

Dato' Arman Azha bin Abu Hanifah (born 12 December 1975), also known as Armand Azha, is a Malaysian politician and businessman. He is a member of the United Malays National Organisation (UMNO), a component party of the BN coalition. He served as a Senator from October 2021 to October 2024. He is a former Member of the UMNO Supreme Council and currently the Division Chief of UMNO Subang.

== Early life and education ==
He obtained a Master of Political Science from the University College of Geomatics, Kuala Lumpur in 2017. He is active in sports, especially cycling, running and swimming. He used to cycle from Kuala Lumpur to Langkawi for more than 500 km in 2020 in conjunction with the Rapha 500 Festival.

== Business ==
He is a businessman involved in the cyber security technology industry and is a director of Asia Coding Centre Sdn Bhd.

== Politics ==
He has held several positions in UMNO, including as EXCO of UMNO Youth from 2013 to 2018 under the leadership of Khairy Jamaluddin. He is also the first head of the youth wing (Chief Hero) of the Perkasa Malaysia Indigenous Organization, where he served from 2009 to 2010.

== Health ==
Arman was once confirmed positive for COVID-19 on January 4, 2021.

== Honour ==
- Pahang
  - Knight Companion of the Order of the Crown of Pahang (DIMP) – Dato' (2015)
