= 2000 UMNO leadership election =

2000 United Malays National Organisation leadership election
- 11 May 2000
Candidate	Mahathir Mohamad
Popular vote	won uncontested
President of UMNO before election
Mahathir Mohamad
President of UMNO
Mahathir Mohamad

A leadership election was held by the United Malays National Organisation (UMNO) party on 11 May 2000. It was won by incumbent Prime Minister and President of UMNO, Mahathir Mohamad.

== Supreme Council election results ==
=== Permanent Chairman ===
Candidate	Delegates' votes	Division nominated
Sulaiman Ninam Shah	won uncontested	

=== Deputy Permanent Chairman ===
Candidate	Delegates' votes	Division nominated
Onn Ismail	867 votes	

=== President ===
Candidate	Delegates' votes	Division nominated
Mahathir Mohamad	won uncontested	164
Tengku Razaleigh Hamzah	did not qualify	1

=== Deputy President ===
Candidate	Delegates' votes	Division nominated
Abdullah Ahmad Badawi	won uncontested	

=== Vice Presidents ===
Candidate	Delegates' votes (max. 3)	Division nominated
Mohammad Najib Abdul Razak	1,289 votes	151
Muhammad Muhammad Taib	853 votes	32
Muhyiddin Yassin	813 votes	30
Osu Sukam	629 votes	
Abu Hassan Omar	616 votes	58
Syed Hamid Albar	524 votes	
Abdul Ghani Othman	469 votes	80
Mohd Isa Abdul Samad	421 votes	
Rais Yatim	371 votes	

=== Supreme Council Members ===
Candidate	Delegates' votes (max. 25)	Division nominated
Mohd Ali Mohd Rustam	1,647 votes	
Mustapa Mohamed	1,628 votes	
Tajol Rosli Mohd Ghazali	1,439 votes	
Ahmad Zahid Hamidi	1,370 votes	
Mohamed Nazri Abdul Aziz	1,354 votes	
Abdul Hamid Othman	1,341 votes	
Mohd Shafie Apdal	1,338 votes	
Jamaluddin Mohd. Jarjis	1,268 votes	
Abdul Aziz Shamsuddin	1,263 votes	
Annuar Musa	1,232 votes	
Baseri @ Azmi Khalid	1,192 votes	
Abdul Azim Mohd. Zabidi	1,122 votes	
Mohamed Yusof Mohamed Noor	1,076 votes	
Shahrir Abdul Samad	1,036 votes	
Abdul Kadir Sheikh Fadzir	1,021 votes	
Adnan Yaakob	1,019 votes	
Suleiman Mohamed	1,008 votes	
Mohd. Shafie Mohd. Salleh	1,003 votes	
Salleh Said Keruak	993 votes	
Mohd. Khalid Mohd. Yunus	966 votes	
Hassan Harun	960 votes	
Lajim Ukin	932 votes	
Ramli Ngah Talib	898 votes	
Hasan Arifin	889 votes	
Hilmi Yahaya	864 votes	
Affifudin Omar	818 votes	
Zainal Abidin Zin	725 votes	
Mahadzir Mohd Khir	653 votes	
Abdul Hamid Pawanteh	votes	
Fauzi Abdul Rahman	votes	
Ibrahim Ali	votes	
Kasitah Gaddam	votes	
Maznah Abdul Hamid	votes	
Megat Junid Megat Ayub	votes	
Mohd Shariff Omar	votes	
Norraesah Mohamad	votes	
Osman Aroff	votes	
Raja Ropiaah Raja Abdullah	votes	
Shahidan Kassim	votes	
Shahrizat Abdul Jalil	votes	
Zainal Dahlan	votes	
Zaleha Ismail	votes	

== See also ==
- 2004 Malaysian general election
- Sixth Mahathir cabinet
