= 2018 UMNO leadership election =

2018 United Malays National Organisation leadership election
- 30 June 2018
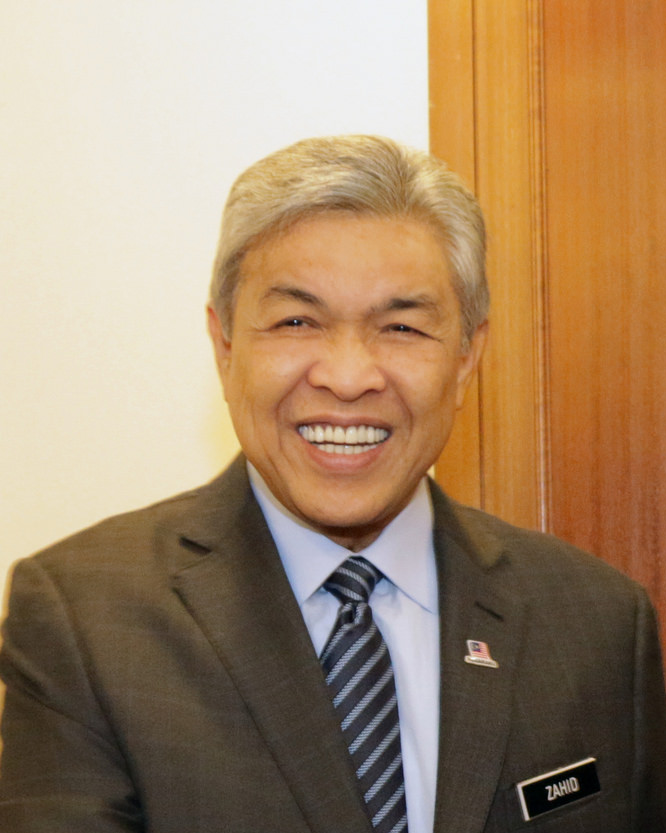

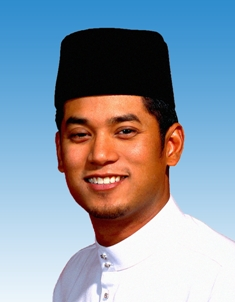
Nominee	Ahmad Zahid Hamidi	Khairy Jamaluddin	Tengku Razaleigh Hamzah
Electoral vote	99	61	30
Popular vote	39,197	32,592	20,462
Percentage	42.4%	35.3%	22.1%
President of UMNO before election
Ahmad Zahid Hamidi
(acting)
President of UMNO
Ahmad Zahid Hamidi

A leadership election was held by the United Malays National Organisation (UMNO) party on 30 June 2018.

== Background ==
The election was initially scheduled to be held in 2019. However, Barisan Nasional lost the 2018 Malaysian general election, a first since independence in 1957. Then-president Najib Razak stood down and was replaced by acting President Ahmad Zahid Hamidi.

The nomination process started on 1 June 2018. The registration closed on 17 June 2018 at 5 pm.

== Debate ==
The Presidential election was held on 29 June 2018. It was telecast on Astro Awani at 9.30 pm. It featured the three prominent candidates, which are Ahmad Zahid Hamidi, Tengku Razaleigh Hamzah and Khairy Jamaluddin.

== Supreme Council election results ==
The result will mostly out on 1.00 am on 1 July 2018.

=== Permanent Chairman ===
Candidate	Division won	Delegates' votes
Badruddin Amiruldin		

=== Deputy Permanent Chairman ===
Candidate	Division won	Delegates' votes
Rizuan Abdul Hamid		

=== President ===
No.	Candidate	Division won	Delegates' votes
03	Ahmad Zahid Hamidi	99	39,197
02	Khairy Jamaluddin	61	32,592
01	Tengku Razaleigh Hamzah	30	20,462

=== Deputy President ===
No.	Candidate	Division won	Delegates' votes
01	Mohamad Hasan	131	56,907
02	Annuar Musa	59	29,843

=== Vice Presidents ===
No.	Candidate	Division won	Delegates' votes (max. 3)
01	Ismail Sabri Yaakob	183	74,680
05	Mahdzir Khalid	125	52,698
02	Mohamad Khaled Nordin	91	42,549
07	Johari Abdul Ghani	88	38,985
06	Tajuddin Abdul Rahman	74	33,238
03	Ahmad Said	9	5,468

=== Supreme Council Members ===
Candidate	Division won	Delegates' votes (max. 25)
Mustapa Mohamed		
Zambry Abdul Kadir		
Shamsul Anuar Nasarah		
Reezal Merican Naina Merican		
Mohd Sharkar Shamsudin		
Abdul Rahman Dahlan		
Razali Ibrahim		
Azalina Othman Said		
Lokman Noor Adam		
Bung Moktar Radin		
Md Alwi Che Ahmad		
Rosnah Shirlin		
Abdul Azeez Abdul Rahim		
Noh Omar		
Ahmad Shabery Cheek		
Jamil Khir Baharom		
Fathul Bari Mat Jahaya		
Azian Osman		
Khaidiriah Abu Zahar		
Ahmad Maslan		
Ahmad Jazlan Yaakub		
Jalaluddin Alias		
Hasni Mohammad		
Zahidi Zainul Abidin		
Suraya Yaacob		
Mustafa Musa		
Abdul Manan Indanan		
Tun Faisal Ismail Aziz		
Ibdilillah Ishak		
Muhamad Rosli Che Wan		
Shaik Hussein Mydin		
Zein Isma Ismail		
Wan Abdul Hakim Wan Mokhtar		
Yahaya Mat Ghani		
Zainal Abidin Mohd Rafique		
Idris Haron		
Abd Zarin Mohd Yasin		
Mohd. Khusairi Abdul Talib		
Ismail Abdul Muttalib		
Mansor Abd Rahman		
Abdul Hakim Gulam Hassan		
Mat Nadzari Ahmad Dahlan		
Abdul Halim Hafez Abdul Rahman		
Rosol Wahid		
Tengku Putera Haron Aminurras		
Johari Baharum		
Yusoff M Haniff		
Wan Azizi Wan Mohamed		
Abdul Rahman Haji Sulaiman		
Nawawi Ahmad		
Mohd Haniff Koslan		
Juli Hussin		
Fahariyah Md Nordin		
Hamim Samuri		
Lilah Yasin		
Abu Bakar Mohamad Diah		
Mohamad Satim Diman		
Ismail Mohamed Said		
Azlan Man		
Puad Zarkashi		
Shahanim Mohd Yusoff		
Abdul Rahman Mohamad		
Mohd Fasiah Mohd Fakeh		
Razlan Rafii		
Mohd Salim Sharif		
Arman Azha Abu Hanifah		
Shahidan Kassim		
Othman Aziz		

== See also ==
- 2018 Malaysian general election
- Second Najib cabinet
- 2023 United Malays National Organisation leadership election
