= 2004 UMNO leadership election =

2004 United Malays National Organisation leadership election
- 23 September 2004
Candidate	Abdullah Ahmad Badawi
Popular vote	won uncontested
Acting President of UMNO before election
Abdullah Ahmad Badawi
President of UMNO
Abdullah Ahmad Badawi

A leadership election was held by the United Malays National Organisation (UMNO) party on 23 September 2004. It was won by incumbent Prime Minister and acting President of UMNO, Abdullah Ahmad Badawi.

== Supreme Council election results ==
Ref:

=== Permanent Chairman ===
Candidate	Delegates' votes	Division nominated
Onn Ismail	1,118 votes	
Mohamad Aziz	votes	
Mohd. Khalid Mohd. Yunus	votes	

=== Deputy Permanent Chairman ===
Candidate	Delegates' votes	Division nominated
Badruddin Amiruldin	1,501 votes	
Muhammad Abdullah	votes	
Rizuan Abdul Hamid	votes	

=== President ===
Candidate	Delegates' votes	Division nominated
Abdullah Ahmad Badawi	won uncontested	190
Tengku Razaleigh Hamzah	did not qualify	1

=== Deputy President ===
Candidate	Delegates' votes	Division nominated
Mohammad Najib Abdul Razak	won uncontested	

=== Vice Presidents ===
Candidate	Delegates' votes (max. 3)	Division nominated
Mohd Isa Abdul Samad	1,507 votes	
Mohd Ali Mohd Rustam	1,329 votes	
Muhyiddin Yassin	1,234 votes	
Muhammad Muhammad Taib	1,177 votes	
Mustapa Mohamed	1,059 votes	
Adnan Yaakob	690 votes	
Shahrir Abdul Samad	651 votes	

=== Supreme Council Members ===
Candidate	Delegates' votes (max. 25)	Division nominated
Mohamad Khir Toyo	2,015 votes	170
Ahmad Zahid Hamidi	1,981 votes	
Musa Aman	1,837 votes	
Mohd Zin Mohamed	1,765 votes	104
Jamaluddin Mohd. Jarjis	1,740 votes	115
Shahrizat Abdul Jalil	1,705 votes	
Mohd Shafie Apdal	1,672 votes	
Noh Omar	1,672 votes	
Annuar Musa	1,668 votes	
Tengku Putera Tengku Awang	1,660 votes	101
Syed Hamid Albar	1,649 votes	
Mohamed Khaled Nordin	1,590 votes	
Shahidan Kassim	1,570 votes	
Abdul Rahim Thamby Chik	1,545 votes	
Mohamad Hasan	1,518 votes	
Syed Razak Syed Zain Barakbah	1,471 votes	157
Abdul Ghani Othman	1,466 votes	140
Awang Adek Hussin	1,444 votes	121
Azalina Othman Said	1,433 votes	
Norraesah Mohamad	1,402 votes	
Abdul Aziz Shamsuddin	1,374 votes	170
Tengku Adnan Tengku Mansor	1,359 votes	84
Abdul Rahman Bakar	1,358 votes	
Abdul Latiff Ahmad	1,312 votes	
Hilmi Yahaya	1,239 votes	
Zainal Abidin Zin	votes	64
Salleh Said Keruak	votes	
Zahidi Zainul Abidin	votes	15
Tajuddin Abdul Rahman	votes	
Abdul Rashid Abdullah	votes	
Lajim Ukin	votes	
Astaman Abdul Aziz	votes	
Affifudin Omar	votes	
Baseri @ Azmi Khalid	votes	90
Hamzah Zainudin	votes	
Shaziman Abu Mansor	votes	
Suhaili Abdul Rahman	votes	
Abdul Kadir Sheikh Fadzir	votes	154
Mohd. Shafie Mohd. Salleh	votes	
Ahmad Husni Hanadzlah	votes	66
Mohamed Yusof Mohamed Noor	votes	
Abdul Ghapur Salleh	votes	
Osu Sukam	votes	
Mohd Johari Baharum	votes	31
Tengku Azlan Sultan Abu Bakar	votes	
Mahadzir Mohd Khir	votes	
Hassan Harun	votes	
Mohd Shariff Omar	votes	
Abdul Hamid Othman	votes	31
Ishak Ismail	votes	
Anifah Aman	votes	
Rais Yatim	withdrawn	
Abdullah Md Zin	withdrawn	1

== See also ==
- 2008 Malaysian general election
- Second Abdullah cabinet
