= 2009 UMNO leadership election =

2009 United Malays National Organisation leadership election
- 26 March 2009
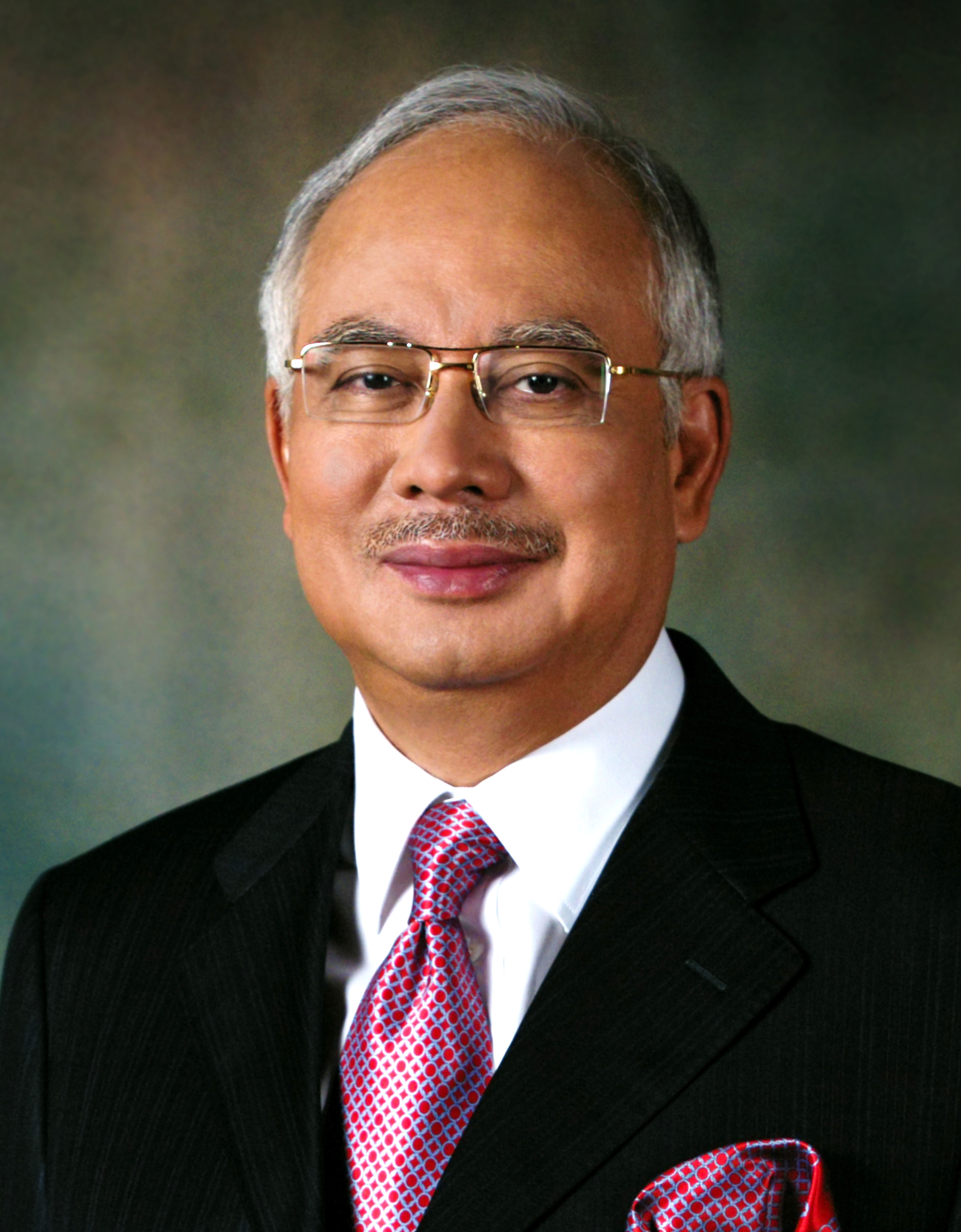
| Candidate | Najib Razak |
| Popular vote | won uncontested |
President of UMNO before election
Abdullah Ahmad Badawi
President of UMNO
Najib Razak

2009 United Malays National Organisation leadership election
- 26 March 2009
| Candidate | Muhyiddin Yassin | Muhammad Muhammad Taib |
| Popular vote | 1,575 | 916 |
Deputy President of UMNO before election
Najib Razak
Deputy President of UMNO
Muhyiddin Yassin

A leadership election was held by the United Malays National Organisation (UMNO) party on 26 March 2009. It was won by then Deputy Prime Minister and then Deputy President of UMNO, Najib Razak.

== Supreme Council election results ==
=== Permanent Chairman ===
| Candidate | Delegates' votes | Division nominated |
|---|---|---|
| Badruddin Amiruldin | 2,272 votes | |
| Onn Ismail | votes | |

=== Deputy Permanent Chairman ===
| Candidate | Delegates' votes | Division nominated |
|---|---|---|
| Mohamad Aziz | won uncontested | |
| Ahmad Bhari Abdul Rahman | withdrawn | |

=== President ===
| Candidate | Delegates' votes | Division nominated |
|---|---|---|
| Mohammad Najib Abdul Razak | won uncontested | 182 |
| Tengku Razaleigh Hamzah | did not qualify | 1 |

=== Deputy President ===
| Candidate | Delegates' votes | Division nominated |
|---|---|---|
| Muhyiddin Yassin | 1,575 votes | 91 |
| Muhammad Muhammad Taib | 916 votes | 46 |
| Mohd Ali Mohd Rustam | disqualified | 47 |
| Shahrir Abdul Samad | did not qualify | 1 |
| Nur Jazlan Mohamed | withdrawn | |

=== Vice Presidents ===
| Candidate | Delegates' votes (max. 3) | Division nominated |
|---|---|---|
| Ahmad Zahid Hamidi | 1,592 votes | 105 |
| Hishammuddin Hussein | 1,515 votes | 152 |
| Mohd Shafie Apdal | 1,445 votes | 79 |
| Mohamed Khaled Nordin | 1,397 votes | 72 |
| Rais Yatim | 491 votes | 26 |
| Mohd Isa Abdul Samad | 432 votes | 26 |
| Syed Hamid Albar | 410 votes | 32 |
| Abdul Rahim Thamby Chik | 192 votes | 13 |
| Jamaluddin Mohd. Jarjis | withdrawn | 25 |
| Shahidan Kassim | did not qualify | 6 |
| Mohamad Hasan | did not qualify | 3 |
| Musa Aman | did not qualify | 2 |
| Annuar Musa | did not qualify | 2 |
| Mohd Ali Mohd Rustam | did not qualify | 1 |
| Halimah Mohamed Sadique | did not qualify | 1 |
| Affifudin Omar | did not qualify | 1 |

=== Supreme Council Members ===
| Candidate | Delegates' votes (max. 25) | Division nominated |
|---|---|---|
| Mustapa Mohamed | 2,259 votes | |
| Noh Omar | 2,084 votes | |
| Musa Aman | 2,084 votes | |
| Azian Osman | 2,060 votes | |
| Zainal Abidin Osman | 2,054 votes | |
| Mohd Zin Mohamed | 1,854 votes | |
| Ismail Sabri Yaakob | 1,838 votes | |
| Lajim Ukin | 1,804 votes | |
| Shaziman Abu Mansor | 1,705 votes | |
| Mohd Puad Zarkashi | 1,700 votes | |
| Tajuddin Abdul Rahman | 1,685 votes | |
| Idris Haron | 1,658 votes | |
| Abdul Latiff Ahmad | 1,624 votes | |
| Jamaluddin Mohd. Jarjis | 1,622 votes | |
| Saifuddin Abdullah | 1,619 votes | |
| Norraesah Mohamad | 1,611 votes | |
| Mahdzir Khalid | 1,580 votes | |
| Ahmad Husni Hanadzlah | 1,529 votes | |
| Hamzah Zainudin | 1,518 votes | |
| Moktar Radin | 1,517 votes | |
| Awang Adek Hussin | 1,481 votes | |
| Zulhasnan Rafique | 1,431 votes | |
| Ahmad Shabery Cheek | 1,377 votes | |
| Idris Jusoh | 1,275 votes | |
| Abdul Azeez Abdul Rahim | 1,265 votes | |
| Abdul Ghani Othman | votes | |
| Abdul Rahman Bakar | votes | |
| Abdullah Md Zin | votes | |
| Adnan Yaakob | votes | |
| Astaman Abdul Aziz | votes | |
| Azalina Othman Said | votes | |
| Azimi Daim | votes | |
| Azhar Ibrahim | votes | |
| Halimah Mohamed Sadique | votes | |
| Hasan Malek | votes | |
| Hilmi Yahaya | votes | |
| Ishak Ismail | votes | |
| Mohamed Zain Shamsuddin | votes | |
| Md Isa Sabu | votes | |
| Mohamad Hasan | votes | |
| Mohd Johari Baharum | votes | |
| Noraini Ahmad | votes | |
| Raja Ahmad Zainuddin Raja Omar | votes | |
| Raja Ropiaah Raja Abdullah | votes | |
| Sazmi Miah | votes | |
| Shahidan Kassim | votes | |
| Shahrir Abdul Samad | votes | |
| Siti Zaharah Sulaiman | votes | |
| Syed Ali Abbas Alhabshee | votes | |
| Zahidi Zainul Abidin | votes | |
| Mohamad Norza Zakaria | disqualified | |
| Mohd Radzi Manan | withdrawn | |

== See also ==
- 2013 Malaysian general election
- First Najib cabinet
