= 1993 UMNO leadership election =

1993 United Malays National Organisation leadership election
- 4 November 1993
Candidate	Mahathir Mohamad
Popular vote	won uncontested
President of UMNO before election
Mahathir Mohamad
President of UMNO
Mahathir Mohamad

A leadership election was held by the United Malays National Organisation (UMNO) party on 4 November 1993. It was won by incumbent Prime Minister and President of UMNO, Mahathir Mohamad.

== Supreme Council election results ==
Ref:

=== Permanent Chairman ===
Candidate	Delegates' votes	Division nominated
Sulaiman Ninam Shah	won uncontested	

=== Deputy Permanent Chairman ===
Candidate	Delegates' votes	Division nominated
Shoib Ahmad	won uncontested	

=== President ===
Candidate	Delegates' votes	Division nominated
Mahathir Mohamad	won uncontested	152

=== Deputy President ===
Candidate	Delegates' votes	Division nominated
Anwar Ibrahim	won uncontested	145
Ghafar Baba	withdrawn	7

=== Vice Presidents ===
Candidate	Delegates' votes (max. 3)	Division nominated
Muhyiddin Yassin	1,413 votes	133
Mohammad Najib Abdul Razak	1,202 votes	148
Muhammad Muhammad Taib	1,189 votes	138
Abdullah Ahmad Badawi	927 votes	16
Sanusi Junid	525 votes	13
Wan Mokhtar Ahmad	withdrawn	6
Mohamed Yusof Mohamed Noor	withdrawn	1
Anwar Ibrahim	withdrawn	1

=== Supreme Council Members ===
Candidate	Delegates' votes (max. 25)	Division nominated
	votes	
	votes	
	votes	
	votes	
	votes	
	votes	
Mustapa Mohamed	1,280 votes	
	votes	
	votes	
	votes	
	votes	
	votes	
	votes	
	votes	
	votes	
	votes	
	votes	
	votes	
	votes	
	votes	
Tengku Adnan Tengku Mansor	928 votes	
	votes	
	votes	
	votes	
	votes	

== See also ==
- 1995 Malaysian general election
- Fourth Mahathir cabinet
