= 1996 UMNO leadership election =

1996 United Malays National Organisation leadership election
- 10 October 1996
Candidate	Mahathir Mohamad
Popular vote	won uncontested
President of UMNO before election
Mahathir Mohamad
President of UMNO
Mahathir Mohamad

A leadership election was held by the United Malays National Organisation (UMNO) party on 10 October 1996. It was won by incumbent Prime Minister and President of UMNO, Mahathir Mohamad.

== Supreme Council election results ==
=== Permanent Chairman ===
Candidate	Delegates' votes	Division nominated
Sulaiman Ninam Shah	1,498 votes	
Abdul Raman Suliman	359 votes	

=== Deputy Permanent Chairman ===
Candidate	Delegates' votes	Division nominated
Shoib Ahmad	1,357 votes	
Azman Attar Othman	400 votes	
Idris Ibrahim	100 votes	

=== President ===
Candidate	Delegates' votes	Division nominated
Mahathir Mohamad	won uncontested	

=== Deputy President ===
Candidate	Delegates' votes	Division nominated
Anwar Ibrahim	won uncontested	

=== Vice Presidents ===
Candidate	Delegates' votes (max. 3)	Division nominated
Mohammad Najib Abdul Razak	1,483 votes	
Abdullah Ahmad Badawi	1,053 votes	
Muhammad Muhammad Taib	1,045 votes	
Ramli Ngah Talib	696 votes	
Syed Hamid Albar	653 votes	
Muhyiddin Yassin	545 votes	
Yob Tajuddin Kulub Ismail	111 votes	

=== Supreme Council Members ===
Candidate	Delegates' votes (max. 25)	Division nominated
Abdul Hamid Othman	1,517 votes	
Abdul Ghani Othman	1,486 votes	
Mustapa Mohamed	1,484 votes	
Mohd Ali Mohd Rustam	1,428 votes	
Mohd Zin Abdul Ghani	1,382 votes	
Mohamed Yusof Mohamed Noor	1,354 votes	
Mohd Khalil Yaakob	1,266 votes	
Affifudin Omar	1,222 votes	
Shahidan Kassim	1,178 votes	
Tajol Rosli Mohd Ghazali	1,172 votes	
Abdul Kadir Sheikh Fadzir	1,153 votes	
Wan Mokhtar Ahmad	1,152 votes	
Ibrahim Saad	1,148 votes	
Hasan Arifin	1,118 votes	
Osu Sukam	1,104 votes	
Raja Ariffin Raja Sulaiman	1,056 votes	
Suleiman Mohamed	1,021 votes	
Mohamed Nazri Abdul Aziz	1,018 votes	
Mohd Shafie Apdal	1,005 votes	
Mohd. Khalid Mohd. Yunus	984 votes	
Megat Junid Megat Ayub	976 votes	
Zaleha Ismail	960 votes	
Salleh Said Keruak	954 votes	
Abu Hassan Omar	954 votes	
Shahrizat Abdul Jalil	915 votes	
Ibrahim Ali	889 votes	
Tengku Adnan Tengku Mansor	886 votes	
Sabbaruddin Chik	864 votes	
Tengku Mahmud Mansor	836 votes	
Railey Jeffrey	741 votes	
Kamal Salleh	713 votes	
Napsiah Omar	673 votes	
Badruddin Amiruldin	658 votes	
Abdul Rahim Abu Bakar	651 votes	
Mohd Radzi Manan	650 votes	
Abdullah Fadzil Che Wan	619 votes	
Abdul Khalid Ibrahim	541 votes	
Hanifah Noordin	513 votes	
Fauzi Abdul Rahman	502 votes	
Abdul Hamid Pawanteh	487 votes	
Othman Abdul	465 votes	
Mohd. Nakhaie Ahmad	463 votes	
Ishak Ismail	450 votes	
Zainal Abidin Ab. Kadir	350 votes	
Ahmad Shahibuddin Mohd Noor	335 votes	
Abu Bakar Daud	298 votes	
Azrat Gull Amirzat Gull	242 votes	
Mohd Idris Tulis	212 votes	
Baharom Abdul Ghani	211 votes	
Mohd. Zihin Mohd. Hassan	200 votes	
Syed Abdullah Syed Mahusin	198 votes	
Mohamed Kamal Hussain	159 votes	
Zainol Abidin Johari	111 votes	
Edward Sinsua	94 votes	
Alias Mohamed	82 votes	

== See also ==
- 1999 Malaysian general election
- Fifth Mahathir cabinet
