= 1987 UMNO leadership election =

1987 United Malays National Organisation leadership election
- 24 April 1987
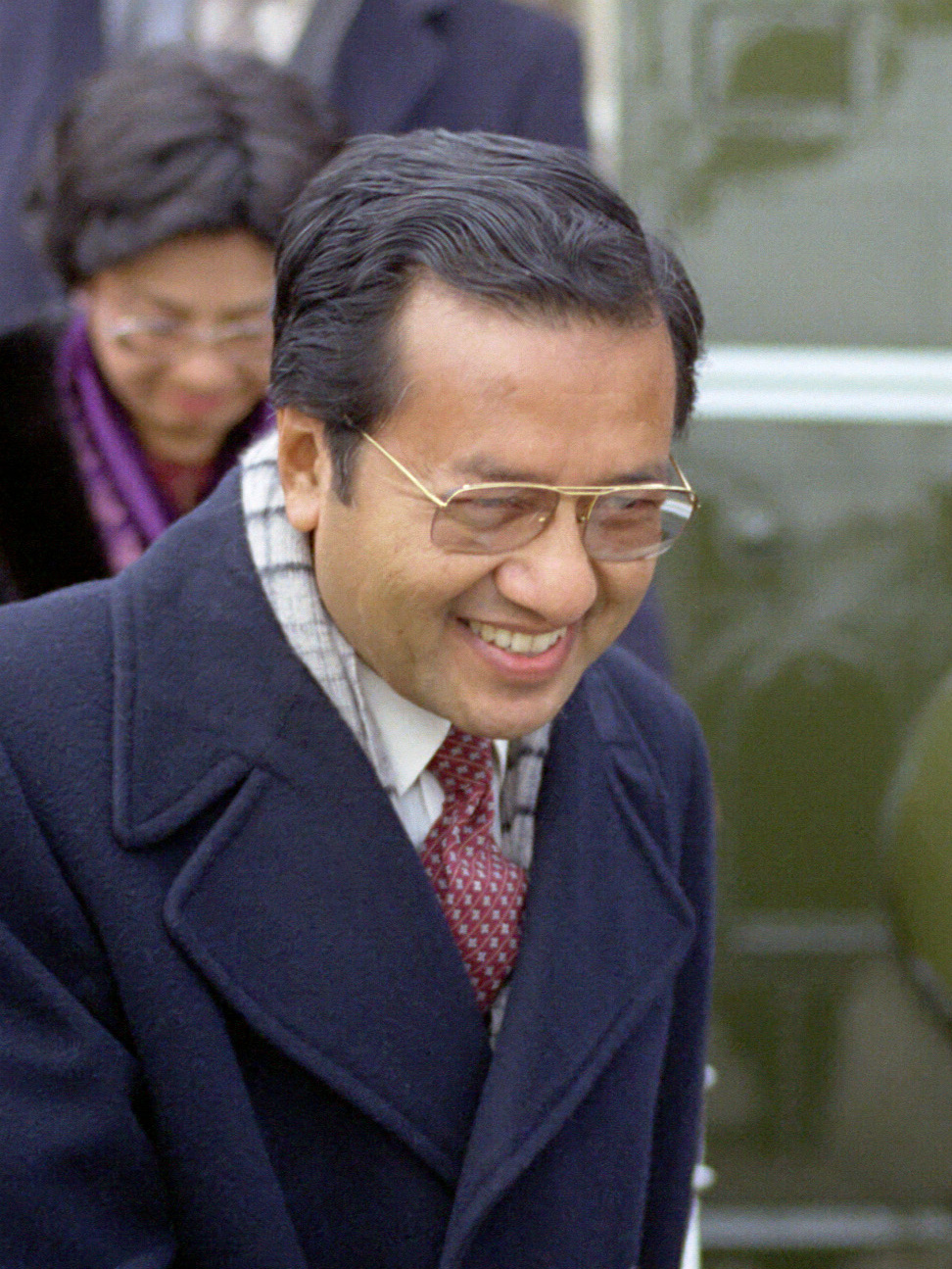
Candidate	Mahathir Mohamad	Tengku Razaleigh Hamzah
Popular vote	761	718
Percentage	51.4%	48.5%
President of UMNO before election
Mahathir Mohamad
President of UMNO
Mahathir Mohamad

A leadership election was held by the United Malays National Organisation (UMNO) party on 24 April 1987. It was won by incumbent Prime Minister and President of UMNO, Mahathir Mohamad.

== Supreme Council election results ==
=== Permanent Chairman ===
Candidate	Delegates' votes	Division nominated
Sulaiman Ninam Shah	850 votes	
Shamsuri Salleh	453 votes	
Mohd. Nor Mohd. Dom	106 votes	
R.M. Idris	32 votes	
Baharom Shah Indera	19 votes	
Valid votes	1460 votes	
Invalid votes	19 votes	
Grand total	1479 votes	

=== Deputy Permanent Chairman ===
Candidate	Delegates' votes	Division nominated
Shoib Ahmad	533 votes	
Abdul Rahman Mahmud	313 votes	
Shamsuri Salleh	310 votes	
Mohd. Amin Daud	203 votes	
Azman Attar Othman	107 votes	
Valid votes	1466 votes	
Invalid votes	13 votes	
Grand total	1479 votes	

=== President ===
Candidate	Delegates' votes	Division nominated
Mahathir Mohamad	761 votes	88
Tengku Razaleigh Hamzah	718 votes	37
Valid votes	1479 votes	
Invalid votes	nil	
Grand total	1479 votes	

=== Deputy President ===
Candidate	Delegates' votes	Division nominated
Ghafar Baba	739 votes	
Musa Hitam	699 votes	
Valid votes	1438 votes	
Invalid votes	41 votes	
Grand total	1479 votes	

=== Vice Presidents ===
Candidates	Delegates' votes (max. 3)	Division nominated
Wan Mokhtar Ahmad	935 votes	
Abdullah Ahmad Badawi	879 votes	
Anwar Ibrahim	850 votes	
Rais Yatim	690 votes	
Ramli Ngah Talib	667 votes	
Harun Idris	398 votes	
Valid votes	4419 votes	
Invalid votes	6 votes	
Grand total	4425 votes	

=== Supreme Council Members ===
Candidates	Delegates' votes (max. 25)	Division nominated
Zainal Abidin Zin	717 votes	
	votes	
	votes	
	votes	
	votes	
	votes	
	votes	
	votes	
	votes	
	votes	
	votes	
	votes	
	votes	
	votes	
	votes	
	votes	
	votes	
	votes	
	votes	
	votes	
	votes	
	votes	
	votes	
	votes	
	votes	

== See also ==
- 1990 Malaysian general election
- Third Mahathir cabinet
