= UMNO leadership elections =

This page lists the results of leadership elections held by the United Malays National Organisation. The bonus votes and quota system were in use until 2013. Elections held since 2013 have been on an indirect election with an electoral college comprising electors representing the party's 191 divisions.

A leadership election may result in a new leader, or may confirm the status quo. If the party in question is in government, the election of a new leader will result in a new Prime Minister, Minister, Chief Minister; if the party is the opposition, the election of a new leader will result in a new Opposition Leader, Shadow Minister.

== Process ==
=== Since 2013 ===
The UMNO's bonus votes and quota system were succeeded by the indirect election with an electoral college comprising electors representing the party's 191 divisions, involving 146,500 UMNO grassroot members got to vote instead of previously limited to only 2,000 over delegates. Umno has 3.3 million members. Delegates from the branches who previously could only choose division office bearers, now have the liberty to choose leaders up to the Supreme Council. And under the previous system, only 2,500 delegates were eligible to choose the party's top line up.

All the UMNO members who plan to scale the party ranks can register to contest for any position. The only requirement is to submit their nomination forms to Wanita, Pemuda, Puteri wings and Supreme Council positions before the deadline for nomination submission.

The new party polling system has opened the doors for anyone registered as a party member for at least one term (three years) to contest at the divisional level.

As for the Supreme Council — members, vice presidents, deputy president and even the president — the minimum requirement is that they have to be division office bearers for at least one term (three years).

== 1946-1949 leadership elections ==
- Onn Jaafar won uncontested every year from 1946 to 1949.

Onn Jaafar won uncontested as Yang di-Pertua of UMNO on 11 May 1946.

== 1950 leadership election ==
- Onn Jaafar won 66 votes against 3 votes for Tengku Mahmood Mahyideen of Kelantan UMNO.

Onn Jaafar had announced his intention to resign as leader on 12 June 1950.

Few months later, Onn Jaafar was re-elected Yang di-Pertua of UMNO on 27 August 1950, the first day of 5th UMNO Annual General Assembly.

== 1951 leadership election ==
- Tunku Abdul Rahman, 57 votes
- Chik Mohamad Yusuf, 11 votes
- Ahmad Fuad Hassan, 7 votes

An election for the leadership of the United Malays National Organisation was triggered by Onn Jaafar's announcement on 25 August 1951, of his intention to resign as leader after years of conflict between Onn's faction of the party and his rival factions. The party's annual general assembly, already scheduled to occur from 25 August to 26 August 1951 in Kuala Lumpur's Majestic Hotel, was organised the party leadership election at the same venue. The party announced Tunku Abdul Rahman as its new Yang di-Pertua on 26 August 1951.

Ahmad Fuad Hassan who was defeated in the party leadership election, left UMNO with his faction. He then became the first Yang di-Pertua of Pan-Malayan Islamic Organisation.

== 1952-1969 leadership elections ==
- Tunku Abdul Rahman won uncontested every year from 1952 to 1969.

== 1972 leadership election ==
- Abdul Razak Hussein won uncontested

An election for the leadership of the United Malays National Organisation was triggered by Tunku Abdul Rahman's announcement on 23 January 1971 of his intention to resign as leader. On 23 January 1971, Abdul Razak Hussein was selected to serve as interim leader.

Abdul Razak Hussein won uncontested as President of UMNO on the deadline for nomination confirmation. However, UMNO held its party election for other Supreme Council top posts on 25 June 1972.

== 1975 leadership election ==
- Abdul Razak Hussein won uncontested

Abdul Razak Hussein won uncontested as President of UMNO on the deadline for nomination confirmation. However, UMNO held its party election for other Supreme Council top posts in 1975.

== 1978 leadership election ==
- Hussein Onn 898 votes, nominated by
- Sulaiman Ahmad "Palestin" 250 votes, nominated by 1 UMNO division

== 1981 leadership election ==
- Mahathir Mohamad won uncontested

Mahathir Mohamad won uncontested as President of UMNO on the deadline for nomination confirmation. However, UMNO held its party election for other Supreme Council top posts in June 1981.

== 1984 leadership election ==
- Mahathir Mohamad won uncontested

Mahathir Mohamad won uncontested as President of UMNO on the deadline for nomination confirmation. However, UMNO held its party election for other Supreme Council top posts in 1984.

== 1987 leadership election ==
- Mahathir Mohamad 761 votes, nominated by 88 UMNO divisions
- Tengku Razaleigh Hamzah 718 votes, nominated by 37 UMNO divisions

Mahathir Mohamad confirmed his nomination on 9 April 1987 and won the election as President of UMNO on 24 April 1987. However, UMNO held its party election for other Supreme Council top posts on 24 April 1987.

Tengku Razaleigh Hamzah with his faction left UMNO to set up Parti Melayu Semangat 46.

== 1990 leadership election ==
- Mahathir Mohamad won uncontested, nominated by 130 UMNO divisions

Mahathir Mohamad won uncontested as President of UMNO on the deadline for nomination confirmation. However, UMNO held its party election for other Supreme Council top posts on 30 November 1990.

== 1993 leadership election ==
- Mahathir Mohamad won uncontested, nominated by 152 UMNO divisions

Mahathir Mohamad won uncontested as President of UMNO on the deadline for nomination confirmation, 21 October 1993. However, UMNO held its party election for other Supreme Council top posts on 4 November 1993.

== 1996 leadership election ==
- Mahathir Mohamad won uncontested

Mahathir Mohamad won uncontested as President of UMNO on the deadline for nomination confirmation, 7 July 1996. However, UMNO held its party election for other Supreme Council top posts on 10 October 1996.

== 2000 leadership election ==
- Mahathir Mohamad won uncontested, nominated 164 UMNO divisions
- Tengku Razaleigh Hamzah did not qualify, nominated by 1 UMNO division

Mahathir Mohamad won uncontested as President of UMNO on the deadline for nomination confirmation, 14 April 2000. However, UMNO held its party election for other Supreme Council top posts on 11 May 2000 after it was postponed to pave way for the 10th General Election. The election was initially scheduled to be held in 1999.

Tengku Razaleigh Hamzah was nominated by Tanah Merah division, but he did not qualify to be a contestant when he could not get the required minimum nominations from the divisions. The quota system required the president's post must be nominated by at least 50 out of the 165 UMNO divisions.

== 2004 leadership election ==
- Abdullah Ahmad Badawi won uncontested, nominated by 190 UMNO divisions
- Tengku Razaleigh Hamzah did not qualify, nominated by 1 UMNO division

An election for the leadership of the United Malays National Organisation was prompted by outgoing Prime Minister Mahathir Mohamad's announcement on 22 June 2002 that he would not lead the United Malays National Organisation into another general election. On 31 October 2003, Abdullah Ahmad Badawi was selected to serve as interim leader.

Abdullah Ahmad Badawi won uncontested as President of UMNO on the deadline for nomination confirmation, 25 August 2004. However, UMNO held its party election for other Supreme Council top posts on 23 September 2004 after it was postponed to pave way for the 11th General Election. The election was initially scheduled to be held in 2003.

Tengku Razaleigh Hamzah was nominated by Gua Musang division, but he did not qualify to be a contestant when he could not get the required minimum nominations from the divisions. The quota system required the president's post must be nominated by at least 58 out of the 191 UMNO divisions.

== 2009 leadership election ==
- Najib Razak won uncontested, nominated by 190 UMNO divisions
- Tengku Razaleigh Hamzah did not qualify, nominated by 1 UMNO division

An election for the leadership of the United Malays National Organisation was prompted by outgoing Prime Minister Abdullah Ahmad Badawi's announcement on 8 October 2008 that he would not lead the United Malays National Organisation into another general election.

Najib Razak won uncontested as President of UMNO on the deadline for nomination confirmation, 21 February 2009. However, UMNO held its party election for other Supreme Council top posts on 26 March 2009 after it was postponed to pave way for the 12th General Election. The election was initially scheduled to be held in 2007.

Tengku Razaleigh Hamzah was nominated by Gua Musang division, but he did not qualify to be a contestant when he could not get the required minimum nominations from the divisions. The quota system required the president's post must be nominated by at least 58 out of the 191 UMNO divisions.

== 2013 leadership election ==
- Najib Razak won uncontested, nominated by Muhyiddin Yassin and seconded by Tengku Adnan Tengku Mansor
- no other nomination paper was sent on the deadline for nomination submission

Najib Razak won uncontested as President of UMNO on the deadline for nomination confirmation, 21 September 2013. However, UMNO held its party election for other Supreme Council top posts on 19 October 2013 after it was postponed to pave way for the 13th General Election. The election was initially scheduled to be held in 2012.

The UMNO's bonus votes and quota system were succeeded by the indirect election with an electoral college comprising electors representing the party's 191 divisions, involving 146,500 UMNO grassroot members got to vote instead of previously limited to only 2,000 over delegates.

== 2018 leadership election ==
(To be held no later than 2018)

The election was initially scheduled to be held in 2016, however it was postponed to pave way for the 14th General Election.

The following 3 prominent members contested as President of UMNO:

- Ahmad Zahid Hamidi Current Acting President, former Acting Deputy President and vice-president of UMNO
- Tengku Razaleigh Hamzah Former candidate for UMNO's president in 1988 and Gua Musang UMNO Chief
- Khairy Jamaluddin UMNO's Youth Chief

== 2023 leadership election ==
- Ahmad Zahid Hamidi won uncontested, after the UMNO general assembly has given consent to a motion for the posts of president and deputy president not to be contested on this election.

== 2027 leadership election ==
A leadership election will hold by the United Malays National Organisation (UMNO) party in March 2026.
