= Ahmad Zahid Hamidi =

Malaysian politician

Yang Amat Berhormat Dato' Seri Diraja Dr. Ahmad Zahid Hamidi SPSN SJMK SPDK SPMP SSAP DP DUNM PNBS DPMK DMSM DPMP AMP JP PPA PKN PPT PJK PhD (UPM) BA (UM) MP
- أحمد زاهد حميدي
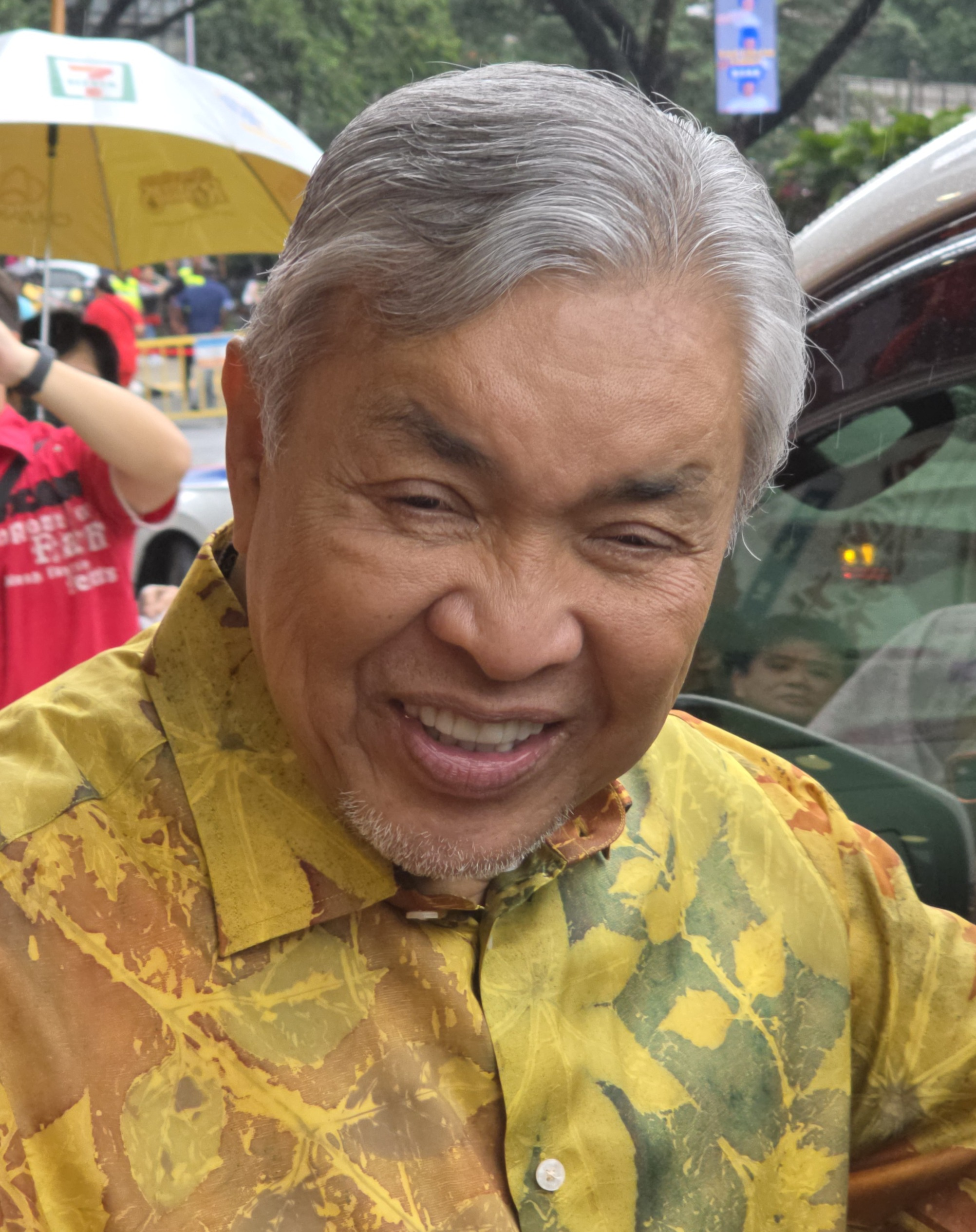
- Zahid in 2026

11th and 14th Deputy Prime Minister of Malaysia
- Incumbent
- Assumed office 3 December 2022 Serving with Fadillah Yusof
- Monarchs: Abdullah (2022–2024); Ibrahim (2024–present)
- Prime Minister: Anwar Ibrahim
- Preceded by: Ismail Sabri Yaakob (2021)
- In office 29 July 2015 – 10 May 2018
- Monarchs: Abdul Halim (2015–2016); Muhammad V (2016–2018)
- Prime Minister: Najib Razak
- Preceded by: Muhyiddin Yassin
- Succeeded by: Wan Azizah Wan Ismail

14th Leader of the Opposition
- In office 18 July 2018 – 10 March 2019
- Monarchs: Muhammad V (2018–2019); Abdullah (2019–2019)
- Prime Minister: Mahathir Mohamad
- Preceded by: Wan Azizah Wan Ismail
- Succeeded by: Ismail Sabri Yaakob

8th President of the United Malays National Organisation (ex officio: Chairman of Barisan Nasional)
- Incumbent
- Assumed office 30 June 2018; Acting: 12 May 2018 – 30 June 2018; On leave: 18 December 2018 – 30 June 2019
- Deputy: Hishammuddin Hussein (acting); Mohamad Hasan
- Preceded by: Najib Razak
Ministerial portfolios
| 2008–2009 | Minister in the Prime Minister's Department |
| 2009–2013 | Minister of Defence |
| 2013–2018 | Minister of Home Affairs |
| 2022–present | Minister of Rural and Regional Development |

Member of the Malaysian Parliament for Bagan Datuk
- Incumbent
- Assumed office 25 April 1995
- Preceded by: Mohamed Jamrah
- Majority: 14,830 (1995); 4,617 (1999); 12,539 (2004); 2,692 (2008); 2,108 (2013); 5,073 (2018); 348 (2022)

Personal details
- Born: Ahmad Zahid bin Hamidi; 4 January 1953 (age 73) Bagan Datuk, Perak, Federation of Malaya
- Citizenship: Malaysia
- Party: UMNO (1973–present)
- Other political affiliations: Barisan Nasional (1973–present)
- Spouse: Hamidah Khamis
- Children: 5
- Parent(s): Raden Hamidi Raden Abdul Fatah (father); Tuminah Abdul Jalil (mother)
- Education: University of Malaya (BA); University of Putra Malaysia (PhD)
- Occupation: Politician; banker
- Website: Official blog
- Ahmad Zahid Hamidi on Facebook; Ahmad Zahid Hamidi on Parliament of Malaysia

Ahmad Zahid bin Hamidi (Jawi: أحمد زاهد بن حميدي; born 4 January 1953) is a Malaysian politician who is the deputy prime minister since 2022. A president of UMNO since 2018, he represented Bagan Datuk in Dewan Rakyat since 1995. Zahid is also the rural and regional development minister since 2022, as well as the leader and the chairman of the coalition Barisan Nasional (BN) since May 2018.

Born in Perak. He served in several cabinet positions under former Prime Ministers Abdullah Ahmad Badawi and Najib Razak from March 2008 to May 2018 and served as deputy prime minister from July 2015 to May 2018. Zahid became the president of the UMNO in 2018 following the party's defeat in the 2018 election. He served as the 14th Leader of the Opposition from July 2018 to March 2019. Under his leadership, UMNO and BN won at the 2021 Malacca state election and the 2022 Johor state election, but achieved its worst result in Malaysian history at the 2022 federal election. After BN formed a coalition government with Pakatan Harapan and other regional parties, he was appointed Deputy Prime Minister of Malaysia alongside Fadillah Yusof in December 2022, making him the first person to be appointed to this position twice, under two different administrations.

Zahid has faced several investigations and charges for corruption during his career.

== Early life ==
Ahmad Zahid bin Hamidi was born on 4 January 1953 in Bagan Datuk, Perak, the eldest son of nine children (seven sons and two daughters) in the family. On 1 October 2011, his mother, Tuminah Abdul Jalil, died of a stroke and heart complication in her hometown Sungai Nipah Darat, Bagan Datoh. She was previously hospitalized at the Tuanku Mizan Armed Forces Hospital in Kuala Lumpur. Both of his parents are Indonesian-born Malaysians.

He was raised by a Chinese foster-father, Chen Jin Ting and sold ice cream together for six years with his foster family when he was in elementary school. Chen was not highly educated and would cycle from his house at Simpang Tiga, Hilir Perak to about three kilometers away selling ice cream. Chen was married with his foster mother, Guo Jin Luan. His father later died in 1999, more than ten days after the general election of that year. Following accusations that he was anti-Chinese, he responded asking: "Am I anti-Chinese when I have a Chinese foster father?".

== Education and early career ==
Before venturing into politics, Ahmad Zahid studied at Sekolah Izzuddin Shah before continuing at University of Malaya for his bachelor's degree. He graduated in 1976. He also holds a Certificate in Banking from Bank Negara Malaysia before being a banker for OCBC. He then became one of the directors of Bank Simpanan Nasional (1995–1998) and Permodalan Nasional Berhad (PNB). During his corporate career, he was a marketing executive for Amanah Saham Nasional Berhad (ASNB), executive director for Scandinavian Motors Sdn Bhd, chief executive officer of Kretam Holdings Berhad, chairman of Tekala Corporation Berhad, Seng Hup Berhad and Ramatex Berhad. In 1999 he became the chairman of Syarikat Perumahan Negara Berhad (SPNB). In 2008, he received his PhD in communication at University of Putra Malaysia after he spent eight years to complete his thesis.

== Political career ==
=== Political secretary and UMNO youth chief ===
In 1986, Zahid was appointed political secretary to Najib Razak during the latter's term as youth minister (1986–1990) and then minister of defence (1990–1995).

He was elected as UMNO Youth Chief in 1996. He was once the Chief of UMNO youth Bagan Datoh branch, the Vice Chief for the state of Perak UMNO Youth, and Head of the UMNO Communication for UMNO Youth.

=== Election to Parliament and UMNO Supreme Council ===
In the 1995 general election, Ahmad Zahid Hamidi became a Member of Parliament after winning the Bagan Datok parliamentary seat in Perak.

In the 1999 general election, Zahid was re-elected as Member of Parliament for Bagan Datok. He was elected to the UMNO Supreme Council in the following year.

=== Ministerial career ===
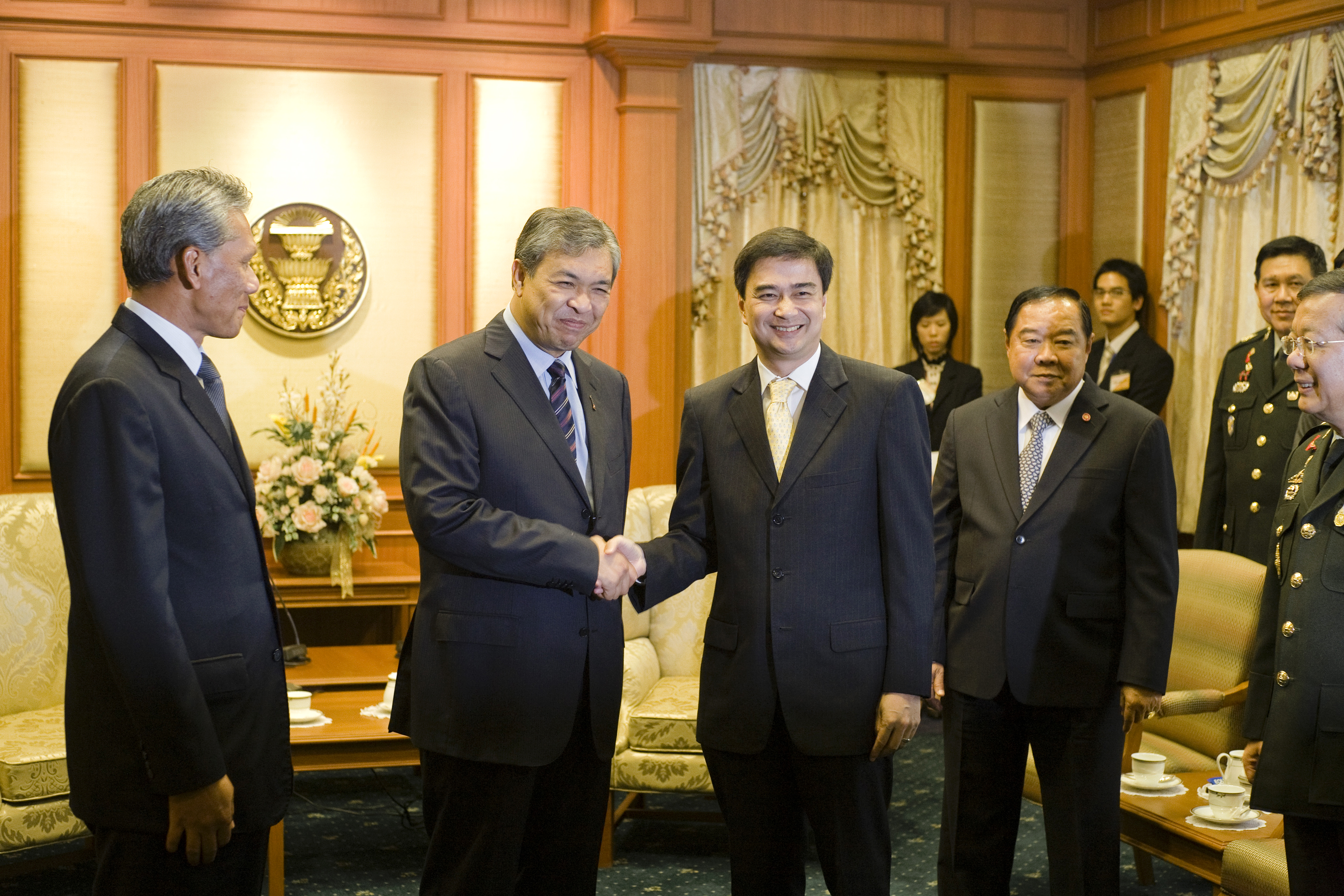
Zahid with PM Thailand Abhisit Vejjajiva in 2010

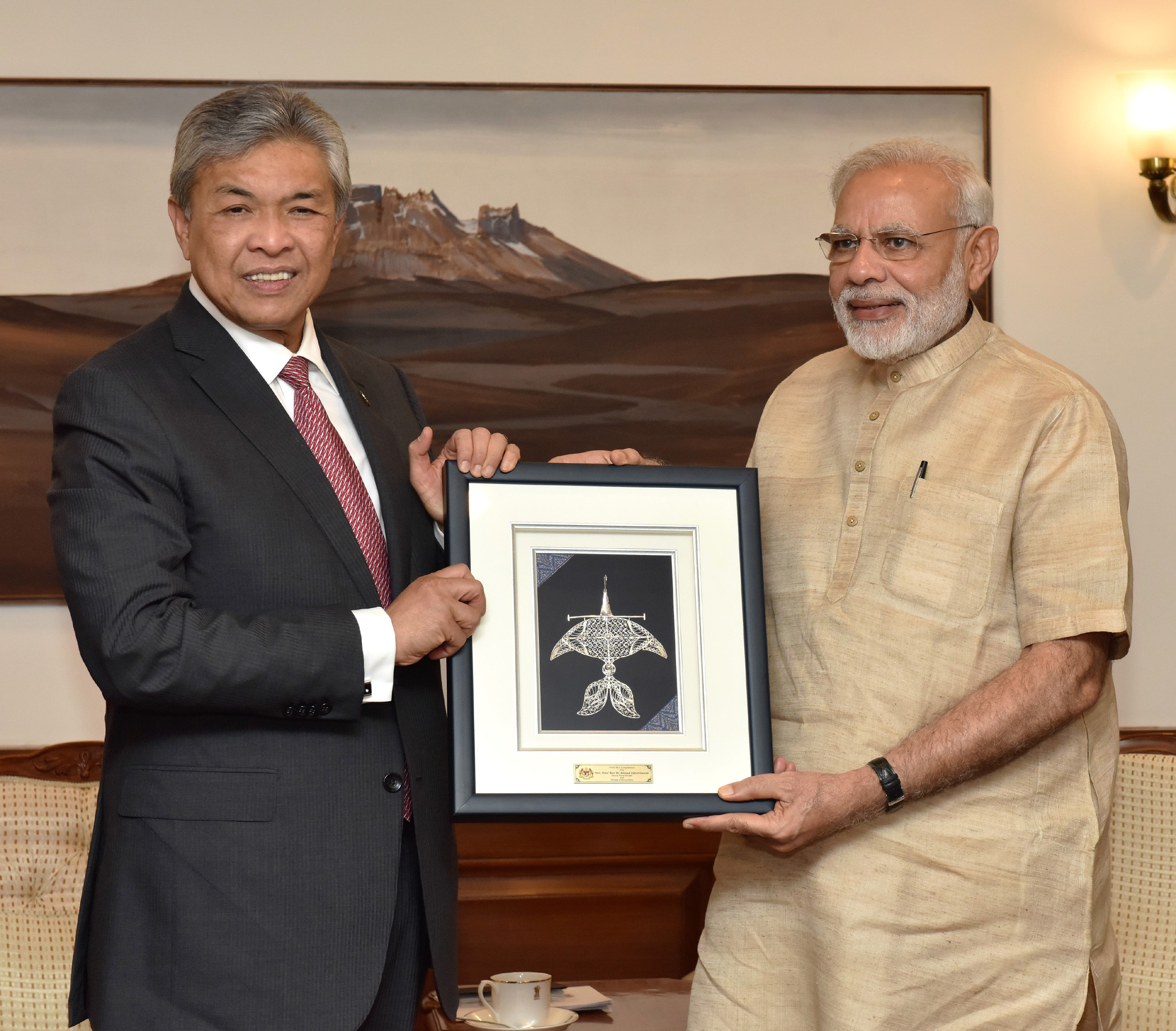
Zahid with PM India Narendra Modi in 2016

After he won the seat for a third consecutive time in the 2004 general elections, Zahid was appointed as Deputy Tourism Minister by Prime Minister Abdullah Ahmad Badawi. While being a Deputy Minister, he pursued a Doctor of Philosophy degree from UPM, thesis entitled Barisan Nasional Manifesto As Agenda for Malay Language Newspaper During the General Election Campaign.

In the political tsunami of 2008, Zahid again retained his Bagan Datok parliamentary seat at a time when many BN party heavyweights were trounced. He was then appointed as Minister in the Prime Minister's Department. In the April 2009 cabinet reshuffle, Zahid was appointed Minister of Defence by Prime Minister Najib Razak.

He was able to retain his parliamentary seat of Bagan Datok in the 2013 election, although with a decreased majority. He was appointed Minister of Home Affairs in 2013, replacing Hishammuddin Hussein, who took Zahid's previous position at the Ministry of Defence.

In July 2015, he was appointed the country's 11th Deputy Prime Minister in a cabinet reshuffle.

=== UMNO President ===
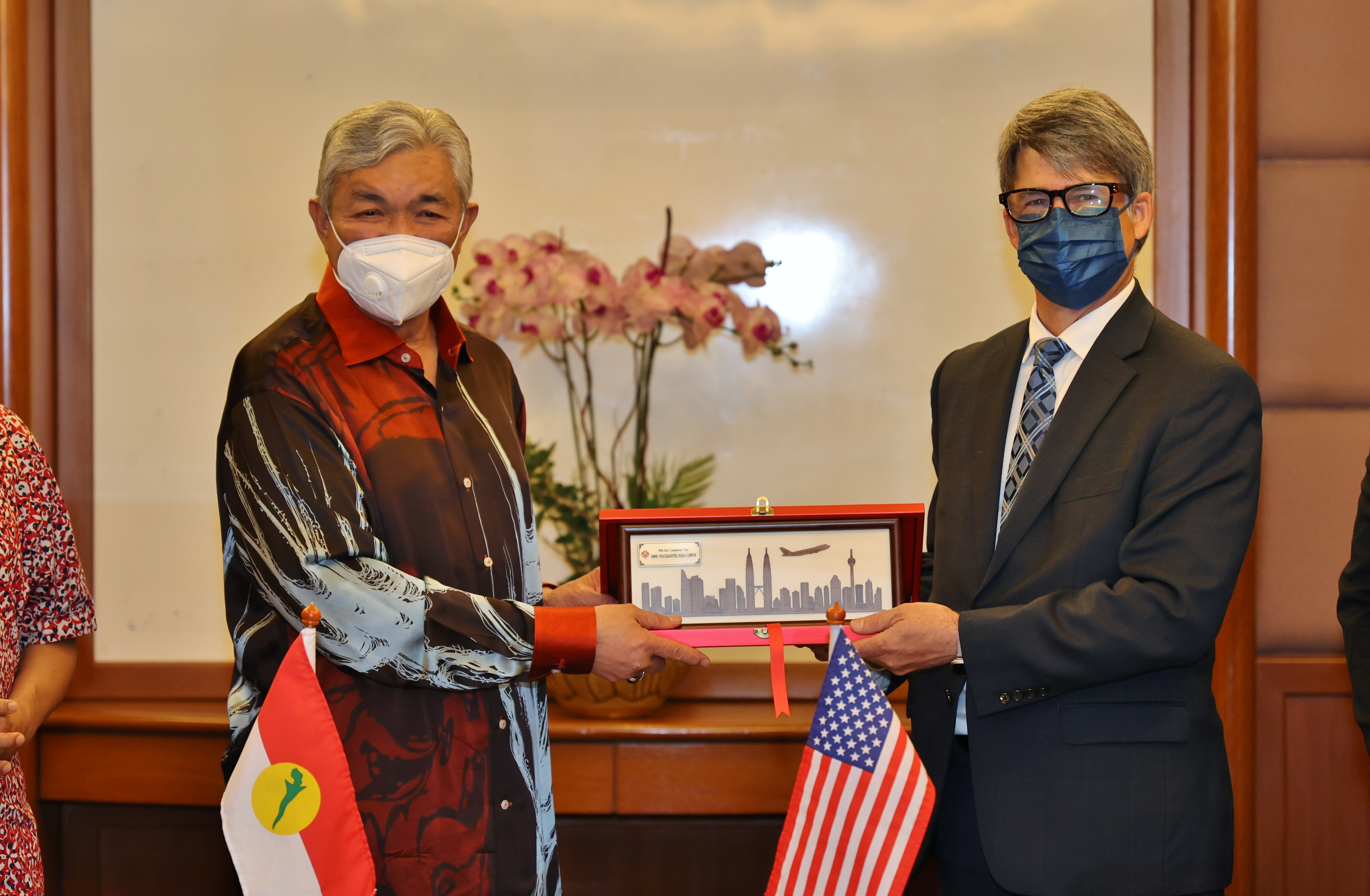
Zahid and US Ambassador Brian D. McFeeters in 2022

In the 2018 UMNO leadership election, Zahid gained more votes than his rivals, Khairy Jamaluddin and Tengku Razaleigh Hamzah, making him the new President of UMNO and also the first Leader of the Opposition from BN coalition.

After facing weeks of mounting pressure to step down as party president and calls for fresh party polls, Zahid finally announces his decision to temporary step down and take leave on 18 December 2018. His deputy, Mohamad Hasan, acted the position of leading the party. On 30 June 2019, he announced his return from "garden leave" back to active role as UMNO President.

In the 2022 election, he led the party to achieve its worst result in Malaysian history, only winning 26 out of 222 seats (BN won 30 seats). Several key figures including Tengku Razaleigh Hamzah, Mahdzir Khalid, Azeez Rahim, Tengku Zafrul Aziz and Khairy Jamaluddin, lost to either PN or PH candidates. UMNO/BN was also defeated at several state elections held in Pahang and Perak, and lost all seats in Perlis. Zahid himself was re-elected with a slim majority. Following the election defeat, he faced internal pressures to resign as the UMNO President.

== Controversies and issues ==
=== Legal suits ===
Ahmad Zahid had been sued by businessman Amir Bazli Abdullah for allegedly punching him in the face on 16 January 2006 at the Country Heights recreational club in Kajang, Selangor, causing the latter to suffer a nasal bone fracture and a swollen left eye. The case was pursued in the civil courts for six years before the matter was settled out of court.

=== Controversial statements ===
Shortly after the Black 505 rallies following the 13th Malaysian General Election due to claims of electoral fraud and vote manipulation, he said that Malaysians who are unhappy with the country's political system and dislike the BN government should "get lost" from the country. This statement has raised discontentment among the citizens, putting a serious question mark over his political future in a multiracial society. The statement was made after a series of street demonstrations led by opposition parties that has refused to accept the results of the 13th Malaysian General election. His first act as Home Minister was to order a crack down against opposition leaders and dissent, landing him in a bigger controversy with sedition laws being used to attempt to suppress the voices of opposition parties.

During a speech in Malacca, Zahid was recorded endorsing the police policy of "shoot to kill" when arresting dangerous criminals, including backing a certain group of gangsters.

In October 2018, after the brutally devastating earthquake and tsunami that struck Central Sulawesi on 28 September 2018, Ahmad Zahid Hamidi was condemned by Indonesian public for calling the natural disasters in Central Sulawesi were "God's (Allah) rage against the LGBT community in Indonesia because they are allowed to live in Indonesia" without realising Malaysia was sent humanitarian aid to the victims of the natural disasters in Central Sulawesi.

=== Corruption charges ===
On 18 October 2018, Zahid was arrested by the Malaysian Anti-Corruption Commission (MACC) and charged in court the following day on 45 counts of criminal breach of trust (CBT), abuse of power and money laundering involving a total of RM114 million (about US$27.4 million) funds of Yayasan Akalbudi. On 14 December 2018, he was charged with another CBT offence, involving RM10 million. On 20 February 2019, Zahid was again charged with an additional CBT charge, involving RM260,000.

On 26 June 2019, Zahid became the subject of 7 new corruption charges involving S$4.2 million (RM12.8 million) which he allegedly received from a foreign visa (VLN) system operator totalling RM42.76 million under his capacity as the Home Minister then. On the next day, he faced 33 more charges totalling RM42.76 million involving the VLN system two years before. The latest charges brought the total number of outstanding charges to 87.

On 24 January 2022, Zahid has been ordered to enter his defence against all 47 criminal breach of trust (CBT), corruption and money laundering charges involving funds.

On 17 February 2022, former prime minister Muhyiddin Yassin has divulged more details regarding his claims that Ahmad Zahid sought his intervention in court cases. Muhyiddin said Zahid visited a few days after he took office as prime minister with a pile of files. He said he refused to interfere in Zahid and Najib Razak's court cases, which incited their anger and resulted in attempts to destabilise the government.

On 23 February 2022, Mahathir Mohamad said he had a meeting with Zahid before the former became prime minister in 2018. Mahathir said Zahid went to his house with three other individuals and tried to be nice to him to avoid being charged for his misconduct when Umno was in power.

=== Acquittal ===
On 23 September 2022, Zahid was acquitted by the Malaysian High Court of 40 bribery charges linked to a visa scheme, and seven charges for allegedly receiving bribes when he was home minister from 2013 to 2018. On 4 September 2023, Zahid received a dismissal not amount to acquittal on the remaining cases related to the Yayasan Akalbudi.

== Personal life ==
He is married to Hamidah Khamis and has 5 children. He is fluent in Standard Malay, local Perak Malay and Javanese. He speaks English with limited fluency, and also speaks some Mandarin.

== Election results ==
Parliament of Malaysia
| Year | Constituency | Candidate | Votes | Pct | Opponent(s) | Votes | Pct | Ballots cast | Majority | Turnout |
|---|---|---|---|---|---|---|---|---|---|---|
| 1995 | P072 Bagan Datok | Ahmad Zahid Hamidi (UMNO) | 17,646 | 86.24% | Asha'ri Marsom (S46) | 2,816 | 13.76% | 21,937 | 14,830 | 62.02% |
| 1999 | P072 Bagan Datok | Ahmad Zahid Hamidi (UMNO) | 12,938 | 60.86% | Mohamad Dahalan Arhsad (keADILan) | 8,321 | 39.14% | 22,164 | 4,617 | 60.24% |
| 2004 | P075 Bagan Datok | Ahmad Zahid Hamidi (UMNO) | 17,049 | 79.08% | Ayyathurai Achutharaman (PKR) | 4,510 | 20.92% | 22,690 | 12,539 | 66.38% |
| 2008 | P075 Bagan Datok | Ahmad Zahid Hamidi (UMNO) | 13,115 | 55.72% | Madzi Hasan (PKR) | 10,423 | 44.28% | 24,414 | 2,692 | 70.42% |
| 2013 | P075 Bagan Datok | Ahmad Zahid Hamidi (UMNO) | 17,176 | 53.27% | Madhi Hasan (PKR) | 15,068 | 46.73% | 33,069 | 2,108 | 82.83% |
| 2018 | P075 Bagan Datuk | Ahmad Zahid Hamidi (UMNO) | 18,909 | 51.37% | Pakhrurrazi Arshad (PKR) | 13,836 | 37.59% | 37,620 | 5,073 | 79.89% |
| 2018 | P075 Bagan Datuk | Ahmad Zahid Hamidi (UMNO) | 18,909 | 51.37% | Ata Abdul Muneim Hasan Adli (PAS) | 4,061 | 11.03% | 37,620 | 5,073 | 79.89% |
| 2022 | P075 Bagan Datuk | Ahmad Zahid Hamidi (UMNO) | 16,578 | 39.61% | Shamsul Iskandar Mohd Akin (PKR) | 16,230 | 38.78% | 41,856 | 348 | 71.94% |
| 2022 | P075 Bagan Datuk | Ahmad Zahid Hamidi (UMNO) | 16,578 | 39.61% | Muhammad Faiz Na'aman (BERSATU) | 8,822 | 21.08% | 41,856 | 348 | 71.94% |
| 2022 | P075 Bagan Datuk | Ahmad Zahid Hamidi (UMNO) | 16,578 | 39.61% | Mohamed Tawfik Ismail (IND) | 226 | 0.54% | 41,856 | 348 | 71.94% |

== Honours ==
=== Honours of Malaysia ===
- Malaysia
  - Recipient of the General Service Medal (PPA)
  - Recipient of the National Sovereignty Medal (PKN) (2014)
  - Recipient of the 15th Yang di-Pertuan Agong Installation Medal (2017)
  - Recipient of the 17th Yang di-Pertuan Agong Installation Medal (2024)
- Perak
  - Grand Commander of the Perak Family Order of Sultan Nazrin Shah (SPSN) – Dato' Seri Diraja (2015)
  - Grand Commander of the Order of the Perak State Crown (SPMP) – Dato' Seri (2008)
  - Commander of the Order of the Perak State Crown (DPMP) – Dato' (2001)
  - Member of the Order of the Perak State Crown (AMP) (1992)
  - Recipient of the Distinguished Conduct Medal (PPT) (1987)
  - Justice of the Peace (JP) (1996)
- Kelantan
  - Grand Commander of the Order of the Life of the Crown of Kelantan (SJMK) – Dato' (2009)
  - Commander of the Order of the Crown of Kelantan (DPMK) – Dato' (2005)
- Malacca
  - Grand Principal of the Premier and Exalted Order of Malacca (DUNM) – Datuk Seri Utama (2015)
  - Companion of the Exalted Order of Malacca (DMSM) – Datuk (1993)
  - Recipient of the Meritorious Service Medal (PJK) (1989)
- Pahang
  - Grand Companion of the Order of Sultan Ahmad Shah of Pahang (SSAP) – Dato' Sri (2008)
- Perlis
  - Recipient of Tuanku Syed Sirajuddin Jamalullail Silver Jubilee Medal (2025)
- Sabah
  - Grand Commander of the Order of Kinabalu (SPDK) – Datuk Seri Panglima (2011)
- Sarawak
  - Grand Principal of the Order of the Star of Hornbill Sarawak (DP) – Datuk Patinggi (2016)
  - Grand Commander of the Order of the Star of Sarawak (PNBS) – Dato Sri (2013)

== See also ==
- Bagan Datok (federal constituency)
- List of people who have served in both Houses of the Malaysian Parliament

Parliament of Malaysia
| Preceded by Mohamed Jamrah | Member of the Dewan Rakyat for Bagan Datuk; 1995 - Present | Succeeded by Incumbent |
Political offices
| Preceded by Abdullah Md Zin | Deputy Minister of Tourism; 27 March 2004 - 14 February 2006 | Succeeded by Nor Mohamed Yakcop |
| Preceded by Abdullah Md Zin | Minister in the Prime Minister's Department; 19 March 2018 - 9 April 2009 | Succeeded by Nor Mohamed Yakcop |
| Preceded by Abdullah Ahmad Badawi | Minister of Defence; 10 April 2009 - 15 May 2013 | Succeeded by Hishammuddin Hussein |
| Preceded by Hishammuddin Hussein | Ministry of Home Affairs; 10 April 2009 - 15 May 2013 | Succeeded by Muhyiddin Yassin |
| Preceded by Muhyiddin Yassin | Deputy Prime Minister of Malaysia; 29 July 2015– 9 May 2018 | Succeeded by Ismail Sabri Yaakob |
| Preceded by Wan Azizah Wan Ismail | Leader of the Opposition; 18 July 2018– 12 March 2019 | Succeeded by Ismail Sabri Yaakob |
| Preceded by Ismail Sabri Yaakob | Deputy Prime Minister of Malaysia; 3 December 2022 - Present; Serving with Fadillah Yusof | Succeeded by Incumbent |
Party political offices
| Preceded by Najib Razak | 8th President of the United Malays National Organisation; 30 June 2018 - Present | Vacant Title next held by Incumbent |
| Preceded by Najib Razak | 6th Chairman of the Barisan Nasional; 30 June 2018 - Present | Vacant Title next held by Incumbent |
