= Kelantan rebellion =

1915 conflict

- Part of the Asian and Pacific theater (World War I)
| Date | 29 April 1915 – 24 May 1915 |
| Location | Pasir Puteh, Kelantan, British Malaya |
| Result | British victory |

Belligerents
| (United Kingdom of Great Britain and Ireland) British Empire; (United Kingdom of Great Britain and Ireland) British Malaya; Kelantan protectorate | (Kelantan) Kelantanese rebels Supported by: Ottoman Empire |

Commanders and leaders
| (United Kingdom of Great Britain and Ireland) Sir Arthur Henderson Young (Kelantan) Sultan Muhammad IV | Tok Janggut †; Tengku Besar Tuan Ahmad |

Strength
| (United Kingdom of Great Britain and Ireland) 150 | 2,500 |

Casualties and losses
| Few | Several hundreds |

The Kelantan Rebellion, also known as the Tok Janggut Uprising, was an anti-colonial uprising in 1915 in the British Protectorate of Kelantan in northeastern Malay Peninsula, now a state of Malaysia.

The outbreak of the Kelantan Rebellion in 1915 has attracted much attention from scholars but there was much disagreement over what actually was the cause of the rebellion. It remains an area of Malaysian history that is still debated amongst scholars, regardless of where scholars have studied the rebellion through the British colonial perspective or that of the locals. Both versions present very different interpretations of the motivations behind the rebellion. However, what is agreed upon by both sides was that the rebellion was centered on a venerable-looking bearded gentleman - Haji Mohd Hassan bin Munas, nom de guerre Tok Janggut (Old Long Beard).

== Background ==
After the Anglo-Siamese Treaty of 1909, Britain took over the jurisdiction of Kelantan from Siam without the consultation of the Sultan. The change in administration saw significant changes in the state's political system, and foreign relations was handled by Britain from 1910.

The local government of Pasir Puteh in Kelantan was taken over by British administrators. British officer Encik Abdul Latiff took over the administration of Kelantan from the local leader, Engku Jeram. Latiff was viewed as an outsider by the Kelantan locals, both for his subservience to the British colonial administration and for the fact that, although Malay, he was not from Kelantan, which has a culture and dialect distinct from other Malay areas of Southeast Asia. Furthermore, anecdotal evidence suggests that Latif perhaps considered himself above the largely rural Kelantanese and was notably stern in his tax collection duties.

=== Administration of Kelantan (1902 - 1915) ===
Earlier, while still a Siamese province, the Anglo-Siamese Treaty of 1902 allowed British officers W.A. Graham and H.W. Thomson to assist in the administration of Kelantan. Significantly, the British administration was able to bring under its control, 1,904 square miles of mineral-rich land previously leased by the Sultan of Kelantan to British entrepreneur R.W. Duff.

Graham soon began modernising the state administration. While reaffirming the status of the Sultan, he restructured the civil service and created several new departments, including the State Treasury. The State Treasury oversaw all payments and receipts collected for the administration. Graham also transformed the existing police force into a more efficient force. A Western-style judiciary was established and operated in parallel with the Islamic courts. Kelantan was also reorganised into three districts - Kota Bharu, Ulu Kelantan and Pasir Puteh to streamline the state's administration. Each district will have its own magistrate, land officer as well as revenue collector.

These changes eventually eroded the power and privileges of the traditional leaders; previously, collection of tax revenue was done exclusively by the Sultan, his family or the nobility, but with Graham's reforms, the Sultan would have to be satisfied with what the British allocated to him.

Anticipating discontent, Graham appointed several members of the royal family to lead several government departments. This arrangement continued until 1909 when Kelantan formally became a British protectorate, taking over from Siam upon signing of the Anglo-Siamese treaty that year.

Graham's successor, J.S Mason continued with new developments in Kelantan's administration. Among these changes was that Britain would oversee Kelantan's foreign relations and defence, and the Sultan would appoint a British Adviser and to follow and give effect to the advice of the Adviser....in all matters of administration other than those touching the Mohammedan religion and Malay customs.

==== Regional administration ====
Graham's reforms provided for district officers to oversee the district and village chiefs. In the past, these district and village chiefs were directly responsible for tax collection; under British administration, tax collection was now the responsibility of the State Treasury functioning via the District Officers.

In land administration, Graham had devised a system that categorized land parcels throughout the state into royal grants and ordinary parcels traded between consenting parties. His successors, Mason and J.E. Bishop continued with the system, albeit transferring legal disputes involving land from the civil courts to the Land Office.

When W. Langham-Carter assumed the position of Adviser, he introduced a land register which included the names of all land owners in Kelantan. This was meant improve collection of property taxes, and to encourage the peasants to cultivate rice and cash crops on the land. In 1915, a new taxation system was introduced; land parcels were categorised into four classes, with different tax rates levied for each class. This mean that all land owners were subject to property tax regardless if the land was being developed or not. The new tax rates came into force on 1 January that year.

==== Political conspiracy ====
Scholars have also pointed out that there was much intrigue within the Kelantan palace.

Prince Long Senik succeeded his uncle, Sultan Mansur, in June 1899, and assumed the title of Sultan Muhammad IV, after the latter's death, but his ascension was not welcomed by other members of the royal family. Among them would be Prince Long Senik's other uncle, Prince Long Jaafar, who was bypassed for the position, as well as Tungku Chik Penambang who was overlooked for the position of Raja Muda – the next in the line of succession. The new Sultan was rendered as a figurehead, as his relatives were allowed to veto his orders and amassed large tracts of land. The grudge against the Sultan by the other princes was evidently apparent to W.A. Graham, who mentioned that "Seven of the most powerful of his uncles and other relatives formed a league by the strength of which combination, they extracted from him privileges to which, without such cohesion, they could never have aspired".

== Course of the rebellion ==
The deposed local administrator, Engku Besar Jeram, called upon Tok Janggut, Haji Said, Che Sahak Merbol and Penghulu Adam to discuss the tense situation in Kelantan. At the meeting, a pact was signed by the participants which prohibited any one of them to co-operate with the British. Their independence fight gained support from most Kelantan residents, whose refusal to pay taxes meant the revenue of the district dropped by half in one year.

In 1915, Latiff discovered that Janggut was responsible, and sent Sergeant Sulaiman and six other policemen to arrest him. The officers found him surrounded by 2,000 of his followers, many of whom were carrying weapons. Tok Janggut did not try and escape: he stood his ground and refused to go with the officers. In the heat of the argument, Janggut stabbed Seargeant Sulaiman with his keris. Sulaiman shortly died, and the crowd disarmed the other officers, who were sent back to Latif.

Encik Latif attempted to rally the surrounding villages against Janggut, but this failed because Tok Janggut was now marching towards Pasir Puteh with his followers. Latif fled Pasir Puteh to avoid Janggut, and to seek an audience with the Sultan of Kelantan in Kota Bharu. Tok Janggut's forces fought against the British in Pasir Puteh, and the rebels triumphed. They remained in Pasir Puteh for three days and declared the independence of Pasir Puteh from British rule. Engku Besar was selected as Sultan of Pasir Puteh, with Tok Janggut as his chief minister. Having heard about Janggut's rebellion from Encik Latif, the Sultan branded Janggut a traitor and called a meeting with the state officials. The rebel leaders were ordered to surrender themselves within seven days, failing which they would be arrested and sentenced to death. They refused to surrender, and a $500 reward was offered to anyone who arrested Engku Besar, Tok Janggut, Haji Said, Haji Ishak or Penghulu Adam.

In May 1915, 1,500 British troops marched to Pasir Puteh to attempt to quell the rebellion. Tok Janggut got wind of this, however, and advised his followers to flee. He and the other rebel leaders hid in the jungle, avoiding the troops. The soldiers returned to Singapore on 17 May, having failed in their mission. After the British troops withdrew, Tok Janggut came out of hiding. News of this reached the authorities in Kota Bharu, who decided to send Indian troops led by British officers in a second attempt at ending the rebellion. The rebel leaders went into hiding again, and out of anger the troops burnt down Jeram town, including the houses of Tok Janggut and many of his followers. Tok Janggut marched on Pasir Puteh town (where the Indian troops had gone after burning down Jeram) on 25 June 1915, with 1,000 of his followers, armed with guns and traditional weaponry. Even though the rebel forces outnumbered their enemy, the Indian troops were much better-equipped. Many of Tok Janggut's followers fled, and he himself was killed, ending the rebellion against British rule in Kelantan.

== Interpretations ==
The Kelantan Rebellion had been portrayed in a wide array because many scholars have disagreed as to what really caused the outbreak of the uprising. The rebellion had been seen and interpreted as;

1. A Jihad (Holy War) against Britain following the outbreak of World War One the previous year. In this war, Britain was part of the Triple Entente (An alliance consisting of Britain, France and Russia) who were fighting against the Triple Alliance (Consisting of Germany, Austria-Hungary and the Ottoman Empire). The Ottoman Empire was an Islamic nation and had called upon all Muslims to support its efforts against the British, French and Russians. This interpretation is the official one in Malaysia, with school textbooks publishing this assessment of the reason for the Kelantan uprising.
2. A peasant rebellion triggered by discontent against the new property tax rates, and the harsh methods used by the District Officer to collect these taxes
3. As a protest / rebellion against the Sultan for accepting British administration and an attempt to oust him from power.
4. As a political manoeuvre by the Sultan to strengthen his position and oust those against him.

=== The Rebellion as a Jihad (Holy War) ===
In this interpretation of the rebellion, much of the works done centred on Tok Janggut's biography and life experiences, and how it shaped his worldview to rebel against the British as part of a Jihad. Although there have been scant historical evidence which detailed Tok Janggut's early life, the romanticised image of Tok Janggut as an Islamic warrior still remained strong in the Malaysian psyche. Much of the interpretation stems from folk tales which depict him as a freedom fighter who would resist even the Sultan for fighting for what he believed was a just cause and that he was considered to be "a man of some learning and consequent repute in an unlettered community". His years of sojourn in Mecca implies that he was a religious man; that point was used by later generations of historians to portray him as an Islamic militant who waged jihad, despite there being no historical evidence to show that his rebellion was done in the name of Islam. Nevertheless, the political context in which the rebellion took place did offer a point of argument why some historians portrayed the rebellion as an Islamic struggle.

In 1915, Britain was involved in the First World War and reduced its focus on its overseas possessions. Scholars have also pointed out that the British were also facing problems from within its own ranks, where Muslim soldiers from the British Indian Army were unhappy at rumours that they would be deployed to the Middle East to fight their Muslim brethren in the Ottoman army. This discontent did lead to the Singapore Mutiny (also known as the Sepoy Mutiny) which lasted from January until March 1915, before the British were able to restore order and had the mutineers executed. Nevertheless, this mutiny was a signal to rebel leaders in Kelantan that the tide of the war was turning against the British, and that they would not be able to deploy reinforcements in time to quell their uprising.

Despite the lack of evidence that the rebellion was carried out as a Jihad, many generations of historians have tried fitting him into this image as a righteous Islamic warrior. For example, in Yahya Abdullah's 1955 book, Peperangan Tok Janggut, atau Balasan Derhaka Tok Janggut was portrayed as a handsome, well-groomed man, with a white pointed beard and turban on his head. Similarly, in Rubaidin Siwar's Pemberontakan Pantai Timor (1980), Tok Janggut was again portrayed with a turban, a long beard and a newly added long robe which makes him appear to look like an Islamic radical, consistent with the context of the time whereby there was a rise in international radical Islamic movements.

The sustainability of this romanticised portrayal of Tok Janggut had much to do with much of the information and pictures not being made publicly known, which places an aura of mystery and intrigue over the entire rebellion. However, by allowing the romance of Tok Janggut to remain, it keeps emphasising ideals and fantasies at the expense of reality. One such popular belief was that Tok Janggut was invincible and skilled at Silat (Malay martial arts). As anthropologist James Boon analysed the term "romance", he points out that;

"Romance portrays vulnerable, disguised protagonists, partial social misfits who sense surpassing ideals and must prove the ultimate feasibility of actualising those ideals often against magical odds.....Romance properly concerns champions rather than heroes.....they are surrounded by signs and tokens of semi-miraculous birth, prone to mythical insights, and are acquainted with the natural and rustic orders more intimately than their privileged aristocratic counterparts."

Despite the lack of evidence suggesting a political Islamic awakening behind the rebellion, some scholars have engaged in inserting present-day concerns into historical interpretations, thus portraying a romanticised image of Tok Janggut which would cause "prejudices and preconceptions to slip in unnoticed and skew our reading of the evidence".

=== Unhappiness stemming from the new land tax ===
Langham-Carter had initiated a new system of land tax whereby all land owners were to pay land-rent whether the land was being cultivated or not. Failure to pay their taxes on time would result in further penalties, usually a fine and are forbidden from using the plot of land for their cultivation for the next year. This policy was greeted with unhappiness amongst the large landowners especially members of the royal family who felt that such taxation laws would hinder their desire to gain more land under their own control. Under this policy, even the Sultan was not exempted from paying the land tax when Langham-Carter insisted that the Sultan had to pay $1800 a year for a 3000-acre plot of land.

Before the land tax was initiated, farmers in Kelantan were paying their taxes based on what they produced (Produce tax). When Langham-Carter implemented the land tax, it was meant to actually replace the Produce tax but this was not properly explained to the people in Kelantan. Now, the peasants saw the land tax as an addition to the tax they were already paying for their produce hence increasing their financial burden and frustration towards the British authorities. Apart from their financial frustration, they were also unhappy that the District Officer responsible for the collection of taxes was not appointed from amongst the locals but instead was appointed from outside Kelantan.

This aversion to be accountable to someone not from the area was already seen during the time of W.A. Graham when in 1905, appointed Encik Ibrahim as District Officer for Pasir Puteh. Encik Ibrahim was from Singapore and the district officer overseeing the tax collection in 1915 was Che Abdul Latif, also from Singapore. This suspicion of outsiders was further aggravated especially since the district officer, who was usually understaffed, took a long time to collect the taxes from the peasants. The peasants were subjected to long queues before they were able to pay their dues. Matters were also not made more conducive especially when the officials were often high handed towards the peasants when collecting the taxes. Such actions only served to create mistrust and suspicion among the peasants towards the British authorities who were not more understanding of the struggle of the peasants.

Their frustration was further heightened in 1915 when most of the peasant's land yielded a poor harvest but were not exempted from paying their land tax. On top of that, the long queues at the District Officer's headquarters meant that some of the peasants were in the queue for three consecutive days. Among those in the queue were Tok Janggut and a few of his followers who, after getting tired of waiting, simply left the area. For this act, the district officer, Che Abdul Latif would dispatch Sergeant Che Wan to arrest Tok Janggut for his alleged refusal to pay his taxes. Tok Janggut, along with other influential local leaders would instigate the peasants to rebel against the land tax which was deemed to be too punitive onto the peasants. Sergeant Che Wan would eventually be stabbed to death after a heated argument with Tok Janggut and this would then officially start the Kelantan Rebellion in 1915.

The peasant rebellion in Pasir Putih mainly highlighted the point that the peasants were unhappy at having to change their traditional way of life, including the way in which their taxes were being accounted and collected. They had felt that the newly implemented British laws had burdened and made their lives more difficult than it used to be. On another note, the British tax laws had also neglected to address Islamic law with regards to land ownership and tax. The Islamic law in question was based on the principal of effort or Ihya rather than land. This principle differed greatly from the British model of taxation and when complaints to the British authorities went unheeded, the peasants joined in the rebellion led by Tok Janggut as a platform to express their discontent at the British policies.

=== A rebellion against the Sultan and an attempt to oust him from power ===
The reluctance of local, principally Malay Muslim, scholars to examine the anti-feudalist nature of Tok Janggut's rebellion can be attributed to the sacrosanct image that the Malay rulers enjoyed until Malaysia's landmark 1993 constitutional amendment that removed their immunity from criminal charges. Under this section, the rebellion was carried out by Tok Janggut as part of an anti-royalty or lese-majeste action. According to this interpretation, the rebellion was seen to be a criticism of the Kelantan Sultan relationship with his people as well as the role and conduct during the rebellion. Although this interpretation is not found within the official Malay and British narrative, it does provide an interesting account over why the rebellion took place. Tok Janggut was a commoner, glorified by the people as he resisted the British government in the cause of social justice and political freedom, defying the Sultan's authority because of the latter's support of British policies as well as his own quest for personal revenge against the Sultan. This story is presented mainly as a form of conflict between tradition and modernity, and between resistance and authority. It can also be interpreted as a subtle critique of the Malay feudal leaders and the values that they uphold.

Tok Janggut defied feudal authority, just like his father, Monas had before him. Monas had two sons, Mat Tahir and Mat Hassan (Tok Janggut). Mat Tahir was killed by a retainer of the Sultan. When Monas tried to appeal to his master, Tungku Seri Maharaja Tua for justice to be served, his pleas were largely ignored. Monas became angry and sought to ruin his master's life. He took his master's favourite concubine, Wan Serang Bulan against her will and when this information reached his master's ears, he had Monas executed. Monas was killed just as he was bending down to scoop water to wash his face before prayers. His executioner, Pak Sulung Bulat had thrust a spear into the neck of Panglima Monas.

This execution occurred just before Mat Hassan returned from Mecca where he had left to seek religious knowledge and to perform his pilgrimage, which was one of the five obligations of Islam. He was a man who was always willing to assist anyone in hardship, regardless of race. He also hated any oppressor and would take actions to ensure that people who oppress others were punished. Hence, when the opportunity to seek revenge for his father's death presented itself, Tok Janggut would use the opportunity to galvanise the peasants to rebel against the British authorities. When the Sultan tried to negotiate with the rebels by sending two of his ministers, they defied his authority. This would then prompt the Sultan to declare the rebels as penderhaka (treasonable behaviour) and to seek British assistance to quell the rebellion. The actions of the Sultan would corroborate J. de V. Allen's study which states that several members of the royal family, especially the uncles were collaborating with Ungku Besar, the Pasir Putih chief in a bid to oust him. Allen pointed out that by the Sultan seeking the British help; it showed that his authority within the royal circles was not strong that he had to seek British assistance to defend his position on the throne.

=== The Sultan's "Double Game" ===
The Sultan is traditionally viewed as a willing partner in adapting to the changes in administration in Kelantan who would administer the state on the advice of the British Adviser. Most scholars had stayed away from examining the role that the Sultan played due to the lese-majeste law in which the Sultan and others of the royal family could not be criminally charged under the Malaysian constitution. Thus, any charge against the Sultan was brushed aside and kept away from public knowledge. After the rebellion broke out, W. Langham-Carter had accused the Sultan of playing a "double-game"- a charge that was levelled against the Sultan after the British authorities had absolved him from any blame in the rebellion. Nevertheless, newly available British colonial records have shown that unlike the cooperative pro-British individual, the Sultan was in fact sympathetic towards the rebels and was able to manipulate events to oust Langham-Carter from his position as British Adviser.

Prior to the outbreak of the rebellion, it was officially recognised that the Sultan and Langham-Carter had some disagreements over several issues. The major disagreement was with regards to the conduct of the District Officer Che Abdul Latif. The Sultan had sent a series of petitions, showing his displeasure at Abdul Latif's temperament and treatment of the local population. Langham-Carter, sided with Abdul Latif and disagreed with the Sultan's assessment and pointed out that Abdul Latif's actions were in line with his enforcing of the British land laws at the time. The Sultan had also petitioned on three occasions to the Governor to have Langham-Carter replaced which showed just how fractured their relationship were. A sore point mentioned by the Sultan was that Langham-Carter had an inadequate grasp of Malay and of Malay customs.

When the rebellion broke out, disagreements broke out between Langham-Carter and the Sultan over how they should manage the situation. The Sultan had wanted to use his own local forces and resolve the matter through negotiations. Langham-Carter, on the other hand had wanted a quick and decisive military victory and hence summoned for military assistance from Singapore. The Sultan was accused by Langham-Carter and other British officials as minimising the seriousness of the rebellion because prior to the arrival of British reinforcements, it was agreed that the Sultan would use his own officials and armed levies to meet the rebels and would hand complete control over to the British once their reinforcements arrived. This was something that the Sultan kept trying to prevent over the next few days.

A few other incidents raised the British suspicions that the Sultan himself was involved in the rebellion. Firstly, despite the increased tensions which saw the Sultan intensify security around the palace, he was not agreeable to the rebels offer to stand down in return for a royal pardon, something that the British saw as the Sultan minimising the seriousness of the threat. Secondly, when the Sultan's minister Dato Setia returned from his negotiation with the rebels, he gave much information regarding the numbers, dispositions as well as the rebel plans which the British suspected as being concocted to prevent action by the British troops. Furthermore, the British troops encountered delaying tactics by the local population to make their passage as difficult as they could. Nevertheless, the Sultan was unable to obstruct the British force, which eventually arrived to deal with the rebels. The Sultan eventually issued draconian proclamations against the rebels and when the uprising was eventually brought back to order, the Sultan issued another proclamation that saw the residents of Pasir Putih having to pay a fine within 15 days or risked having their house burned to the ground.

It was interesting to note that the Sultan was able to portray himself as being accommodating towards the British officials by issuing punitive fines to show his support towards the British and yet at the same time project suspicious behaviour which saw the British seeing the Sultan as being in cahoots with the rebels themselves. This delicate balancing act by the Sultan ensured that the British could never implicate him as a recalcitrant ruler. Overall, compromise, accommodation and opposition had been the changing strategies of the Sultan in his political game with Langham-Carter and other British officials. But what seems to have contributed to his eventual triumph was probably the Sultan's correct reading of the minds of his British antagonists. He would eventually get his request accepted in seeing Langham-Carter removed from his position and replaced by R.J. Farrer, a man the Sultan had requested as the British Adviser in his initial request to the Governor.
