= Kamarudin Md Nor =

Malaysian politician

Yang Berhormat Datuk Kamarudin Md Nor DMSM MLA
- قمر الدين مد نور

Member of the Kelantan State Executive Council (Tourism, Culture, Arts & Heritage)
- In office 15 August 2023 – 9 November 2026
- Monarch: Muhammad V
- Menteri Besar: Mohd Nassuruddin Daud
- Deputy: Zameri Mat Nawang
- Preceded by: Md Anizam Ab Rahman
- Succeeded by: TBA
- Constituency: Ayer Lanas

1st Information Chief of the Malaysian United Indigenous Party
- In office 7 September 2016 – 27 September 2018
- President: Muhyiddin Yassin
- Chairman: Mahathir Mohamad
- Preceded by: Position established
- Succeeded by: Radzi Jidin

Member of the Kelantan State Legislative Assembly for Ayer Lanas
- Incumbent
- Assumed office 12 August 2023
- Preceded by: Mustapa Mohamed (BN–UMNO)
- Majority: 5,009 (2023)

Member of the Kelantan State Legislative Assembly for Semerak
- In office 21 March 2004 – 8 March 2008
- Preceded by: Hussin Awang (PAS)
- Succeeded by: Wan Hassan Wan Ibrahim (PAS)
- Majority: 699 (2004)
- In office 1997 – 29 November 1999
- Preceded by: Sulaiman Ahmad (PAS)
- Succeeded by: Hussin Awang (PAS)
- Majority: (1997)

Personal details
- Born: Kamarudin bin Md Nor Malaysia
- Party: United Malays National Organisation (UMNO) (–2016); Malaysian United Indigenous Party (BERSATU) (since 2016)
- Other political affiliations: Barisan Nasional (BN) (–2016); Pakatan Harapan (PH) (2017–2020); Perikatan Nasional (PN) (since 2020)
- Occupation: Politician

Kamarudin bin Md Nor is a Malaysian politician. He served as a Member of the Kelantan State Executive Council (EXCO) in the state administration under Mohd Nassuruddin Daud from August 2023 to November 2026. He is also a Member of the Kelantan State Legislative Assembly (MLA) for Ayer Lanas, having held that position since August 2023.

He is a member and State Chairman of Kelantan of the Malaysian United Indigenous Party (BERSATU), a component party of Perikatan Nasional (PN). Previously, he was a member of the United Malays National Organisation (UMNO), a component party of the Barisan Nasional (BN) coalition. He served as the MLA for Semerak from 1997 to November 1999 and again from March 2004 to March 2008. He was also the inaugaral Information Chief of BERSATU from September 2016 to September 2018.

Kamarudin Md Nor left UMNO in 2016 and joined the BERSATU. In the 2018 Malaysian general election, he contested in the Pasir Puteh Parliamentary seat but lost to the PAS candidate. He won the Air Lanas state seat during the 2023 Kelantan state election.

== Election results ==
Kelantan State Legislative Assembly
Year	Constituency	Candidate	Votes	Pct	Opponent(s)	Votes	Pct	Ballots cast	Majority	Turnout
1997	N30 Semerak	Kamarudin Md Nor (UMNO)								
2004	N31 Semerak	Kamarudin Md Nor (UMNO)	6,095	53.04%	Hussin Awang (PAS)	5,396	46.96%	11,672	699	83.41%
2008	N31 Semerak	Kamarudin Md Nor (UMNO)	6,112	46.82%	Wan Hassan Wan Ibrahim (PAS)	6,943	53.18%	13,245	831	84.99%
2023	N37 Ayer Lanas	Kamarudin Md Nor (BERSATU)	9,535	67.81%	Nasrul Hadi Kamarulzaman (UMNO)	4,526	32.19%	14,209	5,009	63.24%

Parliament of Malaysia
Year	Constituency	Candidate	Votes	Pct	Opponent(s)	Votes	Pct	Ballots cast	Majority	Turnout
2018	P028 Pasir Puteh	Kamarudin Md Nor (BERSATU)	4,896	7.18%	Nik Muhammad Zawawi Salleh (PAS)	32,307	47.41%	69,745	1,360	81.66%
2018	P028 Pasir Puteh	Kamarudin Md Nor (BERSATU)	4,896	7.18%	Asyraf Wajdi Dusuki (UMNO)	30,947	45.41%	69,745	1,360	81.66%

== Honours ==
- Malacca
  - Companion Class I of the Exalted Order of Malacca (DMSM) – Datuk (2007)
