= Kuala Besut (state constituency) =

Political subdivision in Malaysia

Kuala Besut (N01)
Terengganu constituency

State constituency
- Legislature: Terengganu State Legislative Assembly
MLA
Azmi Salleh
PN
- Constituency created: 1959
- First contested: 1959
- Last contested: 2023

Demographics
- Electors (2023): 26,992

N01 Kuala Besut within Terengganu, as used for the 2023 state election

Kuala Besut is a state constituency in Terengganu, Malaysia, that has been represented in the Terengganu State Legislative Assembly.

The state constituency was first contested in 1959 and is mandated to return a single Assemblyman to the Terengganu State Legislative Assembly under the first-past-the-post voting system.

== Demographics ==
Ethnic breakdown of Kuala Besut's electorate as of 2018
1. Malay (98.8%)
2. Chinese (0.65%)
3. Other ethnicities (0.44%)
4. Indian (0.10%)

== History ==
=== Polling districts ===
According to the Gazette issued on 30 March 2018, the Kuala Besut constituency has a total of 9 polling districts.

| State Constituency | Polling Districts | Code | Location |
|---|---|---|---|
| Kuala Besut (N01) | Pulau Perhentian | 03/01/01 | SK Pulau Perhentian |
| Kuala Besut (N01) | Seberang Berat | 033/01/02 | SK Kuala Besut |
| Kuala Besut (N01) | Nail | 033/01/03 | SK Kampung Nail |
| Kuala Besut (N01) | Seberang Barat Luar | 033/01/04 | SMK Kuala Besut |
| Kuala Besut (N01) | Tok Saboh | 033/01/05 | SK Alor Peroi |
| Kuala Besut (N01) | Kampung Nangka | 033/01/06 | SK Kampung Nangka |
| Kuala Besut (N01) | Kampung Baru | 033/01/07 | SMK Seri Bukit Puteri |
| Kuala Besut (N01) | Bukit Puteri | 033/01/08 | SK Bukit Puteri |
| Kuala Besut (N01) | Air Terjun | 033/01/09 | SK Ayer Terjun |

=== Representation history ===
Members of the Legislative Assembly for Kuala Besut
| Assembly | No | Years | Member | Party |
Constituency created
| 1st | N01 | 1959–1964 | Wan Said Mohamed Nor | PMIP |
| 2nd | N01 | 1964–1969 | Zakariah Muda | BN (UMNO) |
| | | 1969–1971 | Assembly dissolved | |
| 3rd | N01 | 1971–1974 | Mohamad Said | PAS |
| 4th | N01 | 1974–1978 | Hussin Jusoh | BN (PAS) |
| 5th | N01 | 1978–1979 | Zakariah Muda | BN (UMNO) |
| 5th | N01 | 1979–1982 | Wan Zakaria Wan Abd. Rahman | BN (UMNO) |
| 6th | N01 | 1982–1986 | Wan Zakaria Wan Abd. Rahman | BN (UMNO) |
| 7th | N01 | 1986–1990 | Wan Zakaria Wan Abd. Rahman | BN (UMNO) |
| 8th | N01 | 1990–1995 | Wan Zakaria Wan Abd. Rahman | BN (UMNO) |
| 9th | N01 | 1995–1999 | Wan Zakaria Wan Abd. Rahman | BN (UMNO) |
| 10th | N01 | 1999–2004 | Nik Muhammad Zawawi Salleh | PAS |
| 11th | N01 | 2004–2008 | Abdullah Che Muda | BN (UMNO) |
| 12th | N01 | 2008–2013 | Abdul Rahman Mokhtar | BN (UMNO) |
| 13th | N01 | 2013 | Abdul Rahman Mokhtar | BN (UMNO) |
| 13th | N01 | 2013–2018 | Tengku Zaihan Che Ku Abd Rahman | BN (UMNO) |
| 14th | N01 | 2018–2023 | Tengku Zaihan Che Ku Abd Rahman | BN (UMNO) |
| 15th | N01 | 2023–present | Azbi Salleh | PN (PAS) |

== Election results ==
Terengganu state election, 2023
| Party | Candidate | Votes | % | ∆% |
|---|---|---|---|---|
| PAS | Azbi Salleh | 11,496 | 60.91 | ▲14.61 |
| BN | Tengku Zaihan Che Ku Abd Rahman | 7,377 | 39.09 | ▼8.14 |
| Total valid votes | | 18,873 | 100.00 | |
| Total rejected ballots | | 172 | | |
| Unreturned ballots | | 13 | | |
| Turnout | | 19,058 | 70.68 | ▼13.63 |
| Registered electors | | 26,992 | | |
| Majority | | 4,119 | 21.84 | ▲21.01 |
| PAS hold | | Swing | | |

Terengganu state election, 2018
| Party | Candidate | Votes | % | ∆% |
|---|---|---|---|---|
| BN | Tengku Zaihan | 8,126 | 47.23 | ▼10.75 |
| PAS | Azbi Salleh | 7,983 | 46.40 | ▲4.42 |
| PKR | Che Ku Hashim | 1,095 | 6.36 | ▲6.36 |
| Total valid votes | | 17,204 | 100.00 | |
| Total rejected ballots | | 197 | | |
| Unreturned ballots | | 94 | | |
| Turnout | | 17,495 | 84.31 | ▲4.51 |
| Registered electors | | 20,762 | | |
| Majority | | 143 | 0.83 | ▼15.20 |
| BN hold | | Swing | | |

Terengganu state by-election, 24 July 2013 The by-election was called due to the death of incumbent, Abdul Rahman Mokhtar.
| Party | Candidate | Votes | % | ∆% |
|---|---|---|---|---|
| BN | Tengku Zaihan Che Ku Abdul Rahman | 8,288 | 59.27 | ▲2.06 |
| PAS | Azlan Yusof | 5,696 | 40.73 | ▲2.06 |
| Total valid votes | | 13,984 | 100.00 | |
| Total rejected ballots | | 125 | | |
| Unreturned ballots | | 0 | | |
| Turnout | | 14,109 | 79.79 | ▲4.42 |
| Registered electors | | 17,683 | | |
| Majority | | 2,592 | 18.54 | ▲17.71 |
| BN hold | | Swing | | |
Source(s) "Pilihan Raya Kecil N.01 Kuala Besut". Election Commission of Malaysia. "Federal Government Gazette - Notice of Contested Election - By-election of the State Legislative Assembly of N.01 Kuala Besut for the State of Terengganu [P.U. (B) 290/2013]" (PDF). Attorney General's Chambers of Malaysia. 16 July 2013.

Terengganu state election, 2008
| Party | Candidate | Votes | % | ∆% |
|---|---|---|---|---|
| BN | Abdul Rahman Mokhtar | 7,123 | 61.33 | ▲1.81 |
| PAS | Nik Muhammad Zawawi Salleh | 4,492 | 38.67 | ▼1.81 |
| Total valid votes | | 11,615 | 100.00 | |
| Total rejected ballots | | 140 | | |
| Unreturned ballots | | 385 | | |
| Turnout | | 12,140 | 85.59 | ▼1.99 |
| Registered electors | | 14,180 | | |
| Majority | | 2,631 | 22.66 | ▲6.62 |
| BN hold | | Swing | | |

Terengganu state election, 2004
| Party | Candidate | Votes | % | ∆% |
|---|---|---|---|---|
| BN | Abdullah Che Muda | 6,334 | 59.52 | ▲12.43 |
| PAS | Nik Muhammad Zawawi Salleh | 4,307 | 40.48 | ▼12.43 |
| Total valid votes | | 10,641 | 100.00 | |
| Total rejected ballots | | 120 | | |
| Unreturned ballots | | 67 | | |
| Turnout | | 10,828 | 87.77 | ▲4.88 |
| Registered electors | | 12,361 | | |
| Majority | | 2,027 | 19.04 | ▲13.22 |
| BN hold | | Swing | | |

Terengganu state election, 1999
| Party | Candidate | Votes | % | ∆% |
|---|---|---|---|---|
| PAS | Nik Muhammad Zawawi Salleh | 4,426 | 52.91 | ▲7.84 |
| BN | Wan Zakaria Wan Abd. Rahman | 3,939 | 47.09 | ▼7.84 |
| Total valid votes | | 8,365 | 100.00 | |
| Total rejected ballots | | 152 | | |
| Unreturned ballots | | 92 | | |
| Turnout | | 8,609 | 82.89 | ▲0.91 |
| Registered electors | | 10,386 | | |
| Majority | | 487 | 5.82 | ▼3.99 |
| PAS hold | | Swing | | |

Terengganu state election, 1995
| Party | Candidate | Votes | % | ∆% |
|---|---|---|---|---|
| BN | Wan Zakaria Wan Abd. Rahman | 4,536 | 54.88 | ▼2.61 |
| PAS | Che Ku Hashim Che Ku Mat | 3,725 | 45.07 | ▲2.56 |
| Total valid votes | | 8,261 | 100.00 | |
| Total rejected ballots | | 221 | | |
| Unreturned ballots | | 44 | | |
| Turnout | | 8,526 | 81.98 | ▼0.92 |
| Registered electors | | 10,408 | | |
| Majority | | 811 | 9.81 | ▼4.03 |
| BN hold | | Swing | | |

Terengganu state election, 1990
| Party | Candidate | Votes | % | ∆% |
|---|---|---|---|---|
| BN | Wan Zakaria Wan Abd. Rahman | 3,765 | 51.81 | ▲1.57 |
| PAS | Husain Awang | 3,502 | 48.19 | ▲5.38 |
| Total valid votes | | 7,267 | 100.00 | |
| Total rejected ballots | | 185 | | |
| Unreturned ballots | | 0 | | |
| Turnout | | 7,452 | 83.71 | ▼4.99 |
| Registered electors | | 8,902 | | |
| Majority | | 263 | 3.62 | ▼22.43 |
| BN hold | | Swing | | |

Terengganu state election, 1986
| Party | Candidate | Votes | % | ∆% |
|---|---|---|---|---|
| BN | Wan Zakaria Wan Abd. Rahman | 3,698 | 63.05 | ▲5.08 |
| PAS | Abd. Latif Mohamad | 2,170 | 36.97 | ▼4.54 |
| Total valid votes | | 5,868 | 100.00 | |
| Total rejected ballots | | 205 | | |
| Unreturned ballots | | 0 | | |
| Turnout | | 6,073 | 78.64 | ▼4.94 |
| Registered electors | | 7,725 | | |
| Majority | | 1,528 | 26.05 | ▲11.21 |
| BN hold | | Swing | | |

Terengganu state election, 1982
| Party | Candidate | Votes | % | ∆% |
|---|---|---|---|---|
| BN | Wan Zakaria Wan Abd. Rahman | 4,381 | 57.49 | ▼0.06 |
| PAS | Muhammad Jusoh | 3,238 | 42.51 | ▲0.12 |
| Total valid votes | | 7,619 | 100.00 | |
| Total rejected ballots | | 166 | | |
| Unreturned ballots | | 0 | | |
| Turnout | | 7,785 | 82.71 | ▲2.51 |
| Registered electors | | 9,402 | | |
| Majority | | 1,143 | 15.01 | ▼0.17 |
| BN hold | | Swing | | |

Terengganu state election, 1978
| Party | Candidate | Votes | % | ∆% |
|---|---|---|---|---|
| BN | Zakaria Muda | 3,387 | 57.55 | ▼0.38 |
| PAS | Husin Jusoh | 2,512 | 42.63 | ▼28.23 |
| Total valid votes | | 5,899 | 100.00 | |
| Total rejected ballots | | 283 | | |
| Unreturned ballots | | 0 | | |
| Turnout | | 6,182 | 80.20 | ▼4.20 |
| Registered electors | | 7,713 | | |
| Majority | | 875 | 14.84 | ▲0.34 |
| BN hold | | Swing | | |

Terengganu state election, 1974
| Party | Candidate | Votes | % | ∆% |
|---|---|---|---|---|
| BN | Husin Jusoh | 3,907 | 71.89 | |
| Parti Sosialis Rakyat Malaysia | Wan Ali | 1,529 | 28.14 | |
| Total valid votes | | 5,436 | 100.00 | |
| Total rejected ballots | | 191 | | |
| Unreturned ballots | | 0 | | |
| Turnout | | 5,627 | 76.75 | ▼1.56 |
| Registered electors | | 7,328 | | |
| Majority | | 2,378 | 43.76 | ▲38.76 |
| BN hold | | Swing | | |

Terengganu state election, 1969
| Party | Candidate | Votes | % | ∆% |
|---|---|---|---|---|
| PAS | Mohamad Said | 2,826 | 52.38 | ▲16.00 |
| Alliance | Zakaria Muda | 2,569 | 47.59 | ▼1.60 |
| Total valid votes | | 5,395 | 100.00 | |
| Total rejected ballots | | 355 | | |
| Unreturned ballots | | 0 | | |
| Turnout | | 5,750 | 78.31 | ▼1.68 |
| Registered electors | | 7,341 | | |
| Majority | | 257 | 4.76 | ▼4.88 |
| PAS hold | | Swing | | |

Terengganu state election, 1964
| Party | Candidate | Votes | % | ∆% |
|---|---|---|---|---|
| Alliance | Zakaria Muda | 1,988 | 45.99 | ▲3.60 |
| PAS | Yusof Mat Sah | 1,658 | 38.35 | ▼0.65 |
| Socialist Front | Wan Ali | 645 | 14.93 | ▲14.93 |
| National Party | Che Idris Hassan | 31 | 0.72 | ▲0.72 |
| Total valid votes | | 4,322 | 100.00 | |
| Total rejected ballots | | 295 | | |
| Unreturned ballots | | 0 | | |
| Turnout | | 4,617 | 79.99 | ▲9.88 |
| Registered electors | | 5,771 | | |
| Majority | | 330 | 7.64 | ▲0.23 |
| Alliance hold | | Swing | | |

Terengganu state election, 1959
| Party | Candidate | Votes | % |
|---|---|---|---|
| National Party | Wan Said | 1,303 | 39.42 |
| Socialist Front | Wan Ali | 1,058 | 32.00 |
| Alliance | Abu Bakar | 942 | 28.51 |
| Total valid votes | | 3,303 | 100.00 |
| Total rejected ballots | | 87 | |
| Unreturned ballots | | 0 | |
| Turnout | | 3,390 | 70.11 |
| Registered electors | | 4,835 | |
| Majority | | 245 | 7.41 |
This was a new seats created.
