= List of whips in the Dewan Rakyat =

Whips have managed business and maintained party discipline for Malaysia's federal political parties in the Dewan Rakyat. A party's more senior whip held the title "Chief Whip", while the more junior whip was styled "Deputy Whip".

== Current Chief Whip ==
Party/Coalition	Abbr	Chief Whip
Perikatan Nasional	PN	Takiyuddin Hassan
Malaysian United Indigenous Party	BERSATU	Radzi Jidin
Malaysian Islamic Party	PAS	Nik Muhammad Zawawi Salleh
Barisan Nasional	BN	Ahmad Zahid Hamidi
Gabungan Parti Sarawak	GPS	Fadillah Yusof
Gabungan Rakyat Sabah	GRS	Jonathan Yasin
Pakatan Harapan	PH	Syed Ibrahim Syed Noh
Democratic Action Party	DAP	Nga Kor Ming
People's Justice Party	KEADILAN	Aminuddin Harun
National Trust Party	AMANAH	Dzulkefly Ahmad

== By party ==
=== Barisan Nasional ===
- Abdullah Ahmad Badawi (2000 – 2003)
- Najib Razak (2004 – 2009)
- Muhyiddin Yassin (2009 – 2015)
- Ahmad Zahid Hamidi (2015 – 2018)
- Azalina Othman Said (May 2018 – October 2018)
- Ismail Sabri Yaakob (October 2018 – March 2019)
- Mahdzir Khalid (March 2019 – May 2020)
- Ahmad Zahid Hamidi (May 2020 – current)

=== Democratic Action Party ===
- Tan Seng Giaw ( ? – 2013)
- Anthony Loke Siew Fook (2013 - 2022)
- Nga Kor Ming (2022 - present)

=== People's Justice Party ===
- Mohamed Azmin Ali (2008-2013)
- Johari Abdul (2013-2022)
- Rafizi Ramli (2022 - 2025)
- Aminuddin Harun (2025 - present)

=== Malaysian United Indigenous Party ===
- Mohamed Azmin Ali (2020-2022)
- Radzi Jidin (2022-present)

=== Malaysian Islamic Party ===
- Kamaruddin Jaffar (2004 - 2008)
- Salahuddin Ayub (2008 - 2013)
- Mahfuz Omar (2013 - 2015)
- Takiyuddin Hassan (2015 - 2020)
- Nik Muhammad Zawawi Salleh (2020 - present)

=== Sabah Heritage Party ===
- Rozman Isli (2020)

=== Gabungan Parti Sarawak ===
- Fadillah Yusof (2018 - current)

=== National Trust Party ===
- Hasanuddin Mohd Yunus (2018-2022)
- Dzulkefly Ahmad (2022-present)

=== Gabungan Rakyat Sabah ===
- Jonathan Yassin (2022-present)

== See also ==
- Party whip (Malaysia)
