= Pasir Puteh (federal constituency) =

Federal constituency of Kelantan, Malaysia

Pasir Puteh (P028)
Kelantan constituency
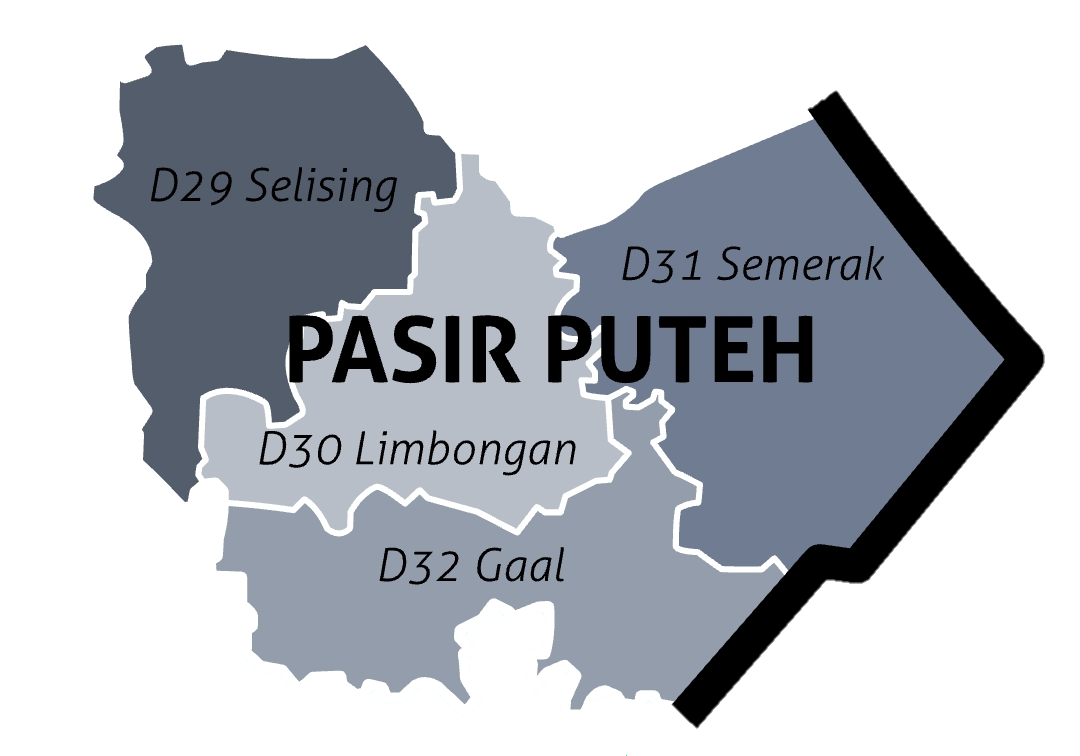

Federal constituency
- Legislature: Dewan Rakyat
- MP: Nik Muhammad Zawawi Salleh; PN
- Constituency created: 1958
- First contested: 1959
- Last contested: 2022

Demographics
- Population (2020): 135,823
- Electors (2023): 113,570
- Area (km²): 423
- Pop. density (per km²): 321.1

Pasir Puteh is a federal constituency in Pasir Puteh District, Kelantan, Malaysia, that has been represented in the Dewan Rakyat since 1959.

The federal constituency was created in the 1958 redistribution and is mandated to return a single member to the Dewan Rakyat under the first past the post voting system.

== Demographics ==
Ethnic breakdown of Pasir Puteh's electorate as of 2022
1. Malay (99.1%)
2. Chinese (0.50%)
3. Other ethnicities (0.30%)
4. Indian (0.10%)

As of 2020, Pasir Puteh has a population of 135,823 people.

Age breakdown of Pasir Puteh's electorate as of 2022
1. 18-20 (7.22%)
2. 21-29 (23.9%)
3. 30-39 (24.1%)
4. 40-49 (17.4%)
5. 50-59 (12.9%)
6. 60-69 (9.57%)
7. 70-79 (3.97%)
8. 80-89 (1.03%)
9. above 90 (0.19%)
Gender breakdown of Pasir Puteh's electorate as of 2022
1. Male (48.6%)
2. Female (51.4%)

== History ==
=== Polling districts ===
According to the federal gazette issued on 18 July 2023, the Pasir Puteh constituency is divided into 48 polling districts.

State constituency	Polling districts	Code	Location
Selising (N29)	Kedai Menanti	028/29/01	SK Tualang Tinggi
Selising (N29)	Danan	028/29/02	SK Danan
Selising (N29)	Bukit Merbau	028/29/03	SK Bukit Merbau
Selising (N29)	Tualang	028/29/04	SK Tasek Pauh
Selising (N29)	Tasik Pauh	028/29/05	SK Tasek Pauh
Selising (N29)	Selising	028/29/06	SK Bukit Jawa
Selising (N29)	Padang Pak Omar	028/29/07	SMK Bukit Jawa
Selising (N29)	Banir Belikong	028/29/08	SK Bukit Abal
Selising (N29)	Bukit Abal	028/29/09	SMK Sri Maharaja
Selising (N29)	Berangan	028/29/10	SK Kampong Berangan
Selising (N29)	Alor Geliong	028/29/11	SK Banggol Pa' Esah
Selising (N29)	Bukit Bidang	028/29/12	SK Bukit Jawa (2)
Selising (N29)	Kampung Seligi	028/29/13	SK Seligi
Limbongan (N30)	Jelor	028/30/01	SK Jelor
Limbongan (N30)	Kampung Nara	028/30/02	SK Kampong Nara
Limbongan (N30)	Kampung Merkang	028/30/03	SK Padang Pa' Amat
Limbongan (N30)	Padang Pak Amat	028/30/04	SM Sains Pasir Puteh
Limbongan (N30)	Panggong	028/30/05	SK Panggong
Limbongan (N30)	Permatang Sungkai	028/30/06	SMU (A) Diniah Permatang Ramabi
Limbongan (N30)	Cherang Tuli	028/30/07	SMK Seri Aman
Limbongan (N30)	Saring	028/30/08	SMU (A) Nurul Ittifaq Nering
Limbongan (N30)	Alor Pasir	028/30/09	SMK Tok Janggut
Limbongan (N30)	Gong Serapat	028/30/10	SK Pasir Puteh
Limbongan (N30)	Bandar Pasir Puteh	028/30/11	SK Pasir Puteh (L)
Limbongan (N30)	Dalam Kemuning	028/30/12	SK Seri Aman
Limbongan (N30)	Kampung Raja	028/30/13	SK Kampong Raja
Semerak (N31)	Tok Bali	028/31/01	SK To'Bali
Semerak (N31)	Kampung Lembah	028/31/02	SK Kg Sepulau
Semerak (N31)	Gong Kulim	028/31/03	SK Kulim
Semerak (N31)	Bukit Tanah	028/31/04	SK Bukit Tanah
Semerak (N31)	Gong Manok	028/31/05	SK Gong Manak
Semerak (N31)	Pekan Cherang Ruku	028/31/06	SK Cherang Raku
Semerak (N31)	Dalam Rhu	028/31/07	SK Dalam Ru
Semerak (N31)	Gong Tapang	028/31/08	SMA Dato' Ismail
Semerak (N31)	Pulau Lima	028/31/09	SMK Sungai Petai
Semerak (N31)	Sungai Petai	028/31/10	SK Sungai Petai
Gaal (N32)	Temila	028/32/01	Maahad Saniah Pasir Puteh
Gaal (N32)	Jeram	028/32/02	SK Jeram
Gaal (N32)	Telipok	028/32/03	SMK Jeram
Gaal (N32)	Telosan	028/32/04	SK Telosan
Gaal (N32)	Gong Garu	028/32/05	SK Gong Garu
Gaal (N32)	Batu Hitam	028/32/06	SK Changgai
Gaal (N32)	Gaal	028/32/07	SMK Gaal
Gaal (N32)	Gong Datuk	028/32/08	SK Gaal
Gaal (N32)	Kandis	028/32/09	SK Kampong Kandis
Gaal (N32)	Bukit Yong	028/32/10	SMU (A) Nurul Huda Bukit Yong
Gaal (N32)	Gong Nangka	028/32/11	SK Wakaf Raja
Gaal (N32)	Bukit Awang	028/32/12	SK Bukit Awang

=== Representation history ===
Members of Parliament for Pasir Puteh
Parliament	No	Years	Member	Party	Vote
Constituency created from Kelantan Timor
Parliament of the Federation of Malaya
1st	P022	1959–1963	Mohamad Asri Muda (محمد عصري مودا)	PMIP	12,284; 64.95%
Parliament of Malaysia
1st	P022	1963–1964	Mohamed Asri Muda (محمد عصري مودا)	PMIP	12,284; 64.95%
2nd	P022	1964–1969	Mohamed Asri Muda (محمد عصري مودا)	PMIP	11,798; 53.17%
		1969–1971	Parliament was suspended		
3rd	P022	1971–1973	Wan Sulaiman Ibrahim (وان سليمان إبراهيم)	PMIP	13,294; 50.50%
3rd	P022	1973–1974	Wan Sulaiman Ibrahim (وان سليمان إبراهيم)	BN (PMIP)	13,294; 50.50%
4th	P025	1974–1978	Wan Sulaiman Ibrahim (وان سليمان إبراهيم)	BN (PAS)	14,342; 69.96%
5th	P025	1978–1982	Wan Mohd. Najib Wan Mohamad (وان محمد نجيب وان محمد)	BN (UMNO)	12,018; 55.64%
6th	P025	1982–1986	Wan Mohd. Najib Wan Mohamad (وان محمد نجيب وان محمد)	BN (UMNO)	14,844; 55.15%
7th	P024	1986–1990	Wan Omar Wan Majid (وان عمر وان مجيد)	BN (UMNO)	13,724; 55.61%
8th	P024	1990–1995	Wan Omar Wan Majid (وان عمر وان مجيد)	S46	17,824; 63.12%
9th	P028	1995–1999	Mohamed Abdullah (محمد عبدالله)	S46	21,837; 54.56%
10th	P028	1999–2004	Alwi Jusoh (علوي جوسوه)	BA (PAS)	25,373; 59.55%
11th	P028	2004	Kalthom Othman (كلثوم عثمان)	PAS	27,018; 53.79%
11th	P028	2004–2008	Che Min Che Ahmad (چئ مين چئ أحمد)	BN (UMNO)	27,018; 53.79%
12th	P028	2008–2013	Muhammad Husain (محمّد حسين)	PR (PAS)	28,365; 53.76%
13th	P028	2013–2018	Nik Mazian Nik Mohamad (نئ مذيان نئ محمد)	PR (PAS)	33,579; 51.45%
14th	P028	2018–2020	Nik Muhammad Zawawi Salleh (نئ محمّد زواوي صالح)	PAS	32,307; 47.41%
14th	P028	2020–2022	Nik Muhammad Zawawi Salleh (نئ محمّد زواوي صالح)	PN (PAS)	32,307; 47.41%
15th	P028	2022–present	Nik Muhammad Zawawi Salleh (نئ محمّد زواوي صالح)	PN (PAS)	53,108; 65.37%

=== State constituency ===
Parliamentary constituency	State constituency						
Parliamentary constituency	1955–1959*	1959–1974	1974–1986	1986–1995	1995–2004	2004–2018	2018–present
Pasir Puteh			Bandar Pasir Puteh				
Pasir Puteh			Cherang Ruku				
Pasir Puteh				Gaal			
Pasir Puteh				Limbongan			
Pasir Puteh		Pasir Puteh Utara					
Pasir Puteh		Pasir Puteh Tengah					
Pasir Puteh		Pasir Puteh Tenggara					
Pasir Puteh			Selising		Selising		
Pasir Puteh					Semerak		

=== Historical boundaries ===
State Constituency	Area					
State Constituency	1959	1974	1984	1994	2003	2018
Bandar Pasir Puteh		Dalam Kemunting; Jeram Pasu; Kampung Merkang; Padang Pak Amat; Wakaf Lanas				
Cherang Raku		Bukit Awang; Gong Kulim; Semerak; Sungai Petai; Tok Bali				
Gaal			Bukit Awang; Gaal; Jeram; Kampung Kandis; Kampung Temila		Bukit Awang; Gaal; Jeram; Kampung Kandis; Kampung Pagar Raja	Bukit Awang; Gaal; Jeram; Kampung Kandis; Kampung Temila
Limbongan			Jelor; Kampung Gong Sopa; Pasir Puteh; Padang Pak Amat; Wakaf Lanas		Jelor; Kampung Temila; Padang Pak Amat; Seligi; Wakaf Lanas	Jelor; Kampung Gong Sopa; Pasir Puteh; Padang Pak Amat; Wakaf Lanas
Pasir Puteh Utara	Bukit Abal; Bukit Jawa; Danan; Kampung Seligi; Kampung Temila					
Pasir Puteh Tengah	Dalam Kemunting; Jeram Pasu; Kampung Gong Kelih; Padang Pak Amat; Wakaf Lanas					
Pasir Puteh Tenggara	Bukit Awang; Gong Kulim; Kampung Tok Kamis; Sungai Petai; Tok Bali					
Selising		Bukit Abal; Bukit Jawa; Danan; Kampung Seligi; Kampung Temila		Bukit Abal; Bukit Jawa; Bukit Merbau; Danan; Kampung Seligi	Bukit Abal; Bukit Jawa; Bukit Merbau; Danan; Selising	Bukit Abal; Bukit Jawa; Bukit Merbau; Danan; Kampung Seligi
Semerak				Cherang Raku; Gong Kulim; Semerak; Sungai Petai; Tok Bali		

=== Current state assembly members ===
No.	State Constituency	Member	Coalition (Party)
N29	Selising	Tuan Mohd Saripuddin Tuan Ismail	PN (PAS)
N30	Limbongan	Nor Asilah Mohamed Zin	PN (PAS)
N31	Semerak	Norsham Sulaiman	PN (PAS)
N32	Gaal	Mohd Rodzi Ja'afar	PN (PAS)

=== Local governments & postcodes ===
No.	State Constituency	Local Government	Postcode
N29	Selinsing	Pasir Puteh District Council	16700 Cherang Raku; 16800, 16810 Pasir Puteh
N30	Limbongan	Pasir Puteh District Council	16700 Cherang Raku; 16800, 16810 Pasir Puteh
N31	Semerak	Pasir Puteh District Council	16700 Cherang Raku; 16800, 16810 Pasir Puteh
N32	Gaal	Pasir Puteh District Council	16700 Cherang Raku; 16800, 16810 Pasir Puteh

== Election results ==
Malaysian general election, 2022
Party	Candidate	Votes	%	∆%
PAS	Nik Muhammad Zawawi Salleh	53,108	65.37	▲17.96
BN	Zawawi Othman	23,988	29.43	▼15.98
PH	Muhammad Husain	3,873	4.77	▲4.77
PEJUANG	Wan Marzudi Wan Umar	350	0.43	▲0.43
Total valid votes		81,319	100.00	
Total rejected ballots		1,020		
Unreturned ballots		237		
Turnout		82,228	73.03	▼8.63
Registered electors		113,070		
Majority		29,120	35.94	▲33.94
PAS hold		Swing		
Source(s) https://lom.agc.gov.my/ilims/upload/portal/akta/outputp/1753266/PUB%20607%20(2022).pdf

Malaysian general election, 2018
Party	Candidate	Votes	%	∆%
PAS	Nik Muhammad Zawawi Salleh	32,307	47.41	▼4.04
BN	Asyraf Wajdi Dusuki	30,947	45.41	▼3.14
PKR	Kamarudin Md Nor	4,896	7.18	▲7.18
Total valid votes		68,150	100.00	
Total rejected ballots		923		
Unreturned ballots		672		
Turnout		69,745	81.66	▼5.19
Registered electors		85,411		
Majority		1,360	2.00	▼0.90
PAS hold		Swing		
Source(s) "His Majesty's Government Gazette - Notice of Contested Election, Parliament for the State of Kelantan [P.U. (B) 234/2018]" (PDF). Attorney General's Chambers of Malaysia. 3 May 2018. "Federal Government Gazette - Results of Contested Election and Statements of the Poll after the Official Addition of Votes, Parliamentary Constituencies for the State of Kelantan [P.U. (B) 308/2018]" (PDF). Attorney General's Chambers of Malaysia. 28 May 2018.

Malaysian general election, 2013
Party	Candidate	Votes	%	∆%
PAS	Nik Mazian Nik Mohamad	33,579	51.45	▼2.31
BN	Tuan Mustaffa Tuan Mat	31,691	48.55	▲2.31
Total valid votes		65,270	100.00	
Total rejected ballots		770		
Unreturned ballots		192		
Turnout		66,232	86.85	▲3.33
Registered electors		76,259		
Majority		1,888	2.90	▼4.62
PAS hold		Swing		
Source(s) "Federal Government Gazette - Notice of Contested Election, Parliament for the State of Kelantan [P.U. (B) 171/2013]" (PDF). Attorney General's Chambers of Malaysia. 26 April 2013. "Federal Government Gazette - Results of Contested Election and Statements of the Poll after the Official Addition of Votes, Parliamentary Constituencies for the State of Kelantan [P.U. (B) 212/2013]" (PDF). Attorney General's Chambers of Malaysia. 22 May 2013. Archived from the original (PDF) on 29 December 2019.

Malaysian general election, 2008
Party	Candidate	Votes	%	∆%
PAS	Muhammad Husin	28,365	53.76	▲7.55
BN	Amran Mat Nor	24,397	46.24	▼7.55
Total valid votes		52,762	100.00	
Total rejected ballots		886		
Unreturned ballots		130		
Turnout		53,778	83.52	▼6.65
Registered electors		64,393		
Majority		3,968	7.52	▼0.06
PAS gain from BN		Swing		?

Malaysian general election, 2004
Party	Candidate	Votes	%	∆%
Initially, the Returning Officer had declared Kalthom Othman as the elected MP for Pasir Puteh at the night of 21 March 2004. However, BN candidate Che Min Che Ahmad filed his petition to nullify the election due to inconsistent figure in the vote counting documents. The Election Court had made such a shocked decision to declare him as the rightful winner in June 2004, 3 months after the 11th General Election. No by-election was held by the Election Commission of Malaysia.
BN	Che Min Che Ahmad	27,018	53.79	▲13.98
PAS	Kalthom Othman	23,208	46.21	▼13.34
Total valid votes		50,226	100.00	
Total rejected ballots		1,184		
Unreturned ballots		266		
Turnout		51,676	90.17	▲13.58
Registered electors		57,309		
Majority		3,810	7.58	▼12.16
BN gain from PAS		Swing		?

Malaysian general election, 1999
Party	Candidate	Votes	%	∆%
PAS	Alwi Jusoh	25,373	59.55	▲59.55
BN	Kamarudin Md. Nor	16,962	39.81	▼5.63
KITA	Hasim Othman	274	0.64	▲0.64
Total valid votes		42,609	100.00	
Total rejected ballots		821		
Unreturned ballots		55		
Turnout		43,485	76.59	▲0.26
Registered electors		56,776		
Majority		8,411	19.74	▲10.62
PAS gain from S46		Swing		?

Malaysian general election, 1995
Party	Candidate	Votes	%	∆%
S46	Mohamed Abdullah	21,837	54.56	▼8.56
BN	Kamarudin Md. Nor	18,185	45.44	▲9.65
Total valid votes		40,022	100.00	
Total rejected ballots		1,177		
Unreturned ballots		130		
Turnout		41,329	76.33	▼4.28
Registered electors		54,145		
Majority		3,652	9.12	▼18.21
S46 hold		Swing		

Malaysian general election, 1990
Party	Candidate	Votes	%	∆%
S46	Wan Omar Wan Majid	17,824	63.12	▲63.12
BN	Kamaruddin Md. Nor	10,104	35.79	▼19.82
Independent	Tengku Sihar Tengku Abdul Kadir	309	1.09	▲1.09
Total valid votes		28,237	100.00	
Total rejected ballots		590		
Unreturned ballots		0		
Turnout		28,827	80.61	▲3.43
Registered electors		35,760		
Majority		7,720	27.33	▲16.11
S46 gain from BN		Swing		?

Malaysian general election, 1986
Party	Candidate	Votes	%	∆%
BN	Wan Omar Wan Majid	13,724	55.61	▲0.46
PAS	Wan Mustaffa Rusydi	10,955	44.39	▲0.83
Total valid votes		24,679	100.00	
Total rejected ballots		669		
Unreturned ballots		0		
Turnout		25,348	77.18	▼3.18
Registered electors		32,842		
Majority		2,769	11.22	▼0.37
BN hold		Swing		

Malaysian general election, 1982
Party	Candidate	Votes	%	∆%
BN	Wan Mohd. Najib Wan Mohamad	14,844	55.15	▼0.49
PAS	Wan Ismail Wan Ibrahim	11,723	43.56	▼0.80
Independent	Mohamad Nor Mohamad	348	1.29	▲1.29
Total valid votes		26,915	100.00	
Total rejected ballots		474		
Unreturned ballots		0		
Turnout		27,389	80.36	▲4.91
Registered electors		34,084		
Majority		3,121	11.59	▲0.31
BN hold		Swing		

Malaysian general election, 1978
Party	Candidate	Votes	%	∆%
BN	Wan Mohd. Najib Wan Mohamad	12,018	55.64	▼14.32
PAS	Yahya Othman	9,580	44.36	▲44.36
Total valid votes		21,598	100.00	
Total rejected ballots		285		
Unreturned ballots		0		
Turnout		21,883	75.45	▲0.00
Registered electors		29,002		
Majority		2,438	11.28	▼28.64
BN hold		Swing		

Malaysian general election, 1974
Party	Candidate	Votes	%	∆%
BN	Wan Sulaiman Ibrahim	14,342	69.96	▲69.96
Independent	Musa Salleh	6,159	30.04	▲30.04
Total valid votes		20,501	100.00	
Total rejected ballots		688		
Unreturned ballots		0		
Turnout		21,189	75.45	▼4.84
Registered electors		28,084		
Majority		8,183	39.92	▲38.92
BN gain from National Trust Party (Malaysia)-Malayan Islamic Party		Swing		?

Malaysian general election, 1969
Party	Candidate	Votes	%	∆%
PMIP	Wan Sulaiman Ibrahim	13,294	50.50	▼2.67
Alliance	Abdullah Mahmood	13,029	49.50	▲2.67
Total valid votes		26,323	100.00	
Total rejected ballots		656		
Unreturned ballots		0		
Turnout		26,979	80.29	▼5.53
Registered electors		33,603		
Majority		265	1.00	▼5.34
PMIP hold		Swing		

Malaysian general election, 1964
Party	Candidate	Votes	%	∆%
PMIP	Mohamad Asri Muda	11,798	53.17	▼11.78
Alliance	Idris Ismail	10,393	46.83	▲11.78
Total valid votes		22,191	100.00	
Total rejected ballots		1,017		
Unreturned ballots		0		
Turnout		23,208	85.82	▲13.53
Registered electors		27,042		
Majority		1,405	6.34	▼23.56
PMIP hold		Swing		

Malayan general election, 1959
Party	Candidate	Votes	%
PMIP	Mohamad Asri Muda	12,284	64.95
Alliance	Idris Ismail	6,630	35.05
Total valid votes		18,914	100.00
Total rejected ballots		117	
Unreturned ballots		0	
Turnout		19,031	72.29
Registered electors		26,326	
Majority		5,654	29.9
This was a new constituency created.
