= 1997 Semerak by-election =

By-election in Malaysia in 1997

← 1995	11 August 1997	1999 →

Semerak seat in the Kelantan State Legislative Assembly
- Turnout: 82.42%
	BN	PAS	AKIM
Candidate	Kamarudin Mohd Nor	Wan Mohd Fauzi Husain	Mohd Din Nizam Din
Party	UMNO	PAS	AKIM
Alliance	BN	PAS	AKIM
Popular vote	5,370	4,592	27
Percentage	53.30%	45.58%	0.02%
MLA before election
Sulaiman Ahmad
Angkatan Perpaduan Ummah (PAS)
Elected MLA
Kamarudin Mohd Nor
BN (UMNO)

The 1997 Semerak by-election was a by-election that was held on 11 August 1997 for the Kelantan State Legislative Assembly seat of Semerak. It was called following the death of its PAS assemblyman Sulaiman Ahmad, aused by stroke. Sulaiman won the seat on 1995 Malaysian general election under Angkatan Perpaduan Ummah banner against Ismail Awang of Barisan Nasional and Musa Salleh of AKIM with a majority of 248.

Kamarudin Mohd Nor of Barisan Nasional wrest the seat against PAS Wan Mohd Fauzi with a majority of 778 votes. Mohd Din of AKIM lost his deposit, after only garnering 27 votes.

== Nomination ==
Barisan Nasional nominated Pasir Puteh UMNO Chairmen, Kamarudin Mohd Nor. On 31st July, PAS nominated local business man, Wan Mohd Fauzi.AKIM nominated its vice president, Mohd Din.

== Timeline ==
The key dates are listed below.

Date	Event
22 July 1997	Issue of the Writ of Election
1 August 1997	Nomination Day
1 August- 10 August 1997	Campaigning Period
9-10 August 1997	Early polling day for postal and overseas voters
11 August 1997	Polling Day

== Results ==
Kelantan state by-election, 11 August 1997: Semerak upon the death of incumbent Sulaiman Ahmad
Party	Candidate	Votes	%	∆%
BN	Kamarudin Mohd Nor	5,370	53.30	
PAS	Wan Mohd Fauzi Husain	4,592	45.58	
KITA	Mohd Din Nizam Din	27	0.2	
Total valid votes		9,989	99.15	
Total rejected ballots		85	0.85	
Unreturned ballots		0		
Turnout		10,074	82.42	
Registered electors		12,222		
Majority		778	7.7	
BN gain from PAS		Swing		?
