= Johor Bahru (federal constituency) =

Federal constituency in Johor, Malaysia

Johor Bahru (P160)
Johor constituency

Federal constituency
- Legislature: Dewan Rakyat
- MP: Akmal Nasrullah Mohd Nasir; PH
- Constituency created: 1955
- Constituency abolished: 1959
- Constituency re-created: 1974
- First contested: 1955
- Last contested: 2022

Demographics
- Population (2020): 177,823
- Electors (2026): 136,691
- Area (km²): 35
- Pop. density (per km²): 5,080.7

Johor Bahru is a federal constituency in Johor Bahru District, Johor, Malaysia, that has been represented in the Dewan Rakyat since 1955 to 1959 and 1974 to present.

The federal constituency was created in the 1955 redistribution and is mandated to return a single member to the Dewan Rakyat under the first past the post voting system.

== Demographics ==
Ethnic breakdown of Johor Bahru's electorate as of 2022
1. Malay (54.3%)
2. Chinese (39.3%)
3. Indian (5.60%)
4. Other ethnicities (0.70%)

As of 2020, Johor Bahru has a population of 177,823 people.

Age breakdown of Johor Bahru's electorate as of 2022
1. 18-20 (4.21%)
2. 21-29 (15.7%)
3. 30-39 (19.8%)
4. 40-49 (17.5%)
5. 50-59 (16.3%)
6. 60-69 (14.8%)
7. 70-79 (8.36%)
8. 80-89 (2.71%)
9. above 90 (0.68%)
Gender breakdown of Johor Bahru's electorate as of 2022
1. Male (50.1%)
2. Female (49.9%)

== History ==
=== Polling districts ===
According to the federal gazette issued on 2 July 2026, the Johor Bahru constituency has a total of 40 polling districts.

State constituency	Polling District	Code	Location
Larkin (N44)	Bandar Baru Uda	160/44/01	SK Kompleks Uda
Larkin (N44)	Uda Malinja	160/44/02	SMK Bandar Baru Uda
Larkin (N44)	Jalan Datin Halimah	160/44/03	SJK (C) Foon Yew 4
Larkin (N44)	Kampong Ungku Mohsein	160/44/04	Sekolah Agama Kampung Aman; Dewan Kolej Universiti Islam Johor Sultan Ibrahim
Larkin (N44)	Kampong Melayu Majedee I	160/44/05	SK Mohd Khir Johari
Larkin (N44)	Kampong Melayu Majeede II	160/44/06	Dewan Kampung Melayu
Larkin (N44)	Stulang Baru	160/44/07	SMA Al Quran Waddin
Larkin (N44)	Sepakat	160/44/08	SA Dato' Abdullah Esa
Larkin (N44)	Taman Baru	160/44/09	SK Taman Suria
Larkin (N44)	Rumah Pangsa Larkin	166/44/10	SK Tanjung Puteri
Larkin (N44)	Larkin Jaya	160/44/11	SA Dato' Onn Jaafar
Larkin (N44)	Larkin	160/44/12	SK Larkin 1; SJK (C) Foon Yew 3
Larkin (N44)	Taman Majedee	160/44/13	SA Kebun Teh
Larkin (N44)	Taman Kebun Teh	160/44/14	SJK (C) Foon Yew 1
Larkin (N44)	Taman Melodies	160/44/15	Sekolah Sri Utama
Larkin (N44)	Taman Abad	160/44/16	SK Angkatan Tentera
Larkin (N44)	Abad Jaya 1	160/44/17	Pusat Jawatankuasa Penduduk Warga Unggul Taman Century; Dewan Raya Taman Century
Larkin (N44)	Taman Skudai Kanan	160/44/18	SK Bandar Uda 2
Larkin (N44)	Kampong Larkin Jaya	160/44/19	SMK Saint Joseph (B)
Larkin (N44)	Abad Jaya 2	160/44/20	Dewan Raya Taman Century; SK Angkatan tentera
Larkin (N44)	Uda Mahsuri	160/44/21	SA Bandar Baru Uda
Larkin (N44)	Ulu Ayer Molek	160/44/22	Dewan Seberguna Bakti Kastam
Larkin (N44)	Kebun Teh	160/44/23	SJK (C) Foon Yew 3
Stulang (N45)	Majedee Bahru	160/45/01	SK Majidee Baru
Stulang (N45)	Sulaiman Menteri	160/45/02	Dewan Serbaguna Majidee; Dewan Komuniti dan Tadika KEMAS Ros Bestari
Stulang (N45)	Setanggi	160/45/03	SA Majidee Baru
Stulang (N45)	Sentosa	160/45/04	SK Sri Tebrau
Stulang (N45)	Sri Tebrau (1)	160/45/05	SMK Sri Tebrau
Stulang (N45)	Bakar Batu	160/45/06	SK Tebrau Bakar Batu; SA Bakar Batu; Dewan Serbaguna PPR Sri Stulang; Dewan Serbaguna Taman Desa Belantik
Stulang (N45)	Pelangi	160/45/07	SK Taman Pelangi
Stulang (N45)	Taman Maju Jaya	160/45/08	SA Bersepadu Johor Bahru
Stulang (N45)	Kampong Wadi Hana	160/45/09	Dewanraya Wadihana
Stulang (N45)	Bukit Senyum	160/45/10	Kolej Vokasional Tanjung Puteri
Stulang (N45)	Sri Pelangi	160/45/11	SMK Taman Pelangi
Stulang (N45)	Stulang	160/45/12	SM Foon Yew
Stulang (N45)	Taman Sri Setia	160/45/13	SA Taman Pelangi
Stulang (N45)	Lumba Kuda	160/45/14	SMK Dato Jaafar
Stulang (N45)	Bukit Chagar	160/45/15	SMK Dato Jaafar
Stulang (N45)	Desa Majidi	160/45/16	SA Kampung Dato' Sulaiman Menteri
Stulang (N45)	Sri Tebrau (2)	160/45/17	Dewan Serbaguna Sri Tebrau

=== Representation history ===
Members of Parliament for Johor Bahru
Parliament	No	Years	Member	Party	Vote Share
Constituency created
Johore Bahru
Federal Legislative Council
1st		1955–1959	Suleiman Abdul Rahman (سليمان عبدالرحمن)	Alliance (UMNO)	8,745; 75.73%
Constituency abolish, split to Johore Bahru Barat and Johore Bahru Timor
Parliament of Malaysia
Constituency recreated, renamed from Johore Bahru Timor and Johore Tenggara
Johore Bahru
4th	P114	1974–1978	Jaafar Hamzah (جعفر حمزه)	BN (UMNO)	27,042; 75.07%
5th	P114	1978–1982	Shahrir Abdul Samad (شهريار عبدالصمد)	BN (UMNO)	38,950; 71.57%
6th	P114	1982–1986	Shahrir Abdul Samad (شهريار عبدالصمد)	BN (UMNO)	47,825; 69.20%
Johor Bahru
7th	P130	1986–1988	Shahrir Abdul Samad (شهريار عبدالصمد)	BN (UMNO)	19,349; 53.06%
7th	P130	1988–1990	Shahrir Abdul Samad (شهريار عبدالصمد)	Independent	23,581; 64.06%
8th	P130	1990–1995	Mohamed Khaled Nordin (محمد خالد نورالدين)	BN (UMNO)	24,980; 58.47%
9th	P141	1995–1999	Mohamed Khaled Nordin (محمد خالد نورالدين)	BN (UMNO)	40,141; 79.76%
10th	P141	1999–2004	Mohamed Khaled Nordin (محمد خالد نورالدين)	BN (UMNO)	38,707; 73.23%
11th	P160	2004–2008	Shahrir Abdul Samad (شهريار عبدالصمد)	BN (UMNO)	54,073; 88.13%
12th	P160	2008–2013	Shahrir Abdul Samad (شهريار عبدالصمد)	BN (UMNO)	43,143; 70.80%
13th	P160	2013–2018	Shahrir Abdul Samad (شهريار عبدالصمد)	BN (UMNO)	44,509; 56.68%
14th	P160	2018–2022	Akmal Nasrullah Mohd Nasir (اكمل نصرالله محمد ناصر)	PH (PKR)	50,052; 62.31%
15th	P160	2022–present	Akmal Nasrullah Mohd Nasir (اكمل نصرالله محمد ناصر)	PH (PKR)	43,252; 45.82%

=== State constituency ===
Parliamentary constituency	State constituency						
Parliamentary constituency	1954–59*	1959–1974	1974–1986	1986–1995	1995–2004	2004–2018	2018–present
Johor Bahru				Gertak Merah			
Johor Bahru							Larkin
Johor Bahru					Stulang		
Johor Bahru				Tanjong Puteri			
Johore Bahru	Johore Bahru Central						
Johore Bahru	Johore Bahru Coastal						
Johore Bahru			Tanjong Petri				
Johore Bahru			Tiram				

=== Historical boundaries ===
State Constituency	Area				
State Constituency	1974	1984	1994	2003	2018
Gertak Merah		Gertak Merah; Kebun Teh; Larkin; Nong Chik; Taman Ungku Tun Aminah			
Larkin					Bandar Baru Uda; Kebun Teh; Larkin; Taman Majidee; Tanjong Puteri
Stulang			Bakar Batu; Bukit Chagar; Bukit Serene; Kampung Dato Sulaiman Menteri; Pasir Pelangi		
Tanjong Puteri	Bukit Chagar; Kampung Dato Sulaiman Menteri; Kebun Teh; Larkin; Pasir Pelangi	Kampung Majidee Baru; Taman Majidee; Taman Melodies; Tanjong Puteri; Wadi Hana	Kampung Majidee Baru; Pandan; Taman Majidee; Taman Melodies; Tanjong Puteri	Bandar Baru Uda; Kebun Teh; Larkin; Taman Majidee; Tanjong Puteri	
Tiram	Johor Jaya; Pasir Gudang; Plentong; Ulu Tiram; Tanjung Langsat				

=== Current state assembly members ===
No.	State Constituency	Member	Coalition (Party)
N44	Larkin	Mohd Hairi Mad Shah	BN (UMNO)
N45	Stulang	Andrew Chen Kah Eng	PH (DAP)

=== Local governments & postcodes ===
No.	State Constituency	Local Government	Postcode
N44	Larkin	Johor Bahru City Council	80050, 80150, 80250, 80300, 80350, 80400, 80500, 80888, 81100 Johor Bahru
N45	Stulang	Johor Bahru City Council	80050, 80150, 80250, 80300, 80350, 80400, 80500, 80888, 81100 Johor Bahru

== Election results ==
Malaysian general election, 2022
Party	Candidate	Votes	%	∆%
PH	Akmal Nasrullah Mohd Nasir	43,252	45.82	▲45.82
BN	Johan Arifin Mohd Ropi	27,211	28.83	▼8.86
PN	Mohd Mohtah Yacob	22,075	23.38	▲23.38
PEJUANG	Mohd Akhiri Mahmood	1,855	1.97	▲1.97
Total valid votes		93,162	100.00	
Total rejected ballots		837		
Unreturned ballots		291		
Turnout		95,521	69.22	▼11.29
Registered electors		136,368		
Majority		16,041	16.99	▼7.63
PH hold		Swing		
Source(s) https://lom.agc.gov.my/ilims/upload/portal/akta/outputp/1753254/PUB%20617%20PARLIMEN%20JOHOR.pdf

Malaysian general election, 2018
Party	Candidate	Votes	%	∆%
PKR	Akmal Nasrullah Mohd Nasir	50,052	62.31	▲18.99
BN	Shahrir Abdul Samad	30,270	37.69	▼18.99
Total valid votes		80,322	100.00	
Total rejected ballots		1,056		
Unreturned ballots		267		
Turnout		81,645	80.51	▼2.51
Registered electors		101,409		
Majority		19,782	24.62	▲11.26
PKR gain from BN		Swing		?
Source(s) "His Majesty's Government Gazette - Notice of Contested Election, Parliament for the State of Johore [P.U. (B) 244/2018]" (PDF). Attorney General's Chambers of Malaysia. 3 May 2018. Archived from the original (PDF) on 2019-12-29. "Federal Government Gazette - Results of Contested Election and Statements of the Poll after the Official Addition of Votes, Parliamentary Constituencies for the State of Johore [P.U. (B) 318/2018]" (PDF). Attorney General's Chambers of Malaysia. 28 May 2018.

Malaysian general election, 2013
Party	Candidate	Votes	%	∆%
BN	Shahrir Abdul Samad	44,509	56.68	▼14.12
PKR	Md Hashim Hussein	34,014	43.32	▲43.32
Total valid votes		78,523	100.00	
Total rejected ballots		1,284		
Unreturned ballots		158		
Turnout		79,965	83.02	▲13.43
Registered electors		96,321		
Majority		10,134	13.36	▼28.24
BN hold		Swing		
Source(s) "Federal Government Gazette - Notice of Contested Election, Parliament for the State of Johore [P.U. (B) 181/2013]" (PDF). Attorney General's Chambers of Malaysia. 26 April 2013. "Federal Government Gazette - Results of Contested Election and Statements of the Poll after the Official Addition of Votes, Parliamentary Constituencies for the State of Johore [P.U. (B) 222/2013]" (PDF). Attorney General's Chambers of Malaysia. 22 May 2013.

Malaysian general election, 2008
Party	Candidate	Votes	%	∆%
BN	Shahrir Abdul Samad	43,143	70.80	▼17.33
Parti Rakyat Malaysia	Hassan Abdul Karim	17,794	29.20	▲29.20
Total valid votes		60,937	100.00	
Total rejected ballots		1,391		
Unreturned ballots		112		
Turnout		62,440	69.59	▲1.04
Registered electors		89,725		
Majority		25,349	41.60	▼34.66
BN hold		Swing		

Malaysian general election, 2004
Party	Candidate	Votes	%	∆%
BN	Shahrir Abdul Samad	54,073	88.13	▲14.90
PAS	Atan Ahmad	7,281	11.87	▲11.87
Total valid votes		61,354	100.00	
Total rejected ballots		1,100		
Unreturned ballots		1		
Turnout		62,455	68.55	▼1.58
Registered electors		91,108		
Majority		46,792	76.26	▲29.80
BN hold		Swing		

Malaysian general election, 1999
Party	Candidate	Votes	%	∆%
BN	Mohamed Khaled Nordin	38,707	73.23	▼6.53
Parti Rakyat Malaysia	A. Razak Ahmad	14,149	26.77	▲26.77
Total valid votes		52,856	100.00	
Total rejected ballots		1,008		
Unreturned ballots		724		
Turnout		54,588	70.13	▼0.43
Registered electors		77,837		
Majority		24,558	46.46	▼21.33
BN hold		Swing		

Malaysian general election, 1995
Party	Candidate	Votes	%	∆%
BN	Mohamed Khaled Nordin	40,141	79.76	▲21.29
S46	Zahrah Mohd Yusof	6,023	11.97	▼27.38
PBS	Tan Tien Lim	4,165	8.28	▲8.28
Total valid votes		50,329	100.00	
Total rejected ballots		1,662		
Unreturned ballots		433		
Turnout		52,424	70.56	▲3.02
Registered electors		74,295		
Majority		34,118	67.79	▲48.67
BN hold		Swing		

Malaysian general election, 1990
Party	Candidate	Votes	%	∆%
BN	Mohamed Khaled Nordin	24,980	58.47	▲28.67
S46	Jaafar Onn	16,814	39.35	▲39.35
Independent	Ismail Wanjor	930	2.18	▲2.18
Total valid votes		42,724	100.00	
Total rejected ballots		1,132		
Unreturned ballots		0		
Turnout		43,856	67.54	▲6.02
Registered electors		64,933		
Majority		8,166	19.12	▼15.14
BN gain from Independent		Swing		?

Malaysian general by-election, 25 August 1988 Upon the resignation of incumbent, Shahrir Abdul Samad
Party	Candidate	Votes	%	∆%
Independent	Shahrir Abdul Samad	23,581	64.06	▲64.06
BN	Mas'ud Abdul Rahman	10,968	29.80	▼23.26
Parti Rakyat Malaysia	A. Razak Ahmad	2,260	6.14	▼40.80
Total valid votes		36,809	100.00	
Total rejected ballots		285		
Unreturned ballots		0		
Turnout		37,094	61.52	▼0.84
Registered electors		60,292		
Majority		12,613	34.26	▲28.14
Independent gain from BN		Swing		?

Malaysian general election, 1986
Party	Candidate	Votes	%	∆%
BN	Shahrir Abdul Samad	19,349	53.06	▼16.14
Parti Rakyat Malaysia	A. Razak Ahmad	17,114	46.94	▲16.14
Total valid votes		36,463	100.00	
Total rejected ballots		905		
Unreturned ballots		0		
Turnout		37,368	62.36	▼10.73
Registered electors		59,922		
Majority		2,235	6.12	▼32.28
BN hold		Swing		

Malaysian general election, 1982: Johore Bahru
Party	Candidate	Votes	%	∆%
BN	Shahrir Abdul Samad	47,825	69.20	▼2.37
Parti Rakyat Malaysia	A. Razak Ahmad	21,288	30.80	▲30.80
Total valid votes		69,113	100.00	
Total rejected ballots		2,888		
Unreturned ballots		0		
Turnout		72,001	73.09	▼2.51
Registered electors		98,505		
Majority		26,537	38.40	▼4.74
BN hold		Swing		

Malaysian general election, 1978: Johore Bahru
Party	Candidate	Votes	%	∆%
BN	Shahrir Abdul Samad	38,950	71.57	▼3.50
DAP	Chan Yeik Nung @ Chan Heng Jib	15,469	28.43	▲3.50
Total valid votes		54,419	100.00	
Total rejected ballots		2,422		
Unreturned ballots		0		
Turnout		56,841	75.60	▼7.27
Registered electors		75,186		
Majority		23,481	43.14	▼2.50
BN hold		Swing		

Malaysian general election, 1974: Johore Bahru
Party	Candidate	Votes	%	∆%
BN	Jaafar Hamzah	27,042	75.07	▲75.07
DAP	Quek Kow Hia	8,982	24.93	▲24.93
Total valid votes		36,024	100.00	
Total rejected ballots		1,328		
Unreturned ballots		0		
Turnout		37,352	82.27	
Registered electors		45,402		
Majority		18,060	45.64	
BN gain from Alliance		Swing		?

Malayan general election, 1955: Johore Bahru
Party	Candidate	Votes	%
Alliance	Suleiman Abd Rahman	8,745	75.73
[[Negara|National Party]]	Onn Ja'afar	2,802	24.27
Total valid votes		11,547	100.00
Total rejected ballots			
Unreturned ballots			
Turnout		11,547	77.60
Registered electors		14,880	
Majority		5,943	51.46
This was a new constituency created.
Source(s): The Straits Times.
