= Muhammad Husain =

Malaysian politician

- محمّد حسين

Member of the Malaysian Parliament for Pasir Puteh
- In office 8 March 2008 – 5 May 2013
- Preceded by: Che Min Che Ahmad (BN–UMNO)
- Succeeded by: Nik Mazian Nik Mohamad (PAS)
- Majority: 3,968 (2008)

State Chairman of Pakatan Harapan of Kelantan
- In office 9 March 2021 – 5 November 2024
- President: Wan Azizah Wan Ismail
- National Chairman: Anwar Ibrahim
- Preceded by: Husam Musa
- Succeeded by: Adly Zahari

Personal details
- Born: 29 December 1951 (age 74) Pasir Puteh, Kelantan, Federation of Malaya (now Malaysia)
- Party: Malaysian Islamic Party (PAS) (until 2015); National Trust Party (Malaysia) (AMANAH) (2015–present)
- Other political affiliations: Pakatan Rakyat (PR) (2008–2015); Pakatan Harapan (PH) (2015–present)
- Occupation: Politician

Muhammad Husain (born 29 December 1951) was the Member of the Parliament of Malaysia for the Pasir Puteh constituency in Kelantan from 2008 to 2013. He sat in Parliament as a member of Malaysian Islamic Party (PAS) in the Pakatan Rakyat opposition coalition. After leaving Parliament he joined 'Parti Ummah Sejahtera Malaysia', a PAS splinter movement formed out of concerns that the party was being insufficiently cooperative with its coalition allies, the Democratic Action Party and the People's Justice Party. In 2015, he joined Parti Amanah Negara (AMANAH), a component party of the Pakatan Harapan (PH) new opposition coalition.

== Election results ==
Parliament of Malaysia
Year	Constituency	Candidate	Votes	Pct	Opponent(s)	Votes	Pct	Ballots cast	Majority	Turnout
2008	P028 Pasir Puteh	Muhammad Husain (PAS)	28,365	53.76%	Amran Mat Nor (UMNO)	24,397	46.24%	53,778	3,968	83.52%
2022	P028 Pasir Puteh	Muhammad Husain (AMANAH)	3,867	4.77%	Nik Muhammad Zawawi Salleh (PAS)	52,937	65.37%	82,228	29,109	71.62%
2022	P028 Pasir Puteh	Muhammad Husain (AMANAH)	3,867	4.77%	Zawawi Othman (UMNO)	23,828	29.43%	82,228	29,109	71.62%
2022	P028 Pasir Puteh	Muhammad Husain (AMANAH)	3,867	4.77%	Wan Marzudi Wan Umar (PUTRA)	349	0.43%	82,228	29,109	71.62%
