= Shahrir Abdul Samad =

Malaysian politician

Yang Berbahagia Tan Sri Datuk Seri Utama Shahrir Abdul Samad PSM SUMW DPMJ PIS
- شهريار عبدالصمد

Ministerial roles
- 1978–1980: Parliamentary Secretary in the Prime Minister's Department
- 1980–1981: Deputy Minister of Finance
- 1981–1983: Deputy Minister of Trade and Industry
- 1983–1986: Minister of Federal Territories
- 1986–1987: Minister of Social Welfare
- 2008–2009: Minister of Domestic Trade and Consumer Affairs

Faction represented in Dewan Rakyat
- 1978–1988: Barisan Nasional
- 1988–1990: Independent
- 2004–2018: Barisan Nasional

Other roles
- 2017–2018: Chairman of Federal Land Development Authority (FELDA)

Personal details
- Born: Shahrir bin Abdul Samad; 22 November 1949 (age 76) Kuantan, Pahang, Federation of Malaya (now Malaysia)
- Citizenship: Malaysian
- Party: United Malays National Organisation (UMNO)
- Other political affiliations: Barisan Nasional (BN)
- Spouse: Shahrizan Abdullah
- Relations: Khalid Abdul Samad (younger brother)
- Education: University of Malaya
- Occupation: Politician
- Website: www.shahrir-umno.com

Shahrir bin Abdul Samad (Jawi: شهریار بن عبدالصمد; born 22 November 1949) is a Malaysian politician who was the Minister of Domestic Trade and Consumer Affairs (2008–2009), a Member of Parliament of Malaysia and the former chairman of the Barisan Nasional Backbenchers Club (BNBBC). He is a member of the United Malays National Organisation (UMNO), the largest political component party in the former ruling Barisan Nasional (BN) coalition. In Parliament – specifically the lower house of Parliament of Malaysia, the Dewan Rakyat – he represented the constituency of Johor Bahru in the state of Johor for six non-consecutive terms. (1978–1990, 2004–2018).

Khalid Abdul Samad, the former Minister of Federal Territories and the member of Parliament for Shah Alam, Selangor from the National Trust Party (Amanah) of Pakatan Harapan (PH) coalition; is the younger brother of Shahrir.

He was appointed the chairman of Federal Land Development Authority (FELDA) from 1 January 2017 to 14 May 2018.

== Early life and career ==
Shahrir was born in Kuantan, Pahang, and attended local primary schools. He later attended the Malay College Kuala Kangsar (MCKK) for his secondary education. He went on to gain an economics degree from the University of Malaya in Statistics, and a Master of Business Administration from the International Institute for Management Development in Lausanne, Switzerland.

In 1973 he became the youngest political secretary in the country when he became political secretary to Musa Hitam, later Deputy Prime Minister. After his tenure expired in 1975, he became political secretary to Prime Minister Tun Abdul Razak till 1976. Shahrir first ran for public office in the 1978 general election, when he won the Parliamentary seat of Johor Bahru. He was initially appointed Deputy Minister, of Trade and Industry, but later became Minister of Welfare, Youth and Sports, and in 1987 took up the post of Federal Territory Minister. Shahrir was sacked that year in the events leading up to the 1988 Malaysian constitutional crisis and Tengku Razaleigh Hamzah's challenge to Prime Minister and UMNO President Mahathir Mohamad. In 1988, Shahrir resigned from his Parliamentary seat, and ran for re-election in the resulting by-election as an independent. A year later, he rejoined UMNO, while Razaleigh went on to form Parti Melayu Semangat 46 (S46). He subsequently was dropped as UMNO candidate in the 1990, 1995 and 1999 general elections.

== Later political career ==
In 2004, he returned to run for 11th general election in Johor Bahru on a BN-UMNO ticket, and won. He later claimed that then Prime Minister Tun Abdullah Ahmad Badawi had offered him a post in the Cabinet, but declined, citing the large number of qualified MPs. Instead, he went on to chair the Public Accounts Committee in the Dewan Rakyat.

He was linked to the Generasi Profesional dan Pewaris Bangsa (PROWARIS), an NGO aligned with the ex-prime minister Mahathir Mohamad.

=== 2006 controversy ===
On 4 May 2006, Shahrir announced his resignation as chairman of the Barisan Nasional Backbenchers Club (BNBBC). Earlier that day, Parliament had been discussing the issue of a member of parliament (MP) who allegedly asked the Melaka Customs and Excise Department to "close one eye" to an illegal import shipment of timber. Lim Kit Siang of the Democratic Action Party (DAP) and the Leader of the Opposition moved a motion to refer the MP in question to the Dewan Rakyat House Committee of Rights and Privileges. Several BN MPs quickly voiced their disagreement with the motion, but Shahrir – according to one source – "shocked the House" when he stood and spoke in favour of the motion in order "to maintain the integrity of parliamentarians and Parliament". The motion was eventually rejected – in line with the BN policy of not supporting motions moved by the opposition – by the House. Shahrir walked out of the House and held a press conference in the Parliament lobby, telling reporters that "Even though it was an Opposition motion, we should support it for its importance to MPs and the House." He then announced his resignation as the Chairman of the BNBBC. The deputy chairman, Raja Ahmad Zainuddin Raja Omar, later told reporters he would attempt to persuade Shahrir to stay on.

After an emergency meeting, the BNBBC also announced they would ask Shahrir to stay on. In the meantime, the MP for Jasin, Mohammad Said Yusof, said he was the MP implicated in the matter. However, he insisted he had only asked for leniency on the grounds that the timber had been found to be illegal due to a technicality. Minister in the Prime Minister's Department in charge of Parliamentary Affairs, Datuk Seri Mohamed Nazri Aziz, said that "It is not that we disagree with Shahrir but it's an opposition motion and we usually reject their motions." He also told the press that the House Rights and Privileges Committee could not have an unnamed MP referred to it on the basis of a newspaper report. Nazri said that the Customs chief would have to complain to the Speaker and name the MP in question.

Later that week, Shahrir met with then Deputy Prime Minister and BN Chief Whip, Dato' Sri Najib Tun Razak to officially submit his resignation. While Najib accepted it, it was not immediately clear if he would initiate disciplinary action against Shahrir for breaking ranks with the party. Shahrir initially insisted that "This is not a party matter," but later told the press that he resigned "as I had breached the party's directive against supporting an Opposition motion."

Later, several backbenchers demanded that Shahrir's resignation be rescinded. The BNBBC secretary, Rosli Mat Hassan (MP for Dungun) issued a statement on the behalf of other backbenchers where he declared, "the unwritten rule that presently [makes] it mandatory for BN MPs to oppose any opposition motion regardless of merit [runs] counter to basic parliamentary practice and [infringes] on the duties of MPs". It was reported that Zaid Ibrahim, MP for Kota Bharu, was now leading a campaign to re-elect Shahrir as the BNBBC chairman. Shahrir's supporters said that it was their right to decide who led them, and implied that this was not Najib's prerogative. At the same time, the BNBBC's official position on the issue was that Shahrir had procedurally erred in supporting the motion, as the matter was beyond the purview of the Committee in question, which exists only to prevent a breach or abuse of Parliamentary privileges. A spokesperson also said that "The current procedure now is MPs must give a written notice to the Speaker, and only when the Speaker is satisfied, can the House decide whether the matter should be referred to the committee. ... In this episode, it was all done in a blink of an eye." Shahrir later reversed himself, saying "I made a mistake in regard to the parliamentary procedure involved. However, based on the political model, there was no mistake."

The following day, the then Prime Minister Tun Abdullah Ahmad Badawi issued an official directive on the matter, affirming that MPs could only vote along party lines. Zaid and most of the other backbenchers who had backed further autonomy told the press they accepted the decision. However, Rosli clashed with Minister in the Prime Minister's Department in charge of Parliamentary Affairs and Deputy Chief Whip Nazri Aziz, who said that "The Whip is only relaxed when it is lifted by the chief or the deputy chief Whip." Rosli said "...in the absence of his [the Chief Whip's] direction, the general rule is to that MPs are to vote according to their conscience..." Although many backbenchers said they considered Shahrir the BNBBC chairman, Abdullah said that the government had planned to sack Shahrir, "But before we could do that he resigned, and we respect his decision."

=== Ministership 2008–2009 ===
In 2008, following the 12th general election which saw BN's majority significantly slashed, Tun Abdullah Ahmad Badawi appointed Shahrir as Domestic Trade and Consumer Affairs Minister. In the 2009 UMNO General Assembly, Shahrir lost his bid for a place in the Supreme Council and consequently resigned from the Cabinet.

=== Retirement ===
On 4 February 2023, Shahrir announced his retirement from politics after decades by not defending his position as the Division Chairman of UMNO of Johor Bahru which he has held since the 1980s in the 2023 UMNO party election. He expressed confidence that there were many good future leaders in the party. In response, State Chairman of UMNO of Johor Mohamed Khaled Nordin thanked and conveyed his appreciation towards Shahrir for his contributions to the party.

== Election results ==
Parliament of Malaysia
Year	Constituency	Candidate	Votes	Pct	Opponent(s)	Votes	Pct	Ballots cast	Majority	Turnout
1978	P114 Johore Bahru	Shahrir Abdul Samad (UMNO)	38,950	71.57%	Chan Yeik Nung @ Chan Heng Jib (DAP)	15,469	28.43%	U/A	23,481	U/A
1982	P114 Johore Bahru	Shahrir Abdul Samad (UMNO)	47,825	69.20%	A. Razak Ahmad (PSRM)	21,288	30.80%	U/A	26,537	U/A
1986	P130 Johor Bahru	Shahrir Abdul Samad (UMNO)	19,349	53.06%	A. Razak Ahmad (PSRM)	17,114	46.94%	37,368	2,235	62.36%
1988	P130 Johor Bahru	Shahrir Abdul Samad (IND)	23,581	64.06%	Mas'ud Abd Rahman (UMNO)	10,968	29.80%	37,094	12,613	61.52%
1988	P130 Johor Bahru	Shahrir Abdul Samad (IND)	23,581	64.06%	A. Razak Ahmad (PSRM)	2,260	6.14%	37,094	12,613	61.52%
2004	P160 Johor Bahru	Shahrir Abdul Samad (UMNO)	54,073	88.13%	Atan Ahmad (PAS)	7,281	11.87%	62,455	46,792	68.55%
2008	P160 Johor Bahru	Shahrir Abdul Samad (UMNO)	43,143	70.80%	Hassan Abdul Karim (PRM)	17,794	29.20%	62,440	25,349	69.59%
2013	P160 Johor Bahru	Shahrir Abdul Samad (UMNO)	44,509	56.68%	Md Hashim Hussein (PKR)	34,014	43.32%	79,965	10,134	83.02%
2018	P160 Johor Bahru	Shahrir Abdul Samad (UMNO)	30,270	37.55%	Akmal Nasrullah Mohd Nasir (PKR)	50,052	62.45%	81,645	19,782	80.50%

== Honours ==
=== Honours of Malaysia ===
- Malaysia
  - Commander of the Order of Loyalty to the Crown of Malaysia (PSM) – Tan Sri (2012)
- Johor
  - Second Class of the Sultan Ibrahim Medal (PIS II) (1979)
  - Knight Commander of the Order of the Crown of Johor (DPMJ) – Dato' (1980)
- Federal Territory (Malaysia)
  - Grand Knight of the Order of the Territorial Crown (SUMW) – Datuk Seri Utama (2010)

== Notes and references ==
=== Other references ===
- Samad, Shahrir Abdul (2005). "shahrir-umno". Retrieved 29 October 2005.
