= Tok Janggut =

Malaysian rebel

Haji Hassan bin Munas (1853 – 25 May 1915), also nicknamed Tok Janggut (Old Long Beard), was a major participant in Kelantan, British Malaya (present-day Malaysia) during the Kelantan rebellion.

== Early life ==
Born in Kampung Jeram, Pasir Puteh, Kelantan in 1853, Tok Janggut received his early education (pendidikan pondok) in Kelantan and in Mecca and was a master of silat, a Malaysian martial art. His father was Panglima Munas, who served as a commander in the Kelantan palace.

== Resistance ==
After the Anglo-Siamese Treaty of 1909, Britain took over the jurisdiction of Kelantan from Siam without the consultation of the Sultan. The change in administration saw significant changes in the state's political system, and foreign relations was handled by Britain from 1910.

The local government of Pasir Puteh in Kelantan was taken over by British administrators. British officer Encik Abdul Latiff took over the administration of Kelantan from the local leader, Engku Jeram. Latiff was viewed as an outsider by the Kelantan locals, both for his subservience to the British colonial administration and for the fact that, although Malay, he was not from Kelantan, which has a culture and dialect distinct from other Malay areas of Southeast Asia. Furthermore, anecdotal evidence suggests that Latif perhaps considered himself above the largely rural Kelantanese and was notably stern in his tax collection duties.

=== Tok Janggut joins the resistance ===
The deposed local administrator, Engku Besar Jeram, called upon Tok Janggut, Haji Said, Che Sahak Merbol and Penghulu Adam to discuss the tense situation in Kelantan. At the meeting, a pact was signed by the participants which prohibited any one of them to co-operate with the British. Their independence fight gained support from most Kelantan residents, whose refusal to pay taxes meant the revenue of the district dropped by half in one year.

In 1915, Latiff discovered that Janggut was responsible, and sent Sergeant Sulaiman and six other policemen to arrest him. The officers found him surrounded by 2,000 of his followers, many of whom were carrying weapons. Tok Janggut did not try and escape: he stood his ground and refused to go with the officers. In the heat of the argument, Janggut stabbed Seargeant Sulaiman with his keris. Sulaiman shortly died, and the crowd disarmed the other officers, who were sent back to Latif.

Encik Latif attempted to rally the surrounding villages against Janggut, but this failed because Tok Janggut was now marching towards Pasir Puteh with his followers. Latif fled Pasir Puteh to avoid Janggut, and to seek an audience with the Sultan of Kelantan in Kota Bharu. Tok Janggut's forces fought against the British in Pasir Puteh, and the rebels triumphed. They remained in Pasir Puteh for three days and declared the independence of Pasir Puteh from British rule. Engku Besar was selected as Sultan of Pasir Puteh, with Tok Janggut as his chief minister. Having heard about Janggut's rebellion from Encik Latif, the Sultan branded Janggut a traitor and called a meeting with the state officials. The rebel leaders were ordered to surrender themselves within seven days, failing which they would be arrested and sentenced to death. They refused to surrender, and a $500 reward was offered to anyone who arrested Engku Besar, Tok Janggut, Haji Said, Haji Ishak or Penghulu Adam.

In May 1915, 1,500 British troops marched to Pasir Puteh to attempt to quell the rebellion. Tok Janggut got wind of this, however, and advised his followers to flee. He and the other rebel leaders hid in the jungle, avoiding the troops. The soldiers returned to Singapore on 17 May, having failed in their mission. After the British troops withdrew, Tok Janggut came out of hiding. News of this reached the authorities in Kota Bharu, who decided to send Indian troops led by British officers in a second attempt at ending the rebellion. The rebel leaders went into hiding again, and out of anger the troops burnt down Jeram town, including the houses of Tok Janggut and many of his followers. Tok Janggut marched on Pasir Puteh town (where the Indian troops had gone after burning down Jeram) on 25 June 1915, with 1,000 of his followers, armed with guns and traditional weaponry. Even though the rebel forces outnumbered their enemy, the Indian troops were much better-equipped. Many of Tok Janggut's followers fled, and he himself was killed. All the corpses were buried except Janggut's: his dead body was exhibited throughout Kota Bharu and Pasir Puteh, as an example of the consequences of rebelling against government rule. Tok Janggut's body was buried in Palekbang afterwards, ending the rebellion against British rule in Kelantan.
