= ProWaris =

ProWaris Pertubuhan Profesional Melayu dan Pewaris Bangsa ݢنراسي ڤروفيسيونل دان ڤواريث بڠسا
- Founded: 2001
- Founder: Feriz Omar
- Dissolved: 2009
- Type: Non-profit; NGO
- Location: Kuala Lumpur
- Region served: Malaysia
- Fields: Politic
- Key people: Feriz Omar (President)
- Website: www.prowaris.org

Pertubuhan Profesional Melayu & Pewaris Bangsa (English: Malay Professionals and Race Inheritors Organisation; better known by its abbreviation: ProWaris) is a non-governmental organization (NGO) that started in 2001 as a movement of Malay professionals aiming to fight for the Malay's agendas.

== History and leadership ==
The idle and delayed movement of ProWaris can be attributed to Malaysia's struggling economy and conflicting interests between the government and its people. Its leadership attempted to raise a third voice—in order to influence the United Malays National Organisation (UMNO) party—a voice similar to the leadership of Shahrir Abdul Samad; who was more inline with the ex-prime minister Mahathir Mohamad. ProWaris demanded that Prime Minister Abdullah Ahmad Badawi resign based on his weak leadership.

Its president, Feriz Omar, was said to have accused the Malays of lacking the courage to confront the country's leadership issues. Feriz Omar denied making such statements.

ProWaris became inactive and dormant notably after Shahrir lost his bid for a place in the Supreme Council in the party leadership election in 2009 UMNO General Assembly and consequently resigned from the Cabinet.
