= Pasir Puteh District =

Pasir Puteh District Pasey Puteh (Kelantan–Pattani Malay)
- District of Kelantan
- Jajahan Pasir Puteh
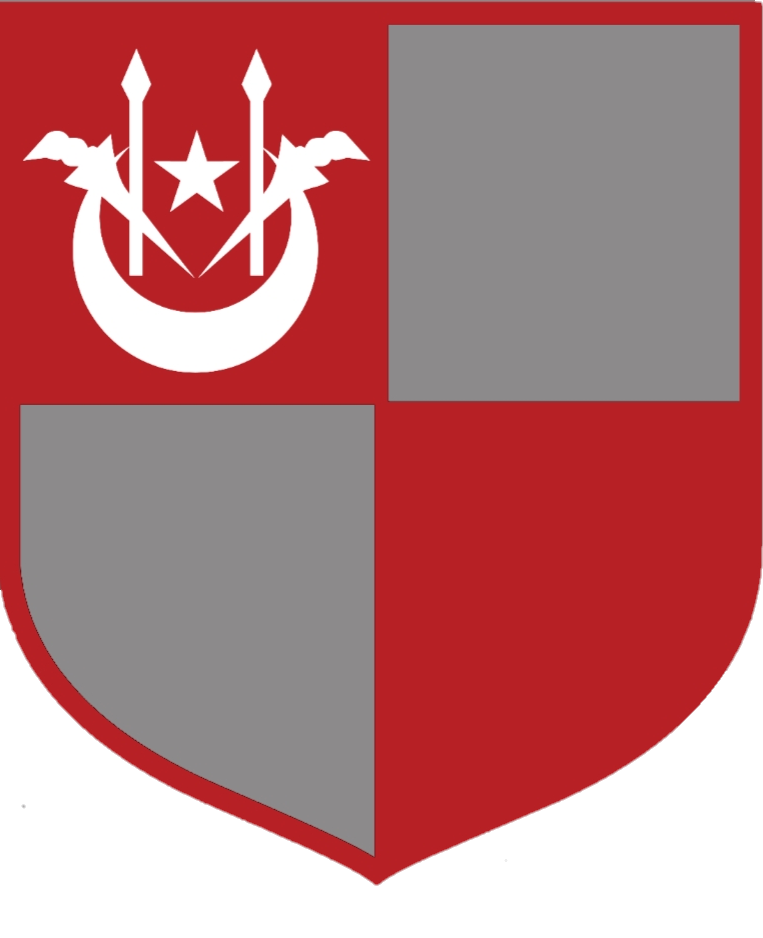
- Flag Seal Coat of arms

- Location of Pasir Puteh District in Kelantan
- Interactive map of Pasir Puteh District
- Location of Pasir Puteh District in Malaysia
- Coordinates: 5°50′N 102°24′E
- Country: Malaysia
- State: Kelantan
- Seat: Pasir Puteh
- Local area government(s): Pasir Puteh District Council

Government
  - District officer: Mohd Roshdi Bin Ismail

Area
  - Total: 423 km^{2} (163 sq mi)

Population (2021)
  - Total: 137,400
  - Density: 325/km^{2} (841/sq mi)
- Time zone: UTC+8 (MST)
  - Summer (DST): UTC+8 (Not observed)
- Postcode: 16xxx
- Calling code: +6-09
- Vehicle registration plates: D

Pasir Puteh District Council Majlis Daerah Pasir Puteh

Type
- Type: Local authority

History
- Founded: 1 January 1979

Leadership
- President: Mohd Roshdi Bin Ismail
- District secretary: Noor Azman Md Nawi

Meeting place
- 16800 Pasir Puteh, Kelantan Darul Naim.

Website
- mdpputeh.kelantan.gov.my

Pasir Puteh District (Kelantanese: Jajahey Pasey Puteh) is a district (jajahan) in Kelantan, Malaysia. The town of Pasir Putih is situated on the bank of Semerak River, about 30 kilometers to the south of Kota Bharu. Pasir Puteh district borders Besut District, Terengganu to its south-east. It is also adjacent to Machang and is near to the highway which connects Besut to Kota Bharu.

== History ==
Before this place was known as Pasir Puteh, it was known as Pangkalan Limbungan. The town of Pasir Puteh derived its name after Sultan Muhammad IV visited. The Sultan was very impressed to see the white sand shining along the riverbanks. Hence in 1911, the Sultan declared the name of this place as Pasir Puteh, which meant white sand. This is the place where a Kelantan warrior, Tok Janggut, raised an army of Malay warriors to oppose the introduction of taxation in Kelantan.

== Education ==
Several types of schools can be found in Pasir Puteh. Among the schools in Pasir Puteh are:

- Sekolah Menengah Kebangsaan Bukit Jawa
- Sekolah Menengah Kebangsaan Cherang Ruku
- Sekolah Menengah Kebangsaan Gaal
- Sekolah Menengah Kebangsaan Jeram
- Sekolah Menengah Kebangsaan Kamil
- Sekolah Menengah Kebangsaan Dato' Ismail
- Sekolah Menengah Kebangsaan Seri Aman
- Sekolah Menengah Kebangsaan Sri Maharaja
- Sekolah Menengah Kebangsaan Tok Janggut
- Sekolah Menengah Kebangsaan Padang Pak Amat
- Sekolah Menengah Sains Pasir Puteh

The pre-university institute, which is Kolej Matrikulasi Kelantan (KMKt) also located within this district.

== Demographics ==
Historical population
Year	Pop.	±%
1991	96,348	—
2000	104,404	+8.4%
2010	113,191	+8.4%
2020	136,157	+20.3%

Population in Pasir Puteh is about 117,383 (2010).

Ranking Population of Jajahan Pasir Puteh.

Rank	Daerah/Mukim	Population 2000
1	Semerak	21,670
2	Bukit Jawa	19,329
3	Limbongan (Pasir Puteh Town)	14,164
4	Padang Pak Amat	13,360
5	Bukit Abal	10,624
6	Gong Datok	8,721
7	Jeram	8,552
8	Bukit Awang	7,984

== Federal Parliament and State Assembly Seats ==
List of LMS district representatives in the Federal Parliament (Dewan Rakyat)

Parliament	Seat Name	Member of Parliament	Party
P28	Pasir Puteh	Nik Muhammad Zawawi Salleh	Perikatan Nasional (PAS)

List of LMS district representatives in the State Legislative Assembly of Kelantan

Parliament	State	Seat Name	State Assemblyman	Party
P28	N29	Selising	Tuan Saripuddin Tuan Ismail	Perikatan Nasional (PAS)
P28	N30	Limbongan	Nor Asilah Mohamed Zain	Perikatan Nasional (PAS)
P28	N31	Semerak	Nor Sham Sulaiman	Perikatan Nasional (PAS)
P28	N32	Gaal	Mohd Rodzi Ja'afar	Perikatan Nasional (PAS)

== Climate ==
Pasir Puteh has a tropical rainforest climate (Af) with moderate rainfall from February to April and heavy to very heavy rainfall in the remaining months.

Climate data for Pasir Puteh
Month	Jan	Feb	Mar	Apr	May	Jun	Jul	Aug	Sep	Oct	Nov	Dec	Year
Mean daily maximum °C (°F)	28.8 (83.8)	29.8 (85.6)	31.1 (88.0)	32.2 (90.0)	32.5 (90.5)	32.1 (89.8)	31.8 (89.2)	31.5 (88.7)	31.4 (88.5)	30.7 (87.3)	29.5 (85.1)	28.8 (83.8)	30.9 (87.5)
Daily mean °C (°F)	25.5 (77.9)	26.1 (79.0)	26.9 (80.4)	27.8 (82.0)	28.2 (82.8)	27.8 (82.0)	27.5 (81.5)	27.3 (81.1)	27.2 (81.0)	26.9 (80.4)	26.3 (79.3)	26.5 (79.7)	27.0 (80.6)
Mean daily minimum °C (°F)	22.3 (72.1)	22.4 (72.3)	22.7 (72.9)	23.5 (74.3)	23.9 (75.0)	23.6 (74.5)	23.2 (73.8)	23.2 (73.8)	23.1 (73.6)	23.2 (73.8)	23.2 (73.8)	23.0 (73.4)	23.1 (73.6)
Average rainfall mm (inches)	262 (10.3)	122 (4.8)	119 (4.7)	86 (3.4)	137 (5.4)	162 (6.4)	160 (6.3)	209 (8.2)	265 (10.4)	296 (11.7)	504 (19.8)	625 (24.6)	2,947 (116)
Source: Climate-Data.org
