= 12th Malaysian Parliament =

Parliament between 2008 and 2013

Coordinates: 2.725759°N 101.942032°E

The 12th Malaysian Parliament is the last meeting of the legislative branch of the government of Malaysia, the Parliament, comprising the directly elected lower house, the Dewan Rakyat, and the appointed upper house, the Dewan Negara. It met for the first time at the Malaysian Houses of Parliament on 28 April 2008 and met for the last time on 29 November 2012. The King then dissolved the Parliament on 3 April 2013. The dissolution was announced by the Prime Minister Najib Razak after it consented by the King.

The 12th Parliament was the first to meet where the governing Barisan Nasional coalition does not have a 2/3 supermajority in the Dewan Rakyat necessary to amend the Constitution. In the 2008 general election, opposition parties won a record 82 of the 222 seats in the Dewan Rakyat, quadrupling the share they held previously. On 1 April, leaders from Parti Keadilan Rakyat, the Democratic Action Party and PAS announced the formation of the Pakatan Rakyat, a coalition comprising the three main opposition parties in Parliament. They also announced that Wan Azizah Wan Ismail, president of PKR, would be the new Leader of the Opposition, making her the first woman to assume the post. The 12th Parliament was also the first to have regular live broadcasts of Dewan Rakyat debates on national public television, and saw the first instance of a supply bill approved by division instead of a voice vote. In June 2008, the two members of parliament from the Sabah Progressive Party (SAPP, a BN component party) announced they would be filing a motion of no confidence against the Prime Minister, a first in Malaysian Parliamentary history.

== Dates of sessions ==
| Session | Meeting | Date |
|---|---|---|
| 1 | 1 | 28 April – 29 May 2008 |
| 1 | 2 | 23 June – 17 July 2008 |
| 1 | 3 | 18 August – 18 December 2008 |
| 1 | 4 | 12 January 2009 |
| 2 | 1 | 16 January – 23 May 2009 |
| 2 | 2 | 15 June – 7 July 2009 |
| 2 | 3 | 19 October – 17 December 2009 |
| 3 | 1 | 15 March – 22 April 2010 |
| 3 | 2 | 7 June – 15 July 2010 |
| 3 | 3 | 11 October – 16 December 2010 |
| 4 | 1 | 7 March – 7 April 2011 |
| 4 | 2 | 13–30 June 2011 |
| 4 | 3 | 3 October – 1 December 2011 |
| 5 | 1 | 12 March – 19 April 2012 |
| 5 | 2 | 11–28 June 2012 |
| 5 | 3 | 24 September – 29 November 2012 |

== Events ==
The 12th Parliament set a number of firsts in Malaysian history, in addition to being the first where the Barisan Nasional government sat without its customary 2/3 majority in the Dewan Rakyat. New Information Minister Ahmad Shabery Cheek announced that 30 minutes of each question time would be broadcast live on public television, with the possibility of a complete broadcast if demand was sufficient. Wan Azizah became the first woman leader of the opposition, with 24 women MPs total, 10 from the opposition ranks. Meanwhile, for the first time two chief ministers of opposition states—Lim Guan Eng of Penang and Khalid Ibrahim of Selangor—would also sit as members of the Dewan Rakyat. A record number of Indian Malaysians, 10, sit in the Dewan Rakyat, while 99 of the 222 members of the Dewan Rakyat are first-time MPs. The Speaker and all his deputies, for the first time, hailed from East Malaysia.

=== First sitting ===
The election of the Deputy Speakers sparked a minor controversy, as Lim Kit Siang of the opposition Democratic Action Party nominated Tan Seng Giaw for one of the two posts. The election of the Speaker had been unanimous, as no other candidates were nominated. Wan Junaidi Tuanku Jaafar received 157 votes, while Ronald Kiandee obtained 140 votes. Tan came in third with 81 votes.

After the MPs were sworn in on the first day of the first session of the Dewan Rakyat, all except Opposition Leader Wan Azizah received personal invitations for them and their spouses to attend the official opening of Parliament by the Yang di-Pertuan Agong Mizan Zainal Abidin the next day. Wan Azizah demanded an explanation as to why she only received a letter, and why her husband Anwar Ibrahim, a controversial former Deputy Prime Minister and now the de facto leader of Pakatan Rakyat, was not officially invited to attend the ceremony. They later received an official invitation; Anwar's attendance the following day was the first time he had been in the Houses of Parliament since his sacking in 1998.

The first full day Parliament sat was fraught with controversy. Karpal Singh of the DAP delayed proceedings by protesting that several MPs had not been validly sworn in because they had not raised their right hands, a claim the Speaker rejected. Karpal subsequently exchanged heated words with Bung Mokhtar Radin, calling him "big foot", with Bung retorting that he was a "big monkey". During question time, the Speaker gave one question for the Prime Minister to Razali Ibrahim and refused to permit supplementary follow-up questions, a decision Lim Kit Siang denounced as "making a mockery" of the House, branding it as part of "a conspiracy to silent the opposition MPs". After the Prime Minister personally intervened, the Speaker permitted Abdul Hadi Awang of PAS to ask one follow-up question. Azmin Ali of PKR also protested the Speaker's allocation of questions, arguing that as Leader of the Opposition, Wan Azizah had the right to first ask the Prime Minister a question, and that BN backbenchers received a disproportionate number of questions.

The controversial debate led Information Minister Ahmad Shabery Cheek to suggest that the government would review live broadcasts of the first 30 minutes of question time because "it was misused to seek cheap publicity and raise trivial matters". He later said that he would propose to the Cabinet that plans to broadcast future question times be shelved. In response, Deputy Speaker Wan Junaidi said it was too early to make a firm decision about the future of live broadcasts: "I feel the government should determine if this is a first-day phenomenon or if it will continue." Prime Minister Abdullah also called for the cancellation of the live broadcasts, but the Cabinet decided to continue them for the time being.

On 28 May, controversy arose in the Dewan Rakyat after Pakatan Rakyat MPs protested that the outcome of a voice vote on part of the Supplementary Supply Bill 2008 (2007) had been unclear. Some observers suggested that the number of Pakatan Rakyat MPs in the chamber at the time had actually exceeded the number of Barisan Nasional MPs, indicating that the motion could actually have failed. After fifteen of the PR MPs requested a recorded vote, the Deputy Speaker announced a division on the question of the motion, a first in living memory. Many BN MPs were forced to rush to the chamber to vote, including the Prime Minister; the motion ultimately passed, 92 in favour and 60 against. Education Minister Hishammuddin Hussein later criticised the request for a division, saying that "all the fuss from them (opposition MPs) is just to disturb and disrupt the proceedings". PKR whip Azmin Ali however called the vote a moral victory for the opposition, saying "This is the first I have seen the prime minister running into the House."

As the first sitting of the Dewan Rakyat neared its close at the end of May, The Malaysian Insider pronounced that it was "a different House for all who enter," citing how now Cabinet members' lives revolved around Parliamentary sessions, with Ministers being forced to attend to answer questions and participate in votes.

=== No-confidence vote ===
On 18 June 2008, Chua Soon Bui and Eric Enchin Majimbun, both MPs from the Sabah Progressive Party (SAPP, a BN component) announced they would be supporting a motion of no confidence against the Prime Minister the following Monday (23 June 2008), citing the federal government's failure to control illegal immigration into Sabah, poor economic management and a loss of confidence in Abdullah's leadership. The party president, Yong Teck Lee, suggested the party could quit the BN coalition by the end of the week.

Former opposition leader Lim Kit Siang of the DAP expressed doubt about the motion's viability, saying "There is no provision for a no-confidence motion under the standing orders." As of 18 June 2008, there is no provision for whether a simple majority or a 2/3 supermajority is required to pass a motion of no confidence. Since the motion would not be privileged in the agenda of the Dewan Rakyat, for it to be debated on Monday the government would have to set aside its scheduled business. In addition, the Standing Orders require the house to be given advance notice of any motions, ordinary or substantive. Lim suggested that the only way the motion could be tabled and debated on Monday was if the Speaker ruled it was a "substantive and extraordinary" motion, giving it precedence over other business in the Order Paper.

== Composition ==
| Party or alliance | | Votes | % | Seats | +/– |
|---|---|---|---|---|---|
| Barisan Nasional | United Malays National Organisation | 2,371,867 | 29.95 | 79 | –30 |
| Barisan Nasional | Malaysian Chinese Association | 849,108 | 10.72 | 15 | –16 |
| Barisan Nasional | Parti Gerakan Rakyat Malaysia | 184,548 | 2.33 | 2 | –8 |
| Barisan Nasional | Malaysian Indian Congress | 179,422 | 2.27 | 3 | –6 |
| Barisan Nasional | Parti Pesaka Bumiputera Bersatu | 131,243 | 1.66 | 14 | +3 |
| Barisan Nasional | Sarawak United Peoples' Party | 119,264 | 1.51 | 6 | 0 |
| Barisan Nasional | Sarawak Progressive Democratic Party | 52,645 | 0.66 | 4 | 0 |
| Barisan Nasional | UPKO | 45,119 | 0.57 | 4 | 0 |
| Barisan Nasional | United Sabah Party | 44,525 | 0.56 | 3 | –1 |
| Barisan Nasional | Sabah Progressive Party | 43,595 | 0.55 | 2 | –2 |
| Barisan Nasional | Parti Rakyat Sarawak | 33,410 | 0.42 | 6 | New |
| Barisan Nasional | People's Progressive Party | 16,800 | 0.21 | 0 | –1 |
| Barisan Nasional | Liberal Democratic Party | 8,297 | 0.10 | 1 | +1 |
| Barisan Nasional | Parti Bersatu Rakyat Sabah | | | 1 | 0 |
| Barisan Nasional | Total | 4,036,248 | 50.96 | 140 | –58 |
| Pakatan Rakyat | People's Justice Party | 1,471,150 | 18.58 | 31 | +30 |
| Pakatan Rakyat | Pan-Malaysian Islamic Party | 1,166,918 | 14.73 | 23 | +15 |
| Pakatan Rakyat | Democratic Action Party | 1,107,960 | 13.99 | 28 | +17 |
| Pakatan Rakyat | Total | 3,746,028 | 47.30 | 82 | +62 |
| Parti Rakyat Malaysia | | 19,126 | 0.24 | 0 | 0 |
| Sarawak National Party | | 8,615 | 0.11 | 0 | 0 |
| Federated Sabah People's Front | | 942 | 0.01 | 0 | New |
| Independents | | 65,331 | 0.82 | 0 | –1 |
| Total | | 7,919,885 | 100.00 | 222 | +3 |
| Valid votes | | 7,919,885 | 97.83 | | |
| Invalid/blank votes | | 175,863 | 2.17 | | |
| Total votes | | 8,095,748 | 100.00 | | |
| Registered voters/turnout | | 10,740,228 | 75.38 | | |
Source: Election Passport, CLEA

Dewan Negara
| Mode of Appointment | Seats |
| By the King | 44 |
| By the State Legislative Council | 26 |
| Total | 70 |

== Leadership ==
=== Dewan Negara ===
- The President: Abdul Hamid Pawanteh
- Vice-president: Wong Foon Meng

=== Dewan Rakyat ===
- Speaker: Pandikar Amin Mulia
- Deputy Speakers: Wan Junaidi Tuanku Jaafar and Ronald Kiandee

==== Government (Barisan Nasional) leadership ====
- Prime Minister: Najib Tun Razak
- Deputy Prime Minister: Muhyiddin Yassin
- Chief Whip: Muhyiddin Yassin
- Chairman of the Backbenchers Club: Tiong King Sing
- Deputy Chairman of the Backbenchers Club: Bung Mokhtar Radin

==== Opposition (Pakatan Rakyat) leadership ====
- Leader of the Opposition: Anwar Ibrahim (since 28 August 2008)
- Parliamentary Leader of DAP: Lim Kit Siang
- President of PAS: Abdul Hadi Awang

== Changes in membership ==
On 26 August 2008, Wan Azizah Wan Ismail's seat was officially filled in by her husband Datuk Seri Anwar Ibrahim, after he claimed victory over UMNO candidate Arif Shah in Permatang Pauh. With his entrance into Parliament, Anwar Ibrahim will become the Opposition Leader.

== Executives ==
=== Higher Administration ===
1. Lamien Sawiyo, Director General
2. Noor Rosidi Abdul Latif, Legal Adviser
3. Tengku Nasaruddin Tengku Mohamed, Head of Corporate Communication
4. Asri Adnan, Head of Research
5. Che Seman Pa Chik, Head of Legislative Affairs
6. Riduan Rahmat, Head of Human Resource & Management Service
7. Muhd. Sujairi Abdullah, Head of International Relations & Protocol
8. Ruhani Ali, Head of Building & Landscape Management

=== Senate ===
1. Zamani Sulaiman, Clerk
2. Lt. Col. (Rtd.) Ahmad Shanusi Che Mat, Chief Sergeant-at-Arms
3. Amisyahrizan Amir Khan, Officer-in-Charge (Legislative & Proceeding)
4. Monarita Mohd. Hassan, Officer-in-Charge (Documentation)
5. Zulfa Amirah Mohd. Zufri, Officer-in-Charge (Simultaneous Interpretation)

=== House of Representatives ===
1. Roosme Hamzah, Clerk
2. Lt. Col. (Rtd.) Morad Omar, Chief Sergeant-at-Arms
3. Mohd. Ikram Rahimi, Officer-in-Charge (Legislative & Proceeding)
4. Azhari Hamzah, Officer-in-Charge (Documentation)
5. Mazidah Mohamed, Officer-in-Charge (Simultaneous Interpretation)

== See also ==
- Parliament of Malaysia
