= Party whip (Malaysia) =

In the Parliament of Malaysia, the political parties appoint party whips to ensure party discipline, help manage legislative business and carry out a variety of other functions on behalf of the party leadership. The most important function of a government party whip is to ensure that sufficient number of members and senators are present to take part in voting in the chamber, to maintain a parliamentary quorum and to prevent censure motions succeeding. Their roles in the chamber include taking divisions, and arranging pairs which affect the ability of members and senators to leave parliament during sittings, as well as the entitlement to be absent during divisions.

In practice, Malaysian whips play a lesser role than their counterparts in the United Kingdom, as party discipline in Malaysia is heavily controlled; parliamentary votes are fully in tandem with the official positions of the various political parties. The role of the whip becomes more critical the lower the majority the government has in the lower house of Parliament (Dewan Rakyat).

Party whips also exist in the thirteen state legislative assemblies of Malaysia.

== Duties ==
Whips are essential to the day-to-day running of the house. They assist the party business managers arrange the order of business on the floor. They also draw up lists of speakers in debates, which (though not binding) assist the occupant of the chair in deciding whom to call on. The whips play the primary role in managing business in the parallel debating chamber. The Government Chief Whip has the same power as ministers and deputy ministers to move business motions. This right was extended with the creation of the parallel chamber (then called the Main Committee) to facilitate movement of business between it and the floor of the House of Representatives. The right can also be exercised by another whip acting on the Chief Whip's behalf.

Whips also play a central role in voting. During each vote (or "division"), whips ensure that their fellow party members are present and seated on the correct side of the house while votes are counted. Acting as tellers, the whips also count the votes. In a typical vote in the House of Representatives, where the Government and Opposition are on opposite sides, each will provide two tellers. One Government whip and one Opposition whip will count the votes in favour of the motion, and the other two will count the votes against. In the Senate, each side provides one whip.

== History ==
Derived from the Chief Whip of the British Parliament, the concept of the whip – which also refers to the instructions issued by the Chief Whip – has been in force since 1955 when a national legislature for Malaya was first elected. The party governing then was the coalition of the Alliance, which governed until the mid-1970s, when it was renamed as the Barisan Nasional (National Front; commonly abbreviated as BN). As of 2006, the Chief Whip was Deputy Prime Minister Najib Razak, and his deputies were Minister in the Prime Minister's Department in charge of Parliamentary Affairs Nazri Aziz, Transport Minister Chan Kong Choy, and Works Minister Samy Vellu.

There is some dispute about the precise nature of the whip, such as when it is in force. Convention in most Commonwealth countries that use the Westminster system, such as Malaysia, is that the whip is not in force unless explicitly made clear by the Chief Whip or his deputy. However, Parliamentarians have recently clashed over whether such is the case in Malaysia. In BN, although the Chief Whip rarely issues official directives, government MPs have tended to follow the party line. Most BN MPs who have contravened the government's stance in Parliament have been sanctioned. Recently, an official directive from the Prime Minister stated that the whip was always in force unless the Chief Whip or his deputy indicated otherwise.

== Controversy ==
In 2006, the resignation of Shahrir Abdul Samad (BN-Johor Bahru) as chairman of the Barisan Nasional Backbenchers Club (BNBBC) triggered a controversy over the nature of the whip and how it is enforced. Earlier in 2005, a Deputy Minister, S. Sothinathan, had been suspended for speaking in Parliament against the government's stand on the issue of the government's decision not to recognise degrees awarded by the Crimea State Medical University (CSMU). Later, two MPs who spoke in support of a motion made by the opposition regarding a corruption scandal related to the distribution of import permits were also sanctioned, receiving official warning letters. At the time, Najib said it was official BN policy to not support any motions brought by the opposition.

Then in May 2006, Shahrir spoke in support of a motion brought by Opposition Leader Lim Kit Siang of the Democratic Action Party (DAP) to refer an anonymous MP who allegedly attempted to influence the Melaka Customs and Excise Department to the House Rights and Privileges Committee. When the vote was held, Shahrir was the only government MP who supported the motion. He immediately left the house and called an impromptu press conference to announce his resignation as BNBBC Chair, saying that "Even though it was an Opposition motion, we should support it for its importance to MPs and the House." The Deputy Chair and the BNBBC asked Shahrir to rescind his resignation, but Shahrir insisted he would submit a letter of resignation to Najib, the Chief Whip. Later, Shahrir explained he had no choice but to resign "as I had breached the party's directive against supporting an Opposition motion."

Mohammad Said bin Yusof (BN-Jasin) then said he was the unnamed MP, but insisted he had done nothing wrong in asking for leniency in the case of one of his constituents, whose import of timber from Indonesia had been seized on what Said called a "technicality". Later, the BNBBC issued a statement, read by secretary Rosli Mat Hassan (BN-Dungun), which declared, "the unwritten rule that presently [makes] it mandatory for BN MPs to oppose any opposition motion regardless of merit [runs] counter to basic parliamentary practice and [infringes] on the duties of MPs". The BNBBC also said "However, we recognise, as in the case of the British House of Commons, the party Whip can compel MPs to vote along party lines in issues of serious importance, such as financial bills and vote of no-confidence as well as second readings of other important bills.... But in the absence of any direction from the Whip, the general rule is that MPs are to vote according to their conscience to serve their constituency and country." In light of this, they officially requested the permission of the executive to vote according to their conscience unless ordered otherwise by the Whip. Rosli then said the BNBBC would attempt to re-elect Shahrir as their Chair, despite Najib having accepted Shahrir's resignation.

However, the BNBBC later stated that Shahrir had been in the wrong for supporting a baseless motion, as the purview of the House Rights and Privileges Committee only extended to the misuse of Parliamentary privileges. Rosli also said Lim's motion ran counter to established Parliamentary process, as it was rushed through without written notice and a period of 24 hours being given to the Speaker to consider the motion. Shahrir himself later said he had "...made a mistake in regard to the parliamentary procedure involved. However, based on the political model, there was no mistake."

However, Prime Minister Abdullah Ahmad Badawi later issued a formal directive, making Rosli's "unwritten rule" official. The directive, released shortly after a United Malays National Organisation (UMNO – the leading party in BN) Supreme Council meeting, stated that MPs were required to follow the party line unless otherwise instructed. When the topic of other Commonwealth Parliaments was raised, Abdullah said that "We have our own democracy and we will follow it." The backbenchers indicated they would comply with the ruling, but said that counter to Abdullah's insinuation that he would have sacked Shahrir had he not resigned, they still considered Shahrir their chairman.

Nazri, the deputy Chief Whip, later explained that "The Whip is only relaxed when it is lifted by the chief or the deputy chief Whip. The question of allowing backbenchers to vote according to their conscience does not arise. It is also not right to say the Backbenchers Club does not come under the whip which is perpetually in force until otherwise." He also criticised Zaid Ibrahim (BN-Kota Baru), who had led a campaign to re-elect Shahrir, for citing other Commonwealth Parliaments as a rationale for allowing BN MPs to vote freely, and said that the BNBBC had unanimously accepted his explanation of the Whip's role. As an example of the relaxation of the Whip, Nazri cited the 2005 case of a motion brought by Salahuddin Ayub (PAS-Kubang Kerian) concerning the South Thailand insurgency: "Although no voting was involved, they could only speak in support of the motion because we gave them the green light." When asked about the possible re-election of Shahrir, Nazri said "it would have been a mockery of the disciplinary process" within BN.

== Remuneration ==
Whips and deputy whips of the recognized party received no salary apart from their pay as a parliamentarian.

== See also ==
- List of whips in the Dewan Rakyat
- Barisan Nasional Backbenchers Club
