= Abdul Rahman Mokhtar =

Malaysian politician

Abdul Rahman Mokhtar (22 March 1958 – 26 June 2013) was a Malaysian politician. He was Terengganu State Representative for Kuala Besut.

== Death ==
Mokhtar died of lung cancer on 26 June 2013 at the age of 55.
