= Nik Muhammad Zawawi Salleh =

Malaysian politician (born 1967)

Yang Berhormat Datuk Dr. Nik Muhammad Zawawi Salleh PMW PJK MP
- نئ محمد زواوي صالح
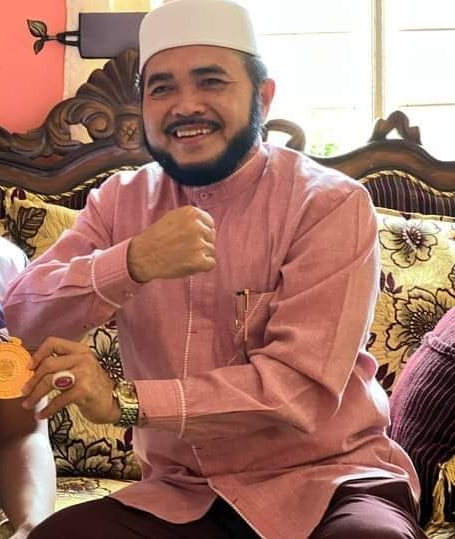

Deputy Minister of Agriculture and Food Industries II
- In office 30 August 2021 – 24 November 2022 Serving with Ahmad Hamzah (Deputy Minister of Agriculture and Food Industries I)
- Monarch: Abdullah
- Prime Minister: Ismail Sabri Yaakob
- Minister: Ronald Kiandee
- Preceded by: Che Abdullah Mat Nawi
- Succeeded by: Chan Foong Hin (Deputy Minister of Agriculture and Food Security)
- Constituency: Pasir Puteh

Chairman of the Farmers' Organisation Authority
- In office 8 April 2020 – 30 August 2021
- Minister: Ronald Kiandee
- Director General: Azulita Salim
- Preceded by: Mazlan Aliman
- Succeeded by: Che Abdullah Mat Nawi

Deputy Chairman of the Perikatan Nasional Government Backbenchers Club
- In office 16 May 2020 – 16 August 2021
- Monarch: Abdullah
- Prime Minister: Muhyiddin Yassin
- Chairman: Shahidan Kassim
- Preceded by: Position established
- Succeeded by: Position abolished

Dewan Ulamak Chief of the Malaysian Islamic Party
- In office 6 July 2019 – 2021
- President: Abdul Hadi Awang
- Deputy: Johari Mat
- Preceded by: Mahfodz Mohamed
- Succeeded by: Ahmad Yahaya

Member of the Malaysian Parliament for Pasir Puteh
- Incumbent
- Assumed office 9 May 2018
- Preceded by: Nik Mazian Nik Mohamad (PAS)
- Majority: 1,360 (2018); 29,109 (2022)

Member of the Terengganu State Legislative Assembly for Kuala Besut
- In office 29 November 1999 – 21 March 2004
- Preceded by: Che Ku Hashim Che Ku Mat (BN–UMNO)
- Succeeded by: Abdullah Che Muda (BN–UMNO)
- Majority: 487 (1999)

Faction represented in Dewan Rakyat
- 2018–2020: Malaysian Islamic Party
- 2020–: Perikatan Nasional

Faction represented in Terengganu State Legislative Assembly
- 1999–2004: Malaysian Islamic Party

Personal details
- Born: Nik Muhammad Zawawi bin Salleh; 17 March 1967 (age 59) Gong Kala, Pasir Puteh, Kelantan, Malaysia
- Citizenship: Malaysian
- Party: Malaysian Islamic Party (PAS)
- Other political affiliations: Barisan Alternatif (BA) (1999–2004); Pakatan Rakyat (PR) (2008–2015); Gagasan Sejahtera (GS) (2016–2020); Perikatan Nasional (PN) (since 2020)
- Education: Al-Azhar University; Al al-Bayt University
- Occupation: Politician

Nik Muhammad Zawawi bin Salleh (Jawi: نئ محمد زواوي بن صالح; born 17 March 1967) is a Malaysian politician who has served as the Member of Parliament (MP) for Pasir Puteh since May 2018. He served as Deputy Minister of Agriculture and Food Industries II in the Barisan Nasional (BN) administration under former Prime Minister Ismail Sabri Yaakob and former Minister Ronald Kiandee from August 2021 to the collapse of the BN administration in November 2022, Chairman of the Farmers' Organisation Authority (FOA), Deputy Chairman of the Perikatan Nasional Backbenchers Club (PNBBC) from 2020 to 2021 and Member of the Terengganu State Legislative Assembly (MLA) for Kuala Besut from November 1999 to March 2004. He is a member of the Malaysian Islamic Party (PAS), a component party of the Perikatan Nasional (PN) coalition. He also served as Dewan Ulamak Chief of PAS from July 2019 to 2021.

== Education ==
Obtained a Bachelor's degree from Usuluddin (Tafseer) from Al-Azhar University, Egypt in 1990. He later went on to study Master of Arts (M.A.) in Aqeedah & Philosophy from Al Al-Bayt University, Jordan. After earning his Master's degree in 1997, he returned to his homeland and served as a lecturer at Ismail Petra International Islamic College from 1998 to 1999. He completed his PhD at Universiti Kebangsaan Malaysia in the field of Preaching & Leadership.

== Election results ==
Terengganu State Legislative Assembly
Year	Constituency	Candidate	Votes	Pct	Opponent(s)	Votes	Pct	Ballots cast	Majority	Turnout
1999	N01 Kuala Besut	Nik Muhammad Zawawi Salleh (PAS)	4,426	52.91%	Wan Zakaria Wan Abd. Rahman (UMNO)	3,939	47.09%	8,609	487	82.89%
2004	N01 Kuala Besut	Nik Muhammad Zawawi Salleh (PAS)	4,307	40.48%	Abdullah Che Muda (UMNO)	6,334	59.52%	10,828	2,027	87.60%
2008	N01 Kuala Besut	Nik Muhammad Zawawi Salleh (PAS)	4,492	38.67%	A. Rahman Mokhtar (UMNO)	7,123	61.33%	12,140	2,631	85.61%

Parliament of Malaysia
Year	Constituency	Candidate	Votes	Pct	Opponent(s)	Votes	Pct	Ballots cast	Majority	Turnout
2018	P028 Pasir Puteh	Nik Muhammad Zawawi Salleh (PAS)	32,307	47.41%	Asyraf Wajdi Dusuki (UMNO)	30,947	45.41%	69,745	1,360	81.66%
2018	P028 Pasir Puteh	Nik Muhammad Zawawi Salleh (PAS)	32,307	47.41%	Kamarudin Mohd Noor (BERSATU)	4,896	7.18%	69,745	1,360	81.66%
2022	P028 Pasir Puteh	Nik Muhamamd Zawawi Salleh (PAS)	52,937	65.37%	Zawawi Othman (UMNO)	23,828	29.43%	82,228	29,109	71.62%
2022	P028 Pasir Puteh	Nik Muhamamd Zawawi Salleh (PAS)	52,937	65.37%	Muhammad Husain (AMANAH)	3,867	4.77%	82,228	29,109	71.62%
2022	P028 Pasir Puteh	Nik Muhamamd Zawawi Salleh (PAS)	52,937	65.37%	Wan Marzudi Wan Umar (PUTRA)	349	0.43%	82,228	29,109	71.62%

== Honours ==
=== Honours of Malaysia ===
- Malaysia
  - Recipient of the 17th Yang di-Pertuan Agong Installation Medal (2024)
- Federal Territory (Malaysia)
  - Commander of the Order of the Territorial Crown (PMW) – Datuk (2022)
- Terengganu
  - Recipient of the Meritorious Service Medal (PJK) (2002)
