= Semerak (state constituency) =

Kelantan constituency, Malaysia

Semerak (N31)
Kelantan constituency

State constituency
- Legislature: Kelantan State Legislative Assembly
MLA
Nor Sham Sulaiman
PN
- Constituency created: 1994
- First contested: 1995
- Last contested: 2023

Demographics
- Electors (2023): 26,781

Semerak is a state constituency in Kelantan, Malaysia, that has been represented in the Kelantan State Legislative Assembly.

The state constituency was first contested in 1995 and is mandated to return a single Assemblyman to the Kelantan State Legislative Assembly under the first-past-the-post voting system.

== Demographics ==
As of 2020, Semerak has a population of 33,188 people.

Ethnic breakdown of Semerak's electorate as of 2023
1. Malay (97.5%)
2. Other ethnicities (2.07%)
3. Chinese (0.43%)
4. Indian (0.03%)

== History ==
=== Polling districts ===
According to the Gazette issued on 30 March 2018, the Semerak constituency has a total of 10 polling districts.

State Constituency	Polling Districts	Code	Location
Semerak (N31)	Tok Bali	028/31/01	SK To'Bali
Semerak (N31)	Kampung Lembah	028/31/02	SK Kg Sepulau
Semerak (N31)	Gong Kulim	028/31/03	SK Kulim
Semerak (N31)	Bukit Tanah	028/31/04	SK Bukit Tanah
Semerak (N31)	Gong Manok	028/31/05	SK Gong Manak
Semerak (N31)	Pekan Cherang Ruku	028/31/06	SK Cherang Raku
Semerak (N31)	Dalam Rhu	028/31/07	SK Dalam Ru
Semerak (N31)	Gong Tapang	028/31/08	SMA Dato' Ismail
Semerak (N31)	Pulau Lima	028/31/09	SMK Sungai Petai
Semerak (N31)	Sungai Petai	028/31/10	SK Sungai Petai

=== Representation history ===
Members of the Legislative Assembly for Semerak
Assembly	No	Years	Member	Party
Constituency created from Cherang Raku
9th	N30	1995–1997	Sulaiman Ahmad	PAS
9th	N30	1997–1999	Kamarudin Md Nor	BN (UMNO)
10th	N30	1999–2004	Hussin Awang	PAS
11th	N31	2004–2008	Kamarudin Mohd Nor	BN (UMNO)
12th	N31	2008–2013	Wan Hassan Wan Ibrahim	PR (PAS)
13th	N31	2013–2018	Zawawi Othman	BN (UMNO)
14th	N31	2018–2020	Wan Hassan Wan Ibrahim	PAS
14th	N31	2020–2023	Wan Hassan Wan Ibrahim	PN (PAS)
15th	N31	2023–present	Nor Sham Sulaiman	PN (PAS)

== Election results ==
Kelantan state election, 2023
Party	Candidate	Votes	%	∆%
PAS	Nor Sham Sulaiman	11,531	66.91	▲17.85
BN	Marshella Ali	5,703	33.09	▼12.22
Total valid votes		17,234	100.00	
Total rejected ballots		110		
Unreturned ballots		24		
Turnout		17,694	64.86	▼18.67
Registered electors		26,781		
Majority		5,828	33.82	▲30.07
PAS hold		Swing		

Kelantan state election, 2018
Party	Candidate	Votes	%	∆%
PAS	Wan Hassan Wan Ibrahim	8,278	49.06	▲2.16
BN	Zawawi Othman	7,646	45.31	▼7.79
PKR	Wan Marzudi Wan Omar	950	5.63	▲5.63
Total valid votes		16,874	100.00	
Total rejected ballots		260		
Unreturned ballots		149		
Turnout		17,283	83.53	▼4.77
Registered electors		20,690		
Majority		632	3.75	▼2.45
PAS gain from BN		Swing		?

Kelantan state election, 2013
Party	Candidate	Votes	%	∆%
BN	Zawawi Othman	8,444	53.10	▲6.28
PAS	Wan Hassan Wan Ibrahim	7,459	46.90	▼6.28
Total valid votes		15,903	100.00	
Total rejected ballots		166		
Unreturned ballots		37		
Turnout		16,129	88.30	▲3.31
Registered electors		18,269		
Majority		985	6.20	▼0.16
BN gain from PAS		Swing		?

Kelantan state election, 2008
Party	Candidate	Votes	%	∆%
PAS	Wan Hassan Wan Ibrahim	6,943	53.18	▲6.22
BN	Muhamad Ab. Rahman	6,112	46.82	▼6.22
Total valid votes		13,055	100.00	
Total rejected ballots		171		
Unreturned ballots		19		
Turnout		13,245	84.99	▲1.58
Registered electors		15,584		
Majority		831	6.36	▲0.28
PAS gain from BN		Swing		?

Kelantan state election, 2004
Party	Candidate	Votes	%	∆%
BN	Kamaruddin Mohd Nor	6,095	53.04	▲9.89
PAS	Hussin Awang	5,396	46.96	▼9.89
Total valid votes		11,491	100.00	
Total rejected ballots		181		
Unreturned ballots		0		
Turnout		11,672	83.41	▲1.89
Registered electors		13,993		
Majority		699	6.08	▼7.62
BN gain from PAS		Swing		?

Kelantan state election, 1999
Party	Candidate	Votes	%	∆%
PAS	Hussin Awang	6,118	56.85	▲11.27
BN	Jelani @ Mohammed Jailani Jaafar	4,643	43.15	▼10.15
Total valid votes		10,761	100.00	
Total rejected ballots		159		
Unreturned ballots		7		
Turnout		10,927	81.52	▲2.45
Registered electors		13,404		
Majority		1,475	13.70	▲11.06
PAS gain from BN		Swing		?

Malaysian general by-election, 11 August 1997 Upon the death of incumbent, Sulaiman Ahmad
Party	Candidate	Votes	%	∆%
BN	Kamarudin Mohd Nor	5,370	53.30	▲5.08
PAS	Wan Mohd Fauzi Husain	4,592	45.58	▼5.28
KITA	Mohd Din Nizamdin	27	1.12	▲0.20
Total valid votes		9,989	100.00	
Total rejected ballots		85		
Unreturned ballots		0		
Turnout		10,074	82.42	
Registered electors		12,222		
Majority		778	7.7	
BN gain from PAS		Swing		?

Kelantan state election, 1995
Party	Candidate	Votes	%
PAS	Sulaiman Ahmad	4,784	50.86
BN	Ismail Awang	4,536	48.22
KITA	Musa Saleh	86	0.92
Total valid votes		9,406	100.00
Total rejected ballots		222	
Unreturned ballots		1	
Turnout		9,629	79.07
Registered electors		12,178	
Majority		248	2.64
This was a new constituency created.
