= Malayan Declaration of Independence =

1957 document establishing an independent Federation of Malaya

Declaration of Independence
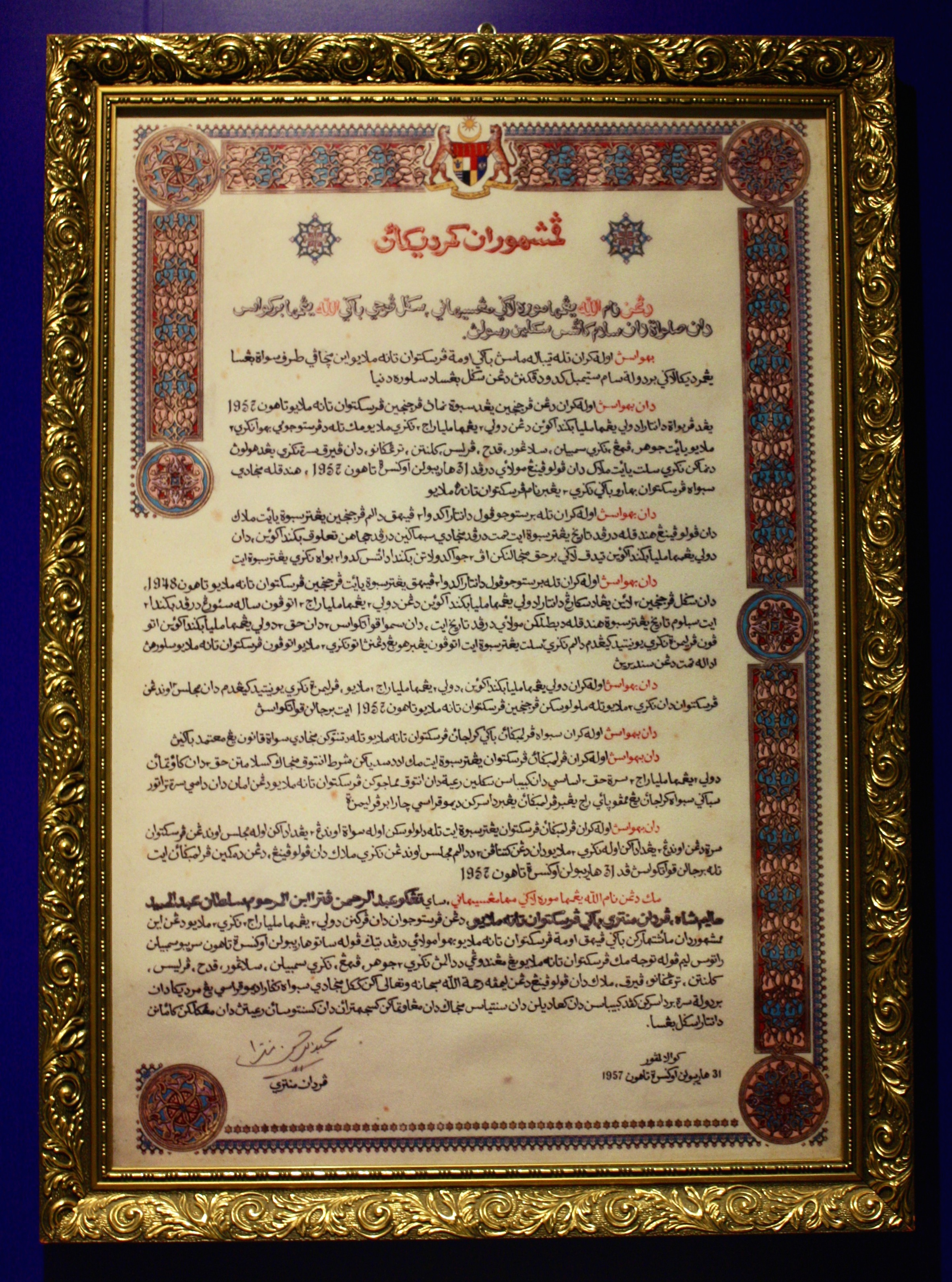
- Malay version of the declaration

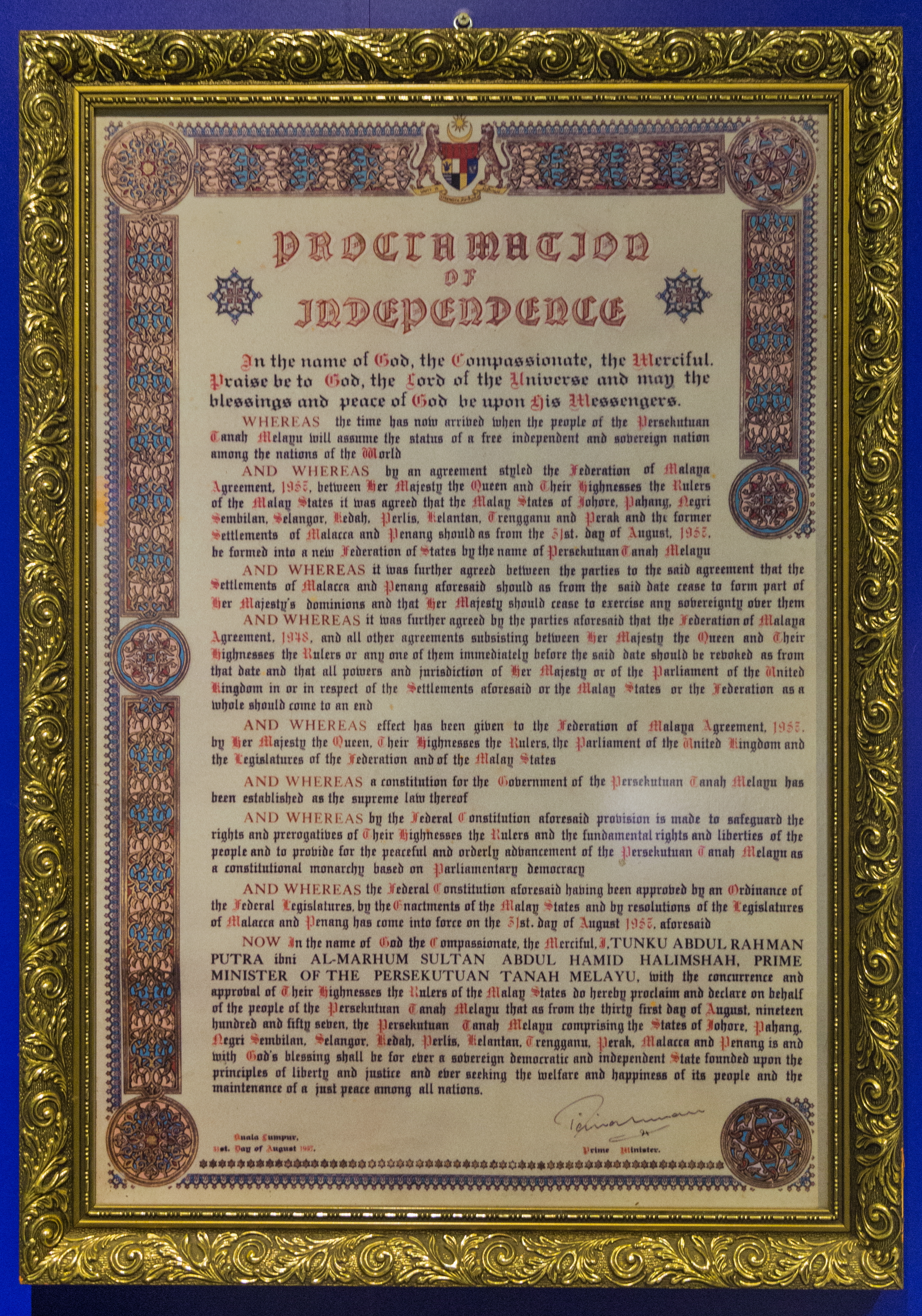
- English version of the declaration
- Date effective: 31 August 1957; 69 years ago
- Location: National Archives of Malaysia
- Signatories: Tunku Abdul Rahman
- Purpose: To announce the independence of Malaya from United Kingdom

The Malayan Declaration of Independence (Malay: Pemasyhuran Kemerdekaan Tanah Melayu, Jawi: ڤمشهوران کمرديکاءن تانه ملايو), was officially proclaimed on Saturday, 31 August 1957, by Tunku Abdul Rahman, the first chief minister of the Federation of Malaya. In a ceremony held at the Merdeka Stadium, the proclamation document was read out at exactly 09:30 a.m. in the presence of thousands of Malayan citizens, Malay Rulers and foreign dignitaries. The proclamation acknowledges the establishment of an independent and democratic Malaya, which came into effect on the termination of the British protectorate over nine Malay states and the end of British colonial rule in two Straits Settlements, Malacca and Penang.

The document of the declaration was signed by Tunku Abdul Rahman, who was appointed as the nation's first prime minister. The event is celebrated annually in Malaysia with national day Hari Merdeka.

== Date of Independence ==
The date for Federation of Malaya's Independence on 31 August 1957 was determined after Tunku Abdul Rahman, Haji Sulaiman Palestine, Haji Ahmad Badawi, and several other UMNO leaders sought the views of Syeikh Abdullah Fahim, a notable Tuan Guru from Kepala Batas, Penang.

According to Syeikh Abdullah Fahim, if the British would not grant independence to Malaya on 31 August 1957, the next fitting date should be 31 August 1962. 31 August 1957 was referred by Syeikh Abdullah Fahim as am khair atana (عام خير اتانا) in Arabic which means 'Good Year Has Come to Us'. It was confirmed in a February 1956 Alliance rally in Malacca after the Tunku had just arrived from the United Kingdom.

== Declaration ceremony ==
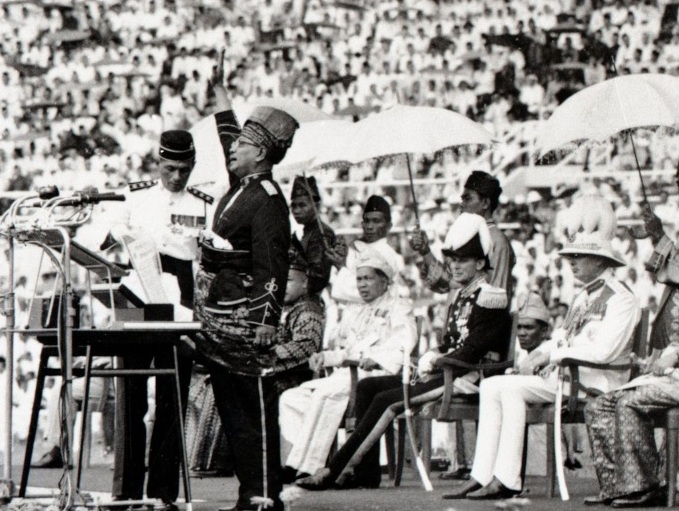
Tunku Abdul Rahman chanting "freedom!" when signing the Malayan Declaration of Independence in 1957.

On the night of 30 August 1957, crowds gathered at the Royal Selangor Club Padang in Kuala Lumpur to witness the handover of power from the British. Prime Minister-designate Tunku Abdul Rahman arrived at 11:58 p.m. and joined members of the Alliance Party's youth divisions in observing two minutes of darkness. On the stroke of midnight, the lights were switched back on, and the Union Flag in the square was lowered as the royal anthem God Save The Queen was played. The new Flag of Malaya was raised as the national anthem Negaraku was played. This was followed by seven chants of "Merdeka (freedom)" by the crowd. Tunku Abdul Rahman later gave a speech hailing the ceremony as "greatest moment in the life of the Malayan people". Before giving the address to the crowd, he was given a necklace by representatives of the Alliance Party youth in honour of this great occasion in history, with a map of Malaya inscribed on it. The event ended at 1 a.m.

On the morning of 31 August 1957, the festivities moved to the newly completed Merdeka Stadium. More than 20,000 people witnessed the ceremony, which began at 9:30 a.m. Those in attendance included rulers of the Malay states, foreign dignitaries, members of the federal cabinet, and citizens. The Queen's representative, the Duke of Gloucester presented Tunku Abdul Rahman with the instrument of independence. Tunku then proceeded to read the declaration, which culminated in the chanting of "Merdeka!" seven times with the crowd joining in. The ceremony continued with the raising of the National Flag of Malaya accompanied by the national anthem being played by a military band and a 21-gun salute, followed by an azan call and a thanksgiving prayer in honour of this occasion.

The day followed with the solemn installation of the first Yang di-Pertuan Agong, Tuanku Abdul Rahman of Negeri Sembilan, at Jalan Ampang, and the first installation banquet in his honour in the evening followed by a beating retreat performance and a fireworks display. Sports events and other events marked the birth of the new nation.

== The document ==
The original declaration was written on a 750mm by 500mm goatskin (vellum) in traditional Malay manuscript style and decorated by coloured filigree carvings, with its blue colour derived from lapis lazuli gem powder; its red colour sourced from natural materials; and its gold colour acquired from pure 24-carat gold. Important parts of the text were also written in red, and the borders of the document was inlaid with 100% gold leaf.

The content of the declaration was drafted by Ibrahim Mahmood with the help of several other Malay nationalist figures, such as Senu Abdul Rahman, while the text was handwritten by a Kelantanese scribe. The design of the documents were handled by a team of 10 artists from the Department of Survey and Mapping, who received the instruction to prepare for the declaration document in June 1957. The team first produced the drawings on a larger scale, then photographed and reduced them onto glass negatives at a smaller scale, followed by some touch up, a process which was repeated until achieving the intended final sizes. Mirrors were also used to check for symmetry and alignment of the line drawings. The team also took inspiration from traditional woodcarving motifs when designing the document's borders.

The declaration was produced in two versions, one in Malay with Jawi script, the other in English. Official copies of the declaration was also published in Chinese and Tamil, making the declaration officially available in a total of four languages. Copies of the declaration in four languages were distributed to all village heads and local community leaders throughout the nation during the independence.

The Malayan survey department produced a total of eight official handdrawn copies of the declaration. One of the 10-person designing team, Yap Kok Sun, a soldier from the 1st Battalion of Manchester Regiment who was recruited into the department in 1956 and in charged of the document's watermarks and line details, was persuaded by his European superior to sign his initial "K.S. Yap" onto the back of the document, although reluctantly.

Currently, the original documents of the declaration are being stored and preserved by the National Archives of Malaysia since 1958 or 1959, and have since then undergone two conservation and encapsulation process.

=== Text ===
The following is the full text of the declaration, in Malay (in Jawi script) and in English.

| Malay in Jawi | English |
|---|---|
| دڠن نام الله يڠمها موره لاݢي مڠسيهاني⹁ سݢالا ڤوجي باݢي الله يڠ مها برکواس دان صلواة دان سلام کاءتس سکالين رسولڽ. | In the name of God, the Compassionate, the Merciful. Praise be to God, the Lord of the Universe and may the blessings and peace of God be upon His Messengers. |
| بهواساڽ اوليه کران تله تيباله ماسڽ باݢي اومة ڤرسکتوان تانه ملايو اين منچاڤي طرف سواة بڠسا يڠمرديکا لاݢي بردولة سام ستيمبل کدودقکنڽ دڠن سݢل بڠسا دسلوره دنيا. | Whereas the time has now arrived when the people of the Persekutuan Tanah Melayu will assume the status of a free independent and sovereign nation among the nations of the World. |
| دان بهواسڽ اوله کران دڠن ڤرجنجين يڠدسبوة نماڽ ڤرجنجين ڤرسکتوان تانه ملايو تاهون 1957 يڠدڤربواة دانتارا دولي يڠمها مليا بݢندا کوءين دڠن دولي٢ يڠ مها مليا راج٢ نݢري ملايو مک تله دڤرستوجوءي بهاوا نݢري٢ ملايو ياءيت جوهر⹁ ڤهڠ⹁ نݢري سمبيلن⹁ سلاڠور⹁ قدح⹁ ڤرليس⹁ کلنتن⹁ ترڠݢانو⹁ دان ڤيرق سرة نݢري يڠدهولوڽ دنماکن نݢري سلت ياءيت ملاک دان ڤولو ڤينڠ مولاءي درڤد 31 هاريبولن اوݢس‌ة تاهون 1957⹁ هندقله منجادي سبواه ڤرسکتوان بهارو باݢي نݢري٢ يڠ برنام ڤرسکتوان تانه ملايو. | And Whereas by an agreement styled the Federation of Malaya Agreement, 1957, between Her Majesty the Queen and Their Highnesses, the Rulers of the Malay States, it was agreed that the Malay states of Johore, Pahang, Negri Sembilan, Selangor, Kedah, Perlis, Kelantan, Trengganu and Perak and the former Settlements of Malacca and Penang should as from the 31st. day of August, 1957, be formed into a new Federation of States by the name of Persekutuan Tanah Melayu, |
| دان بهواسڽ اوله کران تله برستوجو ڤول دانتارا کدوا٢ ڤيهق دالم ڤرجنجين يڠترسبوة ياءيت ملاک دان ڤولو ڤينڠ هندقله درڤد تاريخ يڠترسبوة ايت تمت درڤد منجادي سبهاݢين درڤد ججاهن تعلوق بݢندا کوءين دان دولي يڠمها مليا بݢندا کوءين تيدق لاݢي برحق منجالنکن اڤ٢ جوا کدولاتن بݢندا داءتس کدوا٢ بواه نݢري يڠترسبوة ايت. | And Whereas it was further agreed between the parties to the said agreement that the Settlements of Malacca and Penang aforesaid should as from the said date cease to form part of Her Majesty’s dominions and that Her Majesty should cease to exercise any sovereignty over them. |
| دان بهواسڽ اوله کران تله برستوجو ڤول دانتارا کدوا٢ ڤيهق يڠترسبوة ياءيت ڤرجنجين ڤرسکتوان تانه ملايو تاهون 1948⹁ دان سݢل ڤرجنجين٢ لاءين يڠاد سکارڠ دانتارا دولي يڠمها مليا بهندا کوءين دڠن دولي٢ يڠمها مليا راج٢ اتو ڤون ساله سئورڠ درڤد بݢندا٢ ايت سبلوم تاريخ يڠترسبوة هندقله دبطلکن مولاءي درڤد تاريخ ايت⹁ دان سموا قواتکواس٢ دان حق٢ دولي يڠمها مليا بݢندا کوءين اتو ڤون ڤرليمن‌ة نݢري يونيتيد کيڠدم دالم نݢري٢ سلت يڠترسبوة ايت اتو ڤون يڠبرهوبڠ دڠنڽ اتو نݢري٢ ملايو اتو ڤون ڤرسکتوان تانه ملايو سلورهڽ اداله تمت دڠن سنديريڽ. | And Whereas it was further agreed by the parties aforesaid that the Federation of Malaya Agreement, 1948, and all other agreements subsisting between Her Majesty the Queen and Their Highnesses the Rulers or any one of them immediately before the said date should be revoked as from that date and that all powers and jurisdiction of Her Majesty or of the Parliament of the United Kingdom in or in respect of the Settlements aforesaid or the Malay States or the Federation as a whole should come to an end. |
| دان بهواسڽ اوله کران دولي يڠمها مليا بݢندا کوءين⹁ دولي٢ يڠمها مليا راج٢ ملايو⹁ ڤرليمن‌ة نݢري يونيتيد کيڠدم دان مجلس٢ اوندڠن ڤرسکتوان دان نݢري٢ ملايو تله ملولوسکن ڤرجنجين ڤرسکتوان تانه ملايو تاهون 1957 ايت برجالن قواتکواسڽ. | And Whereas effect has been given to the Federation of Malaya Agreement, 1957, by Her Majesty the Queen, Their Highnesses the Rulers, the Parliament of the United Kingdom and the Legislatures of the Federation and of the Malay States, |
| دان بهواسڽ اوله کران سبواه ڤرلمبݢاءن باݢي کراجاءن ڤرسکتوان تانه ملايو تله دتنتوکن منجادي سواة قانون يڠ معتمد باݢيڽ. | And Whereas a constitution for the Government of the Persekutuan Tanah Melayu has been established as the supreme law thereof, |
| دان بهواسڽ اوله کران ڤرلمبݢاءن ڤرسکتوان يڠ ترسبوة ايت مک اد دسدياکن شرط انتوق منجاݢ کسلامتن حق٢ دان کاءوتماءن دولي٢ يڠمها مليا راج٢ سرة حق٢ اساسي دان کبيباسن سکلين رعية دان انتوق مماجوکن ڤرسکتوان تانه ملايو دڠن امان دان دامي سرة تراتور سباݢي سبواه کراجاءن يڠ ممڤوڽاءي راج يڠبرڤرلمبݢاءن يڠبرداسرکن ديموقراسي چارا برڤرليمن‌ة. | And Whereas by the Federal Constitution aforesaid provision is made to safeguard the rights and prerogatives of Their Highnesses the Rulers and the fundamental rights and liberties of the people and to provide for the peaceful and orderly advancement of the Persekutuan Tanah Melayu as a constitutional monarchy based on Parliamentary democracy, |
| دان بهواسڽ اوله کران ڤرلمبݢاءن ڤرسکتوان يڠ ترسبوة ايت تله دلولوسکن اوله سواة اوندڠ٢ يڠداداکن اوله مجلس اوندڠن ڤرسکتوان سرة دڠن اوندڠ٢ يڠداداکن اوله نݢري٢ ملايو دان دڠن کتتاڤن٢ ددالم مجلس اوندڠن نݢري ملاک دان ڤولو ڤينڠ⹁ دڠن دمکين ڤرلمباݢاءن ايت تله برجالن قواتکواسڽ ڤد 31 هاريبولن اوݢس‌ة تاهون 1957. | And Whereas, the Federal Constitution aforesaid having been approved by an Ordinance of the Federal Legislatures, by the Enactments of the Malay States and by resolutions of the Legislatures of Malacca and Penang has come into force on the 31st. day of August 1957, aforesaid. |
| مک دڠن نام الله يڠمها موره لاݢي مها مڠسيهاني⹁ ساي تڠکو عبدالرحمن ڤترا ابن المرحوم سلطان عبدالحميد حاليم شاه⹁ ڤردان منتري باݢي ڤرسکتوان تانه ملايو⹁ دڠن ڤرستوجوان دان ڤرکنن دولي٢ يڠمها مليا راج٢ نݢري٢ ملايو دڠن اين ممشهور دان ⹁ماءشتهارکن باݢي ڤيهق اومة ڤرسکتوان تانه ملايو بهوا مولاءي درڤد تيݢ ڤوله ساتو هاريبولن اوݢس‌ة تاهون سريبو سمبيلن راتوس ليم ڤوله توجه مک ڤرسکتوان تانه ملايو يڠ مڠندوڠي ددالمڽ نݢري٢ جوهر⹁ ڤهڠ⹁ نݢري سمبيلن⹁ سلاڠور⹁ قدح⹁ ڤرليس⹁ کلنتن⹁ ترڠݢانو⹁ ڤيرق⹁ ملاک دان ڤولو ڤينڠ دڠن ليمڤه رحمة الله سبحانه وتعالى اکن ککل منجادي سبواه نݢارا ديموقراسي يڠ مرديکا دان بردولة سرة برداسرکن کڤد کبيباسن دان کعديلن دان سنتياس منجاݢ دان مڠاوتماکن کسجهتراءن دان کسنتوساءن رعيتڽ دان مڠکلکن کاءمانن دانتارا سݢل بڠسا. | Now, In the name of God the Compassionate, the Merciful, I, Tunku Abdul Rahman Putra ibni Al-Marhum Sultan Abdul Hamid Halim Shah, Prime Minister of the Persekutuan Tanah Melayu, with the concurrence and approval of Their Highnesses the Rulers of the Malay States do hereby proclaim and declare on behalf of the people of the Persekutuan Tanah Melayu that as from the thirty first day of August, of the year nineteen hundred and fifty seven, the Persekutuan Tanah Melayu comprising of the States of Johore, Pahang, Negri Sembilan, Selangor, Kedah, Perlis, Kelantan, Trengganu, Perak, Malacca and Penang is and with God's blessing and grace, shall be for ever a sovereign, democratic and independent State founded upon the principles of liberty and justice and ever seeking the welfare and happiness of its people and the maintenance of a just peace among all nations. |

== See also ==
- Federation of Malaya Independence Act 1957
- Malaysia Agreement
- Hari Merdeka (Independence Day)
- United Nations Security Council Resolution 125
- Proclamation of Malaysia
