= Abdullah Ahmad Badawi =

Prime Minister of Malaysia from 2003 to 2009 (1939–2025)

Yang Amat Berbahagia Tun Abdullah Ahmad Badawi DK I (Johor) DK (Kelantan) DK I (Pahang) DK I (Brunei) DUK SMN SPMS SUMZ SSSJ SPSA SSAP SPNS DUPN DGPN SPDK DUNM SUMW DP DSSA DMPN DJN KMN AMN
- عبد الله احمد بدوي
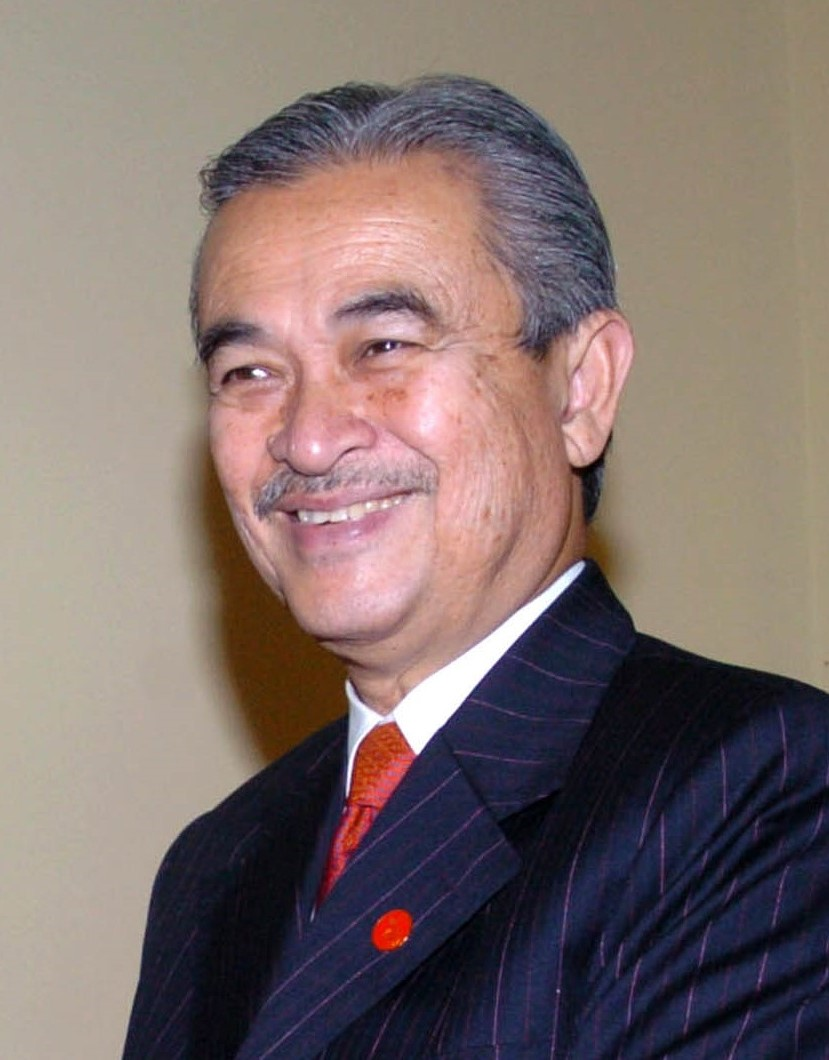
- Abdullah in 2006

5th Prime Minister of Malaysia
- In office 31 October 2003 – 2 April 2009
- Monarchs: Sirajuddin; Mizan Zainal Abidin
- Deputy: Najib Razak
- Preceded by: Mahathir Mohamad
- Succeeded by: Najib Razak

6th President of the United Malays National Organisation (ex officio: Chairman of Barisan Nasional)
- In office 31 October 2003 – 3 April 2009
- Deputy: Najib Razak
- Preceded by: Mahathir Mohamad
Succeeded by	Najib Razak	
Ministerial portfolios
1978–1980	Parliamentary Secretary of Federal Territories
1980–1981	Deputy Minister of Federal Territories
1981–1984	Minister in the Prime Minister's Department (Note: Minister without Portfolio in 1981 until 1982 and Minister in the Prime Minister's Department from 1982 afterwards after 1982 Malaysian general election.)
1984–1986	Minister of Education
1986–1987	Minister of Defence
1991–1999	Minister of Foreign Affairs
1999–2004	Minister of Home Affairs
1999–2003	Deputy Prime Minister
2003–2008	Minister of Finance
2004–2008	Minister of Internal Security
2008–2009	Minister of Defence
Other roles
2003–2006	Secretary General of the Non-Aligned Movement
Faction represented in Dewan Rakyat
1978–2013	Barisan Nasional

Personal details
- Born: Abdullah bin Ahmad Badawi; 26 November 1939 Bayan Lepas, Penang, Straits Settlements
- Died: 14 April 2025 (aged 85) Institut Jantung Negara, Kuala Lumpur, Malaysia
- Resting place: Makam Pahlawan, Masjid Negara, Kuala Lumpur
- Party: UMNO (1964–2025)
- Other political affiliations: Alliance (1964–1973); Barisan Nasional (1974–2025)
- Height: 1.65 m (5 ft 5 in)
- Spouses: Endon Mahmood (m. 1965; died 2005) Jeanne Abdullah (m. 2007)
- Relations: Syeikh Abdullah Fahim (grandfather); Khairy Jamaluddin (son-in-law)
- Children: 4 (including Nori) (Note: 2 biological children, Kamaluddin Abdullah and Nori Abdullah, and 2 stepchildren from the second marriage with Jeanne Abdullah, which are Nadiah Kimie Othman and Nadene Kimie Othman)
- Education: Bukit Mertajam High School; Methodist Boys School
- Alma mater: University of Malaya (BA); National Institute of Public Administration (DPA)
- Occupation: Politician; civil servant
- Awards: Full list

Abdullah bin Ahmad Badawi (Jawi: عبد الله بن احمد بدوي, Malay pronunciation: [/ʌbˈdʊlɑː ˈɑːhməd bɑːˈdɑːwi/]; 26 November 1939 – 14 April 2025), also known as Pak Lah, (Note: Pak is a respectful term derived from the colloquial Malay word bapak (meaning "father" or "sir"), while Lah is taken from his given name, Abdullah.) was a Malaysian politician and civil servant who served as the fifth prime minister of Malaysia from 2003 to 2009. A member of UMNO, he was the party's president from 2004 to 2009 and led the ruling Barisan Nasional coalition during his premiership.

Born in Bayan Lepas, Penang, Abdullah was educated at the University of Malaya and began his career in the Malaysian civil service before entering politics in 1978 as the Member of Parliament for Kepala Batas, a seat he held until 2013. He later served in several ministerial portfolios, including education, defence and foreign affairs, before being appointed deputy prime minister under Mahathir Mohamad.

Abdullah assumed the premiership following Mahathir's resignation in 2003 and initially enjoyed strong public support, promoting institutional reform, anti-corruption measures, and a vision of moderate Islam through his concept of Islam Hadhari. His administration focused on economic development and regional growth initiatives, but his later years in office were marked by economic challenges, declining public approval, and criticism over governance and media freedom. These factors contributed to significant losses for the ruling coalition in the 2008 Malaysian general election, after which he stepped down in 2009.

== Early life and education ==
Abdullah was born on 26 November 1939 in Kampung Perlis, Bayan Lepas, Penang, into a prominent religious family. His paternal grandfather, Syeikh Abdullah Badawi Fahim, was of Hadrami descent and was a respected religious scholar and nationalist. He was among the founding members of Hizbul Muslimin, which later evolved into the Pan-Malaysian Islamic Party (PAS), and served as the first Mufti of Penang following Malaysia’s independence.

His father, Ahmad Badawi, was a religious teacher and active member of UMNO. His mother, Kailan Haji Hassan, died in Kuala Lumpur on 2 February 2004 at the age of 80. Abdullah's maternal grandfather, Ha Su-chiang (simplified Chinese: 哈苏璋; traditional Chinese: 哈蘇璋; pinyin: Hā Sūzhāng), also known as Hassan Salleh, was an Utsul Muslim from Sanya, Hainan.

Abdullah received his early education at Permatang Bertam Primary School, Kepala Batas from 1947. Then, he continued his secondary education at Bukit Mertajam High School and later attended Methodist Boys' School, Penang for his sixth form. In 1964, he graduated from the University of Malaya with a Bachelor of Arts degree in Islamic Studies.

== Civil service (1964–1978) ==
After graduating from the University of Malaya, he joined the Malaysian Administrative and Diplomatic Corps (PTD) in 1964. He served as Director of Youth's Ministry Department at the Ministry of Youth and Sport as well as member of the National Operations Council (MAGERAN). He resigned in 1978 to become a member of parliament for his constituency of Kepala Batas in northern Seberang Perai (which had also been represented by his father).

== Early political career (1978–2003) ==
After Abdullah was elected as the Member of Parliament (MP) for Kepala Batas in 1978 general election, he served as the parliamentary secretary to the minister of federal territories from 1978 until 1980 and deputy minister of federal territories from 1980 until 1981. Brought on as a minister without portfolio in 1981, he was responsible for the implementation of the Look East policy.

When a dispute erupted within the United Malays National Organisation (UMNO) divided it into two camps, colloquially known as 'Team A' and 'Team B', comprising Mahathir loyalists and supporters of former finance minister Tengku Razaleigh Hamzah and former deputy prime minister Musa Hitam, Abdullah was removed from his position as defence minister. However, he did not join the now-defunct Semangat 46 (Spirit 46) splinter party set up by Tengku Razaleigh. Instead, Mahathir brought Abdullah into the pro tem committee of the reconstituted UMNO (Baru) or New UMNO as its vice-president upon the party's founding in February 1988. During a cabinet reshuffle in 1991, Mahathir brought him back into government as the minister of foreign affairs. Despite losing the vice presidency in the 1993 UMNO elections, he remained in government.

In January 1999, Abdullah was appointed acting deputy president in UMNO and deputy prime minister, replacing Anwar Ibrahim in both roles after the latter was removed removed from government, expelled from UMNO, and arrested, sparking the Reformasi movement. Chosen by Mahathir as his candidate for deputy president in the 2000 United Malays National Organisation leadership election, Abdullah was perceived as a political lightweight that did not possess enough political influence or support to challenge Mahathir's preeminence within the party. This was attributed to his refusal to engage in money politics, which prevented him from building a base. The election was held under rules that prohibited anyone else from contesting the positions of president and deputy president.

== Prime Minister (2003–2009) ==
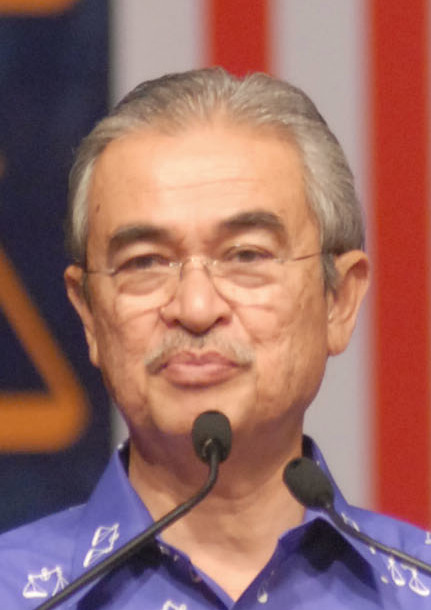
- Abdullah in 2008
- Abdullah Ahmad Badawi; 31 October 2003 – 2 April 2009
- Monarchs: Sirajuddin; Mizan Zainal Abidin
- Prime Minister: Abdullah Ahmad Badawi
- Cabinet: Abdullah I; Abdullah II
- Party: BN–UMNO
- Election: 2004; 2008
- Seat: Seri Perdana

=== Domestic affairs ===
Becoming prime minister after Mahathir's resignation in October 2003, Abdullah entered office espousing a populist reform agenda. Some of his first acts in government were to shelve several mega-projects initiated under Mahathir that were perceived as wasteful and associated with political corruption, establish a royal commission to investigate allegations of corruption in the police force and propose reform, and introduce a code of ethics requiring cabinet ministers and elected representatives to declare their assets. Multiple anti-corruption investigations were also launched against government officials and businessmen that resulted in arrests. He also broke with past practice and appointed professionals to head government-linked companies instead of politicians, calling for an end to the culture of the "iron rice bowl" and towards a culture rewarding performance.

Abdullah's personal popularity, as well as a nonconfrontational style of government that was favourably compared to his predecessor's perceived authoritarianism, delivered him a resounding victory in the 2004 Malaysian general election, where his Barisan Nasional coalition secured 198 out of 219 available seats. However, observers noted that redelineation exercises the previous year under Mahathir also played a factor in the scale of victory.

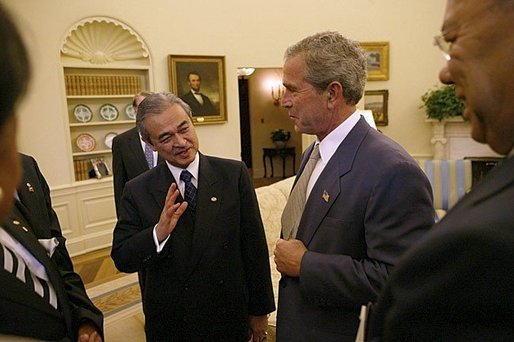
Abdullah with United States President George W. Bush at the White House in 2004

The momentum of reform slowed after the 2004 general election, and Malaysia's ranking in that year's Corruption Perceptions Index fell two places from 37th to 39th. The continued prevalence of money politics in the 2004 UMNO election, coupled with an abortive attempt to appoint Abdullah's son-in-law, Khairy Jamaluddin, to head a government-linked company cast a shadow on the former's reform agenda, which faltered with the defeat of his supporters in the party's leadership election by conservative elements; the party itself was resistant to the kind of reform Abdullah wanted to institute as its organisation and the loyalties of its middle- and lower-rung leaders relied on political patronage that took the form of government contracts and development funds.

Instead, Abdullah shifted towards attempting a reform of political culture within the country, introducing the concept of Islam Hadhari, a moderate-to-progressive interpretation of Islam that called for religious tolerance and modernity. Crucially, it appropriated what had been the opposition Malaysian Islamic Party (PAS)'s themes of social justice and distributive equality that had helped them secure electoral gains against UMNO in the 1999 Malaysian general election.

On the economic front, Malaysia experienced steady economic growth throughout Abdullah's years in office, but inflation remained a persistent issue. Under his administration, the Malaysian ringgit's peg to the US Dollar was ended in 2005. The agricultural sector, traditionally neglected in favour of the industrial and services industries, received significant investment from Abdullah's government. When rising costs led to the government lowering petrol subsidies in 2006, street protests were launched in response. These were violently dispersed by riot police. Further plans for restructuring government subsidies in the face of rising fuel prices internationally also faced criticism as Malaysia was at the time a net exporter of petroleum and natural gas. The Ninth Malaysia Plan launched by Abdullah covering government expenditure from 2006 to 2010 retained much of the costly and divisive positive discriminatory measures introduced by the New Economic Policy.

By 2007, a slew of scandals had left a severe dent in public confidence in Abdullah's premiership. These included the acquittal of businessman Eric Chia, among the first to be arrested in the anti-corruption drive at the beginning of Abdullah's premiership, the murder of Shaariibuugiin Altantuyaa by two members of the police, which implicated deputy prime minister Najib Razak, as well as corruption allegations leveled against government ministers, the anti-corruption agency chief, inspector general of police, and the chief justice, among others. Abdullah himself was also accused of engaging in nepotism. Mahathir had also began to openly criticise Abdullah after the latter cancelled a major infrastructure project in 2006, one of the last decided upon by Mahathir before he left office, going as far as saying he regretted choosing Abdullah as his successor. Conversely, his administration's decision to resume a number of high-profile mega-projects such as the Bakun Dam elicited public criticism in the face of rising costs of living.

Malay nationalist sentiment was also played up by leading UMNO politicians such as Hishammuddin Hussein, who infamously brandished the keris, a traditional dagger with cultural significance in three successive UMNO general assemblies, which was interpreted by non-Malay communities as a threat not to encroach on the special position of Malays. The continued deterioration of relations between the country's ethnic and religious groups coincided with a rise in Islamist sentiment in the country that the government promoted, with Abdullah openly referring to the country as an "Islamic state".

The government at this time was also rocked by two successive large-scale public protests, the first for free-and-fair elections and the second by the country's Indian minority against racial discrimination. Both were dispersed with the use of tear gas and chemical-laced water cannons by armed riot police. As many as 12 members of the opposition were also arrested for their participation in the protests which were deemed illegal.

These events precipitated Barisan Nasional's poor showing in the 2008 Malaysian general election held in March, where the ruling coalition lost its two-thirds majority in parliament and control over four state governments to a united opposition riding on popular discontent. Abdullah and his government's reputation was further damaged in September that year when it invoked the Internal Security Act to arrest opposition parliamentarian Teresa Kok, online blogger Raja Petra Kamarudin, and journalist Tan Hoon Cheng, which prompted law minister Zaid Ibrahim to resign in opposition.

Faced with an broadly liberal opposition seen as a threat to Malay supremacy, the poor performance of UMNO in the 2008 election also had the effect of strengthening the Malay monarchies that served as symbolic protectors of Malay interests, which contrasted with their previous position during Mahathir's premiership.

=== Foreign affairs ===
In contrast to Mahathir, Abdullah's administration adopted a "moderate and low profile approach" to foreign policy, doing away with the former's confrontational, often anti-Western attitude.

Relations with Singapore, with whom the previous administration frequently clashed with over issues such as Batu Puteh and the supply of raw water improved. Meanwhile, relations with Myanmar and Thailand cooled as a result of the former's persecution of Rohingya Muslims and the latter's killings of ethnic Malays during the South Thailand insurgency. Malaysia's relations with Indonesia warmed at the beginning of Abdullah's premiership but became increasingly strained later on as cases of mistreatment against Indonesian migrant workers and the Malaysian government's heavy handed approach to illegal Indonesian immigrants elicited public outcry in the neighbouring state.

Abdullah's promotion of Islam Hadhari in the context of the war on terror was welcomed by the United States, with whom the Malaysian government cooperated with in the former's efforts to combat Islamist terrorism internationally. Nevertheless, it opposed the 2003 invasion of Iraq. Negotiations for a free trade agreement with the United States began in 2005 but were never concluded. Relations were complicated when it was revealed that a Malaysian company was manufacturing parts for the Libyan nuclear programme and various Malaysian companies were implicated in smuggling military parts to Iran.

During Abdullah's tenure, Malaysia sought closer ties with China and signed several agreements as part of the Association of Southeast Asian Nations (ASEAN), including the ASEAN–China free trade agreement. Malaysia and China also released two joint communiqués and signed a memorandum of understanding on defence cooperation in 2004 and 2005.

Abdullah's government supported both the United States and China's efforts to resolve the issue of North Korean nuclear proliferation through the Six-Party Talks, and Kuala Lumpur served as a platform for secret meetings and negotiations.

Despite the ongoing Darfur genocide, Abdullah's government continued to invest in Sudan's oil industry, in which Malaysia was the second-largest shareholder behind China. Abdullah expressed support for the Sudanese government's policy towards Darfur.

=== Resignation ===
Blamed for the coalition's poor performance in the 2008 Malaysian general election, Abdullah was put under increasing pressure to resign as prime minister by coalition partners and UMNO leaders alike. Mahathir's announcement that he was leaving UMNO in May was widely understood as an attempt to force Abdullah's resignation. There were also fears that Sabah and Sarawak-based parties in the Barisan Nasional coalition might switch allegiances to the opposition led by Anwar Ibrahim.

On 10 July 2008, Abdullah announced he would step down as UMNO president and prime minister in 2009. During the UMNO general assembly on 1 April 2009, Abdullah stood down as party president in favour of his deputy, Najib Razak and was succeeded by him as prime minister on 3 April 2009.

Abdullah was subsequently conferred with the title of "Tun" by the King of Malaysia, Mizan Zainal Abidin for his services to the nation.

== Personal life ==
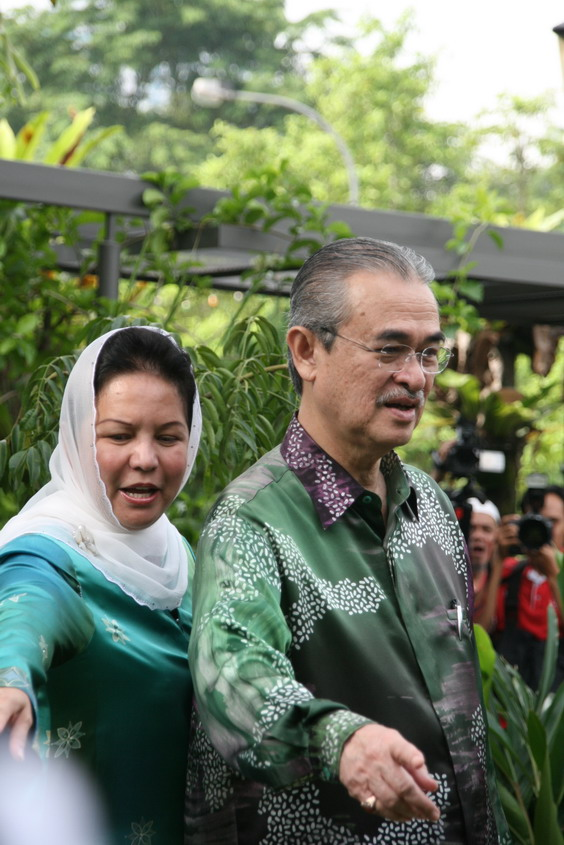
Abdullah with his wife, Jeanne Abdullah

Abdullah met Endon while he was working at the Federal Establishment Office (now the Public Service Department) in the 1960s and they were married in 1965. They had two children, a son Kamaluddin Abdullah and a daughter, Nori Abdullah, who is married to Khairy Jamaluddin. Both Abdullah and Endon had four grandchildren.

On 20 October 2005, Abdullah Badawi's wife, Endon Mahmood, died of breast cancer. Endon discovered the disease in 2003 while her twin sister Noraini, who had earlier been diagnosed with the same illness, died in January 2003. She received treatment in the United States and returned to Malaysia 18 days before her death. She is buried at a Muslim cemetery, at Taman Selatan, Precinct 20, Putrajaya.

On 6 June 2007, the Prime Minister's office announced Abdullah Badawi's marriage to Jeanne Abdullah. On 9 June, a private ceremony was conducted at the Prime Minister's residence, Seri Perdana, and attended by close relatives. Jeanne was formerly married to Endon Mahmood’s younger brother. She was also a manager at the Seri Perdana residential complex and has two children from her previous marriage.

Abdullah was criticised for allowing his son-in-law, Khairy Jamaluddin, to become unduly influential in UMNO politics.

Abdullah was also criticised for allowing his brother Fahim Ibrahim Badawi to buy 51 percent of the government-controlled MAS Catering Sdn Bhd. Fahim later sold this stake to Lufthansa's LSG Skychef at a huge profit.

He was known also as a poet. His poem, "I Seek Eternal Peace" was translated into more than 80 languages and published as a book.

== Illness, death and state funeral ==
On 11 September 2022, Abdullah's son-in-law and former health minister, Khairy Jamaluddin, publicly revealed that Abdullah had been battling dementia and was no longer able to recognise family members or communicate effectively. In the years that followed, his declining health kept him away from the public eye and he required the assistance of a wheelchair. In 2024, he was admitted to the hospital due to spontaneous pneumothorax.

Abdullah died following complications from multi-organ failure at the National Heart Institute in Kuala Lumpur, on 14 April 2025, at the age of 85. The next day, his body lay in state at the main prayer hall of the National Mosque from 10 am to 1 pm, before being laid to rest at the Heroes' Mausoleum at around 2:30 pm.

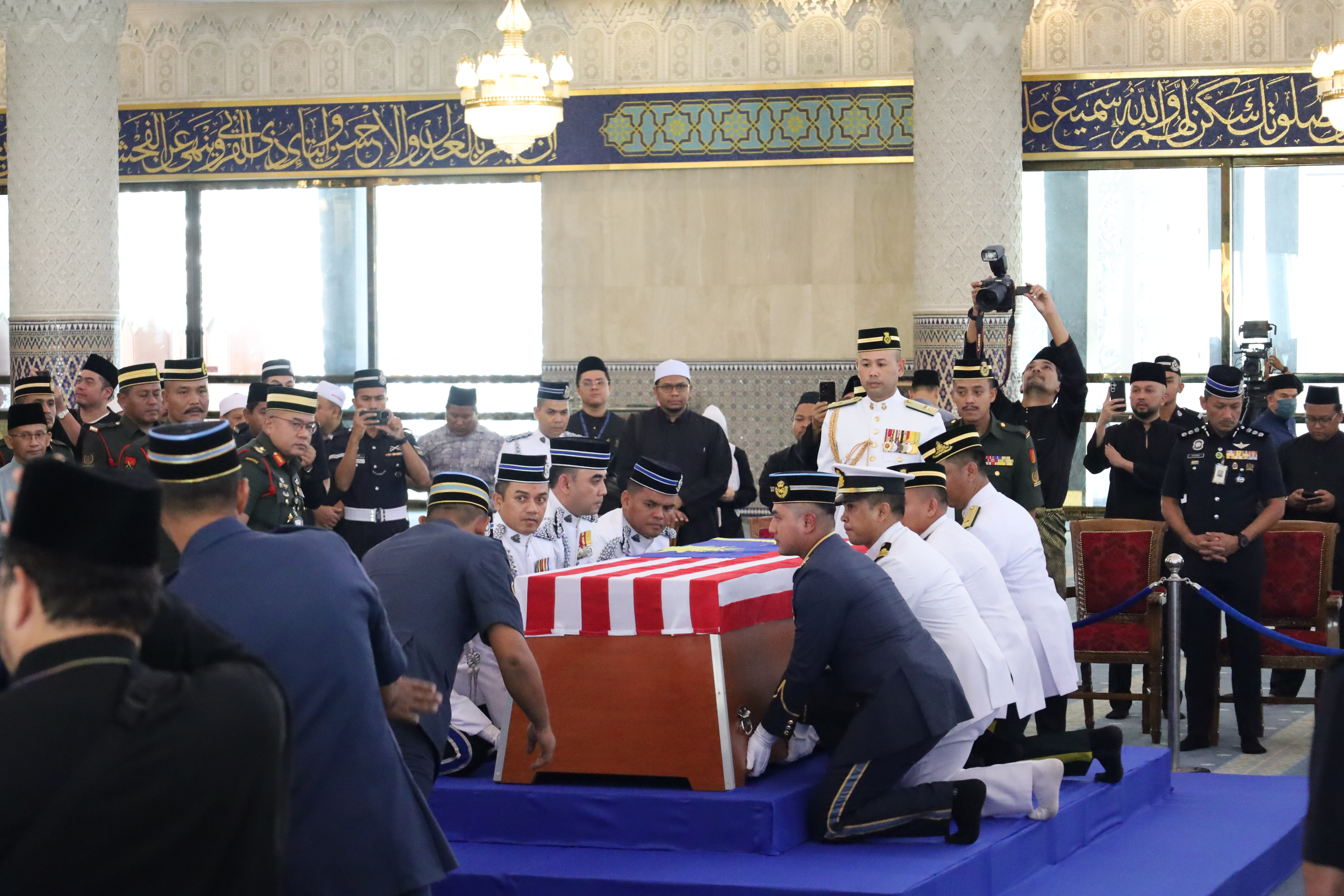
Abdullah lying in state at the National Mosque of Malaysia on 15 April 2025

The ceremony was attended by numerous dignitaries and royalty, including the Sultan of Terengganu, Sultan Mizan Zainal Abidin Sultan Mahmud, the Tunku Besar of Seri Menanti, Tunku Ali Redhauddin Tuanku Muhriz, the Yang di-Pertua Negeri of Malacca Mohd Ali Rustam and his predecessor Mohd Khalil Yaakob, (Note: Former Yang di-Pertua Negeri of Malacca, served from June 2004 to June 2020.) the Yang di-Pertua Negeri of Penang Ahmad Fuzi Abdul Razak, the Yang di-Pertua Negeri of Sabah Musa Aman, Prime Minister Anwar Ibrahim, Senior Minister of Singapore Lee Hsien Loong, (Note: Former Prime Minister of Singapore, served from August 2004 to May 2024.) Deputy Prime Ministers Ahmad Zahid Hamidi and Fadillah Yusof, Speaker of the Dewan Rakyat Johari Abdul and Inspector-General of Police Razarudin Husain. All four living former prime ministers—Mahathir Mohamad, Najib Razak, Muhyiddin Yassin and Ismail Sabri Yaakob—also paid their final respects. Actress Michelle Yeoh and Singaporean musician Ramli Sarip also paid their respects.

== Election results ==
Parliament of Malaysia
Year	Constituency	Candidate	Votes	Pct	Opponent(s)	Votes	Pct	Ballots cast	Majority	Turnout
1978	P035 Kepala Batas	Abdullah Ahmad Badawi (UMNO)	12,645	62.41%	Musa Mohd. Yatim (PAS)	7,616	37.59%	21,491	5,029	81.81%
1982	P035 Kepala Batas	Abdullah Ahmad Badawi (UMNO)	16,759	68.51%	Mohamad Sabu (PAS)	4,115	16.82%	25,277	12,644	80.29%
1982	P035 Kepala Batas	Abdullah Ahmad Badawi (UMNO)	16,759	68.51%	Khoo Soo Hoe (DAP)	3,589	14.67%	25,277	12,644	80.29%
1986	P038 Kepala Batas	Abdullah Ahmad Badawi (UMNO)	15,463	69.33%	Ahmad Hasan Salahuddin (PAS)	6,841	30.67%	22,900	8,622	75.81%
1990	P038 Kepala Batas	Abdullah Ahmad Badawi (UMNO)	17,025	70.35%	Ahmad Awang (S46)	7,174	29.65%	24,931	9,851	80.25%
1995	P041 Kepala Batas	Abdullah Ahmad Badawi (UMNO)	22,521	82.77%	Naser Mohd Radzi (S46)	4,687	17.23%	28,301	17,834	78.39%
1999	P041 Kepala Batas	Abdullah Ahmad Badawi (UMNO)	19,985	69.40%	Abd Khalid Rasid (PAS)	8,810	30.60%	29,413	11,175	81.22%
2004	P041 Kepala Batas	Abdullah Ahmad Badawi (UMNO)	25,403	77.72%	Abd Khalid Rasid (PAS)	7,281	22.28%	33,356	18,122	84.19%
2008	P041 Kepala Batas	Abdullah Ahmad Badawi (UMNO)	23,445	65.78%	Subri Md Arshad (PAS)	12,199	34.22%	36,328	11,246	84.45%

== Honours and awards ==
=== Honours of Malaysia ===
- Malaysia
  - Grand Commander of the Order of the Defender of the Realm (SMN) – Tun (2009)
  - Officer of the Order of the Defender of the Realm (KMN) (1975)
  - Member of the Order of the Defender of the Realm (AMN) (1971)
  - Recipient of the 10th Yang di-Pertuan Agong Installation Medal (1994)
  - Recipient of the 11th Yang di-Pertuan Agong Installation Medal (1999)
  - Recipient of the 12th Yang di-Pertuan Agong Installation Medal (2002)
  - Recipient of the 13th Yang di-Pertuan Agong Installation Medal (2007)
  - Recipient of the 14th Yang di-Pertuan Agong Installation Medal (2012)
- Federal Territory (Malaysia)
  - Grand Knight of the Order of the Territorial Crown (SUMW) – Datuk Seri Utama (2010)
- Johor
  - First Class of the Royal Family Order of Johor (DK I) (2004)
- Kedah
  - Recipient of the Kedah Supreme Order of Merit (DUK) (2006)
- Kelantan
  - Recipient of the Royal Family Order of Kelantan (DK) (2006)
- Malacca
  - Knight Grand Commander of the Premier and Exalted Order of Malacca (DUNM) – Datuk Seri Utama (2004)
- Negeri Sembilan
  - Knight Grand Commander of the Order of Loyalty to Negeri Sembilan (SPNS) – Dato' Seri Utama (2000)
- Pahang
  - Member 1st class of the Family Order of the Crown of Indra of Pahang (DK I) (2006)
  - Knight Grand Companion of the Order of Sultan Ahmad Shah of Pahang (SSAP) – Dato' Sri (1999)
- Penang
  - Knight Grand Commander of the Order of the Defender of State (DUPN) – Dato' Seri Utama (2004)
  - Commander of the Order of the Defender of State (DGPN) – Dato' Seri (1997)
  - Companion of the Order of the Defender of State (DMPN) – Dato' (1981)
  - Member of the Order of the Defender of State (DJN) (1979)
- Perak
  - Knight Grand Commander of the Perak Family Order of Sultan Azlan Shah (SPSA) – Dato' Seri DiRaja (2003)
  - Recipient of the Sultan Azlan Shah Silver Jubilee Medal (2009)
- Perlis
  - Knight Grand Companion of the Order of the Gallant Prince Syed Sirajuddin Jamalullail (SSSJ) – Dato' Seri Diraja (2001)
  - Recipient of the Tuanku Syed Sirajuddin Jamalullail Installation Medal (2001)
- Sabah
  - Grand Commander of the Order of Kinabalu (SPDK) – Datuk Seri Panglima (1999)
- Sarawak
  - Knight Grand Commander of the Order of the Star of Hornbill Sarawak (DP) – Datuk Patinggi (2003)
- Selangor
  - Knight Grand Commander of the Order of the Crown of Selangor (SPMS) – Dato' Seri (2000)
  - Knight Companion of the Order of Sultan Salahuddin Abdul Aziz Shah (DSSA) – Dato' (1992)
  - Recipient of the Sultan Sharafuddin Coronation Medal (2003)
- Terengganu
  - Supreme Class of the Order of Sultan Mizan Zainal Abidin of Terengganu (SUMZ) – Dato' Seri Utama (2005)

=== International honours ===
- Brunei
  - Family Order of Brunei 1st Class (DK) – Dato Laila Utama (2010)
- Chile
  - Grand Cross of the Order of Bernardo O'Higgins (1994)
- Indonesia
  - Star of the Republic of Indonesia (2nd Class) (2007)
- Japan
  - First Class of the Order of the Sacred Treasure (1991)
- Kosovo
  - Order of Independence (2025; posthumously)
- South Korea
  - Grand Gwanghwa Medal of the Order of Diplomatic Service Merit (1992)
  - Gwanghwa Medal of the Order of Diplomatic Service Merit (1983)

=== Honorary degrees ===
- Australia
  - Honorary Ph.D. degree in Technology from Curtin University of Technology (2018)
- Malaysia
  - Honorary Ph.D. degree in Humanities from University of Malaya (2009)

=== Others ===
- Indonesia
  - Lencana Tunas Kencana from Gerakan Pramuka Indonesia (2007)
- Malaysia
  - Anugerah Felo INTAN from National Institute of Public Administration (2017)
- United Kingdom
  - Honorary fellowship from London's Chartered Institute of Marketing (1999)

=== Namesakes ===
- Jalan Tun Abdullah Ahmad Badawi, a 5.5 km highway located in Batu Kawan, Penang.
- Maktab Rendah Sains MARA (MRSM) Tun Abdullah Badawi, a premier boarding school in Kepala Batas, Seberang Perai, Penang.
- Kolej Tun Abdullah Ahmad Badawi, a residential college at Universiti Kebangsaan Malaysia, Selangor.
- Tun Abdullah Ahmad Badawi Gallery in Menara Prisma, Putrajaya

== See also ==
- Khairy Jamaluddin
- Administrative and Diplomatic Officer

== Notes ==
Political offices
Preceded by Sulaiman Daud	Minister of Education; 1984–1986	Succeeded by Anwar Ibrahim
Preceded by Mahathir Mohamad	Minister of Defence; 1986–1987	Succeeded by Najib Razak
Preceded by Abu Hassan Omar	Minister of Foreign Affairs; 1991–1999	Succeeded by Syed Hamid Albar
Preceded by Mahathir Mohamad	Minister of Home Affairs; 1999–2004	Succeeded by Azmi Khalid
Preceded by Mahathir Mohamad	Minister of Finance; 2003–2008	Succeeded by Najib Razak
Preceded by Najib Razak	Minister of Defence; 2008–2009	Succeeded by Ahmad Zahid Hamidi
Preceded by Anwar Ibrahim	Deputy Prime Minister of Malaysia; 1999–2003	Succeeded by Najib Razak
Preceded by Mahathir Mohamad	Prime Minister of Malaysia; 2003–2009	Succeeded by Najib Razak
Party political offices
Preceded by Anwar Ibrahim	Deputy President of the United Malays National Organisation; 1999–2003	Succeeded by Najib Razak
Preceded by Mahathir Mohamad	President of United Malays National Organisation; 2003–2009	Succeeded by Najib Razak
Diplomatic posts
Preceded by Mahathir Mohamad	Secretary General of the Non-Aligned Movement; 2003–2006	Succeeded by Fidel Castro
Preceded by Khamtai Siphandon	Chair of the Association of Southeast Asian Nations; 2005	Succeeded by Gloria Macapagal Arroyo
