= Syeikh Abdullah Fahim =

Malaysian Islamic scholar (1869–1961)

Tuan Guru Syeikh Abdullah Fahim عبدالله فهيم

Mufti of Penang
- In office 1951–1956
- Preceded by: Office established
- Succeeded by: Abdullah Ismail

Personal details
- Born: 1869 Mecca, Sharifate of Mecca, Ottoman Empire (now Hejaz, Saudi Arabia)
- Died: April 28, 1961 (aged 91–92) Penang, Federation of Malaya
- Resting place: Jami'ul Badawi Mosque, Kepala Batas, Penang
- Education: Al-Azhar University
- Occupation: Islamic scholar, astronomy
- Religion: Sunni Islam

Syeikh Abdullah bin Ibrahim Badawi Fahim (Jawi: شيخ عبد الله فهيم; c. 1869 – 27 April 1961) was a Malaysian Islamic scholar, astronomer and nationalist. He is noted for determining the date of Malaya's independence as 31 August 1957 when consulted by national leaders. He served as the first Mufti of Penang following Malaysian independence and was the paternal grandfather of Malaysia’s fifth Prime Minister, Abdullah Ahmad Badawi.

He was popularly known as "the Pauper King" (Raja Papa), a nickname reflecting his modest lifestyle despite holding significant religious and social positions.

== Early life and education ==
Abdullah Fahim was born in Sha‘b ‘Ali, a district near Masjid al-Haram in Mecca, in 1869 CE, which was then under the Ottoman Empire. Some accounts suggest that he was born in Kampung Kubur Panjang, Kedah, before moving to Mecca with his father, Sheikh Ibrahim Tahir.

During his time in Mecca, Abdullah Fahim studied under over 42 scholars across 15 disciplines, including prominent figures such as Syed Abu Bakr Syatha and Sheikh Wan Ahmad al-Fatani. In addition to religious studies, it is reported that he was exposed to discussions on international and Islamic politics. He was widely known by the names "Pak Him," "Chaiain," and locally as "Tok Ngah Lah."

== Religious and educational work ==
Upon returning to Malaya in 1916, Abdullah Fahim began teaching Islamic theology from his family home in Kepala Batas, Penang, which would later become the political stronghold of his grandson. He later founded Madrasah Daeratul Ma’arif Al Wataniah in 1926. In 1932, he was invited by the Sultan of Perak to head Madrasah Idrisiah in Kuala Kangsar as the mudir (director). He continued to teach until 1947.

=== Work in astronomy ===
Abdullah Fahim was recognised for advancing Islamic astronomy (ilmu falak), producing prayer timetables and teaching astronomical calculations as part of a communal obligation (fard al-kifayah), as well as an early astronomical observation site. He was also a writer and poet, authoring works such as Khutbah Penyedar (Awakening Sermons) and compiling a prayer calendar. His reputation attracted students from across Malaya, Singapore, Indonesia, and Brunei.

== Political involvement ==
Though not directly involved in political parties, Abdullah Fahim was regarded as an influential advisor during the nationalist movement. Leaders such as Tunku Abdul Rahman and Onn Jaafar were reported to have sought his counsel on various matters.

He proposed to Tunku the date of 31 August 1957 AD or 6 Safar 1377 AH as an auspicious time for Malaya’s independence: he based it on calculating the expected sighting of the Mizan (Libra) constellation, a folk symbol of justice, immediately after sunset (as by timekeeping practices) which would never happen again until 1962. Thus, Abdullah urged the proclamation to be done on that date as soon as possible. Abdullah Fahim also advised the Tunku to pursue multiracial cooperation to fulfill British conditions for independence and provided strategic recommendations regarding negotiations in London, suggesting departure by ship and return by air.

Abdullah Fahim was also linked to early Islamic political movements and was one of the founding figures of Hizbul Muslimin, an early Islamic political party that later evolved into the Parti Islam Se-Malaysia (PAS). He was also one of the candidates for the presidency of PAS during its founding in 1951 but lost the position to Haji Ahmad Fuad, who had previously served as the head of UMNO's Religious Affairs Bureau.

== Legacy ==
Abdullah Fahim died on 27 April 1961 in Kepala Batas, Kedah.

His descendants, including his son Ahmad Badawi and grandson Abdullah Ahmad Badawi, would later become prominent leaders in UMNO, a rival political party historically opposed to PAS and later Prime Minister. On 12 February 2008, Prime Minister Abdullah launched the inaugural Chair of the Islam Hadhari Institute at Universiti Kebangsaan Malaysia, named in honour of his grandfather. The institute was described as the first of its kind in the country, intended to promote a deeper understanding of Islam nationally and internationally.

== See also ==
- Hizbul Muslimin
- Astronomy in the medieval Islamic world
