= Malacca State Library =

Library in Malacca, Malaysia

- Perpustakaan Negeri Melaka
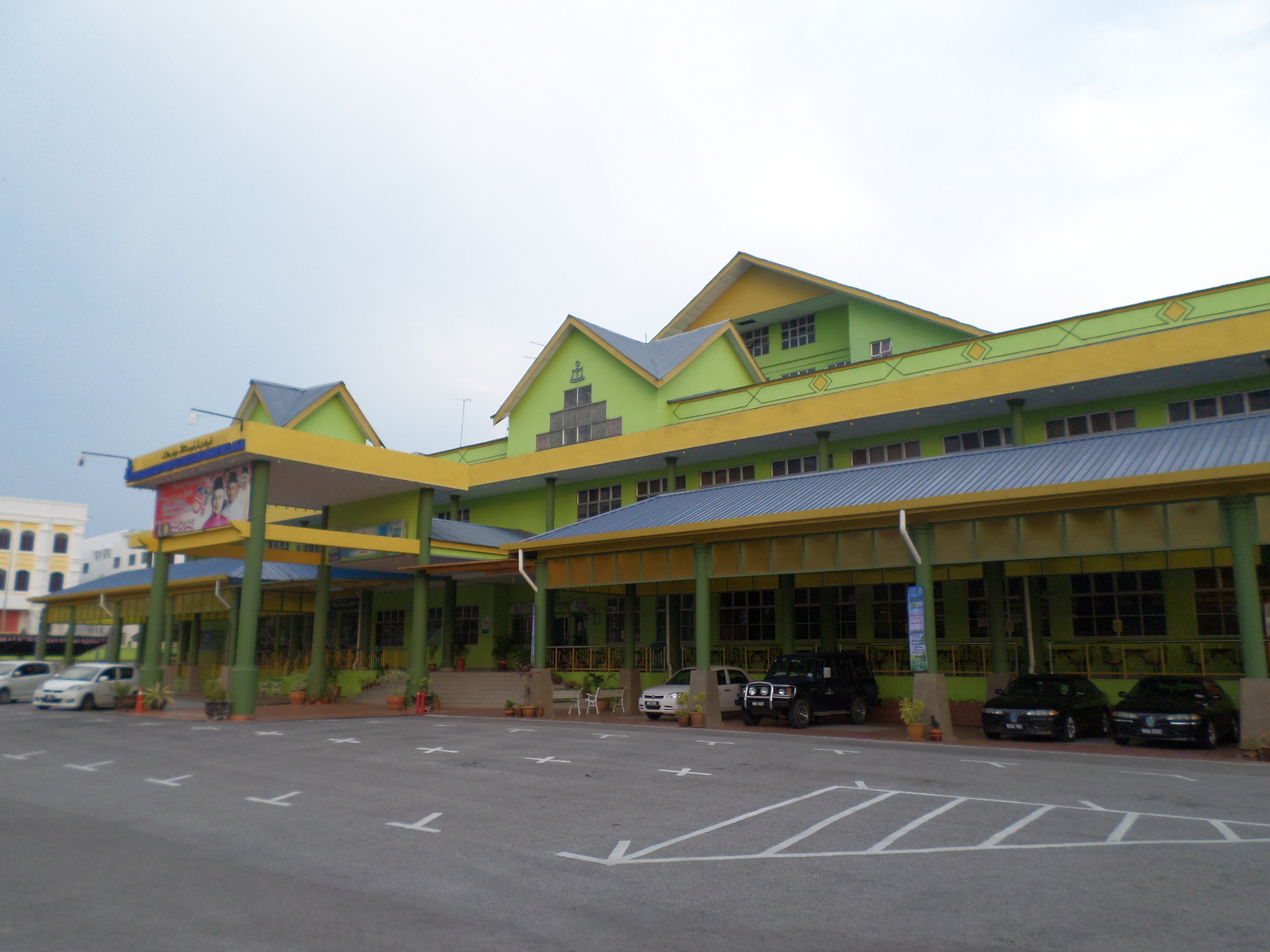
- 2°12′58.0″N 102°16′09.9″E
- Location: Bukit Baru, Malacca, Malaysia
- Type: State Library
- Established: 4 November 1996

Other information
- Website: http://www.perpustam.gov.my/

Malacca State Library (Malay: Perpustakaan Negeri Melaka) is the main public library of the Malaysian state of Malacca, located in the town of Bukit Baru. It is currently the headquarters of the Malacca Public Library Corporation (Malay: Perbadanan Perpustakaan Awam Melaka, abbreviated as PERPUSTAM), a statutory body of the Malacca State Government and also a constituent feeder library of the National Library of Malaysia. Malacca State Library is currently one of the two state libraries in the country not located in the capital city, the other one being Penang State Library in Seberang Jaya.

== History ==
The history of the Malacca State Library can be traced back to December 1881 when the subscription library Malacca Library was established at the Rest House in Malacca Town Centre, the third such library in Malaya after Penang (Penang Library) and Singapore (Raffles Library). Malacca Library was moved to the Stadthuys on 21 January 1910, and again to a building at Fort Road (Jalan Kota) which now Houses the Malaysia Architecture Museum since 2004 on 19 April 1956, before it was moved to Level 1, Hang Tuah Hall on 19 February 1966 and officiated by then-Minister of Finance Tan Siew Sin. The Malacca Public Library Corporation was established in 1977 and utilised the hall as its headquarters following the passing of a bill 2 years earlier.

== Current building ==
On 6 May 1996, the corporation moved its headquarters to a building in Bukit Baru, which became the Malacca State Library. On 1 July 1996, parts of the building including the Reference Collection Section were soft opened to the public. The building was inaugurated by Governor of Malacca Syed Ahmad Syed Mahmud Shahabuddin on 4 November 1996. The original library at Level 1, Hang Tuah Hall became a Higher Learning Institute Branch Library under the Library Corporation in 1999, before it was finally shut down in December 2009.

== Collection Sections ==
- Examination Collection Section
- Lincoln Collection Section
- Loan Collection Section
- Malacca Collection Section
- Publication Collection Section
- Reference Collection Section

== See also ==
- List of libraries in Malaysia
- List of tourist attractions in Malacca
- National Library of Malaysia
