= St. David's High School, Malacca =

St. David's High School
- Sekolah Menengah Kebangsaan Tinggi St. David 圣大卫中学

Location
- Jalan Tanjung; Bukit Baru, Malacca, 75150; Malaysia
- Coordinates: 2.22106°N 102.276°E

Information
- Type: SMK (National Secondary School)
- Motto: Truth and Honour
- Religious affiliation: Christian
- Denomination: Anglican Church
- School district: Central Malacca
- School code: MEB2093
- Principal: Not Decided Yet
- Teaching staff: 82
- Forms: 1-5
- Enrollment: 1484 (2022)
- Language: Malay, English, Chinese and Tamil
- Last updated: 30 November 2022

Saint David's High School (Malay: Sekolah Menengah Kebangsaan Tinggi St. David; Chinese: 圣大卫中学) is a co-educational missionary secondary school in Bukit Baru, Malacca, Malaysia.

The high school campus

== School history ==
Dr (Mrs.) Ferguson David from Anglican Diocese of Singapore, founded St. David's High School in 1912. She was also the founder of St. David's Hospital in Malacca; the hospital's service was ended and was replaced with a school, Sekolah Tinggi Cina. In 1956, Commander Hudson from the Christ Church Parish Committee had given a piece of land (555.5 acres) in Bukit Baru to be the site for this school. In the same year, the Director of Education (Dr F.J.A. Rawcliffe) with the permission from Allayarham Tun Abdul Razak, Minister of Education, started the project. The school was open by the end of the 1950s, but not in its actual campus; 160 Form One students met during the afternoons using the facilities of Malacca High School that year. The next year, four years after the project was started, a three-story building, including toilets and canteen, was ready and opened by the Governor of Malacca, Tun Hj. Abd. Malek bin Yusuf. A few additional classrooms would be added over the next few years.

Three years later, the Form 4 classes were started with 9 students in the art stream and 3 students in the science stream. In 1964, for the first time, 55 students sat for the Cambridge exam in this school. The Malacca state government gave a piece of land (222.5 acres) to the school as a field in 1964; two years later, in 1966, a hall and industrial art block were opened. On 25 September 1970, Deputy Director of Education Malaysia, Mr. Abdullah Sultan opened the opening of the ‘Seni Perusahaan' building. On 5 August 1975, the science block was opened by YB Mr. Chan Siang Sun, Malaysia's then-Deputy Director of Education. In 1989, the school started to accept female students, and in 1994, The Khoo Wing, consisting of four classrooms, was opened, removing the need for floating (or roving) classes.
