= Libraries of the Universiti Sains Malaysia =

Academic library in Penang, Malaysia

Library was established in 1969 known as the Library of the University of Penang at the Malayan Teachers College, Gelugor, Penang. Library was moved to Minden (temporary buildings) in 1971 and occupy the new building in 1979. Main Library 2 has been completed in 1994.

On December 10, 2004, the main campus library was named after the name of the First Vice Chancellor of Universiti Sains Malaysia, Tan Sri Hamzah Sendut. Currently, the library consists of three buildings named as Hamzah Sendut Library (PHS), Perpustakaan Hamzah Sendut 1 (PHS1), and Perpustakaan Hamzah Sendut 2 (PHS2).

== Branches ==
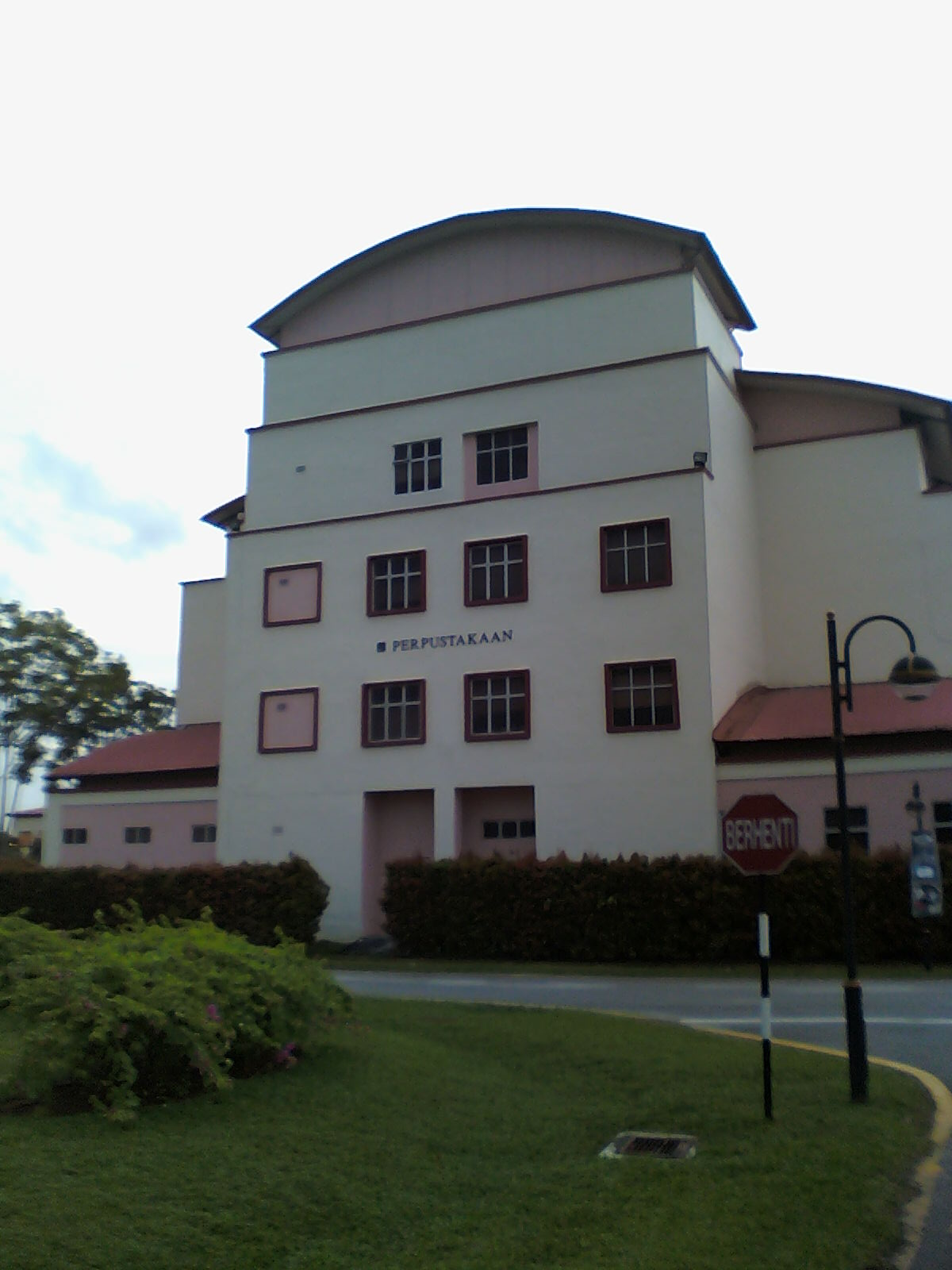
The Engineering Library.

- Main Branch: Perpustakaan Hamzah Sendut, Perpustakaan Hamzah Sendut 1, Perpustakaan Hamzah Sendut 2, Perpustakaan Pusat Islam, Perpustakaan PTPM, Pusat Sumber HBP
- Kelantan Branch: Perpustakaan Hamdan Tahir
- Nibong Tebal Branch: Perpustakaan Kejuruteraan
- PITM, Kepala Batas Branch: Pusat Ilmu Translasional dan Maklumat (IPPT)

== See also ==
- List of libraries in Malaysia
