= Kuala Lumpur Library =

Library in Kuala Lumpur, Malaysia

- Perpustakaan Kuala Lumpur
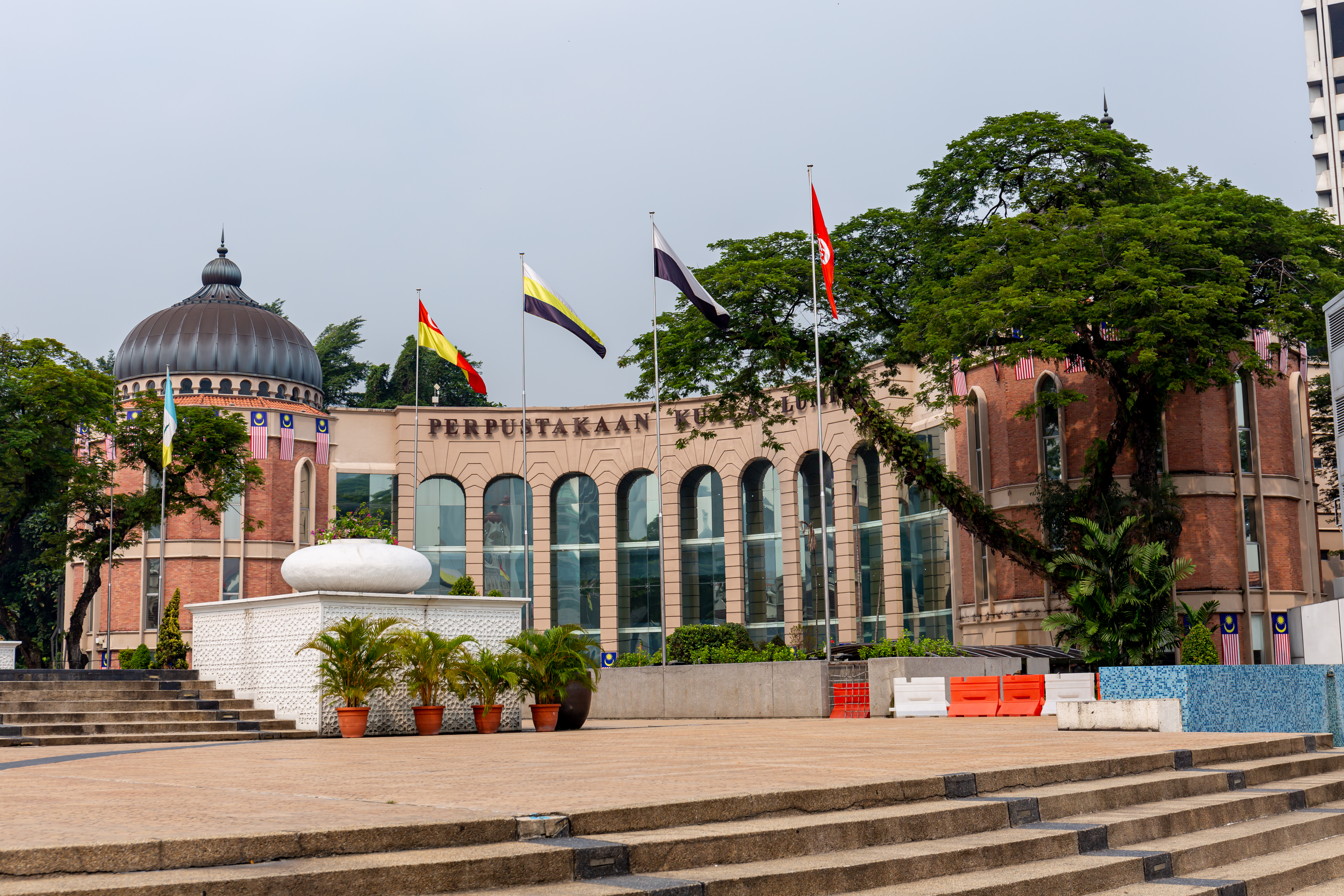
- Kuala Lumpur Library in 2019
- 3°8′51.2″N 101°41′33.6″E
- Location: Kuala Lumpur, Malaysia
- Type: library
- Established: 1989

Other information
- Director: Anita Binti Mohd Jali
- Website: Official website

The Kuala Lumpur Library (Malay: Perpustakaan Kuala Lumpur) is the main library of Kuala Lumpur, Malaysia. It has 16 branches around Kuala Lumpur:

- Pustaka KL @ Taman Tun Dr Ismail;
- Pustaka KL @ Medan Idaman;
- Pustaka KL @ Lembah Pantai;
- Pustaka KL @ Muhibbah;
- Pustaka KL @ Bandar Baru Sentul;
- Pustaka KL @ Setiawangsa;
- Pustaka KL @ Bandar Tun Razak;
- Pustaka KL @ Desa Tun Razak;
- Pustaka KL @ Gombak Setia;
- Pustaka KL @ Sri Sabah;
- Pustaka KL @ Sri Pantai;
- Pustaka KL @ Semarak;
- Pustaka KL @ Beringin;
- Pustaka KL @ IDB (For DBKL Staff only);
- Pustaka KL @ Keramat;
- Pustaka KL Digital madani @ Bandar Sri Permaisuri.

== History ==
The museum building was constructed in 1898 to a design by A.C. Norman and J. Riddell; It was initially a government printing office for the British administration in Malaya. The building was reopened in 2019 after it was refurbished.

== Collections ==
The library consists of various books ranging from monograph, business, economy, music, art, magazines, newspapers, references, etc.

== Facilities ==
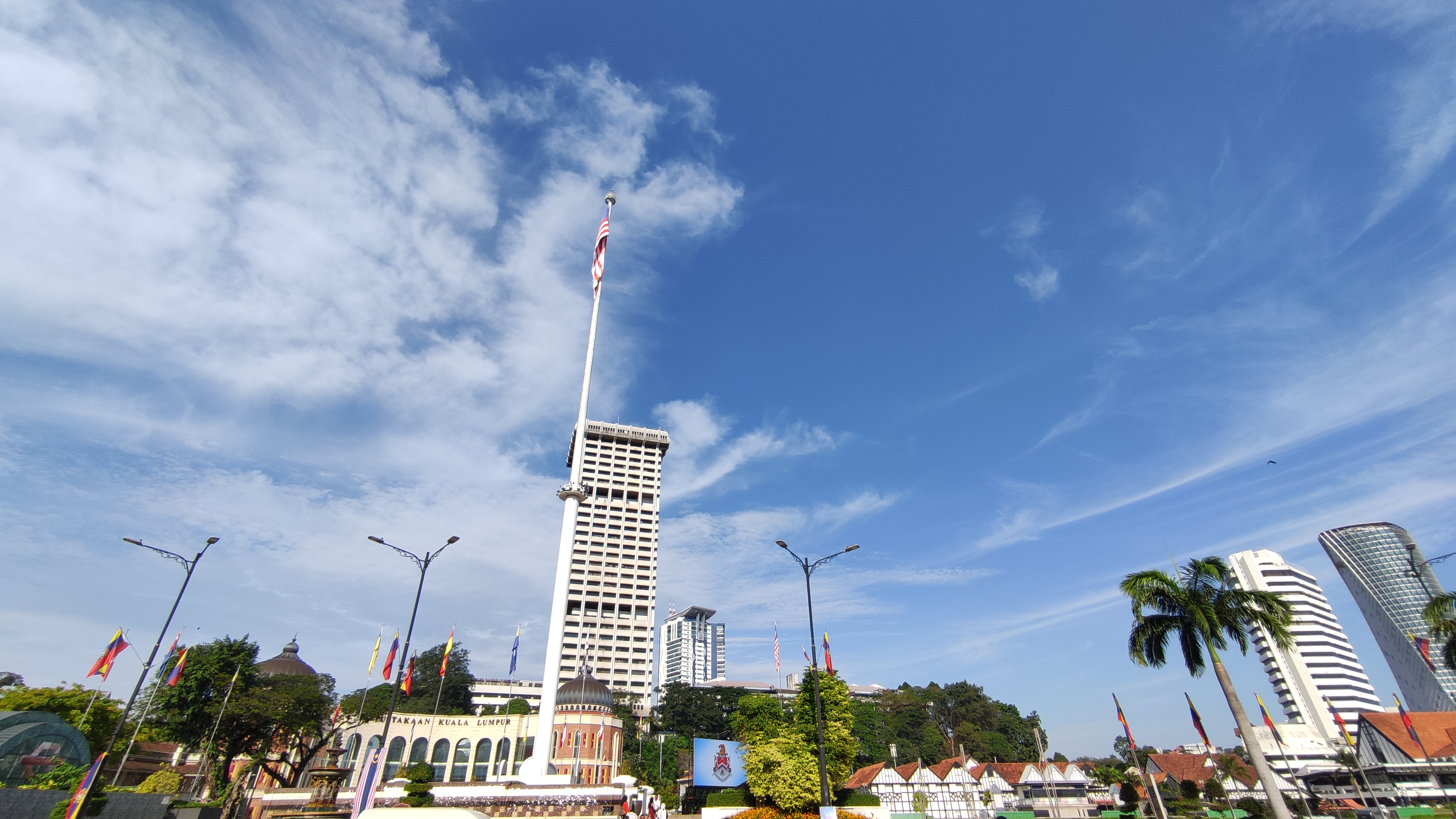
Park in front of Kuala Lumpur Library

The library is also equipped with auditorium, multipurpose hall and meeting rooms.

== Transportation ==
The library is accessible within walking distance south west of Masjid Jamek LRT Station.

== See also ==
- List of libraries in Malaysia
- List of tourist attractions in Kuala Lumpur
- National Library of Malaysia
