= PATMA Library =

- Perpustakaan Alam dan Tamadun Melayu
- 2.9259726503202526°N 101.78269809114772°E
- Location: Bangi, Malaysia
- Established: 1973

Other information
- Director: Sakinah Mohammed
- Website: PATMA Library Site

The PATMA Library (Malay: 'Perpustakaan Alam dan Tamadun Melayu') is a university library, part of the National University of Malaysia in Bangi, Selangor, Malaysia.

== See also ==
- List of libraries in Malaysia
