= List of libraries in Malaysia =

This is a list of libraries in Malaysia.

== Libraries by state/territory ==
=== Johor ===
- Tun Hussein Onn University Tunku Tun Aminah Library
- University of Technology Malaysia Sultanah Zanariah Library
- University of Technology Malaysia Raja Zaritf Sofiah Library

=== Kedah ===
- Northern University of Malaysia library (Malay: Perpustakaan Sultanah Bahiyah)

=== Kelantan ===
- Kelantan Public Library Corporation branch libraries
- University of Malaysia Kelantan Library (Malay: Perpustakaan Universiti Malaysia Kelantan)

=== Kuala Lumpur ===
- Central Bank of Malaysia library
- Kuala Lumpur Library
- Muthamizh Padippagam Library, Sentul
- National Defence University of Malaysia Tun Ibrahim General Library
- National Library of Malaysia
- National University of Malaysia Dr. Abdul Latiff Library, Kuala Lumpur
- University of Technology Malaysia ( Kuala Lumpur ) Perpustakaan Sultanah Zanariah

=== Labuan ===
- Labuan Public Library (Malay: Perpustakaan Awam Labuan)

=== Malacca ===
- Malacca State Library

=== Negeri Sembilan ===
- Negeri Sembilan Public Library Corporation branch libraries

=== Pahang ===
- University of Malaysia Pahang Library (Malay: Perpustakaan Universiti Malaysia Pahang)

=== Penang ===
- Malaysia Science University libraries

=== Perak ===
- Sultan Idris Education University library, Tanjung Malim (Malay: Perpustakaan Tuanku Bainun)

=== Perlis ===
- University of Malaysia Perlis Library (Malay: Perpustakaan Universiti Malaysia Perlis)

=== Sabah ===
- Sabah State Library
- Tanjung Aru Library
- Tawau Regional Library
- University of Malaysia Sabah Library (Malay: Perpustakaan Universiti Malaysia Perlis)

=== Sarawak ===
- Sarawak Museum Library, Kuching
- Sarawak State Library

=== Selangor ===
- National Energy University library (Malay: Perpustakaan Universiti Tenaga Nasional), Kuala Selangor
- National University of Malaysia, Bangi
  - PATMA Library, Bangi
  - Tun Seri Lanang Library
- Raja Tun Uda Library
- Taylor's University Library
- University of Putra Malaysia Sultan Abdul Samad Library

=== Terengganu ===
- Terengganu Public Library Corporation libraries
- University of Malaysia, Terengganu, library (Malay: Perpustakaan Sultanah Nur Zahirah)

== See also ==
- Copyright law of Malaysia
- List of public university libraries in Malaysia (in Malay)
- Malaysian literature
- Mass media in Malaysia
- National Archives of Malaysia
