= Bukit Baru =

Town in Malacca, Malaysia

- Suburb
- Interactive map of Bukit Baru
- Coordinates: 2°13′19.7″N 102°16′37.0″E
- Country: Malaysia
- State: Malacca
- District: Melaka Tengah

Area
  - Total: 15 km^{2} (5.8 sq mi)
  - Suburb: 11.2 km^{2} (4.3 sq mi)
  - Town: 3.8 km^{2} (1.5 sq mi)

Population (2020)
  - Total: 50,798
  - Density: 3,400/km^{2} (8,800/sq mi)
- (Note: Including 36,792 people in the suburb and 14,006 people in the town area.)
- Postal code: 75XXX

Bukit Baru is a suburb of Malacca City in the Malaysian state of Malacca, which is administered by two local governments: Hang Tuah Jaya Municipal Council to the north and Historical Malacca City Council to the south. Most of the suburb consists of residential area, although a small area of village and rice fields still exists near Bukit Beruang.

== Education ==
- International College of Yayasan Melaka (ICYM) - Established on 23 March 1997, the college offers programmings such as Aviation and Aeronautics, Computering and Engineering Technology, Media and Art Technology, Hotel and Tourism Management, Business Management and Social Sciences.
- Malacca State Library - The main library of the state of Malacca. It is the headquarters of the Malacca Public Library Corporation since 6 May 1996, and was inaugurated by Governor of Malacca Syed Ahmad Syed Mahmud Shahabuddin on 4 November 1996.
- Manipal University College Malaysia (MUCM) - The foremost private institution for medical education in the state and one of the three Malaysian overseas branches of the Manipal Academy of Higher Education. It was established in 1997 as Melaka Manipal Medical College (MMMC), and upgraded into a university college in January 2021.
- St. David's High School, Malacca - Co-educational missionary secondary school founded by Dr (Mrs.) Ferguson David from Anglican Diocese of Singapore in 1912.

== Tourist attractions ==
- Toy Museum

== See also ==
- Hang Tuah Jaya
