= Muthamizh Padippagam Library =

Oldest Tamil language library in Malaysia

Muthamizh Padippagam
- முத்தமிழ்ப் படிப்பகம் Khutub Khanah Muthamizh
- Location: Kuala Lumpur, Malaysia
- Type: library

Muthamizh Padippagam is a Malaysian library located in Sentul, Kuala Lumpur. This library now owns 22,858 Tamil language books from various international authors under its collection and 2,008 collections of books from local authors.

== History ==
The library was established on 14 April 1958 by Sentul railway staff. It is the oldest Tamil language library in Malaysia.

Originally located at Jalan Ipoh, in 1974 it moved to its current location at Jalan Sentul. Muthamizh Padippagam 788, Jalan Sentul Sentul Kuala Lumpur

== See also ==
- List of libraries in Malaysia
