= Sabah State Library =

Public library in Sabah, Malaysia

- Perpustakaan Negeri Sabah
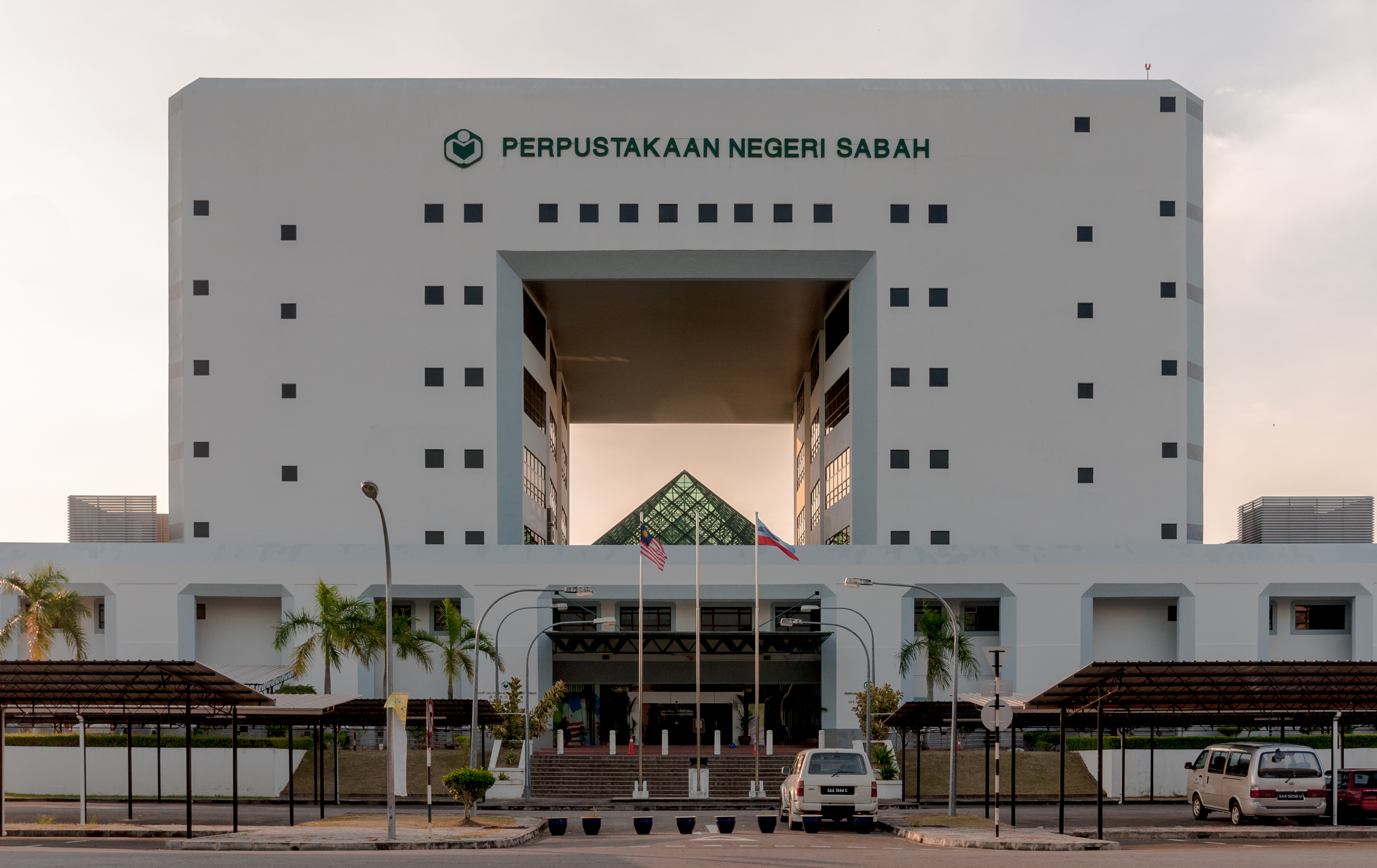
- The headquarters of Sabah State Library
- 5°57′29.1″N 116°04′42.8″E
- Location: Luyang, Kota Kinabalu, Sabah, Malaysia
- Type: Public library
- Established: 1953
- Service area: Statewide
- Branch of: Ministry of Science, Technology and Innovation of Sabah

Other information
- Website: www.library.sabah.gov.my

Sabah State Library (Malay: Perpustakaan Negeri Sabah) is a state department under the State Ministry of Education and Innovation Sabah which manages each of the public library branches in Sabah state of Malaysia which is in turn a constituent feeder library of the National Library of Malaysia. The headquarters and the main state library are located on Tasik Road, off Maktab Gaya Road in Luyang of Kota Kinabalu since June 2004.

== History ==
The first library of North Borneo was established as a section of the Broadcasting and Information Department in 1953. In 1966 through the newly formed federation of Malaysia, the library was merged with the Sabah Museum to form the Libraries and Museum Department before it was separated in 1972 with the formation of a Library Department under the Ministry of Social Welfare. The department administration was then passed to the State Ministry of Culture, Youth and Sports and the name began to be changed into Sabah State Library in 1976. Jurisdiction of the state library returned to the Ministry of Social Services in 1982.

== Headquarters and main library ==
The main state library consists of the following facilities and collections:

Level	Collections/Facilities
2	Children Internet and PWD Corner
3	3 Discussion Rooms, Dictionaries and Encyclopaedias, Reference And Information Counter, Red Spot Collection, General Reference (Open Access), Magazines & Journals, Return & Renewal Of Book Loans, Registration And Membership Renewal, Internet / Wifi Registration, Newspaper
4	Hypermedia Corner (12 TV), Adult Internet Corner (20 Computers), 2 Discussion Rooms
5	Government Publications, Malaysiana, Law, White Spot, 3 Discussion Rooms
6	State Depository Collection, Sabah Collection, 1 Discussion Room, Antiquarian Collection, Microfilm Machine
7	3 Discussion Rooms, National Depository Collection

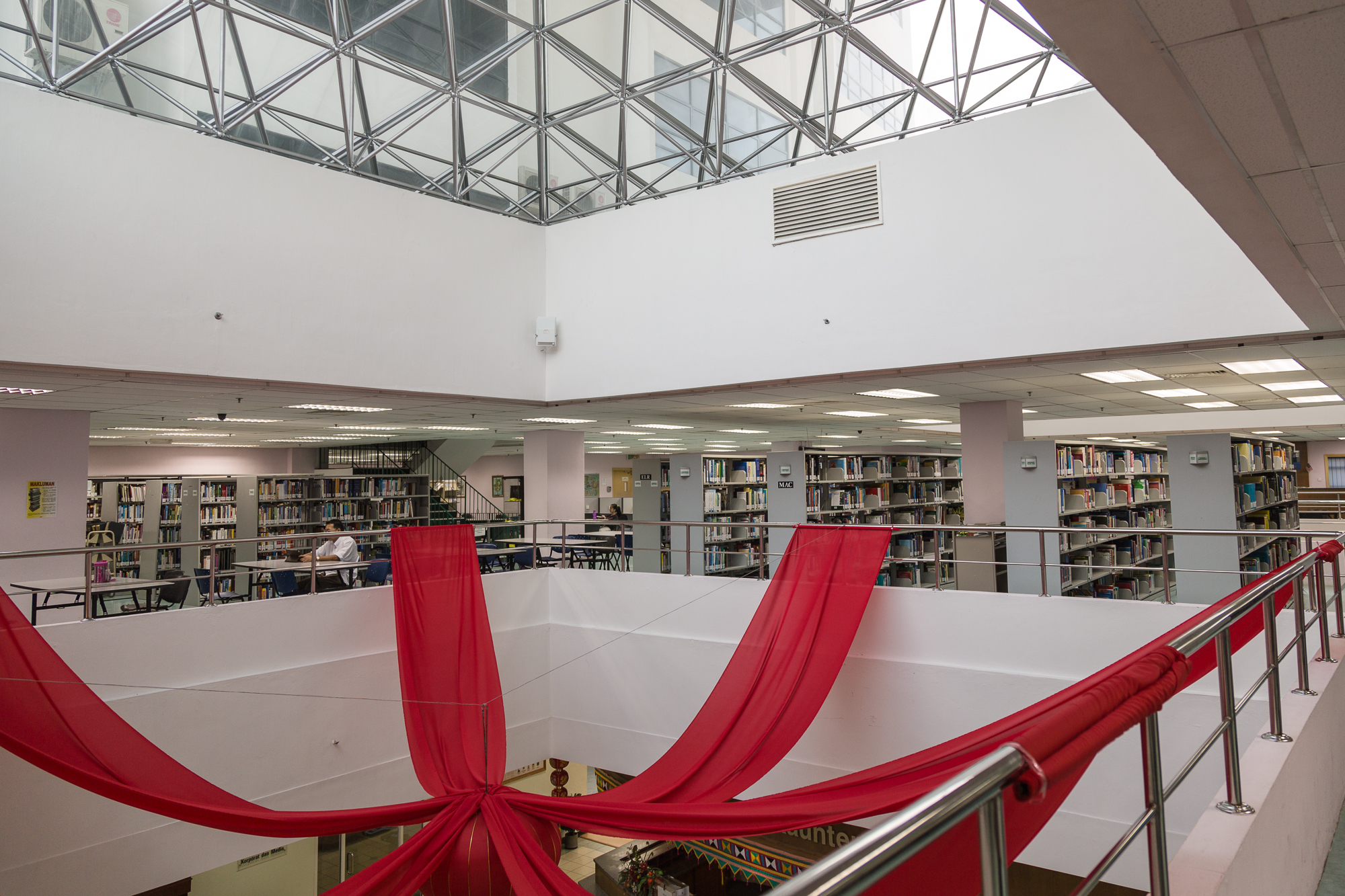
Book section in the interior.

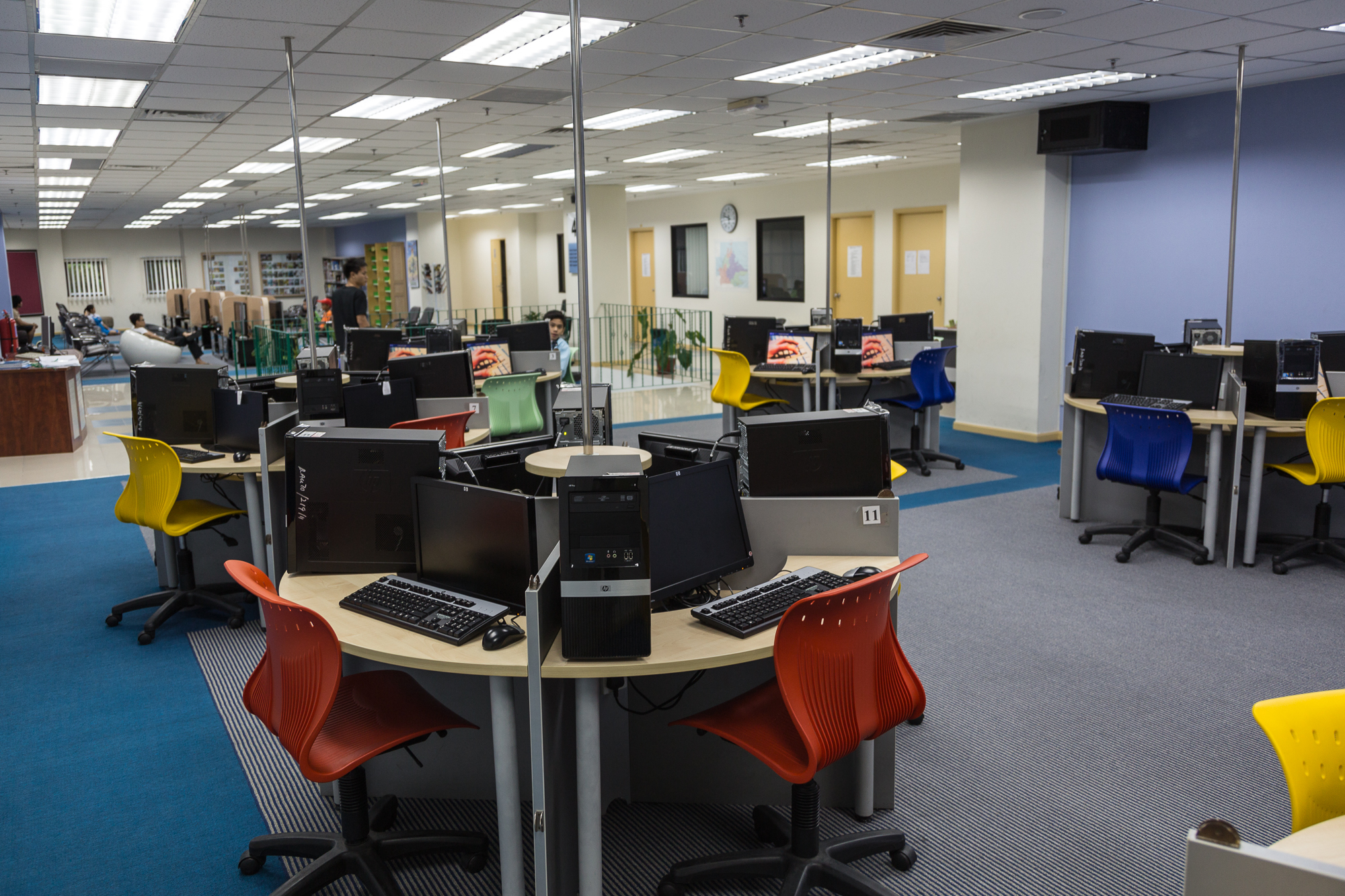
Computer section.

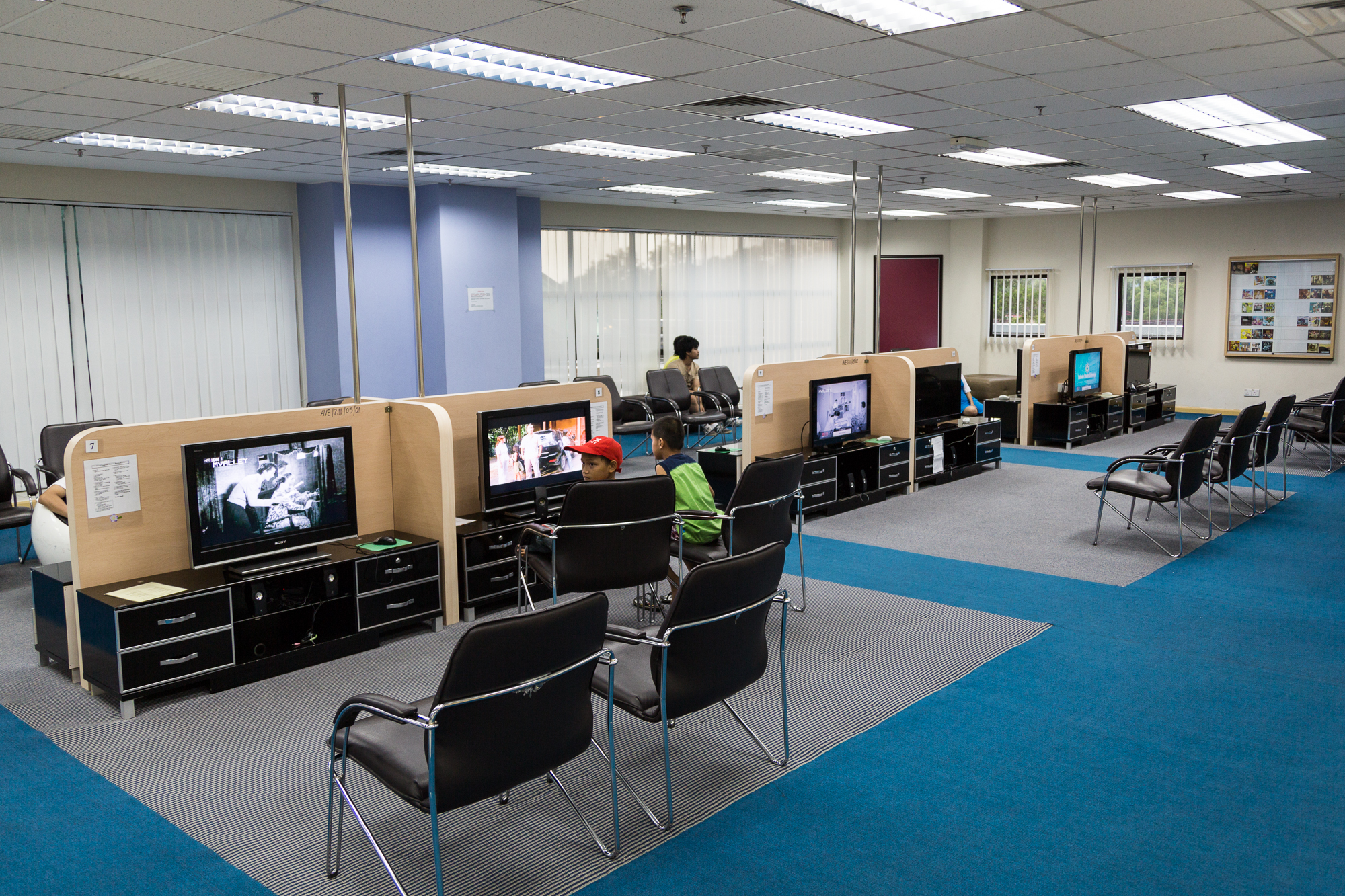
Interior of the library headquarters.

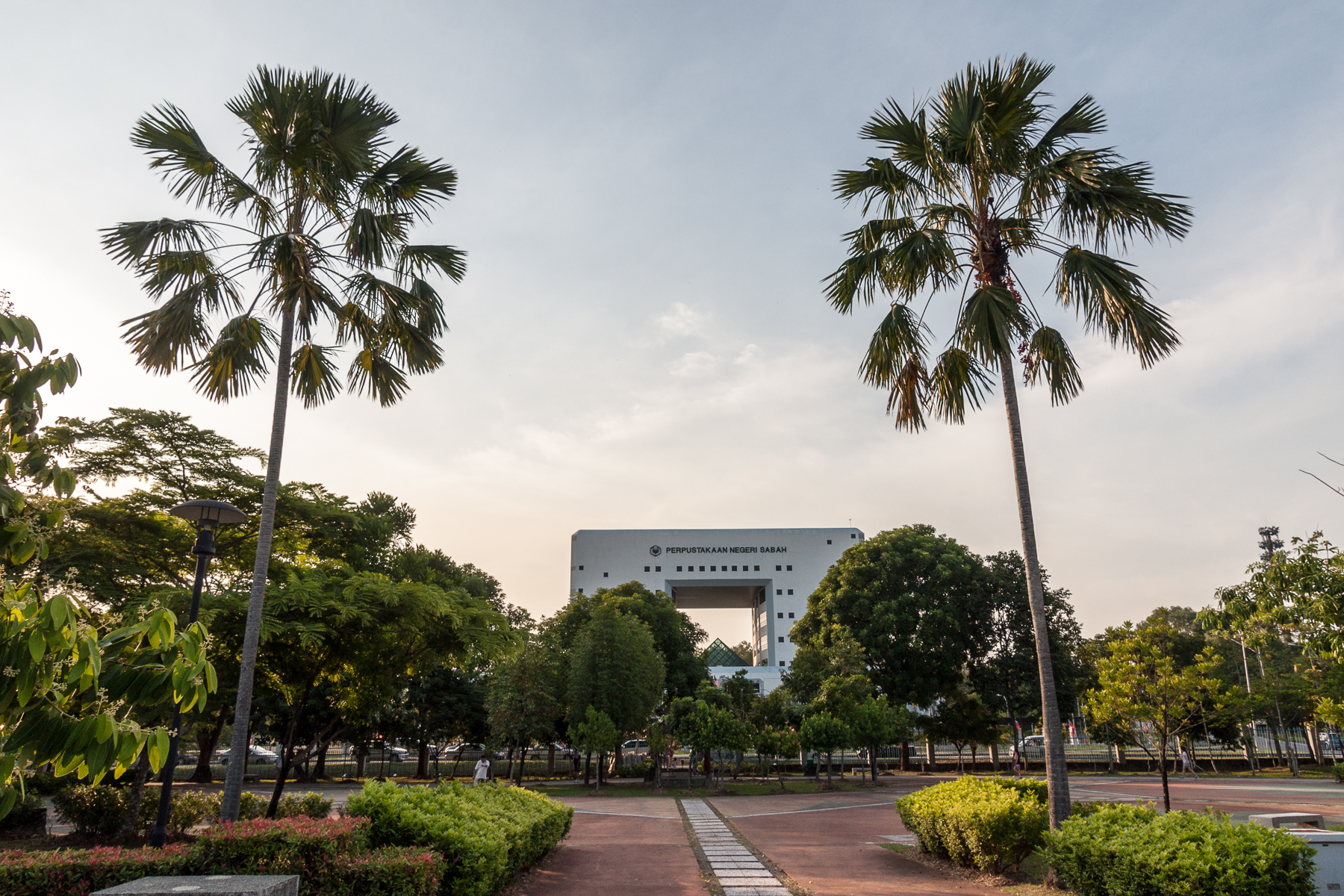
The headquarters seen afar.

== Branch libraries ==
This is a list of branch libraries under the Sabah State Library Department:

- Bandar Sri Indah Library
- Beaufort Library
- Beluran Library
- Keningau Library (regional)
- Kinabatangan Library
- Kota Belud Library
- Kota Marudu Library
- Kuala Penyu Library
- Kudat Library
- Kunak Library
- Lahad Datu Library
- Membakut Library
- Nabawan Library
- Papar Library
- Penampang Library
- Ranau Library
- Sandakan Library (regional)
- Semporna Library
- Sipitang Library
- Tambunan Library
- Tamparuli Library
- Tanjung Aru Library
- Tawau Library (regional)
- Tenom Library
- Tuaran Library
- UTC Library
- Kota Kinabalu International Airport Library
- State Administrative Centre Library

== Rural libraries ==
There are 67 rural libraries in 25 districts as of 2022.

== See also ==
- List of libraries in Malaysia
