= Raja Tun Uda Library =

- Perpustakaan Raja Tun Uda
- 3°5′21″N 101°31′59″E
- Location: Jalan Kelab Golf 13/6, Shah Alam, Seksyen 13, Selangor, Malaysia
- Type: State Library
- Established: 2005

Other information
- Parent organisation: Pentadbiran Perpustakaan Awam Selangor (Selangor Public Library Corporation)
- Website: https://www.ppas.gov.my/en/fasiliti/ https://ppas.elib.com.my/

Raja Tun Uda Library (Malay: Perpustakaan Raja Tun Uda) is the main public library of the Malaysian State of Selangor. It is located at Section 13, Shah Alam next to the Sultan Abdul Aziz Shah Golf & Country Club and has 6 stories and an area of around 203,600 sq ft; it is currently the headquarters of the Selangor Public Library Corporation (Malay: Perbadanan Perpustakaan Awam Selangor, abbreviated as PPAS), a statutory body of the Selangor State Government and also one of the constituent feeder libraries of the National Library of Malaysia.

== History ==
The Selangor State Government originally planned on building a monument at the site. However, at the request of the Sultan of Selangor, His Royal Highness, Sultan Sharafuddin Idris Shah Alhaj, the site was then turned into a public library as a contribution to help the people of Selangor.

== Location ==
Raja Tun Uda Library is located next to Sultan Abdul Aziz Shah Golf and Country Club by the suggestion of Sultan Sharafuddin Idris Shah Alhaj, who wanted the library inside a park.

== Building ==
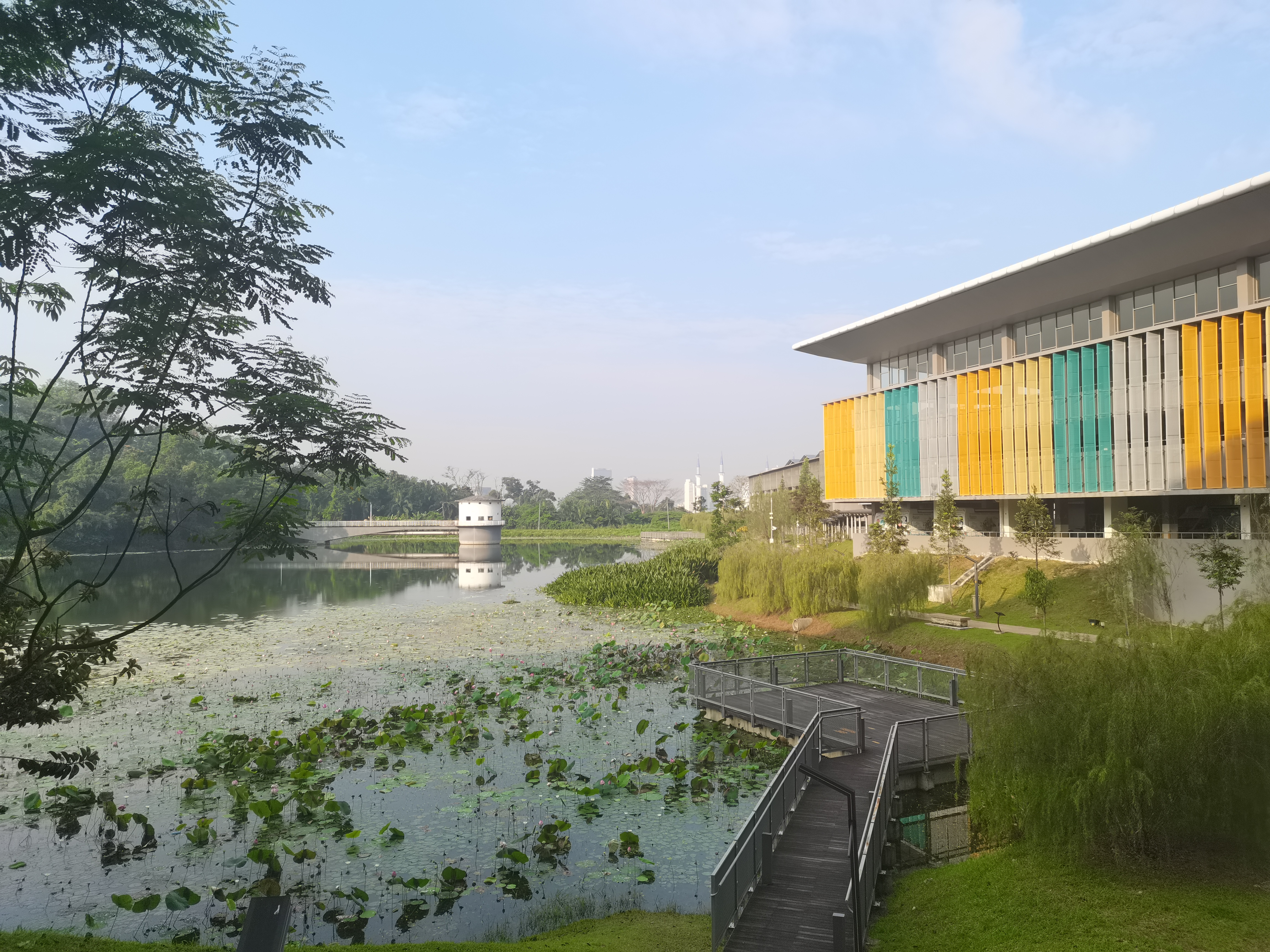
Lake Garden

The RM70mil building has a floor area of 206,300 square feet (19,171 square meters). The 6-storey building has many facilities scattered around such as a braille room, sound studio, auditorium, seminar rooms, multipurpose halls, meeting room, cafeteria and a relaxation area. The Ground Floor has a Creative Zone and Leisure area. The 1st-3rd floors contain various of books from different subjects and the 4th floor contains the Sultan's Collection and The Selangor Info Hub.

== See also ==
- List of libraries in Malaysia
