= Islam Hadhari =

Islamic policy in Malaysia government

Islam Hadhari (Arabic: الإسلام الحضاري) or "Civilisational Islam" is a theory of government based on the principles of Islam as derived from the Qur'an. It was founded in Malaysia by its first prime minister Tunku Abdul Rahman in 1957 (but under a different name), and has been promoted by successive Malaysian governments, in particular, by the fifth Prime Minister Abdullah Ahmad Badawi.

== Overview ==
Islam Hadhari should not be viewed as just the renewal of the old concept Islam Madani or Islam Hadhari as practised by the Islamic prophet Muhammad and his companions centuries ago. It should be viewed as the renewal of the old concept, in tandem to the modern era needs, on the relevancy of the Islamic maxims of the teaching of Islam to help solve the problems or issues of the modern Muslim ummah today (Ibrahim JCH, 2007). The concept or slogan 'Islam Hadhari' was officially launched in 2004 by the fifth Prime Minister of Malaysia, Abdullah Ahmad Badawi (2004–2009).

In spite of that, its main principles, such as, believing and obeying (taqwa) towards Allah, fair and just government system, independence of soul (of the people), acquisition of knowledge, balance and comprehensive economic development, quality standard of life, protection of women's rights and minority group, uphold morality and ethics, and so on – are in accordance with the teaching of the Quran and Sunnah.

Islam Hadhari is not a new religion, or a new school of thought, as propounded or reflected by some antagonism. Islam Hadhari is also not a new sect. Islam Hadhari is an effort to bring Muslims to the fundamentals contained in the Quran and Sunnah (Hadith), which are the core orientation of Islam Hadhari. Islam Hadhari is true if interpreted and understood clearly, and should not be diverted or misunderstood in any way (Ibrahim JCH, 2007; Mohd Azizuddin, 2010).

As a government responsible for protecting the sanctity of Islam and Muslims without slipping ensure that faith can face the challenges and realities of the current, open the door to ijtihad so that interpretation can be associated with the inherited form and pattern of development according to time and from place to place. It should be reviewed various approaches and methodologies for streamlined to be more balanced and comprehensive, covering the development of infrastructure and economic development, strengthen the human development through a comprehensive education program, is complemented by the development program to instill spiritual values and values Islam in life (Mohd Azizuddin, 2010).

== Defining Islam Hadhari ==
The word Islam Hadhari consists of two words, Islam and Hadhari. Further contemplation of the concept of Islam Hadhari needs one to dichotomise the word Islam and Hadhari.

The word Islam (Ibrahim JCH, 2007):

- Literal meanings:
  - Submission, surrender, obedience, acknowledgement, approval, and the acceptance of Allah. (Quran, Surah Al-Baqarah 2:208)
  - سلام (salam), the root word for the word Islam, means peace, tranquility. (Quran, Surah Al-Anfal 8:61)
- Technical meanings:
  - A religion that stands for the complete submission and obedience to Allah to achieve real peace of body and mind. (Quran, Surah Al-Baqarah, 2: 136; Mawdudi, 1992)
  - A divine religion (Quran, Surah Ash-Shaff 61:9), a religion of all Prophets. (Quran, Surah Al-Imran 3:84 & Al-Baqarah 2:136)

The word Hadhari (Ibrahim JCH, 2007):

- The word 'hadhari' or 'madani' means township, city, urban. Also means modern, contemporary.
- The word 'hadhaari' or 'hadhariyah' means civilisation, that is civilisation which follows the teaching of Islam.

Thus, in essence, the word Islam Hadhari concisely refers to 'Islamic Civilisation' or 'Civilisation of Islam'. Hence, Islamic Civilisation demands its followers to be the best of example for mankind, to other Muslim, and also to non-Muslim. As said in the Qur'an:

‘You are the best of nation (people) evolved for mankind, enjoining what is right, forbidding what is wrong, and believing in Allah.’ (Quran, Surah Al-Imran 3:110)

Additionally, the Arabic word حضارة (ḥaḍāra, from which 'Hadhari' is derived) refers to both 'civilisation' and 'settled life' or 'sedentariness' (i.e. not being nomadic), so that the term Islam Hadhari implicitly contrasts itself with the Islam of nomads or the Bedouin (badwi or badawi). Notably, Abdullah's own surname Badawi (of Hadhrami heritage from Yemen) means "Bedouin".

== Principles of Islam Hadhari ==
It consists of 10 fundamental principles.

- Faith and piety in Allah
- Just and trustworthy government
- Freedom and independence to the people
- Mastery of knowledge
- Balanced and comprehensive economic development
- Good quality of life for all
- Protection of the rights of minority groups and women
- Cultural and moral integrity
- Protection of the environment
- A strong defence policy

Islam Hadhari calls for Muslim to be progressive, modern and dynamic (in thinking and practice), which essentially encompasses the sphere of economy, politics, social, cultural, educational, defence, astronomy, and so on. Yet, Muslims are taught to be moderate in their behaviour and attitude, such that they should not indulge in excessive actions or extremism in their zeal to be the best of example for mankind - ‘Moderation in behaviour and attitude, yet dynamic and progressive in thinking and practice.’ (Ibrahim JCH, 2007). As said in the Qur'an:

'Thus, We have made of you an ummah justly balanced, that ye might be witnessed unto others ... ’ (Quran, Surah Al-Baqarah 2:143)
