= Sarawak State Library =

Library in Kuching, Sarawak, Malaysia

- Pustaka Negeri Sarawak
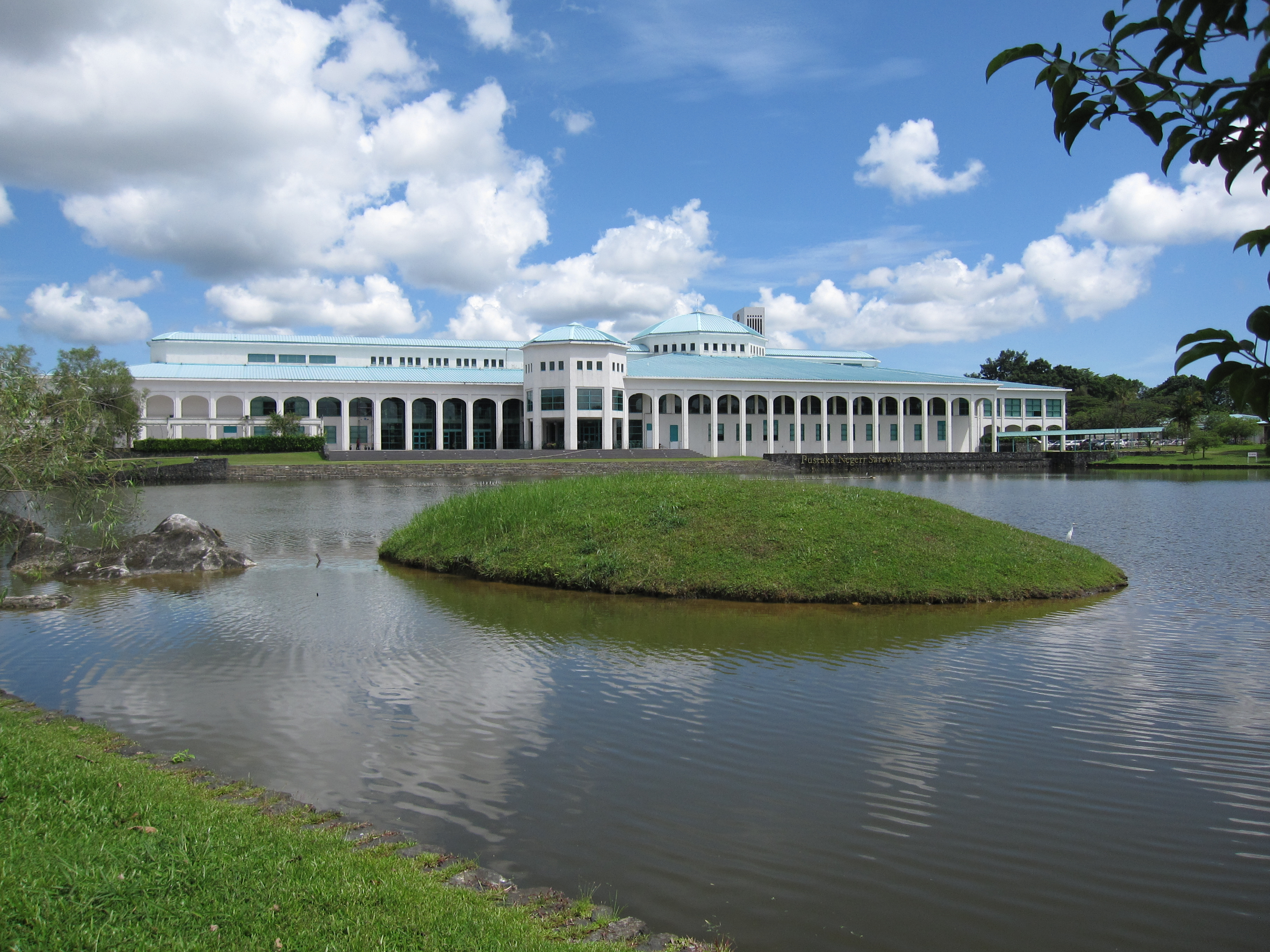
- 1°35′00.5″N 110°20′59.5″E
- Location: Kuching, Sarawak, Malaysia
- Type: state library
- Established: 2000

Other information
- Director: Japri bin Bujang Masli; Hamid Bugo (Chairperson)
- Website: Official website

The Sarawak State Library (Malay: Pustaka Negeri Sarawak) is the state library of Sarawak, located in Kuching, Sarawak, Malaysia. It was established in 1999 with the passing of the Sarawak State Library Ordinance 1999 by the Sarawak State Legislative Assembly. The official opening of the main campus in Kuching on 31 December 1999 was attended by Abdul Taib bin Mahmud, the Chief Minister of Sarawak. Services for the public started on 2 January 2000.

== History ==
The story of Pustaka started in May 1993 when Dr. David Jones, the Library Building Consultant of the State Library of New South Wales visited Kuching and had few discussions with senior officers of the Sarawak Civil Service, including the State Secretary, Tan Sri Datuk Amar Haji Hamid Bugo. Following these J. discussions and earlier work by Stephen J. Parker entitled "Developing public library services in Sarawak", Dr. David Jones began to prepare a design brief. The first draft of the design brief was ready at the end of same year. The project was then called the State Library and Information Technology Centre. On 23 June 1994, the design brief which had gone various draft stage was presented to the State Cabinet and subsequently approved.

== Statutory Functions ==
The main functions of Pustaka as stipulated in the Sarawak State Library Ordinance, 1999 are to

- to provide, maintain and preserve library resources and act as a centre for the storage and dissemination or transmission of knowledge, information and data on the State;
- to be a centre for reference, education and information or dissemination of information relevant to the economic, historical, social, cultural, political and other background development and achievements of the State;
- to acquire, maintain and preserve library resources and public records, especially, but not limited to, those published in the State or of interest to the people of Sarawak, and any person with a legitimate interest in having access to such resources;
- to maintain and manage relevant databases on materials published within the State or pertaining to its history, progress, current development, and other information and data on the State, or which have been compiled, produced or kept by the Government or any governmental authority in Malaysia;
- to maintain and manage an efficient and effective information transmission and dissemination network, including the provision of electronic network system, and to establish an information technology system with linkages to other libraries or information resource centres, within Malaysia or abroad;
- to manage or administer the State Depository for the preservation of public records, and of materials, of whatever form, published in the State;
- to hold and participate in exhibition or display of its library resources and the information or data collected, maintained or held by the State Library;
- to hold seminars, courses and other similar events to promote the use of its library resources, or the information or data collected or maintained by the State Library or at its disposal;
- to promote or stimulate interest in reading, library works and to promote literary arts and the usage of modern technology in the transmission and dissemination of knowledge, information and data;
- to facilitate the dissemination of knowledge and information, the appreciation of the arts, culture, traditions, history and achievements of the State and its people;
- to adopt and maintain an efficient and effective communication system for the transmission and distribution of knowledge, information or data, or materials kept, deposited in or maintained by the State Library;
- to provide such services and facilities as the State Library is able to provide to the public, and to any public library or resource centre, and to provide training for library personnel;

- to establish, manage and maintain public archives in the State;
- to promote efficient and effective records and archives management practices in the State;
- to establish, maintain and operate Record Centres;
- to provide training and guidance in the management of public records and public archives;
- to publish, sell or distribute publications concerning or relating to public archives, or concerning the activities of and facilities provided by the State Library;
- to promote public awareness activities on aspects pertaining to management of public records and public archives through exhibitions, audio-visual educational packages and other educational programmes

== Vision, Mission, Objective and Philosophy ==
Vision	To be the reservoir and fountain of information and knowledge to the State.
Mission	To provide access to information resources and to preserve Sarawak's intellectual heritage for the people of Sarawak.
Objective	To promote acculturation of knowledge in the State.
Philosophy	A knowledge and information-based society needs a forum for intellectual exchange among its people, a centre of enlightenment where minds can meet and ideas interact, and access to information, knowledge, technologies and cultures available beyond the superficial boundaries imposed by geography.

== Tag Line ==
a) Fountain and Reservoir of Knowledge - from 2000 to 2005
b) Pustaka, Your Knowledge Partner - from 2006 to 2016
c) Read. Innovate. Excel - from 2017 - now

== Fast Facts ==
Headquarters

Miri

Sibu

SRR

a) Commenced service on 1 January 2000.
a) Land size is 94 acres, including the lake.
b) Floor area is 12,731 square meters.
c) User seating capacity is 500.
d) Number of staff is 130.
e) Total collection is 90,000 copies.
f) Average use is 200 users per hour.

a) Commenced service on 3 October 2002.
b) Land size is 1.5 acre.
c) Floor area is 4,927 square meters.
d) User seating capacity is 200.
e) Number of staff is 40.
f) Total collection is 25,000 copies.
g) Average use is 200 users per hour.

a) Commenced service on 14 September 2020.
b) Land size is 8.3 acres.
c) Floor area is 8.5 square meters.
d) User seating capacity is 300.
e) Number of staff is 39.
f) Total collection is 30,000 copies.
g) Average use is 200 users per hour.

== See also ==
- List of libraries in Malaysia
