= Tanjung Aru Library =

Public library branch in Tanjung Aru, Sabah, Malaysia

- Perpustakaan Tanjung Aru
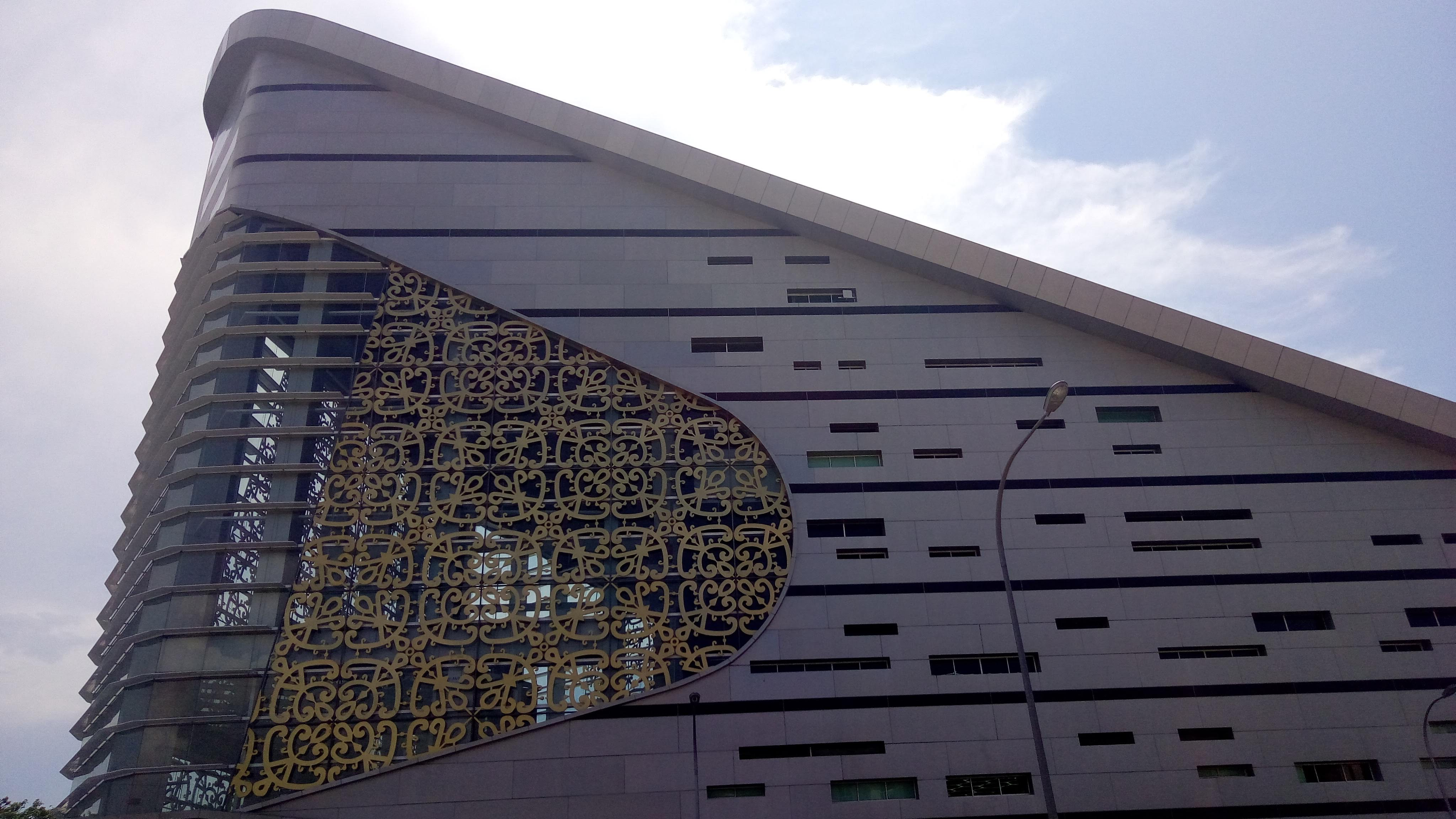
- Side view of the library
- 5°57′04.6″N 116°03′08.5″E
- Location: Tanjung Aru, Kota Kinabalu, Sabah, Malaysia
- Type: Public library
- Established: 1 April 2019
- Architect: Innotech Design Architects Sdn Bhd
- Branch of: Sabah State Library

Other information
- Website: www.library.sabah.gov.my/tjaru

Tanjung Aru Library (Malay: Perpustakaan Tanjung Aru) is a public library in the Greater Kota Kinabalu area of Tanjung Aru, Sabah, Malaysia. It's also the first "Green" library in Malaysia.

== History ==
The library complex was constructed as a replacement to one of the old Sabah State Library branch building in the city centre which has been demolished after it was declared unsafe. Its construction was jointly funded by Lahad Datu Water Supply Sdn Bhd and Sabah Development Bank under their corporate social responsibility (CSR) initiative, each contributing RM20 million for the project. The building was completed in 2017 before opened to public on 1 April 2019. Weeks after its opening, the children section on the first floor was forced to temporarily closed after its public amenities were vandalised by irresponsible visitors.

== Features ==
The six floors building sits on a 62,000 square feet area with its structure incorporated green design with the motifs of Sabah's ethnic communities besides the outer motif of the building designed to prevent heat from entering the atrium. Inside the library complex, there is an innovation centre, telecommunication museum with a section for users to share their creative ideas. The main lobby is located on the lower floor while children section on the first floor followed by teen library on the second floor, adult lending on the third floor, adult reference on the fourth floor and multi-purpose room on the fifth floor.

== See also ==
- List of libraries in Malaysia
