= National Archives of Malaysia =

Coordinates: 3.1771577°N 101.6739078°E

- Arkib Negara Malaysia ارکيب نݢارا مليسيا

Agency overview
- Formed: 1 December 1957; 68 years ago
- Jurisdiction: Government of Malaysia
- Headquarters: Kuala Lumpur
- Minister responsible: Datuk Aaron Ago Dagang, Minister of National Unity
- Agency executive: YBhg. Dato' Jaafar Sidek bin Abdul Rahman, Director-General
- Parent agency: Ministry of National Unity
- Website: www.arkib.gov.my

The National Archives of Malaysia (Malay: Arkib Negara Malaysia) is a Malaysian archive located in Kuala Lumpur.

== History ==
The National Archives of Malaysia were established in 1957 as the Public Records Office before changing to their current name in 1963. They established their current location in Jalan Duta in 1982. The National Archives Act 2003 (Act 629) was passed in 2003, providing the legislative basis for the National Archives of Malaysia for branch of archive.

== See also ==
- List of national archives
- List of libraries in Malaysia
