= Hizbul Muslimin =

Malaya political party

Muslim People's Party of Malaya Parti Orang Muslimin Malaya
- Abbreviation: HAMIM / Hizbul Muslimin
- Leader: Ustaz Abu Bakar al-Baqir
- Founded: 17 March 1948
- Dissolved: 1948
- Merged into: United Malays National Organisation (UMNO); Pan Malaysian Islamic Party (PAS)
- Headquarters: Gunung Semanggol, Perak
- Ideology: Islamism; Left-wing

Muslim People's Party of Malaya (Malay: Parti Orang Muslimin Malaya, abbreviated HAMIM or Hizbul Muslimin) is a defunct political party formed in British Malaya on 17 March 1948. Hizbul Muslimin was also the first Islamist political party of Malaya set-up to fight for the Federation of Malaya independence from the British colonisation.

== Formation ==
In March 1947, the first Pan-Malayan Islamic conference was held at Madrasah Ma'ahad al-Ehya as-Sharif, Gunung Semanggol, Perak. The conference was organized by the Parti Kebangsaan Melayu Malaya (PKMM) led by Dr. Burhanuddin al-Helmy to discuss the economy problem faced by the Malay-Muslim. It aim to bring together the Islamic thinkers and movements to be more politically active and progressive. As a result, the Supreme Religious Council of Malaya or Majlis Agama Tertinggi Malaya (MATA) was formally formed.

MATA organised a political conference from 13–16 March 1948 discussing local and international issues concerning the community. The conference participants felt United Malays National Organisation (UMNO) did not do enough to present the important issues and the conservative-nationalist also did not do their parts for the Malay-Muslim sake. The UMNO representatives were dissatisfied with the Islamist in MATA who were more revolutionist and militant. The UMNO representatives reported to UMNO leader Dato' Onn Jaafar who gave the warning of "the dangerous threat from the mountain" ("ancaman bahaya dari gunung"), referring to Gunung Semanggol, the location of MATA movement.

Eventually the Parti Orang Muslimin Malaya or Hizbul Muslimin was formed on 17 March 1948 led by Ustaz Abu Bakar al-Baqir after the second MATA conference which declared for MATA to be arranged back as an Islamic political party. With the formation of Hizbul Muslimin, all political activities was transferred to the new party. MATA would be the party's religious affairs bureau. However, Hizbul Muslimin existed not for long when it was banned by the British government by claiming it having relation with the illegal Communist Party of Malaya (CPM). The approval of Emergency Ordinance 1948 had caused Hizbul Muslimin to be considered as dangerous and out-law. It ceased to exist after several of its leaders were arrested during the Malayan Emergency.

== Dissolution aftermath ==
Many members of Hizbul Muslimin escaped from the British actions by joining UMNO. When the ulama group in UMNO split from the party, they formed Persatuan Islam Sa-Malaya (Pan-Malayan Islamic Association), with the abbreviation PAS, which was also used by its successors, the Pan-Malayan Islamic Party (PMIP) and the Pan-Malaysian Islamic Party (PAS). At the time, the organisation's constitution allowed dual membership in both UMNO and PAS until 1954.

== See also ==
- Politics of Malaysia
- List of political parties in Malaysia
