= Convent Bukit Nanas =

All-girls school in Kuala Lumpur, Malaysia

Coordinates: 3°09′09.9″N 101°42′03.5″E

- Sekolah Menengah Kebangsaan Convent Bukit Nanas புக்கிட் நானாஸ் கான்வென்ட் தேசிய உயர்நிலைப் பள்ளி (Pukkiṭ nāṉās kāṉveṉṭ tēciya uyarnilaip paḷḷi)
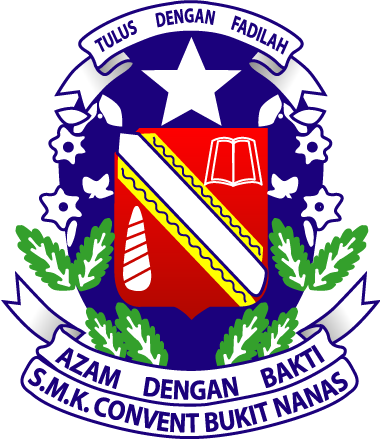
- Kuala Lumpur; Malaysia

Information
- Type: all-girls primary and secondary School
- Motto: Simple in Virtue, Steadfast in Duty
- Religious affiliation: Catholic
- Established: 1899
- Grades: Form 1 - 5
- Gender: Female
- Feeder schools: SK Convent Bukit Nanas 1 SK Convent Bukit Nanas 2
- Affiliations: Malaysia Ministry Of Education
- Abbreviation: CBN
- Website: cbn.edu.my

S.M.K. Convent Bukit Nanas (CBN) is an all-girls school located at Bukit Nanas, Kuala Lumpur, Malaysia. Established in 1899, it is one of the oldest schools in Malaysia, and is one of 30 convent secondary schools in Malaysia. CBN was one of the first schools to be distinguished as a Cluster School of Excellence by the Malaysian Ministry of Education, and has a close relationship with her brother school, St John's Institution, which is located along the same road and is also a Cluster School of Excellence.

On 16 December 2008, Pos Malaysia issued a premium set of four commemorative stamps and first-day cover, honouring four Premier Schools of Malaysia: Convent Bukit Nanas and Victoria Institution in Kuala Lumpur, SMK St. Thomas in Kuching, and SM All Saints in Kota Kinabalu, Sabah for their superiority in academics, sports and extra-curricular activities.

== History ==
=== Establishment and growth ===
The school was established in 1899 by three sisters of the Congregation of the Holy Infant Jesus: Reverend Mother St Levine, accompanied by Sisters St Sabine and St Madeleine, who had arrived on a steamship anchored at Port Swettenham with a mission to establish a school in Kuala Lumpur. The first convent school was located in Nyonya Ah Yok's garden shed, and the sisters lived on the first floor of her country house by the River Gombak on Ampang Road, directly opposite Bukit Nanas, the current site of the Kuala Lumpur Tower. On 1 March 1899, the fee-paying convent school opened with a dozen children, many of whom were the children of immigrants working on the railway lines. Mother St Levine was murdered in the same month that the school was opened. By the second year there were 60 day pupils and the sisters were operating an orphanage on the site.

Towkay Goh Ah Ngee gave temporary residence to the sisters and the pupils at his house in Semenyih. He also approached the government for approval to start a lottery to enable the sisters to buy Victoria Hotel in Brickfields, once the venue of annual general meetings of the United Planters' Association. Towkay Goh Ah Ngee, as one of the benefactors of the convent, continued to help the Sisters, also providing a carriage and pony for their grocery shopping. On 15 January 1901, the school moved into Victoria Hotel, consisting of Reverend Mother St. André, 17 sisters, 60 orphans and a school for 22 boarders and 100 day pupils, as well as a creche for 12 babies. The number of pupils at the school increased rapidly, and by 1911, there were 308 children, prompting the Inspector of Schools to recommend that new classrooms be built.

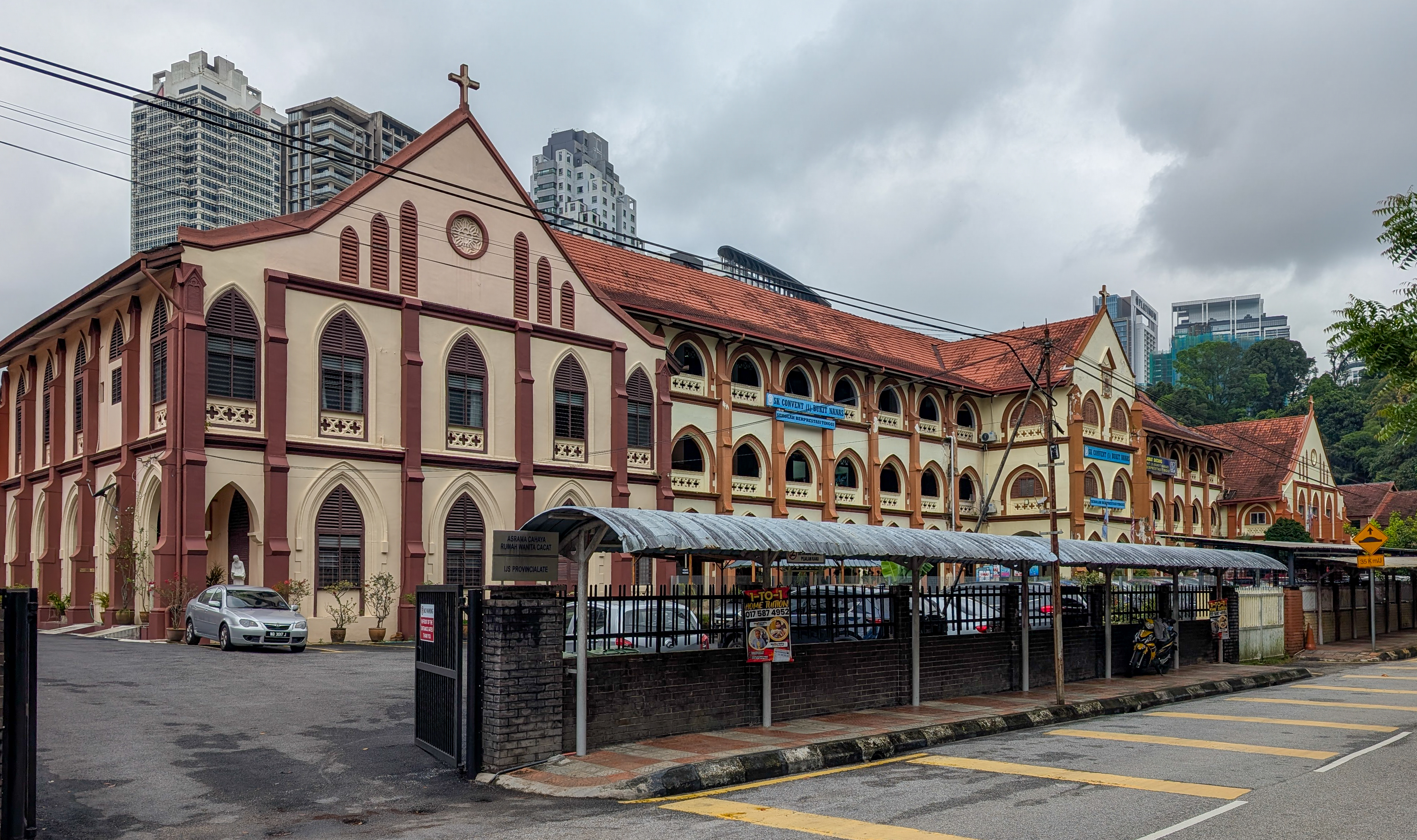
School building

The pupils wore a convent uniform for the first time in 1904, a blue skirt and white blouse), sewn by Sisters Lawrence and Marie. Some of the boys left for the newly opened St. John's Institution. Rev Mother St André was transferred to Taiping Convent in 1907, after a recuperative period in France.

Convent Bukit Nanas was opened officially by Edward Lewis Brockman, Chief Secretary to the Federated Malay States, on 2 December 1912. Brockman said in his opening address that he felt confident of the Sister's ability to raise the $26,000 that would be required to pay for the school building and extension. Their benefactors knew that the money would be 'well lid out' for besides 'offering a sound education to children of all classes and creeds', the sisters cared for orphans, of whom there were 108 in the convent at the time.

=== World War II (1941-1945) ===
Following the Japanese invasion of Malaysia in December 1941, CBN became a temporary sanctuary for many more orphans and abandoned babies, and hundreds of civilian refugees. The sisters grew vegetables on two acres in Kajang, drew water from a well in the courtyard, and looked after 400 refugees throughout the Japanese occupation. 33 Holy Infant Jesus Sisters of Malaya and Singapore died during the war. The sisters continued writing their Annals entries. The school re-opened after the war on 15 September 1945.

In 1957, in response to a lack of teachers in the country, the Sisters acquired The Nazareth, once the house of the Chief Justice, to use as a teacher training college. In the next 12 years, Nazareth trained over 300 teachers, who went on to teach at Convent Bukit Nanas and 50 other convents across the Peninsula. After 1970, Nazareth became the Sixth Form Wing of Convent Bukit Nanas.

The school magazine, Marguerite, had its first edition in 1968, and is published annually.

== Academics and curriculum ==
CBN comprises a secondary school and two primary schools. Administration of the secondary and primary schools separated in 1958. CBN has classes from Form 1 through to Form 5 for girls aged 12 to 17. Girls enter CBN after they have completed their primary education in SRK Convent Bukit Nanas I and SRK Convent Bukit Nanas II. These primary schools have classes from Year 1 through Year 6 for girls aged 7 to 12.

The CBN secondary school administers two national Malaysian exams, the PT3 (Pentaksiran Tingkatan 3), and Sijil Pelajaran Malaysia(SPM). PT3 is taken by students at the Form 3 level to determine placement into science, art or commerce courses. However, most girls at CBN complete the SPM at Form 5 to pursue other pre-university courses like the A-Levels. As a result, SPM is seen as the most important exam for Malaysian high school students.

== Notable alumni ==
- Adibah Noor - Singer, actress and social activist
- Vanida Imran - Actress, model and television host
- Tuanku Aishah Rohani - Consort to the Yang di-Pertuan Besar of Negeri Sembilan, Tuanku Muhriz ibni Tuanku Munawir
- Raja Eleena - fourth child of the Sultan of Perak, Sultan Azlan Shah and a lawyer with her own legal firm in Kuala Lumpur
- Sweet Qismina - Malaysian actress and singer
- Tengku Permaisuri Norashikin -Tengku Permaisuri of Selangor and consort of the 9th Sultan of Selangor, Sultan Sharafuddin Idris Shah
- Nor Shamsiah Mohd Yunus - former governor of the Central Bank of Malaysia
- Poh Ling Yeow - Malaysian-born Australian cook, artist, actress, author and television presenter
- Rafidah Aziz - Minister of International Trade and Industry from 1987 to 2008
- Tunku Puan Zanariah - Sultanah of Johor and Raja Permaisuri Agong VIII
- Nori Abdullah - Founding member of the Puteri UMNO Malaysia, chairman and board of trustees of Yayasan Budi Penyayang Malaysia (PENYAYANG)
- Ambiga Sreenevasan - Lawyer and human rights advocate
- Low Ngai Yuen - Actor, film, and theatre director
- Zabrina Fernandez - television producer and director
- Moi Meng Ling - Professor, the University of Tokyo, virologist
