= Apurva Sanghi =

Lead economist at the World Bank (born 1970)

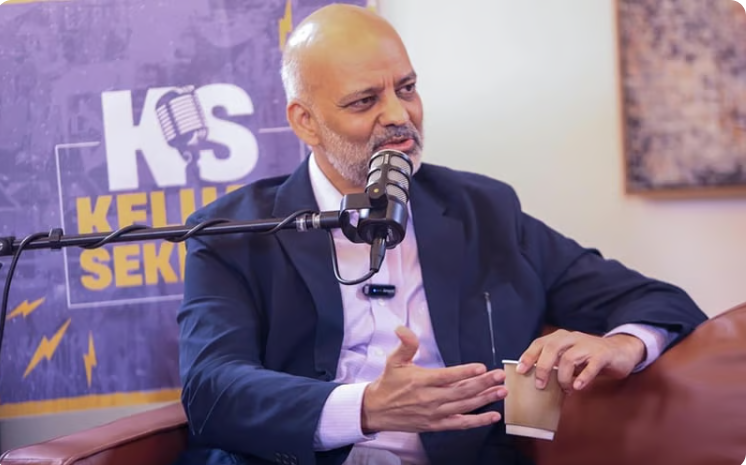
- Born: Apurva Sanghi; January 15, 1970 (age 56); Lucknow, India
- Education: University of Chicago (Phd); University of California, Los Angeles (UCLA) (BS & BA)
- Occupation: Economist
- Employer: World Bank

Apurva Sanghi (born January 15, 1970) is an economist and currently holds the role of lead economist at the World Bank. Throughout his two decade career at the World Bank, he has held important economist roles in various countries including Singapore, Kenya, Russia and most recently Malaysia. Sanghi has worked in the private sector and also taught economics at the University of Chicago, Thammasat University (Bangkok) and Russia's MGIMO University.

== Early life and education ==
Sanghi was born on January 15, 1970, in Lucknow, Uttar Pradesh, in India. He then spent the majority of his early life living in various places in the Indian subcontinent.

At the age of 18, Sanghi relocated to the United States where he double majored in physics and business-economics at the University of California (UCLA). He obtained his PhD in economics from the University of Chicago. During his PhD, Sanghi was part of a joint University of Chicago and TDRI team in Bangkok, conducting surveys in over 40 Thai villages to advise the government on agricultural diversification. His PhD dissertation was on the economics of climate change. It showed that farmers in developing countries would not remain helpless in the face of climate change as they would adapt by shifting to higher-value, climate-suitable crops, suggesting climate damage would be less severe than previously estimated.

Sanghi was also a visiting fellow at Yale University.

== Career ==
In 1998, Sanghi secured his first job in the private sector in Washington DC, working on restructuring and privatization of utilities in the US, Latin America and South Asia for an economics consulting firm. He joined the World Bank in 2000 to work on the World Bank's first private sector development strategy. He moved to Singapore where he led the Asia regional operations of the World Bank-PPIAF. Upon returning to Washington DC with the World Bank, Sanghi led an inter-disciplinary World Bank-United Nations team that published the first major analysis on the economics of disasters, endorsed by several Nobel economist laureates. He was a lead author of the Intergovernmental Panel on Climate Change (IPCC)'s Special Report on Managing the Risks of Extreme Events and Disasters to Advance Climate Change Adaptation.

In 2012, Sanghi began his first role in Africa as the World Bank's lead economist for Kenya, Rwanda, Uganda, and Eritrea. Based in Nairobi, Sanghi was the first to estimate how much each Kenyan county contributes to national growth. His work later earned recognition from Forbes and others, for his efforts at fixing misleading GDP figures.

Sanghi delivered a live TEDx talk from the Kakuma Refugee Camp in Kenya in 2018. His talk balanced the strain of refugee presence, for example, on the local environment with the economic benefits of refugee presence. He also frequently spoke and wrote about Kenyan growth challenges, and the emergence of the Kenyan oil market, emphasizing challenges and potential to transform the country's economy.

Sanghi co-authored the World Bank policy research working paper with Dylan Johnson titled "Deal or No Deal: Strictly Business for China in Kenya?" in 2016. The paper critically examined China's economic presence in Kenya, challenging prevailing myths and offering nuanced insights into the bilateral relationship. While in Africa, Sanghi co-authored an op-ed with Nobelist Nobelist Kenneth J. Arrow which drew attention to harnessing the role of technology and incentives to improve health outcomes in Africa and elsewhere.

Sanghi began his role as the World Bank's lead economist for the Russian Federation in 2016. During his time based in Moscow, he was interviewed frequently on Russia's economic performance and policy challenges. He has spoken publicly about the use of sanctions and how oil price shocks have dwarfed sanctions shocks. Sanghi wrote a running Forbes column in Russian, which became popular with Russian citizens. He was also a guest lecturer at Russia's MGIMO University in 2018. At the 2019 Vladivostok Economic Forum, he spoke about how China's slowdown and India's rapid growth could affect Russia's economy. Sanghi highlighted two key challenges in Russia's pivot to the East: the dominance of Russian natural resources in its exports and an unfavorable climate for foreign investment — issues that demand major internal reforms. President Putin discussed these during a plenary session with India's Prime Minister Narendra Modi and Japan's Prime Minister Shinzo Abe.

In 2021, Sanghi became the World Bank's lead economist for Malaysia, based in Kuala Lumpur.

In February 2025, he was invited to speak about cost of living pressures in Malaysia at the Malaysian Cabinet Retreat.

He is known for engaging directly with the Malaysian public on critical economic issues such as through his appearance on Keluar Sekejap, Malaysia's most popular podcast, where he was the first economist and foreigner to be on it. Elsewhere, Sanghi has been vocal about Malaysia's economic challenges but also its significant progress in reducing poverty. He noted that the percentage of Malaysians living in poverty has decreased substantially, lifting over 14 million people out of poverty since the country's independence.
