= Khairy Jamaluddin =

Malaysian politician

Khairy Jamaluddin PAT PPA
- خيري جمال الدين
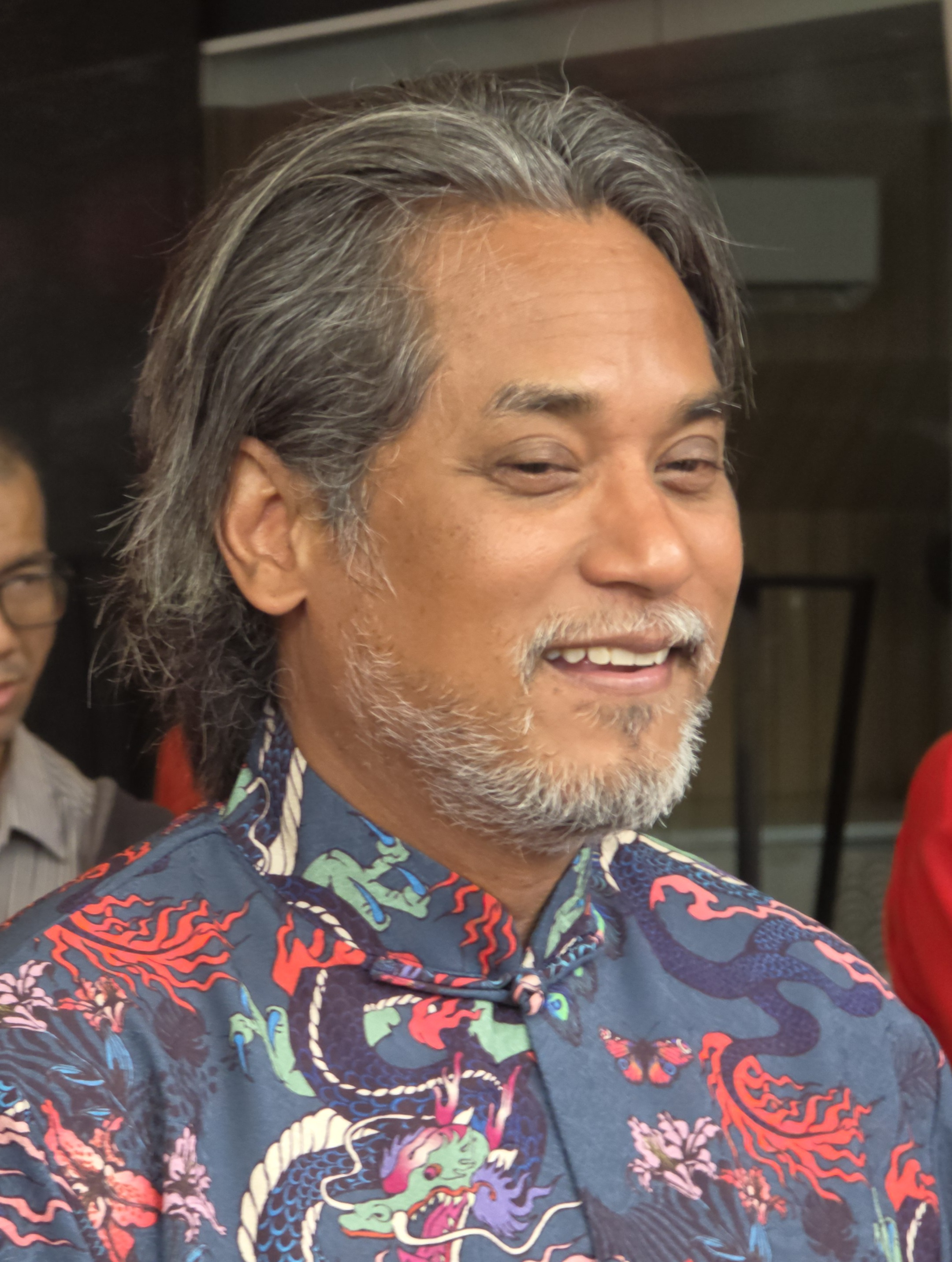
- Khairy in 2026

13th Youth Chief of the United Malays National Organisation
- In office 26 March 2008 – 24 June 2018
- President: Abdullah Ahmad Badawi; Najib Razak
- Deputy: Razali Ibrahim (2008–2013); Khairul Azwan Harun (2013–2018)
- Preceded by: Hishammuddin Hussein
- Succeeded by: Asyraf Wajdi Dusuki

Member of the Malaysian Parliament for Rembau
- In office 8 March 2008 – 19 November 2022
- Preceded by: Firdaus Muhammad Rom Harun (BN–UMNO)
- Succeeded by: Mohamad Hasan (BN–UMNO)
- Majority: 5,746 (2008); 18,357 (2013); 4,368 (2018)

Ministerial portfolios
- 2013–2018: Minister of Youth and Sports
- 2020–2021: Minister of Science, Technology and Innovation
- 2021: Coordinating Minister for the National COVID-19 Immunisation Program
- 2021–2022: Minister of Health

Personal details
- Born: Khairy Jamaluddin Abu Bakar; 10 January 1976 (age 50) Kuwait City, Kuwait
- Citizenship: Malaysia
- Party: UMNO (2000–2023, 2026–present); Independent (2023–2026)
- Other political affiliations: Barisan Nasional (2000–2023, 2026–present)
- Spouse: Nori Abdullah (m. 2001)
- Relations: Abdullah Ahmad Badawi (father-in-law); Kamaluddin Abdullah (brother-in-law); Shaziman Abu Mansor (first cousin)
- Children: 3
- Parents: Jamaluddin Abu Bakar (father); Rahmah Abdul Hamid (mother)
- Education: United World College of South East Asia
- Alma mater: St Hugh's College, Oxford (BA); University College London (MA)
- Occupation: Politician; radio presenter; podcaster; blogger
- Profession: Journalist
- Nickname(s): KJ, (Note: The abbreviation for his name, Khairy Jamaluddin.); Mat Bangla, (Note: Full name as Ahmad Khairy Jamal Udeen Chowdhury.); Tall, Dark and Handsome

Military service
- Branch/service: Malaysian Army; Territorial Army Regiment
- Years of service: 2010–2018
- Rank: Brigadier General
- Unit: Rejimen AW 508
- Sports career
- Country: Malaysia
- Sport: Polo
Medal record
Polo
Representing Malaysia
SEA Games
Gold medal – first place	2017 Kuala Lumpur	Team
- Khairy Jamaluddin on Facebook; Khairy Jamaluddin on Parliament of Malaysia

Khairy Jamaluddin Abu Bakar (Jawi: خيري جمال الدين ابو بكر, Malay pronunciation: [xai̯ɾi dʒamaluden]; born 10 January 1976), also known as KJ, is a Malaysian politician, blogger, journalist, radio host and podcaster.

Beginning a career in journalism, Khairy became involved in politics after marrying Nori Abdullah, the daughter of prime minister Abdullah Ahmad Badawi, in 2001. A longtime member of the United Malays National Organisation (UMNO), he acted as an adviser in Badawi's office and was the MP for Rembau from 2008 to 2022, and led the party’s youth wing from 2008 to 2018. He served as Minister of Youth and Sports from 2013 to 2018 under Najib Razak. Following the 2020 political crisis, he joined the Perikatan Nasional government. He became Minister of Science, Technology and Innovation under Muhyiddin Yassin from 2020 to 2021. During the COVID-19 pandemic, he was appointed as the Coordinating Minister for the National COVID-19 Immunisation Program (PICK). He served as the Minister of Health from August 2021 to November 2022 under Prime Minister Ismail Sabri Yaakob. In the 2022 general election, Khairy unsuccessfully contested the Sungai Buloh seat and was expelled from UMNO in 2023.

He is currently a presenter on Hot FM and co-hosts the political podcast Keluar Sekejap with Shahril Hamdan.

== Early life and education ==
Khairy Jamaluddin Abu Bakar was born in Kuwait City, Kuwait. He is the only son of a former diplomat, Dato' Jamaluddin bin Abu Bakar, a Malay of Minangkabau descent and Datin Dato' Rahmah binti Abdul Hamid, an ethnic Malay housewife of Kedahan ancestry. His father was a senior diplomatic officer in the Ministry of Foreign Affairs, retiring as the Malaysian High Commissioner to the United Kingdom. He died of throat cancer. Khairy's mother, Rahmah Abdul Hamid, has been heavily involved in volunteer work throughout her life although she was a housewife and never had an employment history, whilst his late paternal grandfather, Abu Bakar, was a community leader in his hometown of Kampung Kota, Rembau.

Khairy had his secondary education at the United World College of South East Asia in Singapore and furthered his tertiary studies at Oxford University and University College London (UCL) in the United Kingdom. While at Oxford, he studied at St Hugh's College, and graduated with a bachelor's degree in Philosophy, Politics, and Economics (PPE). In 1998, he completed his master's degree in Legal and Political Theory at UCL.

== Early career (1998–2008) ==
After leaving university, Khairy worked as a journalist for a period. He served as a presenter on the talkshow Dateline Malaysia. He also had a stint working for The Economist in 1999. Thereafter, Khairy became a Special Officer in the office of Abdullah Ahmad Badawi, who was then the Deputy Prime Minister of Malaysia. He was Abdullah's Deputy Principal Private Secretary from 2003 to 2004.

He was selected as a Young Global Leader by the World Economic Forum in Davos, Switzerland. He has written for major publications including The Economist, Time and the Wall Street Journal.

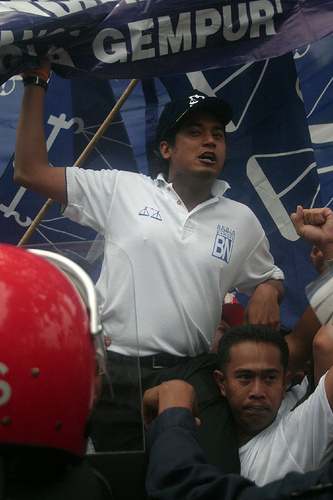
Deputy youth chief of Barisan Nasional, Khairy Jamaluddin on the nomination day for the Ijok by-election in 2007.

He became closely involved in football during his pre-parliamentary career. He holds a number of high-profile positions in the Malaysian football scene, and is involved in a number of football-related associations. In 2006, Khairy teamed-up with radio DJ Jason Lo (with whom he attended high school in Singapore) to produce the football-based reality TV show MyTeam.

== Rise to prominence (2008–2013) ==
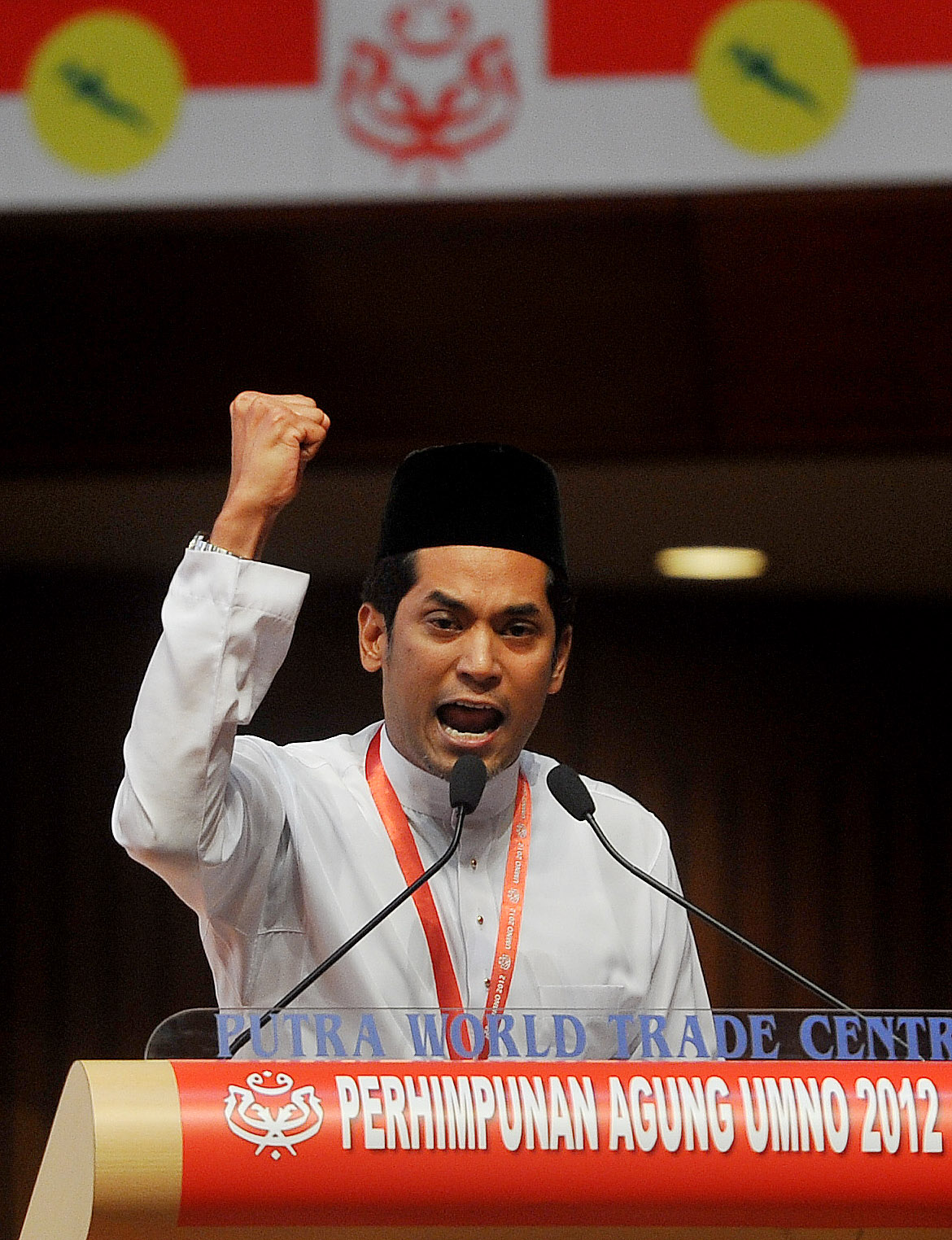
UMNO Youth chief, Khairy Jamaluddin during UMNO General Assembly.

Under the prime ministership of his father-in-law (2003–2009), Khairy became well-known within UMNO and Malaysian politics generally. He became the deputy chief of UMNO's youth wing and served as a close personal adviser to Abdullah. Khairy's perceived influence on Abdullah was criticised by many including Abdullah's predecessor Mahathir Mohamad. On this allegation, Khairy replied that "I am a pretty easy scapegoat. [But] the decisions Dr. Mahathir is unhappy with are entirely made by the Prime Minister and the cabinet."

On 9 September 2007, Khairy was chosen uncontested as the Vice-president of the Football Association of Malaysia (FAM) during the 44th FAM Congress, to serve from 2007 to 2010, replacing Tengku Mahkota Pahang then, Tengku Abdullah Sultan Ahmad Shah.

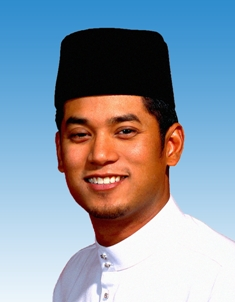
Khairy Jamaluddin's parliamentary portrait.

In the 2008 general election, Khairy was elected to the federal Parliament for the seat of Rembau in the state of Negeri Sembilan. The following year he was elected as the Chief of UMNO Youth, defeating Khir Toyo and Mukhriz Mahathir.

In his first term in parliament, Khairy involved himself in contentious policy debates. He expressed his view that Malaysia should repeal the Printing Presses and Publications Act, and abolish the annual Home Ministry licensing requirement, through the creation of an independent body which will enforce a self-regulatory mechanism of the system similar to the United Kingdom's Press Complaints Commission. He also spoke against the Malaysian Communications and Multimedia Commission's blocking of the popular and often anti-government website Malaysia Today, citing that the move was a "blatant and crude employment of state power" and "is inconsistent with the widening roads of democratic highways." He also called for an end to the Mahathir-era policy of teaching science and math in English. In September 2008, Khairy called for the reversal of the policy, citing that the policy had failed and only caused burden to students. He regularly debated non-government and opposition figures in public, including Ambiga Sreenevasan on the transparency of the Election Commission of Malaysia (EC), and senior Parti Keadilan Rakyat (PKR) leader, and close Anwar Ibrahim ally, Rafizi Ramli on higher education loans.

In 2010, Khairy signed-up the Rejimen Askar Wataniah or Territorial Army as a reservist after completing one month of basics recruit training in Negeri Sembilan and Johor in May 2010. He then completed a five-week basic static parachuting course conducted by the Army's Special Warfare Centre with 78 others to earn his paratrooper jump wings in February 2011. In January 2014, he was appointed as the Commander of the 508 Territorial Army Regiment located in Rasah, Negeri Sembilan. On 26 October 2016, Khairy was elevated from the rank of 'Colonel' to 'Brigadier-General' effective 14 January 2015. This makes him the first Cabinet minister to be a commissioned reserved military officer rank after going through various courses conducted by the Territorial Army, and he continues to lead the 508 Territorial Army Regiment until his resignation in 2018 after the GE14 quoting his presence was no longer welcomed.

== Ministership, COVID-19 pandemic and expulsion from UMNO (2013–2023) ==
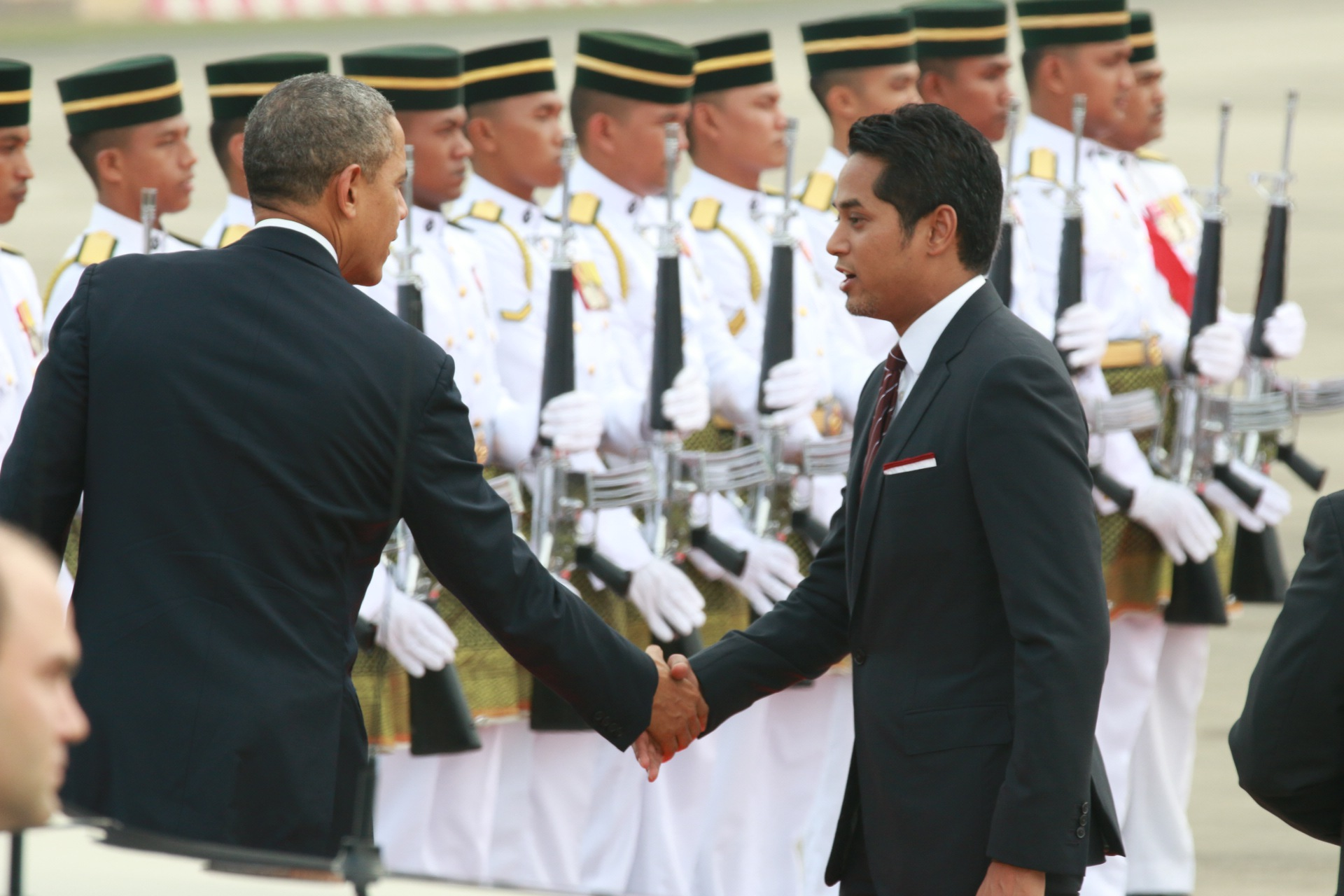
Khairy with the 44th President of the United States, Barack Obama during his state visit in Malaysia on 27 April 2014

After retaining his parliamentary seat in the 2013 general election, Prime Minister Najib Razak elevated Khairy to the Cabinet as Minister for Youth and Sports. Later in 2013, he was re-elected to the presidency of UMNO Youth.

During his ministerial post, Malaysia successfully hosted the 2017 SEA Games and emerged as the overall gold medals tally winner. Just before the 2018 general election (GE14), Khairy and his ministry was put in charge of Najib's launched Transformasi Nasional 2050 (TN50) concept but it had somehow fallen through due to the GE14 results, which saw the downfall of the BN federal government. Khairy also lost his cabinet position despite retaining his parliamentary seat.

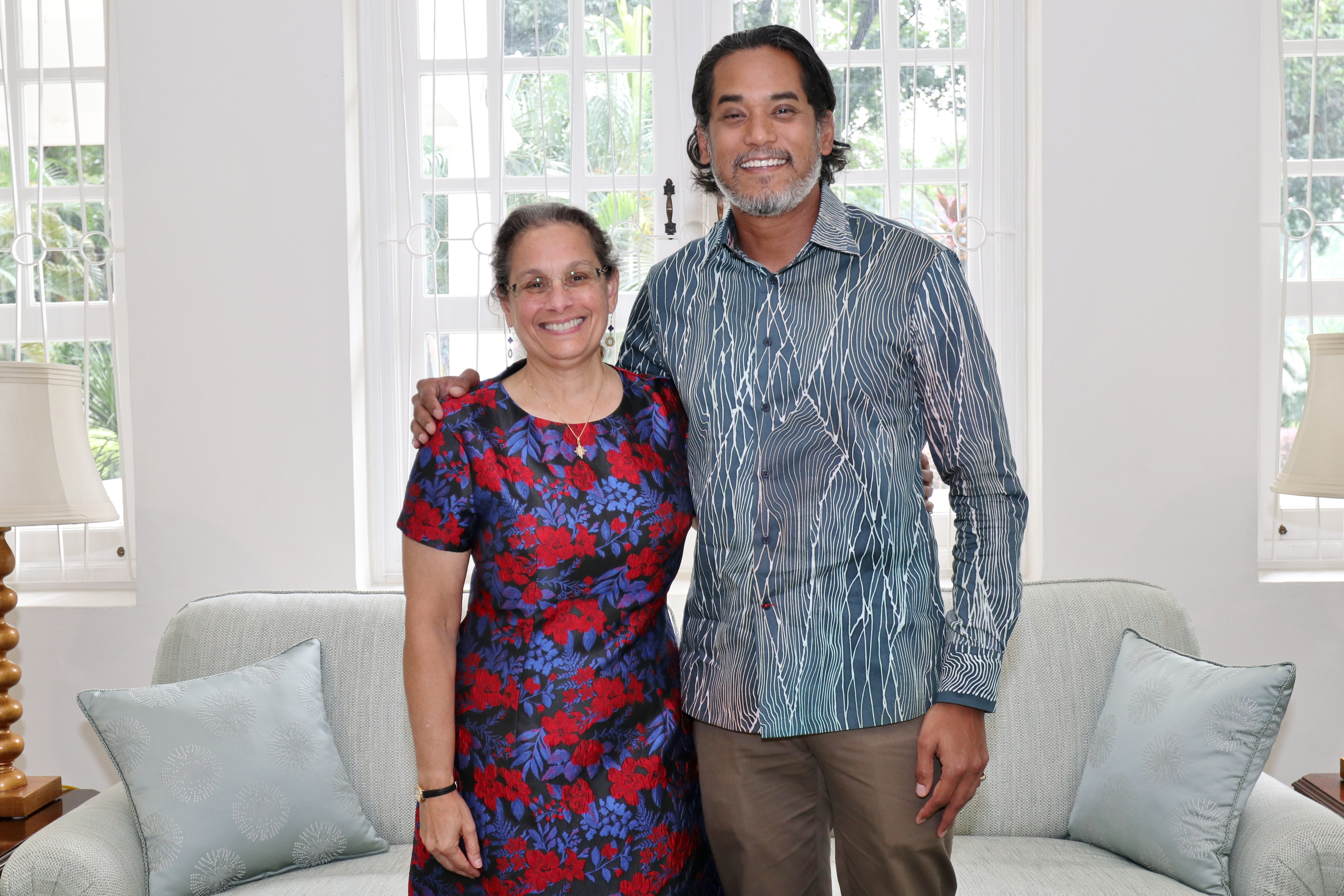
Khairy Jamaluddin met with Ambassador Kamala Shirin Lakhdhir, circa 2019.

When Najib's statement attributing BN's loss in the GE14 to Pakatan Harapan's false promises, Khairy wrote: “We lost because of 1MDB. The End.” On 19 November 2018, he said Umno members should accept the reality of the 1Malaysia Development Berhad scandal, as denials will continue to hurt the party.

Khairy returned to Cabinet in March 2020 to serve as Minister of Science, Technology, and Innovation under new Prime Minister Muhyiddin Yassin's administration led by Perikatan Nasional (PN) following the Sheraton Move. His appointment as Minister of MOSTI was during the COVID-19 pandemic in Malaysia. He has signed an agreement with China for Malaysia to be given priority access to COVID-19 vaccines developed in China. In February 2021, Khairy was appointed as the Coordinating Minister for the National COVID-19 Immunisation Program. He led the Special Task Force to manage the implementation of the vaccination process.

During the 2022 Malaysian general election, Khairy was sent by his UMNO party leaders to contest Sungai Buloh parliamentary seat, he lost to Parti Keadilan Rakyat candidate Ramanan Ramakrishnan by a narrow margin.

In the aftermath of the 2022 Malaysian general election, Khairy and several UMNO leaders called for party leader, deputy prime minister Ahmad Zahid Hamidi to resign. On 27 January 2023, he was sacked from the party by the UMNO supreme council, a month before 2023 UMNO leadership election, where he was speculated to fight against Ahmad Zahid again on UMNO president seat after losing in 2018.

== Interim years and Keluar Sekejap (2023–2026) ==
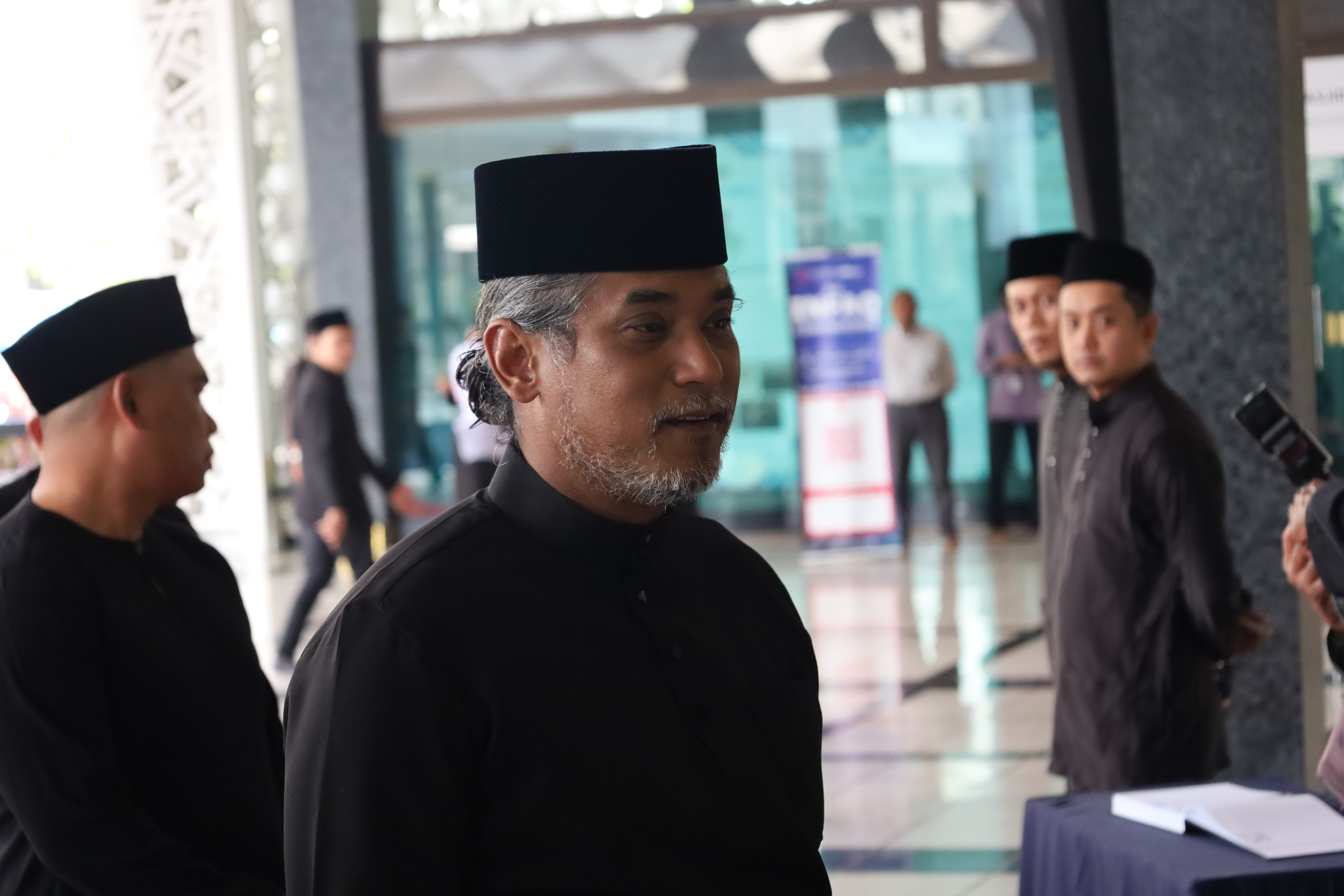
Khairy in his father-in-law's funeral on 14 April 2025.

Following his expulsion from UMNO, Khairy debuted as a radio host for a local radio station, Hot FM, in its Bekpes Hot morning segment. He also started producing a weekly political podcast, Keluar Sekejap with Shahril Hamdan. The podcast has featured a string of prominent local politicians including Muhammad Sanusi Md Nor, Amirudin Shari, Azmin Ali and Mahathir Mohamad.

On 14 April 2025, he announced that the 5th Prime Minister of Malaysia and his father-in-law, Abdullah Ahmad Badawi died at the age of 85, following complications from multi-organ failure, at the National Heart Institute (IJN) in Titiwangsa, Kuala Lumpur. The next day, he co-led the Abdullah's state funeral with his brother-in-law, Kamaluddin Abdullah. He has served and accompanied several VVIP guests who were attending at the state funeral, including Mahathir Mohamad, Najib Razak and Lee Hsien Loong.

On 30 October 2025, Khairy is reported to be returning to UMNO before the Sabah state election on November 29 after he has received the 'approval' of UMNO's top leadership, especially party president Ahmad Zahid Hamidi. The approval signal was conveyed by Zahid to Khairy when the deputy prime minister attended the wedding of the daughter of Perlis UMNO Chairman, Rozabil Abdul Rahman. At the meeting, Zahid himself informed Khairy that he should send his membership form to return to UMNO. Khairy was also being considered to be nominated as a BN candidate in the upcoming 16th Malaysian General Election to represent the Kepala Batas parliamentary constituency. The parliament is the traditional constituency of his father-in-law, Abdullah Ahmad Badawi, which was held by Reezal Merican Naina Merican until PAS won the seat in the previous general election by Siti Mastura Muhammad. Reezal, who is currently the Election Director of UMNO and state assemblyman for Bertam which is a state constituency within Kepala Batas, expressed his support for KJ's return.

== Return to UMNO (2026–present) ==
Khairy submitted his an appeal letter to rejoin UMNO to the President of UMNO, Ahmad Zahid Hamidi on 15 March 2026 under the initiative of "Rumah Bangsa". On 17 April 2026, it was reported that UMNO officially opened its doors for the return of Khairy, along with other suspended/expelled members, such as Hishammuddin Hussein and Syed Hamid Albar.

== Controversies and issues ==
=== Alleged influence in Abdullah's administration ===
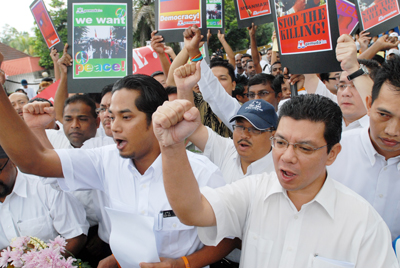
Khairy Jamaluddin and Saifuddin Abdullah (in the right front) at the Myanmar anti-genocide rally in 2007.

Khairy was alleged to be running the country government through his control of the 'Fourth Floor Boys' – a group of young professionals who manned the policy-making unit of the PM's office when his father-in-law, Abdullah Ahmad Badawi was Prime Minister between October 2003 to April 2009. Khairy amidst then was a political novice with no experience in government himself even held the posts of ‘special officer’ and Deputy Principal Private Secretary (2003–2004) in the Prime Minister's Office (PMO).

=== ECM Libra stock purchase scandal ===
After resigning from the PMO in 2004, Khairy joined a merchant bank, ECM Libra. In 2005, one year after Abdullah became prime minister, Khairy helped in the merger between ECM Libra Capital Bhd and the Malaysian government-owned company, Avenue Capital Resources Bhd. A year later, around 2006, the three founding members of ECM Libra—Lim Kian Onn, Kalimullah Masheerul Hassan, and David Chua—announced that they were each selling 1% of the company shares they owned to Khairy. The deal was transacted at 71 cents per share for a total of approximately US$2.6 million, where Khairy was able to finance it through a soft loan from the founders.

=== Allegation of bribery ===
In 2009 UMNO leadership election, Khairy contested as a candidate for the new UMNO Youth chief after his predecessor, Hishammuddin Hussein relinquished his position. He was rivalled by Mukhriz Mahathir and Khir Toyo. However, a controversy was sparked when Khairy was allowed to contest for the post even though he was found guilty for being involved with money politics by the UMNO Disciplinary Board, while others who were found guilty for the same offence, such as Mohd Ali Rustam who was supposed to contest for the UMNO Vice President post, were not allowed to contest for their respective posts. However, Khairy denied the allegation, as stated in his blog.

=== Racist remarks ===
In August 2006, The Star reported that an Indo-Chinese daily quoted that several leaders criticising Khairy for allegedly saying that non-Malays would take advantage of a weak UMNO to make demands. To this, Khairy said that "Leaders from the other parties may have misinterpreted my statement." He further said that “A weak UMNO would lead to various parties making demands and this could affect unity in the Barisan”, and referred to the issues raised by the Chinese election watch group, Su Qiu in the 1999 elections by saying that “UMNO was weak at that time and people took advantage of that.”

There was an incident in 2014, where Khairy made a controversial statement that some interpreted as insensitive toward Malaysia's Chinese community. At that time, Khairy, who was the Youth and Sports Minister in Malaysia, made a comment during a political speech in which he seemed to downplay the significance of the Chinese community's contribution to Malaysia's independence.

=== Youth and Sports Ministry corruption scandal ===
In 2016, Khairy was slammed over his responsibility as he embroiled in the controversy surrounding the RM100 million corruption scandal plaguing the Youth and Sports Ministry he led when a senior official who had allegedly to have covertly siphoned off the ministry's funds and lived a lavish lifestyle over the past six years was arrested by the Malaysian Anti-Corruption Commission (MACC).

=== Participation in 2017 SEA Games ===
Khairy controversially competed for the Malaysian polo team at the 2017 Kuala Lumpur SEA Games he was encharged as Minister for Youth and Sports himself albeit the team secured a gold medal in the men's team polo event winning over Thailand. Somehow his credibility and contribution of the national polo team were questioned and had raised the dissatisfaction from Sultan Ibrahim Sultan Iskandar who even challenged him to play against his Johor state polo team. The event had led to Khairy seeking and granted an audience with the sultan at the palace to resolve the predicament caused immediately.

=== Feud with Lokman Noor Adam ===
Khairy and Lokman Noor Adam clashed around 2018 because of Lokman Noor defended former prime minister Najib Razak. This dispute caused Khairy to nickname Lokman Noor as "Lobakman". The name of this title comes from Khairy's twitter account tweet against him in 2018 which called him having an extremely low intelligence quotient (IQ). The post reads: "You better pray I don't become the president of UMNO. First thing I'll do is sack you for having the IQ of a carrot." However, in the 2018 UMNO leadership election, Khairy lost to Ahmad Zahid Hamidi for the position of the UMNO president while Lokman Noor won the position of member of the UMNO National Supreme Council.

=== Allegation of phantom voters ===
During 2022 UMNO general assembly, Sungai Besar UMNO division chief, Jamal Yunos accused Khairy of attempting to bring "phantom voters" to the assembly. However, the statement was denied vehemently by Khairy. He added that the statement portrayed him as "lacking integrity and credibility, involved in corruption for personal gain, causing him to lose business opportunities and public trust." He later filed a defamation suit against Jamal at the Kuala Lumpur High Court on 24 May 2023 and demanded compensation of RM1 million.

=== Allegations of operational disconnect ===
In January 2025, former Health Minister Khairy criticized the Administrative and Diplomatic Officer or PTDs for being detached from the practical realities of hospital operations, suggesting they were overly reliant on data analysis without understanding on-the-ground challenges. The Administrative and Diplomatic Officers Alumni Association (PPTD) swiftly rebutted these claims, asserting that the PTDs collaborate closely with professionals in the health sector to develop balanced and sustainable policies.

== Personal life ==
"The story [or rumour] that links me with Maya Karin is a slander. I swear to God (Allah), I have only one wife, [which is] Nori binti Abdullah. I hold to the TTP principle, which is "I don't even want to" ("Tak Teringin Pun"). Anyone who says that I'm married [to Maya], please try to provide the proof, [like] showing me my marriage certificate with Maya."

— Khairy, 2006

Khairy is the son-in-law of the fifth Malaysian Prime Minister Abdullah Ahmad Badawi (1939–2025). In October 2001, he married Nori Abdullah (born 1976), the daughter of Abdullah, and his first wife, Endon Mahmood (1940–2005). The couple have three sons, Jibreil Ali Khairy (born 2007), Timor Abdullah Khairy (born 2008) and Raif Averroes Khairy (born 2015). In April 2016, Khairy opened up about his second son, Timor Abdullah who has autism spectrum disorder (ASD).

Around mid-2006, there was a rumour that Khairy and Maya Karin, a Malaysian film actress, television host and singer, were established a close relationship and married in a private ceremony only attended by their close friends. However, Khairy later squashed and denied the rumour that saying he had taken her as his second wife. He also added that he was happy with his one and only wife, Nori.

Apart from his native Malay, Khairy is fluent in English. He is also learning Mandarin. Khairy is a supporter of Manchester United F.C. and once the patron of Manchester United Supporters Club (MUSC) Malaysia.

== Election results ==
Parliament of Malaysia
Year	Constituency	Candidate	Votes	Pct	Opponent(s)	Votes	Pct	Ballots cast	Majority	Turnout
2008	P131 Rembau	Khairy Jamaluddin (UMNO)	26,525	55.47%	Badrul Hisham Shaharin (PKR)	20,779	43.46%	48,901	5,746	77.75%
2013	P131 Rembau	Khairy Jamaluddin (UMNO)	43,053	63.01%	Radzali A. Ghani (PKR)	24,696	36.15%	69,538	18,357	87.29%
2013	P131 Rembau	Khairy Jamaluddin (UMNO)	43,053	63.01%	Abdul Aziz Hassan (IND)	325	0.48%	69,538	18,357	87.29%
2018	P131 Rembau	Khairy Jamaluddin (UMNO)	36,096	48.87%	Roseli Abdul Gani (PKR)	31,732	42.96%	73,856	4,368	83.58%
2018	P131 Rembau	Khairy Jamaluddin (UMNO)	36,096	48.87%	Mustafa Dolah (PAS)	6,028	8.16%	73,856	4,368	83.58%
2022	P107 Sungai Buloh	Khairy Jamaluddin (UMNO)	48,250	37.22%	Ramanan Ramakrishnan (PKR)	50,943	39.30%	129,639	2,693	82.00%
2022	P107 Sungai Buloh	Khairy Jamaluddin (UMNO)	48,250	37.22%	Mohd Ghazali Md Hamin (PAS)	29,060	22.42%	129,639	2,693	82.00%
2022	P107 Sungai Buloh	Khairy Jamaluddin (UMNO)	48,250	37.22%	Mohd Akmal Mohd Yusoff (PEJUANG)	829	0.64%	129,639	2,693	82.00%
2022	P107 Sungai Buloh	Khairy Jamaluddin (UMNO)	48,250	37.22%	Ahmad Jufliz Faiza (PRM)	279	0.22%	129,639	2,693	82.00%
2022	P107 Sungai Buloh	Khairy Jamaluddin (UMNO)	48,250	37.22%	Syed Razak Alsagoff (IND)	165	0.13%	129,639	2,693	82.00%
2022	P107 Sungai Buloh	Khairy Jamaluddin (UMNO)	48,250	37.22%	Nurhaslinda Basri (IND)	113	0.09%	129,639	2,693	82.00%

== Filmography ==
=== Film ===
Year	Title	Role	Notes
2013	Ikal Mayang	Seller	Special appearance
2024	Mak		Short film, special appearance
2026	5 Bomoh	Mr. K	Special appearance

=== Television ===
Year	Title	Role	TV channel	Notes
2011	Beret Hijau (Green Beret)	Himself	TV1	Episode 11

=== Podcast ===
Year	Title	Role	Notes
2023–present	Keluar Sekejap	Host	with Shahril Hamdan

== Radiography ==
=== Radio ===
Year	Title	Station
15 February 2023 – present	Bekpes Hot	Hot FM

== Honours and awards ==
=== Honours of Malaysia ===
- Malaysia
  - Recipient of the General Service Medal (PPA)
  - Recipient of the 15th Yang di-Pertuan Agong Installation Medal (2017)
- Malaysian Armed Forces
  - Warrior of the Most Gallant Order of Military Service (PAT) (2016)

=== Awards ===
Year	Award	Category	Result
2016	Anugerah MeleTOP ERA 2016	Bintang Online MeleTOP	Nominated
2024	Anugerah Bintang Popular Berita Harian ke-36	Popular Radio Presenter	Won
2024	Anugerah Seri Angkasa 2024	Best Male Radio Presenter	Nominated
2025	Anugerah Bintang Popular Berita Harian ke-37	Popular Radio Presenter	Nominated

== See also ==
- Rembau (federal constituency)
- Khairy Chronicles – Khairy Jamaluddin: Rasputin Or Boy-Genius?
