= International School of Kuala Lumpur =

- Sekolah Antarabangsa Kuala Lumpur

Location
- Ampang Hilir Campus, 2, Lorong Kelab Polo Di Raja, 55000 Kuala Lumpur; Malaysia; 3.155787°N 101.740304°E

Information
- Other name: ISKL
- Type: Private international day school
- Established: 1965; 61 years ago
- CEEB code: 686170
- Grades: Prep–12
- Age: 3 to 18–19
- Campus type: Urban
- Mascot: Panther
- Accreditations: Western Association of Schools and Colleges; Council of International Schools
- Website: www.iskl.edu.my

The International School of Kuala Lumpur (ISKL; Malay: Sekolah Antarabangsa Kuala Lumpur) is an American non-profit school in the Kuala Lumpur metropolitan area, Malaysia. The curriculum is international-based, and offers students the chance to earn a High School Diploma, an International Baccalaureate diploma (or certificates), and to attend Advanced Placement programs. It is accredited by the United States–based Western Association of Schools and Colleges (WASC) and internationally through the Council of International Schools (CIS).

The majority of students are from expatriate families seeking a western school system for their children while living abroad. Malaysians seeking an American-based education also attend the school. While the school focuses on a western education system, it also maintains and encourages cultural relations with its host country, giving students the opportunity to participate in a variety of cultural activities.

It has three divisions: elementary school, middle school and high school.

== Background ==
Established in 1965, the ISKL was the first school with an American curriculum in Malaysia. It was also the first fully accredited international school in Malaysia. The curriculum is US-based, and offers students the chance to earn a High School Diploma, an International Baccalaureate diploma (or certificates), and to attend Advanced Placement programs. The majority of students are from expatriate families seeking a western school system for their children while living abroad. At the same time, there are many Malaysians seeking an American-based education who also attend the school. While the school focuses on a western education system, it also maintains and encourages cultural relations with its host country, giving students the opportunity to participate in a variety of cultural activities. The school also employs the national and compulsory law of enforcing school uniforms. As of 2021, there are approximately 1500 students from more than 65 countries, with the most common nationalities being Americans, (South) Koreans, Malaysians, Chinese, and Indians. Other well-represented nationalities included are British, Canadians, Dutch, Norwegian, Japanese, Australian, Indonesian, Colombian, and Pakistani. A majority of students have parents working for oil companies or embassies, as ISKL has a close relationship with the US, and other embassies, ambassadors, and high commissioners who are regular guests at ISKL events and ceremonies.

ISKL's teaching faculty comprises individuals from the US, Canada, the UK, Australia, New Zealand, Japan, South Korea, China, Colombia, Argentina, Mexico, France, Germany, Chile, and Malaysia. Over 75% of them hold degrees at the master's or doctorate level.

ISKL is the first school to achieve Malaysia's Green Building Index Platinum rating for sustainable design.

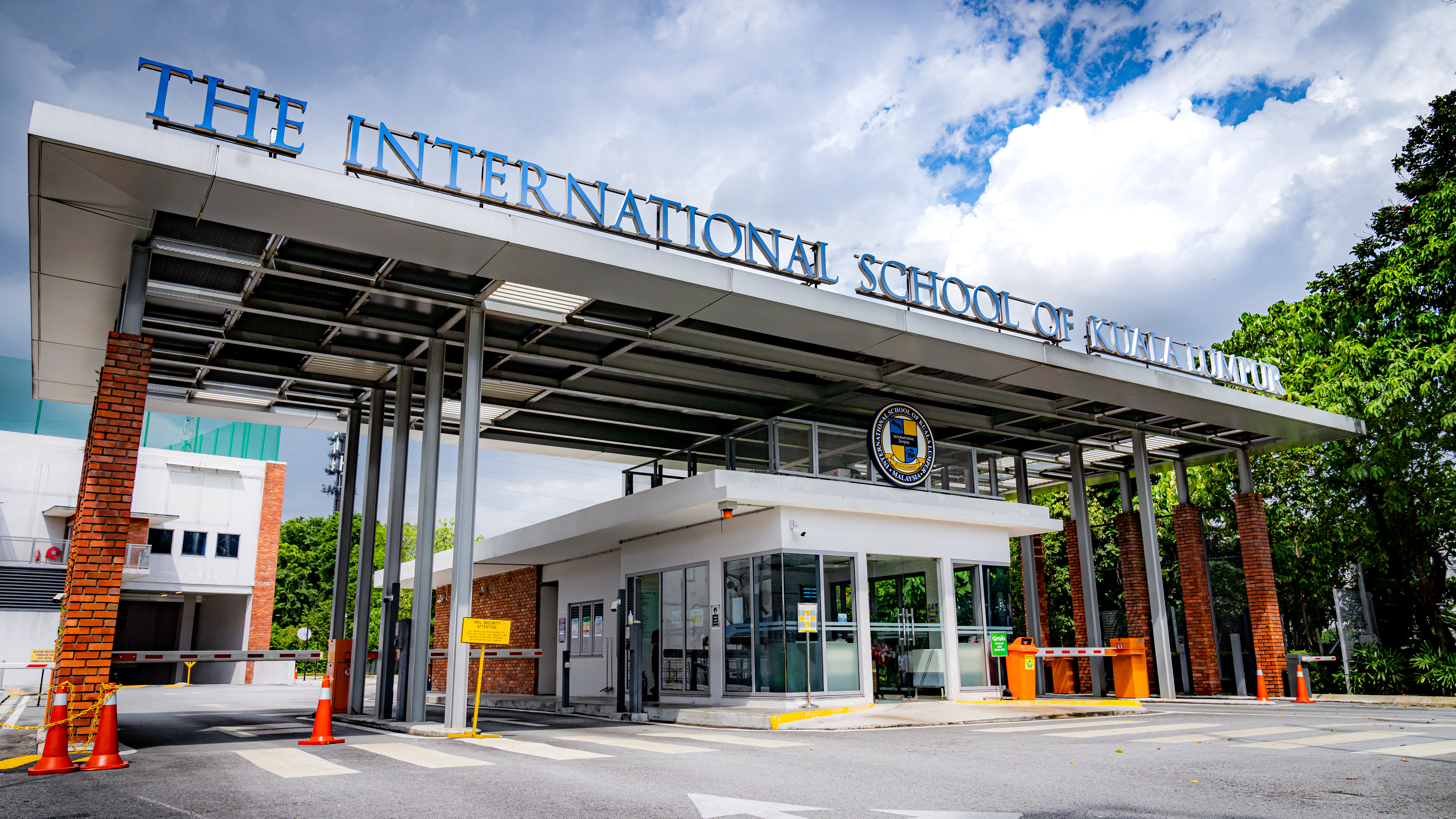
Entrance to ISKL's Ampang Hilir Campus

== History ==
ISKL was first situated in an old palace on Jalan Maxwell in the Kenny Hills area, before being granted a 2.6 ha parcel of land in Jalan Kerja Ayer Lama, Ampang Jaya in 1976. In 1992, the Melawati campus opened to accommodate the Elementary School and the Ampang campus became the home of the Middle and High School. In March 1995, the High School moved to a new wing of the Ampang campus.

ISKL moved to a 26 acres (11 ha) site on Ampang Hilir in 2018.

== Media coverage ==
As a large international school in Malaysia, ISKL is often in the news, including a May 2026 report of being invited to the Nord Anglia Education's global network of schools and a June 2019 feature of ISKL's head of school, Rami Madani.

In terms of private school fees in Malaysia, ISKL is often interviewed or referenced, in part because it is one of the country's most expensive schools.

In terms of the school's charity work, an example is its outreach to poorer children in Klang Valley.

The school is also in the news for its scholarships for Malaysian students, alumni relations, and awards. ISKL's High school principal, Jeff Farrington, was recently named the Principal of the Year for 2021. The award is sponsored by the NASSP, in affiliation with the U.S. Department of State Office of Overseas Schools.

== Governance and leadership ==
The school is parent owned and parent governed. Every year a Board of Directors is elected by all parents (members of ISKL). Parents serve on the board for two years.

The 2020–2023 Board has 14 members, all parents of ISKL students. 13 members were elected in September 2020 for a three-year term and one is the US Embassy Appointee.

The Head of School (equivalent of headmaster or CEO) is Rami Madani.

== Academics ==
ISKL's flagship high school program is the International Baccalaureate (IB) program, a two-year curriculum for 16- to 19-year-old students, culminating in exams in six subjects (three higher level and three standard level). The IB also requires students to complete three core requirements: CAS, TOK and the Extended Essay. Additionally, the Advanced Placement (AP) program is offered for students who wish to pursue colleges in the United States and Canada.

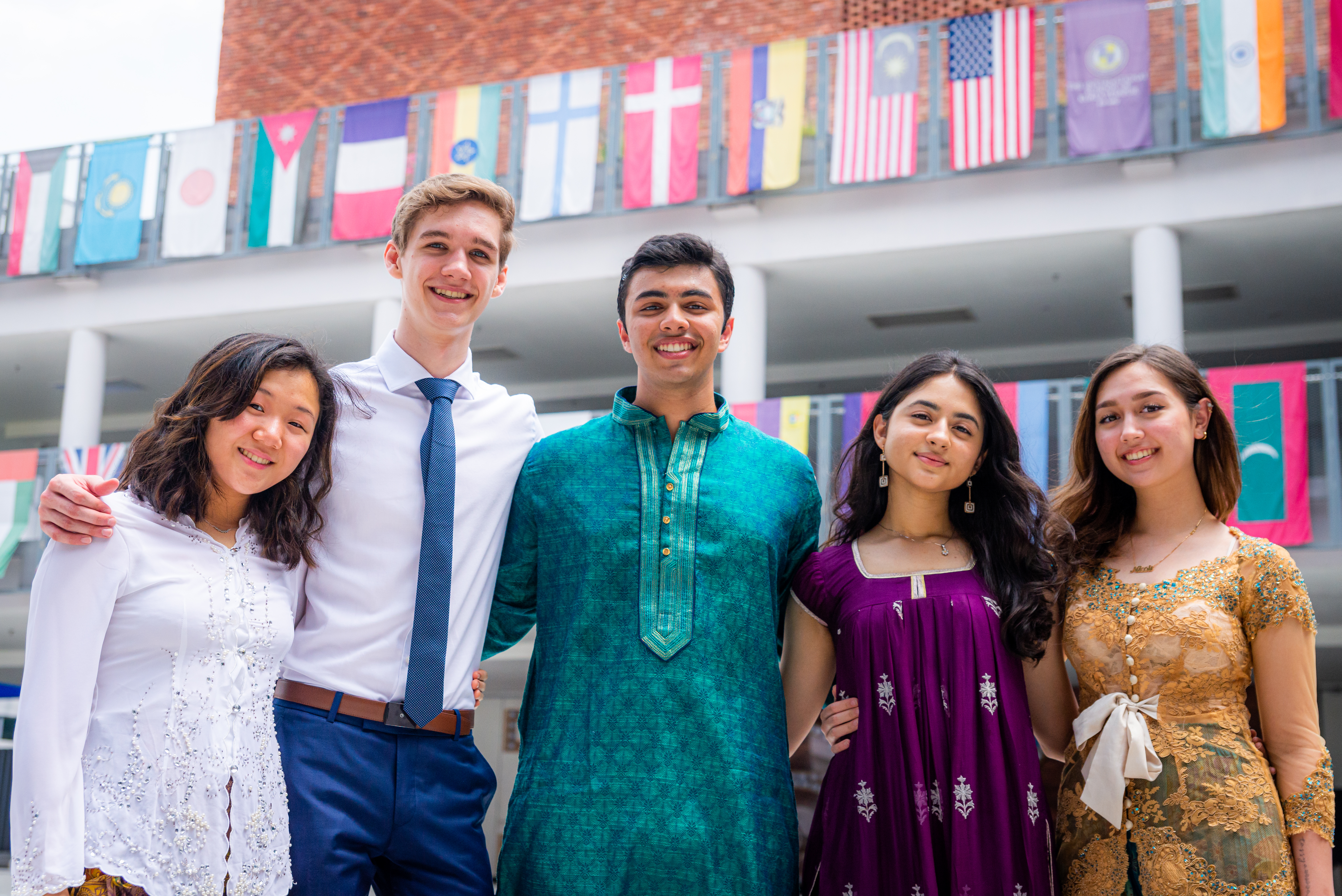
ISKL's High School Students

ISKL has a 97% pass rate for the IB Diploma, and the program is not geared towards any specific nationality. ISKL is Malaysia's longest-running IB World School. The most recent graduating class of 2021 exhibited a 98% pass rate compared to the global average of 88.96%. 10 students also scored a perfect 45 points and 36.8% scored 40 points and above. Furthermore, the average score for this class is 37.1 points, compared to the average global score of 33.02.

== Extracurricular activities and athletics ==
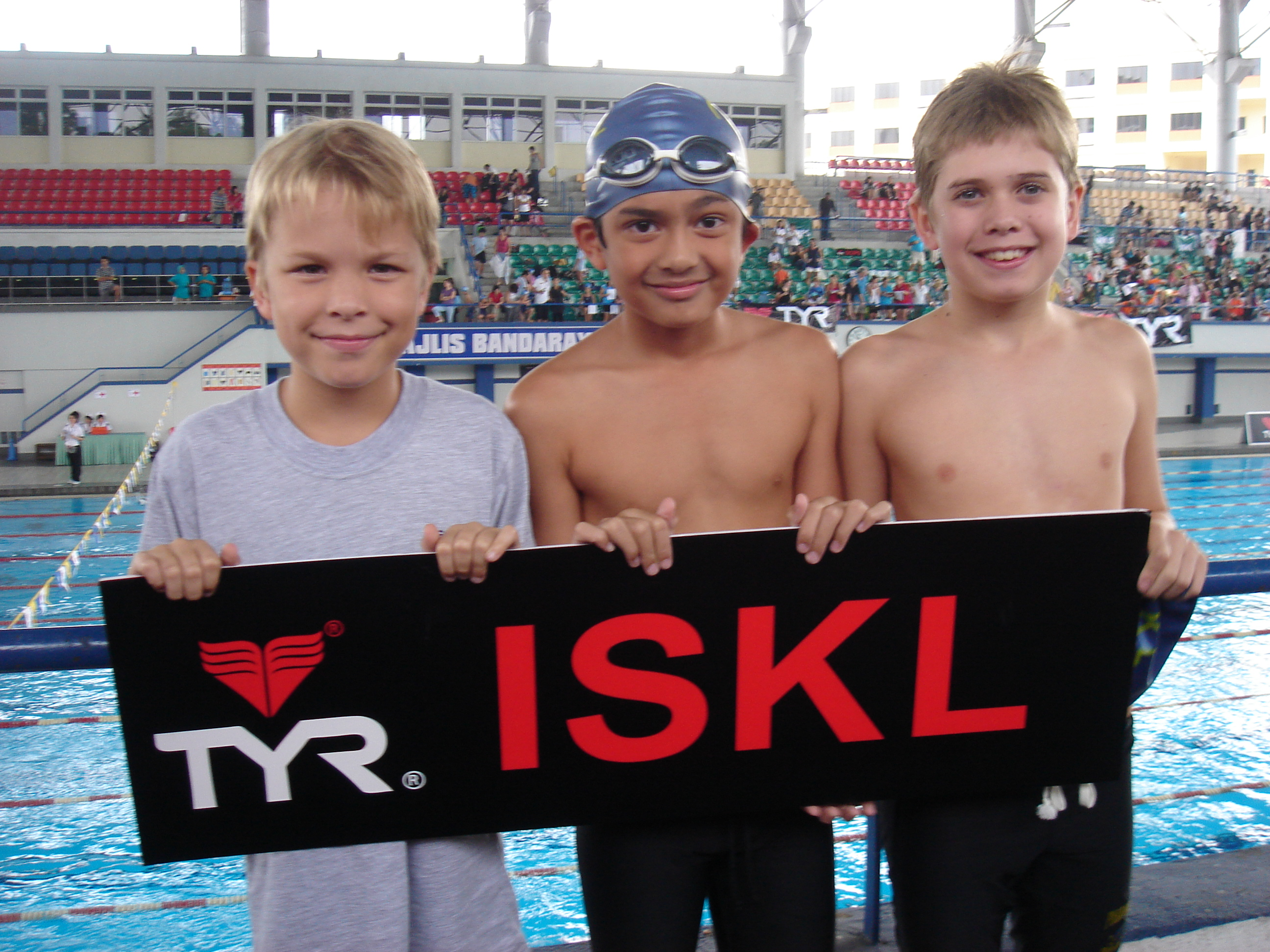
ISKL students in sports action, in this instance in the elementary school swim squad in about 2009

ISKL is a part of several international and local leagues, promoting competition between both Malaysian and international schools:

- IASAS: Formed in 1982, the Interscholastic Association of Southeast Asian Schools (IASAS) includes varsity-level competition among schools in Jakarta, Indonesia (JIS), Bangkok, Thailand (ISB), Taipei, Taiwan (TAS), Singapore (SAS) and Manila, Philippines (ISM) in sports, fine and performing arts and Model United Nations.
- ISAC: International Schools Athletic Conference
- ISAKL: International School Association of Kuala Lumpur
- SEA Forensics
- AIMS: The Association of International Malaysian Schools

Fine arts:

- Music Programs include Instrumental Music, IASAS Music, ISKL Choir, Jazz/Concert Band, the ISKL Singers (a cappella), and the Tri-M Music Society
- Dance and Theatre Programs include Dance Troupe, One Acts, Solo/Duet Acting, Improv Club, IASAS Dance, and the ISTA Theater Festival. ISKL participates in the IASAS Visual Arts competition annually

Athletics:

- The school offers a variety of sports at a multitude of levels. These sports compete at the local and international level.

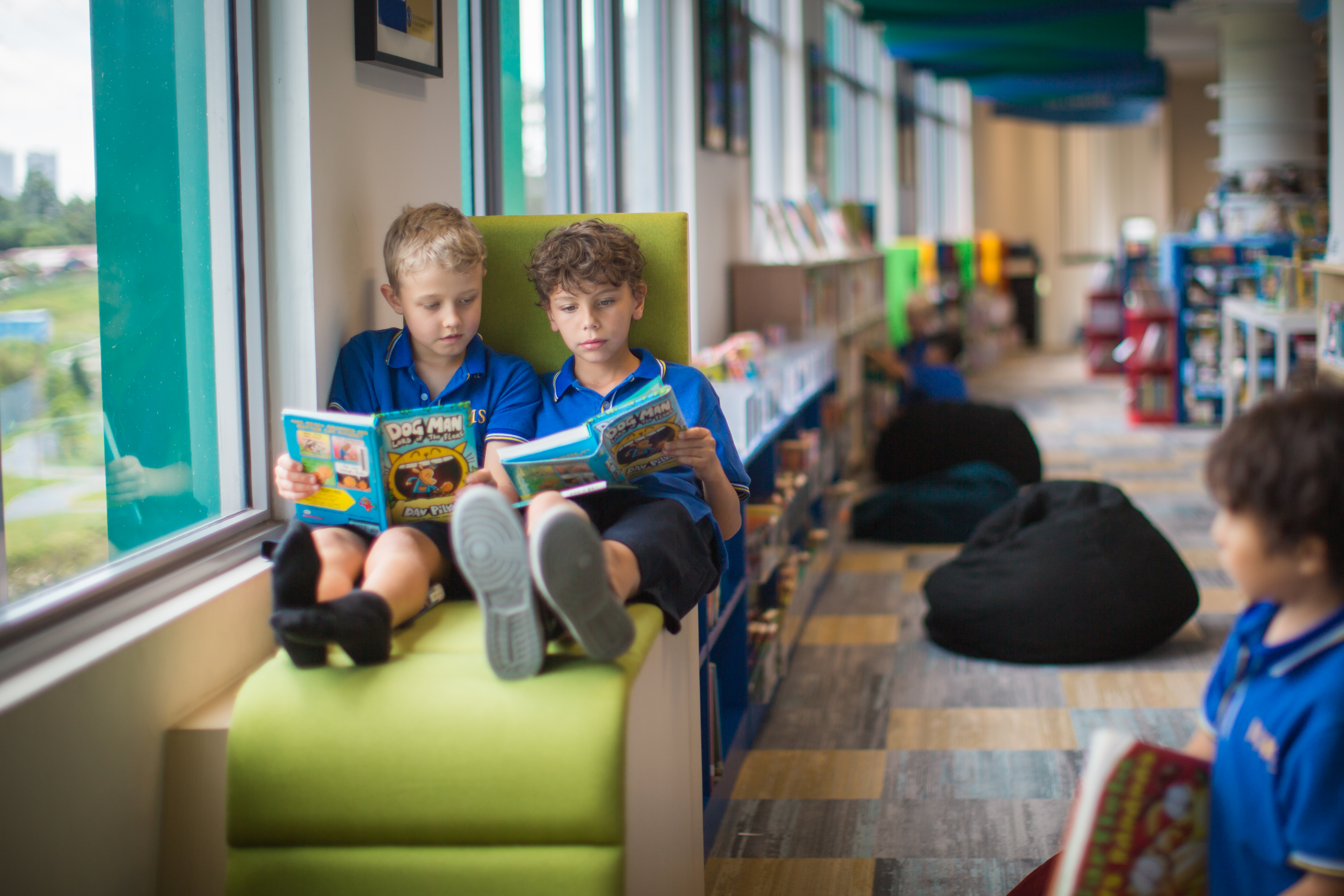
Elementary School (ES) students at the ES library

- High school varsity sports include football (soccer), cross country running, volleyball, basketball, swimming, tennis, baseball, indoor climbing, rugby, touch rugby, track & field, badminton, and golf.

== Campus facilities ==
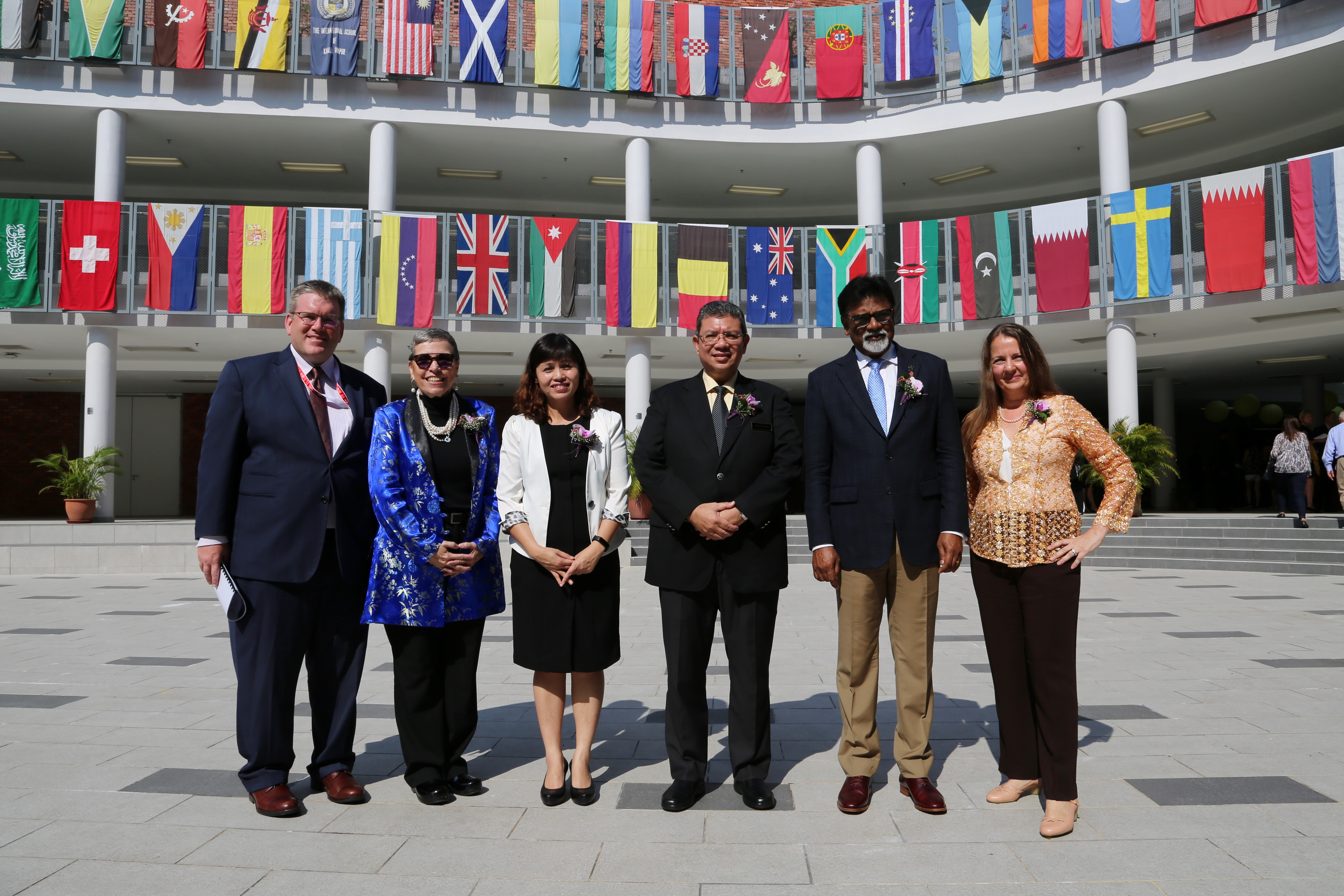
The official opening ceremony of the Ampang campus in 2019.

The Ampang campus, which began use from August 2018, is set on approximately 10 hectares (25.7 acres) in Ampang Hilir. The campus has facilities catering to both athletics and the arts. Athletic facilities include: an indoor fitness center, an Olympic-sized track; three sports fields; an Aquatic Complex including a 50-metre Olympic-sized swimming pool built accredited by FINA, two gyms, an indoor climbing wall, tennis courts and playgrounds. Arts facilities include The Dr. Norma J. Hudson Amphitheater, the Robert B. Gaw Theater and the Melawati Theater: available for student meetings, music recitals, presentations, plays and other arts-centric performances; ISKL's 'green' facility is the first International school in Malaysia to achieve platinum Green Building Index (GBI) status with environmentally sustainable concepts.

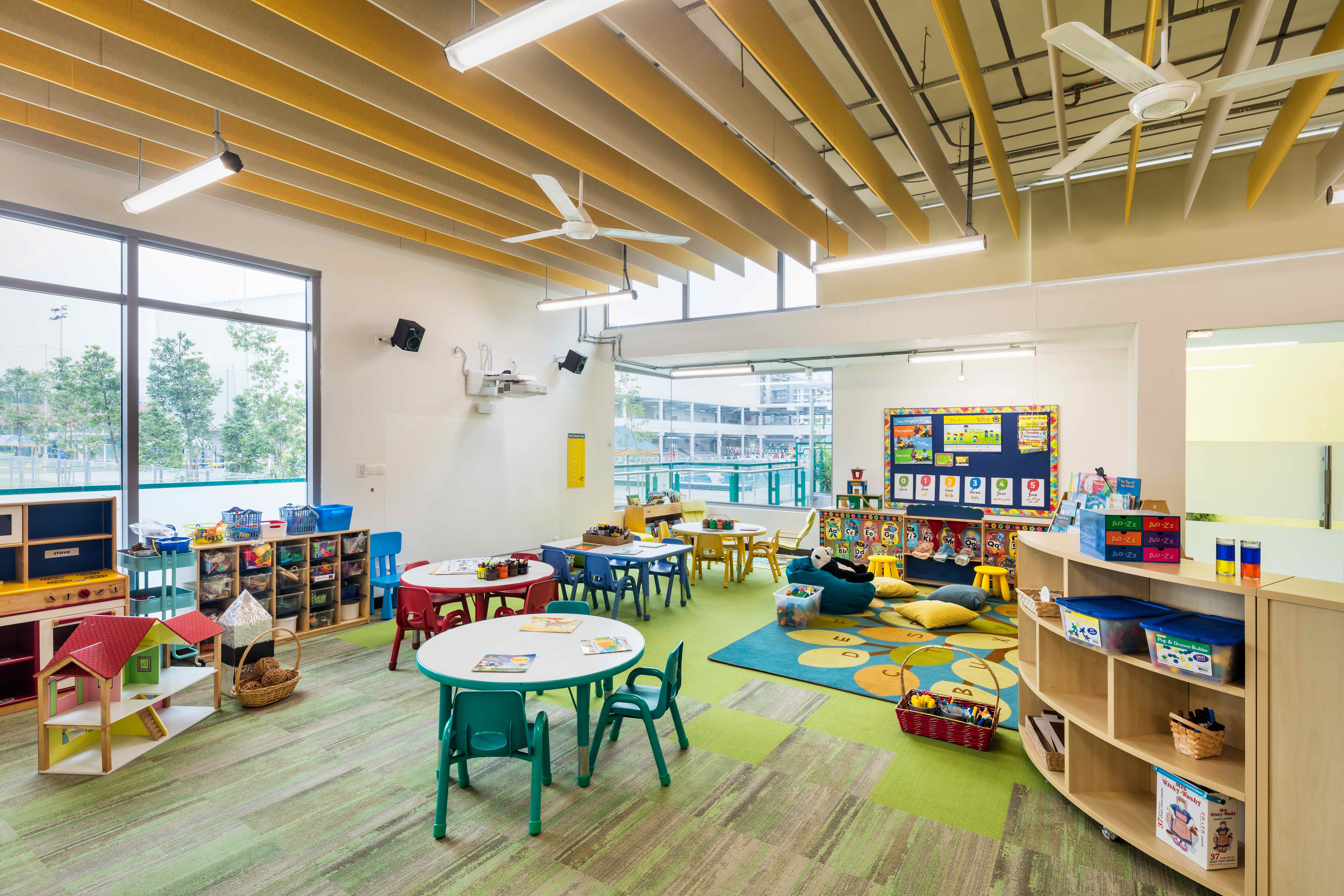
A view of a Prep Reception classroom

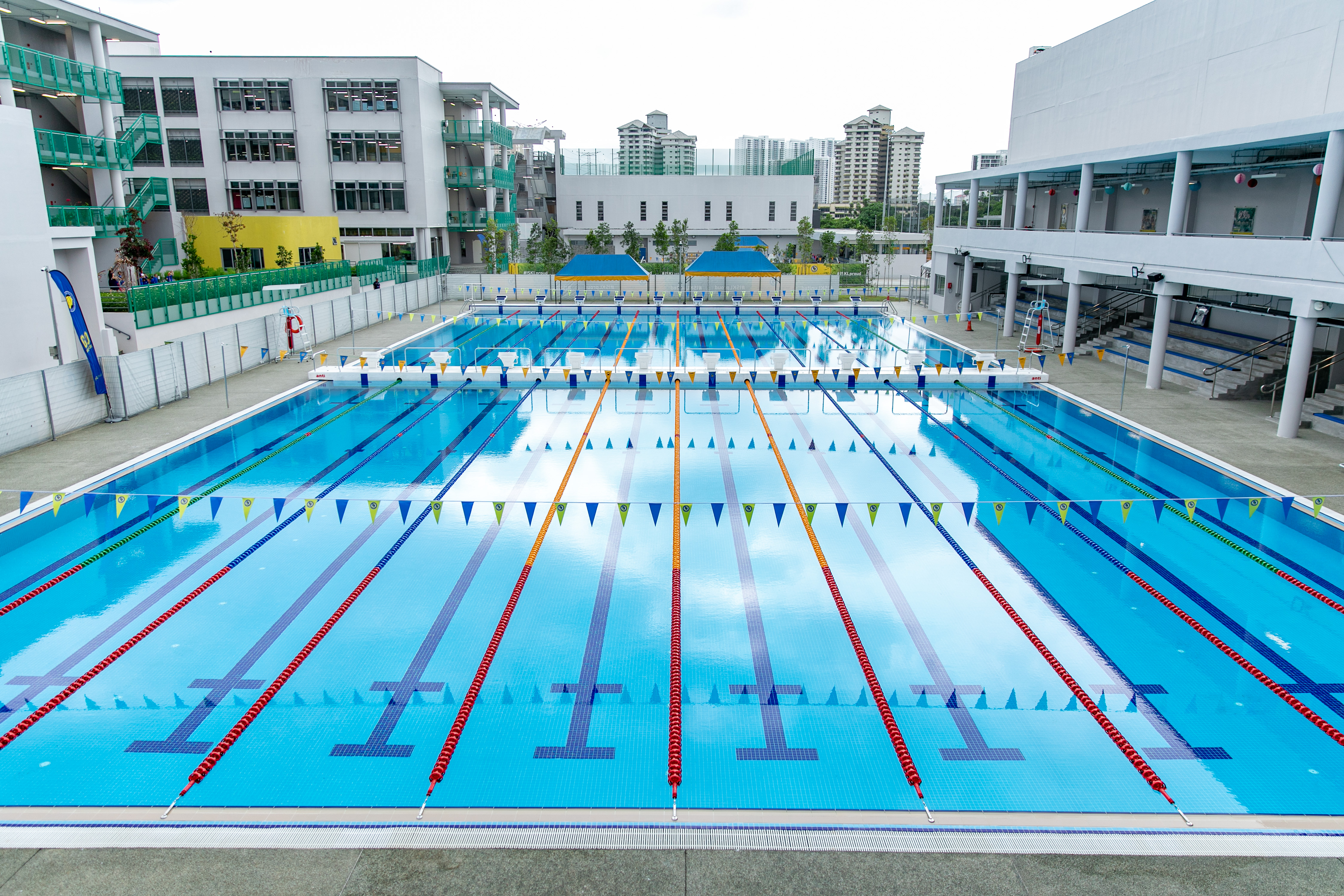
View of ISKL's Aquatic Center

== Notable alumni ==
- Nori Abdullah - Founding member of the Puteri UMNO Malaysia, chairman and board of trustees of Yayasan Budi Penyayang Malaysia (PENYAYANG)
- Sohail Inayatullah - UNESCO Chair of Futures Studies and creator of the causal layered analysis theory.
- Hamza Abdelkarim - Egypt national team football player who played in the 2026 World Cup.
- Patrick Jonsson - Film composer and music producer who assisted the development of scores in Thor, Rise of the Planet of the Apes, and Brave.
- John Caligari - Australian Lieutenant General who served as Chief Capability Development Group and commander for the United Nations Transitional Administration in East Timor (UNTAET), as part of Operation Tanager in post-independence Timor-Leste.

== See also ==
- List of schools in Kuala Lumpur
- Mont'Kiara International School
- Garden International School
