= Shahril Sufian Hamdan =

Malaysian politician

- شهريل سفيان حمدان
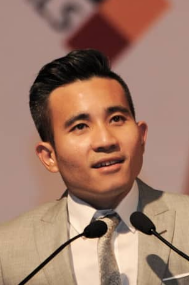
- Shahril Sufian in 2023

Information Chief of the United Malays National Organisation
- In office 12 March 2020 – 20 November 2022
- President: Ahmad Zahid Hamidi
- Preceded by: Shamsul Anuar Nasarah
- Succeeded by: Isham Jalil

Vice Youth Chief of the United Malays National Organisation
- In office 24 June 2018 – 28 January 2023
- Youth Chief: Asyraf Wajdi Dusuki
- Preceded by: Khairul Azwan Harun
- Succeeded by: Mohd Hairi Mad Shah

Economic Director at the Prime Minister's Office
- In office 12 October 2021 – 20 November 2022
- Prime Minister: Ismail Sabri Yaakob
- Preceded by: Position established
- Succeeded by: Position abolished

Personal details
- Born: Shahril Sufian bin Hamdan; 29 October 1985 (age 40) Shah Alam, Selangor, Malaysia
- Party: United Malays National Organisation (UMNO) (2006–2023) (Note: Suspended membership from UMNO on 27 January 2023.)
- Other political affiliations: Barisan Nasional (BN) (2006–2023)
- Spouse: Latisha Udani (m. 2015)
- Children: 1
- Education: University of Manchester (BSc); London School of Economics (MSc)
- Occupation: Politician; Podcaster; Management Consultant
- Website: https://www.shahrilhamdan.com/
- Shahril Sufian Hamdan on Facebook; Shahril Sufian Hamdan on X

Shahril Sufian bin Hamdan (Jawi: شهريل سفيان حمدان, Malay pronunciation: [shahril]; born 29 October 1985) is a Malaysian politician who served as the Economic Director at the Prime Minister's Office under Prime Minister Ismail Sabri Yaakob from October 2021 to November 2022. Apart from that, he was the Information Chief of UMNO and the Vice Youth Chief of the party. Shahril Sufian currently hosts a podcast called Keluar Sekejap alongside Khairy Jamaluddin, where they discuss Malaysian politics and current affairs with a variety of guests. In 2023, Shahril Sufian was named a Young Global Leader of the World Economic Forum.

== Early life and education ==
Shahril Sufian bin Hamdan was born in Shah Alam, Selangor, Malaysia to a Malay father and a Chinese mother. Shahril Sufian studied at SMK Taman Bukit Maluri and Sekolah Taman Bukit Maluri, Kepong. He graduated with a bachelor's degree in Economics and Politics from the University of Manchester under a Bank Negara Malaysia's scholarship in 2008 and completed his master's degree in Race, Ethnicity and Postcolonial Studies at the London School of Economics and Political Science, upon receiving a full Chevening Scholarship from the British Foreign and Commonwealth Office.

== Early career ==
Previously, he was a strategy and management consultant at McKinsey and Company for three years, a placement manager at Teach For Malaysia for a few months, and a policy officer to Khairy Jamaluddin for two years. Shahril Sufian also worked at Destini Oil Services as the chief executive officer of the company.

== Political career ==
=== Career in UMNO and BN ===
Shahril Sufian has held various positions in UMNO within the divisional, state, and national level. He was the Youth Chief of the Division of Kuala Langat, Youth EXCO of UMNO Malaysia during the previous 2013-2018 session, and formerly the Vice Youth Chief of UMNO during the 2018-2023 session. In 2020, he succeeded Shamsul Anuar Nasarah as the Information Chief of the Party. Shahril Sufian was eventually suspended for 6 years from UMNO alongside other national party leaders such as Annuar Musa, Noh Omar and Khairy Jamaluddin.

=== Parliamentary candidacy ===
Shahril Sufian first contested in the 14th Malaysian general election, where he was fielded for the Kuala Langat federal constituency under the BN ticket, but eventually lost to a 3 cornered race with former Pakatan Harapan MP Xavier Jayakumar. Shahril Sufian was hinted again to contest for parliament in the 15th Malaysian general election, and he was fielded at Alor Gajah in Malacca but again fell short losing to former Chief Minister of Malacca, Adly Zahari by a slim majority of 890 votes.

== Personal life ==
Shahril Sufian is married to Latisha Udani and have one child.

== Election results ==
Parliament of Malaysia
Year	Constituency	Candidate	Votes	Pct	Opponent(s)	Votes	Pct	Ballots cast	Majority	Turnout
2018	P112 Kuala Langat	Shahril Sufian Hamdan (UMNO)	26,127	29.66%	Xavier Jayakumar Arulanandam (PKR)	43,239	49.08%	89,437	17,112	87.34%
2018	P112 Kuala Langat	Shahril Sufian Hamdan (UMNO)	26,127	29.66%	Yahya Baba (PAS)	18,731	21.26%	89,437	17,112	87.34%
2022	P135 Alor Gajah	Shahril Sufian Hamdan (UMNO)	27,288	37.38%	Adly Zahari (AMANAH)	28,178	38.60%	73,000	890	78.23%
2022	P135 Alor Gajah	Shahril Sufian Hamdan (UMNO)	27,288	37.38%	Mohd Redzuan Md Yusof (BERSATU)	17,211	23.58%	73,000	890	78.23%
2022	P135 Alor Gajah	Shahril Sufian Hamdan (UMNO)	27,288	37.38%	Muhammad Nazriq Abdul Rahman (PEJUANG)	323	0.44%	73,000	890	78.23%

== Filmography ==
=== Podcast ===
Year	Title	Role	Notes
2023–present	Keluar Sekejap	Host	with Khairy Jamaluddin
