= Keluar Sekejap =

Malaysian podcast

- Genre: Political commentary; news
- Format: Audio; video
- Language: Malay
- Version also in: English

Cast and voices
- Hosted by: Khairy Jamaluddin; Shahril Hamdan; Ong Kian Ming; Zaidel Baharuddin

Production
- Production: Ismail Amsyar; Raja Syahrir; Syahir Zaini; Iman Irfan; Madi Azmadi; Isa Yusof; Nor Hisham @ Bro Jinggo
- Length: 1-2+ hours

Technical specifications
- Video format: YouTube; Spotify
- Audio format: MP3

Publication
- No. of episodes: 200 (as of May 26, 2026)
- Original release: March 1, 2023
- Provider: Keluar Sekejap (2023–present)

Related
- Website: Keluar Sekejap

YouTube information
- Channel: Keluar Sekejap
- Years active: 2023–present
- Subscribers: 425 thousand
- Views: 75.7 million
- Last updated: May 26, 2026

Keluar Sekejap (alternatively referred by its initials KS) is a weekly Malaysian political podcast primarily hosted by two Malaysian politicians Khairy Jamaluddin and Shahril Hamdan. It launched its pilot episode on March 1, 2023, and officially its first episode on March 7, 2023, on YouTube and Spotify. Keluar Sekejap has consistently been ranked as one of Malaysia's most popular podcasts and has influenced the trend of political podcasting in the country and the Southeast Asian region. The podcast has been available on various platforms such as YouTube, Spotify, and Apple Podcasts with highlights uploaded onto their main Instagram, Facebook, TikTok and Twitter page.

== Background ==
Keluar Sekejap initially started due to KJ and Shahril's dismissal from the United Malays National Organisation (UMNO) and was inspired from the British podcast The Rest is Politics hosted by Alastair Campbell and Rory Stewart, who were also both expelled from their parties. KJ and Shahril's expulsion started due to their open criticism towards the sitting president Ahmad Zahid Hamidi. KJ, who was the former UMNO Youth Chief wanted to compete for the presidential post for the 2023 United Malays National Organisation leadership election, but then was denied and sacked before the party election took place allegedely due to sabotaging the party during GE-15. Shahril was also dismissed for 6 years but was not entirely sacked from the party.

The podcast regularly receives six figure views per episode whilst including various notable local politicians such as former Malaysian Prime Ministers Mahathir Mohamad and Ismail Sabri Yaakob, and international leaders including Leader of the Opposition of Singapore Pritam Singh and the former Governor of Jakarta Anies Baswedan.

=== Khairy Jamaluddin ===
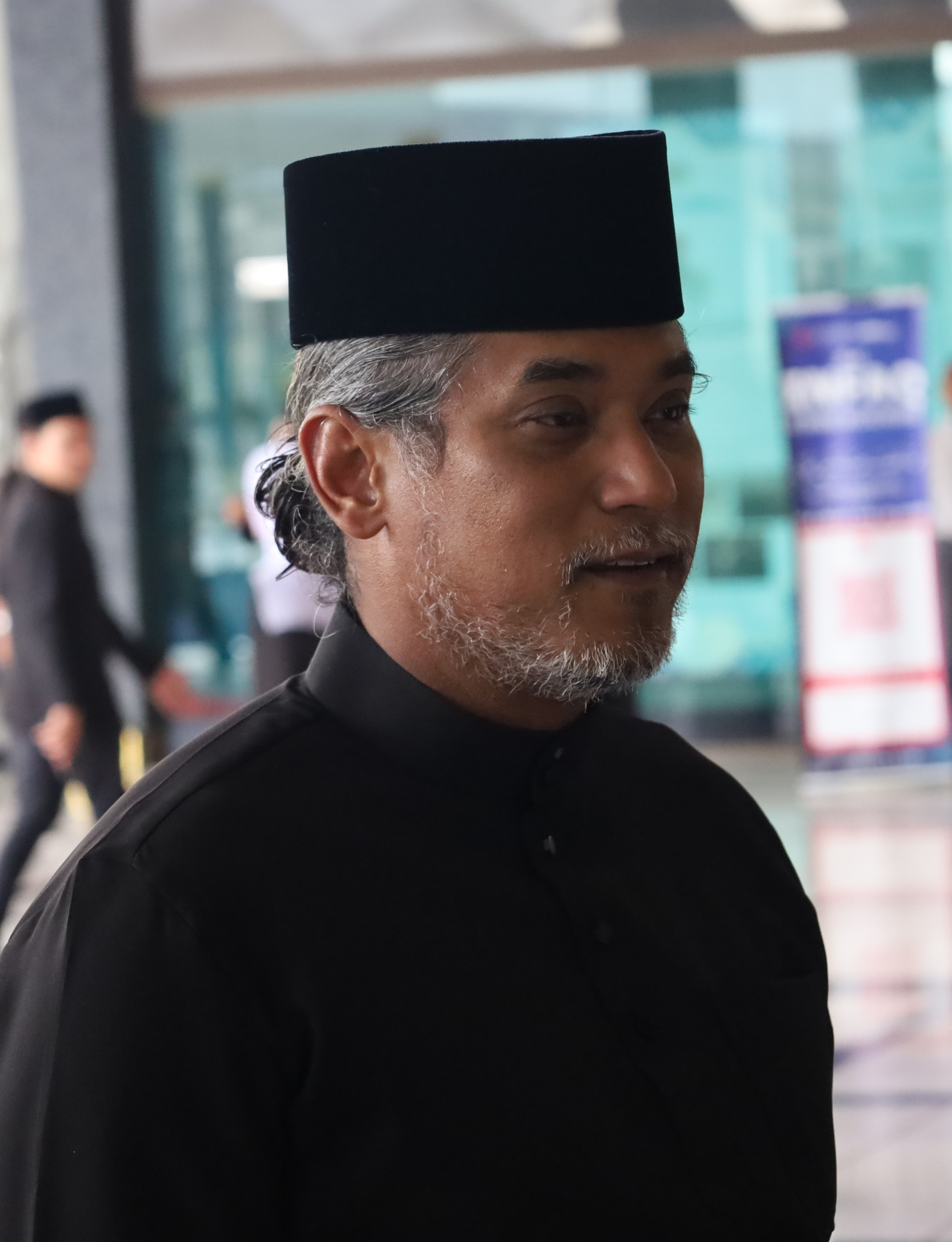
Khairy Jamaluddin

Khairy Jamaluddin Abu Bakar or more commonly known as KJ is one of two co-founders and regular co-hosts of Keluar Sekejap. An Oxford graduate in philosophy, politics and economics who had a stint in journaling for The Economist, KJ acts as the main host of the podcast, notably as the main persona of the show where he often exerts his main views on Malaysian politics, government policies, economics, and current affairs. Prior in creating the podcast, KJ was the former Malaysian Minister of Health and the Member of Parliament for Rembau where he was in charge of spearheading the country out of the COVID-19 pandemic. KJ's dismissal from Malaysia's Grand Old Party was one of the core reasons on creating Keluar Sekejap where he stated that he wanted to stay politically relevant despite being sacked by the party.

=== Shahril Hamdan ===
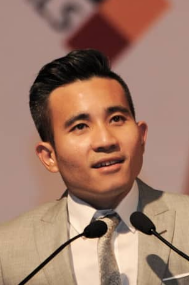
Shahril Sufian Hamdan

Shahril Sufian Hamdan, co-founder and co-host, who is also an UMNO exile was the former economic advisor to the 9th Prime Minister of Malaysia, Ismail Sabri Yaakob. Shahril studied economics at Manchester, and sociology at the London School of Economics where he was a Chevening Scholar. He has held various high positions in UMNO where he was the former Vice Youth Chief and Information Chief of the party. Shahril's rise in politics was attributed to his close connection with KJ, where they share similar views and ideology within the party. Before the 2023 United Malays National Organisation leadership election, Shahril's membership as an UMNO member was terminated for 6 years which correlated to his ambition in creating Keluar Sekejap with KJ.

== Content ==
Since its release, the podcast has known to criticize both the Malaysian government led by Anwar Ibrahim and the opposition coalition Perikatan Nasional (PN) on various issues and views. Both KJ and Shahril share centrist and moderate ideals for Malaysia, where they often reject ultraconservative sentiments from the opposition and populist agendas by the government.

=== PH-BN government ===
KJ and Shahril has shared mixed views toward the Anwar Ibrahim cabinet, rarely praising them for their policies involving the economy, foreign policy and governance, but oftentimes criticizing them for their lack of commitment in political reform involving combating corruption. KJ acknowledges the challenges of the current PH-BN government to enforce structural reforms, but believes that the government has not done enough critical or substantial effort.

The podcast often criticizes and condemns the current state of UMNO which is led by its president, Ahmad Zahid Hamidi. Both KJ and Shahril is known to share contradictory opinions with Zahid, where KJ had competed against and lost to Zahid for the presidential post back in the 2018 United Malays National Organisation leadership election.

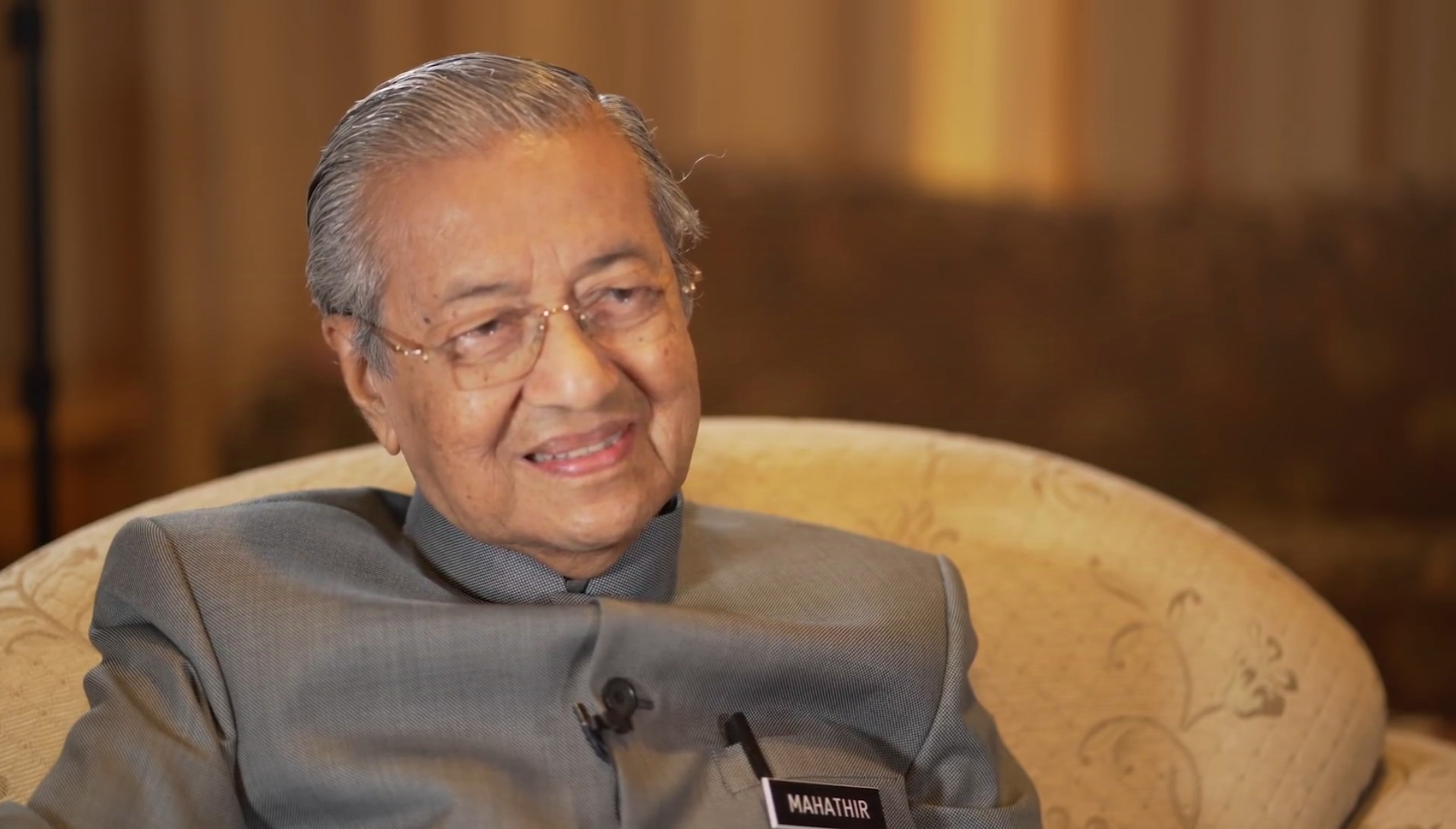
Keluar Sekejap's most famous guest Mahathir Mohamad

=== Perikatan Nasional ===
In the podcast, both KJ and Shahril had shown more support towards the opposition compared to the PH-BN government. During the 2023 Malaysian state elections, KJ had declared his support towards several PN candidates, where he even went to campaign and assist several of them during election season whilst Shahril remain apolitical. Despite the support, KJ and Shahril had both criticized PN's political rhetoric on abusing racial and religious sentiments in attracting rural and conservative Malay voters. In an episode with the Member of Parliament for Machang Wan Ahmad Fayhsal Wan Ahmad Kamal, KJ and Shahril had expressed their disapproval towards Wan Fayhsal's racial comments towards the Democratic Action Party (DAP).

== Other ventures ==
Since its launch in March 2023, Keluar Sekejap has rapidly evolved from a standalone political podcast into a diversified media brand under KS Media. Aside the main weekly episodes hosted by Khairy Jamaluddin and Shahril Hamdan, the founders have expanded into the following ventures and products. KS Lagi, a digital media platform, is launched in mid-2024 in partnership with Catcha Digital. It is a digital media business that moves beyond politics into lifestyle and general interest categories. It features a broader range of content. Moreover the ksmedia.my portal serves as a central hub for their various media arms, including sponsorship and collaboration inquiries.

=== Sembang Kuali ===
A lifestyle and cooking-themed show (e.g., featuring segments with guests like Dr. Athina and Vegan Chef Dave). Articles and videos focusing on health, wellness, technology, fashion, and arts, curated for a contemporary audience.

=== Kelas Sekejap ===
One of their most significant technical ventures is the Kelas Sekejap app, an AI-powered English-learning application designed specifically for Malaysians to improve their speaking confidence. It uses a "learn-by-talking" approach with real-time feedback.

== Sister podcasts ==
Since its breakout success, Keluar Sekejap (KS) has expanded into a multi-show media network under the KS Media umbrella. They have launched several sister podcasts and spin-off series, many of which are hosted on their secondary YouTube channel, Keluar Sekejap Lagi. This include Kindred Stories, Sembang KS hosted by Zaidel Baharuddin, Sejarah Kita, as well as Kena Soal.

== Special guests ==
KS often hosts special guests, typically Malaysian politicians from across all lines who are within the current political scene. The following guests have been interviewed on the podcasts' special episodes:

=== 2023 ===
No.	Guest(s)	Running time	Original release date	Link
15	Ong Kian Ming: Part 1	1:42:48	May 2, 2023	link at Youtube
Former Deputy Minister of International Trade and Industry and former Member of Parliament for Bangi, Dr. Ong Kian Ming discusses the future and issues of the Democratic Action Party (DAP) and his political ambitions post GE-15.
24	Wan Ahmad Fayhsal Wan Ahmad Kamal	1:36:23	June 1, 2023	link at Youtube
The Shadow Foreign Minister of Malaysia and Member of Parliament for Machang, Wan Fayhsal discusses all about Perikatan Nasional, his decision on associating with the Malaysian Islamic Party (PAS), and comments on the current Anwar Government.
34	Muhammad Sanusi Md Nor	1:32:07	July 11, 2023	link at Youtube
The controversial and ever notorious 14th Menteri Besar of Kedah, Dato' Seri Muhammad Sanusi Md Nor discusses PAS's political agenda on mixing religion and politics, PAS and PPBM relations, as well as views on Muafakat Nasional between UMNO and PAS.
37	Syed Saddiq Syed Abdul Rahman and Amira Aisya Abdul Aziz	1:45:22	July 23, 2023	link at Youtube
Malaysian United Democratic Alliance's (MUDA) top two leaders which are Member of Parliament for Muar Syed Saddiq and Member of the Johor State Legislative Assembly for Puteri Wangsa Amira Aisya Abdul Aziz discusses MUDA's future and relevance and the 2023 Good Vibes Festival issue.
38	Nik Nazmi Nik Ahmad	1:45:19	July 25, 2023	link at Youtube
The Minister of Natural Resources, Environment and Climate Change of Malaysia and Member of Parliament for Setiawangsa, Nik Nazmi Nik Ahmad discusses challenges facing the ministry, Malaysia's vision on industrial energy, energy opportunities in Selangor and the Malaysian East Coast, and relations between Rafizi Ramli and Anwar Ibrahim.
40	Amirudin Shari	1:32:51	August 8, 2023	link at Youtube
16th Menteri Besar of Selangor and Vice President of the People's Justice Party (PKR), Dato' Seri Amirudin Shari discusses his role in developing Selangor, comments on Sanusi Md Nor and PKR's "Kartel" faction, as well as views on the 2023 Malaysian state elections.
41	Azmin Ali	1:54:45	August 8, 2023	link at Youtube
Former Senior Minister of Malaysia and former PKR Deputy President, Dato' Seri Azmin Ali discusses his views on Mahathir Mohamad and Anwar, PN's Menteri Besar candidate for Selangor, and the Sheraton Move.
42	Ong Kian Ming: Part 2	2:01:09	August 14, 2023	link at Youtube
Former Deputy Minister of International Trade and Industry and former Member of Parliament for Bangi, Dr. Ong Kian Ming discusses the outcomes of the 2023 Malaysian state elections.
50	Wan Junaidi Tuanku Jaafar	1:42:05	September 16, 2023	link at Youtube
19th President of the Dewan Negara and veteran Sarawakian politician, Tan Sri Wan Junaidi Tuanku Jaafar discusses Malaysia Day and the Malaysia Agreement (MA63) on Malaysian Day.
58	Muslim Imran	1:39:53	October 16, 2023	link at Youtube
Founding Director of the Asia Middle East Center for Research & Dialogue (AMEC) who is also a member of the Hamas International Bureau in Asia, Dr. Muslim Imran discusses the current Gaza war, the geopolitical history of the Israel-Palestinian conflict and the international reaction towards the war.
61	Tunku Ismail Idris	1:34:32	October 29, 2023	link at Youtube
The Crown Prince of Johor, His Royal Highness Major General Tunku Ismail Idris discusses various matters such as the declaration of the Sultan of Johor, Sultan Ibrahim Sultan Iskandar as the 17th Yang di-Pertuan Agong, the relevance of royal institutions, the Johor nation in the context of Malaysia, the future of Johor Darul Ta'zim F.C. (JDT), and the current state of national politics.
65	Mahathir Mohamad	2:20:36	November 13, 2023	link at Youtube
4th and 7th Prime Minister of Malaysia, Mahathir Mohamad discusses issues such as the clash between Tun M and KJ in the past, the Malay & Malaysian dilemma, Tun M's views on Anwar Ibrahim, as well as Tun M's issues with former Prime Ministers of Malaysia notably Najib Razak and Abdullah Ahmad Badawi.
67	Ong Kian Ming: Part 3	1:12:44	November 20, 2023	link at Youtube
Former Deputy Minister of International Trade and Industry and former Member of Parliament for Bangi, Dr. Ong Kian Ming discusses about Malaysia's achievements in APEC United States 2023, the need for a cabinet reshuffle by the Prime Minister, and the Generational Endgame (GEG) policy.
68	Apurva Sanghi	1:33:14	November 23, 2023	link at Youtube
World Bank Lead Economist for Malaysia, Apurva Sanghi discusses the background, functions and position of the World Bank, and his views on the National Economic Performance and the Malaysia Madani Economic Framework brought by the PMX-led government.
70	Mohamed Shafee Abdullah	1:41:04	December 3, 2023	link at Youtube
Prominent lawyer, former Commissioner of the Human Rights Commission of Malaysia (SUHAKAM) and Najib Razak's leading defense attorney, Tan Sri Mohamed Shafee Abdullah discusses the Altantuya Murder Case and the pardoning process of Najib Razak.
71	Zulkifli Mohamad Al-Bakri	2:05:21	December 6, 2023	link at Youtube
Former Minister in the Prime Minister's Department in charge of Religious Affairs and 7th Mufti of Federal Territories, Dato' Seri Dr. Ustaz Zulkifli Mohamad al-Bakri discusses his journey from Mufti to Minister, Islamic politics as a whole and the pluralism of Malaysian society.
74	Mahfud MD	1:18:17	December 19, 2023	link at Youtube
14th Coordinating Minister for Political, Legal, and Security Affairs, 2nd Chief Justice of the Constitutional Court of Indonesia and Vice President candidate for the 2024 Indonesian presidential election, Prof Dr. Mohammad Mahfud Mahmodin discusses his vice presidential campaign as Ganjar Pranowo's running mate as well as his vision for Indonesia.

=== 2024 ===
No.	Guest(s)	Running time	Original release date	Link
79	Rafidah Aziz	1:16:08	January 23, 2024	link at Youtube
1st Minister of International Trade and Industry, 'Malaysia's Iron Lady' Tan Sri Rafidah Aziz discusses about Ketuanan Melayu, her 'world view' as well as her experience as the longest serving MITI Minister.
89	Ahmad Samsuri Mokhtar	1:39:51	March 13, 2024	link at Youtube
15th Menteri Besar of Terengganu, Dato' Seri Dr. Ahmad Samsuri Mokhtar traced his life journey, touched on the future of PAS and Perikatan Nasional towards GE16 and the direction of the Terengganu state government, as well as his comments on the performance of the Madani government.
91	Saifuddin Nasution Ismail	2:08:01	March 25, 2024	link at Youtube
Minister of Home Affairs, Senator Datuk Seri Saifuddin Nasution Ismail talked about his early political career, his experience with Anwar in 1998, Anwar-Mahathir cooperation in GE14, Constitutional amendment on Malaysian nationality law, Sedition Act & SOSMA Act, Reformasi and the future of People's Justice Party.
93	Anthony Loke	2:09:43	April 5, 2024	link at Youtube
Minister of Transport, Anthony Loke discusses his early political career, commented on the challenges at the Ministry of Transport as well as the transformation of transport in Malaysia. Loke also touched on DAP's ideology, the PH-BN relationship, having a PM from DAP, as well as the influence of the Lim Dynasty in DAP.
96	Yuko Nakajima and Paul McPhun	1:09:27	April 19, 2024	link at Youtube
Medical practitioners from Doctors Without Borders or Médecins Sans Frontières (MSF), Dr. Yuko Nakajima and Paul McPhun discusses the MSF medical aid mission in Palestine that has started since 1989, in addition to the two guests sharing their experiences and the real picture of the current situation in the Gaza Strip following Israel's latest genocide against the Palestinian population that has been going on for more than 6 months.
98	Mas Ermieyati Samsudin	1:46:56	April 25, 2024	link at Youtube
Member of Parliament for Masjid Tanah and the Chairman of the Public Accounts Committee (PAC), Datuk Wira Mas Ermieyati Samsudin discusses the role of the PAC in the Dewan Rakyat as well as the latest developments in the TLDM Second Generation Patrol Ship Development Project (LCS).
101	Wee Ka Siong	2:07:58	May 7, 2024	link at Youtube
11th President of the Malaysian Chinese Association (MCA) and Member of Parliament for Ayer Hitam, Datuk Seri Dr. Ir. Wee Ka Siong questions the allegation that MCA is a tauke party and the allegation that MCA boycotted the 2024 Kuala Kubu Baharu by-election. Wee also commented on the direction of MCA if UMNO and Zahid Hamidi decides to join PH in GE-16 as well as the probability that MCA will become DAP 2.0 with a new image.
102	Siti Hamisah Tapsir	1:57:37	May 9, 2024	link at Youtube
Vice-Chancellor of UCSI University and Independent Non-Executive Director of Sime Darby, Prof Datuk Dr. Ir. Ts. Siti Hamisah Tapsir discusses about higher education issues in Malaysia, cultivation, awareness and importance of science as well as the characteristics of an ideal graduate.
113	Ong Kian Ming: Part 4	2:01:22	July 9, 2024	link at Youtube
Former Deputy Minister of International Trade and Industry and former Member of Parliament for Bangi, Dr. Ong Kian Ming discusses the result of the 2024 Sungai Bakap by-election, the affidavit for the house arrest of Dato' Sri Najib, the Auditor General's Report, and the recent 2024 UK general election.
115	Abang Abdul Rahman Johari	1:58:24	July 22, 2024	link at Youtube
1st Premier of Sarawak, Datuk Pattinggi Tan Sri Abang Johari Abang Openg discusses on Sarawak's position in Malaysia as well as the latest developments in the demands of the Malaysia Agreement 1963 (MA63).
120	Ismail Sabri Yaakob	2:03:47	August 28, 2024	link at Youtube
9th Prime Minister of Malaysia, Dato' Sri Ismail Sabri Yaakob discusses his experiences and achievements during his tenure as Prime Minister during a critical period when the country was facing a health, economic and political crisis.
123	Shafie Apdal	2:19:15	September 16, 2024	link at Youtube
15th Chief Minister of Sabah, Datuk Seri Panglima Mohd Shafie Apdal discusses the position of Sabah in Malaysia as well as the development of matters contained in the Malaysia Agreement 1963 (MA63).
126	Mohd Asri Zainul Abidin	1:52:05	October 8, 2024	link at Youtube
Current Mufti of Perlis, Sahibus Samahah Prof. Dato' Arif Perkasa Dr. Mohd Asri Zainul Abidin discusses the Global Ikhwan child abuse scandal, the Al-Arqam movement, the concept of Wala' within the Malaysian-Malay community and the Malaysian Islamic Party (PAS), as well as Islamic jurisprudence and Perlis exceptionalism on making a fatwa.
131	Hassan Abdul Karim	1:54:38	November 12, 2024	link at Youtube
Member of Parliament for Pasir Gudang and 5th and Former President of Parti Rakyat Malaysia, Hassan Abdul Karim discusses his journey and struggle of left-wing politics as well as his open criticisms through writing.
Special	Anies Baswedan	1:29:08	December 30, 2024	link at Youtube
14th Governor of Jakarta and former Presidential candidate for the 2024 Indonesian presidential election, Anies Baswedan discusses his views and vision for Indonesia's future.

=== 2025 ===
No.	Guest(s)	Running time	Original release date	Link
146	Kuljit Singh and Anwar Anis	1:35:47	March 7, 2025	link at Youtube
President and Honorary Secretary of the Association of Private Hospitals of Malaysia (APHM) Datuk Dr. Kuljit Singh and Mr. Anwar Anis discusses in depth about the inflation of medical costs in private hospitals and its impact on the country's health system.
148	Azman Abidin	1:48:32	March 18, 2024	link at Youtube
Political Secretary to the 10th Prime Minister of Malaysia, Datuk Azman Abidin discusses about The Urban Renewal Act (URA) and the upcoming 2025 People's Justice Party leadership election.
149	Hamzah Zainuddin	1:48:32	March 21, 2024	link at Youtube
17th Leader of the Opposition and Deputy President of the Malaysian United Indigenous Party (BERSATU), Dato' Seri Hamzah Zainuddin discussed his political journey from being a 'political operator' to becoming Malaysia's Leader of the Opposition.
151	Nik Nazmi Nik Ahmad: Part 2	1:46:37	April 14, 2025	link at Youtube
The Minister of Natural Resources and Environmental Sustainability of Malaysia and Member of Parliament for Setiawangsa, Nik Nazmi Nik Ahmad discussed various major issues from climate change to changes within the People's Justice Party (PKR) particularly for the upcoming 2025 party elections.
152	Mohd Annuar Zaini, Kalimullah Masheerul Hassan, and Thajudeen Abdul Wahab	2:47:07	April 23, 2025	link at Youtube
A special episode to commemorate the late Tun Abdullah Ahmad Badawi (Pak Lah), the 5th Prime Minister of Malaysia with Pak Lah's closest aides and confidants such as the former Chairman of BERNAMA, Tan Sri Mohd Annuar Zaini, former Chairman of ECM Libra, Datuk Seri Kalimullah Hassan, and the former Chief Private Secretary to Pak Lah, Datuk Thajudeen Abdul Wahab.
160	Pritam Singh	1:49:23	June 24, 2025	link at Youtube
9th Leader of the Opposition of Singapore and Secretary General of the Singaporean Workers' Party (WP), Pritam Singh discussed his educational background, early career, to his decision to join the tightly controlled world of politics under the rule of the People's Action Party (PAP).
161	Amir Hamzah Azizan	1:46:26	July 2, 2025	link at Youtube
Minister of Finance II and Acting Minister of Economy, Senator Datuk Seri Amir Hamzah Azizan dives into an in-depth discussion on the direction of the country's fiscal policy, targeting of RON95 subsidies, SST expansion, and the implementation of the MADANI Economic Framework.
162	Haniff Khatri	1:48:02	July 9, 2025	link at Youtube
Seasoned lawyer and former Chairman of Penang Regional Development Authority (PERDA), Haniff Khatri focused on the issue of the judicial system's turmoil, examining the vacancy of the Chief Justice of Malaysia, and the question of transparency and independence of the judiciary from executive influence.
173	Zainal Rashid Ahmad	1:51:44	October 14, 2025	link at Youtube
Veteran journalist and writer Haji Zainal Rashid Ahmad or ZRA discussed his experiences in Palestine in 2005, 2008 and most recently after joining the Global Sumud Flotilla (GSF) — an international humanitarian mission bringing aid to Gaza by sea.
175	Wan Saiful Wan Jan and Wan Ahmad Fayhsal Wan Ahmad Kamal	2:01:57	November 4, 2025	link at Youtube
Exiled Supreme Council Members of the Malaysian United Indigenous Party (BERSATU), Datuk Wan Saiful Wan Jan and Wan Ahmad Fayhsal opens up a space for frank discussions on the internal dynamics of BERSATU, the power struggle between the Muhyiddin Yassin, Azmin Ali and Hamzah Zainuddin blocs, and the direction of Perikatan Nasional ahead of the 16th Malaysian General Election.
177	Na'imah Abdul Khalid	2:20:59	November 14, 2025	link at Youtube
Widow and the third wife of the former Minister of Finance, Tun Daim Zainuddin, Toh Puan Na'imah Abdul Khalid shares the personal side and stories behind the scenes of Tun Daim's life; his calmness in making big decisions, his closeness with Tun Dr. Mahathir Mohamad, and his role as a "problem solver" behind the scenes of power.
178	Tengku Zafrul Aziz	1:35:57	November 17, 2025	link at Youtube
Minister of Investment, Trade and Industry, Senator Datuk Seri Utama Tengku Zafrul Tengku Abdul Aziz explains in depth the issue of the Malaysia-United States Reciprocal Trade Agreement (ART 2025) which was signed in conjunction with President Donald Trump's official visit to Malaysia.
179	Amirudin Shari: Part 2	1:53:56	November 21, 2025	link at Youtube
16th Menteri Besar of Selangor and Vice President of the People's Justice Party (PKR), Dato' Seri Amirudin Shari discusses on the essence of the Selangor Budget 2026, including the state's education priorities, economic development strategies, and commitment to the welfare of the people.
180	Syed Gaddafi Syed Saifuddin	1:17:52	November 26, 2025	link at Youtube
The CEO of GNI Pharma, Syed Gaddafi Syed Saifuddin discusses the challenges facing local digital entrepreneurs such as competitive pressures on e-commerce platforms, product safety standards issues, unbalanced pricing models, and strategies to ensure SMEs remain competitive in the digital economy.
181	Philip Golingai	1:25:17	December 1, 2025	link at Youtube
Senior News Editor of Star Media Group, Philip Golingai offers a Sabahan perspective on the fall of Democratic Action Party (DAP), the decline of UMNO, the resilience of Sabah Heritage Party (WARISAN), the wave of Chinese votes and the dynamics of KDM. Discussions also cover the prospects of the Sabah Cabinet, the possible transition of the Chief Minister and the national implications for PH, BN and the upcoming GE.

=== 2026 ===
No.	Guest(s)	Running time	Original release date	Link
188	Muhamad Akmal Saleh	1:53:33	February 11, 2026	link at Youtube
15th Youth Chief of UMNO Malaysia and Member of the Malacca State Executive Council, Datuk Dr. Akmal Saleh, shares his journey in the world of politics, the challenges of being a young leader, and his outspoken image that often sparks debate.
196	Rais Yatim	1:32:51	April 30, 2026	link at Youtube
8th Menteri Besar of Negeri Sembilan, Tan Sri Rais Yatim dissects the turmoil that began in April 2026, from the throne crisis when the Undang Yang Empat made a statement to dethrone the Yang di-Pertuan Besar of Negeri Sembilan, including the issue of the dismissal of Mubarak Dohak, the Undang of Sungai Ujong.
198	Chua Soi Lek	1:53:53	May 12, 2026	link at Youtube
9th President of the Malaysian Chinese Association, Tan Sri Dr. Chua Soi Lek discusses the causes of MCA's downfall as well as the changing pattern of Chinese voters' support for Barisan Nasional since the 2008 GE.
200	Onn Hafiz Ghazi	1:59:26	May 25, 2026	link at Youtube
19th Menteri Besar of Johor, Dato' Onn Hafiz touches on leadership, politics, economics, and the future of Johor. The discussion also touches on how Johor has managed to emerge as the state with the highest investment recipient in Malaysia, the strategic JS-SEZ project, as well as current political issues, including the decision of BN Johor to go solo in the upcoming Johor state election.

== See also ==
- Political podcast
- The Rest is Politics
- Leading
