= Nori Abdullah =

Spouse of Khairy Jamaluddin

- نوري عبدالله

Chairperson of the Yayasan Budi Penyayang Malaysia
- Incumbent
- Assumed office 20 October 2005
- Preceded by: Endon Mahmood

Member of the Board of Trustees of the Yayasan Budi Penyayang Malaysia
- Incumbent
- Assumed office 2 August 2000 Serving with Abd Rahim Mohamad, Kamaluddin Abdullah, Francis Lau Tuang Nguang, Jasmy Ismail and Azlinda Azman
- Preceded by: Position established

Personal details
- Born: Nori binti Abdullah; 24 July 1976 (age 49) Kuala Lumpur, Malaysia
- Citizenship: Malaysian
- Party: United Malay National Organisation (UMNO)
- Other political affiliations: Barisan Nasional (BN)
- Spouse: Khairy Jamaluddin (m. 2001)
- Children: 3
- Parents: Abdullah Ahmad Badawi (father); Endon Mahmood (mother)
- Relatives: Kamaluddin Abdullah (brother)
- Education: Convent Bukit Nanas High School; International School of Kuala Lumpur
- Alma mater: Syracuse University (BA)

Nori binti Abdullah (Jawi: نوري بنت عبدالله; born 24 July 1976) is a Malaysian politician who is the daughter of 5th Prime Minister of Malaysia, Abdullah Ahmad Badawi and Endon Mahmood. She is also the wife of Khairy Jamaluddin, former chief of UMNO Youth from 2008 to 2018. She has been serving as the chairperson of Yayasan Budi Penyayang Malaysia (PENYAYANG) since October 2005 after her mother's death. She is also one of the founding member of the Puteri UMNO Malaysia.

== Early life and education ==
Nori binti Abdullah was born in Kuala Lumpur, Malaysia on 24 July 1976. She is of the Arab–Chinese–Japanese–Malay descent. Her brother is Kamaluddin Abdullah. She had her secondary education at the Convent Bukit Nanas High School and the International School of Kuala Lumpur (ISKL). She received her Bachelor of Arts (BA) in International Relations from the Syracuse University (SU).

== Career ==
Nori began her career at the International Institute for Strategic Studies (IISS) Malaysia in 1999, where she is currently a visiting fellow. In 2003, she joined Noordin Sopiee & Associates (NSA), which conducts research and political analysis of current affairs, as a deputy editor and was appointed editor in 2004. Following the death of Noordin Sopiee, she now serves as the executive chairperson of NSA.

Nori is also a founding member of Puteri UMNO, the youth women's wing of Malaysia's largest political party, the United Malays National Organisation, and was a member of the movement's Executive Council for the 2002–2004 term. She currently serves on the Malaysia National Youth Consultative Council, a representative body that works with the Ministry of Youth and Sports on policy issues.

On 2 August 2000, she co-founded the Yayasan Budi Penyayang Malaysia (PENYAYANG) with her mother, Endon Mahmood, where she served as the board of trustees with her brother, Kamaluddin Abdullah, Abd Rahim Mohamad, Francis Lau Tuang Nguang, Jasmy Ismail and Azlinda Azman. After her mother's death on 20 October 2005 due to breast cancer, she has been the chairperson and board of trustees of PENYAYANG.

== Personal life ==
In October 2001, Nori married Khairy Jamaluddin (born 1976). The couple have three sons, Jibreil Ali Khairy (born 2007), Timor Abdullah Khairy (born 2008) and Raif Averroes Khairy (born 2015). In April 2016, her husband Khairy has opened up about their second son, Timor Abdullah who has Autism Spectrum Disorder (ASD).
