= Danial Al-Rashid =

Malaysian politician

Yang Berhormat Tuan Danial Al Rashid Haron Aminar Rashid MLA
- دانيال الرشيد هارون أمين الرشيد

Deputy Youth Chief of the National Trust Party
- Incumbent
- Assumed office 17 December 2023
- President: Mohamad Sabu
- Youth Chief: Mohd Hasbie Muda
- Preceded by: Muhammad Taqiuddin Cheman

State Youth Chief of the National Trust Party of Selangor
- In office 2019–2023
- President: Mohamad Sabu
- State Chairman: Izham Hashim
- National Youth Chief: Hasnul Zulkarnain Abdul Munaim (2019–2020); Shazni Munir Mohd Ithnin (2020–2021); Mohd Hasbie Muda (2021–2023)
- Preceded by: Abbas Salimi Azmi

Member of the Selangor State Legislative Assembly for Batu Tiga
- Incumbent
- Assumed office 12 August 2023
- Preceded by: Rodziah Ismail (PH–PKR)
- Majority: 3,382 (2023)

Personal details
- Born: Danial Al Rashid bin Haron Aminar Rashid; 11 September 1985 (age 40) Kuala Lumpur, Malaysia
- Citizenship: Malaysian
- Party: National Trust Party (AMANAH)
- Other political affiliations: Pakatan Harapan (PH)
- Spouse: Zatil Arifah Mohd Amin
- Children: 4
- Parent(s): Harun Salim Bachik (father); Martina Ahmad (mother); Suriati Mohd Noor (stepmother)
- Education: Universiti Teknologi MARA, Perlis (Bachelor's degree in Mathematics Management)
- Occupation: Politician

Danial Al Rashid bin Haron Aminar Rashid (born 11 September 1985) is a Malaysian politician who has served as Member of the Selangor State Legislative Assembly (MLA) for Batu Tiga since August 2023. He served as the Special Officer to former Member of the Selangor State Executive Council (EXCO) and former MLA for Seri Serdang Siti Mariah Mahmud, Head of the Selangor Special Children Department (ANIS) and Head of the Selangor Children Heritage Department from 2020 to 2023 as well as Member of the Shah Alam City Council (MBSA) from August 2018 to December 2020. He is a member of the National Trust Party (AMANAH), a component party of the Pakatan Harapan (PH) coalition. He has also served as the Deputy Youth Chief of AMANAH since December 2023 and the State Youth Chief of PH and AMANAH of Selangor from 2019 to 2023. He is the second son of former actor and comedian Harun Salim Bachik.

== Early life and family ==
Danial Al Rashid was born as the second son to popular actor and comedian Harun Salim who appeared in many dramas on local television as father and his first wife Martinah Ahmad as mother in Kuala Lumpur, Malaysia on 11 September 1986. Danial Al Rashid described his father as being supportive of his chosen careers despite being odd compared to his siblings who followed the footsteps of his father instead.

== Education ==
Danial Al Rashid graduated from the Universiti Teknologi MARA, Perlis (UiTM, Perlis) with the Bachelor's degree in Mathematics Management in 2008. He has also decided to pursue a Master's degree at the University of Selangor (UNISEL) in Special Education after his 3 years of community-related tasks in his tenure as the Head of ANIS.

== Careers ==
Danial Al Rashid has worked in the public service, government, education, and social welfare for more than 15 years. As the Head of ANIS, a state government agency that focuses on the well-being and empowerment of students with special needs from 2020 to 2023, Danial Al Rashid managed assistance and development programmes and initiatives for special children and disabled people (OKU) in Selangor with a budget allocation of RM 4 million per year, ensured welfare and empowerment programs for stakeholders. Under his leadership, ANIS has introduced innovative initiatives, including the ANIS Education Support Center and the ANIS Pre-School Center.

Besides ANIS, Danial Al Rashid is also actively involved in the Selangor Disabled Action Council (MTOS), where he serves as a committee member and Head of the Advocacy Committee. In MTOS, he formulated and implemented policies to raise public awareness and establish partnerships for the benefit of the disabled community in Selangor.

In education, Danial Al Rashid has been an Adjunct Associate Professor at the School of Liberal Arts and Sciences, Taylor University since 2022 and an External Research Fellow at the Institute for the Study of Elections and the Advancement of Democracy (ISEAD) at UNISEL.

== Political career ==
=== Member of the Shah Alam City Council (2018–2020) ===
During his term as the MBSA Member, he was Deputy Chairman of the Audit and Corporate Management Committee and a member of committees of various portfolios ranging from finance, licensing, investment, trade, planning and objection hearing, administration, information and communications technology (ICT) to women and family development. Besides being part of a wide range of committees, he was also involved in Budget Workshops and MBSA Review Meetings in 2018, 2019 and 2022. He also provided insights and feedback on budget allocations and planning, based on the needs and priorities of the Shah Alam people.

=== Member of the Selangor State Legislative Assembly (since 2023) ===
==== 2023 Selangor state election ====
In the 2023 Selangor state election, Danial Al Rashid made his electoral debut after being nominated by PH to contest the Batu Tiga state seat. Danial Al Rashid won the seat and was elected to the Selangor State Legislative Assembly as the Batu Tiga MLA for the first term after defeating former Minister of Women, Family and Community Development Rina Harun of Perikatan Nasional (PN) and Syaidiyah Izzati Nur Razak Maideen @ Cheda Razak of the Malaysian United Democratic Alliance (MUDA) by a majority of 3,382 votes.

During the campaigning period of the state election, Danial Al Rashid, as a son of popular actor and comedian Harun Salim, has reiterated that he would not use the popularity of his father to garner support. He also refused to describe himself as an underdog even having to contest against political heavyweight Rina who was a Cabinet minister. He also compared the Selangor state government led by Menteri Besar Amirudin Shari and the federal government led by Prime Minister Ismail Sabri Yaakob. He rated the former much higher than the latter in terms of the satisfaction of the people and reach of the initiatives implemented.

As the Batu Tiga MLA, he participated in legislative and policymaking activities state level and took part in drafting and evaluating the state budget. He also pledged to increase public involvement in the progress of Batu Tiga by taking the interests of the stakeholders in each proposed development projects of basic amenities and public infrastructure into important consideration to ensure their sustainability. Moreover, he promised to foster relevant job opportunities so the Batu Tiga people can thrive and contribute to the families and communities. He also aimed to take women to the greater attention by strengthening their social involvement through Selangor state government programmes and emphasised the need to bring young people into development process. On the gig economy, he also stressed that training and empowerment of the independent workers and freelancers with new skills to find better employment opportunities and transform the local labour market. On this, he highlighted the opportunity to align the gig economy with local industries in Batu Tiga to boost productivity and reduce costs.

== Election results ==
Selangor State Legislative Assembly
Year	Constituency	Candidate	Votes	Pct	Opponent(s)	Votes	Pct	Ballots cast	Majority	Turnout
2023	N41 Batu Tiga	Danial Al Rashid Haron Aminar Rashid (AMANAH)	29,064	51.30%	Rina Harun (BERSATU)	25,682	45.33%	56,654	3,382	75.05%
2023	N41 Batu Tiga	Danial Al Rashid Haron Aminar Rashid (AMANAH)	29,064	51.30%	Syaidiyah Izzati Nur Razak Maideen @ Cheda Razak (MUDA)	1,908	3.37%	56,654	3,382	75.05%
