= Rodziah Ismail =

Malaysian politician

Yang Berhormat Puan Rodziah Ismail MP
- راضية إسماعيل
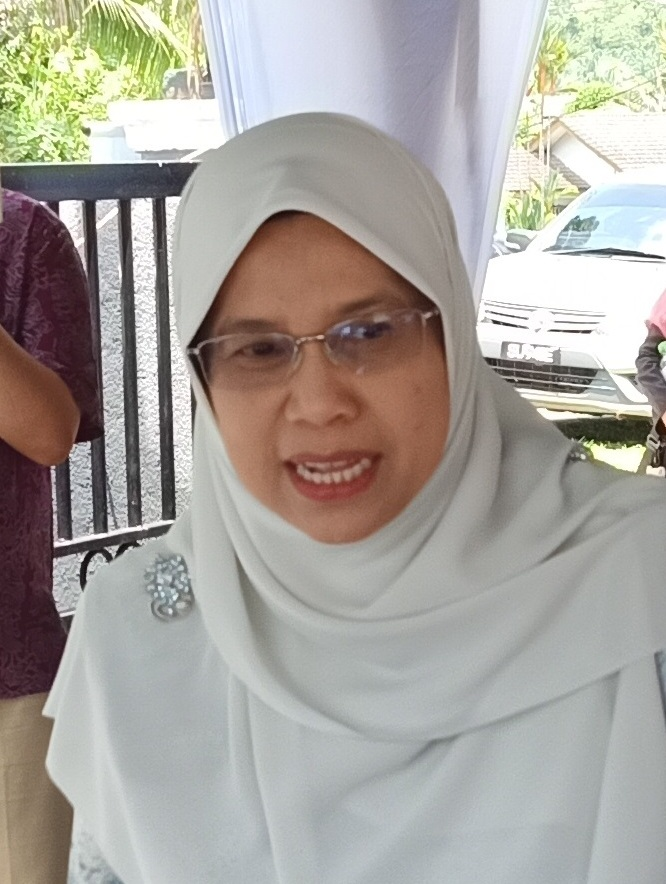
- Rodziah Ismail in 2025

Member of the Malaysian Parliament for Ampang
- Incumbent
- Assumed office 19 November 2022
- Preceded by: Zuraida Kamaruddin (PH–PKR)
- Majority: 29,681 (2022)

Member of the Selangor State Executive Council (Welfare, Women Affairs, Science, Technology and Innovation: 25 March 2008–29 May 2013) (Welfare and Women Affairs: 30 May 2013–14 August 2014) (Entrepreneur Development, Rural Development and Traditional Village: 19 June 2018–6 October 2020) (Entrepreneur Development, Housing and Urban Wellbeing: 7 October 2020–21 August 2023)
- In office 19 June 2018 – 21 August 2023
- Monarch: Sharafuddin
- Menteri Besar: Amirudin Shari
- Preceded by: Amirudin Shari
- Succeeded by: Borhan Aman Shah (Housing and Urban Wellbeing); Najwan Halimi (Entrepreneur Development)
- Constituency: Batu Tiga
- In office 25 March 2008 – 14 August 2014
- Monarch: Sharafuddin
- Menteri Besar: Khalid Ibrahim
- Preceded by: Seripah Noli Syed Hussin (Welfare and Women Affairs); Ch’ng Toh Eng (Science, Technology and Innovation)
- Succeeded by: Daroyah Alwi
- Constituency: Batu Tiga

Member of the Selangor State Legislative Assembly for Batu Tiga
- In office 8 March 2008 – 12 August 2023
- Preceded by: Salamon Selamat (BN–UMNO)
- Succeeded by: Danial Al Rashid Haron Aminar Rashid (PH–AMANAH)
- Majority: 3,563 (2008); 3,805 (2013); 15,616 (2018)

Personal details
- Born: Rodziah binti Ismail; 8 July 1964 (age 62) Ipoh, Perak, Malaysia
- Citizenship: Malaysian
- Party: People's Justice Party (PKR)
- Other political affiliations: Pakatan Rakyat (PR) (2008–2015); Pakatan Harapan (PH) (since 2015)
- Education: University of Technology, Malaysia
- Occupation: Politician

Rodziah binti Ismail (born 8 July 1964) is a Malaysian politician who has served the Member of Parliament (MP) for Ampang since November 2022. She served as Member of the Selangor State Executive Council (EXCO) in the Pakatan Rakyat (PR) and Pakatan Harapan (PH) state administrations under Menteris Besar Khalid Ibrahim, Azmin Ali and Amirudin Shari from March 2008 to her resignation in August 2014 and again from May 2018 to August 2023 as well as Member of the Selangor State Legislative Assembly (MLA) for Batu Tiga from March 2008 to August 2023. She is a member of the People's Justice Party (PKR), a component party of PH and formerly PR coalitions.

== Election results ==
Selangor State Legislative Assembly
Year	Constituency	Candidate	Votes	Pct	Opponent(s)	Votes	Pct	Ballots cast	Majority	Turnout
2008	N41 Batu Tiga	Rodziah Ismail (PKR)	15,852	56.33%	Salamon Selamat (UMNO)	12,289	43.67%	28,526	3,563	77.32%
2013	N41 Batu Tiga	Rodziah Ismail (PKR)	21,284	54.73%	Ahmad Nawawi M. Zin (UMNO)	17,479	44.95%	33,390	3,805	87.52%
2013	N41 Batu Tiga	Rodziah Ismail (PKR)	21,284	54.73%	Mohd Uzi Che Hussein (IND)	124	0.32%	33,390	3,805	87.52%
2018	N41 Batu Tiga	Rodziah Ismail (PKR)	27,638	58.24%	Ahmad Mua'adzam Shah Ya'akop (UMNO)	12,022	25.33%	47,943	15,616	87.12%
2018	N41 Batu Tiga	Rodziah Ismail (PKR)	27,638	58.24%	Abdul Halim Omar (PAS)	7,793	16.42%	47,943	15,616	87.12%

Year	Constituency	Candidate	Votes	Pct	Opponent(s)	Votes	Pct	Ballots cast	Majority	Turnout
2022	P099 Ampang	Rodziah Ismail (PKR)	56,754	54.35%	Sasha Lyna Abdul Latif (BERSATU)	27,073	25.92%	104,432	29,681	78.23%
2022	P099 Ampang	Rodziah Ismail (PKR)	56,754	54.35%	Ivone Low Yi Wen (MCA)	11,509	11.02%	104,432	29,681	78.23%
2022	P099 Ampang	Rodziah Ismail (PKR)	56,754	54.35%	Zuraida Kamaruddin (PBM)	4,589	4.39%	104,432	29,681	78.23%
2022	P099 Ampang	Rodziah Ismail (PKR)	56,754	54.35%	Nurul Ashikin Mabahwi (PEJUANG)	2,653	2.54%	104,432	29,681	78.23%
2022	P099 Ampang	Rodziah Ismail (PKR)	56,754	54.35%	Lai Wai Chong (WARISAN)	1,423	1.36%	104,432	29,681	78.23%
2022	P099 Ampang	Rodziah Ismail (PKR)	56,754	54.35%	Muhammad Syafiq Izwan Mohd Yunos (IND)	188	0.18%	104,432	29,681	78.23%
2022	P099 Ampang	Rodziah Ismail (PKR)	56,754	54.35%	Raveendran Marnokaran (IND)	148	0.14%	104,432	29,681	78.23%
2022	P099 Ampang	Rodziah Ismail (PKR)	56,754	54.35%	Tan Hua Meng (IND)	93	0.09%	104,432	29,681	78.23%

== Honours ==
=== Honours of Malaysia ===
- Malaysia
  - Recipient of the 17th Yang di-Pertuan Agong Installation Medal (2024)
