= Batu Tiga (state constituency) =

State constituency in Selangor, Malaysia

Batu Tiga (N41)
Selangor constituency

State constituency
- Legislature: Selangor State Legislative Assembly
MLA
Danial Al Rashid Haron Aminar Rashid
PH
- Constituency created: 1984
- First contested: 1986
- Last contested: 2023

Demographics
- Electors (2023): 75,486

Batu Tiga is a state constituency in Selangor, Malaysia, that has been represented in the Selangor State Legislative Assembly since 1986.

The state constituency was created in the 1984 redistribution and is mandated to return a single member to the Selangor State Legislative Assembly under the first past the post voting system.

== Demographics ==
Ethnic breakdown of Batu Tiga's electorate as of 2023
1. Malay (74.9%)
2. Indian (15.4%)
3. Chinese (7.47%)
4. Other ethnicities (2.19%)

== History ==
=== Polling districts ===
According to the gazette issued on 30 March 2018, the Batu Tiga constituency has a total of 20 polling districts.

| State constituency | Polling districts | Code | Location |
|---|---|---|---|
| Batu Tiga（N41） | Taman Bukit Tiga | 108/41/01 | Balai Masyarakat Taman Alam Intan Batu 3 |
| Batu Tiga（N41） | Kampung Kebun Bunga | 108/41/02 | KAFA Integrasi Fastabiqul Khairat |
| Batu Tiga（N41） | Pinggiran USJ | 108/41/03 | Kolej Vokasional Shah Alam (SM Vokasional Shah Alam, Jalan Batu Tiga) |
| Batu Tiga（N41） | Shah Alam S 20 - S 23 | 108/40/04 | SK Seksyen 20 Shah Alam |
| Batu Tiga（N41） | Shah Alam S 19/15 - 19/31 | 108/40/05 | SRA Integrasi Seksyen 19 |
| Batu Tiga（N41） | Shah Alam S 19/1 - S 19/14 | 108/40/06 | SK Seksyen 19 |
| Batu Tiga（N41） | Shah Alam S 24/1 - 24/38 | 108/41/07 | SK Seksyen 4 |
| Batu Tiga（N41） | Apartment S24 | 108/40/08 | Kolej Tingkatan 6, Jalan Timun 24/1 |
| Batu Tiga（N41） | Shah Alam S 7 Timur | 108/41/09 | SK Seksyen 17 Shah Alam |
| Batu Tiga（N41） | Padang Jawa | 108/41/10 | SK Padang Jawa Klang |
| Batu Tiga（N41） | Sungai Rasau | 108/41/11 | SJK (C) Taman Rashna Klang |
| Batu Tiga（N41） | Kampung Kuantan | 108/41/12 | SMK Sultan Abdul Samad Jalan Landasan Bukit Kuda Klang |
| Batu Tiga（N41） | Taman Kampung Kuantan | 108/41/13 | SK Bukit Kuda Jalan Landasan Klang |
| Batu Tiga（N41） | Shah Alam S 17 Barat | 108/41/14 | SM Pendidikan Khas Vokasional Seksyen 17 Shah Alam |
| Batu Tiga（N41） | Rimba Jaya | 108/41/15 | SRA Padang Jawa Klang |
| Batu Tiga（N41） | Shah Alam S 19/32 - 19/50 | 108/41/16 | SMK Seksyen 19 |
| Batu Tiga（N41） | Shah Alam S 24 | 108/41/17 | SMK Seksyen 24 (2) Shah Alam |
| Batu Tiga（N41） | Shah Alam S 18 Barat 1 | 108/41/18 | SK Seksyen 18 Shah Alam |
| Batu Tiga（N41） | Shah Alan S 18 Timur | 108/41/19 | SMK Seksyen 18 Shah Alam |
| Batu Tiga（N41） | Shah Alam S 18 Barat 2 | 108/41/20 | SK Pendidikan Khas Selangor |

=== Representation history ===
Members of the Legislative Assembly for Batu Tiga
| Assembly | No | Years | Member | Party |
Constituency created from Bukit Raja, Sementa and Kampong Jawa
| 7th | N32 | 1986–1990 | Mohd Zain Sulaiman | BN (UMNO) |
| 8th | N32 | 1990–1995 | Mohd Zain Sulaiman | BN (UMNO) |
| 9th | N35 | 1995–1999 | Abu Sujak Mahmud | BN (UMNO) |
| 10th | N35 | 1999–2004 | Salamon Selamat | BN (UMNO) |
| 11th | N41 | 2004–2008 | Salamon Selamat | BN (UMNO) |
| 12th | N41 | 2008–2013 | Rodziah Ismail | PR (PKR) |
| 13th | N41 | 2013–2015 | Rodziah Ismail | PR (PKR) |
| 13th | N41 | 2015–2018 | Rodziah Ismail | PH (PKR) |
| 14th | N41 | 2018–2023 | Rodziah Ismail | PH (PKR) |
| 15th | N41 | 2023–present | Danial Al Rashid Haron Aminar Rashid | PH (AMANAH) |

== Election results ==
Selangor state election, 2023
| Party | Candidate | Votes | % | ∆% |
|---|---|---|---|---|
| PH | Danial Al Rashid Haron Aminar Rashid | 29,064 | 51.30 | ▼6.94 |
| PN | Rina Harun | 25,682 | 45.33 | ▲45.33 |
| MUDA | Cheda Razak @ Saiyidah Izzati Nur Razak Maideen | 1,908 | 3.37 | ▲3.37 |
| Total valid votes | | 56,654 | 100.00 | |
| Total rejected ballots | | 348 | | |
| Unreturned ballots | | 67 | | |
| Turnout | | 57,069 | 75.60 | ▼11.52 |
| Registered electors | | 75,486 | | |
| Majority | | 3,382 | 5.97 | ▼26.94 |
| PH hold | | Swing | | |

Selangor state election, 2018
| Party | Candidate | Votes | % | ∆% |
|---|---|---|---|---|
| PKR | Rodziah Ismail | 27,638 | 58.24 | ▲3.51 |
| BN | Ahmad Mua'adzam Shah Ya'akop | 12,022 | 25.33 | ▼19.62 |
| PAS | Abdul Halim Omar | 7,793 | 16.42 | ▲16.42 |
| Total valid votes | | 47,453 | 100.00 | |
| Total rejected ballots | | 379 | | |
| Unreturned ballots | | 111 | | |
| Turnout | | 47,943 | 87.12 | ▼0.40 |
| Registered electors | | 55,034 | | |
| Majority | | 15,616 | 32.91 | ▲23.19 |
| PKR hold | | Swing | | |

Selangor state election, 2013
| Party | Candidate | Votes | % | ∆% |
|---|---|---|---|---|
| PKR | Rodziah Ismail | 21,284 | 54.73 | ▼1.60 |
| BN | Ahmad Nawawi M. Zin | 17,479 | 44.95 | ▲1.28 |
| Independent | Mohd Uzi Che Hussin | 124 | 0.32 | ▲0.32 |
| Total valid votes | | 38,887 | 100.00 | |
| Total rejected ballots | | 432 | | |
| Unreturned ballots | | 71 | | |
| Turnout | | 39,390 | 87.52 | ▲10.20 |
| Registered electors | | 45,005 | | |
| Majority | | 3,805 | 9.78 | ▼12.88 |
| PKR hold | | Swing | | |
Source(s) "Federal Government Gazette - Notice of Contested Election, State Legislative Assembly for the State of Selangor [P.U. (B) 192/2013]" (PDF). Attorney General's Chambers of Malaysia. 26 April 2013. Archived from the original (PDF) on 29 December 2019. "Federal Government Gazette - Results of Contested Election and Statements of the Poll after the Official Addition of Votes, State Constituencies for the State of Selangor [P.U. (B) 233/2013]" (PDF). Attorney General's Chambers of Malaysia. 22 May 2013. Archived from the original (PDF) on 2 October 2018.

Selangor state election, 2008
| Party | Candidate | Votes | % | ∆% |
|---|---|---|---|---|
| PKR | Rodziah Ismail | 15,852 | 56.33 | ▲10.57 |
| BN | Salamon Selamat | 12,289 | 43.67 | ▼10.57 |
| Total valid votes | | 28,141 | 100.00 | |
| Total rejected ballots | | 346 | | |
| Unreturned ballots | | 39 | | |
| Turnout | | 28,526 | 77.32 | ▲2.10 |
| Registered electors | | 36,892 | | |
| Majority | | 3,563 | 12.66 | ▼15.82 |
| PKR gain from BN | | Swing | | ? |

Selangor state election, 2004
| Party | Candidate | Votes | % | ∆% |
|---|---|---|---|---|
| BN | Salamon Selamat | 16,666 | 64.24 | ▲9.84 |
| PKR | Shaari Abdul Malik | 9,279 | 35.76 | ▲35.76 |
| Total valid votes | | 25,945 | 100.00 | |
| Total rejected ballots | | 353 | | |
| Unreturned ballots | | 7 | | |
| Turnout | | 26,305 | 75.22 | ▼2.81 |
| Registered electors | | 34,972 | | |
| Majority | | 7,387 | 28.48 | ▲19.68 |
| BN hold | | Swing | | |

Selangor state election, 1999
| Party | Candidate | Votes | % | ∆% |
|---|---|---|---|---|
| BN | Salamon Selamat | 10,967 | 54.40 | ▼27.73 |
| PAS | Mahfodz Mohamed | 9,194 | 45.60 | ▲27.73 |
| Total valid votes | | 20,161 | 100.00 | |
| Total rejected ballots | | 275 | | |
| Unreturned ballots | | 201 | | |
| Turnout | | 20,637 | 78.03 | ▲6.06 |
| Registered electors | | 26,448 | | |
| Majority | | 1,773 | 8.80 | ▼55.46 |
| BN hold | | Swing | | |

Selangor state election, 1995
| Party | Candidate | Votes | % | ∆% |
|---|---|---|---|---|
| BN | Abu Sujak Mahmud | 14,112 | 82.13 | ▲11.62 |
| PAS | Wan Ahmad Othman | 3,071 | 17.87 | ▼11.62 |
| Total valid votes | | 17,183 | 100.00 | |
| Total rejected ballots | | 311 | | |
| Unreturned ballots | | 0 | | |
| Turnout | | 17,494 | 71.97 | ▼2.80 |
| Registered electors | | 24,308 | | |
| Majority | | 11,041 | 64.26 | ▲23.24 |
| BN hold | | Swing | | |

Selangor state election, 1990
| Party | Candidate | Votes | % | ∆% |
|---|---|---|---|---|
| BN | Mohd Zain Sulaiman | 19,635 | 70.51 | ▼7.81 |
| PAS | Yaakop Abu Hasan | 8,214 | 29.49 | ▲7.81 |
| Total valid votes | | 27,849 | 100.00 | |
| Total rejected ballots | | 693 | | |
| Unreturned ballots | | 0 | | |
| Turnout | | 28,542 | 74.77 | ▲12.05 |
| Registered electors | | 38,172 | | |
| Majority | | 11,421 | 41.02 | ▼15.62 |
| BN hold | | Swing | | |

Selangor state election, 1986
| Party | Candidate | Votes | % |
|---|---|---|---|
| BN | Mohd Zain Sulaiman | 10,540 | 78.32 |
| PAS | Mustafar Ab. Kadir | 2,917 | 21.68 |
| Total valid votes | | 13,457 | 100.00 |
| Total rejected ballots | | 412 | |
| Unreturned ballots | | 0 | |
| Turnout | | 13,869 | 62.72 |
| Registered electors | | 22,112 | |
| Majority | | 7,623 | 56.64 |
This was a new constituency created.
