= Rina Harun =

Malaysian politician

Yang Berbahagia Datuk Seri Rina Harun DGSM BCM PJK
- رينا هارون
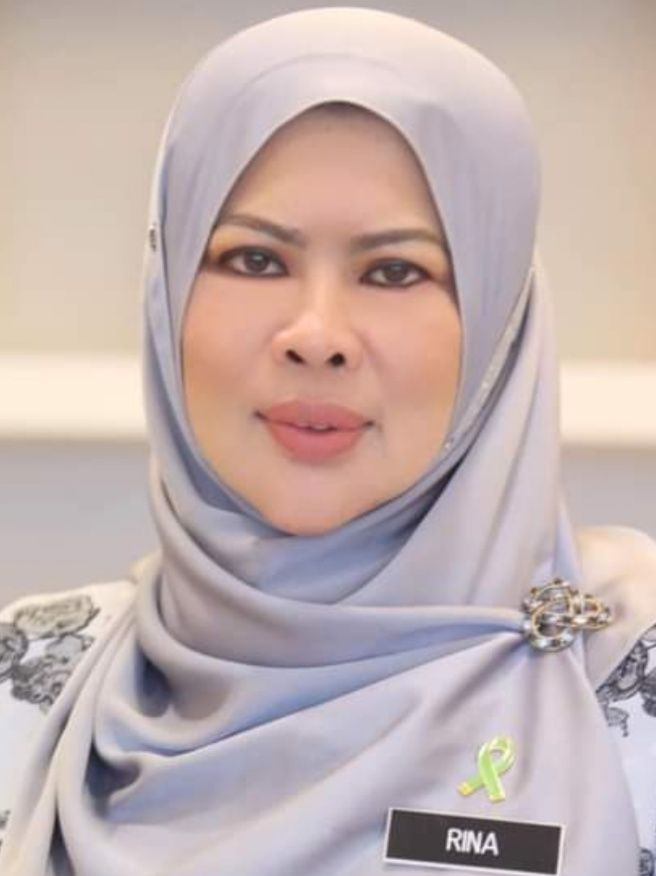

Minister of Women, Family and Community Development
- In office 30 August 2021 – 24 November 2022
- Monarch: Abdullah
- Prime Minister: Ismail Sabri Yaakob
- Deputy: Siti Zailah Mohd Yusoff
- Preceded by: Herself
- Succeeded by: Nancy Shukri
- Constituency: Titiwangsa
- In office 10 March 2020 – 16 August 2021
- Monarch: Abdullah
- Prime Minister: Muhyiddin Yassin
- Deputy: Siti Zailah Mohd Yusoff
- Preceded by: Wan Azizah Wan Ismail
- Succeeded by: Herself
- Constituency: Titiwangsa

Minister of Rural Development
- In office 21 May 2018 – 24 February 2020
- Monarchs: Muhammad V (2018–2019); Abdullah (2019–2020)
- Prime Minister: Mahathir Mohamad
- Deputy: Sivarasa Rasiah
- Preceded by: Ismail Sabri Yaakob as Minister of Rural and Regional Development
- Succeeded by: Abdul Latiff Ahmad
- Constituency: Titiwangsa

Member of the Malaysian Parliament for Titiwangsa
- In office 9 May 2018 – 19 November 2022
- Preceded by: Johari Abdul Ghani (BN–UMNO)
- Succeeded by: Johari Abdul Ghani (BN–UMNO)
- Majority: 4,139 (2018)

2nd Treasurer-General of the Malaysian United Indigenous Party
- Incumbent
- Assumed office 28 November 2024
- President: Muhyiddin Yassin
- Preceded by: Mohamed Salleh Bajuri

1st Women Chief of the Malaysian United Indigenous Party
- In office 5 April 2017 – 28 October 2024
- President: Muhyiddin Yassin
- Deputy: Shamsilah Siru (2017–2020); Mas Ermieyati Samsudin (2020–2024)
- Chairman: Mahathir Mohamad (2017–2020); Muhyiddin Yassin (Acting) (2020)
- Succeeded by: Mas Ermieyati Samsudin

Faction represented in Dewan Rakyat
- 2018–2020: Pakatan Harapan
- 2020: Malaysian United Indigenous Party
- 2020–: Perikatan Nasional

Personal details
- Born: Rina binti Mohd Harun; 18 April 1973 (age 53) Tanjung Karang, Selangor, Malaysia
- Citizenship: Malaysian
- Party: United Malays National Organisation (UMNO) (until 2016); Malaysian United Indigenous Party (BERSATU) (since 2016)
- Other political affiliations: Barisan Nasional (BN) (until 2016); Pakatan Harapan (PH) (2017–2020); Perikatan Nasional (PN) (since 2020)
- Education: Northwood University; MARA University of Technology
- Occupation: Politician
- Website: www.rinaharun.com
- Rina Harun on Facebook; Rina Harun on Parliament of Malaysia

Rina binti Mohd Harun (Jawi: رينا بنت محمد هارون) is a Malaysian politician who served as Minister of Women, Family and Community Development for the second term in the Barisan Nasional (BN) administration under former prime minister Ismail Sabri Yaakob from August 2021 to the collapse of the BN administration in November 2022 and the first term in the Perikatan Nasional (PN) administration under former Prime Minister Muhyiddin Yassin from March 2020 to August 2021, Minister of Rural Development in the Pakatan Harapan (PH) administration under former Prime Minister Mahathir Mohamad from May 2018 to the collapse of the PH administration in February 2020. She also served as the Member of Parliament (MP) for Titiwangsa from May 2018 to November 2022. She is a member of the Malaysian United Indigenous Party (BERSATU), a component party of the PN coalition. She has served as the Treasurer-General of BERSATU since November 2024. She also served as the 1st Women Chief of BERSATU from April 2017 to October 2024. Prior to joining BERSATU at its inception in 2016, she was a United Malays National Organisation (UMNO) member.

== Early life ==
Rina was born on 18 April 1973 in Tanjung Karang, Selangor. She grew up in Jalan Gurney, Kampung Datuk Keramat, Kuala Lumpur and earned an early education at Sekolah Kebangsaan Datuk Keramat 1, Kuala Lumpur. She then continued her studies at Sekolah Tun Fatimah before continuing her studies at the MARA Institute of Technology (now Universiti Teknologi MARA) in Diploma in Banking Studies.

== Early career ==
Rina worked in commercial banking industry for eight years before she decided to focus on politics.

== Early political career ==
UMNO

- Sepang Women's Youth UMNO Division Chief – 2002–2013
- Secretary of Selangor UMNO Women's Youth – 2002–2004
- Deputy Chief of Selangor UMNO Women's Youth – 2004–2006
- Selangor UMNO Deputy Women's Youth Chief – 2009
- EXCO of UMNO Women's Chief – 2009–2013
- UMNO Acting Women Chief of Bandar Baru Salak Tinggi – 2013–2016

PPBM

- Srikandi Chief

Pakatan Harapan

- Deputy Women Chief

== Non-governmental organisations ==
- Assistant Treasurer, Selangor Youth Council
- Sepang District Youth Council Committee
- Pro-chancellor, University of Kuala Lumpur

== Ministerial career ==
=== Minister of Rural Development (2018–2020) ===
After winning her first ever election at Titiwangsa in 2018 general election, Rina was appointed to Mahathir's cabinet as Minister of Rural Development by the new administration of Pakatan Harapan (PH).

Rina launched Harapan's Plan on Rural Development 2018–2023 in October 2018. The plan aims to make rural areas more conducive, inclusive, and sustainable. It concentrates on six key areas: infrastructure, economy, entrepreneurship, human capital, women, and delivery system. The strategy also aimed to prevent project overlap between the federal and state governments, emphasising the importance of both parties sitting down and working together to achieve holistic development. According to her ministry's records, the plan has benefited up to 500,000 rural communities as of April 2019.

=== Minister of Women, Family and Community Development (2020–2022) ===
During the Sheraton Move in early 2020, which saw the ousting of the elected Pakatan Harapan government, Rina gave Muhyiddin Yassin, the President of BERSATU, votes of confidence. She was later appointed as Minister of Women, Family and Community Development in Muhyiddin's cabinet.

==== Anti-Sexual Harassment Bill ====
In December 2021, the Anti-Sexual Harassment Bill 2021 was tabled by the deputy minister under her, PAS's Siti Zailah. "This bill, with a comprehensive definition of sexual harassment, will contribute towards creating a safe environment for the community, especially women", said Rina. Victims of sexual harassment will be protected through the enactment of the bill, which allows them to receive compensation of up to RM250,000 from the perpetrators. According to Rina, the new bill is not intended to replace the current justice system, but rather to improve it so that it will cover all areas, not just workplaces.

However, during the previous year, Rina Harun was criticised after informing the Dewan Rakyat that the tabling of the Sexual Harassment Bill was delayed partly due to the change in government with the new Perikatan Nasional administration taking over from Pakatan Harapan in March 2020. AWAM called for a set date for the bill to be tabled in the future and expressed Rina's failure on not focusing on the bill for the entire year when the draft was already presented, and in effect the ministry has lost the chance to ensure that a proper budget allocation was secured during the 2021 budget debate to ensure an effective implementation.

==== Controversies ====
In her first month as Malaysia's women's affairs minister, Rina Harun caused controversy by posting two posters with sexist messages on the ministry's social media. One poster advised women not to nag their husbands if they did something that bothered them, but to use humour instead. Another poster emphasised the importance of a woman's appearance, even if she is working from home. Women's rights groups criticised the ministry for releasing these posters, urging them to focus on the increase of domestic abuse during Malaysian movement control order to contain COVID-19 spread.

Rina attracted both ridicule and criticism after she held a photo shoot showcasing various outfits at the official minister's office. Her weight loss prompted speculation of gastrectomy surgery.

Netizens criticized her for “glamming up” in the middle of an economic downturn, while her ministry seems to have little achievement since the beginning of the pandemic and movement control order (MCO) last year. Former CEO of the National Welfare Foundation (Malay: Yayasan Kebajikan Negara, YKN) Che Asmah Ibrahim released a public post on Facebook claiming that Rina's use of official space to model 2021 Hari Raya fashion during the pandemic was highly inappropriate.

In February 2021, Rina Harun came under scrutiny after she paid off an RM1.3mil debt to avoid bankruptcy, with opposition politicians demanding explanations on how she managed to pay such a large sum based on her salary as Women, Family and Community Development Minister. Through her now defunct company - Eurofine (M) Sdn Bhd, Fine Mobile Network Sdn Bhd and Fine TV Network Sdn Bhd – she had purchased several comedy shows and documentaries worth millions of ringgit from Sarl Novovision, a Paris-based production company between 2011 and 2013. She was earlier served with a bankruptcy notice for debts amounting to RM1,340,642.02. There were questions on how she had accumulated sufficient wealth and funds to pay off the huge debt in a short period of 15 months as the asset declaration data with Malaysian Anti-Corruption Commission showed that her assets stood at RM72,000 when the same was made public on Nov 20,2019, with an income of RM34,004.48 a month.

== Personal life ==
In January 2021, Rina was tested positive for COVID-19. Both she and her mother had recovered after treatment.

== Election results ==
Parliament of Malaysia
Year	Constituency	Candidate	Votes	Pct	Opponent(s)	Votes	Pct	Ballots cast	Majority	Turnout
2018	P119 Titiwangsa	Rina Mohd Harun (BERSATU)	23,840	47.31%	Johari Abdul Ghani (UMNO)	19,701	39.10%	50,858	4,139	82.56%
2018	P119 Titiwangsa	Rina Mohd Harun (BERSATU)	23,840	47.31%	Mohamad Nor Mohamad (PAS)	6,845	13.59%	50,858	4,139	82.56%
2022	P113 Sepang	Rina Mohd Harun (BERSATU)	47,315	34.30%	Aiman Athirah Sabu (AMANAH)	56,264	40.78%	137,955	8,949	83.1%
2022	P113 Sepang	Rina Mohd Harun (BERSATU)	47,315	34.30%	Anuar Basiran (UMNO)	31,097	22.54%	137,955	8,949	83.1%
2022	P113 Sepang	Rina Mohd Harun (BERSATU)	47,315	34.30%	Che Asmah Ibrahim (PEJUANG)	2,237	1.69%	137,955	8,949	83.1%
2022	P113 Sepang	Rina Mohd Harun (BERSATU)	47,315	34.30%	Mohd Syahrul Amri Mat Sari (IND)	319	0.23%	137,955	8,949	83.1%
2022	P113 Sepang	Rina Mohd Harun (BERSATU)	47,315	34.30%	Mohd Daud Leong Abdullah (PUR)	264	0.19%	137,955	8,949	83.1%
2022	P113 Sepang	Rina Mohd Harun (BERSATU)	47,315	34.30%	Muneswaran Muthiah (IND)	194	0.14%	137,955	8,949	83.1%
2022	P113 Sepang	Rina Mohd Harun (BERSATU)	47,315	34.30%	Nageswaran Ravi (PRM)	165	0.12%	137,955	8,949	83.1%

Selangor State Legislative Assembly
Year	Constituency	Candidate	Votes	Pct	Opponent(s)	Votes	Pct	Ballots cast	Majority	Turnout
2023	N41 Batu Tiga	Rina Mohd Harun (BERSATU)	25,682	45.33%	Danial Al Rashid Haron Aminar Rashid (AMANAH)	29,064	51.35%	56,654	3,382	75.05%
2023	N41 Batu Tiga	Rina Mohd Harun (BERSATU)	25,682	45.33%	Syaidiyah Izzati Nur Razak Maideen (MUDA)	1,908	3.37%	56,654	3,382	75.05%

== Honours ==
=== Honours of Malaysia ===
- Malacca
  - Grand Commander of the Exalted Order of Malacca (DGSM) – Datuk Seri (2018)
  - Recipient of the Distinguished Service Star (BCM) (2012)
- Selangor
  - Recipient of the Meritorious Service Medal (PJK) (2004)
