= Ampang (federal constituency) =

Federal constituency of Selangor, Malaysia

Ampang (P099)
Selangor constituency

Federal constituency
- Legislature: Dewan Rakyat
- MP: Rodziah Ismail; PH
- Constituency created: 2003
- First contested: 2004
- Last contested: 2022

Demographics
- Population (2020): 204,469
- Electors (2023): 135,101
- Area (km²): 51
- Pop. density (per km²): 4,009.2

Ampang is a federal constituency in Gombak District and Hulu Langat District, Selangor, Malaysia, that has been represented in the Dewan Rakyat since 2004.

The federal constituency was created in the 2003 redistribution and is mandated to return a single member to the Dewan Rakyat under the first past the post voting system.

== Demographics ==
雪兰莪国席 Selangor - 马来西亚第15届全国大选 | 中國報

Ethnic breakdown of Ampang's electorate as of 2022
1. Malay (51.6%)
2. Chinese (32.2%)
3. Indian (9.65%)
4. Other ethnicities (6.54%)
Age breakdown of Ampang's electorate as of 2022
1. 18-20 (6.34%)
2. 21-29 (21.1%)
3. 30-39 (21.4%)
4. 40-49 (17.3%)
5. 50-59 (15.2%)
6. 60-69 (11.8%)
7. 70-79 (5.21%)
8. 80-89 (1.47%)
9. above 90 (0.22%)
Gender breakdown of Ampang's electorate as of 2022
1. Male (49.3%)
2. Female (50.7%)

== History ==
=== Polling districts ===
According to the gazette issued on 18 July 2023, the Ampang constituency has a total of 37 polling districts.

State constituency	Polling districts	Code	Location
Bukit Antarabangsa (N19)	Taman Dato Ahmad Razali	099/19/01	Dewan Orang Ramai Taman Dato Ahmad Razali
Bukit Antarabangsa (N19)	Bukit Antarabangsa	099/19/02	SMK Lembah Keramat
Bukit Antarabangsa (N19)	Ukay Height	099/19/03	Mutiara International Grammar School Foundation Stage
Bukit Antarabangsa (N19)	Ampang Jaya	099/19/04	Dewan Majlis Perbandaran Ampang Jaya Jalan 1 Ampang Jaya
Bukit Antarabangsa (N19)	Taman Perwira	099/19/05	SMK Dato' Ahmad Razali
Bukit Antarabangsa (N19)	Kampung Baharu Ampang 1	099/19/06	SJK (C) On Pong Ampang Selangor
Bukit Antarabangsa (N19)	Kampung Melayu Ampang	099/19/07	SK Ampang
Bukit Antarabangsa (N19)	Pekan Ampang	099/19/08	SJK (T) Pekan Ampang
Bukit Antarabangsa (N19)	Kampung Baharu Ampang 2	099/19/09	SJK (C) On Pong Ampang Selangor
Bukit Antarabangsa (N19)	Kampung Sri Tanjung	099/19/10	Dewan Datuk Tahir Karim Kampung Melayu Ampang
Bukit Antarabangsa (N19)	Pinggiran Ukay	099/19/11	SMK Seri Keramat
Bukit Antarabangsa (N19)	Kuala Ampang	099/19/12	SK (1) Kuala Ampang
Bukit Antarabangsa (N19)	Ukay Perdana	099/19/13	Rumah Kelab Taman Kelab Ukay, Ukay Perdana
Bukit Antarabangsa (N19)	Kampung Baharu Ampang Kedua	099/19/14	Dewan Orang Ramai Ampang Mewah
Bukit Antarabangsa (N19)	Kampung Baharu Ampang Pertama	099/19/15	SJK (C) Kampung Baru Ampang
Bukit Antarabangsa (N19)	Bandar Baru Ampang	099/19/16	SMK Bandar Baru Ampang (Pintu A)
Bukit Antarabangsa (N19)	Kampung Baharu Ampang Ketiga	099/19/17	SK Taman Nirwana, Ampang (Pintu A)
Bukit Antarabangsa (N19)	Taman Dagang	099/19/18	SA Rakyat (KAFA Integrasi) Ar-Rahmaniah Taman Dagang
Bukit Antarabangsa (N19)	Taman Cahaya	099/19/19	SK Taman Nirwana, Ampang (Pintu A)
Lembah Jaya (N20)	Taman Tun Abdul Razak	099/20/01	Kelab Darul Ehsan Taman Tun Abdul Razak Ampang
Lembah Jaya (N20)	Lembah Jaya Utara	099/20/02	Dewan MPAJ Lembah Jaya
Lembah Jaya (N20)	Taman Kosas	099/20/03	SMK Taman Kosas
Lembah Jaya (N20)	Bukit Indah Jalan 1 & 2	099/20/04	SK Taman Bukit Indah
Lembah Jaya (N20)	Seri Watan	099/20/05	SMK Bandar Baru Ampang (Pintu B)
Lembah Jaya (N20)	Seri Ampang	099/20/06	Dewan Orang Ramai Taman Sri Ampang
Lembah Jaya (N20)	Bukit Ampang	099/20/07	KAFA Integrasi Taman Sri Watan
Lembah Jaya (N20)	Tasik Tambahan Utara	099/20/08	SK Taman Tasik
Lembah Jaya (N20)	Ampang Campuran Jalan Ikan Emas	099/20/09	SK Ampang Campuran
Lembah Jaya (N20)	Lembah Jaya Selatan	099/20/10	SK Lembah Jaya
Lembah Jaya (N20)	Kampung Tengah Lembah Jaya	099/20/11	SK Taman Kosas
Lembah Jaya (N20)	Taman Ampang Indah	099/20/12	SK Taman Kosas
Lembah Jaya (N20)	Taman Rasmi Jaya	099/20/13	SA Rakyat KAFA Integrasi Al-Huda Taman Rasmi Jaya
Lembah Jaya (N20)	Tasik Tambahan Selatan	099/20/14	SRA Tasik Tambahan
Lembah Jaya (N20)	Kampung Ampang Indah	099/20/15	SRA Lembah Jaya
Lembah Jaya (N20)	Taman Mulia Jaya	099/20/16	Dewan Komuniti Taman Mulia Jaya
Lembah Jaya (N20)	Ampang Campuran Jalan Ikan Jelawat	099/20/17	SK Ampang Campuran
Lembah Jaya (N20)	Bukit Indah Jalan 3	099/20/18	SMK Bukit Indah

=== Representation history ===
Members of Parliament for Ampang
Parliament	No	Years	Member	Party	Vote Share
Constituency created from Ampang Jaya
11th	P099	2004–2008	Rozaidah Talib (روزايده طالب)	BN (UMNO)	33,214; 71.13%
12th	P099	2008–2013	Zuraida Kamaruddin (زريدة قمرالدين)	PR (PKR)	26,995; 53.65%
13th	P099	2013–2015	Zuraida Kamaruddin (زريدة قمرالدين)	PR (PKR)	41,969; 59.40%
13th	P099	2015–2018	Zuraida Kamaruddin (زريدة قمرالدين)	PH (PKR)	41,969; 59.40%
14th	P099	2018–2020	Zuraida Kamaruddin (زريدة قمرالدين)	PH (PKR)	54,307; 70.94%
14th	P099	2020–2022	Zuraida Kamaruddin (زريدة قمرالدين)	PN (BERSATU)	54,307; 70.94%
14th	P099	2022	Zuraida Kamaruddin (زريدة قمرالدين)	PBM	54,307; 70.94%
15th	P099	2022–present	Rodziah Ismail (رضية إسماعيل)	PH (PKR)	56,754; 54.35%

=== State constituency ===
Parliamentary constituency	State constituency						
Parliamentary constituency	1955–59*	1959–1974	1974–1986	1986–1995	1995–2004	2004–2018	2018–present
Ampang						Bukit Antarabangsa	
Ampang						Lembah Jaya	

=== Historical boundaries ===
State Constituency	Area	
State Constituency	2003	2018
Bukit Antarabangsa	Ampang Hilir; Ampang Jaya; Bukit Antarabangsa; Taman Keramat; Ukay Heights	Ampang Jaya; Bukit Antarabangsa; Kampung Baharu Ampang; Kuala Ampang; Ukay Perdana
Lembah Jaya	Bukit Ampang; Kampung Baharu Ampang; Lembah Jaya; Taman Kosas; Tasek Permai	Bukit Ampang; Lembah Jaya; Seri Watan; Taman Kosas; Tasik Tambahan

=== Current state assembly members ===
No.	State Constituency	Member	Coalition (Party)
N19	Bukit Antarabangsa	Mohd Kamri Kamaruddin	PH (PKR)
N20	Lembah Jaya	Syed Ahmad Syed Abdul Rahman Alhadad	PH (PKR)

=== Local governments and postcodes ===
No.	State constituency	Local government	Postcodes
N19	Bukit Antarabangsa	Ampang Jaya Municipal Council	68000 Ampang
N20	Lembah Jaya	Ampang Jaya Municipal Council	68000 Ampang

== Election results ==
Malaysian general election, 2022
Party	Candidate	Votes	%	∆%
PH	Rodziah Ismail	56,754	54.35	▲54.35
PN	Sasha Lyna Abdul Latif	27,073	25.92	▲25.92
BN	Ivone Low Yi Wen	11,509	11.02	▼5.11
PBM	Zuraida Kamaruddin	4,589	4.39	▲4.39
PEJUANG	Nurul Ashikin Mabahwi	2,653	2.54	▲2.54
Heritage	Lai Wai Chong	1,423	1.36	▲1.36
Independent	Muhammad Syafiq Izwan Mohd Yunos	188	0.18	▲0.18
Independent	M Raven	148	0.14	▲0.14
Independent	Tan Hua Meng	93	0.09	▲0.09
Total valid votes		104,430	100.00	
Total rejected ballots		834		
Unreturned ballots		283		
Turnout		104,432	78.23	▼6.29
Registered electors		133,494		
Majority		29,681	28.43	▼26.38
PH hold		Swing		
Source(s) https://lom.agc.gov.my/ilims/upload/portal/akta/outputp/1753283/PUB612.pdf

Malaysian general election, 2018
Party	Candidate	Votes	%	∆%
PKR	Zuraida Kamaruddin	54,307	70.94	▲11.54
BN	Leong Kim Soon	12,351	16.13	▼24.47
PAS	Nurul Islam Mohamed Yusoff	9,598	12.54	▲12.54
Parti Rakyat Malaysia	Tan Hua Meng	294	0.38	▲0.38
Total valid votes		76,550	100.00	
Total rejected ballots		608		
Unreturned ballots		381		
Turnout		77,539	84.52	▼1.57
Registered electors		91,737		
Majority		41,956	54.81	▲36.01
PKR hold		Swing		
Source(s) "His Majesty's Government Gazette - Notice of Contested Election, Parliament for the State of Selangor [P.U. (B) 239/2018]" (PDF). Attorney General's Chambers of Malaysia. 3 May 2018. Archived from the original (PDF) on 19 July 2019. "Federal Government Gazette - Results of Contested Election and Statements of the Poll after the Official Addition of Votes, Parliamentary Constituencies for the State of Selangor [P.U. (B) 313/2018]" (PDF). Attorney General's Chambers of Malaysia. 28 May 2018. Archived from the original (PDF) on July 19, 2019.

Malaysian general election, 2013
Party	Candidate	Votes	%	∆%
PKR	Zuraida Kamaruddin	41,969	59.40	▲5.75
BN	Rozaidah Talib	28,691	40.60	▼5.75
Total valid votes		70,660	100.00	
Total rejected ballots		738		
Unreturned ballots		176		
Turnout		71,574	86.09	▲12.18
Registered electors		83,135		
Majority		13,278	18.80	▲11.50
PKR hold		Swing		
Source(s) "Federal Government Gazette - Notice of Contested Election, Parliament for the State of Selangor [P.U. (B) 176/2013]" (PDF). Attorney General's Chambers of Malaysia. 26 April 2013. Archived from the original (PDF) on September 30, 2018. "Federal Government Gazette - Results of Contested Election and Statements of the Poll after the Official Addition of Votes, Parliamentary Constituencies for the State of Selangor [P.U. (B) 217/2013]" (PDF). Attorney General's Chambers of Malaysia. 22 May 2013. Archived from the original (PDF) on September 30, 2018.

Malaysian general election, 2008
Party	Candidate	Votes	%	∆%
PKR	Zuraida Kamaruddin	26,995	53.65	▲24.78
BN	Azman Wahid	23,319	46.35	▼24.78
Total valid votes		50,314	100.00	
Total rejected ballots		636		
Unreturned ballots		147		
Turnout		51,097	73.91	▼2.65
Registered electors		69,132		
Majority		3,676	7.30	▼34.96
PKR gain from BN		Swing		?

Malaysian general election, 2004
Party	Candidate	Votes	%
BN	Rozaidah Talib	33,214	71.13
PKR	Xavier Jayakumar Arulanandam	13,482	28.87
Total valid votes		46,696	100.00
Total rejected ballots		710	
Unreturned ballots		73	
Turnout		47,479	71.26
Registered electors		66,627	
Majority		19,732	42.26
This was a new constituency created out of Ampang Jaya which went to BN in the previous election.
