= Universiti Teknologi MARA =

Malaysian public university

MARA University of Technology
- Universiti Teknologi MARA اونيۏرسيتي تيكنولوڬي مارا (Jawi)
- Emblem
- Former names: RIDA Training Centre (1956–1965); MARA College (1965–1967); MARA Institute of Technology (1967–1999)
- Motto: Usaha, Taqwa, Mulia (Malay)
- Motto in English: Endeavour, Religious, Dignified
- Type: Public
- Established: November 1956; 70 years ago
- Affiliations: Majlis Amanah Rakyat (1965-1999); Ministry of Higher Education (1999 - present)
- Budget: MYR 1.99 billion (2016)
- Chancellor: Ibrahim Ismail of Johor
- Vice-Chancellor: Yamin bin Yasin
- Pro-Chancellors: Tengku Permaisuri Norashikin; Zarinah Anwar; Abdul Wahab Aziz; Hassan Said
- Students: 175,910 (March 2024)
- Undergraduates: 1,055,977 (March 2024)
- Postgraduates: 10,483 (March 2024)
- Location: 40450 Shah Alam, Selangor Darul Ehsan, Malaysia, Shah Alam, Selangor, Malaysia; 3°04′10.9″N 101°30′13.2″E
- Campus: 34 branch campuses
- Colours: Vivid violet and Prussian blue
- Website: www.uitm.edu.my

The MARA University of Technology or informally the MARA Technological University (Malay: Universiti Teknologi MARA, abbr. UiTM) is a Malaysian public university based primarily in Shah Alam, Selangor. It was established to help rural Malays in 1956 as the Rural & Industrial Development Authority (RIDA) Training Centre (Malay: Dewan Latihan RIDA), and opened with around 50 students. It has since grown into the largest institution of higher education in Malaysia as measured by physical infrastructure, faculty and staff, and student enrollment. Since becoming a public university despite its name, UiTM is no longer affiliated with Majlis Amanah Rakyat, although it continues to only accept bumiputera students.

The university comprises one main campus and 34 satellite campuses. It offers over 500 programmes taught in English that range from undergraduate to the postgraduate level. The school is home to some 170,514 full-time and part-time bumiputera and international students. UiTM is one of the only two public universities in Malaysia to have English as the official language of instruction and administration, the other being International Islamic University Malaysia (IIUM).

In 2019, UiTM proposed its corporate name change to Arshad Ayub University (Malay: Universiti Tun Arshad Ayub) to honour the country's education icon and its founding father, Arshad Ayub, which subject to regulatory approval. The proposed name is still pending for approval from the Ministry of Education. Another proposed name is Universiti DiRaja Malaysia (English: Royal University of Malaysia) as UiTM is technically a de-facto Royal University due to by law (Act 173) Yang Di-Pertuan Agong is the only person who shall be appointed as Chancellor plus UiTM Convocation Ceremony used the Royal Protocol approved by Istana Negara with a Nobat-like Ensemble used for the parade of Chancellor, Pro-Chancellor, Vice-Chancellor or their representative.

== History ==
=== Founding ===
Universiti Teknologi MARA (UiTM) began as the RIDA (Rural & Industrial Development Authority) Training Centre (Malay: Dewan Latehan RIDA), and was inspired by Onn Jaafar, the founder and former president of United Malays National Organisation (UMNO). The idea was conceived as a result of his study visit to Ceylon (now Sri Lanka) in 1951 to look into its rural development programme. A paper outlined the establishment of RIDA and its objectives of rebuilding rural society, as well as improving the economy of rural Malays. A bill, Paper No. 10/1951, was passed by the Federal Legislative Council in the same year that led to its establishment. Section 5 of the bill outlines the justification and the necessity of establishing RIDA. The word kampong (lit. 'village'), which is synonymous with the Malays, is also used in Section 8.

=== Training centre ===
The RIDA Training Centre began operations in Petaling Jaya, Selangor (currently Jalan Othman satellite campus) under its first principal, Syed Alwi Syed Sheikh Alhadi in November 1956. It was officially opened by Ismail Abdul Rahman, the Minister for Trade and Industry on 14 February 1957. The training centre conducted pre-university courses, business skills training, and several external professional courses offered by established international bodies, such as the London Chamber of Commerce, the Australian Chartered Secretaryship, the Australian Society of Accountants, and the British Institute of Management. After the Federation of Malaysia was created in 1963, the training centre began to admit native students from Sabah and Sarawak, and more academic programmes were offered. In 1964, the RIDA Training Centre held its first convocation and 50 graduates were awarded certificates by Tun Abdul Razak, the Deputy Prime Minister of Malaysia.

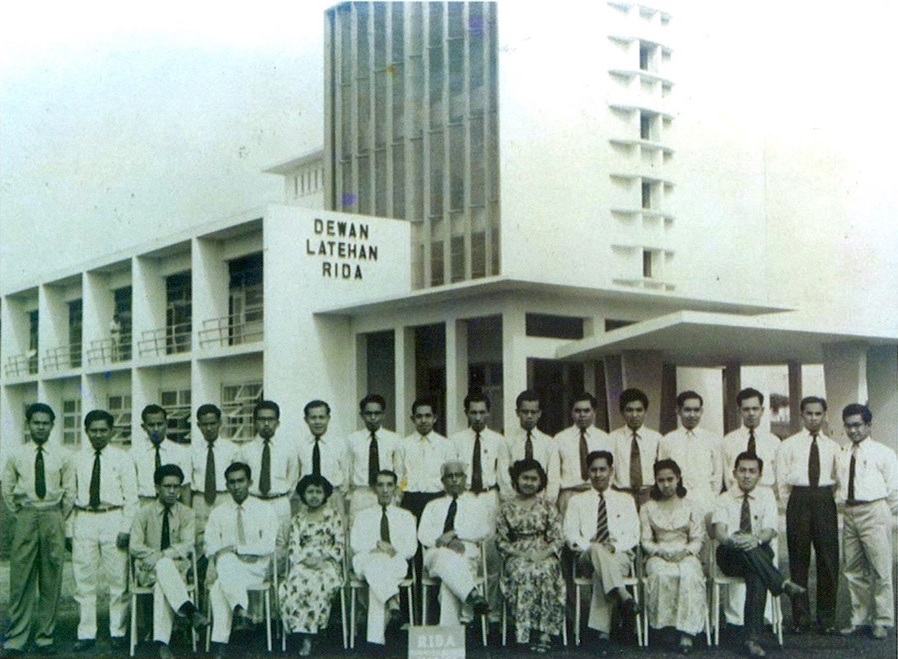
The first batch of Dewan Latehan Rida students in Jalan Othman campus circa 1956.

The training centre later became known as MARA College (Malay: Maktab MARA) in 1965. The name change meant that the college no longer operated under RIDA and instead became the most important unit of the MARA Training Division. MARA stands for Majlis Amanah Rakyat (transl. Council of Trust for the Indigenous People), which was founded under the leadership of Tan Sri Arshad Ayub, took over and strengthened the role and responsibilities of RIDA. When the British Institute of Management ceased conducting external examinations in 1966, MARA College began running its own Diploma in Business Studies. International recognition for the course came from Ealing Technical College in London, which also became its external examiner.

The logo of MARA Institute Of Technology (Malay: Institut Teknologi MARA, ITM) from 1967 until 1999.

=== Expansion and growth ===
In 1967, the college was upgraded to Institut Teknologi MARA (ITM). It was established in response to a need in Malaysia for trained professionals, especially among bumiputera. This shortage was identified through a manpower survey conducted by the government in collaboration with the United Nations in 1965. Acknowledging the fact that education holds the key to positive social engineering processes, ITM made education easily accessible primarily to the bumiputera Malays and indigenous bumiputera of the Malay peninsula (such as Jakun, Senoi) and East Malaysia (such as the Kadazan-Dusun, Melanau, and Dayak). It mainly catered to semi-professional courses predominantly in the science and technology in fields such as engineering, applied sciences and architecture, building, and planning. However, realising the importance of other complementary nation-building fields, it also included a repertoire of other salient "management and humanities-based" fields such as business studies, hotel and catering management, mass communications, public administration, law, secretarial science, and art and design. By 1973, branch campuses had been set up in Perlis, Sabah, and Sarawak. The development of ITM occurred in three stages: the first phase (1967–1976) came with the declaration of the institute as an autonomous body with its own 300 acres (120 ha) campus in Shah Alam, and was placed under the Ministry of Rural Development; and the second phase (1976–1996) involved ITM rapidly harnessing its potential as an institution of higher learning, which led to the ITM Act of 1976 that placed the institute directly under the Ministry of Education's jurisdiction.

In 1992, ITM applied to open a radio station for its communication students but was rejected. However, the students were allowed to do practical training at RTM.

=== University status ===
The third phase (1996–1999) occurred as a result of an amendment to the ITM Act of 1976, which granted the institution all the powers of a university on par with all the universities in the country, despite retaining its name. Among the significant changes was a creation of board of directors and Senate. Many principal officers of ITM were re-designated, such as the Branch Director being renamed Rector, the Head of Campus became Provost, and Principal and Senior Lecturers were re-designated as professors and Malay Associate Professors respectively. Each School was redesignated as a Faculty. ITM was also given the power to confer degrees up to Doctor of Philosophy level, the unique power to establish courses and campuses abroad with permission from the Minister of Education, and to conduct business, invest in shares, set up companies and engage in commercial research. Disciplinary powers over staff were transferred from the Minister to the board of directors. To improve staff accountability, the institute was allowed to impose a surcharge, and the procedural rights of students in disciplinary proceedings were strengthened.

In August 1999, Prime Minister Mahathir Mohamad announced the change in name of ITM to Universiti Teknologi MARA (UiTM). With such acknowledgement from the government, the institution was heavily restructured to consolidate the university's resources for optimum productivity. Universiti Teknologi MARA Act 173 was drafted in conjunction with the establishment of UiTM. It is deemed essential as the Act provides guidelines for maintenance, smooth administration, and other pertinent matters. The Act also serves as an acknowledgement of the institution's transition from an institute to a university, and the authority bestowed upon it to function like any other university, including the offering of courses and the conferment of degrees at all levels.

In 2015, the university was granted autonomy status.

== Campuses and the university system ==
UiTM is Malaysia's largest institution of higher learning in terms of size and population and the largest university system in the country. Besides the main campus in Shah Alam, the university has expanded nationwide with 34 branch campuses, which collectively offers more than 500 academic programmes. UiTM established a system called 1 University Multi System (1UiTM), which designates an anchor university and 13 branch campuses. To qualify as a university system, accredited certification of the quality management systems for each UiTM campus must be done separately, which means that any certification granted to the flagship campus does not extend to the state campuses, and each state campus has to apply for its own certification.

=== Flagship campus ===
UiTM is headed by a Vice-Chancellor. The system's flagship campus is situated in a designated area known formerly as Section 1 in Shah Alam. This campus houses the Chancellery and Registrar's Office and assumes the role of the administrative centre. The flagship campus (and its satellite campuses) only offer programmes in foundation, degree, and post-graduate levels. The anchor university consists of the main campus in Shah Alam and the Selangor Branch Campus (Puncak Alam, Selayang, Sungai Buloh, Puncak Perdana, Jalan Othman and Dengkil).

=== Satellite campuses ===
Satellite campuses relieve the flagship campus by accepting student overflow, which involves moving out some faculties from the flagship campus. Each satellite campus is led by an Assistant Vice-Chancellor or head of study centre.

=== State campuses (branch campuses) ===
Branch campuses are headed by Rectors, who are directly accountable to the Vice-Chancellor. UiTM has campuses in every state in Malaysia, except the Federal Territories. Each state may contain more than one campus. The flagship state campuses are led by the Rector and smaller campuses (called city campuses) are led by Assistant Rectors.

State campuses mainly offer pre-diploma and diploma-level programmes in themes or niches set by the flagship campus. Some degree and post-graduate programmes are also offered through a franchise agreement with the flagship campus.

==== Autonomous campuses ====
As of June 2014, there are seven branch campuses which have been granted autonomous status—the Perlis, Perak, Terengganu, Sarawak, Malacca, Penang, and Pahang campuses. This is in line with the vision that all state campuses will eventually be given autonomous administration, giving each campus its own degree of creativity and to increase achievements in various aspects of the campus and its students. A significant feature of these autonomous campuses is the ability to hold their own convocation ceremonies and most executive decisions would not depend on the administration of the flagship campus.

Location of UiTM campuses in Selangor
Location of UiTM campuses in other states

List of UiTM campuses around Malaysia
Number	Campus	Location	Established	Notes
Main Campus
1	Shah Alam	Seksyen 1, Shah Alam	1967	Locates most of main administration bodies and major research centre of the university.
	Tun Arshad Ayub	Jalan Othman, Petaling Jaya	1957	Original main campus of the institute before Shah Alam campus was established and was named "Jalan Othman", then turned into satellite campus for the new main campus. Currently serves as postgraduate centre for Arts and Design faculty. Renamed to the current "Tun Arshad Ayub" in 2026 to honour his services and contributions.
UiTM Selangor Branch
2	Puncak Alam	Puncak Alam, Kuala Selangor	2009	Main Selangor branch campus. Locates Hospital Al-Sultan Abdullah, the university hospital.
3	Puncak Perdana	Seksyen U10, Shah Alam	2004	Small campus that locates Film, Animation and Theatre and Information Management faculties
4	Dengkil	Dengkil, Sepang	2015	Small campus that locates Centre of Foundation Studies which hosts foundation programmes of the university
5	Selayang	Batu Caves	2003	Hosts medicine and dentistry programmes
6	Sungai Buloh	Sungai Buloh	2012	Main campus for medicine and dentistry faculties, locates specialist centres of the university hospital.
UiTM Perak Branch (Autonomous)
7	Seri Iskandar	Seri Iskandar	1985	Main Perak branch campus. Locates major branch administration as well as Art and Design and Build Environment programmes
8	Tapah	Tapah Road, Tapah	2010	Focuses on science and accountancy programmes
9	Ipoh	Ipoh		City campus, focuses on part-time programmes.
10c	Teluk Intan	Teluk Intan	2010	Community research centre under Faculty of Medicine
UiTM Malacca Branch (Autonomous)
11	Alor Gajah	Lendu, Alor Gajah	1984	Main Melaka branch campus
12	Malacca City	Malacca City	2006	City campus, hosts Business and Management programmes
13	Jasin	Merlimau	2014	Hosts Computer Science and Agrotechnology programmes
UiTM Negeri Sembilan Branch
14	Kuala Pilah	Kuala Pilah	1999	Main Negeri Sembilan branch campus. Hosts applied science programmes.
15	Seremban	Seremban	2014	Hosts Computer Science and Sport Science programmes
16	Rembau	Rembau	2017	Hosts Mass Communication and Business programmes
UiTM Johor Branch
17	Segamat	Segamat	1983	Main Johor branch campus
18	Pasir Gudang	Masai	2014	Hosts Engineering programmes
UiTM Pahang Branch (Autonomous)
19	Jengka	Bandar Tun Razak	1993	Main Pahang branch campus.
20	Raub	Raub	2015	
UiTM Terengganu Branch (Autonomous)
22	Dungun	Sura Hujung, Dungun	1975	Main Terengganu branch campus
23	Kuala Terengganu	Chendering, Kuala Terengganu	2008	Hosts Computer Science programmes
24	Bukit Besi	Bukit Besi	2013	Hosts Engineering programmes
UiTM Kelantan Branch
25	Machang	Machang	1985	Main Kelantan Branch campus
26	Kota Bharu	Kota Bharu	2006	City campus, hosts Business programmes
UiTM Penang Branch (Autonomous)
27	Permatang Pauh	Permatang Pauh	1996	Main Penang Branch campus.
28	Bertam	Kepala Batas	2011	Hosts Health Science programmes
UiTM Perlis Branch (Autonomous)
29	Arau	Arau	1974	Main and sole branch campus of the state.
UiTM Kedah Branch
30	Sungai Petani	Merbok	1997	Main and sole branch campus of the state.
UiTM Sarawak Branch (Autonomous)
31	Samarahan	Kota Samarahan	1973	Main Sarawak Branch campus
31	Samarahan 2	Kota Samarahan	2013	
32	Mukah	Mukah	2002	Host Business, Banking and Plantation programmes
UiTM Sabah Branch
33	Kota Kinabalu	Kuala Menggatal	1973	Main Sabah Branch campus
34	Tawau	Tawau	1996	Hosts Pre-Diploma programmes

==== Former campus sites ====
Number	Branch	Location	Notes
1	Main Campus	Kolej Beringin, Jalan Klang Lama, Kuala Lumpur	Additional hostel site for Jalan Othman campus.
2	Perak	Bandar Baru Seri Manjung	Initial site of the branch campus before moving to Seri Iskandar in 1998.
3	Pahang	Bukit Sekilau, Kuantan	Initial sites of Pahang branch campus, before gradually moved to Jengka and Raub. The last of the old site continues to operate as city campus until 2015.
3	Pahang	Telok Sisek, Kuantan	Initial sites of Pahang branch campus, before gradually moved to Jengka and Raub. The last of the old site continues to operate as city campus until 2015.
3	Pahang	Padang Lalang, Kuantan	Initial sites of Pahang branch campus, before gradually moved to Jengka and Raub. The last of the old site continues to operate as city campus until 2015.
4	Sarawak	Samariang	Initial sites of Sarawak Branch campus before moving to Kota Samarahan.
4	Sarawak	Batu Lintang	Initial sites of Sarawak Branch campus before moving to Kota Samarahan.
4	Sarawak	Semenggok	Initial sites of Sarawak Branch campus before moving to Kota Samarahan.
5	Sabah	Sembulan, Kota Kinabalu	Initital site of Sabah Branch campus before moving to the current site in Kuala Menggatal.
6	Negeri Sembilan	Jalan Melang, Kuala Pilah	Old site of Kuala Pilah campus before moving to the permanent site in Beting. Still in use as additional hostel site of the Kuala Pilah campus.
7	Johor	Bukit Siput, Segamat	Initial site of Johor branch, before moving to the current site at Batu 8.
8	Perlis	Padang Katong, Kangar	Initial site of Perlis branch before moving to the permanent campus in Arau.
9	Terengganu	Sura Gate, Dungun	Initial site of Terengganu branch before moving to current site at Sura Hujung in 1978. Continues to operate as a research center before returned to the state government in 1998.
10	Melaka	Bachang	Was the original sites of Melaka Branch during its initial years, before moving to Lendu in 1984. Not to be confused with the newer Kampus Bandaraya Melaka (also in Jalan Hang Tuah) which was established later.
10	Melaka	Jalan Hang Tuah	Was the original sites of Melaka Branch during its initial years, before moving to Lendu in 1984. Not to be confused with the newer Kampus Bandaraya Melaka (also in Jalan Hang Tuah) which was established later.
11	Kelantan	Kem Kijang, Kota Bharu	Initial sites of Kelantan branch campus, before moving to permanent site in Machang in 1996.
11	Kelantan	Tanjung Chat, Kota Bharu	Initial sites of Kelantan branch campus, before moving to permanent site in Machang in 1996.

=== Shah Alam Main Campus ===
==== Libraries ====
The founding of UiTM Library began with the establishment of the RIDA Training Centre at Jalan Othman, Petaling Jaya, in 1956. It was initially known as RIDA Library, and was stocked with reading materials for accounting, bookkeeping, and London Chamber of Commerce (LCC) examination preparatory courses. Library administration operated in a room on the first floor of the old Administrative Department building at the RIDA Training Centre. The library was later moved to the ground floor of the Administrative Department annex to accommodate the increase of users and collections. In 1965, its name changed to MARA College Library in conjunction with the institution's name change, and it was administered by a certified officer in librarianship. The library collections at the time consisted only of books, journals, magazines, newspapers, and other foreign publications in English. On 14 October 1967, MARA College was renamed MARA Institute of Technology (ITM). In a short period of time, the Jalan Othman campus could no longer accommodate the number of new professional courses that indirectly caused an increase in the number of students. In 1972, the ITM main campus was built in Shah Alam. A four-storey building was specially designated as the ITM library, and was designed based on discussion with the Chief Librarian, in accordance to specifications for an academic library.

The library was officiated by the second Prime Minister of Malaysia, Abdul Razak, on 29 July 1972, and it was named Tun Abdul Razak Library (Perpustakaan Tun Abdul Razak - PTAR) in his honour. On 26 August 1999, the fourth Prime Minister of Malaysia, Mahathir Mohamad, announced that ITM had been upgraded to Universiti Teknologi MARA (UiTM), and the new status transformed UiTM Library from a traditional library into a hybrid library in line with the development of current technology. The library internal processes are now automated, and UiTM Library services can be accessed online anytime. It functions as the primary source of online reference for users at all times.

==== Residential colleges ====
There are 13 residential colleges which provide accommodation to students in the main campus. These colleges differ from one another in terms of room capacity, where some colleges accommodate two students per room while some can accommodate up to eight students per room. Residential colleges are not autonomous as they fall under the jurisdiction of UiTM, but the director of each college has some autonomy in governing these colleges.

The colleges are segregated by gender where different colleges cater only to either male or female students, except Kolej Teratai, where male and female students live in different blocks. Rental for residential colleges in Shah Alam campus is only free for first year students; a minimum fee is charged for second year students and above.

As the main campus receives an increase in student enrolment each year, there are constraints on the residential college facilities. Many students in UiTM Shah Alam have to rent off-campus residential facilities on their own. To ensure the welfare and safety of the non-resident students who stay off-campus, the college management established a Non-Resident Management Unit to manage living environment matters for these students, which includes helping non-resident students search for accommodation within Shah Alam.

== Academics ==
The university is made up of a number of faculties and academies. It is categorised into three main clusters: business and management, social sciences and humanities, and science and technology. The Academic Affairs Division, headed by a Deputy Vice-Chancellor, is responsible to ensure the soundness of the academic programs as well as the robust, uniform, and standardised academic delivery throughout the whole UiTM system across the nation.

The Senate is the highest authority in UiTM for all academic matters. It is chaired by the Vice-Chancellor and the membership comprises all Deans of faculties and academic centres, representatives from the Rectors of campuses, senior members of the academic staff, and a registrar. The Senate are responsible to create curriculum and academic programs; to set the standard of teaching, learning and training conducted at the UiTM; to determine the entry qualifications into any academic programs offered; and to endorse the results of student assessments and awards of all academic degrees at doctoral, master, bachelor, diploma and certificate levels.

As of May 2015, 470 programmes offered by UiTM include degrees at doctoral, master, bachelor, diploma, and certificate levels. There are 286 programmes based on science and technology while another 184 programmes are non-science and technology. In addition, 94 professional programmes (local and international) are offered by UiTM, including programmes certified by University of London International Programmes, the Association of Chartered Certified Accountants (ACCA), the Institute of Chartered Secretaries and Administrators (ICSA), the Chartered Institute of Transport (CIT), the Institute of Electrical & Electronics Engineers (IEEE), the Institute of Electrical Engineers (IEE), the Chartered Institute of Building (CIOB), London College of Printing, and the Institute and Faculty of Actuaries of the United Kingdom.

In 1973, UiTM (then ITM) established ITM-Off Campus to provide opportunities for working adults to further and obtain a quality tertiary education. Classes are held after office hours on weekdays and on weekends, and courses are patterned after the full-time mainstream programs. The success of external program propelled UiTM toward embarking upon the distance mode. The Institute of Neo Education (iNED) which later renamed to Institute of Continuing Education & Professional Studies (ICEPS) in 2019 was formed in 2012 offering several diploma and degree courses on distance and out-campus mode.

=== Research ===
In 2011, UiTM's research publication was ranked 5th nationwide by Web of Science. Scopus reported, a total of 6,863 papers has been published in academic journals by UiTM faculties from 2009 until 2013. It was cited in 7,479 papers with 32.7% of it was self-cited by UiTM's researchers.

The Institute of Research Management & Innovation (IRMI) is the research arm of the university. It was created to manage research, consultancy, intellectual property protection, commercialisation, and initiate new research and innovation activities. IRMI conducts seminars, workshops and roadshows to encourage and train the academics and non-academic staff on research and consultancy, securing research grants and projects, managing their finances, and publishing research work. It also handles the university's Research Ethics Committee. IRMI also organises expositions of innovations and research to encourage innovations and inventions within the university's environment.

UiTM's main campus in Shah Alam and its satellite campuses in the Klang Valley have been focusing on research excellence and postgraduate training since 2009 in response to the 10th Malaysia Plan, which include the Research and Development (R&D) Roadmap Action Plan. The UiTM R&D Roadmap specifically emphasised increasing the number of principal investigators and students to publish in Web of Science and Scopus journals. Research funding in UiTM has been steadily increasing from just over RM14 million in 2006 to RM50.4 million in 2011. Social science and humanities research comprised 20% of the secured funding.

To steer Malaysia towards becoming an innovation-based and knowledge-based economy, the Ministry of Higher Education (MOHE) recognised six research institutions as Higher Institutions Centre of Excellence (HICoE) in 2009, including UiTM's Accounting Research Institute (ARI) for its research niche area in Islamic Finance Criminology. In 2014, UiTM's Malaysian Institute of Transport (MITRANS) was conferred as HICoE for the niche area of Halalan Toyyibban Supply Chain. Six UiTM's research institutions has been granted Centre of Excellence (CoE) status: the Institute of Science (IOS); the Institute of Infrastructure and Environmental Services and Management (IIESM); the Institute of Pathology, Medical and Forensic Laboratory (I-PPerForm); the Atta-Ur-Rahman Institute for Natural Product Discovery (AuRIns); the Integrative Pharmacogenomic Centre (iPROMISE); and the Institute of Business Excellence (IBE).

UiTM collaborated with Plantations International in 2022 to be its sapling research and development arm in Malaysia.

=== Reputation ===
QS World University Rankings
Year	World	Asia	Malaysia	Ref
2012	601+	238	9	
2013	601+	201–250	7	
2014	701+	168	7	
2015	651–700	201–250	7	
2016	701+	201–250	7	
2017	701+	181	8	
2018	751–800	158	9	
2019	751–800	137	12	
2020	651–700	119	12	

2019 QS World University Rankings by Subject
Subject	Score	World	Malaysia
Accounting & Finance	-	251–300	5
Engineering & Technology	68.4	290	7
Social Sciences & Management	62.3	324	6
Business & Management Studies	-	301–350	6
Material Sciences	-	301–350	6
Engineering – Mechanical, Aeronautical & Manufacturing	–	301–350	8
Arts & Humanities	60.2	383	5
Engineering – Electrical & Electronic	–	351–400	7
Economics and Econometrics	–	351–400	6

As one of the leading universities in Malaysia, UiTM has been rated positively by local and international bodies. In 2010, UiTM was rated "Tier 5: Excellent" in the 2009 Malaysian Qualifications Agency (MQA) Rating System for Higher Education Institutions in Malaysia (SETARA '09). UiTM maintained its rating of "Tier 5: Excellent" in the 2011 Malaysian Qualifications Agency (MQA) Rating System for Higher Education Institutions in Malaysia (SETARA '11). In the same year, UiTM was rated 2 stars in the 2011 Malaysian Research Assessment Instrument (MyRA) where universities are given "star ratings" for their research, development and commercialisation efforts. In 2013, UiTM was awarded by Ministry of Higher Education as Entrepreneurial University of the Year.

In global rankings, UiTM best performance was in 2014 when it positioned as the 168th best university in Asia, despite maintaining its seventh position locally. In 2016, five subjects were ranked in QS World University Ranking by Subject, an increase of two subjects from the 2015 ranking.

=== International partners ===
The university holds a number of formal links with institutions from around the world to share teaching and research and facilitate staff and student exchanges. As of June 2019, a total of 25 universities, 9 embassies, and 2 others have been identified as global partners.

=== Controversies ===
The University, which is publicly funded, only admits bumiputera students and excludes citizens of other races. Recent protests in May 2024 broke out to oppose the admission of non-bumiputera students. Critics cite the bumiputera-only policies as a form of institutional racism.

== Alumni ==
UiTM graduates have found success in a wide variety of fields, and have served at the heads of diverse institutions both in the public and private sector. As of November 2014, more than 600,000 alumni have graduated from UiTM over the course of its history. A dedicated UiTM Office of Alumni Relations was established in 2000 which to maintain and update a database of alumni in collaboration with faculties and campuses. Fraternity among alumnus was further uphold with the establishment of UiTM Budiman Foundation which helps the needy students and give financial support to current student who further studies in postgrad level.

Some of the notable alumni include the following:

- Siti Aishah: 11th Raja Permaisuri Agong (Queen) of Malaysia.
- Richard Malanjum: Chief Judge at the High Courts of Sabah and Sarawak and former Judge at the Court of Appeal and Federal Court.
- Musa Aman: Politician, 14th Chief Minister of Sabah.
- Nancy Shukri: Politician, Minister in the Prime Minister's Department.
- Azalina Othman Said: Politician, Minister in the Prime Minister's Department and former Minister of Youth and Sports.
- Zaid Ibrahim: Politician, former Minister in the Prime Minister's Department in charge of legal affairs.
- Rina Harun: Politician, Women's Chief of the Malaysian United Indigenous Party.
- Afif Bahardin: Politician, Deputy Chief of Parti Keadilan Rakyat Permatang Pauh; Penang State Executive Councillor for agriculture, agro-based industries, rural development and health.
- Aminuddin Harun: Politician, as the eleventh Menteri Besar of Negeri Sembilan
- Mohd Zin Mohamed: Politician, former Minister of Works.
- Azimi Daim: Politician, member of Malaysian United Indigenous Party
- Dyana Sofya Mohd Daud: Politician, lawyer and columnist.
- Tengku Adnan: Politician
- Baru Bian: Politician
- Rahmat Mohamad: 5th Sectary-General of Asian-African Legal Consultative Organization (AALCO).
- Yuliandre Darwis: Communication Expert (Indonesia), served as Chair of the Indonesian Broadcasting Commission for the period 2016–2019.
- Kamarudin Meranun: Co-founder and Executive Chairman of AirAsia.
- Ahmad Badri Mohd Zahir: Secretary-General of the Treasury of Malaysia, Chairman of the Inland Revenue Board of Malaysia (LHDN), Retirement Fund (Incorporated) (KWAP) and the Public Sector Home Financing Board (LPPSA).
- Yuna: Malaysian singer-songwriter and businesswoman.
- Faizal Tahir: Malaysian singer-songwriter.
- Francisca James: Indigenous Malaysian model and beauty pageant titleholder, Miss Universe Malaysia 2020.
- Hanis Zalikha: Blogger, model and actress.
- Mira Filzah: Actress
- Fattah Amin: Actor and singer
- Ahirudin Attan: Blogger, journalist and former editor
- Fikry Ibrahim: Actor, comedian, TV Host and model
- Ben Amir : Actor and model
- Aishah Sinclair: Actress, TV host, radio announcer, and spokesperson for Yayasan Anak Warisan Alam (YAWA)
- Mohd Anuar Mohd Tahir: Incumbent Deputy Minister of Works for the Malaysian government
- Noryn Aziz: Singer
- Syamsul Amri Ismail: Preacher
- Shahrulazwad Ismail: Author of "Music and Film Copyright in Malaysia"
- Ezly Syazwan: Malaysian singer-songwriter, composer and lyricist

== See also ==
- UiTM United
- Social_contract_(Malaysia)
