= Mohamed Salleh Bajuri =

Malaysian politician

Yang Berbahagia Datuk Mohamed Salleh Bajuri PJN DPTJ

1st Treasurer-General of the Malaysian United Indigenous Party
- In office 2016 – 29 November 2024
- President: Muhyiddin Yassin
- Chairman: Mahathir Mohamad (2016–2020); Muhyiddin Yassin (February–August 2020)
- Succeeded by: Rina Harun

Personal details
- Party: Malaysian United Indigenous Party (BERSATU) (since 2016)
- Other political affiliations: Pakatan Harapan (PH) (2017–2020); Perikatan Nasional (PN) (since 2020)

Mohamed Salleh bin Bajuri is a Malaysian politician. He is a member of the Malaysian United Indigenous Party (BERSATU), a component party of the Perikatan Nasional (PN) and formerly the Pakatan Harapan (PH) coalitions. He served as the Treasurer-General of BERSATU from 2016 to November 2024.

== Controversies and issues ==
Mohamed Salleh Bajuri was remanded by the Malaysian Anti-Corruption Commission for allegations concerning party accounts. He was released on bail on 4 March 2023.

== Honours ==
- Malaysia :
  - Commander of the Order of Meritorious Service (PJN) – Datuk (2020)
- Negeri Sembilan :
  - Knight Commander of the Grand Order of Tuanku Jaafar (DPTJ) – Dato' (1997)
