= Aiman Athirah Sabu =

Malaysian politician

Yang Berhormat Datuk Aiman Athirah Sabu PGDK MP
- أيمن عطيرة سابو

Deputy Minister of Housing and Local Government
- Incumbent
- Assumed office 12 December 2023
- Monarchs: Abdullah (2023–2024); Ibrahim Iskandar (since 2024)
- Prime Minister: Anwar Ibrahim
- Minister: Nga Kor Ming
- Preceded by: Akmal Nasrullah Mohd Nasir (Deputy Minister of Local Government Development)
- Constituency: Sepang

Deputy Minister of Women, Family and Community Development
- In office 10 December 2022 – 12 December 2023
- Monarch: Abdullah
- Prime Minister: Anwar Ibrahim
- Minister: Nancy Shukri
- Preceded by: Siti Zailah Mohd Yusoff
- Succeeded by: Noraini Ahmad
- Constituency: Sepang
- Chairman: Anwar Ibrahim

Member of the Malaysian Parliament for Sepang
- Incumbent
- Assumed office 19 November 2022
- Preceded by: Mohamed Hanipa Maidin (PH–AMANAH)
- Majority: 8,949 (2022)

Senator Appointed by the Yang di-Pertuan Agong
- In office 27 August 2018 – 26 August 2021
- Monarchs: Muhammad V (2018–2019); Abdullah (2019–2021)
- Prime Minister: Mahathir Mohamad (2018–2020); Muhyiddin Yassin (2020–2021); Ismail Sabri Yaakob (2021)

3rd Women Chief of Pakatan Harapan
- Incumbent
- Assumed office 12 September 2021
- President: Wan Azizah Wan Ismail
- Deputy: Fadhlina Sidek; Chong Eng (2021–2024); Juliana Janni (2021–2024); Teo Nie Ching (since 2024); Mohina Sidom (since 2024)
- Preceded by: Chong Eng

2nd Women Chief of the National Trust Party
- Incumbent
- Assumed office 1 December 2019
- President: Mohamad Sabu
- Deputy: Nor Hayati Bachok (2019–2023); Anfaal Saari (since 2023)
- Preceded by: Siti Mariah Mahmud

Personal details
- Born: Raj Munni Sabu; 23 September 1972 (age 53) Sandakan, Sabah, Malaysia
- Party: Malaysian Islamic Party (PAS) (until 2015); National Trust Party (AMANAH) (since 2015)
- Other political affiliations: Barisan Alternatif (BA) (until 2004); Pakatan Rakyat (PR) (2008–2015); Pakatan Harapan (PH) (since 2015)
- Education: Universiti Sains Malaysia
- Occupation: Politician

Raj Munni binti Sabu more commonly known as Aiman Athirah Al Jundi is a Malaysian politician who has served as the Deputy Minister of Housing and Local Government in the Unity Government administration under Prime Minister Anwar Ibrahim and Minister Nga Kor Ming since December 2023 and the Member of Parliament (MP) for Sepang since November 2022. She served as Deputy Minister of Women, Family and Community Development prior to the 2023 cabinet reshuffle under Minister Nancy Shukri from December 2022 to December 2023 and served as a Senator from August 2018 to August 2021. She is a member of the National Trust Party (AMANAH), a component party of Pakatan Harapan (PH) coalition and has served as the 2nd Women Chief since December 2019. She has also served as the 3rd Women Chief of PH since September 2021.

== Education ==
Athirah is a graduate of Universiti Sains Malaysia, where she earned a bachelor's degree in Social Science with a major in political science and a minor in Islamic Studies.

== Political career ==
Prior to joining Amanah, Aiman Athirah was a member of the PAS political party. She began her political career by joining PAS, but left the party after the defeat of PAS Deputy President Mohamad Sabu in a party election. She then joined Amanah, a new party founded by Mohamad Sabu.

Aiman Athirah has held several positions within her party, including PAS Women Head of Information and PAS Women Acting Director of Elections. She has also been a member of the Supreme Committee of the Central Pakatan Rakyat Women's Council.

In addition to her political career, Aiman Athirah has been involved with various community and non-governmental organizations (NGOs). She has worked with the Oppressed People's Network (JERIT) to fight for issues of interest to the working class, and with EMPOWER to promote women's empowerment programs. She has also been involved with BERSIH, a coalition of NGOs demanding clean elections, and has been an activist for the People's Awakening in the Coalition of PROTES and the Movement to Abolish the Internal Security Act (ISA).

Aiman Athirah has also been involved in efforts to protest the rising prices of goods and the privatisation of health and medical services. She has been an activist for the anti-war movement and a member of the Secretariat Committee of the Anti Tail Suit and Anti AES Campaign.

In the 15th General Election (GE15), Aiman Athirah contested the Sepang parliamentary seat and won with a majority of 8,949 votes.

She retained her post as AMANAH Wanita Chief in her party's election on 22 December 2023.

== Election results ==
Parliament of Malaysia
Year	Constituency	Candidate	Votes	Pct	Opponent(s)	Votes	Pct	Ballots cast	Majority	Turnout
2004	P184 Libaran	Raj Munni Sabu (PKR)	2,471	15.83%	Juslie Ajirol (UMNO)	13,140	84.17%	15,611	10,699	61.31%
2013	P126 Jelebu	Raj Munni Sabu (PAS)	15,013	40.44%	Zainudin Ismail (UMNO)	22,114	59.56%	37,127	7,101	84.61%
2022	P113 Sepang	Raj Munni Sabu (AMANAH)	56,264	40.78%	Rina Harun (BERSATU)	47,315	34.30%	137,955	8,949	83.10%
2022	P113 Sepang	Raj Munni Sabu (AMANAH)	56,264	40.78%	Anuar Basiran (UMNO)	31,097	22.54%	137,955	8,949	83.10%
2022	P113 Sepang	Raj Munni Sabu (AMANAH)	56,264	40.78%	Che Asmah Ibrahim (PEJUANG)	2,237	1.69%	137,955	8,949	83.10%
2022	P113 Sepang	Raj Munni Sabu (AMANAH)	56,264	40.78%	Mohd Syahrul Amri Mat Sari (IND)	319	0.23%	137,955	8,949	83.10%
2022	P113 Sepang	Raj Munni Sabu (AMANAH)	56,264	40.78%	Mohd Daud Leong Abdullah (PUR)	264	0.19%	137,955	8,949	83.10%
2022	P113 Sepang	Raj Munni Sabu (AMANAH)	56,264	40.78%	Muneswaran Muthiah (IND)	194	0.14%	137,955	8,949	83.10%
2022	P113 Sepang	Raj Munni Sabu (AMANAH)	56,264	40.78%	Nageswaran Ravi (PRM)	165	0.12%	137,955	8,949	83.10%

== Honours ==
=== Honours of Malaysia ===
- Malaysia
  - Recipient of the 17th Yang di-Pertuan Agong Installation Medal (2024)
- Sabah
  - Commander of the Order of Kinabalu (PGDK) – Datuk (2023)
