= Mohd Hasbie Muda =

Malaysian politician

Yang Berhormat Senator Tuan Mohd Hasbie Muda
- محمّد حسبي مودا

Senator Appointed by the Yang di-Pertuan Agong
- Incumbent
- Assumed office 20 March 2023
- Monarchs: Abdullah (2023–2024); Ibrahim (since 2024)
- Prime Minister: Anwar Ibrahim

Deputy Youth Chief of Pakatan Harapan
- Incumbent
- Assumed office 29 July 2022 Serving with Adam Adli Abd Halim; Nurthaqaffah Nordin; Felix Joseph Saang
- Leader: Kelvin Yii Lee Wuen

Youth Chief of the National Trust Party
- Incumbent
- Assumed office 23 October 2021
- President: Mohamad Sabu
- Deputy: Muhammad Taqiuddin Cheman (2021–2023); Danial Al Rashid Haron Aminar Rashid (since 2023)
- Preceded by: Shazni Munir Mohd Ithnin

State Chairman of Pakatan Harapan of Terengganu
- Incumbent
- Assumed office 23 November 2024
- National Chairman: Anwar Ibrahim
- Preceded by: Raja Kamarul Bahrin

State Chairman of the National Trust Party of Terengganu
- Incumbent
- Assumed office 14 February 2024
- President: Mohamad Sabu
- Preceded by: Raja Kamarul Bahrin Shah Raja Ahmad

Personal details
- Born: 1987 (age 38–39) Kampung Nyiur, Paka, Dungun, Terengganu
- Party: National Trust Party (AMANAH)
- Other political affiliations: Pakatan Harapan (PH)
- Spouse: Adila Abdullah
- Children: 5
- Education: Universiti Malaya (BEc)
- Occupation: Politician

Mohd Hasbie bin Muda (born 1987) is a Malaysian politician who has served as a Senator since March 2023. He is a member of the National Trust Party (AMANAH), component party of Pakatan Harapan (PH) coalitions where he has served as the Youth Chief of AMANAH from October 2021, Deputy Youth Chief of Pakatan Harapan since July 2022 and the State Chairman of Pakatan Harapan and the National Trust Party of Terengganu since 2024.

== Political career ==
On 20 March 2023, Mohd Hasbie Muda was appointed as a Senator by the Yang di-Pertuan Agong, Al-Sultan Abdullah.

Mohd Hasbie Muda was re-elected as the Youth Chief of the National Trust Party, alongside his new Deputy Youth Chief, Danial Al Rashid on 16 December 2023.

On 14 February 2024, he became the State Chairman of the National Trust Party of Terengganu, replacing Raja Kamarul Bahrin.

== Election results ==
Terengganu State Legislative Assembly
Year	Constituency	Candidate	Votes	Pct	Opponent(s)	Votes	Pct	Ballots cast	Majority	Turnout
2018	N28 Paka	Mohd Hasbie Muda (AMANAH)	1,866	8.42%	Satiful Bahari Mamat (PAS)	11,853	53.46%	22,527	3,405	85.20%
2018	N28 Paka	Mohd Hasbie Muda (AMANAH)	1,866	8.42%	Tengku Hamzah Tengku Draman (UMNO)	8,448	38.12%	22,527	3,405	85.20%

Parliament of Malaysia
Year	Constituency	Candidate	Votes	Pct	Opponent(s)	Votes	Pct	Ballots cast	Majority	Turnout
2022	P088 Temerloh	Mohd Hasbie Muda (AMANAH)	25,409	30.75%	Salamiah Mohd Nor (PAS)	30,929	37.43%	83,612	5,520	77.35%
2022	P088 Temerloh	Mohd Hasbie Muda (AMANAH)	25,409	30.75%	Mohd Sharkar Shamsudin (UMNO)	25,191	30.48%	83,612	5,520	77.35%
2022	P088 Temerloh	Mohd Hasbie Muda (AMANAH)	25,409	30.75%	Aminudin Yahaya (PEJUANG)	1,108	1.34%	83,612	5,520	77.35%

== Honours ==
- Malaysia :
  - Recipient of the 17th Yang di-Pertuan Agong Installation Medal (2024)
