= Nancy Shukri =

Malaysian politician and lawyer (born 1961)

Yang Berhormat Dato Sri Hajah Nancy Shukri PNBS SSAP PGBK KMN MP
- ننسي شكري
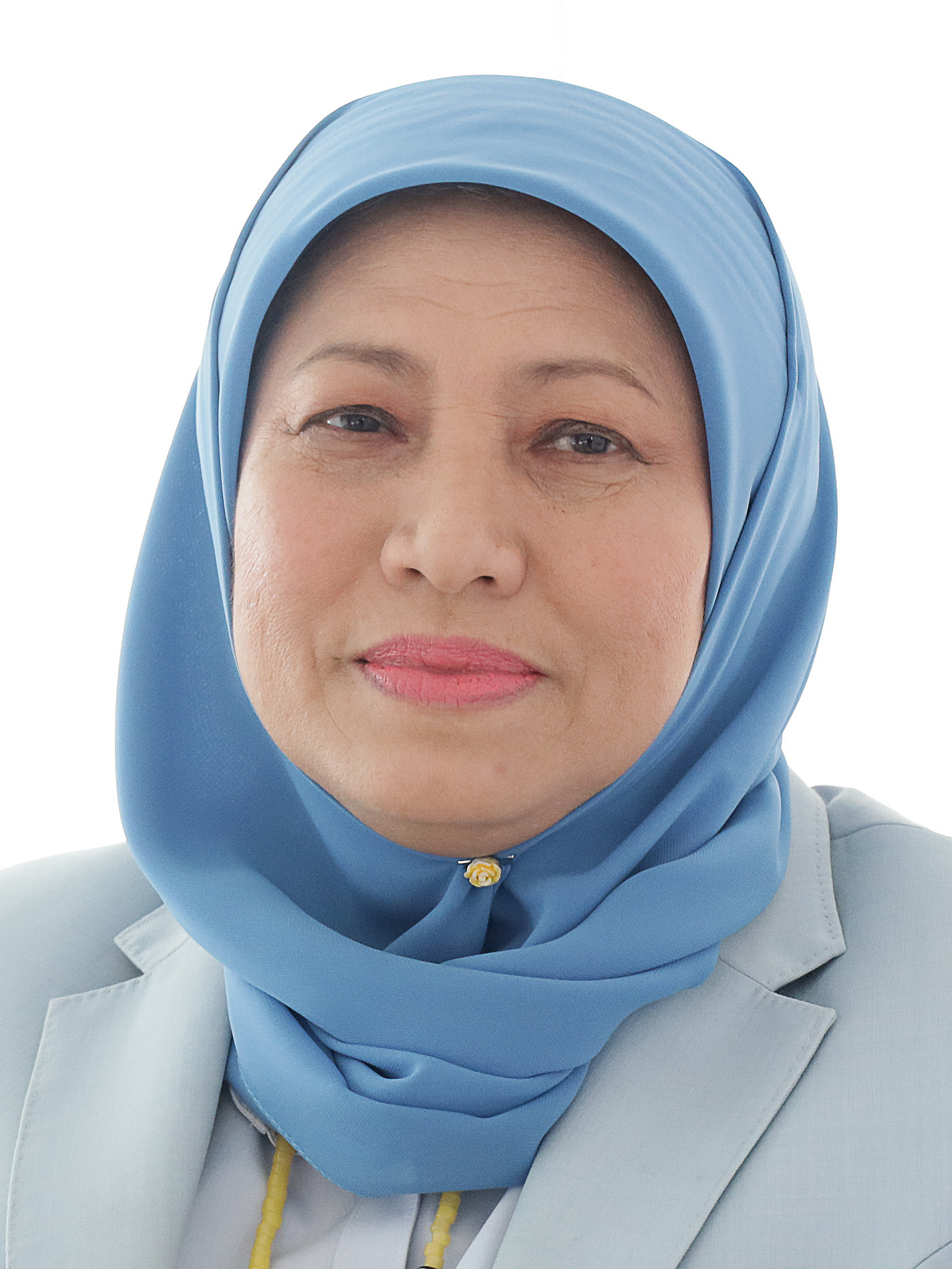
- Nancy in 2020

Minister of Women, Family and Community Development
- Incumbent
- Assumed office 3 December 2022
- Monarchs: Abdullah (2022–2024); Ibrahim (since 2024)
- Prime Minister: Anwar Ibrahim
- Deputy: Aiman Athirah (2022–2023); Noraini Ahmad (2023–2025); Lim Hui Ying (since 2025)
- Preceded by: Rina Harun

Minister of Tourism, Arts and Culture
- In office 30 August 2021 – 24 November 2022
- Monarch: Abdullah
- Prime Minister: Ismail Sabri Yaakob
- Minister: Wan Azizah Wan Ismail
- Deputy: Edmund Santhara
- Succeeded by: Tiong King Sing
- In office 10 March 2020 – 16 August 2021
- Prime Minister: Muhyiddin Yassin
- Deputy: Jeffrey Kitingan (2020); Guan Dee Koh Hoi (2021)
- Preceded by: Mohamaddin Ketapi

Minister in the Prime Minister's Department
- In office 28 June 2016 – 10 May 2018
- Monarchs: Abdul Halim (2016); Muhammad V (2016–2018)
- Prime Minister: Najib Razak
- Preceded by: Mah Siew Keong
- Succeeded by: Yeo Bee Yin (Minister of Energy, Science, Technology, Environment and Climate Change)
- In office 16 May 2013 – 27 June 2016
- Monarch: Abdul Halim
- Prime Minister: Najib Razak
- Deputy: Razali Ibrahim
- Preceded by: Nazri Abdul Aziz
- Succeeded by: Azalina Othman Said (Legal Affairs)

Minister of Plantation Industries and Commodities
- Acting
- In office 12 May 2016 – 27 June 2016
- Monarch: Abdul Halim
- Prime Minister: Najib Razak
- Preceded by: Douglas Uggah Embas
- Succeeded by: Mah Siew Keong
Parliamentary offices
Member of the Malaysian Parliament for Santubong
Incumbent
Assumed office 19 November 2022
Preceded by	Wan Junaidi Tuanku Jaafar
Majority	38,681 (2022)
Member of the Malaysian Parliament for Batang Sadong
In office 8 March 2008 – 19 November 2022
Preceded by	Adenan Satem
Succeeded by	Rodiyah Sapiee
Majority	5,425 (2008); 11,260 (2013); 12,328 (2018)

Personal details
- Born: 5 August 1961 (age 65) Kuching, Crown Colony of Sarawak
- Citizenship: Malaysia
- Party: Parti Pesaka Bumiputera Bersatu (2006–present)
- Other political affiliations: Barisan Nasional (until 2018); Gabungan Parti Sarawak (since 2018)
- Spouse: Kamil Misuari (m. 1985; died 2026)
- Children: 3
- Education: Universiti Teknologi MARA; University of Hull (LLB); Ohio University (MEBA)
- Occupation: Lawyer; politician
- Website: nancy-shukri.my

Nancy binti Shukri (Note: Jawi: ننسي بنت شكري) (born 5 August 1961) is a Malaysian politician and lawyer who has served as the Minister of Women, Family and Community Development since 2022. A member of Parti Pesaka Bumiputera Bersatu, she previously served in 2016 as the acting Minister of Plantation Industries and Commodities and Minister in the Prime Minister's Department from 2016 to 2018, as well as the Minister of Tourism, Arts and Culture from 2020 to 2021 and 2021 to 2022. Her 2022 appointment made her the longest-serving female federal minister from Sarawak.

== Early life and education ==
Nancy binti Shukri was born on 5 August 1961 in Kuching, Crown Colony of Sarawak, to Shukri Mahidi and Bibi McPherson. There are eleven siblings, and she is the tenth. Her father was of Malay and Melanau descent, while her mother had Scottish, Iban, and Chinese ancestry. She received her early education at Sekolah Rendah Padungan Council School from 1968 to 1973 and at Green Road Secondary School from 1974 to 1978.

Nancy obtained a Diploma in Public Administration from Institut Teknologi MARA in 1985, a Bachelor of Laws (Hons) from the University of Hull in 1990, and an Executive Master of Business Administration from Ohio University in 1998, graduating with Beta Gamma Sigma Distinction.

== Career ==
=== Early career ===
Nancy began her career in public service as part of the Legal Division of Kuching North City Hall, where she served from 1992 to 2003. She later became Political Secretary to Chief Minister Abdul Taib Mahmud from 2006 to 2008, during which she regarded him as an important influence on her entry into politics. In 2007, she was appointed Assistant Secretary-General of Parti Pesaka Bumiputera Bersatu (PBB).

She was first elected to the Dewan Rakyat in the March 2008 general election, succeeding Wan Junaidi Tuanku Jaafar. Nancy completed her tenure as Assistant Secretary-General of PBB in 2010, and in 2011 became Secretary of the PBB Women's Wing. In the same year, she contested the Batang Sadong parliamentary seat, securing 8,183 votes out of 11,120 cast, with 170 ballots spoilt. Nancy served as a member of the Select Committee on Lynas Advanced Materials Plant, established by the Dewan Rakyat on 20 March 2012 to review public concerns and safety standards related to the project.

=== Minister in the Prime Minister's Department ===
On 16 May 2013, Prime Minister Najib Razak appointed Nancy as a Minister in the Prime Minister's Department, where she succeeded Nazri Abdul Aziz in overseeing legal affairs. In this role, she was also responsible for the Malaysian Innovation Agency, the Malaysian Industry-Government Group for High Technology, and the Malaysian Nuclear Agency, in addition to continuing her oversight of the Land Public Transport Agency and the commercial vehicle licensing boards of Sabah and Sarawak.

On 30 June 2013, Nancy announced Malaysia's shift towards decriminalising drug dependence by treating dependants as patients, strengthening harm reduction policies, and reviewing existing drug laws. Later that year, on 23 September, she tabled the Legal Profession (Amendment) Act 2012 (Amendment) Act 2013, which liberalised the legal sector by allowing limited participation of foreign lawyers, aimed at enhancing Malaysia's global standing. On 22 October, she withdrawn the proposed amendment on the Penal Code that attempted to criminalise vandalism, desecration of foreign flags, and the use of unrecognised Malaysian flags, stating that such provisions would be placed under more a appropriate legislation and reworded to avoid disproportionate penalties.

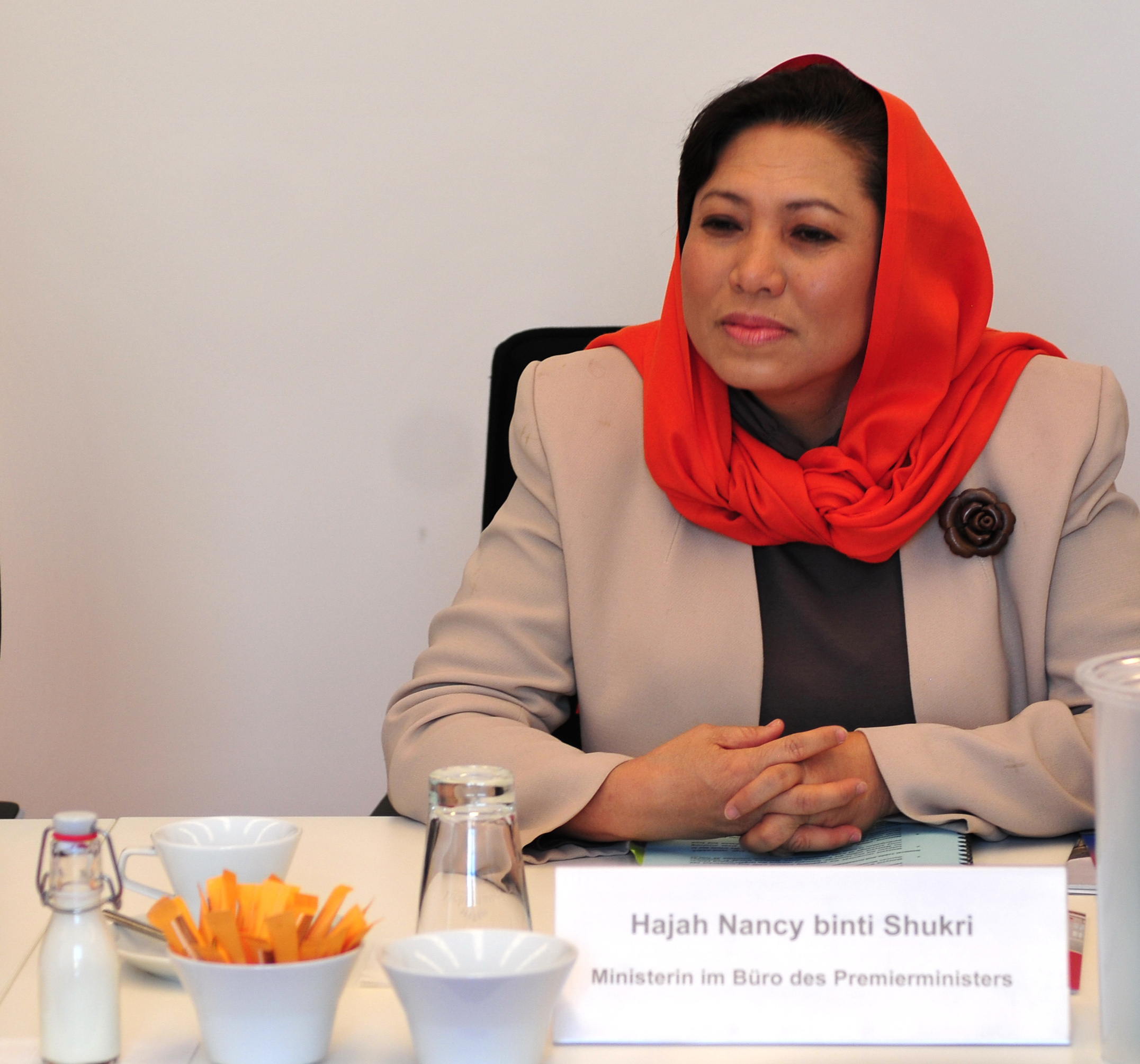
Nancy in 2014

In October 2014, Nancy distanced herself from the Attorney General's (AG) decision not to charge Perkasa president Ibrahim Ali under the Sedition Act. While she personally disagreed with Ibrahim's religious and racial views, she emphasised that it was not her role to advise the public prosecutor and that the decision was based on police findings. Nancy stressed her duty to uphold the rule of law and clarified that the choice not to prosecute was made fairly and without bias, in accordance with the Malaysian constitution.

On 13 May 2015, Nancy stated that the government would retain Section 375 of the Penal Code, meaning marital rape would not be fully criminalised, a decision that drew criticism for not adequately protecting women from spousal sexual abuse. Later that year, on 10 November, she dismissed a recycled viral claim alleging she had insulted Bumiputera, explaining that her words had been distorted for political purposes ahead of the Sarawak election and emphasising her focus on serving the people rather than responding to unfounded accusations.

In the 2016 state election for the Batang Sadong parliamentary seat, Nancy retained her position with 13,277 votes. That same year, she briefly served as acting Minister of Plantation Industries and Commodities after Douglas Uggah Embas resigned to become Sarawak Deputy Chief Minister. In a cabinet reshuffle on 28 June, she ended her role overseeing legal affairs in the Prime Minister's Department, succeeded by Azalina Othman Said, and was appointed to manage portfolios related to innovation, technology and nuclear power, taking over from Mah Siew Keong. Earlier, on 31 March, she clarified that although she was responsible for legal affairs in the department, the AG remained the rightful authority on legal matters, rejecting the label of "de facto law minister."

In January 2017, Nancy noted that Sarawak lawmakers had not yet been briefed on the bill proposed by Malaysian Islamic Party president Abdul Hadi Awang to strengthen Syariah Court powers. She cautioned that the state would not support the bill if it included hudud provisions, highlighting that such measures were unsuitable for Sarawak's predominantly non-Muslim population, and emphasised that state governments would have the final authority on implementation. Later that year, in August, Nancy highlighted the importance of adopting e-hailing applications for taxi drivers to remain competitive, underscoring the operational and economic advantages, and expressed confidence that the technology would modernise Malaysia's transport sector following its formal legal recognition and regulatory framework.

In the 2018 general election, Nancy retained the Batang Sadong seat with 14,208 votes, and later that year was succeeded by Yeo Bee Yin as Minister of Energy, Technology, Science, Climate Change and Environment.

=== Minister of Tourism, Arts and Culture ===
On 9 March 2020, Prime Minister Muhyiddin Yassin appointed Nancy as Minister of Tourism, Arts and Culture, with Jeffrey Kitingan as her deputy, effective the following day, and on 19 March, she announced the cancellation of the "Visit Malaysia 2020" campaign due to COVID-19, noting that tourism services were temporarily suspended under the movement control order while accommodations could operate at minimal capacity.

On 16 August 2021, Nancy, along with Muhyiddin and his cabinet, resigned following the loss of parliamentary majority, before being reappointed under Prime Minister Ismail Sabri Yaakob's cabinet on 27 August and sworn in on the 30th. During her tenure, she oversaw the creation of the National Cultural Policy 2021 in October, providing a roadmap for the development of Malaysian art, culture, and heritage industries. In December, she highlighted the impact of COVID-19 on women in tourism and guided recovery efforts through government support, the National Tourism Policy 2020–2030, and initiatives such as reopening Langkawi to vaccinated international tourists.

In the 2022 general election, Nancy won the Santubong parliamentary seat with 43,739 votes, securing a majority of 38,681, having been announced in November 2022 as Gabungan Parti Sarawak's candidate to replace Wan Junaidi.

=== Minister of Women, Family and Community Development ===
When Anwar Ibrahim formed his cabinet after being sworn in on 24 November 2022, Nancy was appointed Minister of Women, Family and Community Development on 3 December 2022, while Tiong King Sing succeeded her as Minister of Tourism, Arts and Culture. This appointment made her the longest-serving female federal minister from Sarawak. Later that month, on 29 December, Nancy announced that the cabinet had agreed in principle to establish a dedicated department or institution for children to better safeguard their welfare and interests.

On 15 February 2023, Nancy announced her ministry would draft regulations and establish a tribunal under the Anti-Sexual Harassment Act 2022. She later launched the Children's Development Department on 18 September 2023 to replace the Children's Division and address child neglect and abuse, and on 1 September 2024 highlighting the need to amend the Anti-Sexual Harassment Act to include organisational responsibility, noting gaps in holding organisations accountable for workplace harassment and committing to a study to guide the necessary legislative changes.

== Personal life ==
Nancy married businessman Kamil Misuari since 1985, and they have three children: Faeroz, Farouk, and Bibi Freka. Her maternal grandfather, John Andrew McPherson, served in the Charles Vyner Brooke administration in various roles, including magistrate, acting judge, and Resident, and was killed by the Japanese in 1942 while coordinating evacuation exercises.

== Election results ==
Parliament of Malaysia
Year	Constituency	Candidate	Votes	Pct	Opponent(s)	Votes	Pct	Ballot casts	Majority	Turnout
2008	P200 Batang Sadong	Nancy Shukri (PBB)	8,183	74.79%	Piee Ling (PKR)	2,758	25.21%	11,120	5,425	66.21%
2013	P200 Batang Sadong	Nancy Shukri (PBB)	13,277	86.81%	Mohamad Jolhi (PKR)	2,017	13.19%	15,541	11,260	78.34%
2018	P200 Batang Sadong	Nancy Shukri (PBB)	14,208	83.25%	Othman Mustapha @ Mos (AMANAH)	1,880	11.02%	17,349	12,328	74.74%
2018	P200 Batang Sadong	Nancy Shukri (PBB)	14,208	83.25%	Asan Singkro (PAS)	978	5.73%	17,349	12,328	74.74%
2022	P193 Santubong	Nancy Shukri (PBB)	43,739	84.42%	Mohamad Zen Peli (AMANAH)	5,058	9.76%	52,762	38,681	66.33%
2022	P193 Santubong	Nancy Shukri (PBB)	43,739	84.42%	Affendi Jeman (IND)	3,012	5.81%	52,762	38,681	66.33%

== Awards and honours ==
In October 2022, Nancy was recognised at the 6th Malaysia Tourism Council Gold Awards, receiving the Tourism Icon Inspirational Woman in Tourism award for her contributions to the industry. The honours conferred to her are as follows:

- Malaysia
  - Officer of the Order of the Defender of the Realm (KMN) (2010)
  - Recipient of the 15th Yang di-Pertuan Agong Installation Medal (2017)
  - Recipient of the 17th Yang di-Pertuan Agong Installation Medal (2024)
- Pahang
  - Knight Grand Companion of the Order of Sultan Ahmad Shah of Pahang (SSAP) – Dato' Sri (2016)
- Sarawak
  - Knight Commander of the Most Exalted Order of the Star of Sarawak (PNBS) – Dato Sri (2021)
  - Commander of the Order of the Star of Hornbill Sarawak (PGBK) – Datuk (2016)
  - Recipient of the Sarawak Independence Golden Jubilee Medal (2013)
  - Gold Medal of the Sarawak Independence Diamond Jubilee Medal (2023)
