= UiTM Perlis =

University in Arau, Perlis, Malaysia

Universiti Teknologi MARA, Perlis Branch
- Universiti Teknologi MARA, Cawangan Perlis اونيۏرسيتي تيكنولوڬي مارا چاوڠن ڤرليس
- Seal of Universiti Teknologi MARA
- Former names: RIDA Training Centre (1956–1965), MARA College (1965–1967), MARA Institute of Technology (1967–1999)
- Motto: Usaha Taqwa Mulia اوسها تقوى مليا
- Motto in English: Endeavour, God-Consciousness, Dignity
- Type: Public
- Established: 5 July 1974
- Chairman: Azlinda Azman
- Chancellor: Duli Yang Maha Mulia Seri Paduka Baginda Yang di-Pertuan Agong
- Vice-Chancellor: Shahrin bin Sahib
- Rector: Shukor Sanim Mohd Fauzi
- Pro-Chancellors: 1. DYMM Tengku Permaisuri Selangor Tengku Permaisuri Hajah Norashikin; 2. YABhg. Tun Datuk Seri Panglima Hj. Ahmadshah Abdullah; 3. YABhg. Tun Arshad Ayub; 4. YBhg. Tan Sri Dato' Sri Sallehuddin Mohamed; 5. YBhg. Tan Sri Dato’ Sri Hj. Safri Awang Zaidell; 6. YBhg. Tan Sri Dato' Sri Zarinah Anwar
- Academic staff: 320
- Administrative staff: 310
- Students: more than 40 000
- Location: Arau, Perlis, Malaysia; 6°27′0″N 100°16′46″E
- Campus: Suburban
- Colours: Purple and blue
- Website: perlis.uitm.edu.my

Universiti Teknologi MARA (UiTM) Cawangan Perlis (Jawi: اونيۏرسيتي تيكنولوڬي مارا چاوڠن ڤرليس; Abbreviation: UiTM Perlis) is one of the branch campuses of Universiti Teknologi MARA located in Arau, Perlis, Malaysia. It was established in 1974 at Kangar, making it as the third oldest UiTM campus in the whole country. In 1980, the campus moved to their permanent location in Arau. Now, UiTM Perlis is the largest branch campus around the country, by the number of student and also the total courses offered.

== History ==
Universiti Teknologi MARA (UiTM) has substantially evolved over the past 50 years through an era of continued progress. This includes the change in name from Institut Teknologi MARA to Universiti Teknologi MARA in 1999. Befitting the occasion, Seri Paduka Baginda Yang di-Pertuan Agong is designated the Chancellor of the university. As the third oldest branch campus, UiTM Perlis is also the largest UiTM branch campus, after the main campus in Shah Alam. It is a premier institution of higher learning in Perlis. It was officially established on 5 July 1974, with a pioneer intake 258 students, undergoing 1 preparatory course and 5 diploma programmes.

At its inception, there were 15 academic staff, assisted by 31 administrative and support staff. The campus then operated at a temporary site of the Scouts House at Padang Katong Road, Kangar. In 1980, the campus moved to its permanent site in Arau, on a 335-acre plot granted by the state government. The Raja Perlis and the state government, totalling 464 acres of campus land. 240 acres of this land are designated for farming and the agricultural unit for the purpose of education, research and as tourist attraction. In 2004, further 129 acres were allocated for research and development activities.

== Faculties and academic centres ==
There are 7 faculties and 35 programmes offered in UiTM Perlis:

Science

- Faculty of Architecture, Planning and Surveying (AP)
- Faculty of Applied Science (AS)
- Faculty of Plantation and Agrotechnology (AT)
- Faculty of Computer and Mathematical Sciences (CS)
- Faculty of Sport and Recreational Sciences (SR)

Business and Management

- Faculty of Accountancy (AC)
- Faculty of Business Management (BM) (Note: With reference to the Vice Chancellor's Circular No. 19/2011, the Faculty of Office Management and Technology (OM) has been merged with the Faculty of Business Management (BM), effective 1 September 2011.)

== Key Departments ==
- Rector's Office
- Administrative Division
- Academic Affairs Division
- Student Affairs Division
- Infostructure Division
- Auxiliary Police Office
- Research and Industrial Linkage Division (PJI)
- Bursary Office
- Dato Jaafar Hassan Library
- Facility Management Division
