= Minister of Women, Family and Community Development (Malaysia) =

Government minister of Malaysia

- Menteri Pembangunan Wanita, Keluarga dan Masyarakat

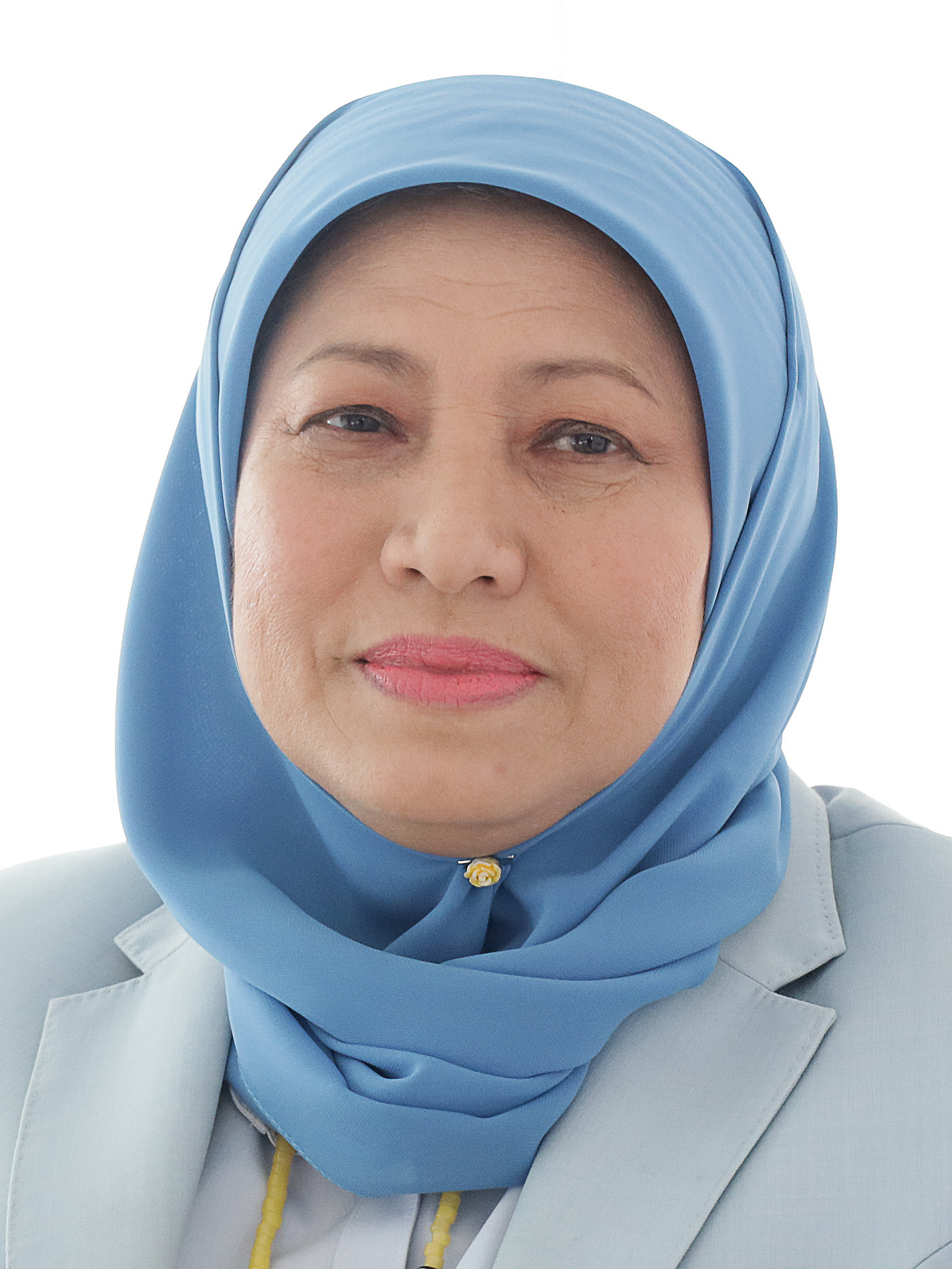
- Incumbent; Nancy Shukri since 3 December 2022
- Ministry of Women, Family and Community Development
- Style: Yang Berhormat Menteri (The Honourable Minister)
- Abbreviation: KPWKM
- Member of: Cabinet of Malaysia
- Reports to: Parliament of Malaysia
- Seat: Putrajaya
- Appointer: Yang di-Pertuan Agong on the recommendation of the Prime Minister of Malaysia
- Formation: 17 January 2001
- First holder: Shahrizat Abdul Jalil as Minister of Women Affairs
- Deputy: Lim Hui Ying
- Website: www.kpwkm.gov.my

The Minister of Women, Family and Community Development is Nancy Shukri, since 3 December 2022. The Minister administers the portfolio through the Ministry of Women, Family and Community Development.

== List of ministers ==
=== Women and family ===
The following individuals have been appointed as Minister of Women, or any of its precedent titles:

Political party: Alliance/BN PH PN GPS

Portrait	Name (Birth–Death) Constituency	Political party	Title	Took office	Left office	Deputy Minister	Prime Minister (Cabinet)
	Shahrizat Abdul Jalil (b. 1953); MP for Lembah Pantai	BN (UMNO)	Minister of Women Affairs	17 January 2001	18 March 2008	Vacant (2001–2004); Palanivel Govindasamy (2004–2008)	Mahathir Mohamad (VI); Abdullah Ahmad Badawi (I • II)
	Shahrizat Abdul Jalil (b. 1953); MP for Lembah Pantai	BN (UMNO)	Minister of Women and Family Development	17 January 2001	18 March 2008	Vacant (2001–2004); Palanivel Govindasamy (2004–2008)	Mahathir Mohamad (VI); Abdullah Ahmad Badawi (I • II)
	Shahrizat Abdul Jalil (b. 1953); MP for Lembah Pantai	BN (UMNO)	Minister of Women, Family and Community Development	17 January 2001	18 March 2008	Vacant (2001–2004); Palanivel Govindasamy (2004–2008)	Mahathir Mohamad (VI); Abdullah Ahmad Badawi (I • II)
	Ng Yen Yen (b. 1946); MP for Raub	BN (MCA)	Minister of Women, Family and Community Development	19 March 2008	9 April 2009	Noriah Kasnon	Abdullah Ahmad Badawi (III)
	Shahrizat Abdul Jalil (b. 1953); Senator	BN (UMNO)	Minister of Women, Family and Community Development	10 April 2009	8 April 2012	Chew Mei Fun (2009–2010); Heng Seai Kie (2010–2012)	Najib Razak (I)
	Najib Razak (b. 1953) (Prime Minister); MP for Pekan; Acting	BN (UMNO)	Acting Minister of Women, Family and Community Development	8 April 2012	15 May 2013	Heng Seai Kie	Najib Razak (I)
	Rohani Abdul Karim (b. 1955); MP for Batang Lupar	BN (PBB)	Minister of Women, Family and Community Development	16 May 2013	9 May 2018	Azizah Mohd Dun (2013–2018); Chew Mei Fun (2014–2018)	Najib Razak (II)
	Wan Azizah Wan Ismail (b. 1952) (Deputy Prime Minister); MP for Pandan	PH (PKR)	Minister of Women, Family and Community Development	21 May 2018	24 February 2020	Hannah Yeoh Tseow Suan	Mahathir Mohamad (VII)
	Rina Harun (b. 1973); MP for Titiwangsa	PN (BERSATU)	Minister of Women, Family and Community Development	10 March 2020	24 November 2022	Siti Zailah Mohd Yusoff	Muhyiddin Yassin (I); Ismail Sabri Yaakob (I)
	Nancy Shukri (b. 1961); MP for Santubong	GPS (PBB)	Minister of Women, Family and Community Development	3 December 2022	Incumbent	Aiman Athirah Sabu (2022–2023); Noraini Ahmad (2023–2025); Lim Hui Ying (2025–present)	Anwar Ibrahim (I)

=== Community ===
The following individuals have been appointed as Minister of Community, or any of its precedent titles:

Political party: Alliance/BN PH PN GPS

Portrait	Name (Birth–Death) Constituency	Political party	Title	Took office	Left office	Deputy Minister	Prime Minister (Cabinet)
	Napsiah Omar (1943–2018); MP for Kuala Pilah	BN (UMNO)	Minister of National Unity and Community Development	27 October 1990	3 May 1995	Alexander Lee Yu Lung	Mahathir Mohamad (IV)
	Zaleha Ismail (1936–2020); MP for Gombak	BN (UMNO)	Minister of National Unity and Community Development	4 May 1995	14 December 1999	Peter Tinggom Kamarau	Mahathir Mohamad (V)
	Siti Zaharah Sulaiman (1949–2024); MP for Paya Besar	BN (UMNO)	Minister of National Unity and Community Development	15 December 1999	26 March 2004	Tiki Lafe	Mahathir Mohamad (VI); Abdullah Ahmad Badawi (I)
	Shahrizat Abdul Jalil (b. 1953); MP for Lembah Pantai	BN (UMNO)	Minister of Women Affairs	17 January 2001	18 March 2008	Vacant (2001–2004); Palanivel Govindasamy (2004–2008)	Mahathir Mohamad (VI); Abdullah Ahmad Badawi (I • II)
	Shahrizat Abdul Jalil (b. 1953); MP for Lembah Pantai	BN (UMNO)	Minister of Women and Family Development	17 January 2001	18 March 2008	Vacant (2001–2004); Palanivel Govindasamy (2004–2008)	Mahathir Mohamad (VI); Abdullah Ahmad Badawi (I • II)
	Shahrizat Abdul Jalil (b. 1953); MP for Lembah Pantai	BN (UMNO)	Minister of Women, Family and Community Development	17 January 2001	18 March 2008	Vacant (2001–2004); Palanivel Govindasamy (2004–2008)	Mahathir Mohamad (VI); Abdullah Ahmad Badawi (I • II)
	Ng Yen Yen (b. 1946); MP for Raub	BN (MCA)	Minister of Women, Family and Community Development	19 March 2008	9 April 2009	Noriah Kasnon	Abdullah Ahmad Badawi (III)
	Shahrizat Abdul Jalil (b. 1953); Senator	BN (UMNO)	Minister of Women, Family and Community Development	10 April 2009	8 April 2012	Chew Mei Fun (2009–2010); Heng Seai Kie (2010–2012)	Najib Razak (I)
	Najib Razak (b. 1953) (Prime Minister); MP for Pekan; Acting	BN (UMNO)	Acting Minister of Women, Family and Community Development	8 April 2012	15 May 2013	Heng Seai Kie	Najib Razak (I)
	Rohani Abdul Karim (b. 1955); MP for Batang Lupar	BN (PBB)	Minister of Women, Family and Community Development	16 May 2013	9 May 2018	Azizah Mohd Dun (2013–2018); Chew Mei Fun (2014–2018)	Najib Razak (II)
	Wan Azizah Wan Ismail (b. 1952) (Deputy Prime Minister); MP for Pandan	PH (PKR)	Minister of Women, Family and Community Development	21 May 2018	24 February 2020	Hannah Yeoh Tseow Suan	Mahathir Mohamad (VII)
	Rina Harun (b. 1973); MP for Titiwangsa	PN (BERSATU)	Minister of Women, Family and Community Development	10 March 2020	24 November 2022	Siti Zailah Mohd Yusoff	Muhyiddin Yassin (I); Ismail Sabri Yaakob (I)
	Nancy Shukri (b. 1961); MP for Santubong	GPS (PBB)	Minister of Women, Family and Community Development	3 December 2022	Incumbent	Aiman Athirah Sabu (2022–2023); Noraini Ahmad (2023–2025); Lim Hui Ying (2025–present)	Anwar Ibrahim (I)

=== Social welfare ===
The following individuals have been appointed as Minister of Welfare, or any of its precedent titles:

Political party: Alliance/BN

Portrait	Name (Birth–Death) Constituency	Political party	Title	Took office	Left office	Deputy Minister	Prime Minister (Cabinet)
	Leong Yew Koh (1888–1963); MP for Ipoh-Menglembu	Alliance (MCA)	Minister of Health and Social Welfare	1956	31 August 1957	Vacant	Chief Minister of the Federation of Malaya; Tunku Abdul Rahman (I)
	Ong Yoke Lin (1917–2010); MP for Ulu Selangor	Alliance (MCA)	Minister of Labour and Social Welfare	1957	1962	Vacant	Tunku Abdul Rahman (II)
	Ong Yoke Lin (1917–2010); MP for Ulu Selangor	Alliance (MCA)	Minister of Health and Social Welfare	1957	1962	Vacant	Tunku Abdul Rahman (II)
	Bahaman Samsudin (1906–1995); MP for Kuala Pilah	Alliance (UMNO)	Minister of Labour and Social Welfare	1962	1964	Vacant	Tunku Abdul Rahman (II)
	Abdul Hamid Khan (1900–1974); MP for Batang Padang	Alliance (UMNO)	Minister of Welfare Services	1964	1966	Vacant	Tunku Abdul Rahman (III)
	Ng Kam Poh (1926–2014); MP for Telok Anson	Alliance (MCA)	Minister of General Welfare	1966	1969	Vacant	Tunku Abdul Rahman (III)
	Fatimah Hashim (1924–2010); MP for Jitra-Padang Terap	Alliance (UMNO)	Minister of Social Welfare	1970	1972	Vacant	Abdul Razak Hussein (I)
	Aishah Ghani (1923–2013); Senator (1972-1974); MP for Kuala Langat (1974-1975)	BN (UMNO)	Minister of General Welfare	1972	1985	Vacant	Abdul Razak Hussein (I · II); Mahathir Mohamad (I · II)
	Abu Hassan Omar (1940–2018); MP for Kuala Selangor	BN (UMNO)	Minister of Social Welfare	1985	1986	Vacant	Mahathir Mohamad (II)
	Shahrir Abdul Samad (b. 1949); MP for Johor Bahru	BN (UMNO)	Minister of Social Welfare	11 August 1986	20 May 1987	Vacant	Mahathir Mohamad (III)
	Mustaffa Mohammad (d. 2021); MP for Sri Gading	BN (UMNO)	Minister of Social Welfare	20 May 1987	26 October 1990	Vacant	Mahathir Mohamad (III)
