= Shazni Munir Mohd Ithnin =

Malaysian politician (1987–2021)

Youth Chief of the Pakatan Harapan
- In office 4 March 2021 – 6 August 2021
- Preceded by: Syed Saddiq Syed Abdul Rahman
- Succeeded by: Howard Lee Chuan How

Youth Chief of the National Trust Party
- In office 4 July 2020 – 6 August 2021
- Preceded by: Hasnul Zulkarnain Abdul Munaim
- Succeeded by: Mohd Hasbie Muda

Personal details
- Born: Shazni Munir bin Mohd Ithnin; 14 January 1987 Segamat, Johor, Malaysia
- Died: 6 August 2021 (aged 34)
- Cause of death: COVID-19
- Resting place: Tanah Perkuburan Islam Kampung Permatang Pasir, Bukit Pasir, Muar, Johor
- Party: National Trust Party (AMANAH)
- Spouse: Zarith Noor Abdul Kahar (m. 2012)
- Children: 3
- Education: Universiti Malaya
- Occupation: Politician

Shazni Munir bin Mohd Ithnin (14 January 1987 – 6 August 2021) is the former Youth Chief of Pakatan Harapan and National Trust Party (AMANAH). He is also the former President of the Islamic Student Association Universiti Malaya (PMIUM).

== Background ==
Shazni Munir is from Segamat, Johor. He was previously an intermediate level Bachelor of Islamic Studies and Science (Biotechnology) student at the Islamic Studies Academy, University of Malaya. He has been the President of the Student Representative Council (MPP) of APIUM Nilam Puri, Kelantan for the 2006 and 2007 sessions. He is also the co-founder and council member of the Student Movement to abolish AUKU (GMMA). He has held the position of President of the University of Malaya Muslim Students Association (PMIUM), Deputy President of the All-Malaysian Muslim Students Association (GAMIS) and Chairman of Malaysian Student Solidarity (SMM).

== Politics ==
On 8 December 2019, Shazni Munir became the Vice Youth Chief of the National Trust Party.

On 4 July 2020, Hasnul Zulkarnain, the former Youth Chief of the AMANAH Party, resigned from the party, and Shazni Munir became the head of the Youth Chief of the AMANAH Party.

On 5 March 2021, Shazni Munir became the head of the PH Youth Chief.

== Death ==
When Malaysia was hit by the COVID-19 epidemic, he died on 6 August 2021 due to the fifth stage of COVID-19 infection. He left behind a widow and three children.
