= Ministry of Plantation and Commodities =

Government ministry of Malaysia

- Kementerian Perladangan dan Komoditi (MPIC) كمنترين ڤرلاداڠن دان كومودتي
- Coat of arms of Malaysia

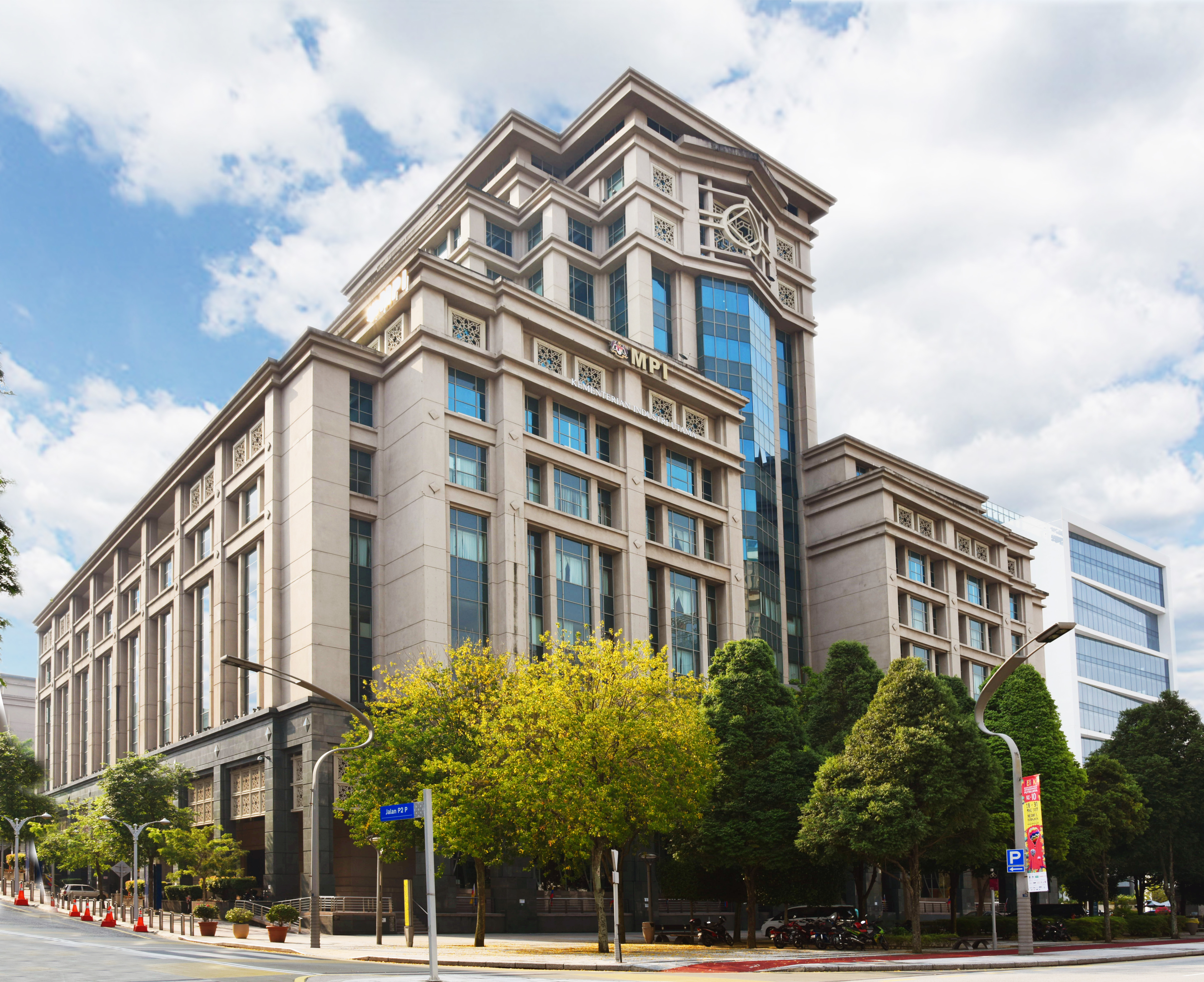
- Ministry of Plantation and Commodities

Ministry overview
- Formed: 2004; 22 years ago
- Preceding Ministry: Ministry of Primary Industries (MPI)
- Jurisdiction: Government of Malaysia
- Headquarters: No. 15, Level 6-13, Persiaran Perdana, Precinct 2, Federal Government Administrative Centre, 62654 Putrajaya
- Employees: 299 (2019)
- Annual budget: MYR 810,086,800 (2026)
- Minister responsible: Datuk Seri Dr. Noraini Ahmad, Minister of Plantation and Commodities
- Deputy Minister responsible: Dato' Sri Huang Tiong Sii, Deputy Minister of Plantation and Commodities
- Ministry executives: Dato' Yusran Shah bin Mohd Yusof, Secretary-General; Dato' Razali bin Mohamad, Deputy Secretary-General (Plantation and Commodities); Shafie bin Taib, Deputy Secretary-General (Strategic Planning and Management)
- Website: www.kpk.gov.my

Footnotes
- Ministry of Plantation and Commodities on Facebook

The Ministry of Plantation and Commodities (Malay: Kementerian Perladangan dan Komoditi; Jawi: كمنترين ڤرلاداڠن دان كومودتي) is a ministry of the Government of Malaysia that is responsible for overseeing the development of the main commodities of Malaysia which are palm oil, rubber, timber, furniture, cocoa, pepper, kenaf and tobacco.

This ministry was formerly known as the Ministry of Plantation Industries and Commodity (MPIC) before its name was changed in 2022.

== Overview ==
The plantation and commodities sector has contributed significantly to the country’s economic development for the past 50 years. Since then, the sector has become one of Malaysia’s major exports earnings. Exports values of these commodities and commodity-based products in 2012 was RM 127.5 billion, constituted 18.2 per cent of total export earnings.

In 2012, Kementerian Perusahaan Perladangan dan Komoditi (KPPK) was rebranded to the Ministry of Plantation Industries and Commodities (MPIC).

In 2018, the name was changed again, to the Ministry of Primary Industries (MPI).

In 2020, MPI was renamed again to the Ministry of Plantation Industries and Commodities (MPIC).

== Organisation ==
- Minister
  - Deputy Minister
    - Secretary-General
        - Legal Advisory
        - Internal Audit Unit
        - Corporate Communication Unit
        - Integrity Unit
      - Deputy Secretary-General (Plantation and Commodities)
        - Palm Oil and Sago Industry Development Division
        - Timber, Tobacco and Kenaf Industries Development Division
        - Rubber and Jatropha Industry Development Division
        - Cocoa and Pepper Industry Development Division
        - Biofuel Division
      - Deputy Secretary General (Strategic Planning and Management)
        - Strategic Planning and International Division
        - Innovation Promotion and Industrial Human Capital Division
        - Administration, Development and Financial Management Division
        - Human Resource Management Division
        - Information Management Division

=== Federal agencies ===
1. Malaysian Palm Oil Board (MPOB), or Lembaga Minyak Sawit Malaysia. (Official site)
2. Malaysian Rubber Board (MRB), or Lembaga Getah Malaysia (LGM). (Official site)
3. Malaysian Timber Industry Board (MTIB), or Lembaga Perindustrian Kayu Malaysia. (Official site)
4. Malaysian Cocoa Board (MCB), or Lembaga Koko Malaysia. (Official site)
5. National Kenaf and Tobacco Board (LKTN), or Lembaga Kenaf dan Tembakau Malaysia (LKTN). (Official site)
6. Malaysian Pepper Board (MPB), or Lembaga Lada Malaysia. (Official site)
7. Malaysian Palm Oil Certification Council (MPOCC), or Majlis Persijilan Minyak Sawit Malaysia. (Official site)
8. Malaysian Palm Oil Council (MPOC), or Majlis Minyak Sawit Malaysia.
9. Malaysian Rubber Export Promotion Council (MREPC), or Majlis Promosi Eksport Getah Malaysia. (Official site)
10. Malaysian Timber Council (MTC), or Majlis Kayu Malaysia. (Official site)
11. Malaysian Timber Certification Council (MTCC), or Majlis Persijilan Kayu Malaysia. (Official site)

== Key legislation ==
The Ministry of Plantation Industries and Commodities (MPIC) is responsible for administration of several key Acts.

== Ministers ==
Minister	Portrait	Office	Executive Experience
Noraini Ahmad		Minister of Plantation and Commodities	MP for Parit Sulong (March 2008 – current); Deputy Minister of Human Resources (March 20048 – April 2009); Chairperson of the Public Accounts Committee (April 2019 – March 2020); Minister of Higher Education (March 2020 – August 2021; August 2021 – November 2022); Chairperson of the Rubber Industry Smallholders Development Authority (March 2023 – January 2024); Deputy Minister of Women, Family and Community Development (December 2023 – December 2025)
Huang Tiong Sii		Deputy Minister of Plantation and Commodities	MLA for Repok (June 2016 – current); MP for Sarikei (November 2022 – current); Deputy Minister of Natural Resources, Environment and Climate Change (December 2022 – December 2023); Deputy Minister of Natural Resources and Environmental Sustainability (December 2023 – December 2025)

== See also ==
- Ministers of Plantation Industries and Commodities (Malaysia)
