= 2023 Malaysian cabinet reshuffle =

First cabinet reshuffle carried out by Malaysian Prime Minister Anwar Ibrahim

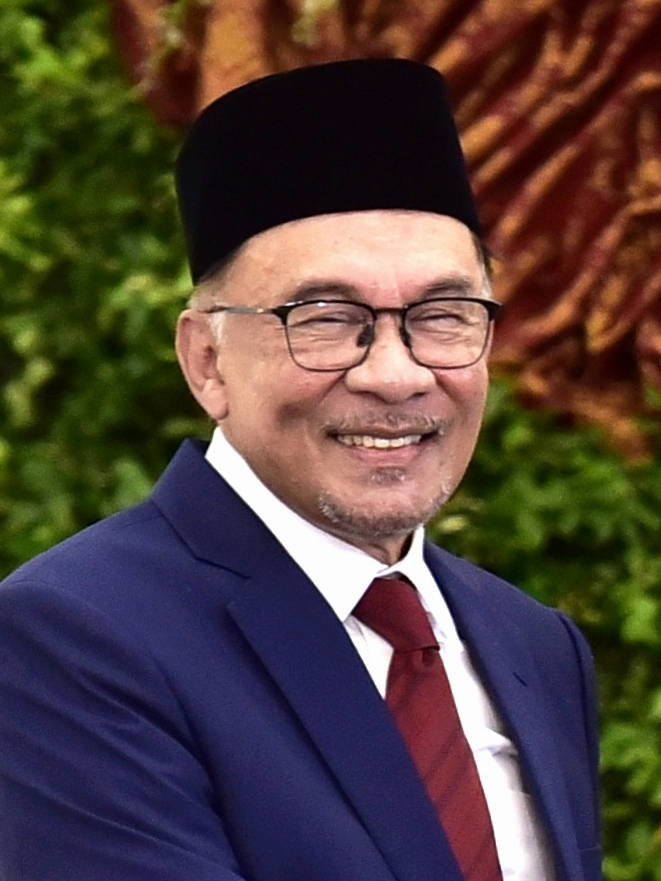
Anwar Ibrahim

Malaysian Prime Minister Anwar Ibrahim carried out the first cabinet reshuffle of his premiership on 12 December 2023. Amir Hamzah Azizan was appointed the Minister of Finance II, Steven Sim Chee Keong was promoted to the Minister of Human Resources to replace V. Sivakumar, Dzulkefly Ahmad was reappointed the Minister of Health to replace Zaliha Mustafa, Gobind Singh Deo was appointed the Minister of Digital and Johari Abdul Ghani was appointed the Minister of Plantation and Commodities to replace Fadillah Yusof.

== Background ==
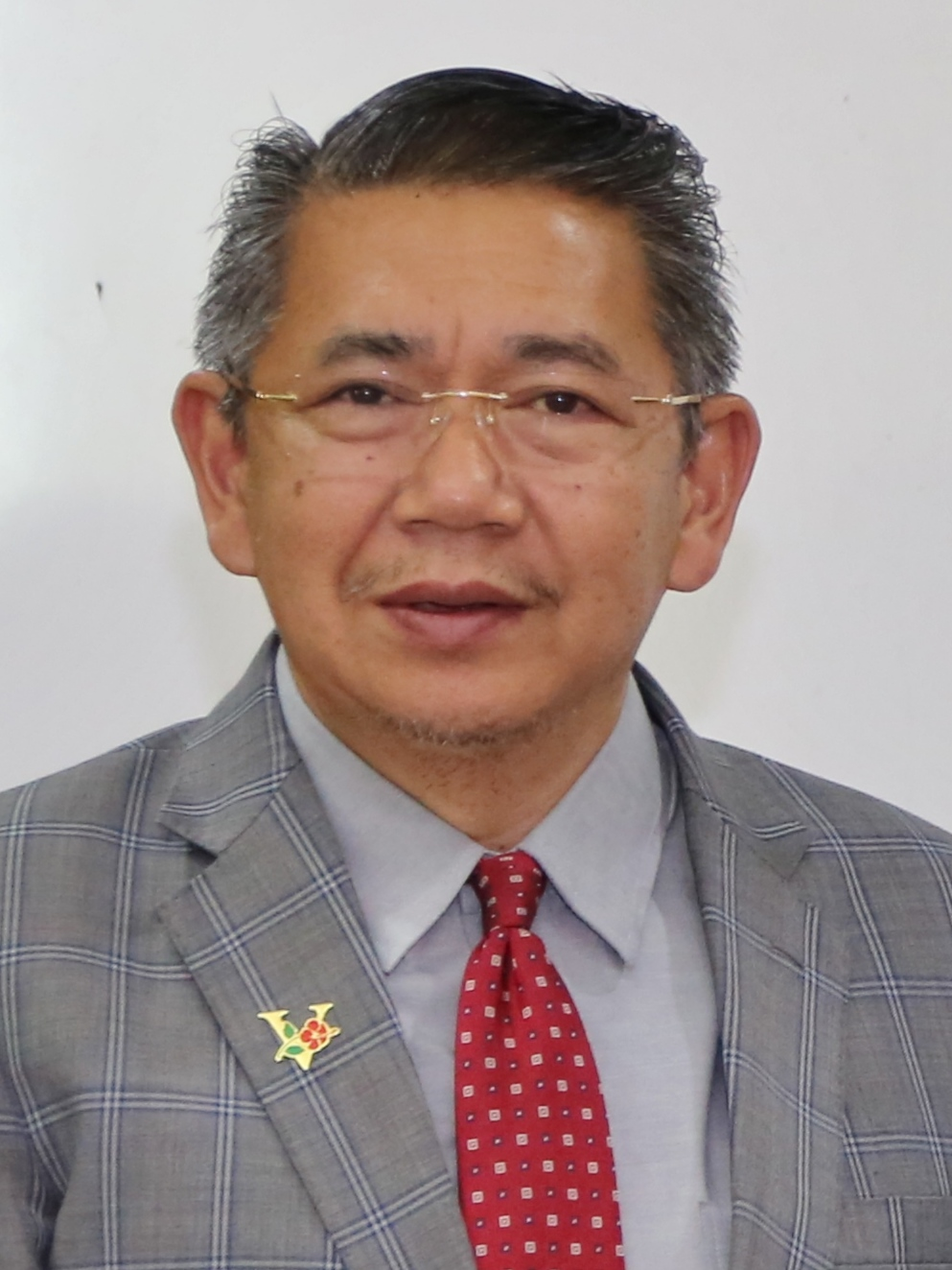
Salahuddin Ayub

Salahuddin Ayub, the Minister of Domestic Trade and Costs of Living, died in office on 23 July 2023 as a result of brain hemorrhage. Armizan Mohd Ali, the Minister in the Prime Minister's Department (Sabah and Sarawak Affairs & Special Duties) was then appointed to replace Salahuddin as the acting minister on 30 July 2023. His death triggered the cabinet reshuffle as the vacant position he left was expected to be filled in the cabinet reshuffle. Before the reshuffle, speculations and rumours about the reshuffle have been rife. In response, Anwar, Deputy Prime Ministers Ahmad Zahid Hamidi and Fadillah as well as other Cabinet ministers neither confirmed nor denied. They and other Members of Parliament (MPs) also stressed that carrying out a reshuffle is the prerogative of Anwar as the Prime Minister. Some political parties also voiced their opinions on the reshuffle. Anwar added that the vacant position would only be filled when there was a suitable candidate. Fadillah added that Anwar would carry out the reshuffle based on skillset, knowledge and expertise of an individual. On 11 December 2023, it was confirmed that the cabinet reshuffle would be carried out with the swearing-in ceremony of the new Cabinet ministers and deputy ministers taking place at the Istana Negara at 2.30 pm the following day on 12 December 2023.

== Changes ==
=== Minister changes ===
While retaining their positions, both Deputy Prime Ministers Zahid and Fadillah were assigned with additional portfolios. Zahid is also responsible for National Disaster Management Agency, while Fadillah is responsible for Sabah and Sarawak, a portfolio which was held by Armizan Mohd Ali, now permanently appointed as Minister of Domestic Trade and Costs of Living and reassigned into new portfolio, namely Minister of Energy Transition and Public Utility, a new portfolio created after the previous Ministry of Natural Resources, Environment and Climate Change was split into two ministries, the other one being Ministry of Natural Resources and Environmental Sustainability which is being held by Nik Nazmi Nik Ahmad. He was previously the NRECC minister. Meanwhile, Fadillah's previous portfolio, the Minister of Plantations and Commodities was held by Johari Abdul Ghani, which made his first ministerial appointment after five years.

The Ministry of Communications and Digital, which was led by Fahmi Fadzil, was another ministry that was split. He went on to become the Minister of Communications, while Gobind Singh Deo returned to the cabinet as the Minister of Digital, a portfolio that once being held by himself from 2018 until 2020 under the name of Ministry of Communications and Multimedia.

Zambry Abdul Kadir, Khaled Nordin and Mohamad Hasan, three Barisan Nasional member in the cabinet, swapped their portfolios between each other. Zambry was appointed as the Minister of Higher Education, replacing Khaled which himself succeed Mohamad as the Minister of Defence. Mohamad, on the other hand, was appointed as the Minister of Foreign Affairs, replacing Zambry.

Dr. Zaliha Mustafa was appointed as the Minister in the Prime Minister's Department (Federal Territories), signifying the return of that portfolio into the cabinet. Dr. Dzulkefly Ahmad reappointed as the Minister of Health after holding that position in the seventh Mahathir cabinet.

To assist Anwar as Minister of Finance, former chief executive officer of the Employees Provident Fund (EPF), Amir Hamzah Azizan was appointed as the ministry's second minister. His appointment as Senator hours before reshuffle announcement sparked rumours that he will joins the cabinet.

V. Sivakumar was the only minister to be dropped from the cabinet. His position was filled by Steven Sim Chee Keong, who was promoted as minister after serving as second Deputy Minister of Finance.

== Cabinet-level changes ==
Colour key
- Joined the Cabinet
- Portfolio created or split
- Left the Cabinet

Minister	Position before reshuffle	Position after reshuffle
Amir Hamzah Azizan	None	Minister of Finance II
Fadillah Yusof	Minister of Plantation and Commodities	Minister of Energy Transition and Public Utilities & assigned to the Sabah and Sarawak Affairs portfolio
Mohamad Hasan	Minister of Defence	Minister of Foreign Affairs
Mohamed Khaled Nordin	Minister of Higher Education	Minister of Defence
Nik Nazmi Nik Ahmad	Minister of Natural Resources, Environment and Climate Change	Minister of Natural Resources and Environmental Sustainability
Zambry Abdul Kadir	Minister of Foreign Affairs	Minister of Higher Education
Fahmi Fadzil	Minister of Communications and Digital	Minister of Communications
Dzulkefly Ahmad	Backbench MP	Minister of Health
Gobind Singh Deo	Backbench MP	Minister of Digital
Armizan Mohd Ali	Minister in the Prime Minister's Department (Sabah and Sarawak Affairs & Special Duties)	Minister of Domestic Trade and Costs of Living
Johari Abdul Ghani	Backbench MP	Minister of Plantation and Commodities
Zaliha Mustafa	Minister of Health	Minister in the Prime Minister's Department (Federal Territories)
Steven Sim Chee Keong	Deputy Minister of Finance II	Minister of Human Resources
V. Sivakumar	Minister of Human Resources	Dismissed from the government

== Deputy ministerial changes ==
Colour key
- Joined the government
- Promoted
- Portfolio created or split
- Left the government

Deputy Minister	Position before reshuffle	Position after reshuffle
Abdul Rahman Mohamad	Deputy Minister of Works	Deputy Minister of Human Resources
Ahmad Maslan	Deputy Minister of Finance II	Deputy Minister of Works
Aiman Athirah Sabu	Deputy Minister of Women, Family and Community Development	Deputy Minister of Local Government Development
Akmal Nasrullah Mohd Nasir	Deputy Minister of Local Government Development	Deputy Minister of Energy Transition and Public Utilities
Arthur Joseph Kurup	Deputy Minister of Science, Technology and Innovation	Deputy Minister of Agriculture and Food Security
Chan Foong Hin	Deputy Minister of Agriculture and Food Security	Deputy Minister of Plantation and Commodities
Huang Tiong Sii	Deputy Minister of Natural Resources, Environment and Climate Change	Deputy Minister of Natural Resources and Environmental Sustainability
Lim Hui Ying	Deputy Minister of Education	Deputy Minister of Finance
M. Kulasegaran	Backbench MP	Deputy Minister in the Prime Minister's Department (Law and Institutional Reform)
Yusof Apdal	Deputy Minister of Higher Education	Deputy Minister of Science, Technology and Innovation
Mustapha Sakmud	Deputy Minister of Human Resources	Deputy Minister of Higher Education
Noraini Ahmad	Backbench MP	Deputy Minister of Women, Family and Community Development
Ramanan Ramakrishnan	Backbench MP	Deputy Minister of Entrepreneur Development and Cooperatives
Ramkarpal Singh	Deputy Minister in the Prime Minister's Department (Law and Institutional Reform)	Resigned from the government
Saraswathy Kandasami	Deputy Minister of Entrepreneur Development and Cooperatives	Deputy Minister of National Unity
Siti Aminah Aching	Deputy Minister of Plantation and Commodities	Dismissed from the government
Teo Nie Ching	Deputy Minister of Communications and Digital	Deputy Minister of Communications
Wilson Ugak Kumbong	Deputy Minister in the Prime Minister's Department (Sabah and Sarawak Affairs & Special Duties)	Deputy Minister of Digital
Wong Kah Woh	Backbench MP	Deputy Minister of Education
Zulkifli Hasan	None	Deputy Minister in the Prime Minister's Department (Religious Affairs)
