= Wong Ling Biu =

Malaysian politician

- 黄灵彪

Member of the Malaysian Parliament for Sarikei
- In office 5 May 2013 – 19 November 2022
- Preceded by: Ding Kuong Hiing (BN–SUPP)
- Succeeded by: Huang Tiong Sii (GPS–SUPP)
- Majority: 505 (2013); 2,570 (2018)

Personal details
- Born: Wong Ling Biu; 12 February 1959 (age 67)
- Citizenship: Malaysian
- Party: Democratic Action Party (DAP)
- Other political affiliations: Pakatan Rakyat (PR) (2008–2015); Pakatan Harapan (PH) (since 2015)
- Children: Jackie Wong Siew Cheer; Roderick Wong Siew Lead
- Occupation: Politician
- Other names: Andrew Wong Ling Biu

Wong Ling Biu (simplified Chinese: 黄灵彪; traditional Chinese: 黃靈彪; pinyin: Huáng Língbiāo) is a Malaysian politician who served as the Member of Parliament (MP) for Sarikei from May 2013 to November 2022. He is a member of the Democratic Action Party (DAP), a component party of the Pakatan Harapan (PH) and formerly Pakatan Rakyat (PR) coalitions.

On 7 March 2020, Wong was admitted at Sibu Hospital as a patient under investigation (PUI) for COVID-19 and was later tested positive on 15 March 2020. After a 79-day admission including 42 days of coma, Wong was finally discharged on 30 May 2020. His son, the national hammer thrower champion Jackie Wong Siew Cheer, had also contracted the COVID-19 virus from him, was discharged earlier on 27 May after 73 days treatment at the same hospital since 16 March. In 2021, Wong was among six elected representatives from Sarikei Division to receive their first dose of the COVID-19 vaccine.

In 2022 Malaysian general election, Wong decided not to contest for the Sarikei parliamentary seat. His son, Roderick Wong, which was his special assistant, replaced him for the quest of the seat. However, his son Roderick failed to defend the seat.

== Election results ==
Parliament of Malaysia
Year	Constituency		Votes	Pct	Opponent(s)	Votes	Pct	Ballots cast	Majority	Turnout
2013	P208 Sarikei, Sarawak	Wong Ling Biu (DAP)	14,263	50.90%	Ding Kuong Hiing (SUPP)	13,758	49.10%	28,353	505	77.58%
2018	P208 Sarikei, Sarawak	Wong Ling Biu (DAP)	16,327	53.57%	Huang Tiong Sii (SUPP)	13,757	45.14%	30,895	2,570	78.09%
2018	P208 Sarikei, Sarawak	Wong Ling Biu (DAP)	16,327	53.57%	Wong Chin King (PBK)	392	1.29%	30,895	2,570	78.09%
