= 2023 cabinet reshuffle =

2023 cabinet reshuffle may refer to:

- 2023 British cabinet reshuffle
  - February 2023 British cabinet reshuffle
  - November 2023 British cabinet reshuffle
- 2023 British shadow cabinet reshuffle
- 2023 Canadian cabinet reshuffle
- 2023 Indonesian cabinet reshuffle
- 2023 Malaysian cabinet reshuffle
- 2023 Norwegian cabinet reshuffle
- 2023 South African cabinet reshuffle
- Second Kishida Cabinet (Second Reshuffle)

== See also ==
- 2022 cabinet reshuffle
- 2024 cabinet reshuffle
- July 2023 French government reshuffle
