= Paul Leong Khee Seong =

Malaysian politician (born 1939)

Yang Berbahagia Dato' Paul Leong Khee Seong DPCM
- 梁棋祥

Minister of Primary Industries
- In office 28 July 1978 – 10 August 1986
- Monarchs: Yahya Petra; Ahmad Shah; Iskandar
- Prime Minister: Hussein Onn; Mahathir Mohamad
- Deputy: Bujang Ulis; Megat Junid Megat Ayub
- Preceded by: Abdul Taib Mahmud
- Succeeded by: Lim Keng Yaik
- Constituency: Taiping

Chancellor of HELP University
- Incumbent
- Assumed office 2012
- President: Paul Chan Tuck Hoong
- Preceded by: Inaugural holder

Deputy Minister of Primary Industries
- In office 1974–1978
- Monarchs: Abdul Halim; Yahya Petra
- Prime Minister: Abdul Razak Hussein; Hussein Onn
- Minister: Musa Hitam; Abdul Taib Mahmud
- Preceded by: Yusof Rawa
- Succeeded by: Bujang Ulis
- Constituency: Taiping

Member of the Malaysian Parliament for Taiping
- In office 1974–1990
- Preceded by: Constituency established
- Succeeded by: Kerk Choo Ting (BN–Gerakan)
- Majority: 3,187 (1974); 8,022 (1978); 15,278 (1982); 5,644 (1986)

Personal details
- Born: Paul Leong Khee Seong; 1939 (age 86–87) Ipoh, Perak, Federated Malay States (now Malaysia)
- Citizenship: Malaysian
- Party: Malaysian Chinese Association (MCA) (1965–1972); Parti Gerakan Rakyat Malaysia (Gerakan)
- Other political affiliations: Barisan Nasional (BN)
- Education: University of New South Wales
- Occupation: Politician

Paul Leong Khee Seong (born 1939) is a Malaysian former politician from the Parti Gerakan Rakyat Malaysia (Gerakan) who served as four-term Member of Parliament (MP) of Malaysia for Taiping between 1974 and 1990. He was also Minister of Primary Industries of Malaysia between 1978 and 1986. He is currently the Chancellor of HELP University.

== Background ==
Leong was born in Ipoh, Perak to a family involved in tin mining and plantation with ancestral roots in Guangdong, China. Before entering politics, he was working in his father's business.

== Political career ==
Leong entered the Malaysian politics scene after the 13 May incident. Prior to joining Gerakan, he was a member of the Malaysian Chinese Association (MCA) and last served as its Perak Chairman in 1972. Over the next two decades, he served in various posts within Gerakan which saw him eventually occupy the office of deputy chairman.

Having been elected into Parliament between 1974 and 1990, Leong was appointed as Deputy Minister of Primary Industries in 1974 before being promoted to Minister of Primary Industries four years later.

During his tenure as Malaysia's Minister of Primary Industries, he also held several international posts. These included Chairman of the General Agreement on Tariffs and Trade (GATT) Negotiating Committee in Tropical Products from 1986 to 1987 and Chairman of the Group of Fourteen on Association of Southeast Asian Nations (ASEAN) Economic Co-operation and Integration in 1986.

== Education ==
Leong graduated from the University of New South Wales with a Bachelor of Chemical Engineering in 1963.

== Personal life ==
Following his retirement from politics, Leong has been active in the corporate sector. Among the many offices he has held includes serving as the Executive Chairman of Nanyang Press Holdings Berhad (2007–2009) and Deputy Chairman of Sin Chew Media Corporation (2004–2007), Independent non-executive director of AirAsia (2004–2013) and TSH Resources Limited (2005–2014).

Since 2010, he has been an Independent non-executive director of the Industrial and Commercial Bank of China Limited (Malaysia). In 2012, he was appointed as the first Chancellor of HELP University following the university's accordance of university status.

== Election results ==
Parliament of Malaysia
| Year | Constituency | Candidate | Votes | Pct | Opponent(s) | Votes | Pct | Ballots cast | Majority | Turnout |
|---|---|---|---|---|---|---|---|---|---|---|
| 1974 | P049 Taiping | Paul Leong Khee Seong (Gerakan) | 14,253 | 53.19% | Loh Poh Seng (DAP) | 11,066 | 41.30% | 27,522 | 3,187 | 75.62% |
| 1974 | P049 Taiping | Paul Leong Khee Seong (Gerakan) | 14,253 | 53.19% | Chow Chong Leng (PEKEMAS) | 999 | 3.73% | 27,522 | 3,187 | 75.62% |
| 1974 | P049 Taiping | Paul Leong Khee Seong (Gerakan) | 14,253 | 53.19% | Ng Hoe Hun (KITA) | 479 | 1.79% | 27,522 | 3,187 | 75.62% |
| 1978 | P049 Taiping | Paul Leong Khee Seong (Gerakan) | 20,915 | 57.21% | Loh Poh Seng (DAP) | 12,893 | 35.27% | 37,593 | 8,022 | 79.72% |
| 1978 | P049 Taiping | Paul Leong Khee Seong (Gerakan) | 20,915 | 57.21% | Abdul Samad Hussin (PAS) | 2,752 | 7.53% | 37,593 | 8,022 | 79.72% |
| 1982 | P049 Taiping | Paul Leong Khee Seong (Gerakan) | 25,841 | 66.04% | Kong Cheok Seng (DAP) | 10,563 | 26.99% | 40,154 | 15,278 | 74.12% |
| 1982 | P049 Taiping | Paul Leong Khee Seong (Gerakan) | 25,841 | 66.04% | Mohamed Junid (PAS) | 2,726 | 6.97% | 40,154 | 15,278 | 74.12% |
| 1986 | P054 Taiping | Paul Leong Khee Seong (Gerakan) | 20,969 | 57.78% | Kong Cheok Seng (DAP) | 15,325 | 42.22% | 37,543 | 5,644 | 66.33% |

== Honours ==
- Perak
  - Knight Commander of the Order of Cura Si Manja Kini (DPCM) - Dato' (1979)
