= Ahmad Masrizal Muhammad =

Malaysian politician

Yang Berbahagia Dato' Ahmad Masrizal Muhammad DIMP
- أحمد مسريزال محمّد
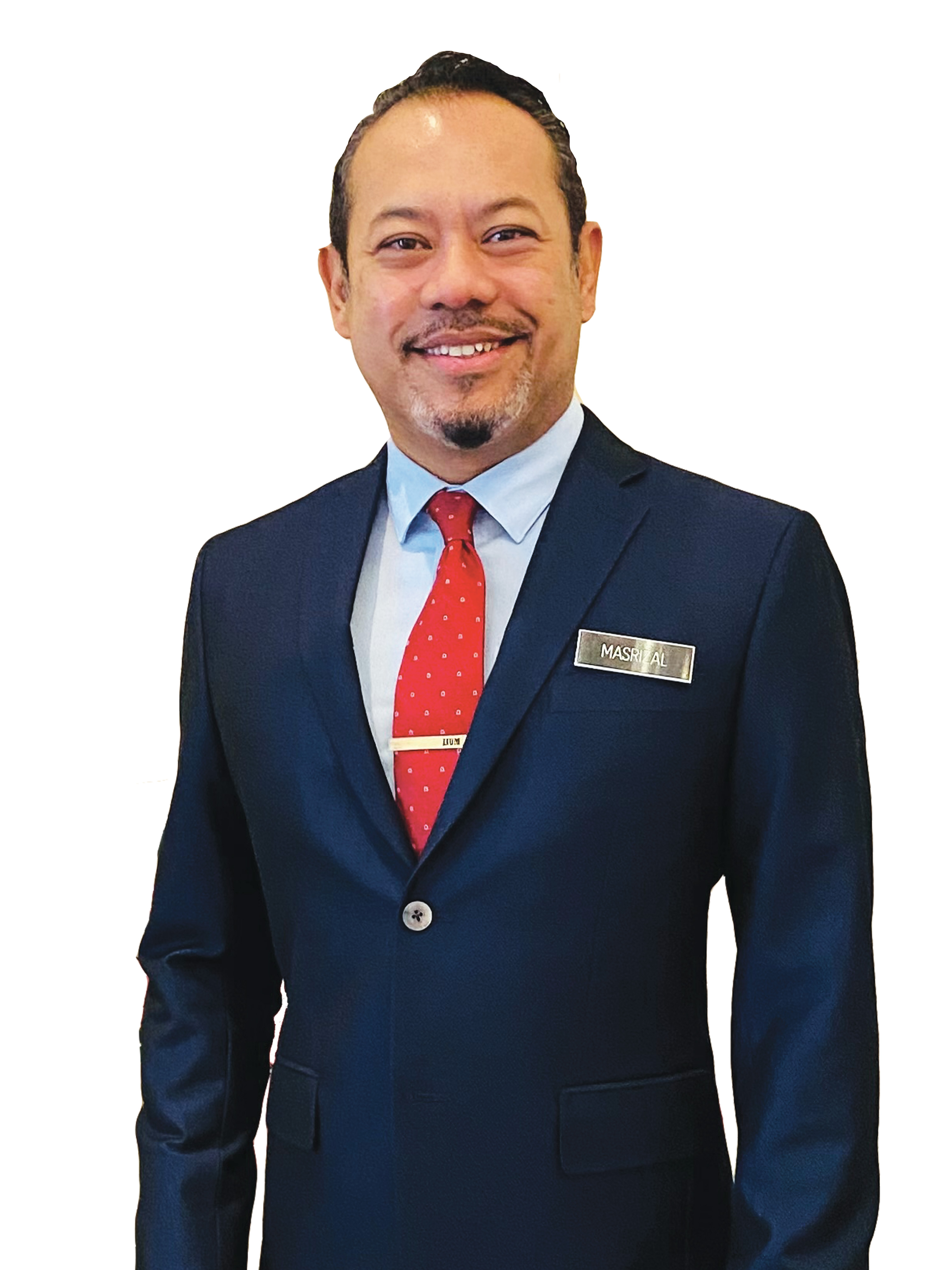

Deputy Minister of Higher Education
- In office 30 August 2021 – 24 November 2022
- Monarch: Abdullah
- Prime Minister: Ismail Sabri Yaakob
- Minister: Noraini Ahmad
- Preceded by: Mansor Othman
- Succeeded by: Yusof Apdal

Deputy Minister of Environment and Water
- In office 10 March 2020 – 16 August 2021
- Monarch: Abdullah
- Prime Minister: Muhyiddin Yassin
- Minister: Tuan Ibrahim Tuan Man
- Preceded by: Isnaraissah Munirah Majilis (Deputy Minister of Energy, Science, Technology, Environment and Climate Change); Tengku Zulpuri Shah Raja Puji (Deputy Minister of Water, Land and Natural Resources)
- Succeeded by: Mansor Othman

Senator Appointed by the Yang di-Pertuan Agong
- In office 10 March 2020 – 9 March 2023
- Monarch: Abdullah
- Prime Minister: Muhyiddin Yassin (2020–2021); Ismail Sabri Yaakob (2021–2022); Anwar Ibrahim (2022–2023)

Faction represented in Dewan Negara
- 2020–2023: Barisan Nasional

Personal details
- Born: Ahmad Masrizal bin Muhammad Malaysia
- Party: United Malays National Organisation (UMNO)
- Other political affiliations: Barisan Nasional (BN)
- Education: Universiti Sains Malaysia; University of Malaya; National University of Malaysia
- Profession: Politician

Ahmad Masrizal bin Muhammad is a Malaysian politician who served as the Deputy Minister of Higher Education in the Barisan Nasional (BN) administration under former Prime Minister Ismail Sabri Yaakob and former Minister Noraini Ahmad from August 2021 to the collapse of the BN administration in November 2022 and Deputy Minister of Environment and Water in the Perikatan Nasional (PN) administration under former Prime Minister Muhyiddin Yassin and former Minister Tuan Ibrahim from March 2020 to the collapse of the PN administration in August 2021 as well as Senator from March 2020 to March 2023. He is a member of the United Malays National Organisation (UMNO), a component party of the BN coalition.

== Honours ==
- Pahang :
  - Knight Companion of the Order of the Crown of Pahang (DIMP) – Dato' (2017)
