= 2024 cabinet reshuffle =

2024 cabinet reshuffle may refer to:

- 2024 Canadian cabinet reshuffle
- 2024 Indonesian cabinet reshuffle
- 2024 Namibian cabinet reshuffle
- 2024 Swedish cabinet reshuffle

== See also ==
- 2023 cabinet reshuffle (disambiguation)
