= 2023 British cabinet reshuffle =

2023 British cabinet reshuffle may refer to:

- February 2023 British cabinet reshuffle
- November 2023 British cabinet reshuffle

== See also ==
- 2023 British shadow cabinet reshuffle
- 2023 cabinet reshuffle (disambiguation)
