= Repok =

State constituency in Sarawak, Malaysia

Repok (N45)
Sarawak constituency

State constituency
- Legislature: Sarawak State Legislative Assembly
MLA
Vacant
- Constituency created: 1968; 58 years ago
- First contested: 1969
- Last contested: 2021

Repok is a state constituency in Sarawak, Malaysia, that has been represented in the Sarawak State Legislative Assembly since 1969.

The state constituency was created in the 1968 redistribution and is mandated to return a single member to the Sarawak State Legislative Assembly under the first past the post voting system.

== Demographics ==
Ethnic breakdown of Repok's electorate as of 2022
1. Chinese (67.7%)
2. Sarawak bumiputera (23.2%)
3. Malay-Muslim bumiputera (8.70%)
4. Other ethnicities (0.40%)

== History ==
As of 2020, Repok has a population of 24,175 people.

=== Polling districts ===
According to the gazette issued on 31 October 2022, the Repok constituency has a total of 8 polling districts.

State constituency	Polling Districts	Code	Location
Repok (N45)	Bulat	208/45/01	SK Selangan; SJK (C) Siung Hua Sg. Sebanyak; SJK (C) Bulat
Repok (N45)	Pantak	208/45/02	SMK Tinggi Sarikei
Repok (N45)	Repok	208/45/03	SMK Bandar Sarikei
Repok (N45)	Sarikei	208/45/04	SMK St. Anthony Sarikei
Repok (N45)	Merudu	208/45/05	SJK (C) Su Lok Merudu; SJK (C) Su Lee Sg Baji
Repok (N45)	Peninjau	208/45/06	SJK (C) Sze Lu; SJK (C) Tiong Ho
Repok (N45)	Paoh	208/45/07	SMK Sg. Paoh; SK St. Martin Sarikei
Repok (N45)	Nyelong Park	208/45/08	SK St. Anne Sarikei

=== Representation history ===
Members of the Legislative Assembly for Repok
Assembly	No	Years	Member	Party
Constituency created
8th	N24	1970–1973	Khoo Peng Loong (邱炳農)	SUPP
8th	N24	1973–1974	Khoo Peng Loong (邱炳農)	BN (SUPP)
9th	N24	1974–1979	Chong Siew Chiang (張守江)	BN (SUPP)
10th	N25	1979–1983	Law Hieng Ding (劉賢鎮)	BN (SUPP)
11th	N25	1983–1987	David Teng Lung Chi (鄧倫奇)	BN (SUPP)
12th	N25	1987–1991	David Teng Lung Chi (鄧倫奇)	BN (SUPP)
13th	N32	1991-1996	David Teng Lung Chi (鄧倫奇)	BN (SUPP)
14th	N34	1996–2001	David Teng Lung Chi (鄧倫奇)	BN (SUPP)
15th	N34	2001–2006	David Teng Lung Chi (鄧倫奇)	BN (SUPP)
16th	N39	2006–2011	David Teng Lung Chi (鄧倫奇)	BN (SUPP)
17th	N39	2011–2016	Wong Hua Seh (黃華西)	PR (DAP)
18th	N45	2016–2018	Huang Tiong Sii (范长锡)	BN (SUPP)
18th	N45	2018–2021	Huang Tiong Sii (范长锡)	GPS (SUPP)
19th	N45	2021–2026	Huang Tiong Sii (范长锡)	GPS (SUPP)

== Election results ==
Sarawak state election, 2026: Repok
Party	Candidate	Votes	%	∆%
GPS				▲
PH				▲
Total valid votes				
Total rejected ballots				
Unreturned ballots				
Turnout				
Registered electors				
Majority				

Sarawak state election, 2021: Repok
Party	Candidate	Votes	%	∆%
GPS	Huang Tiong Sii	10,038	73.15	▲73.15
DAP	Philip Wong Pack Ming	2,730	19.90	▼25.48
PBK	Wong Kung King	738	5.38	▲5.38
ASPIRASI	Wong Chin King	216	1.57	▼1.09
Total valid votes		13,722	100.00	
Total rejected ballots		116		
Unreturned ballots		46		
Turnout		13,884	58.98	▼12.59
Registered electors		23,541		
Majority		7,308	53.26	▲46.68
GPS gain from BN		Swing		?
Source(s) https://lom.agc.gov.my/ilims/upload/portal/akta/outputp/1718688/PUB687.pdf

Sarawak state election, 2016: Repok
Party	Candidate	Votes	%	∆%
BN	Huang Tiong Sii	7,446	51.96	▲12.17
DAP	Yong Siew Wei	6,503	45.38	▼14.83
Independent	Wong Chin King	381	2.66	▲2.66
Total valid votes		14,330	100.00	
Total rejected ballots		145		
Unreturned ballots		28		
Turnout		14,503	71.57	▼0.87
Registered electors		20,263		
Majority		943	6.58	▼13.84
BN gain from DAP		Swing		?
Source(s) "Federal Government Gazette - Notice of Contested Election, State Legislative Assembly of the State of Sarawak [P.U. (B) 190/2016]" (PDF). Attorney General's Chambers of Malaysia. 25 April 2016. Archived from the original (PDF) on 2017-06-12. "Senarai Calon yang Disahkan Layak Bertanding Pilihan Raya Dewan Undangan Negeri ke-11". Election Commission of Malaysia. 25 April 2016. Archived from the original on 25 April 2016.

Sarawak state election, 2011: Repok
Party	Candidate	Votes	%	∆%
DAP	Wong Hua Seh	7,900	60.21	▲12.97
BN	David Teng Lung Chi	5,221	39.79	▼12.97
Total valid votes		13,121	100.00	
Total rejected ballots		243		
Unreturned ballots		23		
Turnout		13,387	72.44	▲9.42
Registered electors		18,481		
Majority		2,679	20.42	▲14.90
DAP gain from BN		Swing		?
Source(s) "Federal Government Gazette - Results of Contested Election and Statements of the Poll after the Official Addition of Votes Sarawak [P.U. (B) 245/2011]" (PDF). Attorney General's Chambers of Malaysia. 29 April 2011.

Sarawak state election, 2006: Repok
Party	Candidate	Votes	%	∆%
BN	David Teng Lung Chi	5,502	52.76	▼14.13
DAP	Kung Chin Chin	4,926	47.24	▲35.20
Total valid votes		10,428	100.00	
Total rejected ballots		85		
Unreturned ballots		43		
Turnout		10,556	63.02	▼6.37
Registered electors		16,750		
Majority		576	5.52	▼40.30
BN hold		Swing		

Sarawak state election, 2001: Repok
Party	Candidate	Votes	%	∆%
BN	David Teng Lung Chi	8,421	66.89	▲66.89
PKR	Wong Hua She	2,652	21.07	▲21.07
DAP	Wong Sing Ai	1,516	12.04	▲12.04
Total valid votes		12,589	100.00	
Total rejected ballots		142		
Unreturned ballots		11		
Turnout		12,742	69.39	
Registered electors		18,362		
Majority		5,769	45.82	
BN hold		Swing		

Sarawak state election, 1996: Repok
Party	Candidate	Votes	%	∆%
On the nomination day, David Teng Lung Chi won uncontested.
BN	David Teng Lung Chi			
Total valid votes			100.00	
Total rejected ballots				
Unreturned ballots				
Turnout				
Registered electors		18,250		
Majority				
BN hold		Swing		

Sarawak state election, 1991: Repok
Party	Candidate	Votes	%	∆%
BN	David Teng Lung Chi	6,491	55.64	▲1.84
DAP	Chong Siew Chiang	5,088	43.61	▼2.59
NEGARA	Mawan Wass	87	0.75	▲0.75
Total valid votes		11,666	100.00	
Total rejected ballots		106		
Unreturned ballots		46		
Turnout		11,818	76.03	▼1.00
Registered electors		15,543		
Majority		1,403	12.03	▲4.43
BN hold		Swing		

Sarawak state election, 1987: Repok
Party	Candidate	Votes	%	∆%
BN	David Teng Lung Chi	6,479	53.80	▲0.45
DAP	Wong Sin Nang	5,564	46.20	▼0.45
Total valid votes		12,043	100.00	
Total rejected ballots		97		
Unreturned ballots		0		
Turnout		12,140	77.03	▼2.66
Registered electors		15,760		
Majority		915	7.60	▲0.91
BN hold		Swing		

Sarawak state election, 1983: Repok
Party	Candidate	Votes	%	∆%
BN	David Teng Lung Chi	5,791	53.35	▲1.44
DAP	Chong Siew Chiang	5,065	46.65	▼1.44
Total valid votes		10,856	100.00	
Total rejected ballots		103		
Unreturned ballots		0		
Turnout		10,959	79.92	
Registered electors		13,712		
Majority		726	6.69	▲2.86
BN hold		Swing		

Sarawak state election, 1979: Repok
Party	Candidate	Votes	%	∆%
BN	David Teng Lung Chi	4,601	51.91	▼7.15
DAP	Chong Siew Chiang	4,262	48.09	▲48.09
Total valid votes		8,863	100.00	
Total rejected ballots		64		
Unreturned ballots		0		
Turnout		8,927	79.95	▲5.08
Registered electors		11,166		
Majority		339	3.83	▼14.28
BN hold		Swing		

Sarawak state election, 1974: Repok
Party	Candidate	Votes	%	∆%
BN	Chong Siew Chiang	2,667	59.06	▲11.91
SNAP	Ng King Huong	1,849	40.94	▲24.35
Total valid votes		4,516	100.00	
Total rejected ballots		290		
Unreturned ballots		0		
Turnout		4,806	74.87	▼10.96
Registered electors		6,419		
Majority		818	18.11	▲6.08
BN gain from SUPP		Swing		?

Sarawak state election, 1969: Repok
Party	Candidate	Votes	%
SUPP	Khoo Peng Loong	2,399	47.15
SCA	Chen Ko Ming	1,787	35.12
SNAP	Ngu King Huong	844	16.59
Independent	Ching Ting Chiok	58	1.14
Total valid votes		5,088	100.00
Total rejected ballots		255	
Unreturned ballots		0	
Turnout		5,343	85.83
Registered electors		6,225	
Majority		612	12.03
This was a new constituency created.
