= 2022 British cabinet reshuffle =

The 2022 British cabinet reshuffle can refer to:

- July 2022 British cabinet reshuffle by the second Johnson ministry
- September 2022 appointment of ministers at the beginning of the Truss ministry
- October 2022 appointment of ministers at the beginning of the Sunak ministry

== See also ==
- 2022 cabinet reshuffle (disambiguation)
