= Sarikei (federal constituency) =

Federal constituency of Sarawak, Malaysia

Sarikei (P208)
Sarawak constituency

Federal constituency
- Legislature: Dewan Rakyat
- MP: Huang Tiong Sii; GPS
- Constituency created: 1968
- First contested: 1969
- Last contested: 2022

Demographics
- Population (2020): 43,119
- Electors (2022): 55,018
- Area (km²): 712
- Pop. density (per km²): 60.6

Sarikei is a federal constituency in Sarikei Division (Sarikei District & Meradong District), Sarawak, Malaysia, that has been represented in the Dewan Rakyat since 1971.

The federal constituency was created in the 1968 redistribution and is mandated to return a single member to the Dewan Rakyat under the first past the post voting system.

== Demographics ==
https://ge15.orientaldaily.com.my/seats/sarawak/p

Ethnic breakdown of Sarikei's electorate as of 2022
1. Chinese (60.7%)
2. Sarawak bumiputera (31.9%)
3. Malay-Muslim bumiputera (6.90%)
4. Other ethnicities (0.50%)

As of 2020, Sarikei has a population of 43,119 people.

Age breakdown of Sarikei's electorate as of 2022
1. 18–20 (5.54%)
2. 21–29 (19.4%)
3. 30–39 (20.3%)
4. 40–49 (17.6%)
5. 50–59 (16.1%)
6. 60–69 (12.2%)
7. 70–79 (6.15%)
8. 80–89 (2.17%)
9. above 90 (0.67%)
Gender breakdown of Sarikei's electorate as of 2022
1. Male (50.3%)
2. Female (49.7%)

== History ==
=== Polling districts ===
According to the gazette issued on 31 October 2022, the Sarikei constituency has a total of 20 polling districts.

State constituency	Polling Districts	Code	Location
Repok (N45)	Bulat	208/45/01	SK Selangan; SJK (C) Siung Hua Sg. Sebanyak; SJK (C) Bulat
Repok (N45)	Pantak	208/45/02	SMK Tinggi Sarikei
Repok (N45)	Repok	208/45/03	SMK Bandar Sarikei
Repok (N45)	Sarikei	208/45/04	SMK St. Anthony Sarikei
Repok (N45)	Merudu	208/45/05	SJK (C) Su Lok Merudu; SJK (C) Su Lee Sg Baji
Repok (N45)	Peninjau	208/45/06	SJK (C) Sze Lu; SJK (C) Tiong Ho
Repok (N45)	Paoh	208/45/07	SMK Sg. Paoh; SK St. Martin Sarikei
Repok (N45)	Nyelong Park	208/45/08	SK St. Anne Sarikei
Meradong (N46)	Narasit	208/46/01	SJK (C) Nang Hua Narasit
Meradong (N46)	Tulai	208/46/02	SK Tulai; SJK (C) Tong Hua Tulai
Meradong (N46)	Kertong	208/46/03	SK Sg. Kawi; SJK (C) Kung Cheng Mador; SJK (C) Yong Kwong Jln. Paradom Meradong
Meradong (N46)	Kelupu	208/46/04	SK Sg. Gemuan Jln Kelupu; SJK (C) Nan Chiew; SJK (C) Ming Tee
Meradong (N46)	Bandar	208/46/05	SJK (C) Kai Chung Bintangor; SMJK Kai Chung Bintangor; SK Bandar Bintangor
Meradong (N46)	Meradong	208/46/06	SJK (C) Ming Chiang Sg. Meradong
Meradong (N46)	Kemantan	208/46/07	SJK (C) Ming Lu; SJK (C) Tung Kwong Sg. Padi
Meradong (N46)	Mador	208/46/08	SJK (C) Sg. Mador; Tadika KEMAS Sg. Rayah; SJK (C) Kai Sing Sg. Labas
Meradong (N46)	Lemayong	208/46/09	SK Ulu Bintang; SK Ulu Strass; SK Ng. Strass; SJK (C) Min Daik
Meradong (N46)	Selemas	208/46/10	Balai Raya Kpg. Selemas; Tadika Methodist Bintangor Town
Meradong (N46)	Selidap	208/46/11	RH Regina Sg. Selidap; SK Tanah Puteh; SJK (C) Su Tak Selidap; SJK (C) Su Ming
Meradong (N46)	Nyelong	208/46/12	SK Sg. Petai; SK Rentap Baron; SJK (C) Hua Kee Kesa; SJK (C) Nam Kiew Sg. Kedup; SK Bukit Nibong

=== Representation history ===
Members of Parliament for Sarikei
Parliament	No	Years	Member	Party	Vote Share
Constituency created
		1969–1971	Parliament was suspended		
3rd	P132	1971–1973	Chen Ko Ming (陈高明)	SCA	4,041; 41.06%
3rd	P132	1973–1974	Chen Ko Ming (陈高明)	BN (SUPP)	4,041; 41.06%
4th	P142	1974–1978	Chieng Tiong Kai (詹长开)	BN (SUPP)	6,420; 68.34%
5th	P142	1978–1982	Chieng Tiong Kai (詹长开)	BN (SUPP)	7,760; 54.91%
6th	P142	1982–1986	Law Hieng Ding (刘贤镇)	BN (SUPP)	8,389; 48.42%
7th	P166	1986–1990	Law Hieng Ding (刘贤镇)	BN (SUPP)	10,589; 51.26%
8th	P168	1990–1995	Law Hieng Ding (刘贤镇)	BN (SUPP)	12,584; 61.22%
9th	P180	1995–1999	Law Hieng Ding (刘贤镇)	BN (SUPP)	Uncontested
10th	P181	1999–2004	Law Hieng Ding (刘贤镇)	BN (SUPP)	15,212; 65.41%
11th	P207	2004–2008	Law Hieng Ding (刘贤镇)	BN (SUPP)	15,485; 70.70%
12th	P208	2008–2013	Ding Kuong Hiing (陈冠勋)	BN (SUPP)	10,588; 48.37%
13th	P208	2013–2018	Wong Ling Biu (黄灵彪)	PR (DAP)	14,263; 50.90%
14th	P208	2018–2022	Wong Ling Biu (黄灵彪)	PH (DAP)	16,327; 53.57%
15th	P208	2022–present	Huang Tiong Sii (范长锡)	GPS (SUPP)	20,080; 55.07%

=== State constituency ===
Parliamentary constituency	State constituency					
Parliamentary constituency	1969–1978	1978–1990	1990–1999	1999–2008	2008–2016	2016–present
Sarikei	Kuala Rajang					
Sarikei		Meradong				
Sarikei	Repok					

=== Historical boundaries ===
State Constituency	Area					
State Constituency	1968	1977	1987	1996	2005	2015
Kuala Rajang	Balai; Belawai; Jakar; Sungai Paoh; Tanjung Manis					
Meradong		Bintangor; Kampung Penesu; Kampung Selemas; Kelupu; Meradong	Bintangor; Kampung Selemas; Kelupu; Kematan; Meradong		Bintangor; Kampung Menyelang; Kelupu; Meradong; Sungai Pasi	
Repok	Repok; Sarikei; Sungai Nyelong; Sungai Pasi; Sungai Rusa	Bayong; Bulat; Jakar; Sarikei; Sungai Pasi	Bulat; Jakar; Repok; Sarikei; Sungai Pasi		Bayor; Bulat; Jakar; Repok; Sarikei	

=== Current state assembly members ===
No.	State Constituency	Member	Party (coalition)
N45	Repok	Huang Tiong Sii	GPS (SUPP)
N46	Meradong	Diing Kuong Hiing	GPS (SUPP)

=== Local governments & postcodes ===
No.	State Constituency	Local Government	Postcode
N45	Repok	Sarikei District Council	96100 Sarikei; 96500 Bintangor
N46	Meradong	Sarikei District Council (Selidap and Nyelong areas); Maradong & Julau District Council	96100 Sarikei; 96500 Bintangor

== Election results ==
Malaysian general election, 2022
Party	Candidate	Votes	%	∆%
GPS	Huang Tiong Sii	20,080	55.07	▲55.07
DAP	Roderick Wong Siew Lead	16,383	44.93	▼8.64
Total valid votes		36,463	100.00	
Total rejected ballots		436		
Unreturned ballots		126		
Turnout		37,025	67.30	▼10.79
Registered electors		55,018		
Majority		3,697	10.14	▲1.71
GPS gain from PH		Swing		?
Source(s) https://lom.agc.gov.my/ilims/upload/portal/akta/outputp/1753265/PARLIMEN%20SARAWAK%20(PUB%20620).pdf

Malaysian general election, 2018
Party	Candidate	Votes	%	∆%
DAP	Wong Ling Biu	16,327	53.57	▲2.67
BN	Huang Tiong Sii	13,757	45.14	▼3.96
PBK	Wong Chin King	392	1.29	▲1.29
Total valid votes		30,476	100.00	
Total rejected ballots		340		
Unreturned ballots		79		
Turnout		30,895	78.09	▲0.51
Registered electors		39,561		
Majority		2,570	8.43	▲6.63
DAP hold		Swing		
Source(s) "His Majesty's Government Gazette – Notice of Contested Election, Parliament for the State of Sarawak [P.U. (B) 247/2018]" (PDF). Attorney General's Chambers of Malaysia. 3 May 2018. "Federal Government Gazette – Results of Contested Election and Statements of the Poll after the Official Addition of Votes, Parliamentary Constituencies for the State of Sarawak [P.U. (B) 321/2018]" (PDF). Attorney General's Chambers of Malaysia. 28 May 2018. Archived from the original (PDF) on 2019-12-29.

Malaysian general election, 2013
Party	Candidate	Votes	%	∆%
DAP	Wong Ling Biu	14,263	50.90	▲2.77
BN	Ding Kuong Hiing	13,758	49.10	▼0.73
Total valid votes		28,021	100.00	
Total rejected ballots		277		
Unreturned ballots		555		
Turnout		28,353	77.58	▲7.35
Registered electors		36,550		
Majority		505	1.80	▲1.56
DAP gain from BN		Swing		?
Source(s) "Federal Government Gazette – Notice of Contested Election, Parliament for the State of Sarawak [P.U. (B) 184/2013]" (PDF). Attorney General's Chambers of Malaysia. 26 April 2013. "Federal Government Gazette – Results of Contested Election and Statements of the Poll after the Official Addition of Votes, Parliamentary Constituencies for the State of Sarawak [P.U. (B) 225/2013]" (PDF). Attorney General's Chambers of Malaysia. 22 May 2013. Archived from the original (PDF) on 2018-09-30.

Malaysian general election, 2008
Party	Candidate	Votes	%	∆%
BN	Ding Kuong Hiing	10,588	48.37	▼22.33
DAP	Wong Hua Seh	10,537	48.13	▲48.13
Independent	Kung Chin Chin	545	2.49	▲2.49
Independent	Lau Kieng Chai	116	0.53	▲0.53
Independent	Ngu Tieng Hai	105	0.48	▲0.48
Total valid votes		21,891	100.00	
Total rejected ballots		176		
Unreturned ballots		179		
Turnout		22,246	70.23	▲8.43
Registered electors		31,675		
Majority		51	0.24	▼52.72
BN hold		Swing		

Malaysian general election, 2004
Party	Candidate	Votes	%	∆%
BN	Law Hieng Ding	15,485	70.70	▲5.29
Independent	Ngu Tieng Hai	3,886	17.74	▲17.74
Independent	Ling Bit Tiing	1,667	7.61	▲7.61
Independent	Junak Jawek	864	3.94	▲3.94
Total valid votes		21,902	100.00	
Total rejected ballots		237		
Unreturned ballots		34		
Turnout		22,173	61.80	▼8.52
Registered electors		35,880		
Majority		11,599	52.96	▲21.30
BN hold		Swing		

Malaysian general election, 1999
Party	Candidate	Votes	%	∆%
BN	Law Hieng Ding	15,212	65.41	▲65.41
DAP	Michael Tiang Ming Tee	7,849	33.75	▲33.75
Independent	Yii Chu Lik	197	0.85	▲0.85
Total valid votes		23,258	100.00	
Total rejected ballots		241		
Unreturned ballots		69		
Turnout		23,568	70.32	
Registered electors		35,513		
Majority		7,363	31.66	
BN hold		Swing		

Malaysian general election, 1995
Party	Candidate	Votes	%	∆%
On the nomination day, Law Hieng Ding won uncontested.
BN	Law Hieng Ding			
Total valid votes			100.00	
Total rejected ballots				
Unreturned ballots				
Turnout				
Registered electors		32,736		
Majority				
BN hold		Swing		

Total Elector count is from Tindak Malaysia's GitHub

Malaysian general election, 1990
Party	Candidate	Votes	%	∆%
BN	Law Hieng Ding	12,584	61.22	▲9.96
DAP	Chian Pao Koh	7,972	38.78	▼9.96
Total valid votes		20,556	100.00	
Total rejected ballots		243		
Unreturned ballots		0		
Turnout		20,799	73.45	▼2.72
Registered electors		28,316		
Majority		4,612	22.44	▲19.92
BN hold		Swing		

Malaysian general election, 1986
Party	Candidate	Votes	%	∆%
BN	Law Hieng Ding	10,589	51.26	▲2.84
DAP	Chong Siew Chiang	10,070	48.74	▲0.78
Total valid votes		20,659	100.00	
Total rejected ballots		214		
Unreturned ballots		0		
Turnout		20,873	76.17	▲0.05
Registered electors		27,403		
Majority		519	2.52	▲2.06
BN hold		Swing		

Malaysian general election, 1982
Party	Candidate	Votes	%	∆%
BN	Law Hieng Ding	8,389	48.42	▼6.49
DAP	Chong Siew Chiang	8,308	47.96	▲47.96
Independent	Nyandang Linang	449	2.59	▲2.59
Sarawak People's Organization	Ling Tung Lee	178	1.03	▲1.03
Total valid votes		17,324	100.00	
Total rejected ballots		255		
Unreturned ballots		0		
Turnout		17,579	76.12	
Registered electors		23,093		
Majority		81	0.46	▼9.36
BN hold		Swing		

Malaysian general election, 1978
Party	Candidate	Votes	%	∆%
BN	Chieng Tiong Kai	7,760	54.91	▼13.43
Independent	Chong Siew Chiang	6,372	45.09	▲45.09
Total valid votes		14,132	100.00	
Total rejected ballots		287		
Unreturned ballots		0		
Turnout		14,419	71.78	▼6.92
Registered electors		20,089		
Majority		1,388	9.82	▼26.86
BN hold		Swing		

Malaysian general election, 1974
Party	Candidate	Votes	%	∆%
BN	Chieng Tiong Kai	6,420	68.34	▲68.34
SNAP	Wong Siew Kwong	2,974	31.66	▲17.55
Total valid votes		9,394	100.00	
Total rejected ballots		440		
Unreturned ballots		0		
Turnout		9,834	78.70	▼8.38
Registered electors		12,496		
Majority		3,446	36.68	▲29.53
BN gain from SCA		Swing		?

Malaysian general election, 1969
Party	Candidate	Votes	%
SCA	Chen Ko Ming	4,041	41.06
SUPP	Lo Pek Ung	3,337	33.91
SNAP	Wong Yuk Feng	1,389	14.11
Independent	Then Kwan Long	960	9.76
Independent	Ching Ting Chiok	114	1.16
Total valid votes		9,841	100.00
Total rejected ballots		571	
Unreturned ballots		0	
Turnout		10,412	87.08
Registered electors		11,957	
Majority		704	7.15
This was a new constituency created.
