= Minister of Natural Resources and Environmental Sustainability =

Cabinet position in Malaysia

- Kementerian Sumber Asli dan Kelestarian Alam

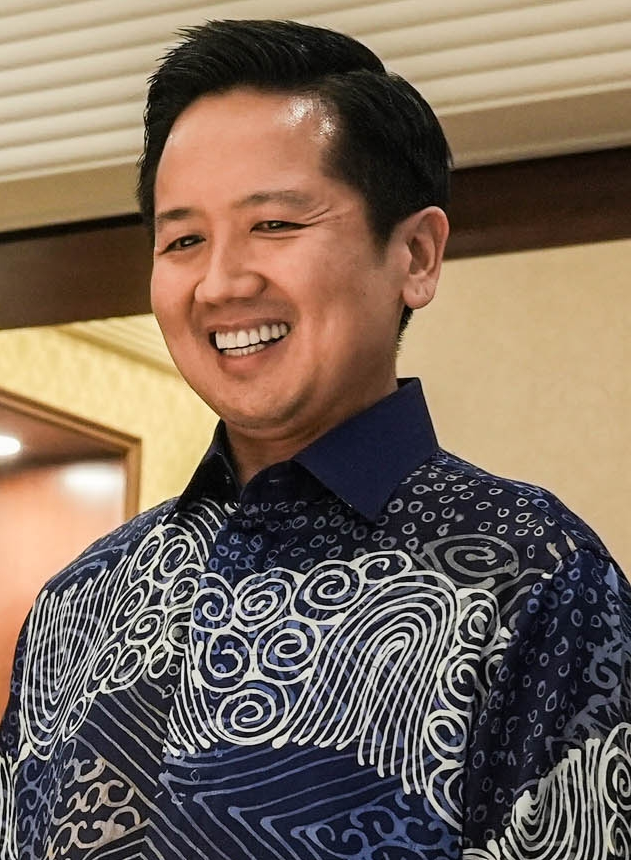
- Incumbent; Arthur Joseph Kurup since 17 December 2025
- Ministry of Natural Resources and Environmental Sustainability
- Style: Yang Berhormat Menteri (The Honourable Minister)
- Abbreviation: NRES
- Member of: Cabinet of Malaysia
- Reports to: Parliament of Malaysia
- Seat: Putrajaya
- Appointer: Yang di-Pertuan Agong on the recommendation of the Prime Minister of Malaysia
- Formation: 1955
- First holder: Ismail Abdul Rahman as Minister of Natural Resources
- Deputy: Syed Ibrahim Syed Noh
- Website: www.nrecc.gov.my

The Minister of Natural Resources and Environmental Sustainability (Malay: Kementerian Sumber Asli dan Kelestarian Alam) has been Arthur Joseph Kurup since 17 December 2025. The minister is deputised by the Deputy Minister of Natural Resources and Environmental Sustainability, Syed Ibrahim Syed Noh since 17 December 2025. The minister administers the portfolio through the Ministry of Natural Resources and Environmental Sustainability.

== List of ministers ==
=== Environment/environmental sustainability ===
The following individuals have been appointed Minister of Environment/Environmental Sustainability, or any of its precedent titles:

Political party: BN PH PN

Portrait	Name (Birth–Death) Constituency	Political party	Title	Took office	Left office	Deputy Minister	Prime Minister (Cabinet)
	Ong Kee Hui (1914–2000); MP for Bandar Kuching	BN (SUPP)	Minister of Local Government and Environment	1974	1976	Vacant	Abdul Razak Hussein (II)
	Ong Kee Hui (1914–2000); MP for Bandar Kuching	BN (SUPP)	Minister of Science, Technology and Environment	1976	30 April 1982	Abdullah Ahmad (1976–1978); Vacant (1978–1979); Clarence Elong Mansul (1979–1981); Vacant (1981–1982)	Mahathir Mohamad (I)
	Stephen Yong Kuet Tze (1921–2001); MP for Padawan	BN (SUPP)	Minister of Science, Technology and Environment	30 April 1982	26 October 1990	Vacant (1982–1987); Law Hieng Ding (1979–1980)	Mahathir Mohamad (II · III)
	Law Hieng Ding (1935–2018); MP for Sarikei	BN (SUPP)	Minister of Science, Technology and Environment	27 October 1990	26 March 2004	Peter Chin Fah Kui (1990–1995); Abu Bakar Daud (1995–1999); Zainal Dahlan (1999–2004)	Mahathir Mohamad (IV · V · VI); Abdullah Ahmad Badawi (I)
	Adenan Satem (1944-2017); MP for Batang Sadong	BN (PBB)	Minister of Natural Resources and Environment	27 March 2004	14 February 2006	S. Sothinathan	Abdullah Ahmad Badawi (II)
	Azmi Khalid (b. 1940); MP for Padang Besar	BN (UMNO)	Minister of Natural Resources and Environment	14 February 2006	18 March 2008	S. Sothinathan	Abdullah Ahmad Badawi (II)
	Douglas Uggah Embas (b. 1955); MP for Betong	BN (PBB)	Minister of Natural Resources and Environment	19 March 2008	15 May 2013	Maznah Mazlan (2008–2009); Joseph Kurup (2009–2013)	Abdullah Ahmad Badawi (III); Najib Razak (I)
	Palanivel Govindasamy (1949-2025); MP for Cameron Highlands	BN (MIC)	Minister of Natural Resources and Environment	16 May 2013	29 July 2015	James Dawos Mamit	Najib Razak (II)
	Wan Junaidi Tuanku Jaafar (b. 1946); MP for Santubong	BN (PBB)	Minister of Natural Resources and Environment	29 July 2015	9 May 2018	Hamim Samuri	Najib Razak (II)
	Yeo Bee Yin (b. 1983); MP for Bakri	PH (DAP)	Minister of Energy, Science, Technology, Environment and Climate Change	2 July 2018	24 February 2020	Isnaraissah Munirah Majilis	Mahathir Mohamad (VII)
	Tuan Ibrahim Tuan Man (b. 1960); MP for Kubang Kerian	PN (PAS)	Minister of Environment and Water	10 March 2020	24 November 2022	Mansor Othman (2020–2021); Ahmad Masrizal Muhammad (2021–2022)	Muhyiddin Yassin (I); Ismail Sabri Yaakob (I)
	Nik Nazmi Nik Ahmad (b. 1982); MP for Setiawangsa	PH (PKR)	Minister of Natural Resources, Environment and Climate Change	3 December 2022	12 December 2023	Huang Tiong Sii	Anwar Ibrahim (I)
	Nik Nazmi Nik Ahmad (b. 1982); MP for Setiawangsa	PH (PKR)	Minister of Natural Resources and Environmental Sustainability	12 December 2023	4 July 2025	Huang Tiong Sii	Anwar Ibrahim (I)
	Johari Abdul Ghani (b. 1964); MP for Titiwangsa; Acting	BN (UMNO)	Acting Minister of Natural Resources and Environmental Sustainability	11 July 2025	17 December 2025	Huang Tiong Sii	Anwar Ibrahim (I)
	Arthur Joseph Kurup (b. 1982); MP for Pensiangan	BN (PBRS)	Minister of Natural Resources and Environmental Sustainability	17 December 2025	Incumbent	Syed Ibrahim Syed Noh	Anwar Ibrahim (I)

=== Climate change ===
The following individuals have been appointed Minister of Climate Change, or any of its precedent titles:

Political party: PH

Portrait	Name (Birth–Death) Constituency	Political party	Title	Took office	Left office	Deputy Minister	Prime Minister (Cabinet)
	Yeo Bee Yin (b. 1983); MP for Bakri	PH (DAP)	Minister of Energy, Science, Technology, Environment and Climate Change	2 July 2018	24 February 2020	Isnaraissah Munirah Majilis	Mahathir Mohamad (VII)
	Nik Nazmi Nik Ahmad (b. 1982); MP for Setiawangsa	PH (PKR)	Minister of Natural Resources, Environment and Climate Change	3 December 2022	12 December 2023	Huang Tiong Sii	Anwar Ibrahim (I)

=== Natural resources ===
The following individuals have been appointed Minister of Natural Resources, or any of its precedent titles:

Political party: Alliance/BN PH PN

Portrait	Name (Birth–Death) Constituency	Political party	Title	Took office	Left office	Deputy Minister	Prime Minister (Cabinet)
	Ismail Abdul Rahman (1915–1973); MP for Johore Timor	Alliance (UMNO)	Minister of Natural Resources	1955	1957	Vacant	Chief Minister of the Federation of Malaya; Tunku Abdul Rahman
	Bahaman Samsudin (1906–1995); MP for Kuala Pilah	Alliance (UMNO)	Minister of Natural Resources	1957	1959	Vacant	Tunku Abdul Rahman (I)
	Adenan Satem (1944-2017); MP for Batang Sadong	BN (PBB)	Minister of Natural Resources and Environment	27 March 2004	14 February 2006	S. Sothinathan	Abdullah Ahmad Badawi (II)
	Azmi Khalid (b. 1940); MP for Padang Besar	BN (UMNO)	Minister of Natural Resources and Environment	14 February 2006	18 March 2008	S. Sothinathan	Abdullah Ahmad Badawi (II)
	Douglas Uggah Embas (b. 1955); MP for Betong	BN (PBB)	Minister of Natural Resources and Environment	19 March 2008	15 May 2013	Maznah Mazlan (2008–2009); Joseph Kurup (2009–2013)	Abdullah Ahmad Badawi (III); Najib Razak (I)
	Palanivel Govindasamy (1949-2025); MP for Cameron Highlands	BN (MIC)	Minister of Natural Resources and Environment	16 May 2013	29 July 2015	James Dawos Mamit	Najib Razak (II)
	Wan Junaidi Tuanku Jaafar (b. 1946); MP for Santubong	BN (PBB)	Minister of Natural Resources and Environment	29 July 2015	9 May 2018	Hamim Samuri	Najib Razak (II)
	Xavier Jayakumar Arulanandam (b. 1953); MP for Kuala Langat	PH (PKR)	Minister of Water, Land and Natural Resources	2 July 2018	24 February 2020	Tengku Zulpuri Shah Raja Puji	Mahathir Mohamad (VII)
	Dr. Shamsul Anuar Nasarah (b. 1967); MP for Lenggong	BN (UMNO)	Minister of Energy and Natural Resources	10 March 2020	3 August 2021	Ali Biju	Muhyiddin Yassin (I)
	Takiyuddin Hassan (b. 1961)MP for Kota Bharu	PN (PAS)	Minister of Energy and Natural Resources	30 August 2021	24 November 2022	Ali Biju	Ismail Sabri Yaakob (I)
	Nik Nazmi Nik Ahmad (b. 1982); MP for Setiawangsa	PH (PKR)	Minister of Natural Resources, Environment and Climate Change	3 December 2022	12 December 2023	Huang Tiong Sii	Anwar Ibrahim (I)
	Nik Nazmi Nik Ahmad (b. 1982); MP for Setiawangsa	PH (PKR)	Minister of Natural Resources and Environmental Sustainability	12 December 2023	4 July 2025	Huang Tiong Sii	Anwar Ibrahim (I)
	Johari Abdul Ghani (b. 1964); MP for Titiwangsa; Acting	BN (UMNO)	Acting Minister of Natural Resources and Environmental Sustainability	11 July 2025	17 December 2025	Huang Tiong Sii	Anwar Ibrahim (I)
	Arthur Joseph Kurup (b. 1982); MP for Pensiangan	BN (PBRS)	Minister of Natural Resources and Environmental Sustainability	17 December 2025	Incumbent	Syed Ibrahim Syed Noh	Anwar Ibrahim (I)

=== Land ===
The following individuals have been appointed Minister of Land, or any of its precedent titles:

Political party: Alliance/BN PH

Portrait	Name (Birth–Death) Constituency	Political party	Title	Took office	Left office	Deputy Minister	Prime Minister (Cabinet)
	Mohamed Ghazali Jawi (1924–1982); MP for Kuala Kangsar	Alliance (UMNO)	Minister of Agriculture and Land	1971	1973	Vacant	Abdul Razak Hussein (I)
	Asri Muda (1923–1992); MP for Nilam Puri	Alliance (PAS)	Minister of Lands Development	1973	1974	Vacant	Abdul Razak Hussein (I)
	Asri Muda (1923–1992); MP for Nilam Puri	BN (PAS)	Minister of Lands and Mines	1974	1976	Vacant	Abdul Razak Hussein (II)
	Asri Muda (1923–1992); MP for Nilam Puri	BN (PAS)	Minister of Lands and Regional Development	1976	1977	Sulaiman Daud	Hussein Onn (I)
	Abdul Kadir Yusuf (1917–1992); MP for Tenggaroh	BN (UMNO)	Minister of Lands and Regional Development	1977	1978	Vacant (1977–1978); Zainal Abidin Zin (1978–1980)	Hussein Onn (I · II)
	Shariff Ahmad (1952-2015); MP for Jerantut	BN (UMNO)	Minister of Lands and Regional Development	1978	30 April 1982	Sanusi Junid (1977–1978); Vacant (1981–1982)	Hussein Onn (II); Mahathir Mohamad (I)
	Rais Yatim (b. 1942); MP for Jelebu	BN (UMNO)	Minister of Lands and Regional Development	30 April 1982	16 July 1984	Vacant	Mahathir Mohamad (II)
	Mohd. Adib Mohd. Adam (1941-2022); MP for Alor Gajah	BN (UMNO)	Minister of Lands and Regional Development	16 July 1984	10 August 1986	Vacant	Mahathir Mohamad (II)
	Sulaiman Daud (1933–2010); MP for Santubong	BN (PBB)	Minister of Lands and Regional Development	11 August 1986	15 June 1989	Mohd Kassim Ahmed (1986–1987); Mohd Khalid Mohd Yunus (1987–1989)	Mahathir Mohamad (III)
	Kasitah Gaddam (b. 1947); MP for Kinabalu	BN (USNO)	Minister of Lands and Regional Development	15 June 1989	26 October 1990	Mohd Khalid Mohd Yunus	Mahathir Mohamad (III)
	Sakaran Dandai (1930-2021); MP for Semporna	BN (UMNO)	Minister of Lands and Co-operatives Development	27 October 1990	16 March 1994	Mohd. Khalid Mohd. Yunos	Mahathir Mohamad (IV)
	Osu Sukam (b. 1949); MP for Papar	BN (UMNO)	Minister of Lands and Co-operatives Development	21 August 1994	13 March 1999	Mohd. Khalid Mohd. Yunos (1994–1995); Goh Cheng Teik (1995–1999)	Mahathir Mohamad (IV · V)
	Kasitah Gaddam (b. 1947); Senator	BN (UMNO)	Minister of Lands and Co-operatives Development	14 March 1999	26 March 2004	Goh Cheng Teik (1995–1999); Tan Kee Kwong (1999–2004)	Mahathir Mohamad (V · VI); Abdullah Ahmad Badawi (I)
	Xavier Jayakumar Arulanandam (b. 1953); MP for Kuala Langat	PH (PKR)	Minister of Water, Land and Natural Resources	2 July 2018	24 February 2020	Tengku Zulpuri Shah Raja Puji	Mahathir Mohamad (VII)

== See also ==
- Minister of Energy, Science, Technology, Environment and Climate Change (Malaysia)
