= 2022 cabinet reshuffle =

2022 cabinet reshuffle may refer to:

- 2022 British cabinet reshuffle (disambiguation)
  - July 2022 British cabinet reshuffle
- 2022 Indonesian cabinet reshuffle
- 2022 Nigerian cabinet reshuffle
- 2022 Singaporean cabinet reshuffle
- Second Kishida Cabinet (First Reshuffle)

== See also ==
- 2021 cabinet reshuffle (disambiguation)
- 2023 cabinet reshuffle (disambiguation)
- July 2022 French government reshuffle
