= Minister of Plantation and Commodities (Malaysia) =

Minister in the Government of Malaysia

- Menteri Perladangan dan Komoditi

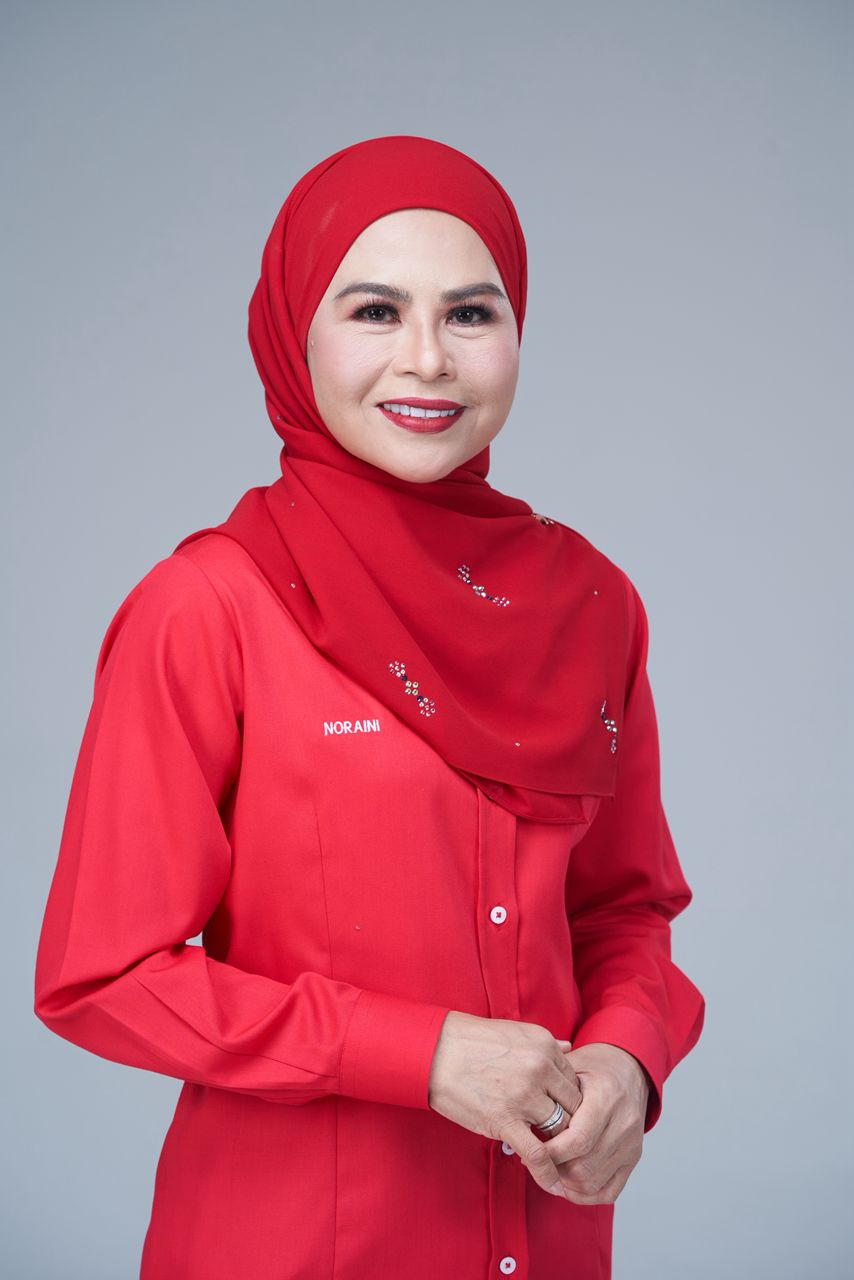
- Incumbent; Noraini Ahmad since 17 December 2025
- Ministry of Plantation and Commodities
- Style: Yang Berhormat Menteri (The Honourable Minister)
- Abbreviation: MPIC/KPK
- Member of: Cabinet
- Reports to: Parliament of Malaysia
- Appointer: Yang di-Pertuan Agong on the advice of the Prime Minister
- Formation: 1972
- First holder: Abdul Taib Mahmud
- Deputy: Huang Tiong Sii
- Website: www.mpic.gov.my

The Minister of Plantation and Commodities (Malay: Menteri Perladangan dan Komoditi; Jawi: منتري ڤرلاداڠن دان كومودتي), is a minister in the Government of Malaysia, with responsibility for the Ministry of Plantation and Commodities (MPIC).

The incumbent minister is Noraini Ahmad who was appointed by Anwar Ibrahim on 17 December 2025. She has been deputised by Huang Tiong Sii since 17 December 2025.

== List of ministers ==
=== Plantation industries and commodities/primary industries ===
The following individuals have been appointed as Minister of Plantation Industries and Commodities/Primary Industries, or any of its precedent titles.

Political party: Alliance/BN PH PN PBM GPS

Portrait	Name (Birth–Death) Constituency	Political party	Title	Took office	Left office	Deputy Minister	Prime Minister (Cabinet)
	Abdul Taib Mahmud (1936–2024); MP for Samarahan	BN (PBB)	Minister of Plantation Industries and Commodities	1972	1974	Paul Leong Khee Seong	Abdul Razak Hussein (I)
	Musa Hitam (b. 1934); MP for Labis	BN (UMNO)	Minister of Plantation Industries and Commodities	1974	1977	Bujang Ulis	Abdul Razak Hussein (II); Hussein Onn (I)
	Abdul Taib Mahmud (b. 1936); MP for Samarahan	BN (PBB)	Minister of Plantation Industries and Commodities	1977	1978	Bujang Ulis	Hussein Onn (I)
	Paul Leong Khee Seong (b. 1939); MP for Taiping	BN (Gerakan)	Minister of Plantation Industries and Commodities	1978	10 August 1986	Bujang Ulis (1978–1984); Megat Junid Megat Ayub (1984–1986)	Hussein Onn (II); Mahathir Mohamad (I · II)
	Lim Keng Yaik (1939–2012); MP for Beruas	BN (Gerakan)	Minister of Plantation Industries and Commodities	11 August 1986	26 March 2004	Mohd Radzi Sheikh Ahmad (1986–1987); Alias Md. Ali (1987–1990); Tengku Mahmud Tengku Mansor (1987–1990); Alias Md. Ali (1990–1995); Siti Zainaboon Abu Bakar (1995–1996); Hishammuddin Hussein (1996–1999); Anifah Aman (1999–2004)	Mahathir Mohamad (III · IV · V · VI); Abdullah Ahmad Badawi (I)
	Peter Chin Fah Kui (b. 1945); MP for Miri	BN (SUPP)	Minister of Plantation Industries and Commodities	27 March 2004	9 April 2009	Anifah Aman (2004–2008); A. Kohillan Pillay (2008–2009)	Abdullah Ahmad Badawi (II · III)
	Bernard Giluk Dompok (b. 1949); MP for Penampang	BN (UPKO)	Minister of Plantation Industries and Commodities	10 April 2009	15 May 2013	Hamzah Zainuddin (2009–2013); Palanivel Govindasamy (2010–2011)	Najib Razak (I)
	Douglas Uggah Embas (b. 1956); MP for Betong	BN (PBB)	Minister of Plantation Industries and Commodities	16 May 2013	12 May 2016	Noriah Kasnon (2013–2016); Vacant (2016)	Najib Razak (II)
	Nancy Shukri (b. 1961); MP for Batang Sadong; Acting	BN (PBB)	Acting Minister of Plantation Industries and Commodities	12 May 2016	27 June 2016	Vacant	Najib Razak (II)
	Mah Siew Keong (b. 1961); MP for Teluk Intan	BN (Gerakan)	Minister of Plantation Industries and Commodities	27 June 2016	9 May 2018	Datu Nasrun Datu Mansur	Najib Razak (II)
	Teresa Kok Suh Sim (b. 1964); MP for Seputeh	PH (DAP)	Minister of Primary Industries	2 July 2018	24 February 2020	Shamsul Iskandar Md Akin	Mahathir Mohamad (VII)
	Mohd Khairuddin Aman Razali (b. 1973); MP for Kuala Nerus	PN (PAS)	Minister of Plantation Industries and Commodities	10 March 2020	16 August 2021	Wee Jeck Seng; Willie Mongin	Muhyiddin Yassin (I)
	Zuraida Kamaruddin (b. 1958); MP for Ampang	PN (BERSATU)	Minister of Plantation Industries and Commodities	30 August 2021	26 May 2022	Wee Jeck Seng; Willie Mongin	Ismail Sabri Yaakob (I)
	Zuraida Kamaruddin (b. 1958); MP for Ampang	PBM	Minister of Plantation Industries and Commodities	26 May 2022	24 November 2022	Wee Jeck Seng; Willie Mongin	Ismail Sabri Yaakob (I)
	Fadillah Yusof (b. 1962) (Deputy Prime Minister); MP for Petra Jaya	GPS (PBB)	Minister of Plantation and Commodities	3 November 2022	12 December 2023	Siti Aminah Aching	Anwar Ibrahim (I)
	Johari Abdul Ghani (b. 1964); MP for Titiwangsa	BN (UMNO)	Minister of Plantation and Commodities	12 December 2023	17 December 2025	Chan Foong Hin	Anwar Ibrahim (I)
	Dr. Noraini Ahmad (b. 1967); MP for Parit Sulong	BN (UMNO)	Minister of Plantation and Commodities	17 December 2025	Incumbent	Huang Tiong Sii	Anwar Ibrahim (I)
