= Meradong (state constituency) =

Represented in the Sarawak State Legislative Assembly

Meradong (N46)
Sarawak constituency

State constituency
- Legislature: Sarawak State Legislative Assembly
MLA
Vacant
- Constituency created: 1977
- First contested: 1979
- Last contested: 2026

Meradong is a state constituency in Sarawak, Malaysia, that has been represented in the Sarawak State Legislative Assembly since 1979.

The state constituency was created in the 1977 redistribution and is mandated to return a single member to the Sarawak State Legislative Assembly under the first past the post voting system.

== Demographics ==
Ethnic breakdown of Meradong's electorate as of 2022
1. Chinese (50.9%)
2. Sarawak bumiputera (43.9%)
3. Malay-Muslim bumiputera (4.80%)
4. Other ethnicities (0.40%)

== History ==
As of 2020, Meradong has a population of 18,944 people.

=== Polling districts ===
According to the gazette issued on 31 October 2022, the Meradong constituency has a total of 12 polling districts.

State constituency	Polling Districts	Code	Location
Meradong (N46)	Narasit	208/46/01	SJK (C) Nang Hua Narasit
Meradong (N46)	Tulai	208/46/02	SK Tulai; SJK (C) Tong Hua Tulai
Meradong (N46)	Kertong	208/46/03	SK Sg. Kawi; SJK (C) Kung Cheng Mador; SJK (C) Yong Kwong Jln. Paradom Meradong
Meradong (N46)	Kelupu	208/46/04	SK Sg. Gemuan Jln Kelupu; SJK (C) Nan Chiew; SJK (C) Ming Tee
Meradong (N46)	Bandar	208/46/05	SJK (C) Kai Chung Bintangor; SMJK Kai Chung Bintangor; SK Bandar Bintangor
Meradong (N46)	Meradong	208/46/06	SJK (C) Ming Chiang Sg. Meradong
Meradong (N46)	Kemantan	208/46/07	SJK (C) Ming Lu; SJK (C) Tung Kwong Sg. Padi
Meradong (N46)	Mador	208/46/08	SJK (C) Sg. Mador; Tadika KEMAS Sg. Rayah; SJK (C) Kai Sing Sg. Labas
Meradong (N46)	Lemayong	208/46/09	SK Ulu Bintang; SK Ulu Strass; SK Ng. Strass; SJK (C) Min Daik
Meradong (N46)	Selemas	208/46/10	Balai Raya Kpg. Selemas; Tadika Methodist Bintangor Town
Meradong (N46)	Selidap	208/46/11	RH Regina Sg. Selidap; SK Tanah Puteh; SJK (C) Su Tak Selidap; SJK (C) Su Ming
Meradong (N46)	Nyelong	208/46/12	SK Sg. Petai; SK Rentap Baron; SJK (C) Hua Kee Kesa; SJK (C) Nam Kiew Sg. Kedup; SK Bukit Nibong

=== Representation history ===
Members of the Legislative Assembly for Meradong
Assembly	No	Years	Member	Party
Constituency created from Binatang
10th	N26	1979–1983	Anthony Teo Tiao Gin (張兆仁)	BN (SUPP)
11th	N26	1983–1987	Thomas Hii King Hiong (許慶軒)	BN (SUPP)
12th	N26	1987–1991	Thomas Hii King Hiong (許慶軒)	BN (SUPP)
13th	N31	1991–1996	Thomas Hii King Hiong (許慶軒)	BN (SUPP)
14th	N33	1996–2001	Yii Chu Lik (余自立)	Independent
15th	N33	2001–2006	Ting Check Sii (陳則賜)	BN (SUPP)
16th	N40	2006–2011	Ting Tze Fui (陳籽橞)	PR (DAP)
17th	N40	2011–2016	Ting Tze Fui (陳籽橞)	PR (DAP)
18th	N46	2016–2018	Ding Kuong Hiing (陳冠勛)	BN (SUPP)
18th	N46	2018-2021	Ding Kuong Hiing (陳冠勛)	GPS (SUPP)
19th	N46	2021–2026	Ding Kuong Hiing (陳冠勛)	GPS (SUPP)

== Election results ==
Sarawak state election, 2026
Party	Candidate	Votes	%	∆%
GPS				▲
PH				▲
Total valid votes				
Total rejected ballots				
Unreturned ballots				
Turnout				
Registered electors				
Majority				

Sarawak state election, 2021
Party	Candidate	Votes	%	∆%
GPS	Ding Kuong Hiing	6,827	58.24	▲58.24
PSB	Chris Hii Ru Yee	3,465	29.56	▲29.56
DAP	Yong Siew Wei	809	6.90	▼36.89
PBK	Moh Hiong King	622	5.31	▲5.31
Total valid votes		11,723	100.00	
Total rejected ballots		182		
Unreturned ballots		34		
Turnout		11,939	65.76	▼7.77
Registered electors		18,156		
Majority		3,362	28.68	▲16.27
GPS gain from BN		Swing		?
Source(s) https://lom.agc.gov.my/ilims/upload/portal/akta/outputp/1718688/PUB687.pdf

Sarawak state election, 2016
Party	Candidate	Votes	%	∆%
BN	Ding Kuong Hiing	6,865	56.21	▲18.33
DAP	Ting Tze Fui	5,349	43.79	▼18.33
Total valid votes		12,214	100.00	
Total rejected ballots		165		
Unreturned ballots		34		
Turnout		12,413	73.53	▲0.47
Registered electors		16,882		
Majority		1,516	12.41	▼11.84
BN gain from DAP		Swing		?
Source(s) "Federal Government Gazette - Notice of Contested Election, State Legislative Assembly of the State of Sarawak [P.U. (B) 190/2016]" (PDF). Attorney General's Chambers of Malaysia. 25 April 2016. Archived from the original (PDF) on 12 June 2017. "Senarai Calon yang Disahkan Layak Bertanding Pilihan Raya Dewan Undangan Negeri ke-11". Election Commission of Malaysia. 25 April 2016. Archived from the original on 25 April 2016.

Sarawak state election, 2011
Party	Candidate	Votes	%	∆%
DAP	Ting Tze Fui	6,884	62.12	▲0.31
BN	Ling Kie King	4,197	37.88	▲12.99
Total valid votes		11,081	100.00	
Total rejected ballots		107		
Unreturned ballots		17		
Turnout		11,205	73.06	▲6.05
Registered electors		15,337		
Majority		2,687	24.25	▼12.66
DAP hold		Swing		
Source(s) "Federal Government Gazette - Results of Contested Election and Statements of the Poll after the Official Addition of Votes Sarawak [P.U. (B) 245/2011]" (PDF). Attorney General's Chambers of Malaysia. 29 April 2011.

Sarawak state election, 2006
Party	Candidate	Votes	%	∆%
DAP	Ting Tze Fui	5,990	61.81	▲28.03
BN	Wong Zee Yeng	2,412	24.89	▼41.33
Independent	Wong Kung Kuong	603	6.22	▲6.22
Independent	David Tiong Chiong Chu	569	5.87	▲5.87
Independent	Junak Jawek	117	1.21	▲1.21
Total valid votes		9,691	100.00	
Total rejected ballots		76		
Unreturned ballots		6		
Turnout		9,773	67.01	▼4.87
Registered electors		14,584		
Majority		3,578	36.92	▲4.48
DAP gain from BN		Swing		?

Sarawak state election, 2001
Party	Candidate	Votes	%	∆%
BN	Ting Check Sii	7,391	66.22	▲23.37
DAP	Yek Sie Ping	3,770	33.78	▲33.78
Total valid votes		11,161	100.00	
Total rejected ballots		101		
Unreturned ballots		7		
Turnout		11,269	71.88	▼0.47
Registered electors		15,678		
Majority		3,621	32.44	▲19.79
BN gain from Independent		Swing		?

Sarawak state election, 1996
Party	Candidate	Votes	%	∆%
Independent	Yii Chu Lik	5,520	55.49	▲55.49
BN	Thomas Hii King Hiong	4,262	42.85	▼16.52
Independent	William Migu	133	1.34	▲1.34
Independent	Chan Ng Chai	32	0.32	▲0.32
Total valid votes		9,947	100.00	
Total rejected ballots		122		
Unreturned ballots		24		
Turnout		10,093	72.35	▲0.82
Registered electors		13,951		
Majority		1,258	12.65	▼8.42
Independent gain from BN		Swing		?

Sarawak state election, 1991
Party	Candidate	Votes	%	∆%
BN	Thomas Hii King Hiong	5,368	59.37	▲2.86
PBDS	Sim Lai Ann	3,463	38.30	▲38.30
NEGARA	Wailem Mohd Sidek Kumung	211	2.33	▲2.33
Total valid votes		9,042	100.00	
Total rejected ballots		84		
Unreturned ballots		10		
Turnout		9,136	71.53	▼2.87
Registered electors		12,773		
Majority		1,905	21.07	▲8.06
BN hold		Swing		

Sarawak state election, 1987
Party	Candidate	Votes	%	∆%
BN	Thomas Hii King Hiong	5,371	56.51	▲13.87
DAP	Chong Siew Chiang	4,134	43.49	▲20.33
Total valid votes		9,505	100.00	
Total rejected ballots		107		
Unreturned ballots		0		
Turnout		9,612	74.40	▼3.19
Registered electors		12,919		
Majority		1,237	13.01	▲3.10
BN hold		Swing		

Sarawak state election, 1983
Party	Candidate	Votes	%	∆%
BN	Thomas Hii King Hiong	3,857	42.64	▲2.49
Independent	Joseph Salang Gandum	2,960	32.72	▲32.72
DAP	Ting Yii Hiep	2,095	23.16	▼4.93
Independent	Wan Zainal Abidin Wan Kassim	101	1.12	▲1.12
Independent	Teo Siang Hai	33	0.36	▼23.15
Total valid votes		9,046	100.00	
Total rejected ballots		96		
Unreturned ballots		0		
Turnout		9,142	77.82	▲2.86
Registered electors		11,748		
Majority		897	9.92	▼2.14
BN hold		Swing		

Sarawak state election, 1979
Party	Candidate	Votes	%
BN	Anthony Teo Tiao Gin	3,126	40.15
DAP	Tang Ling Tung	2,187	28.09
Independent	Teo Siang Hai	1,831	23.51
Independent	Robinson Nyenggau Nanang	449	5.77
Independent	Mohd Zain Su'ip	194	2.49
Total valid votes		7,787	100.00
Total rejected ballots		102	
Unreturned ballots		0	
Turnout		7,889	74.95
Registered electors		10,526	
Majority		939	12.06
This was a new constituency created.
