= Ding Kuong Hiing =

Malaysian politician

Yang Berhormat Datuk Ding Kuong Hiing PJN MLA
- 陈冠勋

Faction represented in Dewan Rakyat
- 2008–2013: Barisan Nasional

Faction represented in Sarawak State Legislative Assembly
- 2016–2018: Barisan Nasional
- 2018–: Gabungan Parti Sarawak

Personal details
- Born: 20 January 1955 (age 71) Sibu, Crown Colony of Sarawak (now Sarawak, Malaysia)
- Party: Sarawak United Peoples' Party (SUPP)
- Other political affiliations: Barisan Nasional (BN) (until 2018); Gabungan Parti Sarawak (GPS) (since 2018)
- Education: University of Liverpool (BEng)
- Occupation: Politician
- Profession: Engineer

Datuk Ding Kuong Hiing (simplified Chinese: 陈冠勋; traditional Chinese: 陳冠勛; pinyin: Chén Guānxūn; born 20 January 1955) is a Malaysian politician who has served as Member of the Sarawak State Legislative Assembly (MLA) for Meradong since May 2016. Previously, he was the Member of the Parliament of Malaysia (MP) for Sarikei from March 2008 to May 2013.

== Political career ==
Ding was elected to Parliament in the 2008 election. After defeating his opponent from the Democratic Action Party (DAP) by 51 votes, he survived a legal challenge to the election in the Election Court, and an appeal to the Federal Court. Before his election, Ding was a staffer to the Chief Minister of Sarawak. In the 2013 election, Ding lost the seat to the DAP's Andrew Wong Ling Biu by 505 votes.

== Personal life ==
Ding is an engineer by profession and is married with two children.

== Election results ==
Parliament of Malaysia
Year	Constituency	Winner	Votes	Pct	Opponent(s)	Votes	Pct	Ballots cast	Majority	Turnout
2008	P208 Sarikei	Ding Kuong Hiing (SUPP)	10,588	48.37%	Wong Hua Seh (DAP)	10,537	48.13%	22,246	51	70.23%
2008	P208 Sarikei	Ding Kuong Hiing (SUPP)	10,588	48.37%	Kung Chin Chin (IND)	545	2.49%	22,246	51	70.23%
2008	P208 Sarikei	Ding Kuong Hiing (SUPP)	10,588	48.37%	Lau Kieng Chai (IND)	116	0.53%	22,246	51	70.23%
2008	P208 Sarikei	Ding Kuong Hiing (SUPP)	10,588	48.37%	Ngu Tieng Hai (IND)	105	0.48%	22,246	51	70.23%
2013	P208 Sarikei	Ding Kuong Hiing (SUPP)	13,758	49.10%	Andrew Wong Ling Biu (DAP)	14,263	50.90%	28,353	505	77.60%

Sarawak State Legislative Assembly
Year	Constituency	Winner	Votes	Pct	Opponent(s)	Votes	Pct	Ballots cast	Majority	Turnout
2016	N46 Meradong	Ding Kuong Hiing (SUPP)	6,865	56.21%	Ting Tze Fui (DAP)	5,349	43.79%	12,413	1,516	73.50%
2021	N46 Meradong	Ding Kuong Hiing (SUPP)	6,827	58.24%	Hii Ru Yee (PSB)	3,465	29.56%	11,939	3,362	65.76%
2021	N46 Meradong	Ding Kuong Hiing (SUPP)	6,827	58.24%	Yong Siew Wei (DAP)	809	6.90%	11,939	3,362	65.76%
2021	N46 Meradong	Ding Kuong Hiing (SUPP)	6,827	58.24%	Moh Hiong King (PBK)	622	5.31%	11,939	3,362	65.76%

== Honours ==
- Malaysia
  - Commander of the Order of Meritorious Service (PJN) – Datuk (2016)
