= Noraini Ahmad =

Malaysian politician

Yang Berhormat Datuk Seri Dr. Noraini Ahmad DGSM DSAP DMSM MP
- نورعيني أحمد
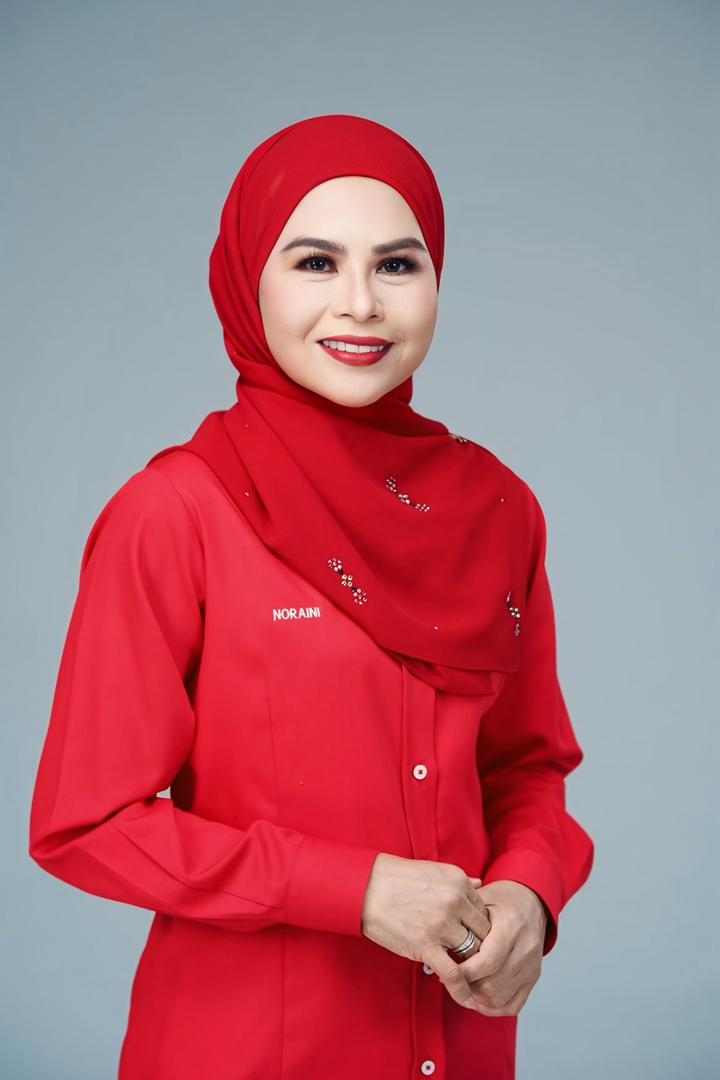

Minister of Plantation and Commodities
- Incumbent
- Assumed office 17 December 2025
- Monarch: Ibrahim Iskandar
- Prime Minister: Anwar Ibrahim
- Deputy: Huang Tiong Sii
- Preceded by: Johari Abdul Ghani
- Constituency: Parit Sulong

Deputy Minister of Women, Family and Community Development
- In office 12 December 2023 – 17 December 2025
- Monarchs: Abdullah (2023–2024); Ibrahim Iskandar (2024–2025)
- Prime Minister: Anwar Ibrahim
- Minister: Nancy Shukri
- Preceded by: Aiman Athirah Sabu
- Succeeded by: Lim Hui Ying
- Constituency: Parit Sulong

Chairperson of the Rubber Industry Smallholders Development Authority
- In office 26 March 2023 – 31 January 2024
- Minister: Ahmad Zahid Hamidi
- Director General: Abdullah Zainal
- Preceded by: Salim Sharif
- Succeeded by: Manndzri Nasib

Minister of Higher Education
- In office 30 August 2021 – 24 November 2022
- Monarch: Abdullah
- Prime Minister: Ismail Sabri Yaakob
- Deputy: Ahmad Masrizal Muhammad
- Preceded by: Herself
- Succeeded by: Mohamed Khaled Nordin
- In office 10 March 2020 – 6 August 2021
- Monarch: Abdullah
- Prime Minister: Muhyiddin Yassin
- Deputy: Mansor Othman
- Preceded by: Mahathir Mohamad (Acting Minister of Education)
- Succeeded by: Herself
- Constituency: Parit Sulong

Deputy Minister of Human Resources
- In office 19 March 2008 – 9 April 2009
- Monarch: Mizan Zainal Abidin
- Prime Minister: Abdullah Ahmad Badawi (2008–2009); Najib Razak (2009)
- Minister: Subramaniam Sathasivam
- Preceded by: Abdul Rahman Bakar
- Succeeded by: Maznah Mazlan
- Constituency: Parit Sulong

Chairperson of the Public Accounts Committee
- In office 11 April 2019 – 10 March 2020
- Nominated by: Mahathir Mohamad
- Appointed by: Mohamad Ariff Md Yusof
- Deputy: Wong Kah Woh
- Preceded by: Ronald Kiandee
- Succeeded by: Wong Kah Woh
- Constituency: Parit Sulong

Second Deputy President and 10th Women Chief of the United Malays National Organisation
- Incumbent
- Assumed office 24 June 2018
- President: Ahmad Zahid Hamidi
- Deputy: Norliza Abdul Rahim
- Preceded by: Shahrizat Abdul Jalil

2nd Women Youth Chief of the United Malays National Organisation
- In office 2004–2009
- President: Abdullah Ahmad Badawi
- Deputy: Rosnah Shirlin
- Preceded by: Azalina Othman Said
- Succeeded by: Rosnah Shirlin

Member of the Malaysian Parliament for Parit Sulong
- Incumbent
- Assumed office 8 March 2008
- Preceded by: Syed Hood Syed Edros (BN–UMNO)
- Majority: 13,599 (2008); 11,753 (2013); 6,341 (2018); 2,021 (2022)

Faction represented in Dewan Rakyat
- 2008–: Barisan Nasional

Other Positions
- 2013–2018: Chairperson of Malaysia External Trade Development Corporation
- 2017–2019: Chairperson of Commonwealth Women Parliamentarian (CWP)
- 2017–2019: Member of the Committee of Commonwealth Parliamentarian Association
- 2018–: Honorary Secretary of the Commonwealth Parliamentarian Association of Malaysia

Personal details
- Born: Noraini binti Ahmad; 7 November 1967 (age 58) Kampung Bintang, Batu Pahat, Johor, Malaysia
- Citizenship: Malaysia
- Party: United Malays National Organisation (UMNO) (since 1985)
- Other political affiliations: Barisan Nasional (BN) (since 1985)
- Spouse: Mohamed Jauzi Abdul Razak
- Children: 2
- Education: University of Saskatchewan (BComm); Universiti Tun Abdul Razak (MBA); Universiti Utara Malaysia (PhD); Asia e University (DBA)
- Occupation: Politician
- Noraini Ahmad on Facebook; Noraini Ahmad on Parliament of Malaysia

Noraini binti Ahmad (Jawi: نورعيني بنت أحمد; born 7 November 1967) is a Malaysian politician who has served as Minister of Plantation and Commodities in the Unity Government administration under Prime Minister Anwar Ibrahim since December 2025 and the Member of Parliament (MP) for Parit Sulong since March 2008. She served as the Deputy Minister of Women, Family and Community Development in the Unity Government administration under Prime Minister Anwar and Minister Nancy Shukri from December 2023 to her re-promotion in December 2025, Minister of Higher Education for the second term under the Barisan Nasional (BN) administration under former Prime Minister Ismail Sabri Yaakob from August 2021 to the collapse of BN administration in November 2022 and the first term in the Perikatan Nasional (PN) administration under former Prime Minister Muhyiddin Yassin from March 2020 to her resignation in August 2021. She is a member of the United Malays National Organisation (UMNO), a component party of the BN coalition. She has also served as the 10th Women Chief of UMNO since June 2018, 2nd Women Youth Chief of UMNO from 2004 to 2009 and 1st Deputy Women Youth Chief from 2001 to her promotion to Women Youth Chief in 2004. She is formerly a Chairperson of the Rubber Industry Smallholders Development Authority (RISDA) from March 2023 to January 2024. She is also the first PAC Chairwoman in Malaysian history. Her appointment as a Deputy Minister in the 2023 cabinet reshuffle is a rare occurrence in Malaysian politics since she was a former federal minister in the Muhyiddin cabinet and Ismail Sabri cabinet. She is one of the three deputy ministers who were previously a federal minister alongside Shamsul Anuar Nasarah and M. Kulasegaran.

== Early life and education ==
She is a graduate of the University of Saskatchewan, Saskatoon, Canada where she obtained her Bachelor of Commerce (double major in Quantitative Analysis and Finance) in 1991, followed by a Master's Degree in Business Administration (MBA) from Universiti Tun Abdul Razak (UNIRAZAK) in 2005. She subsequently obtained her Doctor of Philosophy (PhD) in Development Management from Universiti Utara Malaysia (UUM) in 2016. She then enrolled into the Doctor of Business Administration (DBA) programme at Asia e-University (AeU). The title of her DBA dissertation is "The Phenomenological Study of Women Entrepreneurs and their Impact on Socio-Economic Growth in Malaysia". She will be one of the first Malaysians to complete the DBA in AeU via the APEL Q system. She completed her viva on 11 November 2021 and received positive feedback on her dissertation from examiners who requested no further amendments/corrections upon submission. She completed her second PhD in April 2022.

== Political career ==
Noraini was first elected to federal Parliament in the 2008 general election, replacing incumbent Syed Hood Syed Edros. Immediately after the election, she was named Deputy Minister of Human Resources in the government of Abdullah Ahmad Badawi and served under the post until Abdullah's successor Najib Razak named his first cabinet in April 2009.

In the 2013 general election, Noraini won re-election to Parliament and was then appointed by the government as the Chairperson of the Malaysia External Trade Development Corporation (MATRADE). In the 2018 general election, she was re-elected once again albeit with a decreased majority.

Noraini was also the chairman of Commonwealth Women Parliamentarians from 2016 to 2019. The Commonwealth Women Parliamentarians (CWP) is a network of the Commonwealth Parliamentary Association that campaigns for gender equality and equal representation in Parliaments. On the international fora she became the first Malaysian to be elected as chairman of Commonwealth Women Parliamentarians (CWP) from 2016 to 2019. She was elected through voting at the 62nd Commonwealth Parliamentarians' Conference in London, United Kingdom. She garnered 53 votes beating Joyce Watson of Wales who received 15 votes, Poto Williams of New Zealand (10 votes) and Linda Reid from Canada who received 9 votes.

== Election results ==
Parliament of Malaysia
Year	Constituency	Candidate	Votes	Pct	Opponent(s)	Votes	Pct	Ballots cast	Majority	Turnout
2008	P147 Parit Sulong	Noraini Ahmad (UMNO)	26,066	67.65%	Faizal Ali (PAS)	12,167	32.35%	39,637	13,599	78.90%
2013	P147 Parit Sulong	Noraini Ahmad (UMNO)	30,258	62.05%	Khairuddin Abdul Rahim (PAS)	18,505	37.95%	49,855	11,753	87.62%
2018	P147 Parit Sulong	Noraini Ahmad (UMNO)	24,481	49.19%	Anis Afida Mohd Azli (AMANAH)	18,140	36.45%	50,778	6,341	85.19%
2018	P147 Parit Sulong	Noraini Ahmad (UMNO)	24,481	49.19%	Ahmad Rosdi Bahari (PAS)	7,148	14.36%	50,778	6,341	85.19%
2022	P147 Parit Sulong	Noraini Ahmad (UMNO)	25,740	40.89%	Abdul Karim Deraman (PAS)	23,719	37.68%	62,954	2,021	79.20%
2022	P147 Parit Sulong	Noraini Ahmad (UMNO)	25,740	40.89%	Mohd Faizal Dolah (AMANAH)	13,495	21.44%	62,954	2,021	79.20%

== Honours ==
=== Honours of Malaysia ===
- Malaysia
  - Recipient of the 17th Yang di-Pertuan Agong Installation Medal (2024)
- Malacca
  - Grand Commander of the Exalted Order of Malacca (DGSM) – Datuk Seri (2020)
  - Companion Class I of the Exalted Order of Malacca (DMSM) – Datuk (2005)
- Pahang
  - Knight Companion of the Order of Sultan Ahmad Shah of Pahang (DSAP) – Dato' (2005)

=== Honorary degrees ===
- Indonesia
  - Honorary Ph.D. degree in Management and Leadership from Indonesian Muslim University (2022)

=== Others ===
- 21st Century Partnership Program from Japanese Government - (2005)
- New Zealand's Prime Minister ASEAN Fellowship - (2005)
- Chosen as 1990s' 10 People 10 Decades University of Saskatchewan - (2017)
- Fellow of the Chartered Management Institute (FCMI), United Kingdom through the AeU–CMI partnership, in recognition of her leadership and contributions in strategic management - (2025)

== Publications and appearances ==
- A Change in Narrative to Break the Bias – BERNAMA & The Malaysia Reserve, 2022
- Let's Call Out Gender Bias Daily - New Straits Times, 2022
- Pushing Education for Sustainable Development to Greater Heights - New Straits Times, 2022
- Sustainable Higher Education in Malaysia – BERNAMA, 2022
- Appreciating Our Language, Our Cultural Heritage - The Malaysia Reserve, 2021
- Honouring Higher Education Educators - The Star, 2021
- Where Ideas Become Reality - New Straits Times, 2021
- Students Rise by Lifting Others - Free Malaysia Today, 2021
- Varsities Develop Future Leaders - New Straits Times, 2021
- Celebrating the Success of Women in Higher Education - The Star, 2021
- Simplifying Accommodation Search - New Straits Times, 2021
- PENJANA KPT-CAP to Boost Graduate Employability - New Straits Times, 2020
- Speech at the opening of the CWP Conference - The Parliamentarian, 2019
- The Commonwealth: Adding political value to global affairs in the 21st century - The Parliamentarian, 2019
- Women's Suffrage: A prerequisite to the gender equality agenda - The Parliamentarian, 2019
- Cyber Harassment Against Woman on Social Media - The Parliamentarian, 2019
- Economic Rights for Women - The Parliamentarian, 2018
- View from the CWP Chairperson - Women and democracy in Malaysia - The Parliamentarian, 2018
- If we want genuine positive change in the world, we need more women leaders. How can we persuade the word that the future is dependent on gender equality? - The Parliamentarian, 2017
- Women and Disabilities - The Parliamentarian, 2017
- Networking between Parliaments and creating alliances - The Parliamentarian, 2017
- Job creation and growth: solutions to inequality - The Parliamentarian, 2017
- Parliamentary Conference on the WTO - The Parliamentarian, 2017

== See also ==
- Parit Sulong (federal constituency)
