= Minister of Higher Education (Malaysia) =

Minister position in Malaysia

- Menteri Pendidikan Tinggi

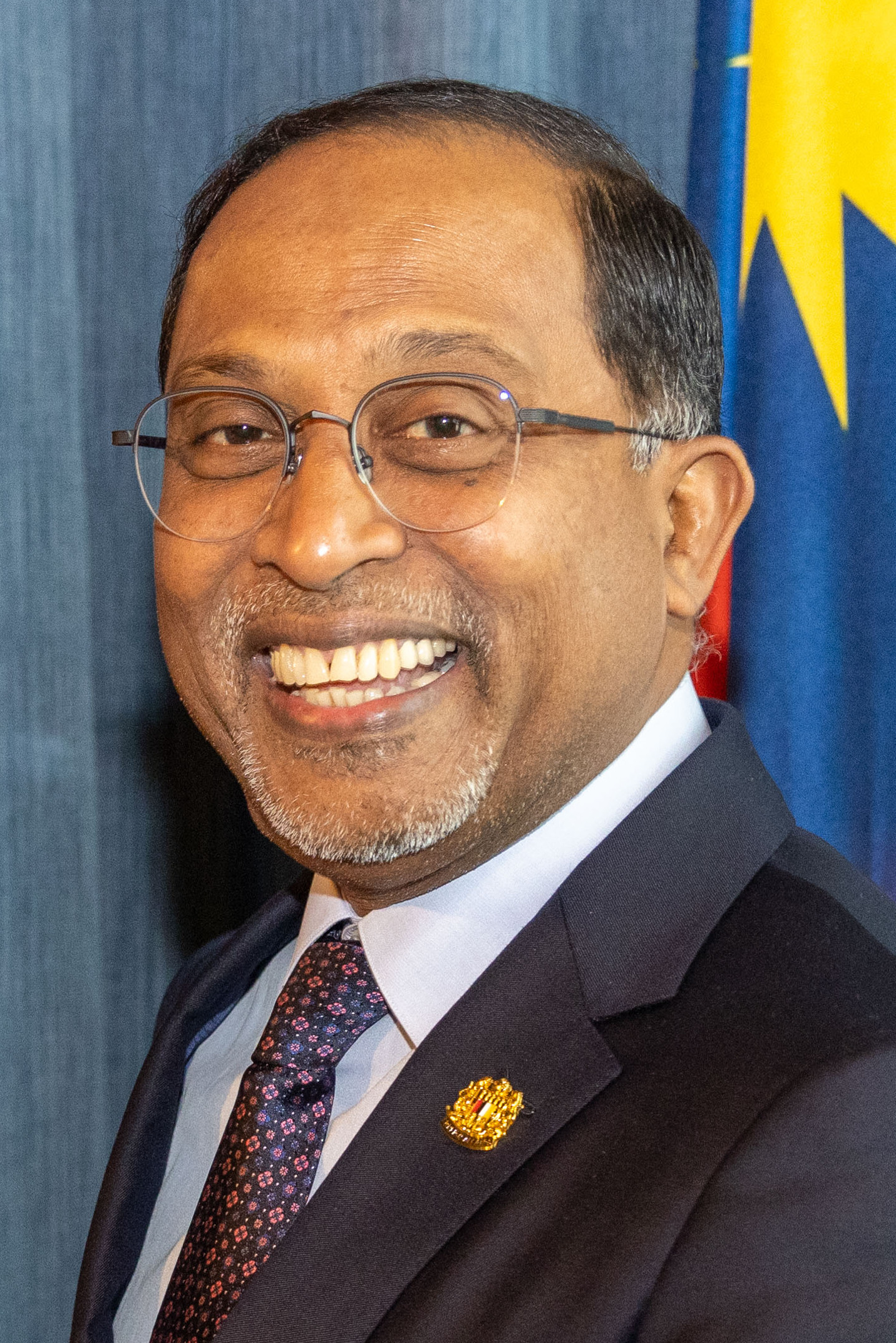
- Incumbent; Zambry Abdul Kadir since 12 December 2023
- Ministry of Higher Education
- Style: Yang Berhormat Menteri (The Honourable Minister)
- Abbreviation: MOHE/KPT
- Member of: Cabinet of Malaysia
- Reports to: Parliament of Malaysia
- Seat: Putrajaya
- Appointer: Yang di-Pertuan Agong on the recommendation of the Prime Minister of Malaysia
- Formation: 2004
- First holder: Shafie Salleh
- Website: www.mohe.gov.my

The current Malaysian Minister of Higher Education has been Zambry Abdul Kadir since 12 December 2023. The minister is deputised by the Deputy Minister of Higher Education. The minister administers the portfolio through the Ministry of Higher Education.

== List of ministers of higher education ==
The following individuals have been appointed as Minister of Higher Education, or any of its precedent titles:

Political party: BN

Portrait	Name (Birth–Death) Constituency	Political party	Title	Took office	Left office	Deputy Minister	Prime Minister (Cabinet)
	Shafie Salleh (1946–2019); MP for Kuala Langat	BN (UMNO)	Minister of Higher Education	27 March 2004	14 February 2006	Fu Ah Kiow	Abdullah Ahmad Badawi (II)
	Mustapa Mohamed (b. 1950); MP for Jeli	BN (UMNO)	Minister of Higher Education	14 February 2006	18 March 2008	Ong Tee Keat	Abdullah Ahmad Badawi (II)
	Mohamed Khaled Nordin (b. 1958); MP for Pasir Gudang	BN (UMNO)	Minister of Higher Education	19 March 2008	15 May 2013	Idris Haron (2008–2009); Saifuddin Abdullah (2009–2013); Hou Kok Chung (2008–2013)	Abdullah Ahmad Badawi (III); Najib Razak (I)
	Idris Jusoh (b. 1955); MP for Besut	BN (UMNO)	Minister of Higher Education	29 July 2015	9 May 2018	Mary Yap	Najib Razak (II)
	Dr. Noraini Ahmad (b. 1967); MP for Parit Sulong	BN (UMNO)	Minister of Higher Education	10 March 2020	6 August 2021	Ahmad Masrizal Muhammad	Muhyiddin Yassin (I)
	Dr. Noraini Ahmad (b. 1967); MP for Parit Sulong	BN (UMNO)	Minister of Higher Education	30 August 2021	24 November 2022	Mansor Othman	Ismail Sabri Yaakob (I)
	Mohamed Khaled Nordin (b. 1958); MP for Kota Tinggi	BN (UMNO)	Minister of Higher Education	3 December 2022	12 December 2023	Yusof Apdal	Anwar Ibrahim (I)
	Dr. Zambry Abdul Kadir (b. 1962); Senator	BN (UMNO)	Minister of Higher Education	12 December 2023	Incumbent	Mustapha Sakmud	Anwar Ibrahim (I)
