= Law Hieng Ding =

Malaysian politician

Yang Berbahagia Tan Sri Dato' Seri Law Hieng Ding PSM DGPN PNBS
- 刘贤镇
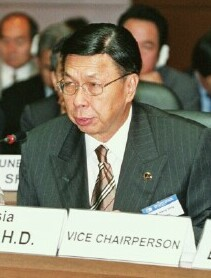
- Law in 2003

Minister of Science, Technology and Environment
- In office 27 October 1990 – 26 March 2004
- Monarchs: Azlan Shah; Ja'afar; Salahuddin; Sirajuddin
- Prime Minister: Mahathir Mohamad; Abdullah Ahmad Badawi
- Deputy: 1. Peter Chin Fah Kui (1990-1995); 2. Abu Bakar Daud (1995-1999); 3. Zainal Dahlan (1999-2004)
- Preceded by: Stephen Yong Kuet Tze
- Succeeded by: Jamaluddin Jarjis
- Constituency: Sarikei

Deputy Minister of Science, Technology and Environment
- In office 1987–1990
- Monarchs: Iskandar; Azlan Shah
- Prime Minister: Mahathir Mohamad
- Minister: Stephen Yong Kuet Tze
- Preceded by: Office established
- Succeeded by: Peter Chin Fah Kui
- Constituency: Sarikei

Member of the Malaysian Parliament for Sarikei
- In office 1982–2008
- Preceded by: Chieng Tiong Kai (SUPP-BN)
- Succeeded by: Ding Kuong Hiing (SUPP-BN)
- Majority: 81 (1982); 519 (1986); 4,612 (1990) uncontested (1995); 7,363 (1999); 11,599 (2004)

Personal details
- Born: 4 October 1935 Sibu, Crown Colony of Sarawak
- Died: 25 December 2018 (aged 83)
- Resting place: Sibu, Sarawak, Malaysia
- Party: Sarawak United People's Party (SUPP)
- Other political affiliations: Barisan Nasional (BN)
- Spouse: Puan Sri Ngui Soon Leng
- Children: 3
- Education: Nanyang University

Law Hieng Ding (simplified Chinese: 刘贤镇; traditional Chinese: 劉賢鎮; pinyin: Liú Xiánzhèn; 4 October 1935 – 25 December 2018) was a Malaysian politician. He was the Minister of Science, Technology and Environment from 1990 to 2004. Between 1982 and 2008, Law was a member of parliament representing Sarikei.

== Education ==
He graduated from Nanyang University, Singapore in 1960 with a bachelor's degree of Commerce in Accountancy and Banking.

== Career and politics ==
Law started his political career in 1972 and has held the seat for the past six terms. He was a deputy minister from 1987 to 1990, and a Cabinet Minister from 1990 to 2004. He was also the Deputy President of Sarawak United People's Party (SUPP) and Nantah Education & Research Foundation as well as chairman or director to a number of public companies and foundation.

== Death ==
Law died on 25 December 2018 at the age of 82 during the Christmas Day celebration.

== Election results ==
Parliament of Malaysia
Year	Constituency	Candidate	Votes	Pct	Opponent(s)	Votes	Pct	Ballots cast	Majority	Turnout
1982	P142 Sarikei	Law Hieng Ding (SUPP)	8,389	48.42%	Chong Siew Chiang (DAP)	8,308	47.96%	17,579	81	
1982	P142 Sarikei	Law Hieng Ding (SUPP)	8,389	48.42%	Nyandang Linang (IND)	449	2.59%	17,579	81	
1982	P142 Sarikei	Law Hieng Ding (SUPP)	8,389	48.42%	Ling Tung Lee (SAPO)	178	1.03%	17,579	81	
1986	P166 Sarikei	Law Hieng Ding (SUPP)	10,589	51.26%	Chong Siew Chiang (DAP)	10,070	48.74%	20,873	519	76.17%
1990	P168 Sarikei	Law Hieng Ding (SUPP)	12,584	61.22%	Chian Pao Koh (DAP)	7,972	38.78	20,799	4,612	73.45%
1995	P180 Sarikei	Law Hieng Ding (SUPP)	None	None	Unopposed					
1999	P181 Sarikei	Law Hieng Ding (SUPP)	15,212	65.41%	Michael Tiang Ming Tee (DAP)	7,849	33.75%	23,568	7,363	70.32%
1999	P181 Sarikei	Law Hieng Ding (SUPP)	15,212	65.41%	Yii Chu Lik (IND)	197	0.85%	23,568	7,363	70.32%
2004	P207 Sarikei	Law Hieng Ding (SUPP)	15,485	70.70%	Ngu Tieng Hai (IND)	3,886	17.74%	22,173	11,599	61.80%
2004	P207 Sarikei	Law Hieng Ding (SUPP)	15,485	70.70%	Ling Bit Tiing (IND)	1,667	7.61%	22,173	11,599	61.80%
2004	P207 Sarikei	Law Hieng Ding (SUPP)	15,485	70.70%	Junak Jawek (IND)	864	3.94%	22,173	11,599	61.80%

== Honours ==
- Malaysia
  - Commander of the Order of Loyalty to the Crown of Malaysia (PSM) – Tan Sri (2005)
- Sarawak
  - Knight Commander of the Most Exalted Order of the Star of Sarawak (PNBS) – Dato Sri (1992)
- Penang
  - Commander of the Order of the Defender of State (DGPN) – Dato' Seri (2001)
