= Huang Tiong Sii =

Malaysian politician and businessman

Yang Berhormat Dato' Sri Huang Tiong Sii SSAP DIMP PGBK MP MLA
- 范长锡

Deputy Minister of Plantation and Commodities
- Incumbent
- Assumed office 17 December 2025
- Monarch: Ibrahim Iskandar
- Prime Minister: Anwar Ibrahim
- Minister: Noraini Ahmad
- Preceded by: Chan Foong Hin
- Constituency: Sarikei

Deputy Minister of Natural Resources and Environmental Sustainability
- In office 12 December 2023 – 17 December 2025
- Monarchs: Abdullah (2023–2024); Ibrahim Iskandar (since 2024)
- Prime Minister: Anwar Ibrahim
- Minister: Nik Nazmi Nik Ahmad (2023–2025)
- Preceded by: Himself (Deputy Minister of Natural Resources, Environment and Climate Change)
- Succeeded by: Syed Ibrahim Syed Noh
- Constituency: Sarikei

Deputy Minister of Natural Resources, Environment and Climate Change
- In office 10 December 2022 – 12 December 2023
- Monarch: Abdullah
- Prime Minister: Anwar Ibrahim
- Minister: Nik Nazmi Nik Ahmad
- Preceded by: Ali Biju (Deputy Minister of Energy and Natural Resources); Mansor Othman (Deputy Minister of Environment and Water)
- Succeeded by: Himself (Deputy Minister of Natural Resources and Environmental Sustainability); Akmal Nasrullah Mohd Nasir (Deputy Minister of Energy Transition and Public Utilities)
- Constituency: Sarikei

Member of the Malaysian Parliament for Sarikei
- Incumbent
- Assumed office 19 November 2022
- Preceded by: Wong Ling Biu (PH–DAP)
- Majority: 3,697 (2022)

Member of the Sarawak State Legislative Assembly for Repok
- Incumbent
- Assumed office 7 May 2016
- Preceded by: Wong Hua Seh (DAP)
- Majority: 943 (2016); 7,308 (2021)

Personal details
- Born: Huang Tiong Sii Sarikei, Sarawak
- Citizenship: Malaysian
- Party: Sarawak United People's Party (SUPP) (since 1973)
- Other political affiliations: Barisan Nasional (BN) (1973–2018); Gabungan Parti Sarawak (GPS) (since 2018)
- Occupation: Politician; businessman

Huang Tiong Sii (Chinese: 范长锡; pinyin: Fàn Chángxī) is a Malaysian politician and businessman who has served as Deputy Minister of Natural Resources and Environmental Sustainability in the Unity Government administration under Prime Minister Anwar Ibrahim and Minister Nik Nazmi Nik Ahmad since December 2023, the Member of Parliament (MP) for Sarikei since November 2022 as well as Member of the Sarawak State Legislative Assembly (MLA) for Repok since May 2016. He served as the Deputy Minister of Natural Resources, Environment and Climate Change in the PH administration under Prime Minister Anwar and Minister Nik Nazmi from December 2022 to December 2023. He is a member, Vice President and Division Chief of Sarikei of the Sarawak United People's Party (SUPP), a component party of the Gabungan Parti Sarawak (GPS) and formerly Barisan Nasional (BN) coalitions. He also served as Director of the logging firm MM Golden (M) Sdn Bhd prior to his deputy ministerial appointment.

== Election results ==
Parliament of Malaysia
| Year | Constituency | Candidate | Votes | Pct | Opponent(s) | Votes | Pct | Ballots cast | Majority | Turnout |
|---|---|---|---|---|---|---|---|---|---|---|
| 2018 | P208 Sarikei | Huang Tiong Sii (SUPP) | 13,757 | 45.14% | Wong Ling Biu (DAP) | 16,327 | 53.57% | 30,895 | 2,570 | 78.09% |
| 2018 | P208 Sarikei | Huang Tiong Sii (SUPP) | 13,757 | 45.14% | Wong Chin King (PBK) | 392 | 1.29% | 30,895 | 2,570 | 78.09% |
| 2022 | P208 Sarikei | Huang Tiong Sii (SUPP) | 20,080 | 55.07% | Roderick Wong Siew Lead (DAP) | 16,383 | 44.93% | 37,025 | 3,697 | 67.30% |

Sarawak State Legislative Assembly
| Year | Constituency | Candidate | Votes | Pct | Opponent(s) | Votes | Pct | Ballots cast | Majority | Turnout |
|---|---|---|---|---|---|---|---|---|---|---|
| 2016 | N45 Repok | Huang Tiong Sii (SUPP) | 7,446 | 51.96% | Yong Siew Wei (DAP) | 6,503 | 45.38% | 14,330 | 943 | 71.57% |
| 2016 | N45 Repok | Huang Tiong Sii (SUPP) | 7,446 | 51.96% | Wong Chin King (IND) | 381 | 2.66% | 14,330 | 943 | 71.57% |
| 2021 | N45 Repok | Huang Tiong Sii (SUPP) | 10,038 | 73.15% | Philip Wong Pack Ming (DAP) | 2,730 | 19.90% | 13,722 | 7,308 | 58.29% |
| 2021 | N45 Repok | Huang Tiong Sii (SUPP) | 10,038 | 73.15% | Joseph Wong Kung King (PBK) | 738 | 5.38% | 13,722 | 7,308 | 58.29% |
| 2021 | N45 Repok | Huang Tiong Sii (SUPP) | 10,038 | 73.15% | Wong Chin King (ASPIRASI) | 216 | 1.57% | 13,722 | 7,308 | 58.29% |

== Honours ==
=== Honours of Malaysia ===
- Malaysia
  - Recipient of the 17th Yang di-Pertuan Agong Installation Medal (2024)
- Pahang
  - Knight Grand Companion of the Order of Sultan Ahmad Shah of Pahang (SSAP) – Dato' Sri (2011)
  - Knight Companion of the Order of the Crown of Pahang (DIMP) – Dato' (2006)
- Sarawak
  - Commander of the Order of the Star of Hornbill Sarawak (PGBK) – Datuk (2024)
  - Gold Medal of the Sarawak Independence Diamond Jubilee Medal (2023)
