= Parit Sulong (federal constituency) =

Federal constituency in Johor, Malaysia

Parit Sulong (P147)
Johor constituency

Federal constituency
- Legislature: Dewan Rakyat
- MP: Noraini Ahmad; BN
- Constituency created: 1984
- First contested: 1986
- Last contested: 2022

Demographics
- Population (2020): 82,399
- Electors (2026): 81,306
- Area (km²): 468
- Pop. density (per km²): 176.1

Parit Sulong is a federal constituency in Batu Pahat District, Johor, Malaysia, that has been represented in the Dewan Rakyat since 1986.

The federal constituency was created in the 1984 redistribution and is mandated to return a single member to the Dewan Rakyat under the first past the post voting system.

== Demographics ==
Ethnic breakdown of Parit Sulong's electorate as of 2022
1. Malay (81.3%)
2. Chinese (18.2%)
3. Indian (0.40%)
4. Other ethnicities (0.20%)

As of 2020, Parit Sulong has a population of 82,399 people.

Age breakdown of Parit Sulong's electorate as of 2022
1. 18-20 (5.87%)
2. 21-29 (20.4%)
3. 30-39 (20.0%)
4. 40-49 (16.2%)
5. 50-59 (16.0%)
6. 60-69 (12.1%)
7. 70-79 (6.24%)
8. 80-89 (2.67%)
9. above 90 (0.54%)
Gender breakdown of Parit Sulong's electorate as of 2022
1. Male (49.1%)
2. Female (50.9%)

== History ==
=== Polling districts ===
According to the gazette issued on 2 July 2026, the Parit Sulong constituency has a total of 43 polling districts.

State constituency	Polling Districts	Code	Location
Semerah（N17）	Parit Nibong Darat	147/17/01	SK Seri Utama
Semerah（N17）	Batu Puteh	147/17/02	SK Seri Ma'amor
Semerah（N17）	Separap	147/17/03	SK Seri Separap
Semerah（N17）	Kampong Batu Puteh	147/17/04	SK Seri Jasa Sepakat
Semerah（N17）	Semerah	147/17/05	SK Peserian
Semerah（N17）	Bandar Semerah	147/17/06	SMK Semerah
Semerah（N17）	Lubok	147/17/07	SK Lubok
Semerah（N17）	Parit Kuda	147/17/08	SK Seri Pengkalan
Semerah（N17）	Parit Besar	147/17/09	SK Seri Sekawan Desa
Semerah（N17）	Gambut	147/17/10	SK Gambut
Semerah（N17）	Bagan	147/17/11	SK Bagan
Semerah（N17）	Mamapan	147/17/12	SK Penghulu Salleh
Semerah（N17）	Kampong Bintang	147/17/13	SMK Dato Onn
Semerah（N17）	Simpang Lima	147/17/14	SA Seri Muafakat
Semerah（N17）	Sungai Kajang	147/17/15	SK Sungai Kajang
Semerah（N17）	Peresai	147/17/16	SA Peresai
Semerah（N17）	Shahbandar	147/17/17	SK Bandar
Semerah（N17）	Jalan Jenang	147/17/18	Kwong Shiew Association
Semerah（N17）	Pasar	147/17/19	SK Bandar
Semerah（N17）	Jalan Engan	147/17/20	SK Bandar
Semerah（N17）	Panchoran Ayer	147/17/21	SA Bandar Batu Pahat
Semerah（N17）	Kampong Pantai Barat	147/17/22	OUM Pusat Pembelajaran Batu Pahat
Semerah（N17）	Kampong Pantai Timor	147/17/23	SA Bandar Batu Pahat
Semerah（N17）	Kampong Pantai	147/17/24	Tabika Perpaduan Rumah Pangsa Pantai
Semerah（N17）	Parit Maimon	147/17/25	SK Seri Laksana
Semerah（N17）	Parit Puasa	147/17/26	SA Seri Laksana
Sri Medan（N18）	Parit Gantong	147/18/01	SK Seri Tiga Serangkai
Sri Medan（N18）	Parit Jayos	147/18/02	SK Sejagong
Sri Medan（N18）	Parit Dayong	147/18/03	SK Seri Dayong
Sri Medan（N18）	Kampong Sri Pasir	147/18/04	SK Seri Pasir
Sri Medan（N18）	Sri Medan Barat	147/18/05	SK Seri Sejati
Sri Medan（N18）	Parit Warijo	147/18/06	Dewan Orang Ramai Seri Medan
Sri Medan（N18）	Parit Karjan	147/18/07	SK Sri Permatang Rengas
Sri Medan（N18）	Parit Sulong	147/18/08	SMK Dato Sulaiman
Sri Medan（N18）	Bandar Parit Sulong	147/18/09	SK Parit Sulong
Sri Medan（N18）	Sentang Batu	147/18/10	SK Seri Chantek
Sri Medan（N18）	Parit Othman	147/18/11	SK Seri Maimon
Sri Medan（N18）	Parit Haji Siraj	147/18/12	SA Kampung Jawa
Sri Medan（N18）	Parit Betong	147/18/13	SA Seri Chomel
Sri Medan（N18）	Parit Abdul Rahman	147/18/14	SK Seri Chomel
Sri Medan（N18）	Bandar Sri Medan	147/18/15	SK Seri Medan
Sri Medan（N18）	Sri Medan Timor	147/18/16	SA Seri Medan
Sri Medan（N18）	Air Putih	147/18/17	SK Air Putih

=== Representation history ===
Members of Parliament for Parit Sulong
Parliament	No	Years	Member	Party	Vote Share
Constituency created from Semerah and Ayer Hitam
7th	P121	1986–1990	Shariffah Dorah Syed Mohammed (شريفه دورح سيد محمد)	BN (UMNO)	Uncontested
8th	P121	1990–1995	Ruhanie Ahmad (روحاني احمد)	BN (UMNO)	23,536; 57.54%
9th	P131	1995–1999	Ruhanie Ahmad (روحاني احمد)	BN (UMNO)	32,812; 81.48%
10th	P131	1999–2004	Ruhanie Ahmad (روحاني احمد)	BN (UMNO)	31,260; 69.68%
11th	P147	2004–2008	Syed Hood Syed Edros (سيد هواود سيد ايدروس)	BN (UMNO)	26,974; 73.37%
12th	P147	2008–2013	Noraini Ahmad (نورعيني أحمد)	BN (UMNO)	26,066; 67.65%
13th	P147	2013–2018	Noraini Ahmad (نورعيني أحمد)	BN (UMNO)	30,258; 62.05%
14th	P147	2018–2022	Noraini Ahmad (نورعيني أحمد)	BN (UMNO)	24,481; 49.19%
15th	P147	2022–present	Noraini Ahmad (نورعيني أحمد)	BN (UMNO)	25,740; 40.89%

=== State constituency ===
Parliamentary constituency	State constituency						
Parliamentary constituency	1954–59*	1959–1974	1974–1986	1986–1995	1995–2004	2004–2018	2018–present
Parit Sulong				Semerah			
Parit Sulong				Sri Medan			

=== Historical boundaries ===
State Constituency	Area			
State Constituency	1984	1994	2003	2018
Semerah	Bagan; Parit Lintang Separap; Peserai; Semerah; Taman Ampuan			
Sri Medan	Kampung Parit Pulai; Kampung Sri Murni; Parit Sulong; Seri Medan; Seri Pasir			

=== Current state assembly members ===
No.	State Constituency	Member	Coalition (Party)
N17	Semerah	Mohd Fared Mohd Khalid	BN (UMNO)
N18	Sri Medan	Zulkurnain Kamisan	BN (UMNO)

=== Local governments & postcodes ===
No.	State Constituency	Local Government	Postcode
N17	Semerah	Batu Pahat Municipal Council (Semerah and Peserai areas); Yong Peng District Council	83000 Batu Pahat; 83400 Seri Medan; 83500 Parit Sulong; 83600 Semerah; 83700 Yong Peng; 84150 Parit Jawa; 84600 Pagoh
N18	Sri Medan	Yong Peng District Council	83000 Batu Pahat; 83400 Seri Medan; 83500 Parit Sulong; 83600 Semerah; 83700 Yong Peng; 84150 Parit Jawa; 84600 Pagoh

== Election results ==
Malaysian general election, 2022
Party	Candidate	Votes	%	∆%
BN	Noraini Ahmad	25,740	40.89	▼8.30
PN	Abdul Karim Deraman	23,719	37.68	▲37.68
PH	Mohd Faizal Dollah	13,495	21.44	▲21.44
Total valid votes		62,954	100.00	
Total rejected ballots		499		
Unreturned ballots		244		
Turnout		63,697	79.20	▲5.99
Registered electors		79,484		
Majority		2,021	3.21	▼9.53
BN hold		Swing		
Source(s) https://lom.agc.gov.my/ilims/upload/portal/akta/outputp/1753254/PUB%20617%20PARLIMEN%20JOHOR.pdf

Malaysian general election, 2018
Party	Candidate	Votes	%	∆%
BN	Noraini Ahmad	24,481	49.19	▼12.86
PKR	Anis Afida Mohd Azli	18,140	36.45	▲36.45
PAS	Ahmad Rosdi Bahari	7,148	14.36	▼23.59
Total valid votes		49,769	100.00	
Total rejected ballots		832		
Unreturned ballots		177		
Turnout		50,778	85.19	▼2.43
Registered electors		59,609		
Majority		6,341	12.74	▼11.36
BN hold		Swing		
Source(s) "His Majesty's Government Gazette - Notice of Contested Election, Parliament for the State of Johore [P.U. (B) 244/2018]" (PDF). Attorney General's Chambers of Malaysia. 3 May 2018. Archived from the original (PDF) on 29 December 2019. "Federal Government Gazette - Results of Contested Election and Statements of the Poll after the Official Addition of Votes, Parliamentary Constituencies for the State of Johore [P.U. (B) 318/2018]" (PDF). Attorney General's Chambers of Malaysia. 28 May 2018.

Malaysian general election, 2013
Party	Candidate	Votes	%	∆%
BN	Noraini Ahmad	30,258	62.05	▼5.60
PAS	Khairuddin Abdul Rahim	18,505	37.95	▲5.60
Total valid votes		48,763	100.00	
Total rejected ballots		952		
Unreturned ballots		140		
Turnout		49,855	87.62	▲8.72
Registered electors		56,896		
Majority		11,753	24.10	▼11.20
BN hold		Swing		
Source(s) "Federal Government Gazette - Notice of Contested Election, Parliament for the State of Johore [P.U. (B) 181/2013]" (PDF). Attorney General's Chambers of Malaysia. 26 April 2013. "Federal Government Gazette - Results of Contested Election and Statements of the Poll after the Official Addition of Votes, Parliamentary Constituencies for the State of Johore [P.U. (B) 222/2013]" (PDF). Attorney General's Chambers of Malaysia. 22 May 2013.

Malaysian general election, 2008
Party	Candidate	Votes	%	∆%
BN	Noraini Ahmad	26,066	67.65	▼5.72
PAS	Faisal Ali	12,467	32.35	▲5.72
Total valid votes		38,533	100.00	
Total rejected ballots		1,033		
Unreturned ballots		71		
Turnout		39,637	78.90	▲2.87
Registered electors		50,234		
Majority		13,599	35.30	▼11.44
BN hold		Swing		

Malaysian general election, 2004
Party	Candidate	Votes	%	∆%
BN	Syed Hood Syed Edros	26,974	73.37	▲3.69
PAS	Suhaizan Kayat	9,788	26.63	▼3.69
Total valid votes		36,762	100.00	
Total rejected ballots		1,244		
Unreturned ballots		110		
Turnout		38,116	76.03	▲2.08
Registered electors		50,134		
Majority		17,186	46.74	▲7.38
BN hold		Swing		

Malaysian general election, 1999
Party	Candidate	Votes	%	∆%
BN	Ruhanie Ahmad	31,260	69.68	▼11.80
PAS	Mohamed Hanipa Maidin	13,603	30.32	▲11.80
Total valid votes		44,863	100.00	
Total rejected ballots		1,117		
Unreturned ballots		26		
Turnout		46,006	73.95	▼0.24
Registered electors		62,208		
Majority		17,657	39.36	▼23.60
BN hold		Swing		

Malaysian general election, 1995
Party	Candidate	Votes	%	∆%
BN	Ruhanie Ahmad	32,812	81.48	▲23.94
PAS	Omar Jani	7,458	18.52	▲18.52
Total valid votes		40,270	100.00	
Total rejected ballots		2,646		
Unreturned ballots		551		
Turnout		43,467	74.19	▼0.67
Registered electors		58,591		
Majority		25,354	62.96	▲47.88
BN hold		Swing		

Malaysian general election, 1990
Party	Candidate	Votes	%	∆%
BN	Ruhanie Ahmad	23,536	57.54	▲57.54
S46	Dasuki Abdul Kadir	17,365	42.46	▲42.46
Total valid votes		40,901	100.00	
Total rejected ballots		1,598		
Unreturned ballots		0		
Turnout		42,499	74.86	
Registered electors		56,771		
Majority		6,171	15.08	
BN hold		Swing		

Malaysian general election, 1986
Party	Candidate	Votes	%
On the nomination day, Shariffah Dorah Syed Mohammed won uncontested.
BN	Shariffah Dorah Syed Mohammed		
Total valid votes			100.00
Total rejected ballots			
Unreturned ballots			
Turnout			
Registered electors			
Majority			
This was a new constituency created.
