= Parti Bumi Kenyalang =

Malaysian political party

Parti Bumi Kenyalang Land of the Hornbill Party
- Bahasa Sarawak/ Malay name: Parti Bumi Kenyalang
- Chinese name: 肯雅蘭全民黨 肯雅兰全民党; Kěnyǎlán Quánmíndǎng
- Abbreviation: PBK
- President: Voon Lee Shan
- Secretary-General: Priscilla Lau
- Deputy President: Peli Aron
- Permanent Chairman: Yii Sie Tung
- Legalised: August 28, 2013; 13 years ago
- Headquarters: 1st Floor, 13, Lorong Wong King Huo 5, 96000 Sibu, Sarawak
- Ideology: Sarawak nationalism Sabah nationalism Borneo-centrism politics Third Way; Social justice Self-determination; Borneo reformism Multiracial democracy Regionalism
- Political position: Centre to centre-right
- National affiliation: PSB, PBDS, and ASPIRASI (2020–2024)
- Colours: Gold, Red, Black
- Dewan Rakyat: 0 / 222
- Dewan Negara: 0 / 70
- Sarawak State Legislative Assembly: 0 / 82
- Sabah State Legislative Assembly: 0 / 73

Website
- www.e-pbk.com

Parti Bumi Kenyalang (PBK) is a Malaysian political party founded in 2013. The party's name translates to "Land of the Hornbill Party". According to its constitution, PBK is a Sarawak based party with a primary focus on the rights and interests of the Borneo States of Sarawak and Sabah.

The party's main platform is to seek independence by peaceful means for Sarawak and Sabah from the federation of Malaysia, citing the right to self-determination under international law and the terms of the Malaysia Agreement 1963 (MA63) and Sarawak 18-Point Agreement. It advocates for the restoration and protection of the rights of Borneo States (Sarawak, Sabah, and Labuan) as they were originally constituted.

== History ==
The party was officially registered with the Registrar of Societies of Malaysia on 28 August 2013. It made its electoral debut in the 2018 Malaysian general election by contesting the Sarikei parliamentary seat.

== Objectives and Ideology ==
According to its constitution, Parti Bumi Kenyalang's core objectives include:

- To protect the inalienable rights of the inhabitants of Sarawak and Sabah as affirmed in their respective State constitutions and the Federal Constitution of Malaysia.
- To defend, preserve, and protect the territorial integrity, independence, and sovereignty of Sarawak and Sabah.
- To represent the peoples of Sarawak and Sabah in elections held throughout Sarawak, Sabah, and Malaya.

Membership is open to all Malaysian citizens aged 18 and above who are inhabitants of either Sarawak or Sabah.

== Leadership structure ==
=== PBK Supreme Council ===
- Permanent Chairman:
  - Yii Sie Tung
- Deputy Permanent Chairman:
  - Vacant
- President:
  - Voon Lee Shan
- Deputy President:
  - Peli Aron
- Vice Presidents:
  - Saharuddin Abdullah
- Vice President (Women):
  - Jamie Tiew Yen Houng
- Vice President (Youth):
  - Linang Chapum
- Secretary General:
  - Priscilla Lau
- Deputy Secretary General:
  - Olivia Lim Wen Sia
- Treasurer:
  - Eric Ngieng
- Organising Secretary:
  - Leslie Ting

== Electoral history ==
The party made its electoral debut in the 2018 Malaysian general election. For the 2022 Malaysian general election, PBK agreed with Parti Sarawak Bersatu to jointly use the PSB logo for the election.

== General election results ==
Election	Total seats won	Seats contested	Total votes	Voting Percentage	Outcome of election	Election leader
2018	0 / 222	1	392	0.00%	0 seat; No representation in Parliament	Yu Chang Ping
2022	0 / 222	3	2,311	0.01%	0 seat; No representation in Parliament	Voon Lee Shan

== State election results ==
State election	Count		State Legislative Assembly				Position (Note: As part of electoral coalition.)	Status
State election	Votes	%	Sarawak	Sabah	Won / Contested	+/–	Position	Status
2021	40,763	5.5	0 / 82		0 / 73	Steady	4th	No seats
2025	1,337	0.1		0 / 73	0 / 14	Steady	14th	No seats
