= Yaakob Sapari =

Malaysian politician

Senator

Elected by Selangor State Legislative Assembly
- In office 5 December 2018 – 4 December 2021

Member of the Selangor State Executive Council
- In office 13 March 2008 – 5 May 2013 (Modernisation of Agriculture, Natural Resources and Entrepreneurial Development)
- Monarch: Sharafuddin
- Menteri Besar: Abdul Khalid Ibrahim
- Succeeded by: Sallehen Mukhyi (Agricultural Modernisation) Portfolio abolished (Natural Resources); Daroyah Alwi (Entrepreneur Development)

Faction represented in Dewan Negara
- 2018–: Pakatan Harapan
- 2008–2018: Parti Keadilan Rakyat

Personal details
- Born: 14 August 1961 (age 65) Pontian, Johor, Federation of Malaya (now Malaysia)
- Citizenship: Malaysian
- Party: Parti Keadilan Nasional (keADILan) (1999–2003); Parti Keadilan Rakyat (PKR) (2003–present)
- Other political affiliations: Barisan Alternatif (BA) (1999–2004); Pakatan Rakyat (PR) (2008–2015); Pakatan Harapan (PH) (2015–present)
- Education: Universiti Putra Malaysia; Universiti Kebangsaan Malaysia
- Occupation: Politician

Yaakob bin Sapari is a Malaysian politician and member of the People's Justice Party (PKR). He served as a member of the Dewan Negara representing Selangor from December 2018 to December 2021. He had previously represented Kota Anggerik in the Selangor State Legislative Assembly for two terms, from 2008 to 2018, and was a member of the Selangor State Executive Council from 2008 to 2013.

== Political career ==
Yaakob first contested a seat in the Selangor State Legislative Assembly in 1999, standing for Parti Keadilan Nasional in Puchong. He contested Seri Serdang for PKR in 2004, but lost both elections. In the 2008 election, he won Kota Anggerik with 15,738 votes and a majority of 2,200. He retained the seat in 2013, receiving 26,261 votes and a majority of 4,503.

Following the 2008 election, Yaakob was sworn in as one of ten members of the Selangor State Executive Council on 24 March. His responsibilities covered agriculture modernisation, natural resources and entrepreneurial development. He left the council in May 2013, when a new executive council was sworn in, but continued to represent Kota Anggerik in the state assembly. During the 2014 Selangor Menteri Besar crisis, his name was included among the candidates for Menteri Besar submitted to the Selangor palace by the Malaysian Islamic Party (PAS).

PKR did not nominate Yaakob for a third term in Kota Anggerik in the 2018 election. He publicly accepted the decision and said that he would support the party's replacement candidate. Later that year, the Selangor State Legislative Assembly elected him to the Dewan Negara for a three-year term running from 5 December 2018 to 4 December 2021.

In January 2019, while also serving as head of PKR's Shah Alam branch, Yaakob was appointed to the governing committee of the National Farmers' Organisation (NAFAS). During the 2023 Selangor state election, he served as Selangor PKR's election director.

== Election results ==
Selangor State Legislative Assembly
Year	Constituency	Candidate	Votes	Pct	Opponent(s)	Votes	Pct	Ballots cast	Majority	Turnout
1999	N29 Puchong	Yaakob Sapari (KeADILan)	12,890	41.92%	Mohamad Satim Diman (UMNO)	17,861	58.08%	32,173	4,971	74.67%
2004	N29 Seri Serdang	Yaakob Sapari (PKR)	7,378	28.88%	Mohamad Satim Diman (UMNO)	17,923	70.16%	26,014	10,545	65.55%
2004	N29 Seri Serdang	Yaakob Sapari (PKR)	7,378	28.88%	Mazli Mansor (IND)	246	0.96%	26,014	10,545	65.55%
2008	N40 Kota Anggerik	Yaakob Sapari (PKR)	15,738	53.76%	Ahmad Nawawi M. Zin (UMNO)	13,538	46.24%	29,830	2,200	77.60%
2013	N40 Kota Anggerik	Yaakob Sapari (PKR)	26,261	54.53%	Mohd Yusof Din (UMNO)	21,578	45.18%	48,738	4,503	88.69%
2013	N40 Kota Anggerik	Yaakob Sapari (PKR)	26,261	54.53%	Eriq Faisal Rusli (IND)	136	0.28%	48,738	4,503	88.69%
