= Tharma Pillai =

Malaysian civil society activist (born 1993)

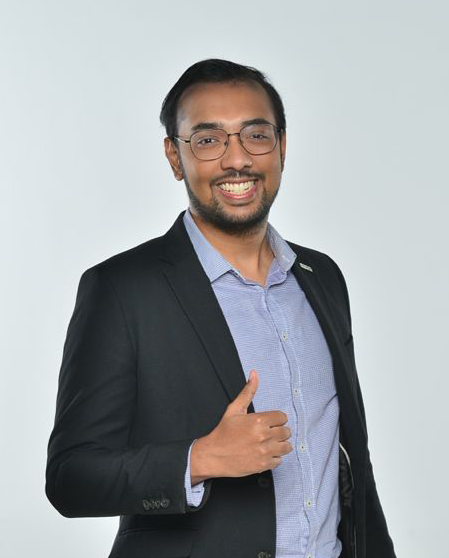
- Born: Tharmelinggem Pillai; 19 April 1993 (age 33); Hospital Kuala Lumpur, Kuala Lumpur, Malaysia
- Occupation: Civil society activist
- Years active: 2016–present
- Movement: UNDI18
- Website: https://undi18.org

Tharmelinggem Pillai (born April 19, 1993) is a Malaysian youth activist, best known for his role as the co-founder and advocacy director of UNDI18, a civil society movement that successfully championed the lowering of Malaysia’s voting age from 21 to 18 years old.

Pillai’s youth activism began during his undergraduate years at Virginia Polytechnic Institute and State University, where he studied under a Malaysian Public Service Department (JPA) scholarship. As vice president of the Malaysian Students Global Alliance in 2016, Pillai, along with fellow UNDI18 co-founder Qyira Yusri, initiated advocacy for reducing the voting age. This effort culminated in a constitutional amendment in 2019, which received unanimous approval from both the Dewan Rakyat and Dewan Negara.

As co-founder of UNDI18, Pillai is credited with successfully advocating for the constitutional amendment that lowered both the voting age and the minimum age for standing in elections in Malaysia from 21 to 18. He also led the #ManaUndiKami protests to pressure the government into implementing the amendment after repeated delays by the Muhyiddin Yassin administration.

Pillai has been recognized by numerous organizations for his work in civil society, social activism, and impact across democracy, human rights, youth empowerment, and food security.

== Early life ==
Born into a working-class family in Kuala Lumpur, Pillai was raised by his mother and extended family, whom he credits for their vital support during his formative years. His upbringing, in a single-parent, lower-income household, deeply influenced his outlook on life. Pillai's aunt, Dr. Selva Vathany, an advocate for the Orang Asli community, played an instrumental role in inspiring his commitment to social justice and activism.

Pillai’s education began in Kuala Lumpur’s public schools before he enrolled at the prestigious Royal Military College in Sungai Besi at the age of 16. The discipline and structure of military schooling, combined with his personal experiences, shaped his understanding of leadership. After excelling in the Sijil Pelajaran Malaysia (SPM) examinations with straight As, he secured a Malaysian Public Service Department (JPA) scholarship to pursue higher education at the Virginia Polytechnic Institute and State University, where he earned a Bachelor of Science in Mining Engineering. His exposure to global political events, particularly the 2016 U.S. Presidential Election, ignited his passion for youth political empowerment.

== Activism ==
=== Virginia Tech and student activism ===
While studying at Virginia Tech in 2016, Pillai's engagement in youth activism began through his involvement with the Malaysian Students’ Global Alliance (MSGA). He and fellow student and youth leader, Qyira Yusri spearheaded a campaign advocating for the reduction of Malaysia’s voting age. Their vision led to the formation of UNDI18 in 2017, a movement dedicated to lowering the voting age to 18, a goal that aligned with international democratic norms. Although their initial petition to amend Article 119(1)(a) of the Federal Constitution of Malaysia was not immediately successful, it laid the groundwork for future advocacy. The campaign gained traction when several opposition leaders included the proposal in the Pakatan Harapan Youth Manifesto, which was subsequently incorporated into the party’s main election manifesto.

=== Constitutional Amendment and the 14th Parliament ===
After the 14th Malaysian General Election and the formation of the Pakatan Harapan government, UNDI18 worked with the new administration to implement the lowering of the voting age in line with their election promises. With the endorsement of Syed Saddiq, then Minister for Youth and Sports, and bipartisan support from across political divides, UNDI18 successfully lobbied for the unanimous passage of the Constitution (Amendment) Act 2019. This legislation lowered the voting age to 18, introduced automatic voter registration, and reduced the minimum age for candidacy. Full implementation was set for July 2021, two years after the bill’s passage.

=== Mana Undi Kami protests and judicial review ===
However, following the Sheraton Move in 2020, which led to the fall of the Pakatan Harapan government, the new Perikatan Nasional government delayed the implementation of the reforms, citing logistical challenges. The Election Commission announced that the amendments would not be implemented until September 2022, a decision that sparked widespread criticism.

In response, Pillai led the #ManaUndiKami protests, which began in March 2021, demanding immediate implementation of the voting reforms and the lifting of Parliament's suspension. Along with the protests, UNDI18 initiated judicial review applications in the Kuala Lumpur and Kuching High Courts, challenging the government's decision to delay implementation. The Kuching High Court ruled on September 3, 2022, that the delay was "irrational and unreasonable" and ordered the government to implement the constitutional amendments.

On December 15, 2021, the amendments were fully implemented, allowing millions of young Malaysians to vote and stand for election for the first time.

=== Activism during the COVID-19 pandemic ===
The COVID-19 pandemic and the political instability caused by the Sheraton Move brought additional challenges. Pillai, alongside other civil society members, co-founded Sekretariat Solidariti Rakyat, a coalition advocating for government accountability on issues such as Parliament's suspension and the declaration of a state of emergency. They criticized the government’s handling of the pandemic, particularly its impact on ordinary Malaysians.

Pillai played a pivotal role in organizing the #Lawan campaign, which culminated in a mass demonstration at Dataran Merdeka on July 31, 2021. Despite police harassment and threats, over 2,000 protestors gathered to demand Muhyiddin Yassin's resignation and the reconvening of Parliament's. The campaign threatened further protests if demands were not met, but Muhyiddin resigned on August 16, 2021.

=== Arrest and detention ===
On August 20, 2021, Pillai and 30 other activists were arrested by the Royal Malaysian Police at Dataran Merdeka during a candlelight vigil organized by Sekretariat Solidariti Rakyat. They were detained without explanation, had their phones and identification confiscated, and were later released after paying an RM2,000 fine for “violating regulations preventing demonstrations during the pandemic”. In response, Sekretariat Solidariti Rakyat filed a lawsuit against the police for unlawful arrest and detention.

=== Post-pandemic initiatives ===
Following the pandemic, Pillai continued to spearhead civic initiatives. In 2022, he led the VoteMalaysia campaign, an effort to facilitate postal voting for Malaysians abroad during the 15th General Election. The initiative successfully collected over 35,000 postal votes from 25 countries, ensuring that overseas Malaysians could participate in the democratic process.

Pillai also turned his attention to issues of food security, launching the Lawan Lapar initiative as part of his work with the Bertha Foundation in 2023. This initiative focused on raising awareness about food insecurity and advocating for the rights of smallholder farmers and fishermen in Malaysia, particularly in Perak and Pulau Pangkor.

== Honours and awards ==
Pillai has received numerous accolades for his work in youth empowerment and social advocacy. Notable awards include:

- Perdana Scholar Leadership Award, 2016
- Prestige 40 Under 40 Malaysia of 2019
- Forbes 30 Under 30 Asia, 2021
- Augustman, Men of the Year, 2021
- Gen.T Leaders of Tomorrow, 2022
- Tatler Asia’s Most Influential 2022
- Kofi Annan NextGen Democracy Prize Finalist, 2024.

== Publications ==
- Letters to Home (2016), co-authored with Ooi Kok Hin and other writers, reflects on the experiences of Malaysian students abroad. ISBN 978-9670954660
- The Asrama Anthology (2016), co-authored with Azlee Zan and other writers, delves into the experiences of former boarding school students. ISBN 978-9672128540
