= Amir Hariri Abdul Hadi =

Malaysian politician

- اأمير هاريري عبد هادي
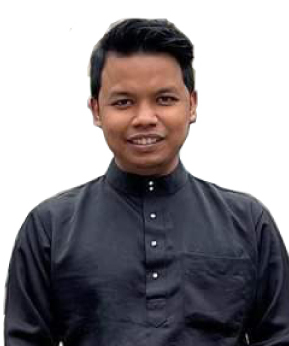
- Amir Hariri in 2022

1st and 3rd Secretary-General of the Malaysian United Democratic Alliance
- In office 24 July 2022 – 25 Jun 2025
- President: Syed Saddiq Syed Abdul Rahman (2022–2023); Amira Aisya Abdul Aziz (2023–present)
- Preceded by: Amira Aisya Abdul Aziz
- Succeeded by: Nurainie Haziqah Shafi'i
- In office 17 September 2020 – 24 August 2021
- President: Syed Saddiq Syed Abdul Rahman
- Preceded by: Position established
- Succeeded by: Amira Aisya Abdul Aziz

Personal details
- Born: Amir Hariri bin Abdul Hadi; 20 June 1991 (age 35) Kuala Lumpur, Malaysia
- Party: Malaysian United Democratic Alliance (MUDA) (2020–present)
- Education: Klang High School; Technical Institute of Kuala Lumpur
- Alma mater: Universiti Teknologi MARA (BA); SOAS University of London. (MA)
- Occupation: Politician

Amir Hariri bin Abdul Hadi (Jawi: ااأمير هاريري عبد هادي; born 20 June 1991) is a Malaysian politician who is a co-founder and member of the Malaysian United Democratic Alliance (MUDA). He was the founding, 1st and 3rd Secretary-General of MUDA from September 2020 to his resignation in August 2021 and again from July 2022 until July 2025.

== Early life and education ==
Amir Hariri was born at a hospital in Kuala Lumpur, Malaysia on 20 June 1991 as the third of four children of his parents. His father is a school bus operator while his mother is a teacher at PASTI kindergarten. His parents were the active grassroots activists of the Malaysian Islamic Party (PAS). He received his early education at Klang High School (HSK) before moving to Technical Institute of Kuala Lumpur (TiKL). He then pursued his studies at the bachelor's degree level in the field of business management at Universiti Teknologi MARA (UiTM). Amir Hariri is a Chevening scholarship recipient for the 2021/2022 session and previously pursued postgraduate studies in the United Kingdom in the field of politics of Asia at the SOAS University of London, received his Master of Arts (MA).

== Early career ==
His journey began at the university with the student movement. After finishing his studies, he was active with the Bangsar Utama Club, a collective of young people based in Bangsar Utama, which is active with various activities including the Kuala Lumpur Street Kitchen, providing free education to poor students, conducting political lectures, operating an online radio station, film club as well as being actively involved in organizing political movements, especially youth movements.

In 2015, together with student and youth activists, he co-founded Gerakan Anak Muda Demi Malaysia (later known as the Democratic People's League) and was appointed as its first Secretary General.

Liga Rakyat Demokratik (LRD) is a multi-partisan movement that aims to raise the voice of youth and actively organize movements throughout the country. LRD organized several demonstrations including the #ArrestNajib protest in 2015 regarding the 1MDB scandal involving the then Prime Minister, Najib Razak, where more than 30 activists including himself were arrested and locked up for several days. The LRD also organized the first Youth Congress in 2017, which brought together cross-party young people from all over the country; the first of its kind in Malaysia's modern history.

== Non-Governmental Organizations and International Engagement ==
After completing his studies, he was appointed as the coordinator of the Sedition Act Abolition Movement (GHAH), a coalition of more than 100 non-governmental organizations to urge the government to repeal the law. He then joined Suara Rakyat Malaysia (SUARAM), one of the leading human rights organizations in Malaysia. As the Senior Coordinator of SUARAM, he led several campaigns including the repeal of draconian laws, reforming security laws, and the empowerment of young people where he founded the SUARAM Activism School.

He also works closely with marginalized communities, such as the indigenous community in Gua Musang Kelantan, as well as being actively involved in defending residents in Merapoh, Pahang who are affected in terms of income and access to clean water due to illegal logging, factories and mines.

Internationally, he has traveled to more than 10 countries, on invitation to be a panel discussion and work closely with marginalized communities, especially in Southeast Asia.

Among his involvements include representing Malaysia in conferences and dialogues between the ASEAN Intergovernmental Commission on Human Rights (AICHR) and non-governmental organizations in Thailand, Indonesia and the Philippines; involved in the Human Rights Defenders conference in Dublin, Ireland; being a speaker in a thematic discussion at the ASEAN Civil Society Conference (ACSC/APF) in Timor Leste; as a panelist in the 7th Conference of Asian Human Rights Defenders in Colombo, Sri Lanka; speaker for several forums in several countries in Southeast Asia and was the main instructor for the Community Leaders Learning Exchange (CLLE) program working with community leaders in Malaysia, Thailand and Myanmar.

== The case of Siti Noor Aishah ==
Amir Hadi, as SUARAM's senior coordinator, is the individual responsible for leading the campaign to free Siti Noor Aishah and abolish the law of detention without trial. Siti Noor Aishah is a Universiti Malaya postgraduate student in the field of Usulluddin (Creed), who has been arrested by the police on charges of being involved with a terrorist group.

Amir Hadi in his campaign informed that the accusation against Aishah, under section 130(j)(b) of the Penal Code for having 12 books said to be related to terrorist groups is unfounded, because the books were not banned by the Ministry of Interior, and some can be bought in bookstores. Aishah was also released by the high court on 29 September 2016, before being arrested again on the same day under the Prevention of Crime Act 1959 (POCA).

== Political career ==
On 17 September 2020, he along with 12 others, including the former Minister of Youth and Sports, Syed Saddiq Syed Abdul Rahman, sent an application to register the Malaysian Democratic Alliance Party (MUDA). He was subsequently appointed as the Secretary General of MUDA and was responsible for establishing MUDA throughout the country, before leaving his position to continue his studies in the United Kingdom. He has now returned to Malaysia, and resumed his position as Secretary General of MUDA.

=== Candidate for the Member of the Selangor State Legislative Assembly (2023) ===
On 13 July 2023, Amir Hariri announced that he would make his electoral debut and be nominated by MUDA to contest for the Seri Serdang state seat in the 2023 Selangor state election. but he lost to the Pakatan Harapan candidate, Abbas Salimi Azmi.

== Controversies and issues ==
On 26 August 2022, Amir Hariri was charged in the Magistrate's Court for organising a protest gathering on the littoral combat ship (LCS) issue here. However, Amir Hariri pleaded not guilty to the charge before Magistrate Fardiana Haryanti Ahmad Razali. Amir Hariri, as the organiser of the gathering, had failed to inform the police officer in charge of Dang Wangi district five days before holding the assembly in front of the Sogo Complex in Jalan Tuanku Abdul Rahman at 2 pm on Aug 14.

== Election results ==
Selangor State Legislative Assembly
Year	Constituency	Name	Votes	%	Opponent(s)	Votes	%	Ballots cast	Majority	Turnout
2023	N29 Seri Serdang	Amir Hariri Abdul Hadi (MUDA)	1,834	2.78	Abbas Salimi Azmi (AMANAH)	37,411	56.77	66,348	10,752	71.16%
2023	N29 Seri Serdang	Amir Hariri Abdul Hadi (MUDA)	1,834	2.78	Mohd Shukor Mustaffa (BERSATU)	26,659	40.45	66,348	10,752	71.16%

== See also ==
- Selangor State Legislative Assembly
- Seri Serdang (state constituency)
- Malaysian United Democratic Alliance
