= Arul Arulrajah =

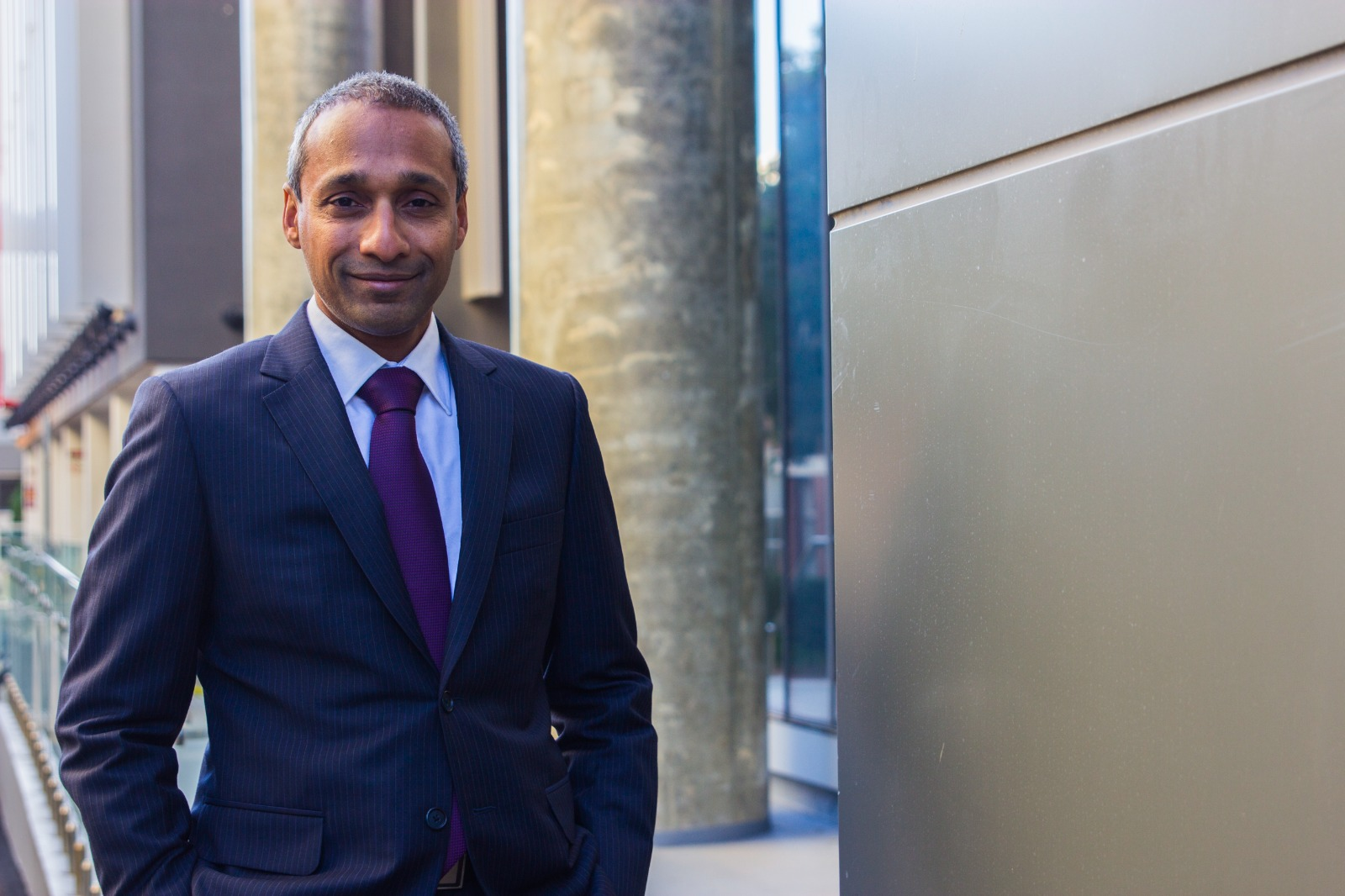
- Born: Kuala Lumpur, Malaysia
- Citizenship: Australia
- Occupations: Civil Engineer, Academic
- Known for: Recycled geomaterials, Transportation geotechnics, Ground improvement,
- Title: Professor

Arul Arulrajah is an Australian civil engineer and academic specialising in geotechnical engineering. He is a Professor of Geotechnical Engineering at Swinburne University of Technology.

== Early life and education ==
Arulrajah was born in Malaysia and raised in Singapore. Between the ages of one and six, he was raised by his uncle, a Singaporean civil engineer, and his aunt while his parents, both medical doctors, were studying in the United Kingdom. Arulrajah is of Malaysian, Singaporean and Ceylonese ancestry.

He completed his primary, secondary, and junior college education in Singapore, including at St Joseph's Institution and Raffles Junior College. He received a Bachelor of Science in Civil Engineering from Purdue University in 1992, a Master of Engineering Science in Geotechnical Engineering from the University of Malaya in 2003, and a PhD in Geotechnical Engineering from Curtin University in 2005.

== Industry career ==
Following the completion of his undergraduate degree in 1992, Arulrajah worked in the geotechnical engineering industry for 14 years until 2006. He was employed as a senior geotechnical engineer with several civil engineering consultancies in Australia, Singapore, and Malaysia. His work included projects related to ground improvement and transportation geotechnics. He was involved in major projects, including the Changi East Land reclamation in Singapore and a high-speed railway project in Malaysia.

== Academic career ==
Arulrajah's academic career commenced in 2006 when he joined Swinburne University of Technology as a Senior Lecturer. He was promoted to Associate Professor in 2010 and to Professor of Geotechnical Engineering in 2015. He leads the geotechnical engineering group and is the geotechnical laboratory director at Swinburne University of Technology.

Arulrajah was a Fellow of Engineers Australia and a Chartered Professional Engineer. He was a member of the Australian Geomechanics Society and the International Society of Soil Mechanics and Geotechnical Engineering. He also served on the executive committee of the Australian Geomechanics Society (Victorian Chapter) from 2008 to 2010.

== Research and contribution ==
Arulrajah’s research focuses on:

- Recycled geomaterials and sustainable geotechnics
- Ground improvement and soil stabilization
- Transportation geotechnics, including pavement and railway geotechnics
- Low-carbon alternative binders, including biocements and geopolymers
- Land reclamation and dredged materials

He has contributed to the development of geotechnical engineering applications for recycled geomaterials and low-carbon alternative binders, in civil infrastructure. His research has significantly increased the uptake of recycled materials in civil engineering construction projects and also resulted in the development of new test methods and engineering specifications.

Arulrajah has published one book, five book chapters, more than 400 journal publications, and more than 100 conference publications. His work has more than 30,000 citation and an H-index of 90. He has supervised more than 40 PhD students. Arulrajah has held editorial positions at nine academic journals, seven of which are ranked in the first quartile (Q1) by SCImago.

== Standards and specification ==
Arulrajah has contributed to the development of seven technical specifications for road authorities and local governments in Australia:

- Department of Transport and Planning/VicRoads (2020) - Section 813: Base and subbase for lower trafficked roads.
- VicRoads (2019) - Technical Note 107: Use of recycled materials in road pavements.
- VicRoads (2018) - Section 801: Materials sources for the production of crushed rock and aggregates.
- VicRoads (2017) - Code of Practice RC 500.02 - Registration of crushed rock mixes.
- VicRoads (2016) Section 815: Cementitious treated crushed concrete for pavement subbase.
- Municipal Association of Victoria (2011) - Demolition materials for granular base in footpaths.
- VicRoads (2009) - Technical Note 90: Use of biosolids for road embankment construction.

== Award and honours ==
Arulrajah has received the following awards:

- Telford Premium Prize (2021), Institution of Civil Engineers, United Kingdom.
- Chair Professor Award (2020), National Science and Technology Development Agency, Thailand. Conferred by Her Royal Highness Princess Maha Chakri Siridhon of Thailand.
- Distinguished Professor, Suranaree University of Technology, Thailand (2020).
- Finalist, Victorian Premier’s Sustainability Award (2020) – Built Environment Category; for “Recycled waste plastics and glass fines in concrete footpath”.
- Australian Pavement and Recycling Association (Auststab) - Highly Commended Award for Excellence in Sustainability (2018): Chemical and granular stabilisation of pavements using recycled materials.
- Finalist, The Australian Innovation Challenge (2014) - Manufacturing, Construction and Infrastructure category; for “Green roads and footpaths using recycled materials”.
- Australian Pavement and Recycling Association (Auststab) - Highly Commended Award for Excellence in Research and Education (2012): cementitious and granular stabilisation of recycled waste materials.
- Telford Premium Prize (2010), Institution of Civil Engineers, United Kingdom.
- Shamsher Prakash Prize for Excellence in the Practice of Geotechnical Engineering (2010), United States.
- Smart Water Fund (Wastewater Authorities in Victoria) Certificate of Recognition (2007).
- Swinburne University Vice-Chancellor/researcher awards (2025, 2019, 2018, 2012, 2009, 2008, 2007).

== Personal life ==
Arulrajah is married with two sons, a daughter and two daughters-in-law. He is a Christian.
