= Puchong (disambiguation) =

Puchong may refer to these places in Malaysia:

- Puchong, town in Selangor
- Puchong (federal constituency), represented in the Dewan Rakyat (1986–95; 2004–present)
- Puchong (state constituency), formerly represented in the Selangor State Legislative Assembly (1995–2004)
