= 2026 Malaysian United Democratic Alliance leadership election =

Election in a political party in Malaysia

- 14 March 2026
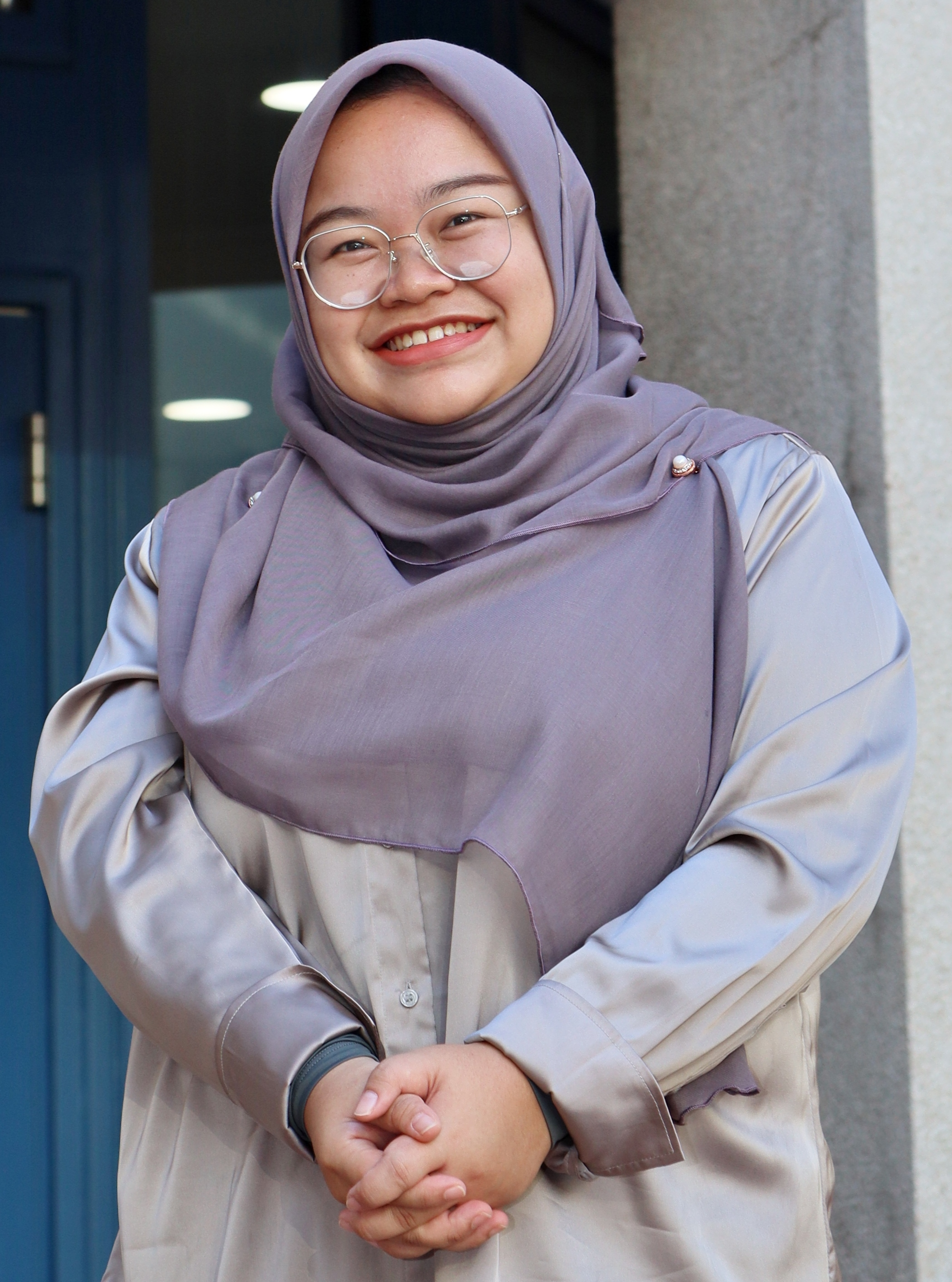
Candidate	Amira Aisya Abdul Aziz
Popular vote	103
President of MUDA before election
Amira Aisya Abdul Aziz (Acting)
President of MUDA after election
Amira Aisya Abdul Aziz

A leadership election will be held by the Malaysian United Democratic Alliance (MUDA) on 14 March 2026. Initially, the party planned to hold the election in the second quarter of 2024 and 2025.

== Election results ==
The following are the election results for the MUDA Central Executive Committee for the 2026–2029 session.

=== Central Executive Committee ===
Candidate	Delegates' votes
Dr. Siva	100
Dobby Chew Chuan Yang	92
Rasid Abu Bakar	101
Kathirvelloo a/l Neelamegam	94
Saiyidah Izzati Nur @ Cheda	104
Hasya 'Aqilah binti Ahmad Tajuddin	82
Zarul Afiq	100
Muhammad Amir Fiqri	82
Geethananthini	101
Andre Teow	102
Rahmat Amran	101
Daniel Lim	72
Muhammad Danial bin Abdul Majeed	88
Nurazam bin Aziz	68
V. K. K. Raja	70
Faezrah Rizalman	101
Adom Teh Kai Yang	81
Rashifa Aljunied	100
Shah Fariq Aizal bin Sha Ghazni	103
Amira Aisya binti Abd Aziz	103
Ainie Haziqah	100
Zaidel Baharuddin	101
Leben Siddarth	110
Siranjeev Ram a/l S. Sanjeeviramah	78
Muhammad Yusri Aidid bin Malik	73
Sangaran a/l Rawisandiran	64
Foo Tun Xiang	62
Yosh Wong	61
Syahmie Fayyadh bin Jaafar	62
Teh Poo Wen	50
Emir Syazwan	34
