= Standing orders in the Parliament of the United Kingdom =

Rule of procedure in the UK

A standing order is a rule of procedure in the Parliament of the United Kingdom. Both the House of Commons and the House of Lords can set standing orders to regulate their own affairs. These contain many important constitutional norms, including the government's control over business, but it ultimately rests with a majority of members in each House.

== House of Commons ==
The House of Commons Standing Orders concerns the following topics.

- Election of the Speaker
- Sittings of the House
- Questions, motions, amendments and statements
- Motions for Bills
- General debates
- Public money Bills
- Programming of Bills
- Grand committees and select committees
- Public petitions
- Parliamentary papers

== House of Lords ==
The House of Lords Standing Orders contain similar rules to the Commons. Rules 9 and 10 also govern the election of hereditary peers.

== See also ==
- UK constitutional law
- Parliamentary law
- Erksine May, the accompanying treatise of parliamentary practice
- Standing rules of other deliberative assemblies:
  - Rules of Procedure of the European Parliament
  - Standing Orders of Dáil Éireann (Ireland)
  - Standing Orders of the Dewan Rakyat (Malaysia)
  - Standing Rules of the United States Senate
