= Abbas Azmi =

Malaysian politician

Yang Berhormat Tuan Abbas Salimi Azmi MLA
- عباس سليم عزمي

Member of the Selangor State Legislative Assembly for Seri Serdang
- Incumbent
- Assumed office 12 August 2023
- Preceded by: Siti Mariah Mahmud (PH–AMANAH)
- Majority: 10,752 (2023)

Member of the Subang Jaya City Council
- In office 2018–2023
- President: Noraini Roslan

Vice Youth Chief IV of the National Trust Party
- In office 12 January 2020 – 17 December 2023
- President: Mohamad Sabu
- Youth Chief: Shazni Munir Mohd Ithnin (2020–2021); Mohd Hasbie Muda (2021–2023)

Personal details
- Party: National Trust Party (AMANAH)
- Other political affiliations: Pakatan Harapan (PH)
- Occupation: Politician

Abbas Salimi bin Azmi is a Malaysian politician who has served as Member of the Selangor State Legislative Assembly (MLA) for Seri Serdang since August 2023. He served as Member of the Subang Jaya Municipal Council (MPSJ) from 2018 to 2023. He is a member of the National Trust Party (AMANAH), a component party of the Pakatan Harapan (PH) coalition. He also served as the Vice Youth Chief IV of AMANAH from January 2020 to December 2023.

== Political career ==
=== Initiative on the death of fire officer, Adib Kassim ===
In 2018, he proposed the establishment of a special fund for the late Muhammad Adib Mohd Kassim as a sign of solidarity to the family of the late fire officer.

=== 2023 Selangor state election ===
He contested the Seri Serdang state election under Pakatan Harapan in 2023. In the three-cornered battle, he faced new candidates in the election – Amir Hariri Abdul Hadi from MUDA and Mohd Shukor Mustaffa from BERSATU, a component party of PN. When contesting, he emphasized that the state government has run many programs related to youth to help their well-being and he promised to continue those programs.

== Election results ==
Selangor State Legislative Assembly
Year	Constituency	Candidate	Votes	Pct	Opponent(s)	Votes	Pct	Ballots cast	Majority	Turnout
2023	N29 Seri Serdang	Abbas Salimi Azmi (AMANAH)	37,411	56.77%	Mohd Shukor Mutaffa (BERSATU)	26,659	40.45%	66,348	10,752	71.16%
2023	N29 Seri Serdang	Abbas Salimi Azmi (AMANAH)	37,411	56.77%	Amir Hariri Abdul Hadi (MUDA)	1,834	2.78%	66,348	10,752	71.16%
