= Siti Mariah Mahmud =

Malaysian politician

- سيتي ماريا محمود

Member of the Selangor State Executive Council
- In office 14 May 2018 – 12 August 2023 (Health, Women and Family Empowerment)
- Monarch: Sharafuddin
- Menteri Besar: Azmin Ali (2018); Amirudin Shari (2018–2023)
- Preceded by: Daroyah Alwi
- Constituency: Seri Serdang

Member of the Selangor State Legislative Assembly for Seri Serdang
- In office 9 May 2018 – 12 August 2023
- Preceded by: Noor Hanim Ismail (PR–PAS)
- Succeeded by: Abbas Salimi Azmi (PH–AMANAH)
- Majority: 14,363 (2018)

Member of the Malaysian Parliament for Kota Raja
- In office 8 March 2008 – 9 May 2018
- Preceded by: Vigneswaran Sanasee (BN–MIC)
- Succeeded by: Mohamad Sabu (PH–AMANAH)
- Majority: 20,751 (2008); 29,395 (2013)

Personal details
- Born: Siti Mariah binti Mahmud; 14 February 1958 (age 68) Kedah, Federation of Malaya (now Malaysia)
- Citizenship: Malaysian
- Party: Malaysian Islamic Party (PAS) (–2015); National Trust Party (AMANAH) (since 2015)
- Other political affiliations: Barisan Alternatif (BA) (–2004); Pakatan Rakyat (PR) (2008–2015); Pakatan Harapan (PH) (since 2015)
- Children: 6
- Education: Cairo University (MBBS); University of London (MSc); National University of Malaysia (MBA)
- Occupation: Politician
- Profession: Physician, lecturer
- Website: drsitimariah.blogspot.com

Siti Mariah binti Mahmud (Jawi: سيتي مارية بنت محمود; born 14 February 1958) is a Malaysian politician, physician and lecturer who served as Member of the Selangor State Executive Council (EXCO) in the Pakatan Harapan (PH) state administration under Menteris Besar Azmin Ali and Amirudin Shari, Member of the Selangor State Legislative Assembly (MLA) for Seri Serdang from May 2018 to August 2023 as well as the Member of Parliament (MP) for Kota Raja from March 2008 to May 2018. She is a member and Vice President of the National Trust Party (AMANAH), a component party of the PH coalition and was a member of the Malaysian Islamic Party (PAS), a component party the Pakatan Rakyat (PR) coalition.

== Education ==
She obtained Bachelor of Medicine (MBBS) from the Cairo University, Master of Physiology from University of London and Master of Business Management (MBA) from National University of Malaysia (UKM).

== Early career ==
Before entering politics, Siti Mariah was a doctor and lecturer.

== Political career ==
Siti Mariah was elected to Parliament in the 2008 Malaysian general election, gaining the seat of Kota Raja from the then-ruling Barisan Nasional (BN) coalition. It was reported that her victory—for the Islamist PAS—came with the support of ethnic Chinese and Indian voters. She was successfully reelected again in the 2013 election but she did not seek a third term reelection for her Kota Raja parliamentary seat in the 2018 election to make way for Mohamad Sabu, the president of AMANAH. She contested and won the Selangor State Legislative Assembly constituency of Seri Serdang instead as AMANAH of PH candidate for the first time.

In 2005, Siti Mariah was the first female candidate for vice-president of PAS, but her candidacy was defeated. She has subsequently been portrayed as representing the "new dynamic progressive voice" of PAS.

== Views ==
=== Disagree with Covid-19 vaccine mandate ===
Siti Mariah, who was a health executive councilor (exco) in Selangor, has expressed disagreement with the implementation of any vaccine mandate. Even though she advocates for vaccination, she does not believe a person should lose their job over it.

=== Supporting the use of Ivermectin for Covid-19 treatment ===
Siti Mariah stirred up controversy when she suggested the use of Ivermectin, a drug generally authorized only for animals, to treat COVID-19. She tweeted about a couple who had recovered from COVID-19 after taking Ivermectin and claimed that there were no side effects. She also posed a question to the Health Director-General about what was wrong with taking this medicine.

However, she later posted a follow-up tweet stating that she was neither pro nor against Ivermectin. She defended her stance by asking why those who are against it wanted to block it, and urged everyone to argue scientifically. Surprisingly, she was unaware of the Ivermectin trials being conducted by the Ministry of Health at the time.

== Personal life ==
She has six children.

== Election results ==
Parliament of Malaysia
Year	Constituency	Candidate	Votes	Pct	Opponent(s)	Votes	Pct	Ballots cast	Majority	Turnout
2004	P111 Kota Raja	Siti Mariah Mahmud (PAS)	16,137	36.57%	Vigneswaran Sanasee (MIC)	24,376	55.24%	44,758	8,239	76.67%
2004	P111 Kota Raja	Siti Mariah Mahmud (PAS)	16,137	36.57%	Krisnasamy Thevarayan (IND)	3,608	8.18%	44,758	8,239	76.67%
2008	P111 Kota Raja	Siti Mariah Mahmud (PAS)	38,630	68.36%	Vigneswaran Sanasee (MIC)	17,879	31.64%	57,323	20,751	79.74%
2013	P111 Kota Raja	Siti Mariah Mahmud (PAS)	59,106	64.51%	Murugesan Sinnandavar (MIC)	29,711	32.43%	92,719	29,395	87.55%
2013	P111 Kota Raja	Siti Mariah Mahmud (PAS)	59,106	64.51%	Uthayakumar Ponnusamy (IND)	2,364	2.58%	92,719	29,395	87.55%
2013	P111 Kota Raja	Siti Mariah Mahmud (PAS)	59,106	64.51%	Azman Idrus (IND)	280	0.31%	92,719	29,395	87.55%

Selangor State Legislative Assembly
Year	Constituency	Candidate	Votes	Pct	Opponent(s)	Votes	Pct	Ballots cast	Majority	Turnout
2018	N29 Seri Serdang	Siti Mariah Mahmud (AMANAH)	27,088	59.71%	Mohamad Satim Diman (UMNO)	12,725	28.05%	46,054	14,363	87.18%
2018	N29 Seri Serdang	Siti Mariah Mahmud (AMANAH)	27,088	59.71%	Noor Hanim Ismail (PAS)	5,552	12.24%	46,054	14,363	87.18%

Parliament of Malaysia
Preceded by S. Vigneswaran M. Sanasee	Member of Parliament for Kota Raja; 8 March 2008–9 May 2018	Succeeded by Mohamad Sabu
