= UNDI18 =

Malaysian civil society organisation

- Persatuan Pengundi Muda (Malay)
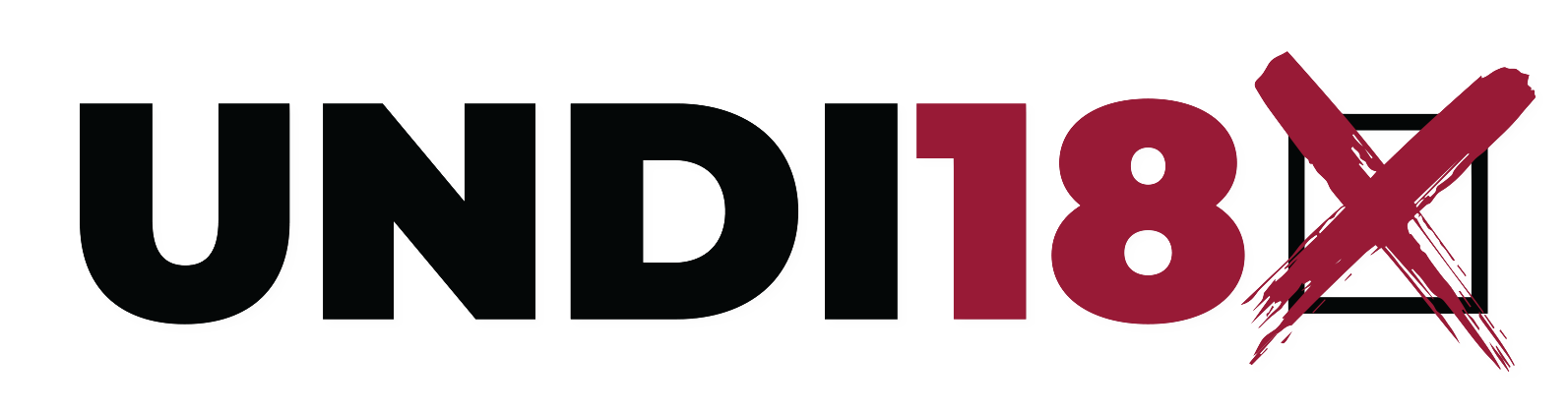
- Formation: April 2017; 9 years ago
- Purpose: Advocacy
- Headquarters: Kuala Lumpur, Malaysia
- Co-founders: Tharma Pillai; Qyira Yusri
- Website: undi18.org

UNDI18 (literal translation: Vote18) is a Malaysian civil society organisation (CSO) focused on Malaysian youth political empowerment, voter education and electoral reform.

UNDI18 is credited for successfully lobbying the Malaysian Parliament to amend the Federal Constitution of Malaysia and pass the Constitution (Amendment) Act 2019 which changed the minimum age for voting from 21 years old to 18 years old. This is notable for being the first Constitutional Amendment in Malaysian history to be supported unanimously in both the Dewan Rakyat and Dewan Negara.

In 2021, UNDI18 also spearheaded the move towards implementation of the lowered voting age after the passage of the constitutional amendment; via a series of protests and a lawsuit against the Federal Government. UNDI18 launched a judicial review application at the Kuching and Kuala Lumpur High Court which successfully mandated the enfranchisement of Malaysians aged from 18 years old to 20 years old after the passage of the Constitution (Amendment) Act 2019.

== History ==
UNDI18 was founded by then-students Tharma Pillai and Qyira Yusri and began in 2016 under the auspices of the Malaysian Students Global Alliance as an initiative to reduce the minimum eligible age for voting in Malaysia from 21 years old to 18 years old. In April 2017, UNDI18 sent a memorandum to the Malaysian Prime Minister Najib Razak advocating for an amendment to Article 119(1)(a) of the Malaysian Federal Constitution which governs the minimum eligible age for voting in Malaysia but was not successful in reforming the minimum voting age at the time.

=== 2019 Malaysian Federal Constitutional Amendment ===
After the 14th Malaysian General Election, the new Pakatan Harapan government led by Mahathir Mohamad started working towards implementing the new minimum voting age in line with the coalition's election manifesto. UNDI18 were able to successfully obtain the endorsement of Minister of Youth and Sports Syed Saddiq as well as bipartisan endorsements from members of Parliament in the opposition bloc to support the reform.

The Constitution (Amendment) Bill 2019 was presented to the Dewan Rakyat and included provisions relating to automatic voter registration for all Malaysian citizens and amendments to the minimum age of candidacy for standing for elections to the Dewan Rakyat and state legislative assemblies in Malaysia.

On 16 July 2019, the Constitution (Amendment) Bill 2019 was passed unanimously by all present members of the Dewan Rakyat and is the first bill in Malaysia's history to have obtained unanimous support in the Dewan Rakyat and Dewan Negara.

=== 2019—2022 State Constitution Amendments ===
Following the amendments to the Federal Constitution lowering the minimum voting age and minimum age of candidacy to stand for election to the Dewan Rakyat, similar amendments to the constitutions of all states in Malaysia were undertaken in order to allow Malaysians aged 18–20 years old to stand for elections to state legislative assemblies in Malaysia. As of December 2022, 12 out of 13 states in Malaysia have amended their state constitutions in order to allow youths aged 18 and above to stand for elections to their respective state legislative assemblies.

Implementation of State Constitutional Amendments Lowering Age of Candidacy
State	Implementation of State Constitutional Amendment	Note
Johor	Unimplemented	Amendment has been passed by the Johor State Legislative Assembly on 6 January 2022, but has not received royal assent from the Sultan of Johor, citing the state government's aim of wanting leaders that are of high quality and knowledgeable.
Kedah	Implemented	Amendment passed by the Kedah State Legislative Assembly on 18 November 2021
Kelantan	Implemented	Amendment passed by the Kelantan State Legislative Assembly on 12 August 2020
Melaka	Implemented	Amendment passed by the Melaka State Legislative Assembly on 2 March 2022
Negeri Sembilan	Implemented	Amendment passed by the Negeri Sembilan State Legislative Assembly on 2 December 2021
Pahang	Implemented	Amendment passed by the Pahang State Legislative Assembly on 10 December 2021
Perak	Implemented	Amendment passed by the Perak State Legislative Assembly on 27 October 2020
Perlis	Implemented	Amendment passed by the Perlis State Legislative Assembly on 21 May 2020
Penang	Implemented	Amendment passed by the Penang State Legislative Assembly on 1 September 2021
Sabah	Implemented	Amendment passed by the Sabah State Legislative Assembly on 21 November 2019
Sarawak	Implemented	Amendment passed by the Sarawak State Legislative Assembly on 12 November 2020
Selangor	Implemented	Amendment passed by the Selangor State Legislative Assembly on 6 December 2021
Terengganu	Implemented	Amendment passed by the Terengganu State Legislative Assembly on 12 August 2020

=== 2021 Mana Undi Kami Protests ===
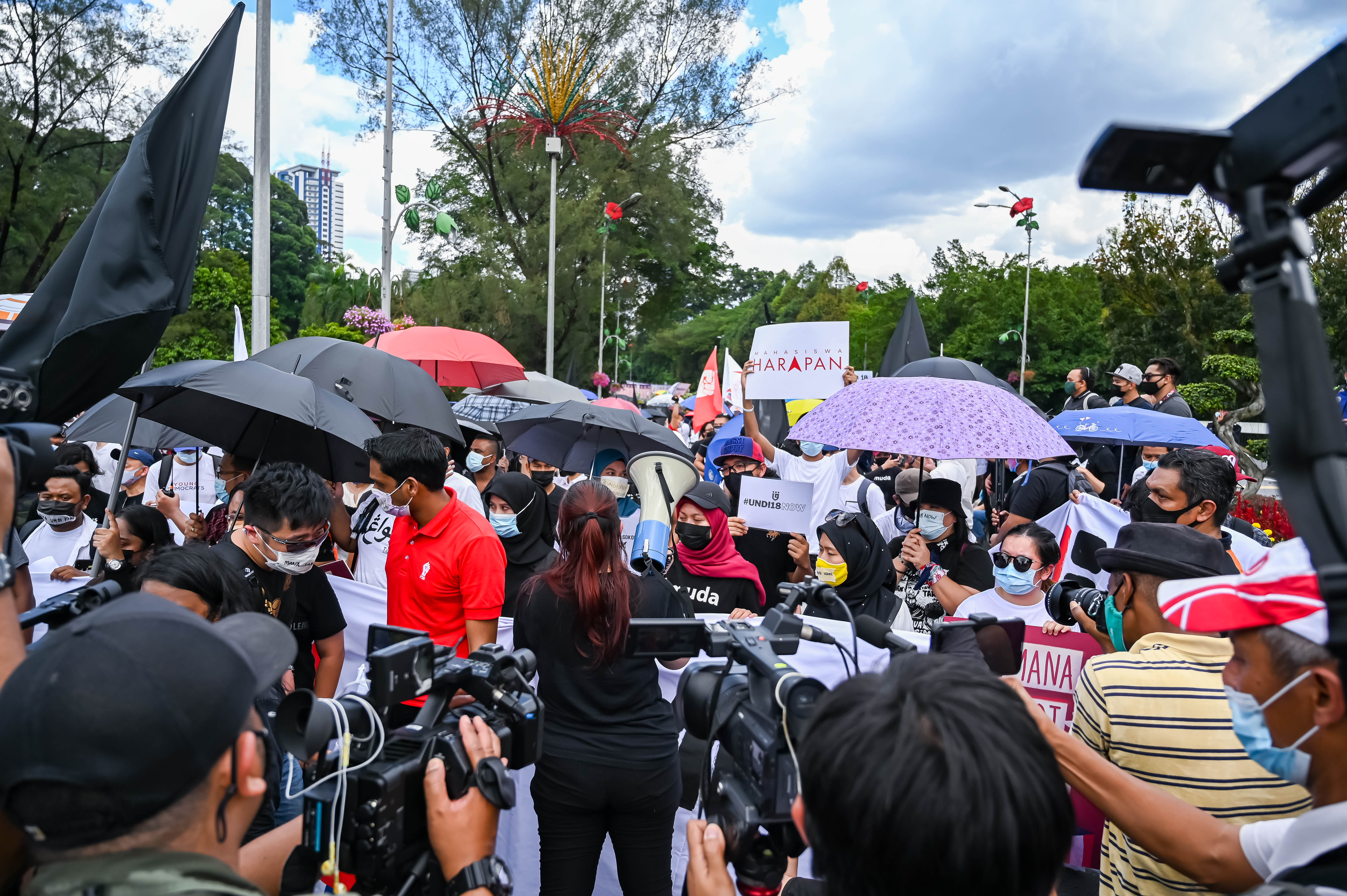
Protestors during the Mana Undi Kami protest at Jalan Parlimen, Kuala Lumpur

The 2020 Sheraton Move in Malaysia led to the fall of the Pakatan Harapan government and the emergence of successive short-term governments. In March 2021, the Perikatan Nasional government announced the postponement of the implementation of the Constitution (Amendment) Act 2019 by the Election Commission and the Minister in the Prime Minister's Department for Law and Parliament. According to the statement by the Election Commission, the Constitution (Amendment) Act 2019 will be implemented in September 2022, instead of the originally set timeline, which was by July 2021.

The first Mana Undi Kami (meaning Where Are Our Votes in Malay) protest took place on 27 March 2021 in response to the delays to the implementation of the constitutional amendment passed in 2019 as well as the suspension of Parliament by Prime Minister, Muhyiddin Yassin. Protestors assembled at Jalan Parlimen with more than 200 people assembling, including representatives from Malaysian political parties and civil society.

=== 2021 Judicial Review Against the Federal Government ===
UNDI18 led two applications of judicial review by a group of 18 Malaysian youths in Kuala Lumpur and 5 youths in Kuching at the Kuala Lumpur and Kuching High Courts, respectively, to challenge the government's action in postponing the implementation of the constitutional amendment.

On 3 September 2022, the Kuching High Court declared the delays in implementation of the constitutional amendments as "irrational and unreasonable" and issued a mandamus order compelling the Malaysian government to implement the constitutional amendments.

The government of Malaysia successfully implemented the constitutional amendment to lower the minimum age of voting and standing for elections to the Dewan Rakyat as well as to implement automatic voter registration on 15 December 2021

== Achievements and Initiatives ==
=== Parlimen Digital ===
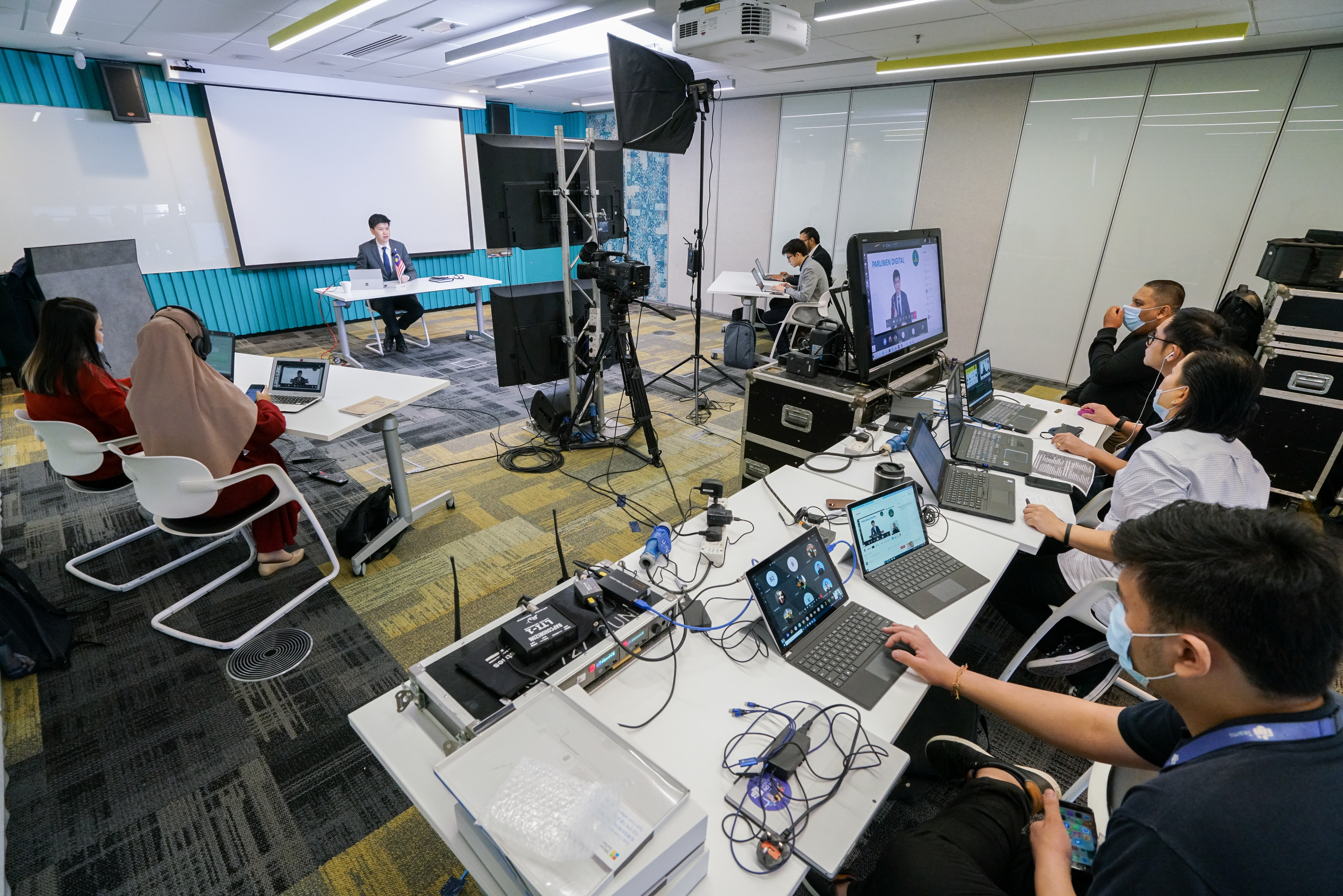
Execution of Parlimen Digital

The COVID-19 pandemic which affected Malaysia in early 2020 led to the suspension of Parliament due to fears of the spread of COVID-19. In response to repeated calls for the Parliament of Malaysia to assemble virtually, UNDI18, in collaboration with other Malaysian youth organisations organised Parlimen Digital, a virtual parliamentary simulation featuring 222 Malaysian youths representing federal parliamentary constituencies in Malaysia who took part in debates and proceedings.

Parlimen Digital took place on 4–5 July 2020 and acted as proof-of-concept for the political acumen of Malaysian youths as well as the feasibility of a virtual parliamentary sitting in lieu of a physical parliamentary sitting for the Malaysian Parliament during the COVID-19 pandemic.

=== Vote Malaysia ===
In conjunction with the 15th Malaysian General Election, UNDI18 along with 13 other youth organisations initiated the Vote Malaysia, a postal voting initiative which was aimed at gathering postal votes from overseas Malaysian voters before sorting and distributing the votes for counting on polling day.

Vote Malaysia collected more than 35,000 postal votes from 25 countries which were counted as part of the 15th Malaysian General Election.
