= Mohamad Satim Diman =

Malaysian politician

Yang Berbahagia Dato' Mohamad Satim Diman DSSA ASA PJK
- محمد صتيم ديمان

State Leader of the Opposition of Selangor
- In office 8 January 2011 – 5 May 2013
- Monarch: Sharafuddin
- Menteri Besar: Khalid Ibrahim (2008–2014)
- Preceded by: Khir Toyo
- Succeeded by: Mohd Shamsudin Lias
- Constituency: Seri Serdang

Member of the Selangor State Legislative Assembly for Seri Serdang
- In office 21 March 2004 – 5 May 2013
- Preceded by: Constituency established
- Succeeded by: Noor Hanim Ismail (PR–PAS)
- Majority: 10,545 (2004); 45 (2008)

Member of the Selangor State Legislative Assembly for Puchong
- In office 25 April 1995 – 21 March 2004
- Preceded by: Constituency established
- Succeeded by: Constituency abolished
- Majority: 12,767 (1995); 4,971 (1999)

Personal details
- Born: Selangor, Malaysia
- Party: United Malays National Organisation (UMNO)
- Other political affiliations: Barisan Nasional (BN)
- Education: Universiti Putra Malaysia (UPM)
- Occupation: Politician

Mohamad Satim bin Diman (Jawi: محمد ساتيم دمن, Malay pronunciation: [mohamad satim]) is a Malaysian politician who served as the Leader of the Opposition of Selangor from June 2008 to January 2011 and a Member of the Selangor State Legislative Assembly (MLA) for Puchong from April 1995 to March 2004 and Seri Serdang from March 2004 to May 2013. He is a member of the United Malays National Organisation (UMNO), a component party of the Barisan Nasional (BN) coalition.

In 2002, he was elected as Deputy Speaker of the Selangor State Legislative Assembly replacing Salamon Selamat who went on served as Mayor of Shah Alam.

== Election results ==
Selangor State Legislative Assembly
Year	Constituency	Candidate	Votes	Pct	Opponent(s)	Votes	Pct	Ballots cast	Majority	Turnout
1995	N29 Puchong	Mohamad Satim Diman (UMNO)	18,516	72.86%	Nadarasa Muthuthamby (DAP)	5,749	22.62%	26,252	12,767	75.53%
1995	N29 Puchong	Mohamad Satim Diman (UMNO)	18,516	72.86%	Abdul Sani Ali (PAS)	1,149	4.52%	26,252	12,767	75.53%
1999	N29 Puchong	Mohamad Satim Diman (UMNO)	17,861	58.08%	Yaakob Sapari (KeADILan)	12,890	41.92%	32,173	4,971	74.67%
2004	N29 Seri Serdang	Mohamad Satim Diman (UMNO)	17,923	70.16%	Yaakob Sapari (PKR)	7,378	28.88%	26,014	10,545	65.55%
2004	N29 Seri Serdang	Mohamad Satim Diman (UMNO)	17,923	70.16%	Mazli Mansor (IND)	246	0.96%	26,014	10,545	65.55%
2008	N29 Seri Serdang	Mohamad Satim Diman (UMNO)	18,932	50.06%	Ahmad Idzam Ahmad (PAS)	18,887	49.94%	38,799	45	77.98%
2018	N29 Seri Serdang	Mohamad Satim Diman (UMNO)	12,725	28.05%	Siti Mariah Mahmud (AMANAH)	27,088	59.71%	46,054	14,363	87.18%
2018	N29 Seri Serdang	Mohamad Satim Diman (UMNO)	12,725	28.05%	Noor Hanim Ismail (PAS)	5,552	12.24%	46,054	14,363	87.18%

== Honours ==
- Selangor
  - Knight Companion of the Order of Sultan Salahuddin Abdul Aziz Shah (DSSA) – Dato' (1997)
  - Member of the Order of Sultan Salahuddin Abdul Aziz Shah (ASA) (1994)
  - Recipient of the Meritorious Service Medal (PJK) (1989)
