= Alam Shah Science Secondary School =

Sains Alam Shah
- SM Sains Alam Shah

Location
- Jalan Yaacob Latif; Bandar Tun Razak; Kuala Lumpur, 56000; Malaysia
- Coordinates: 3°06′21″N 101°43′24″E

Information
- School type: Fully Residential School; High Performance School
- Motto: Malay: Kreatif, Inovatif, Produktif (Creative, Innovative, Productive)
- Established: 16 June 2003
- Status: Public
- Locale: Central Zone
- Authority: Ministry of Education (Malaysia)
- SBP Rank: 14 \ 69 (as in SPM 2022)
- Eponym: Sultan Sir Hisamuddin Alam Shah Al-Haj ibni Almarhum Sultan Alaeddin Sulaiman Shah
- School code: WEA 0247
- Principal: Atan Selamat
- H. Student: Athif Daniyal
- Staff: ± 80
- Grades: Form 1 – Form 5
- Gender: Male only
- Age range: 13–17
- Enrolment: ± 600
- Language: Malay, English, Chinese, Korean, Arabic, Japanese, German
- Classrooms: 4
- Houses: Bendahara; Temenggong; Laksamana; Syahbandar
Colour
- Slogan: Moulding World Class Leaders
- Song: Malay: Menuju Cita
- Nickname: ASiS
- Yearbook: Ekspresif
- Website: sites.google.com/view/asiskl-my

Alam Shah Science School (abbreviated as ASiS; Malay: Sekolah Menengah Sains Alam Shah) is a boarding science secondary school located in Bandar Tun Razak, Kuala Lumpur, Malaysia. The school was established on 16 June 2003 at the former site of Sultan Alam Shah School, which was relocated to Putrajaya.

== History ==
Sekolah Alam Shah, initially located at Kampung Congo (now Bandar Tun Razak), Cheras, Kuala Lumpur, was relocated after its 40th anniversary in 2003 to a new school complex in Putrajaya. On 16 June 2003, Alam Shah Science School was founded at the site in Bandar Tun Razak, named after the Selangor ruler.

The ASiS campus is located on the outskirts of metropolitan Kuala Lumpur, the capital of Malaysia. The school site covers 34 acres (14 ha), comprising three administration and classroom buildings, four hostel blocks, one dining hall, one teachers' apartment, one staff apartment, six teachers' quarters and a principal's bungalow.

Facilities include tennis, futsal, football, basketball courts and rugby field shared with Institut Perguruan Ilmu Khas. ASiS is surrounded by education institutions: the Sekolah Menengah Teknik Kuala Lumpur, Sekolah Menengah Sains Selangor, Sekolah Menengah Kebangsaan Cheras, Institut Perguruan Ilmu Khas, Institut Perguruan Teknik, and the Hospital Universiti Kebangsaan Malaysia. KL Football Stadium, the venue of ASiS' Annual Athletics Day, is also nearby.

The first batch of students, sat for the Sijil Pelajaran Malaysia SPM in 2004 with 84 candidates. Each enrolment may cater for over 200 boys and is divided into three intakes.

The first principal was Tn. Hj. Mohd Idrus bin Abdul Hamid, who officially took up the position on the same day ASiS was inaugurated. The administration board remained unchanged until 2011, when Mohd Idrus retired after eight years. The initial faculty comprised thirteen teachers; some of them, like Mohd Idrus, were previously teachers at Sekolah Alam Shah. On 12 September 2003, 12 more teachers were hired. In 2009, there were 51 ASiS teachers and 22 staff. The number of students reached around 500.

== Principals ==
Years active	Principal name
2003–2011	Idrus Abdul Hamid
2011–2014	Baharudin Burhan
2015–2017	Roslie Ahmad
2017–2021	Norazhar Mohd Shah
2021–2025	Jasmi MD Isa
2026-KINI	Atan Selamat

== Performance ==
ASiS has been in the top ten SBPs in SPM examinations. Nationwide, ASiS places itself in the top ten schools. On 17 February 2011, in an announcement made by Education Minister Muhyiddin Yassin, ASiS was conferred the status of High Performance School, or Sekolah Berprestasi Tinggi (SBT), along with 22 other schools.

== Co-curriculum ==
ASiS has three areas in its curriculum. They are:

1. Science & Innovation
2. English Debate
3. Internationalisation Programme
