= Noor Hanim Ismail =

Malaysian politician

- نور هانيم اسماعيل

Faction represented in Selangor State Legislative Assembly
- 2013–2018: Malaysian Islamic Party

Personal details
- Born: Noor Hanim binti Ismail; 5 October 1962 (age 63) Kuala Kangsar, Perak, Federation of Malaya (now Malaysia)
- Citizenship: Malaysian
- Party: Malaysian Islamic Party (PAS)
- Other political affiliations: Perikatan Nasional (PN); Muafakat Nasional (MN); Pakatan Rakyat (PR)
- Children: 5
- Education: Swansea University
- Occupation: Politician
- Noor Hanim Ismail on Facebook

Noor Hanim binti Ismail (born 5 October 1962) is a Malaysian politician and the former Selangor State Assemblywoman representing Seri Serdang from May 2013 to May 2018 for Malaysian Islamic Party (PAS) in the Pakatan Rakyat (PR) opposition coalition.

== Election results ==
Selangor State Legislative Assembly
Year	Constituency	Candidate	Votes	Pct	Opponent(s)	Votes	Pct	Ballots cast	Majority	Turnout
2013	N29 Seri Serdang	Noor Hanim Ismail (PAS)	39,737	62.85%	Mohamad Yusof Mohamed Yasin (UMNO)	23,486	37.15%	64,176	16,251	88.19%
2018	N29 Seri Serdang	Noor Hanim Ismail (PAS)	5,552	12.24%	Siti Mariah Mahmud (AMANAH)	27,088	59.71%	46,054	14,363	87.18%
2018	N29 Seri Serdang	Noor Hanim Ismail (PAS)	5,552	12.24%	Mohamad Satim Diman (UMNO)	12,725	28.05%	46,054	14,363	87.18%
