= Seri Serdang =

Seri Serdang (N29)
Selangor constituency

State constituency
- Legislature: Selangor State Legislative Assembly
MLA
Abbas Salimi Azmi
PH
- Constituency created: 2003
- First contested: 2004
- Last contested: 2023

Demographics
- Population (2020): 244,929
- Electors (2023): 93,235

Seri Serdang is a state constituency in Selangor, Malaysia, that has been represented in the Selangor State Legislative Assembly since 2004.

The state constituency was created in the 2003 redistribution and is mandated to return a single member to the Selangor State Legislative Assembly under the first past the post voting system.

== Demographics ==
Ethnic breakdown of Seri Serdang's electorate as of 2023
1. Malay (55.2%)
2. Chinese (29.5%)
3. Indian (12.3%)
4. Other ethnicities (3.09%)

== History ==
=== Polling districts ===
According to the gazette issued on 30 March 2018, the Seri Serdang constituency has a total of 14 polling districts.

State constituency	Polling districts	Code	Location
Seri Serdang（N29）	Serdang Jaya 1	103/29/01	Stadium Tertutup Majlis Bandaraya Subang Jaya Serdang Jaya
Seri Serdang（N29）	Seri Serdang Utara	103/29/02	SKM Seri Indah Taman Sri Serdang
Seri Serdang（N29）	Kawasan UPM	103/29/03	SK Serdang
Seri Serdang（N29）	Kampung Sri Aman	103/29/04	SA Rakyat Al-Aman (KAFA Integrasi Al-Aman) Kampung Sri Aman
Seri Serdang（N29）	Batu 14 Puchong	103/29/05	SMK Puchong Batu 14
Seri Serdang（N29）	Seri Serdang Selatan 1	103/29/06	SMK Seri Serdang
Seri Serdang（N29）	Bandar Bukit Puchong	103/29/07	SJK (C) Han Ming Puchong
Seri Serdang（N29）	Taman Puchong Utama	103/29/08	SK Puchong Utama 2
Seri Serdang（N29）	Taman Pinggiran Putra	103/29/09	SJK (C) Bukit Serdang
Seri Serdang（N29）	Serdang Jaya 2	103/29/10	SJK (C) Serdang Baru (2) Seri Kembangan
Seri Serdang（N29）	Puchong Permai	103/29/11	SMK Puchong Perdana
Seri Serdang（N29）	Seri Indah	103/29/12	Balai Masyarakat Taman Puchong Perdana Jalan Perdana 4/2A
Seri Serdang（N29）	Seri Serdang Selatan 2	103/29/13	KAFA Integrasi Manbul 'Ulum Taman Seri Serdang
Seri Serdang（N29）	Kampung Batu 13	103/29/14	SRA Bt 13 (Kampung Kenangan) Puchong

=== Representation history ===
Members of the Legislative Assembly for Seri Serdang
Assembly	No	Years	Member	Party
Constituency created from Pucung
11th	N29	2004–2008	Mohamad Satim Diman	BN (UMNO)
12th	N29	2008–2013	Mohamad Satim Diman	BN (UMNO)
13th	N29	2013–2018	Noor Hanim Ismail	PR (PAS)
14th	N29	2018–2023	Siti Mariah Mahmud	PH (AMANAH)
15th	N29	2023–present	Abbas Salimi Azmi	PH (AMANAH)

== Election results ==
Selangor state election, 2023: Seri Serdang
Party	Candidate	Votes	%	∆%
PH	Abbas Salimi Azmi	37,411	56.77	▼2.94
PN	Mohd Shukor Mustaffa	26,659	40.45	▲40.45
MUDA	Amir Hariri Abdul Hadi	1,834	2.78	▲2.78
Total valid votes		65,904	100.00	
Total rejected ballots		296		
Unreturned ballots		148		
Turnout		66,348	71.16	▼16.02
Registered electors		93,235		
Majority		10,752	16.32	▼15.34
PH hold		Swing		

Selangor state election, 2018: Seri Serdang
Party	Candidate	Votes	%	∆%
PKR	Siti Mariah Mahmud	27,088	59.71	▲59.71
BN	Mohammad Satim Diman	12,725	28.05	▼9.10
PAS	Noor Hanim Ismail	5,552	12.24	▼50.61
Total valid votes		45,365	100.00	
Total rejected ballots		355		
Unreturned ballots		334		
Turnout		46,054	87.18	▼1.01
Registered electors		52,826		
Majority		14,363	31.66	▲5.96
PKR gain from PAS		Swing		?

Selangor state election, 2013: Seri Serdang
Party	Candidate	Votes	%	∆%
PAS	Noor Hanim Ismail	39,737	62.85	▲12.91
BN	Mohamad Yusof Mohamed Yasin	23,486	37.15	▼12.91
Total valid votes		63,223	100.00	
Total rejected ballots		798		
Unreturned ballots		155		
Turnout		64,176	88.19	▲10.21
Registered electors		72,769		
Majority		16,251	25.70	▲25.58
PAS gain from BN		Swing		?
Source(s) "Federal Government Gazette - Notice of Contested Election, State Legislative Assembly for the State of Selangor [P.U. (B) 192/2013]" (PDF). Attorney General's Chambers of Malaysia. 26 April 2013. Archived from the original (PDF) on 2019-12-29. "Federal Government Gazette - Results of Contested Election and Statements of the Poll after the Official Addition of Votes, State Constituencies for the State of Selangor [P.U. (B) 233/2013]". Attorney General's Chambers of Malaysia. 22 May 2013. Archived from the original (PDF) on 2018-10-02. "Federal Government Gazette - Results of Contested Election and Statements of the Poll after the Official Addition of Votes, State Constituencies for the State of Selangor Corrigendum [P.U. (B) 256/2013]" (PDF). Attorney General's Chambers of Malaysia. 31 May 2013.

Selangor state election, 2008: Seri Serdang
Party	Candidate	Votes	%	∆%
BN	Mohamad Satim Diman	18,932	50.06	▼20.10
PAS	Ahmad Idzam Ahmad	18,887	49.94	▲49.94
Total valid votes		37,819	100.00	
Total rejected ballots		827		
Unreturned ballots		153		
Turnout		38,799	77.98	▲12.43
Registered electors		49,757		
Majority		45	0.12	▼67.16
BN hold		Swing		

Selangor state election, 2004: Seri Serdang
Party	Candidate	Votes	%
BN	Mohamad Satim Diman	17,923	70.16
PKR	Yaakop Sapari	7,378	28.88
Independent	Mazli Mansor	246	0.96
Total valid votes		25,547	100.00
Total rejected ballots		389	
Unreturned ballots		78	
Turnout		26,014	65.55
Registered electors		39,688	
Majority		10,545	67.28
This was a new constituency created.
