= Amira Aisya Abdul Aziz =

Malaysian politician

- اميرا عائشة عبدالعزيز
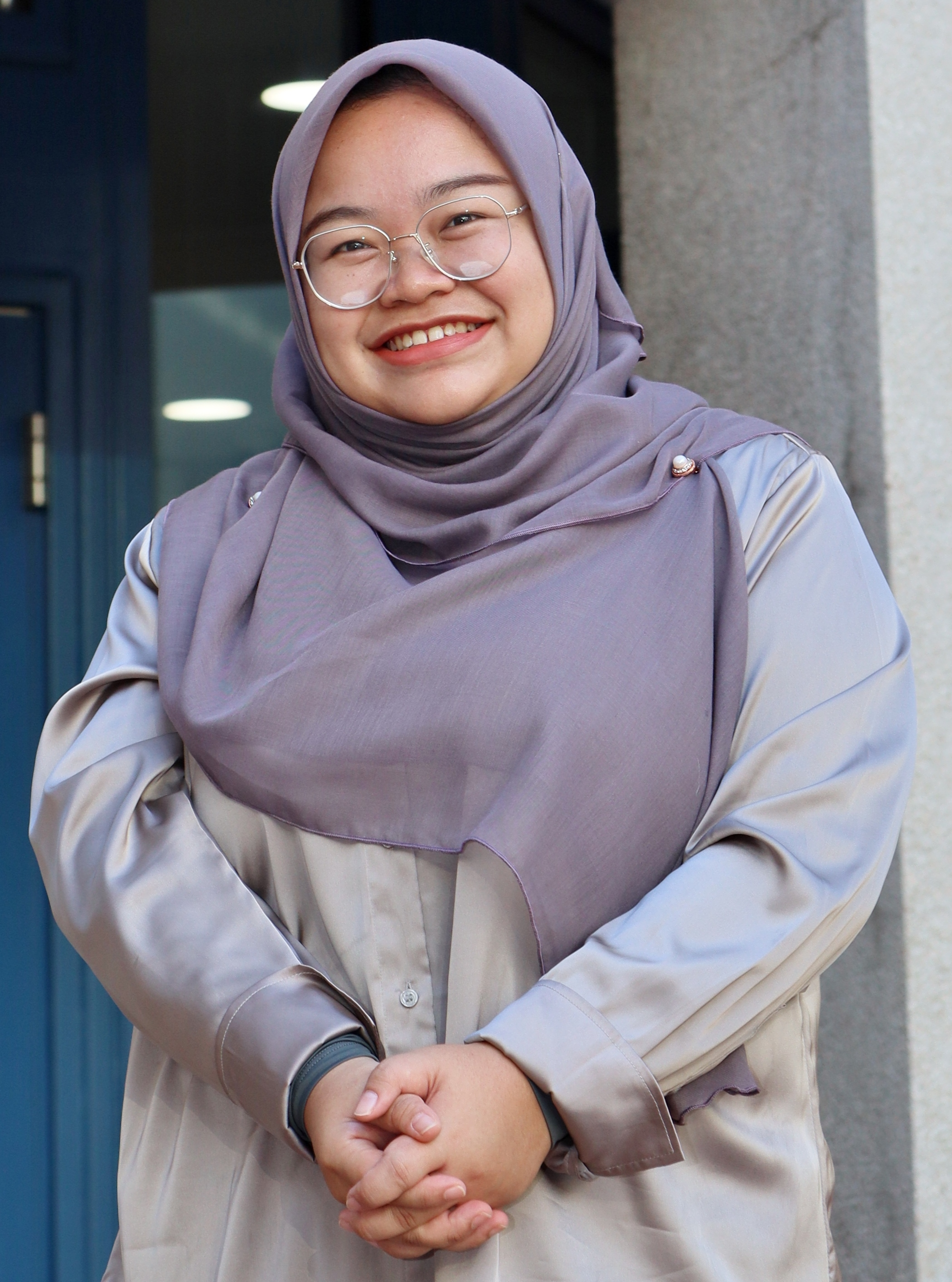
- Amira in 2023

Member of the Johor State Legislative Assembly for Puteri Wangsa
- In office 12 March 2022 – 11 July 2026
- Preceded by: Mazlan Bujang (PH–BERSATU)
- Succeeded by: Maszlee Malik (PH–PKR)
- Majority: 7,114 (2022)
Party leadership roles
President of the Malaysian United Democratic Alliance
Acting
Assumed office 9 November 2023
Preceded by	Syed Saddiq
1st Deputy President of the Malaysian United Democratic Alliance
Incumbent
Assumed office 24 July 2022
President	Syed Saddiq
Preceded by	Position established
2nd Secretary-General of the Malaysian United Democratic Alliance
In office 24 August 2021 – 24 July 2022
President	Syed Saddiq
Preceded by	Amir Hariri Abdul Hadi
Succeeded by	Amir Hariri Abdul Hadi

Personal details
- Born: Amira Aisya binti Abdul Aziz; 14 February 1995 (age 31) Kampung Melayu Majidee, Johor Bahru, Johor, Malaysia
- Party: MUDA (since 2020)
- Other political affiliations: Pakatan Harapan (2022–2023)
- Spouse: Luqman Long (m. 2024)
- Education: International Islamic University Malaysia (LLB)
- Occupation: Politician
- Website: amiraaisya.com
- Nickname: Amira Aisya

Amira Aisya binti Abdul Aziz (Jawi: اميرا عائشة بنت عبدالعزيز; born 14 February 1995) is a Malaysian politician who served as Member of the Johor State Legislative Assembly (MLA) for Puteri Wangsa from 2022 to 2026. She is a co-founder and member of the Malaysian United Democratic Alliance (MUDA). She has also served as the Acting President of MUDA since the resignation of Syed Saddiq in November 2023 and the 1st Deputy President of MUDA since July 2022. She served as the 2nd Secretary-General of MUDA from August 2021 to July 2022. During her time in office, she was the youngest MLA of Johor, the first female Puteri Wangsa MLA and the only MLA from her party.

== Early life and education ==
Amira was born in Kampung Melayu Majidee, Johor Bahru, Johor, Malaysia in 1995. Amira and her 4 siblings were raised by their single mother, Rosita Manas. Amira's father died in 2007 when Amira was only 12. Amira received primary and secondary education at Sultan Ibrahim Girls School, Johor Bahru and later furthered her studies at International Islamic University Malaysia (IIUM) and obtained a Master's degree in law.

Amira was one of the members of the Johor Student Leaders Council (JSLC) when she was 16 and later became one of the strategic planners and members of advisory panel at the Johor Student Leaders Council Alumni (JSLCA) when she was 18. At the same year, Amira also became the youngest member of the National Children Consultant and Legal Counsel Council. Amira has trained 10,000 student leaders in the entire Johor and was a model director of Johor of the United Nations (UN) during her time in JSLCA. Amira also helped in the success of the first UN model of daily school students as she believed that national school students have the same rights as private school students.

Amira was also appointed leadership trainer for the Treasure Ambassador Programme 3.0, which is a social entrepreneurship programme for the university students of Johor. After ending her training in Chambers, Amira started work at the Education Performance And Delivery Unit (PADU) under the Ministry of Education which focuses the policies and research of the implementation of the national education plan. Amira headed the 21st century educational initiative and literation and numeration initiatives. Amira was also co-director in Youth Kuala Lumpur Summit in 2019. When she ended her service in PADU, Amira served as a research officer in the federal constituency of Muar since 2020.

== Political career ==
On 17 September 2020, Amira co-founded MUDA with former Minister of Youth and Sports and present Muar Member of Parliament (MP) Syed Saddiq Syed Abdul Rahman with the latter as party president after being removed from the Malaysian United Indigenous Party (BERSATU) together with former Prime Minister Mahathir Mohamad by then Prime Minister and BERSATU president Muhyiddin Yassin after their fallout in political affiliations.

On 25 August 2021, Amir Hariri Abdul Hadi announced his resignation as the 1st Secretary-General of MUDA and Amira was appointed to take over him as the new and 2nd Secretary-General of MUDA effective a day before on 24 August 2021 as the former was going to the United Kingdom (UK) to further his studies. Exactly 11 months later on 24 July 2022, MUDA declared Amira as its 1st Deputy President and announced the comeback of Amir Hariri as its 3rd Secretary-General to replace Amira with immediate effect.

On 14 February 2022, she was unveiled as the candidate of MUDA for Puteri Wangsa state seat in the 2022 Johor state election by party president Syed Saddiq. Amira believes that Johor State Legislative Assembly needs leaders who focus on "politics of service" for the people of Johor and the fair and just policies for Johor to thrive prosperously and successfully. On 12 March 2022, Amira contested for the Puteri Wangsa state seat in Johor on MUDA ticket after MUDA began political cooperation with PH in the state election. She faced opponents Ng Yew Aik from Barisan Nasional (BN) and Malaysian Chinese Association (MCA), Loh Kah Yong from Perikatan Nasional (PN) and Parti Gerakan Rakyat Malaysia (GERAKAN), Choong Shiau Yoon from Parti Bangsa Malaysia (PBM) who is also Tebrau MP, Khairil Anwar Razali from the Homeland Fighters Party (PEJUANG) as well as another independent Adzrin Adam. She went on to defeat all of her opponents and win the Puteri Wangsa state seat with the total number of 22,884 votes and by a majority of 7,114 votes. Following her electoral victory, she became the first and sole MLA from the party which made its electoral debut in the election and second member of a legislature after Syed Saddiq as well as the first candidate to win on the MUDA ticket in election.

== Controversies and issues ==
On 10 February 2022, an internal dispute involving MUDA and PH component parties People's Justice Party (PKR) and National Trust Party (AMANAH) emerged as a result of MUDA being allocated the Puteri Wangsa state seat for the 2022 Johor state election. Napsiah Khamis, the Women's Chief of PKR Johor, claimed that her party's grassroots leaders had worked hard on the ground in Puteri Wangsa to restore support for PH since the seat went to PN in February 2020 after its MLA Mazlan Bujang left PH together with Muhyiddin for PN. Puteri Wangsa was initially allocated to AMANAH following several rounds of tough negotiations. According to Napsiah, PKR Johor decided to allow AMANAH to contest in Puteri Wangsa as the initial plan was to nominate assembly speaker Suhaizan Kayat (who is from AMANAH) to contest for the seat. Napsiah then lashed out the disappointment of Johor PKR grassroots at AMANAH for easily giving up the chance to contest for it to MUDA. This is considering that PKR initially also wanted to contest there, but they let AMANAH contest to prevent internal conflicts.

Napsiah also did not deny that she was initially speculated to contest the Puteri Wangsa seat, which she claimed was easy for PH or MUDA to gain victory. She also expressed deep regret that they have lost the chance to contest for the seat despite their efforts to restore support in Puteri Wangsa. Napsiah also accused Amira for being unprepared to contest due to lack of knowledge about politics, political experience and election machinery to contest, as well as questioning the standards of MUDA on choosing candidates and seats to contest. Nevertheless, she clarified on whether or not the PKR grassroots would boycott MUDA in the state election, she would still abide by all decisions made by the leadership of PKR and played down the issue that she was just expressing the sentiments of the PKR grassroots on AMANAH's disrespectfulness.

On another issue, Napsiah also stressed that she was too busy to entertain Amira and expressed her annoyance about Amira who kept on messaging her about election preparations and told Amira to wait till she was free. Amira then openly apologised to Napsiah for her disturbance and clarified that she did that in her capacity as MUDA secretary-general. Amira noted that she always respected those that had been in politics for a long time. She also hoped to carry on communications with Napsiah in the spirit of friendship and mutual respect and to move forward. On 28 February and 5 March 2022, during the state election campaigning period, her electoral materials like her billboards suffered from heavy vandalism. On 6 March 2022, she said she was unfazed by spelling out that she would not back down as she wanted to promote "mature politics" and she has also lodged a police report. She also noted that this was exactly why she entered politics, which was to ensure that these behaviours were not normalised.

In January 2024, Amira was pictured with Naimah Khalid, the wife of tycoon Daim Zanuddin at the Kuala Lumpur Sessions Court to show support for her as a party member. Naimah was charged with failing to comply with a Malaysian Anti-Corruption Commission asset declaration and failing to declare her ownership of companies, several plots of land in Kuala Lumpur and in Penang, as well as two vehicles.

Amira clarified that her presence in court was to support a party member and friend, not because she was a beneficiary of, or involved with, the financial activities for which they were under investigation. She also denied that Daim was the party's biggest founder.

== Election results ==
Johor State Legislative Assembly
Year	Constituency	Name	Votes	Pct	Opponent(s)	Votes	Pct	Ballots cast	Majority	Turnout
2022	N41 Puteri Wangsa	Amira Aisya Abdul Aziz (MUDA)	22,884	43.22%	Ng Yew Aik (MCA)	15,770	29.78%	52,948	7,114	46.94%
2022	N41 Puteri Wangsa	Amira Aisya Abdul Aziz (MUDA)	22,884	43.22%	Loh Kah Yong (Gerakan)	8,957	16.92%	52,948	7,114	46.94%
2022	N41 Puteri Wangsa	Amira Aisya Abdul Aziz (MUDA)	22,884	43.22%	Choong Shiau Yoon (PBM)	2,471	4.67%	52,948	7,114	46.94%
2022	N41 Puteri Wangsa	Amira Aisya Abdul Aziz (MUDA)	22,884	43.22%	Khairil Anwar Razali (PEJUANG)	2,468	4.66%	52,948	7,114	46.94%
2022	N41 Puteri Wangsa	Amira Aisya Abdul Aziz (MUDA)	22,884	43.22%	Adzrin Adam (IND)	398	0.75%	52,948	7,114	46.94%

== See also ==
- 2020–2022 Malaysian political crisis
- Puteri Wangsa (state constituency)
- Impact of the COVID-19 pandemic on politics in Malaysia

Political offices
Preceded by Mazlan Bujang	Member of the Johor State Legislative Assembly for Puteri Wangsa; 2022–present	Incumbent
