= Arumugam Vijiaratnam =

Singaporean sportsperson

Arumugam Vijiaratnam (24 August 1921 – 18 February 2016) was the only Singaporean who represented his country in four sports — hockey, cricket, football and rugby — doing so from 1946 to 1956. He was the first Singaporean engineer. A top civil servant, Vijiaratnam represented Singapore at the 1956 Melbourne Olympic Games in hockey, where he was instrumental in the 6-1 rout of the United States.

== Education ==
Born in Ipoh, Malaysia, Vijiaratnam studied in Victoria School in Singapore from 1937 to 1940. He was one of the first government scholars to demonstrate that sports and studies could be balanced successfully. He was awarded government scholarships to study engineering at Kuala Lumpur Technical College in 1941 and Brighton College of Advanced Technology in 1950 where he graduated with an engineering degree. He captained the hockey and cricket teams at the Brighton College of Advanced Technology.

== Career ==
After he returned to Singapore in 1953, he worked for the Public Works Department until he was seconded to the Port of Singapore Authority (PSA) in 1964. He played a key role in PSA's formation, helping to develop its containerisation programme, and rose to become its chief engineer. He worked in PSA for 17 years and was one of two key men who were instrumental in reclamation works for Changi Airport, a feat that drew mention in Singapore's founding father, Lee Kuan Yew's Memoirs, From Third World to First: The Singapore Story. He later returned to PSA and retired from there as the director of engineering at the age of 75.

Vijiaratnam became the first Pro-Chancellor of Nanyang Technological University in 1992 and served until 2005. He was also chairman of Tamil Murasu for ten years from 1995, and served on the Presidential Council for Minority Rights from 1994 to 2001. He was also the first Asian to serve as vice-president of the Britain-based Institution of Structural Engineers.

Vijiaratnam died peacefully at his home in Maryland Drive, off Holland Road, in 2016. He left behind a son, Vijendran, and 3 daughters. His wife, Yogasoundary, died in 2011.

== Book ==
A book about his life, "Engineered For Success", was launched in March 2016.
