= Technical Institute of Kuala Lumpur =

School in Bandar Tun Razak, Kuala Lumpur, Malaysia

Coordinates: 3.1035977°N 101.72273°E

Sekolah Menengah Teknik Kuala Lumpur
- Bandar Tun Razak, Federal Territory of Kuala Lumpur; Malaysia

Information
- Type: Government-aided technical school, cluster school
- Motto: Bertugas Hidup Berjasa
- Established: 1926
- Principal: En. Ahmad Nzryshah Bin Mohamed Khaled (2022-now)
- Grades: Form 4 and Form 5
- Enrollment: 880 (650 hostel student)
- Student Union/Association: Grizzly(2012-2013) Titans(2013-2014) Rhinox(2014-2015) Sabers(2015-2016) Velox(2016-2017) Maestro(2017-2018) Griffin(2018-2019) Aztec(2019-2020) Sentoki(2020-2021) Olmec(2021-2022) Savant(2022-2023) Vicious(2023-2024) Astra(2024-2025) Novus(2025-2026) Centrix(2026-2027)
- Colours: Alfa Yellow, Delta Red, Gamma Green, and Beta Blue
- Yearbook: Teknika
- Abbreviation: TiKL
- Website: smtkl.moe.edu.my

Technical Institute of Kuala Lumpur (TiKL) (Malay: Sekolah Menengah Teknik Kuala Lumpur), is a technical and cluster school located in Bandar Tun Razak, Cheras, Kuala Lumpur and it's the oldest technical school in Malaysia that was founded in 1926.

== History ==
The establishment of TiKL can be traced back in 1926. In 1927, The Federated Malay State Government Trade School was created after the Federated Malay States government wished to train skilled workers in technical fields by Mr Noel Leembruggen, an ILO officer and engineer and Mr. Geary, a superintendent. The first site for the school was located at Jalan Kolam Air with only seven staff. In 1946, the school changed its name to Junior Technical Trade School with enrolment of 80 students.

Its name was changed again to Technical Institute after the Report of the Education Committee in 1956 (known as 'Penyata Razak') which also suggested that the school transform into a full secondary school which offered its students basic technical skill for the Lower Certificate of Education (LCE) holders. The first batch of students for the Technical Institute was enrolled in February 1957 with Mr. Lai Nyen Foo as the principal. The teachers then were Mr Rozario, Mr Takashi Mori Jr., Mr.Vivien Voo, Mr. Lee Hoch Siew. Mr Leembruggen (1957/58), Mr Wong Voon Kong, Mr Cheong, Mr. Danial, Mr. Zaki, Mr How Chin Cheong and a few more. The first batch graduated in December 1959. Finally in 1962, the school changed its name to Sekolah Menengah Teknik Kuala Lumpur.

In 1967 TiKL moved out from Jalan Kolam Air to Jalan Tenteram (now known as Jalan Yaacob Latiff), Bandar Tun Razak. Other institutions located along this road are Sekolah Menengah Sains Alam Shah (previously Sekolah Alam Shah which was then moved to Putrajaya and changed its name to Sekolah Sultan Alam Shah) and Sekolah Menengah Sains Selangor.

== Notable alumni ==
- Arumugam Vijiaratnam - Singaporean engineer and Olympic athlete (football and rugby)
- Mohamed Azmin Ali
