= Standing Orders of the Dewan Rakyat =

Parliamentary rules

The Standing Orders of the Dewan Rakyat are used by the Dewan Rakyat, the lower chamber of the Parliament of Malaysia as its primary procedural authority. The Standing Orders are made by the Dewan Rakyat in pursuance of Article 162 of the Federal Constitution.
