= Pucung (state constituency) =

Selangor constituency

Defunct state constituency
- Legislature: Selangor State Legislative Assembly
- Constituency created: 1994
- Constituency abolished: 2004
- First contested: 1995
- Last contested: 1999

Pucung was a state constituency in Selangor, Malaysia, that was represented in the Selangor State Legislative Assembly from 1995 to 2004.

The state constituency was created in the 1994 redistribution and was mandated to return a single member to the Selangor State Legislative Assembly under the first past the post voting system.

== History ==
It was abolished in 2004 when it was redistributed.

=== Representation history ===
Members of the Legislative Assembly for Pucung
Assembly	No	Years	Member	Party
Constituency created from Serdang
9th	N29	1995-1999	Mohamad Satim Diman	BN (UMNO)
10th	N29	1999-2004	Mohamad Satim Diman	BN (UMNO)
Constituency abolished, split into Seri Serdang and Kinrara

== Election results ==
Selangor state election, 1999
Party	Candidate	Votes	%	∆%
BN	Mohamad Satim Diman	17,861	58.08	▼14.78
PKR	Yaakop Sapari	12,890	41.92	▲41.92
Total valid votes		30,751	100.00	
Total rejected ballots		852		
Unreturned ballots		570		
Turnout		32,173	74.67	▼0.86
Registered electors		43,086		
Majority		4,971	16.16	▼34.08
BN hold		Swing		

Selangor state election, 1995
Party	Candidate	Votes	%
BN	Mohamad Satim Diman	18,516	72.86
DAP	Nadarasa Muthuthamby	5,749	22.62
PAS	Abdul Sani Ali	1,149	4.52
Total valid votes		25,414	100.00
Total rejected ballots		483	
Unreturned ballots		355	
Turnout		26,252	75.53
Registered electors		34,759	
Majority		12,767	50.24
This was a new constituency created.
