= Malaysian United Democratic Alliance =

Political party of Malaysia

- Malay name: Ikatan Demokratik Malaysia
- Abbreviation: MUDA
- President: Amira Aisya Abdul Aziz
- Deputy President: Zaidel Baharuddin
- Vice President: Leben Siddarth; Faezrah Rizalman; Dobby Chew; Zarul Afiq; Siva Prakash
- Secretary-General: Ainie Haziqah
- Founders: Afiqah Zulkifli; Amir Hariri Abdul Hadi; Mathen Nair; Teo Lee Ken; Thanussha Francis Xavier; Lim Wei Jiet; Luqman Long; Mutalib Uthman; Radzi Tajuddin; Shahrizal Denci; Siti Rahayu Baharin; Syed Saddiq Syed Abdul Rahman; Tarmizi Anuwar
- Founded: 17 September 2020
- Registered: 23 December 2021
- Split from: BERSATU
- Headquarters: Rumah Hitam, Pejabat MUDA; D-2-08, Jalan SS 6/20a, Dataran Glomac, Pusat Bandar Kelana Jaya; 47301 Petaling Jaya, Selangor
- Student wing: Ikatan Mahasiswa Demokratik Malaysia
- Membership (2022): 79,980
- Ideology: Social democracy; Populism
- Political position: Centre-left
- National affiliation: Electoral pact Blok Progresif (since 2023) (Note: The party supported Warisan Plus (2020–2021), and was part of electoral pact with Pakatan Harapan (2020–2023) and National Unity Government (2022-2023))
- Colours: Black and gold
- Slogan: Budi – Tara – Serta
- Anthem: Muda Sudah Mula
- Dewan Negara: 0 / 70
- Dewan Rakyat: 1 / 222
- State Legislative Assemblies: 0 / 612
- Chief ministers of states: 0 / 13

Election symbol

Party flag

Website
- muda.my

The Malaysian United Democratic Alliance (Malay: Ikatan Demokratik Malaysia), abbreviated as MUDA (meaning "young" in Malay), is a multi-racial, youth-centric political party in Malaysia. Founded in September 2020 by Syed Saddiq Syed Abdul Rahman, MUDA advocates for social democracy. The party is known for its focus on inclusivity, innovation, and reform.

== History ==
=== Formation ===
The Malaysian United Democratic Alliance was formed by Syed Saddiq Syed Abdul Rahman in September 2020. Previously, Syed Saddiq served as Minister of Youth and Sports in the Pakatan Harapan (PH) administration. He was the youngest-ever Malaysian politician in a Cabinet post when appointed in 2018 at the age of 25. He is also the Member of Parliament (MP) for Muar, and originally a member of the Malaysian United Indigenous Party (BERSATU), but his party membership was terminated amid the February 2020 Sheraton Move, along with four other MPs including ex-Prime Minister Mahathir Mohamad. Mahathir later formed the Homeland Fighters' Party (PEJUANG) but Syed Saddiq declined to join Mahathir's new party. On 17 September 2020, he formally applied to register his own new party with Registrar of Societies (RoS). At the time of 2020 political crisis, Malaysian politicians had been fighting for control of parliament, with the PN coalition holding a very thin majority.

MUDA has been sponsored by Syed Saddiq, Amir Abd Hadi, Dr. Tanussha Francis Xavier, Sharizal Denci, Afiqah Zulkifli, Lim Wei Jiet, Luqman Long, Radzi Tajuddin, Tarmizi Anuwar, Dr. Mathen Muniasupran, Mutalib Uthman, Siti Rahayu Baharin and Dr. Teo Lee Ken. Syed Saddiq has stated that MUDA is modeled after two other political parties: La Republique En Marche! of France and the now-defunct Future Forward Party of Thailand. He has also stated that his party will be multi-racial and youth-based, representing "all levels of society, regardless of race, religion or age". The formation of this party follows a trend of millennial-based political parties in South East Asia, such as the Indonesian Solidarity Party in Indonesia and the Future Forward Party in Thailand. MUDA seeks to be disruptive and pro-democracy, with policies based on reform and modern ideals, championing diversity, inclusivity and innovation.. It targets "middle Malaysia" with promises of "meritocratic, racially inclusive and policy-driven governance", and is also targeting the unregistered electorate.

=== Rejected registration and court case ===
MUDA's registration was rejected by the RoS on 6 January 2021 via a RoS email, in which no reason was given for the rejection. On 12 January, MUDA through its 13 pro-tem committee, including Syed Saddiq, sought a court order to reverse the decision of Minister of Home Affairs and for the RoS to register it. Judge Mariana Yahya had set the date 4 February 2021 after hearing arguments from MUDA's lawyers' team the High Court of Malaysia to decide whether to allow MUDA a judicial review against the government decision. The lawyers representing MUDA are former attorney-general Tommy Thomas, Ambiga Sreenevasan and Lim Wei Jiet.

Syed Saddiq claims the Home Affairs Minister Hamzah Zainudin had told him that his party would be registered and approved if he pledged to support the ruling Perikatan Nasional (PN) coalition. He also claims that Hamzah had asked him to refrain from voting on government bills he opposed as part of the deal. MUDA also alleged that the rejection was PN government's agenda to prevent it from participating in the next general election.

On 4 February, the High Court again dismissed a leave application by MUDA in its challenge to the rejection of its application as a political party. On the same day, MUDA filed a judicial review application, MUDA has questioned the RoS for still doing background checks on the party and not approving its application as a political party albeit after six months on 25 March. MUDA was allowed by the High Court to go ahead with a judicial review against the government's refusal to register it as a political party on 21 September. The High Court, during case management, fixed 14 December to hear the application. The High Court has ordered the Home Affairs Ministry to allow the registration within 14 days on 14 December.

=== Legalised and registered ===
Following the lawsuit, MUDA was finally registered as an official political party after its registration was approved by the RoS on 23 December 2021. As of 23 December 2021, the party is already listed as active by the RoS website. The successful registration allows the use of the party logo officially to contest future political elections. It was publicly announced only on 29 December 2021 as the event coincided with December 2021 Malaysian floods relief operations that involved the new party.

First MUDA logo before 2024

=== 2022 Johor state election ===
On 29 January 2022, MUDA confirmed its intention to participate in the Johor state election.

On 9 February 2022, DAP, AMANAH and MUDA signed an agreement unveiling the outcomes of their cooperation on seat negotiations by declaring that they will not contest against each other, with MUDA getting 6 seats previously allocated to DAP and AMANAH ranging from Tenang, Bukit Kepong, Parit Raja, Machap, Puteri Wangsa and Bukit Permai. MUDA also clarified that the seat negotiations with PKR are still ongoing to "achieve unity in facing this election" The three parties also said they would combine their election machinery to support all of their candidates as they were about to move on as election strategic partners although MUDA is not part of PH and this is in line with the "big camp" principle to unite all Opposition parties to take on the ruling BN coalition. They also promised to form the Johor state government together if they win in the election. Johor PKR Chairman Syed Ibrahim Syed Noh said PKR had offered 3 seats to MUDA and was awaiting a response to the offer.

On 13 March 2022, MUDA won one seat in the first election it contested. MUDA Secretary General Amira Aisya won the Puteri Wangsa seat. President of MUDA Syed Saddiq Syed Abdul Rahman described the victory in the seat out of the seven seats contested as the party's first step to continue to gain a foothold in the country's political landscape.

=== 2023 state elections ===
On 26 June 2023, MUDA announced that they would contest as an independent party in the 2023 Malaysian state elections separately from the existing coalition government after Pakatan Harapan allegedly rejected efforts to engage in discussions. The party's decision to contest independently has faced criticism for potentially splitting PH votes. On 15 July, Syed Saddiq announced that MUDA has formed an electoral pact with Parti Sosialis Malaysia (PSM) for the state elections to be the "third choice" for voters "who are unhappy and bored with the politicians now and want to protest." MUDA will be fielding 20 candidates (10 men & 10 women) for the state elections. Syed Saddiq announced that MUDA will be in the opposition bloc in the state legislative assembly should the PH-BN alliance win the Penang state election.

MUDA and PSM failed to win a single seat contested with all candidates losing their election deposits. MUDA was lambasted by PH supporters for the party's supposed role in vote splitting where PH lost the Sungai Kandis seat that MUDA contested to PN by a very small margin. On 9 November 2023, Syed Saddiq was found guilty of all the corruption charges by the High Court for criminal breach of trust and misappropriation of funds belonging to his former party, BERSATU, sentencing him to 7 years' imprisonment, a RM 10 million fine and two strokes of the cane. As a result, he stepped down as president and Amira was appointed as acting president.

As of 2024, MUDA holds one seat in the Dewan Rakyat and one seat in the Johor State Legislative Assembly. The party has faced challenges in recent elections, failing to win any seats in the 2023 Malaysian state elections. Following the conviction of its founder, Syed Saddiq Syed Abdul Rahman, on corruption charges in November 2023, Amira Aisya Abdul Aziz was appointed as acting president. MUDA continues to position itself as a progressive, youth-oriented party, though its influence remains limited.

=== Kontrak MUDA Johor 2026 ===
Kontrak MUDA Johor 2026 (English: MUDA Johor Contract 2026) was the election manifesto of the Malaysian United Democratic Alliance (MUDA) for the 2026 Johor state election. The manifesto contained 15 pledges in three policy areas: the economy, housing and cost of living; political and governance reform; and the environment, water security and climate resilience.

== List of leaders ==
No.	Portrait	President	Term start	Term end	Elections
1		Syed Saddiq Syed Abdul Rahman	17 September 2020	9 November 2023	–
Acting		Amira Aisya Abdul Aziz	9 November 2023	14 March 2026	–
2		Amira Aisya Abdul Aziz	14 March 2026	Incumbent	2026

== Leadership structure ==
- President:
  - Amira Aisya Abdul Aziz
- Deputy President:
  - Zaidel Baharuddin
- Vice Presidents:
  - Leben Siddarth
  - Faezrah Rizalman
  - Dobby Chew
  - Zarul Afiq
  - Dr. Siva Prakash
- Secretary-General:
  - Ainie Haziqah
- Treasurer-General:
  - VKK Raja
- Information Chief:
  - Rasid Abu Bakar
- Central Executive Committee members:
  - Sayyida Izzati Nur
  - Shah Fariq Aizal bin Sha Ghazni
  - Andre Teow
  - Geethananthini
  - Rahmat Amran
  - Rashifa Aljunied
  - Kathirvelloo
  - Danial Abdul Majeed
  - Hasya 'Aqilah
  - Muhammad Amir Fiqri
  - Adom Teh
  - Siranjeev Ram A/L S Sanjeeviramah
  - Muhammad Yusri Aidid bin Malik
  - Daniel Lim
  - Nurazam bin Aziz

== Elected representatives ==
=== Members of Parliament of the 15th Malaysian Parliament ===
MUDA currently has a single MP in the Dewan Rakyat.

State	No.	Parliament Constituency	Member	Party
Johor	P146	Muar	Syed Saddiq Syed Abdul Rahman	MUDA
Total	Johor (1)			

=== Dewan Undangan Negeri (State Legislative Assembly) ===
The party currently has no representative in any Malaysia State Assembly.

==== Previous Members of State Legislative Assembly ====
15th Johor State Legislative Assembly

- Amira Aisya Abdul Aziz (Puteri Wangsa, 2022–2026)

== General election results ==
Election	Total seats won	Seats contested	Total votes	Voting Percentage	Outcome of election	Election leader
2022	1 / 222	6	74,392	0.48%	▲1 seat; Governing coalition (allied with Pakatan Harapan) (2022–2023); Opposition (2023–2026); Confidence and supply (since 2026)	Syed Saddiq

== State election results ==
State assembly	Election	Votes	%	Seats	Won/contested	+/–	Position (Note: As part of electoral coalition.)	Status
Perlis	2022	Did not contest						No seats
Kedah	2023	Did not contest						No seats
Kelantan	2023	Did not contest						No seats
Terengganu	2023	372	0.1	0 / 32	0 / 1	Steady	4th	No seats
Penang	2023	1,528	0.2	0 / 40	0 / 3	Steady	5th	No seats
Perak	2022	Did not contest						No seats
Pahang	2022	Did not contest						No seats
Selangor	2023	27,752	1.0	0 / 56	0 / 14	Steady	4th	No seats
Negeri Sembilan	2026	Did not contest						No seats
Malacca	2026	Did not contest						No seats
Johor	2026	10,236	0.5	0 / 56	0 / 4	▼1	▼5th (Blok Progresif)	No seats
Sabah	2025	Did not contest						No seats
Sarawak	2021	Did not contest						No seats

Note

State election	State Legislative Assembly													
State election	Perlis	Kedah	Kelantan	Terengganu	Penang	Perak	Pahang	Selangor	Negeri Sembilan	Malacca	Johor	Sabah	Sarawak	Total won / Total contested
2/3 majority	2 / 3	2 / 3	2 / 3	2 / 3	2 / 3	2 / 3	2 / 3	2 / 3	2 / 3	2 / 3	2 / 3	2 / 3	2 / 3	
2022											1 / 56			1 / 7
2023		0 / 36	0 / 45	0 / 32	0 / 40			0 / 56	0 / 36					0 / 19
2026											0 / 56			0 / 4

== See also ==
- Politics of Malaysia
- List of political parties in Malaysia
- 2023 Malaysian state elections
