= Syed Saddiq =

Malaysian politician (born 1992)

Yang Berhormat Tuan Syed Saddiq Syed Abdul Rahman MP
- سيد صادق سيد عبدالرحمن
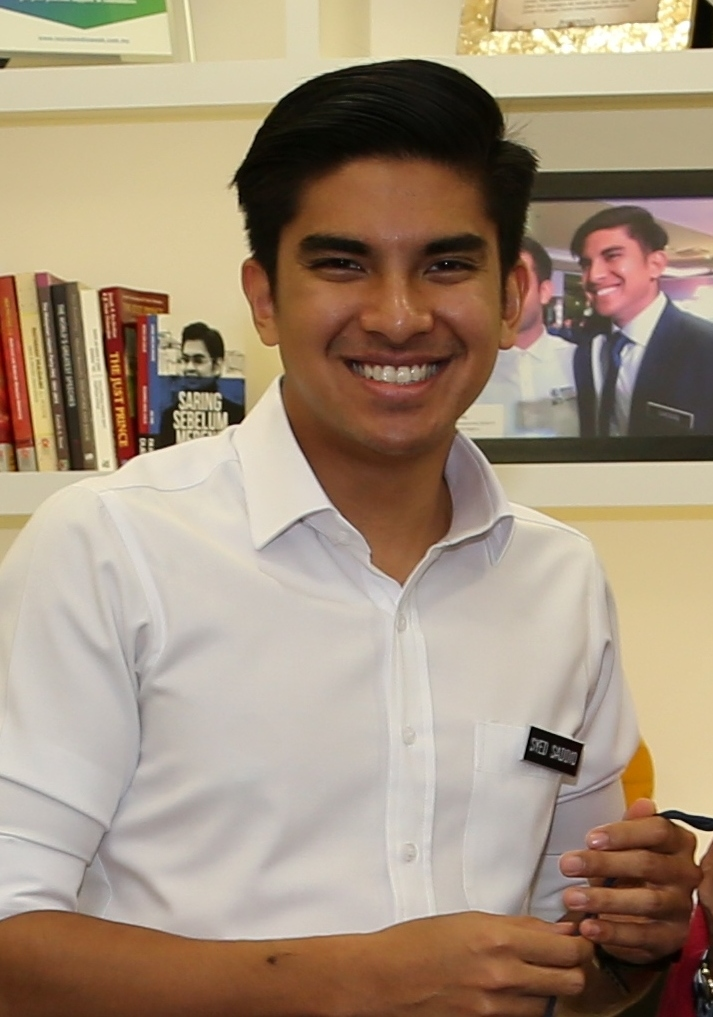
- Saddiq in 2019

Minister of Youth and Sports
- In office 2 July 2018 – 24 February 2020
- Prime Minister: Mahathir Mohamad
- Deputy: Steven Sim Chee Keong
- Preceded by: Khairy Jamaluddin
- Succeeded by: Reezal Merican Naina Merican
- Constituency: Muar

1st President of the Malaysian United Democratic Alliance
- In office 17 September 2020 – 9 November 2023
- Deputy: Amira Aisya Abdul Aziz
- Preceded by: Position established
- Succeeded by: Amira Aisya Abdul Aziz (Acting)

1st Youth Chief of the Malaysian United Indigenous Party
- In office 7 September 2016 – 28 May 2020
- President: Muhyiddin Yassin
- Deputy: Mohd Aizat Roslan
- Preceded by: Position established
- Succeeded by: Wan Ahmad Fayhsal Wan Ahmad Kamal

Member of the Malaysian Parliament for Muar
- Incumbent
- Assumed office 9 May 2018
- Preceded by: Razali Ibrahim (BN–UMNO)
- Majority: 6,953 (2018); 1,345 (2022)

Personal details
- Born: Syed Saddiq bin Syed Abdul Rahman; 6 December 1992 (age 33) Pulai, Johor, Malaysia
- Party: BERSATU (2016–2020); Independent (2020); MUDA (2020–present)
- Other political affiliations: Pakatan Harapan (2017–2020)
- Spouse: Dayang Nabellah Awang Astillah (m. 2026)
- Education: Royal Military College; International Islamic University Malaysia (LLB)
- Occupation: Politician
- Website: Syed Saddiq on Parliament of Malaysia

Syed Saddiq bin Syed Abdul Rahman (Jawi: سيد صادق بن سيد عبدالرحمن; Malay: [sa.(j)ed sa.dik̚]; born 6 December 1992) is a Malaysian politician who has served as the Member of Parliament (MP) for Muar since May 2018. A founder and member of Malaysian United Democratic Alliance, he is the youngest federal minister in the country serving as the Minister of Youth and Sports in the Pakatan Harapan (PH) administration from July 2018 until the collapse of the administration in February 2020.

Born in Johor, Saddiq is a founding member of the Malaysian United Democratic Alliance (MUDA) and served as its first president from September 2020 until November 2023. He was also a founding member of the Malaysian United Indigenous Party (BERSATU), a former component party of the PH coalition and served as first youth chief of BERSATU from the founding in September 2016 to his removal from the party in May 2020. Although he is presently the sole MUDA MP, his conviction and sentencing to imprisonment exceeds 1 year, which means he is liable for automatic disqualification as an MP for Muar.

In 2021, Saddiq was charged with several counts of corruption, including criminal breach of trust, misappropriation of funds, and money laundering. On 28 October 2022, he was ordered by the High Court to enter his defence after the prosecution showed that there was enough evidence against him to prove that he probably committed the crime. In 2023, he was found guilty of criminal breach of trust and money laundering. On 9 November the same year, Saddiq was convicted by the High Court of all the corruption charges, sentenced to 7 years' imprisonment, a RM 10 million fine and two strokes of the cane. He immediately resigned as the MUDA president following his conviction and was replaced by his deputy, Amira Aisya Abdul Aziz as the acting president. Prior to the conviction, Saddiq withdrew his support for Prime Minister Anwar Ibrahim and his government after Deputy Prime Minister Ahmad Zahid Hamidi had been granted discharge not amounting to acquittal (DNAA) for his court charges.

After his left MUDA in 2023, Saddiq became an opposition MP, and actively criticised, protested and campaigned against the unequal government financial allocations to the MPs across the political divide, with the opposition MPs being denied the allocations despite him having personally met with the government representative Deputy Prime Minister Fadillah Yusof for negotiations of giving allocations to opposition MPs for a few times, while supporting and advocating for reforming the pension scheme for cabinet ministers, MPs and the legislative assembly members.

== Early life and education ==
Saddiq was born in Pulai, Johor Bahru, Johor, Malaysia. Both his parents are Malays of Arab descent. His father used to work as a construction worker in Singapore. His mother used to be an English teacher. The youngest of four siblings, he had studied at the Royal Military College (RMC) before continuing his studies at the International Islamic University Malaysia (IIUM) in Bachelor of Laws (LLB). During his time at IIUM, he competed in an Asian-level debate competition and successfully won the United Asian Debating Championship (UADC). He is widely known in the debating community after having won Asia's Best Speaker award at the Asian British Parliamentary (ABP) Debating Championship three times.

In 2017, Saddiq allegedly rejected a counter offer to pursue his studies at Oxford University, England to remain active in politics. A year later, after being elected as MP at the age of 25, he once again allegedly dismissed another scholarship offer, this time rejecting the Chevening Scholarship proposal to pursue a Master in Public Policy at Oxford University.

In April 2021, Saddiq successfully completed the Lee Kuan Yew Senior Fellowship in Public Service Programme at Lee Kuan Yew School of Public Policy, National University of Singapore.

== Political career (2015–present) ==
=== Early political career and formation of BERSATU (2015–2018) ===
In 2015, Saddiq served as Perdana Fellow (Malay: Felo Perdana) to Minister in the Prime Minister's Department, Nancy Shukri.

Saddiq as a law graduate came to prominence in 2016 when he joined 24 other youths, a group that called themselves Change Led by the Young Generation (Challenger), published a statement rejecting Najib Razak's leadership over the scandal of 1Malaysia Development Berhad (1MDB).

Saddiq was the leader of ARMADA (Malay: Angkatan Bersatu Anak Muda); the youth wing of BERSATU. He was a spokesperson for the party since its inception in September 2016 and was considered one of the founding members and sat on the party council.

=== 2018 general election, Minister of Youth and Sports and Undi18 effort (2018–2020) ===
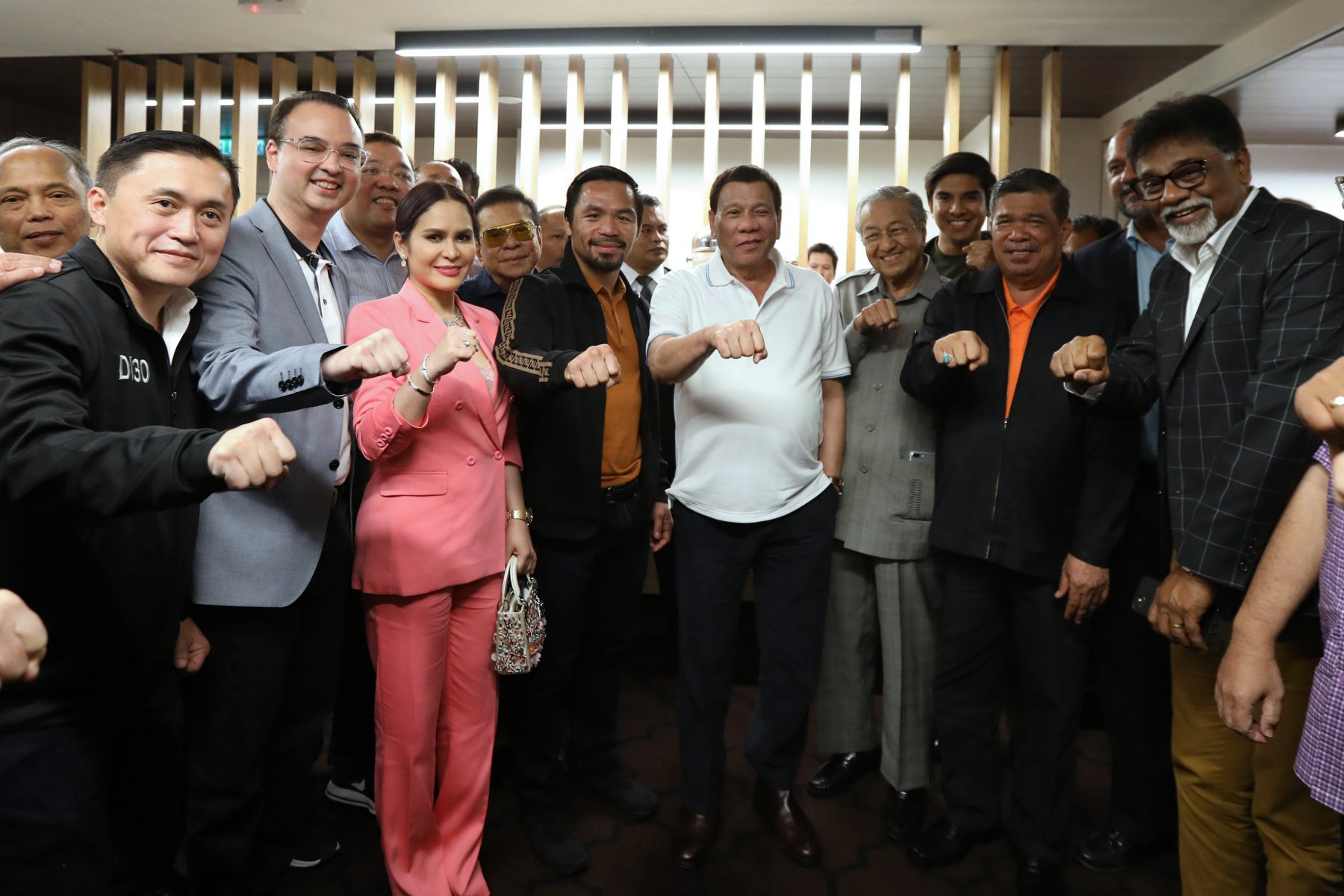
Syed Saddiq photographed with President Rodrigo Duterte, Senator Pacquiao and Prime Minister Mahathir Mohamad in 2018.

Saddiq made his debut contesting the 2018 general election (GE14) for the Muar parliamentary seat and was elected to the Parliament. He was then appointed as the Minister of Youth and Sports under the PH government in 2018. At the age of 25, he was the youngest ever federal minister, as well as the third youngest MP (after the 2018-elected Prabakaran Parameswaran (21) and 1976-elected Najib Razak (22)) since Malaysia's independence. He was sometimes nicknamed 'cucu' (literally meaning 'grandson') for his youthfulness in the Parliament house.

As the Minister of Youth and Sports, Saddiq advocated for a lower voting age from 21 to 18 years old ahead of the 15th General Election (GE15), in an effort dubbed as the "Undi18". In July 2019, he tabled a Bill in Parliament to amend the Federal Constitution to lower the voting age to 18 but it was withdrawn and re-tabled later after it was tweaked to accommodate some changes. The Dewan Rakyat on 16 July unanimously passed the re-tabled Constitution (Amendment) Act 2019 bill to lower the voting age, as well as eligibility to contest in election to 18 and automatic registration of voters by Election Commission (EC). In November 2021, the constitutional amendment was finally gazetted which stated that Undi18 amendments would come into effect for implementation on 15 December as consented by Yang di-Pertuan Agong.

=== Expulsion from BERSATU and formation of MUDA (2020–present) ===
Saddiq became an Independent in May 2020 after being expelled as a member and Youth Chief of the Malaysian United Indigenous Party (BERSATU), amid internal divisions following the Sheraton Move, which led to the collapse of the Pakatan Harapan (PH) government.

In the aftermath of the political crisis, factions within BERSATU split, with former prime minister Mahathir Mohamad and several aligned MPs later forming the Homeland Fighters Party (PEJUANG). However, instead of joining PEJUANG, Saddiq announced on 21 August that he would establish a new multiracial, youth-centric party.

On 17 September 2020, he launched and co-founded the Malaysian United Democratic Alliance (MUDA), which was officially registered as a political party on 23 December 2021.

In the 2023 state elections, he positioned MUDA in opposition to the Madani government by contesting against Pakatan Harapan incumbents, but the party lost all the seats it contested.

== Corruption charges ==
In July 2021, Saddiq was charged with criminal breach of trust and misappropriation of funds belonging to his former party, BERSATU. For the first charge, he, then the party’s Youth Chief, was accused of criminal breach of trust for withdrawing RM1.12 million via cheque without approval from BERSATU’s Supreme Council. He also faced a separate charge of misappropriating RM120,000 in party donations intended for the 2018 general election. He pleaded not guilty to both charges and was released on bail of RM330,000 with additional conditions, claiming that the charges were politically motivated, alleging that they were brought against him because he refused to support the Perikatan Nasional administration.

In August 2021, Saddiq was charged again with two corruption charges of money laundering. According to the charge sheet, the accused transferred RM50,000 from his bank account to his Amanah Saham Bumiputera account on 16 June 2018 and another RM50,000 on 19 June 2018. He pleaded not guilty to the charges. He claimed that Wan Ahmad Fayhsal, the BERSATU youth chief, came to his house before he was accused and persuaded him to rejoin BERSATU and support Muhyiddin Yassin as prime minister. Although Wan Fayhsal admitted that there was a meeting with Saddiq, he insisted that the meeting was not to make an offer or threat to him.

On 5 July 2022, a key witness in Saddiq's trial, Rafiq Hakim Razali, said that Saddiq asked him to dispose of part of the RM1 million Bersatu funds. The RM1 million was in Saddiq's possession.

On 18 July 2022, the High Court rejected Saddiq's bid to impeach Rafiq due to his 'contradicting statements' in his ongoing criminal breach of trust trial. This means that Rafiq can still testify against Saddiq in the trial.

On 19 July 2022, a Malaysian Anti-Corruption Commission (MACC) officer, Khairi, claimed that the MACC was investigating Saddiq for making false statements about RM250,000 that went missing. They went to his house to try to find out more information, and during the investigation, they seized a phone belonging to Rafiq. Gobind Singh Deo, Saddiq's lawyer, cross-examined Khairi and said that the act of going to Saddiq's house was an abuse of power by MACC. Khairi denied that MACC had abused its powers, saying the investigation was launched based on information received.

On 28 October 2022, the High Court found that the prosecution had succeeded in proving a prima facie case against Saddiq, and he was ordered to enter his defense on four charges of misappropriation of assets, money laundering and abetting in criminal breach of trust. On 9 November 2023, he was found guilty of all the corruption charges by the High Court, sentencing him to 7 years' imprisonment, a RM 10 million fine and two strokes of the cane. He was granted a stay of execution of his sentence while pending his appeal.

On 12 December 2024, Saddiq filed his petition through his lawyers, listing 18 reasons why he should be freed from the graft case. In his petition of appeal, he said the trial judge, who convicted him for the offences earlier, erred in law and breached Section 182A of the Criminal Procedure Code because the judge did not consider all the evidence required by the law.

On 25 June 2025, a three judge panel of the Court of Appeal acquitted and discharged Saddiq's conviction and sentence, thereby freeing him. In the court case, the defence's argument that one of the witnesses, Rafiq tailored his evidence to appease the MACC, was found to have merit in the contention that witnesses were pressured, suggesting MACC might have exerted pressure.

The following day, 26 June 2025, the Attorney General's Chambers filed an appeal against his acquittal and Saddiq faced court on 11 December 2025 in defence of his acquittal.

On Monday 13 July 2026, the Federal Court in Putrajaya upheld his 2025 acquittal and reaffirmed his innocence thereby drawing a final conclusion to the corruption controversy.

== Political views ==
=== Israeli-Palestinian conflict ===
Saddiq has been vocal in his support for Palestine and criticism of Israel. He has stated that Palestine existed long before Israel, and criticised Israel for illegally appointing themselves as the "guardians" of Palestine. He also stands firm with Malaysia's ban on Israeli athletes, and has called for the freedom of Palestine.

=== LGBT rights ===
In July 2018, Saddiq faced criticism after his personal aide, Numan Afifi, resigned due to his involvement in LGBT activism. In response, Saddiq tweeted, "You'll always be a bro," indicating his support for Numan.

During a forum on 1 September 2020, when Saddiq was asked whether the MUDA party would accept LGBT members, he stated:

We should never forget Malaysia's DNA, which is the Federal Constitution and the National Principles (Rukun Negara) that must be the pillar or umbrella of a party. Therefore, if we can, we need to institutionalise the National Principles. Before every program, [we] stand up, read the National Principles, embed them in [our] heart. And don't forget, whatever the policies that are to be formulated, whatever the level of openness, we must not ignore the Federal Constitution and the National Principles. As long as we hold firm to these two things, I am confident, insya'Allah, we will succeed.

— Syed Saddiq

== Controversies and issues ==
=== Outspoken comments ===
Saddiq is an avid social media user and regularly posts about political and social issues in Malaysia. In September 2015, he said he would "teach" Nurul Hidayah, the daughter of ex-Deputy Prime Minister Ahmad Zahid Hamidi, who criticized participants in the Bersih 4.0 demonstration. In November 2015, he admitted that he had supported Najib Razak, but later said Najib had embarrassed the country because of the 1Malaysia Development Berhad scandal. In October 2018, he said that Ketuanan Melayu had ended by calling the term nothing more than a mere meaningless phrase. His statement then evoked various responses from many parties. He defended the actions of four academics who allegedly submitted an executive summary on the Rome Statute of the International Criminal Court (ICC) to the Conference of Rulers and insisted their actions were part of the academic freedom promised by Pakatan Harapan (PH) in celebrating democracy and differences of opinion in Malaysia.

=== Relationship with Tunku Ismail Idris ===
In 2019, Saddiq denied being in an "open warfare" with the Crown Prince of Johor, Tunku Ismail Idris. He responded on his Twitter to the Crown Prince that there were some parties that had considered it a “declaration of war”.

=== Probed for video on police brutality ===
In May 2021, Saddiq was investigated by the Malaysian police for a video he posted on TikTok. In this video, he demanded justice for the late A. Ganapathy who recently died in police custody. He started the video with the hashtag #justiceforganapathy and went on to describe the serious injuries inflicted on Ganapathy that ultimately led to his death. He continued by saying "police brutality is a serious issue" and listed the names of the men that have died in police custody from the year 2009 to 2021. He then ended the video by encouraging viewers to "push for the IPCMC bill (to establish the Independent Police Complaints & Misconduct Commission) and to push for justice".

On 22 May 2021, the police brought Saddiq into the Dang Wangi District Police Headquarters, seized his phone and took control of his Instagram and TikTok accounts after being instructed to do so by the Malaysian Communications and Multimedia Commission (MCMC). According to Datuk Mohd Azman Ahmad Sapri, the deputy director of the Bukit Aman Criminal Investigation Department, he was being investigated under Section 505(b) of the Penal Code and Section 233 of the Communications and Multimedia Act.

However, MCMC has denied instructing the Royal Malaysia Police (RMP) to seize Saddiq's phone, they merely "acted as a technical agency in assisting police investigation". Despite claims from Saddiq that this was a "politically motivated move orchestrated by MCMC", the MCMC stated that they will continue to "provide assistance and technical recommendations for the investigation without any hidden agenda including political agenda".

== Personal life ==
Saddiq currently lives in Kampung Tunku, Selangor, Malaysia, where he also used the residence as his office and runs the day-to-day administration of the Malaysian United Democratic Alliance (MUDA). He enjoys cycling and joining marathons.

In 2024, Saddiq and singer-actress Bella Astillah developed a close relationship after collaborating on a modelling initiative aimed at raising funds for his constituent, following his unsuccessful attempts to secure government allocations. Through this effort, he raised RM1 million in donations for Muar. Saddiq and Bella's relationship was widely speculated by Malaysian netizens to be romantic over the years. Saddiq also made a cameo appearance in Bella's music video, "Tapi Bukan Denganmu". The couple became engaged on 28 March 2026 after Syed Saddiq posted on his Instagram earlier on the same day announcing their engagement would be livestreamed by Astro that afternoon.

On 10 October 2026, Syed Saddiq married Bella Astillah in an Islamic solemnisation ceremony held on the 118th floor of Merdeka 118 in Kuala Lumpur. The marriage was solemnised at 10:40 a.m. by former Federal Territories Mufti Zulkifli Mohamad Al-Bakri, with the marriage contract concluded after a single pronouncement. Bella received a mahr of RM500, along with seven trays of wedding gifts, which were reciprocated with nine trays from her family.

== Election results ==
Parliament of Malaysia
Year	Constituency	Candidate	Votes	Pct	Opposition(s)	Votes	Pct	Ballots cast	Majority	Turnout
2018	P146 Muar	Syed Saddiq Syed Abdul Rahman (BERSATU)	22,341	53.09%	Razali Ibrahim (UMNO)	15,388	36.57%	42,719	6,953	84.02%
2018	P146 Muar	Syed Saddiq Syed Abdul Rahman (BERSATU)	22,341	53.09%	Abdul Aziz Talib (PAS)	4,354	10.34%	42,719	6,953	84.02%
2022	P146 Muar	Syed Saddiq Syed Abdul Rahman (MUDA)	19,961	37.55%	Abdullah Husin (PAS)	18,616	35.02%	53,158	1,345	77.12%
2022	P146 Muar	Syed Saddiq Syed Abdul Rahman (MUDA)	19,961	37.55%	Mohd Helmy Abd Latiff (UMNO)	14,581	27.43%	53,158	1,345	77.12%

== Honours and award ==
=== Honours of Malaysia ===
- Malaysia
  - Recipient of the 16th Yang di-Pertuan Agong Installation Medal (2019)
  - Recipient of the 17th Yang di-Pertuan Agong Installation Medal (2024)

=== Award ===
- NONA Man Inspiring Award of the Nona Superhero Award (2021)

Political offices
Preceded by Khairy Jamaluddin	Minister of Youth and Sports (Malaysia); 2 July 2018–24 February 2020	Succeeded by Reezal Merican Naina Merican
Parliament of Malaysia
Preceded by Razali Ibrahim	Member of Parliament for Muar; 9 May 2018–present	Incumbent
Party political offices
New title	President of Malaysian United Democratic Alliance; 17 September 2020–9 November 2023	Succeeded by Amira Aisya Abdul Aziz (Acting)
New title	Youth Chief of Malaysian United Indigenous Party; 7 September 2016–28 May 2020	Succeeded by Wan Ahmad Fayhsal Wan Ahmad Kamal
