= Dewan Rakyat =

Lower house of the Parliament of Malaysia

House of Representatives Dewan Rakyat ديوان رعية
- 15th Parliament

Type
- Type: Lower house of the Parliament of Malaysia

Leadership
- Speaker: Johari Abdul, PH–PKR since 19 December 2022
- Deputy Speaker I: Ramli Mohd Nor, BN–UMNO since 19 December 2022
- Deputy Speaker II: Alice Lau, PH–DAP since 19 December 2022
- Secretary: Nizam Mydin Bacha Mydin since 13 May 2020
- Prime Minister: Anwar Ibrahim, PH–PKR since 24 November 2022
- Deputy Prime Minister I: Ahmad Zahid Hamidi, BN–UMNO since 3 December 2022
- Deputy Prime Minister II: Fadillah Yusof, GPS–PBB since 3 December 2022
- Leader of the Opposition: Hamzah Zainuddin, PN–WAWASAN since 13 June 2026

Structure
- Seats: 222
- Political groups: As of 29 October 2026 Government (143) PH (75): DAP (40); PKR (27); AMANAH (8); BN (30): UMNO (26); MCA (2); MIC (1); PBRS (1); GPS (23): PBB (14); PRS (5); PDP (2); SUPP (2); GRS (7): Direct member (4); UPKO (2); PBS (1); WARISAN (3) KDM (2) STAR (1) PBM (1) Independent (1) Confidence and supply (13) BERSATU (6) Independent (6) MUDA (1) Opposition (62) PN (62): PAS (43); BERSATU (13); WAWASAN (6); Vacant (4)
- Committees: 5: Committee of Selection; Public Accounts Committee; House Committee; Committee of Privileges; Standing Orders Committee
- Length of term: Up to 5 years
- Salary: RM25,700 per month (including allowances)

Elections
- Voting system: First-past-the-post
- First election: 19 August 1959
- Last election: 19 November 2022
- Next election: By 17 February 2028

Meeting place
- Dewan Rakyat chamber Malaysian Houses of Parliament, Kuala Lumpur, Malaysia

Website
- Official website

The Dewan Rakyat (Dewan Ra'ayat before 1972; English: House of Representatives, lit. 'People's Hall'; Jawi: ديوان رعية) is the lower house of the bicameral Parliament of Malaysia. The chamber and its powers are established by Article 44 of the Constitution of Malaysia. The Dewan Rakyat sits in the Houses of Parliament in Kuala Lumpur, along with the upper Dewan Negara.

The Dewan Rakyat is a directly elected body consisting of 222 members known as Members of Parliament (MPs). Members are elected by first-past-the-post voting with one member from each federal constituency. Members hold their seats until the Dewan Rakyat is dissolved, the term of which is constitutionally limited to five years after an election. The number of seats each state or territory is entitled to is fixed by Article 46 of the Constitution.

While the concurrence of both chambers of Parliament is normally necessary for legislation to be enacted, the Dewan Rakyat holds significantly more power in practice; the Dewan Negara very rarely rejects bills that have been passed by the Dewan Rakyat and the Dewan Rakyat can bypass the Dewan Negara if it refuses to pass a specific law twice, with at least one year in between. The Cabinet is solely responsible to the Dewan Rakyat, and the prime minister only has to maintain the support of the lower house.

== History ==
The history of the Dewan Rakyat can be traced back to the Federal Legislative Council. At that time, 52 out of the 100-member council were elected directly by the people using the first-past-the-post system, returning one representatives from each constituencies. The council was dissolved in 1959, a year ahead of its expiration term, to pave the way for a new election for the new Dewan Rakyat, which was to be the lower house of the Parliament of Malaya.

The voting system was retained from the previous election, and has since taken place in the subsequent elections post-independence. The number of seats increased to 104, abolishing the nominated seats in favour of elected members. The ruling Alliance returned as the Government with a majority of 44 seats. Tunku Abdul Rahman reelected as the Prime Minister, while the new Parliament convened on 2 September 1959.

After the formation of Malaysia, a special autonomy status allowing representatives from Sabah, Sarawak and Singapore to be elected indirectly by the state assemblies. Therefore, in 1964 elections, only 65% of the total seats were contested. The Alliance retained its position with a higher margin.

The 1969 elections marked the first time Alliance failed to win a supermajority and majority popular vote. The racial unrest that occurred in the aftermath resulted in Parliament being suspended until 1971. Upon the reopening of the Parliament, the Alliance returned with a supermajority government after Bornean local parties, PAS and GERAKAN joined the coalition, later to be known as Barisan Nasional.

== Membership ==
Members are referred to as "Member of Parliament" ("MPs") or "Ahli Dewan Rakyat" (lit. 'member of the Dewan Rakyat') in Malay. The term of office is as long as the member wins in the elections.

A member of the Dewan Rakyat must be at least 18 years of age, which was lowered from 21 when the Dewan Rakyat passed the Bill to amend Article 47 of the Federal Constitution in 2019, and must not concurrently be a member of the Dewan Negara. The presiding officer of the Dewan Rakyat is the Speaker, who is elected at the beginning of each Parliament or after the vacation of the post, by the MPs. Two Deputy Speakers are also elected, and one of them sits in place of the Speaker when he is absent. The Dewan Rakyat machinery is supervised by the Clerk of the House who is appointed by the King; he may only be removed from office through the manner prescribed for judges or by mandatory retirement at age 60.

As of the 2018 general election, the Dewan Rakyat has 222 elected members. Members are elected from federal constituencies drawn by the Election Commission. Constituency boundaries are redrawn every ten years based on the latest census.

Each Dewan Rakyat lasts for a maximum of five years, after which a general election must be called. In the general election, voters select a candidate to represent their constituency in the Dewan Rakyat. The first-past-the-post voting system is used; the candidate who gains the most votes wins the seat.

Before a general election can be called, the King must first dissolve Parliament on the advice of the Prime Minister. According to the Constitution, the Yang di-Pertuan Agong has the right at his own discretion to either grant or withhold consent to dissolve the parliament.

== Powers and procedure ==
Parliament is the legislative branch of the federal government and is responsible for passing, amending and repealing primary legislation. These are known as Acts of Parliament.

Members of Parliament possess parliamentary privilege and are permitted to speak on any subject without fear of censure outside Parliament; the only body that can censure an MP is the House Committee of Privileges. Immunity is effective from the moment a member of Parliament is sworn in, and only applies when that member has the floor; it does not apply to statements made outside the House. An exception is made by the Sedition Act passed by Parliament in the wake of the 13 May racial riots in 1969. Under the Act, all public discussion of repealing certain Articles of the Constitution dealing with Bumiputra privileges such as Article 153 is illegal. This prohibition is extended to all members of both houses of Parliament. Members of Parliament are also forbidden from criticising the King and judges.

The executive government, comprising the Prime Minister and his Cabinet, is usually drawn from members of Parliament; most of its members are typically members of the Dewan Rakyat. After a general election or the resignation or death of a Prime Minister, the King selects the Prime Minister, who is the head of government but constitutionally subordinate to him, from the Dewan Rakyat. In practice, this is usually the leader of the largest party in Parliament. The Prime Minister then submits a list containing the names of members of his Cabinet, who will then be appointed as Ministers by the King. Members of the Cabinet must also be members of Parliament. If the Prime Minister loses the confidence of the Dewan Rakyat, whether by losing a no-confidence vote or failing to pass a budget, he must either advise the King to dissolve Parliament and hold a general election or submit his resignation to the King. The King has the discretion to grant or withhold consent to the dissolution. If consent is withheld, the government must resign and the King would appoint a new Prime Minister that has the support of the majority of members of Parliament. The Cabinet formulates government policy and drafts bills, meeting in private. Its members must accept "collective responsibility" for the decisions the Cabinet makes, even if some members disagree with it; if they do not wish to be held responsible for Cabinet decisions, they must resign. Although the Constitution makes no provision for it, there is also a Deputy Prime Minister, who is the de facto successor of the Prime Minister should he die or be otherwise incapacitated.

A proposed act of law begins its life when a particular government minister or ministry prepares a first draft with the assistance of the Attorney-General's Department. The draft, known as a bill, is then discussed by the Cabinet. If it is agreed to submit it to Parliament, the bill is distributed to all MPs. It then goes through three readings before the Dewan Rakyat. The first reading is where the minister or his deputy submits it to Parliament. At the second reading, the bill is discussed and debated by MPs. At the third reading, the minister or his deputy formally submit it to a vote for approval. A simple majority is usually required to pass the bill, but in certain cases, such as amendments to the constitution, a two-thirds majority is required. Should the bill pass, it is sent to the Dewan Negara, where the three readings are carried out again. The Dewan Negara may choose not to pass the bill, but this only delays its passage by a month, or in some cases, a year; once this period expires, the bill is considered to have been passed by the house.

If the bill passes, it is presented to the Yang di-Pertuan Agong who has 30 days to consider the bill. Should he disagree with it, he returns it to Parliament with a list of suggested amendments. Parliament must then reconsider the bill and its proposed amendments and return it to the King within 30 days if they pass it again. The King then has another 30 days to give the royal assent; otherwise, it passes into law. The law does not take effect until it is published in the Government Gazette.

The government attempts to maintain top secrecy regarding bills debated; MPs generally receive copies of bills only a few days before they are debated, and newspapers are rarely provided with copies of the bills before they are debated. In some cases, such as a 1968 amendment to the Constitution, an MP may be presented with a bill to be debated on the same day it is tabled, and all three readings may be carried out that day itself. In rare circumstances, the government may release a White paper containing particular proposals that will eventually be incorporated into a bill; this has been done for legislation such as the Universities and University Colleges Act.

Although the process above assumes only the government can propose bills, there also exists a process for private member's bills. However, unlike most other legislatures following the Westminster system, few members of Parliament actually introduce bills. To present a private member's bill, the member in question must seek the leave of the House in question to debate the bill before it is moved. Originally, it was allowed to debate the bill in the process of seeking leave, but this process was discontinued by an amendment to the Standing Orders of the Dewan Rakyat. It is also possible for senators of the Dewan Negara to initiate bills; however, only cabinet ministers are permitted to move finance-related bills, which must be tabled in the Dewan Rakyat.

It is often alleged that legislation proposed by the opposition parties, which must naturally be in the form of a private member's bill, is not seriously considered by Parliament. Some have gone as far as to claim that the rights of members of Parliament to debate proposed bills have been severely curtailed by incidents such as an amendment of the Standing Orders that permitted the Speaker to amend written copies of MPs' speeches before they were made. Nevertheless, it is admitted by some of these critics that "government officials often face sharp questioning in Parliament, although this is not always reported in detail in the press."

=== Special Chamber ===
In 2016, Speaker Pandikar Amin Mulia introduced a Special Chamber of the Dewan Rakyat which holds proceedings separately from the main house, to "allow matters of national importance or urgency to be discussed without interrupting the normal proceedings of the Lower House." Government and opposition leaders both welcomed the move, with Minister in the Prime Minister's Department Azalina Othman Said, Democratic Action Party whip Anthony Loke, and People's Justice Party whip Johari Abdul issuing favourable statements to the press. Amendments to the Standing Orders of the Dewan Rakyat in April 2016 established the Special Chamber to host debates on "any matter of administration for which the government is responsible" or "a defined matter of urgent public importance".

Liew Chin Tong, at the time an opposition Member of Parliament, claimed he had lobbied Pandikar to institute the Special Chamber, which he has said takes inspiration from both the Australian and British parliaments. Liew has proposed expanding the remit of the Special Chamber: "A full-fledged second chamber should take away all constituency-specific issues off the main chamber and move them to the second chamber so that the main chamber focuses only on the most important things." When he and Pandikar spoke at a panel on parliamentary reform in 2021, Liew also proposed expanding the amount of time allotted for Special Chamber debates: "Currently, only two speeches of seven and a half minutes each by backbenchers or opposition MPs with replies from government of equal time are permitted, amounting to only 30 minutes each day."

In 2023, after being elected Speaker of the Dewan Rakyat, Johari announced that the Special Chamber would double the number of motions permitted per session from two to four. He also announced that opposition and government backbencher MPs would be allowed to preside over the Special Chamber, instead of limiting the chair to just the Speaker and Deputy Speakers.

== Current composition ==
Affiliation	Leader in Parliament	Status	Seats	
Affiliation	Leader in Parliament	Status	2022 election	Current
Pakatan Harapan	Anwar Ibrahim	Majority coalition government	81	75
Barisan Nasional	Ahmad Zahid Hamidi	Majority coalition government	30	30
Gabungan Parti Sarawak	Fadillah Yusof	Majority coalition government	23	23
Gabungan Rakyat Sabah	Armizan Mohd Ali	Majority coalition government	5	7
Heritage Party	Shafie Apdal	Majority coalition government	3	3
Social Democratic Harmony Party	Wetrom Bahanda	Majority coalition government	2	2
Homeland Solidarity Party	Jeffrey Kitingan	Majority coalition government	1	1
Parti Bangsa Malaysia	Larry Sng	Majority coalition government	1	1
Independent	Verdon Bahanda	Majority coalition government	1	1
Malaysian United Indigenous Party	Muhyiddin Yassin	Confidence and supply	31	6
Independent	No formal leader	Confidence and supply	0	6
Malaysian United Democratic Alliance	Syed Saddiq Syed Abdul Rahman	Confidence and supply	1	1
Malaysian Islamic Party	Abdul Hadi Awang	Opposition	43	43
Malaysian United Indigenous Party	No formal leader	Opposition	0	13
National Vision Party	Hamzah Zainudin	Opposition	0	6
Total			222	218

== Members per state and federal territory ==
State / federal territory	Number of seats	Population (2020 census)	Population per seat
F. T. Kuala Lumpur	11	1,982,112	180,192
F. T. Labuan	1	95,120	95,120
F. T. Putrajaya	1	109,202	109,202
Johor	26	4,009,670	154,218
Kedah	15	2,131,427	142,095
Kelantan	14	1,792,501	128,036
Malacca	6	998,428	166,405
Negeri Sembilan	8	1,199,974	149,997
Pahang	14	1,591,295	113,664
Penang	13	1,740,405	133,877
Perak	24	2,496,041	104,002
Perlis	3	284,885	94,962
Sabah	25	3,418,785	136,751
Sarawak	31	2,453,677	79,151
Selangor	22	6,994,423	317,928
Terengganu	8	1,149,440	143,680
