= Next Malaysian general election =

- On or before February 2028

All 222 seats in the Dewan Rakyat 112 seats needed for a majority
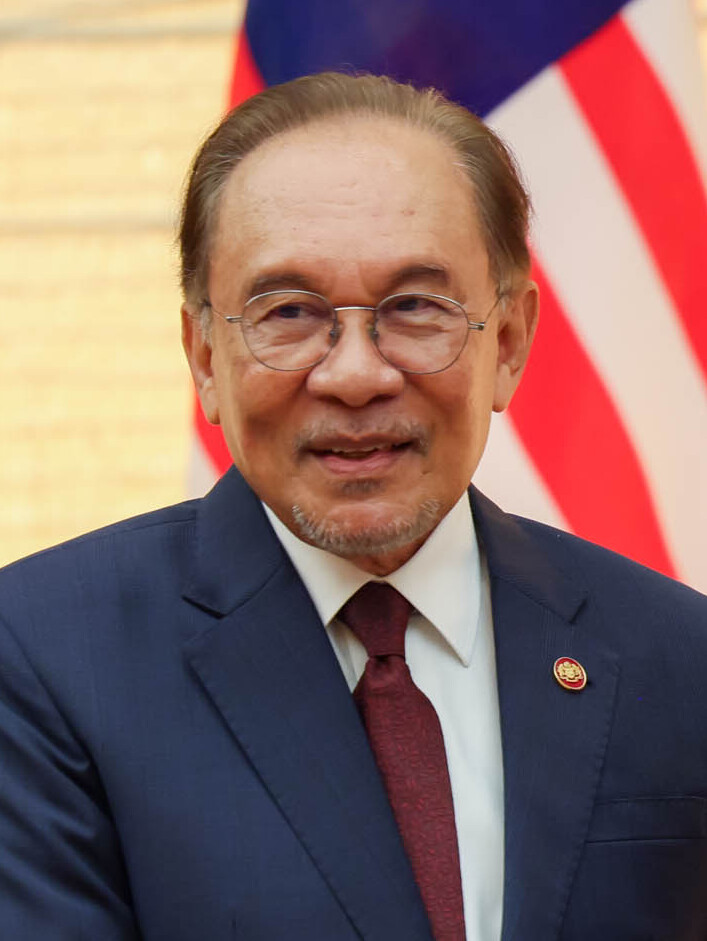

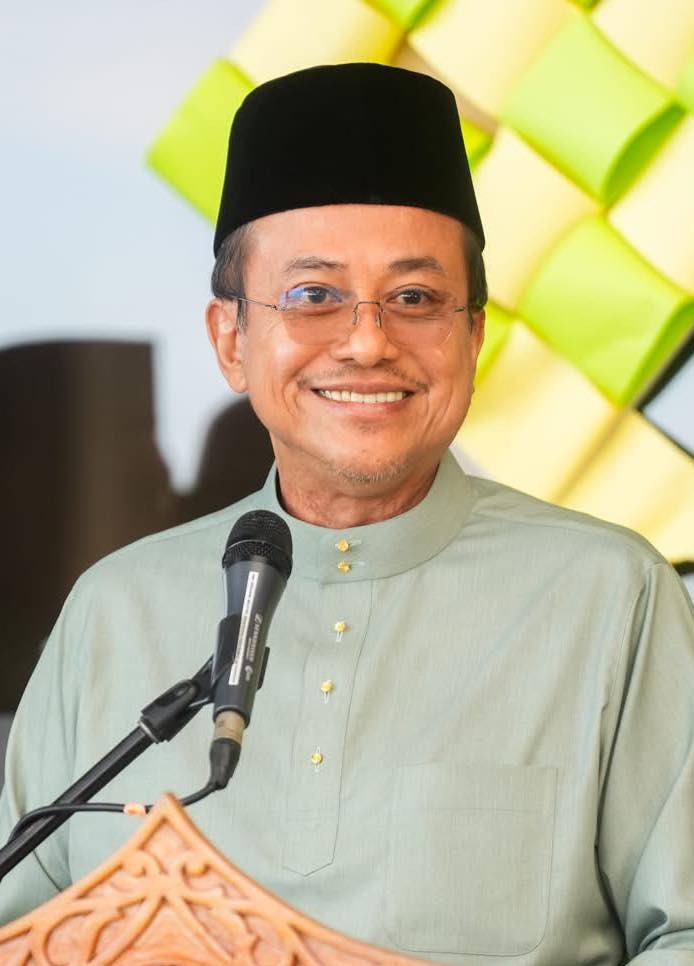

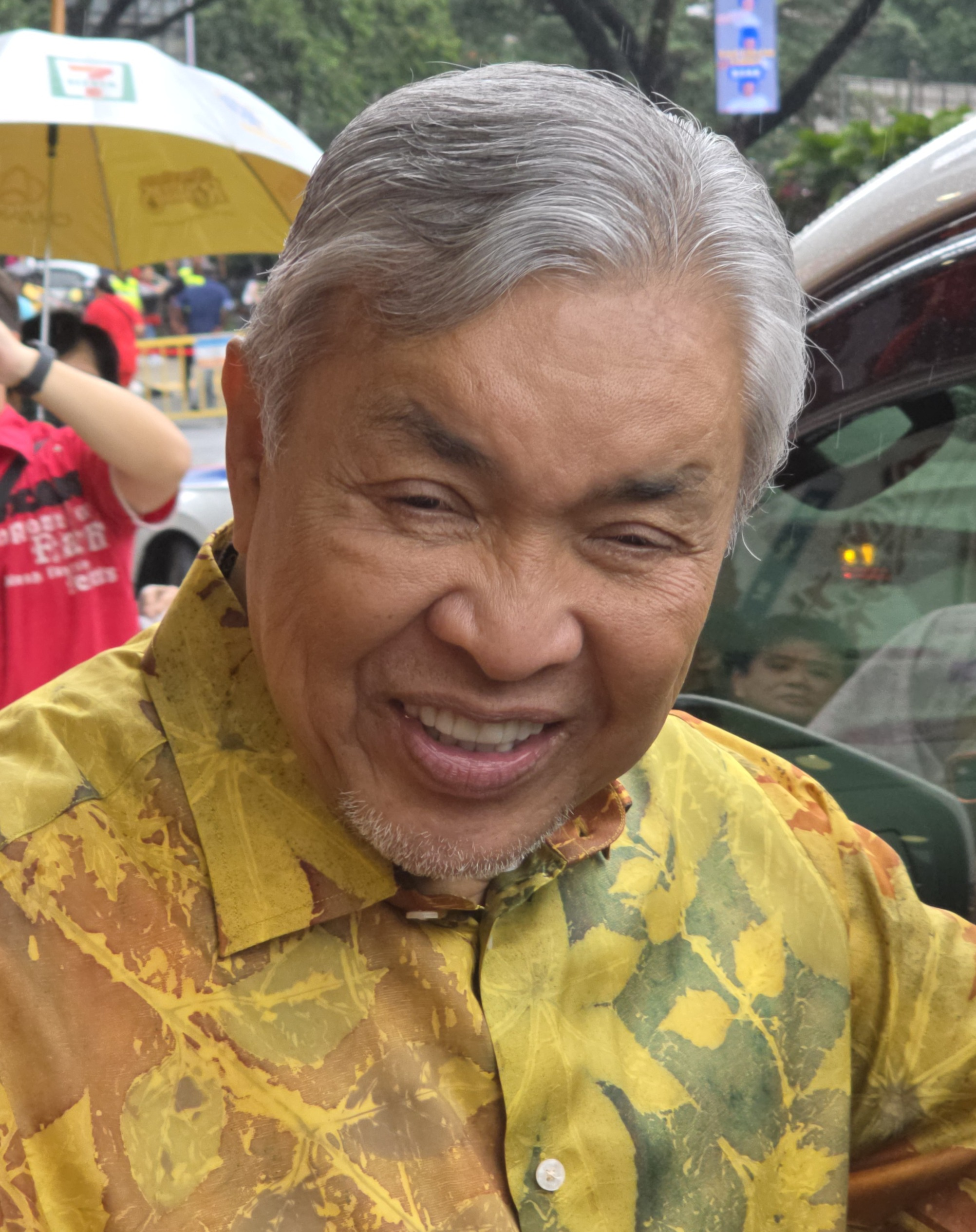

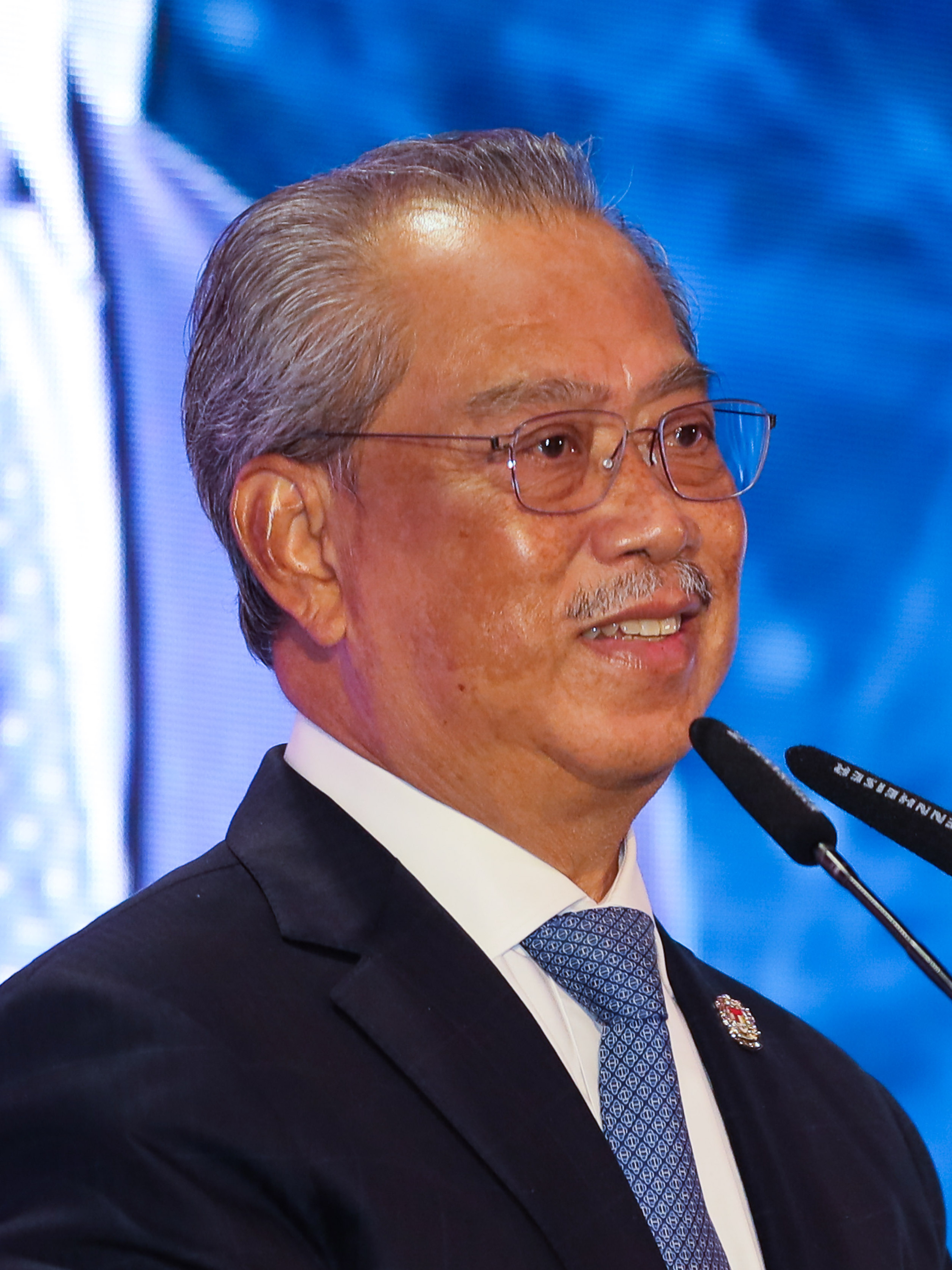

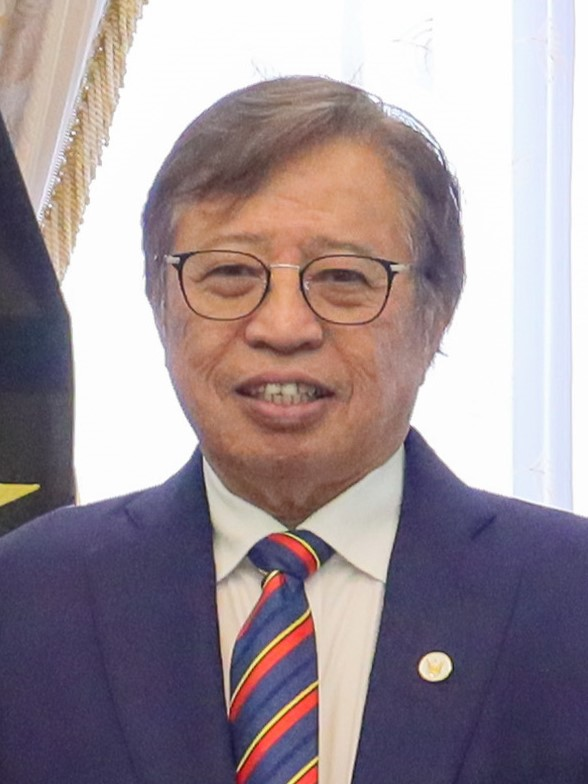

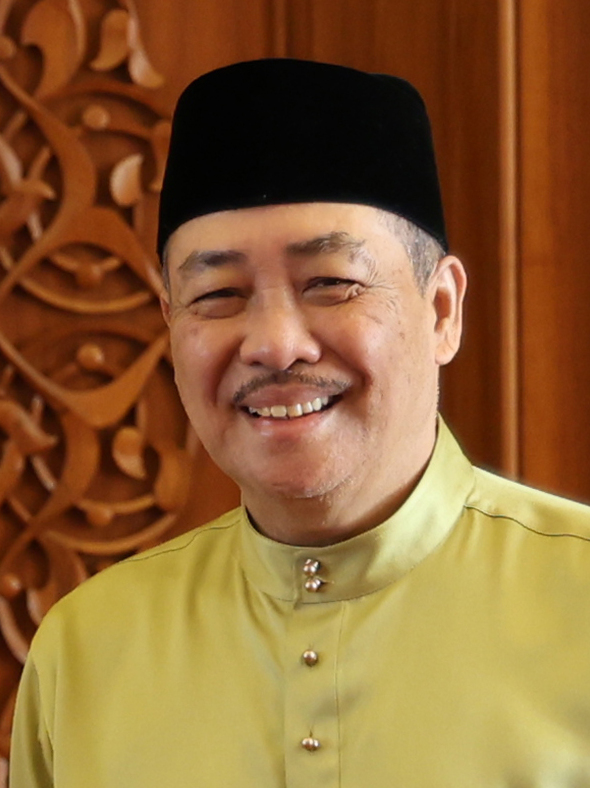
Leader	Anwar Ibrahim	Ahmad Samsuri Mokhtar	Ahmad Zahid Hamidi
Party	PKR	PAS	UMNO
Alliance	Pakatan Harapan	Perikatan Nasional	Barisan Nasional
Leader's seat	Tambun	Kemaman	Bagan Datuk
Last election	81 seats	74 seats	30 seats
Current seats	75	49	30
Seats needed	▲37	▲63	▲82
Leader	Muhyiddin Yassin	Abang Johari	Hajiji Noor
Party	BERSATU	PBB	GAGASAN
Alliance	Ikatan Prihatin Rakyat	Gabungan Parti Sarawak	Gabungan Rakyat Sabah
Leader's seat	Pagoh	N/A	N/A
Last election	35 seats	23 seats	6 seats
Current seats	19	23	7
Seats needed	▲93	(Note: GPS only contests seats in Sarawak, insufficient to form government in their own right)	(Note: GRS only contests seats in Sabah and Labuan, insufficient to form government in their own right)
Incumbent Prime Minister
Anwar Ibrahim
PH–PKR

The next general election in Malaysia is scheduled to be held on or before February 2028. It will determine the composition of the Dewan Rakyat, which determines the government of Malaysia. Redistribution and boundary changes for the constituencies are expected to take place by 2026, with the last taking place before the 2018 general election.

Prime Minister Anwar Ibrahim, leader of Pakatan Harapan (PH), currently leads a coalition government consisting of PH, BN, GPS, GRS, WARISAN and other minor parties. Perikatan Nasional (PN) and the Malaysian United Democratic Alliance (MUDA) sit as the opposition.

The 2022 general elections saw PN make gains primarily in the northern peninsular states of Perlis, Kedah, Kelantan, and Terengganu in what was dubbed as the Green Wave. It resulted in a hung parliament for the first time in Malaysian electoral history.

== Background ==
The party commanding a majority support in the Dewan Rakyat is called upon by the Yang di-Pertuan Agong to form a government and present its nominee as Prime Minister of Malaysia, whereas the largest party in the opposition bench nominates a candidate for Leader of the Opposition.

The incumbent ruling Pakatan Harapan (PH) coalition had previously won the 2018 election prior to collapsing in the aftermath of the 2020 political crisis. Following the 2022 election that resulted in the country's first hung parliament, the multiracial and reformist coalition formed a negotiated unity government under the leadership of longtime opposition leader Anwar Ibrahim. Perikatan Nasional (PN) acts as the main opposition at the federal level following its loss in 2022 and the leadership's refusal to participate in the unity arrangement. The far-right former ruling coalition was formed amid the 2020 crisis which led to the formation of a PN-led government under Muhyiddin Yassin. Barisan Nasional (BN), the country's former ruling coalition of 61 years, continues to retain substantial support and kingmaker capacity. The coalition had undergone a pragmatic shift in the aftermath of the last election, participating in the unity government and allying itself with PH, its longtime historical rival, as a junior coalition partner. The two coalitions also planned an electoral pact for the upcoming election, intending to avoid seat overlaps while uniting their election machineries with the goal of maintaining the pre-election status quo. Two allied and component parties of Pakatan Harapan in the previous election has ended their cooperation with PH for various reasons. MUDA defected into opposition in 2023, citing No Further Action decision on Deputy Prime Minister Zahid Hamidi's corruption scandal as trigger, eventually forming Blok Progresif with left wing parties such as Socialist Party of Malaysia (PSM). while UPKO quit before the 2025 Sabah election and decided to join GRS later, citing disagreement with federal government's reaction on court ruling on 40% oil revenue sharing promised to Sabah.

Further rupture of ties were seen in first half of 2026, both in government and opposition. On the government side, two Barisan Nasional state chapters in Negeri Sembilan and Johor triggered uncertainties of PH and BN cooperation. 14 state assemblymen of BN in Negeri Sembilan, citing mistrust with Menteri Besar Aminuddin Harun's response on the royal affair in the state, retracted their support for state government in April 2026. BN Johor, who never formed a Unity Government pact with PH Johor, decided in May 2026 to continue contesting alone in 2026 Johor state election. As result, these two states faced earlier state election where PH and BN compete against each other. On 17 May 2026, former Minister of Economy Rafizi Ramli took over BERSAMA party and together with his followers announced joint resignation as MP and defection from PKR. On the opposition side, due to strained party-to-party relations, PAS decided to break political cooperation with BERSATU on 8 June 2026. Both parties however confirmed separately they would remain members of PN. Leader of Opposition Hamzah Zainuddin and his faction were either suspended or expelled by their party BERSATU on 13 February 2026 (with some decisions made separately before and after that). While remaining as independent MPs and assemblymen, the group announced formation of WAWASAN party friendly to PAS.

In addition to the major national coalitions, a number of regional parties and coalitions in East Malaysia are expected to be key players due to their potential as kingmakers in the post-election government formation. Gabungan Parti Sarawak (GPS), a Sarawak-based coalition formed by former BN components, presently dominates politics in Sarawak and commands a significant bloc of parliamentary seats. In Sabah, the two largest parties are Gabungan Rakyat Sabah (GRS), the ruling state government, and Parti Warisan (WARISAN), the state's main opposition. GRS supports stronger federal-state cooperation and is seen as closer to the unity government, whereas WARISAN takes a more antagonistic stance against the federal government, utilising 'Sabah for Sabahan' rhetoric while simultaneously sitting in the government bench. Within GRS, the election would be the first time its main component party GAGASAN contesting in a federal election after takeover by Chief Minister Hajiji's faction. The performances of these regional parties and their decisions to align with specific national coalitions is seen as key in determining the post-election government formation owing to the country's fragmented party system.

== Constituencies ==
Electoral map of Malaysia, showing all 222 constituencies

== Composition before dissolution ==
Name		Ideology	Position	Leader	2022 result		Standing before election	Federal government
Name		Ideology	Position	Leader	Votes (%)	Seats	Standing before election	Federal government
PH	Pakatan Harapan; Alliance of Hope	Reformism	Centre to Centre-left	Anwar Ibrahim	37.95%	81 / 222	76 / 222	Government
PN	Perikatan Nasional; National Alliance	Right-wing populism	Right-wing to far-right	Ahmad Samsuri Mokhtar	30.04%	74 / 222	68 / 222	Opposition
BN	Barisan Nasional; National Front	National conservatism	Centre-right to right-wing	Ahmad Zahid Hamidi	22.24%	30 / 222	30 / 222	Government
GPS	Gabungan Parti Sarawak; Sarawak Parties Alliance	Sarawak regionalism Conservatism	Centre-right to right-wing	Abang Abdul Rahman Zohari Abang Openg	4.26%	23 / 222	23 / 222	Government
GRS	Gabungan Rakyat Sabah; Sabah People's Coalition	Sabah regionalism Conservatism	Centre to centre-right	Hajiji Noor	1.25%	6 / 222	5 / 222	Government
WARISAN	Parti Warisan; Heritage Party	Sabah regionalism Progressivism	Centre	Shafie Apdal	1.93%	3 / 222	3 / 222	Government
BERSAMA	Parti Bersama Malaysia; Malaysian United Party	Liberal Democracy; Third Way	Centre	Rafizi Ramli	—	0 / 222	0 / 222	Opposition
	Progressive Bloc	Social democracy Socialism	Centre-left to left-wing	Amira Aisya Abdul Aziz	—	0 / 222	1 / 222	Opposition

== Electoral system ==
Elections in Malaysia are conducted at the federal and state levels. Federal elections elect members of the Dewan Rakyat, the lower house of Parliament, while state elections in each of the 13 states elect members of their respective state legislative assembly. As Malaysia follows the Westminster system of government, the head of government (Prime Minister at the federal level and the Chief Ministers, the so-called Menteri Besar, at the state level) is the person who commands the confidence of the majority of members in the respective legislature – this is normally the leader of the party or coalition with the majority of seats in the legislature.

The Dewan Rakyat consists of 222 members, known as Members of Parliament (MPs), that are elected for five-year terms. Each MP is elected from a single-member constituency using the first-past-the-post voting system. If one party obtains a majority of seats, then that party is entitled to form the government, with its leader becoming the Prime Minister. In the event of a hung parliament, where no single party obtains the majority of seats, the government may still form through a coalition or a confidence and supply agreement with other parties. In practice, coalitions and alliances in Malaysia generally persist between elections, and member parties do not normally contest for the same seats.

== Timeline ==
=== Dissolution of parliament ===
The Constitution of Malaysia requires that a general election be held in the fifth calendar year after the first sitting unless it is dissolved earlier by the Yang di-Pertuan Agong following a motion of no confidence, loss of supply or a request by the prime minister.

The 15th Parliament of Malaysia first convened on 19 December 2022. If the term of the 15th Parliament reaches its maximum date, it will automatically dissolve on 19 December 2027, paving way for an election within 60 days. The latest date for the 16th General Election will therefore be on 17 February 2028.

The key dates are listed below
Dates	Events
TBA	Dissolution of parliament
TBA	Election Commission announcement of Election Day and its timeline
TBA	Issue of the Writ of Election
TBA	Nomination day
TBA	Campaigning period
TBA	Early polling day for postal and advance voters
TBA	Polling day

=== Dissolution of state legislatures ===
While any state may dissolve its legislature independently of Parliament, most of them had historically dissolved at around the same time as Parliament such that federal and state elections are held simultaneously. In accordance with Malaysian law, Parliament as well as the legislative assemblies of each state would automatically expire on the fifth anniversary of the first sitting of a term, unless dissolved prior to that date by the relevant heads of state on the advice of their respective heads of government. Elections must be held within sixty days of expiry or dissolution.

Dates of the legislature of each state would expire and their actual dissolution dates
Legislature (and term number)	Term began	Refs	Term ends (on or before)	Latest possible election date	Refs
Perlis (15th)	19 December 2022		19 December 2027	17 February 2028	
Perak (15th)	19 December 2022		19 December 2027	17 February 2028	
Pahang (15th)	29 December 2022		29 December 2027	27 February 2028	
Penang (15th)	29 August 2023		29 August 2028	28 October 2028	
Kelantan (15th)	5 September 2023		5 September 2028	4 November 2028	
Selangor (15th)	19 September 2023		19 September 2028	18 November 2028	
Terengganu (15th)	24 September 2023		24 September 2028	23 November 2028	
Kedah (15th)	25 September 2023		25 September 2028	24 November 2028	
Sabah (17th)	11 December 2025		11 December 2030	9 February 2031	
Negeri Sembilan (16th)	18 August 2026		18 August 2031	17 October 2031	
Johor (16th)	27 August 2026		27 August 2031	26 October 2031	
Malacca (16th)	TBD		TBD	TBD	
Sarawak (19th)	TBD		TBD	TBD	

== Departing incumbents ==
Members of the 15th Parliament who were not contesting the Next election
No.	Constituency	Departing MP	First elected	Party	Date announced	Reason	Refs
P159	Pasir Gudang	Hassan Abdul Karim	2018	PH (PKR)	9 March 2025	Not seeking re-election	
P142	Labis	Pang Hok Liong	2018	PH (DAP)	18 June 2026	Not seeking re-election	
P215	Kapit	Alexander Nanta Linggi	1999	GPS (PBB)	9 May 2026	Not seeking re-election	

== Prospective candidates ==
State	No.	Constituency	Incumbent		Political coalitions and respective candidates and parties																			
State	No.	Constituency	Incumbent		Barisan Nasional		Pakatan Harapan		Perikatan Nasional		Malaysian United Party		Gabungan Parti Sarawak		Gabungan Rakyat Sabah		Parti Warisan		Other parties/Independents					
State	No.	Constituency	Name	Party	Candidate name	Party	Candidate name	Party	Candidate name	Party	Candidate name	Party	Candidate name	Party	Candidate name	Party	Candidate name	Party	Candidate name	Party	Candidate name	Party	Candidate name	Party
Perlis	P001	Padang Besar	Rushdan Rusmi	PN (PAS)		UMNO		AMANAH		PAS														
Perlis	P002	Kangar	Zakri Hassan	PN (BERSATU)		UMNO	Noor Amin Ahmad	PKR	Zakri Hassan	WAWASAN	Syed Azuan Syed Ahmad	BERSAMA												
Perlis	P003	Arau	Shahidan Kassim	PN (PAS)		UMNO		PKR	Husna Hashim	PAS														
Kedah	P004	Langkawi	Mohd Suhaimi Abdullah	PN (BERSATU)		UMNO		AMANAH		WAWASAN														
Kedah	P005	Jerlun	Abdul Ghani Ahmad	PN (PAS)		UMNO		PKR	Mukhriz Mahathir	PEJUANG														
Kedah	P006	Kubang Pasu	Ku Abdul Rahman Ku Ismail	PN (BERSATU)		UMNO		PKR	Ku Abdul Rahman Ku Ismail	WAWASAN														
Kedah	P007	Padang Terap	Nurul Amin Hamid	PN (PAS)	Mahdzir Khalid	UMNO		AMANAH		PAS														
Kedah	P008	Pokok Sena	Ahmad Yahaya	PN (PAS)		UMNO	Mahfuz Omar	AMANAH	Ahmad Yahaya	PAS														
Kedah	P009	Alor Setar	Afnan Hamimi Taib Azamudden	PN (PAS)		MCA		PKR	Afnan Hamimi Taib Azamudden	PAS														
Kedah	P010	Kuala Kedah	Ahmad Fakhruddin Fakhrurazi	PN (PAS)		UMNO	Romli Ishak	PKR	Ahmad Fakhruddin Fakhrurazi	PAS														
Kedah	P011	Pendang	Awang Hashim	PN (PAS)		UMNO		PKR	Awang Hashim	PAS														
Kedah	P012	Jerai	Sabri Azit	PN (PAS)	Jamil Khir Baharom	UMNO		AMANAH		PAS														
Kedah	P013	Sik	Ahmad Tarmizi Sulaiman	PN (PAS)		UMNO		AMANAH	Takiyuddin Hassan	PAS														
Kedah	P014	Merbok	Mohd Nazri Abu Hassan	PN (BERSATU)	Shaiful Hazizy Zainol Abidin	UMNO	Nor Azrina Surip	PKR		WAWASAN														
Kedah	P015	Sungai Petani	Mohammed Taufiq Johari	PH (PKR)	Shahanim Mohamad Yusoff	UMNO	Mohammed Taufiq Johari	PKR		WAWASAN		BERSAMA												
Kedah	P016	Baling	Hassan Saad	PN (PAS)	Abdul Azeez Abdul Rahim	UMNO		AMANAH		PAS														
Kedah	P017	Padang Serai	Azman Nasrudin	PN (BERSATU)		MIC		PKR		WAWASAN		BERSAMA												
Kedah	P018	Kulim-Bandar Baharu	Roslan Hashim	PN (BERSATU)		UMNO	Saifuddin Nasution Ismail	PKR	Roslan Hashim	WAWASAN		BERSAMA												
Kelantan	P019	Tumpat	Mumtaz Md Nawi	PN (PAS)		UMNO		AMANAH		PAS														
Kelantan	P020	Pengkalan Chepa	Ahmad Marzuk Shaary	PN (PAS)		UMNO		AMANAH	Ahmad Marzuk Shaary	PAS														
Kelantan	P021	Kota Bharu	Takiyuddin Hassan	PN (PAS)		UMNO	Hafidzah Mustakim	AMANAH		PAS														
Kelantan	P022	Pasir Mas	Ahmad Fadhli Shaari	PN (PAS)		UMNO		PKR	Ahmad Fadhli Shaari	PAS														
Kelantan	P023	Rantau Panjang	Siti Zailah Mohd Yusoff	PN (PAS)		UMNO		AMANAH	Siti Zailah Mohd Yusoff	PAS														
Kelantan	P024	Kubang Kerian	Tuan Ibrahim Tuan Man	PN (PAS)		UMNO		AMANAH	Nik Muhammad Zawawi Salleh	PAS														
Kelantan	P025	Bachok	Mohd Syahir Che Sulaiman	PN (PAS)		UMNO		AMANAH	Mohd Syahir Che Sulaiman	PAS														
Kelantan	P026	Ketereh	Khlir Mohd Nor	PN (BERSATU)		UMNO		PKR	Khlir Mohd Nor	WAWASAN									Radzi Jidin	BERSATU				
Kelantan	P027	Tanah Merah	Ikmal Hisham Abdul Aziz	PN (BERSATU)		UMNO	Mohamad Suparadi Md Noor	PKR	Ikmal Hisham Abdul Aziz	WAWASAN														
Kelantan	P028	Pasir Puteh	Nik Muhammad Zawawi Salleh	PN (PAS)	Ahmad Jazlan Yaakub	UMNO		AMANAH		PAS														
Kelantan	P029	Machang	Wan Ahmad Fayhsal	PN (WAWASAN)		UMNO		PKR	Wan Ahmad Fayhsal	WAWASAN														
Kelantan	P030	Jeli	Zahari Kechik	IND	Zahari Kechik	UMNO		AMANAH		WAWASAN														
Kelantan	P031	Kuala Krai	Abdul Latiff Abdul Rahman	PN (PAS)		UMNO		AMANAH	Abdul Latiff Abdul Rahman	PAS														
Kelantan	P032	Gua Musang	Mohd Azizi Abu Naim	IND		UMNO		PKR		WAWASAN														
Terengganu	P033	Besut	Che Mohamad Zulkifly Jusoh	PN (PAS)		UMNO		AMANAH	Ahmad Samsuri Mokhtar	PAS														
Terengganu	P034	Setiu	Shaharizukirnain Abdul Kadir	PN (PAS)		UMNO		PKR		PAS														
Terengganu	P035	Kuala Nerus	Alias Razak	PN (PAS)	Ahmad Razif Abdul Rahman	UMNO		AMANAH		PAS														
Terengganu	P036	Kuala Terengganu	Ahmad Amzad Hashim	PN (PAS)		UMNO	Azan Ismail	PKR	Ahmad Amzad Hashim	PAS														
Terengganu	P037	Marang	Abdul Hadi Awang	PN (PAS)		UMNO		AMANAH	Muhammad Khalil Abdul Hadi	PAS														
Terengganu	P038	Hulu Terengganu	Rosol Wahid	PN (BERSATU)		UMNO		AMANAH	Rosol Wahid	WAWASAN														
Terengganu	P039	Dungun	Wan Hassan Mohd Ramli	PN (PAS)		UMNO	Mohd Hasbie Muda	AMANAH	Wan Hassan Mohd Ramli	PAS														
Terengganu	P040	Kemaman	Ahmad Samsuri Mokhtar	PN (PAS)		UMNO		PKR		PAS														
Pulau Pinang	P041	Kepala Batas	Siti Mastura Muhammad	PN (PAS)	Reezal Merican Naina Merican	UMNO		AMANAH		PAS														
Pulau Pinang	P042	Tasek Gelugor	Wan Saifulruddin Wan Jan	PN (WAWASAN)		UMNO		AMANAH	Wan Saifulruddin Wan Jan	WAWASAN														
Pulau Pinang	P043	Bagan	Lim Guan Eng	PH (DAP)		MCA	Lim Guan Eng	DAP		GERAKAN														
Pulau Pinang	P044	Permatang Pauh	Muhammad Fawwaz Mohamad Jan	PN (PAS)		UMNO	Anwar Ibrahim	PKR	Muhammad Fawwaz Mohamad Jan	PAS														
Pulau Pinang	P045	Bukit Mertajam	Steven Sim Chee Keong	PH (DAP)		MCA	Steven Sim Chee Keong	DAP		GERAKAN														
Pulau Pinang	P046	Batu Kawan	Chow Kon Yeow	PH (DAP)		MIC	Sundarajoo Somu	DAP	Huan Cheng Guan	WAWASAN														
Pulau Pinang	P047	Nibong Tebal	Fadhlina Sidek	PH (PKR)		UMNO	Fadhlina Sidek	PKR		WAWASAN														
Pulau Pinang	P048	Bukit Bendera	Syerleena Abdul Rashid	PH (DAP)		MCA	Sim Tze Tzin	PKR		GERAKAN														
Pulau Pinang	P049	Tanjong	Lim Hui Ying	PH (DAP)		MCA	Chris Lee Chun Kit	DAP	Oh Tong Keong	GERAKAN														
Pulau Pinang	P050	Jelutong	Sanisvara Nethaji Rayer	PH (DAP)		MIC	Yeoh Soon Hin	DAP	Baljit Singh Jigiri Singh	GERAKAN														
Pulau Pinang	P051	Bukit Gelugor	Ramkarpal Singh	PH (DAP)		MCA	Ramkarpal Singh	DAP		WAWASAN														
Pulau Pinang	P052	Bayan Baru	Sim Tze Tzin	PH (PKR)		MCA	Syerleena Abdul Rashid	DAP	Dominic Lau Hoe Chai	GERAKAN														
Pulau Pinang	P053	Balik Pulau	Muhammad Bakhtiar Wan Chik	PH (PKR)		UMNO	Muhammad Bakhtiar Wan Chik	PKR		WAWASAN		BERSAMA												
Perak	P054	Gerik	Fathul Huzir Ayob	PN (WAWASAN)	Asyraf Wajdi Dusuki	UMNO		DAP		WAWASAN														
Perak	P055	Lenggong	Shamsul Anuar Nasarah	BN (UMNO)	Shamsul Anuar Nasarah	UMNO		PKR		PAS														
Perak	P056	Larut	Hamzah Zainudin	PN (WAWASAN)		UMNO		PKR	Hamzah Zainudin	WAWASAN														
Perak	P057	Parit Buntar	Mohd Misbahul Munir Masduki	PN (PAS)		UMNO	Mujahid Yusof Rawa	AMANAH		WAWASAN														
Perak	P058	Bagan Serai	Idris Ahmad	PN (PAS)		UMNO		PKR	Idris Ahmad	PAS														
Perak	P059	Bukit Gantang	Syed Abu Hussin Hafiz Syed Abdul Fasal	IND		UMNO	Syed Abu Hussin Hafiz Syed Abdul Fasal	PKR	Khairil Nizam Khirudin	PAS														
Perak	P060	Taiping	Wong Kah Woh	PH (DAP)		MCA	Wong Kah Woh	DAP		GERAKAN														
Perak	P061	Padang Rengas	Azahari Hasan	PN (WAWASAN)	Mohamed Nazri Abdul Aziz	UMNO	Kamil Munim	PKR	Azahari Hasan	WAWASAN														
Perak	P062	Sungai Siput	Kesavan Subramaniam	PH (PKR)	Vigneswaran Sanasee	MIC	Kesavan Subramaniam	PKR		MIPP		BERSAMA												
Perak	P063	Tambun	Anwar Ibrahim	PH (PKR)		UMNO		PKR		WAWASAN									Ahmad Faizal Azumu	BERSATU				
Perak	P064	Ipoh Timor	Howard Lee Chuan How	PH (DAP)		MCA	Howard Lee Chuan How	DAP		WAWASAN														
Perak	P065	Ipoh Barat	Kulasegaran Murugeson	PH (DAP)		MIC	Sivakumar Varatharaju	DAP		MIPP														
Perak	P066	Batu Gajah	Sivakumar Varatharaju	PH (DAP)		MCA	Loh Sze Yee	DAP		GERAKAN		BERSAMA												
Perak	P067	Kuala Kangsar	Iskandar Dzulkarnain Abdul Khalid	IND	Wan Emir Astar	UMNO		AMANAH		WAWASAN														
Perak	P068	Beruas	Ngeh Koo Ham	PH (DAP)		MCA	Nga Kor Ming	DAP		GERAKAN														
Perak	P069	Parit	Muhammad Ismi Mat Taib	PN (PAS)		UMNO		AMANAH	Muhammad Ismi Mat Taib	PAS														
Perak	P070	Kampar	Chong Zhemin	PH (DAP)		MCA	Chong Zhemin	DAP		GERAKAN														
Perak	P071	Gopeng	Tan Kar Hing	PH (PKR)		MCA	Chan Ming Kai	PKR		WAWASAN	Tan Kar Hing	BERSAMA												
Perak	P072	Tapah	Saravanan Murugan	BN (MIC)	Saravanan Murugan	MIC		PKR		WAWASAN														
Perak	P073	Pasir Salak	Jamaludin Yahya	PN (PAS)		UMNO		PKR	Jamaludin Yahya	PAS														
Perak	P074	Lumut	Nordin Ahmad Ismail	PN (BERSATU)	Zambry Abdul Kadir	UMNO		AMANAH		WAWASAN														
Perak	P075	Bagan Datuk	Ahmad Zahid Hamidi	BN (UMNO)	Ahmad Zahid Hamidi	UMNO		PKR		PAS														
Perak	P076	Teluk Intan	Nga Kor Ming	PH (DAP)		MIC	Kasthuriraani Patto	DAP	Zainol Fadzi Paharudin	WAWASAN														
Perak	P077	Tanjong Malim	Chang Lih Kang	PH (PKR)	Mah Hang Soon	MCA	Chang Lih Kang	PKR		WAWASAN	Haziq Azfar Ishak	BERSAMA												
Pahang	P078	Cameron Highlands	Ramli Mohd Nor	BN (UMNO)	Ramli Mohd Nor	UMNO		DAP		WAWASAN														
Pahang	P079	Lipis	Abdul Rahman Mohamad	BN (UMNO)	Abdul Rahman Mohamad	UMNO		DAP		WAWASAN														
Pahang	P080	Raub	Chow Yu Hui	PH (DAP)	Ti Lian Ker	MCA	Chow Yu Hui	DAP		WAWASAN														
Pahang	P081	Jerantut	Khairil Nizam Khirudin	PN (PAS)		UMNO		PKR	Tuan Ibrahim Tuan Man	PAS														
Pahang	P082	Indera Mahkota	Saifuddin Abdullah	PN (WAWASAN)		UMNO	Ahmad Farhan Fauzi	PKR	Saifuddin Abdullah	WAWASAN		BERSAMA												
Pahang	P083	Kuantan	Wan Razali Wan Nor	PN (PAS)		UMNO	Fuziah Salleh	PKR	Wan Razali Wan Nor	PAS		BERSAMA												
Pahang	P084	Paya Besar	Mohd Shahar Abdullah	BN (UMNO)	Mohd Shahar Abdullah	UMNO		AMANAH		PAS														
Pahang	P085	Pekan	Sh Mohmed Puzi Sh Ali	BN (UMNO)	Nizar Najib	UMNO		PKR		PAS														
Pahang	P086	Maran	Ismail Abdul Muttalib	PN (PAS)		UMNO		AMANAH		PAS														
Pahang	P087	Kuala Krau	Kamal Ashaari	PN (PAS)		UMNO		AMANAH	Kamal Ashaari	PAS														
Pahang	P088	Temerloh	Salamiah Mohd Nor	PN (PAS)	Mohd Sharkar Shamsudin	UMNO	Mohd Fadzli Mohd Ramly	AMANAH		PAS														
Pahang	P089	Bentong	Young Syefura Othman	PH (DAP)	Chong Sin Woon	MCA	Young Syefura Othman	DAP		WAWASAN														
Pahang	P090	Bera	Ismail Sabri Yaakob	BN (UMNO)		UMNO	Manolan Mohamad	PKR		WAWASAN														
Pahang	P091	Rompin	Abdul Khalib Abdullah	PN (BERSATU)		UMNO		PKR	Abdul Khalib Abdullah	WAWASAN														
Selangor	P092	Sabak Bernam	Kalam Salan	PN (BERSATU)	Abdul Rahman Bakri	UMNO		AMANAH		WAWASAN														
Selangor	P093	Sungai Besar	Muslimin Yahaya	PN (BERSATU)		UMNO		PKR	Muslimin Yahaya	WAWASAN														
Selangor	P094	Hulu Selangor	Mohd Hasnizan Harun	PN (PAS)	Mohan Thangarasu	MIC		PKR		PAS														
Selangor	P095	Tanjong Karang	Zulkafperi Hanapi	IND	Nurul Syazwani Noh	UMNO		PKR		WAWASAN														
Selangor	P096	Kuala Selangor	Dzulkefly Ahmad	PH (AMANAH)		UMNO	Dzulkefly Ahmad	AMANAH		PAS	Faizal Rahman	BERSAMA												
Selangor	P097	Selayang	William Leong Jee Keen	PH (PKR)		MIC		PKR		WAWASAN	Chua Wei Kiat	BERSAMA												
Selangor	P098	Gombak	Amirudin Shari	PH (PKR)	Megat Zulkarnain Omardin	UMNO	Amirudin Shari	PKR		WAWASAN		BERSAMA							Azmin Ali	BERSATU				
Selangor	P099	Ampang	Rodziah Ismail	PH (PKR)	Ivone Low Yi Wen	MCA	Azman Abidin	PKR		WAWASAN	Rodziah Ismail	BERSAMA												
Selangor	P100	Pandan	Vacant	VAC		MCA	Tengku Zafrul Aziz	PKR		PAS	Rafizi Ramli	BERSAMA												
Selangor	P101	Hulu Langat	Mohd Sany Hamzan	PH (AMANAH)	Johan Abd Aziz	UMNO		AMANAH	Muhammad Faiz Rahmad	WAWASAN		BERSAMA												
Selangor	P102	Bangi	Syahredzan Johan	PH (DAP)		MIC	Syahredzan Johan	DAP	Mohd Shafie Ngah	PAS		BERSAMA												
Selangor	P103	Puchong	Yeo Bee Yin	PH (DAP)		MCA	Gobind Singh Deo	DAP		GERAKAN		BERSAMA												
Selangor	P104	Subang	Vacant	VAC		MCA		PKR		GERAKAN	Wong Chen	BERSAMA												
Selangor	P105	Petaling Jaya	Vacant	VAC		MIC	Hee Loy Sian	PKR		WAWASAN	Lee Chean Chung	BERSAMA												
Selangor	P106	Damansara	Gobind Singh Deo	PH (DAP)		MCA		DAP		GERAKAN		BERSAMA												
Selangor	P107	Sungai Buloh	Ramanan Ramakrishnan	PH (PKR)		UMNO	Ramanan Ramakrishnan	PKR		PAS		BERSAMA												
Selangor	P108	Shah Alam	Azli Yusof	PH (AMANAH)		UMNO	Azli Yusof	AMANAH	Muhammad Rafique Rashid Ali	PEJUANG		BERSAMA												
Selangor	P109	Kapar	Halimah Ali	PN (PAS)		UMNO		PKR	Halimah Ali	PAS		BERSAMA												
Selangor	P110	Klang	Ganabatirau Veraman	PH (DAP)		MCA	Ganabatirau Veraman	DAP		WAWASAN														
Selangor	P111	Kota Raja	Mohamad Sabu	PH (AMANAH)		MIC	Mohamad Sabu	AMANAH		PAS		BERSAMA												
Selangor	P112	Kuala Langat	Ahmad Yunus Hairi	PN (PAS)		MIC		PKR	Ahmad Yunus Hairi	PAS		BERSAMA												
Selangor	P113	Sepang	Aiman Athirah Sabu	PH (AMANAH)		UMNO	Aiman Athirah Sabu	AMANAH		WAWASAN		BERSAMA												
Kuala Lumpur	P114	Kepong	Lim Lip Eng	PH (DAP)		MCA	Lim Lip Eng	DAP		GERAKAN		BERSAMA												
Kuala Lumpur	P115	Batu	Prabakaran Parameswaran	PH (PKR)		MIC	Prabakaran Parameswaran	PKR	Azhar Yahya	PAS		BERSAMA												
Kuala Lumpur	P116	Wangsa Maju	Zahir Hassan	PH (PKR)	Mohd Shafei Abdullah	UMNO	Zahir Hassan	PKR		PAS		BERSAMA												
Kuala Lumpur	P117	Segambut	Hannah Yeoh Tseow Suan	PH (DAP)	Loga Bala Mohan Jaganathan	PPP		DAP		GERAKAN		BERSAMA												
Kuala Lumpur	P118	Setiawangsa	Vacant	VAC		UMNO	Afdlin Shauki Aksan	PKR		WAWASAN	Nik Nazmi Nik Ahmad	BERSAMA												
Kuala Lumpur	P119	Titiwangsa	Johari Abdul Ghani	BN (UMNO)	Johari Abdul Ghani	UMNO		AMANAH		PAS		BERSAMA												
Kuala Lumpur	P120	Bukit Bintang	Fong Kui Lun	PH (DAP)		MCA	Hannah Yeoh Tseow Suan	DAP		WAWASAN		BERSAMA												
Kuala Lumpur	P121	Lembah Pantai	Fahmi Fadzil	PH (PKR)		UMNO	Fahmi Fadzil	PKR	Muhamad Muqharabbin Mokhtarrudin	PAS		BERSAMA												
Kuala Lumpur	P122	Seputeh	Teresa Kok Suh Sim	PH (DAP)		MCA	Teresa Kok Suh Sim	DAP		GERAKAN		BERSAMA												
Kuala Lumpur	P123	Cheras	Tan Kok Wai	PH (DAP)		MCA		DAP		WAWASAN		BERSAMA												
Kuala Lumpur	P124	Bandar Tun Razak	Wan Azizah Wan Ismail	PH (PKR)		UMNO		PKR		WAWASAN		BERSAMA												
Putrajaya	P125	Putrajaya	Mohd Radzi Md Jidin	PN (BERSATU)	Khairy Jamaluddin	UMNO		PKR		WAWASAN														
Negeri Sembilan	P126	Jelebu	Jalaluddin Alias	BN (UMNO)	Jalaluddin Alias	UMNO		AMANAH		WAWASAN														
Negeri Sembilan	P127	Jempol	Shamshulkahar Mohd Deli	BN (UMNO)	Shamshulkahar Mohd Deli	UMNO		AMANAH		WAWASAN														
Negeri Sembilan	P128	Seremban	Anthony Loke	PH (DAP)		MIC	Anthony Loke	DAP		PAS														
Negeri Sembilan	P129	Kuala Pilah	Adnan Abu Hassan	BN (UMNO)	Adnan Abu Hassan	UMNO		PKR		WAWASAN														
Negeri Sembilan	P130	Rasah	Cha Kee Chin	PH (DAP)		MCA	Arul Kumar Jambunathan	DAP		GERAKAN														
Negeri Sembilan	P131	Rembau	Mohamad Hasan	BN (UMNO)	Mohamad Hasan	UMNO		PKR		WAWASAN														
Negeri Sembilan	P132	Port Dickson	Aminuddin Harun	PH (PKR)		MIC	Aminuddin Harun	PKR	Abdul Fatah Zakaria	PAS		BERSAMA												
Negeri Sembilan	P133	Tampin	Mohd Isam Mohd Isa	BN (UMNO)	Mohd Isam Mohd Isa	UMNO		AMANAH		PAS									Zamani Ibrahim	BERJASA				
Melaka	P134	Masjid Tanah	Mas Ermieyati Samsudin	PN (BERSATU)		UMNO		AMANAH	Mas Ermieyati Samsudin	WAWASAN														
Melaka	P135	Alor Gajah	Adly Zahari	PH (AMANAH)		UMNO	Adly Zahari	AMANAH		WAWASAN		BERSAMA												
Melaka	P136	Tangga Batu	Bakri Jamaluddin	PN (PAS)		UMNO		PKR	Bakri Jamaluddin	PAS		BERSAMA												
Melaka	P137	Hang Tuah Jaya	Adam Adli Abdul Halim	PH (PKR)	Mohd Ridhwan Mohd Ali	UMNO	Adam Adli Abdul Halim	PKR		WAWASAN		BERSAMA												
Melaka	P138	Kota Melaka	Khoo Poay Tiong	PH (DAP)		MCA	Khoo Poay Tiong	DAP		GERAKAN		BERSAMA												
Melaka	P139	Jasin	Zulkifli Ismail	PN (PAS)	Muhamad Akmal Saleh	UMNO		AMANAH		PAS														
Johor	P140	Segamat	Yuneswaran Ramaraj	PH (PKR)	Saraswathy Nallathamby	MIC		PKR		WAWASAN														
Johor	P141	Sekijang	Zaliha Mustafa	PH (PKR)		UMNO	Zaliha Mustafa	PKR		WAWASAN														
Johor	P142	Labis	Pang Hok Liong	PH (DAP)	Chua Tee Yong	MCA	Chew Chong Sin	DAP		WAWASAN														
Johor	P143	Pagoh	Muhyiddin Yassin	PN (BERSATU)	Razali Ibrahim	UMNO		PKR		WAWASAN									Muhyiddin Yassin	BERSATU				
Johor	P144	Ledang	Syed Ibrahim Syed Noh	PH (PKR)		UMNO	Syed Ibrahim Syed Noh	PKR	Suraya Sulaiman	PEJUANG		BERSAMA												
Johor	P145	Bakri	Tan Hong Pin	PH (DAP)		MCA		DAP		WAWASAN		BERSAMA												
Johor	P146	Muar	Syed Saddiq Syed Abdul Rahman	MUDA		UMNO		AMANAH		PAS									Syed Saddiq Syed Abdul Rahman	MUDA				
Johor	P147	Parit Sulong	Noraini Ahmad	BN (UMNO)	Noraini Ahmad	UMNO		AMANAH		PAS														
Johor	P148	Ayer Hitam	Wee Ka Siong	BN (MCA)	Wee Ka Siong	MCA		DAP		WAWASAN														
Johor	P149	Sri Gading	Aminolhuda Hassan	PH (AMANAH)		UMNO	Aminolhuda Hassan	AMANAH		PAS														
Johor	P150	Batu Pahat	Onn Abu Bakar	PH (PKR)		UMNO	Onn Abu Bakar	PKR		WAWASAN		BERSAMA												
Johor	P151	Simpang Renggam	Hasni Mohammad	BN (UMNO)	Hasni Mohammad	UMNO		PKR		WAWASAN														
Johor	P152	Kluang	Wong Shu Qi	PH (DAP)	Gan Ping Sieu	MCA		DAP		WAWASAN		BERSAMA												
Johor	P153	Sembrong	Hishammuddin Hussein	BN (UMNO)	Hishammuddin Hussein	UMNO		PKR		WAWASAN														
Johor	P154	Mersing	Muhammad Islahuddin Abas	PN (BERSATU)		UMNO		DAP	Muhammad Islahuddin Abas	WAWASAN														
Johor	P155	Tenggara	Manndzri Nasib	BN (UMNO)	Manndzri Nasib	UMNO		PKR		PAS														
Johor	P156	Kota Tinggi	Mohamed Khaled Nordin	BN (UMNO)	Mohamed Khaled Nordin	UMNO		AMANAH		WAWASAN														
Johor	P157	Pengerang	Azalina Othman Said	BN (UMNO)	Azalina Othman Said	UMNO		AMANAH		WAWASAN														
Johor	P158	Tebrau	Jimmy Puah Wee Tse	PH (PKR)		MCA		PKR		WAWASAN		BERSAMA							Amira Aisya Abd Aziz	MUDA				
Johor	P159	Pasir Gudang	Hassan Abdul Karim	PH (PKR)	Noor Azleen Ambros	UMNO	Maszlee Malik	PKR		WAWASAN		BERSAMA												
Johor	P160	Johor Bahru	Akmal Nasir	PH (PKR)	Yahya Jaafar	UMNO	Akmal Nasir	PKR		WAWASAN		BERSAMA												
Johor	P161	Pulai	Suhaizan Kayat	PH (AMANAH)		UMNO	Suhaizan Kayat	AMANAH		GERAKAN		BERSAMA												
Johor	P162	Iskandar Puteri	Liew Chin Tong	PH (DAP)		MCA	Liow Cai Tung	DAP		WAWASAN		BERSAMA												
Johor	P163	Kulai	Teo Nie Ching	PH (DAP)		MCA	Teo Nie Ching	DAP		GERAKAN		BERSAMA												
Johor	P164	Pontian	Ahmad Maslan	BN (UMNO)	Ahmad Maslan	UMNO		PKR		WAWASAN														
Johor	P165	Tanjung Piai	Wee Jeck Seng	BN (MCA)	Wee Jeck Seng	MCA		DAP		WAWASAN														
Labuan	P166	Labuan	Suhaili Abdul Rahman	IND	Mohd Rafi Alli Hassan	UMNO		AMANAH										WARISAN						
Sabah	P167	Kudat	Verdon Bahanda	IND		UMNO		PKR							Ruddy Awah	GAGASAN		WARISAN	Verdon Bahanda	IND				
Sabah	P168	Kota Marudu	Wetrom Bahanda	KDM				PKR							Julita Mojungki	PBS		WARISAN	Wetrom Bahanda	KDM				
Sabah	P169	Kota Belud	Isnaraissah Munirah Majilis	WARISAN	Salleh Said Keruak	UMNO		PKR							Mohd Arsad Bistari	GAGASAN	Isnaraissah Munirah Majilis	WARISAN	Fairuz Renddan	IND				
Sabah	P170	Tuaran	Wilfred Madius Tangau	GRS (UPKO)				PKR							Wilfred Madius Tangau	UPKO		WARISAN						
Sabah	P171	Sepanggar	Mustapha Sakmud	PH (PKR)		UMNO	Mustapha Sakmud	PKR	Aliakbar Gulasan	PAS					Mohamed Razali Razi	GAGASAN	Azis Jamman	WARISAN		KDM				
Sabah	P172	Kota Kinabalu	Chan Foong Hin	PH (DAP)		MCA	Chan Foong Hin	DAP		GERAKAN					Chin Su Phin	LDP		WARISAN		KDM				
Sabah	P173	Putatan	Shahelmey Yahya	BN (UMNO)	Jeffrey Nor Mohamed	UMNO	Awang Husaini Sahari	PKR							Shahelmey Yahya	GAGASAN		WARISAN						
Sabah	P174	Penampang	Ewon Benedick	GRS (UPKO)				PKR							Ewon Benedick	UPKO	Darell Leiking	WARISAN						
Sabah	P175	Papar	Armizan Mohd Ali	GRS (Direct)	Rosnah Shirlin	UMNO		DAP							Armizan Mohd Ali	GAGASAN	Ahmad Hassan	WARISAN						
Sabah	P176	Kimanis	Mohamad Alamin	BN (UMNO)	Mohamad Alamin	UMNO		PKR							Anifah Aman	PCS	Daud Yusof	WARISAN		KDM				
Sabah	P177	Beaufort	Siti Aminah Aching	BN (UMNO)	Awang Aslee Lakat	UMNO		PKR							Isnin Aliasnih	GAGASAN		WARISAN		KDM				
Sabah	P178	Sipitang	Matbali Musah	GRS (Direct)		UMNO		AMANAH							Matbali Musah	GAGASAN		WARISAN						
Sabah	P179	Ranau	Jonathan Yasin	GRS (Direct)		PBRS		PKR								UPKO		WARISAN		KDM				
Sabah	P180	Keningau	Jeffrey Kitingan	STAR				DAP								PBS		WARISAN	Jeffrey Kitingan	STAR		KDM		
Sabah	P181	Tenom	Riduan Rubin	IND	Raime Unggi	UMNO	Noorita Sual	DAP							Riduan Rubin	GAGASAN		WARISAN	Priscella Peter	KDM				
Sabah	P182	Pensiangan	Arthur Joseph Kurup	BN (PBRS)	Arthur Joseph Kurup	PBRS		PKR								PBS		WARISAN		KDM				
Sabah	P183	Beluran	Ronald Kiandee	PN (BERSATU)		UMNO		PKR	Ronald Kiandee	WAWASAN					James Ratib	GAGASAN		WARISAN						
Sabah	P184	Libaran	Suhaimi Nasir	BN (UMNO)	Suhaimi Nasir	UMNO		PKR							Hazem Mubarak Musa	GAGASAN	Arunarnsin Taib	WARISAN						
Sabah	P185	Batu Sapi	Khairul Firdaus Akbar Khan	GRS (Direct)		UMNO		DAP		PAS					Khairul Firdaus Akbar Khan	GAGASAN	Alias Sani	WARISAN						
Sabah	P186	Sandakan	Vivian Wong Shir Yee	PH (DAP)			Vivian Wong Shir Yee	DAP		GERAKAN						LDP	Alex Thien Ching Qiang	WARISAN		KDM				
Sabah	P187	Kinabatangan	Mohd Kurniawan Naim Moktar	BN (UMNO)	Mohd Kurniawan Naim Moktar	UMNO		PKR							Juhari Janan	GAGASAN	Saddi Abdul Rahman	WARISAN						
Sabah	P188	Lahad Datu	Yusof Apdal	WARISAN		UMNO		DAP		PAS					Abdul Hakim Gulam Hassan	GAGASAN	Yusof Apdal	WARISAN						
Sabah	P189	Semporna	Shafie Apdal	WARISAN		UMNO		PKR							Marunda K K Ampong	GAGASAN	Shafie Apdal	WARISAN						
Sabah	P190	Tawau	Lo Su Fui	GRS (PBS)				PKR		PAS					Lo Su Fui	PBS		WARISAN						
Sabah	P191	Kalabakan	Andi Muhammad Suryady Bandy	BN (UMNO)		UMNO		PKR		PAS					Liew Yun Fah	PHRS	Sarifuddin Hata	WARISAN						
Sarawak	P192	Mas Gading	Mordi Bimol	PH (DAP)			Mordi Bimol	DAP		PEJUANG			Joseph Emmanuel	PDP										
Sarawak	P193	Santubong	Nancy Shukri	GPS (PBB)				AMANAH		WAWASAN				PBB										
Sarawak	P194	Petra Jaya	Fadillah Yusof	GPS (PBB)				PKR		WAWASAN			Fadillah Yusof	PBB										
Sarawak	P195	Bandar Kuching	Kelvin Yii Lee Wuen	PH (DAP)			Kelvin Yii Lee Wuen	DAP		WAWASAN				SUPP										
Sarawak	P196	Stampin	Chong Chieng Jen	PH (DAP)			Chong Chieng Jen	DAP		WAWASAN			See Chee How	SUPP										
Sarawak	P197	Kota Samarahan	Rubiah Wang	GPS (PBB)				AMANAH		WAWASAN			Abdul Karim Rahman Hamzah	PBB										
Sarawak	P198	Puncak Borneo	Willie Mongin	GPS (PBB)				PKR		WAWASAN			Willie Mongin	PBB										
Sarawak	P199	Serian	Richard Riot Jaem	GPS (SUPP)				DAP		WAWASAN			Chali @ Charlie Unggang	PDP										
Sarawak	P200	Batang Sadong	Rodiyah Sapiee	GPS (PBB)				AMANAH					Rodiyah Sapiee	PBB										
Sarawak	P201	Batang Lupar	Mohamad Shafizan Kepli	GPS (PBB)				AMANAH	Mohammad Arifiriazul Paijo	PAS			Mohamad Shafizan Kepli	PBB										
Sarawak	P202	Sri Aman	Doris Sophia Brodi	GPS (PRS)				PKR		WAWASAN			Doris Sophia Brodi	PRS										
Sarawak	P203	Lubok Antu	Roy Angau Gingkoi	GPS (PRS)				PKR	Jugah Muyang	WAWASAN			Roy Angau Gingkoi	PRS										
Sarawak	P204	Betong	Richard Rapu	GPS (PBB)				PKR		WAWASAN			Richard Rapu	PBB										
Sarawak	P205	Saratok	Ali Biju	PN (BERSATU)				PKR		WAWASAN			Pele Peter Tinggom	PDP										
Sarawak	P206	Tanjong Manis	Yusuf Abd Wahab	GPS (PBB)				AMANAH					Yusuf Abd Wahab	PBB										
Sarawak	P207	Igan	Ahmad Johnie Zawawi	GPS (PBB)				AMANAH					Ahmad Johnie Zawawi	PBB										
Sarawak	P208	Sarikei	Huang Tiong Sii	GPS (SUPP)			Roderick Wong Siew Lead	DAP		WAWASAN			Huang Tiong Sii	SUPP										
Sarawak	P209	Julau	Larry Sng Wei Shien	PBM				PKR						PDP					Larry Sng Wei Shien	PBM				
Sarawak	P210	Kanowit	Aaron Ago Dagang	GPS (PRS)				PKR		WAWASAN				PRS										
Sarawak	P211	Lanang	Alice Lau Kiong Yieng	PH (DAP)			Alice Lau Kiong Yieng	DAP		WAWASAN				SUPP										
Sarawak	P212	Sibu	Oscar Ling Chai Yew	PH (DAP)			Oscar Ling Chai Yew	DAP		WAWASAN				PDP										
Sarawak	P213	Mukah	Hanifah Hajar Taib	GPS (PBB)				PKR		PAS			Hanifah Hajar Taib	PBB										
Sarawak	P214	Selangau	Edwin Banta	GPS (PRS)				PKR		WAWASAN			Rita Sarimah Patrick Insol	PRS										
Sarawak	P215	Kapit	Alexander Nanta Linggi	GPS (PBB)				PKR		WAWASAN				PBB										
Sarawak	P216	Hulu Rajang	Wilson Ugak Kumbong	GPS (PRS)				PKR		WAWASAN			Wilson Ugak Kumbong	PRS										
Sarawak	P217	Bintulu	Tiong King Sing	GPS (PDP)				DAP		WAWASAN			Steven Kong Kai Seng	PDP										
Sarawak	P218	Sibuti	Lukanisman Awang Sauni	GPS (PBB)				PKR		PEJUANG			Lukanisman Awang Sauni	PBB										
Sarawak	P219	Miri	Chiew Choon Man	PH (PKR)			Chiew Choon Man	PKR		WAWASAN			Yiak Chiong Wei	PDP										
Sarawak	P220	Baram	Anyi Ngau	GPS (PDP)			Roland Engan	PKR		WAWASAN			Anyi Ngau	PDP										
Sarawak	P221	Limbang	Hasbi Habibollah	GPS (PBB)				PKR		PAS			Hasbi Habibollah	PBB										
Sarawak	P222	Lawas	Henry Sum Agong	GPS (PBB)				PKR		WAWASAN			Awang Tengah Ali Hasan	PBB										

== Election pendulum ==
The 15th General Election witnessed 148 governmental seats and 74 non-governmental seats filled the Dewan Rakyat. The government side has 43 safe seats and 9 fairly safe seats, while the other side has 21 safe seats and 10 fairly safe seats.

=== Pre-election pendulum ===
GOVERNMENT SEATS
Marginal
Lubok Antu	Roy Angau Gingkoi	PRS	34.44
Tenom	Riduan Rubin	IND	35.00
Kuala Selangor	Dzulkefly Ahmad	AMANAH	35.88
Tanjong Malim	Chang Lih Kang	PKR	36.08
Beaufort	Siti Aminah Aching	UMNO	36.08
Kudat	Verdon Bahanda	IND	36.19
Muar	Syed Saddiq Syed Abdul Rahman	MUDA	37.55
Bentong	Young Syefura Othman	DAP	37.62
Sri Gading	Aminolhuda Hassan	AMANAH	37.94
Tampin	Mohd Isam Mohd Isa	UMNO	38.15
Raub	Chow Yu Hui	DAP	38.43
Balik Pulau	Muhammad Bakhtiar Wan Chik	PKR	38.43
Sepanggar	Mustapha Sakmud	PKR	38.44
Alor Gajah	Adly Zahari	AMAHAH	38.60
Sungai Petani	Mohd Taufiq Johari	PKR	38.91
Tawau	Lo Su Fui	PBS	39.19
Sekijang	Zaliha Mustafa	PKR	39.27
Sungai Buloh	Ramanan Ramakrishnan	PKR	39.30
Putatan	Shahelmey Yahaya	UMNO	39.36
Bagan Datuk	Ahmad Zahid Hamidi	UMNO	39.61
Tambun	Anwar Ibrahim	PKR	39.77
Ayer Hitam	Wee Ka Siong	MCA	40.50
Julau	Larry Sng Wei Shien	PBM	40.64
Sepang	Aiman Athirah	AMANAH	40.78
Pontian	Ahmad Maslan	UMNO	40.81
Parit Sulong	Noraini Ahmad	UMNO	40.89
Kanowit	Aaron Ago Dagang	PRS	41.07
Titiwangsa	Johari Abdul Ghani	UMNO	41.15
Tenggara	Manndzri Nasib	UMNO	41.26
Tapah	Saravanan Murugan	MIC	41.36
Simpang Renggam	Hasni Mohammad	UMNO	41.49
Hang Tuah Jaya	Adam Adli Abdul Halim	PKR	41.72
Kimanis	Mohamad Alamin	UMNO	41.86
Sungai Siput	Kesavan Subramaniam	PKR	41.89
Ledang	Syed Ibrahim Syed Noh	PKR	41.90
Jempol	Shamsulkahar Mohd Deli	UMNO	41.98
Keningau	Jeffrey Kitingan	STAR	42.20
Hulu Langat	Mohd Sany Hamzan	AMANAH	42.68
Tuaran	Wilfred Madius Tangau	UPKO	42.84
Tanjung Piai	Wee Jeck Seng	MCA	43.22
Paya Besar	Mohd Shahar Abdullah	UMNO	43.40
Gombak	Amirudin Shari	PKR	43.69
Kuala Pilah	Adnan Abu Hassan	UMNO	44.02
Sri Aman	Doris Sophia Brodie	PRS	44.27
Batu Sapi	Khairul Firdaus Akbar Khan	BERSATU Sabah	44.95
Shah Alam	Azli Yusof	AMANAH	45.23
Batu Pahat	Onn Abu Bakar	PKR	45.47
Lenggong	Shamsul Anuar Nasarah	UMNO	45.48
Johor Bahru	Akmal Nasrullah Mohd Nasir	PKR	45.82
Setiawangsa	Nik Nazmi Nik Ahmad	PKR	46.06
Lembah Pantai	Ahmad Fahmi Mohamed Fadzli	PKR	46.09
Segamat	Yuneswaran Ramaraj	PKR	46.27
Labis	Pang Hok Liong	DAP	46.43
Kota Belud	Isnaraissah Munirah Majilis	WARISAN	46.54
Lahad Datu	Mohammad Yusof Apdal	WARISAN	46.64
Bandar Tun Razak	Wan Azizah Wan Ismail	PKR	46.74
Sibu	Oscar Ling Chai Yew	DAP	47.45
Kalabakan	Andi Muhammad Suryady Bandy	UMNO	47.68
Pasir Gudang	Hassan Abdul Karim	PKR	47.72
Jelebu	Jalaluddin Alias	UMNO	48.10
Cameron Highlands	Ramli Mohd Nor	UMNO	48.46
Rembau	Mohamad Hasan	UMNO	48.50
Kota Marudu	Wetrom Bahanda	KDM	48.69
Lipis	Abdul Rahman Mohamad	UMNO	49.29
Wangsa Maju	Zahir Hassan	PKR	49.63
Sipitang	Matbali Musah	BERSATU Sabah	49.75
Tebrau	Jimmy Puah Wee Tse	PKR	49.99
Bakri	Tan Hong Pin	DAP	50.09
Selayang	William Leong Jee Keen	PKR	50.23
Miri	Chiew Choon Man	PKR	50.61
Pekan	Sh Mohmed Puzi Sh Ali	UMNO	50.96
Teluk Intan	Nga Kor Ming	DAP	51.61
Kampar	Chong Zhemin	DAP	51.30
Libaran	Suhaimi Nasir	UMNO	51.58
Seremban	Anthony Loke Siew Fook	DAP	51.84
Pengerang	Azalina Othman Said	UMNO	51.96
Papar	Armizan Mohd Ali	BERSATU Sabah	51.99
Kluang	Wong Shu Qi	DAP	52.08
Port Dickson	Aminuddin Harun	PKR	52.40
Batu	Prabakaran Parameswaran	PKR	52.46
Pensiangan	Arthur Joseph Kurup	PBRS	52.88
Nibong Tebal	Fadhlina Sidek	PKR	53.20
Stampin	Chong Chieng Jen	DAP	53.30
Bera	Ismail Sabri Yaakob	UMNO	53.34
Ranau	Jonathan Yasin	BERSATU Sabah	53.44
Kota Tinggi	Mohamed Khaled Nordin	UMNO	53.68
Gopeng	Tan Kar Hing	PKR	53.92
Sandakan	Vivian Wong Shir Yee	DAP	53.92
Ampang	Rodziah Ismail	PKR	54.35
Mas Gading	Mordi Bimol	DAP	55.05
Sarikei	Huang Tiong Sii	SUPP	55.07
Sembrong	Hishammuddin Hussein	UMNO	55.15
Pulai	Salahuddin Ayub	AMANAH	55.33
Taiping	Wong Kah Woh	DAP	55.56
Selangau	Edwin Banta	PRS	55.83
Fairly safe
Kulai	Teo Nie Ching	DAP	56.86
Lanang	Alice Lau Kiong Yieng	DAP	56.89
Petaling Jaya	Lee Chean Chung	PKR	57.12
Serian	Richard Riot Jaem	SUPP	57.23
Penampang	Ewon Benedick	UPKO	57.30
Kinabatangan	Bung Moktar Radin	UMNO	57.38
Puncak Borneo	Willie Mongin	PBB	57.58
Bangi	Syahredzan Johan	DAP	57.95
Iskandar Puteri	Liew Chin Tong	DAP	59.15
Safe
Kota Melaka	Khoo Poay Tiong	DAP	60.07
Bayan Baru	Sim Tze Tzin	PKR	61.54
Betong	Richard Rapu Amaan Begri	PBB	61.69
Bintulu	Tiong King Sing	PDP	61.73
Baram	Anyi Ngau	PDP	61.78
Kota Raja	Mohamad Sabu	AMANAH	62.36
Lawas	Henry Sum Agong	PBB	62.40
Pandan	Mohd Rafizi Ramli	PKR	63.98
Beruas	Ngeh Koo Ham	DAP	64.72
Sibuti	Lukanisman Awang Sauni	PBB	65.31
Puchong	Yeo Bee Yin	DAP	65.67
Hulu Rajang	Wilson Ugak Kumbaong	PRS	66.03
Rasah	Cha Kee Chin	DAP	68.04
Klang	Ganabatirau Veraman	DAP	70.49
Kota Kinabalu	Chan Foong Hin	DAP	71.08
Batang Lupar	Mohamad Shafizan Kepli	PBB	71.22
Jelutong	Sanisvara Nethaji Rayer Rajaji	DAP	71.24
Bandar Kuching	Kelvin Yii Lee Wuen	DAP	71.34
Ipoh Timor	Howard Lee Chuan How	DAP	72.13
Batu Kawan	Chow Kon Yeow	DAP	73.72
Semporna	Mohammad Shafie Apdal	WARISAN	73.77
Kapit	Alexander Nanta Linggi	PBB	75.10
Limbang	Hasbi Habibollah	PBB	75.25
Kota Samarahan	Rubiah Wang	PBB	76.71
Bukit Mertajam	Steven Sim Chee Keong	DAP	77.33
Subang	Wong Chen	PKR	77.68
Mukah	Hanifah Hajar Taib	PBB	78.23
Bukit Bendera	Syerleena Abdul Rashid	DAP	78.98
Petra Jaya	Fadillah Yusof	PBB	79.15
Segambut	Hannah Yeoh Tseow Suan	DAP	80.05
Bagan	Lim Guan Eng	DAP	81.27
Batu Gajah	Sivakumar Varatharaju Naidu	DAP	81.38
Ipoh Barat	Kulasegaran Murugeson	DAP	81.57
Damansara	Gobind Singh Deo	DAP	81.67
Bukit Gelugor	Ramkarpal Singh	DAP	82.73
Bukit Bintang	Fong Kui Lun	DAP	82.79
Batang Sadong	Rodiyah Sapiee	PBB	83.18
Seputeh	Teresa Kok Suh Sim	DAP	83.74
Cheras	Tan Kok Wai	DAP	84.04
Santubong	Nancy Shukri	PBB	84.42
Tanjong	Lim Hui Ying	DAP	84.83
Tanjong Manis	Yusuf Abd Wahab	PBB	86.52
Kepong	Lim Lip Eng	DAP	88.92
Igan	Ahmad Johnie Zawawi	PBB	93.16

NON-GOVERNMENT SEATS
Marginal
Labuan	Suhaili Abd Rahman	BERSATU	28.56
Tanjong Karang	Zulkafperi Hanapi	BERSATU	35.26
Lumut	Nordin Ahmad Ismail	BERSATU	35.43
Jasin	Zulkifli Ismail	PAS	35.95
Temerloh	Salamiah Mohd Nor	PAS	37.43
Hulu Selangor	Mohd Hasnizan Harun	PAS	38.24
Beluran	Ronald Kiandee	BERSATU	38.53
Sungai Besar	Muslimin Yahaya	BERSATU	38.75
Kuala Kangsar	Iskandar Dzulkarnain	BERSATU	40.27
Tangga Batu	Bakri Jamaluddin	PAS	40.65
Kepala Batas	Siti Mastura Muhammad	PAS	41.27
Kapar	Halimah Ali	PAS	41.61
Kuala Langat	Ahmad Yunus Hairi	PAS	42.68
Permatang Pauh	Muhammad Fawwaz Mohamad Jan	PAS	43.04
Padang Rengas	Azahari Hasan	BERSATU	43.28
Gerik	Fathul Huzir Ayob	PAS	43.64
Pasir Salak	Jamaludin Yahya	PAS	43.66
Putrajaya	Mohd Radzi Mohd Jidin	BERSATU	43.67
Kangar	Zakri Hassan	BERSATU	43.70
Sabak Bernam	Kalam Salan	BERSATU	43.86
Parit Buntar	Mohd Misbahul Munir Masduki	PAS	43.90
Mersing	Muhammad Islahuddin Abas	BERSATU	44.91
Gua Musang	Mohd Azizi Abu Naim	BERSATU	45.12
Bukit Gantang	Syed Abu Hussin Syed Abdul Fasal	BERSATU	45.59
Parit	Muhammad Ismi Mat Taib	PAS	45.76
Pagoh	Muhyiddin Md Yasin	BERSATU	45.94
Tasek Gelugor	Wan Saifulruddin Wan Jan	BERSATU	46.36
Masjid Tanah	Mas Ermieyati Samsudin	BERSATU	46.77
Kuala Krau	Kamal Ashaari	PAS	47.13
Rompin	Abdul Khalib Abdullah	BERSATU	47.20
Maran	Ismail Abd Muttalib	PAS	47.70
Jerantut	Khairil Nizam Khirudin	PAS	47.49
Alor Setar	Afnan Hamimi Taib Azamuddin	PAS	48.69
Kulim-Bandar Baharu	Roslan Hashim	BERSATU	49.00
Merbok	Mohd Nazri Abu Hassan	BERSATU	51.27
Padang Besar	Rusydan Rusmi	PAS	53.58
Langkawi	Mohd Suhaimi Abdullah	BERSATU	53.63
Kota Bharu	Takiyuddin Hassan	PAS	53.67
Bagan Serai	Idris Ahmad	PAS	53.98
Larut	Hamzah Zainudin	BERSATU	54.65
Machang	Wan Ahmad Fayhsal Wan Ahmad Kamal	BERSATU	54.68
Fairly safe
Kuala Kedah	Ahmad Fakhruddin Fakhrurazi	PAS	56.03
Padang Serai	Azman Nasrudin	BERSATU	56.49
Kubang Pasu	Ku Abd Rahman Ku Ismail	BERSATU	57.05
Padang Terap	Nurul Amin Hamid	PAS	58.03
Besut	Che Mohamad Zulkifly Jusoh	PAS	58.07
Kemaman	Che Alias Hamid	PAS	58.11
Baling	Hassan Saad	PAS	59.13
Pokok Sena	Ahmad Saad Yahya	PAS	59.44
Hulu Terengganu	Rosol Wahid	BERSATU	59.59
Setiu	Shaharizukirnain Abdul Kadir	PAS	59.85
Safe
Jerai	Sabri Azit	PAS	60.10
Jerlun	Abd Ghani Ahmad	BERSATU	60.69
Saratok	Ali Biju	BERSATU	62.33
Tumpat	Mumtaz Md Nawi	PAS	62.51
Rantau Panjang	Siti Zailah Mohd Yusoff	PAS	62.38
Jeli	Zahari Kechik	BERSATU	63.03
Bachok	Mohd Syahir Che Sulaiman	PAS	63.89
Ketereh	Khlir Mohd Nor	BERSATU	64.49
Pendang	Awang Solahudin	PAS	64.83
Kuala Nerus	Alias Razak	PAS	64.70
Kuala Terengganu	Ahmad Amzad Mohamed Hashim	PAS	65.27
Pasir Puteh	Nik Muhammad Zawawi Salleh	PAS	65.37
Dungun	Wan Hassan Mohd Ramli	PAS	65.43
Marang	Abdul Hadi Awang	PAS	67.04
Arau	Shahidan Kassim	PAS	67.23
Sik	Ahmad Tarmizi Sulaiman	PAS	67.64
Kuala Krai	Abdul Latiff Abdul Rahman	PAS	66.08
Pasir Mas	Ahmad Fadhli Shaari	PAS	68.21
Kubang Kerian	Tuan Ibrahim Tuan Man	PAS	68.38
Pengkalan Chepa	Ahmad Marzuk Shaary	PAS	69.36
Tanah Merah	Ikmal Hisham Abdul Aziz	BERSATU	77.87
