= Parti Hati Rakyat Malaysia =

- Abbreviation: Hati
- Founder: Chan Tse Yuen
- Founded: 27 June 2025
- Legalised: 18 June 2025
- Split from: Malaysian Chinese Association
- Headquarters: Kuala Lumpur, Malaysia
- Political position: Left-wing
- Colours: Lavender

The Parti Hati Rakyat Malaysia (lit. 'Malaysian People's Heart Party') is a left-wing party formed by former MCA Youth deputy chairman Chan Tse Yuen. It formed as a splinter party of MCA in 2025 as an alternative to parties in Malaysian Unity Government.

== History ==
The party creation were announced by Frederick Ng, secretary of the party on 26th June 2025. The party agenda is promote people's wellness and aimed to be inclusive, unity and respect to the Constitution of Malaysia.

The party aimed to compete on all 222 parliamentary seats and all state seats in next Malaysian general election.

== List of party leaders ==
#	Name	Took office	Left office
1	Chan Tse Yuen	2025	-

== See also ==
- Politics of Malaysia
- List of political parties in Malaysia
