= Chenderoh =

Malaysian federal constituency

Perak constituency

Defunct federal constituency
- Legislature: Dewan Rakyat
- Constituency created: 1994
- Constituency abolished: 2004
- First contested: 1995
- Last contested: 1999

Chenderoh was a federal constituency in Perak, Malaysia, that was represented in the Dewan Rakyat from 1995 to 2004.

The federal constituency was created in the 1994 redistribution and was mandated to return a single member to the Dewan Rakyat under the first past the post voting system.

== History ==
It was abolished in 2004 when it was redistributed.

=== Representation history ===
Members of Parliament for Chenderoh
Parliament	No	Years	Member	Party	Vote Share
Constituency created, renamed from Tasek Chenderoh
9th	P058	1995-1999	Mohamed Nazri Abdul Aziz (محمد نظري عبدالعزيز)	BN (UMNO)	16,983; 76.59%
10th	P058	1999-2004	Mohamed Nazri Abdul Aziz (محمد نظري عبدالعزيز)	BN (UMNO)	13,374; 58.77%
Constituency abolished, split into Lenggong and Padang Rengas

=== State constituency ===
Parliamentary constituency	State constituency						
Parliamentary constituency	1955–59*	1959–1974	1974–1986	1986–1995	1995–2004	2004–2018	2018–present
Chenderoh					Lenggong		
Chenderoh					Lubok Merbau		

=== Historical boundaries ===
State Constituency	Area
State Constituency	1994
Lenggong	FELCRA Kampung Chepor; Kampung Batu Ring; Kampung Kuak; Lenggong; Sauk
Lubok Merbau	Kampung Baru Liman Kati; Kampung Tiong; Kota Lama Kiri; Lubok Merbau; Padang Rengas

== Election results ==
Malaysian general election, 1999: Chenderoh
Party	Candidate	Votes	%	∆%
BN	Mohamed Nazri Abdul Aziz	13,374	58.77	▼17.82
PKR	Hamzah Mohd Zain	9,384	41.23	▲41.23
Total valid votes		22,758	100.00	
Total rejected ballots		587		
Unreturned ballots		52		
Turnout		23,397	64.77	
Registered electors		36,121		
Majority		3,990	17.54	▼35.64
BN hold		Swing		

Malaysian general election, 1995: Chenderoh
Party	Candidate	Votes	%
BN	Mohamed Nazri Abdul Aziz	16,983	76.59
S46	Saidin Mat Piah	5,190	23.41
Total valid votes		22,173	100.00
Total rejected ballots		872	
Unreturned ballots		96	
Turnout		23,141	67.31
Registered electors		34,381	
Majority		11,793	53.18
This was a new constituency created.
