= Tasek Chenderoh (federal constituency) =

Former federal constituency in Malaysia

Perak constituency

Defunct federal constituency
- Legislature: Dewan Rakyat
- Constituency created: 1984
- Constituency abolished: 1995
- First contested: 1986
- Last contested: 1990

Tasek Chenderoh was a federal constituency in Perak, Malaysia, that was represented in the Dewan Rakyat from 1986 to 1995.

The federal constituency was created in the 1984 redistribution and was mandated to return a single member to the Dewan Rakyat under the first past the post voting system.

== History ==
It was abolished in 1995 when it was redistributed.

=== Representation history ===
Members of Parliament for Tasek Chenderoh
Parliament	No	Years	Member	Party	Vote Share
Constituency created from Padang Rengas and Kuala Kangsar
7th	P055	1986-1990	Saidin Mat Piah (سعيدين مت ڤياه)	BN (UMNO)	14,662; 70.17%
8th	P055	1990-1995	Hamzah Mohamed Zain (حمزه محمد زاين)	BN (UMNO)	14,296; 65.40%
Constituency abolished, renamed to Chenderoh

=== State constituency ===
Parliamentary constituency	State constituency						
Parliamentary constituency	1955–59*	1959–1974	1974–1986	1986–1995	1995–2004	2004–2018	2018–present
Tasek Chenderoh				Lenggong			
Tasek Chenderoh				Lubok Merbau			

=== Historical boundaries ===
State Constituency	Area
State Constituency	1984
Lenggong	Lenggong; Kampung Batu Ring; Kampung Beng; Kampung Ulu Chepur; Kampung Ulu Jepai
Lubok Merbau	Lubok Merbau; Kampung Buaya; Kati; Kota Lama Kiri; Padang Rengas

== Election results ==
Malaysian general election, 1990
Party	Candidate	Votes	%	∆%
BN	Hamzah Mohamed Zain	14,396	65.40	▼4.77
S46	Saidin Mat Piah	7,617	34.60	▲34.60
Total valid votes		22,013	100.00	
Total rejected ballots		635		
Unreturned ballots		0		
Turnout		22,648	69.44	▲3.14
Registered electors		32,614		
Majority		6,779	30.80	▼9.54
BN hold		Swing		

Malaysian general election, 1986
Party	Candidate	Votes	%
BN	Saidin Mat Piah	14,662	70.17
PAS	Azizan Mohamed Desa	6,234	29.83
Total valid votes		20,896	100.00
Total rejected ballots		594	
Unreturned ballots		0	
Turnout		21,490	66.30
Registered electors		32,415	
Majority		8,428	40.34
This was a new constituency created.
