= Mohamed Nazri Abdul Aziz =

Malaysian politician and diplomat

Yang Berbahagia Dato' Seri Mohamed Nazri Abdul Aziz SPMP SSAP DMSM DJMK
- محمد نظري عبدالعزيز
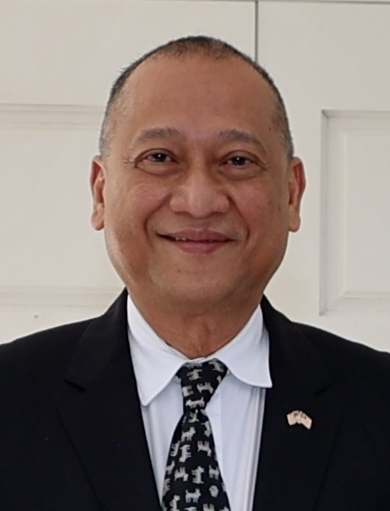
- Nazri in 2023

17th Malaysian Ambassador to the United States
- In office 9 February 2023 – 8 February 2025
- Monarchs: Abdullah; Ibrahim
- Prime Minister: Anwar Ibrahim
- Preceded by: Azmil Mohd Zabidi
- Succeeded by: Muhammad Shahrul Ikram Yaakob

Minister of Tourism and Culture
- In office 16 May 2013 – 9 May 2018
- Monarchs: Abdul Halim; Muhammad V
- Prime Minister: Najib Razak
- Deputy: Mas Ermieyati Samsudin (2015–2018)
- Preceded by: Ng Yen Yen (Tourism); Rais Yatim (Culture)
- Succeeded by: Mohammadin Ketapi as Minister of Tourism, Arts and Culture
- Constituency: Padang Rengas

Minister in the Prime Minister's Department Legal Affairs
- In office 27 March 2004 – 15 May 2013 Serving with Mohd Radzi Sheikh Ahmad (2004–2006); Zaid Ibrahim (2008)
- Monarchs: Sirajuddin; Mizan Zainal Abidin; Abdul Halim
- Prime Minister: Abdullah Ahmad Badawi; Najib Razak
- Deputy: M. Kayveas (2004–2008); Hasan Malek (2008–2009); Liew Vui Keong (2009–2013); Murugiah Thopasamy (2009–2011)
- Preceded by: Rais Yatim
- Succeeded by: Nancy Shukri; Shahidan Kassim
- Constituency: Padang Rengas

Minister of Entrepreneur Development
- In office 15 December 1999 – 26 March 2004
- Monarchs: Salahuddin; Sirajuddin
- Prime Minister: Mahathir Mohamad; Abdullah Ahmad Badawi
- Deputy: Mohd Khalid Mohd Yunos (2002–2004)
- Preceded by: Mustapa Mohamed
- Succeeded by: Mohamed Khaled Nordin as Minister of Entrepreneur and Co-operative Development
- Constituency: Chenderoh

Deputy Minister of Finance I
- In office 12 November 1996 – 14 December 1999
- Monarchs: Ja'afar; Salahuddin
- Prime Minister: Mahathir Mohamad
- Minister: Anwar Ibrahim (1996–1998); Mahathir Mohamad (1998–1999); Mustapa Mohamed (1998–1999); Daim Zainuddin (1999)
- Preceded by: Affifudin Omar
- Succeeded by: Shafie Salleh
- Constituency: Chenderoh

Deputy Minister in the Prime Minister's Department
- In office 8 May 1995 – 12 November 1996
- Monarch: Ja'afar
- Prime Minister: Mahathir Mohamad
- Minister: Abang Abu Bakar Abang Mustapha
- Preceded by: Suleiman Mohamed; Wong See Wah
- Succeeded by: Ibrahim Ali
- Constituency: Chenderoh

Member of the Malaysian Parliament for Padang Rengas
- In office 21 March 2004 – 19 November 2022
- Preceded by: Position established
- Succeeded by: Azahari Hasan (PN–BERSATU)
- Majority: 5,563 (2004); 1,749 (2008); 2,230 (2013); 2,548 (2018)

Member of the Malaysian Parliament for Chenderoh
- In office 25 April 1995 – 21 March 2004
- Preceded by: Position established
- Succeeded by: Position abolished
- Majority: 11,793 (1995); 3,990 (1999)

Faction represented in Dewan Rakyat
- 1995–2022: Barisan Nasional

Personal details
- Born: Mohamed Nazri bin Abdul Aziz; 15 May 1954 (age 71) Kuala Kangsar, Perak, Federation of Malaya (now Malaysia)
- Citizenship: Malaysian
- Party: United Malays National Organisation (UMNO)
- Other political affiliations: Barisan Nasional (BN)
- Education: Malay College Kuala Kangsar
- Alma mater: Lincoln's Inn (LLB)
- Occupation: Politician
- Profession: Barrister

Mohamed Nazri bin Abdul Aziz (Jawi: محمد نظري بن عبدالعزيز; born 15 May 1954) is a Malaysian politician and barrister who served as Malaysian Ambassador to the United States from February 2023 to February 2025.

He was also the Minister of Tourism and Culture from May 2013 to May 2018, Minister in the Prime Minister's Department in charge of legal affairs from March 2004 to May 2013, Minister of Entrepreneur Development from December 1999 to March 2004, Deputy Minister of Finance I from November 1996 to December 1999, Deputy Minister in the Prime Minister's Department from May 1995 to November 1996 and the Member of Parliament (MP) for Padang Rengas from March 2004 to November 2022.

== Early life and education ==
Mohamed Nazri bin Abdul Aziz was born in Kuala Kangsar, Perak, Malaysia. He is the alumnus of Malay College Kuala Kangsar. He has an educational background in law and is qualified as a barrister of Lincoln's Inn.

== Political career ==
Nazri was described as the hatchetman for then prime minister Abdullah Ahmad Badawi by Mahathir Mohamad.

In 2009, a photo of a woman and a man, alleged to be Nazri, in a compromising position was posted on a blog. Nazri refused to comment when contacted by the media but politicians close to him denied that it was Nazri in the photo.

In 2010, he came out openly in the defence of Prime Minister Najib's 1Malaysia policy, saying that he is a "Malaysian first and a Malay next". This was an inverse of then deputy prime minister Muhyiddin Yassin's statement that he was Malay first and Malaysian second.

In 2016, he was criticised for his decision of threatening to stop tourism funding from his ministry to Sabah and Sarawak if both the states did not implement a proposed tourism service tax fee of between RM5 and RM30 on each hotel room booking.

Following criticism over his tourism tax fee plan by Sarawak State Tourism, Arts, Culture, Youth and Sports Minister Abdul Karim Rahman Hamzah, Nazri responded by referring to the Karim as a “greenhorn” and “behaving like a gangster”. His response received backlash from other government-allied parties. As a result of his comment, the Sarawak state government made a decision to withdraw their participation from Tourism Malaysia.

Nazri has called for the seasonal flooding in Kelantan to be turned into tourist attractions on two occasions, eliciting backlash.

In 2019, Nazri questioned the appointment of non-Muslims to the posts of Attorney General, Chief Justice and Finance Minister during a campaign speech, describing it as a threat to the position of Malays in the country. He also warned non-Bumiputeras not to question the special rights afforded to the Malay population, using vernacular schools as an example of special rights given to non-Malays. He further stated that if non-Malays wanted to abolish the special rights afforded to the Malay population, vernacular schools would need to be closed to make it fair. When questioned about his statement on closing vernacular schools by media, he claimed to have been taken out of context.

In January 2021 during the 2020–2022 Malaysian political crisis, Nazri publicly announced that he was withdrawing his support as a member of parliament for the then-ruling Perikatan Nasional government of Muhyiddin Yassin, which the United Malays National Organisation (UMNO) participated in through Barisan Nasional as a junior partner. He also stated that a majority of Barisan Nasional MPs did not want the coalition's chairman, Ahmad Zahid Hamidi, as their spokesman. Amid reports that UMNO MPs were being summoned to withdraw their support for the government by August the same year, Nazri reversed his earlier decision and announced that he was in support of the incumbent administration, citing the party's general assembly's resolution to do so until the next election.

== Personal life ==
He is married and has a daughter and three sons named Ferasha Mohamed Nazri, Mohamed Ferhad Mohamed Nazri and Mohamed Nedim Mohamed Nazri. Then, he married Haflin Saiful and has a son named Jean Pierre Azize Mohamed Nazri.

In January 2021, Nazri was tested positive for COVID-19 and warded at the Hospital Raja Perempuan Zainab II in Kota Bharu, Kelantan.

== Election results ==
Parliament of Malaysia
Year	Constituency	Candidate	Votes	Pct	Opponent(s)	Votes	Pct	Ballots cast	Majority	Turnout
1995	P058 Chenderoh	Mohamed Nazri Abdul Aziz (UMNO)	16,983	76.59%	Saidin Mat Piah (S46)	5,190	23.41%	23,141	11,793	67.31%
1999	P058 Chenderoh	Mohamed Nazri Abdul Aziz (UMNO)	13,374	58.77%	Hamzah Mohd Zain (keADILan)	9,384	41.23%	23,397	3,990	64.77%
2004	P061 Padang Rengas	Mohamed Nazri Abdul Aziz (UMNO)	9,214	65.74%	Mohd Zolkafly Yahaya (PKR)	4,442	34.26%	18,132	5,563	72.93%
2008	P061 Padang Rengas	Mohamed Nazri Abdul Aziz (UMNO)	9,830	54.88%	Alias Zenon (PKR)	8,081	45.12%	18,350	1,749	75.21%
2013	P061 Padang Rengas	Mohamed Nazri Abdul Aziz (UMNO)	13,005	54.69%	Meor Ahmad Isharra Ishak (PKR)	10,775	45.31%	24,230	2,230	84.96%
2018	P061 Padang Rengas	Mohamed Nazri Abdul Aziz (UMNO)	10,491	41.50%	Ejazi Yahaya (PKR)	7,943	31.42%	25,698	2,548	82.91%
2018	P061 Padang Rengas	Mohamed Nazri Abdul Aziz (UMNO)	10,491	41.50%	Mohd Azalan Mohd Radzi (PAS)	6,847	27.08%	25,698	2,548	82.91%

== Honours ==
- Malacca
  - Companion Class I of the Exalted Order of Malacca (DMSM) – Datuk (1993)
- Perak
  - Knight Grand Commander of the Order of the Perak State Crown (SPMP) – Dato' Seri (2000)
- Pahang
  - Grand Knight of the Order of Sultan Ahmad Shah of Pahang (SSAP) – Dato' Sri (2008)
- Kelantan
  - Knight Commander of the Order of the Life of the Crown of Kelantan (DJMK) – Dato' (2011)
