= Padang Rengas (federal constituency) =

Federal constituency in Perak, Malaysia

Padang Rengas (P061)
Perak constituency

Federal constituency
- Legislature: Dewan Rakyat
- MP: Azahari Hasan; PN
- Constituency created: 1974
- First contested: 1974
- Last contested: 2022

Demographics
- Population (2020): 38,294
- Electors (2022): 38,686
- Area (km²): 395
- Pop. density (per km²): 96.9

Padang Rengas is a federal constituency in Kuala Kangsar District, Perak, Malaysia, that has been represented in the Dewan Rakyat since 1974.

The federal constituency was created in the 1974 redistribution and is mandated to return a single member to the Dewan Rakyat under the first past the post voting system.

== Demographics ==
Ethnic breakdown of Padang Rengas's electorate as of 2022
1. Malay (78.6%)
2. Chinese (14.8%)
3. Indian (6.50%)
4. Other ethnicities (0.10%)

As of 2020, Padang Rengas has a population of 38,294 people.

Age breakdown of Padang Rengas's electorate as of 2022
1. 18–20 (5.11%)
2. 21–29 (19.2%)
3. 30–39 (22.1%)
4. 40–49 (16.9%)
5. 50–59 (14.8%)
6. 60–69 (12.3%)
7. 70–79 (6.35%)
8. 80–89 (2.68%)
9. above 90 (0.56%)
Gender breakdown of Padang Rengas's electorate as of 2022
1. Male (49.5%)
2. Female (50.5%)

== History ==
It was abolished in 1986 when it was redistributed. It was re-created in 2003. Agriculture is the main economical activities in the area. Padang Rengas is surrounded by the small rubber estates creating job opportunity to the residents. Residents have a mix of Malays, Chinese, Indian and foreign workers. Liman Kati is the village with shops for business activities to help the rubber estate workers for daily supply and needs. Padang Rengas is well connected to the Royal Town Kuala Kangsar and capital of state Ipoh.

=== Polling districts ===
According to the federal gazette issued on 31 October 2022, the Padang Rengas constituency is divided into 31 polling districts.

State constituency	Polling Districts	Code	Location
Chenderoh (N19）	Jenalik	061/19/01	SK Jenalik
Chenderoh (N19）	Empangan Chenderoh	061/19/02	Dewan Kelab Kilat Chenderoh
Chenderoh (N19）	Sauk	061/19/03	SK Sauk
Chenderoh (N19）	Sauk Utara	061/19/04	SJK (C) Sauk
Chenderoh (N19）	Kampong Seterus	061/19/05	SJK (T) Ladang Kati
Chenderoh (N19）	Bendang Selinsing	061/19/06	SRA Rakyat Hidayah
Chenderoh (N19）	Chegar Galah	061/19/07	SK Chegar Galah
Chenderoh (N19）	Kampong Cheh	061/19/08	SK Cheh
Chenderoh (N19）	Kampong Chuar	061/19/09	SMK Temenggong
Chenderoh (N19）	Kati	061/19/10	SK Kati
Chenderoh (N19）	Berala	061/19/11	Al-Madrashah Al-Yasiniah Al-Islamiah Kampong Berala
Chenderoh (N19）	Lubok Chapin	061/19/12	SK Temong
Chenderoh (N19）	Changkat Jambu	061/19/13	SA Rakyat Nurul Liman
Chenderoh (N19）	Liman Kati	061/19/14	SJK (C) Liman
Chenderoh (N19）	Beluru	061/19/15	SK Beluru
Chenderoh (N19）	Kampong Jamuan	061/19/16	SMK Simpang Beluru
Chenderoh (N19）	Kota Lama Kiri	061/19/17	SK Padang Ampang
Lubok Merbau (N20)	Kampong Laneh	061/20/01	SK Laneh
Lubok Merbau (N20)	Kroh Hilir	061/20/02	SK Paya Salak
Lubok Merbau (N20)	Padang Rengas	061/20/03	SK Perempuan
Lubok Merbau (N20)	Padang Rengas Utara	061/20/04	SJK (C) Khiu Min
Lubok Merbau (N20)	Kampong Jaya	061/20/05	SK Tun Dr Ismail
Lubok Merbau (N20)	Kampong Buaya	061/20/06	Kolej Vokesional Kuala Kangsar
Lubok Merbau (N20)	Kampong Paya	061/20/07	SRA Rakyat Al-Musonifiah
Lubok Merbau (N20)	Kampong Lalang	061/20/08	SMA Ad-Diniah Al-Islamiah
Lubok Merbau (N20)	Padang Assam	061/20/09	SK Padang Assam
Lubok Merbau (N20)	Kampong Rambong	061/20/10	SK Syiekh Mohd. Idris Al-Marbawi
Lubok Merbau (N20)	Lubok Merbau	061/20/11	SK Syeikh Mohd. Idris Al-Marbawi
Lubok Merbau (N20)	Kampong Tanah Merah	061/20/12	SK Tanah Merah
Lubok Merbau (N20)	Kampong Station	061/20/13	SRA Rakyat An-Nur
Lubok Merbau (N20)	Kampong Basong	061/20/14	SK Clifford

=== Representation history ===
Members of Parliament for Padang Rengas
Parliament	No	Years	Member	Party
Constituency created from Kuala Kangsar and Ulu Perak
4th	P051	1974–1978	Abdul Aziz Yeop (عبدالعزيز ياياوڤ)	BN (UMNO)
5th	P051	1978–1982	Umar Ismail (عمر اسماعيل)	BN (UMNO)
6th	P051	1982–1986	Saidin Mat Piah (سعيدين مت ڤياه)	BN (UMNO)
Constituency abolished, split into Kuala Kangsar and Tasek Chenderoh
Constituency re-created from Chenderoh
11th	P061	2004–2008	Mohamed Nazri Abdul Aziz (محمد نظري عبدالعزيز)	BN (UMNO)
12th	P061	2008–2013	Mohamed Nazri Abdul Aziz (محمد نظري عبدالعزيز)	BN (UMNO)
13th	P061	2013–2018	Mohamed Nazri Abdul Aziz (محمد نظري عبدالعزيز)	BN (UMNO)
14th	P061	2018–2022	Mohamed Nazri Abdul Aziz (محمد نظري عبدالعزيز)	BN (UMNO)
15th	P061	2022–2026	Azahari Hasan (ازاهاري حسن)	PN (BERSATU)
15th	P061	2026	Azahari Hasan (ازاهاري حسن)	Independent
15th	P061	2026–present	Azahari Hasan (ازاهاري حسن)	PN (WAWASAN)

=== State constituency ===
Parliamentary constituency	State constituency						
Parliamentary constituency	1955–1959*	1959–1974	1974–1986	1986–1995	1995–2004	2004–2018	2018–present
Padang Rengas						Chenderoh	
Padang Rengas			Lenggong				
Padang Rengas			Lubok Merbau			Lubok Merbau	

=== Historical boundaries ===
State Constituency	Area		
State Constituency	1974	2003	2018
Chenderoh		Chenderoh; Kampung Bendang Selinsing; Kati; Kota Lama Kiri; Sauk	
Lenggong	Lenggong; Kampung Batu Ring; Kampung Beng; Kampung Ulu Chepur; Kampung Ulu Jepai		
Lubok Merbau	Lubok Merbau; Kampung Buaya; Kati; Kota Lama Kiri; Padang Rengas	Kampung Changkat Gohor; Kampung Kubang Panjang; Lubok Merbau; Padang Rengas; Taman Anggerik Biru	

=== Current state assembly members ===
No.	State Constituency	Member	Coalition (Party)
N19	Chenderoh	Syed Lukman Hakim Syed Mohd Zin	PN (BERSATU)
N20	Lubok Merbau	Azizi Mohamed Ridzuan	PN (PAS)

=== Local governments & postcode ===
No.	State Constituency	Local Government	Postcode
N19	Chenderoh	Kuala Kangsar Municipal Council	33000, 33010, 33020 Kuala Kangsar; 33500 Sauk; 33600 Enggor; 33700 Padang Rengas
N20	Lubok Merbau	Kuala Kangsar Municipal Council	33000, 33010, 33020 Kuala Kangsar; 33500 Sauk; 33600 Enggor; 33700 Padang Rengas

== Election results ==
Malaysian general election, 2022
Party	Candidate	Votes	%	∆%
PN	Azahari Hasan	12,931	43.28	▲43.28
BN	Mohd Arrif Abdul Majid	9,885	33.08	▼8.42
PH	Muhammad Kamil Abdul Munim	7,062	23.64	▲23.64
Total valid votes		29,878	100.00	
Total rejected ballots		370		
Unreturned ballots		68		
Turnout		30,316	77.23	▼5.68
Registered electors		38,686		
Majority		3,046	10.20	▲0.12
PN gain from BN		Swing		?
Source(s) https://lom.agc.gov.my/ilims/upload/portal/akta/outputp/1753277/PUB610%20PARLIMEN%20PERAK.pdf

Malaysian general election, 2018
Party	Candidate	Votes	%	∆%
BN	Mohamed Nazri Abdul Aziz	10,491	41.50	▼13.19
PKR	Ejazi Yahaya	7,943	31.42	▼13.89
PAS	Mohamad Azalan Mohamad Radzi	6,847	27.08	▲27.08
Total valid votes		25,281	100.00	
Total rejected ballots		315		
Unreturned ballots		102		
Turnout		25,698	82.91	▼2.05
Registered electors		30,996		
Majority		2,548	10.08	▲0.70
BN hold		Swing		
Source(s) "His Majesty's Government Gazette - Notice of Contested Election, Parliament for the State of Perak [P.U. (B) 237/2018]" (PDF). Attorney General's Chambers of Malaysia. 3 May 2018. "Federal Government Gazette - Results of Contested Election and Statements of the Poll after the Official Addition of Votes, Parliamentary Constituencies for the State of Perak [P.U. (B) 311/2018]" (PDF). Attorney General's Chambers of Malaysia. 28 May 2018.

Malaysian general election, 2013
Party	Candidate	Votes	%	∆%
BN	Mohamed Nazri Abdul Aziz	13,005	54.69	▼0.19
PKR	Meor Ahmad Isharra Ishak	10,775	45.31	▲0.19
Total valid votes		23,780	100.00	
Total rejected ballots		410		
Unreturned ballots		40		
Turnout		24,230	84.96	▲9.75
Registered electors		28,518		
Majority		2,230	9.38	▼0.38
BN hold		Swing		
Source(s) "Federal Government Gazette - Notice of Contested Election, Parliament for the State of Perak [P.U. (B) 174/2013]" (PDF). Attorney General's Chambers of Malaysia. 26 April 2013. Archived from the original (PDF) on 29 December 2019. "Federal Government Gazette - Results of Contested Election and Statements of the Poll after the Official Addition of Votes, Parliamentary Constituencies for the State of Perak [P.U. (B) 215/2013]" (PDF). Attorney General's Chambers of Malaysia. 22 May 2013.

Malaysian general election, 2008
Party	Candidate	Votes	%	∆%
BN	Mohamed Nazri Abdul Aziz	9,830	54.88	▼10.86
PKR	Alias Zenon	8,081	45.12	▲10.86
Total valid votes		17,911	100.00	
Total rejected ballots		362		
Unreturned ballots		77		
Turnout		18,350	75.21	▲2.28
Registered electors		24,397		
Majority		1,749	9.76	▼21.72
BN hold		Swing		

Malaysian general election, 2004
Party	Candidate	Votes	%	∆%
BN	Mohamed Nazri Abdul Aziz	11,615	65.74	
PKR	Mohd Zolkafly Yahaya	6,052	34.26	
Total valid votes		17,667	100.00	
Total rejected ballots		419		
Unreturned ballots		46		
Turnout		18,132	72.93	
Registered electors		24,862		
Majority		5,563	31.48	
BN hold		Swing		

Malaysian general election, 1982
Party	Candidate	Votes	%	∆%
BN	Saidin Mat Piah	12,885	68.07	▲2.10
PAS	Abdul Hafidz Osman	6,045	31.93	▼2.10
Total valid votes		18,930	100.00	
Total rejected ballots		754		
Unreturned ballots		0		
Turnout		19,684	73.91	▼3.38
Registered electors		26,631		
Majority		6,840	36.14	▲4.20
BN hold		Swing		

Malaysian general election, 1978
Party	Candidate	Votes	%	∆%
BN	Umar Ismail	11,839	65.97	▲65.97
PAS	Zabidin Alang Othman	6,108	34.03	▲34.03
Total valid votes		17,947	100.00	
Total rejected ballots		777		
Unreturned ballots		0		
Turnout		18,724	77.29	
Registered electors		24,227		
Majority		5,731	31.94	
BN hold		Swing		

Malaysian general election, 1974
Party	Candidate	Votes	%	∆%
On the nomination day, Abdul Aziz Yeop won uncontested.
BN	Abdul Aziz Yeop			
Total valid votes			100.00	
Total rejected ballots				
Unreturned ballots				
Turnout				
Registered electors		22,680		
Majority				
This was a new constituency created.
