= Batang Sadong =

Constituency of Sarawak, Malaysia

Batang Sadong (P200)
Sarawak constituency

Federal constituency
- Legislature: Dewan Rakyat
- MP: Rodiyah Shapiee; GPS
- Constituency created: 1987
- First contested: 1990
- Last contested: 2022

Demographics
- Population (2020): 33,694
- Electors (2022): 32,640
- Area (km²): 1,031
- Pop. density (per km²): 32.7

Batang Sadong is a federal constituency in Samarahan Division (Asajaya District, Simunjan District, Gedong District and Sebuyau District), Sarawak, Malaysia, that has been represented in the Dewan Rakyat since 1990.

The federal constituency was created in the 1987 redistribution and is mandated to return a single member to the Dewan Rakyat under a first-past-the-post voting system.

== Demographics ==
https://ge15.orientaldaily.com.my/seats/sarawak/p

Ethnic breakdown of Batang Sadong's electorate as of 2022
1. Malay-Muslim bumiputera (72.0%)
2. Sarawak bumiputera (22.6%)
3. Chinese (5.00%)
4. Other ethnicities (0.40%)

As of 2020, Batang Sadong has a population of 33,694 people.

Age breakdown of Batang Sadong's electorate as of 2022
1. 18-20 (6.67%)
2. 21-29 (19.7%)
3. 30-39 (20.5%)
4. 40-49 (16.5%)
5. 50-59 (16.7%)
6. 60-69 (11.8%)
7. 70-79 (6.01%)
8. 80-89 (1.62%)
9. above 90 (0.53%)
Gender breakdown of Batang Sadong's electorate as of 2022
1. Male (49.4%)
2. Female (50.6%)

== History ==
=== Polling districts ===
According to the gazette issued on 31 October 2022, the Batang Sadong constituency has a total of 30 polling districts.

| State constituency | Polling Districts | Code | Location |
|---|---|---|---|
| Sadong Jaya（N24） | Sepayor | 200/24/01 | SJK (C) Chung Hua Semera |
| Sadong Jaya（N24） | Semera | 200/24/02 | SK Haji Kelali Semera |
| Sadong Jaya（N24） | Jemukan | 200/24/03 | SK Jemukan |
| Sadong Jaya（N24） | Jemukan Ulu | 200/24/04 | SJK (C) Chung Hua Jemukan |
| Sadong Jaya（N24） | Sadong Jaya | 200/24/05 | SK Pendam |
| Sadong Jaya（N24） | Sadong Jaya Ulu | 200/24/06 | Dewan Masyarakat Kpg Sadong Jaya Ulu |
| Sadong Jaya（N24） | Jaie | 200/24/07 | SK Jaie |
| Sadong Jaya（N24） | Iboi | 200/24/08 | SK Iboi / Pelandok |
| Sadong Jaya（N24） | Pelandok | 200/24/09 | Dewan Masyarakat Kpg. Pelandok |
| Simunjan (N25) | Rangkang | 200/25/01 | Dewan Kpg. Rangkang |
| Simunjan (N25) | Putin | 200/25/02 | SK Haji Bujang Rangawan Putin |
| Simunjan (N25) | Rangawan | 200/25/03 | Dewan Kpg. Rangawan |
| Simunjan (N25) | Terasi | 200/25/04 | SK Terasi |
| Simunjan (N25) | Senageh | 200/25/05 | Dewan Kpg. Senageh |
| Simunjan (N25) | Sungai Buloh | 200/25/06 | SK Sg. Bulu / Senageh |
| Simunjan (N25) | Ensengei | 200/25/07 | SK Sebuyau / Ensengei |
| Simunjan (N25) | Simunjan | 200/25/08 | SJK (C) Chung Hua Simunjan; Perpustakaan Kpg. Sual; SMK Sri Sadong |
| Simunjan (N25) | Temiang | 200/25/09 | SK Sg. Lingkau; Dewan Kpg. Temiang; SK Lepong Emplas; SK Gunung Ngeli |
| Simunjan (N25) | Sageng | 200/25/10 | SK Sageng; SK Abang Man |
| Simunjan (N25) | Sekendu | 200/25/11 | SK Sekendu |
| Simunjan (N25) | Sungai Apin | 200/25/12 | SK Sg. Apin |
| Simunjan (N25) | Tanjong Beluku | 200/25/13 | Dewan Kpg. Tanjung Harapan |
| Simunjan (N25) | Slangking | 200/25/14 | SK Tanjung Pisang |
| Gedong (N26) | Kepayang | 200/26/01 | SK Kpg. Kepayang |
| Gedong (N26) | Engsengai | 200/26/02 | Dewan Pembangunan Insan Kpg. Engsengai Melayu Simunjan |
| Gedong (N26) | Sateman | 200/26/03 | Balai Raya Kpg. Sabang; Dewan Kpg. Sateman; SK Sg. Ba; Balai Raya Kpg. Samsu |
| Gedong (N26) | Pangkor | 200/26/04 | SK Lubok Punggor; SK Lubok Buntin; SK Kpg. Gumpey; Dewan Kampung Spaoh Gedong; Dewan Kpg. Benat Ulu |
| Gedong (N26) | Gedong | 200/26/05 | SK Abang Kadir Gedong |
| Gedong (N26) | Tegelam | 200/26/06 | SK Tegelam; Balai Raya Sg. Alit |
| Gedong (N26) | Keniong | 200/26/07 | RH Samau Ak Jelioh Munggu Air; SK Munghu Lalang; SK Kenoing; Dewan Isu Jaya; SK Semalatong |

=== Representation history ===
Members of Parliament for Batang Sadong
| Parliament | No | Years | Member | Party | Vote Share |
Constituency created from Simunjan, Samarahan and Serian
| 8th | P161 | 1990–1995 | Wahab Suhaili (وهاب سهيلي) | BN (PBB) | 8,887; 64.10% |
| 9th | P173 | 1995–1999 | Sukinam Domo (سوكينم دومو) | BN (PBB) | 9,700; 78.57% |
| 10th | P174 | 1999–2004 | Sukinam Domo (سوكينم دومو) | BN (PBB) | 7,656; 70.93% |
| 11th | P200 | 2004–2008 | Adenan Satem (عدنان صتيم) | BN (PBB) | 10,767; 91.23% |
| 12th | P200 | 2008–2013 | Nancy Shukri (ننسي شكري) | BN (PBB) | 8,183; 74.79% |
| 13th | P200 | 2013–2018 | Nancy Shukri (ننسي شكري) | BN (PBB) | 13,277; 86.81% |
| 14th | P200 | 2018 | Nancy Shukri (ننسي شكري) | BN (PBB) | 14,208; 83.25% |
| 14th | P200 | 2018–2022 | Nancy Shukri (ننسي شكري) | GPS (PBB) | 14,208; 83.25% |
| 15th | P200 | 2022–present | Rodiyah Sapiee (راضية شفيعي) | GPS (PBB) | 18,668; 83.18% |

=== State constituency ===
| Parliamentary constituency | State constituency | | | | | |
| Parliamentary constituency | 1969–1978 | 1978–1990 | 1990–1999 | 1999–2008 | 2008–2016 | 2016−present |
|---|---|---|---|---|---|---|
| Batang Sadong | | | | | | Gedong |
| Batang Sadong | | | | Sadong Jaya | | |
| Batang Sadong | | | Semera | | | |
| Batang Sadong | | | Simunjan | | | |

=== Historical boundaries ===
| State Constituency | Area | | | |
| State Constituency | 1987 | 1996 | 2005 | 2015 |
|---|---|---|---|---|
| Gedong | | | | Gedong; Kampung Engsengai; Kampung Gumpey; Kampung Sateman; Tengelam |
| Sadong Jaya | | Jemukan; Kampung Pelandok; Kampung Selangkin; Terasi; Semera | Jemukan; Kampung Pelandok; Kampung Sebuyau; Terasi; Semera | Jemukan; Kampung Iboi; Kampung Jaie; Kampung Pelandok; Semera |
| Semera | Jemukan; Kampung Pelandok; Kampung Sebuyau; Terasi; Semera | | | |
| Simunjan | Gedong; Kampung Jirok; Kampung Sedilo; Kampung Spaoh; Simiunjan | Gedong; Kampung Emplas; Kampung Engsengai; Simunjan; Tengelam | | Kampung Emplas; Kampung Sedilo; Kampung Selangking; Simunjan; Terasi |

=== Current state assembly members ===
| No. | State Constituency | Member | Coalition (Party) |
|---|---|---|---|
| N24 | Sadong Jaya | Aidel Lariwoo | GPS (PBB) |
| N25 | Simunjan | Awla Dris | GPS (PBB) |
| N26 | Gedong | Abang Abdul Rahman Zohari Abang Openg | GPS (PBB) |

=== Local governments & postcodes ===
| No. | State Constituency | Local Government | Postcode |
|---|---|---|---|
| N24 | Sadong Jaya | Kota Samarahan Municipal Council | 94600 Asajaya; 94800 Simunjan |
| N25 | Simunjan | Kota Samarahan Municipal Council (Terasi and Rangawan areas); Simunjan District Council | 94600 Asajaya; 94800 Simunjan |
| N26 | Gedong | Kota Samarahan Municipal Council (Ensengai and Sateman areas); Gedong District Council | 94600 Asajaya; 94800 Simunjan |

== Election results ==
Malaysian general election, 2022: Batang Sadong
| Party | Candidate | Votes | % | ∆% |
|---|---|---|---|---|
| GPS | Rodiyah Sapiee | 18,668 | 83.18 | ▲83.18 |
| PH | Lahaji Lahiya | 3,775 | 16.82 | ▲16.82 |
| Total valid votes | | 22,443 | 100.00 | |
| Total rejected ballots | | 379 | | |
| Unreturned ballots | | 102 | | |
| Turnout | | 22,924 | 70.23 | ▼4.51 |
| Registered electors | | 32,640 | | |
| Majority | | 14,893 | 66.36 | ▼5.88 |
| GPS gain from BN | | Swing | | ? |
Source(s) https://lom.agc.gov.my/ilims/upload/portal/akta/outputp/1753265/PARLIMEN%20SARAWAK%20(PUB%20620).pdf

Malaysian general election, 2018: Batang Sadong
| Party | Candidate | Votes | % | ∆% |
|---|---|---|---|---|
| BN | Nancy Shukri | 14,208 | 83.25 | ▼3.56 |
| PKR | Othman Mustapha @ Mos | 1,880 | 11.02 | ▲11.02 |
| PAS | Asan Singkro | 978 | 5.73 | ▼7.46 |
| Total valid votes | | 17,066 | 100.00 | |
| Total rejected ballots | | 220 | | |
| Unreturned ballots | | 63 | | |
| Turnout | | 17,349 | 74.74 | ▼3.60 |
| Registered electors | | 23,213 | | |
| Majority | | 12,328 | 72.24 | ▼1.38 |
| BN hold | | Swing | | |
Source(s) "His Majesty's Government Gazette – Notice of Contested Election, Parliament for the State of Sarawak [P.U. (B) 247/2018]" (PDF). Attorney General's Chambers of Malaysia. 3 May 2018. "Federal Government Gazette – Results of Contested Election and Statements of the Poll after the Official Addition of Votes, Parliamentary Constituencies for the State of Sarawak [P.U. (B) 321/2018]" (PDF). Attorney General's Chambers of Malaysia. 28 May 2018. Archived from the original (PDF) on 29 December 2019.

Malaysian general election, 2013: Batang Sadong
| Party | Candidate | Votes | % | ∆% |
|---|---|---|---|---|
| BN | Nancy Shukri | 13,277 | 86.81 | ▲12.02 |
| PAS | Mohamad Jolhi | 2,017 | 13.19 | ▲13.19 |
| Total valid votes | | 15,294 | 100.00 | |
| Total rejected ballots | | 227 | | |
| Unreturned ballots | | 20 | | |
| Turnout | | 15,541 | 78.34 | ▲12.13 |
| Registered electors | | 19,839 | | |
| Majority | | 11,260 | 73.62 | ▲24.04 |
| BN hold | | Swing | | |
Source(s) "Federal Government Gazette – Notice of Contested Election, Parliament for the State of Sarawak [P.U. (B) 184/2013]" (PDF). Attorney General's Chambers of Malaysia. 26 April 2013. Archived from the original (PDF) on 30 September 2018. "Federal Government Gazette – Results of Contested Election and Statements of the Poll after the Official Addition of Votes, Parliamentary Constituencies for the State of Sarawak [P.U. (B) 225/2013]" (PDF). Attorney General's Chambers of Malaysia. 22 May 2013. Archived from the original (PDF) on 30 September 2018.

Malaysian general election, 2008: Batang Sadong
| Party | Candidate | Votes | % | ∆% |
|---|---|---|---|---|
| BN | Nancy Shukri | 8,183 | 74.79 | ▼16.44 |
| PKR | Piee Ling | 2,758 | 25.21 | ▲25.21 |
| Total valid votes | | 10,941 | 100.00 | |
| Total rejected ballots | | 170 | | |
| Unreturned ballots | | 9 | | |
| Turnout | | 11,120 | 66.21 | ▲1.50 |
| Registered electors | | 16,794 | | |
| Majority | | 5,425 | 49.58 | ▼32.88 |
| BN hold | | Swing | | |

Malaysian general election, 2004: Batang Sadong
| Party | Candidate | Votes | % | ∆% |
|---|---|---|---|---|
| BN | Adenan Satem | 10,767 | 91.23 | ▲20.30 |
| PAS | Adam Ahid | 1,035 | 8.77 | ▼13.81 |
| Total valid votes | | 11,802 | 100.00 | |
| Total rejected ballots | | 167 | | |
| Unreturned ballots | | 0 | | |
| Turnout | | 11,969 | 64.71 | ▲3.77 |
| Registered electors | | 18,496 | | |
| Majority | | 9,732 | 82.46 | ▲34.11 |
| BN hold | | Swing | | |

Malaysian general election, 1999: Batang Sadong
| Party | Candidate | Votes | % | ∆% |
|---|---|---|---|---|
| BN | Sukinam Domo | 7,656 | 70.93 | ▼7.64 |
| PAS | Othman Mustapha | 2,438 | 22.58 | ▲22.58 |
| PKR | Sahari Pet | 701 | 6.49 | ▲6.49 |
| Total valid votes | | 10,795 | 100.00 | |
| Total rejected ballots | | 174 | | |
| Unreturned ballots | | 21 | | |
| Turnout | | 10,990 | 60.94 | ▼1.50 |
| Registered electors | | 18,034 | | |
| Majority | | 5,218 | 48.35 | ▼8.79 |
| BN hold | | Swing | | |

Malaysian general election, 1995: Batang Sadong
| Party | Candidate | Votes | % | ∆% |
|---|---|---|---|---|
| BN | Sukinam Domo | 9,700 | 78.57 | ▲14.47 |
| Independent | Shamsuddin Abdullah | 2,646 | 21.43 | ▲21.43 |
| Total valid votes | | 12,346 | 100.00 | |
| Total rejected ballots | | 346 | | |
| Unreturned ballots | | 491 | | |
| Turnout | | 13,183 | 62.44 | ▼12.63 |
| Registered electors | | 21,113 | | |
| Majority | | 7,054 | 57.14 | ▲27.08 |
| BN hold | | Swing | | |

Malaysian general election, 1990: Batang Sadong
| Party | Candidate | Votes | % |
|---|---|---|---|
| BN | Wahab Suhaili | 8,887 | 64.10 |
| PERMAS | Bujang Ulis | 4,719 | 34.04 |
| Independent | Pok Ungkut | 258 | 1.86 |
| Total valid votes | | 13,864 | 100.00 |
| Total rejected ballots | | 194 | |
| Unreturned ballots | | | |
| Turnout | | 14,058 | 75.07 |
| Registered electors | | 18,727 | |
| Majority | | 4,168 | 30.06 |
This was a new constituency created.
