= Azahari Hasan =

Malaysian politician and mariner

Yang Berhormat Captain (Rtd) Azahari Hasan MP
- أزهري حسن

Member of the Malaysian Parliament for Padang Rengas
- Incumbent
- Assumed office 19 November 2022
- Preceded by: Mohamed Nazri Abdul Aziz (BN–UMNO)
- Majority: 3,046 (2022)

Personal details
- Born: Azahari bin Hasan Sungai Petani, Kedah, Malaysia
- Party: Malaysian United Indigenous Party (BERSATU) (–2026); Independent (2026); Parti Wawasan Negara (WAWASAN) (2026–present)
- Other political affiliations: Perikatan Nasional (PN)(Until Now)
- Education: Malaysian Maritime Academy
- Occupation: Politician
- Profession: Mariner

Azahari bin Hasan is a Malaysian politician and mariner who has served as the Member of Parliament (MP) for Padang Rengas since November 2022. He is a member of Malaysian United Indigenous Party (BERSATU), a component party of the Perikatan Nasional (PN) coalition.

== Election results ==
Parliament of Malaysia
| Year | Constituency | Candidate | Votes | Pct | Opponent(s) | Votes | Pct | Ballots cast | Majority | Turnout |
|---|---|---|---|---|---|---|---|---|---|---|
| 2022 | P061 Padang Rengas | Azahari Hasan (BERSATU) | 12,931 | 43.28% | Mohd Arrif Abdul Majid (UMNO) | 9,885 | 33.08% | 30,316 | 3,046 | 77.23% |
| 2022 | P061 Padang Rengas | Azahari Hasan (BERSATU) | 12,931 | 43.28% | Muhammad Kamil Abdul Munim (PKR) | 7,062 | 23.64% | 30,316 | 3,046 | 77.23% |

== Honours ==
=== Honours of Malaysia ===
- Malaysia
  - Recipient of the 17th Yang di-Pertuan Agong Installation Medal

== See also ==
- Padang Rengas (federal constituency)
