= Rodiyah Sapiee =

Malaysian politician, engineer, lecturer and manager

Yang Berhormat Puan Rodiyah Sapiee PBS MP
- راضية شفيعي

Member of the Malaysian Parliament for Batang Sadong
- Incumbent
- Assumed office 19 November 2022
- Preceded by: Nancy Shukri (BN–PBB)
- Majority: 14,893 (2022)

Personal details
- Born: Rodiyah binti Sapiee; 14 March 1978 (age 48) Simunjan, Sarawak, Malaysia
- Party: Parti Pesaka Bumiputera Bersatu (PBB)
- Other political affiliations: Gabungan Parti Sarawak (GPS)
- Education: Universiti Malaysia Sarawak (BCE); Universiti Kebangsaan Malaysia (MBA)
- Occupation: Politician; manager
- Profession: Engineer; lecturer

Rodiyah binti Sapiee (born 4 November 1978) is a Malaysian politician, engineer, lecturer and manager who has served as the Member of Parliament (MP) for Batang Sadong since November 2022. She is a member of the Parti Pesaka Bumiputera Bersatu (PBB), a component party of the Gabungan Parti Sarawak (GPS) coalition.

Rodiyah started her career as a lecturer at the Sarawak Skills and Development Centre in 2000. She then worked as a civil engineer and project manager from 2001 to 2004. Before becoming an MP, she was also the manager of the Risk Management Unit at LCDA Holdings Sdn. Bhd.

== Election results ==
Parliament of Malaysia
Year	Constituency	Candidate	Votes	Pct	Opponent(s)	Votes	Pct	Ballots cast	Majority	Turnout
2022	P200 Batang Sadong	Rodiyah Sapiee (PBB)	18,668	83.18%	Lahaji Lahiya (AMANAH)	3,775	16.82%	22,924	14,893	70.23%

== Honours ==
=== Honours of Malaysia ===
- Malaysia
  - Recipient of the 17th Yang di-Pertuan Agong Installation Medal (2024)
- Sarawak
  - Officer of the Most Exalted Order of the Star of Sarawak (PBS) (2024)
  - Silver Medal of the Sarawak Independence Diamond Jubilee Medal (2024)

Parliament of Malaysia
Preceded by Nancy Shukri	Member of Parliament for Batang Sadong; 2022–present	Incumbent
