= Kamil Munim =

Malaysian politician

Yang Berusaha Tuan Kamil Munim
- كَامِل ٱلْمُنْعِم
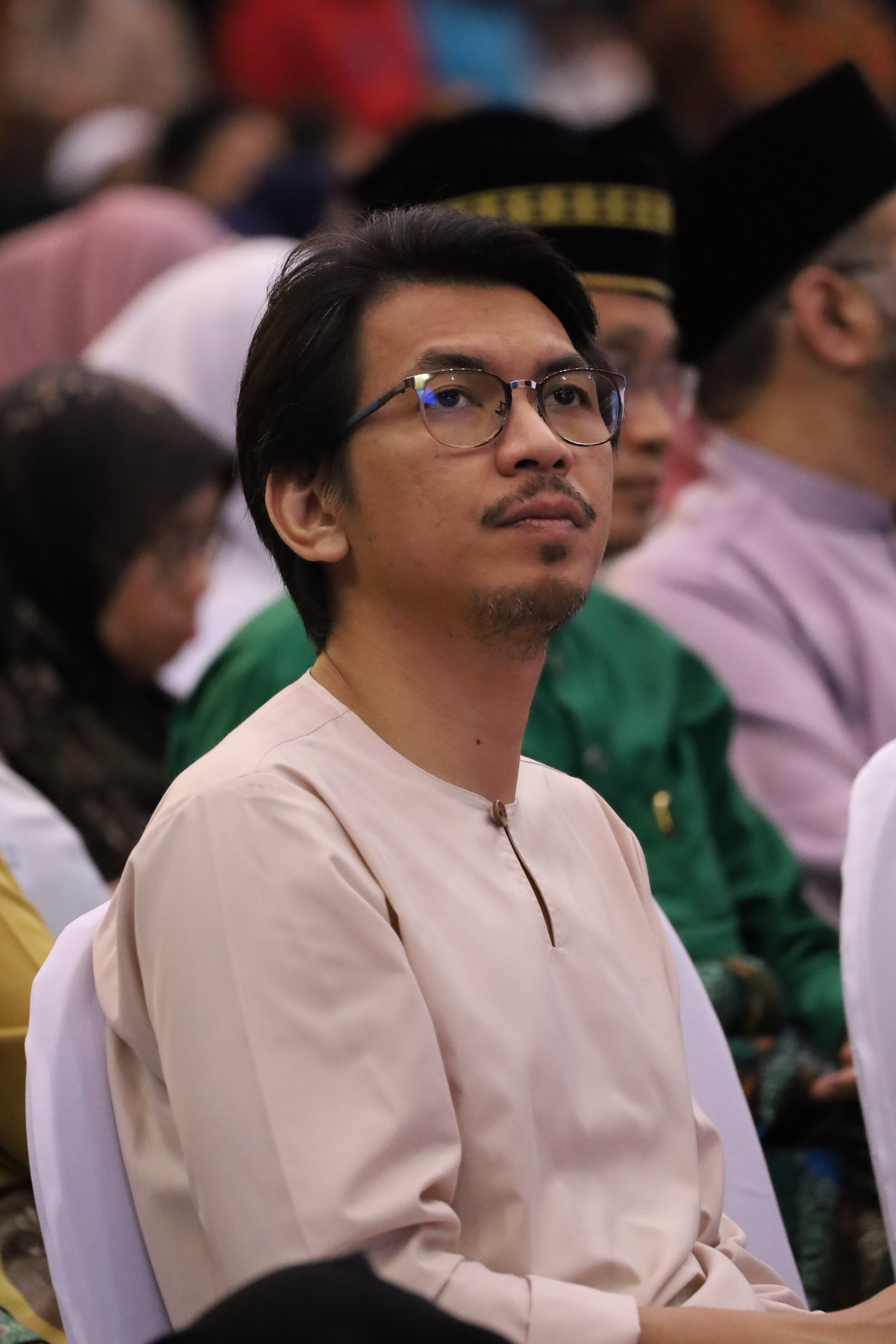
- Muhammad Kamil in 2025

Political Secretary to the Minister of Finance
- Incumbent
- Assumed office 27 January 2023
- Prime Minister: Anwar Ibrahim
- Minister: Anwar Ibrahim & Amir Hamzah Azizan (Finance Minister II)
- Preceded by: Rizam Ismail

Deputy Youth Chief of Pakatan Harapan
- Incumbent
- Assumed office TBD Serving with: Mohd Hasbie Muda &; Nurthaqaffah Nordin &; Felix Joseph Saang
- President: Wan Azizah Wan Ismail
- Chairman: Anwar Ibrahim
- Youth Chief: Woo Kah Leong
- Preceded by: Adam Adli Abd Halim

6th Youth Chief of the People's Justice Party
- Incumbent
- Assumed office 24 May 2025
- President: Anwar Ibrahim
- Deputy: Muhammad Izuan Ahmad Kasim
- Preceded by: Adam Adli Abd Halim

Personal details
- Born: Muhammad Kamil bin Abdul Munim; 29 April 1990 (age 36) Kuala Kangsar, Perak, Malaysia
- Citizenship: Malaysia
- Party: Malaysian Islamic Party (PAS) (until 2015); People's Justice Party (PKR) (since 2015)
- Other political affiliations: Pakatan Rakyat (PR) (until 2015); Pakatan Harapan (PH) (since 2015)
- Children: 4
- Parent(s): Abdul Munim Mohd Zain (father); Salasiah Mahiyudin (mother)
- Relatives: Mohd Zain Mohd Noh (grandfather)
- Education: International Islamic University Malaysia (LLB)
- Occupation: Politician
- Profession: Lawyer

Muhammad Kamil bin Abdul Munim (Jawi: محمّد كامل بن عبدالمنعم; born 29 April 1990) is a Malaysian politician and lawyer who has served as the Political Secretary to the Minister of Finance of Malaysia since January 2023. He is a member and the Division Chief of Padang Rengas of the People's Justice Party (PKR), a component party of the Pakatan Harapan (PH) coalition. He has served as the 6th Youth Chief of PKR following the 2025 party election.

== Early life and education ==
Muhammad Kamil was born on 29 April 1990 at Kuala Kangsar Hospital in Kuala Kangsar, Perak. He is the eleventh of twelve children born to Abdul Munim Mohd Zain and Salasiah Mahiyudin. His family comes from a notable political and religious background in the neighbouring Padang Rengas. His father, Abdul Munim, is a politician who twice contested the Lubok Merbau state seat for the Malaysian Islamic Party (PAS) during the 1995 and 1999 general elections. His paternal grandfather, Mohd Zain Mohd Noh, was co-founder of Maahad Al-Yahyawiyah, a local religious institution in Padang Rengas.

Kamil received his early education in his hometown, attending Raja Muda Musa Primary School (1997–2002) and Bukit Merchu Secondary School (2003–2007) in Kuala Kangsar. He continued with his pre-university studies at the Centre for Foundation Studies at the International Islamic University Malaysia (IIUM) in Gambang, Pahang from 2008 to 2009. He graduated in 2013 with a Bachelor of Laws (LLB) from the university's Ahmad Ibrahim Kulliyyah of Laws (AIKOL) at its main campus in Gombak, Selangor. During his university years, he was actively involved in student activism, being elected student representative for the AIKOL faculty seat and later appointed as Chairman of Academic and Intellectual Affairs within the student governing body.

== Legal career ==
Upon graduating from the International Islamic University Malaysia (IIUM), Muhammad Kamil began his career as a lawyer in 2014, becoming a legal partner at the law firm of K K Lim & Associates in Kota Damansara, Selangor. He was admitted to the Malaysian Bar on 3 July 2015.

== Political career ==
Muhammad Kamil belonged to a family that traditionally supported the Malaysian Islamic Party (PAS). However, they became politically estranged following the ouster of the party's moderate wing during the 2015 party election. Subsequently, Kamil entered politics the same year by joining the People's Justice Party (PKR), a component of the Pakatan Harapan coalition. He became involved in the party's youth wing, known as Angkatan Muda Keadilan (AMK). In 2018, he was appointed to the Executive Committee (EXCO) of AMK Perak at the state level. He later ran for a national leadership position in 2022, winning the election for Deputy Youth Chief of AMK Malaysia. He defeated Rawang assemblyman Chua Wei Kiat, a protégé of Deputy President Rafizi Ramli, by a narrow margin of 1,137 votes, securing 11,526 votes against Chua's 10,389.

Kamil proceeded to make his electoral debut in the 2022 general election, contesting the Padang Rengas constituency on the Pakatan Harapan ticket. He was defeated by the Perikatan Nasional (PN) candidate, Azahari Hasan, by a majority of 5,869 votes. Following the election, he was appointed as political secretary to the Minister of Finance on 23 January 2023, a role in which he continues to serve.

His upward political trajectory continued in the 2025 party election. At the branch level, he successfully contested the local leadership of his constituency, becoming Division Chief of PKR Padang Rengas. He defeated challenger Lukman Yahaya with a decisive tally of 532 votes to 85. At the national level, Kamil was elected unopposed as the Youth Chief (Ketua AMK) of PKR. This followed the decision of the Rafizi-aligned HIRUK faction against nominating a candidate for the position. Kamil, representing the DAMAI faction of Nurul Izzah Anwar, thus assumed leadership of the party's youth wing without a contest.

== Personal life ==
Muhammad Kamil is married and has four children.

== Election results ==
Parliament of Malaysia
Year	Constituency	Candidate	Votes	Pct	Opponent(s)	Votes	Pct	Ballots cast	Majority	Turnout
2022	P061 Padang Rengas	Muhammad Kamil Abdul Munim (PKR)	7,062	23.64%	Azahari Hasan (BERSATU)	12,931	43.28%	30,316	3,046	77.23%
2022	P061 Padang Rengas	Muhammad Kamil Abdul Munim (PKR)	7,062	23.64%	Mohd Arrif Abdul Majid (UMNO)	9,885	33.08%	30,316	3,046	77.23%

== See also ==
- List of International Islamic University Malaysia alumni
