= Next Terengganu state election =

General election for the 16th Terengganu State Legislative Assembly

- On or before 23 November 2028

32 of 36 seats in the Legislative Assembly 17 seats needed for a majority
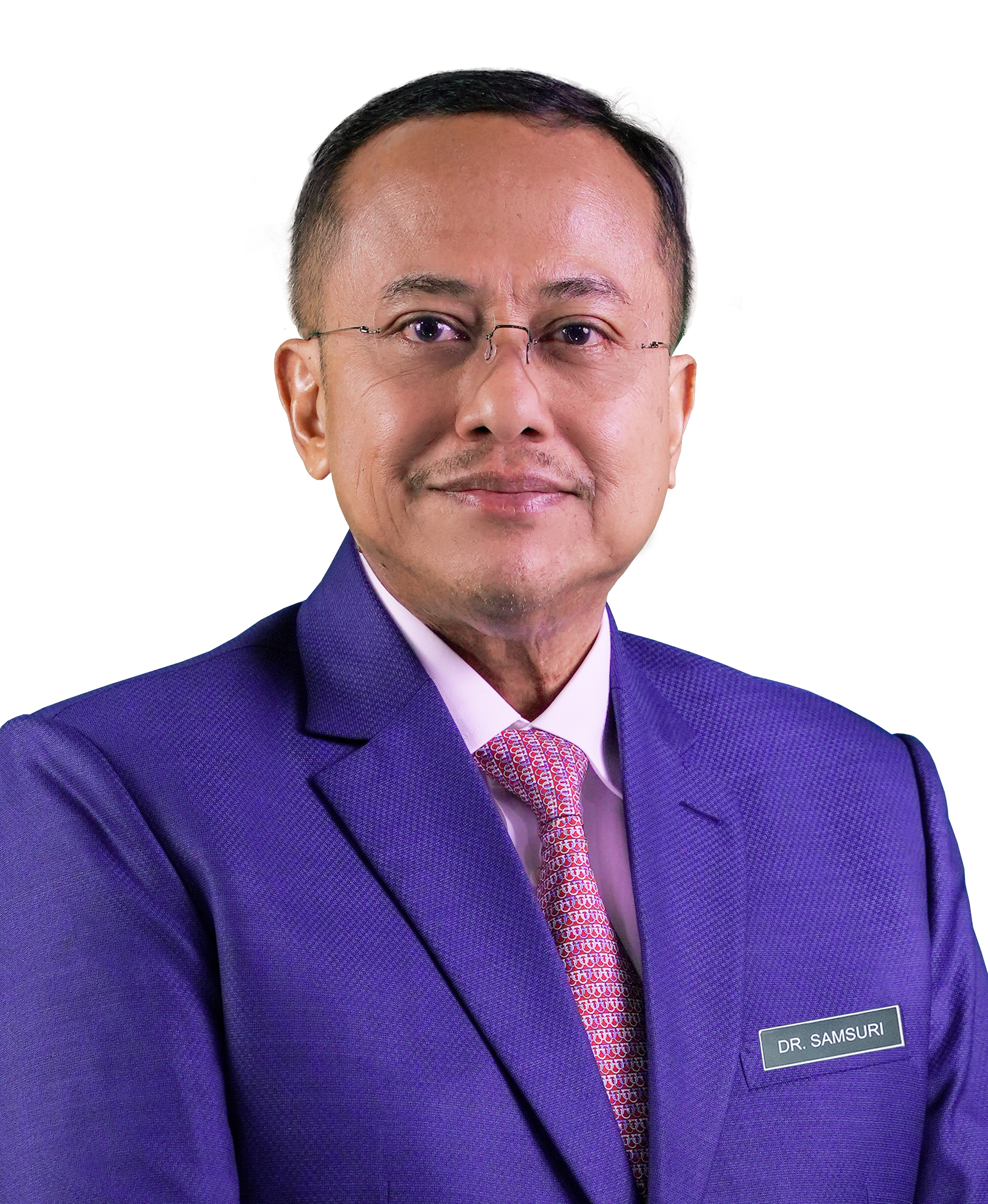
		BN	PH
Leader	Ahmad Samsuri Mokhtar	Rozi Mamat	Mohd Hasbie Muda
Party	PAS	UMNO	AMANAH
Alliance	PN	BN	PH
Leader since	10 May 2018	7 December 2023	23 November 2024
Leader's seat	Ru Rendang
Last election	32 seats, 68.48%	0 seats, 28.66%	0 seats, 2.78%
Current seats	32	0	0
Seats needed	Steady	▲17	▲17
Incumbent Menteri Besar
Ahmad Samsuri Mokhtar
PN-PAS

The next Terengganu state election, will elect members of the 16th Terengganu State Legislative Assembly. It must be held on or before 23 November 2028, pursuant to clause 44 (2) of the Constitution of Terengganu or unless dissolved earlier by the Sultan of Terengganu on the advice of the Menteri Besar of Terengganu.

All 32 seats in the Terengganu State Legislative Assembly will be contested. The election will determine whether the incumbent Perikatan Nasional government under Menteri Besar Ahmad Samsuri Mokhtar retains power, or whether opposition coalitions such as Barisan Nasional or Pakatan Harapan can secure a majority.

== Constituencies ==
Electoral map of Terengganu, showing all 32 constituencies

== Composition before dissolution ==
32
27	5
PAS	BERSATU

== Background ==
=== Previous election ===
The Perikatan Nasional (PN) coalition led by Parti Islam Se-Malaysia (PAS) won all 32 seats, recording the first clean sweep in the state's history since 1978. Other candidates, including the Barisan Nasional (BN) – Pakatan Harapan (PH) electoral pact did not win any seats, with BN losing all its previous 10 seats, leaving the state assembly with no elected opposition representative.

== Electoral system ==
Elections in Malaysia are conducted at the federal and state levels. Federal elections elect members of the Dewan Rakyat, the lower house of Parliament, while state elections in each of the 13 states elect members of their respective state legislative assembly. As Malaysia follows the Westminster system of government, the head of government (Prime Minister at the federal level and the Menteri Besar/Chief Ministers/Premier at the state level) is the person who commands the confidence of the majority of members in the respective legislature – this is normally the leader of the party or coalition with the majority of seats in the legislature.

The Legislative Assembly currently consists of 32 members, known as Members of the Legislative Assembly (MLAs), that are elected for five-year terms. Each MLA is elected from a single-member constituencies using the first-past-the-post voting system; each constituency contains approximately an equal number of voters. If one party obtains a majority of seats, then that party is entitled to form the government, with its leader becoming the Premier. In the event of a hung parliament, where no single party obtains the majority of seats, the government may still form through a coalition or a confidence and supply agreement with other parties. In practice, coalitions and alliances in Malaysia, and by extension, in Sarawak, generally persist between elections, and member parties do not normally contest for the same seats.

The voting age is currently 18. Elections are conducted by the Election Commission of Malaysia, which is under the jurisdiction of the Prime Minister's Department. Malaysia practices automatic voter registration but does not practice compulsory voting.

== Preparations ==
=== Political parties ===
Perikatan Nasional is expected to defend its governing mandate, while Barisan Nasional aims to regain influence after losing control in 2018. Pakatan Harapan may also expand its challenge in Malay-majority constituencies.

Seat negotiations among opposition parties are expected to play a major role in determining electoral competitiveness.

== Departing incumbents ==
The following members of the 15th Terengganu State Legislative Assembly did not seek re-election.

No.	State Constituency	Departing MLA	Coalition (Party)	Date confirmed	First elected	Reason

== Candidates ==
Candidate announcements are expected closer to nomination day.

No.	Parliamentary constituency	No.	State Constituency	Number of Voters	Constituency Largest Ethnic	Incumbent Member	Incumbent Coalition (Party)	Political coalitions and respective candidates and coalitions									
No.	Parliamentary constituency	No.	State Constituency	Number of Voters	Constituency Largest Ethnic	Incumbent Member	Incumbent Coalition (Party)	Perikatan Nasional (PN)		Barisan Nasional (BN)		Pakatan Harapan (PH)		Others			
No.	Parliamentary constituency	No.	State Constituency	Number of Voters	Constituency Largest Ethnic	Incumbent Member	Incumbent Coalition (Party)	Candidate name	Party	Candidate name	Party	Candidate name	Party	Candidate name	Party	Candidate name	Party
P33	Besut	N01	Kuala Besut		Malay	Azbi Salleh	PN (PAS)		PAS		UMNO		PKR				
P33	Besut	N02	Kota Putera		Malay	Mohd. Nurkhuzaini Ab. Rahman	PN (PAS)		PAS		UMNO		PKR				
P33	Besut	N03	Jertih		Malay	Riduan Md Nor	PN (PAS)		PAS		UMNO		AMANAH				
P33	Besut	N04	Hulu Besut		Malay	Mohd Husaimi Hussin	PN (BERSATU)		WAWASAN		UMNO		AMANAH				
P34	Setiu	N05	Jabi		Malay	Azman Ibrahim	PN (PAS)		PAS		UMNO		AMANAH				
P34	Setiu	N06	Permaisuri		Malay	Mohd Yusop Majid	PN (BERSATU)		WAWASAN		UMNO		PKR				
P34	Setiu	N07	Langkap		Malay	Azmi Maarof	PN (PAS)		PAS		UMNO		PKR				
P34	Setiu	N08	Batu Rakit		Malay	Mohd Shafizi Ismail	PN (PAS)		PAS		UMNO		AMANAH				
P35	Kuala Nerus	N09	Tepuh		Malay	Hishamuddin Abdul Karim	PN (PAS)		PAS		UMNO		AMANAH				
P35	Kuala Nerus	N10	Buluh Gading		Malay	Ridzuan Hashim	PN (PAS)		PAS		UMNO		AMANAH				
P35	Kuala Nerus	N11	Seberang Takir		Malay	Khazan Che Mat	PN (BERSATU)		WAWASAN		UMNO		PKR				
P35	Kuala Nerus	N12	Bukit Tunggal		Malay	Zaharudin Zahid	PN (PAS)		PAS		UMNO		PKR				
P36	Kuala Terengganu	N13	Wakaf Mempelam		Malay	Wan Sukairi Wan Abdullah	PN (PAS)		PAS		UMNO		PKR				
P36	Kuala Terengganu	N14	Bandar		Malay	Ahmad Shah Muhamed	PN (PAS)		PAS		UMNO		DAP				
P36	Kuala Terengganu	N15	Ladang		Malay	Zuraida Md Noor	PN (PAS)		PAS		UMNO		PKR				
P36	Kuala Terengganu	N16	Batu Buruk		Malay	Muhammad Khalil Abdul Hadi	PN (PAS)		PAS		UMNO		AMANAH				
P37	Marang	N17	Alur Limbat		Malay	Ariffin Deraman	PN (PAS)		PAS		UMNO		PKR				
P37	Marang	N18	Bukit Payung		Malay	Mohd Nor Hamzah	PN (PAS)		PAS		UMNO		AMANAH				
P37	Marang	N19	Ru Rendang		Malay	Ahmad Samsuri Mokhtar	PN (PAS)		PAS		UMNO		AMANAH				
P37	Marang	N20	Pengkalan Berangan		Malay	Sulaiman Sulong	PN (PAS)		PAS		UMNO		PKR				
P38	Hulu Terengganu	N21	Telemung		Malay	Mohd Zawawi Ismail	PN (BERSATU)		WAWASAN		UMNO		PKR				
P38	Hulu Terengganu	N22	Manir		Malay	Hilmi Harun	PN (PAS)		PAS		UMNO		PKR				
P38	Hulu Terengganu	N23	Kuala Berang		Malay	Mamad Puteh	PN (PAS)		PAS		UMNO		PKR				
P38	Hulu Terengganu	N24	Ajil		Malay	Maliaman Kassim	PN (PAS)		PAS		UMNO		AMANAH				
P39	Dungun	N25	Bukit Besi		Malay	Ghazali Sulaiman	PN (PAS)		PAS		UMNO		AMANAH				
P39	Dungun	N26	Rantau Abang		Malay	Mohd Fadhli Rahmi Zulkifli	PN (PAS)		PAS		UMNO		PKR				
P39	Dungun	N27	Sura		Malay	Tengku Muhammad Fakhruddin	PN (PAS)		PAS		UMNO		PKR				
P39	Dungun	N28	Paka		Malay	Satiful Bahri Mamat	PN (PAS)		PAS		UMNO		AMANAH				
P40	Kemaman	N29	Kemasik		Malay	Saiful Azmi Suhaili	PN (PAS)		PAS		UMNO		AMANAH				
P40	Kemaman	N30	Kijal		Malay	Razali Idris	PN (BERSATU)		WAWASAN		UMNO		AMANAH				
P40	Kemaman	N31	Cukai		Malay	Hanafiah Mat	PN (PAS)		PAS		UMNO		PKR				
P40	Kemaman	N32	Air Putih		Malay	Mohd Hafiz Adam	PN (PAS)		PAS		UMNO		PKR				

== Opinion polls ==
Opinion polling has yet to intensify significantly ahead of the election.
