= Menteri Besar of Terengganu =

State head of government in Malaysia

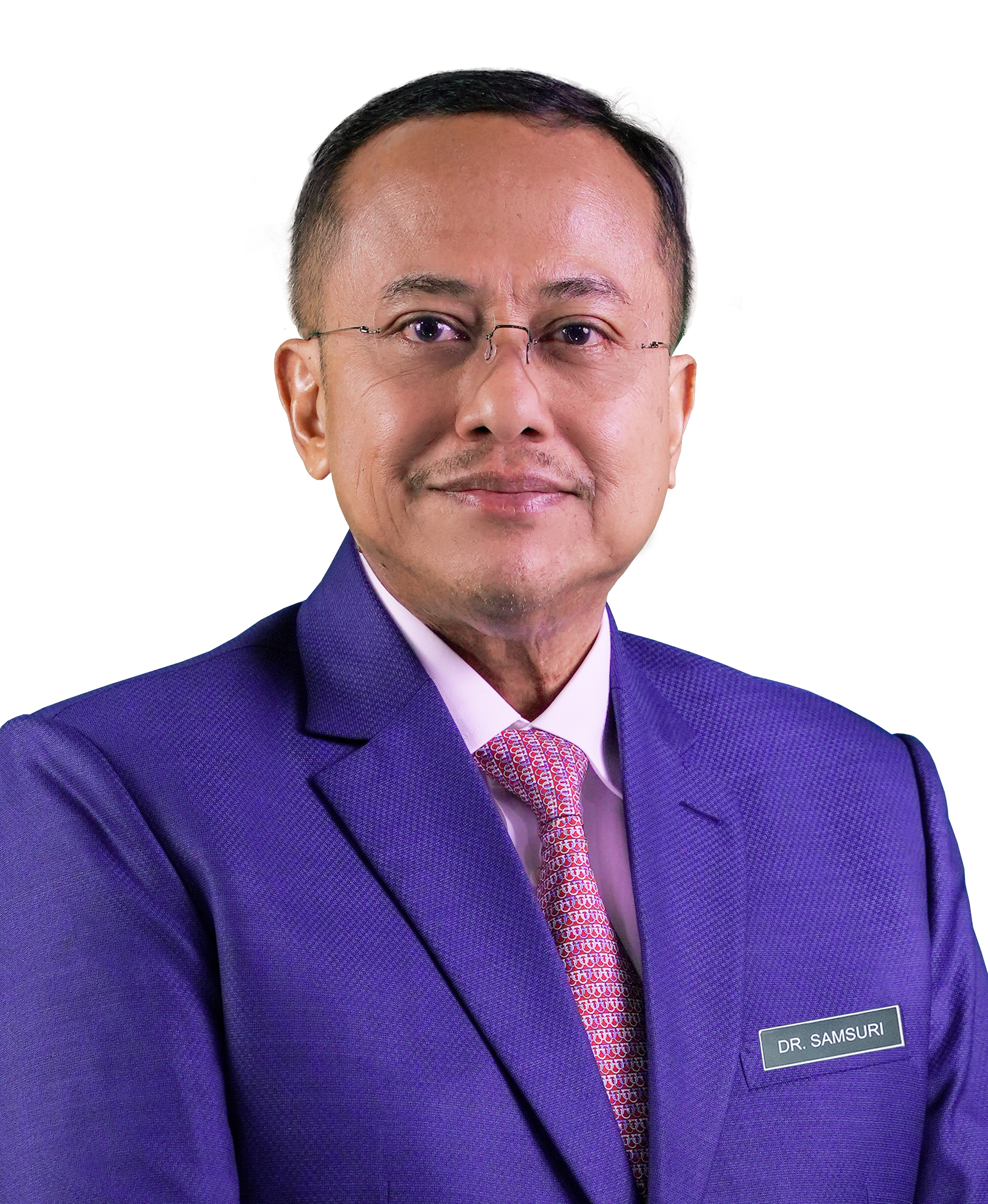
- Incumbent; Ahmad Samsuri Mokhtar since 10 May 2018
- Government of Terengganu
- Style: Yang Amat Berhormat (The Most Honourable)
- Member of: Terengganu State Executive Council
- Reports to: Terengganu State Legislative Assembly
- Residence: Jalan Batu Buruk, Kampung Batu Buruk, 20400 Kuala Terengganu, Terengganu
- Seat: Tingkat 16, Wisma Darul Iman, 20502 Kuala Terengganu, Terengganu
- Appointer: Mizan Zainal Abidin; Sultan of Terengganu
- Term length: 5 years or lesser, renewable once (while commanding the confidence of the Terengganu State Legislative Assembly With State Elections held no more than five years apart)
- Inaugural holder: Ngah Muhamad Yusof
- Formation: 21 April 1925; 101 years ago
- Deputy: Vacant
- Website: pmb.terengganu.gov.my

The Menteri Besar of Terengganu or First Minister of Terengganu is the head of government in the Malaysian state of Terengganu. According to convention, the Menteri Besar is the leader of the majority party or largest coalition party of the Terengganu State Legislative Assembly.

The 15th and current Menteri Besar of Terengganu is Ahmad Samsuri Mokhtar, who took office on 10 May 2018.

== Appointment ==
According to the state constitution, the Sultan of Terengganu shall first appoint the Menteri Besar to preside over the Executive Council and requires such Menteri Besar to be a member of the Legislative Assembly who in his judgment is likely to command the confidence of the majority of the members of the Assembly, must be an ethnic Malay who professes the religion of Islam, and must not be a Malaysian citizen by naturalisation or by registration. The Sultan on the Menteri Besar's advice shall appoint not more than ten nor less than four members from among the members of the Legislative Assembly.

The member of the Executive Council must take and subscribe in the presence of the Sultan the oath of office and allegiance as well as the oath of secrecy before they can exercise the functions of office. The Executive Council shall be collectively responsible to the Legislative Assembly. The members of the Executive Council shall not hold any office of profit and engage in any trade, business or profession that will cause a conflict of interest.

If a government cannot get its appropriation (budget) legislation passed by the Legislative Assembly, or the Legislative Assembly passes a vote of "no confidence" in the government, the Menteri Besar is bound by convention to resign immediately. The Sultan's choice of replacement Menteri Besar will be dictated by the circumstances. A member of the Executive Council other than the Menteri Besar shall hold office during the pleasure of the Sultan, unless the appointment of any member of the Executive Council shall have been revoked by the Sultan on the advice of the Menteri Besar, but may at any time resign his office.

Following a resignation in other circumstances, defeat in an election or the death of the Menteri Besar, the Sultan will generally appoint as Menteri Besar the person voted by the governing party as their new leader.

== Powers ==
The power of the Menteri Besar is subject to a number of limitations. A Menteri Besar removed as leader of his or her party, or whose government loses a vote of no confidence in the Legislative Assembly, must advise a state election or resign the office or be dismissed by the Sultan. The defeat of a supply bill (one that concerns the spending of money) or inability to pass important policy-related legislation is seen to require the resignation of the government or dissolution of Legislative Assembly, much like a non-confidence vote, since a government that cannot spend money is hamstrung, a condition called loss of supply.

The Menteri Besar's party will normally have a majority in the Legislative Assembly and party discipline is exceptionally strong in Terengganu politics, so passage of the government's legislation through the Legislative Assembly is mostly a formality.

== Caretaker Menteri Besar ==
The Legislative Assembly, unless sooner dissolved by the Sultan with His Majesty's own discretion on the advice of the Menteri Besar, shall continue for five years from the date of its first meeting. The state constitution permits a delay of 60 days from the date of dissolution for a general election to be held, and the legislative assembly shall be summoned to meet on a date not later than 120 days from the date of dissolution. Conventionally, between the dissolution of one legislative assembly and the convening of the next, the Menteri Besar and the Executive Council remain in office in a caretaker capacity.

== List of Menteris Besar of Terengganu ==
The following is the list of Menteris Besar of Terengganu since 1925:

Colour key (for political parties):
Independent Barisan Alternatif Alliance/BN PMIP/Gagasan Sejahtera PN

No.	Portrait	Name (Birth–Death) Constituency	Term of office			Party (Note: This column names only the Menteri Besar's party. The state government he heads may be a complex coalition of several parties and independents; those are not listed here.)	Election	Assembly
No.	Portrait	Name (Birth–Death) Constituency	Took office	Left office	Time in office	Party	Election	Assembly
1		Ngah Muhamad Yusof (1878–1940)	21 April 1925	28 June 1940	15 years, 69 days	Independent	–	–
2		Tengku Omar Othman (1884–1944)	15 July 1940	9 December 1941	1 year, 148 days	Independent	–	–
3		Da Omar Mahmud (1892–1953)	10 December 1941	16 December 1945	4 years, 7 days	Independent	–	–
4		Tengku Mohamad Sultan Ahmad (1899–1957)	17 December 1945	26 December 1949	4 years, 10 days	Independent	–	–
5		Kamaruddin Idris (1904–1993)	27 December 1949	June; 1959		Independent	–	–
6		Mohd Daud Abdul Samad; MLA for Setiu (1925–1983)	29 June 1959	8 November 1961	2 years, 133 days	PMIP	1959	1st
7		Ibrahim Fikri Mohammad; MLA for Kuala Nerus (died 1973)	9 November 1961	3 September 1969	7 years, 299 days	Alliance (UMNO)	–	1st
7		Ibrahim Fikri Mohammad; MLA for Kuala Nerus (died 1973)	9 November 1961	3 September 1969	7 years, 299 days	Alliance (UMNO)	1964	2nd
7		Ibrahim Fikri Mohammad; MLA for Kuala Nerus (died 1973)	9 November 1961	3 September 1969	7 years, 299 days	Alliance (UMNO)	1969	3rd
8		Mahmood Sulaiman (born 1929); MLA for Ulu Trengganu Barat	1 October 1969	3 September 1972	2 years, 339 days	Alliance (UMNO)	–	3rd
9		Nik Hassan Wan Abdul Rahman (born 1927); MLA for Batu Rakit	4 September 1972	2 August 1974	1 year, 333 days	Alliance (UMNO)	–	3rd
9		Nik Hassan Wan Abdul Rahman (born 1927); MLA for Batu Rakit	4 September 1972	2 August 1974	1 year, 333 days	BN (UMNO)	–	3rd
10		Tan Sri Dato' Seri; Wan Mokhtar Ahmad (1932–2020); MLA for Cukai	1 September 1974	2 December 1999	25 years, 93 days	BN (UMNO)	1974	4th
10		Tan Sri Dato' Seri; Wan Mokhtar Ahmad (1932–2020); MLA for Cukai	1 September 1974	2 December 1999	25 years, 93 days	BN (UMNO)	1978	5th
10		Tan Sri Dato' Seri; Wan Mokhtar Ahmad (1932–2020); MLA for Cukai	1 September 1974	2 December 1999	25 years, 93 days	BN (UMNO)	1982	6th
10		Tan Sri Dato' Seri; Wan Mokhtar Ahmad (1932–2020); MLA for Cukai	1 September 1974	2 December 1999	25 years, 93 days	BN (UMNO)	1986	7th
10		Tan Sri Dato' Seri; Wan Mokhtar Ahmad (1932–2020); MLA for Cukai	1 September 1974	2 December 1999	25 years, 93 days	BN (UMNO)	1990	8th
10		Tan Sri Dato' Seri; Wan Mokhtar Ahmad (1932–2020); MLA for Cukai	1 September 1974	2 December 1999	25 years, 93 days	BN (UMNO)	1995	9th
11		Tan Sri Dato' Seri; Abdul Hadi Awang (born 1947); MLA for Ru Rendang	2 December 1999	25 March 2004	4 years, 115 days	BA (PAS)	1999	10th
12		Tan Sri Dato' Seri; Idris Jusoh (born 1955); MLA for Jertih	25 March 2004	25 March 2008	4 years, 0 days	BN (UMNO)	2004	11th
13		Dato' Seri; Ahmad Said (born 1957); MLA for Kijal	25 March 2008	12 May 2014	6 years, 49 days	BN (UMNO)	2008	12th
13		Dato' Seri; Ahmad Said (born 1957); MLA for Kijal	25 March 2008	12 May 2014	6 years, 49 days	BN (UMNO)	2013	13th
14		Dato' Seri; Ahmad Razif Abdul Rahman (born 1965); MLA for Seberang Takir	13 May 2014	10 May 2018	3 years, 363 days	BN (UMNO)	–	13th
15		Dato' Seri; Ahmad Samsuri Mokhtar (born 1970); MLA for Ru Rendang	10 May 2018	Incumbent	8 years, 146 days	GS (PAS)	2018	14th
15		Dato' Seri; Ahmad Samsuri Mokhtar (born 1970); MLA for Ru Rendang	10 May 2018	Incumbent	8 years, 146 days	PN (PAS)	2018	14th
15		Dato' Seri; Ahmad Samsuri Mokhtar (born 1970); MLA for Ru Rendang	10 May 2018	Incumbent	8 years, 146 days	PN (PAS)	2023	15th
