= Ahmad Said (politician) =

Malaysian politician

Yang Berbahagia Dato' Seri Ahmad Said SSMZ DPMT ASM PJK
- أحمد سعيد

13th Menteri Besar of Terengganu
- In office 25 March 2008 – 12 May 2014
- Monarch: Mizan Zainal Abidin
- Preceded by: Idris Jusoh
- Succeeded by: Ahmad Razif Abdul Rahman
- Constituency: Kijal

State Leader of the Opposition of Terengganu
- In office 21 March 2019 – 12 August 2023
- Monarch: Mizan Zainal Abidin
- Menteri Besar: Ahmad Samsuri Mokhtar
- Preceded by: Ahmad Razif Abdul Rahman
- Succeeded by: Vacant
- Constituency: Kijal

Member of the Terengganu State Legislative Assembly for Kijal
- In office 21 March 2004 – 12 August 2023
- Preceded by: Mehamed Sulong (PAS)
- Succeeded by: Razali Idris (PN–BERSATU)
- Majority: 3,496 (2004); 3,157 (2008); 4,204 (2013); 1,265 (2018); 3,758 (2023)
- In office 21 October 1990 – 29 November 1999
- Preceded by: Mohamad Mat Amin (BN–UMNO)
- Succeeded by: Mehamed Sulong (PAS)
- Majority: 1,834 (1990); 1,290 (1995)

Member of the Terengganu State Executive Council
- 1995–1999: Chairman of the Housing and Local Government
- 2004–2008: Chairman of the Housing and Local Government

Personal details
- Born: Ahmad bin Said; 15 February 1957 (age 69) Teluk Kalong, Kemaman, Terengganu, Federation of Malaya (now Malaysia)
- Party: United Malays National Organisation (UMNO)
- Other political affiliations: Barisan Nasional (BN)
- Spouse: Norliza Mahmud
- Children: 8
- Education: Universiti Sains Malaysia

Ahmad bin Said (born 15 February 1957) is a Malaysian politician who served as the 13th Menteri Besar of Terengganu from March 2008 to May 2013, Leader of the Opposition of Terengganu from March 2019 to August 2023, Member of the Terengganu State Legislative Assembly (MLA) for Kijal from October 1990 to November 1999 and again from March 2004 to August 2023 and Member of the Terengganu State Executive Council (EXCO) from 1995 to his promotion to the Menteri Besarship in March 2008. He is a member and Division Chief of Kemaman of the United Malays National Organisation (UMNO), a component party of the Barisan Nasional (BN) coalition. Concurrently, he is the State Chairman of Terengganu BN and UMNO.

== Profile ==
Ahmad Said is a political science graduate from Universiti Sains Malaysia and was firstly elected as an assemblyman in 1990, at the young age of only 33 years old, succeeding Mohamad Md Amin, who died during the campaigning period. He has eight children as a result of his polygamous marriage with two women and each of his two wives live one kilometer apart from his own residence.

== Menteri Besar of Terengganu ==
Following the 2008 Malaysian general election, Barisan Nasional won a majority in the Terengganu state election with 24 out of 32 state seats, with the Malaysian Islamic Party (PAS) winning the remaining eight seats.

In the formation of the new Terengganu state government, the federal government under the then-Prime Minister Abdullah Ahmad Badawi put forth the reappointment of Datuk Seri Idris Jusoh to a second term as Menteri Besar. Abdullah claimed Idris received full support of 23 of the 24 Barisan Nasional state assemblymen elected.

In what political analysts described as a possible constitutional crisis, trouble began to precipitate after the Sultan of Terengganu, Tuanku Mizan Zainal Abidin, who was also the then-Yang di-Pertuan Agong (King) of Malaysia, refused to re-appoint and swear in Idris as Menteri Besar. Similar problems occurred in the state of Perlis where the PM's choice was also rejected and eventually the PM had to give in to the Raja of Perlis.

On 22 March 2008, the office of the Sultan of Terengganu announced the appointment of the Kijal assemblyman Ahmad Said instead of Idris Jusoh.

The prime minister responded by saying that the appointment of Ahmad Said was "unconstitutional" as it went against the wishes of the assemblymen and the prime Minister's office who have supported Idris Jusoh's candidacy for Menteri Besar. The 22 other assemblymen had also pledged their support toward the appointment of Idris Jusoh according to the then deputy prime minister Najib Tun Razak.

In spite of threats to strip Ahmad Said of his UMNO membership "for disobeying the leadership", he went to the office in Wisma Darul Iman to begin the first day of his new appointment on 25 March 2008. Ahmad Said was subsequently stripped of his UMNO membership. This technically disqualified him from representing the state UMNO and therefore commanding the majority in the legislative assembly to be appointed as Menteri Besar in the first place.

The ruling party also planned to vote down the Sultan's choice through a motion of no-confidence by 22 UMNO state assemblymen. The opposition party Parti Islam SeMalaysia in the meantime promised that its assemblymen would support Ahmad Said as Menteri Besar.

On 26 March 2008, Prime Minister Abdullah Ahmad Badawi and Sultan Mizan Zainal Abidin met at Istana Negara to resolve the impasse. The Prime Minister reversed his stance and decided to accept the king's appointment of Ahmad Said as Menteri Besar of Terengganu. He also apologised to the king for the public spat over the appointment of the Menteri Besar, explaining that there was no intention to disparage or humiliate the royal household. The apparent backdown was due to a threat that the royal household would be prepared to dissolve the state assembly if the motion of no-confidence was initiated against Ahmad Said, which would trigger another election in what was already a climate of discontent towards the ruling party and the possibility of dissenting assemblymen defecting to the opposition.

The UMNO Supreme Council proceeded to endorse Ahmad Said as the new Menteri Besar of Terengganu. With the resolution of the impasse, Ahmad Said expressed his gratitude over his appointment and paid tribute to Idris an old friend he has known since their university days, for the contributions that he has done for the Terengganu people so far and to seek his advice. After the swearing-in ceremony, he also expressed hope in moving on to discharge his responsibility to the people and eradicate poverty within the state.

He resigned as Menteri Besar on 12 May 2013, making way for Ahmad Razif Abdul Rahman, the Seberang Takir Assemblyman to take over his position. This was made as an agreement with the Prime Minister, Najib Razak that he would step down during second term in order to give way to a younger politician or a capable leader. He, however, did not step down without another controversy (or crisis during his appointment). He and Ajil Assemblyman, Ghazali Taib followed by Bukit Besi Assemblyman, Roslee Daud, left UMNO, the ruling party in Terengganu and caused the state to have a minority ruling government Barisan Nasional (14 state assemblymen) and a majority opposition Pakatan Rakyat (15 state assemblymen) with three independent assemblymen for the first time in Malaysia's history. This is because he felt slighted when Najib Razak rejected his proposal to resign after his daughter's wedding reception. However, all three then revoked their decision and returned to UMNO. He later pledged to give his full support to the new MB. He then too attempted a no-confidence motion against his successor during a 2015 Terengganu state assembly meeting but failed.

== Post-GE 14 ==
He remained in the Kijal state seat at the 14th general election and won against PAS and PH candidates with a majority of 1265 votes. He won the Kemaman UMNO division chief in the 2018 party elections but lost in his UMNO vice-presidency. He was re-appointed Terengganu UMNO liaison chairman to replace Datuk Seri Mahdzir Khalid on 11 January 2019. He lost his seat in 2023 Terengganu state election by a majority of 3758 votes to Razali Idris after retaining it since 1990.

== Election results ==
Terengganu State Legislative Assembly
Year	Constituency	Candidate	Votes	Pct	Opponent(s)	Votes	Pct	Ballots cast	Majority	Turnout
1990	N30 Kijal	Ahmad Said (UMNO)								
1990	N30 Kijal	Ahmad Said (UMNO)								
1995	N30 Kijal	Ahmad Said (UMNO)	4,433	58.19%	Awang Omar (PAS)	3,143	41.26%	7,792	1,290	83.78%
1995	N30 Kijal	Ahmad Said (UMNO)	4,433	58.19%	Jamalis Awang (IND)	42	0.55%	7,792	1,290	83.78%
1999	N30 Kijal	Ahmad Said (UMNO)	4,161	48.46%	Mohamad Sulong (PAS)	4,425	51.54%	8,784	264	84.11%
2004	N30 Kijal	Ahmad Said (UMNO)	7,987	64.01%	Mohamad Sulong (PAS)	4,491	35.99%	12,620	3,496	89.11%
2008	N30 Kijal	Ahmad Said (UMNO)	8,169	61.98%	Hazri Jusoh (PAS)	5,012	38.02%	13,386	3,157	85.98%
2013	N30 Kijal	Ahmad Said (UMNO)	10,574	62.41%	Hazri Jusoh (PAS)	6,370	37.59%	17,137	4,204	87.01%
2018	N30 Kijal	Ahmad Said (UMNO)	9,545	49.46%	Hazri Jusoh (PAS)	8,280	42.91%	19,652	1,265	87.03%
2018	N30 Kijal	Ahmad Said (UMNO)	9,545	49.46%	Wan Marzuki Wan Sembok (BERSATU)	1,472	7.63%	19,652	1,265	87.03%
2023	N30 Kijal	Ahmad Said (UMNO)	9,645	41.85%	Razali Idris (BERSATU)	13,403	58.15%	23,048	3,758	78.15%

Parliament of Malaysia
Year	Constituency	Candidate	Votes	Pct	Opponent(s)	Votes	Pct	Ballots cast	Majority	Turnout
2022	P040 Kemaman	Ahmad Said (UMNO)	38,535	34.07%	Che Alias Hamid (PAS)	65,714	58.11%	114,553	27,179	81.12%
2022	P040 Kemaman	Ahmad Said (UMNO)	38,535	34.07%	Hasuni Sudin (PKR)	8,340	7.37%	114,553	27,179	81.12%
2022	P040 Kemaman	Ahmad Said (UMNO)	38,535	34.07%	Rosli Abd Ghani (PEJUANG)	506	0.45%	114,553	27,179	81.12%

== Honours ==
- Terengganu
  - Knight Grand Companion of the Order of Sultan Mizan Zainal Abidin of Terengganu (SSMZ) – Dato' Seri (2009)
  - Knight Commander of the Order of the Crown of Terengganu (DPMT) – Dato' (2004)
  - Member of the Order of Sultan Mahmud I of Terengganu (ASM)
  - Recipient of the Meritorious Service Medal (PJK)
