= Ahmad Razif Abdul Rahman =

Malaysian politician

Yang Berbahagia Dato' Seri Dr. Ahmad Razif Abdul Rahman SSMZ SMZ
- أحمد رزيف عبدالرحمٰن
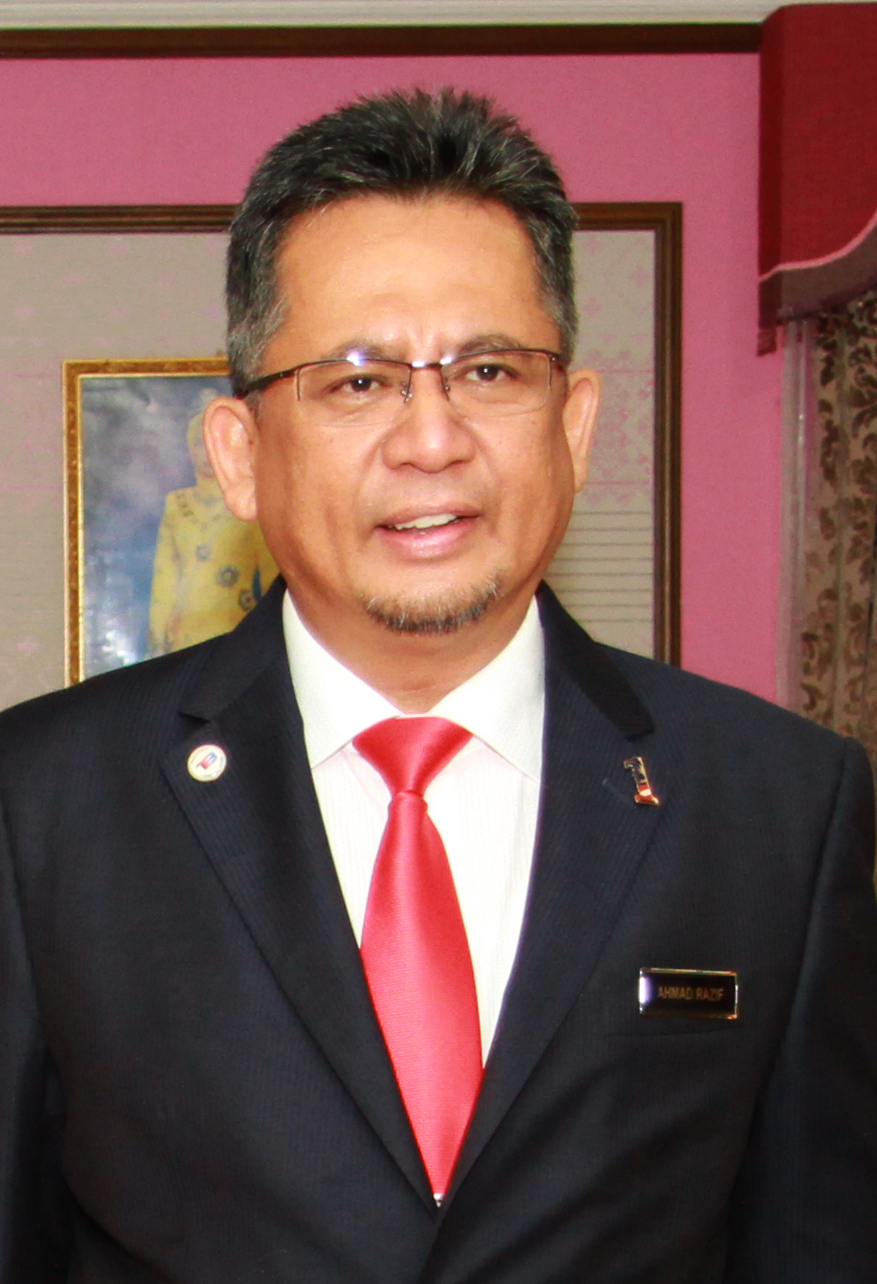
- Ahmad Razif in 2017

14th Menteri Besar of Terengganu
- In office 13 May 2014 – 10 May 2018
- Monarch: Mizan Zainal Abidin
- Preceded by: Ahmad Said
- Succeeded by: Ahmad Samsuri Mokhtar
- Constituency: Seberang Takir

State Leader of the Opposition of Terengganu
- In office 1 July 2018 – 4 February 2019
- Monarch: Mizan Zainal Abidin
- Menteri Besar: Ahmad Samsuri Mokhtar
- Succeeded by: Ahmad Said
- Constituency: Seberang Takir

Member of the Terengganu State Executive Council (Education, Higher Education, Science, Technology and Human Resources: 9 April 2008–10 May 2013) (Science, Technology, Environment, Green Technology and Water: 11 May 2013–20 July 2016)
- In office 9 April 2008 – 20 July 2016
- Monarch: Mizan Zainal Abidin
- Deputy: Mohd Zawawi Ismail (2008–2013)
- Menteri Besar: Ahmad Said (2008–2013); Himself (2013–2016)
- Preceded by: Abdul Latiff Awang
- Succeeded by: Abdul Latiff Awang (Science and Technology); Rosli Othman (Environment, Green Technology and Water)
- Constituency: Seberang Takir

Member of the Terengganu State Legislative Assembly for Seberang Takir
- In office 8 March 2008 – 12 August 2023
- Preceded by: Mohd Shapian Ali (BN–UMNO)
- Succeeded by: Khazan Che Mat (PN–BERSATU)
- Majority: 2,430 (2008); 1,510 (2013); 1,884 (2018)

Personal details
- Born: Ahmad Razif bin Abdul Rahman; 7 November 1965 (age 60) Seberang Takir, Kuala Nerus (then located in undivided Kuala Terengganu), Terengganu, Malaysia
- Citizenship: Malaysian
- Party: United Malays National Organisation (UMNO)
- Other political affiliations: Barisan Nasional (BN)
- Spouse: Halina Zakaria
- Education: Universiti Putra Malaysia; Universiti Sains Malaysia

Ahmad Razif bin Abdul Rahman (born 7 November 1965) is a Malaysian politician who served as the 14th Menteri Besar of Terengganu from May 2014 to May 2018, Member of the Terengganu State Executive Council (EXCO) in the Barisan Nasional (BN) state administration under former Menteri Besars Ahmad Said and himself from April 2008 to July 2016, State Leader of the Opposition of Terengganu from July 2018 to his resignation in February 2019 as well as Member of the Terengganu State Legislative Assembly (MLA) for Seberang Takir from March 2008 to August 2023. He is a member and the Division Chief of Kuala Nerus of the United Malays National Organisation (UMNO), a component party of the BN coalition.

== Profile ==
Ahmad Razif, the son of a religious teacher, was raised in Terengganu. He graduated from Universiti Putra Malaysia with a Masters in Science and rose through the ranks of his local UMNO division.

== Political career ==
In 2008, he was elected to the Terengganu State Legislative Assembly for the seat of Seberang Takir, defeating a People's Justice Party (PKR) candidate. The State's incoming Chief Minister Ahmad Said appointed him to the State's Executive Council—akin to a cabinet—with responsibility for education, higher education, science, technology and human resources.

Ahmad Razif retained his assembly seat at the 2013 election. However, the Barisan Nasional state government almost lost its majority in the assembly, clinging to power with a slim 17–15 majority. In response, the coalition's national leader, and the Prime Minister, Najib Razak, pressured Ahmad Said to resign within a year. On 12 May 2013, Ahmad Said stood down and Ahmad Razif was appointed as his successor. He was sworn into office by Mizan Zainal Abidin, the Sultan of Terengganu, on 13 May.

Ahmad Razif's first task as Chief Minister was to navigate a political crisis when Ahmad Said and two other UMNO assemblymen resigned from UMNO immediately after his appointment, potentially plunging his government into minority status. Ahmad Said stated that he was dissatisfied that he had not been allowed to remain as Chief Minister until after the wedding of his daughter in May 2014. The three assemblymen returned to the party within days, after the intervention of Najib and other senior Barisan Nasional leaders. On 22 April 2016, his 'Datuk Seri' title had been revoked by the Sultan. On 9 December 2016, the Sultan has consented to restore 'Datuk Seri' title to him. He lost his Menteri Besar of Terengganu position after the defeat of Barisan Nasional in the 2018 Terengganu state election and became the opposition leader before resigning in March 2019.In 2023 Terengganu state election, he lost his Seberang Takir (state constituency) with the majority of 2797 votes after holding the seat for three terms.

== Election results ==
Terengganu State Legislative Assembly
Year	Constituency	Candidate	Votes	Pct	Opponent(s)	Votes	Pct	Ballots cast	Majority	Turnout
2008	N11 Seberang Takir	Ahmad Razif Abdul Rahman (UMNO)	6,440	61.24%	Muzafeq Assyulzaifuzan Mamat (PKR)	4,010	38.13%	10,718	2,430	84.06%
2013	N11 Seberang Takir	Ahmad Razif Abdul Rahman (UMNO)	7,731	54.84%	Zakaria Dagang (PAS)	6,221	44.13%	14,302	1,510	88.22%
2013	N11 Seberang Takir	Ahmad Razif Abdul Rahman (UMNO)	7,731	54.84%	Ahmad Nazri Mohd Yusoff (PKR)	73	0.52%	14,302	1,510	88.22%
2018	N11 Seberang Takir	Ahmad Razif Abdul Rahman (UMNO)	9,340	52.66%	Mohd Fazil Wahab (PAS)	7,456	42.05%	17,996	1,884	87.30%
2018	N11 Seberang Takir	Ahmad Razif Abdul Rahman (UMNO)	9,340	52.66%	Abu Bakar Abdullah (PKR)	939	5.29%	17,996	1,884	87.30%
2023	N11 Seberang Takir	Ahmad Razif Abdul Rahman (UMNO)	9,359	43.50%	Khazan Che Mat (BERSATU)	12,156	56.50%	21,515	2,797	77.58%

== Honours ==
- Terengganu
  - Knight Grand Companion of the Order of Sultan Mizan Zainal Abidin of Terengganu (SSMZ) – Dato' Seri (2014) (revoked 22 April 2016 and reinstated 8 December 2016)
  - Knight Commander of the Order of the Crown of Terengganu (DPMT) – Dato' (2012, revoked 22 April 2016)
  - Companion of the Order of Sultan Mizan Zainal Abidin of Terengganu (SMZ) (2011)
