= Khazan Che Mat =

Malaysian politician

Yang Berhormat Tuan Khazan Che Mat SMZ AMZ MLA
- خزان چئ مت
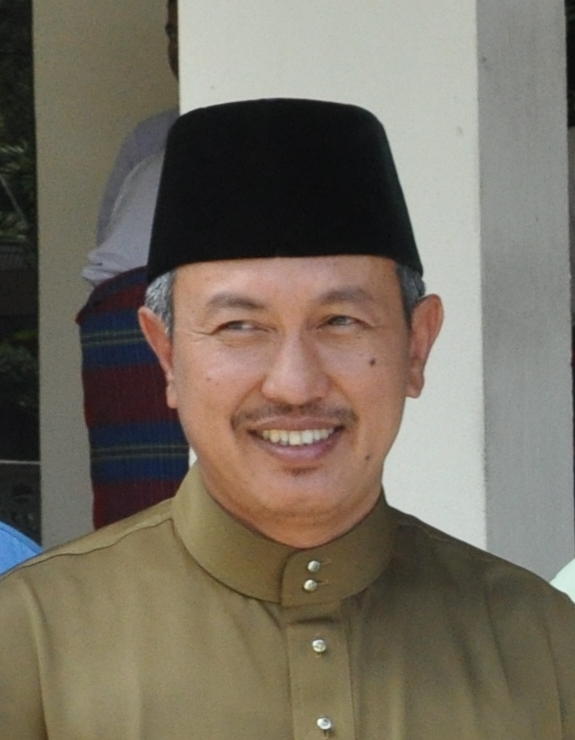

Deputy Speaker of the Terengganu State Legislative Assembly
- Incumbent
- Assumed office 24 September 2023
- Monarch: Mizan Zainal Abidin
- Menteri Besar: Ahmad Samsuri Mokhtar
- Speaker: Mohd Nor Hamzah
- Constituency: Seberang Takir
State Legislative offices
Member of the Terengganu State Legislative Assembly for Seberang Takir
Incumbent
Assumed office 12 August 2023
Preceded by	Ahmad Razif Abdul Rahman
Member of the Terengganu State Legislative Assembly for Batu Rakit
In office 21 March 2004 – 5 May 2013
Preceded by	Abu Bakar Chik
Succeeded by	Bazlan Abd Rahman
State Executive portfolios
Member of the Terengganu State Executive Council
In office 2008–2013
Deputy	Muhammad Ramli Nuh
Menteri Besar	Ahmad Said
Portfolio	Religion and Information
Succeeded by	Information: Mohd Jidin Shafee; Religion: Portfolio abolished
Constituency	Batu Rakit

Personal details
- Born: Khazan bin Che Mat; 9 January 1969 (age 57) Kampung Padang Kemunting, Batu Rakit, Terengganu, Malaysia
- Party: United Malays National Organisation (UMNO); Malaysian United Indigenous Party (BERSATU)
- Other political affiliations: Barisan Nasional (BN); Perikatan Nasional (PN)
- Education: University of Jordan
- Occupation: Politician

Khazan bin Che Mat (born 9 January 1969) is a Malaysian politician who has served as Deputy Speaker of the Terengganu State Legislative Assembly since September 2023 and Member of the Terengganu State Legislative Assembly (MLA) for Seberang Takir since August 2023. He served as Member of the Terengganu State Executive Council (EXCO) in the Barisan Nasional (BN) state administration under Menteri Besar Ahmad Said from March 2008 to May 2013 and MLA for Batu Rakit from March 2004 to May 2013. He is a member and the Division Chief of Kuala Nerus of the Malaysian United Indigenous Party (BERSATU), a component party of the PN coalition and was a member of the United Malays National Organisation (UMNO), a component party of the BN coalition.

== Background ==
Khazan has continued his studies at the University of Jordan in a bachelor's degree in Arabic/Syariah. He started his career in 1995 as assistant director of Education at Yayasan Islam Terengganu until 2004.

== Election results ==
Terengganu State Legislative Assembly
Year	Constituency	Candidate	Votes	Pct	Opponent(s)	Votes	Pct	Ballots cast	Majority	Turnout
2004	N08 Batu Rakit	Khazan Che Mat (UMNO)	5,266	59.56%	Abu Bakar Chik (PAS)	3,576	40.44%	9,007	1,690	87.88%
2008	N08 Batu Rakit	Khazan Che Mat (UMNO)	5,590	57.66%	Shamsudin Abdul Wahab (PAS)	4,104	42.34%	9,811	1,486	86.74%
2023	N11 Seberang Takir	Khazan Che Mat (BERSATU)	12,156	56.65%	Ahmad Razif Abdul Rahman (UMNO)	9,359	43.35%	21,655	2,797	78.08%

== Honours ==
- Terengganu
  - Companion of the Order of Sultan Mizan Zainal Abidin of Terengganu (SMZ) (2025)
  - Member of the Order of Sultan Mizan Zainal Abidin of Terengganu (AMZ) (2006)
