= 2018 Terengganu state election =

Malaysian state legislative election

- 9 May 2018

All 32 seats of the Terengganu State Legislative Assembly 17 seats needed for a majority

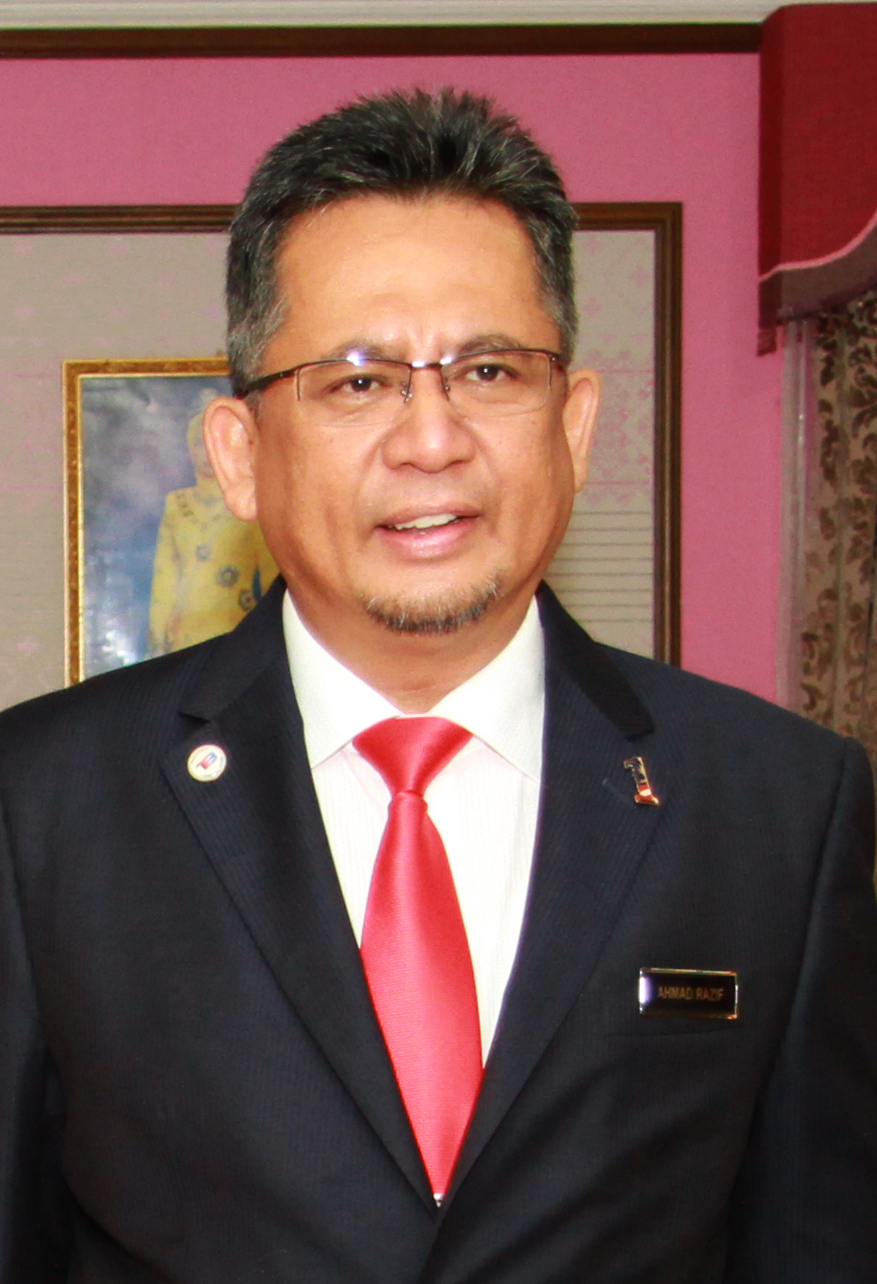

	Majority party	Minority party	Third party
Leader	Husain Awang	Ahmad Razif Abd. Rahman	Raja Kamarul Bahrin Shah Raja Ahmad
Party	Gagasan Sejahtera (PAS)	Barisan Nasional (UMNO)	Pakatan Harapan (Amanah)
Leader since	2017	2014	30 August 2017
Leader's seat	Not contesting (Senator for Dewan Negara)	Seberang Takir	Batu Buruk (lost seat)
Last election	14 seats, 44.52% (Pakatan Rakyat)	17 seats, 51.37%	1 seats, 3.50% (Pakatan Rakyat)
Seats before	14	17	1
Seats won	22	10	0
Seat change	▲9	▼7	▼1
Popular vote	313,503	261,653	45,429
Percentage	50.46%	42.11%	7.31%
Swing	▲5.94%	▼9.26%	▲3.81%
Menteri Besar before election
Ahmad Razif Abd. Rahman
Barisan Nasional
Elected Menteri Besar
Dr. Ahmad Samsuri Mokhtar
Gagasan Sejahtera (PAS)

The 14th Terengganu State election was held on 9 May 2018, concurrently with the 2018 Malaysian general election. The previous state election was held on 5 May 2013. The state assemblymen is elected to 5 years term each.

The Terengganu State Legislative Assembly would automatically dissolve on 17 June 2018, the fifth anniversary of the first sitting, and elections must be held within sixty days (two months) of the dissolution (on or before 17 August 2018, with the date to be decided by the Election Commission), unless dissolved prior to that date by the Head of State (Sultan of Terengganu) on the advice of the Head of Government (Menteri Besar of Terengganu).

Pan-Malaysian Islamic Party (PAS) won the state election with 22 seats out of 32, and were able to wrestle control of the state from Barisan Nasional (BN), who only won 10 seats. PAS therefore has its first government of Terengganu since the 2004 state election, when they lost to BN. Pakatan Harapan (PH) candidates all lost in this election, and thus were unrepresented in the Terengganu Assembly. Ahmad Samsuri Mokhtar from PAS were sworn in as the new Menteri Besar on 10 May 2018.

== Contenders ==
Barisan Nasional (BN) is set to contest all 32 seats in Terengganu State Legislative Assembly. Barisan Nasional (BN) linchpin party United Malays National Organisation (UMNO) is to set to contest major share of Barisan Nasional (BN) seats.

Pan-Malaysian Islamic Party (PAS) is set to contest all 32 seats in Terengganu.

Pakatan Harapan has decided to contest all 32 seats in Terengganu. However, Pakatan Harapan has yet to finalize the seats. Pakatan Harapan will finalize the remaining the seats before 23 February 2018.

=== Political parties ===
Coalition
Incumbent	Opposition	
Barisan Nasional (BN)	Gagasan Sejahtera (GS)	Pakatan Harapan (PH)
United Malays National Organisation (UMNO); Malaysian Chinese Association (MCA)	Malaysian Islamic Party (PAS)	National Trust Party (Amanah); People's Justice Party (PKR); Malaysian United Indigenous Party (Bersatu)

== The contested seats ==
No.	State constituency	Incumbent State Assemblyman	Political parties					
No.	State constituency	Incumbent State Assemblyman	Barisan Nasional		Gagasan Sejahtera		Pakatan Harapan	
No.	State constituency	Incumbent State Assemblyman	Candidate Name	Party	Candidate Name	Party	Candidate Name	Party
N01	Kuala Besut	Tengku Zaihan Che Ku Abd Rahman (BN)	Tengku Zaihan Che Ku Abd Rahman	UMNO	Azbi Salleh	PAS	Che Ku Hashim Che Ku Mat	Bersatu
N02	Kota Putera	Mohd Mahdi Musa (BN)	Mohd Mahdi Musa	UMNO	Mohd Nurkhuzaini Ab Rahman	PAS	Tengku Roslan Tengku Othman	PKR
N03	Jertih	Muhammad Pehimi Yusof (BN)	Muhammad Pehimi Yusof	UMNO	Wan Azhar Wan Ahmad	PAS	Kamarulzaman Wan Su	Amanah
N04	Hulu Besut	Nawi Mohamad (BN)	Nawi Mohamad	UMNO	Mat Daik Mohamad	PAS	Ismail Abdul Kadir	Bersatu
N05	Jabi	Mohd Iskandar Jaafar (BN)	Mohd Iskandar Jaafar	UMNO	Azman Ibrahim	PAS	Abd Aziz Abas	Amanah
N06	Permaisuri	Mohd Jidin Shafee (BN)	Abd Halim Jusoh	UMNO	Zul Bhari A. Rahman	PAS	Wan Mokhtar Wan Ibrahim	PKR
N07	Langkap	Sabri Mohd Noor (BN)	Sabri Mohd Noor	UMNO	Azmi Maarof	PAS	Mustaffa Abdullah	Bersatu
N08	Batu Rakit	Bazlan Abd Rahman (BN)	Bazlan Abd Rahman	UMNO	Mohd Shafizi Ismail	PAS	Amir Long	Bersatu
N09	Tepuh	Hishamuddin Abd Karim (GS)	Basir Ismail	UMNO	Hishamuddin Abd Karim	PAS	Wan Hafizie Suzlie Wan Hassan	Bersatu
N10	Buluh Gading (previously known as Teluk Pasu)	Ridzuan Hashim (GS)	Che Mansor Salleh	UMNO	Ridzuan Hashim	PAS	Azik Chik	Amanah
N11	Seberang Takir	Ahmad Razif Abd Rahman (BN)	Ahmad Razif Abd Rahman	UMNO	Mohd. Fazil Wahab	PAS	Abu Bakar Abdullah	PKR
N12	Bukit Tunggal	Alias Razak (GS)	Tuan Arif Shahibu Fadillah Tuan Ahmad	UMNO	Alias Razak	PAS	Fatimah Lailati Omar	PKR
N13	Wakaf Mempelam	Mohd Abdul Wahid Endut (GS)	Salleh Othman	UMNO	Wan Shukairi Wan Abdullah	PAS	Zubir Mohamed	Amanah
N14	Bandar	Azan Ismail (PH)	Toh Seng Cheng	MCA	Ahmad Shah Muhamed	PAS	Azan Ismail	PKR
N15	Ladang	Tengku Hassan Tengku Omar (GS)	Mohd Sabri Alwi	UMNO	Tengku Hassan Tengku Omar	PAS	Zulkifli Mohamad	Bersatu
N16	Batu Buruk	Syed Azman Syed Ahmad Nawawi (GS)	Zamri Awang Hitam	UMNO	Muhammad Khalil Abd Hadi	PAS	Raja Kamarul Bahrin Shah Raja Ahmad	Amanah
N17	Alur Limbat	Ariffin Deraman (GS)	Saiful Bahri Baharuddin	UMNO	Ariffin Deraman	PAS	Ahmad Sabri Ali	PKR
N18	Bukit Payung	Mohd. Nor Hamzah (GS)	Toh Puan Zaitun Mat Amin	UMNO	Mohd. Nor Hamzah	PAS	Mohd Dalizan Abd Aziz	Amanah
N19	Ru Rendang	Abdul Hadi Awang (GS)	Nik Dir Nik Wan Ku	UMNO	Ahmad Samsuri Mokhtar	PAS	Zarawi Sulong	Amanah
N20	Pengkalan Berangan	A Latiff Awang (BN)	A. Latiff Awang	UMNO	Sulaiman Sulong	PAS	Aidi Ahmad	Bersatu
N21	Telemung	Rozi Mamat (BN)	Rozi Mamat	UMNO	Kamaruzaman Abdullah	PAS	Sharifah Norhayati Syed Omar	PKR
N22	Manir	Hilmi Harun (GS)	Yusof Awang Hitam	UMNO	Hilmi Harun	PAS	Hafizuddin Hussin	Amanah
N23	Kuala Berang	T Putera T Awang (BN)	Tengku Putera Tengku Awang	UMNO	Mamad Puteh	PAS	Mohd Nor Othman	PKR
N24	Ajil	Ghazali Taib (BN)	Ghazali Taib	UMNO	Maliaman Kassim	PAS	Zamani Mamat	Bersatu
N25	Bukit Besi	Roslee Daud (BN)	Roslee Daud	UMNO	Ghazali Sulaiman	PAS	Mohamad Arif Arifin	Bersatu
N26	Rantau Abang	Alias Harun (GS)	Zaulkfli Wan Gati	UMNO	Alias Harun	PAS	Mohammad Padeli Jusoh	PKR
N27	Sura	Wan Hapandi Wan Nik (GS)	Zainun Abu Bakar	UMNO	Wan Hapandi Wan Nik	PAS	Zulkifli Ali	Amanah
N28	Paka	Satiful Bahari Mamat (GS)	Tengku Hamzah Tengku Draman	UMNO	Satiful Bahari Mamat	PAS	Mohd Hasbie Muda	Amanah
N29	Kemasik	Rosli Othman (BN)	Rosli Othman	UMNO	Saiful Azmi Suhaili	PAS	Rizan Ali	Amanah
N30	Kijal	Ahmad Said (BN)	Ahmad Said	UMNO	Hazri Jusoh	PAS	Wan Marzuki Wan Sembok	Bersatu
N31	Cukai	Hanafiah Mat (GS)	Mohamed Awang Tera	UMNO	Hanafiah Mat	PAS	Husain Safri Muhammad	PKR
N32	Air Putih	Wan Abdul Hakim Wan Mokhtar (BN)	Wan Abdul Hakim Wan Mokhtar	UMNO	Ab. Razak Ibrahim	PAS	Mohd Zukri Aksah	PKR

== Election pendulum ==
The 14th General Election witnessed 22 governmental seats and 10 non-governmental seats filled the Terengganu State Legislative Assembly. The government side has 3 safe seats and 4 fairly safe seats, while the non-government side has just a safe and fairly safe seat each one.

2018 Terengganu state election

GOVERNMENT SEATS
Marginal
Ladang	Tengku Hassan Tengku Omar	PAS	43.45
Bandar	Ahmad Shah Muhamed	PAS	44.11
Air Putih	Ab. Razak Ibrahim	PAS	47.36
Ajil	Maliaman Kassim	PAS	48.01
Jabi	Dr. Azman Ibrahim	PAS	48.11
Pengkalan Berangan	Sulaiman Sulong	PAS	48.66
Kota Putera	Mohd. Nurkhuzaini Ab. Rahman	PAS	49.18
Cukai	Hanafiah Mat	PAS	49.56
Kuala Berang	Dr. Mamad Puteh	PAS	50.33
Kemasik	Saiful Azmi Suhaili	PAS	51.62
Paka	Satiful Bahari Hj. Mamat	PAS	53.47
Tepuh	Hishamuddin Abd. Karim	PAS	54.32
Batu Buruk	Muhammad Khalil Abd. Hadi	PAS	54.91
Bukit Tunggal	Dr. Alias Razak	PAS	55.41
Alur Limbat	Ariffin Deraman	PAS	55.64
Fairly safe
Manir	Hilmi Harun	PAS	58.07
Rantau Abang	Alias Harun	PAS	58.34
Bukit Payung	Mohd. Nor Hamzah	PAS	58.77
Buluh Gading	Ridzuan Hashim	PAS	59.42
Safe
Sura	Wan Hapandi Wan Nik	PAS	61.81
Ru Rendang	Dr. Ahmad Samsuri Mokhtar	PAS	61.83
Wakaf Mempelam	Wan Shukairi Wan Abdullah	PAS	62.16

NON-GOVERNMENT SEATS
Marginal
Kuala Besut	Tengku Zaihan Che Ku Abd. Rahman	UMNO	47.23
Bukit Besi	Roslee Daud	UMNO	48.16
Batu Rakit	Bazlan Abd. Rahman	UMNO	48.78
Jertih	Muhammad Pehimi Yusof	UMNO	49.42
Kijal	Ahmad Said	UMNO	49.46
Hulu Besut	Nawi Mohamad	UMNO	51.97
Seberang Takir	Ahmad Razif Abd. Rahman	UMNO	52.66
Permaisuri	Abd. Halim Jusoh	UMNO	52.84
Fairly safe
Langkap	Sabri Mohd. Noor	UMNO	59.45
Safe
Telemung	Rozi Mamat	UMNO	62.26

== Results ==
Party or alliance		Votes	%	Seats	+/–
Gagasan Sejahtera	Pan-Malaysian Islamic Party	313,503	50.46	22	+8
Barisan Nasional	United Malays National Organisation	256,611	41.30	10	–7
Barisan Nasional	Malaysian Chinese Association	5,042	0.81	0	0
Barisan Nasional	Total	261,653	42.11	10	–7
Pakatan Harapan	People's Justice Party	19,167	3.08	0	–1
Pakatan Harapan	National Trust Party	15,303	2.46	0	0
Pakatan Harapan	Malaysian United Indigenous Party	11,680	1.88	0	0
Pakatan Harapan	Total	45,429	7.31	0	–1
Total		621,306	100.00	32	0
Valid votes		621,306	98.80		
Invalid/blank votes		7,520	1.20		
Total votes		628,826	100.00		
Registered voters/turnout		736,632	85.37		
Source: SPR

=== Seats that changed allegiance ===
No.	Seat	Previous Party (2013)	Current Party (2018)
N02	(Terengganu) Kota Putera	Barisan Nasional (UMNO)	Gagasan Sejahtera (PAS)
N05	(Terengganu) Jabi	Barisan Nasional (UMNO)	Gagasan Sejahtera (PAS)
N14	(Terengganu) Bandar	Pakatan Harapan (PKR)	Gagasan Sejahtera (PAS)
N20	(Terengganu) Pengkalan Berangan	Barisan Nasional (UMNO)	Gagasan Sejahtera (PAS)
N23	(Terengganu) Kuala Berang	Barisan Nasional (UMNO)	Gagasan Sejahtera (PAS)
N24	(Terengganu) Ajil	Barisan Nasional (UMNO)	Gagasan Sejahtera (PAS)
N29	(Terengganu) Kemasik	Barisan Nasional (UMNO)	Gagasan Sejahtera (PAS)
N32	(Terengganu) Air Putih	Barisan Nasional (UMNO)	Gagasan Sejahtera (PAS)

== Aftermath ==
Ahmad Razif Abdul Rahman, the former Menteri Besar from UMNO, were appointed as the Opposition Leader in July 2018. However he resigned from the position in February 2019 and was replaced by the newly appointed UMNO/BN State liaison chief, Ahmad Said.
