= Tengku Omar Othman =

2nd Menteri Besar of Terengganu

Tengku Omar bin Othman
- تڠكو عمر بن عثمان
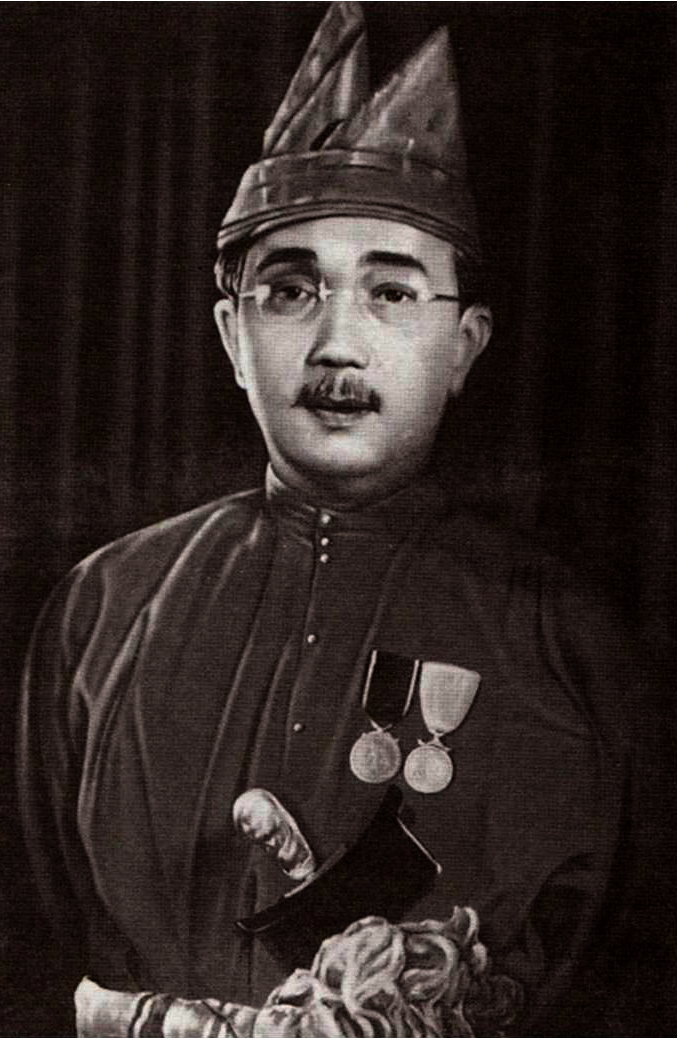
- Tengku Omar Othman in 1940s

Menteri Besar of Terengganu
- In office 15 July 1940 – 9 December 1941
- Preceded by: Haji Ngah Muhammad bin Yusof
- Succeeded by: Da Omar bin Mahmud

Personal details
- Born: December 17, 1884 Ayer Rajah, Singapore
- Died: April 24, 1945 (aged 60) Terengganu
- Relations: Hussein Shah (great-grandfather)
- Occupation: Politician

Tengku Seri Setia Raja Tengku Omar bin Othman was the Menteri Besar of Terengganu, in the Unfederated Malay States, from 15 July 1940 to 9 December 1941.

Tengku Omar was born on 17 December 1884 at Ayer Rajah, Singapore. He was a great-grandson of Sultan Hussein Shah, the last Sultan of Singapore.

Tengku Omar was the second Menteri Besar of Terengganu. His predecessor was Dato’ Seri Amar DiRaja Haji Ngah Muhammad bin Yusof. He was later succeeded by Dato' Jaya Perkasa Da Omar bin Mahmud.

He received several British honours, including membership of the Order of the British Empire, the George V Silver Jubilee Medal, and the George VI Coronation Medal.

Tengku Omar died on 24 April 1945.
