= Alur Limbat =

Political subdivision in Malaysia

Alur Limbat (N17)
Terengganu constituency

State constituency
- Legislature: Terengganu State Legislative Assembly
MLA
Ariffin Deraman
PN
- Constituency created: 1994
- First contested: 1995
- Last contested: 2023

Demographics
- Electors (2023): 36,087

SE15 N17 Alur Limbat within Terengganu Constituency Map.svg

Alur Limbat is a state constituency in Terengganu, Malaysia, that has been represented in the Terengganu State Legislative Assembly.

The state constituency was first contested in 1995 and is mandated to return a single Assemblyman to the Terengganu State Legislative Assembly under the first-past-the-post voting system.

== Demographics ==
Ethnic breakdown of Alur Limbat's electorate as of 2018
1. Malay (96.6%)
2. Chinese (3.08%)
3. Other ethnicities (0.18%)
4. Indian (0.10%)

== History ==
=== Polling districts ===
According to the gazette issued on 30 March 2018, the Alur Limbat constituency has a total of 9 polling districts.

State Constituency	Polling Districts	Code	Location
Alur Limbat (N17)	Pulau Manis	037/17/01	SK Serada
Alur Limbat (N17)	Rawai	037/17/02	SK Simpang Rawai
Alur Limbat (N17)	Tasik	037/17/03	SK Tasek; Balai Raya Kg. Wakaf Dua
Alur Limbat (N17)	Banggul Tok Ku	037/17/04	SK Kampung Baharu Serada
Alur Limbat (N17)	Beladau Selat	037/17/05	SK Bangol Katong
Alur Limbat (N17)	Kepung	037/17/06	SK Kepong
Alur Limbat (N17)	Padang Midin	037/17/07	SK Padang Midin
Alur Limbat (N17)	Gelugur Kedai	037/17/08	SK Gelugor; SMK Padang Midin
Alur Limbat (N17)	Tebakang	037/17/09	SK Simpang Rawai

=== Representation history ===
Members of the Legislative Assembly for Alur Limbat
Assembly	No	Years	Members	Party
Constituency created from Serada, Bukit Payung and Manir
9th	N17	1995–1999	Yahaya Ali	PAS
10th	N17	1999–2004	Yahaya Ali	PAS
11th	N17	2004–2008	Alias Abdullah	BN (UMNO)
12th	N17	2008–2013	Alias Abdullah	BN (UMNO)
13th	N17	2013–2018	Ariffin Deraman	PR (PAS)
14th	N17	2018–2020	Ariffin Deraman	PAS
14th	N17	2020–2023	Ariffin Deraman	PN (PAS)
15th	N17	2023–present	Ariffin Deraman	PN (PAS)

== Election results ==
Terengganu state election, 2023: Alur Limbat
Party	Candidate	Votes	%	∆%
PAS	Ariffin Deraman	20,133	72.92	▲17.28
BN	Yuseri Isa	7,477	27.08	▼11.05
Total valid votes		27,610	100.00	
Total rejected ballots		212		
Unreturned ballots		34		
Turnout		27,856	77.19	▼9.55
Registered electors		36,087		
Majority		12,656	45.84	▲28.33
PAS hold		Swing		

Terengganu state election, 2018: Alur Limbat
Party	Candidate	Votes	%	∆%
PAS	Ariffin Deraman	13,330	55.64	▲4.29
BN	Saiful Bahri Baharuddin	9,136	38.13	▼10.16
PKR	Ahmad Sabri Ali	1,492	6.23	▲6.23
Total valid votes		23,958	100.00	
Total rejected ballots		276		
Unreturned ballots		86		
Turnout		24,320	86.74	▼2.45
Registered electors		28,038		
Majority		4,194	17.51	▲14.45
PAS hold		Swing		

Terengganu state election, 2013: Alur Limbat
Party	Candidate	Votes	%	∆%
PAS	Ariffin Deraman	10,844	51.35	▲3.75
BN	Alias Abdullah	10,199	48.30	▼4.10
Independent	Ja'afar Jambol	74	0.35	▲0.35
Total valid votes		21,117	100.00	
Total rejected ballots		244		
Unreturned ballots		30		
Turnout		21,391	89.19	▲3.35
Registered electors		23,983		
Majority		645	3.05	▼1.74
PAS gain from BN		Swing		-

Terengganu state election, 2008: Alur Limbat
Party	Candidate	Votes	%	∆%
BN	Alias Abdullah	8,735	52.40	▲6.37
PAS	Mustafa Ali	7,936	47.60	▼6.37
Total valid votes		16,671	100.00	
Total rejected ballots		228		
Unreturned ballots		6		
Turnout		16,905	85.84	▼2.26
Registered electors		19,694		
Majority		799	4.79	▼3.16
BN gain from PAS		Swing		-

Terengganu state election, 2004: Alur Limbat
Party	Candidate	Votes	%	∆%
PAS	Alias Abdullah	7,826	53.98	▼9.81
BN	Yahaya Ali	6,673	46.02	▲9.81
Total valid votes		14,499	100.00	
Total rejected ballots		182		
Unreturned ballots		113		
Turnout		14,794	88.10	▲5.49
Registered electors		16,793		
Majority		1,153	7.95	▼19.63
PAS hold		Swing		

Terengganu state election, 1999: Alur Limbat
Party	Candidate	Votes	%	∆%
PAS	Yahaya Ali	7,575	63.79	▲12.54
BN	Alias Abdullah	4,300	36.21	▼12.54
Total valid votes		11,875	100.00	
Total rejected ballots		280		
Unreturned ballots		48		
Turnout		12,203	82.61	▲2.53
Registered electors		14,772		
Majority		3,275	27.58	▲25.09
PAS hold		Swing		

Terengganu state election, 1995: Alur Limbat
Party	Candidate	Votes	%
PAS	Yahaya Ali	5,535	51.25
BN	Azmi Ahmad	5,266	48.75
Total valid votes		10,801	100.00
Total rejected ballots		266	
Unreturned ballots		35	
Turnout		11,102	80.08
Registered electors		13,864	
Majority		269	2.49
This was a new constituency created.
