= Jabi =

Political subdivision in Malaysia

Jabi (N05)
Terengganu constituency

State constituency
- Legislature: Terengganu State Legislative Assembly
MLA
Azman Ibrahim
PN
- Constituency created: 1984
- First contested: 1986
- Last contested: 2023

Demographics
- Electors (2023): 25,192

N05 Jabi within Terengganu, as used for the 2023 state election

Jabi is a state constituency in Terengganu, Malaysia, that has been represented in the Terengganu State Legislative Assembly.

The state constituency was first contested in 1986 and is mandated to return a single Assemblyman to the Terengganu State Legislative Assembly under the first-past-the-post voting system.

== Demographics ==
Ethnic breakdown of Jabi's electorate as of 2018
1. Malay (99.2%)
2. Chinese (0.43%)
3. Other ethnicities (0.26%)
4. Indian (0.01%)

== History ==
=== Polling districts ===
According to the Gazette issued on 30 March 2018, the Jabi constituency has a total of 9 polling districts.

State Constituency	Polling Districts	Code	Location
Jabi (N05)	SK Jabi	034/05/01	SK Jabi
Jabi (N05)	Apal	034/05/02	SK Apal
Jabi (N05)	Tanah Merah	034/05/03	SK Kerandong
Jabi (N05)	Kerandang	034/05/04	SK Bukit Tempurong
Jabi (N05)	Jabi	034/05/05	SMK Jabi
Jabi (N05)	Renek	034/05/06	SK Renek
Jabi (N05)	Tempinis	034/05/07	SK Tempinis
Jabi (N05)	Bukit Jeruk	034/05/08	SK Bukit Jerok
Jabi (N05)	Tok Dor	034/05/09	SK Tok Dor

=== Representation history ===
Members of the Legislative Assembly for Jabi
Assembly	No	Years	Members	Party
Constituency created from Bukit Kenak and Setiu
7th	N05	1986–1990	Hassan Said	BN (UMNO)
8th	N05	1990–1995	Zahari Muhammad	PAS
9th	N05	1995–1999	Mohd Lukman Muda	BN (UMNO)
10th	N05	1999–2004	Shaharizukirnain Abdul Kadir	PAS
11th	N05	2004–2008	Ramlan Ali	BN (UMNO)
12th	N05	2008–2013	Ramlan Ali	BN (UMNO)
13th	N05	2013–2018	Mohd Iskandar Jaafar	BN (UMNO)
14th	N05	2018–2020	Azman Ibrahim	PAS
14th	N05	2020–2023	Azman Ibrahim	PN (PAS)
15th	N05	2023–present	Azman Ibrahim	PN (PAS)

== Election results ==
Terengganu state election, 2023: Jabi
Party	Candidate	Votes	%	∆%
PAS	Azman Ibrahim	11,523	62.73	▲14.62
BN	Rosdi Zakaria	6,847	37.27	▼10.51
Total valid votes		18,370	100.00	
Total rejected ballots		116		
Unreturned ballots		16		
Turnout		18,502	73.44	▼10.83
Registered electors		25,192		
Majority		4,676	25.46	▲25.13
PAS hold		Swing		

Terengganu state election, 2018: Jabi
Party	Candidate	Votes	%	∆%
PAS	Azman Ibrahim	8,061	48.11	▲0.77
BN	Mohd Iskandar Jaafar	8,006	47.78	▼4.88
PKR	Abd Rahman @ Abdul Aziz Abas	690	4.12	▲4.12
Total valid votes		16,757	100.00	
Total rejected ballots		243		
Unreturned ballots		0		
Turnout		20,090	84.27	
Total electors		23,839		
Majority		55	0.33	▼4.99
PAS gain from BN		Swing		?
Source(s): Election Commission of Malaysia.; The Star Malaysia.

Terengganu state election, 2013: Jabi
Party	Candidate	Votes	%	∆%
BN	Mohd Iskandar Jaafar	7,735	52.66	▼0.71
PAS	Azman Ibrahim	6,953	47.34	▲0.71
Total valid votes		14,688	100.00	
Total rejected ballots		142		
Unreturned ballots		35		
Turnout		14,865	88.55	▲2.73
Registered electors		16,787		
Majority		782	5.32	▼1.42
BN hold		Swing		
Source(s): Sinar Harian.

Terengganu state election, 2008: Jabi
Party	Candidate	Votes	%	∆%
BN	Ramlan Ali	6,364	53.37	▼1.87
PAS	Azman Ibrahim	5,560	46.63	▲1.87
Total valid votes		11,924	100.00	
Total rejected ballots		151		
Unreturned ballots		0		
Turnout		12,075	85.82	▼1.76
Registered electors		14,070		
Majority		804	6.74	▼3.73
BN hold		Swing		

Terengganu state election, 2004: Jabi
Party	Candidate	Votes	%	∆%
BN	Ramlan Ali	5,800	55.24	▲13.99
PAS	Shaharizukirnain Abdul Kadir	4,700	44.76	▼13.99
Total valid votes		10,500	100.00	
Total rejected ballots		155		
Unreturned ballots		0		
Turnout		10,655	87.58	▲7.71
Registered electors		12,166		
Majority		1,100	10.48	▼7.03
BN gain from PAS		Swing		-

Terengganu state election, 1999: Jabi
Party	Candidate	Votes	%	∆%
PAS	Shaharizukirnain Abdul Kadir	5,013	58.76	▲8.92
BN	Ramlan Ali	3,519	41.24	▼8.92
Total valid votes		8,532	100.00	
Total rejected ballots		200		
Unreturned ballots		11		
Turnout		8,743	79.87	▼2.01
Registered electors		10,946		
Majority		1,494	17.51	▲17.18
PAS gain from BN		Swing		-

Terengganu state election, 1995: Jabi
Party	Candidate	Votes	%	∆%
BN	Mohd Lukman Muda	4,124	50.16	▲7.18
PAS	Zahari Muhammad	4,097	49.84	▼7.18
Total valid votes		8,221	100.00	
Total rejected ballots		203		
Unreturned ballots		12		
Turnout		8,436	81.89	▼1.86
Registered electors		10,302		
Majority		27	0.33	▼13.70
BN gain from PAS		Swing		-

Terengganu state election, 1990: Jabi
Party	Candidate	Votes	%	∆%
PAS	Zahari Muhammad	4,210	57.02	▲11.29
BN	Hassan Said	3,174	42.98	▼11.29
Total valid votes		7,384	100.00	
Total rejected ballots		192		
Unreturned ballots		0		
Turnout		7,576	83.75	▲1.67
Registered electors		9,046		
Majority		1,036	14.03	▲5.48
PAS gain from BN		Swing		-

Terengganu state election, 1986: Jabi
Party	Candidate	Votes	%
BN	Hassan Said	3,491	54.28
PAS	Zahari Muhammad	2,941	45.72
Total valid votes		6,432	100.00
Total rejected ballots		209	
Unreturned ballots		0	
Turnout		6,641	82.08
Registered electors		8,091	
Majority		550	8.55
This was a new constituency created.
