= Kemasik (state constituency) =

Political subdivision in Malaysia

Kemasik (N29)
Terengganu constituency

State constituency
- Legislature: Terengganu State Legislative Assembly
MLA
Saiful Azmi Suhaili
PN
- Constituency created: 1973
- First contested: 1974
- Last contested: 2023

Demographics
- Electors (2023): 28,618

N29 Kemasik within Terengganu, as used for the 2023 state election

Kemasik is a state constituency in Terengganu, Malaysia, that has been represented in the Terengganu State Legislative Assembly.

The state constituency was first contested in 1974 and is mandated to return a single Assemblyman to the Terengganu State Legislative Assembly under the first-past-the-post voting system.

== Demographics ==
Ethnic breakdown of Kemasik's electorate as of 2018
1. Malay (96.1%)
2. Chinese (3.27%)
3. Indian (0.33%)
4. Other ethnicities (0.32%)

== History ==
=== Polling districts ===
According to the Gazette issued on 30 March 2018, the Kemasik constituency has a total of 11 polling districts.

State Constituency	Polling Districts	Code	Location
Kemasik (N29)	Batu Putih	040/29/01	SK Pengkalan Ranggon
Kemasik (N29)	FELDA Kertih 6	040/29/02	SK Ketengah Jaya
Kemasik (N29)	Kampung Ranggon	040/29/03	SK Pengkalan Ranggon
Kemasik (N29)	Kuala Kertih	040/29/04	SK Kerteh
Kemasik (N29)	Pekan Kertih	040/29/05	SK Seri Gelugor
Kemasik (N29)	Kemasik	040/29/06	SMK Badrul Alam Shah
Kemasik (N29)	Pekan Air Jernih	040/29/07	SK Ayer Jerneh
Kemasik (N29)	FELDA Kertih 5	040/29/08	SK Kg. Baru Rasau Kertih 5
Kemasik (N29)	Chabang	040/29/09	SK Kg Chabang
Kemasik (N29)	Tok Kaya	040/29/10	SK Kemasik
Kemasik (N29)	Rantau Petronas	040/29/11	SK Kg Baru Kerteh

=== Representation history ===
Members of the Legislative Assembly for Kemasik
Assembly	No	Years	Member	Party
Constituency split from Paka-Kerteh, Kemaman Utara and Kemaman Selatan
Kemasek
4th	N26	1974–1978	Wan Adnan Wan Ismail	BN (UMNO)
5th	N26	1978–1982	Wan Adnan Wan Ismail	BN (UMNO)
6th	N26	1982–1986	Wan Adnan Wan Ismail	BN (UMNO)
Kemasik
7th	N29	1986–1990	Mohd Abu Bakar Ali	BN (UMNO)
8th	N29	1990–1995	Mohd Abu Bakar Ali	BN (UMNO)
9th	N29	1995–1999	Mohd Abu Bakar Ali	BN (UMNO)
10th	N29	1999–2004	Mohd Abu Bakar Ali	BN (UMNO)
11th	N29	2004–2008	Mohd Abu Bakar Ali	BN (UMNO)
12th	N29	2008–2013	Rosli Othman	BN (UMNO)
13th	N29	2013–2018	Rosli Othman	BN (UMNO)
14th	N29	2018–2020	Saiful Azmi Suhaili	GS (PAS)
14th	N29	2020–2023	Saiful Azmi Suhaili	PN (PAS)
15th	N29	2023–present	Saiful Azmi Suhaili	PN (PAS)

== Election results ==
Terengganu state election, 2023
Party	Candidate	Votes	%	∆%
PAS	Saiful Azmi Suhaili	13,778	65.45	▲13.83
BN	Mohd Khairi Afiq Mohd Yusof	7,273	34.55	▼5.49
Total valid votes		21,051	100.00	
Total rejected ballots		164		
Unreturned ballots		21		
Turnout		21,236	74.21	▼11.58
Registered electors		28,618		
Majority		6,505	30.90	▲19.32
PAS hold		Swing		

Terengganu state election, 2018
Party	Candidate	Votes	%	∆%
PAS	Saiful Azmi Suhaili	9,645	51.62	▲6.37
BN	Rosli Othman	7,481	40.04	▼10.76
PKR	Rizan Ali	1,557	8.33	▲8.33
Total valid votes		18,683	100.00	
Total rejected ballots		217		
Unreturned ballots		87		
Turnout		18,987	85.79	▼1.47
Registered electors		22,132		
Majority		2,164	11.58	▲6.04
PAS gain from BN		Swing		-

Terengganu state election, 2013
Party	Candidate	Votes	%	∆%
BN	Rosli Othman	8,230	50.80	▼7.45
PAS	Che Alias Hamid	7,332	45.26	▲3.51
Independent	Zulkiflee Salleh	638	3.94	▲3.94
Total valid votes		16,200	100.00	
Total rejected ballots		198		
Unreturned ballots		47		
Turnout		16,445	87.26	▲3.42
Registered electors		18,847		
Majority		898	5.54	▼10.96
BN hold		Swing		

Terengganu state election, 2008
Party	Candidate	Votes	%	∆%
BN	Rosli Othman	7,475	58.25	▼4.88
PAS	Mahadi Nawi	5,357	41.75	▲4.88
Total valid votes		12,832	100.00	
Total rejected ballots		129		
Unreturned ballots		8		
Turnout		12,969	83.83	▼3.82
Registered electors		15,470		
Majority		2,118	16.51	▼9.76
BN hold		Swing		

Terengganu state election, 2004
Party	Candidate	Votes	%	∆%
BN	Mohamad Ali	7,409	63.13	▲12.49
PAS	Che Alias Hamid	4,327	36.87	▼12.49
Total valid votes		11,736	100.00	
Total rejected ballots		115		
Unreturned ballots		3		
Turnout		11,854	87.65	▲6.05
Registered electors		13,524		
Majority		3,082	26.26	▲24.97
BN hold		Swing		

Terengganu state election, 1999
Party	Candidate	Votes	%	∆%
BN	Mohamad Ali	4,083	50.65	▼17.61
PAS	Che Alias Hamid	3,979	49.35	▲49.35
Total valid votes		8,062	100.00	
Total rejected ballots		135		
Unreturned ballots		5		
Turnout		8,202	81.60	▲0.08
Registered electors		10,051		
Majority		104	1.29	▼35.23
BN hold		Swing		

Terengganu state election, 1995
Party	Candidate	Votes	%	∆%
BN	Mohamad Ali	5,256	68.26	▲1.30
S46	Jahaya Abdul Rahman	2,444	31.74	▲31.74
Total valid votes		7,700	100.00	
Total rejected ballots		185		
Unreturned ballots		10		
Turnout		7,895	81.53	▼3.29
Registered electors		9,684		
Majority		2,812	36.52	▲2.60
BN hold		Swing		

Terengganu state election, 1990
Party	Candidate	Votes	%	∆%
BN	Mohamad Ali (Abu Bakar Ali)	4,756	66.96	▼7.07
PAS	Yusoff Tahir	2,347	33.04	▲7.07
Total valid votes		7,103	100.00	
Total rejected ballots		176		
Unreturned ballots		5		
Turnout		7,284	84.82	▲6.20
Registered electors		8,588		
Majority		2,409	33.92	▼14.13
BN hold		Swing		

Terengganu state election, 1986
Party	Candidate	Votes	%	∆%
BN	Mohamad Ali	3,186	74.02	▲4.19
PAS	Mohd Zahid Mohd Shah	1,118	25.98	▼4.19
Total valid votes		4,304	100.00	
Total rejected ballots		131		
Unreturned ballots		0		
Turnout		4,435	78.62	▼0.02
Registered electors		5,641		
Majority		2,068	48.05	▲8.39
BN hold		Swing		

Terengganu state election, 1982: Kemasek
Party	Candidate	Votes	%	∆%
BN	Wan Adnan Ismail	4,254	69.83	▲4.42
PAS	Awang Dagang Jusoh	1,838	30.17	▼4.42
Total valid votes		6,092	100.00	
Total rejected ballots		256		
Unreturned ballots		0		
Turnout		6,348	78.64	▲3.81
Registered electors		8,072		
Majority		2,416	39.66	▲8.83
BN hold		Swing		

Terengganu state election, 1978: Kemasek
Party	Candidate	Votes	%	∆%
BN	Wan Adnan Ismail	3,270	65.41	▼11.37
PAS	Awang Dagang Jusoh	1,729	34.59	▲34.59
Total valid votes		4,999	100.00	
Total rejected ballots		383		
Unreturned ballots		0		
Turnout		5,382	74.83	▲1.01
Registered electors		7,192		
Majority		1,541	30.83	▼22.73
BN hold		Swing		

Terengganu state election, 1974: Kemasek
Party	Candidate	Votes	%
BN	Wan Adnan Ismail	3,313	76.78
Parti Sosialis Rakyat Malaysia	Ibrahim Jusoh	1,002	23.22
Total valid votes		4,315	100.00
Total rejected ballots		415	
Unreturned ballots		0	
Turnout		4,730	73.83
Registered electors		6,407	
Majority		2,311	53.56
This was a new constituency created.
