= Wakaf Mempelam (state constituency) =

Political subdivision in Malaysia

Wakaf Mempelam (N13)
Terengganu constituency

State constituency
- Legislature: Terengganu State Legislative Assembly
MLA
Wan Sukairi Wan Abdullah
PN
- Constituency created: 1973
- First contested: 1974
- Last contested: 2023

Demographics
- Electors (2023): 34,509

N13 Wakaf Mempelam within Terengganu, as used for the 2023 state election

Wakaf Mempelam is a state constituency in Terengganu, Malaysia, that has been represented in the Terengganu State Legislative Assembly.

The state constituency was first contested in 1974 and is mandated to return a single Assemblyman to the Terengganu State Legislative Assembly under the first-past-the-post voting system.

== Demographics ==
Ethnic breakdown of Wakaf Mempelam's electorate as of 2018
1. Malay (99.4%)
2. Chinese (0.39%)
3. Other ethnicities (0.11%)
4. Indian (0.06%)

== History ==
=== Polling districts ===
According to the Gazette issued on 30 March 2018, the Wakaf Mempelam constituency has a total of 12 polling districts.

State Constituency	Polling Districts	Code	Location
Wakaf Mempelam (N13)	Pulau Rusa	036/13/01	SK Pulau Rusa
Wakaf Mempelam (N13)	Paluh	036/13/02	SK Paloh
Wakaf Mempelam (N13)	Losong Datok Amar	036/13/03	SK Bukit Lasong
Wakaf Mempelam (N13)	Losong Penglima Perang	036/13/04	SK Bukit Lasong
Wakaf Mempelam (N13)	Losong Haji Mat Shafie	036/13/05	SMK Sultan Ahmad
Wakaf Mempelam (N13)	Seberang Baruh	036/13/06	SK Pusat Chabang Tiga
Wakaf Mempelam (N13)	Wakaf Beruas	036/13/07	SMK Bukit Besar
Wakaf Mempelam (N13)	Merbau Patah	036/13/08	SMK Seri Nilam
Wakaf Mempelam (N13)	Durian Burung	036/13/09	SK Durian Burung
Wakaf Mempelam (N13)	Sungai Rengas	036/13/10	SMK Seri Nilam
Wakaf Mempelam (N13)	Wakaf Mempelam	036/13/11	SK Wakaf Mempelam
Wakaf Mempelam (N13)	Kuala Bekah	036/13/12	SK Rengas Bekah

=== Representation history ===
Members of the Legislative Assembly for Wakaf Mempelam
Assembly	No	Years	Member	Party
Constituency created from Kuala Trengganu Tengah, Bukit Besar, Batu Burok and Binjai
4th	N19	1974–1978	Mohamed @ Harun Jusoh	BN (PAS)
5th	N19	1978–1982	Shafie Abdul Rahman	BN (UMNO)
6th	N19	1982–1986	Mustafa @ Hassan Ali	PAS
7th	N16	1986–1990	Mustafa @ Hassan Ali	PAS
8th	N16	1990–1995	Mohd Abdul Wahid Endut	PAS
9th	N13	1995–1999	Mohd Abdul Wahid Endut	PAS
10th	N13	1999–2004	Mohd Abdul Wahid Endut	PAS
11th	N13	2004–2008	Mohd Abdul Wahid Endut	PAS
12th	N13	2008–2013	Mohd Abdul Wahid Endut	PR (PAS)
13th	N13	2013–2018	Mohd Abdul Wahid Endut	PR (PAS)
14th	N13	2018–2020	Wan Sukairi Wan Abdullah	PAS
14th	N13	2020–2023	Wan Sukairi Wan Abdullah	PN (PAS)
15th	N13	2023–present	Wan Sukairi Wan Abdullah	PN (PAS)

== Election results ==
Terengganu state election, 2023
Party	Candidate	Votes	%	∆%
PAS	Wan Sukairi Wan Abdullah	22,345	85.73	▲23.57
PH	Wan Mohd Haikal Wan Ghazali	3,718	14.27	▲14.27
Total valid votes		26,063	100.00	
Total rejected ballots		196		
Unreturned ballots		27		
Turnout		26,286	76.17	▼9.82
Registered electors		34,509		
Majority		18,627	71.47	▲40.47
PAS hold		Swing		
Source(s) Astro Awani

Terengganu state election, 2018
Party	Candidate	Votes	%	∆%
PAS	Wan Sukairi Wan Abdullah	14,796	62.16	▲5.39
BN	Salleh Othman	7,418	31.16	▼12.06
PKR	Mohd Zubir Mohamed	1,589	6.68	▲6.68
Total valid votes		23,803	100.00	
Total rejected ballots		227		
Unreturned ballots		99		
Turnout		24,129	85.99	▼2.36
Registered electors		28,059		
Majority		7,378	31.00	▲17.45
PAS hold		Swing		

Terengganu state election, 2013
Party	Candidate	Votes	%	∆%
PAS	Mohd Abdul Wahid Endut	12,515	56.77	▲0.36
BN	Wan Mahyudin W. Ngah	9,529	43.23	▼0.36
Total valid votes		22,044	100.00	
Total rejected ballots		220		
Unreturned ballots		37		
Turnout		22,301	88.36	▲4.38
Registered electors		25,240		
Majority		2,986	13.55	▲0.72
PAS hold		Swing		

Terengganu state election, 2008
Party	Candidate	Votes	%	∆%
PAS	Mohd Abdul Wahid Endut	9,645	56.41	▲0.22
BN	Othman Awang	7,452	43.59	▼0.22
Total valid votes		17,097	100.00	
Total rejected ballots		156		
Unreturned ballots		24		
Turnout		17,277	83.98	▼1.94
Registered electors		20,573		
Majority		2,193	12.83	▲0.44
PAS hold		Swing		

Terengganu state election, 2004
Party	Candidate	Votes	%	∆%
PAS	Mohd Abdul Wahid Endut	8,565	56.19	▼17.41
BN	Hamzah Mohamad Zain	6,677	43.81	▲17.41
Total valid votes		15,242	100.00	
Total rejected ballots		152		
Unreturned ballots		5		
Turnout		15,399	85.92	▲6.70
Registered electors		17,922		
Majority		1,888	12.39	▼34.82
PAS hold		Swing		

Terengganu state election, 1999
Party	Candidate	Votes	%	∆%
PAS	Mohd Abdul Wahid Endut	8,981	73.60	▲18.80
BN	Muhamad Ngah	3,221	26.40	▼18.80
Total valid votes		12,202	100.00	
Total rejected ballots		258		
Unreturned ballots		36		
Turnout		12,496	79.22	▲0.21
Registered electors		15,773		
Majority		5,760	47.21	▲37.59
PAS hold		Swing		

Terengganu state election, 1995
Party	Candidate	Votes	%	∆%
PAS	Mohd Abdul Wahid Endut	6,379	54.81	▲0.28
BN	Sulong Mamat	5,260	45.19	▲0.60
Total valid votes		11,639	100.00	
Total rejected ballots		236		
Unreturned ballots		23		
Turnout		11,898	79.01	▼2.03
Registered electors		15,059		
Majority		1,119	9.61	▼0.32
PAS hold		Swing		

Terengganu state election, 1990
Party	Candidate	Votes	%	∆%
PAS	Mohd Abdul Wahid Endut	6,383	54.52	▲3.96
BN	Abd. Latif Mohd	5,220	44.59	▼4.85
Independent	Wan Deraman Wan Nik	104	0.89	▲0.89
Total valid votes		11,707	100.00	
Total rejected ballots		450		
Unreturned ballots		10		
Turnout		12,167	81.04	▲4.26
Registered electors		15,013		
Majority		1,163	9.93	▲8.81
PAS hold		Swing		

Terengganu state election, 1986
Party	Candidate	Votes	%	∆%
PAS	Mustafa Ali	4,702	50.56	▼1.09
BN	Abd. Latif Mohd	4,597	49.44	▲3.64
Total valid votes		9,299	100.00	
Total rejected ballots		388		
Unreturned ballots		0		
Turnout		9,687	76.78	▼0.89
Registered electors		12,616		
Majority		105	1.13	▼4.73
PAS hold		Swing		

Terengganu state election, 1982
Party	Candidate	Votes	%	∆%
PAS	Mustafa Ali	3,712	51.66	▲18.87
BN	Mohamed @ Shafie Deraman @ Abd. Rahman	3,291	45.80	▼0.98
Parti Sosialis Rakyat Malaysia	Syed Shafie Tuan Baharu	183	2.55	▼17.89
Total valid votes		7,186	100.00	
Total rejected ballots		172		
Unreturned ballots		0		
Turnout		7,358	77.67	▲2.60
Registered electors		9,473		
Majority		421	5.86	▼8.14
PAS gain from BN		Swing		-

Terengganu state election, 1978
Party	Candidate	Votes	%	∆%
BN	Shafie Abd. Rahman	2,580	46.78	▲46.78
PAS	Che Wan Long Ibrahim	1,808	32.78	▼22.34
Parti Sosialis Rakyat Malaysia	Embong Ngah	1,127	20.44	▼24.44
Total valid votes		5,515	100.00	
Total rejected ballots		360		
Unreturned ballots		0		
Turnout		5,875	75.07	▲3.50
Registered electors		7,826		
Majority		772	14.00	▲3.75
BN hold		Swing		

Terengganu state election, 1974
Party	Candidate	Votes	%
BN	Mohamed Jusoh	2,355	55.13
Parti Sosialis Rakyat Malaysia	Embong Ngah	1,917	44.87
Total valid votes		4,272	100.00
Total rejected ballots		410	
Unreturned ballots		0	
Turnout		4,682	71.57
Registered electors		6,542	
Majority		438	10.25
This was a new constituency created.
