= Terengganu State Legislative Assembly =

Legislative branch of the Terengganu state government

Terengganu State Legislative Assembly Dewan Undangan Negeri Terengganu ديوان اوندڠن نݢري ترڠݢانو
- 15th Terengganu State Legislative Assembly

Type
- Type: Unicameral

History
- Founded: 20 June 1959

Leadership
- Sultan: Al-Wathiqu Billah Al-Sultan Mizan Zainal Abidin Almarhum Sultan Mahmud Al-Muktafi Billah Shah Al-Haj since 15 May 1998
- Speaker: Mohd Nor Hamzah, PN–PAS since 24 September 2023
- Deputy Speaker: Khazan Che Mat, PN–BERSATU since 24 September 2023
- Menteri Besar: Ahmad Samsuri Mokhtar, PN–PAS since 10 May 2018
- Opposition Leader: Vacant since 12 August 2023
- Secretary: Zulkifli Isa

Structure
- Seats: 32 + 1 Nominated Member (Maximum 34 Members); Quorum: 11; Simple majority: 17; Two-thirds majority: 22
- Political groups: (As of 16 November 2026) Government (33): PN (33): PAS (27); BERSATU (5); GERAKAN (1); Speaker (1); PN (MLA for Bukit Payung)
- Committees: 2: Public Accounts Committee; Committee of Privileges

Elections
- Voting system: Plurality: First-past-the-post (32 single-member constituencies)
- Last election: 12 August 2023
- Next election: By 23 November 2028

Meeting place
- Wisma Darul Iman, Kuala Terengganu, Terengganu

Website
- dun.terengganu.gov.my

The Terengganu State Legislative Assembly (Malay: Dewan Undangan Negeri Terengganu) is the unicameral state legislature of the Malaysian state of Terengganu. It consists of 32 members representing single-member constituencies throughout the state. Elections are held no more than five years apart, and are customarily held alongside elections to the federal parliament during a general election.

The State Assembly convenes at the Wisma Darul Iman in the state capital, Kuala Terengganu.

All 32 seats are held by the Perikatan Nasional (PN) ruling coalition after the 2023 state election, effectively making it a one-party state. Within the coalition, the Malaysian Islamic Party (PAS) holds 27 seats while the Malaysian United Indigenous Party (BERSATU) holds 5 seats. The PN coalition commands a supermajority in the assembly.

Map of current constituencies (since 2018)

== Composition ==
Government
PN
33
27	5	1
PAS	BERSATU	GERAKAN

No.	Parliamentary constituency	No.	State Constituency	Member	Coalition (Party)	Post
P33	Besut	N1	Kuala Besut	Azbi Salleh	PN (PAS)	N/A
P33	Besut	N2	Kota Putera	Mohd. Nurkhuzaini Ab. Rahman	PN (PAS)	EXCO Member
P33	Besut	N3	Jertih	Riduan Md Nor	PN (PAS)	N/A
P33	Besut	N4	Hulu Besut	Mohd Husaimi Hussin	PN (BERSATU)	Deputy EXCO Member
P34	Setiu	N5	Jabi	Azman Ibrahim	PN (PAS)	EXCO Member
P34	Setiu	N6	Permaisuri	Mohd Yusop Majid	PN (BERSATU)	Deputy EXCO Member
P34	Setiu	N7	Langkap	Azmi Maarof	PN (PAS)	N/A
P34	Setiu	N8	Batu Rakit	Mohd Shafizi Ismail	PN (PAS)	N/A
P35	Kuala Nerus	N9	Tepuh	Hishamuddin Abdul Karim	PN (PAS)	EXCO Member
P35	Kuala Nerus	N10	Buluh Gading	Ridzuan Hashim	PN (PAS)	Deputy EXCO Member
P35	Kuala Nerus	N11	Seberang Takir	Khazan Che Mat	PN (BERSATU)	Deputy Speaker
P35	Kuala Nerus	N12	Bukit Tunggal	Zaharudin Zahid	PN (PAS)	N/A
P36	Kuala Terengganu	N13	Wakaf Mempelam	Wan Sukairi Wan Abdullah	PN (PAS)	EXCO Member
P36	Kuala Terengganu	N14	Bandar	Ahmad Shah Muhamed	PN (PAS)	Deputy EXCO Member
P36	Kuala Terengganu	N15	Ladang	Zuraida Md Noor	PN (PAS)	Deputy EXCO Member
P36	Kuala Terengganu	N16	Batu Buruk	Muhammad Khalil Abdul Hadi	PN (PAS)	EXCO Member
P37	Marang	N17	Alur Limbat	Ariffin Deraman	PN (PAS)	EXCO Member
P37	Marang	N18	Bukit Payung	Mohd Nor Hamzah	PN (PAS)	Speaker
P37	Marang	N19	Ru Rendang	Ahmad Samsuri Mokhtar	PN (PAS)	Menteri Besar; MP for Kemaman
P37	Marang	N20	Pengkalan Berangan	Sulaiman Sulong	PN (PAS)	Deputy EXCO Member
P38	Hulu Terengganu	N21	Telemung	Mohd Zawawi Ismail	PN (BERSATU)	Deputy EXCO Member
P38	Hulu Terengganu	N22	Manir	Hilmi Harun	PN (PAS)	Deputy EXCO Member
P38	Hulu Terengganu	N23	Kuala Berang	Mamad Puteh	PN (PAS)	Deputy EXCO Member
P38	Hulu Terengganu	N24	Ajil	Maliaman Kassim	PN (PAS)	EXCO Member
P39	Dungun	N25	Bukit Besi	Ghazali Sulaiman	PN (PAS)	N/A
P39	Dungun	N26	Rantau Abang	Mohd Fadhli Rahmi Zulkifli	PN (PAS)	Deputy EXCO Member
P39	Dungun	N27	Sura	Tengku Muhammad Fakhruddin	PN (PAS)	N/A
P39	Dungun	N28	Paka	Satiful Bahri Mamat	PN (PAS)	EXCO Member
P40	Kemaman	N29	Kemasik	Saiful Azmi Suhaili	PN (PAS)	Deputy EXCO Member
P40	Kemaman	N30	Kijal	Razali Idris	PN (BERSATU)	EXCO Member
P40	Kemaman	N31	Cukai	Hanafiah Mat	PN (PAS)	EXCO Member
P40	Kemaman	N32	Air Putih	Mohd Hafiz Adam	PN (PAS)	N/A
N/A	N/A	—	Nominated member	Chan Chee How	PN (GERAKAN)	N/A

== Seating arrangement ==
N32 Air Putih (Deputy EXCO)	Vacant	N21 Telemung (Deputy EXCO)	Vacant	N12 Bukit Tunggal	Vacant	N01 Kuala Besut	Chan Chee How
Vacant	B						N25 Bukit Besi
N07 Langkap							N27 Sura
N08 Batu Rakit	C					A	N02 Kota Putera (EXCO Member)
N26 Rantau Abang (Deputy EXCO)	C					A	N31 Chukai (EXCO Member)
N06 Permaisuri (Deputy EXCO)	C					A	N24 Ajil (EXCO Member)
N04 Hulu Besut (Deputy EXCO)	C					A	N17 Alur Limbat (EXCO Member)
N11 Seberang Takir (Deputy Speaker)	C					A	N09 Tepuh (EXCO Member)
N22 Manir (Deputy EXCO)	C					A	N13 Wakaf Mempelam (EXCO Member)
N20 Pengkalan Berangan (Deputy EXCO)	C					A	N16 Batu Buruk (EXCO Member)
N15 Ladang (Deputy EXCO)	C					A	N05 Jabi (EXCO Member)
N29 Kemasik (Deputy EXCO)	C					A	N30 Kijal (EXCO Member)
N10 Buluh Gading (Deputy EXCO)	C		the Mace			A	N28 Paka (EXCO Member)
N23 Kuala Berang (Deputy EXCO)	C					A	State Financial Officer
N18 Bukit Payung (Speaker)	C					A	State Legal Advisor
N03 Jertih	C		Sergeant-at-Arm			A	State Secretary
N14 Bandar (Deputy EXCO)	C		Secretary			A	N19 Ru Rendang (Menteri Besar)
			Speaker
			Sultan

== Role ==
The Terengganu State Assembly's main function is to enact state laws and policies. It is also in charge of oversight of departments and agencies of the state government. Members of the assembly are responsible for checking and criticising the executive government's actions.

The leader of the party or coalition with a majority of seats in the assembly is appointed Menteri Besar by the Sultan of Terengganu. The Menteri Besar then appoints members of the state executive council, or EXCO (Majlis Mesyuarat Kerajaan Negeri) from members of the assembly.

== Speakers Roll of Honour ==
The following is the Speaker of the Terengganu State Legislative Assembly Roll of Honour, since 1959:

No.	Speaker	Term start	Term end	Party	Constituency
1	Engku Muhsein Abdul Kadir	1 June 1957	29 April 1959	Alliance (UMNO)	Non-MLA
2	Mohd Taib Sabri Abu Bakar	27 July 1959	11 May 1964	PMIP	Marang
3	Mohd Taha Embong	11 May 1964	27 October 1967	Alliance (UMNO)	Chukai
4	Che Wan Abd. Ghani Zainal	28 November 1967	20 March 1969	Alliance (UMNO)	Non-MLA
5	Abd Rahman Long	1 May 1971	31 July 1974	Alliance (UMNO)	Langkap
6	Abdullah Abdul Rahman	27 October 1974	12 June 1978	BN (UMNO)	Batu Rakit
7	Mohd Salleh Ismail	30 July 1978	29 March 1982	BN (UMNO)	Non-MLA
8	Hussein Abdullah	14 June 1982	18 July 1986	BN (UMNO)	Hulu Besut
9	Syed Omar Mohamad	8 September 1986	1990	BN (UMNO)	Paka
9	Syed Omar Mohamad	1990	11 November 1996	BN (UMNO)	Non-MLA
10	Abdul Rahman Mohd	24 November 1996	19 December 1999	BN (UMNO)	Non-MLA
11	Hussain Awang	20 December 1999	31 March 2004	BA (PAS)	Non-MLA
12	Che Mat Jusoh	11 April 2004	13 February 2008	BN (UMNO)	Non-MLA
13	Tengku Putera Tengku Awang	5 May 2008	18 April 2013	BN (UMNO)	Non-MLA
14	Mohd Zubir Embong	16 June 2013	30 June 2018	BN (UMNO)	Non-MLA
15	Yahya Ali	1 July 2018	23 September 2023	PN (PAS)	Non-MLA
16	Mohd Nor Hamzah	24 September 2023	present	PN (PAS)	Bukit Payung

== Committees ==
The State Assembly consists of committees to handle administrative matters, including Committee of Privileges and Public Accounts Committee.

== Election pendulum ==
The 2023 Terengganu state election witnessed 32 governmental seats and 0 non-governmental seats filled the Terengganu State Legislative Assembly. The government side has 25 safe seats and 6 fairly safe seats.

2023 Terengganu state election

GOVERNMENT SEATS
Marginal
Telemung	Mohd Zawawi Ismail	BERSATU	50.90
Fairly safe
Seberang Takir	Khazan Che Mat	BERSATU	56.50
Bandar	Ahmad Shah Muhamed	PAS	56.69
Kijal	Razali Idris	BERSATU	58.15
Hulu Besut	Mohd Husaimi Hussin	BERSATU	58.19
Kota Putera	Mohd. Nurkhuzaini Ab. Rahman	PAS	58.31
Langkap	Azmi Maarof	PAS	58.35
Safe
Kuala Besut	Azbi Salleh	PAS	60.91
Ladang	Zuraida Md Noor	PAS	61.54
Jerteh	Riduan Mohamad Nor	PAS	62.10
Jabi	Azman Ibrahim	PAS	62.73
Batu Rakit	Mohd Shafizi Ismail	PAS	63.14
Cukai	Hanafiah Mat	PAS	64.13
Bukit Besi	Ghazali Sulaiman	PAS	63.86
Pengkalan Berangan	Sulaiman Sulong	PAS	64.98
Kemasik	Saiful Azmi Suhaili	PAS	65.45
Air Putih	Mohd Hafiz Adam	PAS	65.65
Ajil	Maliaman Kassim	PAS	66.94
Permaisuri	Mohd Yusop Majid	BERSATU	67.03
Kuala Berang	Mamad Puteh	PAS	67.80
Alur Limbat	Ariffin Deraman	PAS	72.92
Paka	Satiful Bahari Hj. Mamat	PAS	73.39
Tepuh	Hishamuddin Abd. Karim	PAS	73.47
Buluh Gading	Ridzuan Hashim	PAS	73.50
Bukit Tunggal	Zaharudin Zahid	PAS	73.52
Bukit Payung	Mohd. Nor Hamzah	PAS	74.11
Rantau Abang	Mohd Fadhli Rahmi Zulkifli	PAS	75.85
Batu Buruk	Muhammad Khalil Abd. Hadi	PAS	79.58
Sura	Tengku Muhammad Fakhruddin Tengku Md Fauzi	PAS	83.06
Ru Rendang	Dr. Ahmad Samsuri Mokhtar	PAS	85.18
Wakaf Mempelam	Wan Shukairi Wan Abdullah	PAS	85.37
Manir	Hilmi Harun	PAS	85.90

== List of Assemblies ==
Assembly	Term began	Members	Committee	Majority party/coalition
State Council	1954	31	Kamaruddin	Alliance (UMNO)
1st	1959	24	Mohd Daud (1959–1961)	PMIP
1st	1959	24	Ibrahim Fikri I (1961–1964)	Alliance (UMNO–MCA)
2nd	1964	24	Ibrahim Fikri II	Alliance (UMNO–MCA)
3rd	1969	24	Ibrahim Fikri III (1969) Mahmood (1969–1972)	Alliance (UMNO–MCA)
3rd	1969	24	Nik Hassan (1972–1974)	Alliance (UMNO–MCA)–PAS (1972–1973)
3rd	1969	24	Nik Hassan (1972–1974)	BN (UMNO–MCA–PAS) (1973–1974)
4th	1974	28	Wan Mokhtar I	BN (UMNO–MCA–PAS) (1974–1977) BN (UMNO–MCA) (1977–1978)
5th	1978	28	Wan Mokhtar II	BN (UMNO–MCA)
6th	1982	28	Wan Mokhtar III	BN (UMNO–MCA)
7th	1986	32	Wan Mokhtar IV	BN (UMNO–MCA)
8th	1990	32	Wan Mokhtar V	BN (UMNO–MCA)
9th	1995	32	Wan Mokhtar VI	BN (UMNO–MCA)
10th	1999	32	Abdul Hadi	BA (PAS)
11th	2004	32	Idris Jusoh	BN (UMNO–MCA)
12th	2008	32	Ahmad Said I	BN (UMNO–MCA)
13th	2013	32	Ahmad Said II (2014) Ahmad Razif (2014–2018)	BN (UMNO)
14th	2018	32	Ahmad Samsuri I	PAS (2018–2020)
14th	2018	32	Ahmad Samsuri I	PN (PAS) (2020–2023)
15th	2023	32	Ahmad Samsuri II	PN (PAS–BERSATU) (2023–2026)
15th	2023	32	Ahmad Samsuri II	PN (PAS–BERSATU–GERAKAN) (2026–present)
