= Batu Rakit (state constituency) =

Political subdivision in Malaysia

Batu Rakit (N08)
Terengganu constituency

State constituency
- Legislature: Terengganu State Legislative Assembly
MLA
Mohd Shafizi Ismail
PN
- Constituency created: 1959
- First contested: 1959
- Last contested: 2023

Demographics
- Electors (2023): 29,919

N08 Batu Rakit within Terengganu, as used for the 2023 state election

Batu Rakit is a state constituency in Terengganu, Malaysia, that has been represented in the Terengganu State Legislative Assembly.

The state constituency was first contested in 1959 and is mandated to return a single Assemblyman to the Terengganu State Legislative Assembly under the first-past-the-post voting system.

== Demographics ==
Ethnic breakdown of Batu Rakit's electorate as of 2023
1. Malay (99.4%)
2. Other ethnicities (0.34%)
3. Chinese (0.23%)
4. Indian (0.04%)

== History ==
=== Polling districts ===
According to the Gazette issued on 30 March 2018, the Batu Rakit constituency has a total of 11 polling districts.

State Constituency	Polling Districts	Code	Location
Batu Rakit (N08)	Pulau Redang	034/08/01	SK Pulau Redang
Batu Rakit (N08)	Mengabang Lekar	034/08/02	SK Pagar Besi
Batu Rakit (N08)	Darat Batu Rakit	034/08/03	SK Darat Batu Rakit
Batu Rakit (N08)	Batu Rakit	034/08/04	SK Batu Rakit
Batu Rakit (N08)	Maras	034/08/05	SK Maras
Batu Rakit (N08)	Bukit Wan	034/08/06	SK Bukit Wan
Batu Rakit (N08)	Bukit Cempaka	034/08/07	SMK Bukit Chempaka
Batu Rakit (N08)	Padang Kemunting	034/08/08	SMK Tengku Mizan Zainal Abidin
Batu Rakit (N08)	Wakaf Tengah	034/08/09	SMK Kompleks Mengabang Telipot
Batu Rakit (N08)	Mengabang Teliput	034/08/10	SMK Telipot
Batu Rakit (N08)	Mengabang Telung	034/08/11	SK Kompleks Mengabang Telipot

=== Representation History ===
Members of the Legislative Assembly for Batu Rakit
Assembly	No	Years	Member	Party
Constituency created
1st	N06	1959–1964	Mansor Mohamed	Alliance (UMNO)
2nd	N06	1964–1969	Mansor Mohamed	Alliance (UMNO)
		1969–1971	Assembly dissolved	
3rd	N06	1971	Mansor Mohamed	Alliance (UMNO)
3rd	N06	1971–1973	Nik Hassan Abdul Rahman	Alliance (UMNO)
3rd	N06	1973–1974	Nik Hassan Abdul Rahman	BN (UMNO)
4th	N07	1974–1978	Abdullah Abdul Rahman	BN (UMNO)
5th	N07	1978–1982	Wan Ibrahim Wan Othman	BN (UMNO)
6th	N07	1982–1986	Wan Ibrahim Wan Othman	BN (UMNO)
7th	N08	1986–1990	Wan Ibrahim Wan Othman	BN (UMNO)
8th	N08	1990–1995	Abdul Wahab Ngah	BN (UMNO)
9th	N08	1995–1999	Abdul Wahab Ngah	BN (UMNO)
10th	N08	1999–2004	Abu Bakar Chik	BA (PAS)
11th	N08	2004–2008	Khazan Che Mat	BN (UMNO)
12th	N08	2008–2013	Khazan Che Mat	BN (UMNO)
13th	N08	2013–2018	Bazlan Abd Rahman	BN (UMNO)
14th	N08	2018–2023	Bazlan Abd Rahman	BN (UMNO)
15th	N08	2023–present	Mohd Shafizi Ismail	PN (PAS)

== Election results ==
Terengganu state election, 2023
Party	Candidate	Votes	%	∆%
PAS	Mohd Shafizi Ismail	14,465	63.14	▲15.80
BN	Bazlan Abd Rahman	8,446	36.86	▼11.92
Total valid votes		22,911	100.00	
Total rejected ballots		153		
Unreturned ballots		17		
Turnout		23,081	77.14	▼9.73
Registered electors		29,919		
Majority		6,019	26.28	▲24.82
PAS gain from BN		Swing		?

Terengganu state election, 2018
Party	Candidate	Votes	%	∆%
BN	Bazlan Abd Rahman	10,046	48.78	▼7.82
PAS	Mohd Shafizi Ismail	9,747	47.33	▲3.93
PKR	Amir Long	800	3.88	▲3.88
Total valid votes		20,593	99.99	
Total rejected ballots		237		
Unreturned ballots		82		
Turnout		20,912	86.88	▼2.40
Registered electors		24,071		
Majority		299	1.45	▼11.75
BN hold		Swing		
Source(s) "14th General Election Malaysia (GE14 / PRU14) - Terengganu". The Star.

Terengganu state election, 2013
Party	Candidate	Votes	%	∆%
BN	Bazlan Abd Rahman	7,008	56.60	▼1.06
PAS	Che Ghani Che Ambak	5,373	43.40	▲1.06
Total valid votes		12,381	100.00	
Total rejected ballots		134		
Unreturned ballots		26		
Turnout		12,541	89.28	▲2.54
Registered electors		14,047		
Majority		1,635	13.21	▼2.12
BN hold		Swing		

Terengganu state election, 2008
Party	Candidate	Votes	%	∆%
BN	Khazan Che Mat	5,590	57.66	▼1.94
PAS	Shamshudin Ab. Wahab	4,104	42.34	▲1.94
Total valid votes		9,694	100.00	
Total rejected ballots		117		
Unreturned ballots		0		
Turnout		9,811	86.74	▼1.38
Registered electors		11,311		
Majority		1,486	15.33	▼3.87
BN hold		Swing		

Terengganu state election, 2004
Party	Candidate	Votes	%	∆%
BN	Khazan Che Mat	5,283	59.60	▲17.44
PAS	Abu Bakar Chik	3,581	40.40	▼17.44
Total valid votes		8,864	100.00	
Total rejected ballots		167		
Unreturned ballots		0		
Turnout		9,031	88.12	▲4.83
Registered electors		10,249		
Majority		1,702	19.20	▲3.53
BN gain from PAS		Swing		-

Terengganu state election, 1999
Party	Candidate	Votes	%	∆%
PAS	Abu Bakar Chik	4,381	57.83	▲12.08
BN	Ismail Said	3,194	42.17	▼12.08
Total valid votes		7,575	100.00	
Total rejected ballots		218		
Unreturned ballots		16		
Turnout		7,809	83.29	▼1.18
Registered electors		9,376		
Majority		1,187	15.67	▲7.18
PAS gain from BN		Swing		-

Terengganu state election, 1995
Party	Candidate	Votes	%	∆%
BN	Abdul Wahab Ngah	3,769	54.25	▼5.38
PAS	Abu Bakar Chik	3,179	45.75	▲45.75
Total valid votes		6,948	100.00	
Total rejected ballots		229		
Unreturned ballots		12		
Turnout		7,189	84.47	▲0.87
Registered electors		8,511		
Majority		590	8.49	▼12.02
BN hold		Swing		

Terengganu state election, 1990
Party	Candidate	Votes	%	∆%
BN	Abdul Wahab Ngah	4,008	59.63	▼4.92
PAS	Zulkifli Chik	2,629	39.11	▲39.11
Independent	Hussain Mohammad	85	1.26	▲1.26
Total valid votes		6,722	100.00	
Total rejected ballots		246		
Unreturned ballots		0		
Turnout		6,968	83.60	▲2.84
Registered electors		8,335		
Majority		1,379	20.51	▼8.57
BN hold		Swing		

Terengganu state election, 1986
Party	Candidate	Votes	%	∆%
BN	W. Ibrahim W. Othman	3,619	64.54	▲7.20
PAS	Ghazali Ahmad	1,988	35.46	▼7.20
Total valid votes		5,607	100.00	
Total rejected ballots		191		
Unreturned ballots		0		
Turnout		5,798	80.76	▲0.07
Registered electors		7,179		
Majority		1,631	29.09	▲14.40
BN hold		Swing		

Terengganu state election, 1982
Party	Candidate	Votes	%	∆%
BN	W. Ibrahim W. Othman	2,928	57.34	▲2.45
PAS	Daud Awang	2,178	42.66	▼2.45
Total valid votes		5,106	100.00	
Total rejected ballots		149		
Unreturned ballots		0		
Turnout		5,255	80.70	▲2.18
Registered electors		6,512		
Majority		750	14.69	▲4.91
BN hold		Swing		

Terengganu state election, 1978
Party	Candidate	Votes	%	∆%
BN	W. Ibrahim W. Othman	2,391	54.89	▼6.04
PAS	Daud Awang	1,965	45.11	▲45.11
Total valid votes		4,356	100.00	
Total rejected ballots		268		
Unreturned ballots		0		
Turnout		4,624	78.52	▲0.76
Registered electors		5,889		
Majority		426	9.78	▼12.08
BN hold		Swing		

Terengganu state election, 1974
Party	Candidate	Votes	%	∆%
BN	Abdullah Abdul Rahman	2,431	60.93	▼12.76
Parti Sosialis Rakyat Malaysia	Abdul Hamed Embong	1,559	39.07	▲39.07
Total valid votes		3,990	100.00	
Total rejected ballots		315		
Unreturned ballots		0		
Turnout		4,305	77.76	▲8.00
Registered electors		5,536		
Majority		872	21.85	▼25.52
BN gain from Alliance		Swing		-

Terengganu state by-election, 21 August 1971 Upon the resignation of the incumbent, Mansor Mohamed
Party	Candidate	Votes	%	∆%
Alliance	Nik Hassan Abdul Rahman	4,282	73.69	▲16.24
PMIP	Awang Abu Bakar	1,529	26.31	▼16.24
Total valid votes		5,811	100.00	
Total rejected ballots		79		
Unreturned ballots		0		
Turnout		5,890	69.76	▼3.51
Registered electors		8,443		
Majority		2,753	47.38	▲32.48
Alliance hold		Swing		

Terengganu state election, 1969
Party	Candidate	Votes	%	∆%
Alliance	Mansor Mohamed @ Mohamad	3,293	57.45	▼6.78
PMIP	Hashim Yusof	2,439	42.55	▲21.87
Total valid votes		5,732	100.00	
Total rejected ballots		467		
Unreturned ballots		0		
Turnout		6,199	73.27	▼5.64
Registered electors		8,460		
Majority		854	14.90	▼28.65
Alliance hold		Swing		

Terengganu state election, 1964
Party	Candidate	Votes	%	∆%
Alliance	Mansor Mohamed @ Mohamad	3,333	64.23	▲8.79
PMIP	Wan Derahim Wan Mohd.	1,073	20.68	▲8.11
Independent	Mohd. A. Rahman	605	11.66	▲11.66
National Party	Che' A. Rahman Muda	178	3.43	▼20.39
Total valid votes		5,189	100.00	
Total rejected ballots		316		
Unreturned ballots		0		
Turnout		5,505	78.91	▲5.34
Registered electors		6,976		
Majority		2,260	43.55	▲11.93
Alliance hold		Swing		

Terengganu state election, 1959
Party	Candidate	Votes	%
Alliance	Mansor Mohamed @ Mohamad	2,267	55.44
National Party	Abdullah Bidin	974	23.82
PMIP	Mohd. Rashid Su Mahmud	514	12.57
Socialist Front	Mohamed Amin Mohamed	334	8.17
Total valid votes		4,089	100.00
Total rejected ballots		151	
Unreturned ballots		0	
Turnout		4,240	73.57
Registered electors		5,763	
Majority		1,293	31.62
This was a new constituency created.
