= Kijal (state constituency) =

Political subdivision in Malaysia

Kijal (N30)
Terengganu constituency

State constituency
- Legislature: Terengganu State Legislative Assembly
MLA
Razali Idris
PN
- Constituency created: 1984
- First contested: 1986
- Last contested: 2023

Demographics
- Electors (2023): 29,491

N30 Kijal within Terengganu, as used for the 2023 state election

Kijal is a state constituency in Terengganu, Malaysia, that has been represented in the Terengganu State Legislative Assembly.

The state constituency was first contested in 1986 and is mandated to return a single Assemblyman to the Terengganu State Legislative Assembly under the first-past-the-post voting system.

== Demographics ==
Ethnic breakdown of Kijal's electorate as of 2018
1. Malay (97.4%)
2. Chinese (1.80%)
3. Other ethnicities (0.51%)
4. Indian (0.24%)

== History ==
=== Polling districts ===
According to the Gazette issued on 30 March 2018, the Kijal constituency has a total of 9 polling districts.

State Constituency	Polling Districts	Code	Location
Kijal (N30)	Padang Kubu	040/30/01	SK Padang Kubu
Kijal (N30)	Seri Bandi	040/30/02	SK Seri Bandi
Kijal (N30)	Ibok	040/30/03	SK Ibok
Kijal (N30)	Bukit Anak Dara	040/30/04	SK Bukit Anak Dara
Kijal (N30)	Pekan Kijal	040/30/05	SK Kijal
Kijal (N30)	Teluk Kalung	040/30/06	SK Telok Kalong
Kijal (N30)	Bukit Kuang	040/30/07	SK Bukit Kuang; SMK Bukit Kuang
Kijal (N30)	Payoh	040/30/08	SK Payoh
Kijal (N30)	Beris Meraga	040/30/09	SK Meraga Beris

=== Representation history ===
Members of the Legislative Assembly for Kijal
Assembly	No	Years	Members	Party
Constituency created from Kemasek and Bukit Bandi
7th	N30	1986–1990	Mohamed Md Min	BN (UMNO)
7th	N30	1990	Ahmad Said	BN (UMNO)
8th	N30	1990–1995	Ahmad Said	BN (UMNO)
9th	N30	1995–1999	Ahmad Said	BN (UMNO)
10th	N30	1999–2004	Mohamad Sulong	PAS
11th	N30	2004–2008	Ahmad Said	BN (UMNO)
12th	N30	2008–2013	Ahmad Said	BN (UMNO)
13th	N30	2013–2018	Ahmad Said	BN (UMNO)
14th	N30	2018–2023	Ahmad Said	BN (UMNO)
15th	N30	2023–present	Razali Idris	PN (BERSATU)

== Election results ==
Terengganu state election, 2023
Party	Candidate	Votes	%	∆%
PAS	Razali Idris	13,403	58.15	▲50.52
BN	Ahmad Said	9,645	41.85	▼7.62
Total valid votes		23,048	100.00	
Total rejected ballots		137		
Unreturned ballots		9		
Turnout		23,194	78.65	▼8.39
Registered electors		29,491		
Majority		3,758	16.30	▲9.75
PAS gain from BN		Swing		?
Source(s) Astro Awani

Terengganu state election, 2018
Party	Candidate	Votes	%	∆%
BN	Ahmad Said	9,545	49.46	▼12.94
PAS	Hazri Jusoh	8,280	42.91	▲5.31
PKR	Wan Marzuki Wan Sembok	1,472	7.63	▲7.63
Total valid votes		19,297	100.00	
Total rejected ballots		288		
Unreturned ballots		67		
Turnout		19,652	87.03	▼2.06
Registered electors		22,580		
Majority		1,265	6.56	▼18.26
BN hold		Swing		

Terengganu state election, 2013
Party	Candidate	Votes	%	∆%
BN	Ahmad Said	10,574	62.41	▲0.43
PAS	Hazri Jusoh	6,370	37.59	▼0.43
Total valid votes		16,944	100.00	
Total rejected ballots		193		
Unreturned ballots		31		
Turnout		17,168	89.10	▲3.11
Registered electors		19,269		
Majority		4,204	24.81	▲0.86
BN hold		Swing		

Terengganu state election, 2008
Party	Candidate	Votes	%	∆%
BN	Ahmad Said	8,169	61.98	▼2.03
PAS	Hazri Jusoh	5,012	38.02	▲2.03
Total valid votes		13,181	100.00	
Total rejected ballots		176		
Unreturned ballots		29		
Turnout		13,386	85.98	▼4.12
Registered electors		15,568		
Majority		3,157	23.95	▼4.07
BN hold		Swing		

Terengganu state election, 2004
Party	Candidate	Votes	%	∆%
BN	Ahmad Said	7,987	64.01	▲15.55
PAS	Mehamad Sulon	4,491	35.99	▼15.55
Total valid votes		12,478	100.00	
Total rejected ballots		142		
Unreturned ballots		142		
Turnout		12,762	90.11	▲6.10
Registered electors		14,163		
Majority		3,496	28.02	▲24.94
BN gain from PAS		Swing		-

Terengganu state election, 1999
Party	Candidate	Votes	%	∆%
PAS	Mehamad Sulon	4,425	51.54	▲10.28
BN	Ahmad Said	4,161	48.46	▼9.73
Total valid votes		8,586	100.00	
Total rejected ballots		198		
Unreturned ballots		49		
Turnout		8,833	84.00	▲0.16
Registered electors		10,515		
Majority		264	3.07	▼13.86
PAS gain from BN		Swing		-

Terengganu state election, 1995
Party	Candidate	Votes	%	∆%
BN	Ahmad Said	4,433	58.19	▼6.54
PAS	Awang @ Ibrahim Omar	3,143	41.26	▲5.99
Independent	Jamalis Awang	42	0.55	▲0.55
Total valid votes		7,618	100.00	
Total rejected ballots		174		
Unreturned ballots		6		
Turnout		7,798	83.84	▲0.27
Registered electors		9,301		
Majority		1,290	16.93	▼12.53
BN hold		Swing		

Terengganu state election, 1990
Party	Candidate	Votes	%	∆%
BN	Ahmad Said	4,029	64.73	▼0.27
PAS	Awang Dagang Jusoh	2,195	35.27	▲35.27
Total valid votes		6,224	100.00	
Total rejected ballots		142		
Unreturned ballots		2		
Turnout		6,368	83.57	▲3.06
Registered electors		7,620		
Majority		1,834	29.47	▼0.55
BN hold		Swing		

Terengganu state election, 1990
Party	Candidate	Votes	%	∆%
BN	Ahmad Said	3,658	65.01	▼2.06
S46	Ahmad Shabery Cheek	1,969	34.99	▲34.99
Total valid votes		5,627	100.00	
Total rejected ballots		86		
Unreturned ballots		0		
Turnout		5,713	80.51	▲6.05
Registered electors		7,096		
Majority		1,689	30.02	▼4.12
BN hold		Swing		

Terengganu state election, 1986
Party	Candidate	Votes	%
BN	Mohd Mohd Min	2,965	67.07
PAS	Yusoff Tahir	1,456	32.93
Total valid votes		4,421	100.00
Total rejected ballots		223	
Unreturned ballots		0	
Turnout		4,644	74.46
Registered electors		6,237	
Majority		1,509	34.13
This was a new constituency created.
