= Ru Rendang =

Political subdivision in Malaysia

Ru Rendang (N19)
Terengganu constituency

State constituency
- Legislature: Terengganu State Legislative Assembly
MLA
Ahmad Samsuri Mokhtar
PN
- Constituency created: 1984
- First contested: 1986
- Last contested: 2023

Demographics
- Electors (2023): 32,867

N19 Ru Rendang within Terengganu, as used for the 2023 state election

Ru Rendang is a state constituency in Terengganu, Malaysia, that has been represented in the Terengganu State Legislative Assembly.

The state constituency was first contested in 1986 and is mandated to return a single Assemblyman to the Terengganu State Legislative Assembly under the first-past-the-post voting system.

== Demographics ==
Ethnic breakdown of Ru Rendang's electorate as of 2018
1. Malay (99.4%)
2. Chinese (0.37%)
3. Other ethnicities (0.16%)
4. Indian (0.07%)

== History ==
=== Polling districts ===
According to the Gazette issued on 30 March 2018, the Ru Rendang constituency has a total of 11 polling districts.

State Constituency	Polling Districts	Code	Location
Ru Rendang (N19)	Rusila	037/19/01	SK Rusila
Ru Rendang (N19)	Medan Jaya	037/19/02	SMK Rusila
Ru Rendang (N19)	Sentul Patah	037/19/03	SK Sentol Patah
Ru Rendang (N19)	Marang	037/19/04	SK Marang
Ru Rendang (N19)	Bandar Marang	037/19/05	SMA Marang
Ru Rendang (N19)	Seberang Marang	037/19/06	SK Bukit Gasing
Ru Rendang (N19)	Bukit Gasing	037/19/07	SMK Seberang Marang
Ru Rendang (N19)	Batangan	037/19/08	SK Batangan
Ru Rendang (N19)	Ru Muda	037/19/09	SK Seberang Marang
Ru Rendang (N19)	Pulau Kerengga	037/19/10	SK Pulau Kerengga
Ru Rendang (N19)	Kelulut	037/19/11	SK Kelulut

=== Representation history ===
Members of the Legislative Assembly for Ru Rendang
Parliament	No	Years	Members	Party
Constituency created from Marang, Merchang and Binjai
7th	N19	1986–1990	Abdul Hadi Awang	PAS
8th	N19	1990–1995	Abdul Hadi Awang	APU (PAS)
9th	N19	1995–1999	Abdul Hadi Awang	APU (PAS)
10th	N19	1999–2004	Abdul Hadi Awang	BA (PAS)
11th	N19	2004–2008	Abdul Hadi Awang	PAS
12th	N19	2008–2013	Abdul Hadi Awang	PR (PAS)
13th	N19	2013–2018	Abdul Hadi Awang	PR (PAS)
14th	N19	2018–2020	Ahmad Samsuri Mokhtar	GS (PAS)
14th	N19	2020–2023	Ahmad Samsuri Mokhtar	PN (PAS)
15th	N19	2023–present	Ahmad Samsuri Mokhtar	PN (PAS)

== Election results ==
Terengganu state election, 2023: Ru Rendang
Party	Candidate	Votes	%	∆%
PAS	Ahmad Samsuri Mokhtar	20,927	85.18	▲23.35
PH	Suhaimi Sulaiman	3,641	14.82	▲14.82
Total valid votes		24,568	100.00	
Total rejected ballots		179		
Unreturned ballots		26		
Turnout		24,773	75.37	▼12.05
Registered electors		32,867		
Majority		17,286		
PAS hold		Swing		

Terengganu state election, 2018: Ru Rendang
Party	Candidate	Votes	%	∆%
PAS	Ahmad Samsuri Mokhtar	13,851	61.83	▲5.00
BN	Nik Dir Nik Wan Ku	7,823	34.92	▼7.94
PKR	Zarawi Sulong	729	3.25	▲3.25
Total valid votes		22,403	100.00	
Total rejected ballots		249		
Unreturned ballots		76		
Turnout		22,728	87.42	▼2.23
Registered electors		25,999		
Majority		6,028	26.91	▲12.89
PAS hold		Swing		

Terengganu state election, 2013: Ru Rendang
Party	Candidate	Votes	%	∆%
PAS	Abdul Hadi Awang	11,468	56.83	▼1.53
BN	Nik Dir Nik Wan Ku	8,649	42.86	▲1.22
Total valid votes		20,117	100.00	
Total rejected ballots		181		
Unreturned ballots		19		
Turnout		20,317	89.65	▲3.43
Registered electors		22,662		
Majority		2,819	14.01	▼2.70
PAS hold		Swing		

Terengganu state election, 2008: Ru Rendang
Party	Candidate	Votes	%	∆%
PAS	Abdul Hadi Awang	9,379	58.36	▲4.30
BN	Razali Idris	6,693	41.64	▼2.40
Total valid votes		16,072	100.00	
Total rejected ballots		137		
Unreturned ballots		0		
Turnout		16,209	86.23	▼3.15
Registered electors		18,798		
Majority		2,686	16.71	▲6.49
PAS hold		Swing		

Terengganu state election, 2004: Ru Rendang
Party	Candidate	Votes	%	∆%
PAS	Abdul Hadi Awang	7,736	54.06	▼11.96
BN	Tengku Zainuddin Tengku Zahid	6,301	44.04	▲10.21
Total valid votes		14,037	100.00	
Total rejected ballots		137		
Unreturned ballots		272		
Turnout		14,446	89.38	▲8.20
Registered electors		16,163		
Majority		1,435	10.22	▼22.02
PAS hold		Swing		

Terengganu state election, 1999: Ru Rendang
Party	Candidate	Votes	%	∆%
PAS	Abdul Hadi Awang	7,881	66.02	▲9.88
BN	Tengku Zainuddin Tengku Zahid	4,038	33.83	▼9.88
Total valid votes		11,919	100.00	
Total rejected ballots		188		
Unreturned ballots		18		
Turnout		12,125	81.17	▲0.33
Registered electors		14,937		
Majority		3,843	32.24	▲19.77
PAS hold		Swing		

Terengganu state election, 1995: Ru Rendang
Party	Candidate	Votes	%	∆%
PAS	Abdul Hadi Awang	6,285	56.24	▲1.30
BN	Bakar Seman @ Abu Bakar Othman	4,891	43.76	▼1.30
Total valid votes		11,176	100.00	
Total rejected ballots		172		
Unreturned ballots		16		
Turnout		11,364	80.85	▼2.84
Registered electors		14,056		
Majority		1,394	12.47	▲2.61
PAS hold		Swing		

Terengganu state election, 1990: Ru Rendang
Party	Candidate	Votes	%	∆%
PAS	Abdul Hadi Awang	4,750	54.93	▲0.79
BN	Abdul Latif Muda	3,897	45.07	▼0.79
Total valid votes		8,647	100.00	
Total rejected ballots		152		
Unreturned ballots		16		
Turnout		8,815	83.69	▲1.01
Registered electors		10,533		
Majority		853	9.86	▲1.58
PAS hold		Swing		

Terengganu state election, 1986: Ru Rendang
Party	Candidate	Votes	%
PAS	Abdul Hadi Awang	3,470	54.14
BN	Abdul Latif Muda	2,939	45.86
Total valid votes		6,409	100.00
Total rejected ballots		158	
Unreturned ballots		0	
Turnout		6,567	82.68
Registered electors		7,943	
Majority		531	8.29
This was a new constituency created.
