= Wisma Darul Iman =

Terengganu's state secretariat building

- Interactive map of the Wisma Darul Iman area

Record height
- Tallest in Terengganu from 1986 to 2021^{[I]}
- Surpassed by: MBKT Tower

General information
- Status: Completed
- Type: Office
- Location: Jalan Sultan Ismail, Kuala Terengganu, Malaysia
- Coordinates: 5°19′51″N 103°08′26″E
- Construction started: 1985
- Completed: 1986
- Owner: Wisma Darul Iman

Height
- Architectural: 107 m (351 ft)
- Tip: 111 m (364 ft)
- Roof: 107 m (351 ft)
- Top floor: 102 m (335 ft)

Technical details
- Structural system: Reinforced concrete
- Floor count: 20
- Floor area: 6,764 m^{2} (72,810 sq ft)

Wisma Darul Iman is Terengganu's state secretariat building, in Malaysia. It is located at Jalan Sultan Ismail in Kuala Terengganu, the state capital. It locates among the offices of Menteri Besar, State Secretary, and is home of Terengganu State Legislative Assembly. The building is second tallest structure in the state.

== See also ==
- State governments of Malaysia
