= Seberang Takir (state constituency) =

Political subdivision in Malaysia

Seberang Takir (N11)
Terengganu constituency

State constituency
- Legislature: Terengganu State Legislative Assembly
MLA
Khazan Che Mat
PN
- Constituency created: 1974
- First contested: 1974
- Last contested: 2023

Demographics
- Electors (2023): 27,733

N11 Seberang Takir within Terengganu, as used for the 2023 state election

Seberang Takir is a state constituency in Terengganu, Malaysia, that has been represented in the Terengganu State Legislative Assembly.

The state constituency was first contested in 1974 and is mandated to return a single Assemblyman to the Terengganu State Legislative Assembly under the first-past-the-post voting system.

== Demographics ==
Ethnic breakdown of Seberang Takir's electorate as of 2018
1. Malay (99.2%)
2. Other ethnicities (0.47%)
3. Chinese (0.18%)
4. Indian (0.11%)

== History ==
=== Polling districts ===
According to the Gazette issued on 30 March 2018, the Seberang Takir constituency has a total of 9 polling districts.

State Constituency	Polling Districts	Code	Location
Seberang Takir (N11)	Tok Jembal	035/11/01	SK Tok Jembal
Seberang Takir (N11)	Bukit Tok Beng	035/11/02	SK Bukit Tok Beng
Seberang Takir (N11)	Kampung Batin	035/11/03	SK Kompleks Seberang Takir
Seberang Takir (N11)	Kampung Baru Seberang Takir	035/11/04	SMK Kompleks Seberang Takir
Seberang Takir (N11)	Seberang Takir Pantai	035/11/05	SK Seberang Takir
Seberang Takir (N11)	Teluk Ketapang	035/11/06	SK Teluk Ketapang
Seberang Takir (N11)	Telaga Daing	035/11/07	SMK Ibrahim Fikri
Seberang Takir (N11)	Telaga Batin	035/11/08	Kem Pengakap Tengku Muhammad Ismail
Seberang Takir (N11)	Kubang Badak	035/11/09	Dewan Serbaguna Tok Jemal

=== Representation history ===
Members of the Legislative Assembly for Seberang Takir
Assembly	No	Years	Members	Party
Constituency created from Kuala Nerus and Batu Rakit
4th	N08	1974–1978	Abdul Rashid Ngah	BN (UMNO)
5th	N08	1978–1982	Abdul Rashid Ngah	BN (UMNO)
6th	N08	1982–1986	Abdul Rashid Ngah	BN (UMNO)
7th	N11	1986–1990	Abdul Rashid Ngah	BN (UMNO)
8th	N11	1990–1995	Abdul Rashid Ngah	BN (UMNO)
9th	N11	1995–1999	Abdul Rashid Ngah	BN (UMNO)
10th	N11	1999–2004	Abdul Rashid Ngah	BN (UMNO)
11th	N11	2004–2008	Mohd Shapian Ali	BN (UMNO)
12th	N11	2008–2013	Ahmad Razif Abdul Rahman	BN (UMNO)
13th	N11	2013–2018	Ahmad Razif Abdul Rahman	BN (UMNO)
14th	N11	2018–2023	Ahmad Razif Abdul Rahman	BN (UMNO)
15th	N11	2023–present	Khazan Che Mat	PN (BERSATU)

== Election results ==
Terengganu state election, 2023
Party	Candidate	Votes	%	∆%
PAS	Khazan Che Mat	12,156	56.65	▲14.60
BN	Ahmad Razif Abdul Rahman	9,359	43.35	▼9.31
Total valid votes		21,515	100.00	
Total rejected ballots		121		
Unreturned ballots		19		
Turnout		21,655	78.08	▼9.22
Registered electors		27,733		
Majority		2,797	13.30	▲2.69
PAS gain from BN		Swing		?

Terengganu state election, 2018
Party	Candidate	Votes	%	∆%
BN	Ahmad Razif Abdul Rahman	9,340	52.66	▼2.18
PAS	Mohd Fazil Wahab	7,456	42.05	▼2.08
PKR	Abu Bakar Abdullah	939	5.29	▲4.77
Total valid votes		17,735	100.00	
Total rejected ballots		148		
Unreturned ballots		113		
Turnout		17,996	87.33	▼0.62
Registered electors		20,607		
Majority		1,884	10.62	▼0.14
BN hold		Swing		

Terengganu state election, 2013
Party	Candidate	Votes	%	∆%
BN	Ahmad Razif Abdul Rahman	7,731	54.84	▼6.40
PAS	Zakaria Dagang	6,221	44.13	▲44.13
PKR	Ahmad Nazri Mohd Yusoff	73	0.52	▲0.52
Total valid votes		14,025	100.00	
Total rejected ballots		204		
Unreturned ballots		30		
Turnout		14,259	87.95	▲3.89
Registered electors		16,212		
Majority		1,510	10.77	▼12.49
BN hold		Swing		

Terengganu state election, 2008
Party	Candidate	Votes	%	∆%
BN	Ahmad Razif Abdul Rahman	6,440	61.24	▲0.97
PKR	Muzafeq Assyulzaifuzan Muhammad	4,010	38.13	▲38.13
Total valid votes		10,450	100.00	
Total rejected ballots		202		
Unreturned ballots		66		
Turnout		10,718	84.06	▼4.77
Registered electors		12,750		
Majority		2,430	23.25	▲2.72
BN hold		Swing		

Terengganu state election, 2004
Party	Candidate	Votes	%	∆%
BN	Mohd Shapian Ali	5,811	60.27	▲6.53
PAS	Zakaria Dagang	3,831	39.73	▼6.53
Total valid votes		9,642	100.00	
Total rejected ballots		145		
Unreturned ballots		86		
Turnout		9,873	88.83	▲2.53
Registered electors		11,114		
Majority		1,980	20.54	▲13.07
BN hold		Swing		

Terengganu state election, 1999
Party	Candidate	Votes	%	∆%
BN	Abdul Rashid Ngah	4,009	53.73	▼17.39
PAS	Zakaria Dagang	3,452	46.27	▲46.27
Total valid votes		7,461	100.00	
Total rejected ballots		197		
Unreturned ballots		338		
Turnout		7,996	86.30	▲2.33
Registered electors		9,265		
Majority		557	7.47	▼34.78
BN hold		Swing		

Terengganu state election, 1995
Party	Candidate	Votes	%	∆%
BN	Abdul Rashid Ngah	5,158	71.13	▲0.94
PAS	Ibrahim Azmi Hassan	2,094	28.87	▼0.94
Total valid votes		7,252	100.00	
Total rejected ballots		288		
Unreturned ballots		264		
Turnout		7,804	83.98	▲2.20
Registered electors		9,293		
Majority		3,064	42.25	▲1.88
BN hold		Swing		

Terengganu state election, 1990
Party	Candidate	Votes	%	∆%
BN	Abdul Rashid Ngah	4,925	70.19	▼4.24
PAS	Yong Mahmud	2,092	29.81	▲29.81
Total valid votes		7,017	100.00	
Total rejected ballots		233		
Unreturned ballots		0		
Turnout		7,250	81.77	▲5.56
Registered electors		8,866		
Majority		2,833	40.37	▼8.49
BN hold		Swing		

Terengganu state election, 1986
Party	Candidate	Votes	%	∆%
BN	Abdul Rashid Ngah	3,796	74.43	▲4.75
PAS	Awang Abu Bakar	1,304	25.57	▼4.75
Total valid votes		5,100	100.00	
Total rejected ballots		163		
Unreturned ballots		0		
Turnout		5,263	76.21	▼0.13
Registered electors		6,906		
Majority		2,492	48.86	▲9.51
BN hold		Swing		

Terengganu state election, 1982
Party	Candidate	Votes	%	∆%
BN	Abdul Rashid Ngah	4,660	69.68	▲7.92
PAS	Fadzullah Shuib	2,028	30.32	▼7.92
Total valid votes		6,688	100.00	
Total rejected ballots		160		
Unreturned ballots		0		
Turnout		6,848	76.34	▲3.70
Registered electors		8,970		
Majority		2,632	39.35	▲15.83
BN hold		Swing		

Terengganu state election, 1978
Party	Candidate	Votes	%	∆%
BN	Abdul Rashid Ngah	3,219	61.76	▲5.32
PAS	Ahmad Yusof Assyddieqy	1,993	38.24	▲38.24
Total valid votes		5,212	100.00	
Total rejected ballots		269		
Unreturned ballots		0		
Turnout		5,481	72.64	▲2.26
Registered electors		7,545		
Majority		1,226	23.52	▲10.63
BN hold		Swing		

Terengganu state election, 1974
Party	Candidate	Votes	%
BN	Abdul Rashid Ngah	2,465	56.45
Parti Sosialis Rakyat Malaysia	Mohd. Napis Mohamad	1,902	43.55
Total valid votes		4,367	100.00
Total rejected ballots		253	
Unreturned ballots		0	
Turnout		4,620	70.38
Registered electors		6,564	
Majority		563	12.89
This was a new constituency created.
