= Terengganu State Executive Council =

- 2023–present
- Date formed: 15 August 2023

People and organisations
- Head of state: Mizan Zainal Abidin
- Menteri Besar: Ahmad Samsuri Mokhtar (PN–PAS)
- Total no. of members: 11
- Member parties: Perikatan Nasional (PN): PAS; BERSATU
- Status in legislature: Coalition government 32 / 32

History
- Election: 2023 Terengganu state election
- Legislature term: 15th

The Terengganu State Executive Council is the executive authority of the Government of Terengganu, Malaysia. The Council comprises the Menteri Besar, appointed by the Sultan on the basis that he is able to command a majority in the Terengganu State Legislative Assembly, a number of members made up of members of the Assembly, the State Secretary, the State Legal Adviser and the State Financial Officer.

This Council is similar in structure and role to the Cabinet of Malaysia, while being smaller in size. As federal and state responsibilities differ, there are a number of portfolios that differ between the federal and state governments.

Members of the Council are selected by the Menteri Besar, appointed by the Sultan. The Council has no ministry, but instead a number of committees; each committee will take care of certain state affairs, activities and departments. Members of the Council are always the chair of a committee.

== Lists of full members ==
=== Ahmad Samsuri II EXCO (since 2023) ===
==== Members ====
PN (11)
- PAS (10)
- BERSATU (1)

Members of the Council, since 15 August 2023, are:

Name	Portfolio	Party	Constituency	Term start
Ahmad Samsuri Mokhtar (Menteri Besar)	Economy; Finance; Investment; Land; Natural Resources	PAS	Ru Rendang	15 August 2023
Satiful Bahri Mamat	Education; Higher Education; Science and Technology; Human Capital	PAS	Paka	15 August 2023
Azman Ibrahim	Plantation; Agriculture; Food Security; Commodities	PAS	Jabi	15 August 2023
Wan Sukairi Wan Abdullah	Health; Local Government; Housing	PAS	Wakaf Mempelam	15 August 2023
Ariffin Deraman	Entrepreneur Development; Human Resources; Co-operation; Consumer Affairs	PAS	Alur Limbat	15 August 2023
Hanafiah Mat	Infrastructure; Utility; Rural Development	PAS	Cukai	15 August 2023
Mohd Nurkhuzaini Ab Rahman	Digital Economy; New Income; Trade; Industry; Investment	PAS	Kota Putera	15 August 2023
Muhammad Khalil Abdul Hadi	Information; Dakwah; Syariah Implementation	PAS	Batu Buruk	15 August 2023
Maliaman Kassim	Women and Family Development; Welfare; National Unity	PAS	Ajil	15 August 2023
Hishamuddin Abdul Karim	Youth; Sports; Non-government Organisation (NGO)	PAS	Tepuh	15 August 2023
Razali Idris	Tourism; Culture; Environment; Climate Change	BERSATU	Kijal	15 August 2023

==== Deputy Members ====
PN (11)
- PAS (8)
- BERSATU (3)

Deputy Members of the Council, since 15 August 2023, are:

Name	Portfolio	Party	Constituency	Term start
Mamad Puteh	Economy; Finance; Investment; Land; Natural Resources	PAS	Kuala Berang	15 August 2023
Ahmad Shah Muhamed	Education; Higher Education; Science and Technology; Human Capital	PAS	Bandar	15 August 2023
Hilmi Harun	Plantation; Agriculture; Food Security; Commodities	PAS	Manir	15 August 2023
Saiful Azmi Suhaili	Health; Local Government; Housing	PAS	Kemasik	15 August 2023
Ridzuan Hashim	Information; Dakwah; Syariah Implementation	PAS	Buluh Gading	15 August 2023
Zuraida Md Noor	Women and Family Development; Welfare; National Unity	PAS	Ladang	15 August 2023
Mohd Fadhli Rahmi Zulkifli	Youth; Sports; Non-government Organisation (NGO)	PAS	Rantau Abang	15 August 2023
Sulaiman Sulong	Tourism; Culture; Environment; Climate Change	PAS	Pengkalan Berangan	15 August 2023
Mohd Husaimi Hussin	Digital Economy; New Income; Trade; Industry; Investment	BERSATU	Hulu Besut	15 August 2023
Mohd Yusop Majid	Entrepreneur Development; Human Resources; Co-operation; Consumer Affairs	BERSATU	Permaisuri	15 August 2023
Mohd Zawawi Ismail	Infrastructure; Utility; Rural Development	BERSATU	Telemung	15 August 2023

== Former members ==
=== Ahmad Samsuri I EXCO (2018-2023) ===
==== Members ====
PN (11)
- PAS (11)

Members from 10 May 2018 to 15 August 2023 were :

Name	Portfolio	Party	Constituency	Term start	Term end
Ahmad Samsuri Mokhtar (Menteri Besar)	Planning; Finance; Investment; Land and Natural Resources	PAS	Ru Rendang	10 May 2018	15 August 2023
Satiful Bahri Mamat	Syariah Implementation; Education; Higher Education	PAS	Paka	16 May 2018	15 August 2023
Alias Razak MP	Local Government and Housing; Health; Environment	PAS	Bukit Tunggal	16 May 2018	15 August 2023
Mohd. Nor Hamzah	Human Development; Dakwah; Information	PAS	Bukit Payung	16 May 2018	15 August 2023
Azman Ibrahim	Agriculture and Agro-based Industry; Rural Development	PAS	Jabi	16 May 2018	15 August 2023
Tengku Hassan Tengku Omar	Trade and Industry; Regional Development; Good Governance	PAS	Ladang	16 May 2018	15 August 2023
Ariffin Deraman	Tourism and Culture; Information Technology	PAS	Alur Limbat	16 May 2018	15 August 2023
Hanafiah Mat	Welfare; Women and Family Development; National Unity	PAS	Cukai	16 May 2018	15 August 2023
Wan Sukairi Wan Abdullah	Youth and Sports; Non-governmental Organisations	PAS	Wakaf Mempelam	16 May 2018	15 August 2023
Mamad Puteh	Infrastructure; Public Facilities; Utilities; Green Technology	PAS	Kuala Berang	16 May 2018	15 August 2023
Mohd Nurkhuzaini Ab Rahman	Entrepreneurship; Micro Industry; Hawkers' Affairs	PAS	Kota Putera	16 May 2018	15 August 2023

==== Deputy Members ====
PN (11)
- PAS (11)

Deputy Members from 16 May 2018 to 15 August 2023 were :

Name	Portfolio	Party	Constituency	Term start	Term end
Maliaman Kassim	Syariah Implementation; Education; Higher Education	PAS	Ajil	16 May 2018	15 August 2023
Ahmad Shah Muhamed	Local Government and Housing; Health; Environment	PAS	Bandar		15 August 2023
Ridzuan Hashim	Human Development; Dakwah; Information	PAS	Buluh Gading		15 August 2023
Hilmi Harun	Agriculture and Agro-based Industry; Rural Development	PAS	Manir		15 August 2023
Muhammad Khalil Abdul Hadi	Trade and Industry; Regional Development; Good Governance	PAS	Batu Buruk		15 August 2023
Sulaiman Sulong	Tourism and Culture; Information Technology	PAS	Pengkalan Berangan		15 August 2023
Abdul Razak Ibrahim	Tourism and Culture; Information Technology	PAS	Air Putih		15 August 2023
Alias Harun	Welfare; Women and Family Development; National Unity	PAS	Rantau Abang		15 August 2023
Hishamuddin Abdul Karim	Youth and Sports; Non-governmental Organisations	PAS	Tepuh		15 August 2023
Saiful Azmi Suhaili	Infrastructure; Public Facilities; Utilities; Green Technology	PAS	Kemasik		15 August 2023
Wan Hapandi Wan Nik	Entrepreneurship; Micro Industry; Hawkers' Affairs	PAS	Sura		15 August 2023

=== Razif EXCO (2014–2018) ===
BN (10)
- UMNO (10)

Name	Portfolio	Party	Constituency	Term start	Term end
Ahmad Razif Abdul Rahman (Menteri Besar)	Planning; Finance; Land and Natural Resources; Investment, Industry and Economy; Tourism and Culture	UMNO	Seberang Takir	2014	2018
Mohd Jidin Shafee	Housing; Local Government	UMNO	Permaisuri	2014	2018
Nawi Mohamad	Rural Development; Entrepreneurship; Cooperative Development; Domestic Trade	UMNO	Hulu Beust	2014	2018
Abdul Latiff Awang	Education; Science and Technology; State Transformation	UMNO	Pengkalan Berangan	2014	2018
Roslee Daud	Health; Women, Family and Community Development	UMNO	Bukit Besi	2014	2018
Ghazali Taib	Communication and Multimedia; Special Affairs	UMNO	Ajil	2014	2018
Muhammad Pehimi Yusof	Agriculture and Agro-based Industry; Plantation and Commodities	UMNO	Kota Putera	2014	2018
Tengku Putera Tengku Awang	Trade; Industry	UMNO	Kuala Berang	2014	2018
Rozi Mamat	Youth and Sports; Human Resources	UMNO	Temelung	2014	2018
Rosli Othman	Infrastructure; Public Facilities; Energy; Green Technology	UMNO	Kemasik	2014	2018

=== Ahmad Said II EXCO (2013–2014) ===
BN (10)
- UMNO (10)

Name	Portfolio	Party	Constituency	Term start	Term end
Ahmad Said (Menteri Besar)	Planning; Finance; Land and Natural Resources; Housing and Local Government; Environment	UMNO	Kijal	21 May 2013	2014
Mohd Jidin Shafee	Tourism and Culture	UMNO	Permaisuri	21 May 2013	2014
Ahmad Razif Abdul Rahman	Science and Technology; Energy; Green Technology; Water	UMNO	Seberang Takir	21 May 2013	2014
Nawi Mohamad	Rural Development; Entrepreneurship; Cooperative Development; Domestic Trade	UMNO	Hulu Beust	21 May 2013	2014
Abdul Latiff Awang	Communication and Multimedia; State Transformation	UMNO	Pengkalan Berangan	21 May 2013	2014
Roslee Daud	Health; Women, Family and Community Development	UMNO	Bukit Besi	21 May 2013	2014
Ghazali Taib	Education; Higher Education; Special Affairs	UMNO	Ajil	21 May 2013	2014
Tengku Putera Tengku Awang	Trade; Industry	UMNO	Kuala Berang	21 May 2013	2014
Rozi Mamat	Youth and Sports; Human Resources	UMNO	Temelung	21 May 2013	2014
Rosli Othman	Infrastructure; Public Facilities	UMNO	Kemasik	21 May 2013	2014
Abdul Rahman Mokhtar	Health; National Unity; Consumer Affairs	UMNO	Kuala Besut	21 May 2013	26 June 2013
Muhammad Pehimi Yusof	Agriculture and Agro-based Industry; Plantation and Commodities	UMNO	Kota Putera	21 November 2013	2014

=== Ahmad Said I EXCO (2008–2013) ===
UMNO (10) MCA (1)

Name	Portfolio	Party	Constituency	Term start	Term end
Ahmad Said (Menteri Besar)		UMNO	Kijal	2008	2013
Mohamed Awang Tera		UMNO		2008	2013
Abdul Rahin Mohd Said		UMNO		2008	2013
Toh Chin Yaw		MCA	Bandar	2008	2013
Ahmad Razif Abdul Rahman		UMNO	Seberang Takir	2008	2013
Khazan Che Mat		UMNO	Batu Rakit	2008	2013
Yahaya Khatib Mohamad		UMNO		2008	2013
Ashaari Idris		UMNO		2008	2013
Za’abar Mohd Adib		UMNO		2008	2013
Rozi Mamat	Agriculture and Agro-Based Industry (2008–2010); Youth and Sports (2010–2013)	UMNO	Telemung	2008	2013
A Rahman Mokhtar		UMNO		2008	2013

=== Idris Jusoh EXCO (2004–2008) ===
UMNO (10) MCA (1)

Name	Portfolio	Party	Constituency	Term start	Term end
Idris Jusoh (Menteri Besar)		UMNO	Jertih	2004	2008
Mohamed Awang Tera	Industry Development; Tourism	UMNO		2004	2008
Abdul Rahin Mohd Said	Entrepreneur Development; Small and Medium Industries (SMEs); Small Traders	UMNO		2004	2008
Toh Chin Yaw		MCA		2004	2008
Din Adam	Youth Culture, Sports; Non-Governmental Organisation (NGO)	UMNO		2004	2008
Wan Hisham Wan Salleh	Infrastructure Development; Public Facilities; Communications	UMNO		2004	2008
Wan Mohd Wan Hassan		UMNO		2004	2008
Ahmad Said		UMNO		2004	2008
Abdul Latif Awang	Education; Higher Education; Science and Technologi; Human Resources	UMNO		2004	2008
Mohd Jidin Shafee	Agriculture; Regional Development	UMNO		2004	2008
Rosol Wahid	Hadhari Islamic Development; Welfare	UMNO		2004	2008

=== Abdul Hadi Awang EXCO (1999–2004) ===
PAS (11)

Name	Portfolio	Party	Constituency	Term start	Term end
Abdul Hadi Awang (Menteri Besar)	Economic Planning; Land; Mining; Forestry; Finance	PAS	Ru Rendang	1999	2004
Mustafa Ali	Economic Development; Petroleum; Industry; Human Resources	PAS	Pengkalan Berangan	1999	2004
Harun Taib	Education; Dakwah; Syariah Implementation	PAS	Manir	1999	2004
Wan Abdul Mutalib Embong	Local Government; Housing; Environment; Public Administration	PAS	Batu Buruk	1999	2004
Abu Bakar Chik	Agriculture; Rural Development	PAS	Batu Rakit	1999	2004
Mohd Salleh Abas	Hisbah; Special Duties	PAS	Jertih	1999	2004
Yahaya Ali	Infrastructure Development; Public Facilities	PAS	Alur Limbat	1999	2004
Mohd Abdul Wahid Endut	Entrepreneur Development; Youth; Small Traders; Consumer Affairs	PAS	Wakaf Mempelam	1999	2004
Abu Bakar Abdullah	Social Welfare; Health	PAS	Tepuh	1999	2004
Awang Jusoh	Women's Affairs; Race Relations	PAS	Cukai	1999	2004
Wan Hassan Mohd Ramli	Culture; Tourism	PAS	Sura	1999	2004

== Ex officio members ==
Position	Office bearer
State Secretary	Zulkifli Ali
State Legal Advisor	Mohd Nawawi Ismail
State Financial Officer	Mohd Azmi Mohamad Daham

== See also ==
- Sultan of Terengganu
- Menteri Besar of Terengganu
- Terengganu State Legislative Assembly
