= Ab Razak Ibrahim =

Malaysian politician

Haji Ab Razak Ibrahim AMT
- عبدالرازق بن إبراهيم

Deputy Member of the Terengganu State Executive Council (Tourism, Culture and Information Technology)
- In office 16 May 2018 – 15 August 2023 Serving with Sulaiman Sulong
- Monarch: Mizan Zainal Abidin
- Menteri Besar: Ahmad Samsuri Mokhtar
- Member: Ariffin Deraman
- Constituency: Air Putih

Member of the Terengganu State Legislative Assembly for Air Putih
- In office 9 May 2018 – 12 August 2023
- Preceded by: Wan Abdul Hakim Wan Mokhtar (BN–UMNO)
- Succeeded by: Mohd Hafiz Adam (PN–PAS)
- Majority: 746 (2018)

Faction represented in Terengganu State Legislative Assembly
- 2018–2020: Malaysian Islamic Party
- 2020–2023: Perikatan Nasional

Personal details
- Born: Ab Razak bin Ibrahim; 26 April 1954 (age 71) Terengganu, Malaysia
- Citizenship: Malaysian
- Party: Malaysian Islamic Party (PAS)
- Other political affiliations: Perikatan Nasional (PN); Muafakat Nasional (MN); Gagasan Sejahtera (GS); Pakatan Rakyat (PR)
- Occupation: Politician

Ab Razak bin Ibrahim (born 26 April 1954) is a Malaysian politician who served as Deputy Member of the Terengganu State Executive Council (EXCO) in the Perikatan Nasional (PN) state administration under Menteri Besar Ahmad Samsuri Mokhtar and Member Ariffin Deraman as well as Member of the Terengganu State Legislative Assembly (MLA) for Air Putih from May 2018 to August 2023. He is a member of the Malaysian Islamic Party (PAS), a component party of the PN coalition.

== Political career ==
=== Member of the Terengganu State Legislative Assembly (2018–2023) ===
In the 2018 Terengganu state election, Ab Razak was renominated by PAS to contest for the Air Putih seat. He won the seat and was elected as the Air Putih MLA for the first term. Ab Razak was not nominated to contest in the 2023 Terengganu state election.

=== Deputy Member of the Terengganu State Executive Council (2018–2023) ===
On 16 May 2018 after PAS took over the state administration from BN after PAS defeated BN in the 2018 state election, Ab Razak was appointed as Terengganu Deputy EXCO Member in charge of Tourism, Culture and Information Technology alongside another Deputy EXCO Member Sulaiman Sulong by Menteri Besar Ahmad Samsuri to deputise for EXCO Member Ariffin. Ab Razak stepped down from his position following the reappointment of Ahmad Samsuri as the Menteri Besar and formation of the new Terengganu state administration on 15 August 2023.

== Election results ==
Terengganu State Legislative Assembly
Year	Constituency		Votes	Pct	Opponent(s)	Votes	Pct	Ballots cast	Majority	Turnout
2013	N32 Air Putih	Ab Razak Ibrahim (PAS)	9,890	42.24%	Wan Abdul Hakim Wan Mokhtar (UMNO)	13,523	57.76%	23,730	3,633	87.80%
2018	N32 Air Putih	Ab Razak Ibrahim (PAS)	12,985	47.35%	Wan Abdul Hakim Wan Mokhtar (UMNO)	12,239	46.64%	27,419	746	84.35%
2018	N32 Air Putih	Ab Razak Ibrahim (PAS)	12,985	47.35%	Mohd Zukri Aksah (PKR)	2,195	8.01%	27,419	746	84.35%

== Honours ==
- Terengganu
  - Member of the Order of the Crown of Terengganu (AMT) (2023)
