= Razali Idris =

Malaysian politician

Yang Berhormat Dato' Razali Idris DPMT DPSM MLA
- غزالي إدريس

Member of the Terengganu State Executive Council (Tourism, Culture, Environment and Climate Change: since 16 August 2023)
- Incumbent
- Assumed office 15 August 2023
- Monarch: Mizan Zainal Abidin
- Menteri Besar: Ahmad Samsuri Mokhtar
- Deputy: Sulaiman Sulong
- Preceded by: Ariffin Deraman (Tourism & Culture); Alias Razak (Environment); Portfolio established (Climate Change)
- Constituency: Kijal

Member of the Terengganu State Legislative Assembly for Kijal
- Incumbent
- Assumed office 12 August 2023
- Preceded by: Ahmad Said (BN–UMNO)
- Majority: 3,758 (2023)

Senator Appointed by the Yang di-Pertuan Agong
- In office 27 August 2018 – 26 August 2024
- Monarchs: Muhammad V (2018–2019); Abdullah (2019–2024); Ibrahim (January–August 2024)
- Prime Minister: Mahathir Mohamad (2018–2020); Muhyiddin Yassin (2020–2021); Ismail Sabri Yaakob (2021–2022); Anwar Ibrahim (2022–2024)

4th Information Chief of the Malaysian United Indigenous Party
- In office 2 March 2023 – 28 November 2024
- President: Muhyiddin Yassin
- Preceded by: Wan Saiful Wan Jan
- Succeeded by: Tun Faisal Ismail Aziz

Personal details
- Born: Razali bin Idris; 15 July 1966 (age 60) Malaysia
- Citizenship: Malaysia
- Party: United Malays National Organisation (UMNO) (until 2016); Malaysian United Indigenous Party (BERSATU) (since 2016)
- Other political affiliations: Barisan Nasional (BN) (until 2016); Pakatan Harapan (PH) (2017–2020); Perikatan Nasional (PN) (since 2020)
- Spouse: Nor Aziam Abu Bakar
- Children: Aisyah Hanin Haqqim; Mohd Alinur Haqqim
- Occupation: Politician
- Razali Idris on Facebook

Razali bin Idris (born 15 July 1966) is a Malaysian politician who has served as Member of the Terengganu State Executive Council (EXCO) in the Perikatan Nasional (PN) state administration under Menteri Besar Ahmad Samsuri Mokhtar and Member of the Terengganu State Legislative Assembly (MLA) for Kijal since August 2023. He served as a Senator from August 2018 to August 2024. He is a member, the Division Chief of Marang and formerly the State Chairman of Terengganu of the Malaysian United Indigenous Party (BERSATU), a component party of the PN and formerly Pakatan Harapan (PH) coalitions and previously a member of the United Malays National Organisation (UMNO), a component party of the Barisan Nasional (BN) coalition. He served as the 4th Information Chief of BERSATU from March 2023 to November 2024. He is also presently the sole BERSATU Terengganu EXCO Member.

== Election results ==
Parliament of Malaysia
Year	Constituency	Candidate	Votes	Pct	Opponent(s)	Votes	Pct	Ballots cast	Majority	Turnout
2018	P038 Hulu Terengganu	Razali Idris (BERSATU)	3,364	5.40%	Rosol Wahid (UMNO)	30,925	49.60%	63,428	2,868	86.31%
2018	P038 Hulu Terengganu	Razali Idris (BERSATU)	3,364	5.40%	Muhyidin Abdul Rashid (PAS)	28,057	45.00%	63,428	2,868	86.31%

Terengganu State Legislative Assembly
Year	Constituency	Candidate	Votes	Pct	Opponent(s)	Votes	Pct	Ballots cast	Majority	Turnout
2008	N19 Ru Rendang	Razali Idris (UMNO)	6,693	41.64%	Abdul Hadi Awang (PAS)	9,379	58.36%	16,209	2,686	86.23%
2023	N30 Kijal	Razali Idris (BERSATU)	13,403	58.15%	Ahmad Said (UMNO)	9,645	41.85%	23,048	3,758	78.15%

== Honours ==
- Malacca
  - Companion Class II of the Exalted Order of Malacca (DPSM) – Datuk (2011)
- Terengganu
  - Knight Commander of the Order of the Crown of Terengganu (DPMT) – Dato' (2026)
