= Sabri Mohd Noor =

Malaysian politician

Yang Berbahagia Dato' Sabri Mohd Noor DIMP PPN
- صبري محمّد نور

Member of the Terengganu State Legislative Assembly for Langkap
- In office 5 May 2013 – 12 August 2023
- Preceded by: Asha'ari Idris (BN–UMNO)
- Succeeded by: Azmi Maarof (PN–PAS)
- Majority: 3,022 (2013); 3,446 (2018)

Personal details
- Party: United Malays National Organisation (UMNO)
- Other political affiliations: Barisan Nasional (BN)
- Spouse: Rohasidah Abas
- Children: 3
- Occupation: Politician

Sabri bin Mohd Noor is a Malaysian politician who was a member of the Terengganu State Legislative Assembly for Langkap seat from 2013 to August 2023. He is a member and the Division Chief of Setiu of the United Malays National Organisation (UMNO), a component party of the Barisan Nasional (BN) coalition.

== Election results ==
Terengganu State Legislative Assembly
Year	Constituency	Candidate	Votes	Pct	Opponent(s)	Votes	Pct	Ballots cast	Majority	Turnout
2013	N07 Langkap	Sabri Mohd Noor (UMNO)	8,425	60.93%	Hassan Karim (PAS)	5,403	39.07%	14,018	3,022	84.47%
2018	N07 Langkap	Sabri Mohd Noor (UMNO)	9,007	59.45%	Azmi Maarof (PAS)	5,561	36.70%	15,513	3,446	84.79%
2018	N07 Langkap	Sabri Mohd Noor (UMNO)	9,007	59.45%	Mustaffa Abdullah (PPBM)	583	3.85%	15,513	3,446	84.79%
2023	N07 Langkap	Sabri Mohd Noor (UMNO)	6,819	41.65%	Azmi Maarof (PAS)	9,553	58.35%	16,468	2,734	73.39%

== Honours ==
- Malaysia
  - Medal of the Order of the Defender of the Realm (PPN) (2006)
- Pahang
  - Knight Companion of the Order of the Crown of Pahang (DIMP) – Dato' (2011)
