= 2023 Terengganu state election =

Malaysian state legislative election

- 12 August 2023

All 32 elected seats in the Terengganu State Legislative Assembly 17 seats needed for a majority
- Turnout: 74.79%
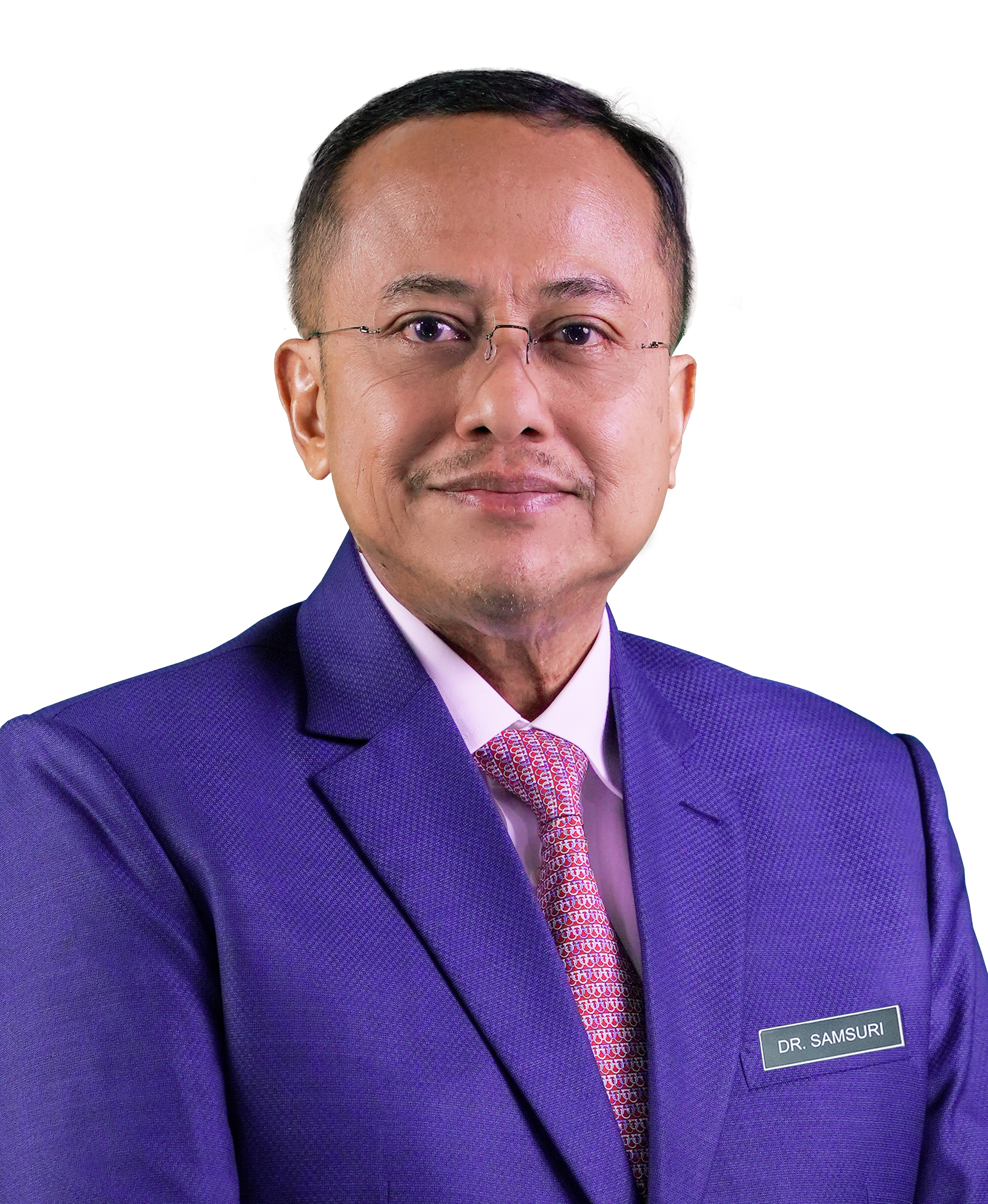
	Majority party	Minority party
		PH-BN
Leader	Ahmad Samsuri Mokhtar	Ahmad Said; Raja Kamarul Bahrin
Party	PAS	UMNO; AMANAH
Alliance	Perikatan Nasional Parties: PAS; BERSATU	Barisan Nasional; Pakatan Harapan Parties: UMNO; PKR; AMANAH
Leader since	5 January 2021	11 January 2019; 30 August 2017
Leader's seat	Ru Rendang	Ahmad: Contested in Kijal (defeated); Raja Kamarul Bahrin: Did not contest
Last election	22 seats, 52.34% (Note: New coalition formed in 2020. These numbers are the total seats and vote share of BERSATU, PAS and GERAKAN in the last election. The parties were previously part of Pakatan Harapan, Gagasan Sejahtera and Barisan Nasional.)	10 seats, 47.54% (Note: Cooperation between PH and BN with 10 seats)
Seats before	22	10
Seats won	32	0
Seat change	▲10	▼10
Popular vote	473,027	217,188
Percentage	68.48%	31.44%
Swing	▲16.14%	▼16.10%
Menteri Besar of Terengganu before election
Ahmad Samsuri Mokhtar
PN (PAS)
Menteri Besar of Terengganu after election
Ahmad Samsuri Mokhtar
PN (PAS)

The 15th Terengganu state election were held on 12 August 2023 to elect the State Assembly members of the 15th Terengganu State Legislative Assembly, the legislature of the Malaysian state of Terengganu.

Terengganu is one of the states which did not dissolve simultaneously with Dewan Rakyat on 10 October 2022. It was decided by Perikatan Nasional on 13 October 2022.

The Perikatan Nasional (PN) coalition led by Parti Islam Se-Malaysia (PAS) won all 32 seats, recording the first clean sweep in the state's history since 1978. Other candidates, including the Barisan Nasional (BN) – Pakatan Harapan (PH) electoral pact did not win any seats, with BN losing all its previous 10 seats, leaving the state assembly with no elected opposition representative.

The 2023 Kuala Terengganu by-election was held concurrently with this election.

== Demographics ==
Ethnic breakdown of Terengganu state's electorate as of 2023
1. Malay (97.2%)
2. Chinese (2.40%)
3. Indian (0.30%)
4. Other ethnicities (0.10%)

== Background ==
For the state elections, Perikatan Nasional has decided to use the PAS logo and name for all its candidate in Kelantan and Terengganu, regardless of the candidate party.

== Constituencies ==
All 32 constituencies within Terengganu, which constitute the Terengganu State Legislative Assembly, were contested during the election.

Electoral map of Terengganu, showing all 32 constituencies

Breakdown of 2022 Malaysian general election result by state constituency in 2022, where PH in Red, PN in Blue-green and BN in blue

== Composition before dissolution ==
Government	Opposition
PN	BN
22	10
22	10
PAS	UMNO

Note: 1 seat is ADUN Lantikan (Nominated MLA) which is not contested in this election.

== Timeline ==
The key dates are listed below.

Date	Event
13 October 2022	Perikatan Nasional decides not to dissolve the 14th Terengganu State Legislative Assembly.
28 June 2023	Dissolution of Terengganu State Legislative Assembly.
5 July 2023	Issue of the Writ of Election
29 July 2023	Nomination Day
29 July–11 August 2023	Campaigning Period
8–11 August 2023	Early Polling Day For Postal, Overseas and Advance Voters
12 August 2023	Polling Day

== Retiring incumbent(s) ==
The following members of the 14th State Legislative Assembly did not contest this election.

No.	State Constituency	Departing MLA	Coalition (Party)	Date confirmed	First elected	Reason
N6	Permaisuri	Abd Halim Jusoh	BN (UMNO)	21 July 2023	2013	Dropped by party.
N25	Bukit Besi	Roslee Daud	BN (UMNO)	21 July 2023	2013	Dropped by party.
N12	Bukit Tunggal	Alias Razak	PN (PAS)	27 July 2023	1999	Not contesting state election (MP for Kuala Nerus).
N15	Ladang	Tengku Hassan Tengku Omar	PN (PAS)	27 July 2023	2013	Dropped by party.
N26	Rantau Abang	Alias Harun	PN (PAS)	27 July 2023	2013	Dropped by party.
N27	Sura	Wan Hapandi Wan Nik	PN (PAS)	27 July 2023	2013	Dropped by party.
N32	Air Putih	Ab Razak Ibrahim	PN (PAS)	27 July 2023	2018	Dropped by party.

== Electoral candidates ==
Names in bold are the confirmed winners in the 2023 state election.

No.	Parliamentary Constituency	No.	State Constituency	Voters	Incumbent State Assemblymen	Coalition (Party)	Political coalitions and parties							
No.	Parliamentary Constituency	No.	State Constituency	Voters	Incumbent State Assemblymen	Coalition (Party)	Barisan Nasional + Pakatan Harapan		Perikatan Nasional		MUDA + PSM electoral pact		Other parties/Independents	
No.	Parliamentary Constituency	No.	State Constituency	Voters	Incumbent State Assemblymen	Coalition (Party)	Candidate name	Party	Candidate name	Party	Candidate name	Party	Candidate name	Party
P033	Besut	N01	Kuala Besut	26,992	Tengku Zaihan Che Ku Abd Rahman	**BN** (**UMNO**)	Tengku Zaihan Che Ku Abd Rahman	UMNO	Azbi Salleh	PAS				
P033	Besut	N02	Kota Putera	32,792	Mohd Nurkhuzaini Ab Rahman	**PN** (**PAS**)	Muhammad Pehimi Yusoff	UMNO	Mohd Nurkhuzaini Ab Rahman	PAS				
P033	Besut	N03	Jertih	29,088	Muhammad Pehimi Yusof	**BN** (**UMNO**)	Mohd Rozaini Rasli	UMNO	Riduan Mohd Nor	PAS				
P033	Besut	N04	Hulu Besut	23,846	Nawi Mohamad	**BN** (**UMNO**)	Nawi Mohamad	UMNO	Mohd Husaimi Hussin	BERSATU			Che Harun Kamariah	**IND**
P034	Setiu	N05	Jabi	25,192	Azman Ibrahim	**PN** (**PAS**)	Rosdi Zakaria	UMNO	Azman Ibrahim	PAS				
P034	Setiu	N06	Permaisuri	30,739	Abd Halim Jusoh	**BN** (**UMNO**)	Hamdan Hamzah	UMNO	Mohd Yusop Majid	BERSATU				
P034	Setiu	N07	Langkap	22,439	Sabri Mohd Noor	**BN** (**UMNO**)	Sabri Mohd Noor	UMNO	Azmi Maarof	PAS				
P034	Setiu	N08	Batu Rakit	29,919	Bazlan Abd Rahman	**BN** (**UMNO**)	Bazlan Abd Rahman	UMNO	Mohd Shafizi Ismail	PAS				
P035	Kuala Nerus	N09	Tepuh	30,448	Hishamuddin Abdul Karim	**PN** (**PAS**)	Muhammad Hanafi Hasan	UMNO	Hishamuddin Abdul Karim	PAS				
P035	Kuala Nerus	N10	Buluh Gading	27,845	Ridzuan Hashim	**PN** (**PAS**)	Omar Adam	UMNO	Ridzuan Hashim	PAS				
P035	Kuala Nerus	N11	Seberang Takir	27,733	Ahmad Razif Abdul Rahman	**BN** (**UMNO**)	Ahmad Razif Abdul Rahman	UMNO	Khazan Che Mat	BERSATU				
P035	Kuala Nerus	N12	Bukit Tunggal	21,055	Alias Razak	**PN** (**PAS**)	Wan Noorislan Wan Hashim	UMNO	Zaharudin Zahid	PAS				
P036	Kuala Terengganu	N13	Wakaf Mempelam	34,509	Wan Sukairi Wan Abdullah	**PN** (**PAS**)	Wan Mohd Haikal Wan Ghazali	PKR	Wan Sukairi Wan Abdullah	PAS				
P036	Kuala Terengganu	N14	Bandar	22,057	Ahmad Shah Muhamed	**PN** (**PAS**)	Armi Irzan Mohd	UMNO	Ahmad Shah Muhamed	PAS	Luqman Long	**MUDA**		
P036	Kuala Terengganu	N15	Ladang	26,250	Tengku Hassan Tengku Omar	**PN** (**PAS**)	Mohd Sabri Azmi	UMNO	Zuraida Md Noor	PAS				
P036	Kuala Terengganu	N16	Batu Buruk	40,759	Muhammad Khalil Abdul Hadi	**PN** (**PAS**)	Mohamad Zamir Ghazali	AMANAH	Muhammad Khalil Abdul Hadi	PAS				
P037	Marang	N17	Alur Limbat	36,087	Ariffin Deraman	**PN** (**PAS**)	Yuseri Isa	UMNO	Ariffin Deraman	PAS				
P037	Marang	N18	Bukit Payung	28,823	Mohd Nor Hamzah	**PN** (**PAS**)	Mohd Khim @ Mohd Khan Abdul Rahman	UMNO	Mohd Nor Hamzah	PAS				
P037	Marang	N19	Ru Rendang	32,867	Ahmad Samsuri Mokhtar	**PN** (**PAS**)	Suhaimi Sulaiman	AMANAH	Ahmad Samsuri Mokhtar	PAS				
P037	Marang	N20	Pengkalan Berangan	35,248	Sulaiman Sulong	**PN** (**PAS**)	Nik Dir Nik Wan Ku	UMNO	Sulaiman Sulong	PAS				
P038	Hulu Terengganu	N21	Telemung	21,495	Rozi Mamat	**BN** (**UMNO**)	Rozi Mamat	UMNO	Mohd Zawawi Ismail	BERSATU				
P038	Hulu Terengganu	N22	Manir	20,639	Hilmi Harun	**PN** (**PAS**)	Eka Lisut	PKR	Hilmi Harun	PAS				
P038	Hulu Terengganu	N23	Kuala Berang	21,428	Mamad Puteh	**PN** (**PAS**)	Jalaludin Ismail	UMNO	Mamad Puteh	PAS				
P038	Hulu Terengganu	N24	Ajil	24,922	Maliaman Kassim	**PN** (**PAS**)	Jailani Johari	UMNO	Maliaman Kassim	PAS				
P039	Dungun	N25	Bukit Besi	18,195	Roslee Daud	**BN** (**UMNO**)	Din Adam	UMNO	Ghazali Sulaiman	PAS				
P039	Dungun	N26	Rantau Abang	33,394	Alias Harun	**PN** (**PAS**)	Mohd Asri Mohamad	UMNO	Mohd Fadhli Rahmi Zulkifli	PAS				
P039	Dungun	N27	Sura	30,206	Wan Hapandi Wan Nik	**PN** (**PAS**)	Osman Omar	PKR	Tengku Muhammad Fakhruddin	PAS				
P039	Dungun	N28	Paka	34,839	Satiful Bahri Mamat	**PN** (**PAS**)	Ahmad Abdullah Abd Wahab	UMNO	Satiful Bahri Mamat	PAS				
P040	Kemaman	N29	Kemasik	28,618	Saiful Azmi Suhaili	**PN** (**PAS**)	Mohd Khairi Mohamad Yusof	UMNO	Saiful Azmi Suhaili	PAS				
P040	Kemaman	N30	Kijal	29,491	Ahmad Said	**BN** (**UMNO**)	Ahmad Said	UMNO	Razali Idris	BERSATU				
P040	Kemaman	N31	Cukai	39,153	Hanafiah Mat	**PN** (**PAS**)	Mohamed Rahim Hussin	UMNO	Hanafiah Mat	PAS				
P040	Kemaman	N32	Air Putih	43,826	Ab Razak Ibrahim	**PN** (**PAS**)	Mohd Zaki Salleh	UMNO	Mohd Hafiz Adam	PAS				

== Opinion polls ==
Polling firm	Dates conducted	Sample size	PH+BN	PN	Oth	Lead	Ref
Ilham Centre	29 July – 8 August 2023	2,304	21%	63%	14%	PN +42%	

== Results ==
Party or alliance		Votes	%	Seats	+/–
Perikatan Nasional	Malaysian Islamic Party	414,726	60.04	27	+5
Perikatan Nasional	Malaysian United Indigenous Party	58,301	8.44	5	+5
Perikatan Nasional	Total	473,027	68.48	32	+10
Pakatan Harapan + Barisan Nasional	United Malays National Organisation	197,972	28.66	0	–10
Pakatan Harapan + Barisan Nasional	National Trust Party	9,740	1.41	0	0
Pakatan Harapan + Barisan Nasional	People's Justice Party	9,476	1.37	0	0
Pakatan Harapan + Barisan Nasional	Total	217,188	31.44	0	–10
MUDA + PSM	Malaysian United Democratic Alliance	372	0.05	0	New
Independents		180	0.03	0	0
Total		690,767	100.00	32	–

=== By parliamentary constituency ===
PN won all parliamentary constituency by average percentages.

No.	Constituency	Pakatan Harapan + Barisan Nasional	Perikatan Nasional	Member of Parliament
P033	Besut	39.87%	59.87%	Che Mohd Zulkifly Jusoh
P034	Setiu	36.86%	63.14%	Shaharizukirnain Abdul Kadir
P035	Kuala Nerus	30.03%	69.97%	Alias Razak
P036	Kuala Terengganu	24.35%	75.23%	Ahmad Amzad Hashim
P037	Marang	26.02%	73.98%	Abdul Hadi Awang
P038	Hulu Terengganu	32.35%	67.65%	Rosol Wahid
P039	Dungun	25.04%	74.96%	Wan Hassan Mohd Ramli
P040	Kemaman	36.44%	63.56%	Che Alias Hamid

=== Seats that changed allegiance ===
No.	Seat	Previous Party (2018)	Current Party (2023)
N01	Kuala Besut	Barisan Nasional (UMNO)	Perikatan Nasional (PAS)
N03	Jertih	Barisan Nasional (UMNO)	Perikatan Nasional (PAS)
N04	Hulu Besut	Barisan Nasional (UMNO)	Perikatan Nasional (BERSATU)
N06	Permaisuri	Barisan Nasional (UMNO)	Perikatan Nasional (BERSATU)
N07	Langkap	Barisan Nasional (UMNO)	Perikatan Nasional (PAS)
N08	Batu Rakit	Barisan Nasional (UMNO)	Perikatan Nasional (PAS)
N11	Seberang Takir	Barisan Nasional (UMNO)	Perikatan Nasional (BERSATU)
N21	Telemung	Barisan Nasional (UMNO)	Perikatan Nasional (BERSATU)
N25	Bukit Besi	Barisan Nasional (UMNO)	Perikatan Nasional (PAS)
N30	Kijal	Barisan Nasional (UMNO)	Perikatan Nasional (BERSATU)

== Aftermath ==
Ahmad Samsuri were sworn in as Menteri Besar in front of Sultan of Terengganu for the second term on 15 August 2023, along with 10 EXCO members from PN.
