= Sulaiman Sulong =

Malaysian politician and teacher

Yang Berhormat Tuan Sulaiman Sulong AMT MLA
- سليمان سولوڠ

Deputy Member of the Terengganu State Executive Council
- Incumbent
- Assumed office 15 August 2023 (Tourism, Culture, Environment & Climate Change)
- Monarch: Mizan Zainal Abidin
- Menteri Besar: Ahmad Samsuri Mokhtar
- Member: Razali Idris
- Constituency: Pengkalan Berangan
- In office 16 May 2018 – 14 August 2023 Serving with Ab Razak Ibrahim (Tourism, Culture & Information Technology)
- Monarch: Mizan Zainal Abidin
- Menteri Besar: Ahmad Samsuri Mokhtar
- Member: Ariffin Deraman
- Constituency: Pengkalan Berangan

Member of the Terengganu State Legislative Assembly for Pengkalan Berangan
- Incumbent
- Assumed office 9 May 2018
- Preceded by: A. Latiff Awang (BN–UMNO)
- Majority: 490 (2018); 8,276 (2023)

Personal details
- Born: Sulaiman bin Sulong Terengganu, Malaysia
- Citizenship: Malaysian
- Party: Malaysian Islamic Party (PAS)
- Other political affiliations: Gagasan Sejahtera (GS) (2016–2020); Perikatan Nasional (PN) (since 2020)
- Spouse: Hafizah Abdul Rahman
- Children: 6
- Education: Al-Azhar University
- Occupation: Politician
- Profession: Teacher

Sulaiman bin Sulong is a Malaysian politician and teacher who has served as the Deputy Member of the Terengganu State Executive Council in the Perikatan Nasional (PN) state administration under Menteri Besar Ahmad Samsuri Mokhtar and Member Ariffin Deraman for his first term and member Razali Idris for his second term, as well as Member of the Terengganu State Legislative Assembly (MLA) for Pengkalan Berangan since May 2018. He is a member of the Malaysian Islamic Party (PAS), a component party of the PN and formerly Gagasan Sejahtera (GS) coalitions.

== Political career ==
=== Member of the Terengganu State Legislative Assembly (since 2018) ===
In the 2018 Terengganu state election, Sulaiman made his electoral debut after being nominated by PAS to contest for the Pengkalan Berangan seat. He won the seat and was elected as the Pengkalan Berangan MLA for the first term.

=== Deputy Member of the Terengganu State Executive Council (since 2018) ===
On 16 May 2018 after PAS took over the state administration from BN after PAS defeated BN in the 2018 state election, Sulaiman was appointed as Terengganu Deputy EXCO Member in charge of Tourism, Culture and Information Technology alongside another Deputy EXCO Member Ab Razak Ibrahim by Menteri Besar Ahmad Samsuri to deputise for EXCO Member Ariffin.

== Election results ==
Terengganu State Legislative Assembly
Year	Constituency	Candidate	Votes	Pct	Opponent(s)	Votes	Pct	Ballots cast	Majority	Turnout
2013	N20 Pengkalan Berangan	Sulaiman Sulong (PAS)	9,829	45.70%	A. Latiff Awang (UMNO)	11,677	54.30%	21,776	1,848	90.60%
2018	N20 Pengkalan Berangan	Sulaiman Sulong (PAS)	11,896	48.66%	A. Latiff Awang (UMNO)	11,406	46.66%	24,855	490	88.10%
2018	N20 Pengkalan Berangan	Sulaiman Sulong (PAS)	11,896	48.66%	Aidi Ahmad (BERSATU)	1,145	4.68%	24,855	490	88.10%
2023	N20 Pengkalan Berangan	Sulaiman Sulong (PAS)	17,946	64.98%	Nik Dir Nik Wan Ku (UMNO)	9,670	35.02%	27,616	8,276	78.35%

== Honours ==
- Terengganu
  - Member of the Order of the Crown of Terengganu (AMT) (2023)
