= Hilmi Harun =

Malaysian politician

Yang Berhormat Tuan Hilmi Harun AMT MLA
- حيلمي بن هارون

Deputy Member of the Terengganu State Executive Council (Agriculture, Agro-based Industry and Rural Development : 10 May 2018 – 15 August 2023 & Plantation, Agriculture, Food Security & Commodities : since 16 August 2023)
- Incumbent
- Assumed office 10 May 2018
- Monarch: Mizan Zainal Abidin
- Menteri Besar: Ahmad Samsuri Mokhtar
- Member: Azman Ibrahim
- Preceded by: Position established
- Constituency: Manir

Member of the Terengganu State Legislative Assembly for Manir
- Incumbent
- Assumed office 5 May 2013
- Preceded by: Harun Taib (PR–PAS)
- Majority: 588 (2013); 2,844 (2018); 11,260 (2023)

Personal details
- Born: Hilmi bin Harun; 4 January 1977 (age 49) Terengganu, Malaysia
- Citizenship: Malaysian
- Party: Malaysian Islamic Party (PAS)
- Other political affiliations: Pakatan Rakyat (PR) (2008–2015); Gagasan Sejahtera (GS) (2016–2020); Perikatan Nasional (PN) (since 2020)
- Occupation: Politician

Hilmi bin Harun (born 4 January 1977) is a Malaysian politician who has served as Deputy Member of the Terengganu State Executive Council (EXCO) in the Perikatan Nasional (PN) state administration under Menteri Besar Ahmad Samsuri Mokhtar and Member Azman Ibrahim since May 2018 as well as Member of the Terengganu State Legislative Assembly (MLA) for Manir since May 2013. He is a member of the Malaysian Islamic Party (PAS), a component party of the PN and formerly the Gagasan Sejahtera (GS) as well as the Pakatan Rakyat (PR) coalitions.

== Election results ==
Terengganu State Legislative Assembly
Year	Constituency		Votes	Pct	Opponent(s)	Votes	Pct	Ballots cast	Majority	Turnout
2013	N22 Manir	Hilmi Harun (PAS)	6,873	52.23%	Yusof Awang Hitam (UMNO)	6,285	47.77%	13,317	588	91.20%
2018	N22 Manir	Hilmi Harun (PAS)	8,716	58.07%	Yusof Awang Hitam (UMNO)	5,872	39.12%	15,181	2,844	88.10%
2018	N22 Manir	Hilmi Harun (PAS)	8,716	58.07%	Mohd Hafizuddin Hussain (AMANAH)	422	2.81%	15,181	2,844	88.10%
2023	N22 Manir	Hilmi Harun (PAS)	13,471	85.90%	Eka Lisut (PKR)	2,211	14.10%	15,682	11,260	75.98%

== Honours ==
- Terengganu
  - Member of the Order of the Crown of Terengganu (AMT) (2024)
