= Mohd Hafiz Adam =

Malaysian politician

Yang Berhormat Tuan Mohd Hafiz Adam AMT MLA
- محمد حفيظ آدم
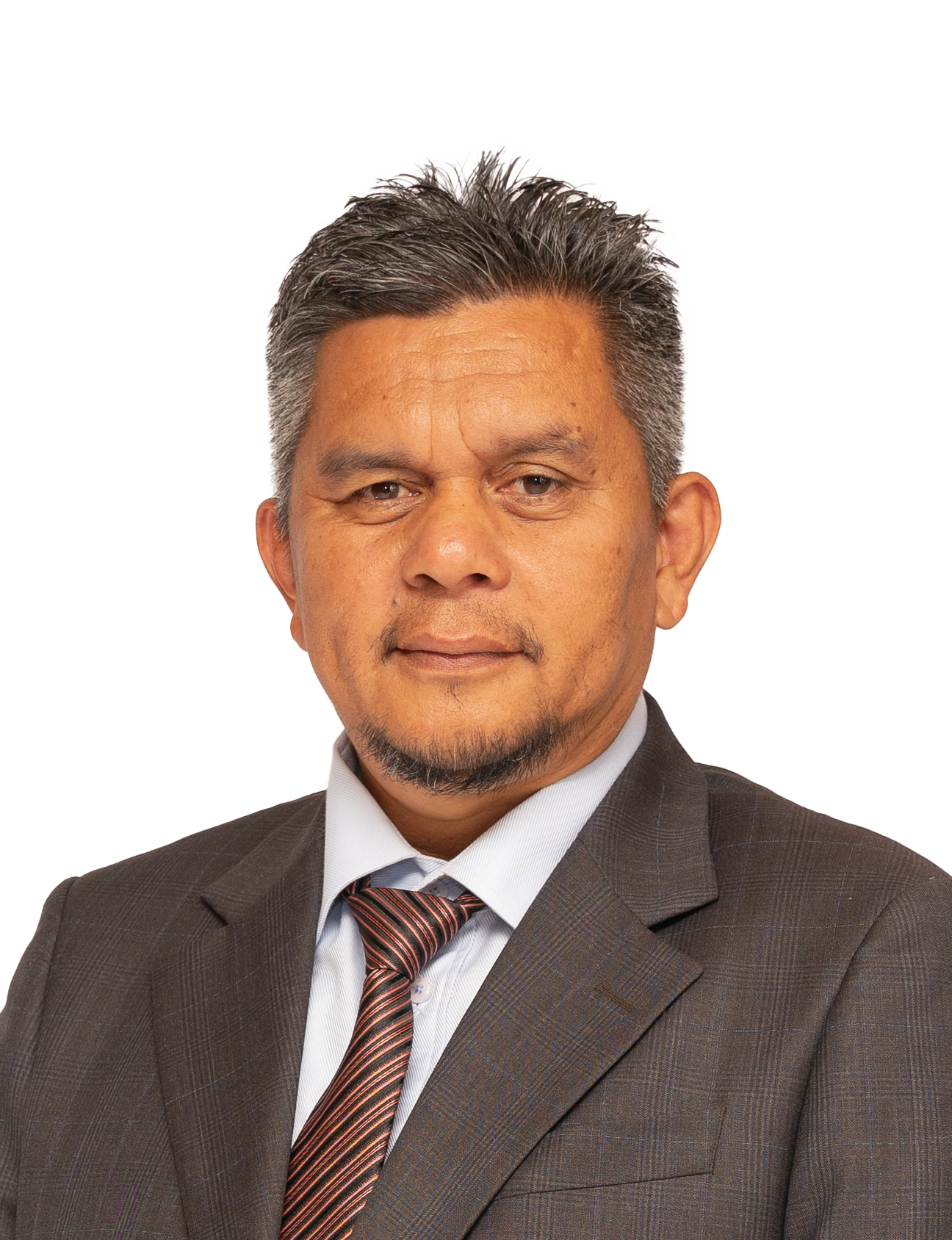
- Mohd Hafiz Adam

Member of the Terengganu State Legislative Assembly for Air Putih
- Incumbent
- Assumed office 12 August 2023
- Preceded by: Ab Razak Ibrahim (PN–PAS)
- Majority: 10,328 (2023)

Personal details
- Party: Malaysian Islamic Party (PAS)
- Occupation: Politician

Mohd Hafiz bin Adam is a Malaysian politician who served as Member of the Terengganu State Legislative Assembly (MLA) for Air Putih since August 2023. He is a member of Malaysian Islamic Party (PAS), a component party of Perikatan Nasional (PN).

== Election results ==
Terengganu State Legislative Assembly
Year	Constituency	Candidate	Votes	Pct	Opponent(s)	Votes	Pct	Ballots cast	Majority	Turnout
2023	N32 Air Putih	Mohd Hafiz Adam (PAS)	21,664	65.65%	Mohd Zaki Salleh (UMNO)	11,336	34.35%	33,176	10,328	75.70%

== Honours ==
- Terengganu
  - Member of the Order of the Crown of Terengganu (AMT) (2025)
