= Zuraida Md Noor =

Malaysian politician

Yang Berhormat Puan Zuraida Md Noor AMZ MLA

Deputy Member of the Terengganu State Executive Council
- Incumbent
- Assumed office 15 August 2023
- Monarch: Mizan Zainal Abidin
- Menteri Besar: Ahmad Samsuri Mokhtar
- Member: Maliaman Kassim
- Portfolio: Welfare, Women and Family Development & National Unity
- Preceded by: Alias Harun (Welfare, Women and Family Development & National Unity)
- Constituency: Ladang

Member of the Terengganu State Legislative Assembly for Ladang
- Incumbent
- Assumed office 12 August 2023
- Preceded by: Tengku Hassan Tengku Omar (PN–PAS)
- Majority: 4,373 (2023)

Member of the Terengganu State Legislative Assembly for Nominated (Women)
- In office 2018–2023

Director-General of the Ameerah Malaysia
- In office 2019–2021
- Preceded by: Husna Hashim
- Succeeded by: Siti Mastura Muhammad

Personal details
- Born: Zuraida binti Md Noor; 1 August 1980 (age 45) Kuala Terengganu, Terengganu
- Party: Malaysian Islamic Party (PAS)
- Other political affiliations: Perikatan Nasional (PN)
- Occupation: Politician

Zuraida binti Md Noor is a Malaysian politician who has served as Deputy Member of the Terengganu State Executive Council (EXCO) in the Perikatan Nasional (PN) administration under Menteri Besar Ahmad Samsuri Mokhtar and Member Maliaman Kassim as well as Member of the Terengganu State Legislative Assembly (MLA) for Ladang since August 2023. She is a member of the Malaysian Islamic Party (PAS), a component party of the PN coalition and formerly Gagasan Sejahtera (GS) coalitions.

== Election results ==
Terengganu State Legislative Assembly
| Year | Constituency | Candidate | Votes | Pct | Opponent(s) | Votes | Pct | Ballots cast | Majority | Turnout |
|---|---|---|---|---|---|---|---|---|---|---|
| 2023 | N15 Ladang | Zuraida Md Noor (PAS) | 11,663 | 61.54% | Mohd Sabri Azmi (UMNO) | 7,290 | 38.46% | 19,136 | 4,373 | 72.90% |

== Honours ==
- Terengganu
  - Member of the Order of Sultan Mizan Zainal Abidin of Terengganu (AMZ) (2025)
