= Ridzuan Hashim =

Malaysian politician

Yang Berhormat Tuan Ridzuan Hashim MLA
- رضوان بن هاشم

Deputy Member of the Terengganu State Executive Council (Human Development, Da'wah and Information)
- Incumbent
- Assumed office 10 May 2018
- Monarch: Mizan Zainal Abidin
- Menteri Besar: Ahmad Samsuri Mokhtar
- Member: Mohd Nor Hamzah
- Preceded by: Position established
- Constituency: Buluh Gading

Member of the Terengganu State Legislative Assembly for Buluh Gading
- Incumbent
- Assumed office 9 May 2018
- Preceded by: Position established
- Majority: 4,567 (2018); 10,366 (2023)

Member of the Terengganu State Legislative Assembly for Teluk Pasu
- In office 5 May 2013 – 9 May 2018
- Preceded by: Abdul Rahin Mohd Said (BN–UMNO)
- Succeeded by: Position abolished
- Majority: 109 (2013)

Faction represented in Terengganu State Legislative Assembly
- 2013–2020: Malaysian Islamic Party
- 2020–: Perikatan Nasional

Personal details
- Born: Ridzuan bin Hashim; 7 January 1972 (age 54) Terengganu, Malaysia
- Citizenship: Malaysian
- Party: Malaysian Islamic Party (PAS)
- Other political affiliations: Perikatan Nasional (PN); Gagasan Sejahtera (GS); Pakatan Rakyat (PR)
- Occupation: Politician

Ridzuan bin Hashim is a Malaysian politician (born 7 January 1972) who has served as Deputy Member of the Terengganu State Executive Council (EXCO) in the Perikatan Nasional (PN) under Menteri Besar Ahmad Samsuri Mokhtar and Member Mohd Nor Hamzah since May 2018 as well as Member of the Terengganu State Legislative Assembly (MLA) for Buluh Gading since May 2018. He served as the MLA for Teluk Pasu from May 2013 to May 2018. He is a member of the Malaysian Islamic Party (PAS), a component party of the PN and formerly Pakatan Rakyat (PR) coalitions.

== Election results ==
Terengganu State Legislative Assembly
Year	Constituency		Votes	Pct	Opponent(s)	Votes	Pct	Ballots cast	Majority	Turnout
2008	N10 Teluk Pasu	Ridzuan Hashim (PAS)	6,817	48.36%	Abdul Rahin Mohd Said (UMNO)	7,279	51.64%	14,250	462	88.37%
2013	N10 Teluk Pasu	Ridzuan Hashim (PAS)	9,098	50.30%	Abdul Rahin Mohd Said (UMNO)	8,989	49.70%	18,283	109	91.10%
2018	N10 Buluh Gading	Ridzuan Hashim (PAS)	11,580	59.42%	Che Mansor Che Salleh (UMNO)	7,013	35.99%	19,847	4,567	88.10%
2018	N10 Buluh Gading	Ridzuan Hashim (PAS)	11,580	59.42%	Azik Chik (AMANAH)	894	4.59%	19,847	4,567	88.10%
2023	N10 Buluh Gading	Ridzuan Hashim (PAS)	16,213	73.50%	Omar Adam (UMNO)	5,847	26.50%	22,060	10,366	79.22%
