= Alias Harun =

Malaysian politician

Alias Harun AMZ
- ألياس بن هارون

Deputy Member of the Terengganu State Executive Council (Welfare, Women and Family Development and National Unity)
- In office 10 May 2018 – 15 August 2023
- Monarch: Mizan Zainal Abidin
- Menteri Besar: Ahmad Samsuri Mokhtar
- Member: Hanafiah Mat
- Preceded by: Position established
- Succeeded by: Zuraida Md Noor
- Constituency: Rantau Abang

Member of the Terengganu State Legislative Assembly for Rantau Abang
- In office 5 May 2013 – 12 August 2023
- Preceded by: Za'abar Mohd Adib (BN–UMNO)
- Succeeded by: Mohd Fadhli Rahmi Zulkifli (PN–PAS)
- Majority: 141 (2013); 4,452 (2018)

Personal details
- Born: Alias bin Harun; 26 February 1951 (age 75) Terengganu, Federation of Malaya (now Malaysia)
- Citizenship: Malaysian
- Party: Malaysian Islamic Party (PAS)
- Other political affiliations: Pakatan Rakyat (PR) (2008–2015); Gagasan Sejahtera (GS) (2016–2020); Perikatan Nasional (PN) (since 2020)
- Occupation: Politician

Alias bin Harun (born 26 February 1951) is a Malaysian politician who served as Deputy Member of the Terengganu State Executive Council (EXCO) in the Perikatan Nasional (PN) state administration under Menteri Besar Ahmad Samsuri Mokhtar and Member Hanafiah Mat from May 2018 to August 2023 and Member of the Terengganu State Legislative Assembly (MLA) for Rantau Abang from May 2013 to August 2023. He is a member of the Malaysian Islamic Party (PAS), a component party of the PN and formerly Gagasan Sejahtera (GS) as well as Pakatan Rakyat (PR) coalitions.

== Election results ==
Terengganu State Legislative Assembly
Year	Constituency	Candidate	Votes	Pct	Opponent(s)	Votes	Pct	Ballots cast	Majority	Turnout
2013	N26 Rantau Abang	Alias Harun (PAS)	8,964	50.15%	Za'abar Mohd Adib (UMNO)	8,823	49.35%	18,125	141	88.10%
2013	N26 Rantau Abang	Alias Harun (PAS)	8,964	50.15%	Mazlan Harun (IND)	90	0.50%	18,125	141	88.10%
2018	N26 Rantau Abang	Alias Harun (PAS)	12,287	58.34%	Wan Zulkifli Wan Gati (UMNO)	7,835	37.20%	21,411	4,452	86.30%
2018	N26 Rantau Abang	Alias Harun (PAS)	12,287	58.34%	Mohammad Padeli Jusoh (PKR)	939	4.46%	21,411	4,452	86.30%

== Honours ==
- Terengganu
  - Member of the Order of Sultan Mizan Zainal Abidin of Terengganu (AMZ) (2023)
