= Pengkalan Berangan =

Political subdivision in Malaysia

Pengkalan Berangan (N20)
Terengganu constituency

State constituency
- Legislature: Terengganu State Legislative Assembly
MLA
Sulaiman Sulong
PN
- Constituency created: 1994
- First contested: 1995
- Last contested: 2023

Demographics
- Electors (2023): 35,248

N20 Pengkalan Berangan within Terengganu, as used for the 2023 state election

Pengkalan Berangan is a state constituency in Terengganu, Malaysia, that has been represented in the Terengganu State Legislative Assembly.

The state constituency was first contested in 1995 and is mandated to return a single Assemblyman to the Terengganu State Legislative Assembly under the first-past-the-post voting system.

== Demographics ==
Ethnic breakdown of Pengkalan Berangan's electorate as of 2018
1. Malay (95.8%)
2. Chinese (3.88%)
3. Other ethnicities (0.30%)
4. Indian (0.07%)

== History ==
=== Polling districts ===
According to the Gazette issued on 30 March 2018, the Pengakalan Berangan constituency has a total of 15 polling districts.

| State Constituency | Polling Districts | Code | Location |
|---|---|---|---|
| Pengkalan Berangan (N20) | Sungai Serai | 037/20/01 | SK Gondang |
| Pengkalan Berangan (N20) | Binjai Rendah | 037/20/02 | SMK Bukit Sawa |
| Pengkalan Berangan (N20) | Cerang China | 037/20/03 | SMK Wakaf Tapai |
| Pengkalan Berangan (N20) | Wakaf Tapai | 037/20/04 | SK Wakaf Tapai |
| Pengkalan Berangan (N20) | Jerung Surau | 037/20/05 | SK Jerong |
| Pengkalan Berangan (N20) | Bukit Parit | 037/20/06 | Institut Latihan Perindustrian Marang |
| Pengkalan Berangan (N20) | Pengkalan Berangan | 037/20/07 | SK Pengkalan Berangan |
| Pengkalan Berangan (N20) | Kubu | 037/20/08 | SK Kubu |
| Pengkalan Berangan (N20) | Mercang | 037/20/09 | SK Merchang |
| Pengkalan Berangan (N20) | Pasir Putih | 037/20/10 | SK Pasir Puteh |
| Pengkalan Berangan (N20) | Jambu Bongkok | 037/20/11 | SMK Datuk Awang Jabar |
| Pengkalan Berangan (N20) | Gong Balai | 037/20/12 | SK Gong Balai |
| Pengkalan Berangan (N20) | Padang Mengkuang | 037/20/13 | SK Padang Mengkuang |
| Pengkalan Berangan (N20) | Durian Guling | 037/20/14 | SMA Durian Guling |
| Pengkalan Berangan (N20) | Bukit Jejulung | 037/20/15 | SK Bukit Jejulong |

=== Representation history ===
Members of the Legislative Assembly for Pengkalan Berangan
| Assembly | No | Years | Members | Party |
Constituency created from Binjai and Mercang
| 9th | N20 | 1995–1999 | Muda Mamat | BN (UMNO) |
| 10th | N20 | 1999–2004 | Mustafa Ali | PAS |
| 11th | N20 | 2004–2008 | Yahya Khatib Mohamad | BN (UMNO) |
| 12th | N20 | 2008–2013 | Yahya Khatib Mohamad | BN (UMNO) |
| 13th | N20 | 2013–2018 | A. Latiff Awang | BN (UMNO) |
| 14th | N20 | 2018–2020 | Sulaiman Sulong | PAS |
| 14th | N20 | 2020–2023 | Sulaiman Sulong | PN (PAS) |
| 15th | N20 | 2023–present | Sulaiman Sulong | PN (PAS) |

== Election results ==
Terengganu state election, 2023: Pengkalan Berangan
| Party | Candidate | Votes | % | ∆% |
|---|---|---|---|---|
| PAS | Sulaiman Sulong | 17,946 | 64.98 | ▲16.32 |
| BN | Nik Dir Nik Wan Ku | 9,670 | 35.02 | ▼11.64 |
| Total valid votes | | 27,616 | 100.00 | |
| Total rejected ballots | | 167 | | |
| Unreturned ballots | | 31 | | |
| Turnout | | 27,814 | 78.91 | ▼9.23 |
| Registered electors | | 35,248 | | |
| Majority | | 8,276 | 29.97 | ▲27.96 |
| PAS hold | | Swing | | |

Terengganu state election, 2018: Pengkalan Berangan
| Party | Candidate | Votes | % | ∆% |
|---|---|---|---|---|
| PAS | Sulaiman Sulong | 11,896 | 48.66 | ▲2.96 |
| BN | Abdul Latiff Awang | 11,406 | 46.66 | ▼7.64 |
| PKR | Aidi Ahmad | 1,145 | 4.68 | ▲4.68 |
| Total valid votes | | 24,447 | 100.00 | |
| Total rejected ballots | | 326 | | |
| Unreturned ballots | | 82 | | |
| Turnout | | 24,855 | 88.14 | ▼2.35 |
| Registered electors | | 28,200 | | |
| Majority | | 490 | 2.00 | ▼6.59 |
| PAS gain from BN | | Swing | | - |

Terengganu state election, 2013: Pengkalan Berangan
| Party | Candidate | Votes | % | ∆% |
|---|---|---|---|---|
| BN | Abdul Latiff Awang | 11,677 | 54.30 | ▲1.54 |
| PAS | Sulaiman Sulong | 9,829 | 45.70 | ▼1.54 |
| Total valid votes | | 21,506 | 100.00 | |
| Total rejected ballots | | 270 | | |
| Unreturned ballots | | 20 | | |
| Turnout | | 21,796 | 90.49 | ▲2.85 |
| Registered electors | | 24,087 | | |
| Majority | | 1,848 | 8.59 | ▲3.08 |
| BN hold | | Swing | | |

Terengganu state election, 2008: Pengkalan Berangan
| Party | Candidate | Votes | % | ∆% |
|---|---|---|---|---|
| BN | Yahya Khatib Mohamad | 8,900 | 52.76 | ▼1.86 |
| PAS | Mohd Draman | 7,970 | 47.24 | ▲1.86 |
| Total valid votes | | 16,870 | 100.00 | |
| Total rejected ballots | | 295 | | |
| Unreturned ballots | | 2 | | |
| Turnout | | 17,167 | 87.64 | ▼1.27 |
| Registered electors | | 19,588 | | |
| Majority | | 930 | 5.51 | ▼3.73 |
| BN hold | | Swing | | |

Terengganu state election, 2004: Pengkalan Berangan
| Party | Candidate | Votes | % | ∆% |
|---|---|---|---|---|
| BN | Yahya Khatib Mohamad | 8,103 | 54.62 | ▲10.98 |
| PAS | Mustafa Ali | 6,732 | 45.38 | ▼10.98 |
| Total valid votes | | 14,835 | 100.00 | |
| Total rejected ballots | | 191 | | |
| Unreturned ballots | | 14 | | |
| Turnout | | 15,040 | 88.91 | ▲5.74 |
| Registered electors | | 16,916 | | |
| Majority | | 1,371 | 9.24 | ▼3.47 |
| BN gain from PAS | | Swing | | - |

Terengganu state election, 1999: Pengkalan Berangan
| Party | Candidate | Votes | % | ∆% |
|---|---|---|---|---|
| PAS | Mustafa Ali | 7,131 | 56.36 | ▲11.64 |
| BN | Latef Mohd Noor | 5,522 | 43.64 | ▼11.64 |
| Total valid votes | | 12,653 | 100.00 | |
| Total rejected ballots | | 361 | | |
| Unreturned ballots | | 12 | | |
| Turnout | | 13,026 | 83.17 | ▲0.44 |
| Registered electors | | 15,662 | | |
| Majority | | 1,609 | 12.72 | ▲2.15 |
| PAS gain from BN | | Swing | | - |

Terengganu state election, 1995: Pengkalan Berangan
| Party | Candidate | Votes | % |
|---|---|---|---|
| BN | Muda Mamat | 6,444 | 55.28 |
| PAS | Muhammad Abdullah | 5,212 | 44.72 |
| Total valid votes | | 11,656 | 100.00 |
| Total rejected ballots | | 258 | |
| Unreturned ballots | | 13 | |
| Turnout | | 11,927 | 82.73 |
| Registered electors | | 14,417 | |
| Majority | | 1,232 | 10.57 |
This was a new constituency created.
