= Ariffin Deraman =

Malaysian politician

Yang Berhormat Dato' Ariffin Deraman DPMT SMZ MLA
- عارفين بن درحمن

Member of the Terengganu State Executive Council (Tourism, Culture & Information Technology : 16 May 2018 – 15 August 2023 Entrepreneurship, Human Resources, Cooperatives & Consumer Affairs : since 16 August 2023) (Note: Assumed portfolios on 16 August 2023.)
- Incumbent
- Assumed office 15 August 2023
- Monarch: Mizan Zainal Abidin
- Menteri Besar: Ahmad Samsuri Mokhtar
- Deputy: Mohd Yusop Majid
- Constituency: Alur Limbat
- In office 16 May 2018 – 15 August 2023
- Monarch: Mizan Zainal Abidin
- Menteri Besar: Ahmad Samsuri Mokhtar
- Deputy: Sulaiman Sulong; Abdul Razak Ibrahim
- Succeeded by: Razali Idris
- Constituency: Alur Limbat

Member of the Terengganu State Legislative Assembly for Alur Limbat
- Incumbent
- Assumed office 5 May 2013
- Preceded by: Alias Abdullah (BN–UMNO)
- Majority: 645 (2013); 4,194 (2018); 12,656 (2023)

Faction represented in Terengganu State Legislative Assembly
- 2013–2020: Malaysian Islamic Party
- 2020–: Perikatan Nasional

Personal details
- Born: Ariffin bin Deraman; 10 June 1968 (age 57) Terengganu, Malaysia
- Citizenship: Malaysian
- Party: Malaysian Islamic Party (PAS)
- Other political affiliations: Pakatan Rakyat (PR) (2008–2015); Gagasan Sejahtera (GS) (2016–2020); Perikatan Nasional (PN) (since 2020)
- Occupation: Politician

Ariffin bin Deraman is a Malaysian politician who has served as Member of the Terengganu State Executive Council (EXCO) in the Perikatan Nasional (PN) state administration under Menteri Besar Ahmad Samsuri Mokhtar since May 2018 as well as Member of the Terengganu State Legislative Assembly (MLA) for Alur Limbat since May 2013. He is a member of the Malaysian Islamic Party (PAS), a component party of the PN coalition. During his tenure as the Terengganu EXCO Member in charge of Tourism, he oversaw the recognition of Kenyir Lake as the national geopark of Malaysia.

== Political career ==
=== Member of the Terengganu State Legislative Assembly (since 2013) ===
In the 2013 Terengganu state election, Ariffin made his electoral debut after being nominated to contest for the Alur Limbat seat. He won the seat and was elected to the Terengganu State Legislative Assembly as the Alur Limbat MLA for the first term after defeating defending MLA Alias Abdullah of Barisan Nasional (BN) and independent candidate Ja'afar Jambol by a majority of 645 votes.

In the 2018 Terengganu state election, Ariffin was renominated by PAS to defend the Alur Limbat seat. He defended the seat and was reelected as the Alur Limbat MLA for the second term after defeating Saiful Bahri Baharuddin of BN and Ahmad Sabri Ali @ Mamat of Pakatan Harapan (PH) by a majority of 4,194 votes.

In the 2023 Terengganu state election, Ariffin was renominated by PN to defend the Alur Limbat seat. He defended the seat was reelected as the Alur Limbat MLA for the third term after defeating Mohd Yuseri Isa of BN by a significantly increased majority of 12,656 votes.

=== Member of the Terengganu State Executive Council (since 2018) ===
On 16 May 2018 after PAS took over the state administration from BN after PAS defeated BN in the 2018 state election, Ariffin was appointed as Terengganu EXCO Member in charge of Tourism, Culture and Information Technology by Menteri Besar Ahmad Samsuri. On 15 August 2023, PN was reelected to power in the 2023 state election, Ariffin was reappointed to the position but was given different portfolios of Entrepreneurship, Human Resources, Cooperatives and Consumer Affairs the following day.

==== Recognition of Kenyir Lake as the national geopark ====
As the Terengganu EXCO Member in charge of Tourism, Ariffin declared the Kenyir Lake as the national geopark and renamed it to the Kenyir Geopark. He added that this recognition was given by the National Geopark Committee. Ariffin described it as one of the best achievements of the state administration which has been working hard to establish the lake as a geopark since 2015 as one of the initiatives of the "2030 Terengganu Sejahtera Master Plan" (PITAS 2030). He also fixed 2027 to hold a reassessment of its geopark status. He stressed that the recognition would open up a new dimension for the tourism sector, create various job and economic opportunities and develop the socioeconomics.

== Election results ==
Terengganu State Legislative Assembly
Year	Constituency	Candidate	Votes	Pct	Opponent(s)	Votes	Pct	Ballots cast	Majority	Turnout
2013	N17 Alur Limbat	Ariffin Deraman (PAS)	10,844	51.35%	Alias Abdullah (UMNO)	10,199	48.30%	21,361	645	89.20%
2013	N17 Alur Limbat	Ariffin Deraman (PAS)	10,844	51.35%	Ja'afar Jambol (IND)	74	0.35%	21,361	645	89.20%
2018	N17 Alur Limbat	Ariffin Deraman (PAS)	13,330	55.64%	Saiful Bahri Baharuddin (UMNO)	9,136	38.13%	24,320	4,194	86.70%
2018	N17 Alur Limbat	Ariffin Deraman (PAS)	13,330	55.64%	Ahmad Sabri Ali @ Mamat (PKR)	1,492	6.23%	24,320	4,194	86.70%
2023	N17 Alur Limbat	Ariffin Deraman (PAS)	20,133	72.92%	Yuseri Isa (UMNO)	7,477	27.08%	27,822	12,656	77.10%

== Honours ==
- Terengganu
  - Knight Commander of the Order of the Crown of Terengganu (DPMT) – Dato' (2025)
  - Companion of the Order of Sultan Mizan Zainal Abidin of Terengganu (SMZ) (2022)
