= Air Putih (Terengganu state constituency) =

Political subdivision in Malaysia

Air Putih (N32)
Terengganu constituency

State constituency
- Legislature: Terengganu State Legislative Assembly
MLA
Mohd Hafiz Adam
PN
- Constituency created: 1994
- First contested: 1995
- Last contested: 2023

Demographics
- Electors (2023): 43,826

N32 Air Putih within Terengganu, as used for the 2023 state election

Air Putih is a state constituency in Terengganu, Malaysia, that has been represented in the Terengganu State Legislative Assembly.

The state constituency was first contested in 1995 and is mandated to return a single Assemblyman to the Terengganu State Legislative Assembly under the first-past-the-post voting system

== Demographics ==
Ethnic breakdown of Air Putih's electorate as of 2018
1. Malay (95.8%)
2. Chinese (2.51%)
3. Other ethnicities (0.93%)
4. Indian (0.78%)

== History ==
=== Polling districts ===
According to the gazette issued on 30 March 2018, the Air Putih constituency has a total of 14 polling districts.

State Constituency	Polling Districts	Code	Location
Air Putih (N32)	Mak Chili	040/32/01	SK Pusat
Air Putih (N32)	Bukit Mentok	040/32/02	SK Bukit Mentok
Air Putih (N32)	Pasir Minal	040/32/03	SK Seri Jaya
Air Putih (N32)	Binjai	040/32/04	SK Binjai; Kolej Vokesional Kemaman
Air Putih (N32)	Pasir Gajah	040/32/05	SK Pasir Gajah
Air Putih (N32)	Seberang Tayur	040/32/06	SK RKT Seberang Tayor
Air Putih (N32)	Dadung	040/32/07	SMK Ayer Puteh
Air Putih (N32)	Air Putih	040/32/08	SK Ayer Puteh
Air Putih (N32)	Bandar Cerul	040/32/09	SK (FELDA) Cherul
Air Putih (N32)	Bandar Baru Cenih	040/32/10	SMK Cheneh Baru
Air Putih (N32)	Sungai Peragam	040/32/11	SK Sungai Pergam
Air Putih (N32)	FELDA Neram 1	040/32/12	SK FELDA Neram Satu; SK Kampong Baharu FELDA Neram I
Air Putih (N32)	Hulu Jabur	040/32/13	SK Lembah Jabor
Air Putih (N32)	FELDA Neram 2	040/32/14	SK Cheneh Baru

=== Representation history ===
Members of the Legislative Assembly for Air Putih
Assembly	No	Years	Member	Party
Constituency created from Bukit Bandi
9th	N32	1995–1999	Harun Hasan	BN (UMNO)
10th	N32	1999–2004	Ismail Harun	PAS
11th	N32	2004–2008	Wan Ahmad Nizam Wan Abdul Hamid	BN (UMNO)
12th	N32	2008–2013	Wan Ahmad Nizam Wan Abdul Hamid	BN (UMNO)
13th	N32	2013–2018	Wan Abdul Hakim Wan Mokhtar	BN (UMNO)
14th	N32	2018–2020	Ab Razak Ibrahim	PAS
14th	N32	2020–2023	Ab Razak Ibrahim	PN (PAS)
15th	N32	2023–present	Mohd Hafiz Adam	PN (PAS)

== Election results ==
Terengganu state election, 2023
Party	Candidate	Votes	%	∆%
PAS	Mohd Hafiz Adam	21,664	65.65	▲18.29
BN	Mohd Zaki Salleh	11,336	34.35	▼10.29
Total valid votes		33,000	100.00	
Total rejected ballots		159		
Unreturned ballots		17		
Turnout		33,176	75.70	▼10.36
Registered electors		43,826		
Majority		10,328	31.30	▲28.58
PAS hold		Swing		
Source(s) "Keputusan rasmi PRN 2023 - Terengganu" (in Malay). Berita Harian.

Terengganu state election, 2018
Party	Candidate	Votes	%	∆%
PAS	Ab Razak Ibrahim	12,985	47.36	▲5.12
BN	Wan Hakim Wan Mokhtar	12,239	44.64	▼13.12
PKR	Mohd Zukri Aksah	2,195	8.01	▲8.01
Total valid votes		27,419	100.00	
Total rejected ballots		407		
Unreturned ballots		148		
Turnout		27,974	86.06	▼1.74
Registered electors		32,507		
Majority		746	2.72	▼12.80
PAS gain		Swing		{{{3}}}
Source(s) "14th General Election Malaysia (GE14 / PRU14) - Terengganu". The Star.

Terengganu state election, 2013
Party	Candidate	Votes	%	∆%
BN	Wan Abdul Hakim Wan Mokhtar	13,523	57.76	▼3.02
PAS	Ab Razak Ibrahim	9,890	42.24	▲3.02
Total valid votes		23,413	100.00	
Total rejected ballots		317		
Unreturned ballots		72		
Turnout		23,802	87.79	▲2.52
Registered electors		27,111		
Majority		3,633	15.52	▼6.04
BN hold		Swing		

Terengganu state election, 2008
Party	Candidate	Votes	%	∆%
BN	Wan Abdul Hakim Wan Mokhtar	10,771	60.78	▼2.73
PAS	IsmailB Harun	6,950	39.22	▲2.73
Total valid votes		17,721	100.00	
Total rejected ballots		248		
Unreturned ballots		16		
Turnout		17,985	85.27	▼3.72
Registered electors		21,091		
Majority		3,821	21.56	▼5.45
BN hold		Swing		

Terengganu state election, 2004
Party	Candidate	Votes	%	∆%
BN	Wan Ahmad Nizam Wan Abdul Hamid	10,048	63.51	▲15.76
PAS	Ismail Harun	5,774	36.49	▼15.76
Total valid votes		15,822	100.00	
Total rejected ballots		218		
Unreturned ballots		12		
Turnout		16,052	88.99	▲7.55
Registered electors		18,038		
Majority		4,274	27.01	▲22.51
BN gain from PAS		Swing		-

Terengganu state election, 1999
Party	Candidate	Votes	%	∆%
PAS	Ismail Harun	5,561	52.25	▲16.21
BN	Ramli Taib	5,082	47.75	▼16.21
Total valid votes		10,643	100.00	
Total rejected ballots		288		
Unreturned ballots		8		
Turnout		10,939	81.44	▲1.44
Registered electors		13,432		
Majority		479	4.50	▼23.42
PAS gain from BN		Swing		-

Terengganu state election, 1995
Party	Candidate	Votes	%
BN	Harun Hasan	6,069	63.96
PAS	Ismail Harun	3,420	36.04
Total valid votes		9,489	100.00
Total rejected ballots		314	
Unreturned ballots		14	
Turnout		9,817	80.00
Registered electors		12,271	
Majority		2,649	27.92
This was a new constituency created.
