= Perikatan Nasional =

Political coalition in Malaysia

Perikatan Nasional National Alliance
- Abbreviation: PN
- Chairman: Ahmad Samsuri Mokhtar
- Secretary-General: Takiyuddin Hassan
- Spokesperson: Annuar Musa
- Deputy Chairman: Dominic Lau Hoe Chai; Punithan Paramsiven; Tuan Ibrahim Tuan Man; Mukhriz Mahathir; Hamzah Zainudin
- Treasurer-General: Subramaniam Surunaryan
- Women Chief: Vacant
- Youth Chief: Afnan Hamimi Taib Azamudden
- Elections Director: Muhammad Sanusi Md Nor
- Founder: Muhyiddin Yassin
- Founded: 29 February 2020
- Registered: 7 August 2020
- Split from: Pakatan Harapan (PH) (BERSATU); Gagasan Sejahtera (GS) (PAS); Barisan Nasional (BN) (GERAKAN)
- Headquarters: Level SA-2, Menara RKT, No 36 Jalan Raja Abdullah Off Jalan Sultan Ismail 50300 Kuala Lumpur
- Newspaper: Harakah
- Ideology: Islamism; Islamic fundamentalism; Religious conservatism; Ketuanan Melayu; Religious nationalism; Right-wing populism; Until 2022: Sabah regionalism; 20-point agreement
- Political position: Right-wing to far-right
- National affiliation: Barisan Nasional (2020–2022) (Note: From March 2020 to July 2021 as the senior partner in a coalition government, junior partner from August 2021 to October 2022. The party was aligned with Gabungan Parti Sarawak and Gabungan Rakyat Sabah (2020–2022))
- Member parties: PAS; WAWASAN; GERAKAN; MIPP; PEJUANG; BERSATU (disputed)
- Colours: Dark blue and white
- Slogan: Mengeratkan perpaduan ('Strengthen unity') Satukan rakyat bersama Perikatan Nasional ('Unite the people with the National Alliance!') Bersih dan Stabil ('Clean and Stable')
- Anthem: Kami Perikatan Nasional
- Dewan Negara: 8 / 70
- Dewan Rakyat: 49 / 222
- State Legislative Assemblies: 156 / 612
- Chief minister of states: 4 / 13

Election symbol
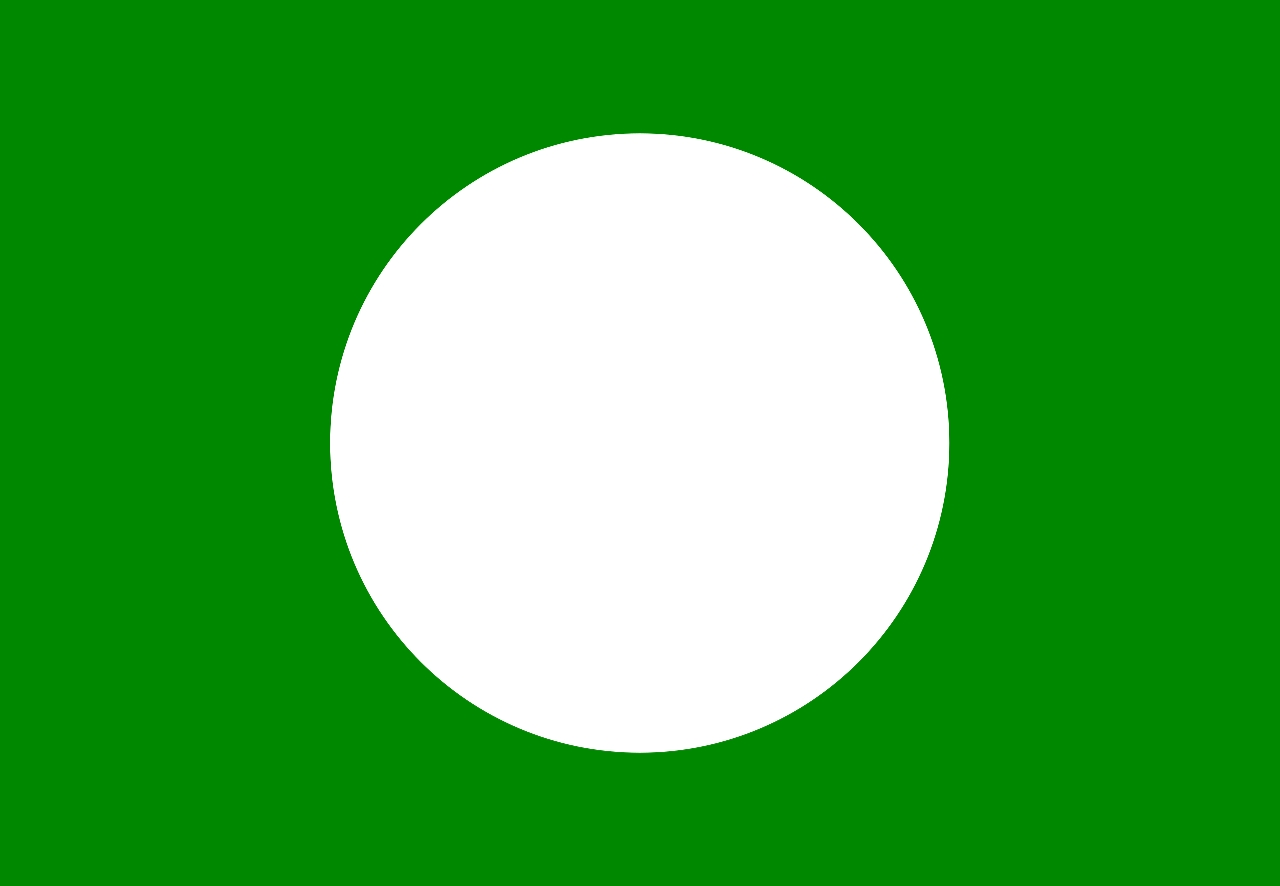
- (apart from the states of Kelantan and Terengganu) (Only in Kelantan and Terengganu)

Party flag

Website
- Official party website Campaign website

Perikatan Nasional (PN; English: National Alliance) is a Malaysian political coalition. It is the second largest political coalition in Dewan Rakyat with 49 seats after Pakatan Harapan (PH) with 76 seats. The coalition consists of the Malaysian Islamic Party (PAS), National Vision Party (WAWASAN), Malaysian People's Movement Party (GERAKAN), Malaysian Indian People's Party (MIPP), and Homeland Fighter's Party (PEJUANG).

Perikatan Nasional was formed early in the 2020–2022 Malaysian political crisis with the intention of replacing the Pakatan Harapan (PH) government. Muhyiddin Yassin, then the de facto leader of PN, was appointed the 8th Prime Minister of Malaysia, bringing the informal political coalition into government. It formed a coalition government with Barisan Nasional (BN), Gabungan Parti Sarawak (GPS), Gabungan Rakyat Sabah (GRS) and other political parties which ruled from 2020 to 2022. Following Muhyiddin's resignation as prime minister in 2021, the coalition continued to participate in government under prime minister Ismail Sabri Yaakob.

Following the 2022 election, coalition deputy chairman Hamzah Zainudin became Leader of the Opposition. He was briefly replaced by chairman Ahmad Samsuri Mokhtar following his sacking from BERSATU but was reinstated in June 2026.

== History ==
=== Formation ===
As an informal coalition, Perikatan Nasional was formed by the Malaysian United Indigenous Party (BERSATU), Malaysian Islamic Party (PAS), Barisan Nasional (BN), Gabungan Parti Sarawak (GPS), and Homeland Solidarity Party (STAR) at the beginning of the 2020–2022 Malaysian political crisis in a bid to replace the then ruling Pakatan Harapan (PH) government.

Having proven to the Yang di-Pertuan Agong that the coalition held a majority of seats in the Dewan Rakyat and supported his candidacy, the coalition's de facto leader Muhyiddin Yassin was sworn in as the 8th Prime Minister of Malaysia on 1 March 2020.

As a formal coalition, it consisted of BERSATU, PAS, and STAR at the time of its registration in August 2020. It was expanded to include the Sabah Progressive Party (SAPP) that month, followed by Parti Gerakan Rakyat Malaysia (GERAKAN) in February 2021, and later the Malaysian Indian People's Party (MIPP) in April 2024.

=== Since 2020 ===
The coalition's first election was the 2020 Sabah state election, where it won 17 state assembly seats as part of the Gabungan Rakyat Sabah coalition. It also participated in the 2021 Malacca state election and the 2022 Johor state election.

In 2021, Muhyiddin resigned as prime minister after losing his majority in parliament, after the United Malays National Organisation (UMNO), a major component of BN, pulled its support.

In 2024, the Perikatan Nasional state governments of Perlis, Kedah, Kelantan and Terengganu formed a joint company known as "SG4 Group Sdn. Bhd" (State Government 4) for economic collaboration and equal revenue sharing between the 4 states. In 2026, Mahathir Mohamad, the advisor of SG4, described the economic potential of these four states as "sleeping giant".

Following the coalition's decision to contest in the 2025 Sabah state election, the SAPP exited the coalition.

Due to strained party-to-party relations, PAS decided to break political cooperation with BERSATU on 8 June 2026. Both parties however confirmed separately they would remain members of the coalition. Following the split, a faction from BERSATU led by Hamzah Zainudin formed a new party, Parti Wawasan Negara (WAWASAN) on 13 June 2026. Coalition chairman Ahmad Samsuri Mokhtar, taking over the post earlier in February 2026, authorised the new party to compete under Perikatan Nasional in the Johor and Negeri Sembilan state elections later that year. In July 2026, Muhyiddin announced BERSATU's intention to form a new coalition once the Negeri Sembilan state election had concluded, involving parties in Ikatan Prihatin Rakyat (IPR), including Parti Bumiputera Perkasa Malaysia (PUTRA) and the United for the Rights of Malaysians Party (URIMAI).

In August 2026, PAS president Abdul Hadi Awang subsequently asserted that BERSATU's membership had automatically lapsed as a result of Muhyiddin's declaration. In response, BERSATU lodged a complaint with the Registrar of Societies, the regulatory body for organisations such as political parties, alleging that PAS was infringing on the rights of component parties through unilateral acts that went against the coalition's constitution. Ahmad Shamsuri subsequently issued a rebuttal of Abdul Hadi's comment. The Registrar issued the coalition a show-cause letter on 22 September and suspended its activities from 23 September onwards. In response, the coalition imposed a temporary gag order restricting public statements on behalf of the coalition to its secretary-general and chairman.

On 20 October, the coalition's explanation in its response to the show-cause letter was deemed insufficient to maintain its registration, resulting in its cancellation ahead of the 2026 Malacca state election by the Registrar. However, the deregistration and earlier suspension were stayed by court order on 22 October, allowing it to participate in the state election.

== Member parties ==
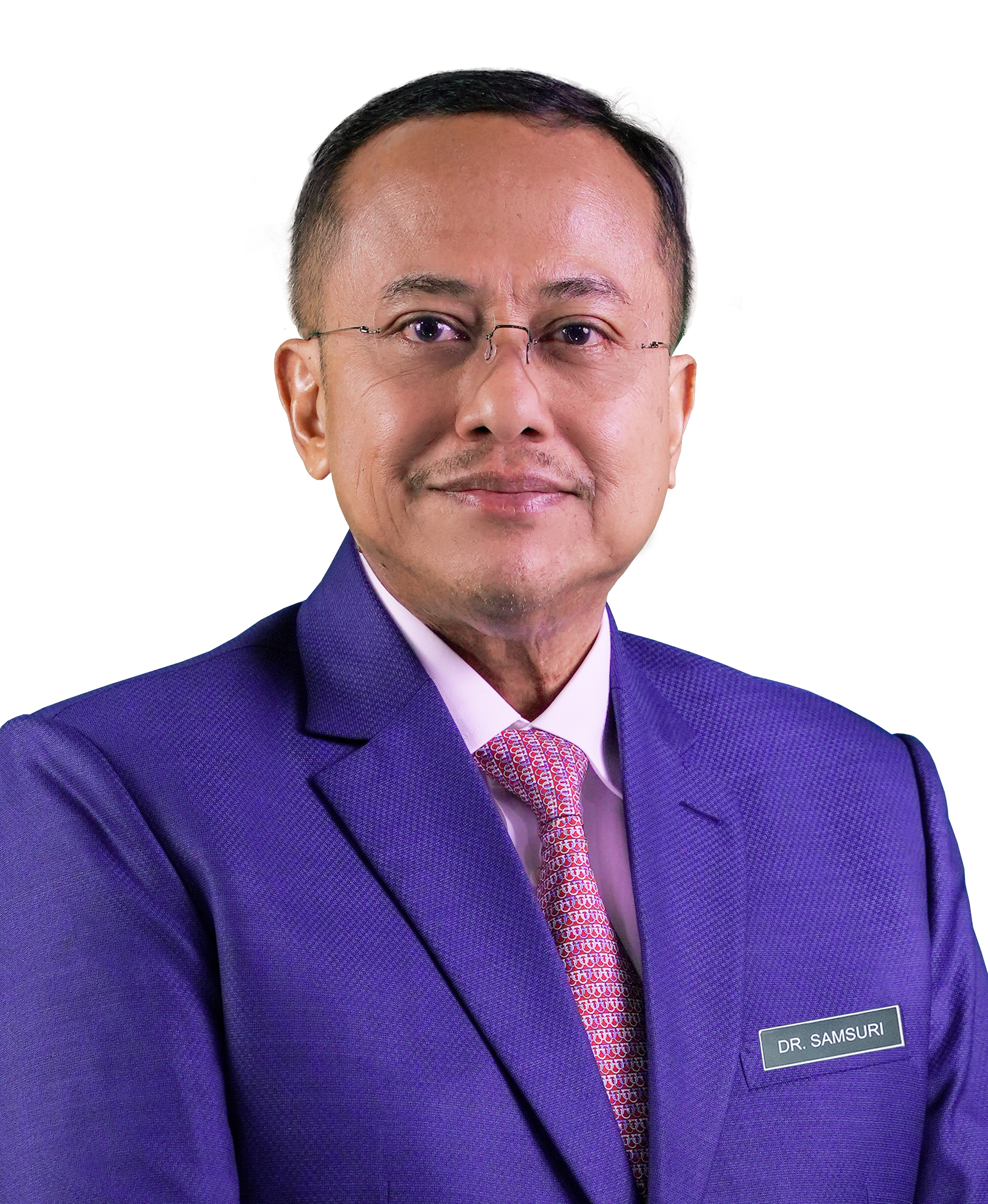
Ahmad Samsuri Mokhtar, the incumbent Chairman of Perikatan Nasional (PN) and Vice President of the Malaysian Islamic Party (PAS).

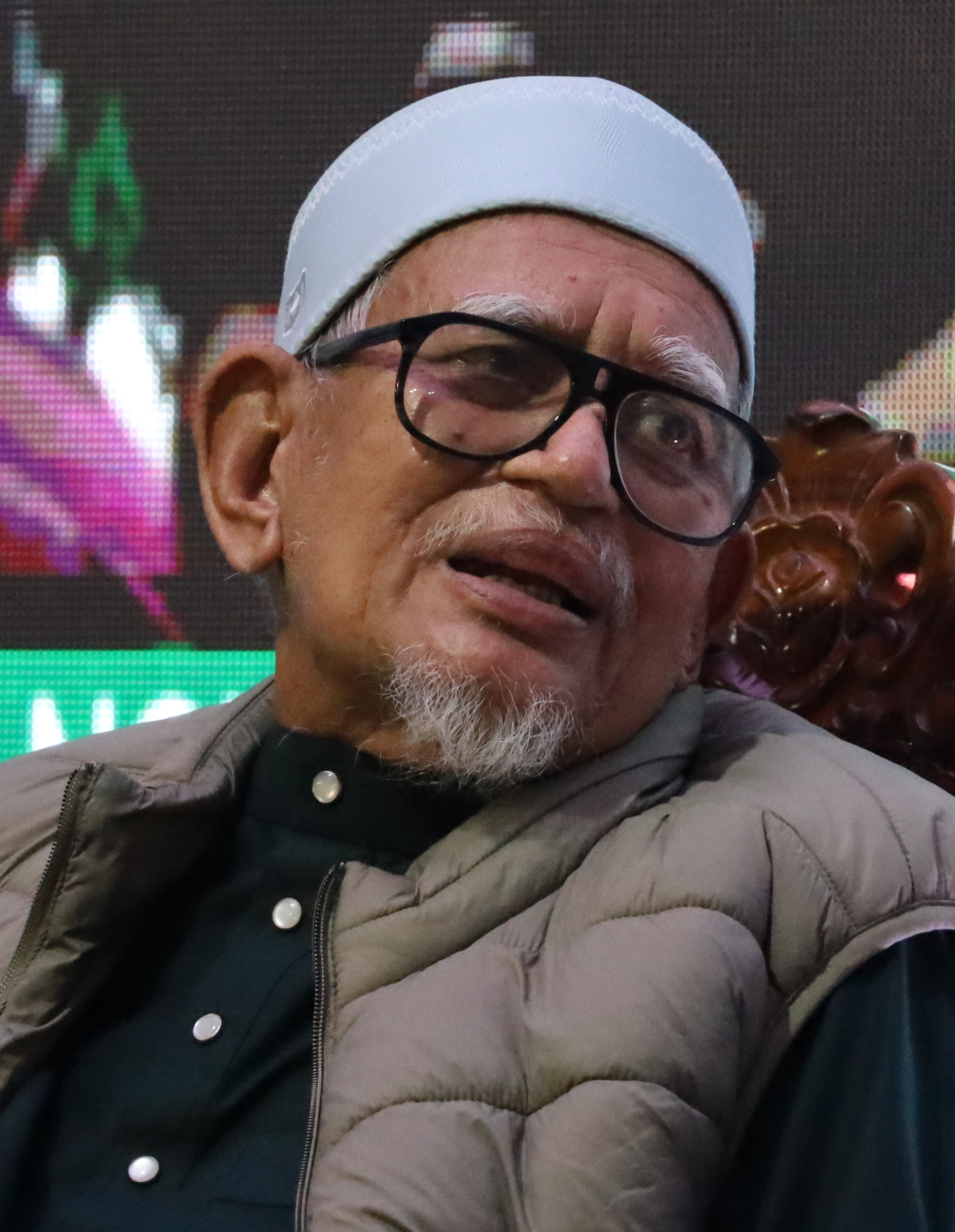
Abdul Hadi Awang, President of the Malaysian Islamic Party (PAS).

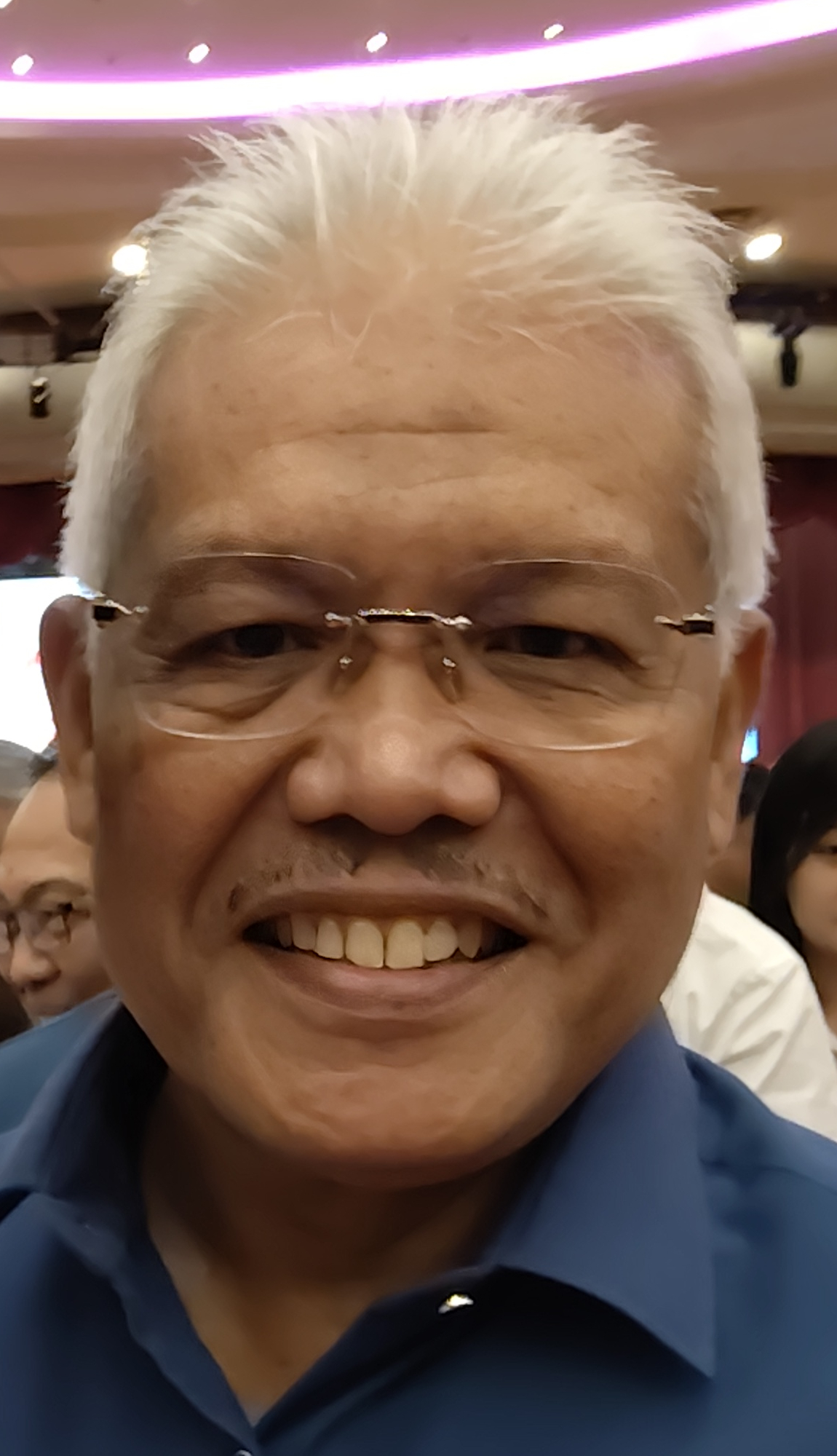
Hamzah Zainudin, President of the National Vision Party (WAWASAN).

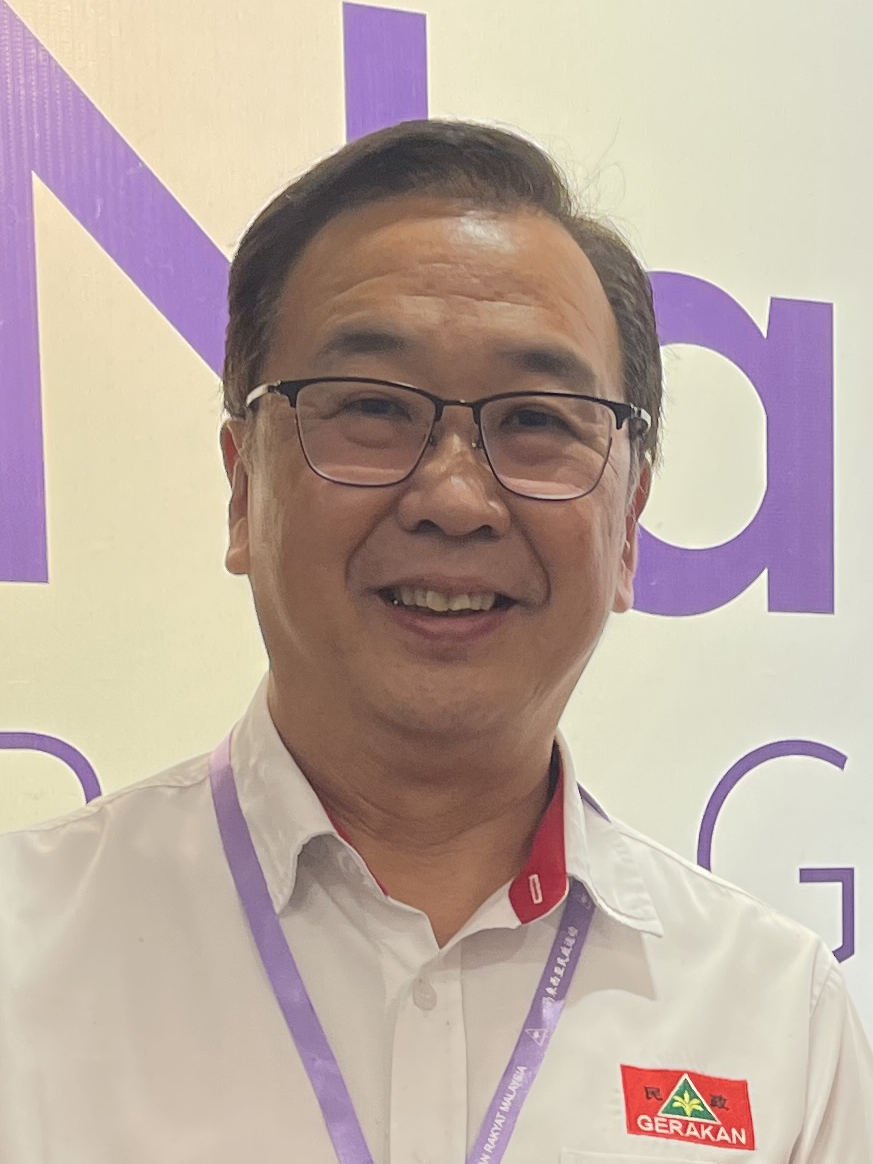
Dominic Lau Hoe Chai, President of the Parti Gerakan Rakyat Malaysia (GERAKAN).

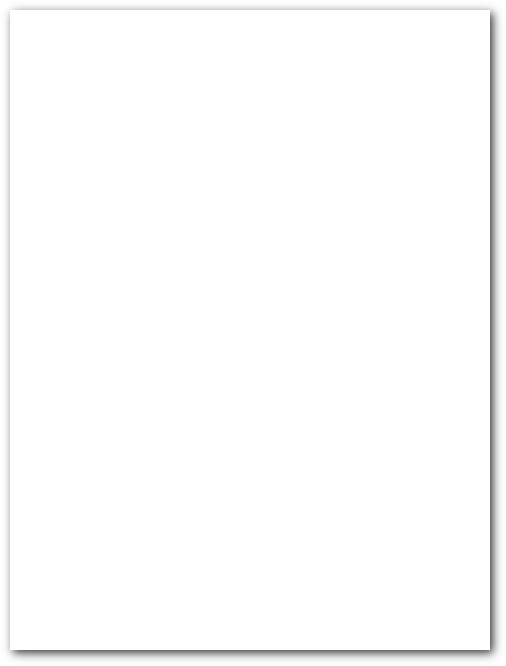
Punithan Paramsiven, President of the Malaysian Indian People's Party (MIPP).

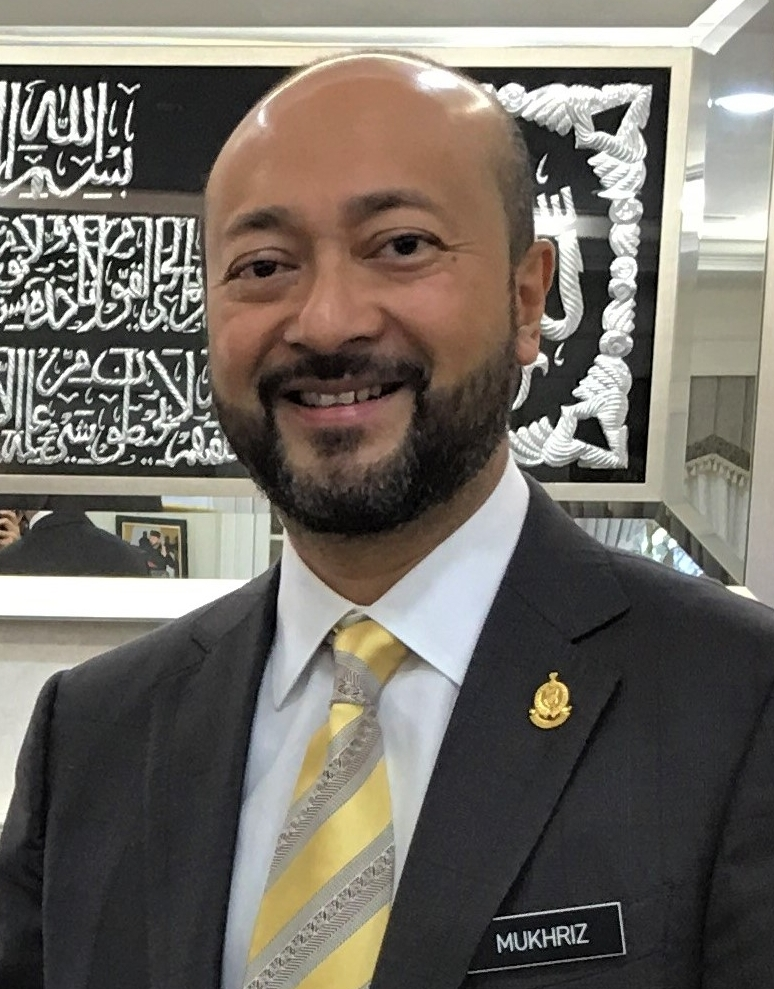
Mukhriz Mahathir, President of the Homeland Fighter's Party (PEJUANG).

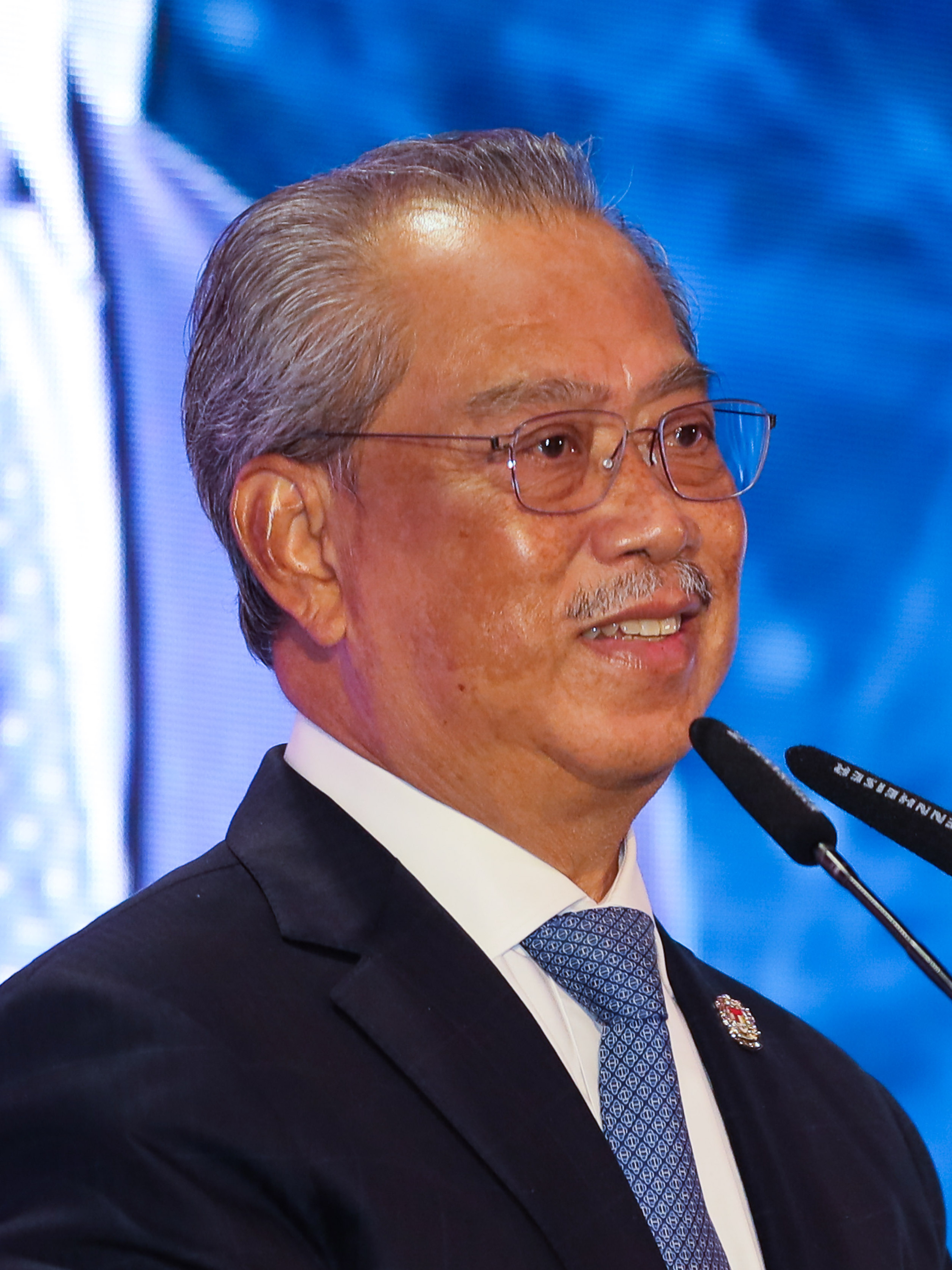
Muhyiddin Yassin, President of the Malaysian United Indigenous Party (BERSATU) (membership disputed).

| Logo | Name | | Ideology | Position | Leader(s) | Seats contested | 2022 result | | Current seats | State Legislature seats |
| Logo | Name | | Ideology | Position | Leader(s) | Seats contested | Votes (%) | Seats | Composition | State Legislature seats |
|---|---|---|---|---|---|---|---|---|---|---|
Member parties
| | PAS | Malaysian Islamic Party; Parti Islam Se-Malaysia | Islamism | Far-right | Abdul Hadi Awang | 61 | 14.56% | 43 / 222 | 43 / 49 | 146 / 612 |
| | WAWASAN | National Vision Party; Parti Wawasan Negara | Social conservatism | Right-wing | Hamzah Zainudin | New entry | New entry | 0 / 222 | 6 / 49 | 8 / 612 |
| | GERAKAN | Malaysian People's Movement Party; Parti Gerakan Rakyat Malaysia | Liberalism | Centre | Dominic Lau Hoe Chai | 23 | 1.97% | 0 / 222 | 0 / 49 | 2 / 612 |
| | MIPP | Malaysian Indian People's Party; Parti Rakyat India Malaysia | Malaysian Indians' interests | Centre-right to right-wing | Punithan Paramsiven | New entry | New entry | 0 / 222 | 0 / 49 | 0 / 612 |
| | PEJUANG | Homeland Fighter's Party; Parti Pejuang Tanah Air | Ketuanan Melayu | Right-wing | Mukhriz Mahathir | 68 | 0.57% | 0 / 222 | 0 / 49 | 0 / 612 |
Membership disputed
| | BERSATU (membership disputed) | Malaysian United Indigenous Party; Parti Pribumi Bersatu Malaysia | Ketuanan Melayu | Right-wing | Muhyiddin Yassin | 87 | 13.22% | 31 / 222 | 19 / 222 | 49 / 612 |

=== Friends of PN ===
- Minority Rights Action Party (MIRA) (since 2023)
- National Indian Muslim Alliance Party (IMAN) (since 2023)
- Pan-Malaysian Islamic Front (BERJASA) (2020–2022, since 2026)

=== Former member parties ===
- Homeland Solidarity Party (STAR), (2020–2022)
- Malaysian United Indigenous Party of Sabah (Sabah BERSATU), (2020–2022) (resigned under Hajiji Noor) (rejoined PN under Ronald Kiandee on December 11, 2022). (Note: A large part of Sabah BERSATU leadership under Hajiji Noor resigned on 10 December 2022. New leadership under Ronald Kiandee confirmed allegiance with PN on 11 December 2022.)
- Sabah Progressive Party (SAPP), (2020–2024)
- ~~Malaysian United Indigenous Party (BERSATU), (2020–2026)~~ (membership disputed)

=== Former allied parties ===
This list excludes parties allied to Perikatan Nasional solely by virtue of coalition of coalitions entered by Perikatan Nasional

- United Sabah Party (PBS) (2020–2022)
- Malaysia National Alliance Party (IKATAN) (2020–2022)
- Liberal Democratic Party (LDP) (2021–2022)
- Parti Bangsa Malaysia (PBM) (2021–2022)

== Organisational structure ==
=== Presidential Council ===
- Presidential Council:
  - Abdul Hadi Awang (PAS)
  - Hamzah Zainudin (WAWASAN)
  - Dominic Lau Hoe Chai (GERAKAN)
  - Punithan Paramsiven (MIPP)
  - Mukhriz Mahathir (PEJUANG)

=== Supreme Council / Executive Council ===
- Chairman:
  - Ahmad Samsuri Mokhtar (PAS)
- Deputy Chairman:
  - Hamzah Zainudin (WAWASAN)
  - Dominic Lau Hoe Chai (GERAKAN)
  - Punithan Paramsiven (MIPP)
  - Tuan Ibrahim Tuan Man (PAS)
  - Mukhriz Mahathir (PEJUANG)
- Secretary-General:
  - Takiyuddin Hassan (PAS)
- Deputy Secretary-General:
  - Wong Chia Zhen (GERAKAN)
- Treasurer-General:
  - Subramaniam Surunaryan (MIPP)
- Information Chief:
  - Annuar Musa (PAS)
- Women Chief:
  - Vacant
- Youth Chief:
  - Afnan Hamimi Taib Azamudden (PAS)
- Elections Director:
  - Muhammad Sanusi Md Nor (PAS)
- Executive Secretary:
  - Mohd Zaidy Abdul Talib (PAS)
- Supreme Council Members:
  - Idris Ahmad (PAS)
  - Rosni Adam (PAS)
  - Oh Tong Keong (GERAKAN)
  - Baljit Singh Jigiri Singh (GERAKAN)
  - Sivakumar Krishnan (MIPP)
  - Sathes Kumar Nilamaham (MIPP)
  - To be determined (PEJUANG)
  - To be determined (PEJUANG)
  - To be determined (WAWASAN)
  - To be determined (WAWASAN)
- State Chairman:
  - Johor: Sahruddin Jamal (BERSATU)
  - Kedah: Muhammad Sanusi Md Nor (PAS)
  - Kelantan: Ahmad Yakob (PAS)
  - Malacca: Vacant
  - Negeri Sembilan: Mohd Fairuz Mohd Isa (PAS)
  - Pahang: Tuan Ibrahim Tuan Man (PAS)
  - Penang: Dominic Lau Hoe Chai (GERAKAN)
  - Perak: Vacant
  - Perlis: Shahidan Kassim (PAS)
  - Federal Territories: Vacant
  - Sabah: Aliakbar Gulasan (PAS)
  - Sarawak: Vacant
  - Selangor: Vacant
  - Terengganu: Alias Razak (PAS)

== Leadership ==
=== Chairman ===
| Chairman of Perikatan Nasional | Took office | Left office |
|---|---|---|
| Muhyiddin Yassin | 23 February 2020 | 31 December 2025 |
| Ahmad Samsuri Mokhtar | 22 February 2026 | Incumbent |

=== Secretary-General ===
| Secretary-General of Perikatan Nasional | Took office | Left office |
|---|---|---|
| Hamzah Zainudin | 18 March 2020 | 9 December 2024 |
| Mohamed Azmin Ali | 9 December 2024 | 31 December 2025 |
| Takiyuddin Hassan | 14 February 2026 | Incumbent |

== Elected representatives ==
=== Dewan Negara (Senate) ===
==== Senators ====
- Kelantan State Legislative Assembly:
  - Wan Martina Wan Yusoff (PAS)
  - Nik Mohamad Abduh Nik Abdul Aziz (PAS)
- Perlis State Legislative Assembly:
  - Azahar Hassan (WAWASAN)
  - Baharuddin Ahmad (PAS)
- Terengganu State Legislative Assembly:
  - Che Alias Hamid (PAS)
  - Hussin Ismail (PAS)
- Kedah State Legislative Assembly:
  - Abd Nasir Idris (PAS)
  - Musoddak Ahmad (PAS)

=== Members of Parliament of the 15th Malaysian Parliament ===
Perikatan Nasional has 49 MPs in the Dewan Rakyat as shown below.

| State | No. | Constituency | Member | Party |
|---|---|---|---|---|
| Perlis | P001 | Padang Besar | Rushdan Rusmi | PAS |
| Perlis | P003 | Arau | Shahidan Kassim | PAS |
| Kedah | P005 | Jerlun | Abdul Ghani Ahmad | PAS |
| Kedah | P007 | Padang Terap | Nurul Amin Hamid | PAS |
| Kedah | P008 | Pokok Sena | Ahmad Saad Yahaya | PAS |
| Kedah | P009 | Alor Setar | Afnan Hamimi Taib Azamudden | PAS |
| Kedah | P010 | Kuala Kedah | Ahmad Fakhruddin Fakhrurazi | PAS |
| Kedah | P011 | Pendang | Awang Hashim | PAS |
| Kedah | P012 | Jerai | Sabri Azit | PAS |
| Kedah | P013 | Sik | Ahmad Tarmizi Sulaiman | PAS |
| Kedah | P016 | Baling | Hassan Saad | PAS |
| Kelantan | P019 | Tumpat | Mumtaz Md. Nawi | PAS |
| Kelantan | P020 | Pengkalan Chepa | Ahmad Marzuk Shaary | PAS |
| Kelantan | P021 | Kota Bharu | Takiyuddin Hassan | PAS |
| Kelantan | P022 | Pasir Mas | Ahmad Fadhli Shaari | PAS |
| Kelantan | P023 | Rantau Panjang | Siti Zailah Mohd Yusoff | PAS |
| Kelantan | P024 | Kubang Kerian | Tuan Ibrahim Tuan Man | PAS |
| Kelantan | P025 | Bachok | Mohd Syahir Che Sulaiman | PAS |
| Kelantan | P028 | Pasir Puteh | Nik Muhammad Zawawi Salleh | PAS |
| Kelantan | P029 | Machang | Wan Ahmad Fayhsal | WAWASAN |
| Kelantan | P031 | Kuala Krai | Abdul Latiff Abdul Rahman | PAS |
| Terengganu | P033 | Besut | Che Mohamad Zulkifly Jusoh | PAS |
| Terengganu | P034 | Setiu | Shaharizukirnain Abdul Kadir | PAS |
| Terengganu | P035 | Kuala Nerus | Alias Razak | PAS |
| Terengganu | P036 | Kuala Terengganu | Ahmad Amzad Hashim | PAS |
| Terengganu | P037 | Marang | Abdul Hadi Awang | PAS |
| Terengganu | P039 | Dungun | Wan Hassan Mohd Ramli | PAS |
| Terengganu | P040 | Kemaman | Ahmad Samsuri Mokhtar | PAS |
| Penang | P041 | Kepala Batas | Siti Mastura Mohamad | PAS |
| Penang | P042 | Tasek Gelugor | Wan Saiful Wan Jan | WAWASAN |
| Penang | P044 | Permatang Pauh | Muhammad Fawwaz Mohamad Jan | PAS |
| Perak | P054 | Gerik | Fathul Huzir Ayob | WAWASAN |
| Perak | P056 | Larut | Hamzah Zainudin | WAWASAN |
| Perak | P057 | Parit Buntar | Mohd Misbahul Munir Masduki | PAS |
| Perak | P058 | Bagan Serai | Idris Ahmad | PAS |
| Perak | P061 | Padang Rengas | Azahari Hasan | WAWASAN |
| Perak | P069 | Parit | Muhammad Ismi Mat Taib | PAS |
| Perak | P073 | Pasir Salak | Jamaludin Yahya | PAS |
| Pahang | P081 | Jerantut | Khairil Nizam Khirudin | PAS |
| Pahang | P082 | Indera Mahkota | Saifuddin Abdullah | WAWASAN |
| Pahang | P083 | Kuantan | Wan Razali Wan Nor | PAS |
| Pahang | P086 | Maran | Ismail Abdul Muttalib | PAS |
| Pahang | P087 | Kuala Krau | Kamal Ashaari | PAS |
| Pahang | P088 | Temerloh | Salamiah Mohd Nor | PAS |
| Selangor | P094 | Hulu Selangor | Mohd Hasnizan Harun | PAS |
| Selangor | P109 | Kapar | Halimah Ali | PAS |
| Selangor | P112 | Kuala Langat | Ahmad Yunus Hairi | PAS |
| Malacca | P136 | Tangga Batu | Bakri Jamaluddin | PAS |
| Malacca | P139 | Jasin | Zulkifli Ismail | PAS |
| Total | Perlis (2), Kedah (9), Kelantan (10), Terengganu (7), Penang (3), Perak (7), Pahang (6), Selangor (3), F.T. Kuala Lumpur (0), F.T. Putrajaya (0), F.T. Labuan (0), Negeri Sembilan (0), Malacca (2), Johor (0), Sabah (0), Sarawak (0) | | | |

=== Dewan Undangan Negeri (State Legislative Assembly) ===
==== Malaysian State Assembly Representatives ====
Terengganu State Legislative Assembly
28 / 33
Kelantan State Legislative Assembly
38 / 45
Kedah State Legislative Assembly
24 / 36
Perlis State Legislative Assembly
5 / 15
Perak State Legislative Assembly
18 / 59
Pahang State Legislative Assembly
15 / 47
Selangor State Legislative Assembly
10 / 56
Penang State Legislative Assembly
7 / 40
Negeri Sembilan State Legislative Assembly
7 / 36
Malacca State Legislative Assembly
3 / 28
Sabah State Legislative Assembly
1 / 79
Johor State Legislative Assembly
0 / 56
Sarawak State Legislative Assembly
0 / 82

| State | No. | Parliamentary Constituency | No. | State Assembly Constituency | Member | Party |
|---|---|---|---|---|---|---|
| Perlis | P001 | Padang Besar | N02 | Beseri | Haziq Asyraf Dun | PAS |
| Perlis | P001 | Padang Besar | N05 | Santan | Mohammad Azmir Azizan | PAS |
| Perlis | P002 | Kangar | N10 | Kayang | Asrul Aimran Abd Jalil | PAS |
| Perlis | P003 | Arau | N14 | Simpang Empat | Razali Saad | PAS |
| Perlis | P003 | Arau | N15 | Sanglang | Mohd Shukri Ramli | PAS |
| Kedah | P005 | Jerlun | N04 | Ayer Hitam | Azhar Ibrahim | PAS |
| Kedah | P006 | Kubang Pasu | N06 | Jitra | Haim Hilman Abdullah | PAS |
| Kedah | P007 | Padang Terap | N07 | Kuala Nerang | Mohamad Yusoff Zakaria | PAS |
| Kedah | P007 | Padang Terap | N08 | Pedu | Mohd Radzi Md Amin | PAS |
| Kedah | P008 | Pokok Sena | N09 | Bukit Lada | Salim Mahmood | PAS |
| Kedah | P008 | Pokok Sena | N10 | Bukit Pinang | Wan Romani Wan Salim | PAS |
| Kedah | P009 | Alor Setar | N12 | Suka Menanti | Dzowahir Ab Ghani | WAWASAN |
| Kedah | P009 | Alor Setar | N14 | Alor Mengkudu | Muhamad Radhi Mat Din | PAS |
| Kedah | P010 | Kuala Kedah | N15 | Anak Bukit | Rashidi Razak | PAS |
| Kedah | P010 | Kuala Kedah | N17 | Pengkalan Kundor | Mardhiyyah Johari | PAS |
| Kedah | P011 | Pendang | N18 | Tokai | Mohd Hayati Othman | PAS |
| Kedah | P011 | Pendang | N19 | Sungai Tiang | Abdul Razak Khamis | WAWASAN |
| Kedah | P012 | Jerai | N20 | Sungai Limau | Mohd Azam Abd Samat | PAS |
| Kedah | P012 | Jerai | N22 | Gurun | Baddrol Bakhtiar | PAS |
| Kedah | P013 | Sik | N23 | Belantek | Ahmad Sulaiman | PAS |
| Kedah | P013 | Sik | N24 | Jeneri | Muhammad Sanusi Md Nor | PAS |
| Kedah | P014 | Merbok | N25 | Bukit Selambau | Azizan Hamzah | PAS |
| Kedah | P014 | Merbok | N26 | Tanjong Dawai | Hanif Ghazali | PAS |
| Kedah | P015 | Sungai Petani | N27 | Pantai Merdeka | Sharir Long | PAS |
| Kedah | P016 | Baling | N31 | Kupang | Najmi Ahmad | PAS |
| Kedah | P016 | Baling | N32 | Kuala Ketil | Mansor Zakaria | PAS |
| Kedah | P017 | Padang Serai | N33 | Merbau Pulas | Siti Ashah Ghazali | PAS |
| Kedah | P018 | Kulim-Bandar Baharu | N35 | Kulim | Wong Chia Zhen | GERAKAN |
| Kedah | P018 | Kulim-Bandar Baharu | N36 | Bandar Baharu | Mohd Suffian Yusoff | PAS |
| Kelantan | P019 | Tumpat | N1 | Pengkalan Kubor | Wan Roslan Wan Hamat | PAS |
| Kelantan | P019 | Tumpat | N2 | Kelaboran | Mohd Adenan Hassan | PAS |
| Kelantan | P019 | Tumpat | N3 | Pasir Pekan | Ahmad Yakob | PAS |
| Kelantan | P019 | Tumpat | N4 | Wakaf Bharu | Mohd Rusli Abdullah | PAS |
| Kelantan | P020 | Pengkalan Chepa | N5 | Kijang | Izani Husin | PAS |
| Kelantan | P020 | Pengkalan Chepa | N6 | Chempaka | Nik Asma' Bahrum Nik Abdullah | PAS |
| Kelantan | P020 | Pengkalan Chepa | N7 | Panchor | Mohd Amar Abdullah | PAS |
| Kelantan | P021 | Kota Bharu | N8 | Tanjong Mas | Rohani Ibrahim | PAS |
| Kelantan | P021 | Kota Bharu | N10 | Bunut Payong | Ramli Mamat | PAS |
| Kelantan | P022 | Pasir Mas | N11 | Tendong | Rozi Muhamad | PAS |
| Kelantan | P022 | Pasir Mas | N12 | Pengkalan Pasir | Mohd Nasriff Daud | PAS |
| Kelantan | P022 | Pasir Mas | N13 | Meranti | Mohd Nassuruddin Daud | PAS |
| Kelantan | P023 | Rantau Panjang | N14 | Chetok | Zuraidin Abdullah | PAS |
| Kelantan | P023 | Rantau Panjang | N15 | Gual Periok | Kamaruzaman Mohamad | PAS |
| Kelantan | P023 | Rantau Panjang | N16 | Apam Putra | Zamakhshari Mohamad | PAS |
| Kelantan | P024 | Kubang Kerian | N17 | Salor | Saizol Ismail | PAS |
| Kelantan | P024 | Kubang Kerian | N18 | Pasir Tumboh | Abd Rahman Yunus | PAS |
| Kelantan | P024 | Kubang Kerian | N19 | Demit | Mohd Asri Mat Daud | PAS |
| Kelantan | P025 | Bachok | N20 | Tawang | Harun Ismail | PAS |
| Kelantan | P025 | Bachok | N21 | Pantai Irama | Mohd Huzaimy Che Husin | PAS |
| Kelantan | P025 | Bachok | N22 | Jelawat | Zameri Mat Nawang | PAS |
| Kelantan | P026 | Ketereh | N23 | Melor | Wan Rohimi Wan Daud | PAS |
| Kelantan | P026 | Ketereh | N24 | Kadok | Azami Mohd Nor | PAS |
| Kelantan | P026 | Ketereh | N25 | Kok Lanas | Mohamed Farid Mohamed Zawawi | WAWASAN |
| Kelantan | P027 | Tanah Merah | N26 | Bukit Panau | Abdul Fattah Mahmood | PAS |
| Kelantan | P027 | Tanah Merah | N28 | Kemahang | Md Anizam Ab Rahman | PAS |
| Kelantan | P028 | Pasir Puteh | N29 | Selising | Tuan Saripuddin Tuan Ismail | PAS |
| Kelantan | P028 | Pasir Puteh | N30 | Limbongan | Nor Asilah Mohamed Zin | PAS |
| Kelantan | P028 | Pasir Puteh | N31 | Semerak | Nor Sham Sulaiman | PAS |
| Kelantan | P028 | Pasir Puteh | N32 | Gaal | Mohd Rodzi Ja’afar | PAS |
| Kelantan | P029 | Machang | N33 | Pulai Chondong | Azhar Salleh | PAS |
| Kelantan | P029 | Machang | N34 | Temangan | Mohamed Fadzli Hassan | PAS |
| Kelantan | P029 | Machang | N35 | Kemuning | Ahmad Zakhran Mat Noor | PAS |
| Kelantan | P030 | Jeli | N38 | Kuala Balah | Abdul Hadi Awang Kechil | PAS |
| Kelantan | P031 | Kuala Krai | N39 | Mengkebang | Zubir Abu Bakar | PAS |
| Kelantan | P031 | Kuala Krai | N40 | Guchil | Hilmi Abdullah | PAS |
| Kelantan | P031 | Kuala Krai | N41 | Manek Urai | Mohd Fauzi Abdullah | PAS |
| Kelantan | P031 | Kuala Krai | N42 | Dabong | Ku Mohd Zaki Ku Hussien | PAS |
| Terengganu | P033 | Besut | N1 | Kuala Besut | Azbi Salleh | PAS |
| Terengganu | P033 | Besut | N2 | Kota Putera | Mohd Nurkhuzaini Ab Rahman | PAS |
| Terengganu | P033 | Besut | N3 | Jertih | Riduan Md Nor | PAS |
| Terengganu | P034 | Setiu | N5 | Jabi | Azman Ibrahim | PAS |
| Terengganu | P034 | Setiu | N7 | Langkap | Azmi Maarof | PAS |
| Terengganu | P034 | Setiu | N8 | Batu Rakit | Mohd Shafizi Ismail | PAS |
| Terengganu | P035 | Kuala Nerus | N9 | Tepuh | Hishamuddin Abdul Karim | PAS |
| Terengganu | P035 | Kuala Nerus | N10 | Buloh Gading | Ridzuan Hashim | PAS |
| Terengganu | P035 | Kuala Nerus | N12 | Bukit Tunggal | Zaharudin Zahid | PAS |
| Terengganu | P036 | Kuala Terengganu | N13 | Wakaf Mempelam | Wan Sukairi Wan Abdullah | PAS |
| Terengganu | P036 | Kuala Terengganu | N14 | Bandar | Ahmad Shah Muhamed | PAS |
| Terengganu | P036 | Kuala Terengganu | N15 | Ladang | Zuraida Md Noor | PAS |
| Terengganu | P036 | Kuala Terengganu | N16 | Batu Buruk | Muhammad Khalil Abdul Hadi | PAS |
| Terengganu | P037 | Marang | N17 | Alur Limbat | Ariffin Deraman | PAS |
| Terengganu | P037 | Marang | N18 | Bukit Payung | Mohd Nor Hamzah | PAS |
| Terengganu | P037 | Marang | N19 | Ru Rendang | Ahmad Samsuri Mokhtar | PAS |
| Terengganu | P037 | Marang | N20 | Pengkalan Berangan | Sulaiman Sulong | PAS |
| Terengganu | P038 | Hulu Terengganu | N22 | Manir | Hilmi Harun | PAS |
| Terengganu | P038 | Hulu Terengganu | N23 | Kuala Berang | Mamad Puteh | PAS |
| Terengganu | P038 | Hulu Terengganu | N24 | Ajil | Maliaman Kassim | PAS |
| Terengganu | P039 | Dungun | N25 | Bukit Besi | Ghazali Sulaiman | PAS |
| Terengganu | P039 | Dungun | N26 | Rantau Abang | Mohd Fadhli Rahmi Zulkifli | PAS |
| Terengganu | P039 | Dungun | N27 | Sura | Tengku Muhammad Fakhruddin | PAS |
| Terengganu | P039 | Dungun | N28 | Paka | Satiful Bahri Mamat | PAS |
| Terengganu | P040 | Kemaman | N29 | Kemasik | Saiful Azmi Suhaili | PAS |
| Terengganu | P040 | Kemaman | N31 | Cukai | Hanafiah Mat | PAS |
| Terengganu | P040 | Kemaman | N32 | Air Putih | Mohd Hafiz Adam | PAS |
| Terengganu | — | | | Nominated Member | Chan Chee How | GERAKAN |
| Penang | P041 | Kepala Batas | N1 | Penaga | Mohd Yusni Mat Piah | PAS |
| Penang | P041 | Kepala Batas | N03 | Pinang Tunggal | Bukhori Ghazali | PAS |
| Penang | P042 | Tasek Gelugor | N04 | Permatang Berangan | Mohd Sobri Saleh | PAS |
| Penang | P042 | Tasek Gelugor | N05 | Sungai Dua | Muhammad Fauzi Yusoff | PAS |
| Penang | P044 | Permatang Pauh | N11 | Permatang Pasir | Amir Hamzah Abdul Hashim | PAS |
| Penang | P047 | Nibong Tebal | N20 | Sungai Bakap | Abidin Ismail | PAS |
| Penang | P053 | Balik Pulau | N39 | Pulau Betong | Mohamad Shukor Zakariah | PAS |
| Perak | P054 | Gerik | N01 | Pengkalan Hulu | Mohamad Amin Roslan | PAS |
| Perak | P055 | Lenggong | N03 | Kenering | Husaini Ariffin | PAS |
| Perak | P056 | Larut | N05 | Selama | Mohd Akmal Kamaruddin | PAS |
| Perak | P056 | Larut | N6 | Kubu Gajah | Khalil Yahaya | PAS |
| Perak | P057 | Parit Buntar | N8 | Titi Serong | Muhammad Hakimi Hamzi Mohd Hayat | PAS |
| Perak | P058 | Bagan Serai | N11 | Gunong Semaggol | Razman Zakaria | PAS |
| Perak | P058 | Bagan Serai | N12 | Selinsing | Sallehuddin Abdullah | PAS |
| Perak | P059 | Bukit Gantang | N14 | Changkat Jering | Rahim Ismail | PAS |
| Perak | P059 | Bukit Gantang | N15 | Trong | Faisal Abdul Rahman | PAS |
| Perak | P060 | Taiping | N16 | Kamunting | Mohd Fakhrudin Abdul Aziz | PAS |
| Perak | P061 | Padang Rengas | N20 | Lubok Merbau | Azizi Mohamed Ridzuan | PAS |
| Perak | P063 | Tambun | N23 | Manjoi | Mohd Hafez Sabri | PAS |
| Perak | P067 | Kuala Kangsar | N35 | Manong | Burhanuddin Ahmad | PAS |
| Perak | P069 | Parit | N40 | Bota | Najihatussalehah Ahmad | PAS |
| Perak | P073 | Pasir Salak | N49 | Sungai Manik | Zainol Fadzi Paharudin | WAWASAN |
| Perak | P073 | Pasir Salak | N50 | Kampong Gajah | Zafarulazaln Zan | PAS |
| Perak | P074 | Lumut | N51 | Pasir Panjang | Rosli Abd Rahman | PAS |
| Perak | P077 | Tanjong Malim | N58 | Slim | Muhammad Zulfadli Zainal | PAS |
| Pahang | P79 | Lipis | N4 | Cheka | Tuan Ibrahim Tuan Man | PAS |
| Pahang | P81 | Jerantut | N9 | Tahan | Mohd Zakhwan Ahmad Badarddin | PAS |
| Pahang | P81 | Jerantut | N10 | Damak | Zuridan Mohd Daud | PAS |
| Pahang | P81 | Jerantut | N11 | Pulau Tawar | Yohanis Ahmad | PAS |
| Pahang | P82 | Indera Mahkota | N12 | Beserah | Andansura Rabu | PAS |
| Pahang | P83 | Kuantan | N15 | Tanjung Lumpur | Rosli Abdul Jabar | PAS |
| Pahang | P84 | Paya Besar | N17 | Sungai Lembing | Mohamad Ayub Asri | PAS |
| Pahang | P84 | Paya Besar | N19 | Panching | Mohd Tarmizi Yahaya | PAS |
| Pahang | P85 | Pekan | N20 | Pulau Manis | Mohd Rafiq Khan Ahmad Khan | PAS |
| Pahang | P86 | Maran | N24 | Luit | Mohd Soffian Abd Jalil | PAS |
| Pahang | P86 | Maran | N26 | Chenor | Mujibur Rahman Ishak | PAS |
| Pahang | P87 | Jengka | N29 | Jengka | Shahril Azman Abd Halim | PAS |
| Pahang | P88 | Temerloh | N31 | Lanchang | Hassan Omar | PAS |
| Pahang | P88 | Temerloh | N32 | Kuala Semantan | Hassanudin Salim | PAS |
| Pahang | P91 | Rompin | N40 | Bukit Ibam | Nazri Ahmad | PAS |
| Selangor | P092 | Sabak Bernam | N02 | Sabak | Sallehen Mukhyi | PAS |
| Selangor | P093 | Sungai Besar | N03 | Sungai Panjang | Mohd Razali Saari | PAS |
| Selangor | P094 | Hulu Selangor | N05 | Hulu Bernam | Mui'zzuddeen Mahyuddin | PAS |
| Selangor | P095 | Tanjong Karang | N08 | Sungai Burong | Mohd Zamri Mohd Zainuldin | PAS |
| Selangor | P096 | Kuala Selangor | N11 | Ijok | Jefri Mejan | PAS |
| Selangor | P101 | Hulu Langat | N24 | Semenyih | Nushi Mahfodz | PAS |
| Selangor | P102 | Bangi | N26 | Sungai Ramal | Mohd Shafie Ngah | PAS |
| Selangor | P107 | Sungai Buloh | N38 | Paya Jaras | Ab Halim Tamuri | PAS |
| Selangor | P109 | Kapar | N43 | Sementa | Noor Najhan Mohamad Salleh | PAS |
| Selangor | P112 | Kuala Langat | N51 | Sijangkang | Ahmad Yunus Hairi | PAS |
| Negeri Sembilan | P126 | Jelebu | N04 | Klawang | Danni Rais | WAWASAN |
| Negeri Sembilan | P127 | Jempol | N5 | Serting | Mohd Fairuz Mohd Isa | PAS |
| Negeri Sembilan | P128 | Seremban | N13 | Sikamat | Razali Abu Samah | WAWASAN |
| Negeri Sembilan | P128 | Seremban | N14 | Ampangan | Mohamad Rafie Abdul Malek | PAS |
| Negeri Sembilan | P131 | Rembau | N25 | Paroi | Kamarol Ridzuan Mohd Zain | PAS |
| Negeri Sembilan | P132 | Port Dickson | N31 | Bagan Pinang | Abdul Fatah Zakaria | PAS |
| Negeri Sembilan | P133 | Tampin | N34 | Gemas | Ridzuan Ahmad | WAWASAN |
| Malacca | P136 | Tangga Batu | N13 | Paya Rumput | Rafie Ahmad | PAS |
| Malacca | P137 | Hang Tuah Jaya | N17 | Bukit Katil | Ridzuan Sarif | PAS |
| Malacca | P139 | Jasin | N24 | Bemban | Mohd Yadzil Yaakub | WAWASAN |
| Sabah | P171 | Sepanggar | N16 | Karambunai | Aliakbar Gulasan | PAS |
| Total | Perlis (5), Kedah (24), Kelantan (38), Terengganu (28), Penang (7), Perak (18), Pahang (15), Selangor (10), Negeri Sembilan (7), Malacca (3), Sabah (1) | | | | | |

== Government offices ==
=== State governments ===
- Perlis (2022–2026, 2026–present)
- Kelantan (2020–present)
- Terengganu (2020–present)
- Kedah (2020–present)
- Negeri Sembilan (2026–present)
- Malacca (2020–2021, 2026–present)
- Sabah (2020–2022)
- Perak (2020, 2020–2022)
- Johor (2020–2022)
- Pahang (2020–2022)
- Sarawak (2020–2021)

Note: bold for coalition lead, italic as junior partner

| State | Leader type | Member | Party | State Constituency |
|---|---|---|---|---|
| Kedah | Menteri Besar | Muhammad Sanusi Md Nor | PAS | Jeneri |
| Kelantan | Menteri Besar | Mohd Nassuruddin Daud | PAS | Meranti |
| Terengganu | Menteri Besar | Ahmad Samsuri Mokhtar | PAS | Ru Rendang |

| State | Leader type | Member | Party | State Constituency |
|---|---|---|---|---|
| Kelantan | Deputy Menteri Besar | Mohamed Fadzli Hassan | PAS | Temangan |

=== Legislative leadership ===
| State | Leader type | Member | Party | State Constituency |
|---|---|---|---|---|
| Kedah | Speaker | Zubir Ahmad | PAS | Non-MLA |
| Kedah | Deputy Speaker | Abdul Razak Khamis | WAWASAN | Sungai Tiang |
| Kelantan | Speaker | Mohd Amar Abdullah | PAS | Panchor |
| Kelantan | Deputy Speaker | Mohamed Farid Mohamed Zawawi | WAWASAN | Kok Lanas |
| Negeri Sembilan | Deputy Speaker | Kamarol Ridzuan Mohd Zain | PAS | Paroi |
| Perlis | Speaker | Rus’sele Eizan | PAS | Non-MLA |
| Terengganu | Speaker | Mohd. Nor Hamzah | PAS | Bukit Payung |

=== Official opposition ===
| Portfolio | Office Bearer | Party | Constituency |
|---|---|---|---|
| Leader of Opposition | Hamzah Zainudin | WAWASAN | Larut |

| State | Leader type | Member | Party | State Constituency |
|---|---|---|---|---|
| Pahang | Opposition Leader | Tuan Ibrahim Tuan Man | PAS | Cheka |
| Penang | Opposition Leader | Muhammad Fauzi Yusoff | PAS | Sungai Dua |
| Perak | Opposition Leader | Razman Zakaria | PAS | Gunong Semanggol |

== Election results ==
=== General election results ===
| Election | Total seats won | Seats contested | Share of seats | Total votes | Share of votes | Outcome of election | Election leader |
|---|---|---|---|---|---|---|---|
| 2022 | 74 / 222 | 171 | 33.33% | 4,700,819 | 30.35% | ▲41 seats; **Opposition** | Muhyiddin Yassin |

=== State election results ===
| State assembly | Election | Votes | % | Seats | Won/contested | +/– | Position | Status |
|---|---|---|---|---|---|---|---|---|
| Perlis | 2022 | 77,504 | 52.3 | 14 / 15 | 14 / 15 | ▲14 | 1st | PN |
| Kedah | 2023 | 801,380 | 68.9 | 33 / 36 | 33 / 36 | ▲33 | 1st | PN |
| Kelantan | 2023 | 589,838 | 69.2 | 43 / 45 | 43 / 45 | ▲43 | 1st | PN |
| Terengganu | 2023 | 473,027 | 68.5 | 32 / 32 | 32 / 32 | ▲32 | 1st | PN |
| Penang | 2023 | 290,514 | 32.6 | 11 / 40 | 11 / 40 | ▲11 | 2nd | Opposition |
| Perak | 2022 | 455,734 | 30.7 | 26 / 59 | 26 / 59 | ▲26 | 1st | Opposition |
| Pahang | 2022 | 338,225 | 39.0 | 17 / 42 | 17 / 42 | ▲17 | 1st | Opposition |
| Selangor | 2023 | 1,012,647 | 37.8 | 22 / 56 | 22 / 56 | ▲22 | 2nd | Opposition |
| Negeri Sembilan | 2026 | 130,407 | 20.4 | 7 / 36 | 7 / 11 | ▲2 | 3rd | BN–PN |
| Malacca | 2026 | 68,017 | 14.0 | 3 / 28 | 3 / 5 | ▲1 | 3rd | BN–PN |
| Johor | 2026 | 102,090 | 5.4 | 0 / 56 | 0 / 33 | ▼3 | 3rd | No seats |
| Sabah | 2025 | 41,584 | 3.7 | 1 / 73 | 1 / 42 | ▼16 | ▼8th | GRS–PH–BN |
| Sarawak | 2021 | 2,058 | 0.3 | 0 / 82 | 0 / 1 | Steady | 6th | No seats |

| Year | (Malaysia) DR | (Sabah) Sbh | (Sarawak) Swk | (Perlis) Pls | (Kedah) Kdh | (Kelantan) Ktn | (Terengganu) Tgu | (Penang) Png | (Perak) Prk | (Pahang) Phg | (Selangor) Sgr | (Negeri Sembilan) NS | (Malacca) Mlk | (Johor) Jhr |
|---|---|---|---|---|---|---|---|---|---|---|---|---|---|---|
| 2020 | | **17/73** | | | | | | | | | | N/A | | |
| 2021 | | | **0/82** | | | | | | | | | N/A | **2/28** | |
| 2022 | **74/222** | | **0/82** | **14/15** | | | | | **26/59** | **17/42** | | N/A | **2/28** | **3/56** |
| 2023 | **74/222** | | **0/82** | | **33/36** | **43/45** | **32/32** | **11/40** | **26/59** | **17/42** | **22/56** | 5/36 | **2/28** | **3/56** |
| 2024 | **74/222** | | **0/82** | | | | | **11/40** | **26/59** | **17/42** | **22/56** | 5/36 | **2/28** | **3/56** |
| 2025 | **74/222** | ▼1/73 | **0/82** | | | | | **11/40** | **26/59** | **17/42** | **22/56** | 5/36 | **2/28** | **3/56** |
| 2026 | **74/222** | ▼1/73 | TBD | | | | | **11/40** | **26/59** | **17/42** | **22/56** | ▲**7/36** | ▲**3/28** | ▼0/56 |
| Year | (Malaysia) DR | (Sabah) Sbh | (Sarawak) Swk | (Perlis) Pls | (Kedah) Kdh | (Kelantan) Ktn | (Terengganu) Tgu | (Penang) Png | (Perak) Prk | (Pahang) Phg | (Selangor) Sgr | (Negeri Sembilan) NS | (Malacca) Mlk | (Johor) Jhr |
**Bold** indicates best result to date. Present in legislature (in opposition) Coalition partner
