= Results of the 2023 Malaysian state elections by constituency =

Malaysian Election Results

These are the election results of the 2023 Malaysian state elections by state constituency. State assembly elections were held in Malaysia on 12 August 2023 as part of the general elections. Results are expected to come on the same day, after 6 pm. Elected members of the legislative assembly (MLAs) will be representing their constituency from the first sitting of respective state legislative assembly to its dissolution.

The state legislature election deposit was set at RM5,000 per candidate. Similar to previous elections, the election deposit will be forfeited if the particular candidate had failed to secure at least 12.5% or one-eighth of the votes.

== General results ==
State / Federal Territory	Pakatan Harapan + Barisan Nasional					Perikatan Nasional					Others / Independents				
State / Federal Territory	Votes	%	Seats	%	±!	Votes	%	Seats	%	±!	Votes	%	Seats	%	±!
Kedah	349,994	30.11	3	8.33	▼13	801,380	68.93	33	91.67	▲13	11,195	0.96	0	0.00	Steady
Kelantan	260,125	30.54	2	4.44	▼6	589,696	69.23	43	95.56	▲6	2,020	0.53	0	0.00	Steady
Negeri Sembilan	354,728	60.90	31	86.11	▼5	219,303	37.65	5	13.89	▲5	8,424	1.45	0	0.00	Steady
Penang	591,609	66.48	29	72.50	▼8	290,514	32.65	11	27.50	▲8	7,731	0.87	0	0.00	Steady
Selangor	1,621,820	60.54	34	60.71	▼15	1,012,543	37.80	22	39.29	▲15	44,495	1.66	0	0.00	Steady
Terengganu	217,484	31.48	0	0.00	▼10	472,731	68.44	32	100.00	▲10	552	0.08	0	0.00	Steady

== Kedah ==
#	Constituency	Registered Electors	Winner	Votes	Votes %	Majority	Opponent(s)	Votes	Votes %	Total valid votes	Incumbent
PN 33 | PH 3 | BN 0 | PRM 0 | Independent 0
N01	Ayer Hangat	33,156	Shamsilah Siru (PN–BERSATU)	10,701	47.31%	3,824	Safwan Hanif Shafie (IND)	6,877	30.40%	22,621	Juhari Bulat (PN–BERSATU)
N01	Ayer Hangat	33,156	Shamsilah Siru (PN–BERSATU)	10,701	47.31%	3,824	Hisham Suhaily Othman (BN–UMNO)	4,909	21.70%	22,621	Juhari Bulat (PN–BERSATU)
N01	Ayer Hangat	33,156	Shamsilah Siru (PN–BERSATU)	10,701	47.31%	3,824	Zulfadli Mohd Yusoff (IND)	134	0.59%	22,621	Juhari Bulat (PN–BERSATU)
N02	Kuah	34,694	Ahmad Pared Mahmud (PN–BERSATU)	13,364	64.34%	7,970	Mohd Fauzi Chik (PH–PKR)	5,394	25.97%	20,771	Mohd Firdaus Ahmad (PN–BERSATU)
N02	Kuah	34,694	Ahmad Pared Mahmud (PN–BERSATU)	13,364	64.34%	7,970	Mazlan Ahmad (IND)	2,013	9.69%	20,771	Mohd Firdaus Ahmad (PN–BERSATU)
N03	Kota Siputeh	29,777	Mohd Ashraf Mustaqim Badrul Munir (PN–BERSATU)	17,180	79.60%	13,090	Salmee Said (PH–AMANAH)	4,090	18.95%	21,582	Salmee Said (PH–AMANAH)
N03	Kota Siputeh	29,777	Mohd Ashraf Mustaqim Badrul Munir (PN–BERSATU)	17,180	79.60%	13,090	Abdul Ramli Latif (IND)	312	1.45%	21,582	Salmee Said (PH–AMANAH)
N04	Ayer Hitam	37,819	Azhar Ibrahim (PN–PAS)	22,078	78.34%	15,973	Hayazi Azizan (BN–UMNO)	6,105	21.66%	28,183	Azhar Ibrahim (PN–PAS)
N05	Bukit Kayu Hitam	46,054	Halimaton Shaadiah Saad (PN–BERSATU)	24,551	72.92%	15,434	Zainol Abidin Mohamad (BN–UMNO)	9,117	27.08%	33,668	Halimaton Shaadiah Saad (PN–BERSATU)
N06	Jitra	63,059	Haim Hilman Abdullah (PN–PAS)	34,342	75.46%	45,512	Sabrina Ahmad (PH–PKR)	11,170	24.54%	45,512	Mukhriz Mahathir (PEJUANG)
N07	Kuala Nerang	31,481	Mohamad Yusoff Zakaria (PN–PAS)	19,661	82.35%	15,446	Rizwan Abu Bakar (PH–AMANAH)	4,215	17.65%	23,876	Mohamad Yusoff Zakaria (PN–PAS)
N08	Pedu	28,606	Mohd Radzi Md Amin (PN–PAS)	14,397	64.21%	6,373	Mahdzir Khalid (BN–UMNO)	8,024	35.79%	22,421	Mohd Radzi Md Amin (PN–PAS)
N09	Bukit Lada	40,729	Salim Mahmood (PN–PAS)	24,183	78.12%	17,411	Said Ali Syed Rastan (BN–UMNO)	6,772	21.88%	30,955	Salim Mahmood (PN–PAS)
N10	Bukit Pinang	36,791	Wan Romani Wan Salim (PN–PAS)	23,041	82.82%	18,261	Hazir Mat Zain (PH–PKR)	4,780	17.18%	27,821	Wan Romani Wan Salim (PN–PAS)
N11	Derga	37,738	Muhammad Amri Wahab (PN–BERSATU)	14,433	56.72%	3,662	Tan Kok Yew (PH–DAP)	10,771	42.33%	25,445	Tan Kok Yew (PH–DAP)
N11	Derga	37,738	Muhammad Amri Wahab (PN–BERSATU)	14,433	56.72%	3,662	Noor Azman Basharon (IND)	241	0.95%	25,445	Tan Kok Yew (PH–DAP)
N12	Suka Menanti	41,957	Dzowahir Ab Ghani (PN–BERSATU)	18,396	64.44%	8,245	Zamri Yusuf (PH–PKR)	10,151	35.56%	28,547	Zamri Yusuf (PH–PKR)
N13	Kota Darul Aman	25,829	Teh Swee Leong (PH–DAP)	11,178	66.91%	5,650	Chuah See Seng (PN–GERAKAN)	5,528	33.09%	16,706	Teh Swee Leong (PH–DAP)
N14	Alor Mengkudu	38,193	Muhamad Radhi Mat Din (PN–PAS)	18,936	68.19%	10,104	Mahfuz Omar (PH–AMANAH)	8,832	31.81%	27,768	Phahrolrazi Mohd Zawawi (PH–PKR)
N15	Anak Bukit	36,491	Rashidi Abdul Razak (PN–PAS)	21,738	78.63%	15,831	Nor Hasita Md. Isa (BN–UMNO)	5,907	21.37%	27,645	Amiruddin Hamzah (PEJUANG)
N16	Kubang Rotan	50,233	Mohd Salleh Saidin (PN–BERSATU)	22,951	65.36%	10,786	Mohd Asmirul Anuar Aris (PH–AMANAH)	12,165	34.64%	35,116	Mohd Asmirul Anuar Aris (PH–AMANAH)
N17	Pengkalan Kundor	46,235	Mardhiyyah Johari (PN–PAS)	22,349	66.38%	11,032	Ismail Salleh (PH–AMANAH)	11,317	33.62%	33,666	Ismail Salleh (PH–AMANAH)
N18	Tokai	45,374	Mohd Hayati Othman (PN–PAS)	29,329	84.43%	23,919	Zainal Abidin Saad (PH–AMANAH)	5,410	15.57%	34,739	Mohd Hayati Othman (PN–PAS)
N19	Sungai Tiang	49,414	Abdul Razak Khamis (PN–BERSATU)	27,154	72.98%	17,099	Mohamad Fadzil Zolkipli (BN–UMNO)	10,055	27.02%	37,209	Suraya Yaacob (BN–UMNO)
N20	Sungai Limau	34,283	Mohd Azam Abd Samat (PN–PAS)	23,000	84.88%	18,904	Siti Balkhis Husain (PH–AMANAH)	4,096	15.12%	27,096	Mohd Azam Abd Samat (PN–PAS)
N21	Guar Chempedak	30,085	Abdul Ghafar Saad (PN–BERSATU)	17,266	76.40%	12,109	Abdul Paris Abdul Hamid (BN–UMNO)	5,157	22.82%	22,599	Ku Abdul Rahman Ku Ismail (PN–BERSATU)
N21	Guar Chempedak	30,085	Abdul Ghafar Saad (PN–BERSATU)	17,266	76.40%	12,109	Ku Abdul Halim Ku Ismail (IND)	176	0.78%	22,599	Ku Abdul Rahman Ku Ismail (PN–BERSATU)
N22	Gurun	40,941	Baddrol Bakhtiar (PN–PAS)	17,771	61.37%	6,584	Mohammed Firdaus Johari (PH–PKR)	11,187	38.63%	28,958	VAC
N23	Belantek	40,941	Ahmad Sulaiman (PN–PAS)	17,782	83.06%	14,156	Mazli Saipi (PH–AMANAH)	3,626	16.94%	21,408	VAC
N24	Jeneri	35,097	Muhammad Sanusi Md Nor (PN–PAS)	21,823	79.08%	16,050	Muhamad Khizri Abu Kassim (BN–UMNO)	5,773	20.92%	27,596	Muhammad Sanusi Md Nor (PN–PAS)
N25	Bukit Selambau	79,518	Azizan Hamzah (PN–PAS)	33,508	60.13%	11,665	Summugam Rengasamy (PH–PKR)	21,843	39.20%	55,726	Summugam Rengasamy (PH–PKR)
N25	Bukit Selambau	79,518	Azizan Hamzah (PN–PAS)	33,508	60.13%	11,665	Dinesh Muniandy (IND)	375	0.67%	55,726	Summugam Rengasamy (PH–PKR)
N26	Tanjong Dawai	54,629	Hanif Ghazali (PN–PAS)	31,996	76.94%	22,405	Shaiful Hazizy Zainol Abidin (BN–UMNO)	9,591	23.06%	41,587	Hanif Ghazali (PN–PAS)
N27	Pantai Merdeka	51,502	Sharir Long (PN–PAS)	32,225	79.06%	23,691	Wan Mohalina Wan Mohamad (BN–UMNO)	8,534	20.94%	40,759	Ahmad Fadzli Hashim (PN–PAS)
N28	Bakar Arang	57,867	Adam Loh Wee Chai (PH–PKR)	21,889	54.41%	3,683	Tai Kuang Tee (PN–GERAKAN)	18,206	45.25%	40,233	Simon Ooi Tze Min (PH–PKR)
N28	Bakar Arang	57,867	Adam Loh Wee Chai (PH–PKR)	21,889	54.41%	3,683	Tan Kee Chye (PRM)	138	0.34%	40,233	Simon Ooi Tze Min (PH–PKR)
N29	Sidam	60,983	Bau Wong Bau Eng (PH–PKR)	21,859	51.12%	954	Juliana Abdul Ghani (PN–BERSATU)	20,905	48.88%	42,764	Robert Ling Kui Ee (PN–BERSATU)
N30	Bayu	47,613	Mohd Taufik Yaacob (PN–BERSATU)	27,287	73.76%	17,582	Ishak Mat (BN–UMNO)	9,705	26.24%	36,992	Abd Nasir Idris (PN–PAS)
N31	Kupang	42,720	Najmi Ahmad (PN–PAS)	26,366	78.81%	19,275	Muhammad Suhaimi Hamzah (PH–AMANAH)	7,091	21.19%	33,457	Najmi Ahmad (PN–PAS)
N32	Kuala Ketil	42,184	Mansor Zakaria (PN–PAS)	24,872	74.96%	16,565	Suriati Che Mid (BN–UMNO)	8,307	25.04%	33,179	Mansor Zakaria (PN–PAS)
N33	Merbau Pulas	53,323	Siti Ashah Ghazali (PN–PAS)	29,919	73.78%	19,285	Asmadi Abu Talib (BN–UMNO)	10,634	26.22%	40,553	Siti Ashah Ghazali (PN–PAS)
N34	Lunas	82,212	Khairul Anuar Ramli (PN–BERSATU)	31,537	52.99%	4,483	Shamsul Anuar Abdullah (PH–PKR)	27,054	45.45%	59,520	Azman Nasrudin (PN–BERSATU)
N34	Lunas	82,212	Khairul Anuar Ramli (PN–BERSATU)	31,537	52.99%	4,483	Arichindarem Sinappayen (IND)	417	0.70%	59,520	Azman Nasrudin (PN–BERSATU)
N34	Lunas	82,212	Khairul Anuar Ramli (PN–BERSATU)	31,537	52.99%	4,483	Rajendaran Nadarajan (IND)	364	0.61%	59,520	Azman Nasrudin (PN–BERSATU)
N34	Lunas	82,212	Khairul Anuar Ramli (PN–BERSATU)	31,537	52.99%	4,483	Pannir Selvam S Suppiah (IND)	148	0.25%	59,520	Azman Nasrudin (PN–BERSATU)
N35	Kulim	54,169	Wong Chia Zhen (PN–GERAKAN)	23,278	59.97%	7,742	Teh Lean Ong (PH–PKR)	15,536	40.03%	38,814	Yeo Keng Chuan (PH–PKR)
N36	Bandar Baharu	36,164	Mohd Suffian Yusoff (PN–PAS)	19,327	71.38%	11,577	Nuraini Yusoff (BN–UMNO)	7,750	28.62%	27,077	Norsabrina Mohd. Noor (BN–UMNO)

== Kelantan ==
#	Constituency	Registered Electors	Winner	Votes	Votes %	Majority	Opponent(s)	Votes	Votes %	Total valid votes	Incumbent
PN 43 | BN 1 | PH 1 | PRM 0 | Independent 0
N01	Pengkalan Kubor	36,492	Wan Roslan Wan Hamat (PN–PAS)	14,043	63.70%	6,040	Zulkifli Abdullah (BN–UMNO)	8,003	36.30%	22,046	Wan Roslan Wan Hamat (PN–PAS)
N02	Kelaboran	38,198	Mohd Adanan Hassan (PN–PAS)	15,890	70.91%	9,372	Mohd Rosdi Razali (BN–UMNO)	6,518	29.09%	22,408	Mohd Adanan Hassan (PN–PAS)
N03	Pasir Pekan	39,119	Ahmad Yakob (PN–PAS)	18,783	75.88%	12,811	Zaman Sahri Ibrahim (PH–PKR)	5,972	24.12%	24,755	Ahmad Yakob (PN–PAS)
N04	Wakaf Bharu	36,439	Mohd Rusli Abdullah (PN–PAS)	15,522	67.73%	8,127	Abdul Mannan Md Said (BN–UMNO)	7,395	32.27%	22,917	Mohd Rusli Abdullah (PN–PAS)
N05	Kijang	30,405	Izani Husin (PN–PAS)	14,552	75.81%	9,908	Haris Hussin (BN–UMNO)	4,644	24.19%	19,196	Izani Husin (PN–PAS)
N06	Chempaka	34,641	Nik Asma' Bahrum Nik Abdullah (PN–PAS)	16,728	74.46%	11,224	Nik Normi Nik Ayub (BN–UMNO)	5,504	24.50%	22,466	Ahmad Fathan Mahmood (PN–PAS)
N06	Chempaka	34,641	Nik Asma' Bahrum Nik Abdullah (PN–PAS)	16,728	74.46%	11,224	Ibrahim Sulong (IND)	234	1.04%	22,466	Ahmad Fathan Mahmood (PN–PAS)
N07	Panchor	42,768	Mohd Amar Abdullah (PN–PAS)	18,700	70.00%	10,686	Syed Mohd Alidustur Syed Mohd Zain (PH–PKR)	8,014	30.00%	26,714	Mohd Amar Abdullah (PN–PAS)
N08	Tanjong Mas	45,579	Rohani Ibrahim (PN–PAS)	17,529	66.23%	8,593	Zinda Khalil Sastro Hassan (PH–PKR)	8,936	33.77%	26,465	Rohani Ibrahim (PN–PAS)
N09	Kota Lama	33,043	Hafidzah Mustakim (PH–AMANAH)	9,691	49.97%	202	Zamri Ismail (PN–PAS)	9,489	48.94%	19,391	Tan Teng Loon @ Anuar Tan Abdullah (PN–PAS)
N09	Kota Lama	33,043	Hafidzah Mustakim (PH–AMANAH)	9,691	49.97%	202	Andy Tan Boon Kian (PRM)	126	0.65%	19,391	Tan Teng Loon @ Anuar Tan Abdullah (PN–PAS)
N09	Kota Lama	33,043	Hafidzah Mustakim (PH–AMANAH)	9,691	49.97%	202	Izat Bukhary Ismail Bukhary (IND)	85	0.44%	19,391	Tan Teng Loon @ Anuar Tan Abdullah (PN–PAS)
N10	Bunut Payong	36,844	Shaari Mat Yaman (PN–PAS)	13,887	62.66%	5,610	Mohamed Hasnan Che Hussin (BN–UMNO)	8,277	37.34%	22,164	Ramli Mamat (PN–PAS)
N11	Tendong	31,768	Rozi Muhammad (PN–PAS)	12,360	61.92%	5,846	Noor Hariri Mohamed Noor (BN–UMNO)	6,514	32.64%	19,960	Rozi Muhammad (PN–PAS)
N11	Tendong	31,768	Rozi Muhammad (PN–PAS)	12,360	61.92%	5,846	Suzainal Adnan Sukri (IND)	1,086	5.44%	19,960	Rozi Muhammad (PN–PAS)
N12	Pengkalan Pasir	33,007	Mohamad Nasriff Daud Yatimee (PN–PAS)	13,077	70.71%	7,661	Rushdan Mustafa (PH–AMANAH)	5,416	29.29%	18,493	Hanifa Ahmad (PN–PAS)
N13	Meranti	29,980	Mohd. Nassuruddin Daud (PN–PAS)	13,260	76.36%	9,154	Zahari Omar (BN–UMNO)	4,106	23.64%	17,366	Mohd. Nassuruddin Daud (PN–PAS)
N14	Chetok	29,111	Zuraidin Abdullah (PN–PAS)	12,202	74.38%	7,999	Mohamad Ezzat Zahrim Hanuzi (PH–PKR)	4,203	25.62%	16,405	Zuraidin Abdullah (PN–PAS)
N15	Gual Periok	36,081	Kamaruzaman Mohamad (PN–PAS)	11,557	64.19%	5,109	Anuar Mohamad (BN–UMNO)	6,448	35.81%	18,005	Mohamad Awang (PN–PAS)
N16	Apam Putra	28,834	Zamakhsari Muhamad (PN–PAS)	10,606	61.12%	3,859	Akbar Salim (BN–UMNO)	6,747	38.88%	17,353	Abdul Rasul Mohamed (PN–PAS)
N17	Salor	36,294	Saizol Ismail (PN–PAS)	15,893	71.19%	9,460	Mohamad Husain (BN–UMNO)	6,433	28.81%	22,326	Saiful Adli Abu Bakar (PN–PAS)
N18	Pasir Tumboh	37,498	Abd Rahman Yunus (PN–PAS)	17,814	76.61%	12,374	Naziratul Aini Mohd Sayuty (PH–PKR)	5,440	23.39%	23,254	Abd Rahman Yunus (PN–BERSATU)
N19	Demit	40,561	Mohd Asri Mat Daud (PN–PAS)	23,254	75.39%	12,585	Ismail Ghani (PH–AMANAH)	6,098	24.61%	24,781	Mumtaz Md. Nawi (PN–PAS)
N20	Tawang	43,441	Harun Ismail (PN–PAS)	21,665	79.22%	15,982	Che Mat Isa Che Dir (PH–AMANAH)	5,683	20.78%	27,348	Hassan Mohamood (PN–PAS)
N21	Pantai Irama	40,512	Mohd Huzaimy Che Husin (PN–PAS)	17,779	70.81%	10,449	Zakiah Md Noor (BN–UMNO)	7,330	29.19%	25,109	Mohd Huzaimy Che Husin (PN–PAS)
N22	Jelawat	40,012	Zameri Mat Nawang (PN–PAS)	16,885	69.09%	9,608	Yusri Che Noh (BN–UMNO)	7,277	29.78%	24,439	Abdul Azziz Kadir (PN–PAS)
N22	Jelawat	40,012	Zameri Mat Nawang (PN–PAS)	16,885	69.09%	9,608	Zulkarnain Haron (IND)	277	1.13%	24,439	Abdul Azziz Kadir (PN–PAS)
N23	Melor	28,387	Wan Rohimi Wan Daud (PN–PAS)	12,688	70.13%	7,283	Azmi Ishak (BN–UMNO)	5,405	29.87%	18,093	VAC
N24	Kadok	21,833	Azami Md. Nor (PN–PAS)	10,442	75.95%	7,135	Mohd Azizan Razak (PH–AMANAH)	3,307	24.05%	13,749	Azami Md. Nor (PN–PAS)
N25	Kok Lanas	35,679	Mohamed Farid Mohamed Zawawi (PN–BERSATU)	15,478	68.07%	8,219	Ahmad Deraman (BN–UMNO)	7,259	31.93%	22,737	Md Alwi Che Ahmad (BN–UMNO)
N26	Bukit Panau	50,237	Abdul Fattah Mahmood (PN–PAS)	22,582	79.14%	16,628	Samsu Adabi Mamat (PH–AMANAH)	5,954	20.86%	28,536	Abdul Fattah Mahmood (PN–PAS)
N27	Gual Ipoh	25,718	Bahari Mohamad Nor (PN–BERSATU)	10,320	70.26%	5,952	Zuhairi Zakaria (BN–UMNO)	4,368	29.74%	14,688	Bakri Mustapha (BN–UMNO)
N28	Kemahang	23,258	Md. Anizam Ab. Rahman (PN–PAS)	10,375	77.20%	7,311	Mazli Mustafa (BN–UMNO)	3,064	22.80%	13,439	Md. Anizam Ab. Rahman (PN–PAS)
N29	Selising	28,725	Tuan Mohd Saripuddin Tuan Ismail (PN–PAS)	12,481	69.11%	6,903	Hashim Ismail (BN–UMNO)	5,578	30.89%	18,059	Tuan Mohd Saripuddin Tuan Ismail (PN–PAS)
N30	Limbongan	35,393	Nor Asilah Mohamed Zin (PN–PAS)	15,183	73.04%	9,580	Kamaruddin Mat Zin (PH–PKR)	5,603	26.96%	20,786	Mohd Nazlan Mohamed Hasbullah (PN–PAS)
N31	Semerak	26,781	Nor Sham Sulaiman (PN–PAS)	11,531	66.91%	5,828	Marshella Ali (BN–UMNO)	5,703	33.09%	17,234	Wan Hassan Wan Ibrahim (PN–PAS)
N32	Gaal	22,671	Mohd Rodzi Ja'afar (PN–PAS)	10,388	72.65%	6,477	Mohd Aliff Nasrol Mat Nasin (BN–UMNO)	3,911	27.35%	14,299	Mohd Rodzi Ja'afar (PN–PAS)
N33	Pulai Chondong	28,169	Azhar Salleh (PN–PAS)	11,636	67.51%	6,037	Muhammad Fakhran Che Jusoh (BN–UMNO)	5,599	32.49%	17,235	Azhar Salleh (PN–PAS)
N34	Temangan	26,012	Mohamed Fadzli Hassan (PN–PAS)	11,446	73.25%	7,479	Abdul Kadir Othman (PH–AMANAH)	3,967	25.39%	15,625	Mohamed Fadzli Hassan (PN–PAS)
N34	Temangan	26,012	Mohamed Fadzli Hassan (PN–PAS)	11,446	73.25%	7,479	Fauzi Seman (IND)	212	1.36%	15,625	Mohamed Fadzli Hassan (PN–PAS)
N35	Kemuning	35,015	Ahmad Zakhran Mat Noor (PN–PAS)	13,168	63.77%	5,687	Mohd Fakaarudin Ismail (BN–UMNO)	7,481	36.23%	20,649	Mohd Roseli Ismail (PN–PAS)
N36	Bukit Bunga	21,722	Mohd Almidi Jaafar (PN–BERSATU)	8,540	66.06%	4,152	Mohd Adhan Kechik (BN–UMNO)	4,388	33.94%	12,928	Mohd Adhan Kechik (BN–UMNO)
N37	Ayer Lanas	22,468	Kamarudin Md Nor (PN–BERSATU)	9,535	67.81%	5,009	Nasrul Hadi Kamarulzaman (BN–UMNO)	4,526	32.19%	14,061	Mustapa Mohamed (PN–BERSATU)
N38	Kuala Balah	15,704	Abdul Hadi Awang Kechil (PN–PAS)	6,186	63.31%	2,601	Mohammad Yamiin Anuar Mat Zain (BN–UMNO)	3,585	36.69%	9,771	Abd Aziz Derashid (BN–UMNO)
N39	Mengkebang	26,843	Zubir Abu Bakar (PN–PAS)	12,531	78.64%	9,127	Mohd Shukri Ishak (PH–PKR)	3,404	21.36%	15,935	Muhammad Mat Sulaiman (PN–PAS)
N40	Guchil	27,785	Hilmi Abdullah (PN–PAS)	10,826	70.49%	6,294	Zuber Hasan (BN–UMNO)	4,532	29.51%	15,358	Hilmi Abdullah (PN–PAS)
N41	Manek Urai	22,611	Mohd Fauzi Abdullah (PN–PAS)	10,355	78.33%	7,490	Suzali Adlina Sukri (BN–UMNO)	2,865	21.67%	13,220	Mohd Fauzi Abdullah (PN–PAS)
N42	Dabong	15,255	Ku Mohd Zaki Ku Hussien (PN–PAS)	5,772	63.44%	2,446	Ahmad Firdaus Muhammad (BN–UMNO)	3,326	36.56%	9,098	Ku Mohd Zaki Ku Hussien (PN–PAS)
N43	Nenggiri	20,219	Mohd Azizi Abu Naim (PN–BERSATU)	6,517	53.31%	810	Ab Aziz Yusoff (BN–UMNO)	5,707	46.69%	12,224	Ab Aziz Yusoff (BN–UMNO)
N44	Paloh	21,162	Shaari Mat Hussain (PN–BERSATU)	7,407	58.74%	2,205	Amran Arifin (BN–UMNO)	5,202	41.26%	12,609	Amran Arifin (BN–UMNO)
N45	Galas	29,638	Mohd Syahbuddin Hashim (BN–UMNO)	10,742	59.19%	3,337	Mohd Tarmizi Abdul Rahman (PN–PAS)	7,405	40.81%	18,147	Mohd Syahbuddin Hashim (BN–UMNO)

== Terengganu ==
#	Constituency	Registered Electors	Winner	Votes	Votes %	Majority	Opponent(s)	Votes	Votes %	Total valid votes	Incumbent
PN 32 | BN 0 | PH 0 | MUDA 0 | Independent 0
N01	Kuala Besut	26,992	Azbi Salleh (PN–PAS)	11,496	60.91%	4,119	Tengku Zaihan Che Ku Abd Rahman (BN–UMNO)	7,377	39.09%	18,873	Tengku Zaihan Che Ku Abd Rahman (BN–UMNO)
N02	Kota Putera	32,792	Mohd Nurkhuzaini Ab Rahman (PN–PAS)	13,360	58.31%	3,809	Muhammad Pehimi Yusof (BN–UMNO)	9,551	41.69%	22,911	Mohd Nurkhuzaini Ab Rahman (PN–PAS)
N03	Jertih	29,088	Riduan Mohd Nor (PN–PAS)	12,122	62.10%	4,723	Mohd Rozaini Mohd Rasli (BN–UMNO)	7,399	37.90%	19,521	Muhammad Pehimi Yusof (BN–UMNO)
N04	Hulu Besut	23,846	Mohd Husaimi Hussin (PN–BERSATU)	9,525	58.19%	2,860	Nawi Mohamad (BN–UMNO)	6,665	40.71%	16,370	Nawi Mohamad (BN–UMNO)
N04	Hulu Besut	23,846	Mohd Husaimi Hussin (PN–BERSATU)	9,525	58.19%	2,860	Che Harun Kamariah (IND)	180	1.10%	16,370	Nawi Mohamad (BN–UMNO)
N05	Jabi	25,192	Azman Ibrahim (PN–PAS)	11,523	62.73%	4,676	Rosdi Zakaria (BN–UMNO)	6,847	37.27%	18,370	Azman Ibrahim (PN–PAS)
N06	Permaisuri	30,739	Mohd Yusop Majid (PN–BERSATU)	14,837	67.03%	7,538	Hamdan Hamzah (BN–UMNO)	7,299	32.97%	22,136	Abd Halim Jusoh (BN–UMNO)
N07	Langkap	22,439	Azmi Maarof (PN–PAS)	9,553	58.35%	2,734	Sabri Mohd Noor (BN–UMNO)	6,819	41.65%	16,372	Sabri Mohd Noor (BN–UMNO)
N08	Batu Rakit	29,919	Mohd Shafizi Ismail (PN–PAS)	14,465	63.14%	6,019	Bazlan Abd Rahman (BN–UMNO)	8,446	36.86%	22,911	Bazlan Abd Rahman (BN–UMNO)
N09	Tepuh	30,448	Hishamuddin Abdul Karim (PN–PAS)	17,049	73.47%	10,894	Muhammad Hanafi Hasan (BN–UMNO)	6,155	26.53%	23,204	Hishamuddin Abdul Karim (PN–PAS)
N10	Buluh Gading	27,845	Ridhuan Hashim (PN–PAS)	16,213	73.50%	10,366	Omar Adam (BN–UMNO)	5,847	26.50%	22,060	Ridhuan Hashim (PN–PAS)
N11	Seberang Takir	27,733	Khazan Che Mat (PN–BERSATU)	12,156	56.50%	2,797	Ahmad Razif Abdul Rahman (BN–UMNO)	9,359	43.50%	21,515	Ahmad Razif Abdul Rahman (BN–UMNO)
N12	Bukit Tunggal	21,055	Zaharudin Zahid (PN–PAS)	12,066	73.52%	7,721	Wan Noorislam Wan Hashim (BN–UMNO)	4,345	26.48%	21,055	Alias Razak (PN–PAS)
N13	Wakaf Mempelam	34,509	Wan Sukairi Wan Abdullah (PN–PAS)	22,345	85.73%	18,627	Wan Mohd Haikal Wan Ghazali (PH–PKR)	3,718	14.27%	26,063	Wan Sukairi Wan Abdullah (PN–PAS)
N14	Bandar	22,057	Ahmad Shah Muhamed (PN–PAS)	8,438	56.69%	2,364	Armi Irzan Mohd (BN–UMNO)	6,074	40.81%	14,884	Ahmad Shah Muhamed (PN–PAS)
N14	Bandar	22,057	Ahmad Shah Muhamed (PN–PAS)	8,438	56.69%	2,364	Luqman Long (MUDA)	372	2.50%	14,884	Ahmad Shah Muhamed (PN–PAS)
N15	Ladang	26,250	Zuraida Md Noor (PN–PAS)	11,663	61.54%	4,373	Mohd Sabri Alwi (BN–UMNO)	7,290	38.46%	18,953	Tengku Hassan Tengku Omar (PN–PAS)
N16	Batu Buruk	40,759	Muhammad Khalil Abdul Hadi (PN–PAS)	23,767	79.58%	17,668	Mohamad Zamir Ghazali (PH–AMANAH)	6,099	20.42%	29,866	Muhammad Khalil Abdul Hadi (PN–PAS)
N17	Alur Limbat	36,087	Ariffin Deraman (PN–PAS)	20,133	72.92%	12,656	Yuseri Isa (BN–UMNO)	7,477	27.08%	27,610	Ariffin Deraman (PN–PAS)
N18	Bukit Payung	28,823	Mohd Nor Hamzah (PN–PAS)	16,838	74.11%	10,956	Mohd Khim @ Mohd Khan Abdul Rahman (BN–UMNO)	5,882	25.89%	22,720	Mohd Nor Hamzah (PN–PAS)
N19	Ru Rendang	32,867	Ahmad Samsuri Mokhtar (PN–PAS)	20,927	85.18%	17,286	Suhaimi Sulaiman (PH–AMANAH)	3,641	14.82%	24,568	Ahmad Samsuri Mokhtar (PN–PAS)
N20	Pengkalan Berangan	35,248	Sulaiman Sulong (PN–PAS)	17,946	64.98%	8,276	Nik Dir Nik Wan Ku (BN–UMNO)	9,670	35.02%	27,616	Sulaiman Sulong (PN–PAS)
N21	Telemung	21,495	Mohd Zawawi Ismail (PN–BERSATU)	8,380	50.90%	295	Rozi Mamat (BN–UMNO)	8,085	49.10%	16,465	Rozi Mamat (BN–UMNO)
N22	Manir	20,639	Hilmi Harun (PN–PAS)	13,471	85.90%	11,260	Eka Lisut (PH–PKR)	2,211	14.10%	15,682	Hilmi Harun (PN–PAS)
N23	Kuala Berang	21,428	Mamad Puteh (PN–PAS)	11,270	67.80%	5,917	Jalaludin Ismail (BN–UMNO)	5,353	32.20%	16,623	Mamad Puteh (PN–PAS)
N24	Ajil	24,922	Maliaman Kassim (PN–PAS)	12,362	66.94%	6,258	Jailani Johari (BN–UMNO)	6,104	33.06%	18,466	Maliaman Kassim (PN–PAS)
N25	Bukit Besi	18,195	Ghazali Sulaiman (PN–PAS)	8,552	63.86%	3,712	Din Adam (BN–UMNO)	4,840	36.14%	13,392	Roslee Daud (BN–UMNO)
N26	Rantau Abang	33,394	Mohd Fadhli Rahmi Zulkifli (PN–PAS)	18,959	75.85%	12,922	Mohd Asri Mohamad (BN–UMNO)	6,037	24.15%	24,996	Alias Harun (PN–PAS)
N27	Sura	30,206	Tengku Muhammad Fakhruddin Tengku Md Fauzi (PN–PAS)	17,395	83.06%	13,848	Osman Umar (PH–PKR)	3,547	16.94%	20,942	Wan Hapandi Wan Nik (PN–PAS)
N28	Paka	34,839	Satiful Bahri Mamat (PN–PAS)	18,681	73.30%	11,876	Ahmad Abdullah Abd Wahab (BN–UMNO)	6,805	26.70%	25,486	Satiful Bahri Mamat (PN–PAS)
N29	Kemasik	28,618	Saiful Azmi Suhaili (PN–PAS)	13,778	65.45%	6,505	Muhammad Khairi Afiq Mohd Yusof (BN–UMNO)	7,273	34.55%	21,051	Saiful Azmi Suhaili (PN–PAS)
N30	Kijal	29,491	Razali Idris (PN–BERSATU)	13,403	58.15%	3,758	Ahmad Said (BN–UMNO)	9,645	41.85%	23,048	Ahmad Said (BN–UMNO)
N31	Cukai	39,153	Hanafiah Mat (PN–PAS)	18,394	64.13%	8,106	Mohamed Rahim Hussin (BN–UMNO)	10,288	35.87%	28,682	Hanafiah Mat (PN–PAS)
N32	Air Putih	43,826	Mohd Hafiz Adam (PN–PAS)	21,664	65.65%	10,328	Mohd Zaki Salleh (BN–UMNO)	11,336	34.35%	33,000	Ab Razak Ibrahim (PN–PAS)

== Penang ==
#	Constituency	Registered Electors	Winner	Votes	Votes %	Majority	Opponent(s)	Votes	Votes %	Total valid votes	Incumbent
PH 27 | PN 11 | BN 2 | MUDA 0 | PRM 0 | PFP 0 | Independent 0
N01	Penaga	25,468	Mohd Yusni Mat Piah (PN–PAS)	13,223	63.24%	5,537	Mohd Naim Salleh (BN–UMNO)	7,686	36.76%	20,909	Mohd Yusni Mat Piah (PN–PAS)
N02	Bertam	23,999	Reezal Merican Naina Merican (BN–UMNO)	10,453	56.24%	2,321	Khalib Mehtab Mohd Ishaq (PN–BERSATU)	8,132	43.76%	18,585	VAC
N03	Pinang Tunggal	34,723	Bukhori Ghazali (PN–PAS)	17,060	62.74%	6,928	Zainuddin Mohamad (PH–PKR)	10,132	37.26%	27,192	Ahmad Zakiyuddin Abdul Rahman (PH–PKR)
N04	Permatang Berangan	28,519	Mohamad Sobri Saleh (PN–PAS)	15,950	69.50%	8,949	Nor Hafizah Othman (BN–UMNO)	7,001	30.50%	22,951	Nor Hafizah Othman (BN–UMNO)
N05	Sungai Dua	28,100	Muhammad Fauzi Yusoff (PN–PAS)	13,988	62.26%	5,509	Shaik Hussein Mydin (BN–UMNO)	8,479	37.74%	22,467	Muhamad Yusoff Mohd Noor (BN–UMNO)
N06	Telok Ayer Tawar	24,784	Azmi Alang (PN–BERSATU)	10,223	55.26%	1,947	Abdul Mohsein Mohd. Shariff (PH–PKR)	8,276	44.74%	18,499	Mustafa Kamal Ahmad (PH–PKR)
N07	Sungai Puyu	35,904	Phee Syn Tze (PH–DAP)	23,838	90.48%	21,330	Andrew Teow Chin Siang (PN–PAS)	2,508	9.52%	26,346	Phee Boon Poh (PH–DAP)
N08	Bagan Jermal	32,529	Chee Yeeh Keen (PH–DAP)	19,687	84.77%	16,149	Ong Chuan Jin (PN–BERSATU)	3,538	15.23%	23,225	Soon Lip Chee (PH–DAP)
N09	Bagan Dalam	21,221	Kumaran Krishnan (PH–DAP)	10,506	71.49%	7,542	Jayaraman Kunchu Kannu (PN–PAS)	2,964	20.17%	14,696	Satees Muniandy (PH–DAP)
N09	Bagan Dalam	21,221	Kumaran Krishnan (PH–DAP)	10,506	71.49%	7,542	Satees Muniandy (IND)	1,111	7.56%	14,696	Satees Muniandy (PH–DAP)
N09	Bagan Dalam	21,221	Kumaran Krishnan (PH–DAP)	10,506	71.49%	7,542	Rajasakanan Sinnakannu (PFP)	115	0.78%	14,696	Satees Muniandy (PH–DAP)
N10	Seberang Jaya	49,215	Izhar Shah Arif Shah (PN–BERSATU)	20,877	56.69%	4,926	Johari Kassim (PH–PKR)	15,951	43.31%	36,828	VAC
N11	Permatang Pasir	30,464	Amir Hamzah Abdul Hashim (PN–PAS)	13,526	56.49%	3,108	Muhammad Faiz Fadzil (PH–AMANAH)	10,418	43.51%	23,944	Muhammad Faiz Fadzil (PH–AMANAH)
N12	Penanti	28,170	Zulkifli Bakar (PN–BERSATU)	12,586	58.28%	3,575	Rohsidi Hussain (PH–PKR)	9,011	41.72%	21,597	Norlela Ariffin (PH–PKR)
N13	Berapit	29,076	Heng Lee Lee (PH–DAP)	19,183	94.44%	18,053	Lee Kok Keong (PN–GERAKAN)	1,130	5.56%	20,313	Heng Lee Lee (PH–DAP)
N14	Machang Bubok	56,538	Lee Khai Loon (PH–PKR)	28,777	69.12%	15,922	Tan Hum Wei (PN–GERAKAN)	12,855	30.88%	41,632	Lee Khai Loon (PH–PKR)
N15	Padang Lalang	36,001	Gooi Zi Sen (PH–DAP)	22,315	87.85%	19,448	Suresh Devaraj Naidu (PN–BERSATU)	2,867	11.29%	25,400	Chong Eng (PH–DAP)
N15	Padang Lalang	36,001	Gooi Zi Sen (PH–DAP)	22,315	87.85%	19,448	Ooi Khar Giap (PFP)	218	0.86%	25,400	Chong Eng (PH–DAP)
N16	Perai	20,479	Sundarajoo Somu (PH–DAP)	10,680	76.76%	9,139	Sivasuntaram Rajalinggam (PN–GERAKAN)	1,541	11.08%	13,931	Ramasamy Palanisamy (PH–DAP)
N16	Perai	20,479	Sundarajoo Somu (PH–DAP)	10,680	76.76%	9,139	David Marshel Pakianathan (IND)	1.439	10.34%	13,931	Ramasamy Palanisamy (PH–DAP)
N16	Perai	20,479	Sundarajoo Somu (PH–DAP)	10,680	76.76%	9,139	Vikneswary Harikrishnan (MUDA)	253	1.82%	13,931	Ramasamy Palanisamy (PH–DAP)
N17	Bukit Tengah	31,635	Gooi Hsiao Leung (PH–PKR)	16,050	68.58%	8,697	Baljit Singh Jigiri Singh (PN–GERAKAN)	7,353	31.42%	23,403	Gooi Hsiao Leung (PH–PKR)
N18	Bukit Tambun	37,496	Goh Choon Aik (PH–PKR)	21,985	80.64%	17,175	Tan Gia Wei (PN–GERAKAN)	4,810	17.64%	27,283	Goh Choon Aik (PH–PKR)
N18	Bukit Tambun	37,496	Goh Choon Aik (PH–PKR)	21,985	80.64%	17,175	Somuganathan Muniandy (IND)	468	1.72%	27,283	Goh Choon Aik (PH–PKR)
N19	Jawi	36,601	H’ng Mooi Lye (PH–DAP)	20,641	79.50%	15,319	Steven Koh Tien Yew (PN–PAS)	5,322	20.50%	25,963	H’ng Mooi Lye (PH–DAP)
N20	Sungai Bakap	38,409	Nor Zamri Latiff (PN–PAS)	15,433	52.67%	1,563	Nurhidayah Che Rus (PH–PKR)	13,870	47.33%	29,303	Amar Pritpal Abdullah (PH–PKR)
N21	Sungai Acheh	26,095	Rashidi Zinol (BN–UMNO)	9,556	50.33%	124	Zulkifli Ibrahim (PN–BERSATU)	9,432	49.67%	18,988	VAC
N22	Tanjong Bunga	29,477	Zairil Khir Johari (PH–DAP)	13,257	72.82%	8,827	Hng Chee Wey (PN–GERAKAN)	4,430	24.33%	18,205	Zairil Khir Johari (PH–DAP)
N22	Tanjong Bunga	29,477	Zairil Khir Johari (PH–DAP)	13,257	72.82%	8,827	Lee Chui Wah (PRM)	518	2.85%	18,205	Zairil Khir Johari (PH–DAP)
N23	Air Putih	15,371	Lim Guan Eng (PH–DAP)	8,996	85.63%	7,923	Ivan Koh Cheng Ann (PN–GERAKAN)	1,073	10.21%	10,506	Lim Guan Eng (PH–DAP)
N23	Air Putih	15,371	Lim Guan Eng (PH–DAP)	8,996	85.63%	7,923	Teh Yee Cheu (PRM)	437	4.16%	10,506	Lim Guan Eng (PH–DAP)
N24	Kebun Bunga	24,532	Lee Boon Heng (PH–PKR)	14,159	87.83%	12,955	Tan Zhen Zune (PN–GERAKAN)	1,204	7.47%	16,120	Jason Ong Khan Lee (PH–PKR)
N24	Kebun Bunga	24,532	Lee Boon Heng (PH–PKR)	14,159	87.83%	12,955	Razalif Mohamad Zain (IND)	757	4.70%	16,120	Jason Ong Khan Lee (PH–PKR)
N25	Pulau Tikus	23,257	Joshua Woo Sze Zeng (PH–DAP)	11,577	85.09%	9,769	Dave Tang Ching Sern (PN–GERAKAN)	1,808	13.29%	13,605	Chris Lee Chun Kit (PH–DAP)
N25	Pulau Tikus	23,257	Joshua Woo Sze Zeng (PH–DAP)	11,577	85.09%	9,769	Goh Chuin Loon (PRM)	220	1.62%	13,605	Chris Lee Chun Kit (PH–DAP)
N26	Padang Kota	15,165	Chow Kon Yeow (PH–DAP)	8,261	87.83%	7,116	H'ng Khoon Leng (PN–GERAKAN)	1,145	12.17%	9,406	Chow Kon Yeow (PH–DAP)
N27	Pengkalan Kota	21,568	Wong Yuee Harng (PH–DAP)	14,921	94.64%	14,076	Suthakaran Subramaniam (PN–GERAKAN)	845	5.36%	15,766	Gooi Zi Sen (PH–DAP)
N28	Komtar	15,532	Teh Lai Heng (PH–DAP)	9,279	86.61%	7,844	Cheah Kim Huat (PN–BERSATU)	1,435	13.39%	10,714	Teh Lai Heng (PH–DAP)
N29	Datok Keramat	26,791	Jagdeep Singh Deo (PH–DAP)	13,398	72.61%	8,344	Heng See Lin (PN–GERAKAN)	5,054	27.39%	18,452	Jagdeep Singh Deo (PH–DAP)
N30	Sungai Pinang	34,416	Lim Siew Khim (PH–DAP)	16,026	65.13%	8,288	Ng Fook On (PN–GERAKAN)	7,738	31.45%	24,608	Lim Siew Khim (PH–DAP)
N30	Sungai Pinang	34,416	Lim Siew Khim (PH–DAP)	16,026	65.13%	8,288	Abdul Ghani Haroon (PRM)	623	2.53%	24,608	Lim Siew Khim (PH–DAP)
N30	Sungai Pinang	34,416	Lim Siew Khim (PH–DAP)	16,026	65.13%	8,288	Andrew Rajah Bellimin Rajah (IND)	221	0.90%	24,608	Lim Siew Khim (PH–DAP)
N31	Batu Lancang	33,106	Ong Ah Teong (PH–DAP)	21,796	92.12%	19,931	Mohd Aswaad Jaafar (PN–GERAKAN)	1,865	7.88%	23,661	Ong Ah Teong (PH–DAP)
N32	Seri Delima	31,574	Connie Tan Hooi Peng (PH–DAP)	16,384	80.57%	12,434	Mohan Apparoo (PN–BERSATU)	3,950	19.43%	20,334	Syerleena Abdul Rashid (PH–DAP)
N33	Air Itam	23,085	Joseph Ng Soon Seong (PH–DAP)	12,456	79.22%	9,189	Cheang Chee Gooi (PN–GERAKAN)	3,267	20.78%	15,723	Joseph Ng Soon Seong (PH–DAP)
N34	Paya Terubong	62,734	Wong Hon Wai (PH–DAP)	40,530	91.58%	36,802	Andrew Ooi Ghee Oon (PN–GERAKAN)	3,728	8.42%	44,258	Yeoh Soon Hin (PH–DAP)
N35	Batu Uban	43,529	Kumaresan Aramugam (PH–PKR)	22,773	76.83%	16,708	Mok Kok On (PN–GERAKAN)	6,065	20.46%	29,641	Kumaresan Aramugam (PH–PKR)
N35	Batu Uban	43,529	Kumaresan Aramugam (PH–PKR)	22,773	76.83%	16,708	Lee Kim Noor (MUDA)	803	2.71%	29,641	Kumaresan Aramugam (PH–PKR)
N36	Pantai Jerejak	29,890	Fahmi Zainol (PH–PKR)	14,116	69.93%	8,597	Oh Tong Keong (PN–GERAKAN)	5,519	27.34%	20,187	Saifuddin Nasution Ismail (PH–PKR)
N36	Pantai Jerejak	29,890	Fahmi Zainol (PH–PKR)	14,116	69.93%	8,597	Priyankaa Loh Siang Pin (MUDA)	476	2.36%	20,187	Saifuddin Nasution Ismail (PH–PKR)
N36	Pantai Jerejak	29,890	Fahmi Zainol (PH–PKR)	14,116	69.93%	8,597	Ravinder Singh (PRM)	76	0.38%	20,187	Saifuddin Nasution Ismail (PH–PKR)
N37	Batu Maung	47,226	Mohamad Abdul Hamid (PH–PKR)	18,939	54.65%	3,221	Azahari Aris (PN–BERSATU)	15,718	45.35%	34,657	Abdul Halim Hussain (PH–PKR)
N38	Bayan Lepas	39,754	Azrul Mahathir Aziz (PH–AMANAH)	15,462	53.25%	1,889	Dominic Lau Hoe Chai (PN–GERAKAN)	13,573	46.75%	29,035	Azrul Mahathir Aziz (PH–AMANAH)
N39	Pulau Betong	23,838	Mohamad Shukor Zakariah (PN–PAS)	9,534	52.92%	1,051	Mohd. Tuah Ismail (PH–PKR)	8,483	47.08%	18,017	Mohd. Tuah Ismail (PH–PKR)
N40	Telok Bahang	17,927	Muhamad Kasim (PN–BERSATU)	7,245	53.48%	944	Ahmad Zaki Shah Shah Headan (BN–UMNO)	6,301	46.52%	13,546	VAC

== Selangor ==
#	Constituency	Registered Electors	Winner	Votes	Votes %	Majority	Opponent(s)	Votes	Votes %	Total valid votes	Incumbent
PH 32 | PN 22 | BN 2 | MUDA 0 | PSM 0 | PRM 0 | PUR 0 | Independent 0
N01	Sungai Air Tawar	20,026	Rizam Ismail (BN–UMNO)	7,870	52.84%	846	Mohamad Zaidi Selamat (PN–BERSATU)	7,024	47.16%	14,894	Rizam Ismail (BN–UMNO)
N02	Sabak	31,816	Sallehen Mukhyi (PN–PAS)	13,431	59.31%	4,215	Samad Hashim (PH–AMANAH)	9,216	40.69%	22,647	Ahmad Mustain Othman (PH–PKR)
N03	Sungai Panjang	40,786	Mohamad Razali Saari (PN–PAS)	16,977	55.89%	3,576	Mohd Imran Tamrin (BN–UMNO)	13,401	44.11%	30,378	Mohd Imran Tamrin (BN–UMNO)
N04	Sekinchan	23,936	Ng Suee Lim (PH–DAP)	10,232	62.22%	4,018	Goh Gaik Meng (PN–BERSATU)	6,214	37.78%	16,446	Ng Suee Lim (PH–DAP)
N05	Hulu Bernam	30,367	Mu'izuddin Mahyuddin (PN–PAS)	10,718	51.61%	669	Mohd Amran Mohd Shakir (PH–AMANAH)	10,049	48.39%	20,767	Rosni Sohar (BN–UMNO)
N06	Kuala Kubu Baharu	40,015	Lee Kee Hiong (PH–DAP)	14,862	54.40%	4,119	Henry Teoh Kien Hong (PN–GERAKAN)	10,743	39.33%	27,318	Lee Kee Hiong (PH–DAP)
N06	Kuala Kubu Baharu	40,015	Lee Kee Hiong (PH–DAP)	14,862	54.40%	4,119	Sivaprakash Ramasamy (MUDA)	1,186	4.34%	27,318	Lee Kee Hiong (PH–DAP)
N06	Kuala Kubu Baharu	40,015	Lee Kee Hiong (PH–DAP)	14,862	54.40%	4,119	Chng Boon Lai (PRM)	527	1.93%	27,318	Lee Kee Hiong (PH–DAP)
N07	Batang Kali	86,282	Muhammad Muhaimin Harith Abdullah Sani (PN–BERSATU)	32,285	52.42%	2,978	Mohd Isa Abu Kasim (BN–UMNO)	29,307	47.58%	61,592	VAC
N08	Sungai Burong	31,715	Mohammad Zamri Mohamad Zainuddin (PN–PAS)	15,477	64.22%	6,842	Mohamad Khir Ramli (BN–UMNO)	8,605	35.78%	24,052	Mohd Shamsuddin Lias (BN–UMNO)
N09	Permatang	30,796	Nurul Syazwani Noh (PN–BERSATU)	12,850	53.60%	1,728	Mohd. Yahya Mat Shari (PH–PKR)	11,122	46.40%	23,972	Rozana Zainal Abidin (PH–PKR)
N10	Bukit Melawati	37,956	Noorazley Yahya (PN–BERSATU)	14,672	51.54%	877	Thiban Subramaniam (PH–PKR)	13,795	48.46%	28,467	Juwairiya Zulkifli (PH–PKR)
N11	Ijok	30,662	Jefri Mejan (PN–PAS)	12,183	51.52%	912	Amidi Abdul Manan (PH–PKR)	11,271	47.66%	23,648	Idris Ahmad (PH–PKR)
N11	Ijok	30,662	Jefri Mejan (PN–PAS)	12,183	51.52%	912	Tan Cat Keong (IND)	194	0.82%	23,648	Idris Ahmad (PH–PKR)
N12	Jeram	36,707	Harrison Hassan (PN–BERSATU)	16,731	59.62%	5,398	Jahaya Ibrahim (BN–UMNO)	11,333	40.38%	28,064	Mohd Shaid Rosli (PEJUANG)
N13	Kuang	45,606	Mohd Rafiq Mohd Abdulah (PN–BERSATU)	18,494	55.37%	4,875	Hasnal Rezua Merican Habib Merican (BN–UMNO)	13,619	40.78%	33,400	Sallehudin Amiruddin (PEJUANG)
N13	Kuang	45,606	Mohd Rafiq Mohd Abdulah (PN–BERSATU)	18,494	55.37%	4,875	Sallehudin Amiruddin (IND)	1,287	3.85%	33,400	Sallehudin Amiruddin (PEJUANG)
N14	Rawang	76,841	Chua Wei Kiat (PH–PKR)	39,168	74.35%	25,658	Rejean Kumar Ratnam (PN–BERSATU)	13,510	25.65%	52,678	Chua Wei Kiat (PH–PKR)
N15	Taman Templer	62,978	Anfal Saari (PH–AMANAH)	22,247	49.67%	467	Zaidy Abdul Talib (PN–PAS)	21,780	48.62%	44,792	Mohd Sany Hamzan (PH–AMANAH)
N15	Taman Templer	62,978	Anfal Saari (PH–AMANAH)	22,247	49.67%	467	Aida Nazeera Abd Rahman (MUDA)	765	1.71%	44,792	Mohd Sany Hamzan (PH–AMANAH)
N16	Sungai Tua	49,055	Amirudin Shari (PH–PKR)	19,678	56.87%	5,185	Muhammad Hanif Jamaludin (PN–PAS)	14,493	41.89%	34,601	Amirudin Shari (PH–PKR)
N16	Sungai Tua	49,055	Amirudin Shari (PH–PKR)	19,678	56.87%	5,185	Suman Gopal (IND)	430	1.24%	34,601	Amirudin Shari (PH–PKR)
N17	Gombak Setia	88,480	Hilman Idham (PN–BERSATU)	30,299	49.17%	58	Megat Zulkarnain Omardin (BN–UMNO)	30,241	49.08%	61,616	Hilman Idham (PN–BERSATU)
N17	Gombak Setia	88,480	Hilman Idham (PN–BERSATU)	30,299	49.17%	58	Mohd Salim Mohd Ali (IND)	1,076	1.75%	61,616	Hilman Idham (PN–BERSATU)
N18	Hulu Kelang	71,702	Mohamed Azmin Ali (PN–BERSATU)	25,597	51.63%	1,617	Juwairiya Zulkifli (PH–PKR)	23.980	48.37%	49,577	Saari Sungib (PH–AMANAH)
N19	Bukit Antarabangsa	69,501	Kamri Kamaruddin (PH–PKR)	30,772	65.86%	16,280	Sasha Lyna Abdul Latif (PN–BERSATU)	14,492	31.01%	46,726	Mohamed Azmin Ali (PN–BERSATU)
N19	Bukit Antarabangsa	69,501	Kamri Kamaruddin (PH–PKR)	30,772	65.86%	16,280	Melanie Ting Yi-Hlin (MUDA)	1,462	3.13%	46,726	Mohamed Azmin Ali (PN–BERSATU)
N20	Lembah Jaya	65,650	Syed Ahmad Syed Abdul Rahman Alhadad (PH–PKR)	26,298	57.27%	6,678	Sharifah Haslizah Syed Ariffin (PN–PAS)	19,620	42.73%	45,924	Haniza Mohamed Talha (PBM)
N21	Pandan Indah	70,776	Izham Hashim (PH–AMANAH)	27,878	59.95%	10,591	Fazil Mohamad Dali (PN–BERSATU)	17,287	37.17%	46,502	Izham Hashim (PH–AMANAH)
N21	Pandan Indah	70,776	Izham Hashim (PH–AMANAH)	27,878	59.95%	10,591	Noor Faralisa Redzuan (MUDA)	1,166	2.51%	46,502	Izham Hashim (PH–AMANAH)
N21	Pandan Indah	70,776	Izham Hashim (PH–AMANAH)	27,878	59.95%	10,591	Sivaneswaran Ramasundram (IND)	171	0.37%	46,502	Izham Hashim (PH–AMANAH)
N22	Teratai	76,579	Yew Jia Haur (PH–DAP)	42,519	80.07%	31,933	Chew Han Keai (PN–BERSATU)	10,586	19.93%	53,105	Lai Wai Chong (WARISAN)
N23	Dusun Tua	74,419	Johan Abd Aziz (BN–UMNO)	26,755	49.91%	3,014	Azhar Hambali (PN–BERSATU)	23,741	44.29%	53,606	Edry Faizal Eddy Yusof (PH–DAP)
N23	Dusun Tua	74,419	Johan Abd Aziz (BN–UMNO)	26,755	49.91%	3,014	Al Hafiz Ikhwan (MUDA)	3,110	5.80%	53,606	Edry Faizal Eddy Yusof (PH–DAP)
N24	Semenyih	97,300	Nushi Mahfodz (PN–PAS)	37,068	50.87%	1,262	Wan Zulaika Anua (BN–UMNO)	35,806	49.13%	72,874	Zakaria Hanafi (BN–UMNO)
N25	Kajang	109,785	David Cheong Kian Young (PH–PKR)	54,794	70.36%	34,394	Allan Liew Sin Kim (PN–BERSATU)	20,400	26.20%	77,875	Hee Loy Sian (PH–PKR)
N25	Kajang	109,785	David Cheong Kian Young (PH–PKR)	54,794	70.36%	34,394	Arutchelvan Subramaniam (PSM)	2,681	3.44%	77,875	Hee Loy Sian (PH–PKR)
N26	Sungai Ramal	97,415	Mohd Shafie Ngah (PN–PAS)	40,259	55.34%	7,767	Mazwan Johar (PH–AMANAH)	32,492	44.66%	72,751	Mazwan Johar (PH–AMANAH)
N27	Balakong	104,269	Wayne Ong Chun Wei (PH–DAP)	54,983	76.21%	37,820	Steven Lai Choon Wen (PN–BERSATU)	17,163	23.79%	72,146	Wong Siew Ki (PH–DAP)
N28	Seri Kembangan	62,822	Wong Siew Ki (PH–DAP)	39,684	89.30%	36,160	Ken Liau Wei Jian (PN–BERSATU)	3,524	7.93%	44,437	Ean Yong Hian Wah (PH–DAP)
N28	Seri Kembangan	62,822	Wong Siew Ki (PH–DAP)	39,684	89.30%	36,160	Wong Jung Lik (IND)	1,229	2.77%	44,437	Ean Yong Hian Wah (PH–DAP)
N29	Seri Serdang	93,235	Abbas Salimi Azmi (PH–AMANAH)	37,411	56.77%	10,752	Mohd Shukor Mustaffa (PN–BERSATU)	26,659	40.45%	65,904	Siti Mariah Mahmud (PH–AMANAH)
N29	Seri Serdang	93,235	Abbas Salimi Azmi (PH–AMANAH)	37,411	56.77%	10,752	Amir Hariri Abdul Hadi (MUDA)	1,834	2.78%	65,904	Siti Mariah Mahmud (PH–AMANAH)
N30	Kinrara	123,782	Ng Sze Han (PH–DAP)	71,290	80.97%	54,535	Wong Yong Kang (PN–BERSATU)	16,755	19.03%	88,045	Ng Sze Han (PH–DAP)
N31	Subang Jaya	111,970	Michelle Ng Mei Sze (PH–DAP)	60,364	81.26%	51,191	Gana Pragasam Sebastian (PN–BERSATU)	9,173	12.35%	74,286	Michelle Ng Mei Sze (PH–DAP)
N31	Subang Jaya	111,970	Michelle Ng Mei Sze (PH–DAP)	60,364	81.26%	51,191	Zayd Shaukat (MUDA)	4,749	6.39%	74,286	Michelle Ng Mei Sze (PH–DAP)
N32	Seri Setia	80,371	Fahmi Ngah (PH–PKR)	32,367	58.37%	11,331	Muhd Zubir Embong (PN–PAS)	21,036	37.93%	55,453	Halimey Abu Bakar (PH–PKR)
N32	Seri Setia	80,371	Fahmi Ngah (PH–PKR)	32,367	58.37%	11,331	Dobby Chew (MUDA)	1,357	2.45%	55,453	Halimey Abu Bakar (PH–PKR)
N32	Seri Setia	80,371	Fahmi Ngah (PH–PKR)	32,367	58.37%	11,331	Harindran Krishnan (IND)	693	1.25%	55,453	Halimey Abu Bakar (PH–PKR)
N33	Taman Medan	61,959	Afif Bahardin (PN–BERSATU)	22,316	50.03%	30	Ahmad Akhir Pawan Chik (PH–PKR)	22,286	49.97%	44,602	Syamsul Firdaus Mohamed Supri (PH–PKR)
N34	Bukit Gasing	54,238	Rajiv Rishyakaran (PH–DAP)	28,227	85.87%	24,972	Nallan Dhanabalan (PN–GERAKAN)	3,255	9.90%	32,872	Rajiv Rishyakaran (PH–DAP)
N34	Bukit Gasing	54,238	Rajiv Rishyakaran (PH–DAP)	28,227	85.87%	24,972	Kalyana Rajasekaran Teagarajan (MUDA)	1,390	4.23%	32,872	Rajiv Rishyakaran (PH–DAP)
N35	Kampung Tunku	58,357	Lim Yi Wei (PH–DAP)	33,640	90.90%	30,273	Ruby Chin Yoke Kheng (PN–BERSATU)	3,367	9.10%	37,007	Lim Yi Wei (PH–DAP)
N36	Bandar Utama	73,038	Jamaliah Jamaluddin (PH–DAP)	39,845	85.25%	35,446	Nur Alif Mohd Tafid (PN–GERAKAN)	4,399	9.41%	46,740	Jamaliah Jamaluddin (PH–DAP)
N36	Bandar Utama	73,038	Jamaliah Jamaluddin (PH–DAP)	39,845	85.25%	35,446	Abe Lim Hooi Sean (MUDA)	2,496	5.34%	46,740	Jamaliah Jamaluddin (PH–DAP)
N37	Bukit Lanjan	110,583	Pua Pei Ling (PH–PKR)	57,051	78.29%	41,227	Muniraa Abu Bakar (PN–GERAKAN)	15,824	21.71%	72,875	Elizabeth Wong Keat Ping (PH–PKR)
N38	Paya Jaras	72,563	Abdul Halim Tamuri (PN–PAS)	27,527	51.63%	1,986	Mohd Khairuddin Othman (PH–PKR)	25,541	47.91%	53,313	Mohd Khairuddin Othman (PH–PKR)
N38	Paya Jaras	72,563	Abdul Halim Tamuri (PN–PAS)	27,527	51.63%	1,986	Nurhaslinda Basri (IND)	245	0.46%	53,313	Mohd Khairuddin Othman (PH–PKR)
N39	Kota Damansara	90,130	Muhammad Izuan Kasim (PH–PKR)	34,628	53.72%	5,694	Mohd Radzlan Jalaludin (PN–BERSATU)	28,934	44.89%	64,457	Shatiri Mansor (PH–PKR)
N39	Kota Damansara	90,130	Muhammad Izuan Kasim (PH–PKR)	34,628	53.72%	5,694	Sivarajan Arumugam (PSM)	895	1.39%	64,457	Shatiri Mansor (PH–PKR)
N40	Kota Anggerik	95,104	Najwan Halimi (PH–PKR)	38,470	55.97%	10,834	Mohamed Sukri Omar (PN–PAS)	27,636	40.21%	68,737	Najwan Halimi (PH–PKR)
N40	Kota Anggerik	95,104	Najwan Halimi (PH–PKR)	38,470	55.97%	10,834	Azad Akbar Khan (MUDA)	2,631	3.83%	68,737	Najwan Halimi (PH–PKR)
N41	Batu Tiga	75,486	Danial Al-Rashid Haron Aminar Rashid (PH–AMANAH)	29,064	51.30%	3,382	Rina Mohd Harun (PN–BERSATU)	25,682	45.33%	56,654	Rodziah Ismail (PH–PKR)
N41	Batu Tiga	75,486	Danial Al-Rashid Haron Aminar Rashid (PH–AMANAH)	29,064	51.30%	3,382	Syaidiyah Izzati Nur Razak Maideen (MUDA)	1,908	3.37%	56,654	Rodziah Ismail (PH–PKR)
N42	Meru	65,801	Mariam Abdul Rashid (PH–AMANAH)	26,980	52.45%	3,422	Hasnizam Adham (PN–BERSATU)	23,558	45.80%	51,437	Mohd Fakhrulrazi Mohd Mokhtar (PH–PKR)
N42	Meru	65,801	Mariam Abdul Rashid (PH–AMANAH)	26,980	52.45%	3,422	Sivaranjani Manickam (PSM)	899	1.75%	51,437	Mohd Fakhrulrazi Mohd Mokhtar (PH–PKR)
N43	Sementa	68,969	Noor Najhan Mohamad Salleh (PN–PAS)	32,300	59.20%	10,039	Erni Afrishah Azizi (PH–PKR)	22,261	40.80%	54,561	Daroyah Alwi (PBM)
N44	Selat Klang	57,613	Abdul Rashid Asari (PN–BERSATU)	25,143	58.88%	8,325	Roslee Abd Hamid (BN–UMNO)	16,818	39.38%	42,703	Abdul Rashid Asari (PN–BERSATU)
N44	Selat Klang	57,613	Abdul Rashid Asari (PN–BERSATU)	25,143	58.88%	8,325	Mohamad Ezam Mohd Nor (PRM)	742	1.74%	42,703	Abdul Rashid Asari (PN–BERSATU)
N45	Bandar Baru Klang	82,826	Quah Perng Fei (PH–DAP)	53,658	87.04%	45,672	Tan Seng Huat (PN–GERAKAN)	7,986	12.96%	61,644	Teng Chang Khim (PH–DAP)
N46	Pelabuhan Klang	51,907	Azmizam Zaman Huri (PH–PKR)	21,886	56.39%	5,228	Wan Hasrina Wan Hassan (PN–PAS)	16,658	42.92%	38,813	Azmizam Zaman Huri (PH–PKR)
N46	Pelabuhan Klang	51,907	Azmizam Zaman Huri (PH–PKR)	21,886	56.39%	5,228	Syed Ahmad Putra Syed Isa (PRM)	269	0.69%	38,813	Azmizam Zaman Huri (PH–PKR)
N47	Pandamaran	75,777	Tony Leong Tuck Chee (PH–DAP)	46,999	86.75%	40,298	Gunalan Balakrishnan (PN–BERSATU)	6,701	12.37%	54,179	Tony Leong Tuck Chee (PH–DAP)
N47	Pandamaran	75,777	Tony Leong Tuck Chee (PH–DAP)	46,999	86.75%	40,298	Tan Kang Yap (PRM)	479	0.88%	54,179	Tony Leong Tuck Chee (PH–DAP)
N48	Sentosa	90,270	Gunarajah George (PH–PKR)	54,601	83.53%	46,349	Parameswaran Ganason (PN–GERAKAN)	8,252	12.62%	65,366	Gunarajah George (PH–PKR)
N48	Sentosa	90,270	Gunarajah George (PH–PKR)	54,601	83.53%	46,349	Thanusha Ramanieswaran (MUDA)	2,357	3.61%	65,366	Gunarajah George (PH–PKR)
N48	Sentosa	90,270	Gunarajah George (PH–PKR)	54,601	83.53%	46,349	Jeichandran Wadivelu (PRM)	156	0.24%	65,366	Gunarajah George (PH–PKR)
N49	Sungai Kandis	78,605	Wan Dzahanurin Ahmad (PN–BERSATU)	28,926	49.01%	167	Zawawi Mughni (PH–PKR)	28,759	48.72%	59,026	Zawawi Mughni (PH–PKR)
N49	Sungai Kandis	78,605	Wan Dzahanurin Ahmad (PN–BERSATU)	28,926	49.01%	167	Arfiena Shaqira Sariff (MUDA)	1,341	2.27%	59,026	Zawawi Mughni (PH–PKR)
N50	Kota Kemuning	81,946	Preakas Sampunathan (PH–DAP)	41,254	70.08%	24,288	Jimmy Chew Jyh Gang (PN–GERAKAN)	16,966	28.82%	58,871	Ganabatirau Veraman (PH–DAP)
N50	Kota Kemuning	81,946	Preakas Sampunathan (PH–DAP)	41,254	70.08%	24,288	Gunasekaran Kuppan (PRM)	651	1.11%	58,871	Ganabatirau Veraman (PH–DAP)
N51	Sijangkang	62,907	Ahmad Yunus Hairi (PN–PAS)	30,422	61.41%	11,308	Mohd Al-Hafizi Abu Bakar (BN–UMNO)	19,114	38.59%	49,356	Ahmad Yunus Hairi (PN–PAS)
N52	Banting	44,972	Papparaidu Veraman (PH–DAP)	27,223	80.58%	22,102	Saravanan Mutto Krishnan (PN–GERAKAN)	5,121	15.16%	33,783	Lau Weng San (PH–DAP)
N52	Banting	44,972	Papparaidu Veraman (PH–DAP)	27,223	80.58%	22,102	Ang Wei Yang (IND)	1,439	4.26%	33,783	Lau Weng San (PH–DAP)
N53	Morib	43,828	Roznizan Ahmad (PN–BERSATU)	18,936	55.65%	3,843	Hasnul Baharuddin (PH–AMANAH)	15,093	44.35%	34,029	Hasnul Baharuddin (PH–AMANAH)
N54	Tanjong Sepat	32,312	Borhan Aman Shah (PH–PKR)	13,860	55.01%	2,524	Sabirin Marsono (PN–PAS)	11,336	44.99%	25,226	Borhan Aman Shah (PH–PKR)
N55	Dengkil	93,931	Jamil Salleh (PN–BERSATU)	33,561	48.52%	407	Noorazli Said (BN–UMNO)	33,154	47.93%	69,165	Adhif Syan Abdullah (PN–BERSATU)
N55	Dengkil	93,931	Jamil Salleh (PN–BERSATU)	33,561	48.52%	407	Darren Ong Chung Lee (PSM)	1,782	2.58%	69,165	Adhif Syan Abdullah (PN–BERSATU)
N55	Dengkil	93,931	Jamil Salleh (PN–BERSATU)	33,561	48.52%	407	Mohd Daud Leong Abdullah (PUR)	668	0.97%	69,165	Adhif Syan Abdullah (PN–BERSATU)
N56	Sungai Pelek	47,335	Lwi Kian Keong (PH–DAP)	17,984	51.77%	1,458	Suhaimi Mohd Ghazali (PN–BERSATU)	16,526	47.57%	34,740	Ronnie Liu Tian Khiew (PH–DAP)
N56	Sungai Pelek	47,335	Lwi Kian Keong (PH–DAP)	17,984	51.77%	1,458	Nageswaran Ravi (IND)	230	0.66%	34,740	Ronnie Liu Tian Khiew (PH–DAP)

== Negeri Sembilan ==
#	Constituency	Registered Electors	Winner	Votes	Votes %	Majority	Opponent(s)	Votes	Votes %	Total valid votes	Incumbent
PH 17 | BN 14 | PN 5 | MUDA 0 | Independent 0
N01	Chennah	14,554	Anthony Loke Siew Fook (PH–DAP)	5,888	61.49%	2,200	Rosmadi Arif (PN–BERSATU)	3,688	38.51%	9,576	Anthony Loke Siew Fook (PH–DAP)
N02	Pertang	12,897	Jalaluddin Alias (BN–UMNO)	5,634	66.45%	2,790	Amiruddin Hassan (PN–PAS)	2,844	33.55%	8,478	Noor Azmi Yusuf (BN–UMNO)
N03	Sungai Lui	20,206	Mohd Razi Mohd Ali (BN–UMNO)	6,939	52.00%	535	Mohammad Nordin Hashim (PN–PAS)	6,404	48.00%	13,343	Mohd Razi Mohd Ali (BN–UMNO)
N04	Klawang	13,163	Bakri Sawir (PH–AMANAH)	4,598	51.19%	577	Danni Rais (PN–BERSATU)	4,021	44.76%	8,983	Bakri Sawir (PH–AMANAH)
N04	Klawang	13,163	Bakri Sawir (PH–AMANAH)	4,598	51.19%	577	Saiful Bahri Jaaman (IND)	364	4.05%	8,983	Bakri Sawir (PH–AMANAH)
N05	Serting	30,287	Mohammad Fairuz Mohammad Isa (PN–PAS)	10,312	52.13%	843	Muhamad Zamri Omar (BN–UMNO)	9,469	47.87%	19,781	Shamshulkahar Mohd Deli (BN–UMNO)
N06	Palong	23,494	Mustapha Nagoor (BN–UMNO)	7,940	51.84%	564	Noor Azman Parmin (PN–BERSATU)	7,376	48.16%	15,316	Mustapha Nagoor (BN–UMNO)
N07	Jeram Padang	16,332	Mohd Zaidy Abdul Kadir (BN–UMNO)	5,462	53.39%	693	Surash Sreenivasan (PN–BERSATU)	4,769	46.61%	10,231	Manickam Letchuman (BN–MIC)
N08	Bahau	25,769	Teo Kok Seong (PH–DAP)	11,939	77.18%	8,408	Kumar S Paramasivam (PN–PAS)	3,531	22.82%	15,470	Teo Kok Seong (PH–DAP)
N09	Lenggeng	27,386	Mohd Asna Amin (BN–UMNO)	10,040	50.71%	685	Mohammad Fadhli Che Me (PN–PAS)	9,355	47.25%	19,799	Suhaimi Kassim (PH–AMANAH)
N09	Lenggeng	27,386	Mohd Asna Amin (BN–UMNO)	10,040	50.71%	685	Zul Azki Mat Sulop (IND)	404	2.04%	19,799	Suhaimi Kassim (PH–AMANAH)
N10	Nilai	42,168	Arul Kumar Jambunathan (PH–DAP)	19,133	66.29%	10,889	Gan Chee Biow (PN–BERSATU)	8,244	28.56%	28,864	Arul Kumar Jambunathan (PH–DAP)
N10	Nilai	42,168	Arul Kumar Jambunathan (PH–DAP)	19,133	66.29%	10,889	Omar Mohd Isa (IND)	1,430	4.95%	28,864	Arul Kumar Jambunathan (PH–DAP)
N10	Nilai	42,168	Arul Kumar Jambunathan (PH–DAP)	19,133	66.29%	10,889	Yessu Samuel (IND)	57	0.20%	28,864	Arul Kumar Jambunathan (PH–DAP)
N11	Lobak	23,193	Chew Seh Yong (PH–DAP)	14,357	94.39%	13,504	Ng Soon Lean (PN–GERAKAN)	853	5.61%	15,210	Chew Seh Yong (PH–DAP)
N12	Temiang	13,085	Ng Chin Tsai (PH–DAP)	5,710	63.50%	3,068	Chua Eng Pu (PN–GERAKAN)	2,642	29.38%	8,992	Ng Chin Tsai (PH–DAP)
N12	Temiang	13,085	Ng Chin Tsai (PH–DAP)	5,710	63.50%	3,068	Ahmad Qusyairi Abdul Rahim (MUDA)	640	7.12%	8,992	Ng Chin Tsai (PH–DAP)
N13	Sikamat	32,343	Aminuddin Harun (PH–PKR)	12,730	54.82%	2,662	Ahmad Raihan Muhamad Hilal (PN–BERSATU)	10,068	43.36%	23,220	Aminuddin Harun (PH–PKR)
N13	Sikamat	32,343	Aminuddin Harun (PH–PKR)	12,730	54.82%	2,662	Mohammed Hafiz Baharudin (IND)	339	1.46%	23,220	Aminuddin Harun (PH–PKR)
N13	Sikamat	32,343	Aminuddin Harun (PH–PKR)	12,730	54.82%	2,662	Bujang Abu (IND)	83	0.36%	23,220	Aminuddin Harun (PH–PKR)
N14	Ampangan	20,992	Tengku Zamrah Tengku Sulaiman (PH–PKR)	6,054	40.75%	329	Muhammad Ghazali Zainal Abidin (PN–BERSATU)	5,725	38.53%	14,858	Mohamad Rafie Abdul Malek (PH–PKR)
N14	Ampangan	20,992	Tengku Zamrah Tengku Sulaiman (PH–PKR)	6,054	40.75%	329	Mohamad Rafie Abdul Malek (IND)	3,079	20.72%	14,858	Mohamad Rafie Abdul Malek (PH–PKR)
N15	Juasseh	13,408	Bibi Sharliza Mohd Khalid (BN–UMNO)	4,549	50.43%	78	Eddin Syazlee Shith (PN–BERSATU)	4,471	49.57%	9,020	Ismail Lasim (BN–UMNO)
N16	Seri Menanti	10,045	Muhammad Sufian Maradzi (BN–UMNO)	3,711	52.62%	370	Jamali Salam (PN–BERSATU)	3,341	47.38%	7,052	Abdul Samad Ibrahim (BN–UMNO)
N17	Senaling	9,886	Ismail Lasim (BN–UMNO)	3,724	54.88%	662	Amrina Mohammad Khalid (PN–BERSATU)	3,062	45.12%	6,786	Adnan Abu Hassan (BN–UMNO)
N18	Pilah	17,692	Noorzunita Begum Abdullah (PH–PKR)	6,222	54.75%	1,079	Rafiei Mustapha (PN–PAS)	5,143	45.25%	11,365	Mohamad Nazaruddin Sabtu (PH–PKR)
N19	Johol	12,313	Saiful Yazan Sulaiman (BN–UMNO)	5,228	62.69%	2,117	Kamaruddin Md Tahir (PN–PAS)	3,111	37.31%	8,339	Saiful Yazan Sulaiman (BN–UMNO)
N20	Labu	30,478	Mohamad Hanifah Abu Bakar (PN–BERSATU)	11,661	53.78%	1,640	Ismail Ahmad (PH–PKR)	10,021	46.22%	21,682	Ismail Ahmad (PH–PKR)
N21	Bukit Kepayang	46,229	Nicole Tan Lee Koon (PH–DAP)	24,626	80.77%	19,684	Subramaniam Purusothama (PN–BERSATU)	4,942	16.21%	30,489	Nicole Tan Lee Koon (PH–DAP)
N21	Bukit Kepayang	46,229	Nicole Tan Lee Koon (PH–DAP)	24,626	80.77%	19,684	Ahmad Zamali Mohamad (IND)	921	3.02%	30,489	Nicole Tan Lee Koon (PH–DAP)
N22	Rahang	20,182	Siau Meow Kong (PH–DAP)	9,868	74.17%	6,432	Lee Boon Shian (PN–GERAKAN)	3,436	25.83%	13,304	Mary Josephine Pritam Singh (PH–DAP)
N23	Mambau	28,952	Yap Yew Weng (PH–DAP)	17,039	88.28%	14,940	Sathes Kumar Nillamiam (PN–PAS)	2,099	10.88%	19,301	Yap Yew Weng (PH–DAP)
N23	Mambau	28,952	Yap Yew Weng (PH–DAP)	17,039	88.28%	14,940	Kumaravel Ramiah (IND)	163	0.84%	19,301	Yap Yew Weng (PH–DAP)
N24	Seremban Jaya	32,290	Gunasekaren Palasamy (PH–DAP)	17,080	79.60%	12,703	Gary Lee Ban Fatt (PN–GERAKAN)	4,377	20.40%	21,457	Gunasekaren Palasamy (PH–DAP)
N25	Paroi	60,704	Kamarol Ridzwan Mohammad Zin (PN–PAS)	23,840	55.33%	5,539	Norwani Ahmat (PH–AMANAH)	18,301	42.48%	43,085	Mohamad Taufek Abd. Ghani (PH–AMANAH)
N25	Paroi	60,704	Kamarol Ridzwan Mohammad Zin (PN–PAS)	23,840	55.33%	5,539	Muhammad Syakir Fitri Sadri (IND)	944	2.19%	43,085	Mohamad Taufek Abd. Ghani (PH–AMANAH)
N26	Chembong	25,625	Zaifulbahri Idris (BN–UMNO)	11,261	61.92%	4,335	Bakly Baba (PN–BERSATU)	6,926	38.08%	18,187	Zaifulbahri Idris (BN–UMNO)
N27	Rantau	32,890	Mohamad Hasan (BN–UMNO)	16,957	71.75%	10,280	Rozmal Malakan (PN–PAS)	6,677	28.25%	23,634	Mohamad Hasan (BN–UMNO)
N28	Kota	16,510	Suhaimi Aini (BN–UMNO)	5,869	50.58%	135	Ahmad Shukri Abdul Shukur (PN–BERSATU)	5,734	49.42%	11,603	Awaludin Said (BN–UMNO)
N29	Chuah	15,095	Yew Boon Lye (PH–PKR)	8,172	81.35%	6,298	Tang Jay Son (PN–GERAKAN)	1,874	18.65%	10,046	Yek Diew Ching (PH–PKR)
N30	Lukut	26,806	Choo Ken Hwa (PH–DAP)	13,696	79.36%	10,135	Ragoo Subramaniam (PN–PAS)	3,561	20.64%	17,257	Choo Ken Hwa (PH–DAP)
N31	Bagan Pinang	27,790	Abdul Fatah Zakaria (PN–PAS)	10,921	59.30%	3,426	Mohd Najib Mohd Isa (BN–UMNO)	7,495	40.70%	18,416	Tun Hairuddin Abu Bakar (BN–UMNO)
N32	Linggi	20,696	Mohd Faizal Ramli (BN–UMNO)	7,832	55.14%	1,461	Zamri Md Said (PN–BERSATU)	6,371	44.86%	17,203	Abd Rahman Mohd Redza (BN–UMNO)
N33	Sri Tanjung	19,431	Rajasekaran Gunasekaran (PH–PKR)	8,239	66.01%	3,996	Zabidi Ariffin (PN–BERSATU)	4,243	33.99%	12,482	Ravi Munusamy (PH–PKR)
N34	Gemas	29,648	Ridzuan Ahmad (PN–BERSATU)	11,653	57.73%	3,120	Abdul Razak Said (BN–UMNO)	8,533	42.27%	20,186	Abdul Razak Said (BN–UMNO)
N35	Gemencheh	24,602	Suhaimizan Bizar (BN–UMNO)	8,905	57.91%	2,434	Tengku Abdullah Tengku Rakhman (PN–PAS)	6,471	42.09%	15,376	Mohd Isam Mohd Isa (BN–UMNO)
N36	Repah	27,284	Veerapan Superamaniam (PH–DAP)	11,507	67.43%	5,950	Elaine Yong Li Yi (PN–GERAKAN)	5,557	32.57%	17,064	Veerapan Superamaniam (PH–DAP)
