= 2004 Kuala Berang by-election =

Election in Malaysia

← 2004	28 August 2004	2008 →

Kuala Berang seat in the Terengganu State Legislative Assembly
	BN	PAS
Candidate	Mohd Zawawi Ismail	Muhyidin Abdul Rashid
Party	BN (UMNO)	PAS
Popular vote	6,051	3,992
Percentage	60.25%	39.75%
Kuala Berang assemblyman before election
Komaruddin Abdul Rahman
BN (UMNO)
Elected Kuala Berang assemblyman
Mohd Zawawi Ismail
BN (UMNO)

The 2004 Kuala Berang by-election is a by-election for the Terengganu State Legislative Assembly state seat of Kuala Berang, Malaysia that were held on 28 August 2004. It was called following the death of the incumbent, Komaruddin Abdul Rahman on 30 July 2004.

== Background ==
Komaruddin Abdul Rahman, from United Malays National Organization (UMNO), were elected to the Terengganu State Legislative Assembly state seat of Kuala Berang at the 2004 Terengganu state election, winning the seat in his first attempt as a Barisan Nasional (BN) candidate and helped BN regaining the seat from Pan-Malaysian Islamic Party (PAS) candidate. A vice-chief of UMNO Hulu Terengganu division, he was BN's development officer of Kuala Berang seat, when the seat and also the state was under PAS' control.

On 30 July 2004, Komaruddin died at Awana Hospital, Genting Highlands after suffering a heart attack. He was on a holiday trip with his family and several Terengganu assemblymen, before going to Kuantan to participate in a charity football friendly match between Pahang Menteri Besar team and Terengganu State Legislative assembly team. Komaruddin's death means that Kuala Berang state seat were vacated. This necessitates for by-election to be held, as the seat were vacated more that 2 years before the expiry of Terengganu assembly current term. Election Commission of Malaysia (SPR) announced that the by-election for the seat will be held on 28 August 2004, with 16 August 2009 set as the nomination day.

== Nomination and campaign ==
After nomination closed, it was confirmed that BN will face PAS in a straight fight for the Kuala Berang seat. BN nominated Mohd Zawawi Ismail, an Assistant Education Officer of Hulu Terengganu district, and a diploma holder from Raja Melewar Education College. PAS meanwhile nominated Muhyidin Rashid, who lost for Hulu Terengganu parliamentary seat in the 2004 Malaysian general election.

Observers predicted that BN will retain the seat as it has been among the safest BN seats in the state, and only changed hand 2 times (1974 and 1999), both to PAS.

== Timeline ==
The key dates are listed below.

Date	Event
	Issue of the Writ of Election
16 August 2004	Nomination Day
16–27 August 2004	Campaigning Period
	Early polling day for postal and overseas voters
28 August 2004	Polling Day

== Results ==
Terengganu state by-election, 2004: Kuala Berang The by-election was called upon the death of the incumbent, Komarudin Abdul Rahman
Party	Candidate	Votes	%	∆%
BN	Mohd Zawawi Ismail	6,051	60.25	▲1.91
PAS	Muhyidin Abdul Rashid	3,992	39.75	▼1.91
Total valid votes		10,043	100.00	
Total rejected ballots		103		
Unreturned ballots				
Turnout				
Registered electors				
Majority		2,059	20.50	▲3.82
BN hold		Swing		

=== Previous result ===
Terengganu state election, 2004: Kuala Berang
Party	Candidate	Votes	%	∆%
BN	Komarudin Abdul Rahman	5,926	58.34	▲19.74
PAS	Mamad Puteh	4,231	41.66	▼19.74
Total valid votes		10,157	100.00	
Total rejected ballots				
Unreturned ballots				
Turnout				
Registered electors				
Majority		1,695	16.68	▼6.12
BN gain from PAS		Swing	N/A	
