= Ghazali Sulaiman =

Malaysian politician

Yang Berhormat Tuan Ghazali Sulaiman AMT MLA
- غزالي سليمان

Member of the Terengganu State Legislative Assembly for Bukit Besi
- Incumbent
- Assumed office 12 August 2023
- Preceded by: Roslee Daud (BN–UMNO)
- Majority: 3,712 (2023)

Personal details
- Born: 19 June 1964 (age 61) Kampung Batu Enam, Kuala Terengganu, Terengganu, Malaysia
- Party: Malaysian Islamic Party (PAS)
- Occupation: Politician

Ghazali bin Sulaiman is a Malaysian politician who served as Member of the Terengganu State Legislative Assembly (MLA) for Bukit Besi since August 2023. He is a member of Malaysian Islamic Party (PAS), a component party of Perikatan Nasional (PN).

== Election results ==
Terengganu State Legislative Assembly
Year	Constituency	Candidate	Votes	Pct	Opponent(s)	Votes	Pct	Ballots cast	Majority	Turnout
2018	N25 Bukit Besi	Ghazali Sulaiman (PAS)	5,724	47.78%	Roslee Daud (UMNO)	5,770	48.16%	12,239	46	84.40%
2018	N25 Bukit Besi	Ghazali Sulaiman (PAS)	5,724	47.78%	Mohamad Arif Arifin (PPBM)	487	4.06%	12,239	46	84.40%
2023	N25 Bukit Besi	Ghazali Sulaiman (PAS)	8,552	63.86%	Din Adam (UMNO)	4,840	36.14%	13,495	3,712	74.17%

== Honours ==
- Terengganu
  - Member of the Order of the Crown of Terengganu (AMT) (2025)
