= Mohd Nor Othman =

Malaysian politician

Haji Mohd Nor Othman
- محمد نور عثمان

Member of the Malaysian Parliament for Hulu Terengganu
- In office 8 March 2008 – 5 May 2013
- Preceded by: Tengku Putera Tengku Awang
- Succeeded by: Jailani Johari

Personal details
- Born: 14 May 1952 (age 74) Terengganu, Federation of Malaya (now Malaysia)
- Party: UMNO (until 2018); PKR (2018-2020); BERSATU (since 2020)
- Other political affiliations: Barisan Nasional (until 2018); Pakatan Harapan (2018-2020); Perikatan Nasional; Muafakat Nasional
- Occupation: Politician

Haji Mohd Nor Othman (born 14 May 1952) was the Member of the Parliament of Malaysia for the Hulu Terengganu constituency in Terengganu from 2008 to 2013, sitting as a member of the United Malays National Organisation (UMNO) party in the ruling Barisan Nasional coalition.

Mohd Nor was elected to Parliament in the 2008 election, but did not re-contest his seat in the 2013 election. Later, Mohd Nor contested under the PKR ticket in 2018 for the Kuala Berang state seat but only managed to get 969 votes.

== Election results ==
Parliament of Malaysia
| Year | Constituency | Candidate | Votes | Pct | Opponent(s) | Votes | Pct | Ballots cast | Majority | Turnout |
|---|---|---|---|---|---|---|---|---|---|---|
| 2008 | P038 Hulu Terengganu | Mohd Nor Othman (UMNO) | 27,784 | 61.59% | Kamaruzaman Abdullah (PAS) | 17,324 | 38.41% | 45,971 | 10,460 | 87.54% |

Terengganu State Legislative Assembly
| Year | Constituency | Candidate | Votes | Pct | Opponent(s) | Votes | Pct | Ballots cast | Majority | Turnout |
|---|---|---|---|---|---|---|---|---|---|---|
| 2018 | N23 Kuala Berang | Mohd Nor Othman (PKR) | 969 | 6.33% | Mamad Puteh (PAS) | 7,707 | 50.33% | 15,571 | 1,070 | 87.20% |
| 2018 | N23 Kuala Berang | Mohd Nor Othman (PKR) | 969 | 6.33% | Tengku Putera Tengku Awang (UMNO) | 6,637 | 43.34% | 15,571 | 1,070 | 87.20% |
