= Hanafiah Mat =

Malaysian politician

Yang Berhormat Dato' Hanafiah Mat DPMT SMZ MLA
- حنفيه مت

Member of the Terengganu State Executive Council (Welfare, Women and Family Development & National Unity : 10 May 2018 – 15 August 2023 & Infrastructure, Utilities & Rural Development : since 16 August 2023) (Note: Assumed portfolios on 16 August 2023.)
- Incumbent
- Assumed office 15 August 2023
- Monarch: Mizan Zainal Abidin
- Menteri Besar: Ahmad Samsuri Mokhtar
- Deputy: Mohd Zawawi Ismail
- Preceded by: Mamad Puteh (Infrastructure & Utilities); Azman Ibrahim (Rural Development)
- Constituency: Cukai
- In office 10 May 2018 – 15 August 2023
- Monarch: Mizan Zainal Abidin
- Menteri Besar: Ahmad Samsuri Mokhtar
- Deputy: Alias Harun
- Preceded by: Roslee Daud
- Succeeded by: Maliaman Kassim
- Constituency: Cukai

Member of the Terengganu State Legislative Assembly for Cukai
- Incumbent
- Assumed office 5 May 2013
- Preceded by: Mohamad Awang Tera (BN–UMNO)
- Majority: 2,446 (2013); 4,881 (2018); 8,106 (2023)

Personal details
- Born: Hanafiah bin Mat Terengganu, Malaysia
- Citizenship: Malaysian
- Party: Malaysian Islamic Party (PAS)
- Other political affiliations: Pakatan Rakyat (PR) (2008–2015); Gagasan Sejahtera (GS) (2016–2020); Perikatan Nasional (PN) (since 2020)
- Occupation: Politician

Hanafiah bin Mat is a Malaysian politician who has served as Member of the Terengganu State Executive Council (EXCO) in the Gagasan Sejahtera (GS) and Perikatan Nasional (PN) state administration under Menteri Besar Ahmad Samsuri Mokhtar since May 2018 and Member of the Terengganu State Legislative Assembly (MLA) for Cukai since May 2013. He is a member and Division Deputy Chief of Kemaman of the Malaysian Islamic Party (PAS), a component party of the PN and formerly GS as well as Pakatan Rakyat (PR) coalitions. His alleged insult at the 'Menu Rahmah' initiative and call to abandon the targeted diesel subsidy policy were controversial and widely criticised by Malaysians.

== Controversies and issues ==
=== Call to abandon targeted diesel subsidy ===
On 28 May 2024, Hanafiah called on the federal government and Prime Minister Anwar Ibrahim to abandon the policy of targeted diesel subsidy that was set to be implemented. He argued in a video posted on TikTok that the policy would increase the burden and costs of fishing for him and other fishing enthusiasts, negatively affecting their recreational activity. He further explained that they participate in fishing to unwind and relax after working hard, rather than to earn a living. His call was widely criticised by the netizens who pointed out that subsidies are meant to provide assistance and relief to the groups and fishermen in need, not to support recreational fishing. They argued that subsidising his hobby would be a waste of resources, benefiting wealthy people, foreigners and smugglers instead of those truly in need.

== Election results ==
Terengganu State Legislative Assembly
Year	Constituency		Votes	Pct	Opponent(s)	Votes	Pct	Ballots cast	Majority	Turnout
2008	N31 Cukai	Hanafiah Mat (PAS)	8,772	47.90%	Mohd Awang Tera (UMNO)	9,541	52.10%	18,530	769	81.00%
2013	N31 Cukai	Hanafiah Mat (PAS)	12,457	55.44%	Wan Ahmad Nizam Wan Abdul Hamid (UMNO)	10,011	44.56%	22,707	2,446	85.20%
2018	N31 Cukai	Hanafiah Mat (PAS)	12,428	49.56%	Mohd Awang Tera (UMNO)	7,547	30.09%	25,396	4,881	83.60%
2018	N31 Cukai	Hanafiah Mat (PAS)	12,428	49.56%	Wan Mohd Anies Wan Mohd Adnan (PKR)	5,104	20.35%	25,396	4,881	83.60%
2023	N31 Cukai	Hanafiah Mat (PAS)	18,394	64.13%	Mohamad Rahim Hussin (UMNO)	10,288	35.87%	28,823	8,106	73.56%

== Honours ==
- Terengganu
  - Knight Commander of the Order of the Crown of Terengganu (DPMT) – Dato' (2025)
  - Companion of the Order of Sultan Mizan Zainal Abidin of Terengganu (SMZ) (2022)
