= Mohd Zawawi Ismail =

Malaysian politician (born 1959)

Yang Berhormat Tuan Mohd Zawawi Ismail AMN AMZ PJK MLA
- محمّد زواوي إسماعيل

Deputy Member of the Terengganu State Executive Council

(Infrastructure, Utilities & Rural Development)
- Incumbent
- Assumed office 16 August 2023
- Monarch: Mizan Zainal Abidin
- Menteri Besar: Ahmad Samsuri Mokhtar
- Member: Hanafiah Mat
- Preceded by: Saiful Azmi Suhaili (Infrastructure & Utilies); Hilmi Harun (Rural Development)
- Constituency: Telemung

Member of the Terengganu State Legislative Assembly for Telemung
- Incumbent
- Assumed office 12 August 2023
- Preceded by: Rozi Mamat (BN–UMNO)
- Majority: 295 (2023)

Member of the Terengganu State Legislative Assembly for Kuala Berang
- In office 28 August 2004 – 5 May 2013
- Preceded by: Komaruddin Ab Rahman (BN–UMNO)
- Succeeded by: Tengku Putera Tengku Awang (BN–UMNO)
- Majority: 1,592 (2008)

Personal details
- Born: Mohd Zawawi bin Ismail; 30 November 1959 (age 66) Kampung Telaga, Kuala Berang, Hulu Terengganu, Terengganu
- Party: United Malays National Organisation (UMNO); Malaysian United Indigenous Party (BERSATU) (current)
- Other political affiliations: Barisan Nasional (BN); Perikatan Nasional (PN) (current)
- Education: Maktab Perguruan Raja Melewar
- Occupation: Politician
- Profession: Teacher

Yang Berhormat Tuan Mohd Zawawi bin Ismail (born 30 November 1959) is a Malaysian politician and teacher who has served as Deputy Member of the Terengganu State Executive Council (EXCO) in the Perikatan Nasional (PN) state administration under Menteri Besar Ahmad Samsuri Mokhtar and Member Hanafiah Mat since August 2023 as well as Member of the Terengganu State Legislative Assembly (MLA) for Telemung since August 2023. He served as the MLA for Kuala Berang from March 2008 to May 2013. He is a member of Malaysian United Indigenous Party (BERSATU), a component party of the PN coalition and was a member of the United Malays National Organisation (UMNO), a component party of the Barisan Nasional (BN) coalition.

== Election results ==
Terengganu State Legislative Assembly
Year	Constituency	Candidate	Votes	Pct	Opponent(s)	Votes	Pct	Ballots cast	Majority	Turnout
2004	N23 Kuala Berang	Mohd Zawawi Ismail (UMNO)	6,051	60.25%	Muhyidin Abdul Rashid (PAS)	3,992	39.75%		2,059	
2008	N23 Kuala Berang	Mohd Zawawi Ismail (UMNO)	6,444	57.05%	Muhyiddin Abdul Rashid (PAS)	4,852	42.95%	11,476	1,592	88.01%
2023	N21 Telemung	Mohd Zawawi Ismail (BERSATU)	8,380	50.90%	Rozi Mamat (UMNO)	8,085	49.10%	16,612	295	77.28%

== Honours ==
- Malaysia
  - Member of the Order of the Defender of the Realm (AMN) (2008)
- Terengganu
  - Member of the Order of Sultan Mizan Zainal Abidin of Terengganu (AMZ) (2025)
