= Saiful Azmi Suhaili =

Malaysian politician

Yang Berhormat Tuan Ir. Saiful Azmi Suhaili AMZ MLA
- سيف العزمي بن سهيلي

Deputy Member of the Terengganu State Executive Council
- Incumbent
- Assumed office 16 August 2023 (Health, Local Government and Housing)
- Monarch: Mizan Zainal Abidin
- Menteri Besar: Ahmad Samsuri Mokhtar
- Member: Wan Sukairi Wan Abdullah
- Preceded by: Ahmad Shah Muhamed
- Constituency: Kemasik
- In office 10 May 2018 – 15 August 2023 (Infrastructure, Public Facilities, Utilities and Green Technology)
- Monarch: Mizan Zainal Abidin
- Menteri Besar: Ahmad Samsuri Mokhtar
- Member: Mamad Puteh
- Preceded by: Position established
- Succeeded by: Mohd Zawawi Ismail (Infrastructure & Utilities); Portfolios abolished (Public Facilities & Green Technology)
- Constituency: Kemasik

Member of the Terengganu State Legislative Assembly for Kemasik
- Incumbent
- Assumed office 9 May 2018
- Preceded by: Rosli Othman (BN–UMNO)
- Majority: 2,164 (2018); 6,505 (2023)

Faction represented in Terengganu State Legislative Assembly
- 2018–2020: Malaysian Islamic Party
- 2020–: Perikatan Nasional

Personal details
- Born: Saiful Azmi bin Suhaili; 28 May 1977 (age 49) Terengganu, Malaysia
- Citizenship: Malaysian
- Party: Malaysian Islamic Party (PAS)
- Other political affiliations: Gagasan Sejahtera (GS) (2016–2020); Perikatan Nasional (PN) (since 2020)
- Spouse: Husna Ab Rahman
- Children: 5
- Education: University of Technology
- Occupation: Politician

Saiful Azmi bin Suhaili (born 28 May 1977) is a Malaysian politician who has served as Deputy Member of the Terengganu State Executive Council (EXCO) in the Perikatan Nasional (PN) state administration under Menteri Besar Ahmad Samsuri Mokhtar, Members Mamad Puteh and Wan Sukairi Wan Abdullah as well as Member of the Terengganu State Legislative Assembly (MLA) for Kemasik since May 2018. He is a member of the Malaysian Islamic Party (PAS), a component party of the PN coalition.

== Election results ==
Terengganu State Legislative Assembly
Year	Constituency	Candidate	Votes	Pct	Opponent(s)	Votes	Pct	Ballots cast	Majority	Turnout
2018	N29 Kemasik	Saiful Azmi Suhaili (PAS)	9,645	51.63%	Rosli Othman (UMNO)	7,481	40.04%	18,987	2,164	85.80%
2018	N29 Kemasik	Saiful Azmi Suhaili (PAS)	9,645	51.63%	Rizan Ali (AMANAH)	1,557	8.33%	18,987	2,164	85.80%
2023	N29 Kemasik	Saiful Azmi Suhaili (PAS)	13,778	65.45%	Mohd Khairi Afiq Yusof (UMNO)	7,273	34.55%	21,236	6,505	74.21%

== Honours ==
- Terengganu
  - Member of the Order of Sultan Mizan Zainal Abidin of Terengganu (AMZ) (2025)
