= Cukai =

State electoral division in Malaysia

Cukai (N31)
Terengganu constituency

State constituency
- Legislature: Terengganu State Legislative Assembly
MLA
Hanafiah Mat
PN
- Constituency created: 1959
- First contested: 1959
- Last contested: 2023

Demographics
- Electors (2023): 39,153

N31 Cukai within Terengganu, as used for the 2023 state election

Cukai is a state constituency in Terengganu, Malaysia, that has been represented in the Terengganu State Legislative Assembly.

The state constituency was first contested in 1959 and is mandated to return a single Assemblyman to the Terengganu State Legislative Assembly under the first-past-the-post voting system.

== Demographics ==
Ethnic breakdown of Cukai's electorate as of 2023
1. Malay (86.8%)
2. Chinese (11.4%)
3. Other ethnicities (0.98%)
4. Indian (0.82%)

== History ==
=== Polling districts ===
According to the Gazette issued on 30 March 2018, the Cukai constituency has a total of 14 polling districts.

State Constituency	Polling Districts	Code	Location
Cukai (N31)	Bakau Tinggi	040/31/01	SMK Sultan Ismail
Cukai (N31)	Kampung Besut	040/31/02	SK Seri Kemaman
Cukai (N31)	Kampung Tuan	040/31/03	SK Chukai
Cukai (N31)	Gong Limau	040/31/04	SK Seri Iman
Cukai (N31)	Gong Pauh	040/31/05	SMK Bukit Mentok
Cukai (N31)	Kubang Kurus	040/31/06	SMK Chukai
Cukai (N31)	Banggul	040/31/07	SMK Chukai
Cukai (N31)	Kampung Tengah	040/31/08	SK Chukai
Cukai (N31)	Kuala Kemaman	040/31/09	SK Kuala Kemaman
Cukai (N31)	Geliga	040/31/10	SMK Geliga
Cukai (N31)	Jakar	040/31/11	SJK (C) Chukai
Cukai (N31)	Fikri	040/31/12	SK Mak Lagam
Cukai (N31)	Paya Berenjut	040/31/13	SMK Banggol
Cukai (N31)	Geliga Besar	040/31/14	SK Seri Geliga

=== Representation history ===
Members of the Legislative Assembly for Cukai
Assembly	No	Years	Member	Party
Constituency created
Chukai
1st	N19	1959–1964	Yeo Eng Cho (楊應晫)	Alliance (MCA)
2nd	N19	1964–1969	Mohd Taha Embong	Alliance (UMNO)
		1969–1971	Assembly dissolved	
3rd	N19	1971–1973	Teh Hassan	Alliance (UMNO)
3rd	N19	1973–1974	Teh Hassan	BN (UMNO)
4th	N28	1974–1978	Wan Mokhtar Ahmad	BN (UMNO)
5th	N28	1978–1982	Wan Mokhtar Ahmad	BN (UMNO)
6th	N28	1982–1986	Wan Mokhtar Ahmad	BN (UMNO)
Cukai
7th	N31	1986–1990	Wan Mokhtar Ahmad	BN (UMNO)
8th	N31	1990–1995	Wan Mokhtar Ahmad	BN (UMNO)
9th	N31	1995–1999	Wan Mokhtar Ahmad	BN (UMNO)
10th	N31	1999–2004	Awang Jusoh	PAS
11th	N31	2004–2008	Mohamad Awang Tera	BN (UMNO)
12th	N31	2008–2013	Mohamad Awang Tera	BN (UMNO)
13th	N31	2013–2018	Hanafiah Mat	PR (PAS)
14th	N31	2018–2020	Hanafiah Mat	PAS
14th	N31	2020–2023	Hanafiah Mat	PN (PAS)
15th	N31	2023–present	Hanafiah Mat	PN (PAS)

== Election results ==
Terengganu state election, 2023: Cukai
Party	Candidate	Votes	%	∆%
PAS	Hanafiah Mat	18,394	64.13	▲14.58
BN	Mohamed Rahim Hussin	10,288	35.87	▲5.78
Total valid votes		28,682	100.00	
Total rejected ballots		120		
Unreturned ballots		21		
Turnout		28,823	73.62	▼9.99
Registered electors		39,153		
Majority		8,106	28.26	▲8.80
PAS hold		Swing		

Terengganu state election, 2018: Cukai
Party	Candidate	Votes	%	∆%
PAS	Hanafiah Mat	12,428	49.56	▼5.89
BN	Mohamed Awang Tera	7,547	30.09	▼14.46
PKR	Wan Mohd Anies Wan Mohd Adnan	5,104	20.35	▲20.35
Total valid votes		25,079	100.00	
Total rejected ballots		228		
Unreturned ballots		89		
Turnout		25,396	83.61	▼1.45
Registered electors		30,374		
Majority		4,881	19.46	▲8.58
PAS hold		Swing		

Terengganu state election, 2013: Cukai
Party	Candidate	Votes	%	∆%
PAS	Hanafiah Mat	12,457	55.44	▲7.54
BN	Wan Ahmad Nizam Wan Abdul Hamid	10,011	44.56	▼7.54
Total valid votes		22,468	100.00	
Total rejected ballots		239		
Unreturned ballots		16		
Turnout		22,723	85.06	▲4.06
Registered electors		26,715		
Majority		2,446	10.89	▲6.69
PAS gain from BN		Swing		-

Terengganu state election, 2008: Cukai
Party	Candidate	Votes	%	∆%
BN	Mohamed Awang Tera	9,541	52.10	▼5.95
PAS	Hanafiah Mat	8,772	47.90	▲5.95
Total valid votes		18,313	100.00	
Total rejected ballots		193		
Unreturned ballots		24		
Turnout		18,530	81.00	▼4.43
Registered electors		22,877		
Majority		769	4.20	▼11.91
BN hold		Swing		

Terengganu state election, 2004: Cukai
Party	Candidate	Votes	%	∆%
BN	Mohamed Awang Tera	10,145	58.05	▲9.77
PAS	Alias Abdul Rahman	7,330	41.95	▼9.77
Total valid votes		17,475	100.00	
Total rejected ballots		200		
Unreturned ballots		0		
Turnout		17,675	85.42	▲7.77
Registered electors		20,691		
Majority		2,815	16.11	▲12.67
BN gain from PAS		Swing		-

Terengganu state election, 1999: Cukai
Party	Candidate	Votes	%	∆%
PAS	Awang Dagang Jusoh	6,564	51.72	▲51.72
BN	Wan Mokhtar Wan Ahmad	6,128	48.28	▼12.48
Total valid votes		12,692	100.00	
Total rejected ballots		202		
Unreturned ballots		11		
Turnout		12,905	77.66	▲0.89
Registered electors		16,618		
Majority		436	3.44	▼18.10
PAS gain from BN		Swing		-

Terengganu state election, 1995: Cukai
Party	Candidate	Votes	%	∆%
BN	Wan Mokhtar Wan Ahmad	7,256	60.77	▲2.37
PAS	Alias Abdul Rahman	4,685	39.23	▼2.37
Total valid votes		11,941	100.00	
Total rejected ballots		270		
Unreturned ballots		60		
Turnout		12,271	76.77	▼1.10
Registered electors		15,984		
Majority		2,571	21.53	▲4.75
BN hold		Swing		

Terengganu state election, 1990: Cukai
Party	Candidate	Votes	%	∆%
BN	Wan Mokhtar Wan Ahmad	6,206	58.39	▼8.73
PAS	Alias Abdul Rahman	4,422	41.61	▲41.61
Total valid votes		10,628	100.00	
Total rejected ballots		336		
Unreturned ballots		23		
Turnout		10,987	77.87	▲5.70
Registered electors		14,109		
Majority		1,784	16.79	▼19.37
BN hold		Swing		

Terengganu state election, 1986: Cukai
Party	Candidate	Votes	%	∆%
BN	Wan Mokhtar Wan Ahmad	5,562	67.13	▲4.69
PAS	Awang Dagang Jusoh	2,566	30.97	▼3.35
SDP	Zainal Abidin Mustafa	158	1.91	▲1.91
Total valid votes		8,286	100.00	
Total rejected ballots		364		
Unreturned ballots		0		
Turnout		8,650	72.17	▼1.63
Registered electors		11,986		
Majority		2,996	36.16	▲8.04
BN hold		Swing		

Terengganu state election, 1982: Chukai
Party	Candidate	Votes	%	∆%
BN	Wan Mokhtar Wan Ahmad	4,747	62.44	
PAS	Syed Agil Syed Mohsin	2,609	34.32	
Independent	Abu Bakar Omar	247	3.25	
Total valid votes		7,603	100.00	
Total rejected ballots		233		
Unreturned ballots		0		
Turnout		7,836	73.80	▲73.80
Registered electors		10,618		
Majority		2,138	28.12	▲28.12
BN hold		Swing		

Terengganu state election, 1978: Chukai
Party	Candidate	Votes	%	∆%
On the nomination day, Wan Mokhtar Wan Ahmad won uncontested.
BN	Wan Mokhtar Wan Ahmad			
Total valid votes				
Total rejected ballots				
Unreturned ballots				
Turnout				
Registered electors		9,494		
Majority				
BN hold		Swing		

Terengganu state election, 1974: Chukai
Party	Candidate	Votes	%	∆%
BN	Wan Mokhtar Wan Ahmad	3,429	64.86	▲10.68
Parti Sosialis Rakyat Malaysia	Mohamad Abdul Rahman	1,858	35.14	▲35.14
Total valid votes		5,287	100.00	
Total rejected ballots		472		
Unreturned ballots		0		
Turnout		5,759	69.19	▲0.78
Registered electors		8,324		
Majority		1,571	29.71	▲17.32
BN gain from Alliance		Swing		-

Terengganu state election, 1969: Chukai
Party	Candidate	Votes	%	∆%
Alliance	Teh Binti Hassan	1,867	54.18	▼12.36
PMIP	Mohd. Shaffi H. G. Ahmad	1,440	41.79	▲36.36
Independent	Ismail Yusoff	139	4.03	▲4.03
Total valid votes		3,446	100.00	
Total rejected ballots		231		
Unreturned ballots		0		
Turnout		3,677	68.41	▼4.11
Registered electors		5,375		
Majority		427	12.39	▼26.11
Alliance hold		Swing		

Terengganu state election, 1964: Chukai
Party	Candidate	Votes	%	∆%
Alliance	Mohd. Taha Embong	2,084	66.54	▲66.54
Socialist Front	Wan Hamid Wan Ibrahim	878	28.03	▲10.63
PMIP	Othman Awang	170	5.43	▼3.75
Total valid votes		3,132	100.00	
Total rejected ballots		170		
Unreturned ballots		0		
Turnout		3,302	72.52	▲1.90
Registered electors		4,553		
Majority		1,206	38.51	▲0.06
Alliance hold		Swing		

Terengganu state election, 1959: Chukai
Party	Candidate	Votes	%
Alliance	Yeo Eng Cho	1,521	55.86
Socialist Front	Abu Bakar Mohd. Amin	474	17.41
National Party	Abdullah Yusof	394	14.47
PMIP	Wan Ngah Abdul Rahman	250	9.18
Independent	Mohammad Omar	84	3.08
Total valid votes		2,723	100.00
Total rejected ballots		59	
Unreturned ballots		0	
Turnout		2,782	70.63
Registered electors		3,939	
Majority		1,047	38.45
This was a new constituency created.
