= Maliaman Kassim =

Malaysian politician and teacher

Yang Berhormat Ustaz Maliaman Kassim AMT MLA
- ماليامن بن قاسم

Member of the Terengganu State Executive Council (Welfare, Women and Family Development & National Unity) (Note: Assumed portfolios on 16 August 2023.)
- Incumbent
- Assumed office 15 August 2023
- Monarch: Mizan Zainal Abidin
- Menteri Besar: Ahmad Samsuri Mokhtar
- Deputy: Zuraida Md Noor
- Preceded by: Hanafiah Mat
- Constituency: Ajil

Deputy Member of the Terengganu State Executive Council (Syariah Implementation, Education & Higher Education)
- In office 10 May 2018 – 15 August 2023
- Monarch: Mizan Zainal Abidin
- Menteri Besar: Ahmad Samsuri Mokhtar
- Member: Satiful Bahri Mamat
- Preceded by: Position established
- Succeeded by: Ahmad Shah Muhamed (Education & Higher Education); Ridzuan Hashim (Syariah Implementation)
- Constituency: Ajil

Member of the Terengganu State Legislative Assembly for Ajil
- Incumbent
- Assumed office 9 May 2018
- Preceded by: Ghazali Taib (BN–UMNO)
- Majority: 4 (2018); 6,258 (2023)

Personal details
- Born: Maliaman bin Kassim; 3 February 1963 (age 63) Terengganu, Malaysia
- Citizenship: Malaysian
- Party: Malaysian Islamic Party (PAS)
- Other political affiliations: Pakatan Rakyat (PR) (2008–2015); Gagasan Sejahtera (GS) (2016–2020); Perikatan Nasional (PN) (since 2020)
- Occupation: Politician
- Profession: Teacher

Maliaman bin Kassim (born 3 February 1963) is a Malaysian politician and teacher who has served as Member of the Terengganu State Executive Council (EXCO) in the Perikatan Nasional (PN) state administration under Menteri Besar Ahmad Samsuri Mokhtar and Member of the Terengganu State Legislative Assembly (MLA) for Ajil since May 2018. He is a member of the Malaysian Islamic Party (PAS), a component party of the PN coalition. He is also the elected representative and election winner with the smallest ever majority in the electoral history of Terengganu and Malaysia, narrowly winning the Ajil state seat by a majority of only 4 votes in the 2018 Terengganu state election.

== Election results ==
Terengganu State Legislative Assembly
Year	Constituency	Candidate	Votes	Pct	Opponent(s)	Votes	Pct	Ballots cast	Majority	Turnout
2018	N24 Ajil	Maliaman Kassim (PAS)	8,132	48.01%	Ghazali Taib (UMNO)	8,128	47.98%	17,294	4	84.20%
2018	N24 Ajil	Maliaman Kassim (PAS)	8,132	48.01%	Zamani Mamat (BERSATU)	679	4.01%	17,294	4	84.20%
2023	N24 Ajil	Maliaman Kassim (PAS)	12,362	66.94%	Jailani Johari (UMNO)	6,104	33.06%	18,598	6,258	74.62%

== Honours ==
- Terengganu
  - Member of the Order of the Crown of Terengganu (AMT) (2023)
