= Ajil (state constituency) =

Political subdivision in Malaysia

Ajil (N24)
Terengganu constituency

State constituency
- Legislature: Terengganu State Legislative Assembly
MLA
Maliaman Kassim
PN
- Constituency created: 1994
- First contested: 1995
- Last contested: 2023

Demographics
- Electors (2023): 24,922

N24 Ajil within Terengganu, as used for the 2023 state election

Ajil is a state constituency in Terengganu, Malaysia, that has been represented in the Terengganu State Legislative Assembly.

The state constituency was first contested in 1995 and is mandated to return a single Assemblyman to the Terengganu State Legislative Assembly under the first-past-the-post voting system.

== Demographics ==
Ethnic breakdown of Ajil's electorate as of 2018
1. Malay (99.0%)
2. Chinese (0.70%)
3. Other ethnicities (0.28%)
4. Indian (0.06%)

== History ==
=== Polling districts ===
According to the gazette issued on 30 March 2018, the Ajil constituency has a total of 16 polling districts.

State Constituency	Polling Districts	Code	Location
Ajil (N24)	Bukit Perah	038/24/01	SK Bukit Perah
Ajil (N24)	Bukit Apit	038/24/02	SK Bukit Apit
Ajil (N24)	Tok Randok	038/23/03	SK Tok Randok
Ajil (N24)	Pengkalan Ajal	038/24/04	SK Kua
Ajil (N24)	Bukit Diman	038/24/05	SK Bukit Diman
Ajil (N24)	Bukir Bading	038/24/06	SK LKTP Bukit Bading
Ajil (N24)	Landas	038/24/07	SMK Landas
Ajil (N24)	Peruh	038/24/08	SK Peroh
Ajil (N24)	Menerung	038/24/09	SK Menerong
Ajil (N24)	Lubuk Periuk	038/24/10	SK Lubuk Periok
Ajil (N24)	Pekan Ajil	038/24/11	SK Ajil
Ajil (N24)	FELDA Tersat	038/24/12	SK (FELDA) Tersat
Ajil (N24)	FELDA Jerangau Barat	038/24/13	SK (FELDA) Jerangau Barat
Ajil (N24)	Pereh	038/24/14	SK Pereh
Ajil (N24)	Betung	038/24/15	SK Betong
Ajil (N24)	FELDA Mengkawang	038/24/16	SK (FELDA) Mengkawang

=== Representation history ===
Members of the Legislative Assembly for Ajil
Assembly	No	Years	Members	Party
Constituency created from Tanggul and Kuala Berang
9th	N24	1995–1999	Othman Daud	BN (UMNO)
10th	N24	1999–2004	Rosol Wahid	BN (UMNO)
11th	N24	2004–2008	Rosol Wahid	BN (UMNO)
12th	N24	2008–2013	Rosol Wahid	BN (UMNO)
13th	N24	2013–2018	Ghazali Taib	BN (UMNO)
14th	N24	2018–2020	Maliaman Kassim	PAS
14th	N24	2020–2023	Maliaman Kassim	PN (PAS)
15th	N24	2023–present	Maliaman Kassim	PN (PAS)

== Election results ==
Terengganu state election, 2023
Party	Candidate	Votes	%	∆%
PAS	Maliaman Kassim	12,362	66.94	▲18.94
BN	Jailani Johari	6,104	33.06	▼14.93
Total valid votes		18,466	100.00	
Total rejected ballots		132		
Unreturned ballots		12		
Turnout		18,610	74.67	▼9.56
Registered electors		24,922		
Majority		6,258	33.89	▲33.87
PAS hold		Swing		

Terengganu state election, 2018
Party	Candidate	Votes	%	∆%
PAS	Maliaman Kassim	8,132	48.01	▲9.33
BN	Ghazali Taib	8,128	47.98	▼8.94
PKR	Zamani Mamat	679	4.01	▲4.01
Total valid votes		16,939	100.00	
Total rejected ballots		285		
Unreturned ballots		70		
Turnout		17,294	84.23	▼3.07
Registered electors		20,532		
Majority		4	0.02	▼18.22
PAS gain from BN		Swing		-

Terengganu state election, 2013
Party	Candidate	Votes	%	∆%
BN	Ghazali Taib	8,680	56.93	▼12.24
PAS	Mohd Razki Yah @ Alias	5,898	38.68	▲7.84
Independent	Mohd Nuhairi Muhammad	670	4.39	▲4.39
Total valid votes		15,248	100.00	
Total rejected ballots		305		
Unreturned ballots		16		
Turnout		15,569	87.30	▲1.13
Registered electors		17,834		
Majority		2,782	18.25	▼20.08
BN hold		Swing		

Terengganu state election, 2008
Party	Candidate	Votes	%	∆%
BN	Rosol Wahid	8,530	69.16	▲1.95
PAS	Mohd Razki Yah @ Alias	3,803	30.84	▼1.95
Total valid votes		12,333	100.00	
Total rejected ballots		186		
Unreturned ballots		12		
Turnout		12,531	86.17	▼2.52
Registered electors		14,543		
Majority		4,727	38.33	▲3.90
BN hold		Swing		

Terengganu state election, 2004
Party	Candidate	Votes	%	∆%
BN	Rosol Wahid	7,386	67.21	▲16.48
PAS	Mohd Razki Yah @ Alias	3,603	32.79	▼16.48
Total valid votes		10,989	100.00	
Total rejected ballots		142		
Unreturned ballots		6		
Turnout		11,137	88.68	▲4.06
Registered electors		12,558		
Majority		3,783	34.43	▲32.95
BN hold		Swing		

Terengganu state election, 1999
Party	Candidate	Votes	%	∆%
BN	Rosol Wahid	4,313	50.74	▼11.01
PAS	Ismail Osman	4,188	49.26	▲49.26
Total valid votes		8,501	100.00	
Total rejected ballots		308		
Unreturned ballots		0		
Turnout		8,809	84.63	▼0.97
Registered electors		10,409		
Majority		125	1.47	▼22.01
BN hold		Swing		

Terengganu state election, 1995
Party	Candidate	Votes	%	∆%
BN	Othman Daud	5,166	61.74	▲2.74
S46	Tengku Ibrahim Sultan Ismail	3,201	38.26	▲38.26
Total valid votes		8,367	100.00	
Total rejected ballots		228		
Unreturned ballots		10		
Turnout		8,605	85.60	▼1.18
Registered electors		10,053		
Majority		1,965	23.49	▲5.48
This was a new constituency created.
