= Bukit Besi (state constituency) =

Political subdivision in Malaysia

Bukit Besi (N25)
Terengganu constituency

State constituency
- Legislature: Terengganu State Legislative Assembly
MLA
Ghazali Sulaiman
PN
- Constituency created: 1994
- First contested: 1995
- Last contested: 2023

Demographics
- Electors (2023): 18,195

N25 Bukit Besi within Terengganu, as used for the 2023 state election

Bukit Besi is a state constituency in Terengganu, Malaysia, that has been represented in the Terengganu State Legislative Assembly.

The state constituency was first contested in 1995 and is mandated to return a single Assemblyman to the Terengganu State Legislative Assembly under the first-past-the-post voting system.

== Demographics ==
Ethnic breakdown of Bukit Besi's electorate as of 2018
1. Malay (99.3%)
2. Other ethnicities (0.41%)
3. Chinese (0.20%)
4. Indian (0.10%)

== History ==
=== Polling districts ===
According to the Gazette issued on 30 March 2018, the Bukit Besi constituency has a total of 12 polling districts.

State Constituency	Polling Districts	Code	Location
Bukit Besi (N25)	FELDA Jerangau	039/25/01	SK LKTP Jerangau
Bukit Besi (N25)	Nerang	039/25/02	SMK Jerangau
Bukit Besi (N25)	Tepus	039/25/03	SK Tepus
Bukit Besi (N25)	Dendang	039/25/04	SK Dendang
Bukit Besi (N25)	Bukit Besi	039/25/05	SK Bukit Besi
Bukit Besi (N25)	Al-Muktafi Billah Shah	039/25/06	SMK Durian Mas
Bukit Besi (N25)	Kuala Jengai	039/25/07	SK Kuala Jengal
Bukit Besi (N25)	Pasir Raja	039/25/08	SK Pasir Raja
Bukit Besi (N25)	Shukor	039/25/09	SK Kampung Shukor
Bukit Besi (N25)	Jongok Batu	039/25/10	SK Jongok Batu
Bukit Besi (N25)	Lintang	039/25/11	SK Lintang
Bukit Besi (N25)	Minda	039/25/12	SK Minda Talong

=== Representation history ===
Members of the Legislative Assembly for Bukit Besi
Assembly	No	Years	Member	Party
Constituency created from Jerangau and Paka
9th	N25	1995–1999	Awang A. Jabar	BN (UMNO)
10th	N25	1999–2004	Roslan Ahmad	PAS
11th	N25	2004–2008	Din Adam	BN (UMNO)
12th	N25	2008–2013	Din Adam	BN (UMNO)
13th	N25	2013–2018	Roslee Daud	BN (UMNO)
14th	N25	2018–2023	Roslee Daud	BN (UMNO)
15th	N25	2023–present	Ghazali Sulaiman	PN (PAS)

== Election results ==
Terengganu state election, 2023
Party	Candidate	Votes	%	∆%
PAS	Ghazali Sulaiman	8,552	63.86	▲16.08
BN	Din Adam	4,840	36.14	▼12.02
Total valid votes		13,392	100.00	
Total rejected ballots		93		
Unreturned ballots		10		
Turnout		13,495	74.17	▼10.28
Registered electors		18,195		
Majority		3,712	27.72	▲27.33
PAS gain from BN		Swing		?

Terengganu state election, 2018
Party	Candidate	Votes	%	∆%
BN	Roslee Daud	5,770	48.16	▼12.81
PAS	Ghazali Sulaiman	5,724	47.78	▲9.20
PKR	Mohamad Arif Arifin	487	4.06	▲4.06
Total valid votes		11,981	100.00	
Total rejected ballots		189		
Unreturned ballots		69		
Turnout		12,239	84.45	▼2.81
Registered electors		14,493		
Majority		46	0.38	▼22.00
BN hold		Swing		

Terengganu state election, 2013
Party	Candidate	Votes	%	∆%
BN	Roslee Daud	6,966	60.97	▼2.04
PAS	Roslan Ismail	4,408	38.58	▲1.58
PKR	Mohd Shamsul Mat Amin	52	0.46	▲0.46
Total valid votes		11,426	100.00	
Total rejected ballots		222		
Unreturned ballots		33		
Turnout		11,681	87.26	▲2.74
Registered electors		13,387		
Majority		2,558	22.39	▼3.62
BN hold		Swing		

Terengganu state election, 2008
Party	Candidate	Votes	%	∆%
BN	Din Adam	6,037	63.00	▲0.19
PAS	Nordin Othman	3,545	37.00	▼0.19
Total valid votes		9,582	100.00	
Total rejected ballots		144		
Unreturned ballots		10		
Turnout		9,736	84.51	▼4.36
Registered electors		11,520		
Majority		2,492	26.01	▲0.39
BN hold		Swing		

Terengganu state election, 2004
Party	Candidate	Votes	%	∆%
BN	Din Adam	5,614	62.81	▲13.46
PAS	Roslan Ismail	3,324	37.19	▼13.46
Total valid votes		8,938	100.00	
Total rejected ballots		100		
Unreturned ballots		1		
Turnout		9,039	88.87	▲4.95
Registered electors		10,171		
Majority		2,290	25.62	▲24.31
BN gain from PAS		Swing		-

Terengganu state election, 1999
Party	Candidate	Votes	%	∆%
PAS	Roslan Ismail	3,368	50.65	▲50.65
BN	Awang Abdul Jabar	3,281	49.35	▼12.82
Total valid votes		6,649	100.00	
Total rejected ballots		179		
Unreturned ballots		20		
Turnout		6,848	83.92	▲2.91
Registered electors		8,160		
Majority		87	1.31	▼23.03
PAS gain from BN		Swing		-

Terengganu state election, 1995
Party	Candidate	Votes	%
BN	Awang Abdul Jabar	3,834	62.17
S46	Tengku Mohd Asri Tengku Hashim	2,333	37.83
Total valid votes		6,167	100.00
Total rejected ballots		189	
Unreturned ballots		7	
Turnout		6,363	81.02
Registered electors		7,854	
Majority		1,501	24.34
This was a new constituency created.
