= Mamad Puteh =

Malaysian politician and doctor

Yang Berhormat Tuan Dr. Mamad Puteh SMZ PJK MLA
- ماماد ڤوته

Deputy Member of the Terengganu State Executive Council (Economy, Finance, Investment, Land and Natural Resources)
- Incumbent
- Assumed office 16 August 2023
- Monarch: Mizan Zainal Abidin
- Menteri Besar: Ahmad Samsuri Mokhtar
- Member: Ahmad Samsuri Mokhtar
- Preceded by: Position established
- Constituency: Kuala Berang

Member of the Terengganu State Executive Council (Infrastructure, Public Facilities, Utilities and Green Technology)
- In office 10 May 2018 – 15 August 2023
- Monarch: Mizan Zainal Abidin
- Menteri Besar: Ahmad Samsuri Mokhtar
- Deputy: Saiful Azmi Suhaili
- Preceded by: Rosli Othman (Infrastructure, Public Facilities, Utilities); A Latiff Awang (Green Technology)
- Succeeded by: Hanafiah Mat (Infrastructure, Public Facilities & Utilies); Mohd Nurkhuzaini Ab Rahman (Green Technology)
- Constituency: Kuala Berang

Member of the Terengganu State Legislative Assembly for Kuala Berang
- Incumbent
- Assumed office 9 May 2018
- Preceded by: Tengku Putera Tengku Awang (BN–UMNO)
- Majority: 1,070 (2018); 5,917 (2023)
- In office 29 November 1999 – 21 March 2004
- Preceded by: Ibrahim Yusof (BN–UMNO)
- Succeeded by: Komaruddin Abdul Rahman (BN–UMNO)
- Majority: 1,844 (1999)

Faction represented in Terengganu State Legislative Assembly
- 1999–2004: Malaysian Islamic Party
- 2018–2020: Malaysian Islamic Party
- 2020–: Perikatan Nasional

Personal details
- Born: Mamad bin Puteh; 5 August 1956 (age 70) Kampung Rhu Dua, Marang, Terengganu, Federation of Malaya (now Malaysia)
- Citizenship: Malaysian
- Party: Malaysian Islamic Party (PAS)
- Other political affiliations: Barisan Alternatif (BA) (1999–2004); Pakatan Rakyat (PR) (2008–2015); Gagasan Sejahtera (GS) (2016–2020); Perikatan Nasional (PN) (since 2020)
- Education: National University of Malaysia
- Occupation: Politician
- Profession: Doctor

Mamad Puteh (born 5 August 1956) is a Malaysian politician and doctor who has served as Deputy Member of the Terengganu State Executive Council (EXCO) in the Perikatan Nasional (PN) state administration under Menteri Besar and Member Ahmad Samsuri Mokhtar since August 2023 as well as Member of the Terengganu State Legislative Assembly (MLA) for Kuala Berang from November 1999 to March 2004 and again since May 2018. He served as Member of the Terengganu State EXCO in the PN state administration under Menteri Besar Ahmad Samsuri from May 2018 to his demotion in August 2023. He is a member of the Malaysian Islamic Party (PAS), a component party of the PN coalition. His appointment as the Terengganu Deputy EXCO Member in August 2023 is a demotion that is rare in Malaysian politics.

Mamad was elected into the Terengganu State Legislative Assembly as the Kuala Berang MLA for the first term in the 1999 Terengganu state election by a total of 7,707 votes. In the 2004 Terengganu state election, his failed to defend the seat and be reelected as the Kuala Betang MLA after his defeat to Komarudin Abdul Rahman of Barisan Nasional (BN). In the 2018 Terengganu state election, he regained the seat and was reelected as the Kuala Berang MLA for the second term by the majority of 1,070 votes.

Mamad was born in Kampung Rhu Dua, Marang, Terengganu, Malaysia on 5 August 1956. He has lived in Kampung Sungai Petai, Kuala Berang, Terengganu, Malaysia for more than 30 years.

== Election results ==
Terengganu State Legislative Assembly
Year	Constituency	Candidate	Votes	Pct	Opponent(s)	Votes	Pct	Ballots cast	Majority	Turnout
1999	N23 Kuala Berang	Mamad Puteh (PAS)	4,968	61.39%	Abdullah Ismail (UMNO)	3,124	38.61%	8,313	1,844	85.37%
2004	N23 Kuala Berang	Mamad Puteh (PAS)	4,231	41.66%	Komaruddin Ab. Rahman (UMNO)	5,926	58.34%	10,276	1,695	89.85%
2018	N23 Kuala Berang	Mamad Puteh (PAS)	7,707	50.33%	Tengku Putera Tengku Awang (UMNO)	6,637	43.34%	15,571	1,070	87.20%
2018	N23 Kuala Berang	Mamad Puteh (PAS)	7,707	50.33%	Mohd Nor Othman (PKR)	969	6.33%	15,571	1,070	87.20%
2023	N23 Kuala Berang	Mamad Puteh (PAS)	11,270	67.80%	Jalaludin Ismail (UMNO)	5,353	32.20%	16,711	5,917	77.99%

== Honours ==
- Terengganu
  - Companion of the Order of Sultan Mizan Zainal Abidin of Terengganu (SMZ) (2022)
  - Meritorious Service Medal (PJK) (2002)
