= Kuala Berang (state constituency) =

Political subdivision in Malaysia

Kuala Berang (N23)
Terengganu constituency

State constituency
- Legislature: Terengganu State Legislative Assembly
MLA
Mamad Puteh
PN
- Constituency created: 1973
- First contested: 1974
- Last contested: 2023

Demographics
- Electors (2023): 21,428

N23 Kuala Berang within Terengganu, as used for the 2023 state election

Kuala Berang is a state constituency in Terengganu, Malaysia, that has been represented in the Terengganu State Legislative Assembly.

The state constituency was first contested in 1974 and is mandated to return a single Assemblyman to the Terengganu State Legislative Assembly under the first-past-the-post voting system.

== Demographics ==
Ethnic breakdown of Kuala Berang's electorate as of 2018
1. Malay (99.0%)
2. Chinese (0.72%)
3. Other ethnicities (0.21%)
4. Indian (0.05%)

== History ==
=== Polling districts ===
According to the Gazette issued on 30 March 2018, the Kuala Berang constituency has a total of 13 polling districts.

State Constituency	Polling Districts	Code	Location
Kuala Berang (N23)	Getang	038/23/01	SK Getang
Kuala Berang (N23)	Pasir Tinggi	038/23/02	SK Pasir Tinggi
Kuala Berang (N23)	Sungai Ular	038/23/03	SK Binjai Kertas
Kuala Berang (N23)	Tanggul	038/23/04	SK Tanggol
Kuala Berang (N23)	Bandar Kuala Berang	038/23/05	SK Kuala Berang
Kuala Berang (N23)	Bukit Tok Bat	038/23/06	SK Tengku Ampuan Intan
Kuala Berang (N23)	Telaga	038/28/07	SMK Telaga
Kuala Berang (N23)	Tanjung Putat	038/23/08	SMK Tengku Ampuan Intan
Kuala Berang (N23)	Langgar	038/23/09	SK Langgar
Kuala Berang (N23)	Kampung Buluh	038/23/10	SK Seri Buluh
Kuala Berang (N23)	Tapu	038/23/11	SK Tapu
Kuala Berang (N23)	Sungai Petai	038/23/12	SK Seri Berang
Kuala Berang (N23)	Tajin	038/23/13	SM Sains Hulu Terengganu

=== Representation history ===
Members of the Legislative Assembly for Kuala Berang
Assembly	No	Years	Member	Party
Constituency created from Ulu Trengganu Timor, Ulu Trengganu Barat and Ulu Dungun
Kuala Brang
4th	N12	1974–1978	Abdul Rashid Su	BN (PAS)
5th	N12	1978–1982	Mohamed Nor Abdullah	BN (UMNO)
6th	N12	1982–1986	Wan Muda Wan Mohamed	BN (UMNO)
Kuala Berang
7th	N23	1986–1990	Wan Muda Wan Mohamed	BN (UMNO)
8th	N23	1990–1995	Wan Muda Wan Mohamed	BN (UMNO)
9th	N23	1995–1999	Ibrahim Yusof	BN (UMNO)
10th	N23	1999–2004	Mamad Puteh	PAS
11th	N23	2004	Komaruddin Ab. Rahman	BN (UMNO)
11th	N23	2004–2008	Mohd Zawawi Ismail	BN (UMNO)
12th	N23	2008–2013	Mohd Zawawi Ismail	BN (UMNO)
13th	N23	2013–2018	Tengku Putera Tengku Awang	BN (UMNO)
14th	N23	2018–2020	Mamad Puteh	PAS
14th	N23	2020–2023	Mamad Puteh	PN (PAS)
15th	N23	2023–present	Mamad Puteh	PN (PAS)

== Election results ==
Terengganu state election, 2023
Party	Candidate	Votes	%	∆%
PAS	Mamad Puteh	11,270	67.80	▲17.47
BN	Jalaludin Ismail	5,353	32.20	▼11.14
Total valid votes		15,313	100.00	
Total rejected ballots		199		
Unreturned ballots		59		
Turnout		15,571	87.24	▼2.11
Registered electors		17,848		
Majority		1,070	6.99	▲3.63
PAS hold		Swing		

Terengganu state election, 2018
Party	Candidate	Votes	%	∆%
PAS	Mamad Puteh	7,707	50.33	▲2.01
BN	Tengku Putera Tengku Awang	6,637	43.34	▼8.34
PKR	Mohd Nor Othman	969	6.33	▲6.33
Total valid votes		13,385	100.00	
Total rejected ballots		280		
Unreturned ballots		32		
Turnout		13,697	89.35	▲1.34
Registered electors		15,330		
Majority		449	3.35	▼10.74
PAS gain from BN		Swing		?

Terengganu state election, 2013
Party	Candidate	Votes	%	∆%
BN	Tengku Putera Tengku Awang	6,917	51.68	▼5.37
PAS	Muhyidin Abdul Rashid	6,468	48.32	▲5.37
Total valid votes		11,296	100.00	
Total rejected ballots		156		
Unreturned ballots		24		
Turnout		11,476	88.01	▼0.77
Registered electors		13,040		
Majority		1,592	14.09	▼6.41
BN hold		Swing		

Terengganu state election, 2008
Party	Candidate	Votes	%	∆%
BN	Mohd Zawawi Ismail	6,444	57.05	▼3.20
PAS	Muhyidin Abdul Rashid	4,852	42.95	▲3.20
Total valid votes		10,043	100.00	
Total rejected ballots		103		
Unreturned ballots		1		
Turnout		10,147	88.78	▼1.07
Registered electors		11,430		
Majority		2,059	20.50	▲3.81
BN hold		Swing		

Terengganu state by-election, 28 August 2004 Upon the death of the incumbent, Komarudin Abdul Rahman
Party	Candidate	Votes	%	∆%
BN	Mohd Zawawi Ismail	6,051	60.25	▲1.91
PAS	Muhyidin Abdul Rashid	3,992	39.75	▼1.91
Total valid votes		10,043	100.00	
Total rejected ballots		103		
Unreturned ballots		1		
Turnout		10,147	88.78	▼1.07
Registered electors		11,430		
Majority		2,059	20.50	▲3.81
BN hold		Swing		

Terengganu state election, 2004
Party	Candidate	Votes	%	∆%
BN	Komarudin Abdul Rahman	5,926	58.34	▲19.74
PAS	Mamad Puteh	4,231	41.66	▼19.74
Total valid votes		10,157	100.00	
Total rejected ballots		111		
Unreturned ballots		8		
Turnout		10,276	89.85	▲4.48
Registered electors		11,437		
Majority		1,695	16.69	▼6.10
BN gain from PAS		Swing		?

Terengganu state election, 1999
Party	Candidate	Votes	%	∆%
PAS	Mamad Puteh	4,968	61.40	
BN	Abdullah Ismail	3,124	38.60	
Total valid votes		8,092	100.00	
Total rejected ballots		204		
Unreturned ballots		17		
Turnout		8,313	85.37	▲2.22
Registered electors		9,738		
Majority		1,844	22.79	▲11.16
PAS gain from BN		Swing		?

Terengganu state election, 1995
Party	Candidate	Votes	%	∆%
BN	Ibrahim Yusof	4,301	55.81	▼3.19
PAS	Muhyidin Abdul Rashid	3,405	44.19	▲3.19
Total valid votes		7,706	100.00	
Total rejected ballots		163		
Unreturned ballots		21		
Turnout		7,890	83.15	▼3.63
Registered electors		9,489		
Majority		896	11.63	▼6.38
BN hold		Swing		

Terengganu state election, 1990
Party	Candidate	Votes	%	∆%
BN	Wan Muda Mohd	4,433	59.00	▼2.65
PAS	Daud Hassan	3,080	41.00	▲2.65
Total valid votes		7,513	100.00	
Total rejected ballots		283		
Unreturned ballots		12		
Turnout		7,808	86.77	▲2.36
Registered electors		8,998		
Majority		1,353	18.01	▼5.31
BN hold		Swing		

Terengganu state election, 1986
Party	Candidate	Votes	%	∆%
BN	Wan Muda Mohd	3,882	61.66	▲10.62
PAS	Mohd. Ghazali Ahmad	2,414	38.34	▼10.62
Total valid votes		6,296	100.00	
Total rejected ballots		300		
Unreturned ballots		0		
Turnout		6,596	84.41	▲0.22
Registered electors		7,814		
Majority		1,468	23.32	▲21.25
BN hold		Swing		

Terengganu state election, 1982: Kuala Brang
Party	Candidate	Votes	%	∆%
BN	Wan Muda Mohd	2,518	51.03	▲6.02
PAS	Mohd. Ghazali Ahmad	2,416	48.97	▲25.17
Total valid votes		4,934	100.00	
Total rejected ballots		158		
Unreturned ballots		0		
Turnout		5,092	84.19	▲2.31
Registered electors		6,048		
Majority		102	2.07	▼11.75
BN hold		Swing		

Terengganu state election, 1978: Kuala Brang
Party	Candidate	Votes	%	∆%
BN	Mohd. Nor Abdullah	1,876	45.01	▲45.01
Parti Sosialis Rakyat Malaysia	Bakar Ahmad	1,300	31.19	▼9.31
PAS	Abdul Rashid Su	992	23.80	▼20.50
Total valid votes		4,168	100.00	
Total rejected ballots		267		
Unreturned ballots		0		
Turnout		4,435	81.89	▼0.65
Registered electors		5,416		
Majority		576	13.82	▲10.03
BN hold		Swing		

Terengganu state election, 1974: Kuala Brang
Party	Candidate	Votes	%
BN	Abdul Rashid Su	1,600	44.30
Parti Sosialis Rakyat Malaysia	Bakar Ahmad	1,463	40.50
Independent	Tuan Hadi Syed Sanggar	437	12.10
Independent	Ghani Seman	112	3.10
Total valid votes		3,612	100.00
Total rejected ballots		269	
Unreturned ballots		0	
Turnout		3,881	82.54
Registered electors		4,702	
Majority		137	3.79
This was a new constituency created.
