= Jailani Johari =

Malaysian politician

Yang Hormat Dato' Sri Jailani Johari SSAP DSMZ DIMP
- جايلاني جوهري
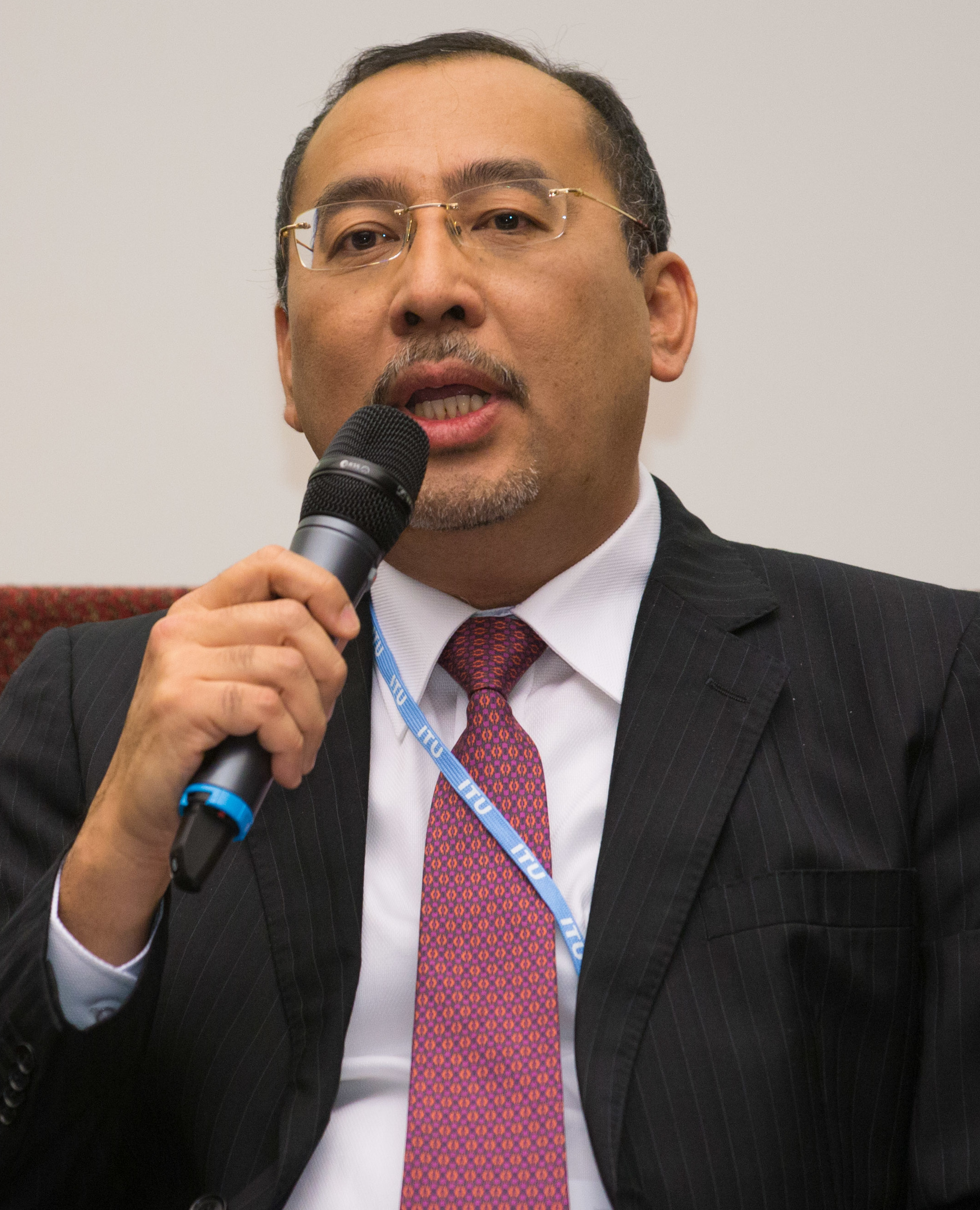

Ministerial roles
- 2013-2018: Deputy Minister of Communication and Multimedia

Faction represented in Dewan Rakyat
- 2013-2018: Barisan Nasional

Personal details
- Born: Jailani Johari; 2 August 1965 (age 61) Ajil, Terengganu
- Party: United Malays National Organisation (UMNO)
- Other political affiliations: Barisan Nasional (BN); Perikatan Nasional (PN); Muafakat Nasional (MN)
- Spouse: Siti Nurbiha Mohd Bisharuddin
- Education: Universiti Malaya
- Occupation: Politician, Lawyer

Jailani bin Johari (Jawi: جايلاني جوهري; born 2 August 1965) is a Malaysian politician who previously served as Deputy Minister of Communication and Multimedia under the Barisan Nasional administration of then Prime Minister, Najib Razak from 2013 to 2018. He is a member of the United Malays National Organisation (UMNO), a component party of the BN administration.

== Personal life ==
Jailani Johari was born in Ajil, Terengganu. He is a graduate of University Malaya. He was admitted as an Advocate & Solicitor of the High Court Malaya in 1989. His career at the Malaysian Bar spans more than 25 years. His practice covers a wide breadth of areas includes Criminal & Civil Litigation, Commercial and Corporate Law.

He is married to Datin Sri Siti Nurbiha Mohd Bisharuddin and has been blessed with 5 children namely Amir Haziq, Arif Danial, Adriana Batrisyia, Amira Sofea and Adiba Marsya.

== Political career ==
Jailani has served as a Member of Parliament Malaysia from 2013 to 2018. He held several senior positions throughout his career. He has in recent times paved his way into Commissions namely Commodity, Securities and Communications and Multimedia. He notched up everything under his belt prior to being appointed as the Deputy Minister of Ministry of Communication and Multimedia from 2013 to 2018. He has vast experience in Cyber Law and as a Lawmaker during his term of service with Ministry of Communication and Multimedia and Communications and Multimedia Commission (MCMC).

He headed delegation for UPU Congress in Doha under the theme “New World, New Strategy“ in 2012. He was elected as the member of the Postal Operations Council (POC) in Bern from 2013 to 2016 consisting of 40 countries. He was appointed as the Chairman of Communications and Media Relations Committee (JCOMM) by Malaysian Government to manage the coordination and communication for the MH370 and later MH17 tragedies. He was also a committee member of MH370 High-Level Technical Task Force (HLTTF) involved in search operation coordinated by the Australian Maritime Safety Authority (AMSA) moved to an underwater phase led by the Joint Agency Coordination Centre (JACC) and the Australian Transport Safety Bureau (ATSB).

== Election results ==
Parliament of Malaysia
Year	Constituency	Candidate	Votes	Pct	Opponent(s)	Votes	Pct	Ballots cast	Majority	Turnout
2013	P038 Hulu Terengganu	Jailani Johari (UMNO)	31,940	57.38%	Kamaruzaman Abdullah (PAS)	23,727	42.62%	56,634	8,213	89.13%

Terengganu State Legislative Assembly
Year	Constituency	Candidate	Votes	Pct	Opponent(s)	Votes	Pct	Ballots cast	Majority	Turnout
2023	N24 Ajil	Jailani Johari (UMNO)	6,104	33.06%	Maliaman Kassim (PAS)	12,362	66.94%	18,598	6,258	74.62%

== Honours ==
- Pahang
  - Knight Grand Companion of the Order of Sultan Ahmad Shah of Pahang (SSAP) – Dato' Sri (2017)
  - Knight Companion of the Order of the Crown of Pahang (DIMP) – Dato' (2007)
- Terengganu
  - Knight Companion of the Order of Sultan Mizan Zainal Abidin of Terengganu (DSMZ) – Dato' (2011)

== See also ==
- Hulu Terengganu (federal constituency)
