= Roslee Daud =

Malaysian politician

Haji Roslee Daud
- رسلي بن داود

Exco roles (Terengganu)
- 2013–2016: Chairman of the Entrepreneurship, Rural Development, Consumerism and Co-operatives
- 2016–2018: Chairman of the Health, Woman Development, Family and Community

Faction represented in Terengganu State Legislative Assembly
- 2013–2023: Barisan Nasional

Personal details
- Born: Roslee bin Daud Terengganu, Malaysia
- Citizenship: Malaysian
- Party: United Malays National Organisation (UMNO)
- Other political affiliations: Barisan Nasional (BN)
- Occupation: Politician

Roslee bin Daud is a Malaysian politician who served as Member of the Terengganu State Executive Council (EXCO) in the Barisan Nasional (BN) state administration under former Menteris Besar Ahmad Said and Ahmad Razif Abdul Rahman from May 2013 to the collapse of the BN state administration in May 2018 and Member of the Terengganu State Legislative Assembly (MLA) for Bukit Besi from May 2013 to August 2023. He is a member of the United Malays National Organisation (UMNO), a component party of the BN coalition.

== Election results ==
Terengganu State Legislative Assembly
Year	Constituency	Candidate	Votes	Pct	Opponent(s)	Votes	Pct	Ballots cast	Majority	Turnout
2013	N25 Bukit Besi	Roslee Daud (UMNO)	6,966	60.97%	Roslan Ismail (PAS)	4,408	38.57%	11,647	2,558	87.30%
2013	N25 Bukit Besi	Roslee Daud (UMNO)	6,966	60.97%	Mohd Shamsul Mat Amin (PKR)	52	0.46%	11,647	2,558	87.30%
2018	N25 Bukit Besi	Roslee Daud (UMNO)	5,770	48.16%	Ghazali Sulaiman (PAS)	5,724	47.78%	12,239	46	84.40%
2018	N25 Bukit Besi	Roslee Daud (UMNO)	5,770	48.16%	Mohamad Arif Arifin (PPBM)	487	4.06%	12,239	46	84.40%
