= Dungun (federal constituency) =

Federal constituency in Malaysia

Dungun (P039)
Terengganu constituency

Federal constituency
- Legislature: Dewan Rakyat
- MP: Wan Hassan Mohd Ramli; PN
- Constituency created: 1958
- First contested: 1959
- Last contested: 2022

Demographics
- Population (2020): 156,225
- Electors (2023): 116,634
- Area (km²): 2,687
- Pop. density (per km²): 58.1

Dungun is a federal constituency in Dungun District, Terengganu, Malaysia, that has been represented in the Dewan Rakyat since 1959.

The federal constituency was created in the 1958 redistribution and is mandated to return a single member to the Dewan Rakyat under the first past the post voting system.

== Demographics ==
https://live.chinapress.com.my/ge15/parliament/TERENGGANU

Ethnic breakdown of Dungun's electorate as of 2022
1. Malay (96.4%)
2. Chinese (3.20%)
3. Indian (0.20%)
4. Other ethnicities (0.20%)
Age breakdown of Dungun's electorate as of 2022
1. 18-20 (7.53%)
2. 21-29 (24.5%)
3. 30-39 (25.1%)
4. 40-49 (17.4%)
5. 50-59 (12.6%)
6. 60-69 (8.65%)
7. 70-79 (3.39%)
8. 80-89 (0.79%)
9. above 90 (0.17%)
Gender breakdown of Dungun's electorate as of 2022
1. Male (50.6%)
2. Female (49.4%)

== History ==
=== Polling districts ===
According to the federal gazette issued on 18 July 2023, the Dungun constituency is divided into 49 polling districts.

State constituency	Polling district	Code	Location
Bukit Besi (N25)	FELDA Jerangau	039/25/01	SK LKTP Jerangau
Bukit Besi (N25)	Nerang	039/25/02	SMK Jerangau
Bukit Besi (N25)	Tepus	039/25/03	SK Tepus
Bukit Besi (N25)	Dendang	039/25/04	SK Dendang
Bukit Besi (N25)	Bukit Besi	039/25/05	SK Bukit Besi
Bukit Besi (N25)	Al-Muktafi Billah Shah	039/25/06	SMK Durian Mas
Bukit Besi (N25)	Kuala Jengai	039/25/07	SK Kuala Jengal
Bukit Besi (N25)	Pasir Raja	039/25/08	SK Pasir Raja
Bukit Besi (N25)	Shukor	039/25/09	SK Kampung Shukor
Bukit Besi (N25)	Jongok Batu	039/25/10	SK Jongok Batu
Bukit Besi (N25)	Lintang	039/25/11	SK Lintang
Bukit Besi (N25)	Minda	039/25/12	SK Minda Talong
Rantau Abang (N26)	Pinang	039/26/01	SK Kampung Wa
Rantau Abang (N26)	Padang Pulut	039/26/02	SK Padang Pulut
Rantau Abang (N26)	Delung	039/26/03	SK Delong
Rantau Abang (N26)	Kuala Abang	039/26/04	SK Kampung Baru Kuala Abang
Rantau Abang (N26)	Seberang Pintasan	039/26/05	SK Seberang Dungun
Rantau Abang (N26)	Pulau Serai	039/26/06	SMK Pulau Serai; SK Pulau Serai
Rantau Abang (N26)	Tok Kah	039/26/07	SK Tok Kah
Rantau Abang (N26)	Che Lijah	039/26/08	SK Tanjung Pati
Rantau Abang (N26)	Gong Pasir	039/26/09	SK Gong Pasir
Rantau Abang (N26)	Serdang	039/26/10	SK Serdang
Rantau Abang (N26)	Balai Besar	039/26/11	SK Balai Besar
Rantau Abang (N26)	Taman Permit Indah	039/26/12	SMK Tengku Intan Zaharah
Sura (N27)	Sungai Penaga	039/27/01	SJK (C) Kwang Hwa
Sura (N27)	Sungai Buaya	039/27/02	SMA Sultan Ismail
Sura (N27)	Nibung	039/27/03	SMA Sultan Ismail
Sura (N27)	Bukit Catak	039/27/04	SMK Seri Dungun
Sura (N27)	Alur Tembesu	039/27/05	SK Sultan Omar
Sura (N27)	Kampung Molek	039/27/06	SK Kuala Dungun
Sura (N27)	Tanah Lot	039/27/07	SK Bandar Dungun
Sura (N27)	Teluk Lipat	039/27/08	SMK Sultan Omar
Sura (N27)	Sura Gate	039/27/09	SK Batu 48
Sura (N27)	Sura Utara	039/27/10	SM Imtiaz Yayasan Terengganu Dungun
Sura (N27)	Padang Jambu	039/27/11	SK Pusat Dungun
Sura (N27)	Sura Tengah	039/27/12	SMK Sura; SK Sura
Paka (N28)	Kampung Baru Batu Lima	039/28/01	SJK (C) Sin Chone
Paka (N28)	Durian Metangau	039/28/02	SK Durian Metangau
Paka (N28)	Kampung Nyiur	039/28/03	SK Kampung Nyior
Paka (N28)	Tebing Tembah	039/28/04	SK Tebing Tembah
Paka (N28)	Kampung Masjid	039/28/05	SK Paka
Paka (N28)	Limbung	039/28/06	SMK Paka
Paka (N28)	Cacar	039/28/07	SK Seri Paka
Paka (N28)	FELDA Kertih 2	039/28/08	SMK Seri Rasau
Paka (N28)	FELDA Kertih 1	039/28/09	SK Ketengah Jaya II
Paka (N28)	Santung	039/28/10	SK Santong
Paka (N28)	FELDA Kertih 4	039/28/11	SMK Ketengah Jaya
Paka (N28)	Cacar Baru	039/28/12	SK Paka II
Paka (N28)	FELDA Kertih 3	039/28/13	SK FELDA Seri Rasau

=== Representation history ===
Members of Parliament for Dungun
Parliament	No	Years	Member	Party	Vote Share
Constituency created from Trengganu Selatan
Parliament of the Federation of Malaya
1st	P028	1959–1963	Che Khadijah Mohd Sidik (چي خادجه محمد صدق)	PMIP	6,249; 56.80%
Parliament of Malaysia
1st	P028	1963–1964	Che Khadijah Mohd Sidik (چي خادجه محمد صدق)	PMIP	6,249; 56.80%
2nd	P028	1964–1969	Suleiman Ali (سوليايمان علي)	Alliance (UMNO)	7,483; 50.98%
		1969–1971	Parliament was suspended		
3rd	P028	1971–1973	Abdul Wahab Yunus (عبدالوهاب يونس)	PMIP	10,051; 55.57%
3rd	P028	1973–1974	Abdul Wahab Yunus (عبدالوهاب يونس)	BN (PMIP)	10,051; 55.57%
4th	P033	1974–1978	Abdul Wahab Yunus (عبدالوهاب يونس)	BN (PAS)	11,815; 73.25%
5th	P033	1978–1982	Awang Abdul Jabar (اوڠ عبدالجبار)	BN (UMNO)	10,571; 55.93%
6th	P033	1982–1986	Awang Abdul Jabar (اوڠ عبدالجبار)	BN (UMNO)	13,447; 56.13%
7th	P036	1986–1990	Awang Abdul Jabar (اوڠ عبدالجبار)	BN (UMNO)	16,368; 61.49%
8th	P036	1990–1995	Awang Abdul Jabar (اوڠ عبدالجبار)	BN (UMNO)	18,593; 55.62%
9th	P039	1995–1999	Mokhtaruddin Wan Yusof (مختارالدين وان يوسف)	BN (UMNO)	17,004; 51.71%
10th	P039	1999–2004	Mustafa Ali (مصطفى علي)	BA (PAS)	22,248; 61.16%
11th	P039	2004–2008	Rosli Mat Hassan (روسلي مت حسن)	BN (UMNO)	26,398; 55.11%
12th	P039	2008–2013	Matulidi Jusoh (ماتريدي جوسوه)	BN (UMNO)	29,264; 54.66%
13th	P039	2013–2016	Wan Hassan Mohd Ramli (وان حسن محمد راملي)	PR (PAS)	35,348; 52.65%
13th	P039	2016–2018	Wan Hassan Mohd Ramli (وان حسن محمد راملي)	GS (PAS)	35,348; 52.65%
14th	P039	2018–2020	Wan Hassan Mohd Ramli (وان حسن محمد راملي)	GS (PAS)	40,850; 54.17%
14th	P039	2020–2022	Wan Hassan Mohd Ramli (وان حسن محمد راملي)	PN (PAS)	40,850; 54.17%
15th	P039	2022–present	Wan Hassan Mohd Ramli (وان حسن محمد راملي)	PN (PAS)	59,720; 65.43%

=== State constituency ===
Parliamentary constituency	State constituency						
Parliamentary constituency	1954–1959*	1959–1974	1974–1986	1986–1995	1995–2004	2004–2018	2018–present
Dungun					Bukit Besi		
Dungun			Jerangau				
Dungun		Marang					
Dungun				Mercang			
Dungun			Merchang				
Dungun				Paka			
Dungun					Rantau Abang		
Dungun		Sura					
Dungun		Ulu Dungun					

=== Historical boundaries ===
State Constituency	Area					
State Constituency	1959	1974	1984	1994	2003	2018
Bukit Besi				Al-Muktafi Billah Shah; Bukit Besi; FELDA Jerangau; Kampung Dendang; Kampung Pinang Baru		Al-Muktafi Billah Shah; Bukit Besi; FELDA Jerangau; Kampung Dendang; Kampung Panchur
Jerangau		Bukit Besi; FELDA Jerangau; Jerangau; Kampung Bukit Merah; Kampung Delong	Bukit Besi; FELDA Jerangau; Jerangau; Kampung Bukit Merah; Kampung Kuala Jengai			
Marang	Kampung Bukit Gasing; Kampung Kelulut; Marang; Merchang; Pulau Kerengga	Kampung Bukit Gasing; Kampung Pengkalan Kuin; Kampung Rhu Dua; Kampung Sentol Patah; Marang				
Mercang		Kampung Kelulut; Kampung Serating; Mercang; Pulau Kerengga; Rantau Abang				
Paka			Al-Muktafi Billah Shah; Kampung Durian Mentagau; Paka; Sura Tengah; Taman Murni Perdana	Kampung Batu Enam; Kampung Durian Mentagau; Paka; Sura Tengah; Taman Murni Perdana		Kampung Batu Enam; Kampung Durian Mentagau; Kampung Telaga Mas; Paka; Taman Murni Perdana
Rantau Abang				Gong Pasir; Kampung Pinang; Pulau Serai; Rantau Abang; Taman Permit Indah		Gong Pasir; Kuala Abang; Pulau Serai; Rantau Abang; Taman Permit Indah
Sura	Kampung Batu Tiong; Kampung Kereta Pulas; Kuala Abang; Tanjung Jara; Telok Bidara	Alur Tembesu; Bukit Tebuk; Kampung Che Lijah; Kuala Dungun; Taman Bestari	Alur Tembesu; Bukit Tebuk; Kuala Dungun; Sura; Taman Bestari	Alur Tembesu; Bukit Tebuk; Kampung Teluk Lipat; Kuala Dungun; Sura		Bukit Tebuk; Kampung Teluk Lipat; Kuala Dungun; Kampung Sura Tengah; Sura
Ulu Dungun	Bukit Besi; FELDA Jerangau; Jerangau; Kampung Bukit Merah; Kampung Delong					

=== Current state assembly members ===
No.	State Constituency	Member	Coalition (Party)
N25	Bukit Besi	Ghazali Sulaiman	PN (PAS)
N26	Rantau Abang	Mohd Fadhli Rahmi Zulkifli	PN (PAS)
N27	Sura	Tengku Muhammad Fakhruddin	PN (PAS)
N28	Paka	Satiful Bahri Mamat	PN (PAS)

=== Local governments & postcodes ===
No.	State Constituency	Local Government	Postcode
N25	Bukit Besi	Dungun Municipal Council	23000, 23050 Dungun; 23100 Paka; 23200 Bukit Besi; 23300 Ketengah Jaya; 23400 Al Muktafi Billah Shah; 24000 Cukai
N26	Rantau Abang	Dungun Municipal Council	23000, 23050 Dungun; 23100 Paka; 23200 Bukit Besi; 23300 Ketengah Jaya; 23400 Al Muktafi Billah Shah; 24000 Cukai
N27	Sura	Dungun Municipal Council	23000, 23050 Dungun; 23100 Paka; 23200 Bukit Besi; 23300 Ketengah Jaya; 23400 Al Muktafi Billah Shah; 24000 Cukai
N28	Paka	Dungun Municipal Council	23000, 23050 Dungun; 23100 Paka; 23200 Bukit Besi; 23300 Ketengah Jaya; 23400 Al Muktafi Billah Shah; 24000 Cukai

== Election results ==
Malaysian general election, 2022
Party	Candidate	Votes	%	∆%
PAS	Wan Hassan Mohd Ramli	59,720	65.43	▲11.26
BN	Norhisham Johari	25,615	28.07	▼8.70
PH	Mohasdjone @ Mohd Johari Mohamad	5,307	5.81	▲5.81
PEJUANG	Nur Aishah Hasan	322	0.35	▲0.35
Independent	Ghazali Ismail	305	0.33	▲0.33
Total valid votes		91,269	100.00	
Total rejected ballots		736		
Unreturned ballots		123		
Turnout		92,128	78.98	▼5.77
Registered electors		115,559		
Majority		34,105	37.36	▲19.96
PAS hold		Swing		
Source(s) https://lom.agc.gov.my/ilims/upload/portal/akta/outputp/1753269/PUB608%20PARLIMEN%20TERENGGANU.pdf

Malaysian general election, 2018
Party	Candidate	Votes	%	∆%
PAS	Wan Hassan Mohd Ramli	40,850	54.17	▲1.52
BN	Din Adam	27,731	36.77	▼10.01
PKR	Abd Rahman Yusof	6,833	9.06	▲9.06
Total valid votes		75,414	100.00	
Total rejected ballots		886		
Unreturned ballots		406		
Turnout		76,706	84.75	▼2.50
Registered electors		90,506		
Majority		13,119	17.40	▲11.53
PAS hold		Swing		
Source(s) "His Majesty's Government Gazette - Notice of Contested Election, Parliament for the State of Terengganu [P.U. (B) 235/2018]" (PDF). Attorney General's Chambers of Malaysia. 3 May 2018. "Federal Government Gazette - Results of Contested Election and Statements of the Poll after the Official Addition of Votes, Parliamentary Constituencies for the State of Terengganu [P.U. (B) 309/2018]" (PDF). Attorney General's Chambers of Malaysia. 28 May 2018.

Malaysian general election, 2013
Party	Candidate	Votes	%	∆%
PAS	Wan Hassan Mohd Ramli	35,348	52.65	▲52.65
BN	Rosli Mat Hassan	31,406	46.78	▼7.88
Independent	Mazlan Harun	384	0.57	▲0.57
Total valid votes		67,138	100.00	
Total rejected ballots		909		
Unreturned ballots		157		
Turnout		68,204	87.25	▲3.27
Registered electors		78,174		
Majority		3,942	5.87	▼3.45
PAS gain from BN		Swing		?
Source(s) "Federal Government Gazette - Notice of Contested Election, Parliament for the State of Terengganu [P.U. (B) 172/2013]" (PDF). Attorney General's Chambers of Malaysia. 26 April 2013. "Federal Government Gazette - Results of Contested Election and Statements of the Poll after the Official Addition of Votes, Parliamentary Constituencies for the State of Terengganu [P.U. (B) 213/2013]" (PDF). Attorney General's Chambers of Malaysia. 22 May 2013.

Malaysian general election, 2008
Party	Candidate	Votes	%	∆%
BN	Matulidi Jusoh	29,264	54.66	▼0.45
PKR	Shamsul Iskandar @ Yusre Mohd Akin	24,270	45.34	▲45.34
Total valid votes		53,534	100.00	
Total rejected ballots		930		
Unreturned ballots		0		
Turnout		54,464	83.98	▼6.14
Registered electors		64,851		
Majority		4,994	9.32	▼0.90
BN hold		Swing		

Malaysian general election, 2004
Party	Candidate	Votes	%	∆%
BN	Rosli Mat Hassan	26,398	55.11	▲16.27
PAS	Mustafa @ Hassan Ali	21,502	44.89	▼16.27
Total valid votes		47,900	100.00	
Total rejected ballots		708		
Unreturned ballots		1,598		
Turnout		50,206	90.12	▲8.72
Registered electors		55,710		
Majority		4,896	10.22	▼12.10
BN gain from PAS		Swing		?

Malaysian general election, 1999
Party	Candidate	Votes	%	∆%
PAS	Mustafa @ Hassan Ali	22,248	61.16	▲12.87
BN	Ibrahim Awang	14,130	38.84	▼12.87
Total valid votes		36,378	100.00	
Total rejected ballots		497		
Unreturned ballots		0		
Turnout		36,875	81.40	▲1.28
Registered electors		45,300		
Majority		8,118	22.32	▲18.90
PAS gain from BN		Swing		?

Malaysian general election, 1995
Party	Candidate	Votes	%	∆%
BN	Mokhtaruddin Wan Yusof	17,004	51.71	▼3.91
PAS	Mustafa @ Hassan Ali	15,882	48.29	▲3.91
Total valid votes		32,886	100.00	
Total rejected ballots		757		
Unreturned ballots		77		
Turnout		33,720	80.12	▼1.00
Registered electors		42,086		
Majority		1,122	3.42	▼7.82
BN hold		Swing		

Malaysian general election, 1990
Party	Candidate	Votes	%	∆%
BN	Awang Abdul Jabar	18,593	55.62	▼5.87
PAS	Mustafa @ Hassan Ali	14,834	44.38	▲5.87
Total valid votes		33,427	100.00	
Total rejected ballots		939		
Unreturned ballots		0		
Turnout		34,366	81.12	▲3.79
Registered electors		42,362		
Majority		3,759	11.24	▼11.74
BN hold		Swing		

Malaysian general election, 1986
Party	Candidate	Votes	%	∆%
BN	Awang Abdul Jabar	16,368	61.49	▲5.36
PAS	Ramli Jusoh	10,252	38.51	▼3.95
Total valid votes		26,620	100.00	
Total rejected ballots		771		
Unreturned ballots		0		
Turnout		27,391	77.33	▼2.47
Registered electors		35,422		
Majority		6,116	22.98	▲9.31
BN hold		Swing		

Malaysian general election, 1982
Party	Candidate	Votes	%	∆%
BN	Awang Abdul Jabar	13,447	56.13	▲0.20
PAS	Abdul Hadi Awang	10,172	42.46	▼1.61
Parti Rakyat Malaysia	Abdul Hamid Embong	337	1.41	▲1.41
Total valid votes		23,956	100.00	
Total rejected ballots		833		
Unreturned ballots		0		
Turnout		24,789	79.80	▲5.30
Registered electors		31,064		
Majority		3,275	13.67	▲1.81
BN hold		Swing		

Malaysian general election, 1978
Party	Candidate	Votes	%	∆%
BN	Awang Abdul Jabar	10,571	55.93	▼17.32
PAS	Abdul Wahab Yunus	8,331	44.07	▲44.07
Total valid votes		18,902	100.00	
Total rejected ballots		993		
Unreturned ballots		0		
Turnout		19,895	74.50	▲3.58
Registered electors		26,704		
Majority		2,240	11.86	▼34.64
BN hold		Swing		

Malaysian general election, 1974
Party	Candidate	Votes	%	∆%
BN	Abdul Wahab Yunus	11815	73.25	▲73.25
Parti Sosialis Rakyat Malaysia	Kampo Radjo	4,314	26.75	▲26.75
Total valid votes		16,129	100.00	
Total rejected ballots		1346		
Unreturned ballots		0		
Turnout		17,475	70.92	▼2.63
Registered electors		25,202		
Majority		7,501	46.50	▲35.36
BN gain from PMIP		Swing		?
Source(s) Maya Liza Mohamed (2004). Almanak Keputusan Pilihan Raya Umum: Parlimen & Dewan Undangan Negeri 1959-1999 (in Malay). Shah Alam: Anzagain Sdn Bhd. p. 254. ISBN 978-983-03715-2-8.

Malaysian general election, 1969
Party	Candidate	Votes	%	∆%
PMIP	Abdul Wahab Yunus	10,051	55.57	▲15.09
Alliance	Mustapha Abdul Majeed	8,036	44.43	▼6.55
Total valid votes		18,087	100.00	
Total rejected ballots		984		
Unreturned ballots		0		
Turnout		19,071	73.55	▲1.15
Registered electors		25,930		
Majority		2,015	11.14	▲0.64
PMIP gain from Alliance		Swing		?

Malaysian general election, 1964
Party	Candidate	Votes	%	∆%
Alliance	Suleiman Ali	7,483	50.98	▲13.19
PMIP	Ngah Mohamad	5,941	40.48	▼16.32
Socialist Front	Harun Yusoff	691	4.71	▼0.70
National Party	Attan Naib	562	3.83	▲3.83
Total valid votes		14,677	100.00	
Total rejected ballots		613		
Unreturned ballots		0		
Turnout		15,290	72.40	▲1.95
Registered electors		21,119		
Majority		1,542	10.50	▼8.51
Alliance gain from PMIP		Swing		?

Malayan general election, 1959
Party	Candidate	Votes	%
PMIP	Che Khadijah Mohd Sidik	6,249	56.80
Alliance	Mohamed Adib Omar	4,158	37.79
Socialist Front	Wan Salleh Abdul Kadir	595	5.41
Total valid votes		11,002	100.00
Total rejected ballots		100	
Unreturned ballots		0	
Turnout		11,102	70.45
Registered electors		15,759	
Majority		2,091	19.01
This was a new constituency created.
