= M. Shukrimun Shamsudin =

Malaysian politician (died 2024)

Member of the Malaysian Parliament for Kuala Nerus
- In office 29 November 1999 – 21 March 2004
- Preceded by: Abdul Rahin Mohd Said (BN–UMNO)
- Succeeded by: Che Azmi Abd Rahman (BN–UMNO)
- Majority: 7,078 (1999)

Personal details
- Died: 2 March 2024
- Party: Malaysian Islamic Party (PAS)
- Other political affiliations: Barisan Alternatif (BA) (1999–2004); Pakatan Rakyat (PR) (2008–2015); Gagasan Sejahtera (GS) (2016–2020); Perikatan Nasional (PN) (2020–2024)

M. Shukrimun bin Shamsudin (died 2 March 2024) was a Malaysian politician. A member of the Dewan Rakyat, he served in the Parliament of Malaysia from 1999 to 2004.

Shamsudin died on 2 March 2024.

== Election results ==
Parliament of Malaysia
Year	Constituency	Candidate	Votes	Pct	Opponent(s)	Votes	Pct	Ballots cast	Majority	Turnout
1999	P035 Kuala Nerus	M. Shukrimun Shamsudin (PAS)	21,608	59.79%	Abdul Rahin Mohd Said (UMNO)	14,530	40.21%	37,289	7,078	83.69%
2004	P035 Kuala Nerus	M. Shukrimun Shamsudin (PAS)	20,798	45.52%	Che Azmi Abd Rahman (UMNO)	24,895	54.48%	46,546	4,097	88.71%
2004	P035 Kuala Nerus	M. Shukrimun Shamsudin (PAS)	25,098	48.70%	Mohd Nasir Ibrahim Fikri (UMNO)	26,439	51.30%	52,539	1,341	85.83%

== Honours ==
- Terengganu
  - Member of the Order of the Crown of Terengganu (AMT) (2023)
