= Kuala Nerus (federal constituency) =

Federal constituency of Terengganu, Malaysia

Kuala Nerus (P035)
Terengganu constituency

Federal constituency
- Legislature: Dewan Rakyat
- MP: Alias Razak; PN
- Constituency created: 1974
- First contested: 1974
- Last contested: 2022

Demographics
- Population (2020): 144,220
- Electors (2023): 107,081
- Area (km²): 331
- Pop. density (per km²): 435.7

Kuala Nerus is a federal constituency in Kuala Nerus District, Terengganu, Malaysia, that has been represented in the Dewan Rakyat since 1974.

The federal constituency was created in the 1974 redistribution and is mandated to return a single member to the Dewan Rakyat under the first past the post voting system.

== Demographics ==
Ethnic breakdown of Kuala Nerus's electorate as of 2022
1. Malay (98.7%)
2. Chinese (1.10%)
3. Other ethnicities (0.20%)
4. Indian (0.10%)
Age breakdown of Kuala Nerus's electorate as of 2022
1. 18-20 (7.33%)
2. 21-29 (25.2%)
3. 30-39 (26.4%)
4. 40-49 (16.7%)
5. 50-59 (12.0%)
6. 60-69 (7.98%)
7. 70-79 (3.32%)
8. 80-89 (0.93%)
9. above 90 (0.12%)
Gender breakdown of Kuala Nerus's electorate as of 2022
1. Male (50.0%)
2. Female (50.0%)

== History ==
=== Polling districts ===
According to the federal gazette issued on 18 July 2023, the Kuala Nerus constituency is divided into 37 polling districts.

State constituency	Polling district	Code	Location
Tepuh (N09)	FELDA Belara	035/09/01	SK LKTP Belara
Tepuh (N09)	Gemuruh	035/09/02	SK Kampung Gemuroh
Tepuh (N09)	Bukit Guntung	035/09/03	SK Bukit Guntong
Tepuh (N09)	Tepuh	035/09/04	SK Bukit Nenas
Tepuh (N09)	Padang Air	035/09/05	SK Padang Air
Tepuh (N09)	Tok Jiring	035/09/06	SMA Dato' Haji Abbas
Tepuh (N09)	Padang Nanas	035/09/07	Dewan Sivik Padang Nenas
Tepuh (N09)	Taman Perumahan Gong Badak	035/09/08	SK Gong Badak
Tepuh (N09)	Lerek	035/09/09	SMK Bukit Guntong
Tepuh (N09)	Gong Datuk	035/09/10	SK Tanjung Gelam
Tepuh (N09)	Wakaf Tembesu	035/09/11	SMK Kompleks Gong Badak
Buluh Gading (N10)	Bukit Petiti	035/10/01	SK Bukit Petiti
Buluh Gading (N10)	Banggul Peradung	035/10/02	SK Banggol Peradong
Buluh Gading (N10)	Kebur Besar	035/10/03	SK Kabor Besar
Buluh Gading (N10)	Kebur Air	035/10/04	SK Kebor Ayer
Buluh Gading (N10)	Jeram	035/10/05	SMK Dato' Haji Mohd Said
Buluh Gading (N10)	Petai Bubus	035/10/06	SK Kampong Tengah; Kompleks Usahawan Terengganu
Buluh Gading (N10)	Teluk Pusu	035/10/07	SMK Haji Abdul Rahman Limbong
Buluh Gading (N10)	Tanjung Bunut	035/10/08	SK Telok Pusu
Buluh Gading (N10)	Kesum	035/10/09	SK Kesom
Buluh Gading (N10)	Buluh Gading	035/10/10	Dewan Sivik Buluh Gading
Seberang Takir (N11)	Tok Jembal	035/11/01	SK Tok Jembal
Seberang Takir (N11)	Bukit Tok Beng	035/11/02	SK Bukit Tok Beng
Seberang Takir (N11)	Kampung Batin	035/11/03	SK Kompleks Seberang Takir
Seberang Takir (N11)	Kampung Baru Seberang Takir	035/11/04	SMK Kompleks Seberang Takir
Seberang Takir (N11)	Seberang Takir Pantai	035/11/05	SK Seberang Takir
Seberang Takir (N11)	Teluk Ketapang	035/11/06	SK Teluk Ketapang
Seberang Takir (N11)	Telaga Daing	035/11/07	SMK Ibrahim Fikri
Seberang Takir (N11)	Telaga Batin	035/11/08	Kem Pengakap Tengku Muhammad Ismail
Seberang Takir (N11)	Kubang Badak	035/11/09	Dewan Serbaguna Tok Jemal
Bukit Tunggal (N12)	Batu Enam	035/12/01	SMK Kompleks Tembesu; SK Tok Jering
Bukit Tunggal (N12)	Pak Katak	035/12/02	Kolej Vokesional Wakaf Tembesu
Bukit Tunggal (N12)	Bukit Tumbuh	035/12/03	SK Bukit Tumbuh
Bukit Tunggal (N12)	Bukit Tunggal	035/12/04	SK Bukit Tunggal; Balai Raya Dan Futsal Seberang Baruh
Bukit Tunggal (N12)	Duyung	035/12/05	SK Duyong
Bukit Tunggal (N12)	Pulau Ketam	035/12/06	Dewan Sivik Pulau Duyong
Bukit Tunggal (N12)	Gong Kijang	035/12/07	SMK Bukit Tunggal

=== Representation history ===
Members of Parliament for Kuala Nerus
Parliament	No	Years	Member	Party	Vote Share
Constituency created from Kuala Trengganu Selatan and Trengganu Tengah
4th	P031	1974–1978	Nik Hassan Abdul Rahman (نئ حسّان عبدالرحمٰن)	BN (UMNO)	10,894; 59.22%
5th	P031	1978–1982	Nik Hassan Abdul Rahman (نئ حسّان عبدالرحمٰن)	BN (UMNO)	Uncontested
6th	P031	1982–1986	Ibrahim Azmi Hassan (إبراهيم عزمي حسّان)	BN (UMNO)	13,325; 51.25%
7th	P032	1986–1990	Ibrahim Azmi Hassan (إبراهيم عزمي حسّان)	BN (UMNO)	15,823; 64.98%
8th	P032	1990–1995	Abdul Rashid Muhammad (عبدالرشيد محمّد)	BN (UMNO)	17,366; 55.81%
9th	P035	1995–1999	Abdul Rahin Mohd Said (عبدالرهين محمّد سعيد)	BN (UMNO)	17,643; 53.35%
10th	P035	1999–2004	M. Shukrimum Shamsudin (م. شكريموم شمس الدين)	BA (PAS)	21,608; 59.79%
11th	P035	2004–2008	Che Azmi Abd Rahman (چئ عزمي عبدالرحمٰن)	BN (UMNO)	24,895; 54.48%
12th	P035	2008–2013	Mohd Nasir Ibrahim Fikri (محمّد ناصر إبراهيم فکري)	BN (UMNO)	26,439; 51.30%
13th	P035	2013–2016	Mohd Khairuddin Aman Razali (محمّد خيرالدين أمان غزالي)	PR (PAS)	33,861; 50.45%
13th	P035	2016–2018	Mohd Khairuddin Aman Razali (محمّد خيرالدين أمان غزالي)	GS (PAS)	33,861; 50.45%
14th	P035	2018–2020	Mohd Khairuddin Aman Razali (محمّد خيرالدين أمان غزالي)	GS (PAS)	37,974; 52.66%
14th	P035	2020–2022	Mohd Khairuddin Aman Razali (محمّد خيرالدين أمان غزالي)	PN (PAS)	37,974; 52.66%
14th	P035	2022	Mohd Khairuddin Aman Razali (محمّد خيرالدين أمان غزالي)	Independent	37,974; 52.66%
15th	P035	2022–present	Alias Razak (ألياس رزاق)	PN (PAS)	56,697; 64.70%

=== State constituency ===
Parliamentary constituency	State constituency						
Parliamentary constituency	1954–1959*	1959–1974	1974–1986	1986–1995	1995–2004	2004–2018	2018–present
Kuala Nerus			Bukit Payong				
Kuala Nerus			Bukit Tunggal				
Kuala Nerus							Buluh Gading
Kuala Nerus			Jeram				
Kuala Nerus			Manir				
Kuala Nerus				Seberang Takir			
Kuala Nerus				Teluk Pasu			
Kuala Nerus				Tepuh			

=== Historical boundaries ===
State Constituency	Area				
State Constituency	1974	1984	1994	2003	2018
Bukit Payong	Bukit Payong; Kampung Rawai; Kampung Telaga Mengkudu; Kampung Wakaf Dua; Serada				
Bukit Tunggal	Bukit Tunggal; Kampung Banggol Donas; Kampung Batin; Kampung Bukit Tok Ris; Seberang Takir	Bukit Tunggal; Kampung Bukit Serdang; Kampung Bukit Tok Ris; Pulau Duyong; Taman Desa Tanjung Permai	Bukit Tunggal; Kampung Batin; Kampung Bukit Tok Ris; Pulau Duyong; Taman Desa Tanjung Permai	Bukit Tunggal; Kampung Batu Enam; Kampung Bukit Tok Ris; Pulau Duyong; Taman Desa Tanjung Permai	
Buluh Gading					Buluh Gading; Kampung Banggol Tuan Muda; Kampung Kebor Besar; Kampung Kesom; Kampung Tetambah
Jeram	Jeram; Kampung Batu Enam; Kampung Kebor Besar; Kampung Sungai Ikan; Pulai Baharu				
Manir	Durian Burung; Kampung Batu Hampar; Manir; Pulau Rusa; Teluk Menara				
Seberang Takir		Kampung Kubang Badak; Kampung Tanjung Angsa; Kampung Tok Beng; Seberang Takir; Teluk Ketapang			
Teluk Pasu		Buluh Gading; Kampung Banggol Tuan Muda; Kampung Kebor Besar; Kampung Kesom; Kampung Tetambah			
Tepuh		FELDA Belara; Gemuruh; Gong Badak; Ladang Tayor; Wakaf Tembesu	FELDA Belara; Gemuruh; Gong Badak; Tepuh; Wakaf Tembesu		

=== Current state assembly members ===
No.	State Constituency	Member	Coalition (Party)
N09	Tepuh	Hishamuddin Abdul Karim	PN (PAS)
N10	Buluh Gading	Ridzuan Hashim	PN (PAS)
N11	Seberang Takir	Khazan Che Mat	PN (BERSATU)
N12	Bukit Tunggal	Zaharudin Zahid	PN (PAS)

=== Local governments & postcodes ===
No.	State Constituency	Local Government	Postcode
N09	Tepuh	Kuala Terengganu City Council	20520, 21010, 21030, 21060, 21200, 21300 Kuala Terengganu
N10	Buluh Gading	Kuala Terengganu City Council	20520, 21010, 21030, 21060, 21200, 21300 Kuala Terengganu
N11	Seberang Takir	Kuala Terengganu City Council	20520, 21010, 21030, 21060, 21200, 21300 Kuala Terengganu
N12	Bukit Tunggal	Kuala Terengganu City Council	20520, 21010, 21030, 21060, 21200, 21300 Kuala Terengganu

== Election results ==
Malaysian general election, 2022
Party	Candidate	Votes	%	∆%
PAS	Alias Razak	56,697	64.70	▲10.04
BN	Mohd Khairuddin Aman Razali	26,932	30.73	▼10.22
PH	Suhaimi Hashim	3,708	4.23	▲4.23
PEJUANG	Azahar Wahid	291	0.33	▲0.33
Total valid votes		87,628	100.00	
Total rejected ballots		736		
Unreturned ballots		229		
Turnout		88,593	82.71	▼4.80
Registered electors		105,952		
Majority		29,765	33.97	▲22.26
PAS hold		Swing		
Source(s) https://lom.agc.gov.my/ilims/upload/portal/akta/outputp/1753269/PUB608%20PARLIMEN%20TERENGGANU.pdf

Malaysian general election, 2018
Party	Candidate	Votes	%	∆%
PAS	Mohd Khairuddin Aman Razali	37,974	52.66	▲2.21
BN	Tengku Asmadi Tengku Mohamad	29,527	40.95	▼8.60
PKR	Abdullah Mohamed	4,604	6.39	▲6.39
Total valid votes		72,105	100.00	
Total rejected ballots		727		
Unreturned ballots		379		
Turnout		73,211	87.51	▼1.73
Registered electors		83,663		
Majority		8,447	11.71	▲10.81
PAS hold		Swing		
Source(s) "His Majesty's Government Gazette - Notice of Contested Election, Parliament for the State of Terengganu [P.U. (B) 235/2018]" (PDF). Attorney General's Chambers of Malaysia. 3 May 2018. "Federal Government Gazette - Results of Contested Election and Statements of the Poll after the Official Addition of Votes, Parliamentary Constituencies for the State of Terengganu [P.U. (B) 309/2018]" (PDF). Attorney General's Chambers of Malaysia. 28 May 2018.

Malaysian general election, 2013
Party	Candidate	Votes	%	∆%
PAS	Mohd Khairuddin Aman Razali	33,861	50.45	▲1.75
BN	Mohd Nasir Ibrahim Fikri	33,251	49.55	▼1.75
Total valid votes		67,112	100.00	
Total rejected ballots		772		
Unreturned ballots		152		
Turnout		68,036	89.24	▲3.41
Registered electors		76,238		
Majority		610	0.90	▼1.70
PAS gain from BN		Swing		?
Source(s) "Federal Government Gazette - Notice of Contested Election, Parliament for the State of Terengganu [P.U. (B) 172/2013]" (PDF). Attorney General's Chambers of Malaysia. 26 April 2013. "Federal Government Gazette - Results of Contested Election and Statements of the Poll after the Official Addition of Votes, Parliamentary Constituencies for the State of Terengganu [P.U. (B) 213/2013]" (PDF). Attorney General's Chambers of Malaysia. 22 May 2013.

Malaysian general election, 2008
Party	Candidate	Votes	%	∆%
BN	Mohd Nasir Ibrahim Fikri	26,439	51.30	▼3.18
PAS	M. Shukrimum Shamsudin	25,098	48.70	▲3.18
Total valid votes		51,537	100.00	
Total rejected ballots		713		
Unreturned ballots		289		
Turnout		52,539	85.83	▼2.88
Registered electors		61,214		
Majority		1,341	2.60	▼6.36
BN hold		Swing		

Malaysian general election, 2004
Party	Candidate	Votes	%	∆%
BN	Che Azmi Abd Rahman	24,895	54.48	▲14.27
PAS	M. Shukrimum Shamsudin	20,798	45.52	▼14.27
Total valid votes		45,693	100.00	
Total rejected ballots		713		
Unreturned ballots		140		
Turnout		46,546	88.71	▲5.02
Registered electors		52,469		
Majority		4,097	8.96	▼10.62
BN gain from PAS		Swing		?

Malaysian general election, 1999
Party	Candidate	Votes	%	∆%
PAS	M. Shukrimum Shamsudin	21,608	59.79	▲59.79
BN	Abdul Rahin Mohd Said	14,530	40.21	▼13.14
Total valid votes		36,138	100.00	
Total rejected ballots		687		
Unreturned ballots		464		
Turnout		37,289	83.69	▲1.07
Registered electors		44,556		
Majority		7,078	19.58	▲12.88
PAS gain from BN		Swing		?

Malaysian general election, 1995
Party	Candidate	Votes	%	∆%
BN	Abdul Rahin Mohd Said	17,643	53.35	▼2.46
S46	Ibrahim Hasan @ Ibrahim Azmi	15,425	46.65	▲2.46
Total valid votes		33,068	100.00	
Total rejected ballots		1,291		
Unreturned ballots		233		
Turnout		34,592	82.62	▼0.65
Registered electors		41,886		
Majority		2,218	6.70	▼4.92
BN hold		Swing		

Malaysian general election, 1990
Party	Candidate	Votes	%	∆%
BN	Abdul Rashid Muhammad	17,366	55.81	▼9.17
S46	Ibrahim Azmi Hasan	13,749	44.19	▲44.19
Total valid votes		31,115	100.00	
Total rejected ballots		875		
Unreturned ballots		0		
Turnout		31,990	83.27	▲4.12
Registered electors		38,415		
Majority		3,617	11.62	▼18.34
BN hold		Swing		

Malaysian general election, 1986
Party	Candidate	Votes	%	∆%
BN	Ibrahim Azmi Hassan	15,823	64.98	▲13.73
PAS	Abu Bakar Chik	8,527	35.02	▼10.97
Total valid votes		24,350	100.00	
Total rejected ballots		726		
Unreturned ballots		0		
Turnout		25,076	79.15	▼3.12
Registered electors		31,682		
Majority		7,296	29.96	▲24.70
BN hold		Swing		

Malaysian general election, 1982
Party	Candidate	Votes	%	∆%
BN	Ibrahim Azmi Hassan	13,325	51.25	▲51.25
PAS	Mustafa @ Hassan Ali	11,957	45.99	▲45.99
Independent	Mohamad Mahmood	719	2.77	▲2.77
Total valid votes		26,001	100.00	
Total rejected ballots		1,368		
Unreturned ballots		0		
Turnout		27,369	82.27	
Registered electors		33,269		
Majority		1,368	5.26	
BN hold		Swing		

Malaysian general election, 1978
Party	Candidate	Votes	%	∆%
On the nomination day, Nik Hassan Abdul Rahman won uncontested.
BN	Nik Hassan Abdul Rahman			
Total valid votes			100.00	
Total rejected ballots				
Unreturned ballots				
Turnout				
Registered electors				
Majority				
BN hold		Swing		

Malaysian general election, 1974
Party	Candidate	Votes	%
BN	Nik Hassan Abdul Rahman	10,894	59.22
Parti Rakyat Malaysia	Mokhtar Rahman	4,416	24.00
Independent	Abdul Rahman Long	3,087	16.78
Total valid votes		18,397	100.00
Total rejected ballots		1,027	
Unreturned ballots		0	
Turnout		19,424	75.78
Registered electors		25,535	
Majority		6,478	35.22
This was a new constituency created.
