= Tengku Muhammad Fakhruddin =

Malaysian politician

Yang Berhormat Mulia Tengku Muhammad Fakhruddin MLA
- تڠكو محمد فخرالدين

Member of the Terengganu State Legislative Assembly for Sura
- Incumbent
- Assumed office 12 August 2023
- Preceded by: Wan Hapandi Wan Nik (PN–PAS)
- Majority: 3,712 (2023)

Personal details
- Born: Terengganu, Malaysia
- Party: Malaysian Islamic Party (PAS)
- Occupation: Politician

Tengku Muhammad Fakhruddin bin Tengku Md Fauzi is a Malaysian politician who served as Member of the Terengganu State Legislative Assembly (MLA) for Sura since August 2023. He is a member of Malaysian Islamic Party (PAS), a component party of Perikatan Nasional (PN).

== Election results ==
Terengganu State Legislative Assembly
Year	Constituency	Candidate	Votes	Pct	Opponent(s)	Votes	Pct	Ballots cast	Majority	Turnout
2023	N27 Sura	Tengku Muhammad Fakhruddin (PAS)	17,395	83.06%	Othman Omar (PKR)	3,547	16.94%	21,111	13,848	69.89%
