= Jusoh =

Jusoh is a Malaysian surname that may refer to

- Che Mohamad Zulkifly Jusoh, Malaysian politician
- Idris Jusoh (born 1955), Malaysian politician
- Khairil Annas Jusoh, Malay author and academician
- Matulidi Jusoh (1957–2015), Malaysian politician
- Shukur Jusoh (born 1989), Malaysian footballer
- Siti Munirah Jusoh (born 1987), Malaysian squash player
- Rozman Jusoh, Malaysian drug trafficker
