= Alias Razak =

Malaysian politician

Yang Berhormat Dato' Dr. Alias Razak DPMT SMT MP
- ألياس بن رزاق

Member of the Terengganu State Executive Council (Local Government, Housing, Health and Environment)
- In office 10 May 2018 – 15 August 2023
- Monarch: Mizan Zainal Abidin
- Menteri Besar: Ahmad Samsuri Mokhtar
- Deputy: Ahmad Shah Muhamed
- Preceded by: Mohd Jidin Shafee (Local Government and Housing); Roslee Daud (Health); Rosli Othman (Environment)
- Succeeded by: Wan Sukairi Wan Abdullah (Local Government, Housing and Health); Razali Idris (Environment)
- Constituency: Bukit Tunggal

Member of the Malaysian Parliament for Kuala Nerus
- Incumbent
- Assumed office 19 November 2022
- Preceded by: Khairuddin Razali (GS–PAS)
- Majority: 29,765 (2022)

Member of the Terengganu State Legislative Assembly for Bukit Tunggal
- In office 8 March 2008 – 12 August 2023
- Preceded by: Mohd Nasir Ibrahim Fikri (BN–UMNO)
- Succeeded by: Zaharuddin Zahid (PN–PAS)
- Majority: 336 (2008); 652 (2013); 2,344 (2018)
- In office 29 November 1999 – 21 March 2004
- Preceded by: Mohamad Abu Bakar (BN–UMNO)
- Succeeded by: Mohd Nasir Ibrahim Fikri (BN–UMNO)
- Majority: 1,942 (1999)

Faction represented in Dewan Rakyat
- 2022–: Perikatan Nasional

Faction represented in Terengganu State Legislative Assembly
- 1999–2004: Malaysian Islamic Party
- 2008–2020: Malaysian Islamic Party
- 2020–2023: Perikatan Nasional

Personal details
- Born: Alias bin Razak; 1959 (age 66–67) Terengganu, Malaysia
- Citizenship: Malaysian
- Party: Malaysian Islamic Party (PAS)
- Other political affiliations: Perikatan Nasional (PN)
- Occupation: Politician

Alias bin Razak (born 1959) is a Malaysian politician who has served as the Member of Parliament (MP) for Kuala Nerus since November 2022. He served as Member of the Terengganu State Executive Council (EXCO) in the Perikatan Nasional (PN) state administration under Menteri Besar Ahmad Samsuri Mokhtar from May 2018 to August 2023 and Member of the Terengganu State Legislative Assembly (MLA) for Bukit Tunggal from November 1999 to March 2004 and again from March 2008 to August 2023. He is a member of the Malaysian Islamic Party (PAS), a component party of the PN coalition.

== Election results ==
Terengganu State Legislative Assembly
Year	Constituency	Candidate	Votes	Pct	Opponent(s)	Votes	Pct	Ballots cast	Majority	Turnout
1999	N12 Bukit Tunggal	Alias Razak (PAS)	4,629	63.27%	Mohd Nasir Ibrahim Fikri (UMNO)	2,687	36.73%	7,507	1,942	81.69%
2004	N12 Bukit Tunggal	Alias Razak (PAS)	4,340	46.69%	Mohd Nasir Ibrahim Fikri (UMNO)	4,956	53.31%	14,664	616	87.64%
2008	N12 Bukit Tunggal	Alias Razak (PAS)	5,483	51.58%	Tuan Arif Sahibu Fadilah Tuan Ahmad (UMNO)	5,147	48.42%	10,742	336	86.02%
2013	N12 Bukit Tunggal	Alias Razak (PAS)	6,801	52.52%	Ismail Nik (UMNO)	6,149	47.48%	13,105	652	89.20%
2018	N12 Bukit Tunggal	Alias Razak (PAS)	8,308	55.41%	Tuan Arif Sahibu Fadilah Tuan Ahmad (UMNO)	5,964	39.78%	15,242	2,344	87.50%
2018	N12 Bukit Tunggal	Alias Razak (PAS)	8,308	55.41%	Fatimah Lailati Omar (PKR)	721	4.81%	15,242	2,344	87.50%

Parliament of Malaysia
Year	Constituency	Candidate	Votes	Pct	Opponent(s)	Votes	Pct	Ballots cast	Majority	Turnout
2022	P035 Kuala Nerus	Alias Razak (PAS)	56,697	64.70%	Mohd Khairuddin Aman Razali (UMNO)	26,932	30.73%	87,628	29,765	82.71%
2022	P035 Kuala Nerus	Alias Razak (PAS)	56,697	64.70%	Suhaimi Hashim (AMANAH)	3,708	4.23%	87,628	29,765	82.71%
2022	P035 Kuala Nerus	Alias Razak (PAS)	56,697	64.70%	Azahar Wahid (PUTRA)	291	0.33%	87,628	29,765	82.71%

== Honours ==
=== Honours of Malaysia ===
- Malaysia
  - Recipient of the 17th Yang di-Pertuan Agong Installation Medal (2024)
- Terengganu
  - Companion of the Order of the Crown of Terengganu (SMT) (2019)
  - Knight Commander of the Order of the Crown of Terengganu (DPMT) – Dato' (2022)
