= Matulidi Jusoh =

Malaysian politician

Yang Berbahagia Datuk Matulidi Jusoh DPSM PPN
- ماتريدي جوسوه

Member of the Malaysian Parliament for Dungun, Terengganu
- In office 2008–2013
- Preceded by: Rosli Mat Hassan
- Succeeded by: Wan Hassan Mohd Ramli

Personal details
- Born: 5 July 1957 Terengganu, Federation of Malaya (now Malaysia)
- Died: 15 May 2015 (aged 57) Malaysia
- Party: UMNO–Barisan Nasional
- Occupation: Politician

Matulidi Jusoh (5 July 1957 – 15 May 2015) was the Member of the Parliament of Malaysia for the Dungun constituency in Terengganu from 2008 to 2013, sitting as a member of the United Malays National Organisation (UMNO) party in the ruling Barisan Nasional coalition.

Matulidi was elected to Parliament in the 2008 election, replacing Rosli Mat Hassan as the Dungun's UMNO member. Rosli then replaced Matulidi as UMNO's nominee at the 2013 election and returned to Parliament. Matulidi instead contested the seat of Paka in the Terengganu State Assembly, but was defeated by Satiful Bahari Mamat of the Pan-Malaysian Islamic Party (PAS).

== Death ==
Matulidi Jusoh died of diabetes on 15 May 2015 at 6 am, age 57.

== Election results ==
Parliament of Malaysia
Year	Constituency	Candidate	Votes	Pct	Opponent(s)	Votes	Pct	Ballots cast	Majority	Turnout
2008	P039 Dungun	Matulidi Jusoh (UMNO)	29,264	54.66%	Shamsul Iskandar Mohd Akin (PKR)	24,270	45.34%	54,464	4,994	83.98%

Terengganu State Legislative Assembly
Year	Constituency	Government	Votes	Pct	Opposition	Votes	Pct	Ballots cast	Majority	Turnout
2013	N28 Paka	Matulidi Jusoh (UMNO)	10,851	47.20%	Satiful Bahri Mamat (PAS)	12,138	52.80%	23,231	1,287	87.80%

== Honours ==
- Malaysia
  - Medal of the Order of the Defender of the Realm (PPN) (2003)
- Malacca
  - Companion Class II of the Exalted Order of Malacca (DPSM) – Datuk (2011)
