= Wan Hapandi Wan Nik =

Malaysian politician

Wan Hapandi Wan Nik AMZ
- وان هافندي وان نئ

Deputy Member of the Terengganu State Executive Council (Entrepreneurship, Micro Industry and Hawker Affairs)
- In office 16 May 2018 – 12 August 2023
- Monarch: Mizan Zainal Abidin
- Menteri Besar: Ahmad Samsuri Mokhtar
- Member: Mohd Nurkhuzaini Ab Rahman
- Constituency: Sura

Member of the Terengganu State Legislative Assembly for Sura
- In office 5 May 2013 – 12 August 2023
- Preceded by: Wan Hassan Mohd Ramli (PR–PAS)
- Succeeded by: Tengku Muhammad Fakhruddin (PN–PAS)
- Majority: 2,957 (2013); 7,162 (2018)

Faction represented in Terengganu State Legislative Assembly
- 2013–2020: Malaysian Islamic Party
- 2020–2023: Perikatan Nasional

Personal details
- Born: Wan Hapandi bin Wan Nik; 10 February 1956 (age 70) Terengganu, Malaysia
- Citizenship: Malaysian
- Party: Malaysian Islamic Party (PAS)
- Other political affiliations: Pakatan Rakyat (PR) (2008–2015); Gagasan Sejahtera (GS) (2016–2020) Perikatan Nasional (PN) (since 2020)
- Occupation: Politician

Wan Hapandi bin Wan Nik (born 10 February 1956) is a Malaysian politician who served as Deputy Member of the Terengganu State Executive Council (EXCO) in the Perikatan Nasional (PN) state administration under Menteri Besar Ahmad Samsuri Mokhtar and Member Mohd Nurkhuzaini Ab Rahman from May 2018 and Member of the Terengganu State Legislative Assembly (MLA) for Sura from May 2013 to August 2023. He is a member of the Malaysian Islamic Party (PAS), a component party of the PN coalition.

== Political career ==
=== Member of the Terengganu State Legislative Assembly (2013–2023) ===
In the 2013 Terengganu state election, Wan Hapandi was nominated by PAS to contest for the Sura state seat. He won the seat and was elected as the Sura MLA for the first term after defeating candidate of Barisan Nasional (BN) by a majority of 2,957 votes.

In the 2018 Terengganu state election, Wan Hapandi was renominated by PAS to defend the Sura seat. He defended the seat and was reelected as the Sura MLA for the second term after defeating candidates of BN and Pakatan Harapan (PH) by a majority of 7,162 votes.

In the 2023 Terengganu state election, Wan Hapandi was not renominated by PN to defend the Sura seat or contest for other seats.

=== Deputy Member of the Terengganu State Executive Council (2018–2023) ===
On 16 May 2018 after PAS took over the state administration from BN after PAS defeated BN in the 2018 state election, Wan Hapandi was appointed as Terengganu Deputy EXCO Member in charge of Entrepreneurship, Micro Industry and Hawker Affairs by Menteri Besar Ahmad Samsuri to deputise for EXCO Member Mohd Nurkhuzaini.

== Election results ==
Terengganu State Legislative Assembly
| Year | Constituency | Candidate | Votes | Pct | Opponent(s) | Votes | Pct | Ballots cast | Majority | Turnout |
|---|---|---|---|---|---|---|---|---|---|---|
| 2013 | N27 Sura | Wan Hapandi Wan Nik (PAS) | 8,952 | 59.89% | Zakariah Ali (UMNO) | 5,995 | 40.11% | 15,088 | 2,957 | 85.40% |
| 2018 | N27 Sura | Wan Hapandi Wan Nik (PAS) | 12,500 | 61.81% | Zainun Abu Bakar (UMNO) | 5,338 | 26.39% | 20,530 | 7,162 | 82.90% |
| 2018 | N27 Sura | Wan Hapandi Wan Nik (PAS) | 12,500 | 61.81% | Zulkifli Ali (AMANAH) | 2,386 | 11.80% | 20,530 | 7,162 | 82.90% |

== Honours ==
- Terengganu
  - Member of the Order of Sultan Mizan Zainal Abidin of Terengganu (AMZ) (2023)
