= Mohd Fadhli Rahmi Zulkifli =

Malaysian politician

Yang Berhormat Tuan Mohd Fadhli Rahmi Zulkifli AMT MLA

Deputy Member of the Terengganu State Executive Council
- Incumbent
- Assumed office 15 August 2023
- Monarch: Mizan Zainal Abidin
- Menteri Besar: Ahmad Samsuri Mokhtar
- Member: Hishamuddin Abdul Karim
- Portfolio: Youth and Sports Development & Non-government Organisation
- Preceded by: Hishamuddin Abdul Karim (Youth and Sports Development & Non-government Organisation)
- Constituency: Rantau Abang

Member of the Terengganu State Legislative Assembly for Rantau Abang
- Incumbent
- Assumed office 12 August 2023
- Preceded by: Alias Harun (PN–PAS)
- Majority: 12,922 (2023)

Personal details
- Party: Malaysian Islamic Party (PAS)
- Other political affiliations: Perikatan Nasional (PN)
- Occupation: Politician

Mohd Fadhli Rahmi bin Zulkifli is a Malaysian politician who has served as Deputy Member of the Terengganu State Executive Council (EXCO) in the Perikatan Nasional (PN) administration under Menteri Besar Ahmad Samsuri Mokhtar and Member Hishamuddin Abdul Karim as well as Member of the Terengganu State Legislative Assembly (MLA) for Rantau Abang since August 2023. He is a member of the Malaysian Islamic Party (PAS), a component party of the PN coalitions.

== Election results ==
Terengganu State Legislative Assembly
Year	Constituency	Candidate	Votes	Pct	Opponent(s)	Votes	Pct	Ballots cast	Majority	Turnout
2023	N26 Rantau Abang	Mohd Fadhli Rahimi Zulkifli (PAS)	18,959	75.85%	Mohd Asri Mohamad (UMNO)	6,037	24.15%	25,171	12,922	75.38%

== Honours ==
- Terengganu
  - Member of the Order of the Crown of Terengganu (AMT) (2025)
