= Khairuddin Razali =

Malaysian politician

Yang Berbahagia Datuk Wira Mohd Khairuddin Aman Razali DCSM DIMP
- محمّد خيرالدين أمان رزالي
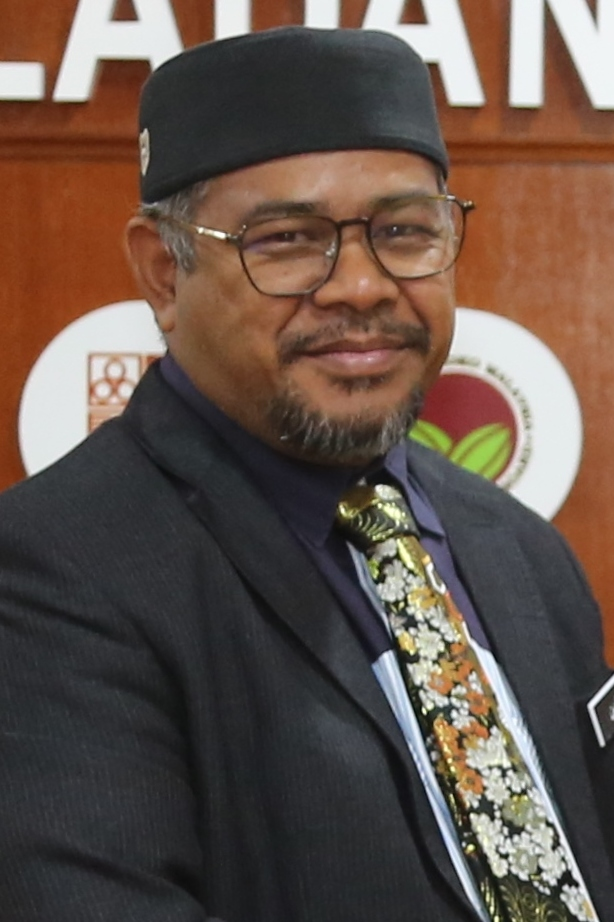

Religious Advisor to the Deputy Prime Minister
- Incumbent
- Assumed office 25 March 2023
- Monarchs: Abdullah (2023–2024); Ibrahim (since 2024)
- Prime Minister: Anwar Ibrahim
- Deputy Prime Minister: Ahmad Zahid Hamidi
- Preceded by: Position established

Minister of Plantation Industries and Commodities
- In office 10 March 2020 – 16 August 2021
- Monarch: Abdullah
- Prime Minister: Muhyiddin Yassin
- Deputy: Wee Jeck Seng & Willie Mongin
- Preceded by: Teresa Kok Suh Sim (Minister of Primary Industries)
- Succeeded by: Zuraida Kamaruddin
- Constituency: Kuala Nerus

Member of the Malaysian Parliament for Kuala Nerus
- In office 5 May 2013 – 19 November 2022
- Preceded by: Mohd Nasir Ibrahim Fikri (BN–UMNO)
- Succeeded by: Alias Razak (PN–PAS)
- Majority: 610 (2013); 8,447 (2018)

Personal details
- Born: Mohd Khairuddin bin Aman Razali; 9 December 1973 (age 52) Seberang Takir, Kuala Terengganu, Terengganu, Malaysia
- Citizenship: Malaysia
- Party: Malaysian Islamic Party (PAS) (1989–2022); Independent (2022); United Malays National Organisation (UMNO) (since 2022)
- Other political affiliations: Angkatan Perpaduan Ummah (APU) (1990–1996); Barisan Alternatif (1999–2004); Pakatan Rakyat (PR) (2008–2015); Gagasan Sejahtera (GS) (2016–2020); Perikatan Nasional (PN) (2020–2022); Barisan Nasional (BN) (since 2022)
- Spouse: Anili Ramli
- Education: University of Jordan; Al al-Bayt University; National University of Malaysia
- Occupation: Politician
- Profession: Educator

Mohd Khairuddin bin Aman Razali (Jawi محمد خيرالدين بن أمان رزالي; born 9 December 1973) is a Malaysian politician who has served as Religious Advisor to the Deputy Prime Minister Ahmad Zahid Hamidi since March 2023. He served as the Minister of Plantation Industries and Commodities in the Perikatan Nasional (PN) administration under former Prime Minister Muhyiddin Yassin from March 2020 to the collapse of the PN administration in August 2021 and Member of Parliament (MP) for Kuala Nerus from May 2013 to November 2022. He is a member of the United Malays National Organisation (UMNO), a component party of the Barisan Nasional (BN) coalition and was an independent as well as member of the Malaysian Islamic Party (PAS), a component party of the PN coalition. On 14 March 2022, Khairuddin left PAS effective immediately and later joined UMNO. He is also the Executive Secretary of the Ulama Council of UMNO.

== Background ==
Mohd Khairuddin was born in Kampung Baru, Seberang Takir, Kuala Terengganu on 9 December 1973. He is the eldest of 16 siblings.

== Education ==
Early secondary education at the Sultan Zainal Abidin Religious Secondary School, Ladang, Kuala Terengganu in 1986. After achieving outstanding results in SRP in 1988, he was offered an offer at Klang Islamic College. But the heart is bound to enter the flow of Thanawi which is fully Arabic in Sultan Zainal Abidin Religious Secondary School in Kuala Terengganu.

However, his education in the Thanawi stream could not be completed because after obtaining a successful SPM which he took privately in 1990, he was more than willing to go abroad to seek knowledge. As a result, an offer to further his studies in 1992 to the University of Jordan was accepted.

Succeeded with a Bachelor of Arts degree in Arabic Language & Literature at the University of Jordan in 1996. His undergraduate degree continued and earned a Bachelor of Arabic Language and Literature at Aal al-Bayt University, Mafraq, Jordan in 2000. Master's thesis title he was "Significant and Genetic Participatory Particles on the Syntax" (Signifikan Partikel Setara dan Genetif di sisi Sarjana Sintaksis) and "Scholar of Fiqh Proposals and their Influence on Syariah Text Understanding" (Sarjana Usul Fiqh serta pengaruhnya terhadap Kefahaman Teks Syarak)

He then obtained a PhD in Islamic Studies (2011) at the Department of Arabic & Islamic Civilization, FPI, UKM with the thesis entitled: "Waw Particle Rhetoric in the Qur'an and Its Influence on Translating the Meaning of the Qur'an into Malay (Retorik Partikel Waw Dalam al-Qur'an Dan Pengaruhnya Terhadap Penterjemahan Makna al-Qur'an ke Dalam Bahasa Melayu) . "

== Engagement in Society ==
Started lecturing on radio and TV since returning to Malaysia in 1999. Has been working on Arabic language programming 2000 on RTM Radio Nasional at 6.15pm for 3 years. Spoken at various slots on RTM Radio Nasional and IKIM Radio. Also on TV1, TV2, TV3 and more. Likewise active in lectures, discussions, seminars throughout the country in mosques, suraus and government departments and ministries. In 2004 founded Darul Fuqaha education and welfare center in Sg. Merab Bangi, Selangor and Tahfiz Intellectual Islam in 2007. He is active as a Speaker (in mosques, TV and radio), Author (books, articles and papers), Publisher (Islamic books, Social Workers and Islamic Medical Practitioners).

=== Involvement in educational organizations ===
1. Founder and chairman of Maahad Tahfiz Orphan Darul Fuqaha (2004–present)

2. Founder and chairman of the Smart Islamic Primary School Tahfiz Fuqaha (2008–present)

3. Chairman of Smart Islamic Primary School, Kuala Terengganu (2008–present)

=== Engagement in a missionary organization ===
1. Member of Political Cluster, Islamic Consultative Council (2016–2018)

2. Founder and president of Nadwah Muslim Scientist (2007–2013)

3. Founder and chairman of the Malaysian Ummah Concerned Association (2013–2018)

4. Founder of Malaysian Islamic Book Publishers and Distributors (2008–2013)

5. Member of working committee of Malaysian Scholars Association (2007–2011)

== Political career ==
=== Member of the Malaysian Islamic Party (PAS) (1989–2022) ===
He first became active in PAS after leaving his educational career. He is active in the PAS Legislative Council and has served in several capacities. He served as Treasurer of the Central PAS Clerks in the 2009–2011 term, Secretary of the Central PAS Clerk of the House (2011–2013) and Head of Information of the Central PAS Clerks (2013–2017). In addition, he has been a Member of the Central PAS Working Committee since 2013 to 2022. As the PAS Central AJK, he has held portfolios as Chairman of the PAS Central Economic Development, Property and Entrepreneur Development (2013–2022), PAS Central Vice-Chair of International Poverty Law (2015–2017) and Director of the Central PAS Strategic Institute (2013–2022). He has also been elected to the PAS Syura Syura Council since 2013 until 2022. On 14 March 2022, he resigned from PAS to be an independent politician after tendering his resignation letter to PAS Secretary-General Takiyuddin Hassan in Parliament.

=== Member of Parliament (MP) (2013–2022) ===
He contested for the Kuala Nerus seat on PAS tickets in the 2013 and 2018 as well as on BN ticket in the 2022 general elections. In 2013, he defeated the incumbent Mohd Nasir Ibrahim Fikri with slim majority by 610 votes.

He retained the seat in 2018 after defeating a well-known Motivator Tengku Asmadi Tengku Mohamad from BN and Abdullah Mohamed from Pakatan Harapan (PH) by a greater majority of 8,447 votes.

In 2022, as he was no longer a PAS member after leaving it eight months prior to the election and therefore lost the PAS ticket, he contested for the same seat on the BN ticket. However, he was defeated by PN and PAS candidate Alias Razak by a great majority of 29,765 votes and lost the seat after holding it for two terms.

=== Government official of state governments of Terengganu and Kelantan (2014–2020) ===
Immediately following the end of the Malaysian General Elections 2018, the State of Terengganu is ruled by the PAS. He has been appointed by Terengganu State Government to be the chairman of the board of 4 state-owned companies beginning 2018, namely the Terengganu Strategic & Integrity Institute (TSIS), Darul Iman Training Center (DITC), Paya Bunga Hotel, and Duyong Marina & Resort. Earlier, he was appointed by Kelantan State Government as the Kelantan Government Economic Advisory Panel since 2014.

=== Minister of Plantation Industries and Commodities (2020–2021) ===
On 1 March 2020, PN administration was established with the appointment of Muhyiddin Yassin as the new prime minister. On 10 March 2020, he was appointed as Minister of Plantation Industries by Muhyiddin. He only served briefly in the position for 17 months in the PN administration. On 16 August 2021, PN administration collapsed and he was no longer a minister. On 21 August 2021, Barisan Nasional (BN) administration was reestablished with the appointment Ismail Sabri Yaakob as prime minister. However, he was not reappointed as a minister although his party and coalition are part of the administration.

== International involvement ==
He has been active in several international organizations including being a board member and Assistant Secretary of the International Conference of Islamic members of parliament (IIFP) from 2018 to the present. He is also the Treasurer of the Youth Wing, International Conference on Asian Political Parties (ICAPP) from 2019 to the present.

== Controversy ==
He has been associated with claims by a fellow Member of Parliament that he facilitated RM82 billion worth of investments for Malaysia during a trip to Turkey, which was partly personal. Upon his return, he was found to have violated the COVID-19 quarantine regulations mandated by law. For context, Malaysia recorded RM32 billion (US$8 billion) in foreign direct investment (FDI) in 2019. Following an investigation, he was fined RM1,000 (US$250) for the quarantine breach, despite the standard penalty for similar violations often being up to RM8,000 (US$2,000) or a day in jail.

Speculation about the relatively lenient fine has centered on the political dynamics of the time. The sitting prime minister, Muhyiddin Yassin, maintained a slim two-seat majority in Parliament, and a heavier fine exceeding RM2,000 (US$500) could have resulted in Dato' Dr. Mohd Khairuddin's disqualification as an MP. This would have further jeopardized the Prime Minister's majority, potentially destabilizing his administration.

== Election results ==
Parliament of Malaysia
Year	Constituency	Candidate	Votes	Pct	Opponent(s)	Votes	Pct	Ballots cast	Majority	Turnout
2013	P035 Kuala Nerus	Mohd Khairuddin Aman Razali (PAS)	33,861	50.45%	Mohd Nasir Ibrahim Fikri (UMNO)	33,251	49.55%	68,036	610	89.24%
2018	P035 Kuala Nerus	Mohd Khairuddin Aman Razali (PAS)	37,974	52.66%	Tengku Asmadi Tengku Mohamad (UMNO)	29,527	40.95%	73,211	8,447	87.51%
2018	P035 Kuala Nerus	Mohd Khairuddin Aman Razali (PAS)	37,974	52.66%	Abdullah Mohamed (AMANAH)	4,604	6.39%	73,211	8,447	87.51%
2022	P035 Kuala Nerus	Mohd Khairuddin Aman Razali (UMNO)	26,932	30.73%	Alias Razak (PAS)	56,697	64.70%	87,628	29,765	82.71%
2022	P035 Kuala Nerus	Mohd Khairuddin Aman Razali (UMNO)	26,932	30.73%	Suhaimi Hashim (AMANAH)	3,708	4.23%	87,628	29,765	82.71%
2022	P035 Kuala Nerus	Mohd Khairuddin Aman Razali (UMNO)	26,932	30.73%	Mohd Shukri Mohd Yusoff (PEJUANG)	291	0.33%	87,628	29,765	82.71%

== Honours ==
- Malacca
  - Knight Commander of the Exalted Order of Malacca (DCSM) – Datuk Wira (2024)
- Pahang
  - Knight Companion of the Order of the Crown of Pahang (DIMP) – Dato' (2013)
