= Rantau Abang (state constituency) =

Political subdivision in Malaysia

Rantau Abang (N26)
Terengganu constituency

State constituency
- Legislature: Terengganu State Legislative Assembly
MLA
Mohd Fadhli Rahmi Zulkifli
PN
- Constituency created: 1994
- First contested: 1995
- Last contested: 2023

Demographics
- Electors (2023): 33,394

N26 Rantau Abang within Terengganu, as used for the 2023 state election

Rantau Abang is a state constituency in Terengganu, Malaysia, that has been represented in the Terengganu State Legislative Assembly.

The state constituency was first contested in 1995 and is mandated to return a single Assemblyman to the Terengganu State Legislative Assembly under the first-past-the-post voting system.

== Demographics ==
Ethnic breakdown of Rantau Abang's electorate as of 2020
1. Malay/Bumiputera (98.3%)
2. Chinese (1.40%)
3. Other ethnicities (0.30%)

== History ==
=== Polling districts ===
According to the Gazette issued on 30 March 2018, the Rantau Abang constituency has a total of 12 polling districts.

State Constituency	Polling Districts	Code	Location
Rantau Abang (N26)	Pinang	039/26/01	SK Kampung Wa
Rantau Abang (N26)	Padang Pulut	039/26/02	SK Padang Pulut
Rantau Abang (N26)	Delung	039/26/03	SK Delong
Rantau Abang (N26)	Kuala Abang	039/26/04	SK Kampung Baru Kuala Abang
Rantau Abang (N26)	Seberang Pintasa	039/26/05	SK Seberang Dungun
Rantau Abang (N26)	Pulau Serai	039/26/06	SMK Pulau Serai
Rantau Abang (N26)	Tok Kah	039/26/07	SK Tok Kah
Rantau Abang (N26)	Che Lijah	039/26/08	SK Tanjung Pati
Rantau Abang (N26)	Gong Pasir	039/26/09	SK Gong Pasir
Rantau Abang (N26)	Serdang	039/26/10	SK Serdang
Rantau Abang (N26)	Balai Besar	039/26/11	SK Balai Besar
Rantau Abang (N26)	Taman Permit Indah	039/26/12	SMK Tengku Intan Zaharah

=== Representation history ===
Members of the Legislative Assembly for Rantau Abang
Assembly	No	Years	Member	Party
Constituency created from Jerangau, Merchang, Sura and Paka
9th	N26	1995–1999	Shafiee Daud	BN (UMNO)
10th	N26	1999–2004	Azman Shapawi Abdul Rani	BA (PAS)
11th	N26	2004–2008	Za'abar Mohd Adib	BN (UMNO)
12th	N26	2008–2013	Za'abar Mohd Adib	BN (UMNO)
13th	N26	2013–2015	Alias Harun	PR (PAS)
13th	N26	2015–2016	Alias Harun	PAS
13th	N26	2016–2018	Alias Harun	GS (PAS)
14th	N26	2018–2020	Alias Harun	GS (PAS)
14th	N26	2020–2023	Alias Harun	PN (PAS)
15th	N26	2023–present	Mohd Fadhli Rahmi Zulkifli	PN (PAS)

== Election results ==
Terengganu state election, 2023
Party	Candidate	Votes	%	∆%
PAS	Mohd Fadhli Rahmi Zulkifli	18,959	75.85	▲17.51
BN	Mohd Asri Mohamad	6,037	24.15	▼13.05
Total valid votes		24,996	100.00	
Total rejected ballots		156		
Unreturned ballots		19		
Turnout		25,171	75.38	
Registered electors		33,394		
Majority		12,922	51.70	
PAS hold		Swing		
Source(s) Astro Awani

Terengganu state election, 2018
Party	Candidate	Votes	%	∆%
PAS	Alias Harun	12,287	58.34	▲8.20
BN	Wan Zaulkfli Wan Gati	7,835	37.20	▼12.15
PKR	Mohammad Padeli Jusoh	939	4.46	▲4.46
Total valid votes		21,061	100.00	
Total rejected ballots		242		
Unreturned ballots		108		
Turnout		21,411	86.27	▼1.84
Registered electors		24,819		
Majority		4,452	21.14	▲20.35
PAS hold		Swing		

Terengganu state election, 2013
Party	Candidate	Votes	%	∆%
PAS	Alias Harun	8,964	50.14	▲2.97
BN	Za'abar Mohd Adib	8,823	49.35	▼3.48
Independent	Mazlan Harun	90	0.50	▲0.50
Total valid votes		17,877	100.00	
Total rejected ballots		248		
Unreturned ballots		41		
Turnout		18,166	88.11	▲2.09
Registered electors		20,618		
Majority		141	0.79	▼4.87
PAS gain from BN		Swing		-

Terengganu state election, 2008
Party	Candidate	Votes	%	∆%
BN	Za'abar Mohd Adib	7,372	52.83	▼1.32
PAS	Azman Shapawi Abdul Rani	6,582	47.17	▲1.32
Total valid votes		13,954	100.00	
Total rejected ballots		217		
Unreturned ballots		21		
Turnout		14,192	86.02	▼2.50
Registered electors		16,499		
Majority		790	5.66	▼2.64
BN hold		Swing		

Terengganu state election, 2004
Party	Candidate	Votes	%	∆%
BN	Za'abar Mohd Adib	6,167	54.15	▲18.26
PAS	Azman Shapawi Abdul Rani	5,222	45.85	▼18.26
Total valid votes		11,389	100.00	
Total rejected ballots		194		
Unreturned ballots		0		
Turnout		11,583	88.52	▲5.79
Registered electors		13,085		
Majority		945	8.30	▼19.92
BN gain from PAS		Swing		-

Terengganu state election, 1999
Party	Candidate	Votes	%	∆%
PAS	Azman Shapawi Abdul Rani	5,550	64.11	
BN	Shafiee Daud	3,107	35.89	
Total valid votes		8,657	100.00	
Total rejected ballots		220		
Unreturned ballots		0		
Turnout		8,877	82.73	▲82.73
Registered electors		10,730		
Majority		2,443	28.22	▲28.22
PAS gain from BN		Swing		-

Terengganu state election, 1995
Party	Candidate	Votes	%
On the nomination day, Shafiee Daud won uncontested.
BN	Shafiee Daud		
Total valid votes			
Total rejected ballots			
Unreturned ballots			
Turnout			
Registered electors		10,033	
Majority			
This was a new constituency created.
