= Wan Sukairi Wan Abdullah =

Malaysian politician

Yang Berhormat Dato' Wan Sukairi Wan Abdullah DPMT SMZ SMT MLA
- وان سوكايري بن وان عبدﷲ

Member of the Terengganu State Executive Council
- Incumbent
- Assumed office 15 August 2023
- Monarch: Mizan Zainal Abidin
- Menteri Besar: Ahmad Samsuri Mokhtar
- Portfolio: Health, Housing and Local Government since 16 August 2023
- Constituency: Wakaf Mempelam
- In office 10 May 2018 – 15 August 2023
- Monarch: Mizan Zainal Abidin
- Deputy: Hishamuddin Abdul Karim
- Menteri Besar: Ahmad Samsuri Mokhtar
- Portfolio: Youth, Sports and Non-governmental Organisations
- Preceded by: Rozi Mamat
- Succeeded by: Hishamuddin Abdul Karim
- Constituency: Wakaf Mempelam

Member of the Terengganu State Legislative Assembly for Wakaf Mempelam
- Incumbent
- Assumed office 9 May 2018
- Preceded by: Mohd Abdul Wahid Endut (PR–PAS)
- Majority: 7,378 (2018); 18,627 (2023)

Faction represented in Terengganu State Legislative Assembly
- 2018–2020: Malaysian Islamic Party
- 2020–: Perikatan Nasional

Personal details
- Born: Wan Sukairi bin Wan Abdullah Terengganu, Malaysia
- Citizenship: Malaysian
- Party: Malaysian Islamic Party (PAS)
- Other political affiliations: Perikatan Nasional (PN); Muafakat Nasional (MN); Gagasan Sejahtera (GS)
- Occupation: Politician

Wan Sukairi bin Wan Abdullah is a Malaysian politician and who has served as Member of the Terengganu State Executive Council (EXCO) in the Perikatan Nasional (PN) state administration under Menteri Besar Ahmad Samsuri Mokhtar as well as Member of the Terengganu State Legislative Assembly (MLA) for Wakaf Mempelam since May 2018. He is a member of the Malaysian Islamic Party (PAS), a component party of PN coalition. As the Terengganu EXCO Member in charge of Local Government, he played a key role in controversially banning non-Muslim female singers from performing on stage in Terengganu.

== Election results ==
Terengganu State Legislative Assembly
Year	Constituency	Candidate	Votes	Pct	Opponent(s)	Votes	Pct	Ballots cast	Majority	Turnout
2018	N13 Wakaf Mempelam	Wan Sukairi Wan Abdullah (PAS)	14,796	61.47%	Salleh Othman (UMNO)	7,418	30.81%	24,129	7,378	86.00%
2018	N13 Wakaf Mempelam	Wan Sukairi Wan Abdullah (PAS)	14,796	61.47%	Mohd Zubir Mohamed (AMANAH)	1,859	7.72%	24,129	7,378	86.00%
2023	N13 Wakaf Mempelam	Wan Sukairi Wan Abdullah (PAS)	22,345	85.73%	Wan Mohd Haikal Wan Ghazali (PKR)	3,718	14.27%	26,259	18,627	76.09%

== Honours ==
- Terengganu
  - Knight Commander of the Order of the Crown of Terengganu (DPMT) – Dato' (2024)
  - Companion of the Order of Sultan Mizan Zainal Abidin of Terengganu (SMZ) (2022)
  - Companion of the Order of the Crown of Terengganu (SMT)
