= Satiful Bahri Mamat =

Malaysian politician

Yang Berhormat Dato' Ustaz Hj. Satiful Bahri Mamat DPMT SMZ MLA
- ساتف البحري بن مامت

Member of the Terengganu State Executive Council
- Incumbent
- Assumed office 15 August 2023; Education, Higher Education, Science and Technology, Human Capital
- Monarch: Mizan Zainal Abidin
- Deputy: Ahmad Shah Muhamed
- Menteri Besar: Ahmad Samsuri Mokhtar
- Preceded by: Himself (Education & Higher Education); Portfolio established Science and Technology; Mohd Nor Hamzah (Human Capital)
- Constituency: Paka
- In office 16 May 2018 – 15 August 2023; Syariah Implementation, Education and Higher Education
- Monarch: Mizan Zainal Abidin
- Deputy: Maliaman Kassim
- Menteri Besar: Ahmad Samsuri Mokhtar
- Succeeded by: Muhammad Khalil Abdul Hadi (Syariah Implementation); Himself (Education & Higher Education)
- Constituency: Paka

Member of the Terengganu State Legislative Assembly for Paka
- Incumbent
- Assumed office 5 May 2013
- Preceded by: Mohd Ariffin Abdullah (BN–UMNO)
- Majority: 1,287 (2013); 3,405 (2018); 11,876 (2023)
- In office 29 November 1999 – 21 March 2004
- Preceded by: Engku Bijaya Sura Syed Omar Mohamed (BN–UMNO)
- Succeeded by: Mohd Ariffin Abdullah (BN–UMNO)
- Majority: 2,686 (1999)

Faction represented in Terengganu State Legislative Assembly
- 1999–2004: Malaysian Islamic Party
- 2013–2020: Malaysian Islamic Party
- 2020–: Perikatan Nasional

Personal details
- Born: 28 October 1967 (age 58) Kampung Nyior, Paka, Terengganu, Malaysia
- Citizenship: Malaysian
- Party: Malaysian Islamic Party (PAS)
- Other political affiliations: Barisan Alternatif; Pakatan Rakyat; Gagasan Sejahtera; Perikatan Nasional
- Occupation: Politician

Satiful Bahri bin Mamat is a Malaysian politician who has served as Member of the Terengganu State Executive Council (EXCO) in the Perikatan Nasional (PN) state administration under Menteri Besar Ahmad Samsuri Mokhtar since May 2018 as well as Member of the Terengganu State Legislative Assembly (MLA) for Paka from December 1999 to March 2004 and again since May 2013. He is a member of the Malaysian Islamic Party (PAS), a component party of the PN coalition.

== Political career ==
=== Member of the Terengganu State Legislative Assembly (1999–2004 & since 2013) ===
In the 1999 Terengganu state election, Satiful made his electoral debut after being nominated by PAS fo contest for the Paka state seat. He won the seat and was elected into the Terengganu State Legislative Assembly as the Paka MLA for the first term after defeating defending candidate of Barisan Nasional (BN) by a majority of 2,686 votes.

In the 2004 Terengganu state election, Satiful was renominated by PAS to defend the seat. He lost the seat after losing to Mohd Ariffin Abdullah of BN by minority of 1,444 votes.

In the 2008 Terengganu state election, Satiful was renominated by PAS to contest for the Paka seat. He again lost to Mohd Ariffin of BN by a minority of 344 votes.

In the 2013 Terengganu state election, Satiful was renominated by PAS to contest for the Paka seat. He regained the seat and was elected as the Paka MLA for the second term after defeating candidate of BN by a majority of 1,287 votes.

In the 2018 Terengganu state election, Satiful was renominated by PAS to defend the Paka seat. He defended the seat and was elected as the Paka MLA for the third term after defeating candidates of BN and Pakatan Harapan (PH) by a majority of 3,405 votes.

=== Member of the Terengganu State Executive Council (since 2018) ===
On 10 May 2018 after PAS took over the state administration from BN after PAS defeated BN in the 2018 state election, Satiful was appointed as Terengganu EXCO Member in charge of Syariah Implementation, Education and Higher Education by Menteri Besar Ahmad Samsuri.

== Election results ==
Terengganu State Legislative Assembly
Year	Constituency	Candidate	Votes	Pct	Opponent(s)	Votes	Pct	Ballots cast	Majority	Turnout
1999	N28 Paka	Satiful Bahri Mamat (PAS)	6,706	62.52%	Rosli Mat Hassan (UMNO)	4,020	36.73%	10,949	2,686	84.53%
2004	N28 Paka	Satiful Bahri Mamat (PAS)	6,989	45.32%	Mohd Ariffin Abdullah (UMNO)	8,433	54.68%	15,604	1,444	88.17%
2008	N28 Paka	Satiful Bahri Mamat (PAS)	8,462	49.00%	Mohd Ariffin Abdullah (UMNO)	8,806	51.00%	17,471	344	84.36%
2013	N28 Paka	Satiful Bahri Mamat (PAS)	12,138	52.80%	Matulidi Jusoh (UMNO)	10,851	47.20%	23,191	1,287	87.80%
2018	N28 Paka	Satiful Bahri Mamat (PAS)	11,853	53.46%	Tengku Hamzah Tengku Draman (UMNO)	8,448	38.12%	22,527	3,405	85.20%
2018	N28 Paka	Satiful Bahri Mamat (PAS)	11,853	53.46%	Mohd Hasbie Muda (AMANAH)	1,866	8.42%	22,527	3,405	85.20%
2023	N28 Paka	Satiful Bahri Mamat (PAS)	18,681	73.30%	Ahmad Abdullah Abdul Wahab (UMNO)	6,805	26.70%	25,654	11,876	73.64%

== Honours ==
- Terengganu
  - Knight Commander of the Order of the Crown of Terengganu (DPMT) – Dato' (2022)
  - Companion of the Order of Sultan Mizan Zainal Abidin of Terengganu (SMZ) (2019)
