= Tepuh =

Political subdivision in Malaysia

Tepuh (N09)
Terengganu constituency

State constituency
- Legislature: Terengganu State Legislative Assembly
MLA
Hishamuddin Abdul Karim
PN
- Constituency created: 1984
- First contested: 1986
- Last contested: 2023

Demographics
- Electors (2023): 30,448

N09 Tepuh within Terengganu, as used for the 2023 state election

Tepuh is a state constituency in Terengganu, Malaysia, that has been represented in the Terengganu State Legislative Assembly.

The state constituency was first contested in 1986 and is mandated to return a single Assemblyman to the Terengganu State Legislative Assembly under the first-past-the-post voting system.

== Demographics ==
Ethnic breakdown of Tepuh's electorate as of 2018
1. Malay (99.0%)
2. Chinese (0.63%)
3. Other ethnicities (0.31%)
4. Indian (0.06%)

== History ==
=== Polling districts ===
According to the Gazette issued on 30 March 2018, the Tepuh constituency has a total of 11 polling districts.

State Constituency	Polling Districts	Code	Location
Tepuh (N09)	FELDA Belara	035/09/01	SK LKTP Belara
Tepuh (N09)	Gemuruh	035/09/02	SK Kampung Gemuroh
Tepuh (N09)	Bukit Guntung	035/09/03	SK Bukit Guntong
Tepuh (N09)	Tepuh	035/09/04	SK Bukit Nenas
Tepuh (N09)	Padang Air	035/09/05	SK Padang Air
Tepuh (N09)	Tok Jiring	035/09/06	SMA Dato' Haji Abbas
Tepuh (N09)	Padang Nanas	035/09/07	Dewan Sivik Padang Nenas
Tepuh (N09)	Taman Perumahan Gong Badak	035/09/08	SK Gong Badak
Tepuh (N09)	Lerek	035/09/09	SMK Bukit Guntong
Tepuh (N09)	Gong Datuk	035/09/10	SK Tanjung Gelam
Tepuh (N09)	Wakaf Tembesu	035/09/11	SMK Kompleks Gong Badak

=== Representation history ===
Members of the Legislative Assembly for Tepuh
Assembly	No	Years	Members	Party
Constituency created from Langkap, Jeram and Seberang Takir
7th	N09	1986–1990	Abdul Rashid Muhammad	BN (UMNO)
8th	N09	1990–1995	Abdullah @ Wahab Said	BN (UMNO)
9th	N09	1995–1999	Abu Bakar Abdullah	PAS
10th	N09	1999–2004	Abu Bakar Abdullah	PAS
11th	N09	2004–2008	Muhammad Ramli Nuh	BN (UMNO)
12th	N09	2008–2013	Muhammad Ramli Nuh	BN (UMNO)
13th	N09	2013–2018	Hishamuddin Abdul Karim	PR (PAS)
14th	N09	2018–2020	Hishamuddin Abdul Karim	PAS
14th	N09	2020–2023	Hishamuddin Abdul Karim	PN (PAS)
15th	N09	2023–present	Hishamuddin Abdul Karim	PN (PAS)

== Election results ==
Terengganu state election, 2023: Tepuh
Party	Candidate	Votes	%	∆%
PAS	Hishamuddin Abdul Karim	17,049	73.47	▲19.15
BN	Muhammad Hanafi Hasan	6,155	26.53	▼14.10
Total valid votes		23,204	100.00	
Total rejected ballots		122		
Unreturned ballots		26		
Turnout		23,352	76.69	▼10.41
Registered electors		30,448		
Majority		10,894	46.94	▲33.25
PAS hold		Swing		

Terengganu state election, 2018: Tepuh
Party	Candidate	Votes	%	∆%
PAS	Hishamuddin Abdul Karim	10,782	54.32	▲3.80
BN	Basir Ismail	8,065	40.63	▼8.85
PKR	Wan Hafizie Suzlie Wan Hassan	1,002	5.05	▲5.05
Total valid votes		19,849	100.00	
Total rejected ballots		194		
Unreturned ballots		89		
Turnout		20,132	87.11	▼1.40
Registered electors		23,111		
Majority		2,717	13.69	▲12.65
PAS hold		Swing		

Terengganu state election, 2013: Tepuh
Party	Candidate	Votes	%	∆%
PAS	Hishamuddin Abdul Karim	11,128	50.52	▲1.80
BN	Muhammad Ramli Nuh	10,899	49.48	▼1.80
Total valid votes		22,027	100.00	
Total rejected ballots		220		
Unreturned ballots		24		
Turnout		22,271	88.51	▲4.30
Registered electors		25,162		
Majority		229	1.04	▼1.57
PAS gain from BN		Swing		?

Terengganu state election, 2008: Tepuh
Party	Candidate	Votes	%	∆%
BN	Muhammad Ramli Nuh	8,445	51.28	▼1.41
PAS	Abu Bakar Abdullah	8,025	48.72	▲1.41
Total valid votes		16,480	100.00	
Total rejected ballots		192		
Unreturned ballots		43		
Turnout		16,715	84.21	▼3.22
Registered electors		19,850		
Majority		430	2.61	▼2.77
BN hold		Swing		

Terengganu state election, 2004: Tepuh
Party	Candidate	Votes	%	∆%
BN	Muhammad Ramli Nuh	7,583	52.69	
PAS	Abu Bakar Abdullah	6,809	47.31	
Total valid votes		14,392	100.00	
Total rejected ballots		156		
Unreturned ballots		8		
Turnout		14,556	87.43	▲5.53
Registered electors		16,649		
Majority		774	5.38	▼22.80
BN gain from PAS		Swing		?

Terengganu state election, 1999: Tepuh
Party	Candidate	Votes	%	∆%
PAS	Abu Bakar Abdullah	6,952	64.09	▲12.34
BN	Hassan Ali	3,895	35.91	▼12.34
Total valid votes		10,847	100.00	
Total rejected ballots		249		
Unreturned ballots		22		
Turnout		11,118	81.90	▲1.00
Registered electors		13,575		
Majority		3,057	28.18	▲24.68
PAS hold		Swing		

Terengganu state election, 1995: Tepuh
Party	Candidate	Votes	%	∆%
PAS	Abu Bakar Abdullah	5,079	51.75	▲7.61
BN	Abdullah Said	4,735	48.25	▼7.61
Total valid votes		9,814	100.00	
Total rejected ballots		208		
Unreturned ballots		10		
Turnout		10,032	80.90	▼1.53
Registered electors		12,400		
Majority		344	3.51	▼8.22
PAS gain from BN		Swing		-

Terengganu state election, 1990: Tepuh
Party	Candidate	Votes	%	∆%
BN	Abdullah Said	4,966	55.86	▼8.55
PAS	Abu Bakar Abdullah	3,924	44.14	▲8.55
Total valid votes		8,890	100.00	
Total rejected ballots		353		
Unreturned ballots		5		
Turnout		9,248	82.43	▲4.26
Registered electors		11,219		
Majority		1,042	11.72	▼17.09
BN hold		Swing		

Terengganu state election, 1986: Tepuh
Party	Candidate	Votes	%
BN	Abdul Rashid Muhammad	4,629	64.41
PAS	Abu Bakar Abdullah	2,558	35.59
Total valid votes		7,187	100.00
Total rejected ballots		322	
Unreturned ballots		0	
Turnout		7,509	78.17
Registered electors		9,606	
Majority		2,071	28.82
This was a new constituency created.
