= Hishamuddin Abdul Karim =

Malaysian politician

Yang Berhormat Tuan Haji Hishamuddin Abdul Karim SMT MLA
- هشام الدين بن عبدالكريم

Member of the Terengganu State Executive Council
- Incumbent
- Assumed office 16 August 2023 (Youth, Sports and Non-governmental Organisations)
- Monarch: Mizan Zainal Abidin
- Menteri Besar: Ahmad Samsuri Mokhtar
- Preceded by: Wan Sukairi Wan Abdullah
- Constituency: Tepuh

Deputy Member of the Terengganu State Executive Council
- In office 10 May 2018 – 16 August 2023 (Youth, Sports and Non-governmental Organisations)
- Monarch: Mizan Zainal Abidin
- Menteri Besar: Ahmad Samsuri Mokhtar
- Member: Wan Sukairi Wan Abdullah
- Preceded by: Position established
- Succeeded by: Mohd Fadhli Rahmi Zulkifli
- Constituency: Tepuh

Member of the Terengganu State Legislative Assembly for Tepuh
- Incumbent
- Assumed office 5 May 2013
- Preceded by: Mohd Ramli Nuh (BN–UMNO)
- Majority: 229 (2013); 2,717 (2018); 10,894 (2023)

Faction represented in Terengganu State Legislative Assembly
- 2013–2020: Malaysian Islamic Party
- 2020–: Perikatan Nasional

Personal details
- Born: 2 November 1978 (age 47) Terengganu, Malaysia
- Citizenship: Malaysian
- Party: Malaysian Islamic Party (PAS)
- Other political affiliations: Pakatan Rakyat (PR); Gagasan Sejahtera (GS); Perikatan Nasional (PN)
- Spouse: Syamilah Sulaiman
- Children: 5
- Parent(s): Haji Abdul Karim Ali; Hajah Ramlah Talib
- Education: Al-Azhar University
- Occupation: Politician

Yang Berhormat Tuan Haji Hishamuddin bin Abdul Karim (born 2 November 1978) is a Malaysian politician who has served as Deputy Member of the Terengganu State Executive Council (EXCO) in the Perikatan Nasional (PN) state administration under Menteri Besar Ahmad Samsuri Mokhtar and Member Wan Sukairi Wan Abdullah from May 2018 to August 2023 and Member of the Terengganu State Executive Council (EXCO) since August 2023 as well as Member of the Terengganu State Legislative Assembly (MLA) for Tepuh since May 2013. He is a member of the Malaysian Islamic Party (PAS), a component party of the PN and formerly Pakatan Rakyat (PR) coalitions.

== Election results ==
Terengganu State Legislative Assembly
Year	Constituency	Candidate	Votes	Pct	Opponent(s)	Votes	Pct	Ballots cast	Majority	Turnout
2013	N09 Tepuh	Hishamuddin Abdul Karim (PAS)	11,128	50.52%	Mohamad Ramli Nuh (UMNO)	10,899	49.48%	22,247	229	88.60%
2018	N09 Tepuh	Hishamuddin Abdul Karim (PAS)	10,782	54.32%	Basir Ismail (UMNO)	8,065	40.63%	20,132	2,717	87.10%
2018	N09 Tepuh	Hishamuddin Abdul Karim (PAS)	10,782	54.32%	Wan Hafizie Suzlie Wan Hassan (PPBM)	1,002	5.05%	20,132	2,717	87.10%
2023	N09 Tepuh	Hishamuddin Abdul Karim (PAS)	17,049	73.47%	Muhamad Hanafi Hasan (UMNO)	6,155	26.53%	23,352	10,894	76.69%

== Honours ==
- Terengganu
  - Companion of the Order of the Crown of Terengganu (SMT) (2023)
