= Bukit Tunggal =

Political subdivision in Malaysia

Bukit Tunggal (N12)
Terengganu constituency

State constituency
- Legislature: Terengganu State Legislative Assembly
MLA
Zaharudin Zahid
PN
- Constituency created: 1973
- First contested: 1974
- Last contested: 2023

Demographics
- Electors (2023): 21,055

N12 Bukit Tunggal within Terengganu, as used for the 2023 state election

Bukit Tunggal is a state constituency in Terengganu, Malaysia, that has been represented in the Terengganu State Legislative Assembly.

The state constituency was first contested in 1974 and is mandated to return a single Assemblyman to the Terengganu State Legislative Assembly under the first-past-the-post voting system.

== Demographics ==
Ethnic breakdown of Bukit Tunggal's electorate as of 2018
1. Malay (98.2%)
2. Chinese (1.54%)
3. Other ethnicities (0.16%)
4. Indian (0.13%)

== History ==
=== Polling districts ===
According to the Gazette issued on 30 March 2018, the Bukit Tunggal constituency has a total of 7 polling districts.

State Constituency	Polling Districts	Code	Location
Bukit Tunggal (N12)	Batu Enam	035/12/01	SMK Kompleks Tembesu; SK Tok Jering
Bukit Tunggal (N12)	Pak Katak	035/12/02	Kolej Vokesional Wakaf Tembesu
Bukit Tunggal (N12)	Bukit Tumbuh	035/12/03	SK Bukit Tumbuh
Bukit Tunggal (N12)	Bukit Tunggal	035/12/04	SK Bukit Tunggal; Balai Raya Dan Futsal Seberang Baruh
Bukit Tunggal (N12)	Duyung	035/12/05	SK Duyong
Bukit Tunggal (N12)	Pulau Ketam	035/12/06	Dewan Sivik Pulau Duyong
Bukit Tunggal (N12)	Gong Kijang	035/12/07	SMK Bukit Tunggal

=== Representation history ===
Members of the Legislative Assembly for Bukit Tunggal
Assembly	No	Years	Member	Party
Constituency created from Kuala Nerus, Jeram and Langkap
4th	N14	1974–1978	Abdul Rahman Awang	BN (UMNO)
5th	N14	1978–1982	Abdul Rahman Awang	BN (UMNO)
6th	N14	1982–1986	Ahmad Kassim @ Ghazali Endut	BN (UMNO)
7th	N12	1986–1990	Ahmad Kassim @ Ghazali Endut	BN (UMNO)
8th	N12	1990–1995	Adam @ Mansor Ali	S46
9th	N12	1995–1999	Mohamad Abu Bakar	BN (UMNO)
10th	N12	1999–2004	Alias Razak	PAS
11th	N12	2004–2008	Mohd Nasir Ibrahim Fikri	BN (UMNO)
12th	N12	2008–2013	Alias Razak	PR (PAS)
13th	N12	2013–2018	Alias Razak	PR (PAS)
14th	N12	2018–2020	Alias Razak	PAS
14th	N12	2020–2023	Alias Razak	PN (PAS)
15th	N12	2023–present	Zaharudin Zahid	PN (PAS)

== Election results ==
Terengganu state election, 2023: Bukit Tunggal
Party	Candidate	Votes	%	∆%
PAS	Zaharudin Zahid	12,066	73.52	▲18.11
BN	Wan Noorislam Wan Hashim	4,345	26.4	▼13.30
Total valid votes		16,411	100.00	
Total rejected ballots		108		
Unreturned ballots		16		
Turnout		16,535	78.53	▼8.98
Registered electors		21,055		
Majority		7,721	47.05	▲31.41
PAS hold		Swing		

Terengganu state election, 2018: Bukit Tunggal
Party	Candidate	Votes	%	∆%
PAS	Alias Razak	8,308	55.41	▲2.90
BN	Tuan Arif Sahibu Fadilah Tuan Ahmad	5,964	39.78	▼7.70
PKR	Fatimah Lailati binti Omar	721	4.81	▲4.81
Total valid votes		14,993	100.00	
Total rejected ballots		198		
Unreturned ballots		51		
Turnout		15,242	87.51	▼1.51
Registered electors		17,417		
Majority		2,344	15.63	▲10.60
PAS hold		Swing		

Terengganu state election, 2013: Bukit Tunggal
Party	Candidate	Votes	%	∆%
PAS	Alias Razak	6,801	52.52	▲0.94
BN	Ismail Nik	6,149	47.48	▼0.94
Total valid votes		12,950	100.00	
Total rejected ballots		155		
Unreturned ballots		20		
Turnout		13,125	89.03	▲3.01
Registered electors		14,743		
Majority		652	5.03	▲1.87
PAS hold		Swing		

Terengganu state election, 2008: Bukit Tunggal
Party	Candidate	Votes	%	∆%
PAS	Alias Razak	5,483	51.58	▼1.73
BN	Tuan Arif Sahibu Fadilah Tuan Ahmad	5,147	48.42	▲1.73
Total valid votes		10,630	100.00	
Total rejected ballots		103		
Unreturned ballots		9		
Turnout		10,742	86.02	▼1.93
Registered electors		12,488		
Majority		336	3.16	▼3.47
PAS hold		Swing		

Terengganu state election, 2004: Bukit Tunggal
Party	Candidate	Votes	%	∆%
PAS	Mohamed Nasir Ibrahim Fikri	4,956	53.31	▼9.96
BN	Alias Razak	4,340	46.69	▲9.96
Total valid votes		9,296	100.00	
Total rejected ballots		127		
Unreturned ballots		3		
Turnout		9,426	87.95	▲6.26
Registered electors		10,718		
Majority		616	6.63	▼19.92
PAS hold		Swing		

Terengganu state election, 1999: Bukit Tunggal
Party	Candidate	Votes	%	∆%
PAS	Alias Razak	4,629	63.27	▲63.27
BN	Mohamed Nasir Ibrahim Fikri	2,687	36.73	▼16.14
Total valid votes		7,316	100.00	
Total rejected ballots		176		
Unreturned ballots		15		
Turnout		7,507	81.69	▲1.50
Registered electors		9,190		
Majority		1,942	26.54	▲20.81
PAS gain from BN		Swing		-

Terengganu state election, 1995: Bukit Tunggal
Party	Candidate	Votes	%	∆%
BN	Mohamad Abu Bakar	3,567	52.87	▲4.68
PAS	Adam Ali	3,180	47.13	▼4.68
Total valid votes		6,747	100.00	
Total rejected ballots		208		
Unreturned ballots		8		
Turnout		6,963	80.19	▼1.78
Registered electors		8,683		
Majority		387	5.74	▲2.11
BN gain from S46		Swing		-

Terengganu state election, 1990: Bukit Tunggal
Party	Candidate	Votes	%	∆%
S46	Adam Ali	3,387	51.81	▲51.81
BN	Ahmad Kasim @ Ghazali Endut	3,150	48.19	▲48.19
Total valid votes		6,537	100.00	
Total rejected ballots		177		
Unreturned ballots		12		
Turnout		6,726	81.97	▲4.23
Registered electors		8,205		
Majority		237	3.63	▼26.59
S46 gain from BN		Swing		-

Terengganu state election, 1986: Bukit Tunggal
Party	Candidate	Votes	%	∆%
BN	Ahmad Kasim @ Ghazali Endut	3,510	65.11	▲65.11
PAS	Rashid Omar	1,881	34.89	▲0.44
Total valid votes		5,391	100.00	
Total rejected ballots		240		
Unreturned ballots		0		
Turnout		5,631	77.74	▼0.95
Registered electors		7,243		
Majority		1,629	30.22	▼0.87
BN hold		Swing		

Terengganu state election, 1982: Bukit Tunggal
Party	Candidate	Votes	%	∆%
BN	Ahmad Kasim @ Ghazali Endut	3,755	65.54	
PAS	Awang Abu Bakar	1,974	34.46	
Total valid votes		5,729	100.00	
Total rejected ballots		179		
Unreturned ballots		0		
Turnout		5,908	78.69	▲78.69
Registered electors		7,508		
Majority		1,781	31.09	▲31.09
BN hold		Swing		

Terengganu state election, 1978: Bukit Tunggal
Party	Candidate	Votes	%	∆%
On the nomination day, Abdul Rahman Awang won uncontested.
BN	Abdul Rahman Awang			
Total valid votes				
Total rejected ballots				
Unreturned ballots				
Turnout				
Registered electors		6,777		
Majority				
BN hold		Swing		

Terengganu state election, 1974: Bukit Tunggal
Party	Candidate	Votes	%	∆%
BN	Abdul Rahman Awang	2,998	68.90	▲19.41
Parti Sosialis Rakyat Malaysia	Che Mam	1,353	31.10	▲31.10
Total valid votes		4,351	100.00	
Total rejected ballots		288		
Unreturned ballots		0		
Turnout		4,639	75.11	▼1.30
Registered electors		6,176		
Majority		1,645	37.81	▲36.80
This was a new constituency created.
