= Mohd Nasir Ibrahim Fikri =

Malaysian politician

Yang Berbahagia Datuk Mohd Nasir Ibrahim Fikri PJN DPMT KMN
- محمد ناصر إبراهيم فکري

Member of the Malaysian Parliament for Kuala Nerus, Terengganu
- In office 2008–2013
- Preceded by: Che Azmi Abdul Rahman
- Succeeded by: Mohd Khairuddin Aman Razali

Personal details
- Born: 4 March 1957 (age 69) Terengganu, Federation of Malaya (now Malaysia)
- Party: United Malays National Organisation (UMNO)
- Other political affiliations: Barisan Nasional (BN); Perikatan Nasional (PN); Muafakat Nasional (MN)
- Occupation: Politician
- Website: ybnasir.blogspot.com

Mohd Nasir bin Ibrahim Fikri (born 4 March 1957) was a Member of the Parliament of Malaysia. He was elected to the Parliament for the Kuala Nerus constituency in Terengganu in 2008, as a member of the United Malays National Organisation (UMNO) party in the ruling Barisan Nasional coalition. He was defeated for re-election in 2013 by 610 votes. The seat fell to Mohd Khairuddin Aman Razali of the Pan-Malaysian Islamic Party (PAS).

Before entering federal politics, Mohd Nasir was a member of the State Assembly of Terengganu and served on the state's Executive Council.

== Election results ==
Terengganu State Legislative Assembly
Year	Constituency	Candidate	Votes	Pct	Opponent(s)	Votes	Pct	Ballot casts	Majority	Turnout
1999	N12 Bukit Tunggal	Mohd Nasir Ibrahim Fikri (UMNO)	2,687	36.73%	Alias Razak (PAS)	4,629	62.27%	7,507	1,942	81.69%
2004	N12 Bukit Tunggal	Mohd Nasir Ibrahim Fikri (UMNO)	4,956	53.31%	Alias Razak (PAS)	4,340	46.69%	9,426	616	87.95%

Parliament of Malaysia
Year	Constituency	Candidate	Votes	Pct	Opponent(s)	Votes	Pct	Ballot casts	Majority	Turnout
2008	P035 Kuala Nerus	Mohd Nasir Ibrahim Fikri (UMNO)	26,439	51.30%	M Shukrimun Shamsudin (PAS)	25,098	48.70%	52,539	1,341	85.83%
2013	P035 Kuala Nerus	Mohd Nasir Ibrahim Fikri (UMNO)	33,251	50.45%	Mohd Khairuddin Aman Razali (PAS)	33,861	49.55%	68,036	610	89.24%

== Honours ==
- Malaysia
  - Officer of the Order of the Defender of the Realm (KMN) (2004)
  - Commander of the Order of Meritorious Service (PJN) – Datuk (2010)
- Terengganu
  - Knight Commander of the Order of the Crown of Terengganu (DPMT) – Dato' (2005)
