= Paka (state constituency) =

Political subdivision in Malaysia

Paka (N28)
Terengganu constituency

State constituency
- Legislature: Terengganu State Legislative Assembly
MLA
Satiful Bahri Mamat
PN
- Constituency created: 1973
- First contested: 1974
- Last contested: 2023

Demographics
- Electors (2023): 34,839

N28 Paka within Terengganu, as used for the 2023 state election

Paka is a state constituency in Terengganu, Malaysia, that has been represented in the Terengganu State Legislative Assembly.

The state constituency was first contested in 1974 and is mandated to return a single Assemblyman to the Terengganu State Legislative Assembly under the first-past-the-post voting system.

== Demographics ==
Ethnic breakdown of Paka's electorate as of 2020
1. Malay/Bumiputera (96.8%)
2. Chinese (2.90%)
3. Other ethnicities (0.20%)
4. Indian (0.10%)

== History ==
=== Polling districts ===
According to the Gazette issued on 30 March 2018, the Paka constituency has a total of 13 polling districts.

State Constituency	Polling Districts	Code	Location
Paka (N28)	Kampung Baru Batu Lima	039/28/01	SJK (C) Sin Chone
Paka (N28)	Durain Metangau	039/28/02	SK Durian Metangau
Paka (N28)	Kampung Nyiur	039/28/03	SK Kampung Nyior
Paka (N28)	Tebing Tembah	039/28/04	SK Tebing Tembah
Paka (N28)	Kampung Masjid	039/28/05	SK Paka
Paka (N28)	Limbung	039/28/06	SMK Paka
Paka (N28)	Cacar	039/28/07	SK Seri Paka
Paka (N28)	FELDA Kertih 2	039/28/08	SMK Seri Rasau
Paka (N28)	FELDA Kertih 1	039/28/09	SK Ketengah Jaya II
Paka (N28)	Santung	039/28/10	SK Santung
Paka (N28)	FELDA Kertih 4	039/28/11	SMK Ketengah Jaya
Paka (N28)	Cacar Baru	039/28/12	SK Paka II
Paka (N28)	FELDA Kertih 3	039/28/13	SK FELDA Seri Rasau

=== Representation history ===
Members of the Legislative Assembly for Paka
Assembly	No	Years	Member	Party
Constituency split from Paka-Kerteh
4th	N25	1974–1978	Ismail Haitami Salleh	BN (UMNO)
5th	N25	1978–1982	Ismail Haitami Salleh	BN (UMNO)
6th	N25	1982–1986	Engku Bijaya Sura @ Syed Omar Mohammad	BN (UMNO)
7th	N28	1986–1990	Engku Bijaya Sura @ Syed Omar Mohammad	BN (UMNO)
8th	N28	1990–1995	Engku Bijaya Sura @ Syed Omar Mohammad	BN (UMNO)
9th	N28	1995–1999	Engku Bijaya Sura @ Syed Omar Mohammad	BN (UMNO)
10th	N28	1999–2004	Satiful Bahri Mamat	PAS
11th	N28	2004–2008	Mohd Ariffin Abdullah	BN (UMNO)
12th	N28	2008–2013	Mohd Ariffin Abdullah	BN (UMNO)
13th	N28	2013–2018	Satiful Bahri Mamat	PR (PAS)
14th	N28	2018–2020	Satiful Bahri Mamat	PAS
14th	N28	2020–2023	Satiful Bahri Mamat	PN (PAS)
15th	N28	2023–present	Satiful Bahri Mamat	PN (PAS)

== Election results ==
Terengganu state election, 2023
Party	Candidate	Votes	%	∆%
PAS	Satiful Bahri Mamat	18,681	73.30	▲19.83
BN	Mad Paka @ Ahmad Abdullah Abd Wahab	6,805	26.70	▼11.41
Total valid votes		25,486	100.00	
Total rejected ballots		168		
Unreturned ballots		22		
Turnout		25,676	73.70	▼11.52
Registered electors		34,839		
Majority		11,876	46.60	▲31.24
PAS hold		Swing		
Source(s) Astro Awani

Terengganu state election, 2018
Party	Candidate	Votes	%	∆%
PAS	Satiful Bahari Mamat	11,853	53.47	▲0.67
BN	Tengku Hamzah Tengku Draman	8,448	38.11	▼9.09
PKR	Mohd Hasbie Muda	1,866	8.42	▲8.42
Total valid votes		22,167	100.00	
Total rejected ballots		237		
Unreturned ballots		123		
Turnout		22,527	85.22	▼2.56
Registered electors		26,433		
Majority		3,405	15.36	▲9.76
PAS hold		Swing		

Terengganu state election, 2013
Party	Candidate	Votes	%	∆%
PAS	Satiful Bahari Mamat	12,138	52.80	▲3.80
BN	Matulidi Jusoh	10,851	47.20	▼3.80
Total valid votes		22,989	100.00	
Total rejected ballots		202		
Unreturned ballots		40		
Turnout		23,231	87.78	▲3.42
Registered electors		26,464		
Majority		1,287	5.60	▲3.61
PAS gain from BN		Swing		-

Terengganu state election, 2008
Party	Candidate	Votes	%	∆%
BN	Mohd AriffinA bdullah	8,806	51.00	▼3.69
PAS	Satiful Bahari Mamat	8,462	49.00	▲3.69
Total valid votes		17,268	100.00	
Total rejected ballots		187		
Unreturned ballots		16		
Turnout		17,471	84.36	▼3.80
Registered electors		20,709		
Majority		344	1.99	▼7.37
BN hold		Swing		

Terengganu state election, 2004
Party	Candidate	Votes	%	∆%
BN	Mohd Ariffin Abdullah	8,433	54.68	▲17.20
PAS	Satiful Bahari Mamat	6,989	45.32	▼17.20
Total valid votes		15,422	100.00	
Total rejected ballots		148		
Unreturned ballots		34		
Turnout		15,604	88.17	▲3.64
Registered electors		17,698		
Majority		1,444	9.36	▼15.68
BN gain from PAS		Swing		-

Terengganu state election, 1999
Party	Candidate	Votes	%	∆%
PAS	Satiful Bahari Mamat	6,706	62.52	▲62.52
BN	Rosli Mat Hassan	4,020	37.48	▼14.23
Total valid votes		10,726	100.00	
Total rejected ballots		222		
Unreturned ballots		1		
Turnout		10,949	84.53	▲0.02
Registered electors		12,953		
Majority		2,686	25.04	▲21.63
PAS gain from BN		Swing		-

Terengganu state election, 1995
Party	Candidate	Votes	%	∆%
BN	Syed Omar Mohammad	4,817	51.71	▼5.41
PAS	Sulong Mahmood	4,499	48.29	▲5.41
Total valid votes		9,316	100.00	
Total rejected ballots		212		
Unreturned ballots		8		
Turnout		9,536	84.51	▲1.54
Registered electors		11,284		
Majority		318	3.41	▼10.82
BN hold		Swing		

Terengganu state election, 1990
Party	Candidate	Votes	%	∆%
BN	Syed Omar Mohammad	5,557	57.12	▼3.71
PAS	Ismail HaitamiSalleh	4,172	42.88	▲42.88
Total valid votes		9,729	100.00	
Total rejected ballots		341		
Unreturned ballots		9		
Turnout		10,079	82.97	▲3.77
Registered electors		12,148		
Majority		1,385	14.24	▼7.41
BN hold		Swing		

Terengganu state election, 1986
Party	Candidate	Votes	%	∆%
BN	Syed Omar Mohammad (Engku Bijaya Sura)	4,467	60.83	▲2.42
PAS	Yahaya Ali	2,877	39.17	▼2.42
Total valid votes		7,344	100.00	
Total rejected ballots		281		
Unreturned ballots		0		
Turnout		7,625	79.20	▼0.62
Registered electors		9,628		
Majority		1,590	21.65	▲4.84
BN hold		Swing		

Terengganu state election, 1982
Party	Candidate	Votes	%	∆%
BN	Syed Omar Mohammad (Engku Bijaya Sura)	3,419	58.40	▲9.86
PAS	Abdullah Mohamad	2,435	41.60	▲5.59
Total valid votes		5,854	100.00	
Total rejected ballots		240		
Unreturned ballots		0		
Turnout		6,094	79.82	▲4.21
Registered electors		7,635		
Majority		984	16.81	▲4.28
BN hold		Swing		

Terengganu state election, 1978
Party	Candidate	Votes	%	∆%
BN	Ismail Haitami Salleh	2,045	48.54	▼11.10
PAS	Abdullah Mohamad	1,517	36.01	▲36.01
Parti Sosialis Rakyat Malaysia	Shaikh Ahmad Shaikh Ali	651	15.45	▼24.91
Total valid votes		4,213	100.00	
Total rejected ballots		310		
Unreturned ballots		0		
Turnout		4,523	75.61	▲1.88
Registered electors		5,982		
Majority		528	12.53	▼6.75
BN hold		Swing		

Terengganu state election, 1974
Party	Candidate	Votes	%
BN	Ismail Haitami Salleh	2,184	59.64
Parti Sosialis Rakyat Malaysia	Shaikh Ahmad Shaikh Ali	1,478	40.36
Total valid votes		3,662	100.00
Total rejected ballots		375	
Unreturned ballots		0	
Turnout		4,037	73.74
Registered electors		5,475	
Majority		706	19.28
This was a new constituency created.
