= Sura (state constituency) =

Political subdivision in Malaysia

Sura (N27)
Terengganu constituency

State constituency
- Legislature: Terengganu State Legislative Assembly
MLA
Tengku Muhammad Fakhruddin Tengku Md Fauzi
PN
- Constituency created: 1959
- First contested: 1959
- Last contested: 2023

Demographics
- Electors (2023): 30,206

N27 Sura within Terengganu, as used for the 2023 state election

Sura is a state constituency in Terengganu, Malaysia, that has been represented in the Terengganu State Legislative Assembly.

The state constituency was first contested in 1959 and is mandated to return a single Assemblyman to the Terengganu State Legislative Assembly under the first-past-the-post voting system.

== Demographics ==
Ethnic breakdown of Sura's electorate as of 2018
1. Malay (92.8%)
2. Chinese (6.68%)
3. Indian (0.36%)
4. Other ethnicities (0.17%)

== History ==
=== Polling districts ===
According to the Gazette issued on 30 March 2018, the Sura constituency has a total of 12 polling districts.

State Constituency	Polling Districts	Code	Location
Sura (N27)	Sungai Penaga	039/27/01	SJK (C) Kwang Hwa
Sura (N27)	Sungai Buaya	039/27/02	SMA Sultan Ismail
Sura (N27)	Nibung	039/27/03	SMA Sultan Ismail
Sura (N27)	Bukit Catak	039/27/04	SMK Kompleks Padang Jambu
Sura (N27)	Alur Tembesu	039/27/05	SK Sultan Omar
Sura (N27)	Kampung Molek	039/27/06	SK Kuala Dungun
Sura (N27)	Tanah Lot	039/27/07	SK Bandar Dungun
Sura (N27)	Teluk Lipat	039/27/08	SMK Sultan Omar
Sura (N27)	Sura Gate	039/27/09	SK Batu 48
Sura (N27)	Sura Utara	039/27/10	SM IMTIAZ Yayasan Terengganu Dungun
Sura (N27)	Padang Jambu	039/27/11	SK Pusat Dungun
Sura (N27)	Sura Tengah	039/27/12	SMK Sura; SK Sura

=== Representation history ===
Members of the Legislative Assembly for Sura
Assembly	No	Years	Member	Party
Constituency created
1st	N15	1959–1964	Abu Bakar Mohamed Salleh	PMIP
2nd	N15	1964–1969	Wan Din Embong	Alliance (UMNO)
		1969–1971	Assembly dissolved	
3rd	N15	1971–1973	Ibrahim Mohamed Noh	PMIP
3rd	N15	1973-1974	Ibrahim Mohamed Noh	BN (PMIP)
4th	N23	1974–1978	Omar Shukri Embong	BN (PAS)
5th	N23	1978–1982	Mustaffa Abdul Majeed	BN (UMNO)
6th	N23	1982–1986	Othman Omar	BN (UMNO)
7th	N27	1986–1990	Abdul Aziz @ Ibrahim Awang	BN (UMNO)
8th	N27	1990–1995	Abdul Aziz @ Ibrahim Awang	BN (UMNO)
9th	N27	1995–1999	Abdul Aziz @ Ibrahim Awang	BN (UMNO)
10th	N27	1999–2004	Wan Hassan Mohd Ramli	PAS
11th	N27	2004–2008	Ahmad Kamal Abdullah	BN (UMNO)
12th	N27	2008–2013	Wan Hassan Mohd Ramli	PR (PAS)
13th	N27	2013–2018	Wan Hapandi Wan Nik	PR (PAS)
14th	N27	2018–2020	Wan Hapandi Wan Nik	PAS
14th	N27	2020–2023	Wan Hapandi Wan Nik	PN (PAS)
15th	N27	2023–present	Tengku Muhammad Fakhruddin Tengku Md Fauzi	PN (PAS)

== Election results ==
Terengganu state election, 2023
Party	Candidate	Votes	%	∆%
PAS	Tengku Muhammad Fakhruddin Tengku Md Fauzi	17,395	83.06	▲21.25
PH	Othman Umar	3,547	16.94	▲16.94
Total valid votes		20,942	100.00	
Total rejected ballots		146		
Unreturned ballots		23		
Turnout		21,111	69.89	▼13.02
Registered electors		30,206		
Majority		13,848	66.13	▲30.71
PAS hold		Swing		

Terengganu state election, 2018
Party	Candidate	Votes	%	∆%
PAS	Wan Hapandi Wan Nik	12,500	61.81	▲1.92
BN	Zainun binti Abu Bakar	5,338	26.39	▼13.71
PKR	Zulkifli Ali	2,386	11.80	▲11.80
Total valid votes		20,224	100.00	
Total rejected ballots		206		
Unreturned ballots		100		
Turnout		20,530	82.91	▼2.52
Registered electors		24,761		
Majority		7,162	35.41	▲15.63
PAS hold		Swing		

Terengganu state election, 2013
Party	Candidate	Votes	%	∆%
PAS	Wan Hapandi Wan Nik	8,952	59.89	▲6.05
BN	Zakariah Ali	5,995	40.11	▼6.05
Total valid votes		14,947	100.00	
Total rejected ballots		141		
Unreturned ballots		38		
Turnout		15,126	85.43	▲3.79
Registered electors		17,705		
Majority		2,957	19.78	▲12.09
PAS hold		Swing		

Terengganu state election, 2008
Party	Candidate	Votes	%	∆%
PAS	Wan Hassan Mohd Ramli	7,000	53.85	▲4.53
BN	Mohd Rosli Harun	6,000	46.15	▼4.53
Total valid votes		13,000	100.00	
Total rejected ballots		128		
Unreturned ballots		35		
Turnout		13,163	81.64	▼2.65
Registered electors		16,123		
Majority		1,000	7.69	▲6.32
PAS gain from BN		Swing		-

Terengganu state election, 2004
Party	Candidate	Votes	%	∆%
BN	Ahmad Kamal Abdullah	6,224	50.69	▲16.38
PAS	Wan Hassan Mohd Ramli	6,055	49.31	▼16.38
Total valid votes		12,279	100.00	
Total rejected ballots		134		
Unreturned ballots		26		
Turnout		12,439	84.29	▲6.26
Registered electors		14,757		
Majority		169	1.38	▼30.00
BN gain from PAS		Swing		-

Terengganu state election, 1999
Party	Candidate	Votes	%	∆%
PAS	Wan Hassan Mohd Ramli	6,643	65.69	
BN	Za'abar Mohd Adib	3,470	34.31	
Total valid votes		10,113	100.00	
Total rejected ballots		187		
Unreturned ballots		0		
Turnout		10,300	78.03	▲78.03
Registered electors		13,200		
Majority		3,173	31.38	▲31.38
PAS gain from BN		Swing		-

Terengganu state election, 1995
Party	Candidate	Votes	%	∆%
On the nomination day, Ibrahim Awang won uncontested.
BN	Ibrahim Awang			
Total valid votes				
Total rejected ballots				
Unreturned ballots				
Turnout				
Registered electors		12,916		
Majority				
BN hold		Swing		

Terengganu state election, 1990
Party	Candidate	Votes	%	∆%
BN	Ibrahim Awang	5,350	55.41	▼0.78
PAS	Mustafa Ali	4,305	44.59	▲0.78
Total valid votes		9,655	100.00	
Total rejected ballots		305		
Unreturned ballots		30		
Turnout		9,990	77.89	▲5.81
Registered electors		12,826		
Majority		1,045	10.82	▼1.55
BN hold		Swing		

Terengganu state election, 1986
Party	Candidate	Votes	%	∆%
BN	Ibrahim Awang	4,245	56.19	▼1.64
PAS	Wan Omar Shukri Embong	3,310	43.81	▲3.51
Total valid votes		7,555	100.00	
Total rejected ballots		249		
Unreturned ballots		0		
Turnout		7,804	72.08	▼1.94
Registered electors		10,827		
Majority		935	12.38	▼5.15
BN hold		Swing		

Terengganu state election, 1982
Party	Candidate	Votes	%	∆%
BN	Othman Omar	4,111	57.83	▲12.29
PAS	Wan Omar Shukri Embong	2,865	40.30	▼5.09
Parti Sosialis Rakyat Malaysia	Mohamad Zaid @ Mohamad Long	133	1.87	▼7.20
Total valid votes		7,109	100.00	
Total rejected ballots		134		
Unreturned ballots		0		
Turnout		7,243	74.02	▲4.61
Registered electors		9,785		
Majority		1,246	17.53	▲17.38
BN hold		Swing		

Terengganu state election, 1978
Party	Candidate	Votes	%	∆%
BN	Mustapha Abd.Majeed	2,440	45.54	▲45.54
PAS	Wan Omar Shukri Embong	2,432	45.39	▼19.62
Parti Sosialis Rakyat Malaysia	Abdul Malek Abdullah	486	9.07	▼25.92
Total valid votes		5,358	100.00	
Total rejected ballots		379		
Unreturned ballots		0		
Turnout		5,737	69.41	▲5.19
Registered electors		8,265		
Majority		8	0.15	▼29.88
BN hold		Swing		

Terengganu state election, 1974
Party	Candidate	Votes	%	∆%
BN	Wan Omar Shukri Embong	2,988	65.01	▲8.12
Parti Sosialis Rakyat Malaysia	Yusoff Embong	1,608	34.99	▲34.99
Total valid votes		4,596	100.00	
Total rejected ballots		412		
Unreturned ballots		0		
Turnout		5,008	64.22	▼6.10
Registered electors		7,798		
Majority		1,380	30.03	▲16.23
BN gain from PAS		Swing		-

Terengganu state election, 1969
Party	Candidate	Votes	%	∆%
PMIP	Ibrahim Mat Noh	2,068	51.01	▲11.71
Alliance	Wan Din Embong	1,986	48.99	▼0.52
Total valid votes		4,054	100.00	
Total rejected ballots		311		
Unreturned ballots		0		
Turnout		4,365	75.05	▲1.61
Registered electors		5,816		
Majority		82	2.02	▼8.19
PMIP gain from Alliance		Swing		-

Terengganu state election, 1964
Party	Candidate	Votes	%	∆%
Alliance	Wan Din Embong	1,853	49.51	▲10.93
PMIP	Wan Omar Shukri Embong	1,471	39.30	▼2.70
Socialist Front	Muhamad Ibrahim	270	7.21	▲0.45
National Party	Syed Ali Mohsin	149	3.98	▼8.68
Total valid votes		3,743	100.00	
Total rejected ballots		155		
Unreturned ballots		0		
Turnout		3,898	73.44	▲6.38
Registered electors		5,308		
Majority		382	10.21	▲6.79
Alliance gain from PMIP		Swing		-

Terengganu state election, 1959
Party	Candidate	Votes	%
PMIP	Abu Bakar Mohamed Salleh	1,423	42.00
Alliance	Wan Din Embong	1,307	38.58
National Party	Muda Mohd. Amin	429	12.66
Socialist Front	Abdul Malik Mohamed Ali	229	6.76
Total valid votes		3,388	100.00
Total rejected ballots		57	
Unreturned ballots		0	
Turnout		3,445	67.06
Registered electors		5,137	
Majority		116	3.42
This was a new constituency created.
