= Wan Hassan Mohd Ramli =

Malaysian politician

Yang Berhormat Dato' Wan Hassan Mohd Ramli DPMT JMN SMT PJC JP MP
- وان حسن محمد رملي

Exco roles (Terengganu)
- 1999–2004: Chairman of the Youth, Sports, Culture and Tourism

Faction represented in Dewan Rakyat
- 2013–2020: Malaysian Islamic Party
- 2020–: Perikatan Nasional

Faction represented in Terengganu State Legislative Assembly
- 1999–2004: Malaysian Islamic Party
- 2008–2013: Malaysian Islamic Party

Other roles
- 2020–2022: Chairman of National Water Service Commission (SPAN)

Personal details
- Born: Wan Hassan bin Mohd Ramli; 17 July 1957 (age 69) Kampung Lubuk Bongor, Kuala Krai, Kelantan, Malaysia
- Citizenship: Malaysian
- Party: Malaysian Islamic Party (PAS)
- Other political affiliations: Barisan Alternatif (BA) (1999-2004); Pakatan Rakyat (PR) (2008-2015); Gagasan Sejahtera (GS) (2016–present); Perikatan Nasional (PN) (2020-present); Muafakat Nasional (MN) (2019-present)
- Occupation: Politician

Wan Hassan bin Mohd Ramli (Jawi وان حسن محمد رملي; is a Malaysian politician who has served as the Member of Parliament (MP) for Dungun since May 2013. He served as Member of the Terengganu State Executive Council (EXCO), Member of the Terengganu State Legislative Assembly (MLA) for Sura from November 1999 to March 2004 and again from March 2008 to May 2013 as well as Chairman of the National Water Service Commission (SPAN).

== Education background ==
- Jerangau Sungai Primary School, 1963
- Dungun Men's Primary School
- Dungun English Secondary School (now Sultan Omar Secondary School)

== Election results ==
Terengganu State Legislative Assembly
Year	Constituency	Candidate	Votes	Pct	Opponent(s)	Votes	Pct	Ballots cast	Majority	Turnout
1999	N27 Sura	Wan Hassan Mohd Ramli (PAS)	6,643	65.69%	Za'abar Mohd Adib (UMNO)	3,470	34.31%	10,300	3,173	78.03%
2004	N27 Sura	Wan Hassan Mohd Ramli (PAS)	6,055	49.31%	Ahmad Kamal Abdullah (UMNO)	6,224	50.69%	12,439	168	84.29%
2008	N27 Sura	Wan Hassan Mohd Ramli (PAS)	7,000	53.85%	Mohd Rosli Harun (UMNO)	6,000	46.15%	13,163	1,000	81.64%

Parliament of Malaysia
Year	Constituency	Candidate	Votes	Pct	Opponent(s)	Votes	Pct	Ballots cast	Majority	Turnout
2013	P039 Dungun	Wan Hassan Mohd Ramli (PAS)	35,347	52.65%	Rosli Mat Hassan (UMNO)	31,406	46.78%	68,204	3,942	87.25%
2013	P039 Dungun	Wan Hassan Mohd Ramli (PAS)	35,347	52.65%	Abdullah Mohamed (IND)	384	0.57%	68,204	3,942	87.25%
2018	P039 Dungun	Wan Hassan Mohd Ramli (PAS)	40,850	54.17%	Din Adam (UMNO)	27,731	36.77%	76,706	13,119	84.75%
2018	P039 Dungun	Wan Hassan Mohd Ramli (PAS)	40,850	54.17%	Abd Rahman Yusof (PKR)	6,833	9.06%	76,706	13,119	84.75%
2022	P039 Dungun	Wan Hassan Mohd Ramli (PAS)	59,720	65.43%	Norhisham Johari (UMNO)	25,615	28.07%	91,269	34,105	78.98%
2022	P039 Dungun	Wan Hassan Mohd Ramli (PAS)	59,720	65.43%	Mohasdjone @ Mohd Johari Mohamad (PKR)	5,307	5.81%	91,269	34,105	78.98%
2022	P039 Dungun	Wan Hassan Mohd Ramli (PAS)	59,720	65.43%	Nur Aishah Hassan (PEJUANG)	322	0.35%	91,269	34,105	78.98%
2022	P039 Dungun	Wan Hassan Mohd Ramli (PAS)	59,720	65.43%	Ghazali Ismail (IND)	305	0.33%	91,269	34,105	78.98%

== Honours ==
=== Honours of Malaysia ===
- Malaysia
  - Companion of the Order of the Defender of the Realm (JMN) (2021)
  - Recipient of the 17th Yang di-Pertuan Agong Installation Medal (2024)
- Terengganu
  - Knight Commander of the Order of the Crown of Terengganu (DPMT) – Dato' (2026)
  - Companion of the Order of the Crown of Terengganu (SMT) (2022)
  - Recipient of the Distinguished Service Medal (PJC) (2002)
  - Justice of the Peace (JP) (2003)
