= Members of the Dewan Rakyat, 15th Malaysian Parliament =

15th Parliament of Malaysia
←	14th Parliament	16th Parliament	→

Overview
- Legislative body: Parliament of Malaysia
- Jurisdiction: Malaysia
- Meeting place: Malaysian Houses of Parliament
- Term: 19 December 2022 – present
- Election: 2022 general election
- Government: Anwar Ibrahim cabinet
- Website: www.parlimen.gov.my

Dewan Rakyat
- Members: 222
- Speaker: Johari Abdul
- Deputy Speaker: Ramli Mohd Nor; Alice Lau Kiong Yieng
- Secretary: Nizam Mydin Bacha Mydin
- Prime Minister: Anwar Ibrahim
- Leader of the Opposition: Hamzah Zainudin; Ahmad Samsuri Mokhtar
- Party control: Pakatan Harapan

Sovereign
- Yang di-Pertuan Agong: Al-Sultan Abdullah Ri'ayatuddin Al-Mustafa Billah Shah (until 31 January 2024); Sultan Ibrahim

Sessions
- 1st: 1st Meeting : 19 December 2022 – 20 December 2022
- 2nd: 1st Meeting : 13 February 2023 – 4 April 2023; 2nd Meeting : 22 May 2023 – 15 June 2023; Special Meeting: 11 September 2023 – 19 September 2023; 3rd Meeting : 9 October 2023 – 30 November 2023
- 3rd: 1st Meeting : 26 February 2024 – 27 March 2024; 2nd Meeting : 24 June 2024 – 18 July 2024; 3rd Meeting : 14 October 2024 – 12 December 2024
- 4th: 1st Meeting : 3 February 2025 – 6 March 2025; Special Meeting: 5 May 2025; 2nd Meeting : 21 July 2025 – 28 August 2025; 3rd Meeting : 6 October 2025 – 4 December 2025
- 5th: 1st Meeting : 19 January 2026 – 3 March 2026; 2nd Meeting : 22 June 2026 – 16 July 2026; Special Meeting: 11 August 2026; 3rd Meeting : 5 October 2026 – 8 December 2026

This is a list of the members of the Dewan Rakyat (House of Representatives) of the 15th Parliament of Malaysia, elected in the 2022 general election.

== Compositions ==
=== Outcomes of the 15th general election ===

Beginning of the 15th Parliament of Malaysia 19 December 2022
State and federal territories	# of seats	PH seats	PN seats	BN seats	GPS seats	GRS seats	WARISAN seats	KDM seats	PBM seats	MUDA seats	Others seats
Perlis	3	0	3	0	0	0	0	0	0	0	0
Kedah	15	1	14	0	0	0	0	0	0	0	0
Kelantan	14	0	14	0	0	0	0	0	0	0	0
Terengganu	8	0	8	0	0	0	0	0	0	0	0
Penang	13	10	3	0	0	0	0	0	0	0	0
Perak	24	11	10	3	0	0	0	0	0	0	0
Pahang	14	2	7	5	0	0	0	0	0	0	0
Selangor	22	16	6	0	0	0	0	0	0	0	0
Kuala Lumpur	11	10	0	1	0	0	0	0	0	0	0
Putrajaya	1	0	1	0	0	0	0	0	0	0	0
Negeri Sembilan	8	3	0	5	0	0	0	0	0	0	0
Malacca	6	3	3	0	0	0	0	0	0	0	0
Johor	26	14	2	9	0	0	0	0	0	1	0
Labuan	1	0	1	0	0	0	0	0	0	0	0
Sabah	25	5	1	7	0	6	3	2	0	0	List: Independent (1)
Sarawak	31	6	1	0	23	0	0	0	1	0	0
Total	222	81	74	30	23	6	3	2	1	1	1

Government (143)																			Confidence & Supply (13)			Opposition (62)			Vacant (4)
PH			BN				GPS				GRS			WARISAN	KDM	STAR	PBM	IND	BERSATU	IND	MUDA	PN			VAC
75			30				23				7			3	2	1	1	1	6	6	1	62			4
40	27	8	26	2	1	1	14	5	2	2	4	2	1	3	2	1	1	1	6	6	1	43	13	6	4
DAP	PKR	AMANAH	UMNO	MCA	MIC	PBRS	PBB	PRS	PDP	SUPP	Direct	UPKO	PBS	WARISAN	KDM	STAR	PBM	IND	BERSATU	IND	MUDA	PAS	BERSATU	WAWASAN	VAC

=== Last election pendulum ===
The 15th General Election witnessed 148 governmental seats and 74 non-governmental seats filled the Dewan Rakyat. The government side has 43 safe seats and 9 fairly safe seats, while the other side has 21 safe seats and 10 fairly safe seats.

GOVERNMENT SEATS
Marginal
Lubok Antu	Roy Angau Gingkoi	PRS	34.44
Tenom	Riduan Rubin	IND	35.00
Kuala Selangor	Dzulkefly Ahmad	AMANAH	35.88
Tanjong Malim	Chang Lih Kang	PKR	36.08
Beaufort	Siti Aminah Aching	UMNO	36.08
Kudat	Verdon Bahanda	IND	36.19
Muar	Syed Saddiq Syed Abdul Rahman	MUDA	37.55
Bentong	Young Syefura Othman	DAP	37.62
Sri Gading	Aminolhuda Hassan	AMANAH	37.94
Tampin	Mohd Isam Mohd Isa	UMNO	38.15
Raub	Chow Yu Hui	DAP	38.43
Balik Pulau	Muhammad Bakhtiar Wan Chik	PKR	38.43
Sepanggar	Mustapha Sakmud	PKR	38.44
Alor Gajah	Adly Zahari	AMAHAH	38.60
Sungai Petani	Mohd Taufiq Johari	PKR	38.91
Tawau	Lo Su Fui	PBS	39.19
Sekijang	Zaliha Mustafa	PKR	39.27
Sungai Buloh	Ramanan Ramakrishnan	PKR	39.30
Putatan	Shahelmey Yahaya	UMNO	39.36
Bagan Datuk	Ahmad Zahid Hamidi	UMNO	39.61
Tambun	Anwar Ibrahim	PKR	39.77
Ayer Hitam	Wee Ka Siong	MCA	40.50
Julau	Larry Sng Wei Shien	PBM	40.64
Sepang	Aiman Athirah	AMANAH	40.78
Pontian	Ahmad Maslan	UMNO	40.81
Parit Sulong	Noraini Ahmad	UMNO	40.89
Kanowit	Aaron Ago Dagang	PRS	41.07
Titiwangsa	Johari Abdul Ghani	UMNO	41.15
Tenggara	Manndzri Nasib	UMNO	41.26
Tapah	Saravanan Murugan	MIC	41.36
Simpang Renggam	Hasni Mohammad	UMNO	41.49
Hang Tuah Jaya	Adam Adli Abdul Halim	PKR	41.72
Kimanis	Mohamad Alamin	UMNO	41.86
Sungai Siput	Kesavan Subramaniam	PKR	41.89
Ledang	Syed Ibrahim Syed Noh	PKR	41.90
Jempol	Shamsulkahar Mohd Deli	UMNO	41.98
Keningau	Jeffrey Kitingan	STAR	42.20
Hulu Langat	Mohd Sany Hamzan	AMANAH	42.68
Tuaran	Wilfred Madius Tangau	UPKO	42.84
Tanjung Piai	Wee Jeck Seng	MCA	43.22
Paya Besar	Mohd Shahar Abdullah	UMNO	43.40
Gombak	Amirudin Shari	PKR	43.69
Kuala Pilah	Adnan Abu Hassan	UMNO	44.02
Sri Aman	Doris Sophia Brodie	PRS	44.27
Batu Sapi	Khairul Firdaus Akbar Khan	BERSATU Sabah	44.95
Shah Alam	Azli Yusof	AMANAH	45.23
Batu Pahat	Onn Abu Bakar	PKR	45.47
Lenggong	Shamsul Anuar Nasarah	UMNO	45.48
Johor Bahru	Akmal Nasrullah Mohd Nasir	PKR	45.82
Setiawangsa	Nik Nazmi Nik Ahmad	PKR	46.06
Lembah Pantai	Ahmad Fahmi Mohamed Fadzli	PKR	46.09
Segamat	Yuneswaran Ramaraj	PKR	46.27
Labis	Pang Hok Liong	DAP	46.43
Kota Belud	Isnaraissah Munirah Majilis	WARISAN	46.54
Lahad Datu	Mohammad Yusof Apdal	WARISAN	46.64
Bandar Tun Razak	Wan Azizah Wan Ismail	PKR	46.74
Sibu	Oscar Ling Chai Yew	DAP	47.45
Kalabakan	Andi Muhammad Suryady Bandy	UMNO	47.68
Pasir Gudang	Hassan Abdul Karim	PKR	47.72
Jelebu	Jalaluddin Alias	UMNO	48.10
Cameron Highlands	Ramli Mohd Nor	UMNO	48.46
Rembau	Mohamad Hasan	UMNO	48.50
Kota Marudu	Wetrom Bahanda	KDM	48.69
Lipis	Abdul Rahman Mohamad	UMNO	49.29
Wangsa Maju	Zahir Hassan	PKR	49.63
Sipitang	Matbali Musah	BERSATU Sabah	49.75
Tebrau	Jimmy Puah Wee Tse	PKR	49.99
Bakri	Tan Hong Pin	DAP	50.09
Selayang	William Leong Jee Keen	PKR	50.23
Miri	Chiew Choon Man	PKR	50.61
Pekan	Sh Mohmed Puzi Sh Ali	UMNO	50.96
Teluk Intan	Nga Kor Ming	DAP	51.61
Kampar	Chong Zhemin	DAP	51.30
Libaran	Suhaimi Nasir	UMNO	51.58
Seremban	Anthony Loke Siew Fook	DAP	51.84
Pengerang	Azalina Othman Said	UMNO	51.96
Papar	Armizan Mohd Ali	BERSATU Sabah	51.99
Kluang	Wong Shu Qi	DAP	52.08
Port Dickson	Aminuddin Harun	PKR	52.40
Batu	Prabakaran Parameswaran	PKR	52.46
Pensiangan	Arthur Joseph Kurup	PBRS	52.88
Nibong Tebal	Fadhlina Sidek	PKR	53.20
Stampin	Chong Chieng Jen	DAP	53.30
Bera	Ismail Sabri Yaakob	UMNO	53.34
Ranau	Jonathan Yasin	BERSATU Sabah	53.44
Kota Tinggi	Mohamed Khaled Nordin	UMNO	53.68
Gopeng	Tan Kar Hing	PKR	53.92
Sandakan	Vivian Wong Shir Yee	DAP	53.92
Ampang	Rodziah Ismail	PKR	54.35
Mas Gading	Mordi Bimol	DAP	55.05
Sarikei	Huang Tiong Sii	SUPP	55.07
Sembrong	Hishammuddin Hussein	UMNO	55.15
Pulai	Salahuddin Ayub	AMANAH	55.33
Taiping	Wong Kah Woh	DAP	55.56
Selangau	Edwin Banta	PRS	55.83
Fairly safe
Kulai	Teo Nie Ching	DAP	56.86
Lanang	Alice Lau Kiong Yieng	DAP	56.89
Petaling Jaya	Lee Chean Chung	PKR	57.12
Serian	Richard Riot Jaem	SUPP	57.23
Penampang	Ewon Benedick	UPKO	57.30
Kinabatangan	Bung Moktar Radin	UMNO	57.38
Puncak Borneo	Willie Mongin	PBB	57.58
Bangi	Syahredzan Johan	DAP	57.95
Iskandar Puteri	Liew Chin Tong	DAP	59.15
Safe
Kota Melaka	Khoo Poay Tiong	DAP	60.07
Bayan Baru	Sim Tze Tzin	PKR	61.54
Betong	Richard Rapu Amaan Begri	PBB	61.69
Bintulu	Tiong King Sing	PDP	61.73
Baram	Anyi Ngau	PDP	61.78
Kota Raja	Mohamad Sabu	AMANAH	62.36
Lawas	Henry Sum Agong	PBB	62.40
Pandan	Mohd Rafizi Ramli	PKR	63.98
Beruas	Ngeh Koo Ham	DAP	64.72
Sibuti	Lukanisman Awang Sauni	PBB	65.31
Puchong	Yeo Bee Yin	DAP	65.67
Hulu Rajang	Wilson Ugak Kumbaong	PRS	66.03
Rasah	Cha Kee Chin	DAP	68.04
Klang	Ganabatirau Veraman	DAP	70.49
Kota Kinabalu	Chan Foong Hin	DAP	71.08
Batang Lupar	Mohamad Shafizan Kepli	PBB	71.22
Jelutong	Sanisvara Nethaji Rayer Rajaji	DAP	71.24
Bandar Kuching	Kelvin Yii Lee Wuen	DAP	71.34
Ipoh Timor	Howard Lee Chuan How	DAP	72.13
Batu Kawan	Chow Kon Yeow	DAP	73.72
Semporna	Mohammad Shafie Apdal	WARISAN	73.77
Kapit	Alexander Nanta Linggi	PBB	75.10
Limbang	Hasbi Habibollah	PBB	75.25
Kota Samarahan	Rubiah Wang	PBB	76.71
Bukit Mertajam	Steven Sim Chee Keong	DAP	77.33
Subang	Wong Chen	PKR	77.68
Mukah	Hanifah Hajar Taib	PBB	78.23
Bukit Bendera	Syerleena Abdul Rashid	DAP	78.98
Petra Jaya	Fadillah Yusof	PBB	79.15
Segambut	Hannah Yeoh Tseow Suan	DAP	80.05
Bagan	Lim Guan Eng	DAP	81.27
Batu Gajah	Sivakumar Varatharaju Naidu	DAP	81.38
Ipoh Barat	Kulasegaran Murugeson	DAP	81.57
Damansara	Gobind Singh Deo	DAP	81.67
Bukit Gelugor	Ramkarpal Singh	DAP	82.73
Bukit Bintang	Fong Kui Lun	DAP	82.79
Batang Sadong	Rodiyah Sapiee	PBB	83.18
Seputeh	Teresa Kok Suh Sim	DAP	83.74
Cheras	Tan Kok Wai	DAP	84.04
Santubong	Nancy Shukri	PBB	84.42
Tanjong	Lim Hui Ying	DAP	84.83
Tanjong Manis	Yusuf Abd Wahab	PBB	86.52
Kepong	Lim Lip Eng	DAP	88.92
Igan	Ahmad Johnie Zawawi	PBB	93.16

NON-GOVERNMENT SEATS
Marginal
Labuan	Suhaili Abd Rahman	BERSATU	28.56
Tanjong Karang	Zulkafperi Hanapi	BERSATU	35.26
Lumut	Nordin Ahmad Ismail	BERSATU	35.43
Jasin	Zulkifli Ismail	PAS	35.95
Temerloh	Salamiah Mohd Nor	PAS	37.43
Hulu Selangor	Mohd Hasnizan Harun	PAS	38.24
Beluran	Ronald Kiandee	BERSATU	38.53
Sungai Besar	Muslimin Yahaya	BERSATU	38.75
Kuala Kangsar	Iskandar Dzulkarnain	BERSATU	40.27
Tangga Batu	Bakri Jamaluddin	PAS	40.65
Kepala Batas	Siti Mastura Muhammad	PAS	41.27
Kapar	Halimah Ali	PAS	41.61
Kuala Langat	Ahmad Yunus Hairi	PAS	42.68
Permatang Pauh	Muhammad Fawwaz Mohamad Jan	PAS	43.04
Padang Rengas	Azahari Hasan	BERSATU	43.28
Gerik	Fathul Huzir Ayob	PAS	43.64
Pasir Salak	Jamaludin Yahya	PAS	43.66
Putrajaya	Mohd Radzi Mohd Jidin	BERSATU	43.67
Kangar	Zakri Hassan	BERSATU	43.70
Sabak Bernam	Kalam Salan	BERSATU	43.86
Parit Buntar	Mohd Misbahul Munir Masduki	PAS	43.90
Mersing	Muhammad Islahuddin Abas	BERSATU	44.91
Gua Musang	Mohd Azizi Abu Naim	BERSATU	45.12
Bukit Gantang	Syed Abu Hussin Syed Abdul Fasal	BERSATU	45.59
Parit	Muhammad Ismi Mat Taib	PAS	45.76
Pagoh	Muhyiddin Md Yasin	BERSATU	45.94
Tasek Gelugor	Wan Saifulruddin Wan Jan	BERSATU	46.36
Masjid Tanah	Mas Ermieyati Samsudin	BERSATU	46.77
Kuala Krau	Kamal Ashaari	PAS	47.13
Rompin	Abdul Khalib Abdullah	BERSATU	47.20
Maran	Ismail Abd Muttalib	PAS	47.70
Jerantut	Khairil Nizam Khirudin	PAS	47.49
Alor Setar	Afnan Hamimi Taib Azamuddin	PAS	48.69
Kulim-Bandar Baharu	Roslan Hashim	BERSATU	49.00
Merbok	Mohd Nazri Abu Hassan	BERSATU	51.27
Padang Besar	Rusydan Rusmi	PAS	53.58
Langkawi	Mohd Suhaimi Abdullah	BERSATU	53.63
Kota Bharu	Takiyuddin Hassan	PAS	53.67
Bagan Serai	Idris Ahmad	PAS	53.98
Larut	Hamzah Zainudin	BERSATU	54.65
Machang	Wan Ahmad Fayhsal Wan Ahmad Kamal	BERSATU	54.68
Fairly safe
Kuala Kedah	Ahmad Fakhruddin Fakhrurazi	PAS	56.03
Padang Serai	Azman Nasrudin	BERSATU	56.49
Kubang Pasu	Ku Abd Rahman Ku Ismail	BERSATU	57.05
Padang Terap	Nurul Amin Hamid	PAS	58.03
Besut	Che Mohamad Zulkifly Jusoh	PAS	58.07
Kemaman	Che Alias Hamid	PAS	58.11
Baling	Hassan Saad	PAS	59.13
Pokok Sena	Ahmad Saad Yahya	PAS	59.44
Hulu Terengganu	Rosol Wahid	BERSATU	59.59
Setiu	Shaharizukirnain Abdul Kadir	PAS	59.85
Safe
Jerai	Sabri Azit	PAS	60.10
Jerlun	Abd Ghani Ahmad	BERSATU	60.69
Saratok	Ali Biju	BERSATU	62.33
Tumpat	Mumtaz Md Nawi	PAS	62.51
Rantau Panjang	Siti Zailah Mohd Yusoff	PAS	62.38
Jeli	Zahari Kechik	BERSATU	63.03
Bachok	Mohd Syahir Che Sulaiman	PAS	63.89
Ketereh	Khlir Mohd Nor	BERSATU	64.49
Pendang	Awang Solahudin	PAS	64.83
Kuala Nerus	Alias Razak	PAS	64.70
Kuala Terengganu	Ahmad Amzad Mohamed Hashim	PAS	65.27
Pasir Puteh	Nik Muhammad Zawawi Salleh	PAS	65.37
Dungun	Wan Hassan Mohd Ramli	PAS	65.43
Marang	Abdul Hadi Awang	PAS	67.04
Arau	Shahidan Kassim	PAS	67.23
Sik	Ahmad Tarmizi Sulaiman	PAS	67.64
Kuala Krai	Abdul Latiff Abdul Rahman	PAS	66.08
Pasir Mas	Ahmad Fadhli Shaari	PAS	68.21
Kubang Kerian	Tuan Ibrahim Tuan Man	PAS	68.38
Pengkalan Chepa	Ahmad Marzuk Shaary	PAS	69.36
Tanah Merah	Ikmal Hisham Abdul Aziz	BERSATU	77.87

=== Changes in the composition of the Dewan Rakyat ===
Date	PH	BN	GPS	GRS	WARISAN	UPKO	STAR	KDM	PBM	MUDA	IND		PN		BERSATU	Vacant	Government (Note: Anwar Ibrahim cabinet (PH–BN–GPS–GRS–WARISAN–STAR–KDM–PBM)) + C&S (Note: Some PN MPs have declared their support for the Anwar Ibrahim government.) MPs
19 November 2022	81	30	23	6	3	0	0	2	1	1	1 (Note: Kudat MP Verdon Bahanda)		73		0	1 (Note: The election for Padang Serai is postponed due to the death of a candidate after nomination day.)	148
7 December 2022	81	30	23	6	3	0	0	2	1	1	1		▲ (Note: 2022 Padang Serai by-election – PN gains.); 74		0	▼0	148
27 June 2023	81	30	23	6	3	0	0	2	1	1	1		▼73		0	▲ (Note: The Kuala Terengganu seat is vacated following the disqualification of the incumbent Ahmad Amzad Hashim, triggering the 2023 Kuala Terengganu by-election.); 1	148
23 July 2023	▼80	30	23	6	3	0	0	2	1	1	1		73		0	▲ (Note: The Pulai seat is vacated following the death of the incumbent Salahuddin Ayub, triggering the 2023 Pulai by-election.); 2	147
12 August 2023	80	30	23	6	3	0	0	2	1	1	1		▲ (Note: 2023 Kuala Terengganu by-election – PN holds.); 74		0	▼1	147
9 September 2023	▲ (Note: 2023 Pulai by-election – PH holds.); 81	30	23	6	3	0	0	2	1	1	1		74		0	▼0	148
10 September 2023	81	30	23	6	3	0	0	2	1	1 (Note: MUDA leaves the Anwar Ibrahim government.)	1		74		0	0	147
26 September 2023	81	30	23	6	3	0	0	2	1	1	1		▼73		0	▲ (Note: The Kemaman seat is vacated following the disqualification of the incumbent Che Alias Hamid, triggering the 2023 Kemaman by-election.); 1	147
12 October 2023	81	30	23	6	3	0	0	2	1	1	1		▲ (Note: Kuala Kangsar MP Iskandar Dzulkarnain Abdul Khalid declares their support for the Anwar Ibrahim government while still being in PN.); 1	▼72	0	1	148
30 October 2023	81	30	23	6	3	0	0	2	1	1	1		▲ (Note: Labuan MP Suhaili Abdul Rahman declares their support for the Anwar Ibrahim government while still being in PN.); 2	▼71	0	1	149
7 November 2023	81	30	23	6	3	0	0	2	1	1	1		▲ (Note: Gua Musang MP Mohd Azizi Abu Naim declares their support for the Anwar Ibrahim government while still being in PN.); 3	▼70	0	1	150
8 November 2023	81	30	23	6	3	0	0	2	1	1	1		▲ (Note: Jeli MP Zahari Kechik declares their support for the Anwar Ibrahim government while still being in PN.); 4	▼69	0	1	151
28 November 2023	81	30	23	6	3	0	0	2	1	1	1		▲ (Note: Bukit Gantang MP Syed Abu Hussin Hafiz declares their support for the Anwar Ibrahim government while still being in PN.); 5	▼68	0	1	152
2 December 2023	81	30	23	6	3	0	0	2	1	1	1		5	▲ (Note: 2023 Kemaman by-election – PN holds.); 69	0	▼0	152
24 January 2024	81	30	23	6	3	0	0	2	1	1	1		▲ (Note: Tanjong Karang MP Zulkafperi Hanapi declares their support for the Anwar Ibrahim government while still being in PN.); 6	▼68	0	0	153
2 June 2024	81	30	23	6	3	0	0	2	1	1	▲ (Note: BERSATU terminated 6 MPs' membership who support the Anwar Ibrahim government.); 7		▼0	68	0	0	153
2 October 2025	81	30	23	▼5	3	0	▲ (Note: STAR leaves Gabungan Rakyat Sabah); 1	2	1	1	7		0	68	0	0	153
14 October 2025	81	30	23	5	3	0	1	2	1	1	7	▲ (Note: BERSATU terminated Tasek Gelugor MP Wan Saiful Wan Jan's membership); 1	▼67		0	0	153
10 November 2025	▼79	30	23	5	3	▲ (Note: UPKO leaves Pakatan Harapan); 2	1	2	1	1	7	1	67		0	0	153
5 December 2025	79	▼29	23	5	3	2	1	2	1	1	7	1	67		0	▲ (Note: The Kinabatangan seat is vacated following the death of the incumbent Bung Moktar Radin, triggering the 2026 Kinabatangan by-election.); 1	152
6 January 2026	79	29	23	5	3	2	1	2	1	1	7	▲ (Note: BERSATU terminated Indera Mahkota MP Saifuddin Abdullah's membership); 2	▼66		0	1	152
24 January 2026	79	▲ (Note: 2026 Kinabatangan by-election – BN holds.); 30	23	5	3	2	1	2	1	1	7	2	66		0	▼0	153
13 February 2026	79	30	23	5	3	2	1	2	1	1	7	▲ (Note: BERSATU terminated Larut MP Hamzah Zainudin's, Gerik MP Fathul Huzir Ayob's, Machang MP Wan Ahmad Fayhsal's & Padang Rengas MP Azahari Hasan's membership); 6	▼62		0	0	153
19 May 2026	▼77	30	23	5	3	2	1	2	1	1	7	6	62		0	▲ (Note: The Pandan & Setiawangsa seats is vacated following the resignation of the incumbent Rafizi Ramli and Nik Nazmi Nik Ahmad.); 2	151
13 June 2026	77	30	23	5	3	2	1	2	1	1	7	▼0	▲ (Note: Larut MP Hamzah Zainudin's, Indera Mahkota MP Saifuddin Abdullah, Tasek Gelugor MP Wan Saiful Wan Jan, Gerik MP Fathul Huzir Ayob's, Machang MP Wan Ahmad Fayhsal's & Padang Rengas MP Azahari Hasan joined WAWASAN and WAWASAN joined PN.); 68		0	2	151
18 June 2026	77	30	23	▲ (Note: UPKO joined Gabungan Rakyat Sabah.); 7	3	▼0	1	2	1	1	7		68		0	2	151
10 August 2026	▼76	30	23	7	3	0	1	2	1	1	7		68		0	▲ (Note: The Subang seat is vacated following the resignation of the incumbent Wong Chen.); 3	150
2 October 2026	▼75	30	23	7	3	0	1	2	1	1	7		68		0	▲ (Note: The Petaling Jaya seat is vacated following the resignation of the incumbent Lee Chean Chung.); 4	149
29 October 2026	75	30	23	7	3	0	1	2	1	(Note: In 29 October 2026, MUDA MP signed a confidence and supply agreement (CSA) with the Anwar Ibrahim government.); 1	7		▼62		▲ (Note: In 29 October 2026, BERSATU MPs signed a confidence and supply agreement (CSA) with the Anwar Ibrahim government.); 6	4	156

== Seating arrangement ==
Vacant	Vacant		P168 Kota Marudu	P200 Batang Sadong	P167 Kudat	P181 Tenom	P085 Pekan	P115 Batu	P130 Rasah	P207 Igan	P142 Labis	P138 Kota Melaka	P149 Sri Gading	P161 Pulai	P050 Jelutong		Vacant	Vacant
Vacant	Vacant	Vacant		P114 Kepong	P062 Sungai Siput	P220 Baram	P068 Beruas	P097 Selayang	P179 Ranau	P212 Sibu	P151 Simpang Renggam	P222 Lawas	P206 Tanjong Manis	P177 Beaufort		P214 Selangau	P064 Ipoh Timor	Vacant
	Vacant																P201 Batang Lupar
	Vacant	P030 Jeli	P166 Labuan	P186 Sandakan	P152 Kluang	P209 Julau	P198 Puncak Borneo	P180 Keningau	P195 Bandar Kuching	P165 Tanjung Piai	P104 Subang (vacant)	P159 Pasir Gudang	P053 Balik Pulau	P169 Kota Belud	P048 Bukit Bendera	P089 Bentong	P158 Tebrau
	Vacant	P032 Gua Musang														P070 Kampar	P101 Hulu Langat
	Vacant	P095 Tanjong Karang			P103 Puchong	P202 Sri Aman	P174 Penampang	P196 Stampin	P123 Cheras	P126 Jelebu	P120 Bukit Bintang	P170 Tuaran	P141 Sekijang		P099 Ampang	P204 Betong	P150 Batu Pahat
Vacant	Vacant	P059 Bukit Gantang	P146 Muar												P102 Bangi	P203 Lubok Antu	Vacant	Vacant
Vacant	Vacant	P067 Kuala Kangsar	Vacant	Vacant		P098 Gombak	P066 Batu Gajah	P118 Setiawangsa (vacant)	P051 Bukit Gelugor	P100 Pandan (vacant)	P046 Batu Kawan	P132 Port Dickson		Vacant	P110 Klang	P184 Libaran	Vacant	Vacant
Vacant	Vacant	Vacant	Vacant	Vacant										Vacant	P105 Petaling Jaya (vacant)	P127 Jempol	Vacant	Vacant
Vacant		P073 Pasir Salak	P001 Padang Besar	P017 Padang Serai										Senator Marhamah Rosli (Deputy Minister)	P173 Putatan	P129 Kuala Pilah		Vacant
		P083 Kuantan	P002 Kangar	P014 Merbok	Vacant		P122 Seputeh	P072 Tapah	P199 Serian	P153 Sembrong	P148 Ayer Hitam		P216 Hulu Rajang (Deputy Minister)	P190 Tawau (Deputy Minister)	P178 Sipitang	P133 Tampin
	Vacant	P092 Sabak Bernam	P091 Rompin	P136 Tangga Batu	Vacant		P189 Semporna	P043 Bagan	P090 Bera	P124 Bandar Tun Razak			P052 Bayan Baru (Deputy Minister)	P219 Miri (Deputy Minister)	P191 Kalabakan	P145 Bakri	Vacant
	Vacant	P069 Parit	P005 Jerlun	Vacant	P004 Langkawi	P205 Saratok	E		D		C	P084 Paya Besar (Deputy Minister)	P060 Taiping (Deputy Minister)	P192 Mas Gading (Deputy Minister)	P080 Raub	P187 Kinabatangan	Vacant
	Vacant	P074 Lumut	P061 Padang Rengas	P034 Setiu	P039 Dungun	P125 Putrajaya	E		Sergeant-at-Arm		C	P137 Hang Tuah Jaya (Deputy Minister)	P218 Sibuti (Deputy Minister)	P144 Ledang (Deputy Minister)	P071 Gopeng	P108 Shah Alam	Vacant
	Vacant	P088 Temerloh	P041 Kepala Batas	P109 Kapar	P086 Maran	P143 Pagoh	E				C	P049 Tanjong (Deputy Minister)	P065 Ipoh Barat (Deputy Minister)	P140 Segamat (Deputy Minister)	P116 Wangsa Maju	P155 Tenggara	Vacant
		P018 Kulim-Bandar Baharu	P035 Kuala Nerus	P019 Tumpat	P023 Rantau Panjang	P009 Alor Setar	F		the Mace		B	P156 Kota Tinggi (Minister)	P193 Santubong (Minister)	P147 Parit Sulong (Minister)	P213 Mukah (Deputy Minister)	P113 Sepang (Deputy Minister)
		P007 Padang Terap	P139 Jasin	P033 Besut	P020 Pengkalan Chepa	P003 Arau	F		the Mace		B	P215 Kapit (Minister)	P047 Nibong Tebal (Minister)	Senator Amir Hamzah Azizan (Minister)	P197 Kota Samarahan (Deputy Minister)	P208 Sarikei (Deputy Minister)
	Vacant	P054 Gerik	P112 Kuala Langat	P026 Ketereh	P093 Sungai Besar	P082 Indera Mahkota	F		the Mace		B	P131 Rembau (Minister)	P175 Papar (Minister)	P182 Pensiangan (Minister)	P221 Limbang (Deputy Minister)	P188 Lahad Datu (Deputy Minister)	P163 Kulai (Deputy Minister)
	Vacant	P010 Kuala Kedah	P057 Parit Buntar	P042 Tasek Gelugor	P008 Pokok Sena	P058 Bagan Serai	F		the Mace		B	P076 Teluk Intan (Minister)	P119 Titiwangsa (Minister)	P045 Bukit Mertajam (Minister)	P164 Pontian (Deputy Minister)	P162 Iskandar Puteri (Deputy Minister)	P185 Batu Sapi (Deputy Minister)
	Vacant	P016 Baling	P044 Permatang Pauh	P031 Kuala Krai	P029 Machang	P183 Beluran	G				A	P111 Kota Raja (Minister)	P210 Kanowit (Minister)	P160 Johor Bahru (Minister)	P015 Sungai Petani (Minister)	P055 Lenggong (Deputy Minister)	P176 Kimanis (Deputy Minister)
	Vacant	P154 Mersing	P006 Kubang Pasu	P036 Kuala Terengganu	P038 Hulu Terengganu	P024 Kubang Kerian	G				A	P128 Seremban	P121 Lembah Pantai (Minister)	P096 Kuala Selangor (Minister)	Senator Zulkifli Hasan (Minister)	P079 Lipis (Deputy Minister)	P211 Lanang (Deputy Speaker)
	Vacant	P081 Jerantut	P012 Jerai	P028 Pasir Puteh	P025 Bachok	P037 Marang	G				A	P194 Petra Jaya (Deputy Prime Minister)	Senator Zambry Abd Kadir (Minister)	P106 Damansara (Minister)	P171 Sepanggar (Minister)	P135 Alor Gajah (Deputy Minister)	P078 Cameron Highlands (Deputy Speaker)
		P094 Hulu Selangor	P022 Pasir Mas	P011 Pendang	P134 Masjid Tanah	P040 Kemaman	G				A	P075 Bagan Datuk (Deputy Prime Minister)	P077 Tanjong Malim (Minister)	P117 Segambut (Minister)	P107 Sungai Buloh (Minister)	P172 Kota Kinabalu (Deputy Minister)
		P087 Kuala Krau	P013 Sik	P027 Tanah Merah	P021 Kota Bharu	P056 Larut (Opposition Leader)	G		Secretary		A	P063 Tambun (Prime Minister)	Senator Saifuddin Nasution Ismail (Minister)	P157 Pengerang (Minister)	P217 Bintulu (Minister)	Senator Fuziah Salleh (Deputy Minister)
									Speaker
									Yang Di-Pertuan Agong

- The seating arrangement is viewable at the official website of the Parliament.

== Elected members by state ==
Shortcut:

Perlis | Kedah | Kelantan | Terengganu | Pulau Pinang | Perak | Pahang | Selangor | Kuala Lumpur | Putrajaya | Negeri Sembilan | Malacca | Johor | Labuan | Sabah | Sarawak

Unless noted otherwise, the MPs served the entire term of the parliament (from 19 December 2022).

=== Perlis ===
No.	Federal Constituency	Member	Coalition (party)
PN 3
P001	Padang Besar	Rushdan Rusmi	PN (PAS)
P002	Kangar	Zakri Hassan (Note: Unilaterally mentioned by Hamzah Zainuddin as MP aligned to him)	PN (BERSATU)
P003	Arau	Shahidan Kassim	PN (PAS)

=== Kedah ===
No.	Federal Constituency	Member	Coalition (party)
PN 11 | BERSATU 3 | PH 1
P004	Langkawi	Mohd Suhaimi Abdullah (Note: In 29 October 2026, 6 BERSATU MPs signed a confidence and supply agreement (CSA) with the Anwar Ibrahim government.)	BERSATU
P005	Jerlun	Abd Ghani Ahmad	PN (PAS)
P006	Kubang Pasu	Ku Abd Rahman Ku Ismail	PN (BERSATU)
P007	Padang Terap	Nurul Amin Hamid	PN (PAS)
P008	Pokok Sena	Ahmad Saad @ Yahaya	PN (PAS)
P009	Alor Setar	Afnan Hamimi Taib Azamudden	PN (PAS)
P010	Kuala Kedah	Ahmad Fakhruddin Fakhrurazi	PN (PAS)
P011	Pendang	Awang Hashim	PN (PAS)
P012	Jerai	Sabri Azit	PN (PAS)
P013	Sik	Ahmad Tarmizi Sulaiman	PN (PAS)
P014	Merbok	Mohd Nazri Abu Hassan	BERSATU
P015	Sungai Petani	Mohammed Taufiq Johari	PH (PKR)
P016	Baling	Hassan Saad	PN (PAS)
P017	Padang Serai	Azman Nasrudin	BERSATU
P018	Kulim-Bandar Baharu	Roslan Hashim	PN (BERSATU)

=== Kelantan ===
No.	Federal Constituency	Member	Coalition (party)
PN 12 | IND 2
P019	Tumpat	Mumtaz Md Nawi	PN (PAS)
P020	Pengkalan Chepa	Ahmad Marzuk Shaary	PN (PAS)
P021	Kota Bharu	Takiyuddin Hassan	PN (PAS)
P022	Pasir Mas	Ahmad Fadhli Shaari	PN (PAS)
P023	Rantau Panjang	Siti Zailah Mohd Yusoff	PN (PAS)
P024	Kubang Kerian	Tuan Ibrahim Tuan Man	PN (PAS)
P025	Bachok	Mohd Syahir Che Sulaiman	PN (PAS)
P026	Ketereh	Khlir Mohd Nor	PN (BERSATU)
P027	Tanah Merah	Ikmal Hisham Abdul Aziz	PN (BERSATU)
P028	Pasir Puteh	Nik Muhammad Zawawi Salleh	PN (PAS)
P029	Machang	Wan Ahmad Fayhsal Wan Ahmad Kamal (Note: On 13 February 2026, Wan Fayhsal had his party membership terminated and thus became an independent.)	PN (WAWASAN)
P030	Jeli	Zahari Kechik (Note: On 8 November 2023, Zahari declared support for the current government, had his party membership terminated on 2 June 2024 and thus became an independent.)	IND
P031	Kuala Krai	Abdul Latiff Abdul Rahman	PN (PAS)
P032	Gua Musang	Mohd Azizi Abu Naim (Note: On 7 November 2023, Mohd Azizi declared support for the current government, had his party membership terminated on 2 June 2024 and thus became an independent.)	IND

=== Terengganu ===
No.	Federal Constituency	Member	Coalition (party)
PN 8
P033	Besut	Che Mohamad Zulkifly Jusoh	PN (PAS)
P034	Setiu	Shaharizukirnain Abdul Kadir	PN (PAS)
P035	Kuala Nerus	Alias Razak	PN (PAS)
P036	Kuala Terengganu	Ahmad Amzad Hashim recontest and won on 12 August 2023 (Note: On 27 June 2023, the Terengganu Election Court ordered a fresh election for the Kuala Terengganu Parliamentary Seat after declaring the contest in the 15th General Election held in November 2022 null and void. Ahmad Amzad was the incumbent MP.)	PN (PAS)
P037	Marang	Abdul Hadi Awang	PN (PAS)
P038	Hulu Terengganu	Rosol Wahid	PN (BERSATU)
P039	Dungun	Wan Hassan Mohd Ramli	PN (PAS)
P040	Kemaman	Ahmad Samsuri Mokhtar from 2 December 2023 (Note: Samsuri was elected to Parliament in the Kemaman by-election, 2023 after declaring the contest in the 15th General Election held in November 2022 null and void. .)	PN (PAS)
P040	Kemaman	Che Alias Hamid until 26 September 2023	PN (PAS)

=== Penang ===
No.	Federal Constituency	Member	Coalition (party)
PH 10 | PN 3
P041	Kepala Batas	Siti Mastura Muhammad	PN (PAS)
P042	Tasek Gelugor	Wan Saifulruddin Wan Jan (Note: On 14 October 2025, Wan Saiful had his party membership terminated and thus became an independent.)	PN (WAWASAN)
P043	Bagan	Lim Guan Eng	PH (DAP)
P044	Permatang Pauh	Muhammad Fawwaz Mohamad Jan	PN (PAS)
P045	Bukit Mertajam	Steven Sim Chee Keong	PH (DAP)
P046	Batu Kawan	Chow Kon Yeow	PH (DAP)
P047	Nibong Tebal	Fadhlina Sidek	PH (PKR)
P048	Bukit Bendera	Syerleena Abdul Rashid	PH (DAP)
P049	Tanjong	Lim Hui Ying	PH (DAP)
P050	Jelutong	Sanisvara Nethaji Rayer s/o Rajaji	PH (DAP)
P051	Bukit Gelugor	Ramkarpal Singh	PH (DAP)
P052	Bayan Baru	Sim Tze Tzin	PH (PKR)
P053	Balik Pulau	Muhammad Bakhtiar Wan Chik (Note: Present at Rafizi Ramli's defection event) (Note: Under Rafizi's camp during party election)	PH (PKR)

=== Perak ===
No.	Federal Constituency	Member	Coalition (party)
PH 11 | PN 8 | BN 3 | IND 2
P054	Gerik	Fathul Huzir Ayob (Note: On 13 February 2026, Fathul had his party membership terminated and thus became an independent.)	PN (WAWASAN)
P055	Lenggong	Shamsul Anuar Nasarah	BN (UMNO)
P056	Larut	Hamzah Zainudin (Note: On 13 February 2026, Hamzah Zainudin had his party membership terminated and thus became an independent.) (Opposition Leader)	PN (WAWASAN)
P057	Parit Buntar	Mohd Misbahul Munir Masduki	PN (PAS)
P058	Bagan Serai	Idris Ahmad	PN (PAS)
P059	Bukit Gantang	Syed Abu Hussin Hafiz Syed Abdul Fasal (Note: On 28 November 2023, Syed Abu Hussin declared support for the current government, had his party membership terminated on 2 June 2024 and thus became an independent.)	IND
P060	Taiping	Wong Kah Woh	PH (DAP)
P061	Padang Rengas	Azahari Hasan (Note: On 13 February 2026, Azahari Hasan had his party membership terminated and thus became an independent.)	PN (WAWASAN)
P062	Sungai Siput	Kesavan Subramaniam	PH (PKR)
P063	Tambun	Anwar Ibrahim (Prime Minister)	PH (PKR)
P064	Ipoh Timor	Howard Lee Chuan How	PH (DAP)
P065	Ipoh Barat	Kulasegaran Murugeson	PH (DAP)
P066	Batu Gajah	Sivakumar Varatharaju Naidu	PH (DAP)
P067	Kuala Kangsar	Iskandar Dzulkarnain Abdul Khalid (Note: On 12 October 2023, Iskandar Dzulkarnain declared support for the current government, had his party membership terminated on 2 June 2024 and thus became an independent.)	IND
P068	Beruas	Ngeh Koo Ham	PH (DAP)
P069	Parit	Muhammad Ismi Mat Taib	PN (PAS)
P070	Kampar	Chong Zhemin	PH (DAP)
P071	Gopeng	Tan Kar Hing	PH (PKR)
P072	Tapah	Saravanan Murugan	BN (MIC)
P073	Pasir Salak	Jamaludin Yahya	PN (PAS)
P074	Lumut	Nordin Ahmad Ismail	PN (BERSATU)
P075	Bagan Datuk	Ahmad Zahid Hamidi (First Deputy Prime Minister)	BN (UMNO)
P076	Teluk Intan	Nga Kor Ming	PH (DAP)
P077	Tanjong Malim	Chang Lih Kang	PH (PKR)

=== Pahang ===
No.	Federal Constituency	Member	Coalition (party)
PN 7 | BN 5 | PH 2
P078	Cameron Highlands	Ramli Mohd Nor (First Deputy Speaker)	BN (UMNO)
P079	Lipis	Abdul Rahman Mohamad	BN (UMNO)
P080	Raub	Chow Yu Hui	PH (DAP)
P081	Jerantut	Khairil Nizam Khirudin	PN (PAS)
P082	Indera Mahkota	Saifuddin Abdullah (Note: On 6 January 2026, Saifuddin had his party membership terminated and thus became an independent.)	PN (WAWASAN)
P083	Kuantan	Wan Razali Wan Nor	PN (PAS)
P084	Paya Besar	Mohd Shahar Abdullah	BN (UMNO)
P085	Pekan	Sh Mohmed Puzi Sh Ali	BN (UMNO)
P086	Maran	Ismail Abdul Muttalib	PN (PAS)
P087	Kuala Krau	Kamal Ashaari	PN (PAS)
P088	Temerloh	Salamiah Mohd Nor	PN (PAS)
P089	Bentong	Young Syefura Othman	PH (DAP)
P090	Bera	Ismail Sabri Yaakob	BN (UMNO)
P091	Rompin	Abdul Khalib Abdullah	PN (BERSATU)

=== Selangor ===
No.	Federal Constituency	Member	Coalition (party)
PH 13 | PN 5 | IND 1 | VAC 3
P092	Sabak Bernam	Kalam Salan	PN (BERSATU)
P093	Sungai Besar	Muslimin Yahaya	PN (BERSATU)
P094	Hulu Selangor	Mohd Hasnizan Harun	PN (PAS)
P095	Tanjong Karang	Zulkafperi Hanapi (Note: On 24 January 2024, Zulkafperi Hanapi declared support for the current government, had his party membership terminated on 2 June 2024 and thus became an independent.)	IND
P096	Kuala Selangor	Dzulkefly Ahmad	PH (AMANAH)
P097	Selayang	William Leong Jee Keen	PH (PKR)
P098	Gombak	Amirudin Shari	PH (PKR)
P099	Ampang	Rodziah Ismail	PH (PKR)
P100	Pandan	Vacant since 19 May 2026	VAC
P100	Pandan	Mohd Rafizi Ramli until 19 May 2026	PH (PKR)
P101	Hulu Langat	Mohd Sany Hamzan	PH (AMANAH)
P102	Bangi	Syahredzan Johan	PH (DAP)
P103	Puchong	Yeo Bee Yin	PH (DAP)
P104	Subang	Vacant since 10 August 2026	VAC
P104	Subang	Wong Chen until 10 August 2026	PH (PKR)
P105	Petaling Jaya	Vacant since 2 October 2026	VAC
P105	Petaling Jaya	Lee Chean Chunguntil 2 October 2026	PH (PKR)
P106	Damansara	Gobind Singh Deo	PH (DAP)
P107	Sungai Buloh	Ramanan Ramakrishnan	PH (PKR)
P108	Shah Alam	Azli Yusof	PH (AMANAH)
P109	Kapar	Halimah Ali	PN (PAS)
P110	Klang	Ganabatirau Veraman	PH (DAP)
P111	Kota Raja	Mohamad Sabu	PH (AMANAH)
P112	Kuala Langat	Ahmad Yunus Hairi	PN (PAS)
P113	Sepang	Aiman Athirah Sabu	PH (AMANAH)

=== Federal Territory of Kuala Lumpur ===
No.	Federal Constituency	Member	Coalition (party)
PH 9 | BN 1 | VAC 1
P114	Kepong	Lim Lip Eng	PH (DAP)
P115	Batu	Prabakaran Parameswaran	PH (PKR)
P116	Wangsa Maju	Zahir Hassan	PH (PKR)
P117	Segambut	Hannah Yeoh Tseow Suan	PH (DAP)
P118	Setiawangsa	Vacant since 19 May 2026	VAC
P118	Setiawangsa	Nik Nazmi Nik Ahmad until 19 May 2026	PH (PKR)
P119	Titiwangsa	Johari Abdul Ghani	BN (UMNO)
P120	Bukit Bintang	Fong Kui Lun	PH (DAP)
P121	Lembah Pantai	Ahmad Fahmi Mohamed Fadzil	PH (PKR)
P122	Seputeh	Teresa Kok Suh Sim	PH (DAP)
P123	Cheras	Tan Kok Wai	PH (DAP)
P124	Bandar Tun Razak	Wan Azizah Wan Ismail	PH (PKR)

=== Federal Territory of Putrajaya ===
No.	Federal Constituency	Member	Coalition (party)
BERSATU 1
P125	Putrajaya	Mohd Radzi Md Jidin	BERSATU

=== Negeri Sembilan ===
No.	Federal Constituency	Member	Coalition (party)
BN 5 | PH 3
P126	Jelebu	Jalaluddin Alias	BN (UMNO)
P127	Jempol	Shamshulkahar Mohd Deli	BN (UMNO)
P128	Seremban	Loke Siew Fook	PH (DAP)
P129	Kuala Pilah	Adnan Abu Hassan	BN (UMNO)
P130	Rasah	Cha Kee Chin	PH (DAP)
P131	Rembau	Mohamad Hasan	BN (UMNO)
P132	Port Dickson	Aminuddin Harun	PH (PKR)
P133	Tampin	Mohd Isam Mohd Isa	BN (UMNO)

=== Malacca ===
No.	Federal Constituency	Member	Coalition (party)
PH 3 | PN 3
P134	Masjid Tanah	Mas Ermieyati Samsudin	PN (BERSATU)
P135	Alor Gajah	Adly Zahari	PH (AMANAH)
P136	Tangga Batu	Bakri Jamaluddin	PN (PAS)
P137	Hang Tuah Jaya	Adam Adli Abdul Halim	PH (PKR)
P138	Kota Melaka	Khoo Poay Tiong	PH (DAP)
P139	Jasin	Zulkifli Ismail	PN (PAS)

=== Johor ===
No.	Federal Constituency	Member	Coalition (party)
PH 14 | BN 9 | PN 1 | BERSATU 1 | MUDA 1
P140	Segamat	Yuneswaran Ramaraj	PH (PKR)
P141	Sekijang	Zaliha Mustafa	PH (PKR)
P142	Labis	Pang Hok Liong	PH (DAP)
P143	Pagoh	Muhyiddin Yassin	BERSATU
P144	Ledang	Syed Ibrahim Syed Noh	PH (PKR)
P145	Bakri	Tan Hong Pin	PH (DAP)
P146	Muar	Syed Saddiq Syed Abdul Rahman	MUDA
P147	Parit Sulong	Noraini Ahmad	BN (UMNO)
P148	Ayer Hitam	Wee Ka Siong	BN (MCA)
P149	Sri Gading	Aminolhuda Hassan	PH (AMANAH)
P150	Batu Pahat	Onn Abu Bakar	PH (PKR)
P151	Simpang Renggam	Hasni Mohammad	BN (UMNO)
P152	Kluang	Wong Shu Qi	PH (DAP)
P153	Sembrong	Hishammuddin Hussein	BN (UMNO)
P154	Mersing	Muhammad Islahuddin Abas	PN (BERSATU)
P155	Tenggara	Manndzri Nasib	BN (UMNO)
P156	Kota Tinggi	Mohamed Khaled Nordin	BN (UMNO)
P157	Pengerang	Azalina Othman Said	BN (UMNO)
P158	Tebrau	Jimmy Puah Wee Tse	PH (PKR)
P159	Pasir Gudang	Hassan Abdul Karim	PH (PKR)
P160	Johor Bahru	Akmal Nasrullah Mohd Nasir	PH (PKR)
P161	Pulai	Suhaizan Kayat since 9 September 2023 (Note: Suhaizan was elected to Parliament in the Pulai by-election, 2023 following the death of Salahuddin Ayub.)	PH (AMANAH)
P161	Pulai	Salahuddin Ayub until 23 July 2023	PH (AMANAH)
P162	Iskandar Puteri	Liew Chin Tong	PH (DAP)
P163	Kulai	Teo Nie Ching	PH (DAP)
P164	Pontian	Ahmad Maslan	BN (UMNO)
P165	Tanjung Piai	Wee Jeck Seng	BN (MCA)

=== Federal Territory of Labuan ===
No.	Federal Constituency	Member	Coalition (party)
IND 1
P166	Labuan	Suhaili Abdul Rahman (Note: On 30 October 2023, Suhaili Abdul Rahman declared support for the current government, had his party membership terminated on 2 June 2024 and thus became an independent.)	IND

=== Sabah ===
No.	Federal Constituency	Member	Coalition (party)
BN 7 | GRS 7 | PH 3 | WARISAN 3 | KDM 2 | PN 1 | STAR 1 | IND 1
P167	Kudat	Verdon Bahanda	IND
P168	Kota Marudu	Wetrom Bahanda	KDM
P169	Kota Belud	Isnaraissah Munirah Majilis	WARISAN
P170	Tuaran	Wilfred Madius Tangau (Note: Was elected to Parliament on the ticket of the Pakatan Harapan, but UPKO officially withdrew from PH in November 2025 to become independent, then joined GRS on June 2026)	GRS (UPKO)
P171	Sepanggar	Mustapha @ Mohd Yunus Sakmud	PH (PKR)
P172	Kota Kinabalu	Chan Foong Hin	PH (DAP)
P173	Putatan	Shahelmey Yahya	BN (UMNO)
P174	Penampang	Ewon Benedick	GRS (UPKO)
P175	Papar	Armizan Mohd Ali (Note: Upon swearing-in as MP held separate GRS and BERSATU memberships while contesting under GRS, expelled from BERSATU on 21 December 2022)	GRS
P176	Kimanis	Mohamad Alamin	BN (UMNO)
P177	Beaufort	Siti Aminah Aching	BN (UMNO)
P178	Sipitang	Matbali Musah	GRS
P179	Ranau	Jonathan Yasin	GRS
P180	Keningau	Jeffrey Kitingan (Note: Jeffrey Kitingan was elected to Parliament on the ticket of the Gabungan Rakyat Sabah, but STAR officially withdrew from GRS in October 2025 to become independent.)	STAR
P181	Tenom	Riduan Rubin	KDM
P182	Pensiangan	Arthur Joseph Kurup	BN (PBRS)
P183	Beluran	Ronald Kiandee	PN (BERSATU)
P184	Libaran	Suhaimi Nasir	BN (UMNO)
P185	Batu Sapi	Khairul Firdaus Akbar Khan	GRS
P186	Sandakan	Vivian Wong Shir Yee	PH (DAP)
P187	Kinabatangan	Mohd Kurniawan Naim Moktar since 24 January 2026	BN (UMNO)
P187	Kinabatangan	Bung Moktar Radin until 5 December 2025	BN (UMNO)
P188	Lahad Datu	Mohammad Yusof Apdal	WARISAN
P189	Semporna	Mohd Shafie Apdal	WARISAN
P190	Tawau	Lo Su Fui	GRS (PBS)
P191	Kalabakan	Andi Muhammad Suryady Bandy	BN (UMNO)

=== Sarawak ===
No.	Federal Constituency	Member	Coalition (party)
GPS 23 | PH 6 | BERSATU 1 | PBM 1
P192	Mas Gading	Mordi Bimol	PH (DAP)
P193	Santubong	Nancy Shukri	GPS (PBB)
P194	Petra Jaya	Fadillah Yusof (Second Deputy Prime Minister)	GPS (PBB)
P195	Bandar Kuching	Kelvin Yii Lee Wuen	PH (DAP)
P196	Stampin	Chong Chieng Jen	PH (DAP)
P197	Kota Samarahan	Rubiah Wang	GPS (PBB)
P198	Puncak Borneo	Willie Mongin	GPS (PBB)
P199	Serian	Richard Riot Jaem	GPS (SUPP)
P200	Batang Sadong	Rodiyah Sapiee	GPS (PBB)
P201	Batang Lupar	Mohamad Shafizan Kepli	GPS (PBB)
P202	Sri Aman	Doris Sophia Brodi	GPS (PRS)
P203	Lubok Antu	Roy Angau Gingkoi	GPS (PRS)
P204	Betong	Richard Rapu	GPS (PBB)
P205	Saratok	Ali Biju	BERSATU
P206	Tanjong Manis	Yusuf Abd Wahab	GPS (PBB)
P207	Igan	Ahmad Johnie Zawawi	GPS (PBB)
P208	Sarikei	Huang Tiong Sii	GPS (SUPP)
P209	Julau	Larry Sng Wei Shien	PBM
P210	Kanowit	Aaron Ago Dagang	GPS (PRS)
P211	Lanang	Alice Lau Kiong Yieng (Deputy Speaker)	PH (DAP)
P212	Sibu	Oscar Ling Chai Yew	PH (DAP)
P213	Mukah	Hanifah Hajar Taib	GPS (PBB)
P214	Selangau	Edwin Banta	GPS (PRS)
P215	Kapit	Alexander Nanta Linggi	GPS (PBB)
P216	Hulu Rajang	Wilson Ugak Kumbong	GPS (PRS)
P217	Bintulu	Tiong King Sing	GPS (PDP)
P218	Sibuti	Lukanisman Awang Sauni	GPS (PBB)
P219	Miri	Chiew Choon Man	PH (PKR)
P220	Baram	Anyi Ngau	GPS (PDP)
P221	Limbang	Hasbi Habibollah	GPS (PBB)
P222	Lawas	Henry Sum Agong	GPS (PBB)
