= Ops Turun, anti-price hike rally 2013 =

2013 protest in Malaysia

Ops Turun is an anti-price hike rally that was held in Kuala Lumpur, Malaysia on December 31, 2013. The rally was organised by non-government organisations Gerakan Turun Kos Sara Hidup (Turun) and Gerakan3112 in response to the Malaysian government raising prices of essential foodstuffs, fuel and toll rates. At the same time the opposition highlighted the inadequate salary increments, corruption and illicit outflow of funds from Malaysia.

== Background ==
Since the last general elections, the Malaysian government began to backtrack on many of their election promises by raising the prices and cost of living over a broad scope of items:

1. Electricity
2. Highway tolls
3. Fuel prices
4. An introduction of a GST of 6%
5. Sugar price

== Pre-rally incidents ==
There have been many postings on Facebook by Malaysians venting their frustrations on the rising cost of living and the government's indifference to their plight, including Prime Minister Najib's Facebook page.

The police arrested the chairman of Turun, Azan Safar on the charge of trying to overthrow the government. Turun members said they will go ahead with the rally in spite of police warnings. Another arrest was made of a man in connection to the protest of selling T-shirts which the police considered seditious. The police has listed four groups out to make trouble during the rally such as Gerakan Turun Kos Sara Hidup, PKR-backed group Jingga 13, youth group Solidariti Anak Muda Malaysia (SAMM), and student movement Solidariti Mahasiswa Malaysia (SMM).

The Bar Council of Malaysia has called on the government and police to make sure the rally goes peacefully. Malaysian human rights group SUARAM has promised to provide legal aid to protesters who have been arrested in the rally by the police.

The government-linked newspaper Utusan has reported about an email sent by opposition figures of trying to cause chaos and overthrow the government during the rally. Former IGP Norian Mai has refuted this claims, saying it was unlikely that Malaysians would follow the example of Arab Spring. Opposition member, Rafizi Ramli was questioned in regards to allegations by a pro-UMNO blogger that explosives will be used during the rally. The police has been accused of being non-professional in not going after the pro-UMNO blogs for creating the rumours. Jingga 13 and SAMM plan to sue the police over the allegation that they plan to overthrow the government.

As a precaution to the protests to be held in Dataran Merdeka, 300 personnel from City Hall are to be deployed for that night, including step-up patrols by the police. The police began deploying 1,000 personnel in various locations in Penang to deal with protest over there to be stage in conjunction with the protests in Dataran Merdeka.

== Rally and aftermath ==
Thousands of protesters gathered at various parts of Kuala Lumpur to begin their march to Dataran Merdeka such as Sogo Shopping Complex, Pasar Seni and Masjid Jamek. Protesters, numbering 50,000 according to Turun broke through the police cordons surrounding Dataran Merdeka where a new year concert was being held. However, some local media reported there were only 30,000 or fewer people were attended. The protesters were allowed to shout slogans protesting the price hikes. After 1 o'clock in the morning the protesters began to disperse peacefully.

The police said they would begin to probe and arrest the organisers of the protest under the pretext of the Peaceful Assembly Act 2012.
