= Nottingham Malaysian Games =

UK sports competition involving Malaysian-related university groups

Nottingham Malaysian Games, known to many as Notts Games, is the largest sporting event of its kind, attracting members of Malaysian-related university societies from the length and breadth of England, Scotland, Wales and Ireland. It was first organised by the committee of Nottingham Malaysian Society in 1985 and has been since held annually. It is held at 5 different venues; University of Nottingham Sports Centre, Portland Building, Nottingham Tennis Centre, PowerLeague Nottingham and Highfields Park. It is held in conjunction with Malaysian Food Festival. There were many arising issues with the organisation of the society for the games over the 2020-2021 period. Nevertheless, the Nottingham Malaysian Society made a huge comeback with Nottingham Malaysian Games 2022.

== Participated Universities ==
University	Year	University	Year
University of Nottingham	1985–Present		
University of Aberdeen	? - 2006	University of Bath	? - 2006
University of Birmingham	? - 2006	University of Bristol	? - Present
University of Cambridge	? - 2006	Cardiff University	? - Present
De Montfort University	?	University of Derby	?
University of Dundee	? - Present	Durham University	?
University of East Anglia	?	University of East London	?
University of Edinburgh	? - 2006	University of Essex	?
University of Exeter	? - 2006	University of Glasgow	?
Heriot-Watt University	? - 2006	University of Kent	? - 2006
Lancaster University	? - 2006	University of Leeds	? - Present
University of Leicester	? - 2006	University of Liverpool	? - 2006
University of London	? - 2006	Imperial College London	? - Present
King's College London	? - Present	London School of Economics (LSE)	? - 2006
Queen Mary, University of London	? - 2006	Royal Academy of Music	?
St George's, University of London	?	University College London (UCL)	? - Present
Loughborough University	? - Present	University of Manchester	? - Present
Newcastle University	? - 2006	University of Northampton	?
Northumbria University	?	University of Oxford	? - 2006
University of Plymouth	? - 2006	University of Portsmouth	? - 2006
Queen's University Belfast	?	St Mary's University College	?
University of Reading	?	Royal College of Art, London	?
University of St Andrews	? - 2006	University of Sheffield	? - 2011
University of Southampton	? - 2006	University of Stirling	?
University of Sunderland	?	Saint Mary's College, London	?
University of Sussex	?	University of Teesside	? - 2006
Thames Valley University	?	University of Ulster	?
University of Wales	? - 2006	University of Wales, Aberystwyth	? - 2006
University of Wales, Bangor	?	University of Wales, Lampeter	?
University of Wales, Newport	?	University of Wales, Swansea	? - 2006
University of Warwick	? - 2010	University of Westminster	?
University of the West of England	?	University of Winchester	?
University of Wolverhampton	? - 2006	University of Worcester	?
University of York	? - 2006	York St John University	?

== History ==
=== 1985 - 2005 ===
The first inception of Nottingham Malaysian Games was in 1985, the year it was introduced by then NMS Committee. From 1985 until 2005, the games have started to gain interest and participation by Malaysians in United Kingdom.

=== 2006 - 2008 ===
The 20th Nottingham Malaysian Games (2006) saw one of the biggest number of dignitaries present for the event, with then Higher Education Minister Datuk Mustapa Mohamed, accompanied by Education Minister Datuk Seri Hishammuddin Tun Hussein and Domestic Trade and Consumer Affairs Minister Datuk Shafie Apdal, was given the honour to launch the game at the sports centre. The event also began to attract participation from Ireland. Squash was introduced in 2006. Two vice-chancellors from Malaysia were also present, with an estimated record number of 5,200 students from more than 60 universities.

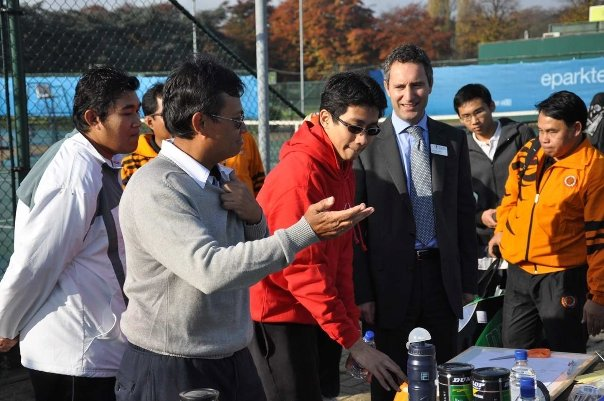
Dato' Ahmad Shabery Cheek with delegates and 2009/2010 Nottingham Malaysian Society President.

In 2007 and 2008, no significant changes were done to the organisation and structure of the Games, but high quality was maintained throughout the running of the games in both years. In 2008, the event was officiated by Datuk Seri Mohamed Khaled Nordin, Higher Education Minister of Malaysia.

=== 2009 (Silver Jubilee) ===
In 2009, the 25th Year celebration was held, breaking the record of number of dignitaries, participants and supporters, with more than half of Malaysians currently in UK and Ireland congregating in Nottingham for the event. The event was graced with the attendance of the Minister of Youth and Sports, Dato' Ahmad Shabery Cheek, representing Dato' Sri Najib Tun Razak, the Prime Minister of Malaysia. During the event, he complimented the leadership values portrayed by the committee in organising such a large event with little help from sponsoring companies and the Government

Delegates present during the event were:

- the Minister of Youth and Sports, Dato' Ahmad Shabery Cheek, representing Dato' Sri Najib Tun Razak, the Prime Minister of Malaysia
- Professor David Greenaway, Vice Chancellor of University of Nottingham
- delegates from Malaysian Students' Department UK and Ireland
- delegates from University of Nottingham International Office and Vice Chancellor's Office
- delegates from Malaysian Ministry of Youth and Sports

2009's Motto read: New Games, New Ground, New Generation.

The year 2009 also saw the largest number of media representatives, including:

- TV3, Malaysia's leading TV Network
- MadGrapeTV
- New Straits Times Press

=== Results ===
Year	Overall Champion	5-a-side Football
2012	University of Manchester	
2011	University of Manchester	University of Sheffield
2010	Imperial College London	University of Southampton
2009	University of Nottingham	University of Sheffield (Runner-up)
2006	University of Nottingham	?
2005	?	London School of Economics
2004	?	University of Bristol
Year	Badminton Male	Badminton Female
2006	?	?
2005	?	?
2004	?	?
2003	Preston University ( )	
2002	University of Nottingham (Rozaini Bin Kasmin)	
2001	?	?
Year	Badminton Double	Basketball
2012	University of Manchester	University of Manchester
2011	University of Manchester	University of Manchester
2006	Cardiff University	?
2005	?	?
2004	?	?
2003	University of Nottingham (Rozaini Bin Kasmin & Lim Siang Yew)	
2002	University of Nottingham (Rozaini Bin Kasmin & Lim Siang Yew)	
Year	Lightning Chess	Lightning Snooker
2006	Imperial College London	?
2005	University College London (UCL)	?
2004	University of Southampton	?
2007	University of Central Lancashire	
Year	Table Tennis Male	Table Tennis Female
2006	?	?
2005	?	University of Southampton
2004	?	?
Year	Scrabble	
2006	?	
2005	?	
2004	?	
Year	Netball	Volleyball
2006	University of Nottingham	?
2005	?	?
2004	?	?
Year	Squash Male	Squash Female
2011	University of Manchester	?
2006*	University of Nottingham	University of Bristol

- Squash was introduced in 2006.
- Tennis, Congkak and Batu Seremban were introduced in 2009.

== Oath ==
The sportsmanship oath is recited before the start of the games, and was first introduced in 2008.

We, the participants of Nottingham Malaysian Games, vow to abide to the good virtues of sportsmanship and conform to the etiquette of sport. We shall express our aspiration for sports with proper consideration for fairness and equality, and shall practise the following qualities of a good sportsman:

- Full commitment to participation
- Respect and concern for rules and officials
- Respect and concern for social conventions
- Respect and concern for the opponent
- Avoid poor attitudes toward participation

Kami, para peserta Nottingham Malaysian Games, berikrar akan patuh kepada nilai-nilai murni serta etiket kesukanan. Kami akan melahirkan semangat kesukanan dengan mengambil kira keadilan dan kesaksamaan, serta akan taat kepada prinsip-prinsip berikut:

- Komitmen kepada penyertaan
- Penghormatan kepada peraturan serta pegawai sukan
- Penghormatan kepada konvensyen sosial
- Penghormatan kepada pihak lawan
- Penghindaran sikap-sikap negatif terhadap penyertaan

== See also ==
- University of Nottingham
- Nottingham Malaysian Games Website
