= Abd Rahman Yusof =

Malaysian politician (1956–2021)

- عبد الرحمن بن يوسف

Member of the Malaysian Parliament for Kemaman
- In office 29 November 1999 – 21 March 2004
- Preceded by: Ramli Taib (BN–UMNO)
- Succeeded by: Ahmad Shabery Cheek (BN–UMNO)
- Majority: 1,535 (1999)

Personal details
- Born: 24 August 1956 Kuala Terengganu, Terengganu, Federation of Malaya
- Died: 7 June 2021 (aged 64) Kuala Lumpur, Malaysia
- Citizenship: Malaysian
- Party: People's Justice Party (PKR)
- Other political affiliations: Pakatan Harapan (PH); Pakatan Rakyat (PR); Barisan Alternatif (BA)
- Occupation: Politician

Abd Rahman bin Yusof (24 August 1956 – 7 June 2021) was a Malaysian politician who served as a Member of Dewan Rakyat for Kemaman from 1999 to 2004. He was also a member of the People's Justice Party (PKR).

Yusof died on 7 June 2021.

== Election results ==
Parliament of Malaysia
Year	Constituency	Candidate	Votes	Pct	Opponent(s)	Votes	Pct	Ballots cast	Majority	Turnout
1999	P040 Kemaman	Abd Rahman Yusof (KeADILan)	20,715	51.92%	Wan Zaki Wan Muda (UMNO)	19,180	48.08%	40,878	1,535	80.76%
2004	P040 Kemaman	Abd Rahman Yusof (PKR)	20,635	35.1%	Ahmad Shabery Cheek (UMNO)	36,517	62.5%	58,461	15,882	88.02%
2018	P039 Dungun	Abd Rahman Yusof (PKR)	6,833	9.06%	Wan Hassan Mohd Ramli (PAS)	40,850	54.17%	76,706	13,119	84.79%
2018	P039 Dungun	Abd Rahman Yusof (PKR)	6,833	9.06%	Din Adam (UMNO)	27,731	36.77%	76,706	13,119	84.79%
