= 2023 Kemaman by-election =

By-election in Malaysia in 2023

← 2022	2 December 2023	Next →

P040 Kemaman seat in the Dewan Rakyat
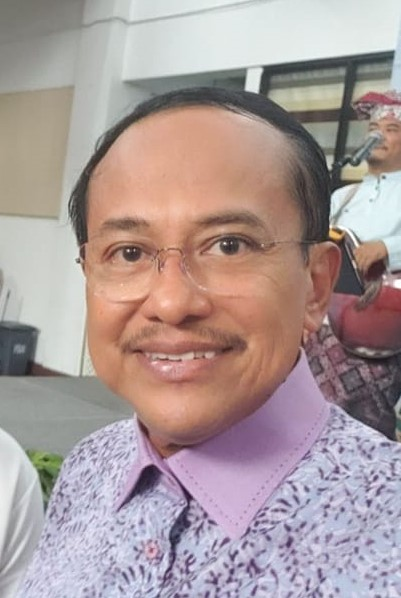

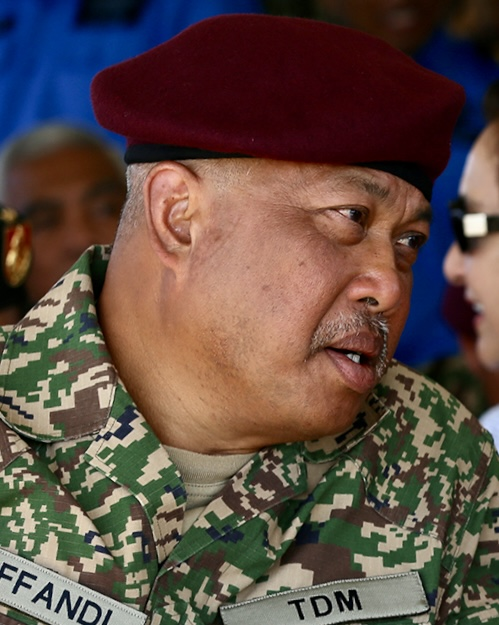
Candidate	Ahmad Samsuri Mokhtar	Raja Mohamed Affandi Raja Mohamed Noor
Party	PAS	Direct Member
Alliance	PN	BN
Popular vote	64,998	27,778
Percentage	70.06%	29.94%
MP before election
Che Alias Hamid (disqualified)
PN (PAS)
Elected MP
Ahmad Samsuri Mokhtar
PN (PAS)

The 2023 Kemaman by-election was a by-election that was held on Saturday, 2 December 2023 for the Dewan Rakyat seat of Kemaman. It was called following the disqualification of incumbent, Che Alias Hamid on 26 September 2023.

The election was the third federal by-election since GE15 after the Kuala Terengganu and Pulai by-elections that were held earlier the year. (Note: Not counting the federal by-election for Padang Serai and state by-election for Tioman, both which were delayed to 7 December 2022 because of death of respective candidates after nomination day for GE15. Both by-elections and results are considered as part of the 2022 general election and 2022 Pahang state election.) Ahmad Samsuri Mokhtar won by the majority of 37,220 votes.

== Background ==
Kemaman is a Malay/Muslim-majority seat comprising predominantly 94.1% of the overall voters, followed by 5.0% Chinese, 0.5% Indians and 0.4% of other ethnicities.

Che Alias, a member of the Malaysian Islamic Party (PAS) of Perikatan Nasional (PN) was first elected as the Member of Parliament (MP) for Kemaman in Terengganu defeating Ahmad Said of the United Malays National Organisation (UMNO) of Barisan Nasional (BN) coalition, Hasuni Sudin of the People's Justice Party (PKR) of Pakatan Harapan (PH) coalition and Rosli Abd Ghani of the Homeland Fighters Party (PEJUANG) of Gerakan Tanah Air (GTA) coalition by a majority of 27,179 votes in 2022 general election (GE15).

On 26 September 2023, the Terengganu Election Court annulled the results of the Kemaman seat in the 2022 general election. With this, Che Alias lost his seat and was disqualified as an MP with immediate effect. Judge Anselm Charles Fernandis ruled that the petitioner of BN Wan Mohamad Hisham Wan Abdul Jalil succeeded in proving that there had been elements of inducement of voters during the campaigning period of the election and corruption had taken place with the aim of influencing voters through programmes of fund distribution by the Terengganu state government in the election. He added that although the Terengganu state government was not in caretaker capacity and was allowed to work normally as the Terengganu State Legislative Assembly was dissolved and Terengganu state election was held separately in 2023, it did not mean the programmes should be held so close to the election. The court also ordered Che Alias to pay RM 30,000 to Wan Mohamad Hisham. Che Alias was represented by lawyers Wan Rohimi Wan Daud and Saifuddin Othman while Wan Mohamad Hisham was by lawyers Mohd Hafarizam Harun, Amin Othman and Norhazira Abu Haiyan. Hafarizam stressed that the Anselm had called the lead counsel of both parties into his chambers and informed them that he would notify the Election Commission (EC) of his ruling on a week later on 3 October 2023 if there was no appeal notice, indicating a decision on whether to file a notice of appeal should be made by that day and within a week. On 3 October 2023, Secretary-General of PAS Takiyuddin Hassan announced that Che Alias and PAS had decided against filing a notice of appeal to the Federal Court. Following that, the by-election was triggered.

== Nomination ==
On 3 October 2023, Deputy Prime Minister, Chairman of BN and President of UMNO Ahmad Zahid Hamidi stressed that it would be good for BN to test the electoral support for the coalition in Kemaman once again although the opposing PN has the advantage in the Malay-majority and rural areas like Kemaman and bring down the majority of PN in the by-election from its majority in the 2022 general election should it win.

On 13 November 2023, BN nominated former Chief of Defence Forces Raja Mohamed Affandi as its candidate. Affandi stands as a direct candidate, unaffiliated with any of the component parties within BN. Affandi is the first direct member to contest a by-election since Ramli Mohd Nor in the 2019 Cameron Highlands by-election although Ramli subsequently joined UMNO following his election.

On 16 November 2023, PN nominated Menteri Besar of Terengganu and Member of the Terengganu State Legislative Assembly (MLA) for Ru Rendang Ahmad Samsuri Mokhtar as its candidate.

On the nomination day, 18 November 2023, it was confirmed that there will be a straight fight between Affandi of BN and Samsuri of PN after nominations closed. As per the 2022 Malaysia general election in Terengganu and 2023 Terengganu state election, PN will use PAS' name and logo on its candidate, regardless of the candidate party.

== Timeline ==
The key dates are listed below.

Date	Event
26 September 2023	Che Alias Hamid was disqualified as an MP with immediate effect.
17 October 2023	Issue of the Writ of Election
18 November 2023	Nomination Day
18 November–1 December	Campaigning Period
28 November–1 December 2023	Early Polling Day For Postal, Overseas and Advance Voters
2 December 2023	Polling Day

== Results ==
Malaysian general by-election, 2 December 2023: Kemaman Upon the disqualification of the incumbent, Che Alias Hamid
Party	Candidate	Votes	%	∆%
PAS	Ahmad Samsuri Mokhtar	64,998	70.06	▲11.95
BN	Raja Mohamed Affandi Raja Mohamed Noor	27,778	29.94	▼4.13
Total valid votes		92,776	100.00	
Total rejected ballots		478		
Unreturned ballots		35		
Turnout		93,289	65.76	▼15.36
Registered electors		141,043		
Majority		37,220	40.12	▲16.08
PAS hold		Swing		
Source(s) https://lom.agc.gov.my/ilims/upload/portal/akta/outputp/1918066/PUB535_2023.pdf

== Previous results ==
Malaysian general election, 2022: Kemaman
Party	Candidate	Votes	%	∆%
PAS	Che Alias Hamid	65,714	58.11	+14.05
BN	Ahmad Said	38,535	34.07	-7.60
PH	Hasuni Sudin	8,340	7.37	-6.90
PEJUANG	Rosli Abd Ghani	506	0.45	+0.45
Total valid votes		113,095	100.00	
Total rejected ballots		1,288		
Unreturned ballots		150		
Turnout		114,553	81.12	
Registered electors		139,423		
Majority		27,179		
PAS hold		Swing		
Source(s) https://lom.agc.gov.my/ilims/upload/portal/akta/outputp/1753269/PUB608%20PARLIMEN%20TERENGGANU.pdf

== Aftermath ==
Ahamd Samsuri, the winner of the by-election, were sworn in as the new MP for Kemaman on 8 December, in Dewan Rakyat.
