= Raja Mohamed Affandi =

Malaysian senior military officer (born 1957)

Yang Mulia General (Rtd) Tan Sri Raja Mohamed Affandi Raja Mohamed Noor PGAT PMN PSM PJN SPMK SPMS SPMP SPKK SSAP DPPN SPDK SPMT SPTS DCSM PSAT DGMK DSAP DMPN DSDK PAT JSM SMZ KAT KMN PPS PPA PNBB PJM DPKT DUBC
- راج محمد أفندي
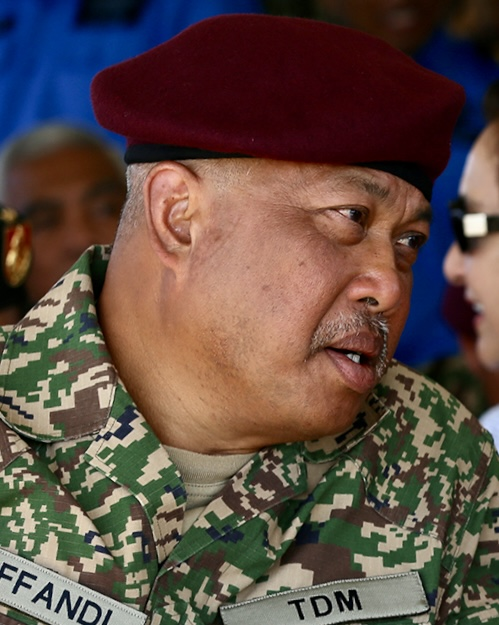
- General Affandi in 2014

19th Chief of Defence Forces
- In office 16 December 2016 – 19 June 2018
- Monarchs: Abdul Halim; Muhammad V
- Prime Minister: Najib Razak; Mahathir Mohamad
- Minister of Defence: Hishammuddin Hussein; Mohamad Sabu
- Preceded by: Zulkifeli Mohd Zin
- Succeeded by: Zulkifli Zainal Abidin

25th Chief of Army
- In office 15 June 2013 – 16 December 2016
- Preceded by: Zulkifli Zainal Abidin
- Succeeded by: Zulkiple Kassim

Personal details
- Born: Raja Mohamed Affandi bin Raja Mohamed Noor; 20 June 1957 (age 69) Besut, Terengganu, Federation of Malaya
- Spouse: Norlida Abdul Mubin
- Children: 4
- Education: MDef Studies; MSc Strat and Def Studies
- Alma mater: Royal Military College; University of New South Wales; Quaid-i-Azam University
- Occupation: Senior military officer
- Civilian awards: Commander of the Order of the Defender of the Realm (PMN)

Military service
- Allegiance: Malaysia; Yang di-Pertuan Agong
- Branch/service: Malaysian Army
- Years of service: 1977–2018
- Rank: General
- Unit: Royal Malay Regiment
- Commands: Army Basic Training Centre; 18th Battalion, Royal Malay Regiment; 3rd Division HQ; Army Planning & Development HQ; 2nd Division; Malaysian Armed Forces HQ
- Battles/wars: Second Malayan Emergency
- Military awards: Courageous Commander of the Order of Military Service (PGAT)
- Service number: 411967

Raja Mohamed Affandi bin Raja Mohamed Noor (Jawi: راج محمد أفندي بن راج محمد نور; born 20 June 1957) is a Malaysian former Chief of Army and Chief of Defence Force.

== Early life and education ==
Raja Mohamed Affandi was born into a family descended from the royal families of Perak, hence the prefix Yang Mulia ('His Highness') instead of Yang Berbahagia ('The Honorable'), on 20 June 1957 at Kampung Raja, Besut, Terengganu.

He received his primary education at Sekolah Kg Raja, Besut, and secondary education at Sekolah Menengah Sultan Ismail. He later attended Pre-Officer Cadet Training Unit (Pre-OCTU) at Sebatang Karah Camp, Port Dickson before continuing his training as Cadet Officer at Royal Military College, Sungai Besi. He was commissioned as Second Lieutenant (Malay: Leftenan Muda) on 11 May 1977 and assigned to the Royal Malay Regiment.

He continued his study while he was still in the service. He obtained Master in Defence Studies from University of New South Wales and Master of Science in Defence and Strategic Studies from Quaid-i-Azam University.

== Military career ==
General Tan Sri Raja Mohamed Affandi was directly involved in the Second Malayan Emergency during his early days as an army officer. He led his unit as platoon commander and later as company commander fighting with communist insurgents. He then became Aide-de-camp to Deputy Chief of Army, Lead Instructor at Army Basic Training Centre (Malay: Pusat Latihan Asas Tentera Darat — PUSASDA), Commander of 18th Battalion, Royal Malay Regiment (18 RAMD), Staff Officer 1 at National Operations Council (now National Security Council), Administration Staff Officer 1 at Army Human Resources Branch, chief-of-staff at 3rd Division Headquarters, assistant chief-of-staff at Army Planning and Development and Commander of 2nd Division.

He was promoted to Lieutenant General on 2 June 2008 and entrusted to hold Army Field Commander (Malay: Panglima Medan Tentera Darat) position. On 31 October 2009, he was assigned to chief-of-staff of Malaysian Armed Forces (Malay: Ketua Staf Angkatan Tentera Malaysia) post. He was then promoted to rank of general on 15 June 2013, and in the same time promoted to Chief of Army (Malay: Panglima Tentera Darat — PTD) position.

With his vast experience in the military and administration, he was promoted to the 19th Chief of Defence Forces on 16 December 2016, replacing General Zulkifeli Mohd Zain who retired from the Armed Forces.

== Retirement from Armed Forces ==
Raja Mohamed Affandi retired from armed forces on 20 June 2018. His position as Chief of Defence Forces is succeeded by General Tan Sri Zulkifli Zainal Abidin.

Raja Mohamed Affandi was named as BN's candidate for the Kemaman by-election. He lost by 37,220 votes.

== Personal life ==
General Tan Sri Dato' Sri Raja Mohamed Affandi is married to Puan Sri Datin Sri Norlida binti Hj Abdul Mubin and together they had three daughters and one son.

== Election results ==
Parliament of Malaysia
Year	Constituency	Candidate	Votes	Pct	Opponent(s)	Votes	Pct	Ballots cast	Majority	Turnout
2023	P040 Kemaman	Raja Mohamed Affandi Raja Mohamed Noor (BN)	27,798	29.94%	Ahmad Samsuri Mokhtar (PAS)	64,998	70.06%	92,776	37,220	65.76%

== Honours ==
=== Honours of Malaysia ===
- Malaysia
  - Commander of the Order of the Defender of the Realm (PMN) – Tan Sri (2017)
  - Commander of the Order of Loyalty to the Crown of Malaysia (PSM) – Tan Sri (2014)
  - Commander of the Order of Meritorious Service (PJN) – Datuk (2009)
  - Companion of the Order of Loyalty to the Crown of Malaysia (JSM) (2006)
  - Officer of the Order of the Defender of the Realm (KMN) (2002)
  - Recipient of the Loyal Service Medal (PPS)
  - Recipient of the General Service Medal (PPA)
  - Recipient of the United Nations Missions Service Medal (PNBB) with "MOZAMBIQUE" clasp
  - Recipient of the 12th Yang di-Pertuan Agong Installation Medal
  - Recipient of the 13th Yang di-Pertuan Agong Installation Medal
- Malaysian Armed Forces
  - Courageous Commander of the Most Gallant Order of Military Service (PGAT) (2013)
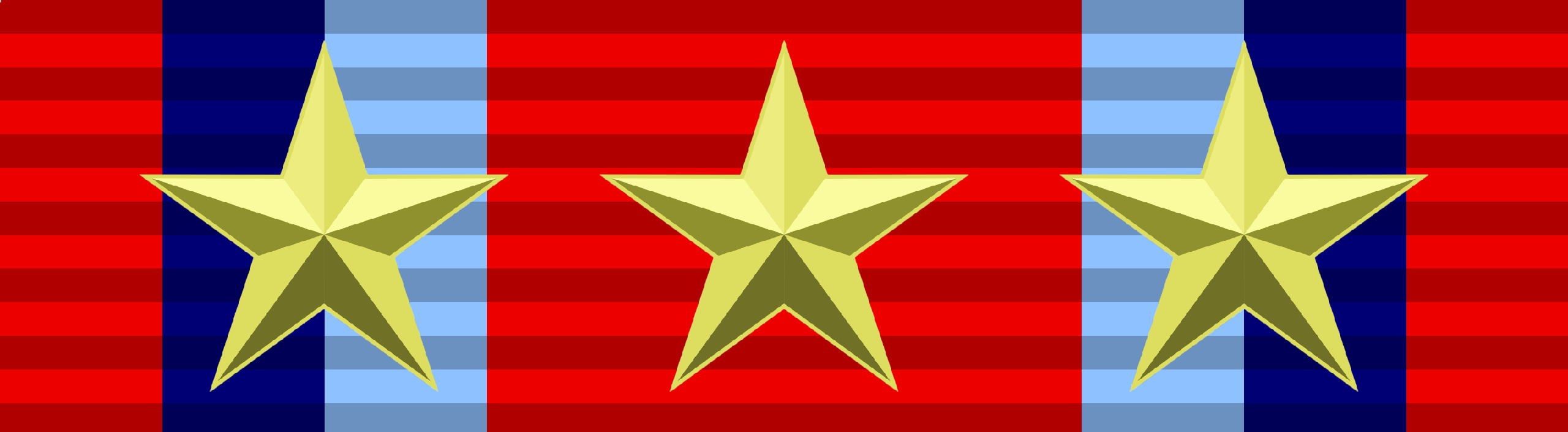
  - Loyal Commander of the Most Gallant Order of Military Service (PSAT)
  - Warrior of the Most Gallant Order of Military Service (PAT)
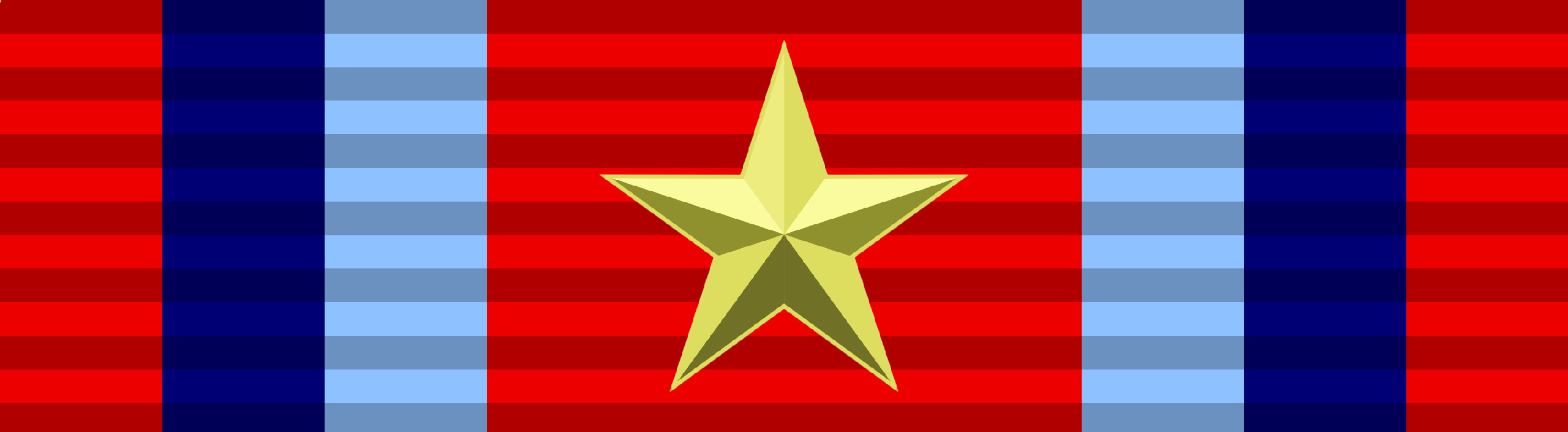
  - Officer of the Most Gallant Order of Military Service (KAT)
  - Recipient of the Malaysian Service Medal (PJM)
- Johor
  - Golden Jubilee of the Grup Gerak Khas Medal - Gold Medal
- Kedah
  - Knight Commander of the Glorious Order of the Crown of Kedah (DGMK) – Dato' Wira (2009)
  - Knight Companion of the Order of Loyalty to the Royal House of Kedah (DSDK) – Dato' (2008)
- Kelantan
  - Knight Grand Commander of the Order of the Crown of Kelantan (SPMK) – Dato' (2014)
  - Knight Grand Commander of the Order of the Noble Crown of Kelantan (SPKK) – Dato' (2009)
- Malacca
  - Knight Commander of the Exalted Order of Malacca (DCSM) – Datuk Wira (2014)
- Pahang
  - Knight Grand Companion of the Order of Sultan Ahmad Shah of Pahang (SSAP) – Dato' Sri (2013)
  - Knight Companion of the Order of Sultan Ahmad Shah of Pahang (DSAP) – Dato' (2006)
- Penang
  - Knight Commander of the Order of the Defender of State (DPPN) – Dato' Seri (2014)
  - Companion of the Order of the Defender of State (DMPN) – Dato' (2008)
- Perak
  - Knight Grand Commander of the Order of Taming Sari (SPTS) – Dato' Seri Panglima (2015)
- Perlis
  - Knight Grand Commander of the Order of the Crown of Perlis (SPMP) – Dato' Seri (2017)
- Sabah
  - Grand Commander of the Order of Kinabalu (SPDK) – Datuk Seri Panglima (2017)
- Selangor
  - Knight Grand Commander of the Order of the Crown of Selangor (SPMS) – Dato' Seri (2014)
- Terengganu
  - Knight Grand Commander of the Order of the Crown of Terengganu (SPMT) – Dato' (2011)
  - Companion of the Order of Sultan Mizan Zainal Abidin of Terengganu (SMZ) (2003)

=== Foreign honours ===
- Brunei
  - Order of Paduka Keberanian Laila Terbilang First Class (DPKT) – Dato Paduka Seri (2017)
- Singapore
  - Darjah Utama Bakti Cemerlang (Tentera) – (DUBC) (2018)
- United Nations
  - Recipient of the ONUMOZ Medal with "2" award numeral
