= Fariz Musa =

Malaysian politician (1970–2021)

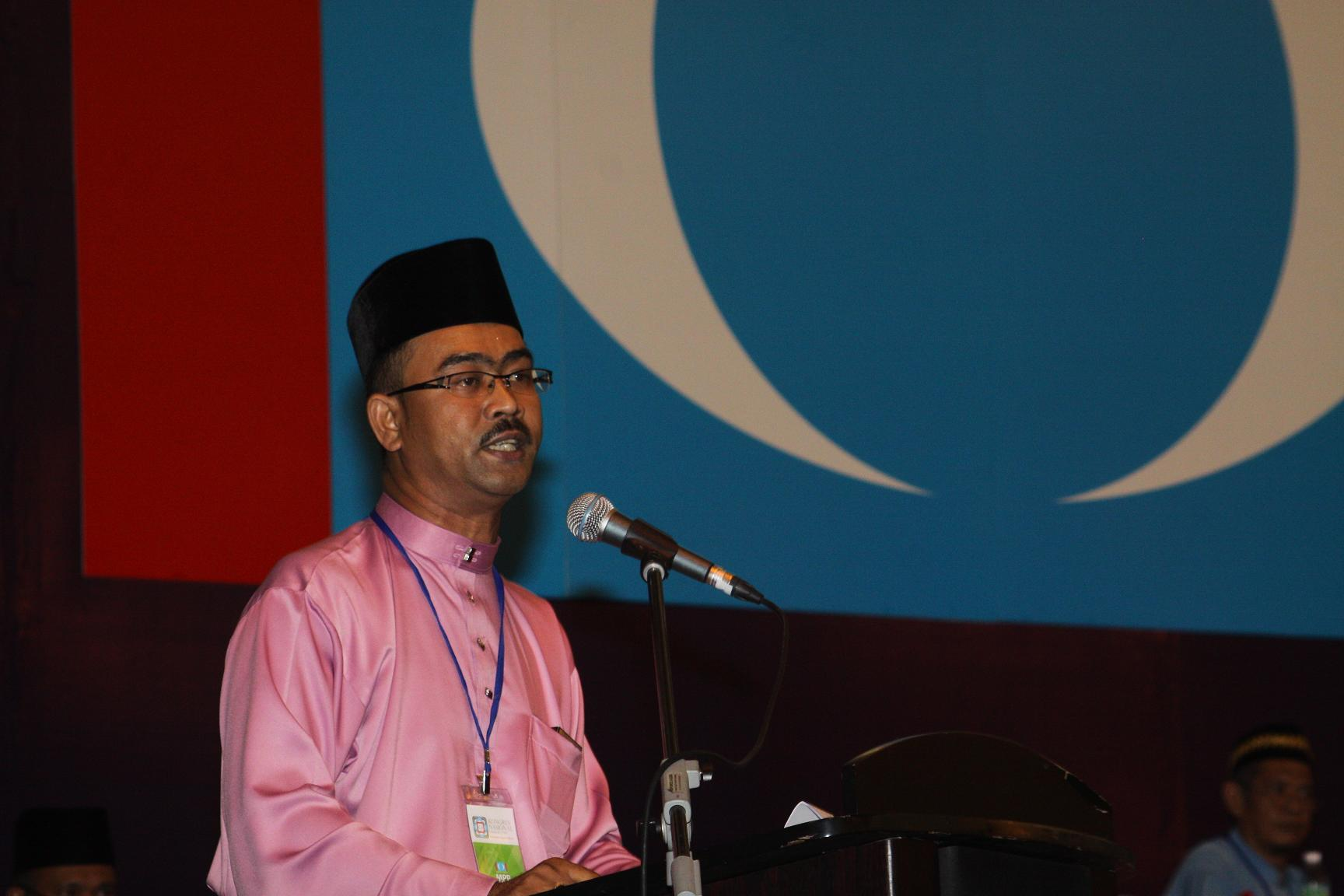
- Musa giving a speech to Parti Keadilan Rakyat supporters

Personal details
- Born: Mohd Fariz Abd Talib @ Musa; 1 March 1970 Kemaman, Terengganu, Malaysia
- Died: 27 December 2021 (aged 51) Kuala Terengganu, Terengganu, Malaysia
- Party: People's Justice Party (PKR)
- Other political affiliations: Pakatan Harapan (PH)
- Occupation: Politician

Fariz Musa (1 March 1970 – 27 December 2021) was a Malaysian politician. He was the Coordinator of the movement called Jingga 13, and served as National Deputy Chief and Terengganu State Chief of Angkatan Muda Keadilan (AMK), the youth wing in People's Justice Party (PKR), a component of Pakatan Harapan (PH) coalition.

== Career ==
Musa contested the 2008 General Election in the parliamentary seat of Kemaman, Terengganu but lost to the United Malays National Organisation (UMNO) candidate Ahmad Shabery Cheek.

In the 2013 General Election, Musa was selected by the de facto PKR leader, Anwar Ibrahim, to contest against the Prime Minister of Malaysia, Najib Razak, in the Pekan, Pahang parliamentary seat. He was defeated 51,278 to 15,665 (75.2% to 23.0%) on a voter turnout of 85.0%.

== Controversy ==
Musa was said to have attacked the Democratic Action Party (DAP) leadership as they were disowning the status quo in setting up candidates for the 13th General Election. He said that DAP do not understand the terms and condition of their Pakatan Rakyat (PR) union to capture the Putrajaya. This caused a dispute between the Pahang PKR and the Pahang DAP.

== Personal life and death ==
Musa was a native of Terengganu. He died from COVID-19 on 27 December 2021, at the age of 51.

== Election results ==
Parliament of Malaysia
Year	Constituency	Candidate	Votes	Pct	Opponent(s)	Votes	Pct	Ballots cast	Majority	Turnout
2008	P040 Kemaman	Fariz Musa (PKR)	24,516	39.72%	Ahmad Shabery Cheek (UMNO)	37,199	60.28%	62,868	12,683	83.82%
2013	P085 Pekan	Fariz Musa (PKR)	15,665	23.40%	Najib Razak (UMNO)	51,278	76.60%	68,464	35,613	85.30%
