= Kemaman (federal constituency) =

Federal constituency of Terengganu, Malaysia

Kemaman (P040)
Terengganu constituency

Federal constituency
- Legislature: Dewan Rakyat
- MP: Ahmad Samsuri Mokhtar; PN
- Constituency created: 1958
- First contested: 1959
- Last contested: 2023

Demographics
- Population (2020): 215,582
- Electors (2023): 141,790
- Area (km²): 2,540
- Pop. density (per km²): 84.9

Kemaman is a federal constituency in Kemaman District, Terengganu, Malaysia, that has been represented in the Dewan Rakyat since 1959.

The federal constituency was created in the 1958 redistribution and is mandated to return a single member to the Dewan Rakyat under the first past the post voting system.

== Demographics ==
https://live.chinapress.com.my/ge15/parliament/TERENGGANU

Ethnic breakdown of Kemaman's electorate as of 2022
1. Malay (94.1%)
2. Chinese (5.00%)
3. Indian (0.50%)
4. Other ethnicities (0.40%)
Age breakdown of Kemaman's electorate as of 2022
1. 18-20 (7.81%)
2. 21-29 (24.0%)
3. 30-39 (25.1%)
4. 40-49 (17.4%)
5. 50-59 (12.6%)
6. 60-69 (8.65%)
7. 70-79 (3.39%)
8. 80-89 (0.79%)
9. above 90 (0.17%)
Gender breakdown of Kemaman's electorate as of 2022
1. Male (50.6%)
2. Female (49.4%)

== History ==
=== Polling districts ===
According to the federal gazette issued on 18 July 2023, the Kemaman constituency is divided into 48 polling districts.

State constituency	Polling district	Code	Location
Kemasik (N29)	Batu Putih	040/29/01	SK Pengkalan Ranggon
Kemasik (N29)	FELDA Kertih 6	040/29/02	SK Ketengah Jaya
Kemasik (N29)	Kampung Ranggon	040/29/03	SK Pengkalan Ranggon
Kemasik (N29)	Kuala Kertih	040/29/04	SK Kerteh
Kemasik (N29)	Pekan Kertih	040/29/05	SK Seri Gelugor
Kemasik (N29)	Kemasik	040/29/06	SMK Badrul Alam Shah
Kemasik (N29)	Pekan Air Jernih	040/29/07	SK Ayer Jerneh
Kemasik (N29)	FELDA Kertih 5	040/29/08	SK Kg. Baru Rasau Kertih 5
Kemasik (N29)	Chabang	020/29/09	SK Kg Chabang
Kemasik (N29)	Tok Kaya	040/29/10	SK Kemasik
Kemasik (N29)	Rantau Petronas	040/29/11	SK Kg Baru Kerteh
Kijal (N30)	Padang Kubu	040/30/01	SK Padang Kubu
Kijal (N30)	Seri Bandi	040/30/02	SK Seri Bandi
Kijal (N30)	Ibok	040/30/03	SK Ibok
Kijal (N30)	Bukit Anak Dara	040/30/04	SK Bukit Anak Dara
Kijal (N30)	Pekan Kijal	040/30/05	SK Kijal
Kijal (N30)	Teluk Kalung	040/30/06	SK Telok Kalong
Kijal (N30)	Bukit Kuang	040/30/07	SK Bukit Kuang; SMK Bukit Kuang
Kijal (N30)	Payoh	040/30/08	SK Payoh
Kijal (N30)	Beris Meraga	040/30/09	SK Meraga Beris
Cukai (N31)	Bakau Tinggi	040/31/01	SMK Sultan Ismail
Cukai (N31)	Kampung Besut	040/31/02	SK Seri Kemaman
Cukai (N31)	Kampung Tuan	040/31/03	SK Chukai
Cukai (N31)	Gong Limau	040/31/04	SK Seri Iman
Cukai (N31)	Gong Pauh	040/31/05	SMK Bukit Mentok
Cukai (N31)	Kubang Kurus	040/31/06	SMK Chukai
Cukai (N31)	Banggul	040/31/07	SMK Chukai
Cukai (N31)	Kampung Tengah	040/31/08	SK Chukai
Cukai (N31)	Kuala Kemaman	040/31/09	SK Kuala Kemaman
Cukai (N31)	Geliga	040/31/10	SMK Geliga
Cukai (N31)	Jakar	040/31/11	SJK (C) Chukai
Cukai (N31)	Fikri	040/31/12	SK Mak Lagam
Cukai (N31)	Paya Berenjut	040/31/13	SMK Banggol
Cukai (N31)	Geliga Besar	040/31/14	SK Seri Geliga
Air Putih (N32)	Mak Chili	040/32/01	SK Pusat
Air Putih (N32)	Bukit Mentok	040/32/02	SK Bukit Mentok
Air Putih (N32)	Pasir Minal	040/32/03	SK Seri Jaya
Air Putih (N32)	Binjai	040/32/04	SK Binjai; Kolej Vokesional Kemaman
Air Putih (N32)	Pasir Gajah	040/32/05	SK Pasir Gajah
Air Putih (N32)	Seberang Tayur	040/32/06	SK RKT Seberang Tayor
Air Putih (N32)	Dadung	040/32/07	SMK Ayer Puteh
Air Putih (N32)	Air Putih	040/32/08	SK Ayer Puteh
Air Putih (N32)	Bandar Cerul	040/32/09	SK (FELDA) Cherul
Air Putih (N32)	Bandar Baru Cenih	040/32/10	SMK Cheneh Baru
Air Putih (N32)	Sungai Peragam	040/32/11	SK Sungai Pergam
Air Putih (N32)	FELDA Neram 1	040/32/12	SK FELDA Neram Satu; SK Kampong Baharu FELDA Neram I
Air Putih (N32)	Hulu Jabur	040/32/13	SK Lembah Jabor
Air Putih (N32)	FELDA Neram 2	040/32/14	SK Cheneh Baru

=== Representation history ===
Members of Parliament for Kemaman
Parliament	No	Years	Member	Party	Vote Share
Constituency created from Trengganu Selatan
Parliament of the Federation of Malaya
1st	P029	1959–1963	Wan Yahya Wan Mohamed (وان يحي وان محمد)	Alliance (UMNO)	Uncontested
Parliament of Malaysia
1st	P029	1963–1964	Wan Yahya Wan Mohamed (وان مختار وان أحمد)	Alliance (UMNO)	Uncontested
2nd	P029	1964–1969	Wan Mokhtar Ahmad (وان مختار وان أحمد)	Alliance (UMNO)	10,153; 64.20%
		1969–1971	Parliament was suspended		
3rd	P029	1971–1973	Wan Mokhtar Ahmad (وان مختار وان أحمد)	Alliance (UMNO)	9,428; 52.49%
3rd	P029	1973–1974	Wan Mokhtar Ahmad (وان مختار وان أحمد)	BN (UMNO)	9,428; 52.49%
4th	P034	1974–1976	Wan Abdul Kadir Ismail (وان عبدالقادر اسماعيل)	BN (UMNO)	12,418; 70.53%
4th	P034	1976–1978	Abdul Manan Othman (عبدالمانن عثمان)	BN (UMNO)	11,204; 60.59%
5th	P034	1978–1982	Ismail @ Mansor Said (اسماعيل منصور سعيد)	BN (UMNO)	14,180; 64.76%
6th	P034	1982–1986	Ismail @ Mansor Said (اسماعيل منصور سعيد)	BN (UMNO)	16,582; 62.50%
7th	P037	1986–1990	Ismail @ Mansor Said (اسماعيل منصور سعيد)	BN (UMNO)	16,662; 69.62%
8th	P037	1990–1995	Ismail @ Mansor Said (اسماعيل منصور سعيد)	BN (UMNO)	21,239; 64.30%
9th	P040	1995–1999	Ramli Taib (راملي طائب)	BN (UMNO)	21,999; 60.56%
10th	P040	1999–2004	Abd Rahman Yusof (عبد رحمن يوسف)	BA (keADILan)	20,715; 51.92%
11th	P040	2004–2008	Ahmad Shabery Cheek (احمد شابيري چيايك)	BN (UMNO)	36,516; 63.89%
12th	P040	2008–2013	Ahmad Shabery Cheek (احمد شابيري چيايك)	BN (UMNO)	37,199; 60.28%
13th	P040	2013–2018	Ahmad Shabery Cheek (احمد شابيري چيايك)	BN (UMNO)	45,525; 57.81%
14th	P040	2018–2020	Che Alias Hamid (چي الياس حميد)	GS (PAS)	39,878; 44.06%
14th	P040	2020–2022	Che Alias Hamid (چي الياس حميد)	PN (PAS)	39,878; 44.06%
15th	P040	2022–2023	Che Alias Hamid (چي الياس حميد)	PN (PAS)	65,714; 58.11%
15th	P040	2023–present	Ahmad Samsuri Mokhtar (أحمد سمسوري مختار)	PN (PAS)	64,998; 70.06%

=== State constituency ===
Parliamentary constituency	State constituency						
Parliamentary constituency	1954–1959*	1959–1974	1974–1986	1986–1995	1995–2004	2004–2018	2018–present
Kemaman					Air Putih		
Kemaman			Bukit Bandi				
Kemaman		Chukai					
Kemaman				Cukai			
Kemaman		Kemaman Selatan					
Kemaman		Kemaman Utara					
Kemaman			Kemasek				
Kemaman				Kemasik			
Kemaman				Kijal			
Kemaman			Paka				
Kemaman		Paka-Kerteh					

=== Historical boundaries ===
State Constituency	Area					
State Constituency	1959	1974	1984	1994	2003	2018
Air Putih				Alam Perdana; Binjai; Bukit Mentok; Cheneh; FELDA Neram		
Bukit Bandi		Binjai; Bukit Mentok; Cheneh; FELDA Neram; Kampung Telok Kalong	Bukit Bandi; Binjai; Bukit Mentok; Cheneh; FELDA Neram			
Cukai	Bukit Mengkuang; Chukai; Kampung Teluk Kalong; Kemaman; Taman Jakar	Chukai; Gong Pauh; Kampung Bakau Tinggi; Kampung Jaya; Kemaman		Chukai; Gong Pauh; Kemaman; Mak Langam; Taman Gelasa Sempadan		
Kemaman Selatan	Binjai; Bukit Mentok; Cheneh; FELDA Neram; Kampung Besut					
Kemaman Utara	FELDA Kertih 5 & 6; Kampung Labohan; Kampung Semayor; Kemasik; Kijal					
Kemasik		FELDA Kertih 5 & 6; Kampung Labohan; Kemasik; Kerteh; Kijal	Air Jerneh; FELDA Kertih 5 & 6; Kampung Batu Putih; Kemasik; Kerteh			
Kijal			Kampung Bukit Teruna; Kampung Ibok; Kampung Teluk Kalong; Kijal; Lubuk Gayung			
Paka		Al-Muktafi Billah Shah; Cenerih; Kampung Durian Mentangau; Kampung Sura Tengah; Paka				
Paka-Kerteh	Al-Muktafi Billah Shah; Cenerih; Kampung Sura Tengah; Kerteh; Paka					

=== Current state assembly members ===
No.	State Constituency	Member	Coalition (Party)
N29	Kemasik	Saiful Azmi Suhaili	PN (PAS)
N30	Kijal	Razali Idris	PN (BERSATU)
N31	Cukai	Hanafiah Mat	PN (PAS)
N32	Air Putih	Mohd Hafiz Adam	PN (PAS)

=== Local governments & postcodes ===
No.	State Constituency	Local Government	Postcode
N29	Kemasik	Kemaman Municipal Council	24000 Cukai; 24050 Ayer Puteh; 24060 Ceneh; 24100 Kijal; 24200 Kemasik; 24300 Kerteh
N30	Kijal	Kemaman Municipal Council	24000 Cukai; 24050 Ayer Puteh; 24060 Ceneh; 24100 Kijal; 24200 Kemasik; 24300 Kerteh
N31	Cukai	Kemaman Municipal Council	24000 Cukai; 24050 Ayer Puteh; 24060 Ceneh; 24100 Kijal; 24200 Kemasik; 24300 Kerteh
N32	Air Putih	Kemaman Municipal Council	24000 Cukai; 24050 Ayer Puteh; 24060 Ceneh; 24100 Kijal; 24200 Kemasik; 24300 Kerteh

== Election results ==
Malaysian general by-election, 2 December 2023 Upon the disqualification of the incumbent, Che Alias Hamid
Party	Candidate	Votes	%	∆%
PAS	Ahmad Samsuri Mokhtar	64,998	70.06	▲11.95
BN	Raja Mohamed Affandi Raja Mohamed Noor	27,778	29.94	▼4.13
Total valid votes		92,776	100.00	
Total rejected ballots		478		
Unreturned ballots		35		
Turnout		93,289	65.76	▼15.36
Registered electors		141,043		
Majority		37,220	40.12	▲16.08
PAS hold		Swing		
Source(s) https://lom.agc.gov.my/ilims/upload/portal/akta/outputp/1918066/PUB535_2023.pdf

Malaysian general election, 2022
Party	Candidate	Votes	%	∆%
PAS	Che Alias Hamid	65,714	58.11	▲14.05
BN	Ahmad Said	38,535	34.07	▼7.60
PH	Hasuni Sudin	8,340	7.37	▲7.37
PEJUANG	Rosli Abd Ghani	506	0.45	▲0.45
Total valid votes		113,095	100.00	
Total rejected ballots		1,288		
Unreturned ballots		150		
Turnout		114,553	81.12	▼4.39
Registered electors		139,423		
Majority		27,179	24.04	▲21.65
PAS hold		Swing		
Source(s) https://lom.agc.gov.my/ilims/upload/portal/akta/outputp/1753269/PUB608%20PARLIMEN%20TERENGGANU.pdf

Malaysian general election, 2018
Party	Candidate	Votes	%	∆%
PAS	Che Alias Hamid	39,878	44.06	▲44.06
BN	Ahmad Shabery Cheek	37,715	41.67	▼16.14
PKR	Mohd Huzaifah Md Suhaimi	12,911	14.27	▼27.92
Total valid votes		90,504	100.00	
Total rejected ballots		1,126		
Unreturned ballots		377		
Turnout		92,007	85.51	▼1.68
Registered electors		107,593		
Majority		2,163	2.39	▼13.23
PAS gain from BN		Swing		?
Source(s) "His Majesty's Government Gazette - Notice of Contested Election, Parliament for the State of Terengganu [P.U. (B) 235/2018]" (PDF). Attorney General's Chambers of Malaysia. 3 May 2018. "Federal Government Gazette - Results of Contested Election and Statements of the Poll after the Official Addition of Votes, Parliamentary Constituencies for the State of Terengganu [P.U. (B) 309/2018]" (PDF). Attorney General's Chambers of Malaysia. 28 May 2018.

Malaysian general election, 2013
Party	Candidate	Votes	%	∆%
BN	Ahd Shabery Cheek	45,525	57.81	▼2.47
PKR	Kamarudin Chik	33,219	42.19	▲2.47
Total valid votes		78,744	100.00	
Total rejected ballots		1,227		
Unreturned ballots		197		
Turnout		80,168	87.19	▲3.37
Registered electors		91,942		
Majority		12,306	15.62	▼4.94
BN hold		Swing		
Source(s) "Federal Government Gazette - Notice of Contested Election, Parliament for the State of Terengganu [P.U. (B) 172/2013]" (PDF). Attorney General's Chambers of Malaysia. 26 April 2013. "Federal Government Gazette - Results of Contested Election and Statements of the Poll after the Official Addition of Votes, Parliamentary Constituencies for the State of Terengganu [P.U. (B) 213/2013]" (PDF). Attorney General's Chambers of Malaysia. 22 May 2013.

Malaysian general election, 2008
Party	Candidate	Votes	%	∆%
BN	Ahd Shabery Cheek	37,199	60.28	▼3.61
PKR	Mohd. Fariz Abd. Talib @ Musa	24,516	39.72	▲3.61
Total valid votes		61,715	100.00	
Total rejected ballots		1,077		
Unreturned ballots		76		
Turnout		62,868	83.82	▼4.20
Registered electors		75,006		
Majority		12,683	20.56	▼7.22
BN hold		Swing		

Malaysian general election, 2004
Party	Candidate	Votes	%	∆%
BN	Ahd Shabery Cheek	36,517	63.89	▲15.81
PKR	Abdul Rahman Yusof	20,635	36.11	▼15.81
Total valid votes		57,152	100.00	
Total rejected ballots		1,036		
Unreturned ballots		273		
Turnout		58,461	88.02	▲7.26
Registered electors		66,417		
Majority		15,882	27.78	▲23.94
BN gain from PKR		Swing		?

Malaysian general election, 1999
Party	Candidate	Votes	%	∆%
PKR	Abdul Rahman Yusof	20,715	51.92	▲51.92
BN	Wan Zaki Wan Muda	19,180	48.08	▼12.48
Total valid votes		39,895	100.00	
Total rejected ballots		902		
Unreturned ballots		81		
Turnout		40,878	80.76	▲0.78
Registered electors		50,616		
Majority		1,535	3.84	▼17.28
PKR gain from BN		Swing		?

Malaysian general election, 1995
Party	Candidate	Votes	%	∆%
BN	Ramli Taib	21,999	60.56	▼3.74
S46	Alias Abdul Rahman	14,328	39.44	▲3.74
Total valid votes		36,327	100.00	
Total rejected ballots		1,367		
Unreturned ballots		88		
Turnout		37,782	79.98	▼1.17
Registered electors		47,239		
Majority		7,671	21.12	▼7.48
BN hold		Swing		

Malaysian general election, 1990
Party	Candidate	Votes	%	∆%
BN	Ismail @ Mansor Said	21,239	64.30	▼5.32
S46	Ahd Shabery Cheek	11,793	35.70	▲35.70
Total valid votes		33,032	100.00	
Total rejected ballots		872		
Unreturned ballots		0		
Turnout		33,904	81.15	▲6.38
Registered electors		41,781		
Majority		9,446	28.60	▼10.64
BN hold		Swing		

Malaysian general election, 1986
Party	Candidate	Votes	%	∆%
BN	Ismail @ Mansor Said	16,662	69.62	▲7.12
PAS	Mohamad @ Harun Jusoh	7,270	30.38	▼7.12
Total valid votes		23,932	100.00	
Total rejected ballots		692		
Unreturned ballots		0		
Turnout		24,623	74.77	▼1.39
Registered electors		32,931		
Majority		9,392	39.24	▲14.24
BN hold		Swing		

Malaysian general election, 1982
Party	Candidate	Votes	%	∆%
BN	Ismail @ Mansor Said	16,582	62.50	▼2.26
PAS	Ahmad Subki Abd. Latif @ Subky Abd. Latif	9,950	37.50	▲2.26
Total valid votes		26,532	100.00	
Total rejected ballots		1,240		
Unreturned ballots		0		
Turnout		27,772	76.16	
Registered electors		36,467		
Majority		6,632	25.00	▼4.52
BN hold		Swing		

Malaysian general election, 1978
Party	Candidate	Votes	%	∆%
BN	Ismail @ Mansor Said	14,180	64.76	▲4.17
PAS	Wan Musa Omar	7,715	35.24	▲35.24
Total valid votes		21,895	100.00	
Total rejected ballots		1,074		
Unreturned ballots		0		
Turnout		22,969	74.40	
Registered electors		30,872		
Majority		6,465	29.52	▲8.34
BN hold		Swing		

Malaysian general by-election, 8 May 1976 Upon the death of incumbent, Wan Abdul Kadir Ismail
Party	Candidate	Votes	%	∆%
BN	Abdul Manan Othman	11,204	60.59	▼9.94
Parti Sosialis Rakyat Malaysia	Kassim Ahmad	7,286	39.41	▲9.94
Total valid votes		18,490	100.00	
Total rejected ballots				
Unreturned ballots				
Turnout				
Registered electors				
Majority		3,918	21.18	▼19.88
BN hold		Swing		

Malaysian general election, 1974
Party	Candidate	Votes	%	∆%
BN	Wan Abdul Kadir Ismail	12,418	70.53	▲70.53
Parti Rakyat Malaysia	Syed Shafie Tuan Baharu	5,189	29.47	▲29.47
Total valid votes		17,607	100.00	
Total rejected ballots		1,168		
Unreturned ballots		0		
Turnout		18,775	71.63	▼1.61
Registered electors		26,373		
Majority		7,229	41.06	▲36.08
BN gain from Alliance		Swing		?

Malaysian general election, 1969
Party	Candidate	Votes	%	∆%
Alliance	Wan Mokhtar Ahmad	9,428	52.49	▼11.71
PMIP	Wan Yahya Wan Mohamed	8,534	47.51	▲31.14
Total valid votes		17,962	100.00	
Total rejected ballots		910		
Unreturned ballots		0		
Turnout		18,872	70.02	▼5.19
Registered electors		26,953		
Majority		894	4.98	▼39.79
Alliance hold		Swing		

Malaysian general election, 1964
Party	Candidate	Votes	%	∆%
Alliance	Wan Mokhtar Ahmad	10,153	64.20	▲64.20
Socialist Front	Wan Hamid Wan Ibrahim	3,072	19.43	▲19.43
PMIP	Syed Noh Alwee	2,589	16.37	▲16.37
Total valid votes		15,814	100.00	
Total rejected ballots		742		
Unreturned ballots		0		
Turnout		16,556	75.21	
Registered electors		22,013		
Majority		7,081	44.77	
Alliance hold		Swing		

Malayan general election, 1959
Party	Candidate	Votes	%
On the nomination day, Wan Yahya Wan Mohamed won uncontested.
Alliance	Wan Yahya Wan Mohamed		
Total valid votes			100.00
Total rejected ballots			
Unreturned ballots			
Turnout			
Registered electors		17,734	
Majority			
This was a new constituency created.
