= Ahmad Shabery Cheek =

Malaysian politician

Yang Berbahagia Dato' Sri Ahmad Shabery Cheek SSAP DPMT SMT
- احمد صبري چئ
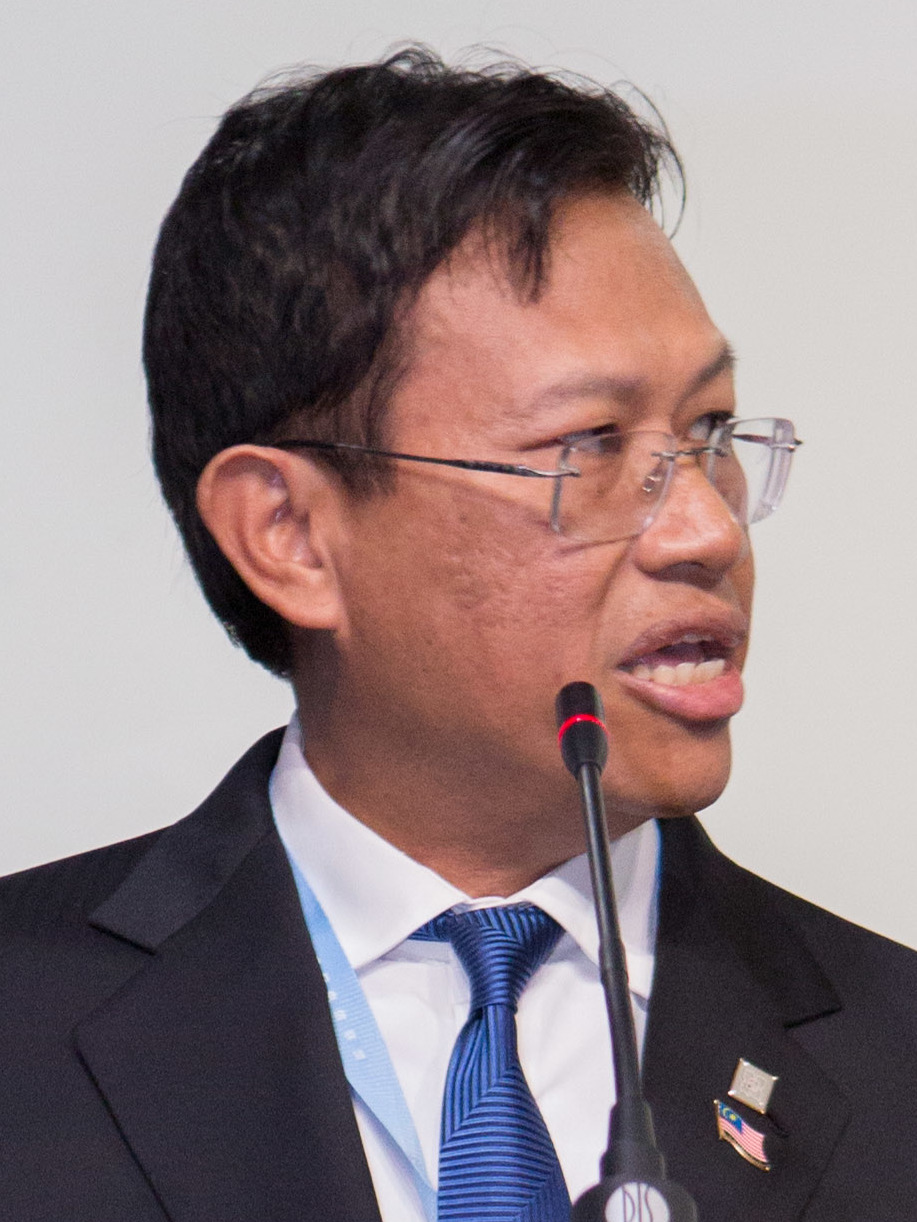

Chairman of the Federal Land Development Authority
- Incumbent
- Assumed office 1 July 2023
- Monarchs: Abdullah (2023–2024); Ibrahim (since 2024)
- Prime Minister: Anwar Ibrahim
- Minister: Rafizi Ramli
- Director-General: Amiruddin Abdul Satar
- Preceded by: Idris Jusoh

Minister of Agriculture and Agro-based Industry
- In office 28 July 2015 – 10 May 2018
- Monarchs: Abdul Halim (2015–2016); Muhammad V (2016–2018)
- Prime Minister: Najib Razak
- Deputy: Tajuddin Abdul Rahman; Anthony Nogeh Gumbek
- Preceded by: Ismail Sabri Yaakob
- Succeeded by: Salahuddin Ayub
- Constituency: Kemaman

Minister of Communications and Multimedia
- In office 16 May 2013 – 28 July 2015
- Monarch: Abdul Halim
- Prime Minister: Najib Razak
- Deputy: Jailani Johari
- Preceded by: Rais Yatim (Minister of Information, Communications and Culture)
- Succeeded by: Salleh Said Keruak
- Constituency: Kemaman
- In office 19 March 2008 – 8 April 2009
- Monarch: Mizan Zainal Abidin
- Prime Minister: Abdullah Ahmad Badawi
- Deputy: Tan Lian Hoe; Joseph Salang Gandum
- Preceded by: Zainuddin Maidin
- Succeeded by: Rais Yatim (Minister of Information, Communications, Arts and Culture)
- Constituency: Kemaman

Minister of Youth and Sports
- In office 10 April 2008 – 15 May 2013
- Monarchs: Mizan Zainal Abidin (2008–2011); Abdul Halim (2011–2013)
- Prime Minister: Abdullah Ahmad Badawi; Najib Razak
- Deputy: Razali Ibrahim (2008–2013); Wee Jeck Seng (2009–2011); Gan Ping Sieu (2011–2013)
- Preceded by: Ismail Sabri Yaakob
- Succeeded by: Khairy Jamaluddin
- Constituency: Kemaman

Parliamentary Secretary of Foreign Affairs
- In office 2006–2008
- Monarch: Mizan Zainal Abidin
- Prime Minister: Abdullah Ahmad Badawi
- Minister: Rais Yatim
- Constituency: Kemaman

Member of the Malaysian Parliament for Kemaman
- In office 21 March 2004 – 9 May 2018
- Preceded by: Abd Rahman Yusof (PKR)
- Succeeded by: Che Alias Hamid (PAS)
- Majority: 15,882 (2004); 12,683 (2008); 12,306 (2013)

Faction represented in Dewan Rakyat
- 2004–2018: Barisan Nasional

Personal details
- Born: Ahmad Shabery bin Cheek; 10 December 1958 (age 67) Kemaman, Terengganu, Federation of Malaya (now Malaysia)
- Citizenship: Malaysian
- Party: United Malays National Organisation (UMNO) (–1989, since 1996); Parti Melayu Semangat 46 (S46) (1989–1996)
- Other political affiliations: Angkatan Perpaduan Ummah (APU) (1990–1996); Gagasan Rakyat (GR) (1990–1996); Barisan Nasional (BN) (–1989, since 1996)
- Spouse: Che Sharifah Ismail
- Education: University of Malaya (Bachelor's degree (economics)); University of Leeds (Master's degree (political science))
- Occupation: Politician

Ahmad Shabery bin Cheek (Jawi: احمد صبري بن چئ; born 10 December 1958) is a Malaysian politician who has served as Chairman of the Federal Land Development Authority (FELDA) since July 2023. He served as Minister of Agriculture and Agro-based Industry, Minister of Communications and Multimedia, Minister of Youth and Sports and Parliamentary Secretary of Foreign Affairs in the Barisan Nasional (BN) administration under former Prime Ministers Abdullah Ahmad Badawi and Najib Razak as well as former Minister Rais Yatim from 2006 to the collapse of the BN administration in May 2018. He also served as the Member of Parliament (MP) for Kemaman from March 2004 to May 2018. He is a member of the United Malays National Organisation (UMNO), a component party of the BN coalition and was a member of the Parti Melayu Semangat 46 (S46), a component party of the Angkatan Perpaduan Ummah (APU) and Gagasan Rakyat (GR) coalitions. He was also Member of the Supreme Council of UMNO.

== Education and early career ==
Ahmad Shabery was born in Kijal, Kemaman, Terengganu on 10 December 1958 and received his early education in both Sekolah Sungai Lembing, Kuantan (primary) as well as in Sekolah Datuk Abdul Razak, Seremban (secondary).

In 1983, he pursued a course in economics at Universiti Malaya and graduated with a bachelor's degree. During this period, he was also elected as the president of the university's Muslim Students Association. In 1986, he obtained his master's degree from the University of Leeds and in 1989, he obtained a postgraduate diploma in International Relations from the Uppsala University in Sweden. That same year, he was appointed the Secretary of the Malaysian Social Science Association (PSSM).

In 1990, he became a lecturer in the University Malaya's Faculty of Economics and Administration. He has also served as a Research Fellow at the Institute of Southeast Asian Studies in Singapore.

== Political career ==
Ahmad Shabery left UMNO in 1989 to join other members rebelling against the then-Prime Minister Mahathir Mohamad in the newly formed breakaway Parti Melayu Semangat 46 (S46), until its dissolution in 1996 where he rejoined UMNO again.

In 2004, he was elected as the Member of Parliament for Kemaman, defeating incumbent Abd Rahman Yusof of the People's Justice Party (PKR) by 15,882 votes. In 2008, he retained the seat after beating PKR's Fariz Musa by 12,682 votes, and won again in 2013, defeating Kamaruddin Chik (PKR) by 12,306 votes. But in the 2018 general election, he lost the parliamentary seat.

After the 12th general elections in 2008, which saw the incumbent Information Minister Zainuddin Maidin lose his parliamentary seat, the then-Prime Minister Abdullah Ahmad Badawi appointed Ahmad as Zainuddin's replacement.

In April 2009, he was appointed as Minister of Youth and Sports in a minor cabinet reshuffle.

On 15 July 2008, Ahmad Shabery Cheek participated in a historic debate on the national fuel price with then-opposition leader Anwar Ibrahim, which was televised live.

After the 13th general elections in 2013, he was appointed as Minister of Communications and Multimedia for a second time round, after holding the same position in 2008 under a differently named portfolio known as the Ministry of Information.

In 2015, he was appointed as the Minister of Agriculture and Agro-based Industry in a cabinet reshuffle. When he and BN lost in the 2018 general election, he was replaced by Salahuddin Ayub from the Pakatan Harapan (PH) new government.

=== Chairman of the Federal Land Development Authority (since 2023) ===
On 28 June 2023, Ahmad Shabery was declared the new Chairman of FELDA succeeding Idris Jusoh. His appointment took effect on 1 July 2023. His appointment was welcomed positively, in which it marked as an enabler of the progress for the transformation efforts of FELDA to benefit both the existing and new generations of settlers.

== Election results ==
Parliament of Malaysia
Year	Constituency	Candidate	Votes	Pct	Opponent(s)	Votes	Pct	Ballots cast	Majority	Turnout
1990	P037 Kemaman	Ahmad Shabery Cheek (S46)	11,793	34.80%	Ismail Said (UMNO)	21,239	62.60%	33,904	9,446	81.15%
1995	P075 Lipis	Ahmad Shabery Cheek (S46)	8,394	31.20%	Abu Dahari Osman (UMNO)	18,507	68.80%	29,011	10,113	68.49%
2004	P040 Kemaman	Ahmad Shabery Cheek (UMNO)	36,517	63.89%	Abd Rahman Yusof (PKR)	20,635	36.11%	58,461	15,882	88.02%
2008	P040 Kemaman	Ahmad Shabery Cheek (UMNO)	37,199	60.28%	Mohd Fariz Abd Talib @ Musa (PKR)	24,516	39.72%	62,868	12,683	83.82%
2013	P040 Kemaman	Ahmad Shabery Cheek (UMNO)	45,525	57.81%	Kamarudin Chik (PKR)	33,219	42.19%	80,168	12,306	87.19%
2018	P040 Kemaman	Ahmad Shabery Cheek (UMNO)	37,715	41.67%	Che Alias Hamid (PAS)	39,878	44.06%	90,504	2,163	84.12%
2018	P040 Kemaman	Ahmad Shabery Cheek (UMNO)	37,715	41.67%	Mohd Huzaifah Md Suhaimi (PKR)	12,911	14.27%	90,504	2,163	84.12%

== Honours ==
- Terengganu
  - Companion of the Order of the Crown of Terengganu (SMT) (2005)
  - Knight Commander of the Order of the Crown of Terengganu (DPMT) – Dato' (2007)
- Pahang
  - Grand Knight of the Order of Sultan Ahmad Shah of Pahang (SSAP) – Dato' Sri (2010)

== See also ==
- Kemaman (federal constituency)
