= Ahmad Samsuri Mokhtar =

Malaysian politician, aerospace engineer and lecturer

Yang Amat Berhormat Dato' Seri Ir. Dr. Ahmad Samsuri Mokhtar SSMZ MP MLA
- أحمد سمسوري مختار
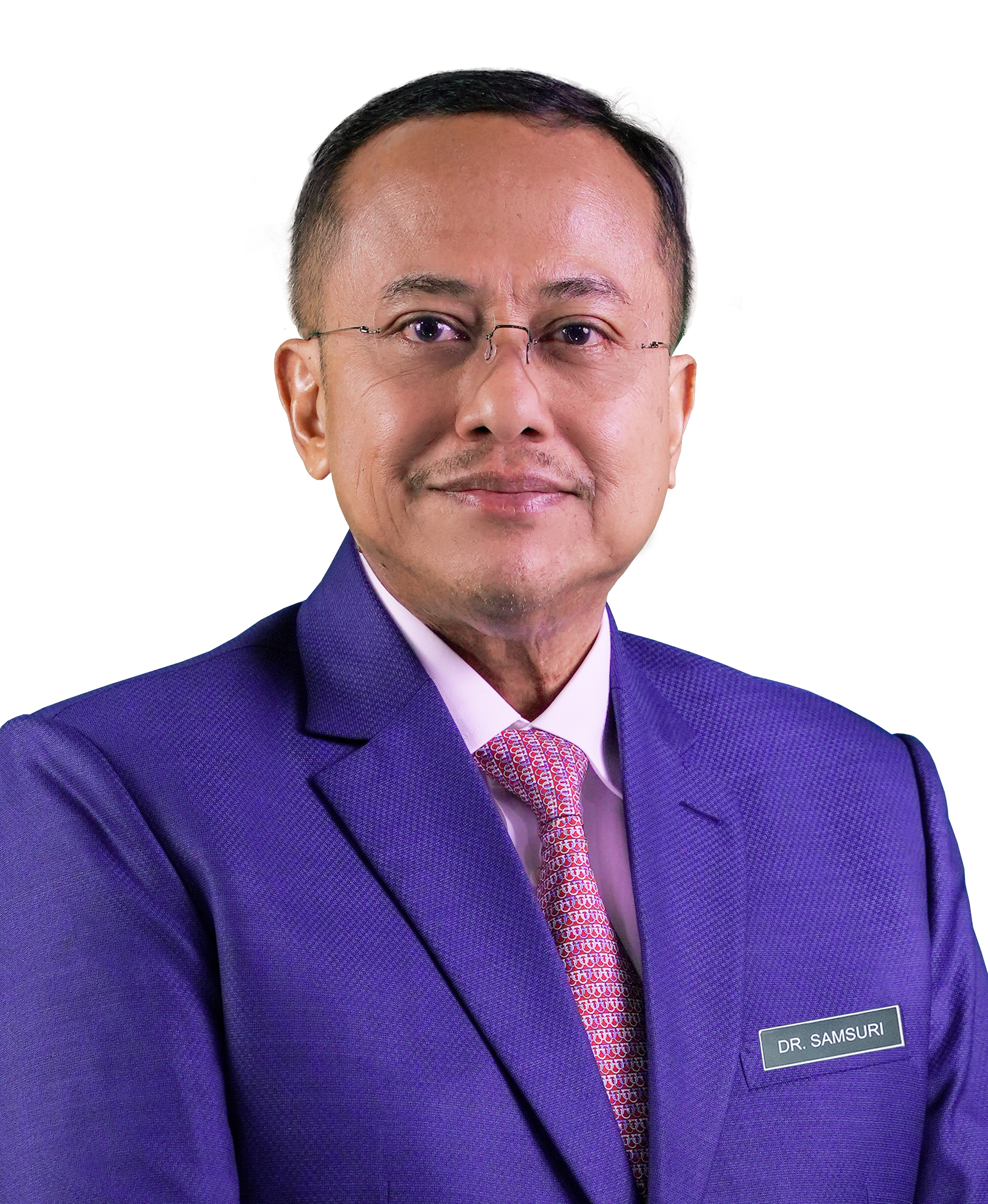
- Ahmad Samsuri in 2023

15th Menteri Besar of Terengganu
- Incumbent
- Assumed office 10 May 2018
- Monarch: Mizan Zainal Abidin
- Preceded by: Ahmad Razif Abdul Rahman
- Constituency: Ru Rendang

18th Leader of the Opposition
- In office 16 May 2026 – 13 June 2026
- Monarch: Ibrahim Iskandar
- Prime Minister: Anwar Ibrahim
- Preceded by: Hamzah Zainudin
- Succeeded by: Hamzah Zainudin
- Constituency: Kemaman
Parliamentary offices
Member of the Malaysian Parliament for Kemaman
Incumbent
Assumed office 2 December 2023
Preceded by	Che Alias Hamid (PN–PAS)
Majority	37,220 (2023)
Member of the Terengganu State Legislative Assembly for Ru Rendang
Incumbent
Assumed office 9 May 2018
Preceded by	Abdul Hadi Awang (PR–PAS)
Majority	6,028 (2018); 17,826 (2023)
Party offices
2nd Chairman of Perikatan Nasional
Incumbent
Assumed office 22 February 2026
Deputy	Muhyiddin Yassin; Dominic Lau Hoe Chai; Punithan Paramsiven; Tuan Ibrahim Tuan Man
Preceded by	Muhyiddin Yassin
1st Treasurer-General of Perikatan Nasional
In office 9 November 2020 – 11 December 2024
Chairman	Muhyiddin Yassin
Preceded by	Position established
Succeeded by	Muhammad Sanusi Md Nor
Vice President of the Malaysian Islamic Party
Incumbent
Assumed office 21 June 2019 Serving with Idris Ahmad & Mohd Amar Abdullah
President	Abdul Hadi Awang
Preceded by	Iskandar Abdul Samad

Faction represented in Dewan Rakyat
- 2023–: Perikatan Nasional

Faction represented in the Terengganu State Legislative Assembly
- 2018–2020: Malaysian Islamic Party
- 2020–: Perikatan Nasional

Personal details
- Born: Ahmad Samsuri bin Mokhtar; 16 November 1970 (age 55) Kampung Pulau Panjang, Jerteh, Besut, Terengganu, Malaysia
- Citizenship: Malaysia
- Party: Malaysian Islamic Party (PAS)
- Other political affiliations: Gagasan Sejahtera (GS) (2016–2020); Perikatan Nasional (PN) (2020–present)
- Education: National University of Malaysia (BEng); University of Leeds (MSc, PhD)
- Occupation: Politician
- Profession: Aerospace engineer; lecturer
- Website: drsamsuri.com
- Ahmad Samsuri Mokhtar on Facebook

Ahmad Samsuri bin Mokhtar (Jawi: أحمد سمسوري بن مختار; born 16 November 1970) is a Malaysian politician, aerospace engineer and lecturer who has served as the 15th Menteri Besar of Terengganu, Member of the Terengganu State Legislative Assembly (MLA) for Ru Rendang since May 2018, Member of Parliament (MP) for Kemaman since December 2023, and Group Chairman for Terengganu Incorporated (TI Group). He held a brief stint as the 18th Leader of the Opposition from May to June 2026 before being succeeded by Hamzah Zainudin during the RESET Malaysia Convention. He is a member of the Malaysian Islamic Party (PAS), a component party of the Perikatan Nasional (PN) coalition. He has served as the 2nd Chairman of PN since February 2026, and the Vice President of PAS since June 2019.

== Early life and education ==
Ahmad Samsuri was born in Jerteh, Besut, Terengganu, Malaysia on 16 November 1970. He went to Sekolah Menengah Sains Sultan Mahmud, Kuala Terengganu from 1983 until 1988. He received Bachelor of Engineering (Hons) in Mechanical and Materials Engineering from Universiti Kebangsaan Malaysia in 1993, Masters of Science in Combustion and Energy from Centre for Combustion Studies, University of Leeds in 1996, and a Doctor of Philosophy (PhD) in Aeroengine Ignition and Combustion, High Altitude Engine Failure from the School of Mechanical Engineering, University of Leeds in 2001.

== Early career ==
Ahmad Samsuri is an aerospace engineer by profession. Prior to his involvement in politics, he previously worked as a Quality Assurance (QA) engineer for Hitachi Consumer Products in 1993-1994, as a research officer in the Faculty of Engineering, USM in 1994-1995, as the head of department (HOD) of the Department of Aerospace Engineering, Faculty of Engineering, UPM in 2003-2008, where he also served as a lecturer (2001–2006) and an associate professor (2003–2008) for UNISEL.

Ahmad Samsuri received his Professional Engineer (PEng) certificate from Board of Engineers Malaysia (BEM) in 2024.

== Political career ==
=== Political secretary to Abdul Hadi Awang (2008–2018) ===
Ahmad Samsuri served as the political secretary to the President of PAS, Abdul Hadi Awang from 2008 until 2018.

=== Menteri Besar of Terengganu (since 2018) ===
Ahead of the swearing-in ceremony for the Menteri Besar and the ten state executive councillors (EXCO) before the Sultan of Terengganu, Mizan Zainal Abidin, PAS Terengganu State Commissioner Husain Awang declined to disclose the nominees. Instead, Ahmad Samsuri remarked that the appointments would be revealed following the two-hour ceremony. PAS had reportedly submitted three names to the Sultan for the Menteri Besar post. Rumours had circulated within the party leadership that Ahmad Samsuri, was among the nominees. A former Universiti Putra Malaysia (UPM) lecturer and aerospace specialist, Ahmad Samsuri's nomination was part of a strategic effort by PAS to transition toward a new generation of leadership by having "technocrats" for political leadership. Following the 2018 Terengganu state election, in which PAS secured a two-thirds majority in the Terengganu State Legislative Assembly to form the government, Ahmad Samsuri succeeded Ahmad Razif Abdul Rahman as Menteri Besar of Terengganu.

Ahmad Samsuri had sworn in as Menteri Besar for the second term on 15 August 2023, after winning all 32 seats in the state assembly.

In December 2022, Ahmad Samsuri was criticized for flying to New Zealand when his state was hit by floods.

=== Member of Parliament for Kemaman (since 2023) ===
Following the disqualification of Che Alias Hamid as the MP for Kemaman on 26 September 2023 and his decision against filing an appeal, the Kemaman by-election was triggered. Ahmad Samsuri instead of Che Alias was nominated by Perikatan Nasional (PN) to contest for the seat. He won the seat and was elected the Member of Parliament for Kemaman by defeating former Chief of Defence Force, Raja Mohamed Affandi of Barisan Nasional (BN) by a majority of 37,220 votes, where there was a increased majority but lower turnout compared to the 2022 general election. He described his landslide victory as having paved the way for PN to the Putrajaya, which is the administrative capital of the nation.

=== 18th Leader of the Opposition (2026) ===
On 16 May, following the expulsion of the opposition leader Hamzah Zainudin from BERSATU—a component party of the Perikatan Nasional coalition, Ahmad Samsuri was announced as his replacement by the coaliation's supreme council.

He made national history as the shortest-serving Leader of the Opposition. Appointed on 16 May 2026, his tenure was terminated on 13 June 2026, lasting 28 days. His removal from office was announced during a live broadcast by PAS President, Hadi Awang. Throughout this brief period, he did not attend a single parliamentary session, and consequently, never formally occupied the opposition leader's seat in the Dewan Rakyat.

== Election results ==
Parliament of Malaysia
Year	Constituency	Candidate	Votes	Pct	Opponent(s)	Votes	Pct	Ballots cast	Majority	Turnout
2023	P040 Kemaman	Ahmad Samsuri Mokhtar (PAS)	64,998	70.06%	Raja Mohamed Affandi Raja Mohamed Noor (BN)	27,798	29.94%	92,776	37,220	65.76%

Terengganu State Legislative Assembly
Year	Constituency	Candidate	Votes	Pct	Opponent(s)	Votes	Pct	Ballots cast	Majority	Turnout
2018	N19 Ru Rendang	Ahmad Samsuri Mokhtar (PAS)	13,851	61.83%	Nik Dir Nik Wan Ku (UMNO)	7,823	34.92%	22,728	6,028	87.40%
2018	N19 Ru Rendang	Ahmad Samsuri Mokhtar (PAS)	13,851	61.83%	Zarawi Sulong (AMANAH)	729	3.25%	22,728	6,028	87.40%
2023	N19 Ru Rendang	Ahmad Samsuri Mokhtar (PAS)	20,927	85.18%	Suhaimi Sulaiman (AMANAH)	3,641	14.82%	24,773	17,286	75.37%

== Honours and awards ==
=== Honours of Malaysia ===
- Malaysia
  - Recipient of the 17th Yang di-Pertuan Agong Installation Medal (2024)
- Terengganu
  - Knight Grand Companion of the Order of Sultan Mizan Zainal Abidin of Terengganu (SSMZ) – Dato' Seri (2019)
  - Recipient of Sultan Mizan Zainal Abidin Silver Jubilee Medal (2023)
- Kedah
  - Recipient of the Sultan Sallehuddin Installation Medal (2018)

=== Academic awards and professional certificate ===
- Anugerah Penyelidik Cemerlang, Universiti Putra Malaysia, 2005
- Anugerah Pencapaian Khas, Federal Agency for Industry (ROSPROM), Russian Federation: 54th World Exhibition of Innovation. *Research & NewTechnologies, Brussels, 2005
- Pingat Emas, 54th World Exhibition of Innovation. Research & New Technologies, Brussels, 2005
- Anugerah Khidmat Cemerlang, Universiti Putra Malaysia, 2003
- Anugerah Khidmat Cemerlang, Universiti Putra Malaysia, 2004
- Professional Engineer, Board of Engineers Malaysia, 2024

Political offices
Preceded by Ahmad Razif Abdul Rahman	Menteri Besar of Terengganu; 2018–present	Incumbent
