= Jingga 13 =

Jingga 13 جيڠݢ 13
- Formation: 2011
- Founder: Fariz Musa
- Type: Non-profit; NGO
- Headquarters: Kuala Lumpur, Malaysia.
- Location: Malaysia
- Field: To support the Reformasi movement in Malaysia, politics reforms, social activism
- Members: Voluntary
- Chief Coordinator: Fariz Musa
- Website: jingga13malaysia.blogspot.com

Jingga 13 is a Malaysian first national Non profit organisation closely related to People's Justice Party (PKR) dedicated in supporting the Reformasi movement in Malaysia since 2011 and was labeled as pro-Pakatan Rakyat (PR) and its successor Pakatan Harapan (PH).

Jingga 13 is also a PKR's supported anti-corruption movement NGO.
