= Che Alias Hamid =

Malaysian politician

Yang Berhormat Senator Ustaz Che Alias Hamid JSM SMT
- چئ الياس حميد

Chairman of the Kemaman Port Authority
- In office 18 April 2020 – 17 April 2022
- Minister: Wee Ka Siong
- Deputy: Jana Santhiran Muniayan
- Director-General: Kahirul Anuar Abdul Rahman
- Preceded by: Toh Chin Yaw
- Succeeded by: Ramli Shahul

Senator Elected by the Terengganu State Legislative Assembly
- Incumbent
- Assumed office 21 November 2024 Serving with Hussin Ismail
- Monarch: Ibrahim
- Prime Minister: Anwar Ibrahim
- Preceded by: Husain Awang

Member of the Malaysian Parliament for Kemaman
- In office 9 May 2018 – 26 September 2023
- Preceded by: Ahmad Shabery Cheek (BN–UMNO)
- Succeeded by: Ahmad Samsuri Mokhtar (PN–PAS)
- Majority: 2,163 (2018); 27,179 (2022)

Faction represented in Dewan Negara
- 2024–: Perikatan Nasional

Faction represented in Dewan Rakyat
- 2013–2020: Malaysian Islamic Party
- 2020–2023: Perikatan Nasional

Personal details
- Born: Che Alias bin Hamid; 2 June 1966 (age 60) Kampong Semanyor, Kemasik, Kemaman, Terengganu, Malaysia
- Citizenship: Malaysia
- Party: Malaysian Islamic Party (PAS)
- Other political affiliations: Pakatan Rakyat (PR) (2008–2015); Gagasan Sejahtera (GS) (2016–2020); Perikatan Nasional (PN) (since 2020)
- Education: University of Malaya
- Occupation: Politician

Yang Berhormat Senator Ustaz Che Alias bin Hamid (Jawi: چئ الياس بن حميد; born 2 June 1966) is a Malaysian politician who has served as a Senator since November 2024. He was the Chairman of the Kemaman Port Authority (LPKmn) from April 2020 to April 2022 and the Member of Parliament (MP) for Kemaman from May 2018 to his disqualification in September 2023. He is a member and the Yang di-Pertua (Division Chief) of Kemaman of the Malaysian Islamic Party (PAS), a component party of the Perikatan Nasional (PN) coalition.

== Election results ==
Terengganu State Legislative Assembly
Year	Constituency	Candidate	Votes	Pct	Opponent(s)	Votes	Pct	Ballots cast	Majority	Turnout
1999	N29 Kemasik	Che Alias Hamid (PAS)	3,979	49.35%	Mohamad Bakar Ali (UMNO)	4,083	50.65%	8,197	104	82.13%
2013	N29 Kemasik	Che Alias Hamid (PAS)	7,332	44.54%	Rosli Othman (UMNO)	8,230	50.00%	16,398	898	87.0%
2013	N29 Kemasik	Che Alias Hamid (PAS)	7,332	44.54%	Zulkiflee Salleh (IND)	898	5.46%	16,398	898	87.0%

Parliament of Malaysia
Year	Constituency	Candidate	Votes	Pct	Opponent(s)	Votes	Pct	Ballots cast	Majority	Turnout
2018	P040 Kemaman	Che Alias Hamid (PAS)	39,878	44.06%	Ahmad Shabery Cheek (UMNO)	37,715	41.67%	90,504	2,163	84.12%
2018	P040 Kemaman	Che Alias Hamid (PAS)	39,878	44.06%	Mohd Huzaifah Md Suhaimi (PKR)	12,911	14.27%	90,504	2,163	84.12%
2022	P040 Kemaman	Che Alias Hamid (PAS)	65,714	58.11%	Ahmad Said (UMNO)	38,535	34.07%	113,095	27,179	81.12%
2022	P040 Kemaman	Che Alias Hamid (PAS)	65,714	58.11%	Hasuni Sudin (PKR)	8,340	7.37%	113,095	27,179	81.12%
2022	P040 Kemaman	Che Alias Hamid (PAS)	65,714	58.11%	Rosli Abd Ghani (PEJUANG)	506	0.45%	113,095	27,179	81.12%

== Honours ==
- Malaysia
  - Companion of the Order of Loyalty to the Crown of Malaysia (JSM) (2021)
  - Recipient of the 17th Yang di-Pertuan Agong Installation Medal (2024)
- Terengganu
  - Companion of the Order of the Crown of Terengganu (SMT) (2022)

== See also ==
- Members of the Dewan Negara, 15th Malaysian Parliament
- List of people who have served in both Houses of the Malaysian Parliament
