= 2008 Malaysian general election =

- 8 March 2008

All 222 seats in the Dewan Rakyat 112 seats needed for a majority
- Registered: 10,922,140 (▲6.20%)
- Turnout: 75.99% (▲2.08pp)
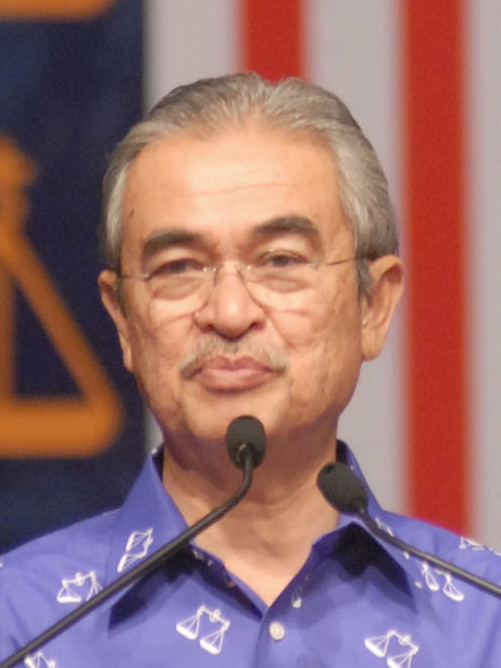

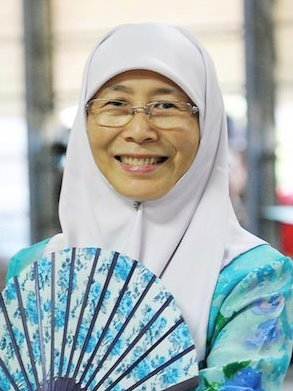
	First party	Second party
Leader	Abdullah Ahmad Badawi	Wan Azizah Wan Ismail
Party	UMNO	PKR
Alliance	Barisan Nasional	Pakatan Rakyat
Last election	63.81%, 198 seats	34.10%, 20 seats
Seats won	140	82
Seat change	▼58	▲62
Popular vote	4,082,371	3,768,222
Percentage	51.38%	47.43%
Swing	▼12.43pp	▲13.33pp
- Results by constituency
Prime Minister before election
Abdullah Ahmad Badawi
BN
Elected Prime Minister
Abdullah Ahmad Badawi
BN

General elections were held in Malaysia on Saturday, 8 March 2008. Voting took place in all 222 parliamentary constituencies of Malaysia, each electing one Member of Parliament to the Dewan Rakyat, the dominant house of Parliament. State elections also took place in 505 state constituencies in 12 of the 13 states (excluding Sarawak) on the same day.

The 11th Parliament was dissolved on 13 February 2008, and the following day the Election Commission announced nominations would be held on 24 February, with general voting set for 8 March. State assemblies of all states except Sarawak (due to election having been held there in 2006) were also dissolved and their elections took place at the same time.

Political parties were reported to have begun preparations for the polls as early as January 2008. As in 2004, the incumbent Barisan Nasional coalition, the ruling political alliance since independence, as well as opposition parties represented primarily by Democratic Action Party (DAP), the Pan-Malaysian Islamic Party (PAS), and People's Justice Party (PKR) contested the election.

As with all preceding general elections following independence, the parliamentary election was won by BN, but this election also yielded the worst results in the coalition's history until the election ten years later. Opposition parties won 82 seats in the 222-seat Dewan Rakyat and 48% of the vote, while BN only managed to secure the remaining 140 seats and 51% of the vote.

It marked the first time since the 1969 election that the coalition did not win a two-thirds supermajority in the Malaysian Parliament required to pass amendments to the Malaysian Constitution. In addition, five of the twelve contested state legislatures were won by the opposition, compared with only one in the last election but Perak was retaken by Barisan Nasional after 11-month administration by Pakatan Rakyat coalition. This marked the end of Abdullah Ahmad Badawi's tenure as prime minister before his handover to Najib Razak several months later.

As of the 2022 general election, this is the last time the Barisan Nasional won the overall popular vote.

== Background ==
The Malaysian Parliament was dissolved on 13 February 2008 by the Yang di-Pertuan Agong (King) on the advice of Prime Minister Abdullah Ahmad Badawi, from which a general election will be required to be held within the 60 days, between 13 February 2008 and 13 April 2008. The announcement of the dissolution was done a day after the Prime Minister publicly denied that Parliament would be dissolved on 13 February.

Speculation on the exact polling date was rife, as political analysts expected polling to be held after the Chinese New Year on 7 February and during the week-long school holidays from 7 to 16 March, as schools will be available for use as polling stations. Political analysts saw a March election as an attempt by the Prime Minister to garner a fresh mandate before a slowdown in the global and Malaysian economies, and in an effort to bar Anwar Ibrahim from contesting, as he is permitted to re-enter politics on 14 April 2008.

On 14 February, the Election Commission announced nominations would be held on 24 February, with general election set for 8 March. This will allow for 13 days of campaigning to take place. Anwar Ibrahim subsequently criticised the Prime Minister on the choice of date, calling the move a "dirty trick" and a sign of "Prime Minister Abdullah [...] getting personal." There were expectations that a Member of Parliament from Anwar's party, Parti Keadilan Rakyat, would resign after that date to pave the way for a by-election which Anwar could contest to attempt a comeback in Parliament. At the time these claims were unsubstantiated, however, the expectations were fulfilled when Anwar's wife vacated her seat.

== Campaign ==
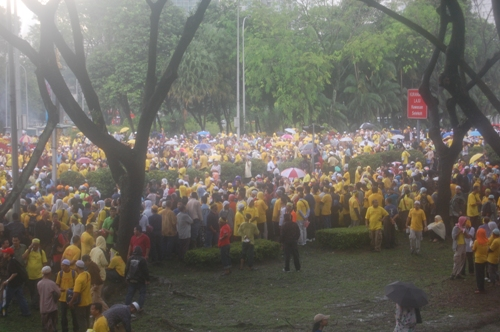
The 2007 Bersih rally was largest public protest since 1998. HINDRAF organised another large-scale rally a few weeks later.

The Merdeka Centre ran a survey in 2008 to gauge public sentiment and the result was published soon after. There was a series of issues raised by all sides in the run-up to the election. Among the issues are inflation, shortage of goods, fuel subsidies, rising crime, majority government, mismanagement, corruption, the demand for free and fair elections by a group of NGOs and political parties under the Coalition for Clean and Fair Elections (BERSIH), racial equality especially as highlighted by HINDRAF, Internal Security Act detainees, the case surrounding the Royal Commission of Inquiry into the Lingam Video Clip and the eligibility of former Deputy Prime Minister, Datuk Seri Anwar Ibrahim.

Anger among ethnic Indians regarding issues such as restrictions on jobs, education, freedom of religion and rights, and a widespread feeling of loss of dignity have played a part during the 2008 parliamentary elections in Malaysia. One of the other main issues brought up has been whether the election would be conducted fairly. The opposition has pointed out these issues are gerrymandering of electoral districts, uneven media access, outdated electoral systems, election fraud and vote buying.

Besides, it was also alleged that the anti-Khairy Jamaluddin sentiment became another main factor in the National Front's heavy losses, as stated by Mahathir Mohamad. Khairy Jamaluddin is the son-in-law of the current Prime Minister Abdullah Ahmad Badawi and was accused of influencing the Prime Minister when making critical decisions.

=== Government ===
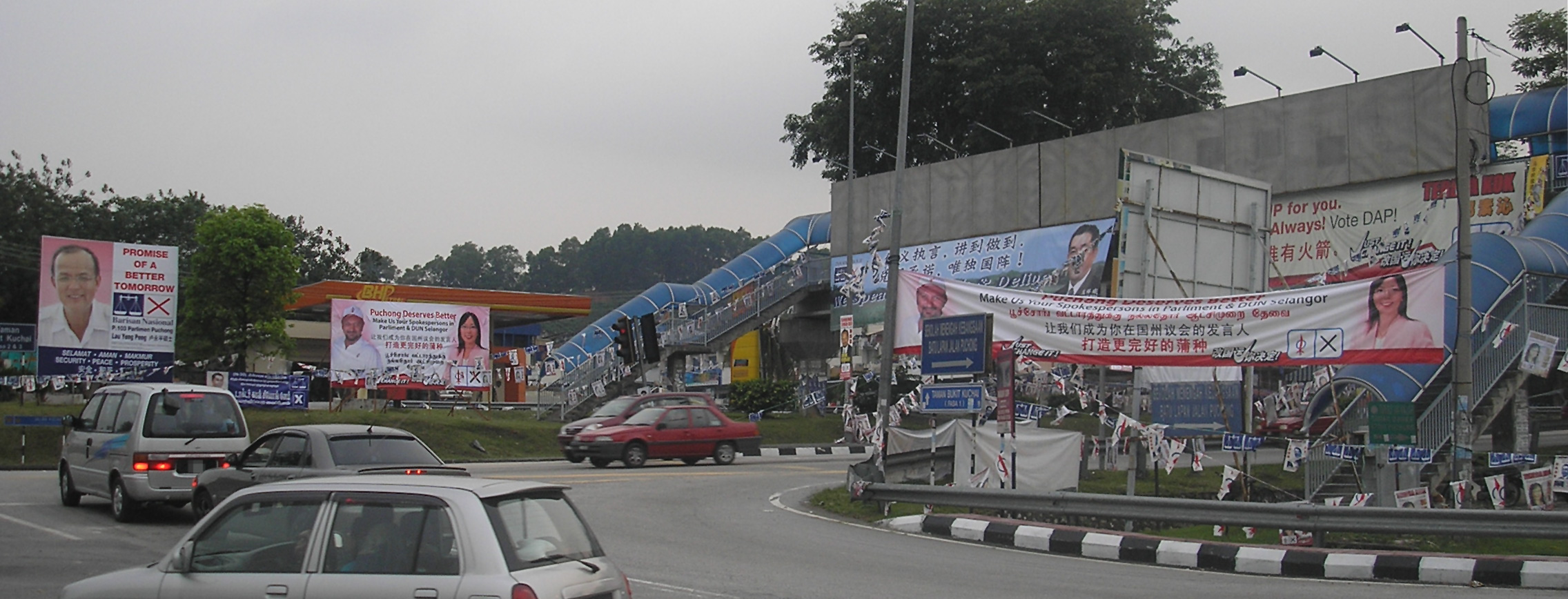
Campaign banners at Taman Kinrara, Selangor. The state assembly seat of Kinrara is contested by both National Front (represented by incumbent Kaw Cheong Wei) and the Democratic Action Party (represented by Teresa Kok Suh Sim). Also depicted are incumbent Lau Yeng Peng (BN-Gerakan) and Gobind Singh Deo (DAP), contesting for the parliamentary seat of Puchong.

Prime Minister Abdullah Badawi's ruling United Malays National Organisation (UMNO) party and their National Front partners ran a younger crop of candidates with fewer ties to former Prime Minister Mahathir Mohamad, the architect of the country's affirmative-action policies in the election. Abdullah said he needed "one or two more terms" to successfully complete various economic projects he has started.

The government wished to retake the mandate of the opposition state of Kelantan from PAS, promising the Kelantanese people major development projects and jobs. Awang Adek Hussin, a deputy minister heading UMNO's campaign in Kelantan said that if voted in they would repair or build 500 mosques, including a Grand Mosque, to woo Muslim voters.

In Sabah, chief minister and Sabah BN chairman Musa Aman announced that the same formula used in the 2004 election would be used in this election with regard to the allocation of seats among BN's component parties of Sabah. Sabah BN has used the same allocation formula for both the parliamentary election as well as for the state election. In this election, UMNO would contest in 13 parliamentary seats, Parti Bersatu Sabah (PBS) would contest in four, United Pasokmomogun Kadazandusun Murut Organisation (UPKO) in four, Sabah Progressive Party (SAPP) in two, Parti Bersatu Rakyat Sabah (PBRS) in one, and the Liberal Democratic Party (LDP) in one.

BN coalition rolled out a major publicity campaign with a slogan promising "security, peace, prosperity" in advertisements that featured prominently in newspapers and on television.

=== Opposition ===
The main Malaysian opposition parties, which are the Parti Keadilan Rakyat (PKR), Democratic Action Party (DAP) and the Pan-Malaysian Islamic Party (PAS), planned to deny the ruling coalition a two-thirds majority in Parliament in a bid to loosen the government's five-decade grip on power as reflected by their manifestos. The three parties highlighted Malaysia's rising crime rate, consumer-price inflation and government corruption throughout the election campaign. Civil Society groups unofficially merged five opposition parties under a banner called the Barisan Rakyat (People's Front) in which they agreed on certain policy matters, particularly two civil society documents: The People's Declaration, and The People's Voice; and agreed not to contest against each other in any seats. The five parties include DAP, PKR and PAS, as well as Parti Sosialis Malaysia (PSM) and the United Pasok Nunukragang National Organisation (PASOK).

Part of the opposition campaign took place in cyberspace and new media, utilising new technologies such as blogs, SMS and YouTube. Major newspapers and television stations, which were partly owned by parties in the government coalition, only mention the opposition in passing. On 2 March, PAS President Abdul Hadi Awang challenged Abdullah Badawi to hold a televised debate similar to those held by US presidential candidates. However, government leaders stated there was no place for such debates in Malaysia, claiming the focus should be on debating with locals concerning local issues affecting them.

The Opposition had also increased focus on Abdullah Badawi's performance in the last few years and being a poor leader who sleeps on the job. They mentioned that as a result of his weak leadership, matters such as crime, corruption and racial and religious tensions have increased. On 4 March, campaigning in Malaysia's general election took on a personal tone as rivals slung accusations of nepotism, hypocrisy, boorish language and sexist tactics. It was also suggested Abdullah is grooming his son-in-law, Khairy Jamaluddin, as Malaysia's future leader.

In terms of raising funds, the Opposition appealed to the public through websites and blogs for supporters to contribute funds through credit cards and bank transfers to help them print campaign posters and hold public forums. The Opposition had repeatedly pointed out that they are unable to match the ruling coalition's massive spending power.

=== Uncontested wins ===
On the nomination day, 24 February 2008, BN secured seven parliamentary seats and two state assembly seats uncontested. PAS also won a state seat after the BN nominee was found to have been declared bankrupt, although this was later disproved.

On 26 February 2008, independent contender Junak Jawek dropped out of the polls for the new Parliamentary seat of Igan. Wahab Dolah of BN was declared the winner. This brings the total number of uncontested wins by National Front to ten seats as of 27 February 2008: eight parliamentary and two state seats.

Some PKR candidates have alleged fraud, claiming they received offers from BN not to contest. Rahamat Idil Latip, the PKR candidate for the Parliamentary seat of Santubong, claimed he was told he would receive RM300,000 if he withdrew his nomination. After jokingly asking for RM3 million, he was told that it would be considered.

==== Pensiangan ====
One of the parliamentary seats won unopposed by BN was in P.182 Pensiangan (Sabah), which was won by Joseph Kurup of Parti Bersatu Rakyat Sabah (PBRS). The two candidates who were supposed to contest in this seat were Danny Anthony Andipai (PKR) and Saineh Usau (independent). Both were disqualified after submitting their nomination forms after 10:00 am.

It was alleged by both rejected candidates that they were blocked from going to the nomination centre, resulting in both candidates submitting their candidacies late, at 10:25 am and 10:30 am, respectively. During the one-hour objection period from 11:00 am, Kurup raised objections to the late submissions and they were accepted by the returning officer; he then disqualified the two candidates from contesting. Police reports were later lodged on the matter in Keningau. Joseph Kurup, on the other hand, claimed he was punched after being declared winner of the seat; he also lodged a police report on this matter.

On 8 September 2008, Kota Kinabalu High Court judge Justice David Wong Dak Wah declared that the Pensiangan parliamentary seat which was won uncontested by Kurup invalid and Kurup's seat be left vacant, paving the way for a possible by-election for this constituency. Recent amendments to the election laws, however, allow Kurup to appeal the decision at the Federal Court. The petition was filed by Andipai, and had named Kurup, returning officer Bubudan OT Majalu, and the Election Commission as respondents.

On 13 March 2009, The Federal Court in Kota Kinabalu overturned an Election Court decision on 8 Sep to strip Pensiangan MP Joseph Kurup of the seat and declare it vacant. Federal Court Judge Nik Hashim Nik Abdul Rahman who delivered the verdict held that Kurup was duly elected to the parliamentary constituency of P182 Pensiangan.

Nik Hashim held that there had not been any failure on the part of the Returning Officer (RO) to comply with the election laws.

== Conduct ==
Previous elections in the country had fuelled complaints that an allegedly subservient Election Commission, gerrymandering, vote fraud, compliant media, misuse of government resources and massive vote buying gave the National Front or Barisan Nasional an unfair advantage. It had been highlighted to the Election Commission of Malaysia that its electoral roll has been suspect, because of the discovery that it contains nearly 9,000 people aged more than 100. This raised suspicions that the books are contaminated with dead voters which leaves the election vulnerable to fraud.

Further discoveries of people who have been born in the same year possessing different identity cards (IC) and living in many different localities, were uncovered by Malaysians for Free and Fair Elections (Mafrel). These people are registered to vote in various places throughout the country. These issues led to questions regarding the fairness of the elections.

It was also highlighted by the Opposition that certain postal voters were issued with two ballot sheets. This was discovered during checks with the Election Commission when they were preparing postal voting kits. Activists from BERSIH say each ballot was also attached to a letter identifying the voter along with the voting slip serial number, so it would be easy to trace who voted for the opposition. Electoral reform activists said that a number of seats that the opposition could win could be decided by postal votes and that those casting postal votes do not have the freedom to choose the candidate they want.

Human Rights Watch, which had been monitoring the election process, stated that government restraints on expression, assembly and access to state media would deny Malaysians a fair vote. Calling the electoral process "grossly unfair", Human Rights Watch called on the government to address concerns with fraud in the electoral rolls, and to provide opposition parties access to state media. De facto Law Minister Nazri Aziz accused Human Rights Watch of bias, saying they were attempting to discredit the electoral process because "they know the National Front will win".

On 17 March, a week after the release of election results and one-third win by opposition parties, BERSIH claimed the Opposition would have obtained a parliamentary majority if not for fraud. Sivarasa Rasiah, BERSIH spokesperson and newly elected PKR MP for Subang, stated:

[The opposition] would have had an outright win if this were a free and fair election...To win another 30 seats (to form a majority in parliament) all [they] needed was just another 56,000 votes...Just because the opposition won big does not mean the election was free and fair. [They] are calling for a royal commission to investigate the electoral process.

Citing 72,058 unreturned ballot papers – of which 41,564 were for parliamentary seats and 30,494 for state assembly seats – BERSIH alleged that many of these ballots had in reality been cast for the opposition or spoilt but were discarded, further pointing to the fact that most of them were postal ballots. BERSIH spokespeople did not rule out further street demonstrations.

=== Use of indelible ink for voters ===
On 2 June 2007, the Election Commission made public the proposed use of indelible ink to mark participating voters at polling stations, and its use officially confirmed by the commission's chairman Abdul Rashid Abdul Rahman on 13 August 2007. Its introduction was a measure precluding electoral fraud by preventing duplicate votes, and would mark the first time indelible ink was to be used in a Malaysian general election.

Early reaction to the proposal was mixed. Both DAP secretary-general Lim Guan Eng and PAS president Abdul Hadi Awang welcomed the move, with Abdul Hadi's party voicing interest in the type of ink used. PKR vice-president Tian Chua initially remained sceptical unless the EC "implemented the system". Members of BN were more critical, with UMNO secretary-general Mohd Radzi Sheikh Ahmad, MCA secretary-general Ong Ka Chuan and Gerakan vice-president Teng Hock Nan proposing the use of other systems, such as a fingerprint-based biometrics system, as alternatives. An additional comment by BN against the use of the indelible ink was the lack of assurance the ink used will contain safe or halal ingredients, taking into account Muslim voters. On 9 August, the National Fatwa Council declared the ink safe for use, after receiving a lab report from the Chemistry Department of Universiti Kebangsaan Malaysia.

On 4 March 2008, four days before polling, the commission announced it was cancelling the plan, citing concerns about the constitutionality of the measure – without a constitutional amendment permitting the practice, it could be illegal for a polling clerk to stop a voter from voting even if his or her finger was already marked with indelible ink. The Commission chair also claimed intelligence concerning possible conspiracies to undermine the electoral process by applying ink to the fingers of those who had not yet voted, and said it would be best to refrain from adopting the measure for the sake of public order and security. According to the Election Commission, the decision to cancel the use of indelible ink was based on reports that certain parties tried to "sabotage" the election process in Kedah, Kelantan and Perlis. The police has arrested several persons that tried to smuggle the ink through neighbouring Thailand.

Opposition parties widely condemned the move. PKR Deputy President Syed Husin Ali alleged that the commission was "colluding with BN to allow cheating in the coming general elections," and claimed that this was proof the government felt the Opposition would perform well on polling day. Dzulkifli Ahmad, a PAS and BERSIH leader, said that both organisations opposed the move, and that "We want to make it clear that we are entering this election under protest". Dzulkifli added that BERSIH would file a complaint after polling day. Lim Guan Eng declared that the decision would only benefit the ruling coalition, and demanded an explanation for the claim of adverse effects on public security: "It is ridiculous that the use of indelible ink can put the whole country into chaos and ruination." Lim condemned the waste incurred over RM2 million having been spent purchasing 47,000 bottles of indelible ink from India, as of 23 February, and said that the DAP would be investigating legal avenues to reverse the decision.

Response from the ruling coalition was mixed. Deputy Prime Minister Najib Tun Razak, an UMNO leader, found the reversal "appropriate", citing concerns that people would be misled into applying similar-looking ink to their fingers, denying them the right to vote. In a statement, MCA described the measure as "disappointing", saying the late announcement meant opposition parties would unnecessarily politicise the situation.

In response, several leaders of the Malaysians for Free and Fair Elections (Mafrel), including Mafrel chair Abdul Malek Hussin and deputy chair Syed Ibrahim Syed Noh, have refused to accept EC accrediting as official observers, saying they refused to legitimise the decision. Officially, they said, any EC-accredited Mafrel member could observe the polling process, and they would themselves carry out all other duties as observers, except those requiring EC accreditation such as observing the polling process from within polling stations. Abdul Malek added that Mafrel strongly protested the decision as contrary to its own recommendations, and compared the measure to withdrawing all currency from circulation because of the presence of counterfeit notes. He further questioned the legal reasoning behind the decision, arguing that as Parliament had speedily passed a constitutional amendment to extend the tenure of the EC chairperson, any necessary constitutional amendments could have been introduced and passed well in advance.

After the election, Anwar Ibrahim claimed that the failure to use indelible ink had cost the PKR-DAP-PAS coalition 15 seats in Parliament, adding that "It is not unrealistic to imagine that we could actually have won a majority right then." Two weeks after the polls, several NGOs including the Malaysian Voters Union asked the Attorney-General to officially charge four men who they alleged had been arrested for involvement in the supposed conspiracy. As of 24 March 2008, the men had not been remanded by a court, nor charged with a crime; their arrest was not publicised.

In May, Home Minister Syed Hamid Albar told Parliament in his written response to a question from Fong Po Kuan that "there was no evidence at all to show the ink was smuggled in from Thailand... From the witness statements, no individual, syndicate or any particular party was identified to be involved in this (ink smuggling). The complainant and witness' statement were based on hearsay and no individual was identified positively."

Unused, the ink remained in storage until 25 November 2009, when it was burnt in accordance to government procedures. Prior to disposal, the ink was to be sold, but had passed its expiry date.

=== Rusila (Terengganu) riot ===
Polling day was uneventful except a serious incident in Rusila, in Marang constituency in the east coast state of Terengganu, where 300 supporters of the Pan-Malaysian Islamic Party (PAS) stopped several buses and cars they suspected carrying fraudulent voters ferried in by the coalition and confiscating Malaysian identity cards of the voters. When the police arrived to bring order, the PAS supporters were reported to have beaten up the police and destroyed police vehicles, including several Federal Reserve Unit (Malaysian riot police) vehicles. A helicopter from the Royal Malaysian Army had to be called in. To break up the rioters, police fired tear gas, and the son of PAS president Abdul Hadi Awang was among those arrested.

== Results ==
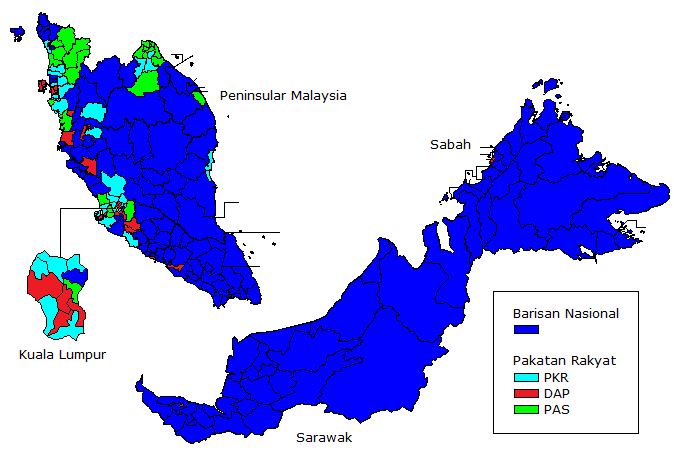
Results by constituency

As polls opened in Malaysia on 8 March from 8:00 to 17:00, voters cast ballots for 222 parliamentary seats and 12 state legislatures, with voter turnout among Malaysia's 10.9 million eligible voters estimated to be 70 percent. Barisan Nasional won 91 percent of parliamentary seats in 2004 election, but its majority is expected to be clipped this time as it suffers a backlash from ethnic Chinese and Indians. Early vote counting showed the Barisan Nasional was already faring badly in early tallies across the country with the exception of Sabah, Sarawak and Johor, as claimed by Kelantan United Malays National Organisation (UMNO) state chief Annuar Musa. The opposition began claiming using their own estimates that they have denied the government its two-thirds majority in parliament. Political scientists called these elections "stunning elections".

Barisan Nasional was able to return to power and form the next government, with a simple majority but without the crucial two-thirds majority in parliament. It is BN's worst performance in Malaysia's general election (until 2018) since independence in 1957, winning only 63.5% (140 out of 222) of parliamentary seats that were contested; the only other time the 14-party coalition failed to win a two-thirds majority was in 1969 when it secured 66% of the seats. Component parties in BN, including the Malaysian Chinese Association (MCA), Malaysian Indian Congress (MIC), and Gerakan, saw its number of state and federal seats severely reduced by half or more. UMNO also saw its number reduce significantly but not by as much as half. Also noted were MIC president S. Samy Vellu, Gerakan acting president Koh Tsu Koon and PPP president M. Kayveas, who were trounced in their respective election contests.

The results of several states have been rather surprising to everybody involved. Many of the states BN have lost are those on the western coast of Peninsular Malaysia where it has traditionally focused most of its attention to. These states experienced more development and investment than other states, and account for much of the country's population. The remaining states that have given BN its simple majority are states that are economically weaker than what the opposition have gained.

Party or alliance		Votes	%	Seats	+/–
Barisan Nasional	United Malays National Organisation	2,382,633	29.99	79	–30
Barisan Nasional	Malaysian Chinese Association	840,130	10.57	15	–16
Barisan Nasional	Parti Gerakan Rakyat Malaysia	184,548	2.32	2	–8
Barisan Nasional	Malaysian Indian Congress	179,193	2.26	3	–6
Barisan Nasional	Parti Pesaka Bumiputera Bersatu	131,243	1.65	14	+3
Barisan Nasional	Sarawak United Peoples' Party	119,264	1.50	6	0
Barisan Nasional	Sarawak Progressive Democratic Party	52,645	0.66	4	0
Barisan Nasional	UPKO	58,856	0.74	4	0
Barisan Nasional	United Sabah Party	44,525	0.56	3	–1
Barisan Nasional	Sabah Progressive Party	30,827	0.39	2	–2
Barisan Nasional	Parti Rakyat Sarawak	33,410	0.42	6	New
Barisan Nasional	People's Progressive Party	16,800	0.21	0	–1
Barisan Nasional	Liberal Democratic Party	8,297	0.10	1	+1
Barisan Nasional	Parti Bersatu Rakyat Sabah			1	0
Barisan Nasional	Total	4,082,371	51.38	140	–58
Pakatan Rakyat	People's Justice Party	1,492,950	18.79	30	+29
Pakatan Rakyat	Pan-Malaysian Islamic Party	1,140,373	14.35	23	+15
Pakatan Rakyat	Democratic Action Party	1,118,025	14.07	28	+17
Pakatan Rakyat	Socialist Party of Malaysia	16,874	0.21	1	+1
Pakatan Rakyat	Total	3,768,222	47.43	82	+62
Parti Rakyat Malaysia		19,126	0.24	0	0
Sarawak National Party		8,615	0.11	0	0
Federated Sabah People's Front		942	0.01	0	New
Independents		65,405	0.82	0	–1
Total		7,944,681	100.00	222	+3
Valid votes		7,944,681	97.82		
Invalid/blank votes		176,995	2.18		
Total votes		8,121,676	100.00		
Registered voters/turnout		10,740,228	75.62		
Source: ElectionData.MY

Registered voters in above table reflects the total number of voters for contested constituencies. Total electorate including eight uncontested constituencies is 10,922,140.

=== By state ===
==== Johor ====
Party or alliance		Votes	%	Seats	+/–
Barisan Nasional	United Malays National Organisation	379,578	40.36	16	0
Barisan Nasional	Malaysian Chinese Association	202,111	21.49	7	–1
Barisan Nasional	Parti Gerakan Rakyat Malaysia	16,450	1.75	1	0
Barisan Nasional	Malaysian Indian Congress	15,921	1.69	1	0
Barisan Nasional	Total	614,060	65.30	25	–1
Pakatan Rakyat	People's Justice Party	124,973	13.29	0	0
Pakatan Rakyat	Pan-Malaysian Islamic Party	84,626	9.00	0	0
Pakatan Rakyat	Democratic Action Party	98,938	10.52	1	+1
Pakatan Rakyat	Total	308,747	32.83	1	+1
Parti Rakyat Malaysia		17,794	1.89	0	New
Total		940,391	100.00	26	0
Valid votes		940,391	96.73		
Invalid/blank votes		31,795	3.27		
Total votes		972,186	100.00		
Registered voters/turnout		1,279,119	76.00		
Source: ElectionData.MY

Registered voters in above table reflects the total number of voters for contested constituencies. Total electorate including the uncontested constituency of Pengerang is 1,312,121.

==== Kedah ====
The state of Kedah, which along with Penang, has traditionally produced a substantial bulk of past and present BN leaders (including Tunku Abdul Rahman, and Mahathir Mohamad), also overwhelmingly rose to the call of the opposition. BN only won 4 of the 15 parliamentary seats but did better by winning 14 out of 36 state seats, while the Opposition took the remaining 22 of the 36 state seats, with the Pan-Malaysian Islamic Party (PAS) winning 16, Parti Keadilan Rakyat (PKR) four and the DAP and an independent, one each.

Party or alliance		Votes	%	Seats	+/–
Pakatan Rakyat	Pan-Malaysian Islamic Party	185,787	27.34	6	+5
Pakatan Rakyat	People's Justice Party	175,430	25.82	5	+5
Pakatan Rakyat	Total	361,217	53.16	11	+10
Barisan Nasional	United Malays National Organisation	280,475	41.28	3	–9
Barisan Nasional	Malaysian Chinese Association	37,777	5.56	1	–1
Barisan Nasional	Total	318,252	46.84	4	–10
Total		679,469	100.00	15	0
Valid votes		679,469	97.45		
Invalid/blank votes		17,756	2.55		
Total votes		697,225	100.00		
Registered voters/turnout		873,674	79.80		
Source: ElectionData.MY

==== Kelantan ====
PAS retained control of the state of Kelantan, despite a vigorous campaign by the ruling Barisan Nasional, winning 38 of the 45 state assembly seats along with PKR (which has won one seat). It was a personal setback for Prime Minister Abdullah Ahmad Badawi who had promised millions of dollars in development aid, intending to boost the chances of the Barisan Nasional coalition. The win marked the fifth consecutive time PAS retained power in Kelantan since 1990 and surpasses PAS's previous record of continuous electoral wins in Kelantan—four between 1959 and 1978.

Party or alliance		Votes	%	Seats	+/–
Pakatan Rakyat	Pan-Malaysian Islamic Party	273,965	45.07	9	+3
Pakatan Rakyat	People's Justice Party	60,333	9.93	3	+3
Pakatan Rakyat	Total	334,298	55.00	12	+6
Barisan Nasional	United Malays National Organisation	271,736	44.71	2	–6
Independents		1,769	0.29	0	0
Total		607,803	100.00	14	0
Valid votes		607,803	97.93		
Invalid/blank votes		12,829	2.07		
Total votes		620,632	100.00		
Registered voters/turnout		751,682	82.57		
Source: ElectionData.MY

==== Kuala Lumpur ====
Kuala Lumpur is a federal territory divided into 11 parliamentary constituencies. In this election, the opposition won ten seats (five are held by DAP, four by PKR, and one by PAS), while Barisan Nasional won only one. In the previous election, BN held 7 seats while DAP held 4 seats.

Party or alliance		Votes	%	Seats
Pakatan Rakyat	Democratic Action Party	173,892	34.94	5
Pakatan Rakyat	People's Justice Party	116,628	23.43	4
Pakatan Rakyat	Pan-Malaysian Islamic Party	17,857	3.59	1
Pakatan Rakyat	Total	308,377	61.96	10
Barisan Nasional	Malaysian Chinese Association	79,320	15.94	0
Barisan Nasional	United Malays National Organisation	60,207	12.10	1
Barisan Nasional	Parti Gerakan Rakyat Malaysia	49,348	9.91	0
Barisan Nasional	Total	188,875	37.95	1
Independents		489	0.10	0
Total		497,741	100.00	11
Valid votes		497,741	98.24	
Invalid/blank votes		8,931	1.76	
Total votes		506,672	100.00	
Registered voters/turnout		687,451	73.70	
Source: ElectionData.MY

==== Labuan ====
Party or alliance		Votes	%	Seats	+/–
Barisan Nasional	United Malays National Organisation	10,471	77.04	1	0
Pakatan Rakyat	Pan-Malaysian Islamic Party	1,106	8.14	0	0
Independents		2,014	14.82	0	New
Total		13,591	100.00	1	0
Valid votes		13,591	96.06		
Invalid/blank votes		558	3.94		
Total votes		14,149	100.00		
Registered voters/turnout		20,783	68.08		
Source: ElectionData.MY

==== Malacca ====
Party or alliance		Votes	%	Seats	+/–
Barisan Nasional	United Malays National Organisation	111,118	38.76	4	0
Barisan Nasional	Malaysian Chinese Association	53,604	18.70	1	–1
Barisan Nasional	Total	164,722	57.46	5	–1
Pakatan Rakyat	People's Justice Party	60,550	21.12	0	0
Pakatan Rakyat	Democratic Action Party	52,110	18.18	1	+1
Pakatan Rakyat	Pan-Malaysian Islamic Party	9,297	3.24	0	0
Pakatan Rakyat	Total	121,957	42.54	1	+1
Total		286,679	100.00	6	0
Valid votes		286,679	96.38		
Invalid/blank votes		10,771	3.62		
Total votes		297,450	100.00		
Registered voters/turnout		371,594	80.05		
Source: ElectionData.MY

==== Negeri Sembilan ====
Party or alliance		Votes	%	Seats	+/–
Barisan Nasional	United Malays National Organisation	116,262	34.06	5	0
Barisan Nasional	Malaysian Chinese Association	50,142	14.69	0	–2
Barisan Nasional	Malaysian Indian Congress	20,544	6.02	0	–1
Barisan Nasional	Total	186,948	54.76	5	–3
Pakatan Rakyat	Democratic Action Party	67,241	19.70	2	+2
Pakatan Rakyat	People's Justice Party	54,536	15.97	1	+1
Pakatan Rakyat	Pan-Malaysian Islamic Party	32,065	9.39	0	0
Pakatan Rakyat	Total	153,842	45.06	3	+3
Independents		601	0.18	0	0
Total		341,391	100.00	8	0
Valid votes		341,391	96.62		
Invalid/blank votes		11,937	3.38		
Total votes		353,328	100.00		
Registered voters/turnout		462,015	76.48		
Source: ElectionData.MY

==== Pahang ====
Party or alliance		Votes	%	Seats	+/–
Barisan Nasional	United Malays National Organisation	199,586	44.24	9	–1
Barisan Nasional	Malaysian Chinese Association	59,784	13.25	2	–1
Barisan Nasional	Malaysian Indian Congress	9,164	2.03	1	0
Barisan Nasional	Total	268,534	59.53	12	–2
Pakatan Rakyat	People's Justice Party	90,396	20.04	2	+2
Pakatan Rakyat	Pan-Malaysian Islamic Party	70,811	15.70	0	0
Pakatan Rakyat	Democratic Action Party	21,373	4.74	0	0
Pakatan Rakyat	Total	182,520	40.46	2	+2
Total		451,114	100.00	14	0
Valid votes		451,114	97.03		
Invalid/blank votes		13,794	2.97		
Total votes		464,908	100.00		
Registered voters/turnout		603,242	77.07		
Source: ElectionData.MY

==== Penang ====
The opposition dealt a heavy blow to the Barisan Nasional government by taking the state of Penang. Although Penang was regarded as a hotly contested state, the outcome unexpectedly turned out to be a landslide win with the opposition, the Democratic Action Party (DAP) gaining the majority of the state seats. Many seats saw the opposition winning over two-thirds of the votes, rather than the usual 50-50 distribution. BN only won 2 of the 13 parliamentary seats and 11 of the 40 state seats, its worst performance in Malaysian history.

In terms of party landscape, Gerakan, which has led the state since 1969 was defeated, and essentially wiped out of the political landscape, winning only 3 state seats and 2 parliamentary seats (none of which were in this state), not being able to hold on to a single seat in state or federal level—over 30 years of rule gone in one night. Some interesting individual constituencies include Jeff Ooi, who rose to fame with his blog that was constantly critical of the ruling government and made his first foray into politics this election under the DAP, winning the Jelutong parliamentary seat.

Another significant blow was the defeat of Gerakan Acting President, Tan Sri Dr. Koh Tsu Koon, who was looking to move up from state politics, decided not to run for his state seat and subsequently gave up his Chief Minister post of 18 years, to challenge the Batu Kawan parliamentary seat. Some speculated this was part of a larger ambition to be a cabinet member, only to lose to newcomer P. Ramasamy of the DAP by a large margin of 9,485 votes.

Party or alliance		Votes	%	Seats	+/–
Pakatan Rakyat	Democratic Action Party	219,821	40.39	7	+3
Pakatan Rakyat	People's Justice Party	94,350	17.34	4	+3
Pakatan Rakyat	Pan-Malaysian Islamic Party	28,100	5.16	0	0
Pakatan Rakyat	Total	342,271	62.89	11	+6
Barisan Nasional	United Malays National Organisation	93,007	17.09	2	–2
Barisan Nasional	Malaysian Chinese Association	55,349	10.17	0	–1
Barisan Nasional	Parti Gerakan Rakyat Malaysia	52,719	9.69	0	–3
Barisan Nasional	Total	201,075	36.95	2	–6
Independents		882	0.16	0	0
Total		544,228	100.00	13	0
Valid votes		544,228	98.12		
Invalid/blank votes		10,449	1.88		
Total votes		554,677	100.00		
Registered voters/turnout		709,323	78.20		
Source: ElectionData.MY

==== Perak ====
In Perak, the Barisan Nasional suffered shock losses, including MIC president S. Samy Vellu's Sungai Siput seat and PPP president M. Kayveas's Taiping seat. UMNO suffered several major setbacks in the party's traditional strongholds, while most MCA, MIC, PPP and Gerakan candidates were defeated by DAP candidates.

Perak was nonetheless one of the most tightly contested state of the nation with BN-Opposition parliamentary seats split into 13-11 and state seats into 28–31, still giving the opposition the chance to decide the state's government.

Party or alliance		Votes	%	Seats	+/–
Pakatan Rakyat	Democratic Action Party	189,706	22.51	6	+3
Pakatan Rakyat	People's Justice Party	155,997	18.51	2	+2
Pakatan Rakyat	Pan-Malaysian Islamic Party	87,032	10.33	2	+2
Pakatan Rakyat	Socialist Party of Malaysia	16,874	2.00	1	New
Pakatan Rakyat	Total	449,609	53.36	11	+8
Barisan Nasional	United Malays National Organisation	165,468	19.64	8	–3
Barisan Nasional	Malaysian Chinese Association	136,927	16.25	3	–1
Barisan Nasional	Parti Gerakan Rakyat Malaysia	43,545	5.17	1	–2
Barisan Nasional	Malaysian Indian Congress	28,492	3.38	1	–1
Barisan Nasional	People's Progressive Party	16,800	1.99	0	–1
Barisan Nasional	Total	391,232	46.43	13	–8
Independents		1,742	0.21	0	0
Total		842,583	100.00	24	0
Valid votes		842,583	96.61		
Invalid/blank votes		29,548	3.39		
Total votes		872,131	100.00		
Registered voters/turnout		1,196,160	72.91		
Source: ElectionData.MY

==== Perlis ====
Party or alliance		Votes	%	Seats	+/–
Barisan Nasional	United Malays National Organisation	57,263	60.15	3	0
Pakatan Rakyat	Pan-Malaysian Islamic Party	27,794	29.19	0	0
Pakatan Rakyat	People's Justice Party	10,150	10.66	0	0
Pakatan Rakyat	Total	37,944	39.85	0	0
Total		95,207	100.00	3	0
Valid votes		95,207	97.62		
Invalid/blank votes		2,325	2.38		
Total votes		97,532	100.00		
Registered voters/turnout		120,081	81.22		
Source: ElectionData.MY

==== Putrajaya ====
Party or alliance		Votes	%	Seats	+/–
Barisan Nasional	United Malays National Organisation	4,038	75.59	1	0
Pakatan Rakyat	Pan-Malaysian Islamic Party	1,304	24.41	0	0
Total		5,342	100.00	1	0
Valid votes		5,342	98.63		
Invalid/blank votes		74	1.37		
Total votes		5,416	100.00		
Registered voters/turnout		6,608	81.96		
Source: ElectionData.MY

==== Sabah ====
Party or alliance		Votes	%	Seats	+/–
Barisan Nasional	United Malays National Organisation	164,085	32.74	13	0
Barisan Nasional	UPKO	58,856	11.75	4	0
Barisan Nasional	United Sabah Party	44,525	8.89	3	–1
Barisan Nasional	Sabah Progressive Party	30,827	6.15	2	0
Barisan Nasional	Liberal Democratic Party	8,297	1.66	1	+1
Barisan Nasional	Parti Bersatu Rakyat Sabah			1	0
Barisan Nasional	Total	306,590	61.18	24	0
Pakatan Rakyat	People's Justice Party	133,796	26.70	0	0
Pakatan Rakyat	Democratic Action Party	30,930	6.17	1	+1
Pakatan Rakyat	Total	164,726	32.87	1	+1
Federated Sabah People's Front		942	0.19	0	New
Independents		28,855	5.76	0	–1
Total		501,113	100.00	25	0
Valid votes		501,113	96.45		
Invalid/blank votes		18,446	3.55		
Total votes		519,559	100.00		
Registered voters/turnout		752,132	69.08		
Source: ElectionData.MY

Registered voters in above table reflects the total number of voters for contested constituencies. Total electorate including the uncontested constituencies of Pensiangan and Kalabakan is 807,862.

==== Sarawak ====
Party or alliance		Votes	%	Seats	+/–
Barisan Nasional	Parti Pesaka Bumiputera Bersatu	131,243	25.03	14	+3
Barisan Nasional	Sarawak United Peoples' Party	119,264	22.75	6	0
Barisan Nasional	Sarawak Progressive Democratic Party	52,645	10.04	4	0
Barisan Nasional	Parti Rakyat Sarawak	33,410	6.37	6	New
Barisan Nasional	Total	336,562	64.20	30	+3
Pakatan Rakyat	Democratic Action Party	105,650	20.15	1	0
Pakatan Rakyat	People's Justice Party	44,020	8.40	0	0
Pakatan Rakyat	Pan-Malaysian Islamic Party	2,923	0.56	0	0
Pakatan Rakyat	Total	152,593	29.11	1	0
Sarawak National Party		8,615	1.64	0	0
Independents		26,473	5.05	0	0
Total		524,243	100.00	31	+3
Valid votes		524,243	98.35		
Invalid/blank votes		8,808	1.65		
Total votes		533,051	100.00		
Registered voters/turnout		819,274	65.06		
Source: ElectionData.MY

Registered voters in above table reflects the total number of voters for contested constituencies. Total electorate including the uncontested constituencies of Tanjong Manis, Igan, Kanowit, Selangau and Kapit is 912,454.

==== Selangor ====
Being the most developed state of the country and receiving the most absolute benefits due to spillover effects from developing the capital, Kuala Lumpur, Barisan Nasional party leaders were blindsided when Selangor rose to the call of the opposition. Many thought it was a safe stronghold of BN loyalists as it has been all along a centralist state leaning towards BN. According to The Star's summary of the state: "Barisan will undoubtedly retain the state but look out for some interesting, even tough, fights in certain parliamentary and state seats where the Opposition is fielding some strong candidates". Far from being the truth, BN ended up with only 5 of the 22 parliamentary seats and 20 of the 56 state seats, leaving the state government in opposition hands. The state Bernama news agency said that opposition parties had claimed 35 of the 56 seats in the Selangor state legislature but did not give a breakdown between PAS and the other parties.

Party or alliance		Votes	%	Seats	+/–
Pakatan Rakyat	People's Justice Party	323,005	27.41	9	+9
Pakatan Rakyat	Pan-Malaysian Islamic Party	171,751	14.57	4	+4
Pakatan Rakyat	Democratic Action Party	158,364	13.44	4	+4
Pakatan Rakyat	Total	653,120	55.42	17	+17
Barisan Nasional	United Malays National Organisation	229,417	19.47	4	–6
Barisan Nasional	Malaysian Chinese Association	165,116	14.01	1	–6
Barisan Nasional	Malaysian Indian Congress	105,072	8.92	0	–4
Barisan Nasional	Parti Gerakan Rakyat Malaysia	22,486	1.91	0	–1
Barisan Nasional	Total	522,091	44.30	5	–17
Parti Rakyat Malaysia		1,332	0.11	0	0
Independents		1,895	0.16	0	0
Total		1,178,438	100.00	22	0
Valid votes		1,178,438	97.47		
Invalid/blank votes		30,593	2.53		
Total votes		1,209,031	100.00		
Registered voters/turnout		1,565,493	77.23		
Source: ElectionData.MY

==== Terengganu ====
Party or alliance		Votes	%	Seats	+/–
Barisan Nasional	United Malays National Organisation	239,922	55.11	7	–1
Pakatan Rakyat	Pan-Malaysian Islamic Party	145,955	33.53	1	+1
Pakatan Rakyat	People's Justice Party	48,786	11.21	0	0
Pakatan Rakyat	Total	194,741	44.73	1	+1
Independents		685	0.16	0	0
Total		435,348	100.00	8	0
Valid votes		435,348	98.23		
Invalid/blank votes		7,857	1.77		
Total votes		443,205	100.00		
Registered voters/turnout		521,597	84.97		
Source: ElectionData.MY

== Aftermath ==
=== Pullout of SAPP from BN ===
Sabah Progressive Party (SAPP) has decided to pull out of the 14-member Barisan Nasional Government, taking away two MPs and at least two of its four assemblymen who will remain independent.

The decision to pull out was made at the SAPP supreme council meeting where its president Datuk Yong Teck Lee obtained the support of nearly all of its 35 members and declared that SAPP was not joining Pakatan Rakyat.

Yong said his party would remain independent in the opposition bench until a time came when SAPP was ready to be back in government.

=== Establishment of Opposition-led state governments ===
Although Malaysia is a federal state, political scientists have suggested that its "federalism is highly centralised":

Our federalism gives the federal government not only the most legislative and executive powers but also the most important sources of revenue. State governments are excluded from the revenues of income tax, export, import and excise duties, and they are also largely restricted from borrowing internationally. They have to depend on revenue from forests, lands, mines, petroleum, the entertainment industry, and finally, transfer payments from the central government.

The 2008 general elections saw a loose coalition between the Democratic Action Party, People's Justice Party and Pan-Malaysian Islamic Party win a majority in five of the thirteen state legislative assemblies. Previously, the ruling Barisan Nasional coalition controlled twelve of the state governments, with the exception of Kelantan. In an editorial, The Sun suggested that this would herald changes for the relationship between state and federal governments:

[Civil servants] have got used to Malaysia acting like a unitary state because most of the time all the states are ruled by BN parties. And the states act as one because of political control effected through the state BN. But as a result of the general election five states are now ruled by non-BN parties and there is likelihood they are going to act more individually than they have been in the past.

In Penang, the Democratic Action Party (DAP) formed the next state government with Lim Guan Eng, who is also the party's Secretary General, as its designated next Chief Minister. Two days later, the new Chief Minister appointed two Deputy Chief Ministers, Penanti assemblyman Mohammad Fairus Khairuddin of PKR and Prai assemblyman P. Ramasamy of DAP. P. Ramasamy became the first ethnic Indian to be appointed as deputy chief minister in a Malaysian state.

The coalition consisting of mainly Pan-Malaysian Islamic Party (PAS) formed the next state government in Kedah, after winning 22 out of 36 seats. Out of the 22 seats, 16 were won by PAS, 4 by PKR, and 1 each by DAP and an independent candidate. Kedah's state PAS commissioner, Azizan Abdul Razak, has been sworn in as the ninth Kedah Menteri Besar. The sole independent candidate who won, V. Arumugam, was chosen to be one of the 10 state executive councillors for the state.

In Kelantan, Nik Aziz Nik Mat received his letter of appointment as Kelantan Menteri Besar on the night of 11 March for the fifth consecutive term from the Sultan of Kelantan, Sultan Ismail Petra. Three state assemblymen, including Wan Ubaidah Wan Omar (Kijang), Dr Fazli Hassan (Temangan) and Che Abdullah Mat Nawi (Wakaf Baru), were also appointed as state executive councillors.

The next designated Menteri Besar of Selangor was speculated to be PKR's Khalid Ibrahim. However, Khalid failed to get the consent from the Sultan, who stated he would like to meet representative from DAP and PAS first. After meeting representative of each party, Khalid Ibrahim was finally sworn in on 13 March 2008. The ten other state executive councillors (exco) were sworn in on 24 March. This marked the first time where four out of ten exco members were women and where five out of ten of them were non-Malays.

BN-Opposition parliamentary seats in Perak were split into 13-11 and state seats into 28–31, still giving the opposition the chance to decide the state's government.

It was confirmed Mohammad Nizar Jamaludin was to become the next Menteri Besar of Perak by the Regent of Perak Raja Nazrin Shah. Sitiawan state assemblyperson Ngeh Koo Ham was also appointed "Senior Exco Member". An Indian candidate will be appointed the second deputy Menteri Besar, the candidates being DAP's A Sivanesan (Sungkai), KS Keshvinder Singh (Malim Nawar), V. Sivakumar (Tronoh) and A Sivasubramaniam (Buntong), and PKR's S Kesavan but this never materialised.

The appointment of the Perak Menteri Besar was not without drama as the coalition was not seen as cooperative. After the regent of Perak give consent on the informal coalition of DAP-PKR-PAS, each party submitted one name for the post of the new Menteri Besar, the regent of Perak having selected PAS nominee, Mohamad Nizar. DAP assemblymen were instructed to boycott the swearing-in ceremony which was supposed to be held on 13 March 2008 as instructed by DAP advisor Lim Kit Siang, a statement which he retracted and apologised to the Perak Sultanate the following day. Seeing a tussle between DAP and PAS, the Regent of Perak decided to postpone the swearing in ceremony until he sees a letter of undertaking signed by all 31 assemblyman voicing support of the appointment of Mohamad Nizar Jamaludin as the Menteri Besar.

By February 2009, the balance of power in Perak was tipped in favour of BN following the defection of four Opposition assemblymen, leading to a political crisis in the state and the eventual retaking of Perak by BN.

=== Political crisis in Terengganu ===
The state of Terengganu, which Barisan Nasional won with a two-thirds majority, was the last state to have no appointed Menteri Besar. In the formation of the new Terengganu state government, the government under Prime Minister Abdullah recommended Jerteh assemblyman Idris Jusoh, as Menteri Besar, which received full support of twenty-three of the 24 Barisan Nasional state assemblymen who elected. But the Sultan of Terengganu announced that Kijal assemblyman Ahmad Said had been appointed instead.

The Prime Minister claimed that the appointment of Ahmad Said was unconstitutional as it went against the wishes of the assemblymen and the Prime Minister's office who have supported Idris Jusoh candidacy for Menteri Besar. Ahmad Said was subsequently stripped of his UMNO membership "for disobeying the party's leadership".

Eventually the Prime Minister and Sultan resolved the stand-off, with Ahmad being appointed as Menteri Besar.

=== Proposed return of elected Kuala Lumpur mayors ===
On 10 March, Cheras MP Tan Kok Wai (DAP) mooted the possibility of having mayoral elections for Kuala Lumpur, but the Federal Constitution needs to be amended to allow such a change. There had not been an elected mayor in Malaysia since such elections were suspended in 1965.

=== Penang protests ===
On 14 March, several hundred protesters from the Malay community gathered in Chinese majority Penang as a response to a declaration by the Penang government under Penang Chief Minister Lim Guan Eng that they would abolish certain aspects of the New Economical Policy (NEP), which implementation remains a contentious issue in the country. The protesters were dispersed by riot police officers, but vowed to return for more protests.

=== Economy ===
Political uncertainty as a result of the formation of a significantly different Malaysian government, coupled with worries of a global economic slowdown due to negative economic development from the United States, led to uneasiness among investors in the benchmark Kuala Lumpur Composite Index (KLCI) and an immediate plunge in the KLCI.

On 10 March, the first trading day since the election, stocks in the KLCI fell 9.5%, or 123.11 points, from 1,296.33 points to 1,173.22 points by 5.00 pm (MST), its biggest one-day decline in a decade. Trading in the KLCI was automatically halted for an hour after stocks fell beyond the 20% by 29.8%, as a measure to curb panic selling; the KLCI resumed trading at 4.00 pm. Among trading companies severely affected were government-linked companies, including blue chip Sime Darby, (down 50%), UEM World (down 24%), Tenaga Nasional (down 15%) and the Malaysian Resources Corporation (down 34–39%). By the end of 12 March, the KLCI was able to recoup 60% of its losses, before suffering losses due to unfavourable developments on the ongoing subprime mortgage crisis in the US. The value of the ringgit had also dropped by a little over 1% against the US dollar, trading at RM3.2075 per US dollar on 10 March, down from the previous trading day's close of around RM3.166 to the dollar. Government bond prices ticked down at the open, with the yield on the 10-year benchmark rising up to 3.754 percent from 3.708 percent on Friday. An analyst remarked foreign investors had lost the political stability premium enjoyed prior to the election and might abandon investment prospects in Malaysia.

Doubts on the prospect of large scale projects initiated or managed by the Abdullah Badawi administration between 2004 and 2008 were also highlighted; the Opposition vowed to assess major government projects, including the DAP's plans to review the Penang Global City Centre, a $7.8 billion real estate development project in Penang which have not gain approval from the local state council even after launching ceremony was held officiated by Malaysia's prime minister, Abdullah Badawi. The administration's previous proposals to form economical hubs in the northern, eastern and southern regions of the Malaysian Peninsula, Sabah and Sarawak had previously attracted investors, local and foreign, and boasted the KLCI, but also raised questions on how the cost of billion-ringgit projects will be paid for.

Other analysts see the emergence of a stronger Opposition in the parliament as an opportunity for improved transparency and corporate governance. A managing director of a multinational asset management house commented "A powerful opposition is a positive development in the longer term, providing some checks and balances for trillion-ringgit government spending."

Standard & Poor's Ratings Services reports the general election has no immediate effect on the sovereign ratings on Malaysia and still maintains both the local and foreign currency rating for the country. It added budgetary decisions and fiscal policies are still in the ruling party's hands as it only requires a 51% majority instead of a two-thirds majority. Moody's Rating Service also shares in view and did not change its sovereign rating of A3.

=== International reaction ===
On 9 March United States State Department spokesman Kurtis Cooper issued a statement that the US government is ready to co-operate with the newly formed Malaysian government, adding Abdullah remains a viable partner for the US "on a wide range of issues of mutual interest", despite BN's heavy losses in the election and decreased popularity of the party. Among them was the planned conclusion of stalled Free Trade Agreement negotiations between Malaysia and the US before the 2008 United States presidential election.

== See also ==
- 2008 Malaysian state elections
