= Marang (federal constituency) =

Federal constituency of Terengganu, Malaysia

Marang (P037)
Terengganu constituency

Federal constituency
- Legislature: Dewan Rakyat
- MP: Abdul Hadi Awang; PN
- Constituency created: 1984
- First contested: 1986
- Last contested: 2022

Demographics
- Population (2020): 162,312
- Electors (2023): 133,025
- Area (km²): 714
- Pop. density (per km²): 227.3

Marang is a federal constituency in Marang District and a portion of Kuala Terengganu District, Terengganu, Malaysia, that has been represented in the Dewan Rakyat since 1986.

The federal constituency was created in the 1984 redistribution and is mandated to return a single member to the Dewan Rakyat under the first past the post voting system.

== Demographics ==
Ethnic breakdown of Marang's electorate as of 2022
1. Malay (97.5%)
2. Chinese (1.86%)
3. Tamil (0.08%)
4. Other ethnicities (0.52%)
Age breakdown of Marang's electorate as of 2022
1. 18-20 (7.26%)
2. 21-29 (24.5%)
3. 30-39 (26.0%)
4. 40-49 (16.6%)
5. 50-59 (12.5%)
6. 60-69 (8.37%)
7. 70-79 (3.50%)
8. 80-89 (1.07%)
9. above 90 (0.14%)
Gender breakdown of Marang's electorate as of 2022
1. Male (49.7%)
2. Female (50.3%)

== History ==
=== Polling districts ===
According to the federal gazette issued on 31 October 2022, the Marang constituency is divided into 47 polling districts.

State constituency	Polling district	Code	Location
Alur Limbat (N17)	Pulau Manis	037/17/01	SK Serada
Alur Limbat (N17)	Rawai	037/17/02	SK Simpang Rawai
Alur Limbat (N17)	Tasik	037/17/03	SK Tasek; Balai Raya Kg. Wakaf Dua
Alur Limbat (N17)	Banggul Tok Ku	037/17/04	SK Kampung Baharu Serada
Alur Limbat (N17)	Beladau Selat	037/17/05	SK Bangol Katong
Alur Limbat (N17)	Kepung	037/17/06	SK Kepong
Alur Limbat (N17)	Padang Midin	037/17/07	SK Padang Midin
Alur Limbat (N17)	Gelugur Kedai	037/17/08	SK Gelugor; SMK Padang Midin
Alur Limbat (N17)	Tebakang	037/17/09	SK Simpang Rawai
Bukit Payung (N18)	Kampung Laut	037/18/01	SK Kampong Bukit Chenderiang
Bukit Payung (N18)	Atas Tol	037/18/02	SK Atas Tol
Bukit Payung (N18)	Paya Resak	037/18/03	SK Paya Resak
Bukit Payung (N18)	Kedai Buluh	037/18/04	SK Kedai Buluh
Bukit Payung (N18)	Surau Haji Daud	037/18/05	SK Tok Dir
Bukit Payung (N18)	Undang	037/18/06	SK Undang
Bukit Payung (N18)	Bukit Payung	037/18/07	SK Bukit Payong
Bukit Payung (N18)	Pekan Bukti Payung	037/18/08	Tadika Yayasan Islam Terengganu Cawangan Bukit Payung
Bukit Payung (N18)	Mak Kemas	037/18/09	SMK Seri Payong
Bukit Payung (N18)	Surau Panjang	037/18/10	SMK Sultan Mansor
Ru Rendang (N19)	Rusila	037/19/01	SK Rusila
Ru Rendang (N19)	Medan Jaya	037/19/02	SMK Rusila
Ru Rendang (N19)	Sentul Patah	037/19/03	SK Sentol Patah
Ru Rendang (N19)	Marang	037/19/04	SK Marang
Ru Rendang (N19)	Bandar Marang	037/19/05	SMA Marang
Ru Rendang (N19)	Seberang Marang	037/19/06	SK Bukit Gasing
Ru Rendang (N19)	Bukit Gasing	037/19/07	SMK Seberang Marang
Ru Rendang (N19)	Batangan	037/19/08	SK Batangan
Ru Rendang (N19)	Ru Muda	037/19/09	SK Seberang Marang
Ru Rendang (N19)	Pulau Kerengga	037/19/10	SK Pulau Kerengga
Ru Rendang (N19)	Kelulut	037/19/11	SK Kelulut
Pengkalan Berangan (N20)	Sungai Serai	037/20/01	SK Gondang
Pengkalan Berangan (N20)	Binjai Rendah	037/20/02	SMK Bukit Sawa
Pengkalan Berangan (N20)	Cerang China	037/20/03	SMK Wakaf Tapai
Pengkalan Berangan (N20)	Wakaf Tapai	037/20/04	SK Wakaf Tapai
Pengkalan Berangan (N20)	Jerung Surau	037/20/05	SK Jerong
Pengkalan Berangan (N20)	Bukit Parit	037/20/06	Institut Latihan Perindustrian Marang
Pengkalan Berangan (N20)	Pengkalan Berangan	037/20/07	SK Pengkalan Berangan
Pengkalan Berangan (N20)	Kubu	037/20/08	SK Kubu
Pengkalan Berangan (N20)	Mercang	037/20/09	SK Merchang
Pengkalan Berangan (N20)	Pasir Putih	037/20/10	SK Pasir Puteh
Pengkalan Berangan (N20)	Jambu Bongkok	037/20/11	SMK Datuk Awang Jabar
Pengkalan Berangan (N20)	Gong Balai	037/20/12	SK Gong Balai
Pengkalan Berangan (N20)	Padang Mengkuang	037/20/13	SK Padang Mengkuang
Pengkalan Berangan (N20)	Durian Guling	037/20/14	SMA Durian Guling
Pengkalan Berangan (N20)	Bukit Jejulung	037/20/15	SK Bukit Jejulong

=== Representation history ===
Members of Parliament for Marang
Parliament	No	Years	Member	Party	Vote Share
Constituency created from Kuala Nerus, Ulu Terengganu, Kuala Terengganu and Dungun
7th	P034	1986–1990	Abdul Rahman Bakar (عبدالرحمن بن بكر)	BN (UMNO)	13,654; 51.20%
8th	P034	1990–1995	Abdul Hadi Awang (عبدالهادي اواڠ)	APU (PAS)	17,736; 49.97%
9th	P037	1995–1999	Abdul Hadi Awang (عبدالهادي اواڠ)	APU (PAS)	21,945; 51.03%
10th	P037	1999–2004	Abdul Hadi Awang (عبدالهادي اواڠ)	BA (PAS)	30,183; 63.32%
11th	P037	2004–2008	Abdul Rahman Bakar (عبدالرحمن بن بكر)	BN (UMNO)	28,076; 50.15%
12th	P037	2008–2013	Abdul Hadi Awang (عبدالهادي اواڠ)	PR (PAS)	33,435; 52.14%
13th	P037	2013–2016	Abdul Hadi Awang (عبدالهادي اواڠ)	PR (PAS)	42,984; 53.17%
13th	P037	2016–2018	Abdul Hadi Awang (عبدالهادي اواڠ)	GS (PAS)	42,984; 53.17%
14th	P037	2018–2020	Abdul Hadi Awang (عبدالهادي اواڠ)	GS (PAS)	53,749; 59.27%
14th	P037	2020–2022	Abdul Hadi Awang (عبدالهادي اواڠ)	PN (PAS)	53,749; 59.27%
15th	P037	2022–present	Abdul Hadi Awang (عبدالهادي اواڠ)	PN (PAS)	73,115; 67.04%

=== State constituency ===
Parliamentary constituency	State constituency						
Parliamentary constituency	1954–1959*	1959–1974	1974–1986	1986–1995	1995–2004	2004–2018	2018–present
Marang					Alur Limbat		
Marang				Binjai			
Marang				Bukit Payung			
Marang					Pengkalan Berangan		
Marang				Ru Rendang			
Marang				Serada			

=== Historical boundaries ===
State Constituency	Area			
State Constituency	1984	1994	2003	2018
Alur Limbat		Alur Limbat; Kampung Gong Kiat; Kampung Rawai; Kampung Tebakang; Serada		
Binjai	Binjai; Kampung Batu Penunggul; Kampung Bukit Parit; Kampung Lubuk Batu; Wakaf Tapai			
Bukit Payung	Bukit Payung; Kampung Bukit; Kampung Pengkalan Setar; Kampung Undang; Kedai Buluh	Bukit Payung; Kampung Belukar Jambu; Kampung Bukit; Kampung Undang; Kedai Buluh		
Pengkalan Berangan		Binjai; Kampung Gong Balai; Kampung Jambu Bongkok; Merchang; Wakaf Tapai		
Ru Rendang	Kampung Bukit Gasing; Kampung Pengkalan Kuin; Kampung Sentol Patah; Ru Rendang; Taman Seri Desa	Kampung Bukit Gasing; Kampung Kelulut; Kampung Paya; Marang; Ru Rendang		
Serada	Alur Limbat; Kampung Kepong; Kampung Padang Midin; Kampung Rawai; Serada			

=== Current state assembly members ===
No.	State Constituency	Member	Coalition (Party)
N17	Alur Limbat	Ariffin Deraman	PN (PAS)
N18	Bukit Payung	Mohd. Nor Hamzah	PN (PAS)
N19	Ru Rendang	Ahmad Samsuri Mokhtar	PN (PAS)
N20	Pengkalan Berangan	Sulaiman Sulong	PN (PAS)

=== Local governments & postcodes ===
No.	State Constituency	Local Government	Postcode
N17	Alur Limbat	Kuala Terengganu City Council (Serada area); Marang District Council	21040, 21050, 21070, 21080, 21100 Kuala Terengganu; 21400 Bukit Payong; 21600, 21610 Marang
N18	Bukit Payung	Marang District Council	21040, 21050, 21070, 21080, 21100 Kuala Terengganu; 21400 Bukit Payong; 21600, 21610 Marang
N19	Ru Rendang	Marang District Council	21040, 21050, 21070, 21080, 21100 Kuala Terengganu; 21400 Bukit Payong; 21600, 21610 Marang
N20	Pengkalan Berangan	Marang District Council	21040, 21050, 21070, 21080, 21100 Kuala Terengganu; 21400 Bukit Payong; 21600, 21610 Marang

== Election results ==
Malaysian general election, 2022
Party	Candidate	Votes	%	∆%
PAS	Abdul Hadi Awang	73,115	67.04	▲7.77
BN	Jasmira Othman	31,386	28.78	▼6.25
PH	Azhar Abdul Shukur	4,140	3.80	▲3.80
PEJUANG	Zarawi Sulong	427	0.39	▲0.39
Total valid votes		109,068	100.00	
Total rejected ballots		948		
Unreturned ballots		269		
Turnout		110,312	82.78	▼4.97
Registered electors		131,756		
Majority		41,729	38.26	▲14.05
PAS hold		Swing		
Source(s) https://lom.agc.gov.my/ilims/upload/portal/akta/outputp/1753269/PUB608%20PARLIMEN%20TERENGGANU.pdf

Malaysian general election, 2018
Party	Candidate	Votes	%	∆%
PAS	Abdul Hadi Awang	53,749	59.27	▲6.10
BN	Mohamad Nor Endot	31,795	35.06	▼11.77
PKR	Zarawi Sulong	5,138	5.67	▲5.67
Total valid votes		90,682	100.00	
Total rejected ballots		1,028		
Unreturned ballots		336		
Turnout		92,046	87.75	▼2.38
Registered electors		104,898		
Majority		21,954	24.21	▲17.87
PAS hold		Swing		
Source(s) "His Majesty's Government Gazette - Notice of Contested Election, Parliament for the State of Terengganu [P.U. (B) 235/2018]" (PDF). Attorney General's Chambers of Malaysia. 3 May 2018. "Federal Government Gazette - Results of Contested Election and Statements of the Poll after the Official Addition of Votes, Parliamentary Constituencies for the State of Terengganu [P.U. (B) 309/2018]" (PDF). Attorney General's Chambers of Malaysia. 28 May 2018.

Malaysian general election, 2013
Party	Candidate	Votes	%	∆%
PAS	Abdul Hadi Awang	42,984	53.17	▲1.03
BN	Yahya Khatib Mohamad	37,860	46.83	▼1.03
Total valid votes		80,844	100.00	
Total rejected ballots		805		
Unreturned ballots		180		
Turnout		81,829	90.13	▲3.24
Registered electors		90,795		
Majority		5,124	6.34	▲2.06
PAS hold		Swing		
Source(s) "Federal Government Gazette - Notice of Contested Election, Parliament for the State of Terengganu [P.U. (B) 172/2013]" (PDF). Attorney General's Chambers of Malaysia. 26 April 2013. "Federal Government Gazette - Results of Contested Election and Statements of the Poll after the Official Addition of Votes, Parliamentary Constituencies for the State of Terengganu [P.U. (B) 213/2013]" (PDF). Attorney General's Chambers of Malaysia. 22 May 2013.

Malaysian general election, 2008
Party	Candidate	Votes	%	∆%
PAS	Abdul Hadi Awang	33,435	52.14	▲2.29
BN	Ahmad Ramzi Mohamad Zubir	30,688	47.86	▼2.29
Total valid votes		64,123	100.00	
Total rejected ballots		806		
Unreturned ballots		79		
Turnout		65,008	86.89	▼1.95
Registered electors		74,813		
Majority		2,747	4.28	▲3.98
PAS gain from BN		Swing		?

Malaysian general election, 2004
Party	Candidate	Votes	%	∆%
BN	Abdul Rahman Bakar	28,076	50.15	▲13.47
PAS	Abdul Hadi Awang	27,913	49.85	▼13.47
Total valid votes		55,989	100.00	
Total rejected ballots		866		
Unreturned ballots		331		
Turnout		57,186	88.84	▲5.83
Registered electors		64,369		
Majority		163	0.30	▼26.34
BN gain from PAS		Swing		?

Malaysian general election, 1999
Party	Candidate	Votes	%	∆%
PAS	Abdul Hadi Awang	30,183	63.32	▲12.29
BN	Muda Mamat	17,483	36.68	▼12.29
Total valid votes		47,666	100.00	
Total rejected ballots		840		
Unreturned ballots		105		
Turnout		48,611	83.01	▲1.16
Registered electors		58,560		
Majority		12,700	26.64	▲24.58
PAS hold		Swing		

Malaysian general election, 1995
Party	Candidate	Votes	%	∆%
PAS	Abdul Hadi Awang	21,945	51.03	▲1.06
BN	Abdul Rahman Bakar	21,063	48.97	▼0.56
Total valid votes		43,008	100.00	
Total rejected ballots		1,204		
Unreturned ballots		83		
Turnout		44,295	81.85	▼2.85
Registered electors		54,117		
Majority		882	2.06	▲1.62
PAS hold		Swing		

Malaysian general election, 1990
Party	Candidate	Votes	%	∆%
PAS	Abdul Hadi Awang	17,736	49.97	▲1.07
BN	Abdul Rahman Bakar	17,575	49.53	▼1.67
Independent	Wan Deraman Wan Nik	176	0.50	▲0.50
Total valid votes		35,487	100.00	
Total rejected ballots		685		
Unreturned ballots		0		
Turnout		36,172	84.70	▲2.09
Registered electors		42,706		
Majority		161	0.44	▼1.96
PAS gain from BN		Swing		?

Malaysian general election, 1986
Party	Candidate	Votes	%
BN	Abdul Rahman Bakar	13,654	51.20
PAS	Abdul Hadi Awang	13,015	48.80
Total valid votes		26,669	100.00
Total rejected ballots		764	
Unreturned ballots		0	
Turnout		27,433	82.61
Registered electors		33,206	
Majority		639	2.40
This was a new constituency created.
