= Chidlaw =

Chidlaw is a surname. Notable people with the surname include:

- Benjamin W. Chidlaw (1900–1977), United States Air Force officer
- Patricia Chidlaw (born 1951), American painter
- Paul Chidlaw (1900–1989), American painter
- Robert L. Chidlaw-Roberts (1896–1989), Welsh World War I flying ace
