= Abdul Hadi Awang =

Malaysian politician

Yang Berhormat Tan Sri Dato' Seri Tuan Guru Abdul Hadi Awang PSM SSMT MP
- عبدالهادي اواڠ
- Abdul Hadi in 2026

11th Menteri Besar of Terengganu
- In office 2 December 1999 – 25 March 2004
- Monarch: Mizan Zainal Abidin
- Preceded by: Wan Mokhtar Ahmad
- Succeeded by: Idris Jusoh
- Constituency: Ru Rendang

8th Leader of the Opposition
- In office 9 September 2002 – 2 March 2004
- Monarch: Syed Sirajuddin
- Prime Minister: Mahathir Mohamad (2002–2003); Abdullah Ahmad Badawi (2003–2004)
- Preceded by: Fadzil Noor
- Succeeded by: Lim Kit Siang
- Constituency: Marang

7th President of the Malaysian Islamic Party
- Incumbent
- Assumed office 12 June 2002 (Acting: 12 June 2002 – 12/14 September 2003)
- Deputy: Hassan Shukri (2003–2005); Nasharudin Mat Isa (2005–2011); Mohamad Sabu (2011–2015); Tuan Ibrahim Tuan Man (since 2015)
- Spiritual Leader: Nik Abdul Aziz Nik Mat (until 2015); Haron Din (2015–2016); Hashim Jasin (since 2016)
- Preceded by: Fadzil Noor

Member of the Malaysian Parliament for Marang
- Incumbent
- Assumed office 8 March 2008
- Preceded by: Abdul Rahman Bakar (BN–UMNO)
- Majority: 2,747 (2008); 5,124 (2013); 21,954 (2018); 41,729 (2022)
- In office 21 October 1990 – 21 March 2004
- Preceded by: Abdul Rahman Bakar (BN–UMNO)
- Succeeded by: Abdul Rahman Bakar (BN–UMNO)
- Majority: 161 (1990); 882 (1995); 12,700 (1999)

Member of the Terengganu State Legislative Assembly for Ru Rendang
- In office 3 August 1986 – 9 May 2018
- Preceded by: New constituency
- Succeeded by: Ahmad Samsuri Mokhtar (PAS)
- Majority: 531 (1986); 853 (1990); 1,394 (1995); 3,843 (1999); 1,435 (2004); 2,686 (2008); 2,819 (2013)

Member of the Terengganu State Legislative Assembly for Marang
- In office 22 April 1982 – 3 August 1986
- Preceded by: Tengku Zahid Musa (BN-UMNO)
- Succeeded by: Constituency abolished
- Majority: 133 (1982)

Other Positions
- 2020–2022: Special Envoy of Malaysia to the Middle East

Faction represented in Dewan Rakyat
- 1990–2004: Malaysian Islamic Party
- 2008–2020: Malaysian Islamic Party
- 2020–: Perikatan Nasional

Faction represented in the Terengganu State Legislative Assembly
- 1982–2018: Malaysian Islamic Party

Personal details
- Born: Abdul Hadi bin Awang; 20 October 1947 (age 79) Marang, Terengganu, Malayan Union
- Citizenship: Malaysia
- Party: PAS (1964–present)
- Other political affiliations: Alliance (1971–1973); BN (1974–1978); APM (1990–1996); Barisan Alternatif (1998–2004); Pakatan Rakyat (2008–2015); Gagasan Sejahtera (2016–2020); PN (since 2020)
- Spouses: Zainab Awang Ngah; Norzita Taat
- Relations: Zaharudin Muhammad (son-in-law); Mohd Akmal Kamaruddin (son-in-law); Mohd Shukri Ramli (affinal)
- Children: 14 (including Muhammad Khalil)
- Parents: Awang Mohamad Abd Rahman (father); Aminah Yusuf (mother)
- Education: Islamic University of Madinah (BA); Al-Azhar University (MA)
- Occupation: Politician; religious teacher
- Website: presiden.pas.org.my/v2/

Abdul Hadi bin Awang (Note: Jawi: عبدالهادي بن اواڠ) (born 20 October 1947) is a Malaysian politician and religious teacher serving as the Member of Parliament (MP) for Marang from 1990 to 2004 and again since 2008. A president of Malaysian Islamic Party (PAS), he served as the 11th Menteri Besar of Terengganu from 1999 to 2004. Hadi previously was the 8th opposition leader from 2002 to 2004 and was formerly a vice-president of the International Union of Muslim Scholars.

Born in Terengganu, Hadi received his education in neighbourhood schools before furthering his studies at the Islamic University of Madinah between 1969 and 1973, and later at Al-Azhar University. Upon his return to Malaysia, he joined Angkatan Belia Islam Malaysia in 1977, where he quickly became its Terengganu state chief. A year later, Hadi joined PAS and contested the Marang state constituency in the 1978 general election. He rose quickly through the ranks. He became the deputy president of PAS in 1989 when Fadzil Noor was elected to the party presidency. He remained as the deputy until 2002, when Fadzil died of a heart attack, resulting in Hadi succeeding him as the president of PAS and has been the longest-serving president in the party's history.

Hadi's 1981 sermon known as the Amanat Hadi, and remarks he made about Christian missionaries in 2016, have both drawn criticism; the latter led two private citizens to file a suit against him under the Sedition Act in 2020.

== Early life, family and education ==
Hadi was born on 20 October 1947 in Kampung Rusila, Marang, Terengganu.

He studied at the Islamic University of Madinah between 1969 and 1973, graduating in Islamic shariah, and then took a master's degree at Al-Azhar University in Cairo between 1974 and 1976.

== Early career ==
Hadi's father died in 1976, and Hadi succeeded him as khatib at the Rusila mosque, delivering the Friday sermon. His Friday lectures at the mosque drew large congregations.

== Political career ==
=== Early political career ===
Hadi joined PAS in 1964 at the age of 17 and became a member of its central committee in 1977. Hadi contested the Marang state constituency at the 1978 general election and lost by 64 votes to Tengku Zahid Tengku Musa of Barisan Nasional. He won the Marang state seat in 1982. At the 1986 general election he lost the Marang parliamentary seat while holding his state constituency, and he won and held both seats at the 1990, 1995 and 1999 general elections.

Fadzil Noor died in June 2002 and Hadi took over as acting president that month. He was confirmed in the post at the party muktamar the following year, and has led PAS since 2002. He was Leader of the Opposition from 2002 to 2004, succeeding Fadzil Noor.

=== 2004 general election ===
At the general election of 21 March 2004 the Barisan Nasional took 198 of the 219 parliamentary seats and recaptured Terengganu, ending Hadi's term as Menteri Besar. Hadi lost his own seat to an UMNO candidate, and PAS was displaced by the Democratic Action Party as the largest opposition party, though its share of the popular vote rose slightly, to 15.8 per cent from 15 per cent in 1999. Writing for the Institute of Defence and Strategic Studies, Yang Razali Kassim attributed the outcome to Abdullah Ahmad Badawi's Islam Hadhari platform winning back Malay voters who had left the Barisan Nasional in 1999.

=== Consolidation of the party presidency ===
The PAS constitution vests final authority in the Syura Ulama Council, a seventeen-member appointed body of religious scholars headed by the party's spiritual leader, with the central committee acting as the body that implements its decisions. After the death of the spiritual leader Nik Abdul Aziz Nik Mat on 12 February 2015, Hadi moved the centre of power in PAS towards the presidency. Writing for the ISEAS-Yusof Ishak Institute, James Chai argues that this was done without amending the party constitution, and instead through the president's ability to move people between the central committee and the council, an ulama-led ideological realignment at every level of the party, and the lesser personal standing of the spiritual leaders who followed Nik Aziz.

Chai further argues that Hadi decided on the party's alliances with UMNO and later with Bersatu and Perikatan Nasional without the consent of the council, moved the party's public positions to the far right, restricted internal dissent, and marginalised Nik Aziz's family within the party. The faction known as the Erdogans, who favoured an inclusive approach to Islam and the admission of members without religious scholarship to the council, lost the 2015 party elections as a bloc and left to found Parti Amanah Negara.

=== Coalition alliances ===
The Pakatan Rakyat opposition coalition, of which PAS was a member alongside the DAP and the People's Justice Party, broke up in 2015. An RSIS commentary attributed the collapse to recrimination over hudud between PAS and the DAP, and to the crisis inside PAS that had entrenched the conservative faction and ousted its professionals wing. Hadi had sought a partnership with UMNO from 2008, a course Nik Aziz opposed. The two parties formalised the Muafakat Nasional pact on 14 September 2019. PAS joined Bersatu in Perikatan Nasional in 2020; Khairuddin Razali, a former member of the Syura Ulama Council, said the council had never discussed that alliance. Khairuddin was removed from the central committee and the council in January 2022.

=== Syariah Courts (Criminal Jurisdiction) Bill ===
On 6 April 2017 Hadi tabled a private member's bill to amend the Syariah Courts (Criminal Jurisdiction) Act 1965. It would have raised the maximum penalties available to syariah courts from three years' imprisonment, a fine of RM5,000 and six strokes of the cane to 30 years, RM100,000 and 100 strokes. The Speaker, Pandikar Amin Mulia, deferred debate to the following sitting, prompting protests from opposition members. The PAS deputy president Tuan Ibrahim Tuan Man called the tabling a success.

=== 2018 general election ===
At the 2018 general election the PAS popular vote rose from 1.6 million in 2013 to more than two million, while its parliamentary representation fell from 21 seats to 18. The party held Kelantan, taking nine of the state's fourteen parliamentary seats and 37 of its 45 state seats, won Terengganu from the Barisan Nasional and 15 of 36 state seats in Kedah, but its presence in Selangor, Perak and Johor was substantially reduced.

=== 2022 general election ===
At the 2022 general election Hadi retained Marang with 73,115 votes and a majority of 41,729. PAS contested 64 parliamentary seats and won 43, its best result and double the number it won in 1999. Barisan Nasional challenged the Marang result, but the Terengganu Election Court upheld it in June 2023 and the Federal Court affirmed that decision in November 2023. At the 2023 state elections PAS won 105 of the 127 seats it contested.

== Menteri Besar of Terengganu ==
Hadi became the 11th Menteri Besar of Terengganu at the age of 52, following the general election held on 29 November 1999. PAS held 28 of the 32 seats in the state assembly.

=== Record in office ===
After PAS won the state in 1999 the federal government stopped Terengganu's oil royalty, which the state had expected to be a five per cent share of annual oil and gas production worth around RM250 million, and instead paid the money out as goodwill grants through committees it appointed. The state government sued, and the case was before the High Court in 2002.

=== Syariah Criminal Offences (Hudud and Qisas) Enactment ===
On 8 July 2002 the Terengganu State Legislative Assembly passed a bill introducing hudud criminal penalties, including amputation for theft, death by stoning for adultery and sodomy, death for apostasy, and whipping for the consumption of alcohol. The bill required four male Muslim witnesses to prove a rape, and a complainant who could not meet that standard could be charged with slander. The UMNO members walked out of the chamber as the vote was taken.

Defending the bill in the assembly, Hadi said that although the penalties were "harsh and terrifying", the offences they covered were "truly evil and despicable". The federal government under Prime Minister Mahathir Mohamad undertook to block the enactment, as it had the comparable law passed by Kelantan in 1993. Neither law has been enforced.

== International involvement ==
=== International Union of Muslim Scholars ===
Hadi became a vice-president of the International Union of Muslim Scholars in 2014. His tenure ended in 2018, after he was censured in 2016 for attending a conference in Iran. In 2017 Saudi Arabia, Egypt, the United Arab Emirates and Bahrain designated the union a terrorist organisation. Hadi attributed the listing to diplomatic disputes between states in the region and said he had not been prevented from performing the umrah.

=== Special envoy to the Middle East ===
In 2020 Prime Minister Muhyiddin Yassin appointed Hadi as special envoy to the Middle East, a post carrying ministerial status. On 4 February 2022, during a working visit approved by the prime minister on 28 January, Hadi met representatives of the Taliban in Doha in a meeting facilitated by the Qatari government. Foreign Minister Saifuddin Abdullah said the engagement did not amount to Malaysian recognition of the Taliban administration and was intended to help avert a humanitarian collapse in Afghanistan.

=== Palestine ===
In January 2023 the Hamas political bureau chairman Ismail Haniyeh publicly thanked Hadi for his work on the Palestinian cause, during a visit to the Hamas office in Doha by PAS and PASRelief delegations led by Hadi's eldest son, Muhammad Khalil Abdul Hadi. After the explosion at a Gaza City hospital in October 2023, Hadi blamed "Israel's Zionist regime" and said that "the world's leaders and people must rise in the spirit of jihad to defend Palestine".

== Controversies and issues ==
=== Amanat Hadi ===
The Amanat Hadi is an address Hadi delivered in Kuala Terengganu in 1981, in which he described UMNO as an enemy that had to be opposed. An excerpt of the address circulated among PAS members in which, according to Malay Mail, he called UMNO and Barisan Nasional supporters infidels and called for a jihad against them.

On 19 November 1985 a police force of 576 attempted to arrest the PAS figure Ibrahim Mahmood at his home in Kampung Memali, Baling. Fourteen villagers and four police officers died. Mahathir Mohamad linked the Amanat Hadi to the incident. The PAS central committee member Kamaruzaman Mohamad rejected that account, attributing the deaths to the conduct of the security forces and calling for a royal commission of inquiry.

The address was declared haram in 2002. By September 2021 no record of that ruling could be found in the national fatwa database maintained by Jakim, which did not answer questions about its removal. The PAS deputy president Tuan Ibrahim Tuan Man said that to his knowledge there had never been any fatwa on the speech.

=== Remarks on Christian missionaries ===
Hadi has alleged that Christian missionaries brought their work to Malaysia only after failing in the West, writing that "Christianity is no longer saleable in countries where the education level is high". He said preachers backed down from debates with Muslim counterparts because "they know they would lose", and described this as "transgression in the name of religion". The article appeared in the PAS newspaper Harakah on 18 January 2016.

In December 2020 two Sabahans, Maklin Masiau and Lawrence Jomiji Kinsil, filed a suit in the High Court in Kuala Lumpur asking the court to find that Hadi had breached Section 3 of the Sedition Act through those remarks. They said they had brought the action because the public prosecutor had not charged him in the four years since publication. Hadi applied to have the summons struck out.

=== Remarks on non-Muslims ===
In an opinion piece published on 7 June 2023, Hadi wrote that non-Muslims should be grateful for the citizenship they had been granted in Malaysia and should not challenge the position of Islam or threaten Malay-Muslim leadership. He added that non-Muslims had been given posts in the Cabinet and the government in matters unconnected to religion.

=== Remarks about Joe Biden ===
On 30 January 2021 the former deputy foreign minister Marzuki Yahya criticised Hadi for saying that a new president in the White House was meaningless for the Islamic world because Joe Biden would continue Zionist-influenced policies, and that the only difference between Biden and Donald Trump was Biden's softer approach. Marzuki said the remarks could be read as an attempt to disrupt relations between Malaysia and the United States.

== Writings ==
By 2018, according to the PAS newspaper Harakah Daily, Hadi had published 108 works, grouped into nine categories: PAS policy speeches (16), Islamic creed (13), movement education (4), Quranic exegesis (14), fiqh of the prophetic biography (5), Islamic politics (23), Islamic jurisprudence (6), collected sermons, speeches and papers (15), and miscellaneous works (12). His best-known work is Fiqh al-Harakah dari Sirah Nabawiyah, first published in 1987 by Dewan Pustaka Fajar in Kuala Lumpur, which derives principles for Islamic political movements from the life of Muhammad.

== Personal life ==
Hadi's eldest son is Muhammad Khalil Abdul Hadi, who has led PAS delegations abroad.

=== Health ===
Hadi was admitted to the National Heart Institute on 15 February 2021 and discharged four days later; his son Muhammad Khalil attributed the admission to a heavy schedule and fatigue. Hadi was admitted to hospital on 1 July 2023 for treatment. On 2 July the deputy Menteri Besar of Kelantan and PAS vice-president Mohd Amar Abdullah said Hadi had been moved out of the cardiac care unit to a regular ward after his condition improved. He underwent a further medical procedure on 17 June 2025 which was reported as successful, with visits restricted during his recovery. He was 77 at the time and had been receiving dialysis.

== Election results ==
Parliament of Malaysia
Year	Constituency	Candidate	Votes	Pct	Opponent(s)	Votes	Pct	Ballots cast	Majority	Turnout
1982	P036 Dungun	Abdul Hadi Awang (PAS)	10,172	42.46%	Awang Abdul Jabar (UMNO)	13,447	56.13%	24,789	3,275	79.79%
1982	P036 Dungun	Abdul Hadi Awang (PAS)	10,172	42.46%	Abdul Hamid Embong (PSRM)	337	1.41%	24,789	3,275	79.79%
1986	P034 Marang	Abdul Hadi Awang (PAS)	13,015	48.80%	Abdul Rahman Bakar (UMNO)	13,654	51.20%	27,433	639	82.61%
1990	P034 Marang	Abdul Hadi Awang (PAS)	17,736	49.98%	Abdul Rahman Bakar (UMNO)	17,575	49.53%	36,172	161	84.70%
1990	P034 Marang	Abdul Hadi Awang (PAS)	17,736	49.98%	Wan Deraman Wan Nik (IND)	176	0.50%	36,172	161	84.70%
1995	P037 Marang	Abdul Hadi Awang (PAS)	21,945	51.03%	Abdul Rahman Bakar (UMNO)	21,063	48.97%	44,212	882	81.69%
1999	P037 Marang	Abdul Hadi Awang (PAS)	30,183	63.18%	Muda Mamat (UMNO)	17,483	36.60%	48,611	12,700	83.05%
2004	P037 Marang	Abdul Hadi Awang (PAS)	27,913	49.56%	Abdul Rahman Bakar (UMNO)	28,076	49.85%	57,186	163	88.84%
2008	P037 Marang	Abdul Hadi Awang (PAS)	33,435	52.08%	Ahmad Ramzi Mohamad Zubir (UMNO)	30,688	47.80%	65,008	2,747	86.89%
2013	P037 Marang	Abdul Hadi Awang (PAS)	42,984	53.04%	Yahya Khatib Mohamad (UMNO)	37,860	46.72%	81,836	5,124	90.13%
2018	P037 Marang	Abdul Hadi Awang (PAS)	53,749	59.27%	Mohamad Nor Endut (UMNO)	31,795	35.06%	92,046	21,954	87.75%
2018	P037 Marang	Abdul Hadi Awang (PAS)	53,749	59.27%	Zarawi Sulong (AMANAH)	5,138	5.67%	92,046	21,954	87.75%
2022	P037 Marang	Abdul Hadi Awang (PAS)	73,115	67.04%	Jasmira Othman (UMNO)	31,386	28.78%	110,312	41,729	82.78%
2022	P037 Marang	Abdul Hadi Awang (PAS)	73,115	67.04%	Azhar Abdul Shukur (AMANAH)	4,140	3.80%	110,312	41,729	82.78%
2022	P037 Marang	Abdul Hadi Awang (PAS)	73,115	67.04%	Zarawi Sulong (PUTRA)	427	0.39%	110,312	41,729	82.78%

Terengganu State Legislative Assembly
Year	Constituency	Candidate	Votes	Pct	Opponent(s)	Votes	Pct	Ballots cast	Majority	Turnout
1978	N21 Marang	Abdul Hadi Awang (PAS)	2,618	49.36%	Tengku Zahid Musa (UMNO)	2,686	50.64%	7,142	68	
1982	N21 Marang	Abdul Hadi Awang (PAS)	3,606	50.94%	Tengku Zahid Musa (UMNO)	3,473	49.06%	7,251	133	85.33%
1986	N19 Ru Rendang	Abdul Hadi Awang (PAS)	3,470	54.14%	Abdul Latif Muda (UMNO)	2,939	45.86%	6,567	531	82.68%
1990	N19 Ru Rendang	Abdul Hadi Awang (PAS)	4,750	54.93%	Abdul Latif Muda (UMNO)	3,897	45.07%	8,799	853	83.54%
1995	N19 Ru Rendang	Abdul Hadi Awang (PAS)	6,285	56.24%	Abu Bakar Othman (UMNO)	4,891	43.76%	11,348	1,394	80.73%
1999	N19 Ru Rendang	Abdul Hadi Awang (PAS)	7,881	66.02%	Tengku Zainuddin Tengku Zahid (UMNO)	4,038	33.83%	12,125	3,843	81.37%
2004	N19 Ru Rendang	Abdul Hadi Awang (PAS)	7,736	54.06%	Tengku Zainuddin Tengku Zahid (UMNO)	6,301	44.04%	14,446	1,435	89.38%
2008	N19 Ru Rendang	Abdul Hadi Awang (PAS)	9,379	58.36%	Razali Idris (UMNO)	6,693	41.64%	16,209	2,686	86.23%
2013	N19 Ru Rendang	Abdul Hadi Awang (PAS)	11,468	56.83%	Nik Dir Nik Wan Ku (UMNO)	8,649	42.86%	20,347	2,819	89.78%

== International recognition ==
Abdul Hadi Awang has been listed as one of the world's 500 most influential Muslims by The Royal Islamic Strategic Studies Centre based in Amman, Jordan. He was given this recognition in the category of Preachers & Spiritual Guides The Muslim 500: The World's 500 Most Influential Muslims 2016 edition.

== Honours ==
=== Honours of Malaysia ===
- Malaysia
  - Commander of the Order of Loyalty to the Crown of Malaysia (PSM) – Tan Sri (2021)
  - Recipient of the 17th Yang di-Pertuan Agong Installation Medal (2024)
- Terengganu
  - Knight Grand Companion of the Order of Sultan Mahmud I of Terengganu (SSMT) – Dato' Seri (2001)

== See also ==
- Masjid Kampung Rusila

== Bibliography ==
- Farish Ahmad Noor, Islam Embedded: The Historical Development of the Democratic Action Party DAP, 1951–2003, Malaysian Sociological Research Institute, 2004, ISBN 983-99866-8-6
- Haddad, Yvonne Yazbeck, Voll, John Obert, Esposito, John L., The Contemporary Islamic Revival: A Critical Survey and Bibliography, Greenwood Publishing Group, 1991, ISBN 0-313-24719-6
- Hooker, Virginia Matheson, Othman, Norani, Kessler, Clive S., Malaysia: Islam, Society and Politics, Institute of Southeast Asian Studies, 2003, ISBN 981-230-161-5
- Saw, Swee-Hock, K. Kesavapany, Malaysia: Recent Trends and Challenges, Institute of Southeast Asian Studies, 2006, ISBN 981-230-339-1

Political offices
Preceded by Fadzil Noor	Leader of the Opposition of Malaysia; 2002–2004	Succeeded by Lim Kit Siang
Preceded by Wan Mokhtar Ahmad	Menteri Besar of Terengganu; 1999–2004	Succeeded by Idris Jusoh
Party political offices
Preceded by Fadzil Noor	President of the Malaysian Islamic Party; 2002–present	Incumbent
Parliament of Malaysia
Preceded by Abdul Rahman Bakar	Member of Parliament for Marang; 2008–present	Incumbent
New constituency	Member of Terengganu State Legislative Assembly for Ru Rendang; 1986–2018	Succeeded by Ahmad Samsuri Mokhtar
Preceded by Tengku Zahid Musa	Member of Terengganu State Legislative Assembly for Marang; 1982–1986	Constituency abolished
