= SMK Datuk Awang Jabar =

Datuk Awang Jabar Secondary School (SMKDAJ) is a secondary school located in Kampung Jambu, Marang, Terengganu, Malaysia.

The school was originally named Jambu Bongkok Secondary School since its inception in 2006 in conjunction with the school located at Kampung Jambu Bongkok.

It was subsequently renamed as Datuk Awang Jabar Secondary School, after the elected representative and member of parliament, Datuk Awang Jabar, from Kampung Merchang, with approval from the Ministry of Education on 20 May 2015.

Datuk Awang Jabar Secondary School is located approximately 58 miles from Kuala Terengganu and 24 kilometers from the town of Dungun.
