= Kapas Island =

Island in Malaysia

Native name: Pulau Kapas ڤولاو كاڤس Pula Kapah
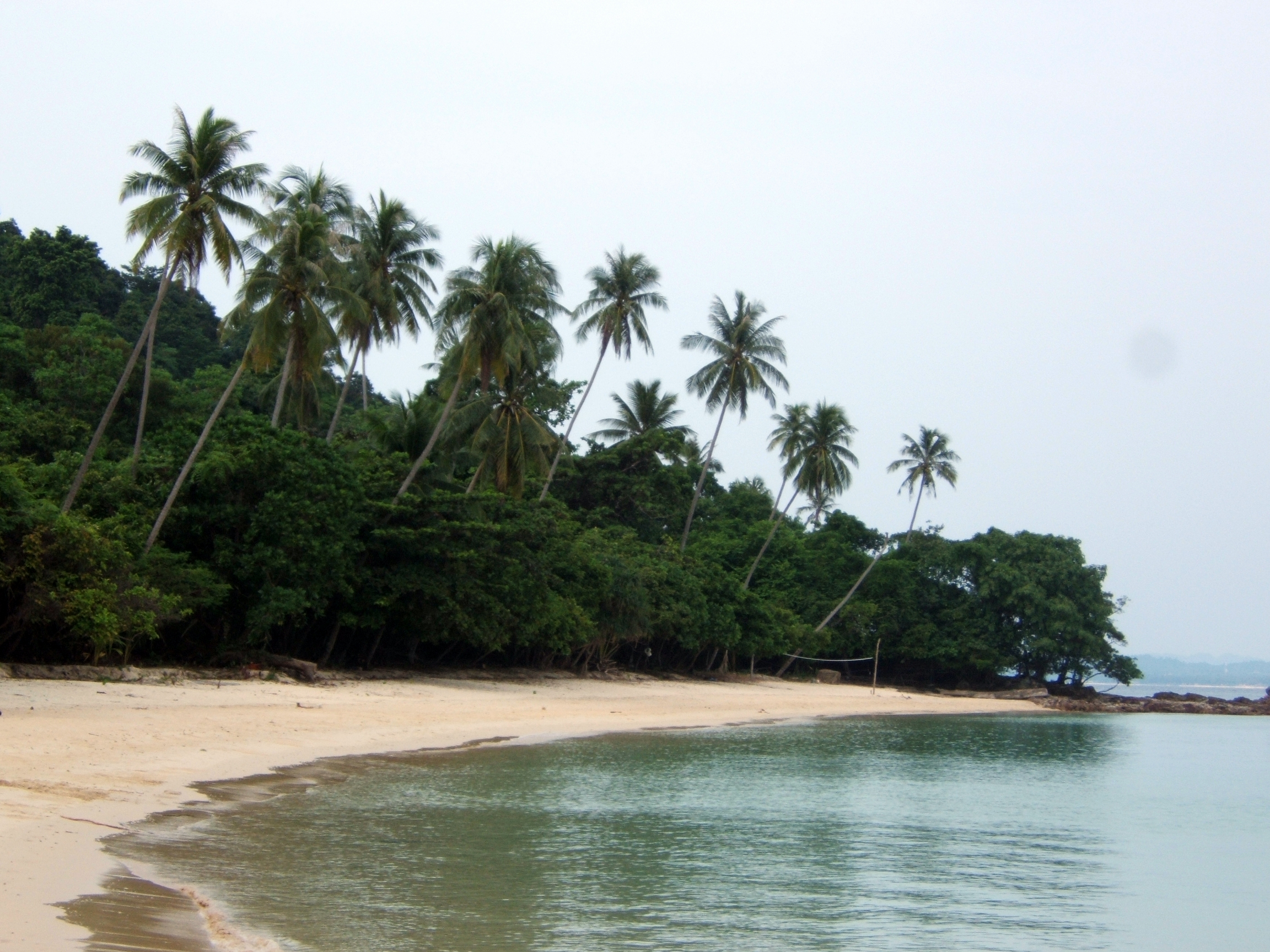
- Landscape of Kapas Island
- Interactive map of Kapas Island

Geography
- Location: South China Sea
- Coordinates: 5°13′08″N 103°15′55″E
- Archipelago: Kapas and Gemia
- Area: 1.5 km^{2} (0.58 sq mi)

Administration
- Malaysia
- State: Terengganu
- District: Marang
- Mukim: Rusila

Additional information
- Time zone: MST (UTC+8)
- Postal code: 21600

Kapas Island (Malay: Pulau Kapas, Terengganuan: Pula Kapah) is an island in Marang District, Terengganu, Malaysia, with a smaller island, Gemia Island, located north of it. It measures roughly 1.5 by 2.5 km (0.93 by 1.55 mi). Its name, Pulau Kapas (Malay for the cotton island), refers to the island's white beaches. The island has a tropical jungle, clear seawater, white sand beaches and coral reefs in the surrounding waters. It is promoted as a "diving and snorkeling paradise". The island is reached by ferry from Marang. Kapas is the location where most of the research on the enigmatic Amphidromus snails is carried out (unlike all other snails, Amphidromus are amphidromine: they usually exist of clockwise and anticlockwise individuals).

Unlike most other islands that are protected and gazetted as marine parks by the Department of Fisheries, Kapas Island is zoned 1 nautical mile (1.9 km) from the shore at lowest tide.

== Archipelago ==
Island	Area (km^{2})
Kapas	1.501
Gemia	0.073
Total	1.574

== See also ==
- List of islands of Malaysia
- List of islands in the South China Sea
