= Kampung Jenang =

Coordinates: 5°08′N 103°12′E

- Village
- Interactive map of Kampung Jenang
- Country: Malaysia
- State: Terengganu
- District: Marang

Kampung Jenang is a small traditional village in Marang District, Terengganu, Malaysia.

There is a river that separating Kampung Jenang with nearby villages, Kampung Batangan, Kampung Batu Putih, Kampung Gong Beris and few more villages. Kampung Jenang is well known for its traditional activities such as Atap Nipah, Crabs and Prawns Catching, and many more.

In 2008, gold was discovered in the village, creating a windfall for the residents.
