= Laderman =

Laderman may refer to:

- Carol Laderman (1932–2010), American anthropologist
- Ezra Laderman (1924–2015), American composer of classical music
- Fred "Ladd" Laderman (1927–2021), American television and film writer and producer
- Gabriel Laderman (1929–2011), American figurative painter
- Mierle Laderman Ukeles (born 1939), American artist known for her feminist and service-oriented work
