= Carol Laderman =

Carol Laderman (October 25, 1932 – July 6, 2010) was a groundbreaking medical anthropologist, specializing in the study of pregnancy and childbirth practices, shamanism, and Southeast Asian cultures, particularly Malays in rural Terengganu, Malaysia. She was also a critically acclaimed writer and a longtime professor and lecturer who had just been re-elevated to the Chairmanship of the Department of Anthropology at City College at the time of her death.

== Birth, early family life and education ==
Carol was born and grew up in the Crown Heights section of Brooklyn with her father, Philip Ciavati (ne Cohen), mother, Sylvia (née Sugarman) and her older sister, Irma Cavat, who was later a painter and Professor of Art at UC Santa Barbara. She was musically talented, and studied piano with Irma Wolpe and music theory and counterpoint with Stefan Wolpe. A fellow student of Stefan Wolpe, the composer Ezra Laderman, had a younger brother named Gabriel, who would eventually become Carol's husband. Shortly after she got married at the age of 20, Gabriel was drafted into the US Army, and Carol interrupted her education as a music major at Brooklyn College to join her husband near Fort Leonard Wood after he had completed basic training.

Subsequently, Carol helped support Gabriel and her son, Raphael (b. 1958) by working as a legal secretary, social secretary and translator.

== Return to college and new focus on anthropology ==
In 1969, Carol decided to go back to college, called the admissions office at Hunter College - like Brooklyn, part of the CUNY system - and reactivated her matriculation. She initially maintained her status as a music major, but when she took an anthropology course with Rena Gropper to fulfill a distributional requirement, she was so captivated that she changed her major. While she was still an undergraduate at Hunter, she did research under the auspices of Mt. Sinai Hospital on the attitudes young Latina mothers in Spanish Harlem and the South Bronx had toward the American health care system they were exposed to, and was thereby introduced to the humoral system as a fundamental aspect of a living belief system, rather than as just an ancient theory of Galen and others. This experience would prove to be important to her future research in Malaysia. She explained the practical applications of the humoral system as applied to foods in a New York Times article, for which she was interviewed:

"Scotch on the rocks[...]would be considered very hot, while squash, even taken boiling from the stove, would be cold."

Ms. Laderman graduated from Hunter College with honors in 1972 and was shortly thereafter awarded a Danforth Foundation fellowship, which enabled her to do graduate work at Columbia University. While she was a masters-level student at Columbia, she wrote "Malaria and progress: Some historical and ecological considerations" - which is still a much-cited article today.

== Malaysia ==
In 1975, Ms. Laderman, her husband and her younger son, Michael (b. 1965), went to Malaysia, where she would do doctoral research for the following two years in the coastal village of Merchang, Terengganu, on the East Coast of the Malay Peninsula. She was apprenticed to a locally-famous bomoh and a traditional village midwife. The doctoral dissertation that resulted from her research, "Conceptions and Preconceptions: Childbirth and Nutrition in Rural Malaysia" - for which she received a Ph.D. with distinction - and the subsequent book, "Wives and Midwives: Childbirth and Nutrition in Rural Malaysia, helped correct many assumptions previously made by anthropologists and other writers about Malay culture. For example, through rigorous dietary analysis and blood testing, she was able to demonstrate that traditional dietary restrictions practiced by some Malay women during pregnancy and for 40 days after childbirth were not causing malnutrition, as had previously been claimed.

It is difficult to overstate the degree to which her methodical work upended previous conventional wisdom about Malay culture among the anthropological community. To take just one example, on p. 185 of "Wives and Midwives," Laderman states that previous authorities "agree[d]...that fluids are restricted during the postpartum period," yet of 131 women she questioned about nursing their babies, 103 had nursed without bottle supplements for at least one year. She explains that previous researchers had erred by misunderstanding a prohibition on drinking cold water (primarily due to humoral considerations of cold water being possibly dangerously humorally "cooling" to the baby) as constituting a limitation on overall fluid intake, and also by overrelying on "sayur" as "the [generic] word for vegetables in standard Malay," as opposed to the specific local meaning of "vegetables [cooked] with coconut cream, chilis, and fish." Asking Malays from Terengganu and Kelantan how much "sayur" they eat would have produced misleading answers, if the questioner was trying to discover how often they ate vegetables in any form.

A subsequent book, "Taming the Wind of Desire: Psychology, Medicine and Aesthetics in Malay Shamanistic Performance," includes the first complete - and copiously annotated - translations of entire Main Peteri healing ceremonies, and constitutes the first instance of anthropological research which demonstrates the existence of a non-Western system of nonprojective psychotherapy. Within the book are explanations of the traditional Malay archetypes of personality called "angin" (="winds"), which Laderman analogizes to Jungian archetypes. In a monograph of the Federation Museums Journal of Malaysia, the original texts, in dialect/ritual Malay, were published.

Laderman returned to Malaysia to do further research in 1982 and 2003.

== Academic career ==
Dr. Laderman had a long career as a professor, lecturer, editor, and reviewer, as well as a writer. Among the institutions she was associated with were Yale University, Hunter College, and Brooklyn College, but most of all, Fordham University and City College. Among her many honors and awards was a stint as a Resident Scholar of the Rockefeller Foundation's center in Bellagio, Italy and a Guggenheim Fellowship. Her archive is preserved at the Smithsonian Institution.
