= Abdul Rahman Bakar =

Malaysian politician

Yang Berbahagia Dato' Sri Abdul Rahman Bakar SSAP DPMT DMSM
- عبدالرحمن بن بكر

Deputy Minister of Human Resources
- In office 27 March 2004 – 18 March 2008
- Monarchs: Sirajuddin; Mizan Zainal Abidin
- Prime Minister: Abdullah Ahmad Badawi
- Minister: Fong Chan Onn
- Preceded by: Abdul Latiff Ahmad
- Succeeded by: Noraini Ahmad
- Constituency: Marang

Senator (At-large)
- In office 15 July 2008 – 17 July 2014
- Monarchs: Mizan Zainal Abidin; Abdul Halim
- Prime Minister: Abdullah Ahmad Badawi; Najib Razak

Member of the Malaysian Parliament for Marang
- In office 2004–2008
- Preceded by: Abdul Hadi Awang (PAS)
- Succeeded by: Abdul Hadi Awang (PAS)
- In office 1986–1990
- Preceded by: Constituency created
- Succeeded by: Abdul Hadi Awang (PAS)

Personal details
- Born: 30 May 1952 (age 74) Kampung Gelugor Kedai, Kuala Terengganu, Terengganu
- Citizenship: Malaysian
- Party: United Malays National Organisation (UMNO)
- Other political affiliations: Barisan Nasional (BN); Muafakat Nasional (MN)
- Spouse: Datin Sri Robiah Hitam
- Children: 6
- Education: Universiti Kebangsaan Malaysia
- Occupation: Politician

Abdul Rahman bin Bakar is a Malaysian politician, a former Member of Parliament (MP) and a former Deputy Minister of Human Resources. He is famously known as the 'giant-killer' in Malaysian politics, due to his record of defeating top prominent politician of PAS, Abdul Hadi Awang, twice during the general elections.

== Election results ==
Parliament of Malaysia
Year	Constituency	Candidate	Votes	Pct	Opponent(s)	Votes	Pct	Ballots cast	Majority	Turnout
1986	P034 Marang	Abdul Rahman Bakar (UMNO)	13,654	51.20%	Abdul Hadi Awang (PAS)	13,015	48.80%	27,433	639	82.61%
1990	P034 Marang	Abdul Rahman Bakar (UMNO)	17,575	49.53%	Abdul Hadi Awang (PAS)	17,736	49.98%	36,172	161	84.70%
1990	P034 Marang	Abdul Rahman Bakar (UMNO)	17,575	49.53%	Wan Deraman Wan Nik (IND)	176	0.50%	36,172	161	84.70%
1995	P037 Marang	Abdul Rahman Bakar (UMNO)	21,063	48.97%	Abdul Hadi Awang (PAS)	21,945	51.03%	44,212	882	81.69%
2004	P037 Marang	Abdul Rahman Bakar (UMNO)	28,076	49.85%	Abdul Hadi Awang (PAS)	27,913	49.56%	57,186	163	88.84%

== Honours ==
- Malacca
  - Companion Class I of the Exalted Order of Malacca (DMSM) – Datuk (2004)
- Pahang
  - Knight Grand Companion of the Order of Sultan Ahmad Shah of Pahang (SSAP) – Dato' Sri (2014)
- Terengganu
  - Knight Commander of the Order of the Crown of Terengganu (DPMT) – Dato' (2006)
