= Patricia Chidlaw =

American artist

- Born: 1951 (age 74–75); San Francisco, CA
- Education: University of California, Santa Barbara
- Website: patriciachidlaw.com

Patricia Chidlaw is a Santa Barbara artist known for her realist paintings of urban landscapes. She was an early member of the Oak Group, founded by Ray Strong.

== Early life and education ==
Patricia Chidlaw was born in San Francisco, California in 1951. As a child she lived in Germany, France, Italy and The Netherlands following her father to various Army posts. While studying art at UCSB, she was a student of Irma Cavat.

== Career ==
People are rarely featured in Chidlaw's work, and instead her paintings depict overlooked scenes, using long light to alter the mundane, such as swimming pools, piers, restaurants, empty streets, theaters, trains, trailer parks, laundromats, and stations.

Chidlaw's painting of the Santa Barbara Arlington Theater was used as the official poster for the 2023 Santa Barbara International Film Festival.

In 2018, a group of Santa Barbara poets released a book of poems, "Elsewhere, Paradise", inspired by Chidlaw's Paintings.

In 2014, Chidlaw's work was the subject of a solo exhibition at the Nevada Museum of Art.

Chidlaw participated in a 2014 group show at the Santa Barbara Museum of Natural History, and in a 2002 show at the Ventura County Museum of History and Art.

Chidlaw's paintings are included in the permanent collections of The Hilbert Museum of California Art at Chapman College, and the Museum of Ventura County.

Chidlaw is included in Mark Robert Halper's 2013 photography book "Between Seer and Seen: Celebrating the Artists of Santa Barbara County".

== Personal life ==
Patricia lives in Santa Barbara. She and her husband have restored a 1912 Craftsman Bungalow, as well as a 1925 Norman Revival Cottage. Chidlaw performed as a belly dancer for 10 years, and is one of the founders of annual Santa Barbara Halloween Witches and Warlocks Gathering Luncheon.
