= Tal Avitzur =

Found object sculptor

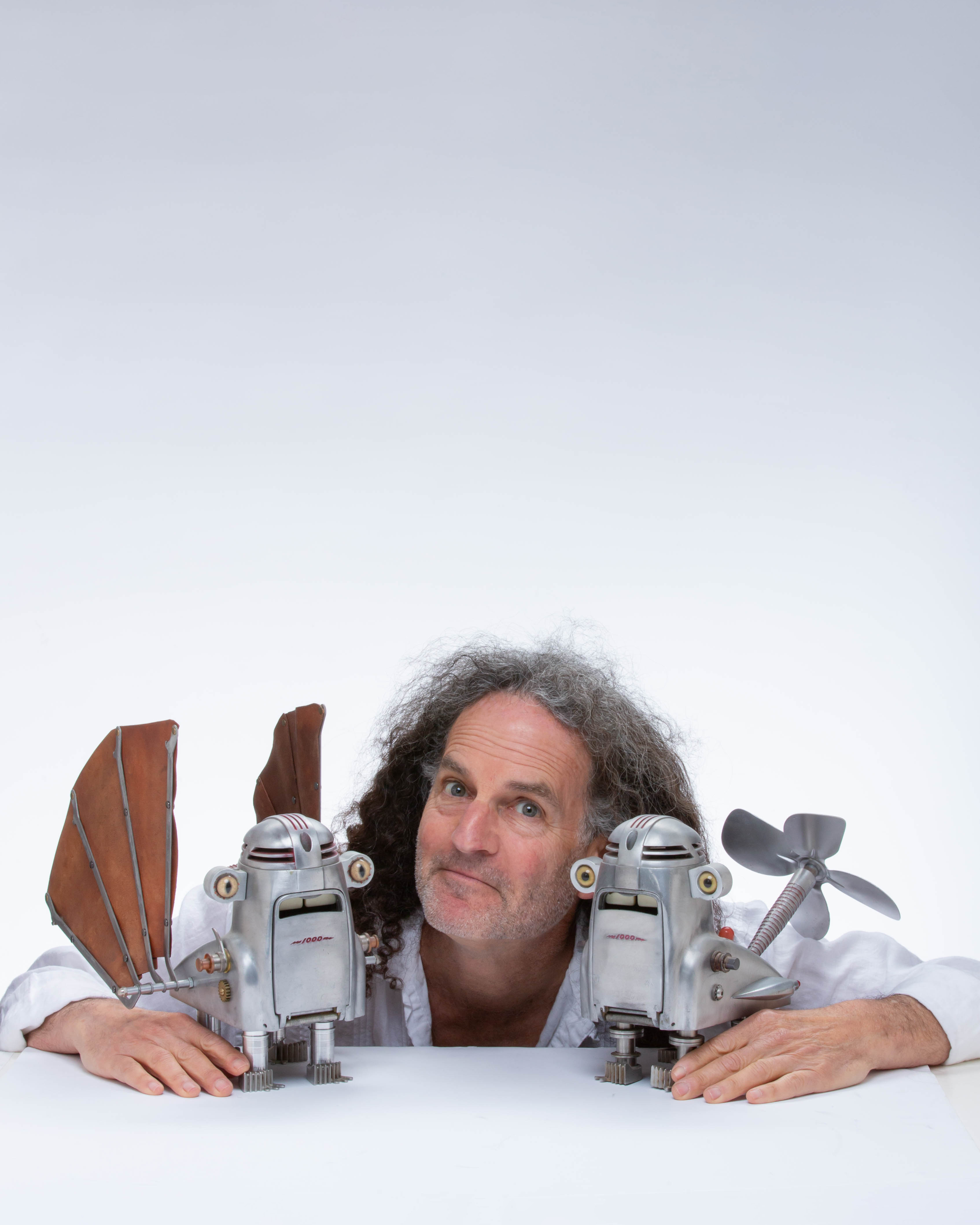
- Born: 1962 (age 63–64)
- Education: Lehigh University, UC Santa Barbara
- Known for: Sculpture
- Website: https://talbotics.com/

Tal Avitzur is a found-object sculptor known for creating assemblage robots, creatures, spaceships and other fantasy-themed sculptures.

== Early life and education ==
Avitzur was born in 1962 in Haifa, Israel. He was raised in Allentown, PA. His father was a professor of metallurgy at Lehigh University. Avitzur received his B.A. in mathematics from Lehigh University in 1983 and his M.A. in mathematics from University of California, Santa Barbara in 1985.

== Career ==
While studying for his master's degree Avitzur lived in the Santa Barbara home of painter Irma Cavat and was her studio assistant. Cavat's home was also the winter studio for sculptor George Rickey. Avitzur worked for Rickey as well, both in Santa Barbara and East Chatham, NY. Avitzur also worked for ceramacist Beatrice Wood in Ojai, CA until her death in 1998. Avitzur credits his father's research with metals and his employment with various artists for his decision to become an artist. Avitzur's sculpture teacher was kinetic sculptor Ken Bortolazzo.

Avitzur gathers materials for his sculptures from auto and marine salvage yards, scrap metal yards, garage and estate sales and flea markets. He disassembles, cleans, polishes and sorts the parts.

Avitzur's sculptures have been displayed at the Santa Barbara Museum of Natural History, Westmont College, Sullivan Goss Gallery, Santa Barbara Community Arts Workshop, La Luz de Jesus Gallery, and the Bay Area Maker Faire Applied Kinetic Arts Group Gallery Space.

Avitzur was included in Between Seer and Seen, a photo book of Santa Barbara County artists, released in 2013 by Mark Robert Halper.

Avitzur participated in a video and advertising campaign for financial and retirement services company Athene in 2021.

In 2023 Avitzur organized the first Santa Barbara Uptown Artists Open Studio Tour.

== Personal life ==
Avitzur lives with his wife, Lisa, in Santa Barbara, CA and occasionally teaches mathematics at Santa Barbara City College. His home, workshop and gallery are run on solar power and he drives an electric car.
