= Gong Balai =

Malaysian fishing village

Coordinates: 5°01′N 103°19′E

Gong Balai is a small fishing village in Terengganu, Malaysia. It is in an area of beaches that is occasionally visited by turtles.

The voting district Gong Balai had 1486 voters in 2018.
