= Harakah (newspaper) =

Malaysian newspaper owned by Malaysian Islamic Party

Harakah الحركه
- Type: Weekly newspaper
- Format: Tabloid
- Owner(s): Malaysian Islamic Party
- Founded: March 1987
- Language: Malay
- Headquarters: 28 Jalan Pahang Barat, off Jalan Pahang, 53000 Kuala Lumpur
- OCLC number: 233144421
- Website: harakahdaily.net

Harakah (Arabic: الحركه, lit. 'Motion') is a newspaper founded in 1987 and published by Malaysian Islamic Party (PAS). In addition to using the Malay language, the paper includes an 8-page English language pullout consisting of pages and columns written in English called the English Section. A page in Jawi writing was introduced in 2007. Articles from Harakah are also available through its own website, Harakahdaily.net.

== Overview ==
Harakah's current Managing Director is Khairil Nizam Khirudin. Currently helmed by Wan Nordin Wan Yaakob who was appointed its editor-in-chief in 2015, its former editor-in-chiefs include Zulkifli Sulong, Suhaimi Taib and Ahmad Lutfi Othman. Its internet wing edition, Harakahdaily.net, is headed by Mohd Rashidi Hassan. One of the better known contributors to Harakah was M. G. G. Pillai, who coined the term "Darul Casino". He died in 2006.

== History ==
Harakah began as a weekly in March 1987 with 15,000 copies. By September 1998, it was "bi-weekly" and had a circulation of 75,000 copies. In December 1998, it had a "claimed" circulation of 340,000 copies.

In January 2000, it had a circulation of 368,000 copies but was planned to be reduced to 100,000 for two months to comply with "the Home Ministry's ruling on its distribution".

During the 52nd PAS Youth Muktamar which was held in November 2012, Nasrudin Hassan of PAS Youth demanded that the editorial line-up of the newspaper should be restructured and wants a committee to be set up to censor the editorial content of the newspaper and its online portal Harakahdaily. PAS Youth claims that the newspaper has lost its credibility and derailed from its own purpose. Nasrudin claims that it no longer carries the aspiration of the jamaah to propel the Islamic movement of the 21st century. PAS later accepted the resolution without debate.

== Controversy ==
On 16 June 2003, Harakah insulting Prime Minister Mahathir Mohamad by depicting him with a pig-like snout in one of their cartoons. Government MPs protested Harakah for insulting Mahathir. On 18 June, Harakah editor Zulkifli Sulong has apologised over the controversial cartoon published. Mahathir said the Government would not take action against Harakah.
