= Rusila =

Kampong in Malaysia

Rusila (Jawi: روسيلا) is a village in Marang District, Terengganu, Malaysia.

== History ==
The settlement was believed to be founded by immigrants from Patani Kingdom, in present-day southern Thailand, during the 19th century.

== Mosque ==
Rusila is famous as an Islamic learning centre for ordinary people in Terengganu. The main mosque here, known as Masjid Rusila, is notable for being the home mosque of PAS President Abdul Hadi Awang, who is Member of Parliament of Marang since 1990. There is an old concept of 'Menadah Kitab' which means the people who want to learn Islam will go to the place where there is an Islamic religious teacher to learn different aspect of Islam.
