= Merchang =

Coordinates: 5°02′N 103°18′E

Merchang (Jawi: مرچڠ) (est. pop. (2015 census): 8,248) is a town in a sub-district (Malay: mukim) of the same name in Marang District, Terengganu, Malaysia. Fishery (including oyster cultivation) and agriculture are the main economic activities.

Merchang was considered a district from 13 districts of Terengganu. This was divided by Sultan Abidin II who ruled from the year 1881 until 1919. Sultan Abidin II already appointed Tengku Long when he at around Singapore for guarding Merchang district. Meanwhile he deputed to 2 wives which is Tengku Long and Tengku Safiah. The main yield of Merchang at that time was entrepreneur of "belacan" and dried fish that would sending to Singapore.
