= Marang District =

- District of Terengganu
- Daerah Marang
- Flag Seal
- Interactive map of Marang District
- Location of Marang District in Malaysia
- Coordinates: 5°10′N 103°10′E
- Country: Malaysia
- State: Terengganu
- Granted Municipality status: 2021 (Postpone)
- Seat: Marang
- Local area government(s): Marang District Council

Government
  - District officer: Tun Ahmad Faisal bin Tun Abdul Razak

Area
  - Total: 666.54 km^{2} (257.35 sq mi)

Population (2010)
  - Total: 97,857
  - Estimate (2014): 102,500
  - Density: 146.81/km^{2} (380.24/sq mi)
- Time zone: UTC+8 (MST)
  - Summer (DST): UTC+8 (Not observed)
- Postcode: 21xxx
- Calling code: +6-09-6
- Vehicle registration plates: T

The Marang District is a coastal district in Terengganu, Malaysia facing the South China Sea.The district seat is the town of Marang. The districts that border Marang are Kuala Terengganu and Kuala Nerus to the north, Hulu Terengganu in the west, while Dungun is in the south. The eastern part of the district is a stretch of coastline facing the South China Sea.

== Etymology ==
The origin of the district's name is attributed to a Chinese entrepreneur of dried sea products known only by the name of Ma (馬, literally horses), who was one of the first settlers in the area. The sea products, consisting of fish and squid, are dried on racks called rang by the local populace. Given Ma owned all the rangs, the area became known as Ma rang (i.e. 'Ma's rangs'), which eventually became Marang.

== History ==
The administrative history of Marang began in the reign of Baginda Omar (r. 1839–1876), the ninth Sultan of Terengganu, with the appointment of noblemen governing riverine districts, whereby the governing noble would administer the collection of taxes and revenue on behalf of the Sultan. Previously, the power to collect taxes was in the hands of village heads; they were now only responsible for village-level administration. The new system greatly improved tax and revenue collection and increased local administration efficiency. Present-day Marang district was divided into four riverine districts, Marang, Bukit Payong, Alor Limbat and Merchang.

In 1912, the nobility-based district administration was replaced by professional District Officers. The Marang District Office Building was erected in Marang town in 1915. However, in 1923, during the reign of Sultan Sulaiman Badrul Alam Shah (r. 1920–1942), the British Adviser, J.L. Humpherys, led a reorganization of district-level administration. The riverine districts were abolished and replaced with three dependencies (Malay: jajahan). The Marang and Merchang riverine districts were lumped with Kuala Berang and Kuala Terengganu into a new Central Dependency. Each dependency was headed by a Commissioner and assisted by an Assistant British Adviser.

== Geography and demographics ==
Marang has an area of 666 km^{2}. The district's topography consists of the South China Sea coast, peat swamps, hills and plains. The sub-districts (Malay: mukim) of Rusila, Pulau Kerengga and Merchang lie on the coast with sandy plains gradually giving way to hills in the interior. The Jerong sub-district is mainly hilly, while the sub-districts of Bukit Payong and Alor Limbat consist of rolling plains and peat swamps. The district's population of 84,938 (2000 census) is 97.2% rural and predominantly Malays (97.2%) while the Chinese are the biggest ethnic minority (2.6%). Most people in Marang use the Marang sub-dialect of Terengganu Malay.

Historical population
| Year | Pop. | ±% |
|---|---|---|
| 1991 | 69,637 | — |
| 2000 | 83,284 | +19.6% |
| 2010 | 95,283 | +14.4% |
| 2020 | 116,605 | +22.4% |

== Administrative divisions ==

Marang District is divided into 9 mukims, which are:

- Jerung
- Mercang
- Pulau Kerengga
- Rusila
- Alur Limbat
- Bukit Payong
- Bandar Marang
- Bukit Payong
- Pengkalan Berangan

== Federal Parliament and State Assembly Seats ==
List of Marang district representatives in the Federal Parliament (Dewan Rakyat)

| No. | Federal Constituency | Member | Coalition (Party) |
|---|---|---|---|
| P037 | Marang | Abdul Hadi Awang | PN (PAS) |

List of Marang district representatives in the State Legislative Assembly of Terengganu

| No. | State Constituency | Member | Coalition (Party) |
|---|---|---|---|
| N17 | Alur Limbat | Ariffin Deraman | PN (PAS) |
| N18 | Bukit Payung | Mohd. Nor Hamzah | PN (PAS) |
| N19 | Ru Rendang | Ahmad Samsuri Mokhtar | PN (PAS) |
| N20 | Pengkalan Berangan | Sulaiman Sulong | PN (PAS) |

== Tourist attractions ==
Among the main attractions in Marang district include:

- Kelulut Beach
- Marang River cruise
- Jambu Bongkok Forest Reserve
- Pulau Kapas (via passenger boats from Marang town)

== Transportation ==
Marang town is about 16 km from the state capital Kuala Terengganu, using highway 3 which is the main route running through the constituency. Highway 14 runs through the western flank of Marang constituency and is an alternative route to Kuala Terengganu, as well as Kuala Berang.

== See also ==
- Districts of Malaysia
- Gong Balai
