= Irma Cavat =

American visual artist (born 1925)

- Born: 1925; Brooklyn, New York, U.S.
- Died: February 16, 2020 (aged 94–95); Santa Barbara, California, U.S.
- Employer: University of California, Santa Barbara
- Style: Surrealism, Modernism
- Movement: Abstract expressionism
- Spouse: Zubel Kachadoorian
- Children: 2

Irma Cavat (1925 – February 16, 2020) was an American visual artist. She was associated with the Abstract Expressionists but painted and worked primarily in a surreal and modernist style. From 1965 to 2000, Cavat was an Assistant Professor of Art at the University of California, Santa Barbara, where she lived until her death.

== Early life and education ==
Irma Cavat was born in Brooklyn, New York, in 1925. She became a professional artist in her early 20s. She was the older sister of medical anthropologist Carol Laderman. She took courses in drawing, sculpture, art history and painting at Académie de la Grande Chaumière, New York University, The New School for Social Research, the Brooklyn Museum Art School and the Academy of Allied Arts. She also studied independently with sculptors Jose De Creeft and Alexander Archipenko, and painter Hans Hofmann. She lived in Rome, Italy, from 1955 to 1964, where she received a grant from the Fulbright Program, married painter Zubel Kachadoorian and gave birth to daughters Nika and Karina.

== Career and work ==
As a young artist, Cavat modeled for surrealist artist Rene Magritte and became part of the Abstract Expressionist group, befriending Elaine and Willem de Kooning, Jackson Pollock, and Larry Rivers. Over her career, she worked across media, including paint, clay, metal, marble, jewelry and collage. She was also commissioned to paint murals in Haiti, Greece, and the United States.

In 1995, in collaboration with landscape architect Isabelle Greene and Nobel laureate Walter Kohn, Cavat helped create the Nuclear Age Peace Foundation's Sadako Peace Garden on the 50th anniversary of the Hiroshima tragedy. Noted kinetic sculptor George Rickey spent many winters with his family in a studio on Cavat's property in Santa Barbara. Sculptor Tal Avitzur credits Cavat with inspiring him to start down his own artistic path.

Cavat was awarded residencies at Yaddo in New York, the McDowell Colony in Maine and the Djerassi Foundation in Northern California. She was exhibited widely in the United States and Italy, and her works are in the permanent collection at the Art, Design and Architecture Museum of the University of California, Santa Barbara, Wayne State University, and in various private collections. She was exhibited at New York City's Museum of Modern Art in 1956 and was reviewed in Artforum, American Riviera Media, Los Angeles Times, New York Herald Tribune and elsewhere. A review of her 1966 exhibition at the Phoenix Art Museum offered praise for her use of color and noted her works incorporating cloth and newsprint. A retrospective of her work was held at Legacy Art Santa Barbara in July 2024.

Cavat died on February 16, 2020, in Santa Barbara.
