= Malaysia–United States Free Trade Agreement =

The Malaysia-US Free Trade Agreement is a proposed treaty between Malaysia and the United States of America. The treaty aims to liberalise each other markets to parties of the agreement and directly encourage trade between the two countries. At the time of proposal in 2005, the US was Malaysia's largest trading partner while Malaysia is the 10th largest trading partner for the US. Negotiation began in June 2005.

The Malaysian delegation was led by then Minister of International Trade and Industry, Rafidah Abdul Aziz and the US delegation was led by United States Trade Representative Rob Portman and his deputy, Ambassador Karan K. Bhatia.

== History ==
In January 2009, International Trade and Industry Minister Muhyiddin Yassin announced that negotiations on a free trade agreement had been temporarily suspended as a protest against the American support of Israel in the 2008 Gaza War. At the time of his statement he had not yet officially informed the Cabinet of his decision to suspend negotiations.

The negotiations have since stalled as the US instead prioritized a regional economic association, particularly the Trans-Pacific Partnership.

== Issues ==
Several rounds were held to discuss matters that proved to be sticky for both sides. The US was working to achieve an agreement before the Trade Promotion Authority lapsed in July 2007; the TPA is an authority granted by the US Congress to the US president to fast track free trade negotiations between the US and foreign states. Despite the deadlines, both the US and the Malaysian sides were unable to move forward and hence, negotiation is still ongoing.

The issues affecting the negotiation are high tariffs imposed on imported US goods compared to imported Malaysian goods, restriction of import of motor vehicles into Malaysia, government procurement based on New Economic Policy which favours the local Malays, export subsidies, intellectual property rights, pharmaceutical, barriers in various services, investment requirements which is again related to the NEP and transparency in governance.

== Criticism ==
The free trade agreement has received opposition, particularly from the Consumers' Association of Penang.

The CAP rallied for the end of negotiations, stating that the free trade agreement would have serious impact in Malaysia on many issues, such as:

- Government procurements and the implications for ethnic relations in the country especially the 1Malaysia vision
- Investment and the implications for local jobs, small industries, companies, corporations and enterprises
- Intellectual property rights and access to affordable medicines and knowledge
- Agriculture and food security in relation to having an impact on local farmers and rice self-sufficiency
- Food safety related to labelling of GM foods, etc.
