= Marang, Terengganu =

Coordinates: 5°12′0″N 103°13′12″E

Marang Town
- Town and district capital
- Bandar Marang
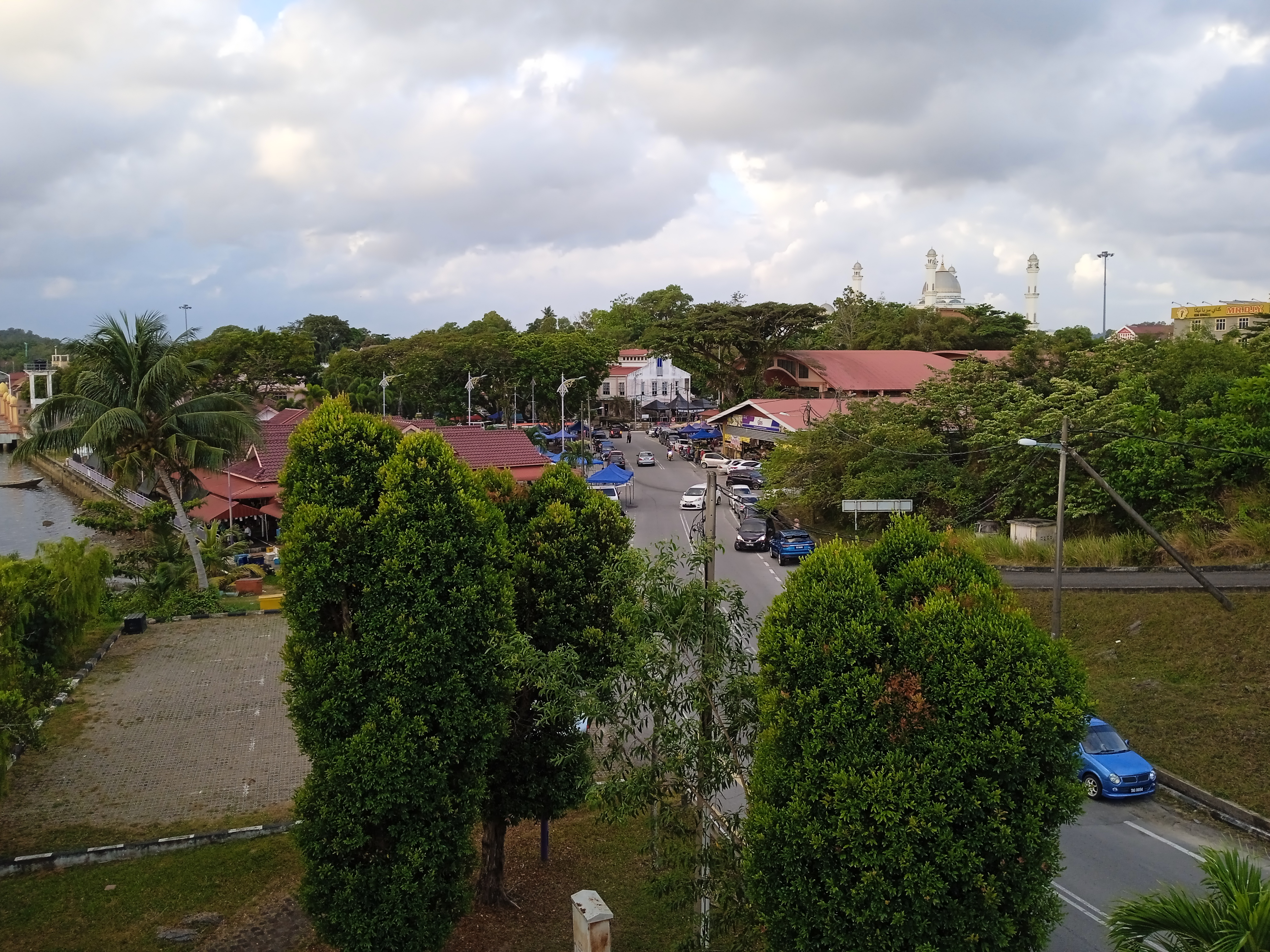

- Flag

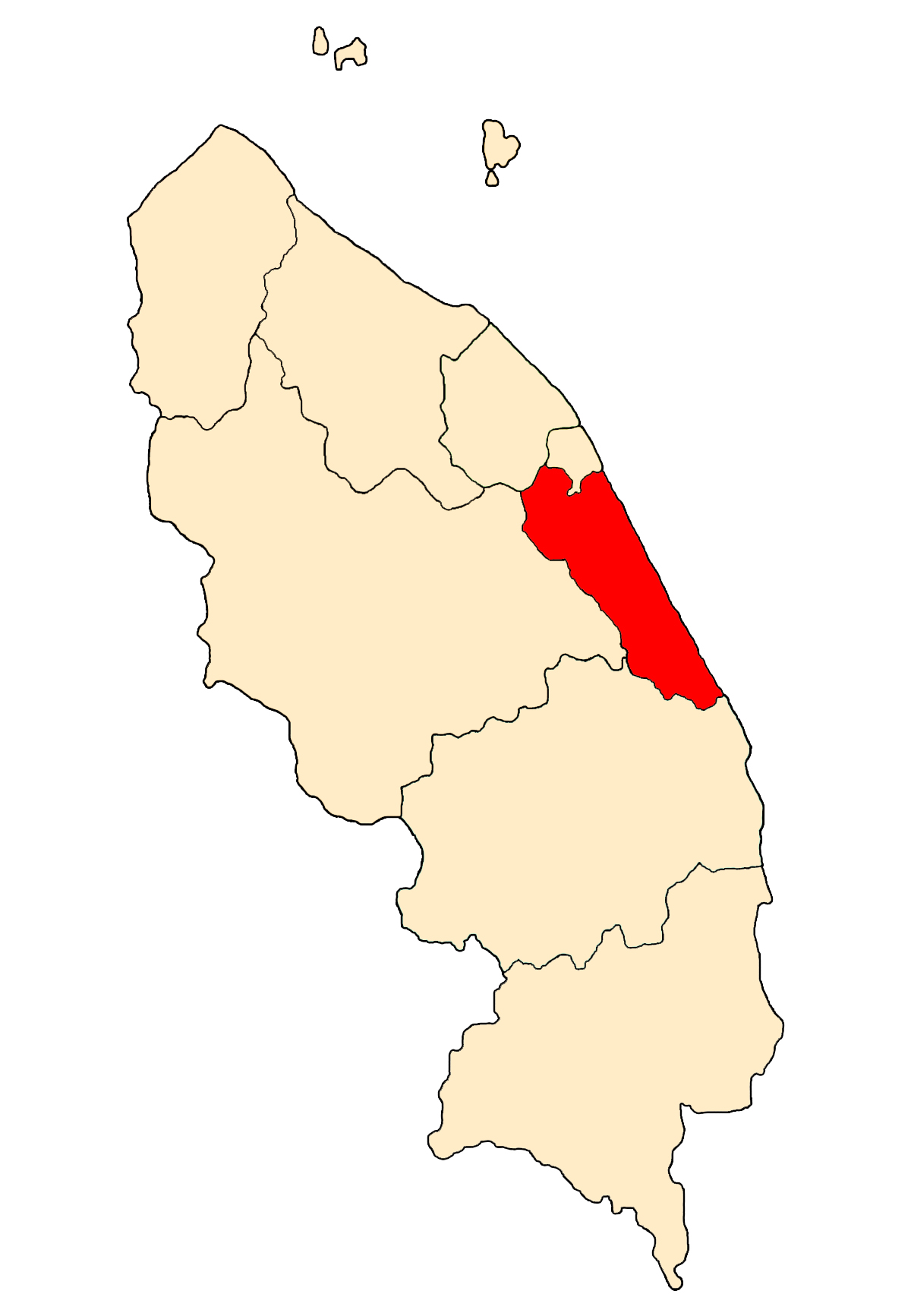

- Location of Marang, Terengganu in Malaysia
- Vehicle registration: t

Marang (est. pop. (2000 census): 4,896) is a town and the seat of Marang District, in the state of Terengganu, Malaysia. The town is located on the South China Sea coast on the main highway between Kuala Terengganu and Kuantan.

The main economic activity in Marang is fishery and tourism. Marang was an attractive hotspot for backpackers from all over the world for its rustic atmosphere and simple wooden shophouse architecture until the local government demolished them as part of modernizing the town late 1990s.

== Etymology ==
The origin of the district's name is attributed to one of the first settlers in the area known only as Ma, a Chinese entrepreneur who sold dried fish and squid off racks called rang by the local populace. Given Ma owned all the rangs in the town's local industry, the area became known as Ma Rang (i.e. 'Ma of the rangs'), which eventually became Marang. A teacher from Marang Primary School by the name of Osman proposes that alternatively Marang derives its name from how the locals pronounce a local figure named Syed Muharram.

== Climate ==
Marang has a tropical rainforest climate (Af) with heavy to very heavy rainfall year-round.

Climate data for Marang
Month	Jan	Feb	Mar	Apr	May	Jun	Jul	Aug	Sep	Oct	Nov	Dec	Year
Mean daily maximum °C (°F)	27.8 (82.0)	28.9 (84.0)	30.2 (86.4)	31.7 (89.1)	32.2 (90.0)	31.7 (89.1)	31.5 (88.7)	31.1 (88.0)	30.9 (87.6)	30.4 (86.7)	29.0 (84.2)	27.8 (82.0)	30.3 (86.5)
Daily mean °C (°F)	25.1 (77.2)	25.7 (78.3)	26.4 (79.5)	27.4 (81.3)	27.8 (82.0)	27.3 (81.1)	27.1 (80.8)	26.9 (80.4)	26.8 (80.2)	26.6 (79.9)	25.9 (78.6)	25.2 (77.4)	26.5 (79.7)
Mean daily minimum °C (°F)	22.5 (72.5)	22.6 (72.7)	22.7 (72.9)	23.2 (73.8)	23.4 (74.1)	22.9 (73.2)	22.8 (73.0)	22.8 (73.0)	22.8 (73.0)	22.8 (73.0)	22.8 (73.0)	22.7 (72.9)	22.8 (73.1)
Average rainfall mm (inches)	253 (10.0)	128 (5.0)	130 (5.1)	106 (4.2)	129 (5.1)	130 (5.1)	136 (5.4)	172 (6.8)	204 (8.0)	305 (12.0)	615 (24.2)	651 (25.6)	2,959 (116.5)
Source: Climate-Data.org

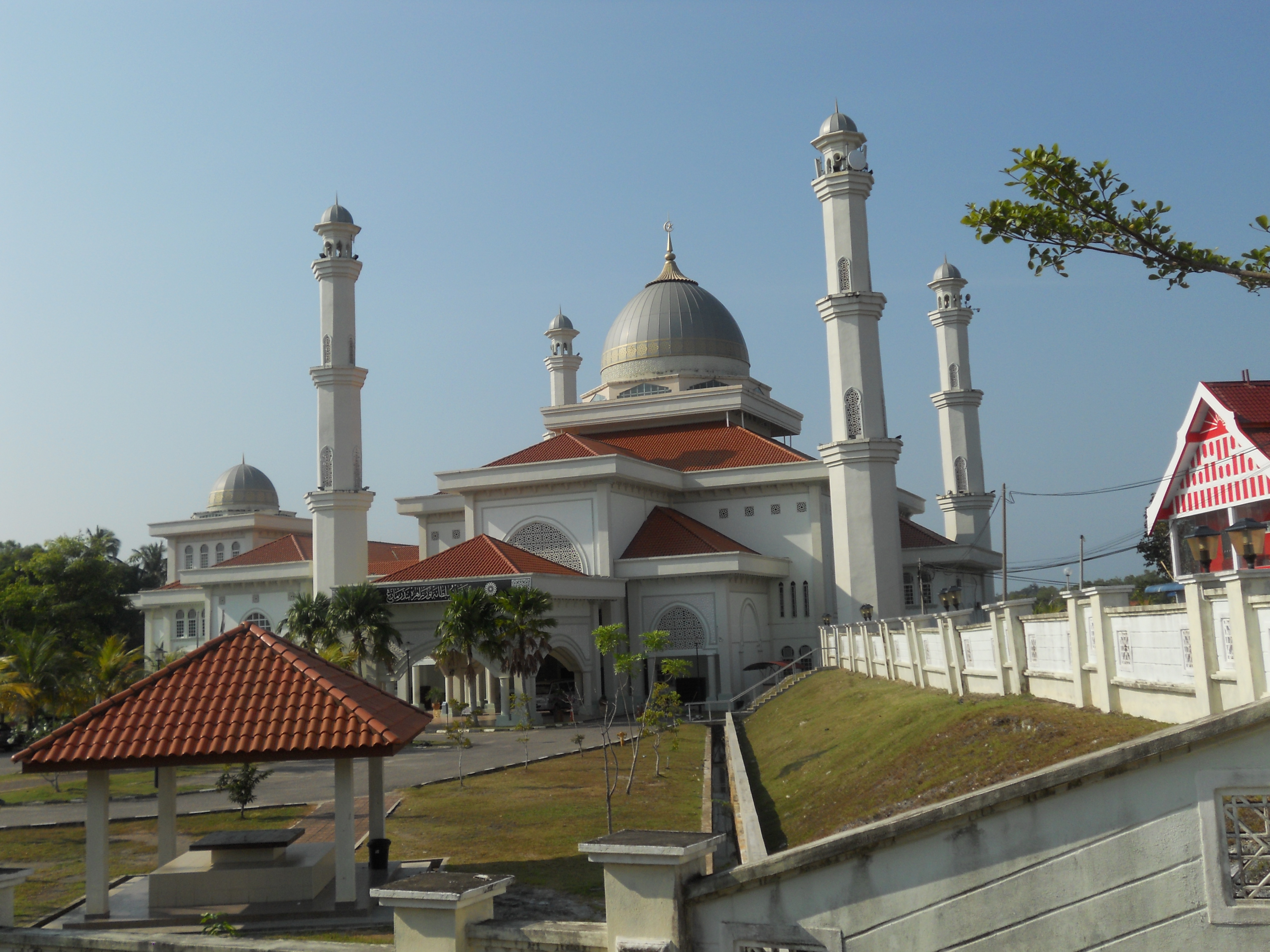
Sultanah Nur Zahirah Mosque in Marang, Terengganu, Malaysia
