= List of parliamentary by-elections in Malaysia =

Casual vacancies in the Dewan Rakyat (House of Representatives) are filled through by-elections, which may occur when a member of the Dewan Rakyat dies, resigns or for some other reason. Under Article 54(1) of the Constitution of Malaysia, the Election Commission of Malaysia has to call a by-election within 60 days of the establishment of the casual vacancy. A by-election is not held when there are less than two years left in the Parliament's term, unless the Speaker notifies the Election Commission that the casual vacancy affects the majority of the governing party.

Brackets around a date indicate that the candidate was unopposed when nominations closed. These candidates were declared "elected unopposed" with effect from the date of the closing of nominations, and there was no need to hold a by-election.

== 15th Parliament (2022–present) ==
By-election	Date	Incumbent	Party	Winner	Party	Cause
Petaling Jaya	Not held	Lee Chean Chung	PH (PKR)	—N/a		Resignation (change of party allegiance)
Subang	Not held	Wong Chen	PH (PKR)	—N/a		Resignation (change of party allegiance)
Setiawangsa	Not held	Nik Nazmi Nik Ahmad	PH (PKR)	—N/a		Resignation (change of party allegiance)
Pandan	Not held	Rafizi Ramli	PH (PKR)	—N/a		Resignation (change of party allegiance)
Kinabatangan	24 January 2026	Bung Moktar Radin	BN (UMNO)	Naim Moktar	BN (UMNO)	Death (kidney failure and lung infection)
Kemaman	2 December 2023	Che Alias Hamid	PN (PAS)	Ahmad Samsuri Mokhtar	PN (PAS)	Nullified and disqualified for element of bribery (election petition)
Pulai	9 September 2023	Salahuddin Ayub	PH (AMANAH)	Suhaizan Kayat	PH (AMANAH)	Death (brain hemorrhage)
Kuala Terengganu	12 August 2023	Ahmad Amzad Hashim	PN (PAS)	Ahmad Amzad Hashim	PN (PAS)	Nullified and disqualified for element of bribery (election petition)
Padang Serai	7 December 2022	Karupaiya Mutusami	PH (PKR)	Azman Nasrudin	PN (BERSATU)	The election was postponed from the original date because of the death of the incumbent after the nomination day.

== 14th Parliament (2018–2022) ==
By-election	Date	Incumbent	Party	Winner	Party	Cause
Pekan	Not held	Najib Razak	BN (UMNO)	—N/a		Disqualification (sentenced to jail (1MDB scandal))
Gerik	Cancelled	Hasbullah Osman	BN (UMNO)	—N/a		Death (heart attack)
Batu Sapi	Cancelled	Liew Vui Keong	WARISAN	—N/a		Death (pneumonia)
Kimanis	18 January 2020	Anifah Aman	Independent	Mohamad Alamin	BN (UMNO)	Nullified and disqualified for election process discrepancies (election petition)
Tanjung Piai	16 November 2019	Md Farid Md Rafik	PH (BERSATU)	Wee Jeck Seng	BN (MCA)	Death (heart attack)
Sandakan	11 May 2019	Stephen Wong Tien Fatt	PH (DAP)	Vivian Wong Shir Yee	PH (DAP)	Death (cardiac arrest)
Cameron Highlands	26 January 2019	Sivarraajh Chandran	BN (MIC)	Ramli Mohd. Noor	BN (Direct Member)	Nullified and disqualified for element of bribery (election petition)
Port Dickson	13 October 2018	Danyal Balagopal Abdullah	PH (PKR)	Anwar Ibrahim	PH (PKR)	Resignation ('PD Move')

== 13th Parliament (2013–2018) ==
By-election	Date	Incumbent	Party	Winner	Party	Cause
Paya Besar	Not held	Abdul Manan Ismail	BN (UMNO)	—N/a		Death (suspected heart attack & accident in a bathroom)
Jelebu	Not held	Zainuddin Ismail	BN (UMNO)	—N/a		Death (brain tumor)
Sungai Besar	18 June 2016	Noriah Kasnon	BN (UMNO)	Budiman Mohd Zohdi	BN (UMNO)	Death (helicopter crash) in Sarawak.
Kuala Kangsar	18 June 2016	Wan Mohammad Khair-il Anuar Wan Ahmad	BN (UMNO)	Mastura Mohd Yazid	BN (UMNO)	Death (helicopter crash) in Sarawak.
Permatang Pauh	7 May 2015	Anwar Ibrahim	PKR	Wan Azizah Wan Ismail	PKR	Disqualification (found guilty of sodomy)
Rompin	5 May 2015	Jamaluddin Mohd Jarjis	BN (UMNO)	Hasan Arifin	BN (UMNO)	Death (helicopter crash) in Semenyih, Selangor.
Telok Intan	31 May 2014	Seah Leong Peng	DAP	Mah Siew Keong	BN (Gerakan)	Death (bladder cancer)
Bukit Gelugor	25 May 2014	Karpal Singh	DAP	Ramkarpal Singh	DAP	Death (car accident)

== 12th Parliament (2008–13) ==
By-election	Date	Incumbent	Party	Winner	Party	Cause
Sabak Bernam	Not held	Abdul Rahman Bakri	BN (UMNO)	—N/a		Disqualification (sentenced to jail)
Titiwangsa	Not held	Lo' Lo' Mohamad Ghazali	PAS	—N/a		Death (cancer)
Batu Sapi	4 November 2010	Edmund Chong Ket Wah	BN (PBS)	Linda Tsen Thau Lin	BN (PBS)	Death (motorcycle accident)
Sibu	16 May 2010	Robert Lau Hoi Chew	BN (SUPP)	Wong Ho Leng	DAP	Death (liver cancer)
Hulu Selangor	25 April 2010	Zainal Abidin Ahmad	PKR	Kamalanathan Panchanathan	BN (MIC)	Death (brain cancer)
Bukit Gantang	7 April 2009	Roslan Shaharum	PAS	Mohammad Nizar Jamaluddin	PAS	Death (heart attack)
Kuala Terengganu	17 January 2009	Razali Ismail	BN (UMNO)	Mohd Abdul Wahid Endut	PAS	Death (heart attack)
Permatang Pauh	26 August 2008	Wan Azizah Wan Ismail	PKR	Anwar Ibrahim	PKR	Resignation to create vacancy

== 11th Parliament (2004–08) ==
By-election	Date	Incumbent	Party	Winner	Party	Cause
Labis	Not held	Chua Soi Lek	BN (MCA)	—N/a		Resignation; However, SPR did not hold a by-election.
Pasir Puteh	Not held	Kalthom Othman	PAS	Che Min Che Ahmad	BN (UMNO)	Election declared null and void. However, SPR did not hold a by-election.

== 10th Parliament (1999–2004) ==
By-election	Date	Incumbent	Party	Winner	Party	Cause
Kangar	Not held	Abdul Hamid Pawanteh	BN (UMNO)	—N/a		Resignation on appointment as President of Dewan Negara
Gaya	12 October 2002	Yong Teck Lee	BN (SAPP)	Liew Teck Chan	BN (SAPP)	Disqualification (found guilty of election offences)
Pendang	18 July 2002	Fadzil Noor	PAS	Othman Abdul	BN (UMNO)	Death (heart attack)
Telok Kemang	10 June 2000	S. A. Anpalagan	BN (MIC)	Sothinathan Sinna Goundar	BN (MIC)	Death (heart attack)

== 9th Parliament (1995–99) ==
By-election	Date	Incumbent	Party	Winner	Party	Cause
Permatang Pauh	Not held	Anwar Ibrahim	Independent	—N/a		Disqualification (found guilty of sodomy and corruption)
Kota Melaka	Not held	Lim Guan Eng	DAP	—N/a		Disqualification (jailed under Sedition Act)
Arau	4 July 1998	Kamarudin Ahmad	BN (UMNO)	Hashim Jasin	PAS	Death (stroke)
Kuala Selangor	29 May 1997	Abu Hassan Omar	BN (UMNO)	Jamaluddin Adnan	BN (UMNO)	Resignation (to contest in a Permatang by-election)
Telok Intan	17 May 1997	Ong Tin Kim	BN (Gerakan)	Kulasegaran Murugeson	DAP	Death (cancer)
Lipis	(15 January 1996)	Abu Dahari Osman	BN (UMNO)	Amihamzah Ahmad	BN (UMNO)	Death (colon cancer)
Bagan	9 September 1995	Patto Perumal	DAP	Lim Hock Seng	DAP	Death (heart attack)
Gua Musang	29 August 1995	Tengku Razaleigh Hamzah	S46	Tengku Razaleigh Hamzah	S46	Election declared null and void
Bukit Bintang	Not held	Wee Choo Keong	DAP	Lee Chong Meng	BN (MCA)	Election declared null and void. However, SPR did not hold a by-election.

== 8th Parliament (1990–95) ==
By-election	Date	Incumbent	Party	Winner	Party	Cause
Semporna	Not held	Sakaran Dandai	BN (UMNO)	—N/a		Resignation (on appointment as Yang di-Pertua Negeri of Sabah)
Kuala Nerus	Not held	Abdul Rashid Muhammad	BN (UMNO)	—N/a		Death (abdominal pain)
Jerai	4 March 1992	Ghazali Ahmad	BN (UMNO)	Badruddin Amiruldin	BN (UMNO)	Death (cancer)

== 7th Parliament (1986–90) ==
By-election	Date	Incumbent	Party	Winner	Party	Cause
Bentong	13 May 1989	Chan Siang Sun	BN (MCA)	Lim Ah Lek	BN (MCA)	Death (heart attack)
Ampang Jaya	28 January 1989	Lim Ann Koon	BN (MCA)	Ong Tee Keat	BN (MCA)	Resignation
Johor Bahru	25 August 1988	Shahrir Abdul Samad	BN (UMNO)	Shahrir Abdul Samad	Independent	Resigned to recontest
Gopeng	16 May 1987	Tan Koon Swan	BN (MCA)	Ting Chew Peh	BN (MCA)	Resignation (Pan-Electric Industries scandal and deposit-taking co-operative scandal; imprisoned in Singapore)
Limbawang	18 April 1987	Abdul Hamid Mustapha	BN (USNO)	Mustapha Harun	BN (USNO)	Death (heart attack)
Lubok Antu	4 April 1987	Andrew Janggi Muyang	BN (PBDS)	Jawah Gerang	BN (PBDS)	Death (car accident)

== 6th Parliament (1982–86) ==
By-election	Date	Incumbent	Party	Winner	Party	Cause
Ulu Padas	11–12 October 1985	Harris Salleh	BN (BERJAYA)	Kadoh Agundong	PBS	Resignation
Padang Terap	19 January 1985	Syed Ahmad Syed Mahmud Shahabuddin	BN (UMNO)	Baharom Abu Bakar	BN (UMNO)	Resignation on appointment as Yang di-Pertua Negeri of Malacca
Seremban	19 November 1983	Lee San Choon	BN (MCA)	Chen Man Hin	DAP	Resignation
Tampin	24 September 1983	Mokhtar Hashim	BN (UMNO)	Omar Abdullah	BN (UMNO)	Resignation (convicted of murder)
Ulu Muda	16 March 1983	Hashim Endut	BN (UMNO)	Othman Abdul	BN (UMNO)	Resignation (found guilty of offence involving the wholesale of rice)

== 5th Parliament (1978–82) ==
By-election	Date	Incumbent	Party	Winner	Party	Cause
Sri Gading	26 September 1981	Hussein Onn	BN (UMNO)	Mustaffa Mohammad	BN (UMNO)	Resignation
Paloh	(4 May 1981)	Abdul Rahman Ya'kub	BN (PBB)	Abang Abu Bakar Abang Mustapha	BN (PBB)	Resignation (to accept the position of Yang di-Pertua Negeri of Sarawak)
Kimanis	(9 April 1981)	Pengiran Aliuddin Pengiran Tahir	BN (BERJAYA)	Pengiran Othman Pengiran Rauf	BN (BERJAYA)	Resignation (to contest in 1981 Sabah state election)
Mukah	(28 January 1980)	Salleh Jafaruddin	BN (PBB)	Edwin Esnen Unang	BN (PBB)	Resignation (to contest in Oya by-election)
Pelabuhan Kelang	1 December 1979	V. Manickavasagam	BN (MIC)	V. Govindaraj	BN (MIC)	Death (heart attack)

== 4th Parliament (1974–78) ==
By-election	Date	Incumbent	Party	Winner	Party	Cause
Pontian	28 January 1978	Ali Ahmad	BN (UMNO)	Ikhwan Nasir	BN (UMNO)	Death (MH653 crash)
Keningau	26–30 July 1977	Stephen Robert Evans	BN (USNO)	Harris Salleh	BN (BERJAYA)	Resignation
Panti	(24 February 1977)	Syed Jaafar Albar	BN (UMNO)	Saadun Muhammad Noh	BN (UMNO)	Death (stroke)
Kimanis	29 January 1977	Pengiran Tahir Pengiran Petra	BN (USNO)	Pengiran Aliuddin Pengiran Tahir	Independent	Death
Kemaman	8 May 1976	Wan Abdul Kadir Ismail	BN (UMNO)	Abdul Manan Othman	BN (UMNO)	Death
Pekan	(21 February 1976)	Abdul Razak Hussein	BN (UMNO)	Mohd Najib Abdul Razak	BN (UMNO)	Death (leukaemia)
Selayang	14 June 1975	Walter Loh Poh Khan	BN (MCA)	Rosemary Chow Poh Kheng	BN (MCA)	Death

== 3rd Parliament (1971–74) ==
By-election	Date	Incumbent	Party	Winner	Party	Cause
Rajang	7–12 January 1974	Tibuoh Rantai	SUPP	Jawan Empaling	SUPP	Death
Johore Timor	(8 September 1973)	Ismail Abdul Rahman	Alliance (UMNO)	Abdul Rahman Sabri	Alliance (UMNO)	Death (heart attack)
Kuala Kedah	20 January 1973	Tunku Abdul Rahman	Alliance (UMNO)	Senu Abd Rahman	Alliance (UMNO)	Resignation
Rembau-Tampin	8 July 1972	Sulaiman Mohamed Attas	Alliance (UMNO)	Mokhtar Hashim	Alliance (UMNO)	Death
Ulu Selangor	3 June 1972	Khaw Kai Boh	Alliance (MCA)	Michael Chen Wing Sum	Alliance (MCA)	Death (heart attack)
Lipis	8 April 1972	Abdul Razak Hussin	Alliance (UMNO)	Ghazali Shafie	Alliance (UMNO)	Resignation
Bau-Lundu	11–14 October 1971	Sinyium Mutit	SUPP	Joseph Valentine Cotter	SUPP	Resignation
Kapar	3 April 1971	Hamzah Alang	Alliance (UMNO)	Mohd. Tahir Abdul Manan	Alliance (UMNO)	Death
Malacca Selatan	30 January 1971	Abdul Karim Abu	Alliance (UMNO)	Ahmad Ithnin	Alliance (UMNO)	Election for Malacca Selatan federal constituency and another 40 federal constituencies in Sabah and Sarawak were postponed from the scheduled date, 10 May 1969.

== 2nd Parliament (1964–69) ==
By-election	Date	Incumbent	Party	Winner	Party	Cause
Kuantan	(11 November 1968)	Abdul Rahman Talib	Alliance (UMNO)	Mohamed Taib	Alliance (UMNO)	Death (heart attack)
Segamat Utara	19 October 1968	Abdullah Mohd Salleh	Alliance (UMNO)	Musa Hitam	Alliance (UMNO)	Death
Kelantan Hilir	21 October 1967	Ahmad Abdullah	PAS	Nik Abdul Aziz Nik Mat	PAS	Death (car accident)
Pasir Mas Hulu	19 August 1967	Abdul Samad Gul Ahmad Mianji	PAS	Tengku Zaid Tengku Ahmad	PAS	Death (murder)
Raub	(14 August 1967)	Hussein Hassan	Alliance (UMNO)	Hamzah Abu Samah	Alliance (UMNO)	Death
Bruas	4 June 1966	Yeoh Tat Beng	Alliance (MCA)	Chew Biow Chuon	Alliance (MCA)	Death (car accident)
Krian Laut	12 March 1966	Abdul Rauf Abdul Rahman	Alliance (UMNO)	Sulaiman Taib	Alliance (UMNO)	Death (long illness)
Seberang Selatan	31 October 1964	Mohamed Noordin Mastan	Alliance (UMNO)	Snawi Ismail	Alliance (UMNO)	Death
Bachok	27 June 1964	Zulkiflee Muhammad	PAS	Abu Bakar Hamzah	PAS	Death (car accident)

== 1st Parliament (1959–64) ==
By-election	Date	Incumbent	Party	Winner	Party	Cause
Muar Selatan	28 December 1963	Sulaiman Abdul Rahman	Alliance (UMNO)	Awang Hassan	Alliance (UMNO)	Death (heart attack)

Establishment of Malaysia Successor to Federation of Malaya, North Borneo, Sarawak, Singapore
Lipis	20 October 1962	Mohamed Sulong Mohd. Ali	Alliance (UMNO)	Abdul Razak Hussin	Alliance (UMNO)	Death
Kuala Trengganu Selatan	19 March 1962	Onn Jaafar	Parti Negara	Ismail Kassim	Alliance (UMNO)	Death (heart attack)
Telok Anson	30 May 1961	Woo Saik Hong	Alliance (MCA)	Too Joon Hing	Independent	Death
Kampar	18 May 1960	Leong Kee Nyean	Alliance (MCA)	Chan Yoon Onn	PPP	Disqualification (found guilty of election offences)
Kedah Tengah	30 September 1959	Khir Johari	Alliance (UMNO)	Khir Johari	Alliance (UMNO)	The only remaining constituency where elections have not been completed in the Malayan general election, 1959.

== Federal Legislative Council (1955–59) ==
By-election	Date	Incumbent	Party	Winner	Party	Cause
Batu Pahat	14 December 1957	S. Chelvasingam MacIntyre	Alliance (MIC)	Syed Esa Alwee	Alliance (UMNO)	Resignation on appointment as Malayan High; Commissioner to India
Ipoh-Menglembu	23 November 1957	Leong Yew Koh	Alliance (MCA)	D. R. Seenivasagam	PPP	Resignation on appointment as Yang di-Pertua Negeri of Malacca
Sungei Perak Ulu	26 October 1957	Mohamed Ghazali Jawi	Alliance (UMNO)	Meor Samsudin Meor Yahya	Alliance (UMNO)	Resignation on appointment as Menteri Besar of Perak
