= Kuala Terengganu (disambiguation) =

Kuala Terengganu or Kuala Trengganu may refer to:

- Kuala Terengganu, capital of Terengganu, Malaysia
- Kuala Terengganu District
- Kuala Terengganu (federal constituency), represented in the Dewan Rakyat
- Bandar Kuala Trengganu, formerly represented in the Trengganu State Council (1954–59)
- Kuala Trengganu Barat, formerly represented in the Trengganu State Council (1954–59)
- Kuala Trengganu Selatan, formerly represented in the Trengganu State Council (1954–59)
- Kuala Trengganu Tengah, formerly represented in the Trengganu State Council (1954–59); Trengganu State Legislative Council (1959–74)
- Kuala Trengganu Utara, formerly represented in the Trengganu State Council (1954–59)
