= 2023 Kuala Terengganu by-election =

By-election in Malaysia in 2023

- 12 August 2023

P036 Kuala Terengganu seat in the Dewan Rakyat
- Turnout: 73.34%
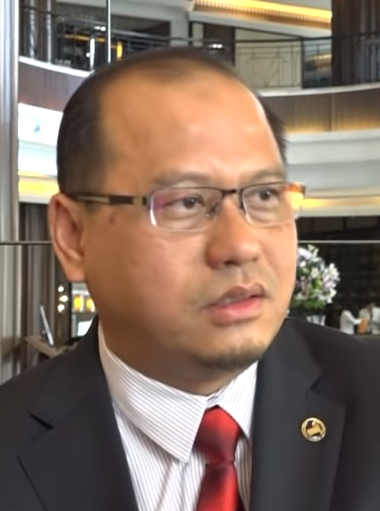
		PH
Candidate	Ahmad Amzad Hashim	Azan Ismail
Party	PAS	PKR
Alliance	PN	PH
Popular vote	68,369	21,103
Percentage	76.41%	23.59%
MP before election
Ahmad Amzad Hashim (disqualified)
PN (PAS)
Elected MP
Ahmad Amzad Hashim
PN (PAS)

The 2023 Kuala Terengganu by-election is a by-election that were held on 12 August 2023 for the Dewan Rakyat seat of Kuala Terengganu. It was called following the disqualification of incumbent, Ahmad Amzad Hashim on 27 June 2023.

The election is the first by-election since GE15 (Note: Not counting the federal by-election for Padang Serai and state by-election for Tioman, both which were delayed to 7 December 2022 because of death of respective candidates after nomination day for GE15. Both by-elections and results are considered as part of the 2022 general elections and 2022 Pahang state election.) and the second by-election that was held in the constituency since 2009. The by-election was held concurrently with the 2023 Terengganu state election.

Amzad was re-elected as the Kuala Terengganu MP in the by-election with a majority of 47,266 votes over the other candidate. He also the first person re-elected after disqualified in same constituency since Tengku Razaleigh Hamzah in 1995.

== Background ==
Kuala Terengganu is a Malay/Muslim-majority seat comprising predominantly 90.8% of the overall voters, followed by 8.6% Chinese, 0.5% Indians and 0.2% of other ethnicities.

Ahmad Amzad, a member of the Malaysian Islamic Party (PAS) of Perikatan Nasional (PN) was first elected as the Member of Parliament (MP) for Kuala Terengganu in Terengganu defeating Mohd Zubir Embong of the United Malays National Organisation (UMNO) of Barisan Nasional (BN) coalition, Raja Kamarul Bahrin of the National Trust Party (AMANAH) of Pakatan Harapan (PH) coalition and Mohamad Abu Bakar Muda of the Parti Bumiputera Perkasa Malaysia (PUTRA) of Gerakan Tanah Air (GTA) coalition by a majority of 40,907 votes in 2022 general election (GE15).

On 27 June 2023, the Terengganu Election Court annulled the results of the Kuala Terengganu seat in the 2022 general election. With this, Ahmad Amzad lost his seat and was disqualified as an MP with immediate effect. Judge Mohd Firuz Jaffril ruled that the petitioner and the BN candidate in the election Mohd Zubir succeeded in proving that corruption had taken place with the aim of influencing voters in the election. He added that although Mohd Zubir was not presented as a witness, other evidence was sufficient to declare the results null and void. The court also ordered Ahmad Amzad to pay RM50,000 to Mohd Zubir and allowed Ahmad Amzad to file an appeal within 14 days. Ahmad Amzad was represented by lawyer Wan Rohimi Wan Daud while Mohd Zubir was by lawyer Mohd Hafarizam Harun. Wan Rohimi stressed that they would file a notice of appeal to the Federal Court. However, on 8 July 2023, Wan Rohimi announced that Ahmad Amzad and PAS had decided not to do so and hoped that the by-election triggered by the decision would be held simultaneously with the state elections on 12 August 2023, a move that has raised eyebrows from AMANAH, which its deputy president Salahuddin Ayub stated that it was as if PAS themselves had admitted that there were elements of corruption and they were simply admitting to it. On 18 July 2023, the Election Commission (EC) announced the key dates of the by-election, which are to be held simultaneously with the state elections.

== Nomination ==
On 22 July 2023, Prime Minister and Chairman of Pakatan Harapan (PH) Anwar Ibrahim announced that the coalition would nominate former Member of Parliament (MP) for Indera Mahkota and former Member of the Terengganu State Legislative Assembly (MLA) for Bandar Azan Ismail to contest for the seat. BN did not contest for the seat as a result of paving the way for PH in respect of the political cooperation between the two coalitions. On 27 July 2023, State Commissioner of PAS of Terengganu, Husain Awang announced that PN would renominate Ahmad Amzad to defend the seat again. On the nomination day on 29 July 2023, Azan and Ahmad Amzad were officially nominated as the candidates for the seat in the by-election.

For the by-election, Perikatan Nasional has decided to use the PAS logo and name for its candidate.

== Timeline ==
The key dates are listed below.

Date	Event
27 June 2023	Ahmad Amzad Hashim was disqualified as an MP with immediate effect.
18 July 2023	Issue of the Writ of Election
29 July 2023	Nomination Day
29 July–11 August 2023	Campaigning Period
8–11 August 2023	Early Polling Day For Postal, Overseas and Advance Voters
12 August 2023	Polling Day

== Results ==
Malaysian general by-election, 12 August 2023: Kuala Terengganu Upon the disqualification of the incumbent, Ahmad Amzad Hashim
Party	Candidate	Votes	%	∆%
PAS	Ahmad Amzad Hashim	68,369	84.96	▲19.69
PH	Azan Ismail	21,103	15.04	▲3.70
Total valid votes		89,472	100.00	
Total rejected ballots		1,049		
Unreturned ballots		111		
Turnout		90,632	73.34	
Registered electors		123,397		
Majority		47,266		
PAS hold		Swing		
Source(s) https://lom.agc.gov.my/ilims/upload/portal/akta/outputp/1852017/P.U.%20(B)%20376_2023.pdf

== Previous results ==
Malaysian general election, 2022: Kuala Terengganu
Party	Candidate	Votes	%	∆%
PAS	Ahmad Amzad Hashim	63,016	65.27	+15.62
BN	Mohd Zubir Embong	22,109	22.90	-9.69
PH	Raja Kamarul Bahrin Shah Raja Ahmad	10,946	11.34	-6.42
PEJUANG	Mohamad Abu Bakar Muda	481	0.50	+0.50
Total valid votes		96,552	100.00	
Total rejected ballots		767		
Unreturned ballots		266		
Turnout		97,605	78.30	
Registered electors		123,305		
Majority		40,907		
PAS hold		Swing		
Source(s) https://lom.agc.gov.my/ilims/upload/portal/akta/outputp/1753269/PUB608%20PARLIMEN%20TERENGGANU.pdf

== Aftermath ==
Amzad, the winner of the by-election, were sworn in as the new MP for Kuala Terengganu on 5 September, before Dewan Rakyat Speaker Johari Abdul in the Parliamentary Special Chamber at Dewan Rakyat.
