= 2007 Terengganu riot =

2007 riot in Terengganu, Malaysia

- 2007 Batu Buruk riot
- Date: 8 September 2007
- Location: Batu Buruk, Terengganu, Malaysia
- Status: Held

Parties
Bersih	Royal Malaysia Police

Casualties and losses
24 arrested	+2 wounded

The 2007 Terengganu riot was an incident on 8 September 2007 in Terengganu, Malaysia where a peaceful rally became violent after intervention by the Malaysian police. The police fired water cannons, tear gas, and live ammunition at the rally participants, and two protestors were injured from the police's gunshots. Following the riot, the Human Rights Commission of Malaysia announced that they would open inquiries probing into the events of that night.

== Background ==
According to the Public Order Ordinance and the Police Act in the Constitution of Malaysia, a permit is required for any public assembly of five or more persons. At the end of August 2007, a coalition of non-governmental organisations called Bersih applied for a permit from the police to organise a rally on 8 September at 9 pm in Batu Buruk, Terengganu. They said that the purpose of their rally was a campaign for electoral reforms. Their application was denied on 6 September by the police who said that the event organisers had failed to provide sufficient information about how they were going to handle traffic and security issues. However, a large group of people still gathered on 8 September. Most of the people were supporters of the political party, the Malaysian Islamic Party.

== Rally incidents ==
During the rally, police asked the demonstrators to disperse and end the rally over a span of five warnings, but they refused. After the crowd ignored the police's final warning which included arrest threats, the police moved in to disperse the crowd. The crowd responded to the police's action by throwing stones and small rocks at them. These actions marked the beginning of the riot. Consequently, riot police from the Federal Reserve Unit were deployed, and at about 10:30 pm, they began to spray the crowd with chemical-laced water cannons and tear gas. The police also began to arrest the rioters.

At 11:45 pm, a police officer fired four live rounds from his pistol, and the bullets from his shots hit two members of the Malaysian Islamic Party. Suwandi Abdul Ghani was injured in the chest, and Muhamad Azman Aziz was injured in the neck. They survived the gunshots and were brought to the hospital, where Suwandi had to have a bullet removed from his right lung. Meanwhile, the riot police continued to fire water cannons and tear gas at the crowd throwing objects at them until past midnight, and by 12:30 am on 9 September, the police had already arrested 13 people, including a journalist. The riot ended not long after that, with the police beginning to leave at 1 am.

== Aftermath ==
By 9 September 24 people who were at the riot had been arrested. In the days that followed the riot, there were pictures published of rioters burning the national flag. It was claimed that police officers had taken pictures of the flag being burnt, and subsequently, provided those pictures to a news agency. These claims were denied by the Terengganu police chief, Ayub Yaakob. There were also claims that news organisations were not allow to enter the riot location, and some people had their cameras confiscated by the police. The rally organisers said that there were undercover police in the crowd who were acting as inciting agents. The Terengganu state government estimated that the damages caused during the riot amounted to a total of RM1 million.

According to the police, the officer who had fired the gunshots had done so in self-defence. They said that he had been surrounded by a group of rioters who were physically harming him. However, the event organisers said that the police's action was unprovoked. On 9 December, the two gunshot victims were arrested and charged with participating in an unlawful gathering, as well as intentionally causing injury to a police officer. When they appeared in court for the hearing of their charges, they were denied bail.

On 13 September, the Human Rights Commission of Malaysia announced that they would conduct a preliminary fact-finding mission on 19 September to find out what really happened on the night of the riot. Their fact-finding mission reported that during the riot, there were police brutality and human rights violations. However, on 9 October, the Human Rights Commission announced that they would not be holding a further public inquiry due to the ongoing court proceedings. Supporters of the planned rally expressed their disappointment and questioned the Human Rights Commission's decision. On 15 November, the Human Rights Commission announced that they would be holding the public inquiry on 11–15 December to further investigate the police's use of live ammunition since there were no ongoing court proceedings about it. On 13 December, the Human Rights Commission cancelled the public inquiry due to the ongoing court proceedings of the two gunshot victims who had been charged at the Sessions Court of Kuala Terengganu on 9 December for injuring a police officer.
