= Endau (state constituency) =

Political subdivision in Malaysia

Endau (N32)
Johor constituency

State constituency
- Legislature: Johor State Legislative Assembly
MLA
Alwiyah Talib
BN
- Constituency created: 1957
- First contested: 1959
- Last contested: 2026

Demographics
- Population (2020): 33,245
- Electors (2026): 28,767
- Area (km²): 1,104

Endau is a state constituency in Johor, Malaysia, that is represented in the Johor State Legislative Assembly.

The state constituency was first contested in 1959 and is mandated to return a single Assemblyman to the Johor State Legislative Assembly under the first-past-the-post voting system.

== Demographics ==
As of 2020, Endau has a population of 33,245 people.

Ethnic breakdown of Endau's electorate as of 2026
1. Malay (80.2%)
2. Chinese (13.4%)
3. Other ethnicities (5.70%)
4. Indian (0.70%)

== History ==
=== Polling districts ===
According to the gazette issued on 2 July 2026, the Endau constituency has a total of 20 polling districts.

State constituency	Polling districts	Code	Location
Endau（N32）	Padang Endau	154/32/01	SMK Ungku Husin; SK Pusat Air Tawar
Endau（N32）	Bandar Endau Utara	154/32/02	SK Bandar Endau
Endau（N32）	Bandar Endau Selatan	154/32/03	SA Bandar Endau
Endau（N32）	Kampung Hubong	154/32/04	SK Pusat Air Tawar; SK Labong
Endau（N32）	Kampung Hubong Barat	154/32/05	SJK (C) Kg Hubong
Endau（N32）	Rancangan FELDA Endau	154/32/06	SK Lembaga Endau
Endau（N32）	Triang	154/32/07	SK Teriang
Endau（N32）	Penyabong	154/32/08	SK Penyabong
Endau（N32）	Tanjong Resang	154/32/09	SK Tanjung Resang
Endau（N32）	Ayer Papan	154/32/10	SK Air Papan
Endau（N32）	Tanjong Genting	154/32/11	Balai Raya Kg. Tanjung Genting
Endau（N32）	Mersing Kanan	154/32/12	SRA Bersepadu Mersing
Endau（N32）	Jalan Endau	154/32/13	SMK Mersing
Endau（N32）	Jalan Abdullah	154/32/14	SA Mersing Kanan
Endau（N32）	Kampong Tengah	154/32/15	SK Mersing Kanan
Endau（N32）	Sawah Dato'	154/32/16	SK Sawah Dato'
Endau（N32）	Tenglu	154/32/17	SK Tenglu
Endau（N32）	Tanah Abang	154/32/18	SK Tanah Abang
Endau（N32）	Kampong Punan	154/32/19	SK Punan
Endau（N32）	Kampong Peta	154/32/20	SK Peta

=== Representation history ===
Members of the Legislative Assembly for Endau
Assembly	No	Years	Member	Party
Constituency created
1st	N27	1959-1964	Ali Affendi Ahmad	Alliance (UMNO)
2nd	N27	1964-1969	Ali Raya	Alliance (UMNO)
		1969-1971	Assembly dissolved	
3rd	N27	1971–1973	Ramli Othman	Alliance (UMNO)
3rd	N27	1973-1974	Ramli Othman	BN (UMNO)
4th	N07	1974-1978	Abdul Rahman Sabri	BN (UMNO)
5th	N07	1978-1982	Abdul Rahman Sabri	BN (UMNO)
6th	N07	1982-1986	Abdul Ajib Ahmad	BN (UMNO)
7th	N09	1986-1990	Khadri Sabran	BN (UMNO)
8th	N09	1990-1995	Ishak Awang	BN (UMNO)
9th	N09	1995-1999	Abdul Latiff Ahmad	BN (UMNO)
10th	N09	1999-2004	Zainal Abidin Osman	BN (UMNO)
11th	N32	2004-2008	Zainal Abidin Osman	BN (UMNO)
12th	N32	2008-2013	Zainal Abidin Osman	BN (UMNO)
13th	N32	2013-2018	Abd Latif Bandi	BN (UMNO)
14th	N32	2018	Alwiyah Talib	BN (UMNO)
14th	N32	2018-2020	Alwiyah Talib	PH (BERSATU)
14th	N32	2020-2022	Alwiyah Talib	PN (BERSATU)
15th	N32	2022–2026	Alwiyah Talib	PN (BERSATU)
16th	N32	2026-present	Alwiyah Talib	BN (UMNO)

== Election results ==
Johor state election, 2026
Party	Candidate	Votes	%	∆%
BN	Alwiyah Talib	9,529	51.62	▲16.15
PN	Hasnul Hakimi Hussien	5,984	32.42	▼23.06
PH	Saiful Nizam Samat	2,552	13.83	▲6.23
ASLI	Jati Awang	394	2.13	▲2.13
Total valid votes		18,459	100.00	
Total rejected ballots		244		
Unreturned ballots		41		
Turnout		18,744	65.16	▲9.74
Registered electors		28,767		
Majority		3,545	19.20	▼0.80
BN gain from PN		Swing		?

Johor state election, 2022
Party	Candidate	Votes	%	∆%
PN	Alwiyah Talib	8,433	55.48	▲55.48
BN	Youzaimi Yusof	5,392	35.47	▼12.48
PH	Mohammad Fakrulradzi Mahmud	1,154	7.60	▲7.60
PEJUANG	Mohd Noorhisyam Ibrahim	145	0.95	▲0.95
Independent	Ismail Don	77	0.51	▲0.51
Total valid votes		15,201	100.00	
Total rejected ballots		212		
Unreturned ballots		61		
Turnout		15,474	55.41	▼22.80
Registered electors		27,924		
Majority		3,041	20.01	▼0.69
PN gain from BN		Swing		?

Johor state election, 2018
Party	Candidate	Votes	%	∆%
BN	Alwiyah Talib	7,136	47.95	▼12.24
PKR	Norul Haszarul Abu Samah	4,056	27.26	▲27.26
PAS	Roslan Nikmat	3,689	24.79	▼15.02
Total valid votes		14,881	100.00	
Total rejected ballots		343		
Unreturned ballots		58		
Turnout		15,282	78.22	▼3.85
Registered electors		19,538		
Majority		3,080	20.70	▲0.31
BN hold		Swing		

Johor state election, 2013
Party	Candidate	Votes	%	∆%
BN	Abd Latif Bandi	9,183	60.19	▼5.47
PAS	Mohd Azam Abd Razak	6,073	39.81	▲5.47
Total valid votes		15,256	100.00	
Total rejected ballots		311		
Unreturned ballots		58		
Turnout		15,625	82.06	▲11.07
Registered electors		19,040		
Majority		3,110	20.39	▼10.94
BN hold		Swing		

Johor state election, 2008
Party	Candidate	Votes	%	∆%
BN	Zainal Abidin Osman	7,393	65.66	▼7.56
PAS	Ahmad Said	3,866	34.34	▲7.56
Total valid votes		11,259	100.00	
Total rejected ballots		261		
Unreturned ballots		30		
Turnout		11,550	70.99	▲1.83
Registered electors		16,269		
Majority		3,527	31.33	▼15.11
BN hold		Swing		

Johor state election, 2004
Party	Candidate	Votes	%	∆%
BN	Zainal Abidin Osman	8,341	73.22	▲10.19
PAS	Shahar Abdullah	3,051	26.78	▼10.19
Total valid votes		11,392	100.00	
Total rejected ballots		244		
Unreturned ballots		13		
Turnout		11,649	69.17	▲1.23
Registered electors		16,842		
Majority		5,290	46.44	▲20.38
BN hold		Swing		

Johor state election, 1995
Party	Candidate	Votes	%	∆%
BN	Abdul Latiff Ahmad	7,315	68.90	▲6.12
PAS	Shekh Abdullah Said Salleh	3,302	31.10	▼3.56
Total valid votes		10,617	100.00	
Total rejected ballots		29		
Unreturned ballots		22		
Turnout		10,668	64.36	▼3.93
Registered electors		16,575		
Majority		4,013	37.80	▲9.68
BN hold		Swing		

Johor state election, 1990
Party	Candidate	Votes	%	∆%
BN	Ishak Awang	6,193	62.78	▼15.02
PAS	Sheikh Ibrahim Salleh	3,419	34.66	▲12.46
Independent	Hashim Bidin	252	2.55	▲2.55
Total valid votes		9,864	100.00	
Total rejected ballots		488		
Unreturned ballots		0		
Turnout		10,352	68.29	▲2.73
Registered electors		15,158		
Majority		2,774	28.12	▼27.48
BN hold		Swing		

Johor state election, 1986
Party	Candidate	Votes	%	∆%
BN	Khadri Sabran	7,023	77.80	▼3.65
PAS	Ismail Ali	2,004	22.20	▲3.65
Total valid votes		9,027	100.00	
Total rejected ballots		460		
Unreturned ballots		0		
Turnout		9,487	65.57	▼7.29
Registered electors		14,469		
Majority		5,019	55.60	▼7.29
BN hold		Swing		

Johor state election, 1982
Party	Candidate	Votes	%	∆%
BN	Abdul Ajib Ahmad	6,760	81.45	▲1.63
PAS	Ibrahim Abdullah	1,540	18.55	▼1.63
Total valid votes		8,300	100.00	
Total rejected ballots		409		
Unreturned ballots		0		
Turnout		8,709	72.85	▼3.38
Registered electors		11,954		
Majority		5,220	62.89	▲3.26
BN hold		Swing		

Johor state election, 1978
Party	Candidate	Votes	%	∆%
BN	Abd. Rahman Sabri	5,445	79.82	▼2.19
PAS	Ibrahim Abdullah	1,377	20.18	▲20.18
Total valid votes		6,822	100.00	
Total rejected ballots		702		
Unreturned ballots		0		
Turnout		7,524	76.24	▲3.42
Registered electors		9,869		
Majority		4,068	59.63	▼4.38
BN hold		Swing		

Johor state election, 1974
Party	Candidate	Votes	%	∆%
BN	Abd. Rahman Sabri	4,845	82.01	▲9.40
PEKEMAS	Asmuni Puteh	1,063	17.99	▲17.99
Total valid votes		5,908	100.00	
Total rejected ballots		208		
Unreturned ballots		0		
Turnout		6,116	72.82	▲0.77
Registered electors		8,399		
Majority		3,782	64.01	▲18.81
BN gain from Alliance		Swing		-

Johor state election, 1969
Party	Candidate	Votes	%	∆%
Alliance	Ramli Othman	4,863	72.60	▼16.32
PMIP	Ibrahim Abdullah	1,835	27.40	▲16.32
Total valid votes		6,698	100.00	
Total rejected ballots		1,030		
Unreturned ballots		0		
Turnout		7,728	72.05	▼6.71
Registered electors		10,726		
Majority		3,028	45.21	▼32.65
Alliance hold		Swing		

Johor state election, 1964
Party	Candidate	Votes	%	∆%
Alliance	Ali Raya	5,285	88.93	▲13.51
PMIP	Wan Mohamad Zain Abdullah	658	11.07	▲11.07
Total valid votes		5,943	100.00	
Total rejected ballots		559		
Unreturned ballots		0		
Turnout		6,502	78.75	▲4.99
Registered electors		8,256		
Majority		4,627	77.86	▲20.28
Alliance hold		Swing		

Johor state election, 1959
Party	Candidate	Votes	%
Alliance	Ali Affendi Ahmad	3,639	75.42
National Party	Mahmood Mahadi	861	17.84
Independent	Arifin Ismail	325	6.74
Total valid votes		4,825	100.00
Total rejected ballots		116	
Unreturned ballots		0	
Turnout		4,941	73.77
Registered electors		6,698	
Majority		2,778	57.58
This was a new constituency created.
