= Kuala Trengganu Selatan =

Terengganu constituency

Defunct federal constituency
- Legislature: Dewan Rakyat
- Constituency created: 1958
- Constituency abolished: 1974
- First contested: 1959
- Last contested: 1969

Kuala Trengganu Selatan was a federal constituency in Terengganu, Malaysia, that was represented in the Dewan Rakyat from 1959 to 1974.

The federal constituency was created in the 1974 redistribution and was mandated to return a single member to the Dewan Rakyat under the first-past-the-post voting system.

== History ==
It was abolished in 1974 when it was redistributed.

=== Representation history ===
Members of Parliament for Kuala Trengganu Selatan
| Parliament | No | Years | Member | Party |
Constituency created from Terengganu Tengah
Parliament of the Federation of Malaya
| 1st | P027 | 1959–1962 | Onn Jaafar (عون جعفر) | Negara |
| 1st | P027 | 1962–1963 | Ismail Kassim (اسماعيل كسسيم) | Alliance (UMNO) |
Parliament of Malaysia
| 1st | P027 | 1963–1964 | Ismail Kassim (اسماعيل كسسيم) | Alliance (UMNO) |
| 2nd | P027 | 1964–1969 | Abdullah Abdul Rahman (عبدالله عبدالرحمن) | Alliance (UMNO) |
| | | 1969–1971 | Parliament was suspended | |
| 3rd | P027 | 1971–1973 | Mohd. Daud Abdul Samad (محمد. داود عبدالصمد) | PMIP |
| 3rd | P027 | 1973–1974 | Mohd. Daud Abdul Samad (محمد. داود عبدالصمد) | BN (PMIP) |
Constituency abolished, split into Ulu Trengganu, Kuala Nerus and Kuala Trengganu

=== State constituency ===
| Parliamentary constituency | State constituency | | | | | | |
| Parliamentary constituency | 1954–1959 | 1959–1974 | 1974–1986 | 1986–1995 | 1995–2004 | 2004–2018 | 2018–present |
|---|---|---|---|---|---|---|---|
| Kuala Trengganu Selatan | | Bandar | | | | | |
| Kuala Trengganu Selatan | | Batu Burok | | | | | |
| Kuala Trengganu Selatan | | Bukit Besar | | | | | |
| Kuala Trengganu Selatan | | Ladang | | | | | |

== Election results ==
Malaysian general election, 1969: Kuala Trengganu Selatan
| Party | Candidate | Votes | % | ∆% |
|---|---|---|---|---|
| PMIP | Mohd. Daud Abdul Samad | 10,790 | 54.44 | ▲43.95 |
| Alliance | Othman Abd. Karim @ Yong | 9,029 | 45.56 | ▼12.33 |
| Total valid votes | | 19,819 | 100.00 | |
| Total rejected ballots | | 1,075 | | |
| Unreturned ballots | | 0 | | |
| Turnout | | 20,894 | 70.93 | ▼2.09 |
| Registered electors | | 29,457 | | |
| Majority | | 1,761 | 8.88 | ▲17.39 |
| PMIP gain from Alliance | | Swing | | ? |

Malaysian general election, 1964: Kuala Trengganu Selatan
| Party | Candidate | Votes | % | ∆% |
|---|---|---|---|---|
| Alliance | Abdullah Abdul Rahman | 9,795 | 57.89 | ▲3.44 |
| National Party | Garieb Abdul Raouf | 5,349 | 31.62 | ▼7.28 |
| PMIP | Mohamed Taib Ismail | 1,775 | 10.49 | ▲3.84 |
| Total valid votes | | 16,919 | 100.00 | |
| Total rejected ballots | | 700 | | |
| Unreturned ballots | | 0 | | |
| Turnout | | 17,619 | 73.02 | ▲5.70 |
| Registered electors | | 24,129 | | |
| Majority | | 4,446 | 26.27 | ▲10.72 |
| Alliance hold | | Swing | | |

Malaysian general by-election, 19 March 1962: Kuala Trengganu Selatan Upon the death of Onn Jaafar
| Party | Candidate | Votes | % | ∆% |
|---|---|---|---|---|
| Alliance | Ismail Kassim | 7,275 | 54.45 | ▲40.23 |
| National Party | Garieb Abdul Raouf | 5,198 | 38.90 | ▼20.88 |
| PMIP | Tengku Shahdan Tengku Abdul Majid | 889 | 6.65 | ▲6.95 |
| Total valid votes | | 13,362 | 100.00 | |
| Total rejected ballots | | 399 | | |
| Unreturned ballots | | 0 | | |
| Turnout | | 13,761 | 67.32 | ▼2.77 |
| Registered electors | | 20,441 | | |
| Majority | | 2,077 | 15.55 | ▼4.01 |
| Alliance gain from National Party | | Swing | | ? |

Malayan general election, 1959: Kuala Trengganu Selatan
| Party | Candidate | Votes | % |
|---|---|---|---|
| National Party | Onn Jaafar | 7,986 | 59.78 |
| Alliance | Engku Muhsein Abdul Kadir | 5,374 | 40.22 |
| Total valid votes | | 13,360 | 100.00 |
| Total rejected ballots | | 131 | |
| Unreturned ballots | | 0 | |
| Turnout | | 13,491 | 70.09 |
| Registered electors | | 19,247 | |
| Majority | | 2,612 | 19.56 |
This was a new constituency created.
