= Alwiyah Talib =

Malaysian politician

Yang Berhormat Puan Hajah Alwiyah Talib JSM PIS II MLA
- عَلْوِيَة طَالِب

Member of the Johor State Legislative Assembly for Endau
- Incumbent
- Assumed office 28 June 2018
- Preceded by: Abd Latif Bandi (BN–UMNO)

Personal details
- Born: 26 September 1961 (age 64) Mersing, Johor, Federation of Malaya
- Party: UMNO (till 2018, since 2026); BERSATU (2018-2026)
- Other political affiliations: Barisan Nasional (till 2018, since 2026); Pakatan Harapan (2018-2020); Perikatan Nasional (2020-2026)
- Occupation: Politician

Alwiyah binti Talib is a Malaysian politician who has served as a Member of Johor State Legislative Assembly for Endau since 2018 after winning it in the 2018 Johor state election on the ticket of UMNO. In 2022 Johor state election, she retained Endau seat after winning it on the ticket of BERSATU.

== Politics ==
On 12 May 2018, she left UMNO and joined BERSATU.

On 30 January 2022, she denied would leave BERSATU. She instead said that her loyalty was still to the party and slammed the allegation, describing it as baseless and damaged her reputation as a loyal party member.

On 4 June 2026, she left BERSATU and rejoined UMNO.

== Election results ==
Johor State Legislative Assembly
Year	Constituency	Candidate	Votes	Pct	Opponent(s)	Votes	Pct	Ballots cast	Majority	Turnout
2018	N32 Endau	Alwiyah Talib (UMNO)	7,136	46.87%	Norul Haszarul Abu Samah (PKR)	4,056	26.64%	15,224	3,030	77.92%
2018	N32 Endau	Alwiyah Talib (UMNO)	7,136	46.87%	Roslan Nikmat (PAS)	3,689	24.23%	15,224	3,030	77.92%
2022	N32 Endau	Alwiyah Talib (BERSATU)	8,433	54.50%	Mohd Youzaimi Yusof (UMNO)	5,392	34.85%	15,474	3,041	55.41%
2022	N32 Endau	Alwiyah Talib (BERSATU)	8,433	54.50%	Mohamad Fakrulrazi Mahmud (AMANAH)	1,154	7.46%	15,474	3,041	55.41%
2022	N32 Endau	Alwiyah Talib (BERSATU)	8,433	54.50%	Mohd Noorhisyam Ibrahim (PEJUANG)	145	0.94%	15,474	3,041	55.41%
2022	N32 Endau	Alwiyah Talib (BERSATU)	8,433	54.50%	Ismail Don (IND)	77	0.50%	15,474	3,041	55.41%
2026	N32 Endau	Alwiyah Talib (UMNO)	9,529	51.62%	Hasnul Hakimi Hussien (PAS)	5,984	32.42%	18,744	3,545	65.16%
2026	N32 Endau	Alwiyah Talib (UMNO)	9,529	51.62%	Saiful Nizam Samat (PKR)	2,552	13.83%	18,744	3,545	65.16%
2026	N32 Endau	Alwiyah Talib (UMNO)	9,529	51.62%	Jati Awang (ASLI)	394	2.13%	18,744	3,545	65.16%

== Honours ==
- Malaysia
  - Companion of the Order of Loyalty to the Crown of Malaysia (JSM) (2021)
- Johor
  - Second Class of the Sultan Ibrahim Medal (PIS II) (2003)
