= Kuala Terengganu (federal constituency) =

Federal constituency of Terengganu, Malaysia

Kuala Terengganu (P036)
Terengganu constituency

Federal constituency
- Legislature: Dewan Rakyat
- MP: Ahmad Amzad Hashim; PN
- Constituency created: 1974
- First contested: 1974
- Last contested: 2023

Demographics
- Population (2020): 129,031
- Electors (2023): 123,575
- Area (km²): 57
- Pop. density (per km²): 2,263.7

Kuala Terengganu is a federal constituency in Kuala Terengganu District, Terengganu, Malaysia, that has been represented in the Dewan Rakyat since 1974.

The federal constituency was created in the 1974 redistribution and is mandated to return a single member to the Dewan Rakyat under the first past the post voting system.

== Demographics ==
Ethnic breakdown of Kuala Terengganu's electorate as of 2022
1. Malay (90.8%)
2. Chinese (8.60%)
3. Indian (0.50%)
4. Other ethnicities (0.20%)
Age breakdown of Kuala Terengganu's electorate as of 2022
1. 18-20 (7.33%)
2. 21-29 (25.2%)
3. 30-39 (26.4%)
4. 40-49 (16.7%)
5. 50-59 (12.0%)
6. 60-69 (7.98%)
7. 70-79 (3.32%)
8. 80-89 (0.93%)
9. above 90 (0.12%)
Gender breakdown of Kuala Terengganu's electorate as of 2022
1. Male (50.0%)
2. Female (49.8%)

== History ==
=== Polling districts ===
According to the federal gazette issued on 18 July 2023, the Kuala Terengganu constituency is divided into 41 polling districts.

State constituency	Polling district	Code	Location
Wakaf Mempelam (N13)	Pulau Rusa	036/13/01	SK Pulau Rusa
Wakaf Mempelam (N13)	Paluh	036/13/02	SK Paloh
Wakaf Mempelam (N13)	Losong Datok Amar	036/13/03	SK Bukit Lasong
Wakaf Mempelam (N13)	Losong Penglima Perang	036/13/04	SK Bukit Lasong
Wakaf Mempelam (N13)	Losong Haji Mat Shafie	036/13/05	SMK Sultan Ahmad
Wakaf Mempelam (N13)	Seberang Baruh	036/13/06	SK Pusat Chabang Tiga
Wakaf Mempelam (N13)	Wakaf Beruas	036/13/07	SMK Bukit Besar
Wakaf Mempelam (N13)	Merbau Patah	036/13/08	SMK Seri Nilam
Wakaf Mempelam (N13)	Durian Burung	036/13/09	SK Durian Burung
Wakaf Mempelam (N13)	Sungai Rengas	036/13/10	SMK Seri Nilam
Wakaf Mempelam (N13)	Wakaf Mempelam	036/13/11	SK Wakaf Mempelam
Wakaf Mempelam (N13)	Kuala Bekah	036/13/12	SK Rengas Bekah
Bandar (N14)	Tok Ku	036/14/01	SK Pusat Chabang Tiga
Bandar (N14)	Cabang Tiga	036/14/02	SK Seri Nilam
Bandar (N14)	Hiliran Masjid	036/14/03	Pusat Pengajian Al-Quran Dan Fardu Ain Yayasan Islam Terengganu
Bandar (N14)	Losong Masjid	036/14/04	SK Losong
Bandar (N14)	Pulau Kambing	036/14/05	SMJK Chung Hwa Wei Sin; Dewan Projek Perumahan Rakyat (PPR) Hiliran
Bandar (N14)	Kampung Cina	036/14/06	Dewan Tunku Abdul Rahman
Bandar (N14)	Banggul	036/14/07	SK Paya Bunga
Bandar (N14)	Paya Bunga	036/14/08	SK Tengku Ampuan Mariam
Bandar (N14)	Tanjung	036/14/09	SMA Sultan Zainal Abidin
Ladang (N15)	Ladang	036/15/01	SK Ladang
Ladang (N15)	Tekukur	036/15/02	SK Sultan Sulaiman 1
Ladang (N15)	Batas Baru	036/15/03	SK Sultan Sulaiman 2
Ladang (N15)	Gong Kapas	036/15/04	SK Gong Kapas
Ladang (N15)	Pasir Panjang	036/15/05	SK Tengku Bariah
Ladang (N15)	Bukit Bayas	036/15/06	SK Bukit Batas
Ladang (N15)	Bukit Besar	036/15/07	SK Pusat Bukit Besar
Ladang (N15)	Gong Gemia	036/15/08	SK Seri Budiman
Batu Buruk (N16)	Pantai Batu Buruk	036/16/01	SMA (Atas) Sultan Zainal Abidin
Batu Buruk (N16)	Nibung	036/16/02	SMK Panji Alam
Batu Buruk (N16)	Gong Tok Nasek	036/16/03	SK Gong Tok Nasek; SMK Padang Negara
Batu Buruk (N16)	Bukit Depu	036/16/04	SMK Dato' Razali Ismail
Batu Buruk (N16)	Kuala Ibai	036/16/05	SMK Sultan Sulaiman
Batu Buruk (N16)	Chendering Pantai	036/16/06	SK Chendering
Batu Buruk (N16)	Chendering	036/16/07	SMK Chendering
Batu Buruk (N16)	Taman Permint Jaya	036/16/08	SK Kubang Ikan
Batu Buruk (N16)	Mengabang Tengah	036/16/09	SMK Seri Budiman
Batu Buruk (N16)	Kolam	036/16/10	SMK Tengku Muhammad Ismail
Batu Buruk (N16)	Kenaga	036/16/11	SK Seri Budiman 2
Batu Buruk (N16)	Tok Adis	036/16/12	SK Pusat Kuala Ibai

=== Representation history ===
Members of Parliament for Kuala Terengganu
Parliament	No	Years	Member	Party	Vote Share
Constituency created from Kuala Trengganu Selatan and Trengganu Tengah
Kuala Trengganu
4th	P032	1974–1978	Mustafa Ali (مصطفى علي)	BN (PAS)	12,296; 58.94%
5th	P032	1978–1982	Abdul Manan Othman (عبدالمانن عثمان)	BN (UMNO)	13,585; 52.14%
6th	P032	1982–1986	Abdul Manan Othman (عبدالمانن عثمان)	BN (UMNO)	18,545; 56.45%
Kuala Terengganu
7th	P033	1986–1990	Zubir Embong (ذوبير امبوڠ)	BN (UMNO)	19,139; 54.75%
8th	P033	1990–1995	Abdul Manan Othman (عبدالمانن عثمان)	S46	21,310; 51.81%
9th	P036	1995–1999	Abu Bakar Daud (ابو بكر داود)	BN (UMNO)	25,620; 55.23%
10th	P036	1999–2004	Syed Azman Syed Ahmad Nawawi (سيد عزمن سيد احمد نووي)	BA (PAS)	31,580; 64.83%
11th	P036	2004–2008	Razali Ismail (غزالي اسماعي)	BN (UMNO)	30,994; 51.61%
12th	P036	2008	Razali Ismail (غزالي اسماعي)	BN (UMNO)	32,562; 49.96%
12th	P036	2009–2013	Mohd Abdul Wahid Endut (محمد عبدالواحد اندوت)	PR (PAS)	32,883; 51.92%
13th	P036	2013–2015	Raja Kamarul Bahrin Shah Raja Ahmad (راج قمر البحرين بن راج احمد）	PR (PAS)	45,828; 56.54%
13th	P036	2015–2018	Raja Kamarul Bahrin Shah Raja Ahmad (راج قمر البحرين بن راج احمد）	AMANAH	45,828; 56.54%
14th	P036	2018–2020	Ahmad Amzad Hashim (احمد عامزد هشيم)	GS (PAS)	42,988; 49.65%
14th	P036	2020–2022	Ahmad Amzad Hashim (احمد عامزد هشيم)	PN (PAS)	42,988; 49.65%
15th	P036	2022–present	Ahmad Amzad Hashim (احمد عامزد هشيم)	PN (PAS)	63,016; 65.27% 68,369 (by-election); 76.41%

=== State constituency ===
Parliamentary constituency	State constituency						
Parliamentary constituency	1954–1959*	1959–1974	1974–1986	1986–1995	1995–2004	2004–2018	2018–present
Kuala Terengganu				Bandar			
Kuala Terengganu				Batu Buruk			
Kuala Terengganu				Ladang			
Kuala Terengganu				Wakaf Mempelam			
Kuala Trengganu			Bandar				
Kuala Trengganu			Batu Burok				
Kuala Trengganu			Ladang				
Kuala Trengganu			Wakaf Mempelam				

=== Historical boundaries ===
State Constituency	Area				
State Constituency	1974	1984	1994	2003	2018
Bandar	Kampung Cina; Kampung Seberang Takir Hulu; Kampung Tok Kaya; Kuala Terengganu; Pulau Kambing	Cabang Tiga; Kampung Losong Haji Su; Kampung Tok Kaya; Kuala Terengganu; Pulau Kambing			Kampung Cina; Kampung Losong Haji Su; Kampung Tok Kaya; Kuala Terengganu; Pulau Kambing
Batu Buruk	Batu Buruk; Chendering; Kampung Mengabang Tengah; Kuala Ibai; Tok Adis				
Ladang	Gong Kapas; Kampung Bukit Besar; Kampung Bukit Kecil; Kampung Pasir Panjang; Ladang				
Wakaf Mempelam	Cabang Tiga; Gong Pauh; Kampung Binjai Berambu; Kampung Kubang Tangga; Kampung Tok Kaya	Durian Burung; Gong Pauh; Kuala Bekah; Pulau Musang; Pulau Rusa		Durian Burung; Kuala Bekah; Pulau Musang; Pulau Rusa; Wakaf Mempelam	Cabang Tiga; Durian Burung; Pulau Musang; Pulau Rusa; Wakaf Mempelam

=== Current state assembly members ===
No.	State Constituency	Member	Coalition (Party)
N13	Wakaf Mempelam	Wan Sukairi Wan Abdullah	PN (PAS)
N14	Bandar	Ahmad Shah Muhamed	PN (PAS)
N15	Ladang	Zuraida Md Noor	PN (PAS)
N16	Batu Buruk	Muhammad Khalil Abdul Hadi	PN (PAS)

=== Local governments & postcode ===
No.	State Constituency	Local Government	Postcode
N13	Wakaf Mempelam	Kuala Terengganu City Council	20000, 20050, 20100, 20200, 20300, 20400, 20500, 20502, 20503, 20506, 20608, 21000, 21080, 21100, 21200 Kuala Terengganu
N14	Bandar	Kuala Terengganu City Council	20000, 20050, 20100, 20200, 20300, 20400, 20500, 20502, 20503, 20506, 20608, 21000, 21080, 21100, 21200 Kuala Terengganu
N15	Ladang	Kuala Terengganu City Council	20000, 20050, 20100, 20200, 20300, 20400, 20500, 20502, 20503, 20506, 20608, 21000, 21080, 21100, 21200 Kuala Terengganu
N16	Batu Buruk	Kuala Terengganu City Council	20000, 20050, 20100, 20200, 20300, 20400, 20500, 20502, 20503, 20506, 20608, 21000, 21080, 21100, 21200 Kuala Terengganu

== Election results ==
Malaysian general by-election, 12 August 2023 Upon the disqualification of the incumbent, Ahmad Amzad Hashim
Party	Candidate	Votes	%	∆%
PAS	Ahmad Amzad Hashim	68,369	76.41	▲11.14
PH	Azan Ismail	21,103	23.59	▲12.25
Total valid votes		89,472	100.00	
Total rejected ballots		1,049		
Unreturned ballots		111		
Turnout		90,632	73.34	▼4.96
Registered electors		123,397		
Majority		47,266	52.82	▲10.45
PAS hold		Swing		
Source(s) https://lom.agc.gov.my/ilims/upload/portal/akta/outputp/1852017/P.U.%20(B)%20376_2023.pdf

Malaysian general election, 2022
Party	Candidate	Votes	%	∆%
PAS	Ahmad Amzad Hashim	63,016	65.27	▲15.62
BN	Mohd Zubir Embong	22,109	22.90	▼9.69
PH	Raja Kamarul Bahrin Shah Raja Ahmad	10,946	11.34	▲11.34
PEJUANG	Mohamad Abu Bakar Muda	481	0.50	▲0.50
Total valid votes		96,552	100.00	
Total rejected ballots		767		
Unreturned ballots		266		
Turnout		97,605	78.30	▼6.43
Registered electors		123,305		
Majority		40,907	42.37	▲25.31
PAS hold		Swing		
Source(s) https://lom.agc.gov.my/ilims/upload/portal/akta/outputp/1753269/PUB608%20PARLIMEN%20TERENGGANU.pdf

Malaysian general election, 2018
Party	Candidate	Votes	%	∆%
PAS	Ahmad Amzad Hashim	42,988	49.65	▼6.89
BN	Wan Nawawi Wan Ismail	28,215	32.59	▼10.65
PKR	Raja Kamarul Bahrin Shah Raja Ahmad	15,380	17.76	▲17.76
Total valid votes		86,583	100.00	
Total rejected ballots		767		
Unreturned ballots		436		
Turnout		87,786	84.73	▼2.26
Registered electors		103,611		
Majority		14,773	17.06	▲3.76
PAS hold		Swing		
Source(s) "His Majesty's Government Gazette - Notice of Contested Election, Parliament for the State of Terengganu [P.U. (B) 235/2018]" (PDF). Attorney General's Chambers of Malaysia. 3 May 2018. "Federal Government Gazette - Results of Contested Election and Statements of the Poll after the Official Addition of Votes, Parliamentary Constituencies for the State of Terengganu [P.U. (B) 309/2018]" (PDF). Attorney General's Chambers of Malaysia. 28 May 2018.

Malaysian general election, 2013
Party	Candidate	Votes	%	∆%
PAS	Raja Kamarul Bahrin Shah Raja Ahmad	45,828	56.54	▲4.62
BN	Mohd Zubir Embong	35,043	43.24	▼4.53
Independent	Maimun Yusuf	182	0.22	▲0.22
Total valid votes		81,053	100.00	
Total rejected ballots		845		
Unreturned ballots		224		
Turnout		82,122	86.99	▲7.09
Registered electors		94,406		
Majority		10,785	13.30	▲9.15
PAS hold		Swing		
Source(s) "Federal Government Gazette - Notice of Contested Election, Parliament for the State of Terengganu [P.U. (B) 172/2013]" (PDF). Attorney General's Chambers of Malaysia. 26 April 2013. "Federal Government Gazette - Results of Contested Election and Statements of the Poll after the Official Addition of Votes, Parliamentary Constituencies for the State of Terengganu [P.U. (B) 213/2013]" (PDF). Attorney General's Chambers of Malaysia. 22 May 2013.

Malaysian general by-election, 17 January 2009 Upon the death of incumbent, Razali Ismail
Party	Candidate	Votes	%	∆%
PAS	Mohd Abdul Wahid Endut	32,883	51.92	▲2.93
BN	Wan Ahmad Farid Wan Salleh	30,252	47.77	▼2.19
Independent	Azharudin Mamat @ Adam	193	0.30	▲0.30
Total valid votes		63,328	100.00	
Total rejected ballots		665		
Unreturned ballots		109		
Turnout		64,102	79.90	▼2.55
Registered electors		80,229		
Majority		2,631	4.15	▲3.18
PAS gain from BN		Swing		?
Source(s) "Pilihan Raya Kecil P.036 Kuala Terengganu". Election Commission of Malaysia. Archived from the original on 2018-09-19.

Malaysian general election, 2008
Party	Candidate	Votes	%	∆%
BN	Razali Ismail	32,562	49.96	▼1.65
PAS	Mohamad Sabu	31,934	48.99	▲0.60
Independent	Maimun Yusuf	685	1.05	▲1.05
Total valid votes		65,181	100.00	
Total rejected ballots		931		
Unreturned ballots		119		
Turnout		66,231	82.45	▼2.09
Registered electors		80,325		
Majority		628	0.97	▼2.25
BN hold		Swing		

Malaysian general election, 2004
Party	Candidate	Votes	%	∆%
BN	Razali Ismail	30,994	51.61	▲16.44
PAS	Syed Azman Syed Ahmad Nawawi	29,061	48.39	▼16.44
Total valid votes		60,055	100.00	
Total rejected ballots		790		
Unreturned ballots		240		
Turnout		61,085	84.54	▲8.03
Registered electors		72,255		
Majority		1,933	3.22	▼26.44
BN gain from PAS		Swing		?

Malaysian general election, 1999
Party	Candidate	Votes	%	∆%
PAS	Syed Azman Syed Ahmad Nawawi	31,580	64.83	▲64.83
BN	Abu Bakar Daud	17,132	35.17	▼20.06
Total valid votes		48,712	100.00	
Total rejected ballots		230		
Unreturned ballots		359		
Turnout		49,301	76.51	▼0.41
Registered electors		64,437		
Majority		14,448	29.66	▲19.20
PAS gain from BN		Swing		?

Malaysian general election, 1995
Party	Candidate	Votes	%	∆%
BN	Abu Bakar Daud	25,620	55.23	▲7.99
S46	Abdul Manan Othman	20,771	44.77	▼7.04
Total valid votes		46,391	100.00	
Total rejected ballots		1,518		
Unreturned ballots		232		
Turnout		48,141	76.92	▼0.45
Registered electors		62,585		
Majority		4,849	10.46	▲5.89
BN gain from S46		Swing		?

Malaysian general election, 1990
Party	Candidate	Votes	%	∆%
S46	Abdul Manan Othman	21,310	51.81	▲51.81
BN	Zubir Embong	19,430	47.24	▼7.50
Independent	Adenan Abd. Rahman	390	0.95	▲0.95
Total valid votes		41,130	100.00	
Total rejected ballots		1,628		
Unreturned ballots		0		
Turnout		42,758	77.37	▲3.47
Registered electors		55,261		
Majority		1,880	4.57	▼4.93
S46 gain from BN		Swing		?

Malaysian general election, 1986
Party	Candidate	Votes	%	∆%
BN	Zubir Embong	19,139	54.75	▼1.70
PAS	Mustafa @ Hassan Ali	15,815	45.25	▲5.44
Total valid votes		34,954	100.00	
Total rejected ballots		978		
Unreturned ballots		0		
Turnout		35,932	73.90	▼3.31
Registered electors		48,622		
Majority		3,324	9.50	▼7.14
BN hold		Swing		

Malaysian general election, 1982: Kuala Trengganu
Party	Candidate	Votes	%	∆%
BN	Abdul Manan Othman	18,545	56.45	▲4.31
PAS	Wan Muttalib Embong	13,078	39.81	▲9.77
Parti Rakyat Malaysia	Syed Shafie Tuan Baharu	1,231	3.75	▼14.07
Total valid votes		32,854	100.00	
Total rejected ballots		1,084		
Unreturned ballots		0		
Turnout		33,938	77.21	▲5.07
Registered electors		43,956		
Majority		5,467	16.64	▼5.46
BN hold		Swing		

Malaysian general election, 1978: Kuala Trengganu
Party	Candidate	Votes	%	∆%
BN	Abdul Manan Othman	13,585	52.14	▼6.80
PAS	Mustafa @ Hassan Ali	7,827	30.04	▲30.04
Parti Rakyat Malaysia	Kassim @ Osman Ahmad	4,644	17.82	▼20.38
Total valid votes		26,056	100.00	
Total rejected ballots		1,001		
Unreturned ballots		0		
Turnout		27,057	72.14	▲3.65
Registered electors		37,504		
Majority		5,758	22.10	▲1.36
BN hold		Swing		

Malaysian general election, 1974: Kuala Trengganu
Party	Candidate	Votes	%
BN	Mustafa @ Hassan Ali	12,296	58.94
Parti Rakyat Malaysia	Kassim @ Osman Ahmad	7,968	38.20
Independent	Mohamed Taib Ismail	597	2.86
Total valid votes		20,861	100.00
Total rejected ballots		1,585	
Unreturned ballots		0	
Turnout		22,446	68.49
Registered electors		32,771	
Majority		4,328	20.74
This was a new constituency created.
