= 1964 Bachok by-election =

← 1964	27 June 1964	1969 →

P019 seat in Dewan Rakyat
	First party	Second party
	PMIP	All
Candidate	Abu Bakar Hamzah	Abdul Ghani Fikri Sulaiman
Party	PMIP	UMNO
Alliance		Alliance
Popular vote	11,900	8,661
Percentage	57.88	42.12
MP before election
Zulkiflee Muhammad
PMIP
Elected MP
Abu Bakar Hamzah
PMIP

The Bachok by-election was a parliamentary by-election that was held on 27 June 1964 in the state of Kelantan, Malaysia. The Bachok seat fell vacant following the death of its PMIP MP and former PMIP deputy president, Shafie Ahmad on 7 February 1968 due to road accident. He won the seat in 1964 Malaysian general election with a majority of 4,381 votes.

Abu Bakar Hamzah of PMIP, retained the seat, defeating Abdul Ghani Fikri Sulaiman of Alliance with a reduced majority of 3,239 votes.

== Nomination ==
Prior nomination day, Nik Hussain Nik Zainal, former Parti Negara Kelantan chairmen denied he will be contesting the seat under Alliance banner.

On nomination day, two candidates were confirmed. Alliance nominated UMNO field publicity officer, Abdul Ghani Fikri Sulaiman. PMIP nominated PMIP central committee member, Abu Bakar Hamzah.

== Results ==
Malaysian general by-election, 27 June 1964: Bachok Upon the death of incumbent, Zulkiflee Muhammad
Party	Candidate	Votes	%	∆%
PMIP	Abu Bakar Hamzah	11,900	57.88	▼2.58
Alliance	Abdul Ghani Fikri Sulaiman	8,661	42.12	▲2.58
Total valid votes		20,561	100.00	
Total rejected ballots				
Unreturned ballots				
Turnout				
Registered electors				
Majority		3,239	15.76	▼5.16
PMIP hold		Swing		
