= Jacqueline Pascarl =

Australian author and television personality

Jacqueline Pascarl (born 5 July 1963), formerly known as Jacqueline Gillespie and Jacqueline Pascarl-Gillespie, is an Australian author, TV personality and parents' rights advocate and humanitarian aid worker. Pascarl came to public attention in 1992, when her children were covertly removed from Australia, illegally under Australian law, by their Malaysian father. One man was convicted, sentenced and then jailed as an accomplice. The Parliament of Australia characterised this removal as an "abduction."

== Biography ==
She was a young ballet dancer in 1980 when she met a Malaysian prince Datuk Raja Kamarul Bahrin Shah Raja Ahmad who was in Melbourne studying architecture. They married in 1981, when she was 17, and moved to Terengganu the following year, where Raja Bahrin was a junior member of the that sultanate. They had two children. Raja Bahrin later took a second wife under Islamic marital law. By this time, Jacqueline claims the marriage had turned violent. She returned to Australia in 1985 with their children to visit her sick grandmother, and never returned.

The couple divorced in 1986. Bahrin signed over custody of their two children, an arrangement which was later ratified by the Family Court of Australia. In 1990, she married TV journalist Iain Gillespie. They legally separated in the mid 1990s and formally divorced in 2000. Pascarl married Bill Crocaris in 2002. She and Crocaris have two children. They divorced in 2012. Pascarl is married to a dental surgeon and lives with their children in Melbourne where she continues to run humanitarian agency Operation Angel being active during the 2020 bushfire emergency and other war and natural disasters and remains active in her community.

== Career ==
A feature reporter for the Ten Network at the time of the abduction, Pascarl went on to research and produce several television documentary films, including the award-winning Empty Arms, Broken Hearts, covering the topic of international parental abduction of children. She was the host of the television lifestyle show House Hunt, but she was drawn into the area of child literacy, leaving her television and radio career behind. She became an international lobbyist on the rights of the child, and an expert on parental child abduction and the Hague Convention on the Civil Aspects of International Child Abduction.

Pascarl established Operation Book Power in 1995, a child literacy project in Kenya and South Africa. In 1998, she was appointed Special Ambassador for the international development and aid agency, CARE International and worked as an emergency aid worker in the conflict zones of Bosnia, Kosovo and East Timor. She was based in Europe, leaving Australia after citing privacy issues. She has garnered several humanitarian awards including commendations for child protection from the National Center for Missing and Exploited Children (USA) and the United Nations. She founded Operation Angel, founded with the aim of restoring dignity to women and children in war torn countries but now involved in disaster relief on a broader basis, recently the destructive Black Saturday bushfires. The group has recently organised to assist Queenslanders in January 2011 in flood relief.

She has written two memoirs, Once I was a Princess and Since I Was a Princess (2007). She lectures internationally and advises the European Union and the US State Department and represents Australia at world forums on child abduction issues. She is a consultant to the Australian Department of Foreign Affairs and Trade, and has recently been appointed as a Patron of CARE International in the United Kingdom.

In 2009, Pascarl became a regular columnist for the Sunday Times Magazine in the UK and writes for ThePunch.com.au. She also produces documentary and television films through Creswick Creative. 2011 saw her appointment as ambassador to the 14th Dalai Lama in Australia, and her being awarded the Queensland Disaster Hero Medal 2011 for her work through Operation Angel during the 2010–11 Queensland floods for which she raised and distributed over $5 million worth of material aid to Queenslanders in need. That same year she was awarded the Humanitarian Overseas Service Medal. Appointed by the Australia Government, Pascarl served for several years as National Vice Chair of the Australian Defence Force Reserves, Defence Reserves Support Council, being the first woman to serve on the National Executive. She oversaw Army, Navy and Air Force. As well as sitting on several boards from ANVAM to the Governing Board of International Social Services in Geneva, Switzerland. Jacqueline Pascarl was issued with Letters Patent by the Governor General of Australia when she received the Order of Australia on behalf of HM Queen Elizabeth in 2022. She is now styled Jacqueline Pascarl OAM. She is an Independent Director and Trustee of national charity, RSL Australia, the peak body representing Defence Force Veterans in Australia.

== Paternal abduction ==
In 1992, Raja Bahrin came to Melbourne for a pre-arranged custody visit, after which he failed to return the children. After some days of uncertainty of his and the children's whereabouts, Raja Bahrin surfaced with them back in Malaysia. He appeared in an interview on television, but refused to say how he had managed to smuggle them out of Australia, saying only it was the "will of Allah".

It was later revealed that with the help of an accomplice, Bryan Wickham, he had taken them by car to Weipa in Australia's far north, and by boat from the Cape York Peninsula to Merauke, in the Indonesian province of Irian Jaya. From there he took them to Malaysia via Sulawesi, where the authorities retrospectively awarded him custody, and the children were then settled with their father in Terengganu. Wickham spent one year planning the abduction, arranging vehicles and a boat, studying the escape route. Wickham later served nine months in an Australian jail for his part. Malaysia is not a party to the Hague Convention, which recognises custody by the habitual residence of minor children, and so the Convention could not be used to return the children to Australia.

Some controversy surrounded Pascarl soon after the abduction, as she successfully applied to the Australian Family Court to prevent the content of any interview with her children from appearing in the Australian media, the Courts deeming published interviews to be detrimental to the children and contrary to their future reintroduction into Australian society. The Herald and Weekly Times Ltd unsuccessfully appealed the decision. Ray Martin of 60 Minutes had travelled to Malaysia and interviewed the prince and his family there, and while footage of the children appeared on television, what was said by the children was not broadcast in Australia.

== Reunited ==
Despite the fact the Prince had softened his stance in recent years and stated that his children could see their mother sometime after they turned eighteen, Pascarl did not see her children again until 2006 when her twenty-year-old daughter Shahirah (now known simply as Shah) visited her in Melbourne. In August 2006, her son Iddin, now 23, returned to Australia to visit his mother after fourteen years of separation.." Upon the return of his wife's abducted daughter Shah in 2006, her husband Bill was the spokesperson for his wife to the media pack that had formed outside of their house. Jacqueline is now in contact with her children most days.

== Other sources ==
- Jacqueline Pascarl-Gillespie, Once I was a Princess (Pan Macmillan, 1995) ISBN 0-7329-0815-9
- Jacqueline Pascarl, Since I was a Princess (Harper Collins, 2007) ISBN 978-0-7322-8322-3
