= 1985 Ulu Padas by-election =

Election in Malaysia

- 11-12 October 1985

Ulu Padas seat in the Dewan Rakyat
	PBS	BN
Candidate	Kadoh Agundong	Jinuin Jimin
Party	PBS	BN (BERJAYA)
Popular vote	7,196	4,934
Percentage	59.32%	40.68%
Ulu Padas MP before election
Harris Salleh
BN (BERJAYA)
Elected Ulu Padas MP
Kadoh Agundong
PBS

The 1985 Ulu Padas by-election is a by-election for the Dewan Rakyat seat of Ulu Padas in Sabah, Malaysia that were held on 11 and 12 October 1985. It was called following the resignation of the incumbent, Harris Salleh on 17 August 1985.

== Background ==
Harris Salleh were first elected in the Sabah Assembly in the 1967 Sabah state election, winning the Sipitang-Ulu Padas state seat as a United Sabah National Organization (USNO) candidate. He later won the Labuan seat uncontested in the 1971 Sabah state election, although he lost the seat in a by-election in 1975 prompted by his exit from USNO. With several disgruntled USNO members who also exits the party, they formed Sabah People's United Front (BERJAYA) and Harris would become its Deputy President. BERJAYA would win the 1976 Sabah state election from USNO months later, with Harris winning Tenom seat. Only months after the election, Harris would succeed Fuad Stephens as both party president and Chief Minister of Sabah, after the latter's demise with several state ministers in a helicopter crash on 6 June 1976. A year later in 1977, Harris would also win Keningau federal seat in a by-election. Harris later would contest and win the Ulu Padas federal seat in the 1978 Malaysian general election uncontested. Under Harris leadership, BERJAYA would win the 1981 Sabah state election with a bigger majority than the 1976 election. Harris would also successfully defend his Ulu Padas federal seat a year later in the 1982 Malaysian general election.

However, in 1984, several disgruntled members of the party dissatisfied with Harris' leadership exits BERJAYA, including its vice-president Joseph Pairin Kitingan, and formed United Sabah Party/Parti Bersatu Sabah (PBS). The 1985 Sabah state election, called by Harris earlier than the scheduled 1986 expiry of the state assembly, saw PBS won the election by a slim margin of 25 seats, with BERJAYA reduced to only 7 state seats and Harris lost his Tenom seat. After the disastrous defeat, Harris resigns as president of the party, with Mohammad Noor Mansoor, the party's secretary general, elected by the party to replace Harris as the new president of BERJAYA.

On 17 August 1985, Harris announced his resignation from BERJAYA and also his resignation of his federal seat in Ulu Padas. Harris said that his resignation were prompted by attacks on his leadership in the party after the comprehensive defeat of BERJAYA to PBS, 3 months earlier. Election Commission of Malaysia (SPR) has set 11 and 12 October 1985 as the election day, with 19 September 1985 as the nomination day.

== Nomination and campaign ==
Even before election and nomination date for the by-election had been announced, PBS, BERJAYA and USNO, the three main Sabah political parties have declared their interest in contesting the seat. But USNO pulled out at the last minute and threw their support behind BERJAYA, which is under federal coalition Barisan Nasional (BN). On the nomination day, it was confirmed PBS will face BERJAYA in a straight fight, with BERJAYA contesting under BN's logo and name.

PBS nominated Kadoh Agundong, vice-president of PBS, the state housing and local government minister, and assemblyman for Tenom, which he won from Harris in the 1985 state election. BERJAYA meanwhile nominated newcomer Jinuin Jimin, an economics graduate from Australian National University.

The campaign mainly focused on BERJAYA claiming PBS's failure to implement its promises after winning the state election, and PBS' rebuttal of the claim saying they need more time and funds to undo BERJAYA's mistake while they governed the state. The campaigning period is also held at the backdrop of USNO's court case against PBS centered on legitimacy of Joseph Pairin Kitingan as the Chief Minister of Sabah. Observers saw the contest also between non-Muslim Bumiputera-led PBS against Muslim Bumiputera-led BERJAYA, with another Muslim Bumiputera-led USNO supporting BERJAYA's campaign. They also predicted PBS would win in the non-Muslim Bumiputera majority seat.

== Timeline ==
The key dates are listed below.

Date	Event
	Issue of the Writ of Election
19 September 1985	Nomination Day
19 September - 10 October 1985	Campaigning Period
	Early polling day for postal and overseas voters
11-12 October 1985	Polling Day

== Results ==
Malaysian general by-election, 11–12 October 1985: Ulu Padas Upon the resignation of incumbent, Harris Salleh
Party	Candidate	Votes	%	∆%
PBS	Kadoh Agundong	7,196	59.32	▲59.32
BN	Jinuin Jimin	4,934	40.68	▼32.13
Total valid votes		12,130	100.00	
Total rejected ballots				
Unreturned ballots				
Turnout				
Registered electors				
Majority		2,262	18.64	▼32.24
PBS gain from BN		Swing	N/A	

=== Previous results ===
Malaysian general election, 1982: Ulu Padas
Party	Candidate	Votes	%	∆%
BN	Harris Salleh	8,252	72.81	▲72.81
Independent	Halik Zaman	2,486	21.93	▲21.93
PAS	Jamparon Laja	425	3.75	▲3.75
Independent	Lawrence Liki	171	1.51	▲1.51
Total valid votes		11,334	100.00	
Total rejected ballots		261		
Unreturned ballots		0		
Turnout		11,595	73.22	
Registered electors		15,835		
Majority		5,766	50.88	
BN hold		Swing		

== Aftermath ==
After PBS win, party president and Sabah Chief Minister Joseph Pairin Kitingan said that all people should accept the mandate given to the party, a message that observer implied that Joseph shows PBS has more support from the Sabah people than BERJAYA or USNO in governing the state. Observers also saw the win strengthen's PBS application to join BN, which PBS applied after their state election win but were yet approved by BN, with BERJAYA still in BN.

Kadoh and Jinuin would contest the seat again in 1986 Malaysian general election, now renamed as Padas, with Kadoh won again. By then PBS would be contesting under BN's banner, their application to join the coalition finally approved after their win in the state snap election of 1986, and BERJAYA contesting on their own after exiting BN days before the general election.
