= 1974 Rajang by-election =

- 4 January 1974 till 12 January 1974

P145 seat in the Dewan Rakyat
- Turnout: 53.86%
	First party	Second party
	SUPP	SNAP
Candidate	Jawan Empaling	Sandah Ak Penghulu Jarau
Party	SUPP	SNAP
Popular vote	3,591	3,267
Percentage	54.74%	45.26%
MP before election
Tibouh Rantai
SUPP
Elected MP
Jawan Empaling
SUPP

The Rajang by-election was a parliamentary by-election which took place between 7 January 1974 to 12 January 1974 in the state of Sarawak, Malaysia. The Rajang seat fell vacant following the death of its member of parliament Mr. Tibuoh Rantai of Sarawak United Peoples' Party in Sarawak. Tibuoh won the seat in 1969 Malaysian general election against six other candidates with majority of 1,621.

Jawan Empaling of SUPP won the by-election, defeating Sandah Jarau of SNAP by a margin of 684 votes. The constituency had 13,796 voters in total.

== Results ==
Candidate	Party	Votes	%
Jawan Empaling	Sarawak United Peoples' Party	3,951	54.74
Sandah Jarau	Sarawak National Party	3,267	45.26
Total		7,218	100.00
Valid votes		7,218	97.15
Invalid/blank votes		212	2.85
Total votes		7,430	100.00
Registered voters/turnout		13,796	53.86
Majority		684	
SUPP hold			
Source: Official Year Book
