= Ahmad Amzad Hashim =

Malaysian politician

Yang Berhormat Datuk Ahmad Amzad Hashim PMW SMZ MP
- أحمد امزاد هاشم
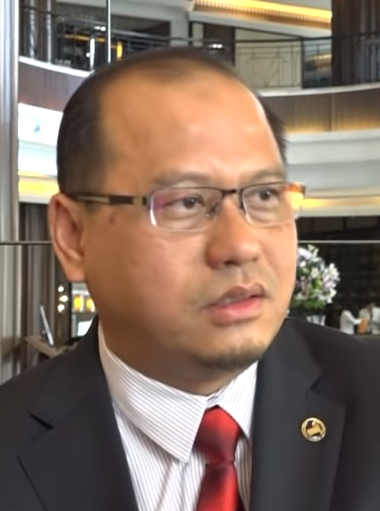

Deputy Minister of Science, Technology and Innovation
- In office 30 August 2021 – 24 November 2022
- Monarch: Abdullah
- Prime Minister: Ismail Sabri Yaakob
- Minister: Adham Baba
- Preceded by: Himself
- Succeeded by: Arthur Joseph Kurup
- Constituency: Kuala Terengganu
- In office 10 March 2020 – 16 August 2021
- Monarch: Abdullah
- Prime Minister: Muhyiddin Yassin
- Minister: Khairy Jamaluddin
- Preceded by: Isnaraissah Munirah Majilis (Deputy Minister of Energy, Science, Technology, Environment and Climate Change)
- Succeeded by: Himself
- Constituency: Kuala Terengganu

Member of the Malaysian Parliament for Kuala Terengganu
- Incumbent
- Assumed office 12 August 2023
- Preceded by: Himself (PN–PAS)
- Majority: 47,266 (2023)
- In office 9 May 2018 – 27 June 2023
- Preceded by: Raja Kamarul Bahrin (PR–PAS)
- Succeeded by: Himself (PN–PAS)
- Majority: 14,773 (2018); 40,907 (2022)

Faction represented in Dewan Rakyat
- 2018–2020: Malaysian Islamic Party
- 2020–: Perikatan Nasional

Personal details
- Born: Ahmad Amzad bin Hashim; 15 January 1970 (age 56) Sultanah Nur Zahirah Hospital, Kuala Terengganu, Terengganu, Malaysia
- Citizenship: Malaysian
- Party: Malaysian Islamic Party (PAS)
- Other political affiliations: Perikatan Nasional (PN); Muafakat Nasional (MN); Gagasan Sejahtera (GS)
- Education: Universiti Kebangsaan Malaysia
- Occupation: Politician

Ahmad Amzad bin Hashim (Jawi أحمد امزاد بن هاشم; born 15 January 1970) is a Malaysian politician who has served as the Member of Parliament (MP) for Kuala Terengganu from May 2018 to June 2023 and again since August 2023. He served as the Deputy Minister of Science, Technology and Innovation for the second term in the Barisan Nasional (BN) administration under former Prime Minister Ismail Sabri Yaakob and former Minister Adham Baba from August 2021 to the collapse of the BN administration in November 2022 and the first term in Perikatan Nasional (PN) administration under former Prime Minister Muhyiddin Yassin and former Minister Khairy Jamaluddin from March 2020 to the collapse of the PN administration in August 2021. He is a member of the Malaysian Islamic Party (PAS), a component party of the PN coalition.

== Background ==
He was born on 15 January 1970, at Kuala Terengganu General Hospital (HBKT).

He received his education at Sekolah Menengah Sains Sultan Mahmud (SESMA), an elite school at the time in Terengganu and a graduate of accounting in Universiti Kebangsaan Malaysia.

== Career ==
Upon completing his studies, he established his name in the field of shipping with MSET Shipbuilding Corporation SDN. BHD as the managing director from 1995 to 2004, raising the name of the company to the name of Southeast Asia.

== Political career ==
=== Member of Parliament (since 2018) ===
In the 2018 general election, Ahmad Amzad made his electoral debut after being nominated by GS to contest for the Kuala Terengganu federal seat. He won the seat and was elected to Parliament as the Kuala Terengganu MP for the first term after defeating Wan Nawawi Wan Ismail of Barisan Nasional (BN) and Raja Kamarul Bahrin of Pakatan Harapan (PH) by a majority of 14,773 votes.

In the 2022 general election, Ahmad Amzad was renominated by PN to defend the Kuala Terengganu seat. He defended the seat and was reelected to Parliament as the Kuala Terengganu MP for the second term after defeating Mohd Zubir Embong of BN, Raja Kamarul of PH and Mohamad Abu Bakar Muda of the Homeland Fighters Party (PEJUANG) by a majority of 40,907 votes.

On 27 June 2023, the Terengganu Election Court annulled the results of the Kuala Terengganu seat in the 2022 general election. With this, Ahmad Amzad lost his seat and was disqualified as an MP with immediate effect. Judge Mohd Firuz Jaffril ruled that the petitioner and the BN candidate in the election Mohd Zubir succeeded in proving that corruption had taken place with the aim of influencing voters in the election. He added that although Mohd Zubir was not presented as a witness, other evidence was sufficient to declare the results null and void. The court also ordered Ahmad Amzad to pay RM50,000 to Mohd Zubir and allowed Ahmad Amzad to file an appeal within 14 days. Ahmad Amzad was represented by lawyer Wan Rohimi Wan Daud while Mohd Zubir was by lawyer Mohd Hafarizam Harun. Wan Rohimi stressed that they would file a notice of appeal to the Federal Court. However on 8 July 2023, Wan Rohimi announced that Ahmad Amzad and PAS had decided not to do so and hoped that the by-election triggered by the decision would be held simultaneously with the state elections on 12 August 2023. On 27 July 2023, State Commissioner of PAS of Terengganu Husain Awang announced that PN would renominate Ahmad Amzad to defend the seat again. On the nomination day on 29 July 2023, Ahmad Amzad was officially nominated as the candidate for the seat in the by-election.

In the by-election, Ahmad Amzad regained the seat and was reelected to Parliament as the Kuala Terengganu MP for the third term after defeating Azan Ismail of PH by an increased majority of 47,266 votes.

=== Deputy Minister of Science, Technology and Innovation (2020–2022) ===
On 10 March 2020, Prime Minister Muhyiddin appointed Ahmad Amzad to serve in his PN administration as the Deputy Minister of Science, Technology and Innovation for the first term, deputising for Minister Khairy.

On 16 August 2021, Ahmad Amzad lost his position as the PN administration collapsed after Muhyiddin resigned as Prime Minister due to his loss of majority parliamentary support.

On 30 August 2021, Prime Minister Ismail Sabri reappointed Ahmad Amzad to serve in his BN administration as the Deputy Minister of Science, Technology and Innovation for the second term, deputising for Minister Adham.

On 24 November 2022, Ahmad Amzad lost his position again as the BN administration collapsed after Anwar Ibrahim was appointed as the Prime Minister to lead the PH administration as a result of the 2022 general election.

== Personal life ==
He was previously married to Suriati Abidin in 1991 and their marriage lasted 25 years. On 12 February 2016, Hajah Suriati died from pancreatic cancer. He later remarried Dr. Nur Diana Ahmad Takri in 2017 and he is a father of nine children.

== Election results ==
Parliament of Malaysia
Year	Constituency	Candidate	Votes	Pct	Opponent(s)	Votes	Pct	Ballots cast	Majority	Turnout
2018	P036 Kuala Terengganu	Ahmad Amzad Hashim (PAS)	42,988	49.65%	Wan Nawawi Wan Ismail (UMNO)	28,215	32.59%	87,786	14,773	84.73%
2018	P036 Kuala Terengganu	Ahmad Amzad Hashim (PAS)	42,988	49.65%	Raja Kamarul Bahrin Shah (AMANAH)	15,380	17.76%	87,786	14,773	84.73%
2022	P036 Kuala Terengganu	Ahmad Amzad Hashim (PAS)	63,016	65.27%	Mohd Zubir Embong (UMNO)	22,109	22.90%	96,552	40,907	78.30%
2022	P036 Kuala Terengganu	Ahmad Amzad Hashim (PAS)	63,016	65.27%	Raja Kamarul Bahrin Shah (AMANAH)	10,946	11.34%	96,552	40,907	78.30%
2022	P036 Kuala Terengganu	Ahmad Amzad Hashim (PAS)	63,016	65.27%	Mohamad Abu Bakar Muda (PUTRA)	481	0.50%	96,552	40,907	78.30%
2023	P036 Kuala Terengganu	Ahmad Amzad Hashim (PAS)	68,369	76.41%	Azan Ismail (PKR)	21,103	23.59%	89,472	47,266	72.40%

== Honours ==
=== Honours of Malaysia ===
- Malaysia
  - Recipient of the 17th Yang di-Pertuan Agong Installation Medal (2024)
- Federal Territory (Malaysia)
  - Commander of the Order of the Territorial Crown (PMW) – Datuk (2021)
- Terengganu
  - Companion of the Order of Sultan Mizan Zainal Abidin of Terengganu (SMZ) (2024)
