= Raja Kamarul Bahrin =

Malaysian politician

Yang Mulia Raja Dato' Kamarul Bahrin Shah Ahmad Baharuddin Ismail Shah DPMT DSAP
- راج قمر البحرين شاه راج أحمد بحرالدّين شاه

Deputy Deputy Minister of Housing and Local Government (Malaysia)
- In office 17 July 2018 – 24 February 2020
- Monarchs: Muhammad V of Kelantan (2018–2019); Abdullah of Pahang (2019–2020)
- Prime Minister: Mahathir Mohamad
- Minister: Zuraida Kamaruddin
- Preceded by: Halimah Mohamed Sadique (Deputy Minister of Housing, Local Government and Urban Wellbeing)
- Succeeded by: Ismail Muttalib
- Constituency: Senator

Senator Appointed by the Yang di-Pertuan Agong
- In office 17 July 2018 – 16 July 2021
- Monarchs: Muhammad V (2018–2019); Abdullah (2019–2021)
- Prime Minister: Mahathir Mohamad (2018–2020); Muhyiddin Yassin (2020–2021)

Member of the Malaysian Parliament for Kuala Terengganu
- In office 5 May 2013 – 9 May 2018
- Preceded by: Mohd Abdul Wahid Endut (PR–PAS)
- Succeeded by: GS PAS Ahmad Amzad Hashim
- Majority: 10,785 (2013)

Chairman of Pakatan Harapan State of Terengganu
- In office 30 August 2017 – 23 November 2024
- President: Wan Azizah Wan Ismail
- Deputy: 0
- National Chairman: Mahathir Mohamad (2017–2020); Anwar Ibrahim (since 2020)
- Preceded by: Position established
- Succeeded by: Mohd Hasbie Muda

Faction represented in Dewan Negara
- 2018–2021: Pakatan Harapan

Faction represented in Dewan Rakyat
- 2013–2015: Malaysian Islamic Party
- 2015–2018: National Trust Party (Malaysia) National Trust Party PAN-M

Personal details
- Born: Raja Kamarul Bahrin Shah bin Raja Ahmad Baharuddin Ismail Shah ibni Raja Bendahara Abdul Rashid Shah ibni Sultan Haji Sir Idris Murshidul Azzam Shah I 14 January 1955 (age 71) Istana Maziah, Kuala Terengganu, Federation of Malaya (now Malaysia)
- Citizenship: Malaysia
- Party: Malaysian Islamic Party (PAS) (2013–2015); National Trust Party (Malaysia) (AMANAH) (since 2015)
- Other political affiliations: Pakatan Rakyat (PR)(2013–2015); Pakatan Harapan (PH) (since 2015)
- Education: University of Melbourne
- Occupation: Politician
- Profession: Architect
- Raja Kamarul Bahrin on Facebook; Raja Kamarul Bahrin on Parliament of Malaysia

Raja Datuk Ir Haji Sir Kamarul Bahrin Shah bin Raja Ahmad Baharuddin Ismail Shah (Jawi: راج قمر البحرين شاه بن راج أحمد بحرالدّين شاه born 14 January 1955) is a Malaysians.

Malaysian politician who served as the Deputy Minister of Housing and Local Government (Malaysia) Minister of Housing and Local Government in the Pakatan Harapan (PH) administration under former Prime Minister Mahathir Mohamad and former Minister Zuraida Kamaruddin from July 2018 to the collapse of the PH administration in February 2020 and as a Senator from July 2018 to July 2021 as well as the Member of Parliament (MP) for Kuala Terengganu from May 2013 to May 2018. He is a member of the National Trust Party (AMANAH), a component party of the PH coalition. He served as the State Chairman of PH and AMANAH of Terengganu from 2017 to 2024.

He also served as Chairman of the Hotel Association of Malaysia (MAH) and member of the Badan Warisan Malaysia. He was also one of the leader of Angkatan Amanah Merdeka, a defunct Non-Governmental Organisations (NGOs) led by Tengku Razaleigh Hamzah.

== Early life and education ==
Raja Kamarul Bahrin was born on 14 January 1955 at Istana Maziah, Kuala Terengganu. After getting an early education at Saint John Institute, he returned to Terengganu and attended Sultan Sulaiman Secondary School (appointed as Head of Student in 1974) before pursuing his tertiary education at the University of Melbourne.

== Career as architect ==
Raja Kamarul Bahrin is an architect who is well known for his traditional Malay-based architecture. He is popularly known as the architect of the Tengku Tengah Zaharah Mosque or better known as the Floating Mosque, the Terengganu State Museum (Museum recognised as the largest museum in Asia), Istana Melawati (Putrajaya) and several others.

== Politics ==
Raja Kamarul Bahrin joined the Malaysian Islamic Party (PAS) after he agreed to the plea by Abdul Hadi Awang, the party Terengganu state Commissioner. He was picked as the party candidate for the Kuala Terengganu federal seat for the 2013 general election on 9 April 2013 and subsequently won. He was committed to representing the voices of professionals who were ignored by the administration of the BN government and hoped his participation in politics would force the authorities to respect the views and professional society opinions more seriously.

On 21 August 2015, he was declared the chairman of the Terengganu's Gerakan Harapan Baru. On 16 September 2015, he left PAS and joined the National Trust Party (AMANAH) after the party was set up.

== Personal life ==
In 1981, Raja Kamarul Bahrin married Jacqueline Pascarl. She was an Australian young ballet dancer then and later became a writer. They had two children, Shahirah Bahrin and Mohammed Baharuddin. Raja Bahrin later took a second wife under Islamic marital law. They divorced in 1986.

He then married a Singaporean artist and had four children, Raja Badruddin Hakim, Raja Bahiuddin Ansari, Raja Aryani Munirah and Raja Salihah Nazirah.

== Controversies ==
=== Child dispute with ex-wife ===
In 1986, Raja Kamarul Bahrin divorced Jacqueline Pascarl, an Australian citizen. He signed over custody of their two children, Shahirah Bahrin and Mohammed Baharuddin, an arrangement which was later ratified by the Family Court of Australia. He later tried to seek custody of his children in 1992 through the Australian Family Court.

In 1992, Raja Bahrin came to Melbourne for a pre-arranged custody visit, after which he failed to return the children. After some days of uncertainty of his and the children's whereabouts, Raja Bahrin surfaced with them back in Malaysia. He appeared in an interview on television, but refused to say how he had managed to smuggle them out of the Australia. The events are all recorded and have been recorded with the title 'Raja Bahrin Story' (1997).

In 2006, Shahirah Bahrin and Mohammed Baharuddin were reunited with their mother in Melbourne, after 14 years apart.

=== Collapse of Sultan Mizan Zainal Abidin Stadium ===
Raja Kamarul Bahrin is an architect in Malaysia. His company, Senibahri Arkitek, designed the Sultan Mizan Zainal Abidin Stadium in Terengganu, which collapsed twice: first in 2009, then again in 2013.

== Election results ==
Parliament of Malaysia
Year	Constituency	Candidate	Votes	Pct	Opponent(s)	Votes	Pct	Ballots cast	Majority	Turnout
2013	P036 Kuala Terengganu	Raja Kamarul Bahrin Shah (PAS)	45,828	55.80%	Mohd Zubir Embong (UMNO)	35,043	42.67%	82,122	10,785	87.00%
2013	P036 Kuala Terengganu	Raja Kamarul Bahrin Shah (PAS)	45,828	55.80%	Maimun Yusuf (IND)	182	0.22%	82,122	10,785	87.00%
2018	P036 Kuala Terengganu	Raja Kamarul Bahrin Shah (AMANAH)	15,380	17.76%	Ahmad Amzad Hashim (PAS)	42,988	49.65%	87,786	14,773	84.73%
2018	P036 Kuala Terengganu	Raja Kamarul Bahrin Shah (AMANAH)	15,380	17.76%	Wan Nawawi Wan Ismail (UMNO)	28,215	32.59%	87,786	14,773	84.73%
2022	P036 Kuala Terengganu	Raja Kamarul Bahrin Shah (AMANAH)	10,946	11.34%	Ahmad Amzad Hashim (PAS)	63,016	65.27%	97,605	40,907	78.30%
2022	P036 Kuala Terengganu	Raja Kamarul Bahrin Shah (AMANAH)	10,946	11.34%	Mohd Zubir Embong (UMNO)	22,109	22.90%	97,605	40,907	78.30%
2022	P036 Kuala Terengganu	Raja Kamarul Bahrin Shah (AMANAH)	10,946	11.34%	Mohamad Abu Bakar Muda (PUTRA)	481	0.50%	97,605	40,907	78.30%

Terengganu State Legislative Assembly
Year	Constituency	Candidate	Votes	Pct	Opponent(s)	Votes	Pct	Ballots cast	Majority	Turnout
2018	N16 Batu Buruk	Raja Kamarul Bahrin (AMANAH)	2,572	9.30%	Muhammad Khalil Abdul Hadi (PAS)	15,184	54.91%	27,989	5,288	85.60%
2018	N16 Batu Buruk	Raja Kamarul Bahrin (AMANAH)	2,572	9.30%	Zamri Awang Hitam (UMNO)	9,896	35.79%	27,989	5,288	85.60%

== Honours ==
- Pahang
  - Knight Companion of the Order of Sultan Ahmad Shah of Pahang (DSAP) – Dato' (2023)
- Terengganu
  - Knight Commander of the Order of the Crown of Terengganu (DPMT) – Dato' (1994)

== See also ==
- Members of the Dewan Negara, 14th Malaysian Parliament
- List of people who have served in both Houses of the Malaysian Parliament
