= 1980 Mukah by-election =

← 1979	21 February 1980	1982 →

P146 Mukah seat in the Dewan Rakyat
	First party
	BN
Candidate	Edwin Esnen Unang
Party	UMNO
Alliance	BN
Popular vote	Won uncontested
Percentage	Won uncontested
MP before election
Salleh Jafaruddin
BN (PBB)
Elected MP
Edwin Esnen Unang
BN (PBB)

The 1980 Mukah by-election was a by-election that was scheduled to be held on 21 February 1980 for the Dewan Rakyat seat of Mukah. It was called following the resignation of its member of parliament Salleh Jafaruddin on 24 December 1979. Salleh won the seat on 1978 Malaysian general election.

Edwin Esnen Unang, of Barisan Nasional won the by election uncontested, as he was the sole nominee during nomination day on 28 January 1980.

== Nomination ==
By the end of nomination day, Edwin won as being the sole candidate.

== Results ==
Malaysian general by-election, 21 February 1980: Mukah Upon the resignation of incumbent, Salleh Jafaruddin
Party	Candidate	Votes	%	∆%
On the nomination day, Edwin Esnen Unang won uncontested.
BN	Edwin Esnen Unang			
Total valid votes			100.00	
Total rejected ballots				
Unreturned ballots				
Turnout				
Registered electors				
Majority				
BN hold		Swing		
