= 1996 Lipis by-election =

Election in Malaysia

- Not contested (scheduled on 27 January 1996)

Lipis seat in the Dewan Rakyat
| | BN |
| Candidate | Amihamzah Ahmad |
| Party | BN (UMNO) |
| Popular vote | N/A |
| Percentage | N/A |
Lipis MP before election
Abu Dahari Osman
BN (UMNO)
Elected Lipis MP
Amihamzah Ahmad
BN (UMNO)

The 1996 Lipis by-election is a by-election for the Dewan Rakyat federal seat of Lipis, Malaysia that were scheduled to be held on 27 January 1996. It was called following the death of the incumbent, Abu Dahari Osman on 29 December 1995.

== Background ==
Abu Dahari Osman, a candidate from Barisan Nasional (BN), were elected to the Parliament of Malaysia federal seat of Lipis at the 1995 Malaysian general election, defeating Ahmad Shabery Cheek from Semangat 46. He were a member of United Malays National Organization (UMNO).

On 29 December 1995, Abu Dahari died because of colon cancer. His death means that his Lipis federal seat were vacated, and necessitates for by-election for the seat to be held, as the seat were vacated more that 2 years before the expiry of Malaysian parliament current terms. Election Commission of Malaysia announced that the by-election for the seat will be held on 27 January 1996, with 15 January 1996 set as the nomination day.

== Nomination and campaign ==
On 11 January 1996, BN nominated Amihamzah Ahmad, the UMNO Kuala Lipis division treasurer, and UMNO member since 1975. He previously was an Assistant Secretary to the Minister Of Entrepreneur Development before retiring in June 1995.

On the nomination day 15 February 1996, Amihamzah from BN and an independent candidate, Selvarajoo s/o Kalliannan handed their nomination papers. However minutes before nomination closed, Selvarajoo retracted his nomination papers and announced his support to Amihamzah, leaving Amihamzah declared by SPR as the winner of Lipis seat unopposed.

== Timeline ==
The key dates are listed below.

| Date | Event |
|---|---|
| | Issue of the Writ of Election |
| 15 January 1996 | Nomination Day |
| 15–26 January 1996 | Campaigning Period |
| | Early polling day for postal and overseas voters |
| 27 January 1996 | Polling Day |

== Results ==
Malaysian general by-election, 27 January 1996: Lipis Upon the death of incumbent, Abu Dahari Osman
| Party | Candidate | Votes | % | ∆% |
|---|---|---|---|---|
On the nomination day, Amihamzah Ahmad won uncontested.
| BN | Amihamzah Ahmad | | | |
| Total valid votes | | | 100.00 | |
| Total rejected ballots | | | | |
| Unreturned ballots | | | | |
| Turnout | | | | |
| Registered electors | | | | |
| Majority | | | | |
| BN hold | | Swing | | |

== Previous results ==
Malaysian general election, 1995: Lipis
| Party | Candidate | Votes | % | ∆% |
|---|---|---|---|---|
| BN | Abu Dahari Osman | 18,507 | 68.80 | ▲11.16 |
| S46 | Ahd Shabery Cheek | 8,394 | 31.20 | ▼11.16 |
| Total valid votes | | 26,901 | 100.00 | |
| Total rejected ballots | | 1,859 | | |
| Unreturned ballots | | 251 | | |
| Turnout | | 29,011 | 68.49 | ▼1.88 |
| Registered electors | | 42,358 | | |
| Majority | | 10,113 | 37.60 | ▲22.32 |
| BN hold | | Swing | | |

== Aftermath ==
Amihamzah took his oath as the new MP for Lipis 26 March 1996, in front of the Dewan Rakyat Speaker, Zahir Ismail.
