= 2009 Kuala Terengganu by-election =

Election in Malaysia

← 2008	17 January 2009	2013 →

Kuala Terengganu seat in the Dewan Rakyat
- Turnout: 79.9%
	PAS	BN	IND
Candidate	Mohd Abdul Wahid Endut	Wan Ahmad Farid Wan Salleh	Azharudin Mamat @ Adam
Party	PAS	BN (UMNO)	Independent
Alliance	PR
Popular vote	32,883	30,252	193
Percentage	51.92%	47.77%	0.3%
MP before election
Razali Ismail
BN (UMNO)
Elected MP
Mohd Abdul Wahid Endut
PAS

Kuala Terengganu by-election of 2009 was held on 17 January 2009 after the death of the incumbent Member of Parliament, Razali Ismail. In the 2008 election, Datuk Razali won by a slim 628 vote majority, defeating Pan-Malaysian Islamic Party (PAS) heavyweight Mohamad Sabu and 89-year-old independent candidate, Maimun Yusuf. Prime Minister Datuk Seri Abdullah Ahmad Badawi and Barisan Nasional were confident that Barisan Nasional would retain the Kuala Terengganu parliamentary seat. The Prime Minister had rejected the assumption that there would be a big swing by the voters to the Opposition. Opposition leader Anwar Ibrahim stated that Parti Keadilan Rakyat (PKR) and the Democratic Action Party (DAP) would support any candidate that PAS picked. He was optimistic that Pakatan Rakyat would win in Kuala Terengganu if all its coalition parties worked hard against Barisan Nasional. In the 2008 election Razali, a government minister of the UMNO party, defeated a PAS opposition candidate by 628 votes. For the by-election PAS nominated state assemblyman Mohd Abdul Wahid Endut, while Barisan Nasional nominated Wan Ahmad Farid Wan Salleh. Mohd Abdul won the by-election by 2,631 votes.

== By-election results ==
Malaysian general by-election, 17 January 2009: Kuala Terengganu Upon the death of incumbent, Razali Ismail
Party	Candidate	Votes	%	∆%
PAS	Mohd Abdul Wahid Endut	32,883	51.92	+ 2.93
BN	Wan Ahmad Farid Wan Salleh	30,252	47.77	2.19
Independent	Azharudin Mamat @ Adam	193	0.30	+ 0.30
Total valid votes		63,328	100.00	
Total rejected ballots		665		
Unreturned ballots		109		
Turnout		64,102	79.90	
Registered electors		80,229		
Majority		2,631	4.15	
PAS gain from BN		Swing		?
Source(s) "Pilihan Raya Kecil P.036 Kuala Terengganu". Election Commission of Malaysia. Archived from the original on 2018-09-19.
