= 1973 Johore Timor by-election =

← 1969	8 September 1973	1974 →

P102 seat in the Dewan Rakyat
	First party
	BN
Candidate	Abdul Rahman Sabri
Party	UMNO
Alliance	Alliance
Popular vote	Won uncontested
Percentage	Won uncontested
MP before election
Ismail Abdul Rahman
Alliance (UMNO)
Elected MP
Abdul Rahman Sabri
Alliance (UMNO)

The Johore Timor by-election is a parliamentary by-election that was held in September 1973 in the state of Johor, Malaysia. The Johore Timor seat fell vacant following the death of its member of parliament, and the Deputy Prime Minister of Malaysia, Dr. Ismail Abdul Rahman of Alliance (UMNO) in Johor. Ismail won the seat in 1969 Malaysian general election against Hussin Mohamed Salleh of Pan-Malayan Islamic Party with majority of 7,270.

Abdul Rahman Sabri of Alliance won the by election uncontested, as he was the sole nominee during nomination day on 9 September 1973.

== Results ==
Malaysian general by-election, 8 September 1973: Johore Timor Upon the death of incumbent, Ismail Abdul Rahman
Party	Candidate	Votes	%	∆%
On the nomination day, Abdul Rahman Sabri won uncontested.
Alliance	Abdul Rahman Sabri			
Total valid votes			100.00	
Total rejected ballots				
Unreturned ballots				
Turnout				
Registered electors				
Majority				
Alliance hold		Swing		
