= Batu Buruk =

Batu Buruk (N16)
Terengganu constituency

State constituency
- Legislature: Terengganu State Legislative Assembly
MLA
Muhammad Khalil Abdul Hadi
PN
- Constituency created: 1958
- First contested: 1959
- Last contested: 2023

Demographics
- Electors (2023): 40,759

N16 Batu Buruk within Terengganu, as used for the 2023 state election

Batu Buruk is a state constituency in Terengganu, Malaysia, that has been represented in the Terengganu State Legislative Assembly.

The state constituency was first contested in 1959 and is mandated to return a single Assemblyman to the Terengganu State Legislative Assembly under the first-past-the-post voting system.

== Demographics ==
Ethnic breakdown of Batu Buruk's electorate as of 2023
1. Malay (96.6%)
2. Chinese (2.42%)
3. Other ethnicities (0.63%)
4. Indian (0.32%)

== History ==
=== Polling districts ===
According to the Gazette issued on 30 March 2018, the Batu Buruk constituency has a total of 12 polling districts.

State Constituency	Polling Districts	Code	Location
Batu Buruk (N16)	Pantai Batu Buruk	036/16/01	SMA (Atas) Sultan Zainal Abidin
Batu Buruk (N16)	Nibung	036/16/02	SMK Panji Alam
Batu Buruk (N16)	Gong Tok Nasek	036/16/03	SMK Padang Negara
Batu Buruk (N16)	Bukit Depu	036/16/04	SMK Dato' Razali Ismail
Batu Buruk (N16)	Kuala Ibai	036/16/05	SMK Sultan Sulaiman
Batu Buruk (N16)	Chendering Pantai	036/16/06	SK Chendering
Batu Buruk (N16)	Chendering	036/16/07	SMK Chendering
Batu Buruk (N16)	Taman Permint Jaya	036/16/08	SK Kubang Ikan
Batu Buruk (N16)	Mengabang Tengah	036/16/09	SMK Seri Budiman
Batu Buruk (N16)	Kolam	036/16/10	SMK Tengku Muhammad Ismail
Batu Buruk (N16)	Kenaga	036/16/11	SK Seri Budiman 2
Batu Buruk (N16)	Tok Adis	036/16/12	SK Pusat Kuala Ibai

=== Representation history ===
Members of the Legislative Assembly for Batu Buruk
Assembly	No	Years	Member	Party
Constituency created
Batu Burok
1st	N13	1959–1964	Abdul Muttalib Salleh	Negara
2nd	N13	1964–1969	Abdul Muttalib Salleh	Alliance (UMNO)
		1969–1971	Assembly dissolved	
3rd	N13	1971–1973	Mat Yasin Daud	PMIP
3rd	N13	1973–1974	Mat Yasin Daud	BN (PMIP)
4th	N20	1974–1978	Abdul Muttalib Salleh	Independent
5th	N20	1978–1982	Abdul Muttalib Salleh	BN (UMNO)
6th	N20	1982–1986	Wan Abd Muttalib @ Wan Musa Embong	PAS
Batu Buruk
7th	N15	1986–1990	Abdul Muttalib Salleh	BN (UMNO)
8th	N15	1990–1995	Wan Abd Muttalib @ Wan Musa Embong	PAS
9th	N16	1995–1999	Wan Abd Muttalib @ Wan Musa Embong	PAS
10th	N16	1999–2004	Wan Abd Muttalib @ Wan Musa Embong	PAS
11th	N16	2004–2008	Wan Abd Muttalib @ Wan Musa Embong	PAS
12th	N16	2008–2013	Syed Azman Syed Ahmad Nawawi	PR (PAS)
13th	N16	2013–2018	Syed Azman Syed Ahmad Nawawi	PR (PAS)
14th	N16	2018–2020	Muhammad Khalil Abdul Hadi	PAS
14th	N16	2020–2023	Muhammad Khalil Abdul Hadi	PN (PAS)
15th	N16	2023–present	Muhammad Khalil Abdul Hadi	PN (PAS)

== Election results ==
Terengganu state election, 2023: Batu Buruk
Party	Candidate	Votes	%	∆%
PAS	Muhammad Khalil Abdul Hadi	23,767	79.58	▲24.67
PH	Mohamad Zamir Ghazali	6,099	20.42	▲11.12
Total valid votes		29,866	100.00	
Total rejected ballots		297		
Unreturned ballots		30		
Turnout		30,193	74.08	▼11.48
Registered electors		40,759		
Majority		17,668	59.16	▲40.04
PAS hold		Swing		

Terengganu state election, 2018: Batu Buruk
Party	Candidate	Votes	%	∆%
PAS	Muhammad Khalil Abdul Hadi	15,184	54.91	▼0.23
BN	Zamri Awang Hitam	9,896	35.79	▼9.06
PKR	Raja Kamarul Bahrin Shah	2,572	9.30	▲9.30
Total valid votes		27,652	100.00	
Total rejected ballots		221		
Unreturned ballots		116		
Turnout		27,989	85.56	▼2.98
Registered electors		32,714		
Majority		5,288	19.12	▲8.84
PAS hold		Swing		

Terengganu state election, 2013: Batu Buruk
Party	Candidate	Votes	%	∆%
PAS	Syed Azman Syed Ahmad Nawawi	13,831	55.14	▲2.26
BN	Che Mat @ Mohamed Jusoh	11,254	44.86	▼2.26
Total valid votes		25,085	100.00	
Total rejected ballots		231		
Unreturned ballots		67		
Turnout		25,383	88.54	▲3.50
Registered electors		28,667		
Majority		2,273	10.28	▲4.52
PAS hold		Swing		
Source(s) "Federal Government Gazette - Notice of Contested Election, State Legislative Assembly for the State of Terengganu [P.U. (B) 188/2013]" (PDF). Attorney General's Chambers of Malaysia. 26 April 2013. "Federal Government Gazette - Results of Contested Election and Statements of the Poll after the Official Addition of Votes, State Constituencies for the State of Terengganu [P.U. (B) 229/2013]" (PDF). Attorney General's Chambers of Malaysia. 22 May 2013.

Terengganu state election, 2008: Batu Buruk
Party	Candidate	Votes	%	∆%
PAS	Syed Azman Syed Ahmad Nawawi	10,672	52.88	▲2.47
BN	Nordiana Shafie	9,511	47.12	▼2.47
Total valid votes		20,183	100.00	
Total rejected ballots		212		
Unreturned ballots		33		
Turnout		20,428	85.04	▼0.64
Registered electors		24,022		
Majority		1,161	5.76	▲4.94
PAS hold		Swing		

Terengganu state election, 2004: Batu Buruk
Party	Candidate	Votes	%	∆%
PAS	Wan Abd Muttalib @ Wan Musa Embong	8,621	50.41	▼20.47
BN	Che Mat @ Mohamed Jusoh	8,481	49.59	▲20.47
Total valid votes		17,102	100.00	
Total rejected ballots		217		
Unreturned ballots		9		
Turnout		17,328	85.68	▲6.44
Registered electors		20,223		
Majority		140	0.82	▼39.34
PAS hold		Swing		

Terengganu state election, 1999: Batu Buruk
Party	Candidate	Votes	%	∆%
PAS	Wan Abd Muttalib @ Wan Musa Embong	9,422	70.08	▲17.49
BN	Abu Bakar Othman	4,022	29.92	▼17.49
Total valid votes		13,444	100.00	
Total rejected ballots		265		
Unreturned ballots		38		
Turnout		13,747	79.24	▲0.33
Registered electors		17,349		
Majority		5,400	40.16	▲35.18
PAS hold		Swing		

Terengganu state election, 1995: Batu Buruk
Party	Candidate	Votes	%	∆%
PAS	Wan Abd Muttalib @ Wan Musa Embong	6,756	52.49	▼1.52
BN	Zubir Embong	6,115	47.51	▲2.29
Total valid votes		12,871	100.00	
Total rejected ballots		263		
Unreturned ballots		54		
Turnout		13,188	78.91	▼3.08
Registered electors		16,712		
Majority		641	4.98	▼3.81
PAS hold		Swing		

Terengganu state election, 1990: Batu Buruk
Party	Candidate	Votes	%	∆%
PAS	Wan Abd Muttalib @ Wan Musa Embong	6,048	54.01	▲7.18
BN	Zulkifli Mohd Nasir	5,064	45.22	▼7.95
Independent	Rasid Musa	86	0.77	▲0.77
Total valid votes		11,198	100.00	
Total rejected ballots		305		
Unreturned ballots		18		
Turnout		11,521	82.23	▲3.15
Registered electors		14,011		
Majority		984	8.79	▲2.45
PAS gain from BN		Swing		?

Terengganu state election, 1986: Batu Buruk
Party	Candidate	Votes	%	∆%
BN	Abdul Muttalib Salleh	4,651	53.17	▲3.72
PAS	Wan Abd Muttalib @ Wan Musa Embong	4,097	46.83	▼3.72
Total valid votes		8,748	100.00	
Total rejected ballots		386		
Unreturned ballots		0		
Turnout		9,134	79.08	▲0.06
Registered electors		11,550		
Majority		554	6.33	▲5.24
BN gain from PAS		Swing		?

Terengganu state election, 1982: Batu Burok
Party	Candidate	Votes	%	∆%
PAS	Wan Abd Muttalib @ Wan Musa Embong	3,979	50.55	▲4.95
BN	Mustaffa Awang	3,893	49.45	▲2.57
Total valid votes		7,872	100.00	
Total rejected ballots		210		
Unreturned ballots		0		
Turnout		8,082	79.02	
Registered electors		10,228		
Majority		86	1.10	▼0.18
PAS gain from BN		Swing		?

Terengganu state election, 1978: Batu Burok
Party	Candidate	Votes	%	∆%
BN	Abdul Muttalib Salleh	2,700	46.88	▲12.08
PAS	Wan Abd Muttalib @ Wan Musa Embong	2,626	45.60	▲45.60
Parti Rakyat Malaysia	Yasin @ Ismail Awang	433	7.52	▼15.28
Total valid votes		5,759	100.00	
Total rejected ballots		427		
Unreturned ballots		0		
Turnout		6,186	71.96	▲6.24
Registered electors		8,597		
Majority		74	1.28	▼1.95
BN gain from Independent		Swing		?

Terengganu state election, 1974: Batu Burok
Party	Candidate	Votes	%	∆%
Independent	Abdul Muttalib Salleh	1,706	38.03	▲38.03
BN	Mohamed Ghazali Ahmad	1,561	34.80	▲34.80
Parti Sosialis Rakyat Malaysia	Ismail Awang	1,023	22.80	▲22.80
Independent	Harun @ Abdul Pahman Mohamed	196	4.37	▲4.37
Total valid votes		4,486	100.00	
Total rejected ballots		461		
Unreturned ballots		0		
Turnout		4,947	65.71	▼4.86
Registered electors		7,528		
Majority		145	3.23	▼12.89
Independent gain from PMIP		Swing		?

Terengganu state election, 1969: Batu Burok
Party	Candidate	Votes	%	∆%
PMIP	Mat Yasin Daud	3,321	58.06	▲58.06
Alliance	Abdul Muttalib Salleh	2,399	41.94	▼15.40
Total valid votes		5,720	100.00	
Total rejected ballots		427		
Unreturned ballots				
Turnout		6,147	70.57	▲2.12
Registered electors		8,710		
Majority		922	16.12	▲1.44
PMIP gain from Alliance		Swing		?

Terengganu state election, 1964: Batu Burok
Party	Candidate	Votes	%	∆%
Alliance	Abdul Muttalib Salleh	2,542	57.34	▲24.09
National Party	Ismail Mohamed Daud	1,891	42.66	▼3.46
Total valid votes		4,433	100.00	
Total rejected ballots		224		
Unreturned ballots		0		
Turnout		4,657	68.45	▲5.94
Registered electors		6,804		
Majority		651	14.68	▲1.81
Alliance gain from National Party		Swing		?

Terengganu state election, 1959: Batu Burok
Party	Candidate	Votes	%	∆%
National Party	Abdul Muttalib Salleh	1,315	46.12	
Alliance	Che Muda Abdullah	948	33.25	
PMIP	Su Mahmud Dato Amar	487	17.08	
Socialist Front	Wan Hassan Abdul Kadir	101	3.54	
Total valid votes		2,851	100.00	
Total rejected ballots		103		
Unreturned ballots		0		
Turnout		2,954	62.51	
Registered electors		4,726		
Majority		367	12.87	
This was a new constituency created.
