= 1980 Oya by-election =

← 1979	Not contested (scheduled on 21 February 1980)	1983 →

Oya seat in the Sarawak State Legislative Assembly
	BN
Candidate	Salleh Jafaruddin
Party	UMNO
Alliance	BN
Popular vote	Won uncontested
Percentage	Won uncontested
MP before election
Edward Esnen
BN (PBB)
Elected MP
Salleh Jafaruddin
BN (PBB)

The 1980 Oya by-election was a by-election that was scheduled to be held on 21 February 1980 for the Sarawak State Legislative Assembly seat of Oya. It was called following the resignation of its assemblyman Edward Esnen in December 1979. Edward won the seat on 1979 Sarawak state election in a five cornered fight.

Salleh Jafaruddin, of Barisan Nasional won the by election uncontested, as he was the sole nominee during nomination day on 28 January 1980.

== Nomination ==
By the end of nomination day, Salleh won as being the sole candidate.

== Results ==
Sarawak state by-election, 21 February 1980: Oya Upon the resignation of incumbent, Edward Esnen
Party	Candidate	Votes	%	∆%
On the nomination day, Salleh Jafaruddin won uncontested.
BN	Salleh Jafaruddin			
Total valid votes			100.00	
Total rejected ballots				
Unreturned ballots				
Turnout				
Registered electors				
Majority				
BN hold		Swing		
