= Mohd Abdul Wahid Endut =

Malaysian politician

Yang Berbahagia Dato' Mohd Abdul Wahid Endut DPMT
- محمد عبدالواحد اندوت

Member of the Terengganu State Executive Council
- In office 2 December 1999 – 24 March 2004 (Entrepreneur Development, Small Business and Consumer Affairs)
- Monarch: Mizan Zainal Abidin
- Menteri Besar: Abdul Hadi Awang
- Preceded by: Othman Daud (Entrepreneur Development and Small Business); Wong Foon Meng (Consumer Affairs)
- Succeeded by: Abdul Rahin Mohd Said (Entrepreneur Development and Small Business; Toh Chin Yaw (Consumer Affairs)
- Constituency: Wakaf Mempelam

Member of Parliament for Kuala Terengganu, Terengganu
- In office 17 January 2009 – 5 May 2013
- Preceded by: Razali Ismail (BN–UMNO)
- Succeeded by: Raja Kamarul Bahrin Shah Raja Ahmad (PR–PAS)
- Majority: 2,631 (2009)

Member of the Terengganu State Legislative Assembly for Wakaf Mempelam
- In office 21 October 1990 – 9 May 2018
- Preceded by: Mustafa @ Hassan Ali (PAS)
- Succeeded by: Wan Sukairi Wan Abdullah (PAS)
- Majority: 1,163 (1990); 1,119 (1995); 5,760 (1999); 1,888 (2004); 2,193 (2008); 2,810 (2013)

Personal details
- Born: 29 September 1957 (age 68) Terengganu, Federation of Malaya (now Malaysia)
- Party: Pan-Malaysian Islamic Party (PAS)
- Other political affiliations: Perikatan Nasional (PN); Muafakat Nasional (MN); Pakatan Rakyat (PR); Barisan Alternatif (BA); Angkatan Perpaduan Ummah (APU)
- Occupation: Politician

Mohd Abdul Wahid bin Endut (born 29 September 1957) was the Member of the Parliament of Malaysia for the Kuala Terengganu constituency in Terengganu (2009 to 2013) the Member of the State Assembly of Terengganu for the seat of Wakaf Mempelam (1990 to 2018), sitting as a member of the opposition Pan-Malaysian Islamic Party (PAS).

Abdul Wahid—an ally of PAS leader Abdul Hadi Awang—was elected to Federal Parliament in a by-election for Kuala Terengganu on 17 January 2009 after the death of the incumbent member from the governing Barisan Nasional coalition. Abdul Wahid won the seat by a margin of 2,631 votes.

Abdul Wahid served in the State Assembly of Terengganu since 1990 until 2018. He was a member of the Executive Council before PAS' defeat in the 2004 election.

== Election results ==
Parliament of Malaysia
Year	Constituency	Candidate	Votes	Pct	Opponent(s)	Votes	Pct	Ballots cast	Majority	Turnout
2009	P036 Kuala Terengganu	Mohd Abdul Wahid Endut (PAS)	32,883	51.92%	Wan Ahmad Farid Wan Salleh (UMNO)	30,252	47.77%	63,993	2,631	79.76%
2009	P036 Kuala Terengganu	Mohd Abdul Wahid Endut (PAS)	32,883	51.92%	Azharuddin Mamat (IND)	193	0.30%	63,993	2,631	79.76%

Terengganu State Legislative Assembly
Year	Constituency	Candidate	Votes	Pct	Opponent(s)	Votes	Pct	Ballots cast	Majority	Turnout
1990	N16 Wakaf Mempelam	Mohd Abdul Wahid Endut (PAS)	6,383	54.52%	Abd Latif Mohd (UMNO)	5,220	44.59%	12,157	1,163	80.98%
1990	N16 Wakaf Mempelam	Mohd Abdul Wahid Endut (PAS)	6,383	54.52%	Wan Deraman Wan Nik (IND)	104	0.89%	12,157	1,163	80.98%
1995	N13 Wakaf Mempelam	Mohd Abdul Wahid Endut (PAS)	6,379	54.81%	Sulong Mamat (UMNO)	5,260	45.19%	11,875	1,119	78.86%
1999	N13 Wakaf Mempelam	Mohd Abdul Wahid Endut (PAS)	8,981	73.39%	Muhamad Ngah (UMNO)	3,221	26.32%	12,496	5,760	80.20%
2004	N13 Wakaf Mempelam	Mohd Abdul Wahid Endut (PAS)	8,565	56.17%	Hamzah Mohamad Zain (UMNO)	6,677	43.79%	15,399	1,888	85.92%
2008	N13 Wakaf Mempelam	Mohd Abdul Wahid Endut (PAS)	9,645	56.33%	Othman Awang (UMNO)	7,452	43.53%	17,277	2,193	83.98%
2013	N13 Wakaf Mempelam	Mohd Abdul Wahid Endut (PAS)	12,427	56.02%	Wan Mahyuddin Wan Ngah (UMNO)	9,617	43.35%	22,402	2,810	88.76%

== Honours ==
- Terengganu
  - Knight Commander of the Order of the Crown of Terengganu (DPMT) – Dato' (2023)
