= Muhammad Khalil Abdul Hadi =

Malaysian politician

Yang Berhormat Tuan Dr. Muhammad Khalil Abdul Hadi KMN AMT MLA
- محمّد خليل عبدالهادي

Member of the Terengganu State Executive Council (Information, Preaching and Syariah Empowerment)
- Incumbent
- Assumed office 15 August 2023
- Monarch: Mizan Zainal Abidin
- Menteri Besar: Ahmad Samsuri Mokhtar
- Constituency: Batu Buruk

Deputy Member of the Terengganu State Executive Council (Trade, Industry, Regional Development and Administration Wellbeing)
- In office 10 May 2018 – 15 August 2023
- Monarch: Mizan Zainal Abidin
- Menteri Besar: Ahmad Samsuri Mokhtar
- Member: Tengku Hassan Tengku Omar
- Preceded by: Position established
- Constituency: Batu Buruk

Youth Chief of the Malaysian Islamic Party
- In office 28 April 2017 – 19 June 2019
- President: Abdul Hadi Awang
- Deputy: Khairil Nizam Khirudin
- Preceded by: Nik Mohamad Abduh
- Succeeded by: Khairil Nizam Khirudin

Member of the Terengganu State Legislative Assembly for Batu Buruk
- Incumbent
- Assumed office 9 May 2018
- Preceded by: Syed Azman Syed Ahmad Nawawi (PR–PAS)
- Majority: 5,288 (2018); 17,668 (2023)

Faction represented in the Terengganu State Legislative Assembly
- 2018–2020: Malaysian Islamic Party
- 2020–: Perikatan Nasional

Personal details
- Born: Muhammad Khalil bin Abdul Hadi; 20 March 1977 (age 49) Marang, Marang (district), (Terengganu) , Malaysia
- Citizenship: Malaysia
- Party: Malaysian Islamic Party (PAS) (1995 - now)
- Other political affiliations: Gagasan Sejahtera (GS) (2016–2020); Perikatan Nasional (PN) (since 2020 - now)
- Spouse: Farhaana Husainy Hasbullah
- Children: 4
- Parent(s): Abdul Hadi Awang; Zainab Awang Ngah
- Education: Iman University; University of Portsmouth; Universiti Sultan Zainal Abidin
- Occupation: Politician

Muhammad Khalil Abdul Hadi is a Malaysian politician who has served as Member of the Terengganu State Executive Council (EXCO) in the Perikatan Nasional (PN) state administration under Menteri Besar Ahmad Samsuri Mokhtar since August 2023 as well as Member of the Terengganu State Legislative Assembly (MLA) for Batu Buruk since May 2018. He served as the Deputy EXCO Member under Menteri Besar Ahmad Samsuri and Member Tengku Hassan Tengku Omar from May 2018 to his promotion to EXCO Member in August 2023. He is a member of the Malaysian Islamic Party (PAS), a component party of the PN coalition. He served as the Youth Chief of PAS from April 2017 to June 2019. He is also the son of Abdul Hadi Awang, the President of PAS and Member of Parliament (MP) for Marang.

== Background ==
Muhammad Khalil Abdul Hadi was born on March 20, 1977, in Marang, Terengganu. He was the eldest of 14 siblings. His father is the seventh and longest-serving PAS President and Marang MP, Tan Sri Dato' Seri Haji Abdul Hadi Awang and his mother is Puan Sri To' Puan Seri Hajah Zainab Awang Ngah.

== Education ==
He obtained his primary education in the Rusila National School in Terengganu and is a graduate of Iman University, Yemen in which he is majoring a bachelor's degree in Islamic and Shariah Studies. In addition, he also graduated with a master's degree in Islamic Studies from the University of Portsmouth, United Kingdom. On October 30, 2022, he graduated from Universiti Sultan Zainal Abidin with a doctorate degree.

== Politics ==
He has been involved in politics since 2006 after graduating from Iman University, Yemen. Among the positions he held in PAS were PAS Youth Chief of Rusila Branch, PAS Youth Chief of Ru Rendang, Marang PAS Youth Chief, Information Chief of PAS Marang, PAS Youth Deputy Chief (2013-2017) and PAS Youth Chief (2017-2019).

== Selected as PAS Youth Chief ==
Muhammad Khalil won the party's Youth chief position without contesting at the PAS Annual Mansion in Kedah. He took over the post from former incumbent Ustaz Nik Abduh Nik Aziz. The result of the party election was announced by Election Committee Chairman Wan Mutalib Embong at the 58th PAS Malaysia Youth Assembly Muktamar.

== Election results ==
Terengganu State Legislative Assembly
Year	Constituency	Candidate	Votes	Pct	Opponent(s)	Votes	Pct	Ballots cast	Majority	Turnout
2018	N16 Batu Buruk	Muhammad Khalil Abdul Hadi (PAS)	15,184	54.91%	Zamri Awang Hitam (UMNO)	9,896	35.79%	27,989	5,288	85.60%
2018	N16 Batu Buruk	Muhammad Khalil Abdul Hadi (PAS)	15,184	54.91%	Raja Kamarul Bahrin Shah Raja Ahmad Baharuddin Shah (AMANAH)	2,572	9.30%	27,989	5,288	85.60%
2023	N16 Batu Buruk	Muhammad Khalil Abdul Hadi (PAS)	23,767	79.58%	Mohd Zamir Ghazali (AMANAH)	6,099	20.42%	30,193	17,668	74.08%

== Honours ==
- Malaysia
  - Officer of the Order of the Defender of the Realm (KMN) (2021)
- Terengganu
  - Member of the Order of the Crown of Terengganu (AMT) (2023)
