= 1962 Kuala Trengganu Selatan by-election =

- 19 March 1962

P027 seat in the Dewan Rakyat
- Turnout: 13,761
	First party	Second party	Third party
	All	Neg	PMIP
Candidate	Ismail Kassim	Garieb Abdul Raouf	Tengku Shahdan Tengku Abdul Majid
Party	UMNO	Parti Negara	PMIP
Alliance	Alliance
Popular vote	7,275	5,198	889
Percentage	54.45%	38.90%	6.65%
MP before election
Onn Jaafar
Parti Negara
Elected MP
Ismail Kassim
Alliance (UMNO)

The Kuala Trengganu Selatan by-election is a parliamentary by-election that was held on 19 March 1962 in the state of Terengganu in the Federation of Malaya. The Kuala Trengganu Selatan seat fell vacant following the death of its member of parliament Onn Jaafar of Parti Negara. He won the seat in 1959 Malayan general election with a majority of 2,612 votes.

Ismail Kassim of Alliance, won the by election, defeating Garieb Abdul Raouf of Parti Negara and Tengku Shahdan Tengku Abdul Majid of PMIP with a majority of 2,077 votes. The constituency had 20,400 voters.

== Nomination ==
Nomination day was set at 26 February 1962 while polling day is set at 19 March 1962. Prior nomination, at least four candidates were initially expected to contest. Alliance shortlisted Senator Engku Mokhsein, his elder brother Engku Wok Abdul Rahman and Ismail Kasim. Parti Rakyat Malaysia intend to nominate its National chairman of Socialist Front, Ishak Mohamed. PMIP shortlisted Su Mahmud Dato Amar and Abu Bakar Hamzah, party's publicity chief. Socialist Front later intend to nominate hospital assistant, Wan Abdul Hamid but he later withdrawn his candidacy due to government refusal to allow him to retire with pension in order to contest the by-election.Parti Negara intention to nominate its general secretary, Garieb Abdul Raouf, were met with resistance from its Kelantan branch which favor local candidate.

However, on nomination day, only three candidates were confirmed. Alliance nominated defeated candidate in 1959 Malayan general election, Ismail Kassim. Parti Negara nominated its general secretary, Garieb Abdul Raouf while PMIP nominated former policeman, Tengku Shahdan Tengku Abdul Majid.

== Results ==
Malaysian general by-election, 19 March 1962: Kuala Trengganu Selatan Upon the death of Onn Jaafar
Party	Candidate	Votes	%	∆%
Alliance	Ismail Kassim	7,275	54.45	▲40.23
National Party	Garieb Abdul Raouf	5,198	38.90	▼20.88
PMIP	Tengku Shahdan Tengku Abdul Majid	889	6.65	▲6.95
Total valid votes		13,362	100.00	
Total rejected ballots		399		
Unreturned ballots		0		
Turnout		13,761	67.32	▼2.77
Registered electors		20,441		
Majority		2,077	15.55	▼4.01
Alliance gain from National Party		Swing		?
