= Parti Negara =

National Party Parti Negara
- Abbreviation: Negara
- Founder: Onn Jaafar
- Founded: 28 February 1954
- Dissolved: 12 February 1967
- Headquarters: Kota Bharu, Malaysia
- Ideology: Nationalism
- Colours: Yellow
- Slogan: For God and Country

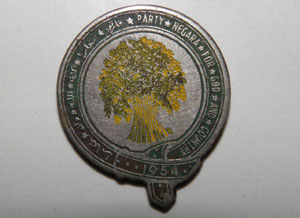
A party's badge, showcasing its logo.

The Parti Negara (lit. 'National Party' also spelled Party Negara) was a Malay-based political party which was formed by former leaders of the Independence of Malaya Party (IMP) in 1954, and formally launched in February 1954. It was founded by Dato Sir Onn Jaafar, the first president of the United Malays National Organisation (UMNO). He formed the party after losing an internal power struggle.

The party, which was constitutionally multi-ethnic, sought to create a niche for itself as a third force in the late fifties and early sixties but it failed miserably. The party did not gain significant support within the Malay community, and was derided by the UMNO-led Alliance Party for its alleged chauvinism. The only parliamentary seat Parti Negara ever won was in the 1959 general elections in Terengganu, by Onn himself.

With the death of Onn in 1962, Parti Negara eventually fizzled out. The seat that Onn won was won back by the Alliance in the subsequent by-election.

== List of party leaders ==
President

#	Name	Took office	Left office	Remarks
1	Hamzah Abdullah	28 February 1954	10 December 1955	
2	Onn Jaafar	10 December 1955	19 January 1962	
3	Baba Ludek	19 January 1962	3 January 1964	

Secretary-General

#	Name	Took office	Left office	Remarks
1	Raja Ayoub Raja Bot	28 February 1954	19 October 1954	
2	Onn Jaafar	19 October 1954	10 December 1955	
3	Raja Ayoub Raja Bot	10 December 1955	19 January 1962	
4	Garieb Abdul Raouf	19 January 1962	23 October 1965	

== General election results ==
Election	Total seats won	Total votes	Share of votes	Outcome of election	Election leader
1955	0 / 52	78,909	7.88%	; No representation in Legislative Council	Onn Jaafar
1959	1 / 104	32,578	2.11%	▲1 seat; Opposition	Onn Jaafar
1964	0 / 104	7,319	0.36%	▼1 seat; No representation in Parliament	Garieb Abdul Raouf

== State election results ==
State election	State Legislative Assembly								
State election	Perlis	Kedah	Kelantan	Terengganu	Penang	Selangor	Negeri Sembilan	Johor	Total won / Total contested
2/3 majority	2 / 3								
1954				0 / 12					0 / 12
1955	0 / 9		0 / 16		0 / 14		0 / 12	0 / 16	0 / 19
1959		0 / 24	0 / 30	4 / 24	0 / 24	0 / 28	0 / 24	0 / 32	4 / 23
1964				0 / 24					0 / 17
