= Deputy Minister of Tourism, Arts and Culture (Malaysia) =

Malaysian government deputy minister

- Timbalan Menteri Pelancongan, Seni dan Budaya
- Coat of Arms of Government of Malaysia
- Incumbent; Chiew Choon Man since 17 December 2025
- Ministry of Tourism, Arts and Culture
- Style: Yang Berhormat
- Member of: Cabinet of Malaysia
- Reports to: Prime Minister; Minister of Tourism, Arts and Culture
- Seat: Putrajaya
- Appointer: Yang di-Pertuan Agong; on advice of the Prime Minister
- Inaugural holder: Engku Muhsein Abdul Kadir (as Assistant Minister of Youth, Culture and Sports)
- Formation: 1964

The Deputy Minister of Tourism, Arts and Culture (Malay: Timbalan Menteri Pelancongan, Seni dan Budaya; Chinese: 旅游, 艺术及文化部副部长; Tamil: சுற்றுலா, கலை மற்றும் கலாச்சார துணை அமைச்சர்) is a Malaysian cabinet position serving as deputy head of the Ministry of Tourism, Arts and Culture.

== List of Deputy Ministers of Tourism, Arts and Culture ==
The following individuals have been appointed as Deputy Minister of Youth and Sports, or any of its precedent titles:

Colour key (for political coalition/parties):

Coalition	Component party	Timeline
Alliance Party	United Malays National Organisation (UMNO)	1957–1973
Barisan Nasional (BN)	United Malays National Organisation (UMNO)	1973–present
Barisan Nasional (BN)	Malaysian Chinese Association (MCA)	1973–present
Barisan Nasional (BN)	Parti Pesaka Bumiputera Bersatu (PBB)	1973–2018
Barisan Nasional (BN)	Parti Rakyat Sarawak (PRS)	1973–2018
Barisan Nasional (BN)	People's Progressive Party (PPP)	–2018
Pakatan Harapan (PH)	People's Justice Party (PKR)	2015–present
Perikatan Nasional (PN)	Homeland Solidarity Party (STAR)	2020–present
–	Parti Bangsa Malaysia (PBM)	2020–2022
Gabungan Rakyat Sabah (GRS)	Direct Member	2022–

=== Assistant Minister of Youth, Culture and Sports (1964–) ===
Portrait	Name (Birth–Death) Constituency	Political coalition	Political party	Took office	Left office	Prime Minister (Cabinet)
	Engku Muhsein Abdul Kadir (b.?); MP for Trengganu Tengah	Alliance	UMNO	1964		Tunku Abdul Rahman (III)
Post renamed into Assistant Minister of Culture, Youth and Sports
=== Assistant Minister of Culture, Youth and Sports ===
Portrait	Name (Birth–Death) Constituency	Political coalition	Political party	Took office	Left office	Prime Minister (Cabinet)
	Engku Muhsein Abdul Kadir (b.?); MP for Trengganu Tengah	Alliance	UMNO		1970	Tunku Abdul Rahman (III • IIII)
Post renamed into Deputy Minister of Culture, Youth and Sports
=== Deputy Minister of Culture, Youth and Sports ===
Portrait	Name (Birth–Death) Constituency	Political coalition	Political party	Took office	Left office	Prime Minister (Cabinet)
	Neo Yee Pan (1938–2020); MP for Muar	BN	MCA	March; 1976	31 December 1977	Hussein Onn (I)
	Mak Hon Kam (?–?); MP for Tanjong Malim	BN	MCA	1978		Hussein Onn (II)
	Chin Hon Ngian (?–?); MP for Renggam	BN	MCA		1982	Hussein Onn (II); Mahathir Mohamad (I)
	Rosemary Chow Poh Kheng (1927–2023); MP for Ulu Langat	BN	MCA	29 April 1982	10 August 1986	Mahathir Mohamad (II)
Post renamed into Deputy Minister of Youth and Sports and Deputy Minister of Culture, Arts and Tourism
=== Deputy Minister of Culture, Arts and Tourism ===
Portrait	Name (Birth–Death) Constituency	Political coalition	Political party	Took office	Left office	Prime Minister (Cabinet)
	Ng Cheng Kuai (b.?); MP for Lumut	BN	MCA	15 June 1989	26 October 1990	Mahathir Mohamad (III)
	Chan Kong Choy (b.1955); MP for Lipis	BN	MCA	27 October 1990	3 May 1995	Mahathir Mohamad (IIII)
	Teng Gaik Kwan (b.?); MP for Raub	BN	MCA	8 May 1995	14 December 1999	Mahathir Mohamad (V)
	Fu Ah Kiow (b.?); MP for Mentakab	BN	MCA	15 December 1999	26 March 2004	Mahathir Mohamad (VI); Abdullah Ahmad Badawi (I)
Post renamed into Deputy Minister of Tourism and Deputy Minister of Arts, Culture and Heritage
=== Deputy Minister of Tourism ===
Portrait	Name (Birth–Death) Constituency	Political coalition	Political party	Took office	Left office	Prime Minister (Cabinet)
	Ahmad Zahid Hamidi (b.1953); MP for Bagan Datok	BN	UMNO	27 March 2004	14 February 2006	Abdullah Ahmad Badawi (II)
	Donald Lim Siang Chai (b.?); MP for Petaling Jaya Selatan	BN	MCA	14 February 2006	18 March 2008	Abdullah Ahmad Badawi (II)
	Sulaiman Abdul Rahman Taib (b.1968); MP for Kota Samarahan	BN	PBB	19 March 2008	14 December 2009	Abdullah Ahmad Badawi (III); Najib Razak (I)
	James Dawos Mamit (1948–2019); MP for Mambong	BN	PBB	14 December 2009	15 May 2013	Najib Razak (I)
Post spited into Deputy Minister of Tourism and Deputy Minister of Arts, Culture and Heritage
=== Deputy Minister of Arts, Culture and Heritage ===
Portrait	Name (Birth–Death) Constituency	Political coalition	Political party	Took office	Left office	Prime Minister (Cabinet)
	Wong Kam Hoong (b.?); MP for Bayan Baru	BN	MCA	27 March 2004	18 March 2008	Abdullah Ahmad Badawi (II)
Post renamed to Deputy Minister of National Unity, Arts, Culture and Heritage
=== Deputy Minister of National Unity, Arts, Culture and Heritage ===
Portrait	Name (Birth–Death) Constituency	Political coalition	Political party	Took office	Left office	Prime Minister (Cabinet)
	Teng Boon Soon (b.1941); MP for Tebrau	BN	MCA	19 March 2008	9 April 2009	Abdullah Ahmad Badawi (III)
Post renamed to Deputy Minister of Information, Communications, Arts and Culture
=== Deputy Minister of Information, Communications, Arts and Culture ===
Portrait	Name (Birth–Death) Constituency	Political coalition	Political party	Took office	Left office	Prime Minister (Cabinet)
	Heng Seai Kie (b.1962); Senator	BN	MCA	10 April 2009	4 June 2010	Najib Razak (I)
	Joseph Salang Gandum (b.1951); MP for Julau	BN	PRS	10 April 2009	15 May 2013	Najib Razak (I)
	Maglin Dennis d'Cruz (b.?); Senator	BN	PPP	4 June 2010	15 May 2013	Najib Razak (I)
Post renamed to Deputy Minister of Tourism and Culture
=== Deputy Minister of Tourism and Culture ===
Portrait	Name (Birth–Death) Constituency	Political coalition	Political party	Took office	Left office	Prime Minister (Cabinet)
	Mas Ermieyati Samsudin (b.1976); MP for Masjid Tanah	BN	UMNO	29 July 2015	9 May 2018	Najib Razak (II)
"Post renamed into Deputy Minister of Tourism, Arts and Culture"
=== Deputy Minister of Tourism, Arts and Culture ===
Portrait	Name (Birth–Death) Constituency	Political coalition	Political party	Took office	Left office	Prime Minister (Cabinet)
	Muhammad Bakhtiar Wan Chik (b.1965); MP for Balik Pulau	PH	PKR	2 July 2018	24 February 2020	Mahathir Mohamad (VII)
	Jeffrey Gapari Kitingan (b.1948); MP for Keningau	PN	STAR	10 March 2020	29 September 2020	Muhyiddin Yassin (I)
	Guan Dee Koh Hoi (1954–2021); Senator	PN	STAR	16 April 2021	16 August 2021	Muhyiddin Yassin (I)
	Edmund Santhara Kumar Ramanaidu (b.1971); MP for Segamat	–	PBM	30 August 2021	24 November 2022	Ismail Sabri Yaakob (I)
	Khairul Firdaus Akbar Khan (b.1983); MP for Batu Sapi	GRS	Direct Member	10 December 2022	17 December 2025	Anwar Ibrahim (I)
	Chiew Choon Man (b.1991); MP for Miri	PH	PKR	17 December 2025	Incumbent	Anwar Ibrahim (I)

== See also ==
- Minister of Tourism, Arts and Culture (Malaysia)
