= Deputy Minister of Youth and Sports (Malaysia) =

Malaysian government deputy minister

- Timbalan Menteri Belia dan Sukan
- Coat of Arms of Government of Malaysia

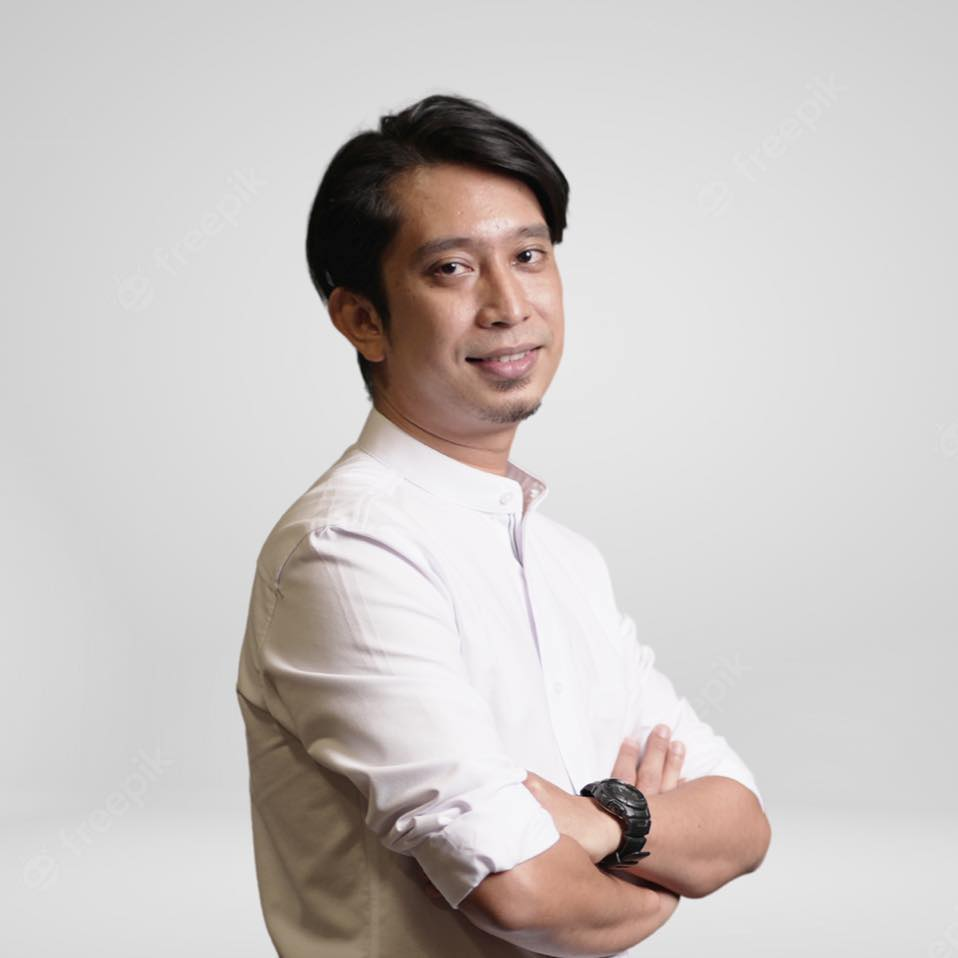
- Incumbent; Adam Adli Abdul Halim since 10 December 2022
- Ministry of Youth and Sports
- Style: Yang Berhormat
- Member of: Cabinet of Malaysia
- Reports to: Prime Minister; Minister of Youth and Sports
- Seat: Putrajaya
- Appointer: Yang di-Pertuan Agong on advice of the Prime Minister
- Term length: No term fixed
- Inaugural holder: Engku Muhsein Abdul Kadir (as Assistant Minister of Youth, Culture and Sports)
- Formation: 1964

The Deputy Minister of Youth and Sports (Malay: Timbalan Menteri Belia dan Sukan; Chinese: 青年及体育部副部长; Tamil: இளைஞர் மற்றும் விளையாட்டுத்துறை பிரதி அமைச்சர்) is a Malaysian cabinet position serving as deputy head of the Ministry of Youth and Sports.

== List of Deputy Ministers of Youth and Sports ==
The following individuals have been appointed as Deputy Minister of Youth and Sports, or any of its precedent titles:

Colour key (for political coalition/parties):

Coalition	Component party	Timeline
Alliance Party	United Malays National Organisation (UMNO)	1957–1973
Barisan Nasional (BN)	United Malays National Organisation (UMNO)	1973–present
Barisan Nasional (BN)	Malaysian Chinese Association (MCA)	1973–present
Barisan Nasional (BN)	Malaysian Indian Congress (MIC)	1973–present
Pakatan Harapan (PH)	Democratic Action Party (DAP)	2015–present
Pakatan Harapan (PH)	People's Justice Party (PKR)	2015–present
Perikatan Nasional (PN)	Malaysian United Indigenous Party (BERSATU)	2020–present

=== Assistant Minister of Youth, Culture and Sports (1964–) ===
Portrait	Name (Birth–Death) Constituency	Political coalition	Political party	Took office	Left office	Prime Minister (Cabinet)
	Engku Muhsein Abdul Kadir (b.?); MP for Trengganu Tengah	Alliance	UMNO	1964		Tunku Abdul Rahman (III)
Post renamed into Assistant Minister of Culture, Youth and Sports
=== Assistant Minister of Culture, Youth and Sports ===
Portrait	Name (Birth–Death) Constituency	Political coalition	Political party	Took office	Left office	Prime Minister (Cabinet)
	Engku Muhsein Abdul Kadir (b.?); MP for Trengganu Tengah	Alliance	UMNO		1970	Tunku Abdul Rahman (III • IIII)
Post renamed into Deputy Minister of Culture, Youth and Sports
=== Deputy Minister of Culture, Youth and Sports ===
Portrait	Name (Birth–Death) Constituency	Political coalition	Political party	Took office	Left office	Prime Minister (Cabinet)
	Neo Yee Pan (1938–2020); MP for Muar	BN	MCA	March; 1976	31 December 1977	Hussein Onn (I)
	Mak Hon Kam (?–?); MP for Tanjong Malim	BN	MCA	1978		Hussein Onn (II)
	Chin Hon Ngian (?–?); MP for Renggam	BN	MCA		1982	Hussein Onn (II); Mahathir Mohamad (I)
	Rosemary Chow Poh Kheng (1927–2023); MP for Ulu Langat	BN	MCA	29 April 1982	10 August 1986	Mahathir Mohamad (II)
Post renamed into Deputy Minister of Youth and Sports
=== Deputy Minister of Youth and Sports ===
Portrait	Name (Birth–Death) Constituency	Political coalition	Political party	Took office	Left office	Prime Minister (Cabinet)
	Wang Choon Wing (?–?); MP for Lipis	BN	MCA	11 August 1986	14 August 1989	Mahathir Mohamad (III)
	Teng Gaik Kwan (?–?); MP for Raub	BN	MCA	20 May 1987	3 May 1995	Mahathir Mohamad (III • IIII)
	Loke Yuen Yow (b.1952); MP for Tanjong Malim	BN	MCA	8 May 1995	14 December 1999	Mahathir Mohamad (V)
	Ong Tee Keat (b.1956); MP for Ampang Jaya (1989–2004); MP for Pandan (2004–2013)	BN	MCA	15 December 1999	14 February 2006	Mahathir Mohamad (VI); Abdullah Ahmad Badawi (I • II)
	Liow Tiong Lai (b.1961); MP for Bentong	BN	MCA	14 February 2006	18 March 2008	Abdullah Ahmad Badawi (II)
	Wee Jeck Seng (b.1964); MP for Tanjong Piai	BN	MCA	19 March 2008	9 April 2009	Abdullah Ahmad Badawi (III)
	Razali Ibrahim (b.1970); MP for Muar	BN	UMNO	10 April 2009	15 May 2013	Najib Razak (I)
	Wee Jeck Seng (b.1964); MP for Tanjong Piai	BN	MCA	10 April 2009	4 June 2010	Najib Razak (I)
	Gan Ping Sieu (b.1966); Senator	BN	MCA	4 June 2010	15 May 2013	Najib Razak (I)
	Saravanan Murugan (b.1968); MP for Tapah	BN	MIC	16 May 2013	9 May 2018	Najib Razak (II)
	Steven Sim Chee Keong (b.1982); MP for Bukit Mertajam	PH	DAP	2 July 2018	24 February 2020	Mahathir Mohamad (VII)
	Wan Ahmad Fayhsal Wan Ahmad Kamal (b.1987); Senator	PN	BERSATU	10 March 2020	16 August 2021	Muhyiddin Yassin (I)
	Ti Lian Ker (b.1962); Senator	BN	MCA	30 August 2021	24 November 2022	Ismail Sabri Yaakob (I)
	Adam Adli Abdul Halim (b.1989); MP for Hang Tuah Jaya	PH	PKR	10 December 2022	Incumbent	Anwar Ibrahim (I)

== See also ==
- Minister of Youth and Sports (Malaysia)
