= Sekolah Menengah Sains Sultan Mahmud =

School in Kuala Nerus, Terengganu, Malaysia

Coordinates: 5.3607348°N 103.0926625°E

Sultan Mahmud Science School
- Sekolah Menengah Sains Sultan Mahmud سكوله منڠه ساءين س سلطان محمود
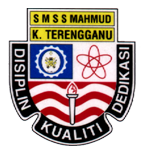

Location
- 21300; Kuala Nerus, Terengganu; Malaysia

Information
- Former names: Terengganu Science School (1973-1982) Sultan Mahmud School (1982-1995)
- Type: Private School, Fully Residential School
- Motto: Disiplin, Kualiti, Dedikasi (Discipline, Quality, Dedication)
- Established: 20 January 1973
- Founder: Sultan Ismail Nasiruddin of Terengganu
- School district: Kuala Nerus
- Session: Single Session
- School code: TEE7001
- Principal: Pn. Hayati A. Rahman
- Grades: Form 1 — Form 5
- Gender: Male and Female
- Enrollment: About 660
- Classes: 5 (each forms)
- Classes offered: STEM A
- Language: Malay, English, French, Japanese, Arabic, Chinese
- Hours in school day: 8 Hours
- Campuses: Asrama SM Sains Sultan Mahmud
- Houses: Tun Sri Lanang Tun Mutahir Tun Tuah Tun Perak
- Colors: Red & Yellow
- Sports: Rugby, basketball, cricket, football
- National ranking: 4 (SBP)
- Yearbook: SAINTIS
- School fees: RM1020 (Estimated)
- Affiliations: Sekolah Berasrama Penuh, Ministry of Education (Malaysia)
- Alumni: Alumni MySESMA
- GINI Index: ▼48.8 High Inequality
- Website: http://sesma.edu.my/

Sekolah Menengah Sains Sultan Mahmud (transl. Sultan Mahmud Science School; abbreviated SESMA) is one of the boarding schools in Malaysia. The school is located at Wakaf Tembesu, Kuala Nerus, Terengganu between Sekolah Menengah Teknik Terengganu and Kolej Vokasional Wakaf Tembesu.

It was established in 1973 under the name of Sekolah Menengah Sains Terengganu (transl. Terengganu Science Secondary School) to accommodate the needs of students who want to take Science majors as fields to be pursued in the future especially to rural students.

== Location ==
SESMA is located on an area of 21.5 acres in Mukim Wakaf Tembesu, Kuala Terengganu. Traveling from Kuala Terengganu to SESMA takes between 10 and 15 minutes through the Sultan Mahmud Bridge while Manir Bridge takes about 20 to 30 minutes.

== History ==
SESMA started her study session in January 1973 by sharing facilities at Padang Midin Secondary School, Kuala Terengganu. The students are also housed at the Yayasan Terengganu Foundation, Jalan Negara, Kuala Terengganu. In October 1974, a new building in Mukim Wakaf Tembesu was first used and known as Sekolah Menengah Sains Terengganu (SMST).

The official opening of the school was carried out by DYMM Sultan Ismail Nasiruddin Shah ibni Almarhum Sultan Zainal Abidin on September 5, 1979. On September 18, 1982 the school changed its name to Sekolah Sultan Mahmud Kuala Terengganu which was officiated by DYMM Sultan Mahmud Al Muktafi Billah Shah Ibni Almarhum Sultan Ismail Nasiruddin Shah . In 1995 the school was once again given a new name, Sekolah Menengah Sains Sultan Mahmud (SESMA), Kuala Terengganu which illustrates the importance of science subject in the current school curriculum.

The first principal is Mr. Hj Muhamad Bin Mustaffa while Mr. Johari Shamsuddin as Senior Assistant. The pioneering group of 109 students consisted of 51 males and 58 females with 5 male teachers and 2 female teachers. In 1978, the first intake of Matriculation students of 90 students organized by Universiti Kebangsaan Malaysia (UKM) was held. SESMA began entering the digital era when it became one of the Smart Schools under the development plan of the Ministry of Education in 1999.

Students at SESMA follow lessons in several streams. At the Secondary level, only pure science flow is provided. Beginning in 1989, life skills courses were introduced to replace corporate art and home science studies. Computer classes are compulsory to form one to four students. French subjects were introduced in 1996 to lower secondary students while Japanese in 1997.

The teaching and learning facilities are adequate. In addition to science laboratories, life skills workshops, ERT rooms and libraries there are additional facilities such as language laboratories, computer rooms, Multimedia labs and Resource Center. From time to time, the school will add more facilities to the benefit of its students.

== Notable alumni ==
- Ahmad Samsuri Mokhtar - 15th Menteri Besar of Terengganu
- Yahaya Ali - 15th Speaker of the Terengganu State Legislative Assembly
- Ahmad Amzad Hashim - Former Deputy Minister of Minister of Science, Technology and Innovation
- Dr Mohd Firdaus Samsudin Mustapha - First Terengganu born to graduate from University of Oxford

== See also ==
- Sekolah Berasrama Penuh
