= Ahmad Sidi Ismail =

Malaysian politician

Yang Berbahagia Dato' Haji Ahmad Sidi Ismail DSMT KMN SMT PJC PJK JP
- احمد سيدي اسماعيل

Exco roles (Terengganu)
- 1980–1982: Youth, Sports and Culture
- 1982–1987: Public Works and Infrastructure Development
- 1987–1990: Public Works
- 1990–1995: Public Facilities and Special Functions

Faction represented in Terengganu State Legislative Assembly
- 1980–1995: Barisan Nasional

Personal details
- Born: 1942 (age 83–84) Kuala Berang, Terengganu, Japanese occupation of Malaya (now Malaysia)
- Citizenship: Malaysian
- Party: United Malays National Organization (UMNO)
- Other political affiliations: Barisan Nasional (BN); Perikatan Nasional (PN); Muafakat Nasional (MN)
- Spouse: Safiah Muhammad Zain
- Relations: Alias Ali (stepbrother)
- Occupation: Politician

Haji Ahmad Sidi Ismail is a Malaysian politician and was the member of Terengganu State Legislative Assembly for Telemung constituency in Terengganu from 1974 to 1995, sitting as a member of the United Malays National Organisation (UMNO) party in the ruling Barisan Nasional coalition. He declined to seek re-election in 1995 even though he was invited to be the next Member of Parliament candidate for Hulu Terengganu under UMNO.

== Election results ==
Terengganu State Legislative Assembly
| Year | Constituency | Candidate | Votes | Pct | Opponent(s) | Votes | Pct | Ballots cast | Majority | Turnout |
|---|---|---|---|---|---|---|---|---|---|---|
| 1974 | Telemung | Ahmad Sidi Ismail (UMNO) | | | | | | | | |
| 1978 | Telemung | Ahmad Sidi Ismail (UMNO) | | | | | | | | |
| 1982 | Telemung | Ahmad Sidi Ismail (UMNO) | | | | | | | | |
| 1986 | N21 Telemung | Ahmad Sidi Ismail (UMNO) | 3,672 | 65.55% | Jusoh Othman | 1,930 | 34.45% | 5,895 | 1,742 | 86.79% |
| 1990 | N21 Telemung | Ahmad Sidi Ismail (UMNO) | 4,198 | 64.74% | Aziz Ahmad (S46) | 2,286 | 35.26% | 6,764 | 1,912 | 88.40% |

== Awards ==
- Malaysia
  - Officer of the Order of the Defender of the Realm (KMN) (1979)
- Terengganu
  - Knight Commander of the Order of the Crown of Terengganu (DPMT) – Dato' (1984)
  - Distinguished Service Medal (PJC) (1986)
  - Member Knight Companion of the Order of Sultan Mahmud I of Terengganu (DSMT) – Dato' (1992)

== See also ==
- Telemung (state constituency)
- Alias Ali
