= Rozi Mamat =

Malaysian politician

Yang Berbahagia Dato' Rozi Mamat DPMT SMZ
- راضي مامت

Member of the Terengganu State Executive Council (Agriculture and Agro-Based Industry : 9 April 2008–1 July 2010) (Youth and Sports : 1 July 2010–10 May 2013) (Youth, Sports and Human Resources : 11 May 2013–10 May 2018)
- In office 9 April 2008 – 10 May 2018
- Monarch: Mizan Zainal Abidin
- Menteri Besar: Ahmad Said (2008–2014); Ahmad Razif Abdul Rahman (2014–2018)
- Deputy: Muhammad Pehimi Yusof (2008–2010); Alias Abdullah (2010–2013)
- Preceded by: Mohd Jidin Shafee
- Succeeded by: Wan Sukairi Wan Abdullah (Youth and Sports); Mohd Nor Hamzah (Human Resources)
- Constituency: Telemung

Member of the Terengganu State Legislative Assembly for Telemung
- In office 21 March 2004 – 12 August 2023
- Preceded by: Tengku Putera Tengku Awang (BN–UMNO)
- Succeeded by: Mohd Zawawi Ismail (PN–BERSATU)
- Majority: 4,240 (2004); 5,893 (2008); 6,864 (2013); 4,159 (2018)

State Chairman of the United Malays National Organisation of Terengganu
- Incumbent
- Assumed office 7 December 2023
- President: Ahmad Zahid Hamidi
- Deputy: Nik Dir Nik Wan Ku
- Preceded by: Ahmad Said

Faction represented in Terengganu State Legislative Assembly
- 2004–2023: Barisan Nasional

Personal details
- Born: Terengganu, Malaysia
- Citizenship: Malaysian
- Party: United Malays National Organisation (UMNO)
- Other political affiliations: Barisan Nasional (BN)
- Occupation: Politician

Rozi bin Mamat is a Malaysian politician who served as Member of the Terengganu State Executive Council (EXCO) in the Barisan Nasional (BN) state administration under former Menteris Besar Ahmad Said and Ahmad Razif Abdul Rahman from April 2008 to the collapse of the BN state administration in May 2018 as well as Member of the Terengganu State Legislative Assembly (MLA) for Telemung from March 2004 to August 2023. He is a member and the Division Chief of Hulu Terengganu of the United Malays National Organisation (UMNO), a component party of the BN coalition. He has served as the State Chairman of UMNO of Terengganu since December 2023.

== Election results ==
Terengganu State Legislative Assembly
Year	Constituency	Candidate	Votes	Pct	Opponent(s)	Votes	Pct	Ballots cast	Majority	Turnout
2004	N21 Telemung	Rozi Mamat (UMNO)	7,276	70.56%	Kamaruzaman Abdullah (keADILan)	3,036	29.44%	10,449	4,240	90.33%
2008	N21 Telemung	Rozi Mamat (UMNO)	8,619	75.97%	Engku Abu Bakar Engku Mohd (PKR)	2,726	24.03%	11,664	5,893	87.86%
2013	N21 Telemung	Rozi Mamat (UMNO)	10,262	75.12%	Narawi Embong (PKR)	3,398	24.88%	13,964	6,864	88.90%
2018	N21 Telemung	Rozi Mamat (UMNO)	9,407	62.26%	Kamaruzaman Abdullah (PAS)	5,248	34.73%	15,387	4,159	86.10%
2018	N21 Telemung	Rozi Mamat (UMNO)	9,407	62.26%	Sharifah Norhayati Syed Omar (PKR)	455	3.01%	15,387	4,159	86.10%
2023	N21 Telemung	Rozi Mamat (UMNO)	8,085	49.10%	Mohd Zawawi Ismail (BERSATU)	8,380	50.90%	16,465	295	76.60%

Parliament of Malaysia
Year	Constituency		Votes	Pct	Opponent(s)	Votes	Pct	Ballots cast	Majority	Turnout
2022	P038 Hulu Terengganu	Rozi Mamat (UMNO)	27,176	37.74%	Rosol Wahid (BERSATU)	42,910	59.59%	72,008	15,734	81.90%
2022	P038 Hulu Terengganu	Rozi Mamat (UMNO)	27,176	37.74%	Alias Ismail (PKR)	1,740	2.42%	72,008	15,734	81.90%
2022	P038 Hulu Terengganu	Rozi Mamat (UMNO)	27,176	37.74%	Mohd Qadri Abdullah (PEJUANG)	182	0.25%	72,008	15,734	81.90%

== Honours ==
- Terengganu
  - Knight Commander of the Order of the Crown of Terengganu (DPMT) – Dato' (2014)
  - Companion of the Order of Sultan Mizan Zainal Abidin of Terengganu (SMZ) (2012)
  - Member of the Order of the Crown of Terengganu (AMT) (2007)
