= Neo Yee Pan =

Malaysian politician (1938–2020)

Yang Berhormat (Note: The prefix "Yang Berhormat" is used for recipients of the First and Second Classes of the Johor's Orders of Chivalry.) Dato' Neo Yee Pan SPMJ DPMJ
- 梁维泮

Minister of Housing and Local Government
- In office 1979–1985
- Prime Minister: Hussein Onn; Mahathir Mohamad
- Deputy: Ramli Omar (19?–19?); Samy Vellu (1978–1979); Zakaria Abdul Rahman (19?–19?); Abdul Jalal Abu Bakar (1981–1982); Napsiah Omar; Subramaniam Sinniah (1982–1985)
- Preceded by: Michael Chen Wing Sum
- Succeeded by: Chan Siang Sun
- Constituency: Muar

Deputy Minister of Culture, Youth and Sports
- In office 1976–1977
- Monarch: Yahya Petra
- Prime Minister: Hussein Onn
- Minister: Ali Ahmad
- Preceded by: Engku Muhsein Abdul Kadir as Assistant Minister of Culture, Youth and Sports
- Succeeded by: Mak Hon Kam
- Constituency: Muar

Deputy Minister of Finance
- In office 1977–1979
- Monarch: Yahya Petra
- Prime Minister: Hussein Onn
- Minister: Tengku Razaleigh Hamzah
- Preceded by: Richard Ho Ung Hun
- Succeeded by: Mak Hon Kam
- Constituency: Muar

Parliamentary Secretary of the Ministry of Energy, Technology and Research
- In office 1974–1976
- Monarchs: Abdul Halim; Yahya Petra
- Prime Minister: Abdul Razak Hussein
- Minister: Mohamed Yaacob
- Deputy Minister: None
- Preceded by: Portfolio established
- Succeeded by: Law Hieng Ding as Parliamentary Secretary of the Ministry of Science, Technology and Environment
- Constituency: Muar

Member of the Malaysian Parliament for Muar
- In office 24 August 1974 – 3 August 1986
- Preceded by: new constituency
- Succeeded by: Mohamed Sam Sailan (BN–UMNO)
- Majority: 17,466 (1974); 12,355 (1978); 15,581 (1982)

Personal details
- Born: 1938 Muar, Johor, Unfederated Malay States
- Died: 5 March 2020 (aged 81–82)

Neo Yee Pan (1938 – 5 March 2020) was a Malaysian politician, former Member of Parliament representing Muar (1974–1983) former Secretary General (1975–1979) and acting President of the MCA in Malaysia (1983–1984). He served as Housing and Local Government Minister, as well as a number of other Deputy roles in government. During his brief tenure as Acting MCA President, Pan and his associates used their power to expel several leading party members who had questioned the official party membership numbers, resulting in a leadership crises that ended when one of the expelled leaders, Tan Koon Swan, was formally elected as the new president of the party.

== Political career ==
Neo was elected as a member of the MCA Central Working Committee and appointed Deputy Secretary-General on 11 August 1973. Next year, in 1974, he successfully elected for parliament in Muar, and was appointed the Parliamentary Secretary of the Ministry of Energy, Technology and Research.

=== Acting Presidency and Membership Crisis ===
On 25 March 1983, MCA President Lee San Choon announced his resignation and on May 1 formally left the office and Malaysian politics. Pan became the acting president. A crisis in the leadership stemmed from allegations of membership inflation within the party. Several party leaders moved for an investigation into the matter. On March 19, 1983, Pan and his deputy Mak Hon Kam dismissed several committee chairman and members, as well as party leaders at varying levels, including Vice President Tan Koon Swan. The expelled members were reinstated at an extraordinary general party meeting in May 1983. The following year, May 1984, Tan Koon Swan was elected to the MCA presidency, ending Pan's tenure.

== Election results ==
Parliament of Malaysia
Year	Constituency	Candidate	Votes	Pct	Opponent(s)	Votes	Pct	Ballots cast	Majority	Turnout
1974	P106 Muar	Neo Yee Pan (MCA)	23,039	80.52%	Khoo Sim Geok (DAP)	5,573	19.48%	29,841	17,466	71.87%
1978	P106 Muar	Neo Yee Pan (MCA)	23,538	63.40%	Ho Chan Mee (DAP)	11,183	30.12%	24,324	12,355	77.83%
1978	P106 Muar	Neo Yee Pan (MCA)	23,538	63.40%	Ahmad Abdul Rahman (PAS)	2,405	6.48%	24,324	12,355	77.83%
1982	P106 Muar	Neo Yee Pan (MCA)	27,572	66.58%	Tan Yang Ngai (DAP)	11,991	28.95%	43,902	15,581	75.70%
1982	P106 Muar	Neo Yee Pan (MCA)	27,572	66.58%	Mohamad Anang (PAS)	1,851	4.47%	43,902	15,581	75.70%

== Honours ==
- Johor
  - Knight Grand Commander of the Order of the Crown of Johor (SPMJ) – Dato' (1979)
  - Knight Commander of the Order of the Crown of Johor (DPMJ) – Dato' (1977)
