= Speaker of the Terengganu State Legislative Assembly =

Presiding officer of the legislature of Terengganu

- Yang di-Pertua Dewan Undangan Negeri Terengganu
- Coat of arms of Terengganu
- Incumbent; Mohd Nor Hamzah since 24 September 2023
- Terengganu State Legislative Assembly
- Style: Yang Berhormat; Tuan Yang di-Pertua (formal); Tuan Speaker/Tuan Pengerusi (informal and within the assembly)
- Member of: Committee of Rights and Freedoms, Committee of House Management Select, Committee of the Standing Rules State Assembly
- Reports to: Terengganu State Legislative Assembly
- Seat: Wisma Darul Iman, Kuala Terengganu, Terengganu
- Appointer: Elected by members of the Terengganu State Legislative Assembly
- Term length: Elected at the start of each Terengganu State Legislative Assembly, upon a vacancy
- Constituting instrument: Constitution of Terengganu
- Inaugural holder: Engku Muhsein Abdul Kadir
- Formation: 1 June 1958; 68 years ago
- Deputy: Deputy Speaker of the Terengganu State Legislative Assembly
- Website: dun.terengganu.gov.my

The Speaker of the Terengganu State Legislative Assembly is the highest-ranking presiding officer in the Terengganu State Legislative Assembly, the unicameral legislature of the Malaysian state of Terengganu. They are responsible for convening sessions of the state's legislative body, organising debates, and examining the admissibility of petitions, bills and amendments. In the absence of the Speaker, the deputy will take their place. The speaker is selected through ballot in the first session of a new legislative assembly.

The incumbent Speaker is Mohd Nor Hamzah. He was elected since 24 September 2023.

== Election ==
The Terengganu State Legislative Assembly may from time to time elect a person of eligibility to become a Speaker of the assembly. A speaker may not be elected to be a Speaker unless he is a member or qualified to be a member of the legislative assembly. The speaker may resign at any time. He must vacate his office when either the legislative assembly first meet after a general election, or upon being disqualified to be a speaker, or upon the dissolution of the assembly, or on his ceasing to be a member of assembly other than because of the dissolution of the legislative assembly or ceased to be qualified of a member. A Deputy Speaker may also be chosen from any member of the legislative assembly.

== List of Speakers of the Terengganu State Legislative Assembly ==
The following is the list of Speakers of the State Legislative Assembly since 1958:

Colour key (for political parties):
Alliance / Barisan Nasional Pan-Malaysian Islamic Party Barisan Alternatif Gagasan Sejahtera Perikatan Nasional

No.	Portrait	Name (Birth–Death) (Constituency)	Term of office			Party (Note: This column names only the Speaker's party. The state legislaltive assembly he heads may be a complex coalition of several parties and independents; those are not listed here.)	Election	Assembly
No.	Portrait	Name (Birth–Death) (Constituency)	Took office	Left office	Time in office	Party	Election	Assembly
1.		Dato'; Engku Muhsein Abdul Kadir (?–?); MLA for	1 June 1958	30 April 1959	334 days	Alliance (UMNO)	–	–
2.		Haji; Mohd Taib Sabri Abu Bakar (b.?); MLA for Marang	27 July 1959	31 December 1963	4 years, 158 days	PMIP	1959	1st
3.		Dato' Haji; Mohd Taha Embong (b.?); MLA for Chukai	11 May 1964	27 October 1967	3 years, 170 days	Alliance (UMNO)	1964	2nd
4.		Dato'; Che Wan Abd. Ghani Zainal (?–?); MLA for Kemaman Utara	28 November 1967	20 March 1969	1 year, 113 days	Alliance (UMNO)	–	2nd
5.		Dato'; Abd. Rahman Long (?–?); MLA for Langkap	1 May 1971	31 July 1974	3 years, 92 days	Alliance (UMNO)	1969	3rd
6.		Dato'; Abdullah Abd. Rahman (?–?); MLA for Batu Rakit	27 October 1974	12 June 1978	3 years, 229 days	BN (UMNO)	1974	4th
7.		Dato' Haji; Mohd Salleh Ismail (?–?); MLA for Tanggol	30 July 1978	29 March 1982	3 years, 243 days	BN (UMNO)	1978	5th
8.		Dato' Haji; Husin Abdullah (b.?); Non-MLA	14 June 1982	18 July 1986	4 years, 35 days	BN (UMNO)	1982	6th
9.		Dato'; Syed Omar Mohamad (?–?); MLA for Paka; Non-MLA	8 September 1986	11 November 1996	10 years, 65 days	BN (UMNO)	1986	7th
9.		Dato'; Syed Omar Mohamad (?–?); MLA for Paka; Non-MLA	8 September 1986	11 November 1996	10 years, 65 days	BN (UMNO)	1990	8th
9.		Dato'; Syed Omar Mohamad (?–?); MLA for Paka; Non-MLA	8 September 1986	11 November 1996	10 years, 65 days	BN (UMNO)	1995	9th
10.		Dato' Haji; Abdul Rahman Mohd (?–?); Non-MLA	24 November 1996	19 December 1999	3 years, 26 days	BN (UMNO)	–	9th
11.		Dato' Haji; Husain Awang (?–?); Non-MLA	20 December 1999	31 March 2004	4 years, 103 days	BA (PAS)	1999	10th
12.		Dato' Haji; Che Mat Jusoh (b.?); Non-MLA	11 April 2004	13 February 2008	3 years, 309 days	BN (UMNO)	2004	11th
13.		Dato'; Tengku Putera Tengku Awang (b.?); Non-MLA	5 May 2008	18 April 2013	4 years, 349 days	BN (UMNO)	2008	12th
14.		Dato' Haji; Mohd Zubir Embong (b.?); Non-MLA	16 June 2013	30 June 2018	5 years, 15 days	BN (UMNO)	2013	13th
15.		Dato' Haji; Yahaya Ali (b.?); Non-MLA	1 July 2018	23 September 2023	5 years, 85 days	GS (PAS)	2018	14th
15.		Dato' Haji; Yahaya Ali (b.?); Non-MLA	1 July 2018	23 September 2023	5 years, 85 days	PN (PAS)	–	14th
16.		Dato' Haji; Mohd Nor Hamzah (b.?); MLA for Bukit Payung	24 September 2023	Incumbent	2 years, 350 days	PN (PAS)	2023	15th

== See also ==
- Terengganu
- Terengganu State Legislative Assembly
