= Alias Ali =

Malaysian politician

Yang Berbahagia Dato' Haji Alias Md Ali DPMT JSM
- الياس مد علي

Deputy Minister of Primary Industries
- In office 1987–1990
- Monarchs: Iskandar; Azlan Shah
- Prime Minister: Mahathir Mohamad
- Minister: Lim Keng Yaik
- Preceded by: Mohd Radzi Sheikh Ahmad
- Succeeded by: Tengku Mahmud Tengku Mansor
- Constituency: Hulu Terengganu

Member of the Malaysian Parliament for Hulu Terengganu
- In office 31 July 1978 – 6 April 1995
- Preceded by: Engku Muhsein Abdul Kadir (UMNO–BN)
- Succeeded by: Mustafa Muda
- Majority: 4,370 (1978); 2,442 (1982); 5,036 (1986); 2,512 (1990)

Personal details
- Born: Alias bin Md Ali; 1939 Kuala Berang, Terengganu, Malaysia
- Died: 10 March 2014 (aged 75) Ampang, Selangor
- Resting place: Kampung Kemensah Muslim cemetery
- Party: UMNO
- Other political affiliations: Barisan Nasional (BN)
- Spouse: Ramlah Abdul Rahman
- Relations: Ahmad Sidi Ismail (stepbrother)
- Children: 5
- Education: Iowa State University
- Occupation: Politician, Journalist

Haji Alias Md Ali (c. 1939 – 10 March 2014) was a Malaysian politician and former news editor of Bernama. He served as an MP for Hulu Terengganu from 1978 to 1995. He was also the former chairman of Agro Bank Malaysia.

== Personal life ==
Alias Md Ali was born in Kuala Berang, Terengganu. He received a bachelor's degree in creative writing from Iowa State University in the US. In 1950, he was elected the leader of the Hulu Terengganu UMNO Youth. In 1960, he was appointed as the vice-chairman of the Terengganu Tengah Development Authority.

In 1957, Alias began his career as a reporter for Berita Harian. He then joined the staff of the Utusan Melayu newspaper, where he became the paper's chief news editor from 1968 to 1970. In 1970, Alias Ali became the chief sub-editor of Bernama's Malaysian language division. He was later promoted to editor of the General News Service of Bernama. He resigned from Bernama in 1978 to enter politics.

== Political career ==
In 1978, Alias was elected to the Parliament of Malaysia for the Hulu Terengganu constituency as a member of the United Malays National Organisation (UMNO). He defeated his opponent, Mohd Ghazali Ahmad of the Pan-Malaysian Islamic Party (PAS), by 4,370 votes. He was re-elected to Parliament from Hulu Terengganu in the next four general elections. He was appointed as the Deputy Minister of Primary Industries from 1987 to 1990. Alias declined to seek re-election in 1995 and retired from office.

== Death ==
Alias died from colon cancer at his son's home in Prima Villa, Kemensah Heights, Ampang, on 10 March 2014, at the age of 75. He was survived by his wife, To' Puan Ramlah Datuk Abdul Rahman; two sons; three daughters; and fifteen grandchildren.

== Election results ==
Parliament of Malaysia
Year	Constituency	Candidate	Votes	Pct	Opponent(s)	Votes	Pct	Ballots cast	Majority	Turnout
1978	P030 Ulu Trengganu	Alias Md Ali (UMNO)	12,001	61.13%	Mohamed Ghazali Ahmad (PAS)	7,631	38.87%		4,370	
1982	P030 Ulu Trengganu	Alias Md Ali (UMNO)	12,771	55.29%	Ahmad Awang (PAS)	10,329	44.71%	24,318	2,442	83.90%
1986	P035 Hulu Terengganu	Alias Md Ali (UMNO)	14,291	60.69%	Kasim Ahmad (PAS)	9,255	39.31%	24,330	5,036	84.07%
1990	P035 Hulu Terengganu	Alias Md Ali (UMNO)	15,443	54.43%	Harun Taib (PAS)	12,931	45.47%	29,086	2,512	86.72%

== Honours ==
=== Honours of Malaysia ===
- Malaysia
  - Companion of the Order of Loyalty to the Crown of Malaysia (JSM) (1991)
- Terengganu
  - Knight Commander of the Order of the Crown of Terengganu (DPMT) – Dato' (1988)

== Books ==
- Gersang, (1964)
- Krisis, (1966)
- Selasih Ku Sayang, (1967)
- Kalau Berpaut Di Dahan Rapuh, (1967)
- Adat Muda Menanggung Rindu, (1971)

== See also ==
- Hulu Terengganu (federal constituency)
- Ahmad Sidi Ismail
