= Yahaya Ali =

Malaysian politician

Yang Berhormat Dato' Yahaya Ali DPMT PJC
- يحيى بن علي

Speaker of the Terengganu State Legislative Assembly
- In office 1 July 2018 – 28 June 2023
- Monarch: Mizan Zainal Abidin
- Menteri Besar: Ahmad Samsuri Mokhtar
- Preceded by: Mohd Zubir Embong
- Succeeded by: Mohd Nor Hamzah

Exco roles (Terengganu)
- 1999–2004: Chairman of Public Works, Infrastructure and Communications Committee

Faction represented in Terengganu State Legislative Assembly
- 1995–2004: Malaysian Islamic Party

Personal details
- Born: 1959 (age 66–67) Terengganu, Malaysia
- Citizenship: Malaysian
- Party: Malaysian Islamic Party (PAS)
- Other political affiliations: Perikatan Nasional (PN); Muafakat Nasional (MN); Gagasan Sejahtera (GS); Pakatan Rakyat (PR); Barisan Alternatif (BA); Angkatan Perpaduan Ummah (APU)
- Education: Sekolah Menengah Sains Sultan Mahmud
- Occupation: Politician

Yang Berhormat Dato' Yahaya bin Ali (born 1959) is a Malaysian politician who served as Speaker of the Terengganu State Legislative Assembly from July 2018 to June 2023. He is a member of the Malaysian Islamic Party (PAS), a component party of the Perikatan Nasional (PN) coalition.

== Election results ==
Terengganu State Legislative Assembly
Year	Constituency	Candidate	Votes	Pct	Opponent(s)	Votes	Pct	Ballots cast	Majority	Turnout
1995	N17 Alur Limbat	Yahaya Ali (PAS)	5,535	51.25%	Azmi Ahmad (UMNO)	5,266	48.75%	11,102	269	80.08%
1999	N17 Alur Limbat	Yahaya Ali (PAS)	7,575	63.79%	Alias Abdullah (UMNO)	4,300	36.21%	12,203	3,275	82.61%
2004	N17 Alur Limbat	Yahaya Ali (PAS)	6,673	46.02%	Alias Abdullah (UMNO)	7,826	53.98%	14,794	1,153	88.10%

== Honours ==
- Terengganu
  - Knight Commander of the Order of the Crown of Terengganu (DPMT) – Dato' (2019)
