= Rosol Wahid =

Malaysian politician (born 1964)

Yang Berhormat Dato' Rosol Wahid DPMT SMT MP
- رسول بن واحد
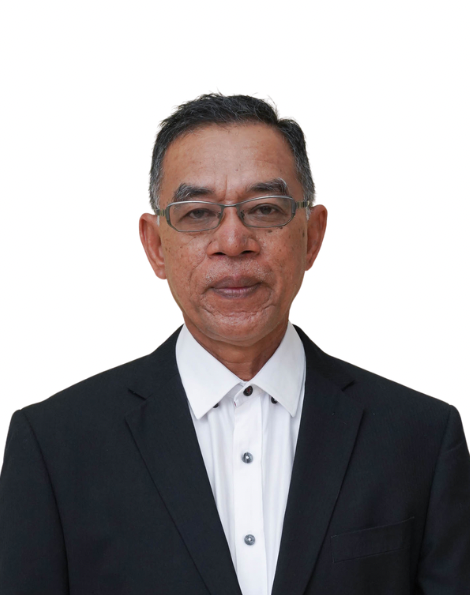
- Rosol on 2026

Deputy Minister of Domestic Trade and Consumer Affairs
- In office 30 August 2021 – 24 November 2022
- Monarch: Abdullah
- Prime Minister: Ismail Sabri Yaakob
- Minister: Alexander Nanta Linggi
- Preceded by: Himself
- Succeeded by: Fuziah Salleh (Deputy Minister of Domestic Trade and Costs of Living)
- Constituency: Hulu Terengganu
- In office 10 March 2020 – 16 August 2021
- Monarch: Abdullah
- Prime Minister: Muhyiddin Yassin
- Minister: Alexander Nanta Linggi
- Preceded by: Chong Chieng Jen
- Succeeded by: Himself
- Constituency: Hulu Terengganu

Member of the Malaysian Parliament for Hulu Terengganu
- Incumbent
- Assumed office 9 May 2018
- Preceded by: Jailani Johari (BN–UMNO)
- Majority: 2,868 (2018); 15,734 (2022)

Member of the Terengganu State Legislative Assembly for Ajil
- In office 29 November 1999 – 5 May 2013
- Preceded by: Othman Daud (BN–UMNO)
- Succeeded by: Ghazali Taib (BN–UMNO)
- Majority: 125 (1999); 3,783 (1999); 4,727 (2008)

Exco roles (Terengganu)
- 2004–2006: Chairman of the Welfare, Health, Social Development and Women Affairs
- 2006–2008: Chairman of the Welfare and Islam Hadhari
- 2008–2013: Deputy Chairman of the Rural Development, Entrepreneurs and Cooperative

Faction represented in Terengganu State Legislative Assembly
- 1999–2013: Barisan Nasional

Faction represented in Dewan Rakyat
- 2018: Barisan Nasional
- 2018–2019: Independent
- 2019–2020: Pakatan Harapan
- 2020: Malaysian United Indigenous Party
- 2020–: Perikatan Nasional

Personal details
- Born: Rosol bin Wahid; 10 July 1964 (age 61) Sura Tengah, Dungun, Terengganu, Malaysia
- Party: United Malays National Organisation (UMNO) (1989–2018); Malaysian United Indigenous Party (BERSATU) (since 2019)
- Other political affiliations: Barisan Nasional (BN) (1989–2018); Pakatan Harapan (PH) (2019–2020); Perikatan Nasional (PN) (since 2020)
- Occupation: Politician
- Website: www.rosolwahid.com

Rosol bin Wahid (Jawi: رسول بن واحد; born 10 July 1964) is a Malaysian politician who has served as the Member of Parliament (MP) for Hulu Terengganu since May 2018. He served as the Deputy Minister of Domestic Trade and Consumer Affairs for the second term in the Barisan Nasional (BN) administration under former Prime Minister Ismail Sabri Yaakob and former Minister Alexander Nanta Linggi from August 2021 to the collapse of the BN administration in November 2022 and the first term in the Perikatan Nasional (PN) administration under former Prime Minister Muhyiddin Yassin and former Minister from March 2020 to the collapse of the PN administration in August 2021, Member of the Terengganu State Legislative Assembly (MLA) for Ajil from November 1999 to May 2013. He is a member of the Malaysian United Indigenous Party (BERSATU), a component party of the PN administration and was a member of the United Malays National Organisation (UMNO), a component party of the Barisan Nasional (BN) coalition. He resigned from UMNO in 2018 and joined BERSATU, a component party of the formerly the Pakatan Harapan (PH) and presently the PN coalitions in 2019.

Rosol was elected as assemblyman for Ajil in the 1999 state election, 2004 state election and 2008 state election, but did not re-contest his seat in the 2013 state election.

== Election results ==
Terengganu State Legislative Assembly
Year	Constituency	Candidate	Votes	Pct	Opponent(s)	Votes	Pct	Ballots cast	Majority	Turnout
1999	N24 Ajil	Rosol Wahid (UMNO)	4,313	50.74%	Ismail Osman (PAS)	4,188	49.26%	8,809	125	84.63%
2004	N24 Ajil	Rosol Wahid (UMNO)	7,386	67.21%	Mohd Razki (PAS)	3,603	32.79%	11,131	3,783	88.64%
2008	N24 Ajil	Rosol Wahid (UMNO)	8,530	69.16%	Mohd Razki Alias (PAS)	3,803	30.84%	12,531	4,727	86.17%

Parliament of Malaysia
Year	Constituency	Candidate	Votes	Pct	Opponent(s)	Votes	Pct	Ballots cast	Majority	Turnout
2018	P038 Hulu Terengganu	Rosol Wahid (UMNO)	30,925	49.60%	Muhyidin Abdul Rashid (PAS)	28,057	45.00%	63,428	2,868	86.31%
2018	P038 Hulu Terengganu	Rosol Wahid (UMNO)	30,925	49.60%	Razali Idris (BERSATU)	3,364	5.40%	63,428	2,868	86.31%
2022	P038 Hulu Terengganu	Rosol Wahid (BERSATU)	42,910	59.59%	Rozi Mamat (UMNO)	27,176	37.74%	72,008	15.734	81.90%
2022	P038 Hulu Terengganu	Rosol Wahid (BERSATU)	42,910	59.59%	Alias Ismail (PKR)	1,740	2.42%	72,008	15.734	81.90%
2022	P038 Hulu Terengganu	Rosol Wahid (BERSATU)	42,910	59.59%	Mohd Qadri Abdullah (PUTRA)	182	0.25%	72,008	15.734	81.90%

== Honours ==
=== Honours of Malaysia ===
- Malaysia
  - Recipient of the 17th Yang di-Pertuan Agong Installation Medal (2024)
- Terengganu
  - Knight Commander of the Order of the Crown of Terengganu (DPMT) – Dato' (2005)
  - Companion of the Order of the Crown of Terengganu (SMT) (2004)

== See also ==
- Hulu Terengganu (federal constituency)
