= Hulu Terengganu (federal constituency) =

Federal constituency in Malaysia

Hulu Terengganu (P038)
Terengganu constituency

Federal constituency
- Legislature: Dewan Rakyat
- MP: Rosol Wahid; PN
- Constituency created: 1974
- First contested: 1974
- Last contested: 2022

Demographics
- Population (2020): 91,855
- Electors (2023): 88,484
- Area (km²): 3,973
- Pop. density (per km²): 23.1

Hulu Terengganu is a federal constituency in Kuala Nerus District and Hulu Terengganu District, Terengganu, Malaysia, that has been represented in the Dewan Rakyat since 1974.

The federal constituency was created in the 1974 redistribution and is mandated to return a single member to the Dewan Rakyat under the first past the post voting system.

== Demographics ==
Ethnic breakdown of Hulu Terengganu's electorate as of 2022
1. Malay (99.3%)
2. Chinese (0.40%)
3. Other ethnicities (0.30%)
4. Indian (0.00%)
Age breakdown of Hulu Terengganu's electorate as of 2022
1. 18-20 (6.22%)
2. 21-29 (22.4%)
3. 30-39 (27.1%)
4. 40-49 (17.6%)
5. 50-59 (12.1%)
6. 60-69 (8.96%)
7. 70-79 (4.11%)
8. 80-89 (1.31%)
9. above 90 (0.24%)
Gender breakdown of Hulu Terengganu's electorate as of 2022
1. Male (49.6%)
2. Female (50.4%)

== History ==
=== Polling districts ===
According to the federal gazette issued on 18 July 2023, the Hulu Terenggnu constituency is divided into 52 polling districts.

State constituency	Polling district	Code	Location
Telemung (N21)	Basung	038/21/01	SK Padang Setebu
Telemung (N21)	Teris	038/21/02	SK Teris
Telemung (N21)	Kuala Ping	038/21/03	SK Kuala Ping
Telemung (N21)	Payang Kayu	038/21/04	SK Sungai Buloh
Telemung (N21)	Tengkawang	038/21/05	SK Tengkawang
Telemung (N21)	Kuala Telemung	038/21/06	SK Kuala Telemong
Telemung (N21)	Nibung	038/21/07	SK Nibong
Telemung (N21)	Matang	038/21/08	SK Matang
Telemung (N21)	Pauh	038/21/09	SK Pauh
Telemung (N21)	Kuala Dura	038/21/10	SK Kuala Dura
Telemung (N21)	Dusun	038/21/11	SK Dusun
Telemung (N21)	Bukit Gemuruh	038/21/12	SK Bukit Gemuroh
Telemung (N21)	Sekayu	038/21/13	SK Padang Setar
Telemung (N21)	Tapah	038/21/14	SK Tapah
Telemung (N21)	Ceting	038/21/15	SK Cheting
Telemung (N21)	Kuala Jeneris	038/21/16	SK Kuala Jenderis
Manir (N22)	Kedai Manir	038/22/01	SK Manir
Manir (N22)	Beladau Kolam	038/22/02	SK Beladau Kolam
Manir (N22)	Durian Emas	038/22/03	SK Durian Mas
Manir (N22)	Pulau Bahagia	038/22/04	SK Pulau Bahagia
Manir (N22)	Pujuk	038/22/05	SMK Belara
Manir (N22)	Batu Hampar	038/22/06	SK Pulau Manis
Manir (N22)	Teluk Menara	038/22/07	SK Teluk Menara
Kuala Berang (N23)	Getang	038/23/01	SK Getang
Kuala Berang (N23)	Pasir Tinggi	038/23/02	SK Pasir Tinggi
Kuala Berang (N23)	Sungai Ular	038/23/03	SK Binjai Kertas
Kuala Berang (N23)	Tanggul	038/23/04	SK Tanggol
Kuala Berang (N23)	Bandar Kuala Berang	038/23/05	SK Kuala Berang
Kuala Berang (N23)	Bukit Tok Bat	038/23/06	SK Tengku Ampuan Intan
Kuala Berang (N23)	Telaga	038/28/07	SMK Telaga
Kuala Berang (N23)	Tanjung Putat	038/23/08	SMK Tengku Ampuan Intan
Kuala Berang (N23)	Langgar	038/23/09	SK Langgar
Kuala Berang (N23)	Kampung Buluh	038/23/10	SK Seri Buluh
Kuala Berang (N23)	Tapu	038/23/11	SK Tapu
Kuala Berang (N23)	Sungai Petai	038/23/12	SK Seri Berang
Kuala Berang (N23)	Tajin	038/23/13	SM Sains Hulu Terengganu
Ajil (N24)	Bukit Perah	038/24/01	SK Bukit Perah
Ajil (N24)	Bukit Apit	038/24/02	SK Bukit Apit
Ajil (N24)	Tok Randok	038/23/03	SK Tok Randok
Ajil (N24)	Pengkalan Ajal	038/24/04	SK Kua
Ajil (N24)	Bukit Diman	038/24/05	SK Bukit Diman
Ajil (N24)	Bukit Bading	038/24/06	SK LKTP Bukit Bading
Ajil (N24)	Landas	038/24/07	SMK Landas
Ajil (N24)	Peruh	038/24/08	SK Peroh
Ajil (N24)	Menerung	038/24/09	SK Menerong
Ajil (N24)	Lubuk Periuk	038/24/10	SK Lubuk Periok
Ajil (N24)	Pekan Ajil	038/24/11	SK Ajil
Ajil (N24)	FELDA Tersat	038/24/12	SK (FELDA) Tersat
Ajil (N24)	FELDA Jerangau Barat	038/24/13	SK (FELDA) Jerangau Barat
Ajil (N24)	Pereh	038/24/14	SK Pereh
Ajil (N24)	Betung	038/24/15	SK Betong
Ajil (N24)	FELDA Mengkawang	038/24/16	SK (FELDA) Mengkawang

=== Representation history ===
Members of Parliament for Hulu Terengganu
Parliament	No	Years	Member	Party	Vote Share
Constituency created, renamed from Trengganu Tengah
Ulu Trengganu
4th	P030	1974–1978	Engku Muhsein Abdul Kadir (أڠكو محسن عبدالقادر)	BN (UMNO)	11,070; 64.35%
5th	P030	1978–1982	Alias Md. Ali (ألياس مد علي)	BN (UMNO)	12,001; 61.13%
6th	P030	1982–1986	Alias Md. Ali (ألياس مد علي)	BN (UMNO)	12,771; 55.29%
Hulu Terengganu
7th	P035	1986–1990	Alias Md. Ali (ألياس مد علي)	BN (UMNO)	14,291; 60.69%
8th	P035	1990–1995	Alias Md. Ali (ألياس مد علي)	BN (UMNO)	15,443; 54.43%
9th	P038	1995–1999	Mustafa Muda (مصطفى مودا)	BN (UMNO)	16,434; 54.58%
10th	P038	1999–2004	Muhyiddin Abdul Rashid (محي الدين عبدالرشيد)	BA (PAS)	17,790; 56.53%
11th	P038	2004–2008	Tengku Putera Tengku Awang (تڠكو ڤوترا تڠكو أواڠ)	BN (UMNO)	23,815; 59.73%
12th	P038	2008–2013	Mohd Nor Othman (محمّد نور عثمان)	BN (UMNO)	27,784; 61.59%
13th	P038	2013–2018	Jailani Johari (جيلاني جوهري)	BN (UMNO)	31,940; 57.38%
14th	P038	2018	Rosol Wahid (رسول واحد)	BN (UMNO)	30,925; 49.60%
14th	P038	2018–2019	Rosol Wahid (رسول واحد)	Independent	30,925; 49.60%
14th	P038	2019–2020	Rosol Wahid (رسول واحد)	PH (BERSATU)	30,925; 49.60%
14th	P038	2020–2022	Rosol Wahid (رسول واحد)	PN (BERSATU)	30,925; 49.60%
15th	P038	2022–present	Rosol Wahid (رسول واحد)	PN (BERSATU)	42,910; 59.59%

=== State constituency ===
Parliamentary constituency	State constituency						
Parliamentary constituency	1954–1959*	1959–1974	1974–1986	1986–1995	1995–2004	2004–2018	2018–present
Hulu Terengganu					Ajil		
Hulu Terengganu				Kuala Berang			
Hulu Terengganu				Manir			
Hulu Terengganu				Tanggul			
Hulu Terengganu				Telemung			
Ulu Trengganu			Binjai				
Ulu Trengganu			Kuala Brang				
Ulu Trengganu			Tanggol				
Ulu Trengganu			Telemung				

=== Historical boundaries ===
State Constituency	State constituency				
State Constituency	1974	1984	1994	2003	2018
Ajil			Ajil; Bukit Apit; Bukit Perah; FELDA Jerangau; FELDA Tersat		
Binjai	Binjai; Kampung Batu 9; Kampung Bukit Sawa; Kampung Lubuk Batu; Wakaf Tapai				
Kuala Berang	FELDA Mengkawang; Kampung Batu 23; Kampung Nasi Digin; Kampung Sungai Ular; Kuala Berang		Kampung Nasi Dingin; Kampung Pantai Ali; Kampung Sungai Ular; Kampung Tajin; Kuala Berang	Bukit Tok Bat; Kuala Berang; Langgar; Pasir Tinggi; Telaga	
Manir		Kampung Banggol; Kampung Peradong; Manir; Pulau Manis; Teluk Menara			
Tanggul	Ajil; Kampung Bukit Diman; Kampung Chepoh; Kampung Pelam; Tanggol	Ajil; Kampung Bukit Diman; Kampung Chepoh; Kampung Tok Randok; Tanggol			
Telemung	Bukit Gemuruh; Kenyir; Kuala Jeneris; Kuala Ping; Kuala Telemung				

=== Current state assembly members ===
No.	State Constituency	Member	Coalition (Party)
N21	Telemung	Mohd Zawawi Ismail	PN (BERSATU)
N22	Manir	Hilmi Harun	PN (PAS)
N23	Kuala Berang	Mamad Puteh	PN (PAS)
N24	Ajil	Maliaman Kassim	PN (PAS)

=== Local governments & postcodes ===
No.	State Constituency	Local Government	Postcode
N21	Telemung	Hulu Terengganu District Council	21200, 21210 Kuala Terengganu; 21700 Kuala Berang; 21800, 21810, 21820 Ajil
N22	Manir	Kuala Terengganu City Council	21200, 21210 Kuala Terengganu; 21700 Kuala Berang; 21800, 21810, 21820 Ajil
N23	Kuala Berang	Hulu Terengganu District Council	21200, 21210 Kuala Terengganu; 21700 Kuala Berang; 21800, 21810, 21820 Ajil
N24	Ajil	Hulu Terengganu District Council	21200, 21210 Kuala Terengganu; 21700 Kuala Berang; 21800, 21810, 21820 Ajil

== Election results ==
Malaysian general election, 2022
Party	Candidate	Votes	%	∆%
PAS	Rosol Wahid	42,910	59.59	▲14.59
BN	Rozi Mamat	27,176	37.74	▼11.86
PH	Alias Ismail	1,740	2.42	▲2.42
PEJUANG	Mohd Khadri Abdullah	182	0.25	▲0.25
Total valid votes		72,008	100.00	
Total rejected ballots		793		
Unreturned ballots		169		
Turnout		72,970	81.90	▼4.41
Registered electors		87,917		
Majority		15,734	21.85	▲17.25
PAS gain from BN		Swing		?
Source(s) https://lom.agc.gov.my/ilims/upload/portal/akta/outputp/1753269/PUB608%20PARLIMEN%20TERENGGANU.pdf

Malaysian general election, 2018
Party	Candidate	Votes	%	∆%
BN	Rosol Wahid	30,925	49.60	▼7.78
PAS	Muhyidin Abdul Rashid	28,057	45.00	▼2.28
PKR	Razali Idris	3,364	5.40	▲5.40
Total valid votes		62,346	100.00	
Total rejected ballots		871		
Unreturned ballots		211		
Turnout		63,428	86.31	▼2.82
Registered electors		73,487		
Majority		2,868	4.60	▼10.16
BN hold		Swing		
Source(s) "His Majesty's Government Gazette - Notice of Contested Election, Parliament for the State of Terengganu [P.U. (B) 235/2018]" (PDF). Attorney General's Chambers of Malaysia. 3 May 2018. "Federal Government Gazette - Results of Contested Election and Statements of the Poll after the Official Addition of Votes, Parliamentary Constituencies for the State of Terengganu [P.U. (B) 309/2018]" (PDF). Attorney General's Chambers of Malaysia. 28 May 2018.

Malaysian general election, 2013
Party	Candidate	Votes	%	∆%
BN	Jailani Johari	31,940	57.38	▼4.21
PAS	Kamaruzaman Abdullah	23,727	42.62	▲4.21
Total valid votes		55,667	100.00	
Total rejected ballots		823		
Unreturned ballots		144		
Turnout		56,634	89.13	▲1.59
Registered electors		63,543		
Majority		8,213	14.76	▼8.42
BN hold		Swing		
Source(s) "Federal Government Gazette - Notice of Contested Election, Parliament for the State of Terengganu [P.U. (B) 172/2013]" (PDF). Attorney General's Chambers of Malaysia. 26 April 2013. "Federal Government Gazette - Results of Contested Election and Statements of the Poll after the Official Addition of Votes, Parliamentary Constituencies for the State of Terengganu [P.U. (B) 213/2013]" (PDF). Attorney General's Chambers of Malaysia. 22 May 2013.

Malaysian general election, 2008
Party	Candidate	Votes	%	∆%
BN	Mohd Nor Othman	27,784	61.59	▲1.86
PAS	Kamaruzaman Abdullah	17,324	38.41	▼1.86
Total valid votes		45,108	100.00	
Total rejected ballots		709		
Unreturned ballots		154		
Turnout		45,971	87.54	▼2.08
Registered electors		52,515		
Majority		10,460	23.18	▲3.72
BN hold		Swing		

Malaysian general election, 2004
Party	Candidate	Votes	%	∆%
BN	Tengku Putera Tengku Awang	23,815	59.73	▲16.26
PAS	Muhyiddin Abdul Rashid	16,055	40.27	▼16.26
Total valid votes		39,870	100.00	
Total rejected ballots		633		
Unreturned ballots		56		
Turnout		40,559	89.62	▲7.27
Registered electors		45,256		
Majority		7,760	19.46	▲6.40
BN gain from PAS		Swing		?

Malaysian general election, 1999
Party	Candidate	Votes	%	∆%
PAS	Muhyiddin Abdul Rashid	17,790	56.53	▲11.11
BN	Othman Daud	13,679	43.47	▼11.11
Total valid votes		31,469	100.00	
Total rejected ballots		755		
Unreturned ballots		50		
Turnout		32,274	82.35	▼2.15
Registered electors		39,191		
Majority		4,111	13.06	▲3.90
PAS gain from BN		Swing		?

Malaysian general election, 1995
Party	Candidate	Votes	%	∆%
BN	Mustafa Muda	16,434	54.58	▲0.15
PAS	Harun Taib	13,675	45.42	▼0.15
Total valid votes		30,109	100.00	
Total rejected ballots		1,177		
Unreturned ballots		47		
Turnout		31,333	84.50	▼2.22
Registered electors		37,080		
Majority		2,759	9.16	▲0.30
BN hold		Swing		

Malaysian general election, 1990
Party	Candidate	Votes	%	∆%
BN	Alias Md. Ali	15,443	54.43	▼6.26
PAS	Harun Taib	12,931	45.57	▲6.26
Total valid votes		28,374	100.00	
Total rejected ballots		712		
Unreturned ballots		0		
Turnout		29,086	86.72	▲2.65
Registered electors		33,541		
Majority		2,512	8.86	▼12.52
BN hold		Swing		

Malaysian general election, 1986
Party	Candidate	Votes	%	∆%
BN	Alias Md. Ali	14,291	60.69	▲5.40
PAS	Kasim Ahmad	9,255	39.31	▼5.40
Total valid votes		23,546	100.00	
Total rejected ballots		784		
Unreturned ballots		0		
Turnout		24,330	84.07	▲0.17
Registered electors		28,941		
Majority		5,036	21.38	▲10.80
BN hold		Swing		

Malaysian general election, 1982: Ulu Trengganu
Party	Candidate	Votes	%	∆%
BN	Alias Md. Ali	12,771	55.29	▼5.84
PAS	Ahmad Awang	10,329	44.71	▲5.84
Total valid votes		23,100	100.00	
Total rejected ballots		1,218		
Unreturned ballots		0		
Turnout		24,318	83.90	▲3.07
Registered electors		28,983		
Majority		2,442	10.58	▼11.68
BN hold		Swing		

Malaysian general election, 1978: Ulu Trengganu
Party	Candidate	Votes	%	∆%
BN	Alias Md. Ali	12,001	61.13	▼3.22
PAS	Mohamed Ghazali Ahmad	7,631	38.87	▲38.87
Total valid votes		19,632	100.00	
Total rejected ballots		1,151		
Unreturned ballots		0		
Turnout		20,783	80.83	▼1.84
Registered electors		25,711		
Majority		4,370	22.26	▼14.70
BN hold		Swing		

Malaysian general election, 1974: Ulu Trengganu
Party	Candidate	Votes	%
BN	Engku Muhsein Abdul Kadir	11,070	64.35
Parti Rakyat Malaysia	Satar Dahan	4,713	27.39
Independent	Hassan Hussin	1,421	8.26
Total valid votes		17,204	100.00
Total rejected ballots		940	
Unreturned ballots		0	
Turnout		18,144	82.67
Registered electors		21,949	
Majority		6,357	36.96
This was a new constituency created.
