= Mohd Nor Hamzah =

Malaysian politician

Yang Berhormat Dato' Mohd Nor Hamzah DPMT SMT MLA
- محمد نور حمزه

16th Speaker of the Terengganu State Legislative Assembly
- Incumbent
- Assumed office 24 September 2023
- Monarch: Mizan Zainal Abidin
- Menteri Besar: Ahmad Samsuri Mokhtar
- Deputy: Khazan Che Mat
- Preceded by: Yahaya Ali
- Constituency: Bukit Payung

Exco roles (Terengganu)
- 2018–2023: Chairman of the Human Development, Da'wah and Information

Faction represented in Terengganu State Legislative Assembly
- 2008–2020: Malaysian Islamic Party
- 2020–: Perikatan Nasional

Personal details
- Born: 18 February 1972 (age 54) Terengganu, Malaysia
- Citizenship: Malaysian
- Party: Malaysian Islamic Party (PAS)
- Other political affiliations: Perikatan Nasional (PN); Muafakat Nasional (MN); Gagasan Sejahtera (GS)
- Occupation: Politician

Mohd Nor bin Hamzah (born 18 February 1972) is a Malaysian politician who has served as Speaker of the Terengganu State Legislative Assembly since September 2023 and Member of the Terengganu State Legislative Assembly (MLA) for Bukit Payung since March 2008. He served as Member of the Terengganu State Executive Council (EXCO) in the Perikatan Nasional (PN) state administration under Menteri Besar Ahmad Samsuri Mokhtar from May 2018 to August 2023. He is a member of the Malaysian Islamic Party (PAS), a component party of the PN coalition.

== Election results ==
Terengganu State Legislative Assembly
Year	Constituency	Candidate	Votes	Pct	Opponent(s)	Votes	Pct	Ballots cast	Majority	Turnout
2008	N18 Bukit Payung	Mohd Nor Hamzah (PAS)	7,324	50.40%	Zaidi Muda (UMNO)	7,209	49.60%	14,664	115	87.64%
2013	N18 Bukit Payung	Mohd Nor Hamzah (PAS)	9,342	51.70%	Zaidi Muda (UMNO)	8,729	48.30%	18,216	613	91.00%
2018	N18 Bukit Payung	Mohd Nor Hamzah (PAS)	11,672	58.77%	Zaitun Mat Amin (UMNO)	7,184	36.17%	20,204	4,488	89.20%
2018	N18 Bukit Payung	Mohd Nor Hamzah (PAS)	11,672	58.77%	Mohd Dalizan Abd Aziz (AMANAH)	1,004	5.06%	20,204	4,488	89.20%
2023	N18 Bukit Payung	Mohd Nor Hamzah (PAS)	16,838	74.11%	Mohd Khim (UMNO)	5,882	25.89%	22,849	10,956	79.27%

== Honours ==
- Terengganu
  - Knight Commander of the Order of the Crown of Terengganu (DPMT) – Dato' (2023)
  - Companion of the Order of the Crown of Terengganu (SMT) (2019)
