= Telemung =

Political subdivision in Malaysia

Telemung (N21)
Terengganu constituency

State constituency
- Legislature: Terengganu State Legislative Assembly
MLA
Mohd Zawawi Ismail
PN
- Constituency created: 1974
- First contested: 1974
- Last contested: 2023

Demographics
- Electors (2023): 21,495

N21 Telemung within Terengganu, as used for the 2023 state election

Telemung is a state constituency in Terengganu, Malaysia, that has been represented in the Terengganu State Legislative Assembly.

The state constituency was first contested in 1974 and is mandated to return a single Assemblyman to the Terengganu State Legislative Assembly under the first-past-the-post voting system.

== Demographics ==
Ethnic breakdown of Telemung's electorate as of 2018
1. Malay (98.9%)
2. Other ethnicities (1.02%)
3. Chinese (0.09%)
4. Indian (0.01%)

== History ==
=== Polling districts ===
According to the Gazette issued on 30 March 2018, the Telemung constituency has a total of 16 polling districts.

State Constituency	Polling Districts	Code	Location
Telemung (N21)	Basung	038/21/01	SK Padang Setebu
Telemung (N21)	Teris	038/21/02	SK Teris
Telemung (N21)	Kuala Ping	038/21/03	SK Kuala Ping
Telemung (N21)	Payang Kayu	038/21/04	SK Sungai Buloh
Telemung (N21)	Tengkawang	038/21/05	SK Tengkawang
Telemung (N21)	Kuala Telemung	038/21/06	SK Kuala Telemong
Telemung (N21)	Nibung	038/21/07	SK Nibong
Telemung (N21)	Matang	038/21/08	SK Matang
Telemung (N21)	Pauh	038/21/09	SK Pauh
Telemung (N21)	Kuala Dura	038/21/10	SK Kuala Dura
Telemung (N21)	Dusun	038/21/11	SK Dusun
Telemung (N21)	Bukit Gemuruh	038/21/12	SK Bukit Gemuroh
Telemung (N21)	Sekayu	038/21/13	SK Padang Setar
Telemung (N21)	Tapah	038/21/14	SK Tapah
Telemung (N21)	Ceting	038/21/15	SK Cheting
Telemung (N21)	Kuala Jenderis	038/21/16	SK Kuala Jenderis

=== Representation history ===
Members of the Legislative Assembly for Telemung
Assembly	No	Years	Member	Party
Constituency created from Ulu Trengganu Barat
4th	N09	1974–1978	Ahmad Sidi Ismail	BN (UMNO)
5th	N09	1978–1982	Ahmad Sidi Ismail	BN (UMNO)
6th	N09	1982–1986	Ahmad Sidi Ismail	BN (UMNO)
7th	N21	1986–1990	Ahmad Sidi Ismail	BN (UMNO)
8th	N21	1990–1995	Ahmad Sidi Ismail	BN (UMNO)
9th	N21	1995–1999	Tengku Putera Tengku Awang	BN (UMNO)
10th	N21	1999–2004	Tengku Putera Tengku Awang	BN (UMNO)
11th	N21	2004–2008	Rozi Mamat	BN (UMNO)
12th	N21	2008–2013	Rozi Mamat	BN (UMNO)
13th	N21	2013–2018	Rozi Mamat	BN (UMNO)
14th	N21	2018–2023	Rozi Mamat	BN (UMNO)
15th	N21	2023–present	Mohd Zawawi Ismail	PN (BERSATU)

== Election results ==
Terengganu state election, 2023: Telemung
Party	Candidate	Votes	%	∆%
PAS	Mohd Zawawi Ismail	8,380	50.90	▲50.90
BN	Rozi Mamat	8,085	49.10	▼13.15
Total valid votes		16,465	100.00	
Total rejected ballots		133		
Unreturned ballots		14		
Turnout		16,612	77.28	▼8.83
Registered electors		21,495		
Majority		295	1.79	▼25.73
PAS gain from BN		Swing		?

Terengganu state election, 2018: Telemung
Party	Candidate	Votes	%	∆%
BN	Rozi Mamat	9,407	62.26	▼12.87
PAS	Kamaruzaman Abdullah	5,248	34.73	▲34.73
PKR	Sharifah Norhayati Syed Omar	455	3.01	▼21.86
Total valid votes		15,110	100.00	
Total rejected ballots		244		
Unreturned ballots		33		
Turnout		15,387	86.11	▼2.79
Registered electors		17,868		
Majority		4,159	27.52	▼22.72
BN hold		Swing		

Terengganu state election, 2013: Telemung
Party	Candidate	Votes	%	∆%
BN	Rozi Mamat	10,262	75.12	▼0.85
PKR	Narawi Embong	3,398	24.88	▲0.85
Total valid votes		13,660	100.00	
Total rejected ballots		304		
Unreturned ballots		31		
Turnout		13,995	88.90	▲1.04
Registered electors		15,742		
Majority		6,864	50.25	▼1.69
BN hold		Swing		

Terengganu state election, 2008: Telemung
Party	Candidate	Votes	%	∆%
BN	Rozi Mamat	8,619	75.97	▲5.41
PKR	Engku Abu Bakar Engku Mohd	2,726	24.03	▲24.03
Total valid votes		11,345	100.00	
Total rejected ballots		212		
Unreturned ballots		107		
Turnout		11,664	87.86	▼2.46
Registered electors		13,275		
Majority		5,893	51.94	▲10.83
BN hold		Swing		

Terengganu state election, 2004: Telemung
Party	Candidate	Votes	%	∆%
BN	Rozi Mamat	7,276	70.56	▲15.96
PAS	Kamaruzaman Abdullah	3,036	29.44	▼15.96
Total valid votes		10,312	100.00	
Total rejected ballots		135		
Unreturned ballots		2		
Turnout		10,449	90.33	▲3.06
Registered electors		11,568		
Majority		4,240	41.12	▲31.93
BN hold		Swing		

Terengganu state election, 1999: Telemung
Party	Candidate	Votes	%	∆%
BN	Tengku Putera Tengku Awang	3,921	54.59	▼11.11
PAS	Jusoh Othman	3,261	45.41	▲45.41
Total valid votes		7,182	100.00	
Total rejected ballots		243		
Unreturned ballots		0		
Turnout		7,425	87.27	▲1.24
Registered electors		8,508		
Majority		660	9.19	▼24.44
BN hold		Swing		

Terengganu state election, 1995: Telemung
Party	Candidate	Votes	%	∆%
BN	T. Putera T. Sulaiman	4,369	65.71	▲0.97
S46	Aziz Ahmad	2,133	32.08	▼3.18
Independent	Abdul Majid Sulaiman	147	2.21	▲2.21
Total valid votes		6,649	100.00	
Total rejected ballots		203		
Unreturned ballots		6		
Turnout		6,858	86.03	▼2.37
Registered electors		7,972		
Majority		2,236	33.63	▲4.14
BN hold		Swing		

Terengganu state election, 1990: Telemung
Party	Candidate	Votes	%	∆%
BN	Ahmad Sidi Ismail	4,198	64.74	▼0.80
S46	Aziz Ahmad	2,286	35.26	▲35.26
Total valid votes		6,484	100.00	
Total rejected ballots		280		
Unreturned ballots		0		
Turnout		6,764	88.40	▲1.60
Registered electors		7,652		
Majority		1,912	29.49	▼1.61
BN hold		Swing		

Terengganu state election, 1986: Telemung
Party	Candidate	Votes	%	∆%
BN	Ahmad Sidi Ismail	3,672	65.55	▲1.25
PAS	Jusoh Othman	1,930	34.45	▼1.25
Total valid votes		5,602	100.00	
Total rejected ballots		293		
Unreturned ballots		0		
Turnout		5,895	86.79	▼0.55
Registered electors		6,792		
Majority		1,742	31.10	▲2.51
BN hold		Swing		

Terengganu state election, 1982: Telemong
Party	Candidate	Votes	%	∆%
BN	Ahmad Sidi Ismail	3,353	64.30	▲1.63
PAS	Mat Ali Idris	1,862	35.70	▼1.63
Total valid votes		5,215	100.00	
Total rejected ballots		183		
Unreturned ballots		0		
Turnout		5,398	87.35	▲3.07
Registered electors		6,180		
Majority		1,491	28.59	▲3.26
BN hold		Swing		

Terengganu state election, 1978: Telemong
Party	Candidate	Votes	%	∆%
BN	Ahmad Sidi Ismail	2,758	62.67	▲3.30
PAS	Abu Bakar Ismail	1,643	37.33	▲37.33
Total valid votes		4,401	100.00	
Total rejected ballots		304		
Unreturned ballots		0		
Turnout		4,705	84.27	▼1.92
Registered electors		5,583		
Majority		1,115	25.34	▼7.37
BN hold		Swing		

Terengganu state election, 1974: Telemong
Party	Candidate	Votes	%
BN	Ahmad Sidi Ismail	2,314	59.36
Parti Sosialis Rakyat Malaysia	Salleh Mohamad	1,039	26.65
Independent	Mat Ali Idris	330	8.47
Independent	Mamat Ibrahim	215	5.52
Total valid votes		3,898	100.00
Total rejected ballots		309	
Unreturned ballots		0	
Turnout		4,207	86.19
Registered electors		4,881	
Majority		1,275	32.71
This was a new constituency created.
