= Bukit Payung =

Political subdivision in Malaysia

Bukit Payung (N18)
Terengganu constituency

State constituency
- Legislature: Terengganu State Legislative Assembly
MLA
Mohd Nor Hamzah
PN
- Constituency created: 1973
- First contested: 1974
- Last contested: 2023

Demographics
- Electors (2023): 28,823

N18 Bukit Payung within Terengganu, as used for the 2023 state election

Bukit Payung is a state constituency in Terengganu, Malaysia, that has been represented in the Terengganu State Legislative Assembly.

The state constituency was first contested in 1974 and is mandated to return a single Assemblyman to the Terengganu State Legislative Assembly under the first-past-the-post voting system.

== Demographics ==
Ethnic breakdown of Bukit Payung's electorate as of 2018
1. Malay (99.4%)
2. Chinese (0.26%)
3. Other ethnicities (0.24%)
4. Indian (0.07%)

== History ==
=== Polling districts ===
According to the Gazette issued on 30 March 2018, the Bukit Payung constituency has a total of 10 polling districts.

State Constituency	Polling Districts	Code	Location
Bukit Payung (N18)	Kampung Laut	037/18/01	SK Kampong Bukit Chenderiang
Bukit Payung (N18)	Atas Tol	037/18/02	SK Atas Tol
Bukit Payung (N18)	Paya Resak	037/18/03	SK Paya Resak
Bukit Payung (N18)	Kedai Buluh	037/18/04	SK Kedai Buluh
Bukit Payung (N18)	Surau Haji Daud	037/18/05	SK Tok Dir
Bukit Payung (N18)	Undang	037/18/06	SK Undang
Bukit Payung (N18)	Bukit Payung	037/18/07	SK Bukit Payong
Bukit Payung (N18)	Pekan Bukit Payung	037/18/08	Tadika Yayasan Islam Terengganu Cawangan Bukit Payung
Bukit Payung (N18)	Mak Kemas	037/18/09	SMK Seri Payong
Bukit Payung (N18)	Surau Panjang	037/18/10	SMK Sultan Mansor

=== Representation history ===
Members of the Legislative Assembly for Bukit Payung
Assembly	No	Years	Member	Party
Constituency created from Binjai and Kuala Trengganu Tengah
Bukit Payong
4th	N16	1974–1978	Mukhtar Mohamed	BN (PAS)
5th	N16	1978–1982	Abdul Razak Taib	BN (UMNO)
6th	N16	1982–1986	Abdul Razak Taib	BN (UMNO)
Bukit Payung
7th	N18	1986–1990	Mazlan Awang	BN (UMNO)
8th	N18	1990–1992	Baharudin Mohd	PAS
8th	N18	1992–1995	Mazlan Awang	BN (UMNO)
9th	N18	1995–1999	Abdul Latiff Awang	BN (UMNO)
10th	N18	1999–2004	Hassan Mohd Salleh	PAS
11th	N18	2004–2008	Abdul Latiff Awang	BN (UMNO)
12th	N18	2008–2013	Mohd Nor Hamzah	PR (PAS)
13th	N18	2013–2018	Mohd Nor Hamzah	PR (PAS)
14th	N18	2018–2020	Mohd Nor Hamzah	PAS
14th	N18	2020–2023	Mohd Nor Hamzah	PN (PAS)
15th	N18	2023–present	Mohd Nor Hamzah	PN (PAS)

== Election results ==
Terengganu state election, 2023: Bukit Payung
Party	Candidate	Votes	%	∆%
PAS	Mohd Nor Hamzah	16,838	74.11	▲15.34
BN	Mohd Khim @ Mohd Khan Abdul Rahman	5,882	25.89	▼10.28
Total valid votes		22,720	100.00	
Total rejected ballots		129		
Unreturned ballots		19		
Turnout		22,868	79.34	▼9.82
Registered electors		28,823		
Majority		10,956	48.22	▲25.62
PAS hold		Swing		

Terengganu state election, 2018: Bukit Payung
Party	Candidate	Votes	%	∆%
PAS	Mohd Nor Hamzah	11,672	58.77	▲7.08
BN	Zaitun binti Mat Amin	7,184	36.17	▼12.13
PKR	Mohd Dalizan Abd Aziz	1,004	5.06	▲5.06
Total valid votes		19,860	100.00	
Total rejected ballots		198		
Unreturned ballots		146		
Turnout		20,204	89.16	▼1.73
Registered electors		22,661		
Majority		4,488	22.60	▲19.21
PAS hold		Swing		

Terengganu state election, 2013: Bukit Payung
Party	Candidate	Votes	%	∆%
PAS	Mohd Nor Hamzah	9,342	51.70	▲1.30
BN	Zaidi Muda	8,729	48.30	▼1.30
Total valid votes		18,071	100.00	
Total rejected ballots		145		
Unreturned ballots		19		
Turnout		18,235	90.89	▲3.25
Registered electors		20,063		
Majority		613	3.39	▲2.60
PAS hold		Swing		

Terengganu state election, 2008: Bukit Payung
Party	Candidate	Votes	%	∆%
PAS	Mohd Nor Hamzah	7,324	50.40	▲3.20
BN	Zaidi Muda	7,209	49.60	▼3.20
Total valid votes		14,533	100.00	
Total rejected ballots		130		
Unreturned ballots		1		
Turnout		14,664	87.64	▼1.95
Registered electors		16,733		
Majority		115	0.79	▼4.82
PAS gain from BN		Swing		-

Terengganu state election, 2004: Bukit Payung
Party	Candidate	Votes	%	∆%
BN	Abdul Latiff Awang	6,773	52.81	▲13.50
PAS	Hassan Mohd Salleh	6,053	47.19	▼13.50
Total valid votes		12,826	100.00	
Total rejected ballots		152		
Unreturned ballots		7		
Turnout		12,985	89.58	▲4.29
Registered electors		14,495		
Majority		720	5.61	▼15.77
BN gain from PAS		Swing		-

Terengganu state election, 1999: Bukit Payung
Party	Candidate	Votes	%	∆%
PAS	Hassan Mohd Salleh	6,686	60.69	▲11.54
BN	Abdul Latiff Awang	4,330	39.31	▼11.54
Total valid votes		11,016	100.00	
Total rejected ballots		221		
Unreturned ballots		12		
Turnout		11,249	85.30	▲1.24
Registered electors		13,188		
Majority		2,356	21.39	▲19.68
PAS gain from BN		Swing		-

Terengganu state election, 1995: Bukit Payung
Party	Candidate	Votes	%	∆%
BN	Abdul Latiff Awang	4,928	50.85	▼1.46
PAS	Baharudin @ Ismail Mohd	4,763	49.15	▲1.46
Total valid votes		9,691	100.00	
Total rejected ballots		186		
Unreturned ballots		27		
Turnout		9,904	84.06	▼0.65
Registered electors		11,782		
Majority		165	1.70	▼2.92
BN hold		Swing		

Terengganu state election, 1992: Bukit Payung
Party	Candidate	Votes	%	∆%
BN	Mazlan Awang	4,401	52.31	▲2.41
PAS	Baharudin @ Ismail Mohd	4,012	47.69	▼2.41
Total valid votes		8,413	100.00	
Total rejected ballots		104		
Unreturned ballots		4		
Turnout		8,521	84.71	▼0.11
Registered electors		10,059		
Majority		389	4.62	▲4.42
BN gain from APU		Swing		-

Terengganu state election, 1990: Bukit Payung
Party	Candidate	Votes	%	∆%
PAS	Baharudin @ Ismail Mohd	4,163	50.10	▲1.24
BN	Mazlan Awang	4,146	49.90	▼1.24
Total valid votes		8,309	100.00	
Total rejected ballots		212		
Unreturned ballots		11		
Turnout		8,532	84.82	▲2.44
Registered electors		10,059		
Majority		17	0.20	▼2.07
PAS gain from BN		Swing		-

Terengganu state election, 1986: Bukit Payung
Party	Candidate	Votes	%	∆%
BN	Mazlan Awang	3,288	51.14	▼1.52
PAS	Baharudin @ Ismail Mohd	3,142	48.86	▲1.52
Total valid votes		6,430	100.00	
Total rejected ballots		269		
Unreturned ballots		0		
Turnout		6,699	82.38	▲0.50
Registered electors		8,132		
Majority		146	2.27	▼3.04
BN hold		Swing		

Terengganu state election, 1982: Bukit Payong
Party	Candidate	Votes	%	∆%
BN	Abdul Razik Taib	3,569	52.66	▼4.94
PAS	Hussin Ismail	3,209	47.34	▲13.09
Total valid votes		6,778	100.00	
Total rejected ballots		182		
Unreturned ballots		0		
Turnout		6,960	81.88	▲3.38
Registered electors		8,500		
Majority		360	5.31	▼18.03
BN hold		Swing		

Terengganu state election, 1978: Bukit Payong
Party	Candidate	Votes	%	∆%
BN	Abdul Razik Taib	3,336	57.60	▲57.60
PAS	Mukhtar Mohd.	1,984	34.25	▼27.96
Parti Sosialis Rakyat Malaysia	Abidin Hassan	472	8.15	▼6.51
Total valid votes		5,792	100.00	
Total rejected ballots		120		
Unreturned ballots		0		
Turnout		5,912	78.50	▲0.39
Registered electors		7,531		
Majority		1,352	23.34	▼15.74
BN hold		Swing		

Terengganu state election, 1974: Bukit Payong
Party	Candidate	Votes	%
BN	Mukhtar Mohd.	3,039	62.21
Independent	Ngah Jusoh	1,130	23.13
Parti Sosialis Rakyat Malaysia	Mamat @ Badero Yusoh	716	14.66
Total valid votes		4,885	100.00
Total rejected ballots		369	
Unreturned ballots		0	
Turnout		5,254	78.11
Registered electors		6,726	
Majority		1,909	39.08
This was a new constituency created.
