= Engku Muhsein Abdul Kadir =

Malaysian politician

Dato' Engku Muhsein bin Abdul Kadir was a Malaysian politician and member of the United Malays National Organisation (UMNO). He held several key political positions during his career, including representing the Trengganu Tengah (and later Ulu Terengganu when it was renamed) constituency in the Parliament of Malaysia.

== Political career ==
Engku Muhsein began his political career by representing Trengganu Tengah in the Federal Legislative Council from 1955 to 1959. Additionally, he served as the Speaker of the Terengganu State Legislative Assembly from 1 June 1958 to 30 April 1959. He continued to serve in the Parliament of Malaysia for the same constituency from 1964 to 1969 and again from 1971 to 1973. During his tenure, he was a member of the Alliance Party representing UMNO. After the constituency was renamed to Ulu Terengganu, he represented Barisan Nasional for another term from 1974 to 1978.

Engku Muhsein served prominently as the Assistant Minister of Youth, Culture, and Sports from 1964 to 1970, actively participating in parliamentary debates and advocating policies supporting educational and cultural development initiatives, particularly in Terengganu.

== Contributions and legacy ==
Engku Muhsein's contributions to Malaysian politics significantly promoted youth and cultural development during his tenure as Assistant Minister. Notably, he officiated the inaugural National Review and Display for the Boys' Brigade in Malaysia in 1966, an event that evolved into the organization's biennial "Pesta" festival.

== Election results ==
Federal Legislative Council
Year	Constituency	Candidate	Votes	Pct	Opponent(s)	Votes	Pct	Ballots cast	Majority	Turnout
1955	Trengganu Tengah	Engku Muhsein Abdul Kadir (UMNO)	19,038	80.05%	Suleiman Ali (Negara)	4,746	19.95%	23,784	14,292	70.48%

Parliament of Federation of Malaya
Year	Constituency	Candidate	Votes	Pct	Opponent(s)	Votes	Pct	Ballots cast	Majority	Turnout
1959	P027 Kuala Trengganu Selatan	Engku Muhsein Abdul Kadir (UMNO)	5,374	40.22%	Onn Jaafar (Negara)	7,986	59.78%	13,360	2,612	70,09%

Parliament of Malaysia
Year	Constituency	Candidate	Votes	Pct	Opponent(s)	Votes	Pct	Ballots cast	Majority	Turnout
1964	P030 Trengganu Tengah	Engku Muhsein Abdul Kadir (UMNO)	11,002	55.18%	Che Su Mahmood Amar (PMIP)	7,393	37.08%	20,821	3,609	80.76%
1964	P030 Trengganu Tengah	Engku Muhsein Abdul Kadir (UMNO)	11,002	55.18%	Abdul Latif Fakeh (PRM)	1,156	5.80%	20,821	3,609	80.76%
1964	P030 Trengganu Tengah	Engku Muhsein Abdul Kadir (UMNO)	11,002	55.18%	Abu Bakar Arshadi (Negara)	388	1.95%	20,821	3,609	80.76%
1969	P030 Trengganu Tengah	Engku Muhsein Abdul Kadir (UMNO)	12,157	51.06%	Abdul Rashid Su (PMIP)	11,651	48.94%	25,207	506	80.49%
1974	P030 Ulu Trengganu	Engku Muhsein Abdul Kadir (UMNO)	11,070	64.35%	Satar Dahan (PRM)	4,713	27.39%	18,144	6,357	82.67%
1974	P030 Ulu Trengganu	Engku Muhsein Abdul Kadir (UMNO)	11,070	64.35%	Hassan Hussin (IND)	1,421	8.26%	18,144	6,357	82.67%
