= Trengganu Tengah =

Terengganu constituency

Defunct federal constituency
- Legislature: Dewan Rakyat
- Constituency created: 1955
- Constituency abolished: 1974
- First contested: 1955
- Last contested: 1969

Trengganu Tengah was a federal constituency in Terengganu, Malaysia, that was represented in the Dewan Rakyat from 1955 to 1974.

The federal constituency was created in the 1955 redistribution and was mandated to return a single member to the Dewan Rakyat under the first past the post voting system.

== History ==
It was abolished in 1974 when it was redistributed.

=== Representation history ===
Members of Parliament for Trengganu Tengah
| Parliament | No | Years | Member | Party | Vote Share |
Constituency created
Federal Legislative Council
| 1st | | 1955–1959 | Engku Muhsein Abdul Kadir (اڠكو موهسإين عبدالقادر) | Alliance (UMNO) | 19,038; 80.05% |
Parliament of the Federation of Malaya
| 1st | P030 | 1959–1963 | Harun Pilus (هارون ڤيلوس) | PMIP | 8,625; 59.34% |
Parliament of Malaysia
| 1st | P030 | 1963–1964 | Harun Pilus (هارون ڤيلوس) | PMIP | 8,625; 59.34% |
| 2nd | P030 | 1964–1969 | Engku Muhsein Abdul Kadir (اڠكو موهسإين عبدالقادر) | Alliance (UMNO) | 11,002; 55.18% |
| | | 1969–1971 | Parliament was suspended | | |
| 3rd | P030 | 1971–1973 | Engku Muhsein Abdul Kadir (اڠكو موهسإين عبدالقادر) | Alliance (UMNO) | 12,157; 51.06% |
| 3rd | P030 | 1973–1974 | Engku Muhsein Abdul Kadir (اڠكو موهسإين عبدالقادر) | BN (UMNO) | 12,157; 51.06% |
Constituency abolished, renamed to Ulu Trengganu

=== State constituency ===
| Parliamentary constituency | State constituency | | | | | | |
| Parliamentary constituency | 1954–59* | 1959–1974 | 1974–1986 | 1986–1995 | 1995–2004 | 2004–2018 | 2018–present |
|---|---|---|---|---|---|---|---|
| Trengganu Tengah | | Binjai | | | | | |
| Trengganu Tengah | Bukit Besar | | | | | | |
| Trengganu Tengah | Kuala Trengganu Barat | | | | | | |
| Trengganu Tengah | Kuala Trengganu Selatan | | | | | | |
| Trengganu Tengah | Kuala Trengganu Tengah | | | | | | |
| Trengganu Tengah | Kuala Trengganu Utara | | | | | | |
| Trengganu Tengah | | Ulu Trengganu Barat | | | | | |
| Trengganu Tengah | | Ulu Trengganu Timor | | | | | |

=== Historical boundaries ===
| State Constituency | Area |
| State Constituency | 1959 |
|---|---|
| Binjai | Binjai; Bukit Payong; Kampung Banggol; Kampung Lubuk Batu; Wakaf Tapai |
| Kuala Trengganu Tengah | Kampung Bukit; Kampung Telaga Mengkudu; Kampung Padang Midin; Kampung Undang; Kedai Buluh |
| Ulu Trengganu Barat | Kenyir; Kampung Bukit Aceh; Kampung Pasir Simpul; Kampung Pelam; Kuala Ping |
| Ulu Trengganu Timor | Ajil; Kampung Landas; Kampung Perok; Kampung Tajin; Kuala Berang |

== Election results ==
Malaysian general election, 1969: Trengganu Tengah
| Party | Candidate | Votes | % | ∆% |
|---|---|---|---|---|
| Alliance | Engku Muhsein Abdul Kadir | 12,157 | 51.06 | ▼4.12 |
| PMIP | Abdul Rashid Su | 11,651 | 48.94 | ▲11.86 |
| Total valid votes | | 23,808 | 100.00 | |
| Total rejected ballots | | 1,399 | | |
| Unreturned ballots | | 0 | | |
| Turnout | | 25,207 | 80.49 | ▼0.27 |
| Registered electors | | 31,316 | | |
| Majority | | 506 | 2.12 | ▼15.98 |
| Alliance hold | | Swing | | |

Malaysian general election, 1964: Trengganu Tengah
| Party | Candidate | Votes | % | ∆% |
|---|---|---|---|---|
| Alliance | Engku Muhsein Abdul Kadir | 11,002 | 55.18 | ▲21.10 |
| PMIP | Che Su Mahmood Amar | 7,393 | 37.08 | ▼22.26 |
| Socialist Front | Abdul Latif Fakeh | 1,156 | 5.80 | ▲5.80 |
| National Party | Abu Bakar Arshadi | 388 | 1.95 | ▲1.95 |
| Total valid votes | | 19,939 | 100.00 | |
| Total rejected ballots | | 882 | | |
| Unreturned ballots | | 0 | | |
| Turnout | | 20,821 | 80.76 | ▲9.85 |
| Registered electors | | 25,780 | | |
| Majority | | 3,609 | 18.10 | ▼7.16 |
| Alliance gain from PMIP | | Swing | | ? |

Malayan general election, 1959: Trengganu Tengah
| Party | Candidate | Votes | % | ∆% |
|---|---|---|---|---|
| PMIP | Harun Pilus | 8,625 | 59.34 | ▲59.34 |
| Alliance | Ismail Kassim | 4,954 | 34.08 | ▼45.97 |
| Independent | Setia Abu Bakar | 758 | 5.21 | ▲5.21 |
| Independent | Engku Sayed Mohsin Zabidin | 199 | 1.37 | ▲1.37 |
| Total valid votes | | 14,536 | 100.00 | |
| Total rejected ballots | | 188 | | |
| Unreturned ballots | | 0 | | |
| Turnout | | 14,724 | 70.91 | ▲0.43 |
| Registered electors | | 20,765 | | |
| Majority | | 3,671 | 25.26 | ▼34.84 |
| PMIP gain from Alliance | | Swing | | ? |

Malayan general election, 1955: Trengganu Tengah
| Party | Candidate | Votes | % |
|---|---|---|---|
| Alliance | Engku Muhsin Abdul Kadir | 19,038 | 80.05 |
| National Party | Suleiman Ali | 4,746 | 19.95 |
| Total valid votes | | 23,784 | 100.00 |
| Total rejected ballots | | | |
| Unreturned ballots | | | |
| Turnout | | 23,784 | 70.48 |
| Registered electors | | 33,747 | |
| Majority | | 14,292 | 60.10 |
This was a new constituency created.
Source(s): The Straits Times.
