= Sungai Bari =

Kampung Sungai Bari كامڤوڠ سوڠاي باري
- Nickname: Cabey Lakak
- Motto: Membangun Bersama Industri (Bahasa Melayu), Driving Industrial Progress (English)
- Interactive map of Kampung Sungai Bari
- Coordinates: 5°24′0″N 102°51′0″E
- Country: Malaysia
- States: Terengganu
- District: Setiu
- Sub-district: Hulu Nerus
- Constituency: P.034 Setiu
- State Assembly: N.07 Langkap
- Established: 1920 - 1930
- Postcode: 21500

Government
  - Community leaders / Jawatankuasa Kemajuan dan Keselamatan Kampung (JKKK): Roslee Bin Awang (term in 2015)

Population (2010 estimate)
  - Total: 1,500
- Time zone: UTC+8 (MST)
  - Summer (DST): not observed
- Website: sungaibari.blogspot.com

Kampung Sungai Bari is a main village and settlement in sub-district of Hulu Nerus, located in Setiu District, Terengganu, Malaysia. It is bordered by the Kampung Langkap, Sungai Tong, Sungai Lerek, and Kampong Selamat, can be connected through a network of main roads of Kuala Terengganu to Kelatan capital of Kota Bharu. Its geographical coordinates are 5° 24' 0" North, 102° 51' 0" East and its original name (with diacritics) is Kampong Sungai Bari.

The village is under the administration of JKKK Sungai Bari, democratically elected by vote by the local community each year. There are a variety jurisdiction and duties of the committee, who have full responsibility for the management and communication of information from the government to the people and to allocate funds and assistance delivered by the state or federal government.

Sungai Bari also is a major industrial area in the state of Terengganu. Industrial area located here which put a solar farm for electricity generation which is among the largest in Malaysia.
