= SMK Sura =

National secondary school in Dungun, Terengganu, Malaysia

Sekolah Menengah Kebangsaan Sura SMKS
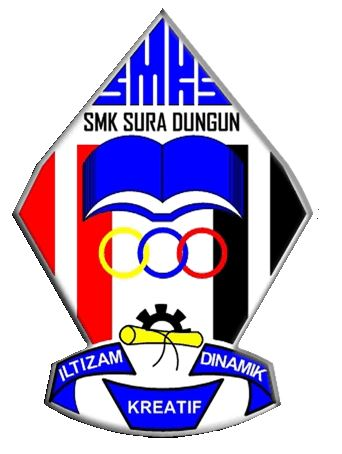

Location
- Kampung Sura Tengah; Kuala Dungun, Terengganu 23000; Malaysia; 4°43′42.7″N 103°25′49.8″E

Information
- Other names: Semesra; Sura
- Type: National Secondary School
- Motto: Semesra Sehasrat Sepakat Sukses (Semesra Synergy Solidarity Success)
- Religious affiliation: Sunni Islam
- Established: 16 June 1995
- Status: Open
- School district: Dungun
- Educational authority: Malaysian Ministry of Education; Terengganu State Education Department; Dungun District Education Office
- School code: TEA 1034
- Principal: Mohd Razali bin Muda
- Grades: Form 1 - Form 5
- Age: 12 years old to 18 years old
- Classes offered: STEM A; STEM C; Humanities, Literature and Economics
- Language: Malay, English, Terengganu Malay, Malaysian Sign Language
- Hours in school day: 7.30am to 1.40pm (lower form) or 2.30pm (upper form), 4.00pm (Tuesday and Wednesday)
- Area: 7.2 hectares
- Slogan: Sekolah dipesisir laut (school on the seashore)
- Song: Lagu SMK Sura
- Rival: SMK Sultan Sulaiman
- Website: smksuradungun.blogspot.com/p/tentang-kami.html

Sekolah Menengah Kebangsaan Sura (Note: UK: /ˌsəˈkɒləməˈnɛŋəkəˌbæŋˈsɑːnˈsʊərrə/ sə‑KOL‑uh-muh‑NEH‑nguh-kuh‑BANG‑sahn-SOO‑rah, US: /ˌsəkəˈkoʊləməˈnɛŋəkəˌbæŋˈsɑːnˈsʊrə/ suh‑KOHL‑uh-muh‑NEH‑nguh-kuh‑BANG‑sahn-SOO‑rah; Malaysian pronunciation: [səkoˈlah mənəˈŋah kəbɑŋsaˈʔan ˈsura]) (Jawi: سكوله منڠه كبڠسأن سور, English: Sura national secondary school, Terengganu Malay: Skölöh Mnengöh Kebangsaang Sure), also known as SMK Sura or SEMESRA, is a national secondary school located in Sura, Dungun, Terengganu, along the coastline of the South China Sea.

The school derives its name from Sura, the state constituency where it is situated, which itself gets its name from a village of the same name. The village is named after an event where the villagers cook Bubur Asyura, a dish that is prepared on the day of Asyura, which commemorates the day of The Exodus, the day Noah disembarked from the ark, the day God forgave Adam, and the day prophet Muhammad was conceived.

== History ==
The school was first developed in 1993 on a 7.2-hectare area and began operations on 16 June 1995. A few weeks later, on 1 July 1995, the school started receiving 325 students from Form 1, Form 2, and Form 4, along with 13 teachers who were previously stationed at SMK Tengku Intan Zaharah.

At the time of its opening, there were seven classes, divided into three for Form 1, three for Form 2, and one for Form 4, with a total of 13 teachers and one administrative assistant.

== School anthem ==
The school anthem of SMK Sura does not have an official name. It is simply called "Lagu Sekolah SMK Sura" (literally: SMK Sura school song). The anthem is sung by students and faculty members during the Sunday morning gathering at the assembly area.

It is performed after the national anthem of Malaysia, Negaraku, and the state anthem of Terengganu, Selamat Sultan, alongside the flag-raising ceremony, which includes the Jalur Gemilang, the state flag, and the school flag. The lyrics were written by Choo Mee Yong, though we do not know who this individual is.

The following is the full version of the school anthem in Malay and direct English translation:

Original (Malay)	Direct translation
Semesra, Sehasrat, Sepakat, Sukses	Semesra, Synergy, Solidarity, Success
Inilah teras moto kami yang setia memimpin,	This is the core of our motto that (will) always lead us,
Kami kental menempuhi ujian cabaran,	We are strong-willed (while) facing trials (and) challenges,
Terus tuju kegemilangan,	Keep going towards (The) glory,
Pastinya milik kami,	It's definitely ours.
SMK Sura,	SMK Sura,
Bermulanya duniaku,	The beginning of my world,
Kami berbangga bersamamu,	We are proud of you,
Janji julang namamu,	(We) promise to make your name known,
Walau kecil di mata,	Even though (you are) small in the eyes (of the world),
Rela berjuang bersama,	(We are) willing to fight together,
Kegemilangan SMK Sura pastinya milik kami.	The glory of SMK Sura is definitely ours.
SMK Sura,	SMK Sura,
Bermulanya duniaku,	The beginning of my world,
Kami berbangga bersamamu,	We are proud of you,
Janji julang namamu,	(We) promise to make your name known,
Walau kecil di mata,	Even though (you are) small in the eyes (of the world),
Rela berjuang bersama,	(We are) willing to fight together,
Kegemilangan SMK Sura pastinya milik kami.	The glory of SMK Sura is definitely ours.
Kegemilangan SMK Sura pastinya milik kami.	The glory of SMK Sura is definitely ours.

== Principal ==
As of 4 December 2025, a total of 11 individuals have served as Principal of SMK Sura. These individuals are as follows:

Principals of SMK Sura
No.	Name	Service Period	Notes
0	Mat Zali bin Ismail	1 July 1995 - 9 December 1995 (5 months)	Not an official principal; managed the school as Senior Assistant for Curriculum Affairs
1	Haji Abdullah bin Ali	10 December 1995 - 1 March 1996 (3 months)	Shortest-serving principal; transferred to SMK Sultan Omar
2	Abdul Malik bin Musadali	1 April 1996 - 31 December 1999 (3 years, 9 months)	Transferred to SMK Pulau Serai
3	Zakariah bin Ali	1 January 2000 - 31 January 2001 (1 year, 1 month)	Transferred to SMK Ketengah Jaya
4	Hajah Midah binti Mamat	1 December 2000 - 2009 (9 years)	Longest-serving principal
5	Hajah Salmah binti Mohd Tahar	2009 - 2012 (3 years)	
6	Hahah Radziah binti Ismail	2012 - 2014 (2 years)	
7	Haji Mohd Sidek bin Embong	2014 - 2016 (2 years)	
8	Che Rashid bin Sulong	2016 - 2022 (6 years)	
9	Haji Husin bin Mohd Nor	2022 - 23 March 2024 (2 years)	He abolished the 'tuck-in' uniform rule.
10	Muhamad Mustafa bin Chik	24 March 2024 - 6 November 2025 (1 year, 7 months, 13 days)	He reintroduced the 'tuck-in' uniform rule and is known for his tendency to use the catchphrase 'YESSS!'
11	Mohd Razali bin Muda	4 December 2025 - now	He is known to be really strict about the problem of absenteeism among students.

== Achievements ==
Achievements of SMK Sura
Year	Name/Team	Competition	Level	Achievement
2019	Siti Nurliana, Wan Najmiatul	MAGGI® National high School Teen Chef Competition	National	Champion
2023	Kharunnirah binti Khairuddin	FINCO Annual Award (2023)	National	FINCO Aspire Outstanding Student of the Year
2024	KMR 2024 Team (Note: Led by Sir Mohd Nurul Fakhri bin Fauzi.) (Note: Presenter - Alya Damia Batrisyia binti Alyatim, Damia Hanun binti Sharuddin, Aira Qaisara Fatima binti Amir Fadhli, Wan Muhammad Haziq bin Wan Zainuddin.) (Note: Technical supervisors - Mohammad Yusof bin Ariffin, Airil Zikri bin Mohd Azwan, Muhammad Akram bin Juslyminramadhan, Muhammad Irfan Firdaus bin Mohd Nor, Muhammad Haziq Adam bin Juzaili.) (Note: Others - Nurrah Humaira binti Mustikem Billah, Nur Alya Izzati binti Muhamed Hazrin, Noor Suwarni Fatihah binti Pairan)	"understanding through design" (KMR) TS25 Showcase, Dungun District Level	District	Gold Place
2025	Under-15 Girls' Cross Country Team	MSSD Dungun Cross Country Championship (2025)	District	Champion
2025	2025 Girls' KRS Marching Team	KRS & TKRS Foot Drill Competition (2025)	District	Champion
2025	KMR 2025 Team	Terengganu KMR Exhibition and STEM Explorace	State	Gold award (product)
2026	Muhammad Danish Hazim	Malaysia Information Technology Challenge (MITC) Competition for Youth With Disabilities (eCombination Challenge (learning disabilities)) 2026	National	Champion

== Litigation case ==
In March 2026, the Kuala Terengganu Sessions Court dismissed a lawsuit filed by a former student against several teachers, the school principal, the Director-General of Education, and the Malaysian government over an incident on 25 October 2020 during a Home Science SPM trial at SMK Sura.

The student was discovered hiding an iPhone in her undergarment during a surprise inspection conducted after suspicions of cheating were raised. She later sued the defendants alleging negligence, improper search procedures, and defamation. The court ruled that the inspection conducted by female teachers was reasonable under the circumstances and that the incident resulted from the plaintiff's own misconduct, and ordered her to pay RM10,000 in costs.

== Criminal case ==
On September 4, 2024, a male Physical and Health Education (PJK) teacher was brought to court on accusation of four charges of Molesting a 14-year-and-9-month-old male student.

== Death cases ==
On December 3, 2015, the school's computer technician, Muhammad Hafiz Che Kamarudin, 31 years old, was found dead in the living room of the teachers' quarters after being missing for two days.
