= Pantai Timur Range =

Mountain range in Peninsular Malaysia

- Banjaran Pantai Timur (Malay)
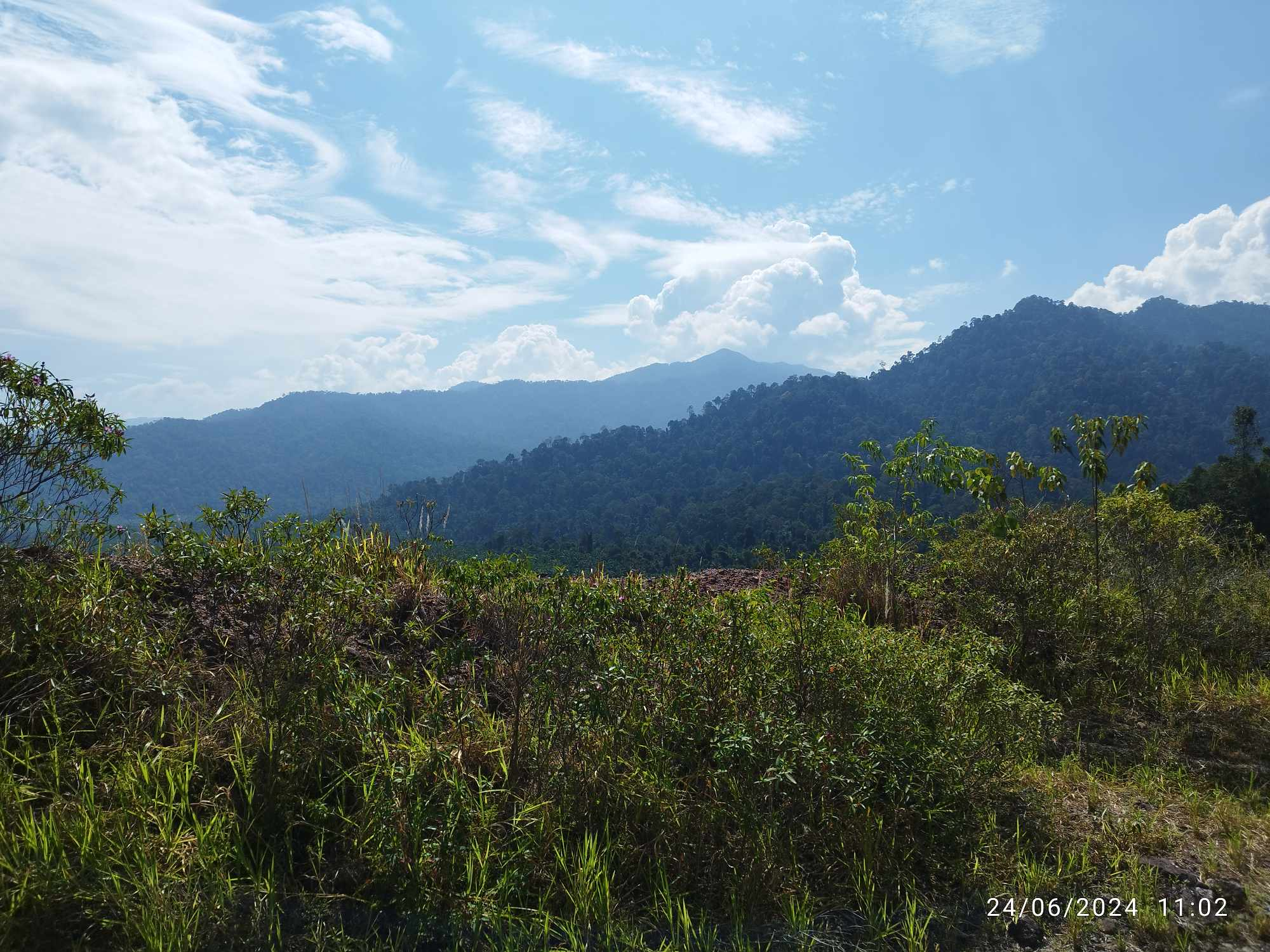
- The Pantai Timur Range in inland Besut District, Terengganu

Highest point
- Peak: Mount Lawit
- Elevation: 1,519 m (4,984 ft)

Dimensions
- Length: 253 km (157 mi) NW/SE
- Width: 54 km (34 mi) W/E

Geography
- Country: Malaysia
- States: Kelantan; Terengganu; Pahang
- Range coordinates: 4°55′11″N 102°40′44″E
- Parent range: Tenasserim Hills
- Borders on: Tahan Range

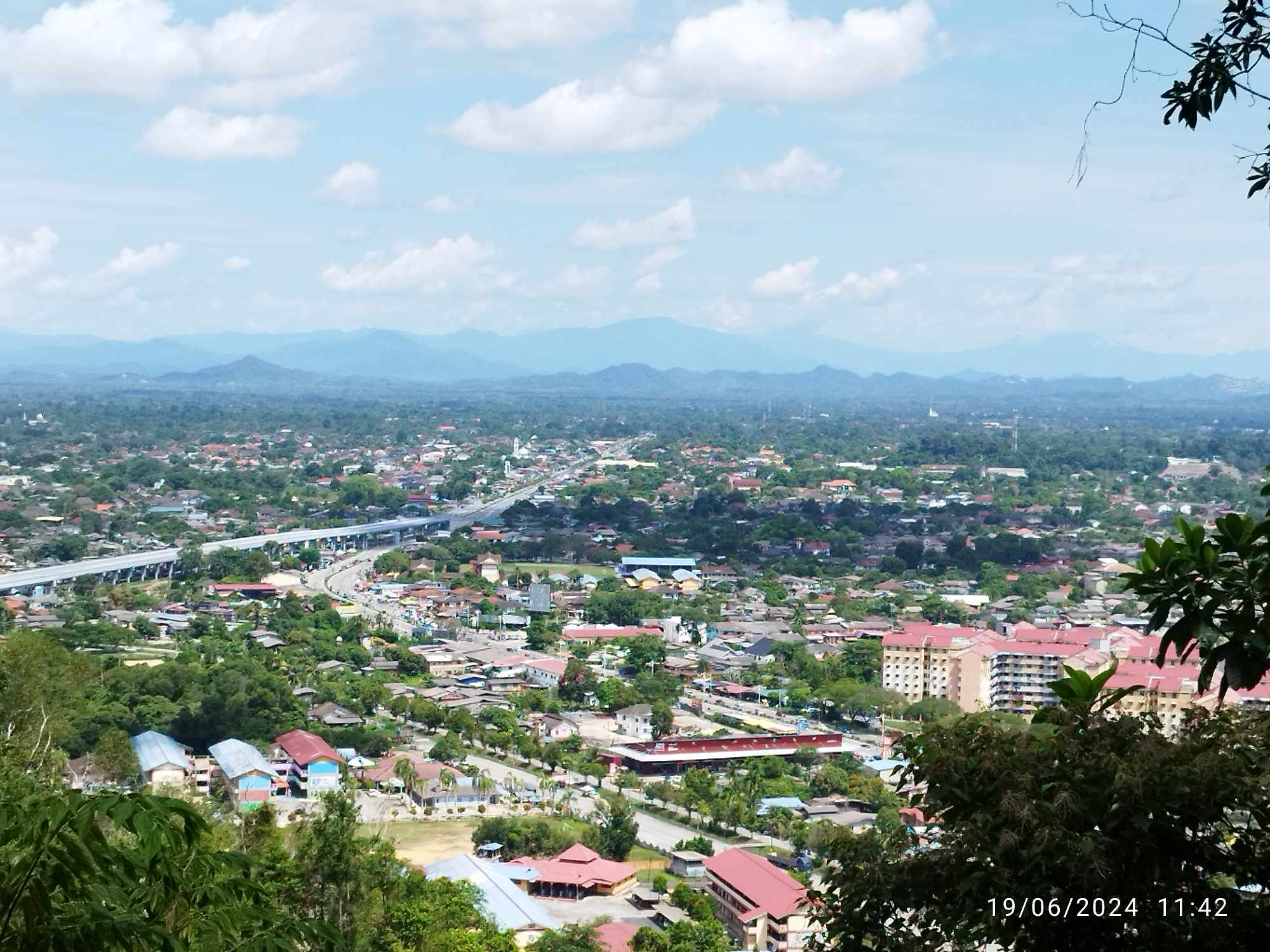
The Pantai Timur Range as seen from Kuala Terengganu, poor visibility due to haze

The Pantai Timur Range (Malay: Banjaran Pantai Timur), also known as the Terengganu Highlands (Malay: Tanah Tinggi Terengganu), is a mountain range situated in the eastern seaboard of Peninsular Malaysia.

== Geography ==
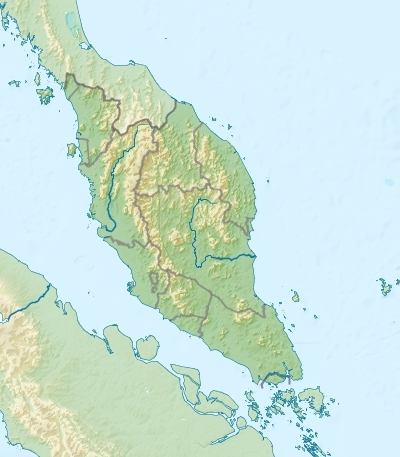
Relief map of Peninsular Malaysia, with the Pantai Timur Range running northwest-southeast along the border between the states of Kelantan, Terengganu and Pahang, parallel to the South China Sea coastline

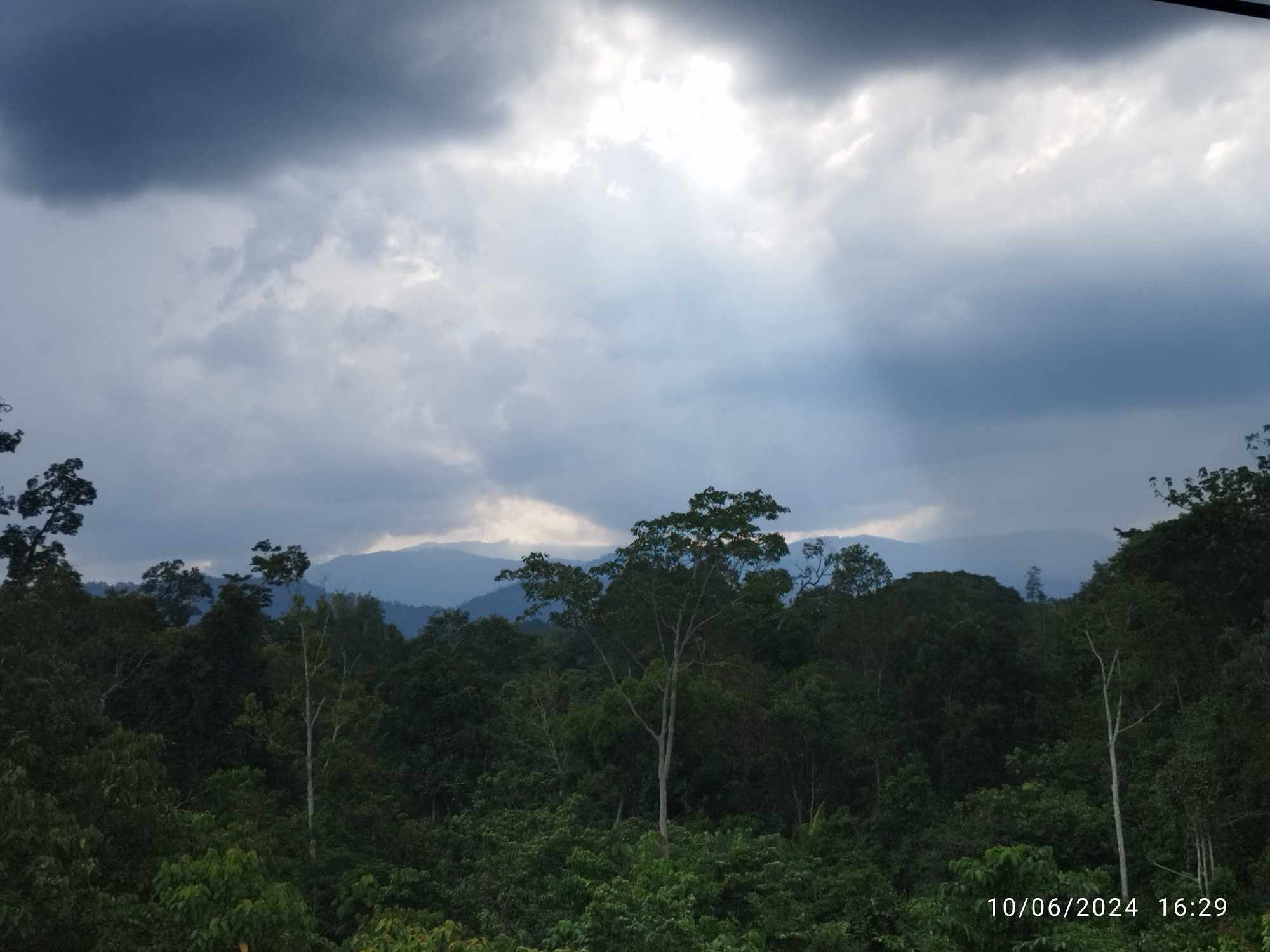
The Pantai Timur Range rises over Jongok Batu, Dungun District, Terengganu.

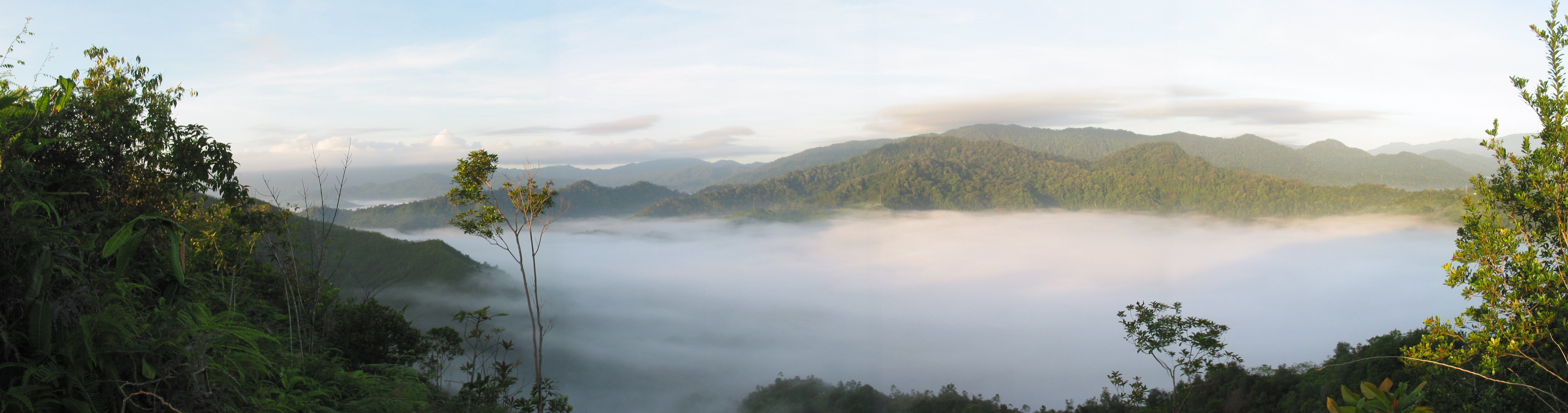
Panoramic view of the southern section of the range near Sungai Lembing, Kuantan District, Pahang.

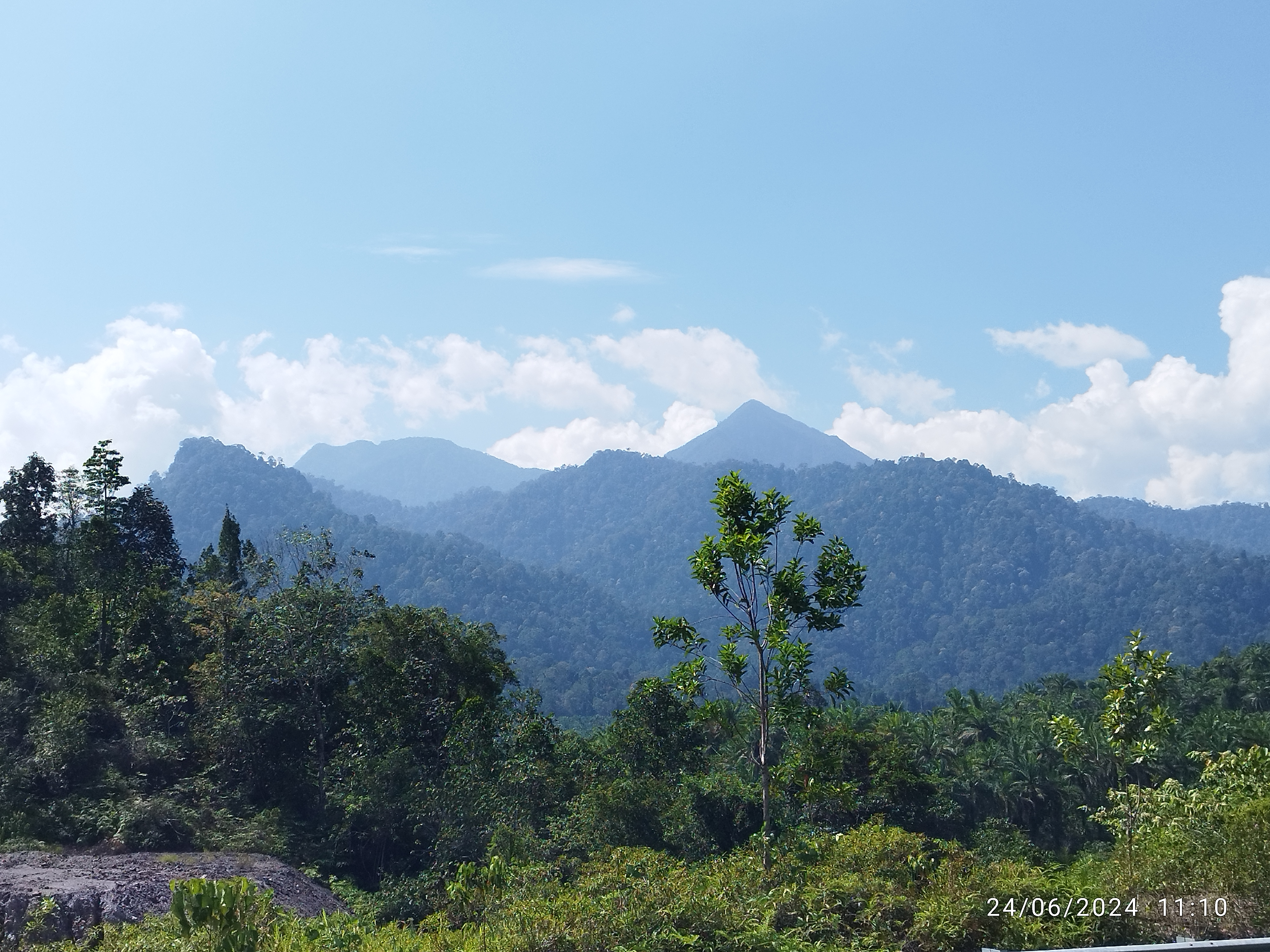
Mts. Batil (right) and Lawit (left)

The Pantai Timur are a subrange of the wider Tenasserim Hills system, that defines the backbone of the Malay Peninsula. It covers Machang, Gua Musang and Kuala Krai Districts in southeastern Kelantan, the western frontier of Terengganu comprising the districts of Besut, Setiu, Hulu Terengganu, Marang, Dungun and Kemaman; and Jerantut and Kuantan Districts in northeastern Pahang. It has an average height of 1,300 metres (4,300 ft) above sea level. The highest elevation is recorded as 1,571 metres (5,154 ft) at an unnamed peak located on the Hulu Terengganu-Dungun district line, which is unofficially known as Terengganu Indah Abadi Peak. The highest officially named mountain is Mount Lawit in Besut at 1,519 metres (4,984 ft) above sea level, of which it remains the de facto highest peak of the entire mountain range.

The Pantai Timur also forms a watershed for major rivers in the states of Terengganu and Pahang, notably the Terengganu River in the east and the Tembeling River in the west, the latter itself is a right tributary of the Pahang River.

== Protected areas ==
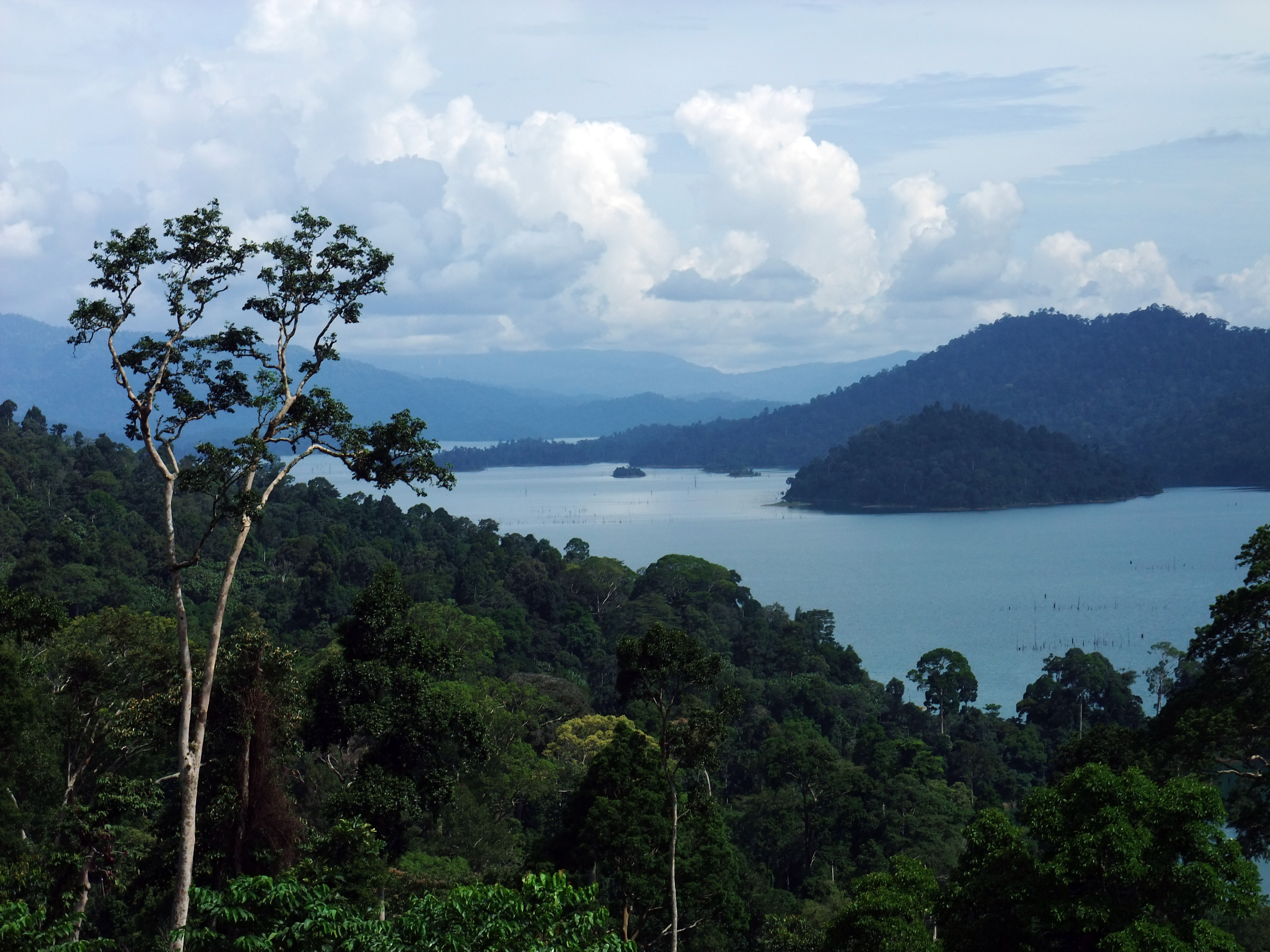
Kenyir Lake, Hulu Terengganu

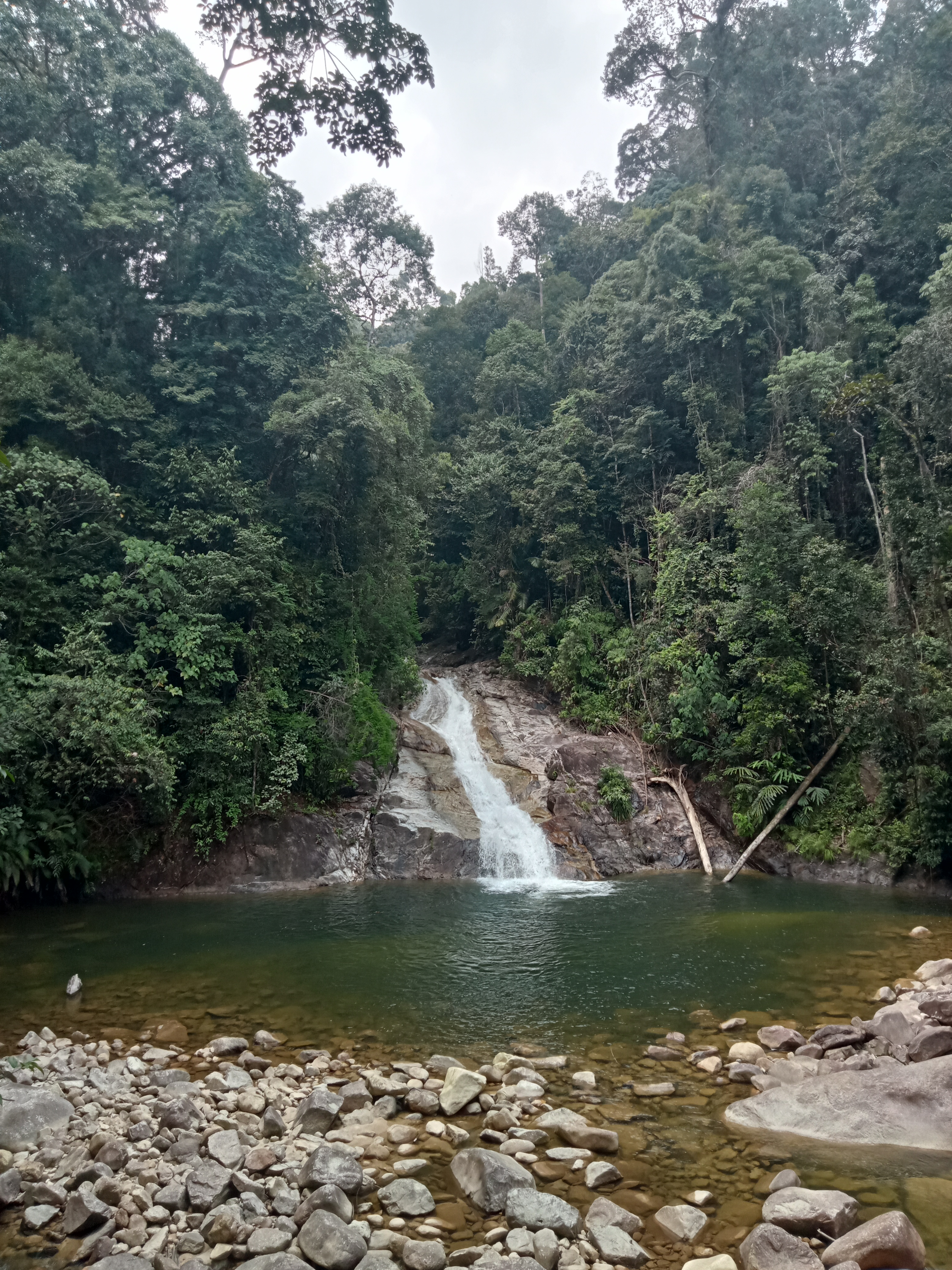
Chemerong Falls, Chemerong Amenity Forest, western Dungun

Several nature reserves are located within the range, such as the Taman Negara and Kenyir Lake – the largest man made lake in Southeast Asia.
