= Mount Lawit (Terengganu) =

Mountain in Terengganu, Malaysia

- Location within Terengganu Location within Malaysia

Highest point
- Elevation: 1,519 m (4,984 ft)
- Prominence: 4,984 m (16,352 ft)
- Listing: Ribu
- Coordinates: 5°25′29″N 102°35′22″E

Naming
- Native name: Gunung Lawit (Malay)

Geography
- Location: Besut District, Terengganu, Malaysia
- Parent range: Pantai Timur Range

Mount Lawit (Malay: Gunung Lawit) is a mountain in Terengganu, Malaysia and has an elevation of 1,519 metres, which makes it the highest mountain in the state. Mount Lawit is situated northeast of Gunong Batil, and northwest of Sungai Susu Dara. Both locations are located in Besut District.

== See also ==
- List of mountains of Malaysia
