= Setiu Wetlands =

Wetland in Setiu, Terengganu, Malaysia

Setiu Wetlands State Park
- Malay: Taman Negeri Setiu Wetlands; Jawi: تامن نݢري ستيو ويتلندس
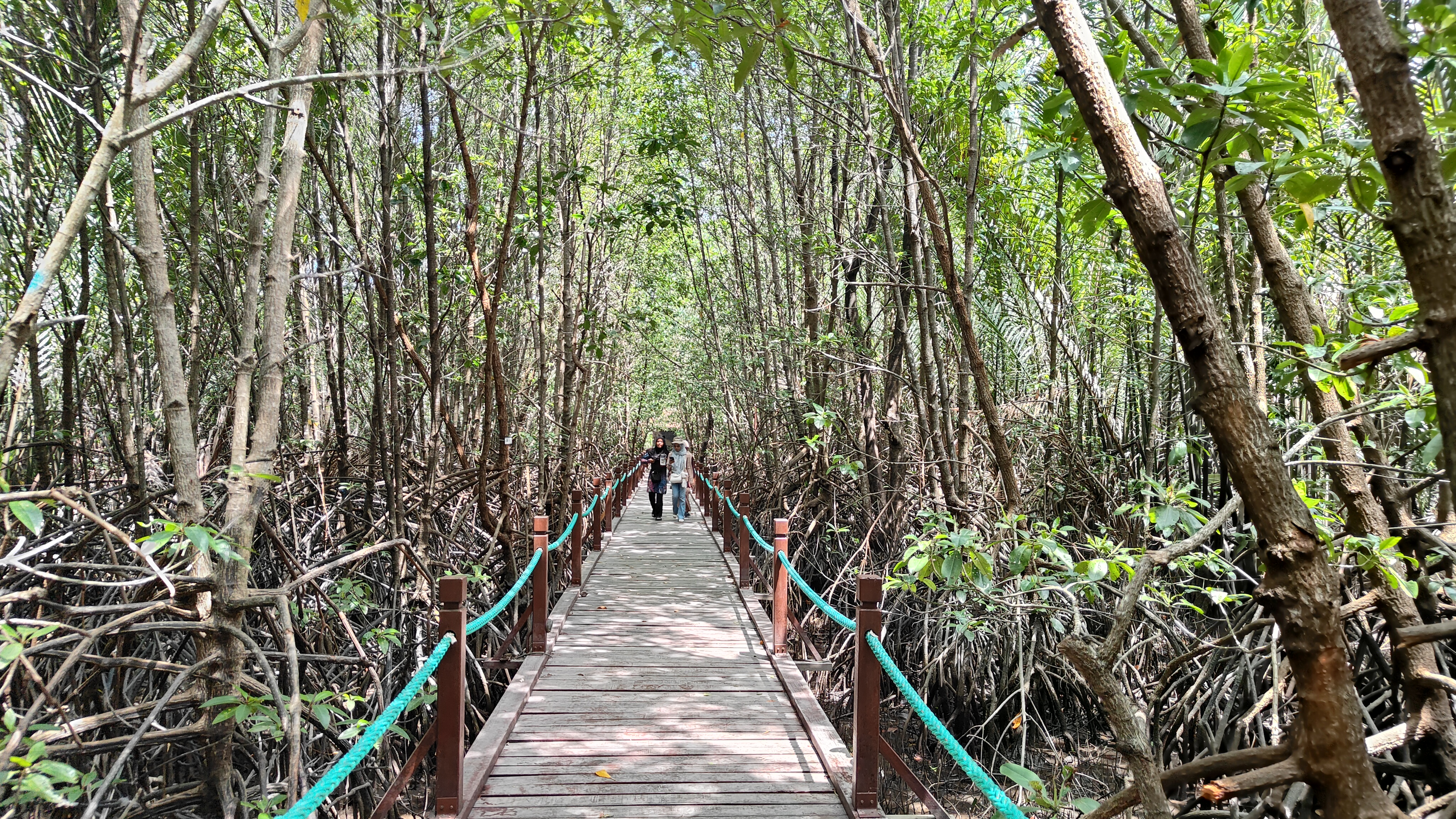
- The boardwalk of Setiu Wetlands that allows visitors to walk throughout the area.

- Location within Terengganu Location within Malaysia
- Location: Setiu, Terengganu, Malaysia
- Coordinates: 5°40′20″N 102°43′04″E
- Type: Freshwater, seawater, and brackish water
- Primary inflows: Setiu River
- Basin countries: Malaysia
- Managing agency: Terengganu State Park Management Council
- Designation: State park
- Max. length: 14 km (8.7 mi) (lagoon)
- Surface area: 23,000 hectares (57,000 acres)

Setiu Wetlands (Malay: Tanah Bencah Setiu or Laguna Setiu) is a wetland in Setiu District, Terengganu, Malaysia. It is part of the Setiu River basin, and also of the larger Setiu-Chalok-Bari-Merang basin wetland complex. Spread over 23,000 hectares, Setiu Wetlands is the largest natural wetlands in the East Coast region of Peninsular Malaysia, combining various ecosystems including freshwater, seawater, brackish water and a 14 km lagoon.

== Access ==
It is less than an hour drive from Kuala Terengganu, the capital of Terengganu. The nearest towns to the wetlands are Penarik and Bandar Permaisuri. Setiu Wetlands is accessed via Pengkalan Gelap.

== Hydrology and ecosystem ==
Approximately 75 per cent of Setiu district is wetland areas, which mainly consists Chalok River basin, Bari River basin, and Merang River basin that converge and form a continuous lagoon. These areas start from the coastal lowland plains of the South China Sea in the east to the hilly areas in western Setiu, that includes Mount Tebu. Setiu Wetlands itself is 26 kilometres long and 1.5 kilometres at its widest section.

Setiu Wetlands is a mixture of riverbank riparian forest, peat swamp, mangroves, brackish lagoons with vegetation and sand islands, seagrass beds and sandy beaches. It is also unique for having a diverse array of interconnected ecosystems, namely the sea, beach, mudflat, lagoon, estuary, river, islands, coastal forest and mangrove forest.

== Flora and fauna ==
The lowland areas forming the Setiu Wetlands contain a large swath of Melaleuca or Gelam trees (also known as paperbark tea-tree) that is rare in this country. The river basin also contains other kinds of coastal swamp and freshwater swamp forest such as nipa palms forest, Bruguiera forest, mixed mangrove forest, Lumnitzera forest, Rhizophora forest, Melaleuca forest, and Avicennia forest. Another feature of Setiu Wetlands is the presence of seagrass beds.

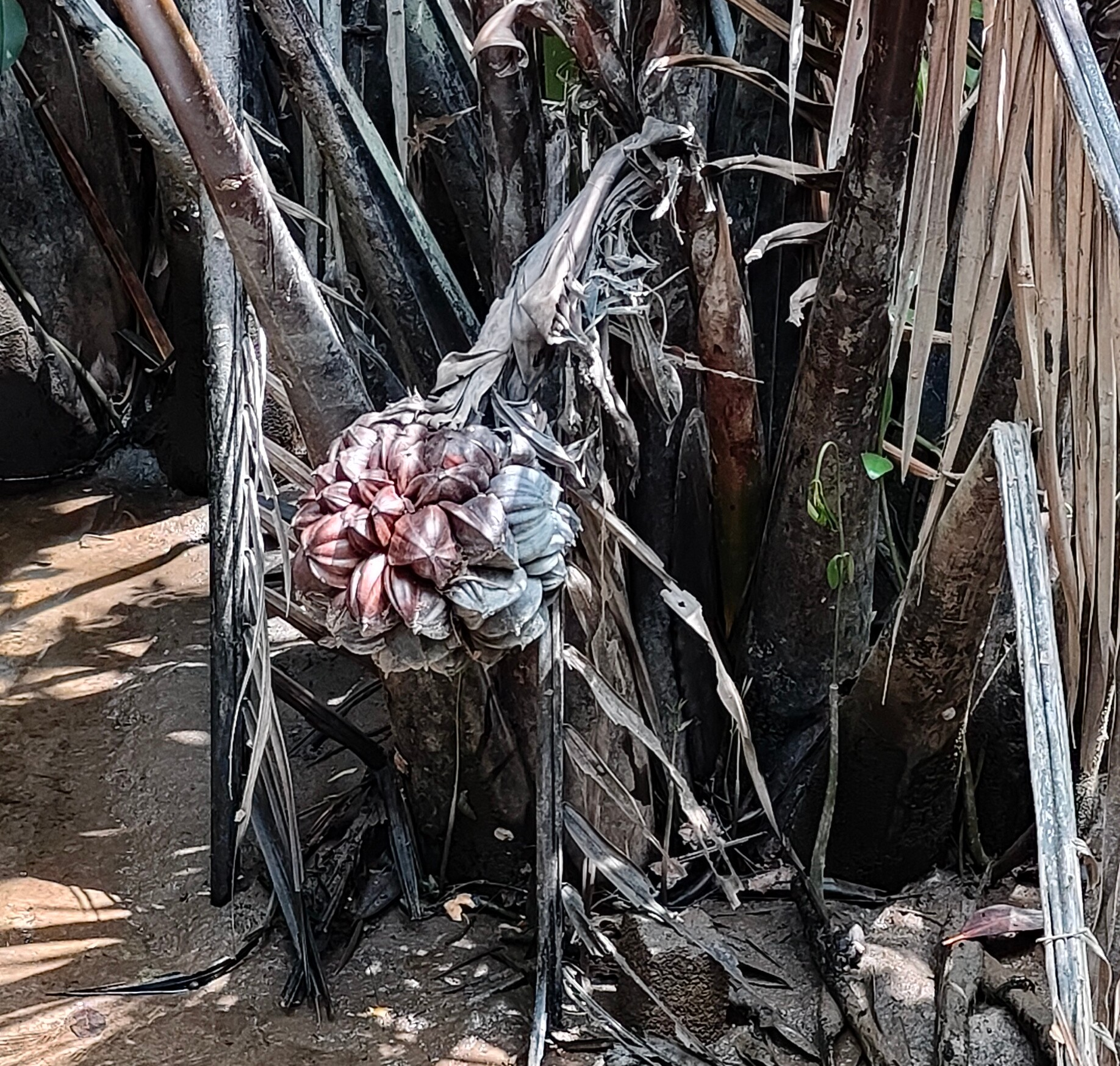
The fruit of nipa palm (Nypa fruticans), a mangrove plant species found in abundance at the park.

The Wetlands is an area of high biodiversity and very hard to find. From a number of research carried out, 29 species of mammals, 161 species of birds, and 36 species of reptiles and amphibias are found. The Wetlands is also home to some endangered species such as river terrapin (Batagur affinis), Painted terrapin (Batagur borneoensis), and Green sea turtle (Chelonia mydas). Besides that, marine animals that includes various invertebrate species (annelid, nematodes and polychaetes), gastropoda species, and bivalvia species (clams, oysters, and mussels as examples), crustaceans are also available. About 37 fish species are discovered in this area, 18 being freshwater species while the rest are saltwater fish species that enter the Wetlands to reproduce.

The Setiu Wetlands is also the only other location where a large colony of the Papilionanthe hookeriana, which is an orchid species, can be found. It is also known as Kinta weed and, as the name suggests, its other habitat is in the swamps of the Kinta Valley in Perak. This orchid species is protected in the state. Scientists from the Malaysian Agricultural Research and Development Institute (MARDI) have also discovered a new variety of the nepenthes rafflesiana, a type of pitcher plant in the wetlands.

== Culture ==
Setiu Wetlands is a major aquaculture spot. The local residents are involved in brackish water cage culture, pond culture, pen culture and oyster farming. It is a large producer of grouper and oyster seeds. Other than that, the lagoon is also a natural harbour for fishing boats of the fishermen surrounding the area. Local industries at the local villages such as the production of seafood-based delicacies such as budu (fermented fish sauce), fish crackers, dried anchovies and belacan (shrimp paste). Small fishing boat-making industry is also carried out by the villagers. The locals also make handicrafts from kercut and nipah, long-stemmed grass that grows wild in swampy areas.

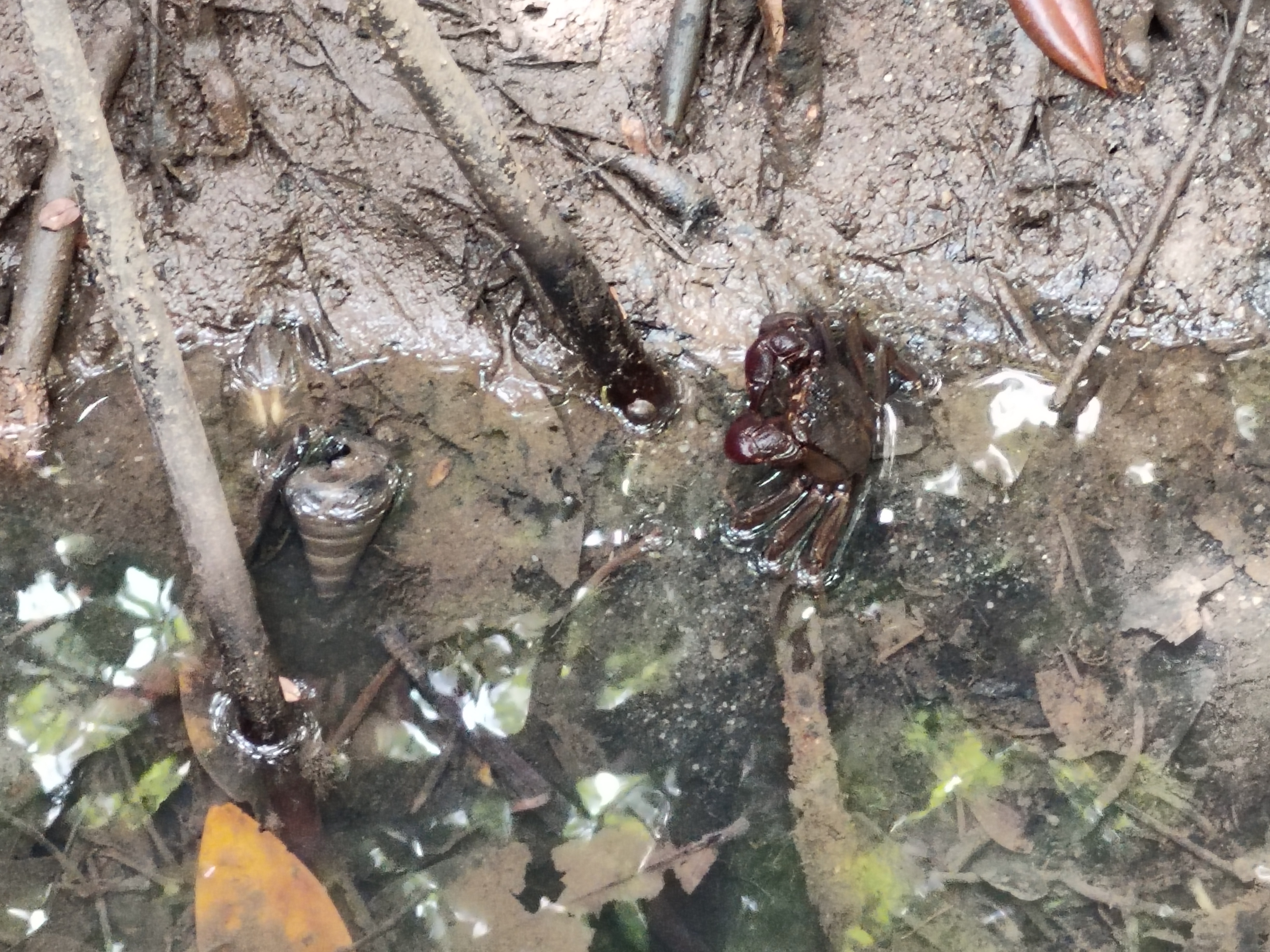
A species of mangrove crab and snail (Cerithidea sp.) that make the mangrove area their habitat.

== Setiu Wetlands State Park ==
The Government of Terengganu stated that the park would be gazetted as the first State Park in Terengganu in 2015 (although Terengganu has a national park within its boundary, and a few marine parks). The decision to create the State Park came due to biological diversity of the area, the protection of the natural environment, and the potentials for ecotourism. The early phase of the park involved an area the size of 400 hectares. On 10 May 2018, the Terengganu State Government officially declared Setiu Wetlands as the first state park in Terengganu, which was named as Setiu Wetlands State Park.

== Gallery ==
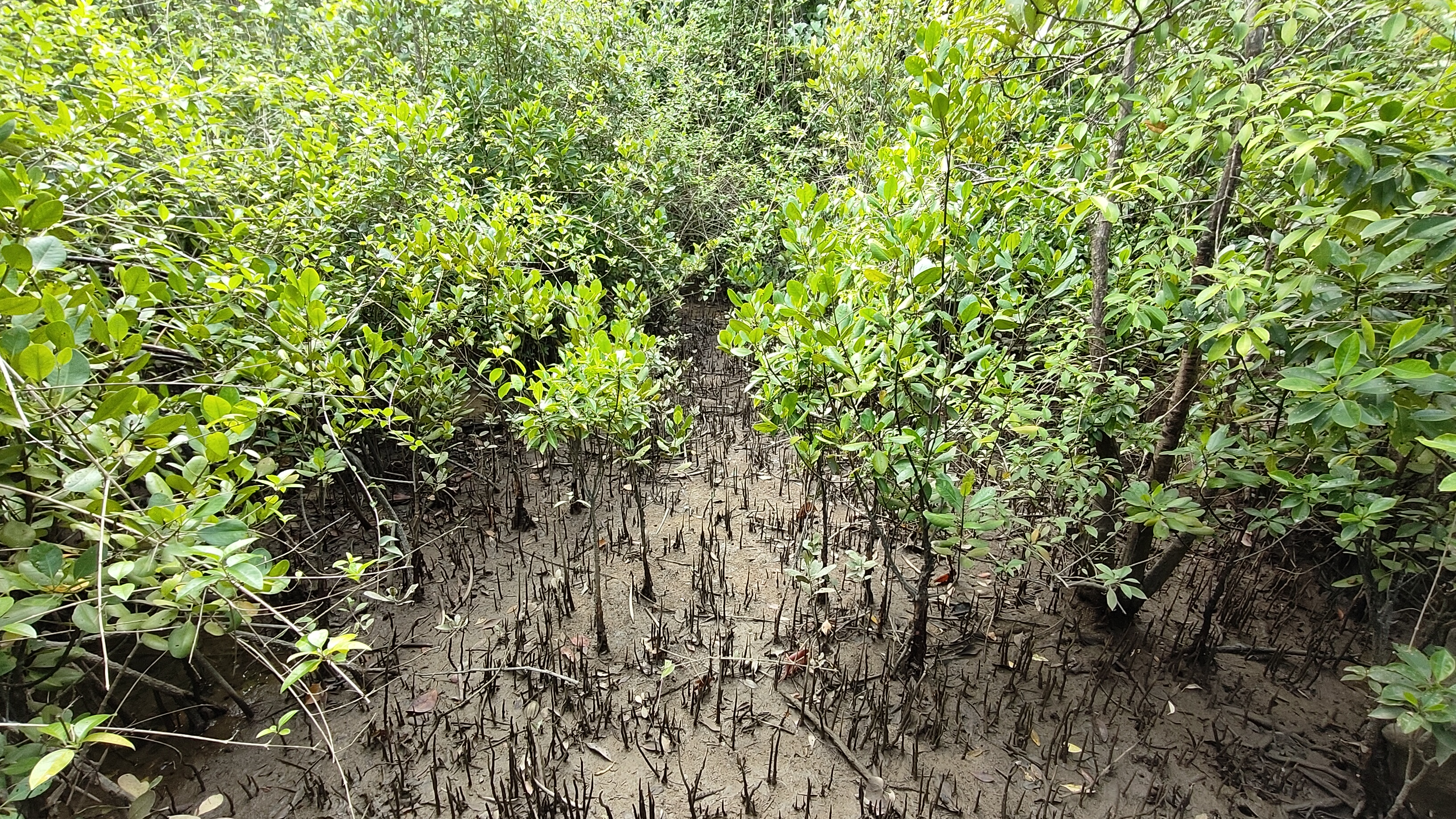
Pneumatophores of the mangrove trees found at Setiu Wetlands State Park.

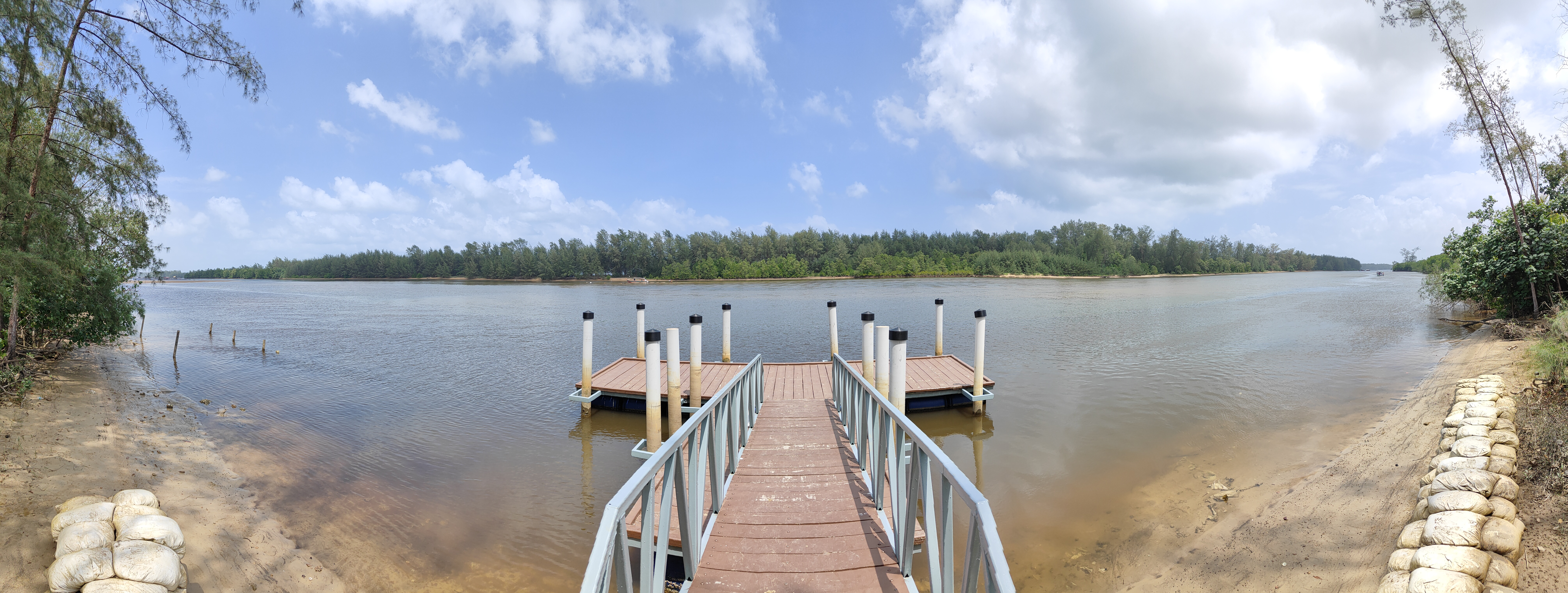
The brackish water lagoon that forms part of the ecosystem of Setiu Wetlands.

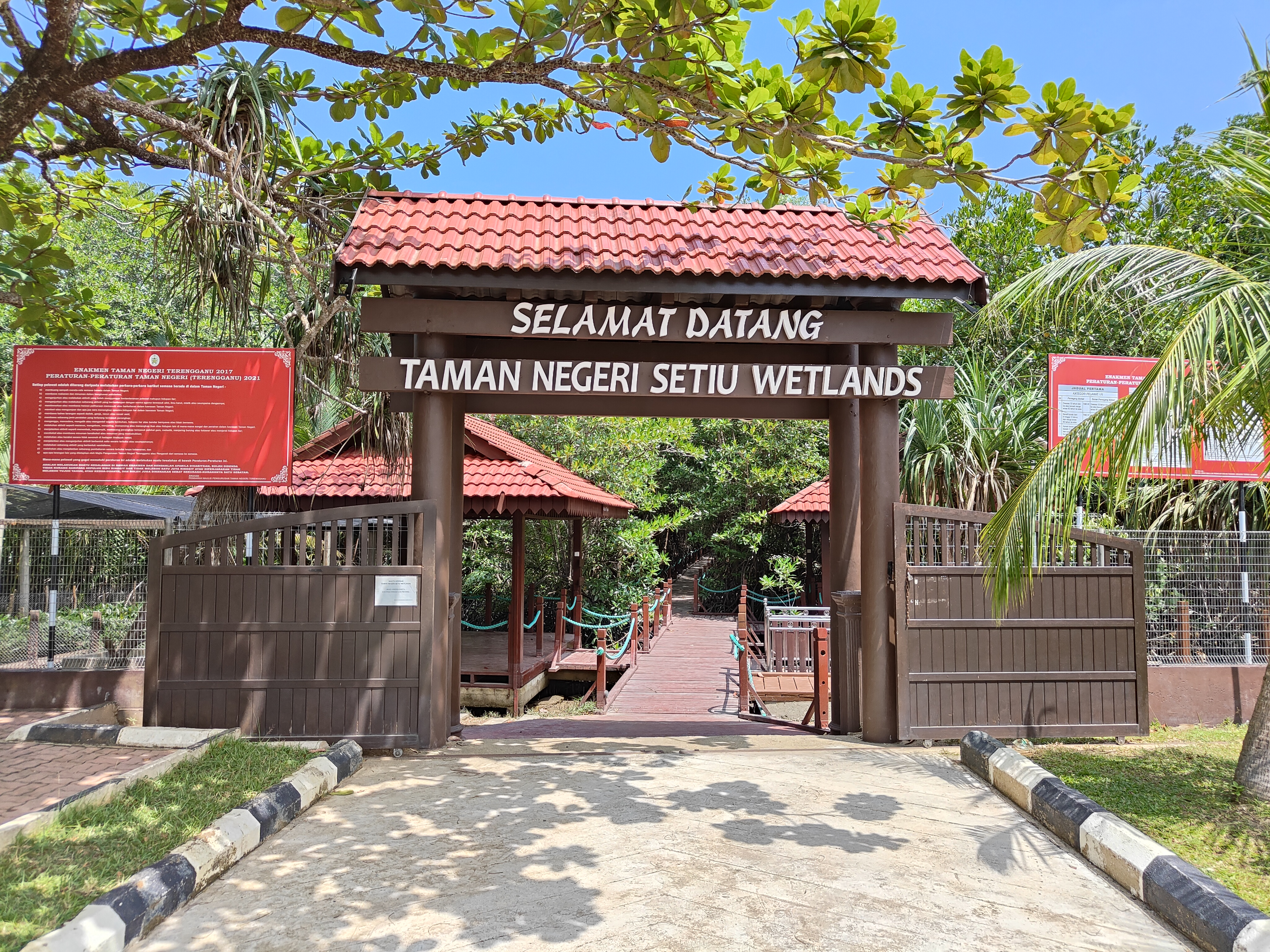
The entrance of Setiu Wetlands State Park.

== See also ==
- Kenyir Lake, the second state park of Terengganu
- List of national parks in Malaysia
