= Tourism in Terengganu =

There are many attractions, events and facilities in Terengganu, Malaysia, of special interest to tourists.

Terengganu used to be one of Malaysia's poorest states until oil and gas were discovered off its coastline not too long ago. There are huge petrochemical and gas processing plants and supporting petroleum based industries near Paka and Kerteh, involving many joint ventures between Petronas, the Malaysian national oil company and foreign multinationals. Agriculture and fishing are still major industries while tourism is fast becoming a major economic contributor.

Terengganu has a coastline of beaches, and lush tropical rainforests. Terengganu Malays retain many customs and traditions, that are visible in unique arts and crafts and cuisine.

== Geography and climate ==
Terengganu is a state in Malaysia, located partly on an east coast region of Peninsular Malaysia. To the north and west lies the state of Kelantan while the state of Pahang borders to its south. Terengganu covers a land area of 12,995 km^{2} with 244 km of scenic coastline overlooking the South China Sea.

Terengganu boasts a fine tropical climate, with uniform temperatures averaging from 23-33 degrees Celsius and a mean humidity of about 90%. Rainfall is copious, accounting for Terengganu's lush rainforest and vegetation. Generally two seasons are distinguished: the rainy/wet season and the dry season. The wet season goes from November until February, with the onset of the northeast monsoon in Peninsular Malaysia. Other months are dry with occasional wet weather.

== Destinations and attractions ==
=== Kuala Terengganu ===
- Kuala Terengganu - the capital and largest city of Terengganu. The heritage waterfront city, is strategically located on the banks of the Terengganu River.
- Terengganu Handicraft Centre - A must visit for handicraft enthusiast; the Terengganu Handicraft Centre boasts diverse wares that Terengganu is famous for. From hand woven baskets to pandanus (mengkuang) mat weaving, from wood carvings to songket weaving, brassware as well as the exquisite hand drawn and block imprints, everything is all here. Each creation, unique with the unmistakable feel of Terengganu, are done meticulously with skills passed from one generation to the next thus retaining its originality. The Handicraft centre is situated in Kuala Ibai, 6 km from the town centre.
- Tengku Tengah Zaharah Mosque - This mosque is situated on a 5-acre of reclaimed land in Kuala Ibai, with its foundation built in the lagoon of Ibai river. During high tide, the water rises covering the foundation creates illusions of a floating mosque.
- Bulatan Batu Bersurat (Inscribed Stone Roundabout) - Syed Hussin Gulam al-Bukhari, who discovered the stone tablet in Kampung Buluh, Kuala Berang in 1903, realized the historical significance of the Romanized Arabic-like text inscriptions on the stone. It is one of the most important historical evidence of an Islamic decree in scripted by a local ruler, dated 1303. The stone is an evidence of one of the earliest Islamic government in the Malay Peninsula. The inscriptions on the stone explain the decree and enforcement of Islamic laws and its punishments. Today, a replica of the stone has been built as a memorial in Kampung Buluh, Kuala Berang and another mammoth replica at a roundabout in Kuala Terengganu. The original is prominently displayed at the State Museum.
- Dataran Shahbandar (Shahbandar City Square) - Located in the heart of the city overlooking the scenic Pulau Duyong in the estuary of Terengganu River, it is a place to relax and unwind while watching local fishermen returning from the sea. The weekend market every Fridays attracted locals and foreigners alike. Among goods sold are second hand garments, leather goods, bundle shoes, household products, local delicacies and children toys. This City Square is also the main venue for carnival events and performances.
- Taman Awam Batu Buruk (Batu Buruk Recreational Park) - The recreation park is a preferred place for weekend holiday retreats in Kuala Terengganu. Feel the cool breeze while strolling on the wide stretch of sandy beach overlooking South China Sea. A children's playground, horse riding activity, jogging tracks, toilets, eating stalls and performance stage are available. Locals and tourists alike flock the beach spending quality time with the family and the loved ones. Watch kite flying during windy season.
- Medan Maziah (Maziah Garden) - Medan Maziah was originally a part of the Istana Maziah compound. A sizeable had been turned into a landscaped garden. There is a gigantic replica of betel leaves canister or tepak sireh which symbolizes the half-forgotten betel leaves eating era of the yester years.
- Noor Arfa Craft Complex - Situated in Chendering, Noor Arfa is a pioneer of the much acclaimed batik industry in Malaysia. Their principle to always improvise and striving for the best in batik designs have won the admiration and recognition in Malaysia. With its meticulous design and high quality fabrics, Noor Arfa has achieved the status and rare distinction of being the largest batik producer in the country. Their branches spread to most major cities in Malaysia. Noor Arfa Craft Complex not only focuses on the manufacturing activity. It is one of Malaysia's largest batik showrooms. There are also handicrafts and batik demonstrators which provide opportunity for visitors to learn and watch the meticulous and artistic skills passed from previous generation.
- Bukit Puteri (Princess Hill) - Bukit Puteri is a 208-metre hill that is rich in history. Situated next to the Istana Maziah, the hill's name literally means The Princess Hill. It was formerly a fortress believed to have been built in the 1820s. At present what remains is a large brass bell known as Genta. It was struck during emergencies as well as notification of important festivals and royal events, chimed at different message tone to the surrounding townsfolk. There are also a family of cannons, flagpole, a lighthouse, cemetery and a fort. Bukit Puteri is accessible from the new Waterfront Heritage Bazaar.
- Bazar Warisan (Heritage Bazaar) - A visit to Terengganu will not be complete without spending time at this well known market. Visitors will find ample parking spaces in the multi-tiered car park. The market offers varieties of traditional handicrafts from souvenirs to songket, batik, handicraft products, keris, brassware, T-shirts, ladies garment and silk. The Bazaar is opened daily from as early as 7.00 am until 6.00 pm.
- Pulau Warisan (The Waterfront) - This is one of the recent landmarks in Kuala Terengganu. With a garden concept in mind, the waterfront is landscaped overlooking the Terengganu River, thus making it the perfect spot to relax while enjoying the cool breeze. Adding to the comfort and convenience are ample parking spaces, food stalls, children playground, toilet facilities and river cruise jetty.
- Keropok Lekor at Kampong Losong - Some call them fish fritters, fish sausages or fish sticks but in Terengganu, they are called keropok. There are two three types of keropok, mainly keropok lekor (boiled chewy ones), keropok goreng (fried chewy ones) and keropok keping (sliced, sun-dried and fried). There is none better than those found in Kampong Losong. Keropok lekor are actually made from processed fish meat mixed with salt and sagoo flour. This mixture is then hand rolled into sausage shaped around 6 to 10 inches long and immediately cooked. It is an afternoon snack normally dipped in Terengganu's equally famous chili sauce.
- Chinatown, Kuala Terengganu (Kampong China) - Chinatown in Kuala Terengganu is first established by the Chinese community in the late 19th century. It was once a hub for commercial activities that help shape Kuala Terengganu into what it is today. The Chinese built the traditionally designed shop houses according to their place of origin in China. The buildings have been declared a heritage site by the United Nations' UNESCO World Monument Watch Programme and grants are being given annually to finance preservation of this pre-colonial heritage significant.
- Terengganu State Museum - It is acclaimed as the largest of its kind in Malaysia. The Terengganu State Museum houses century old artifacts and artworks of rich and colourful heritage. Located on 27 hectares of land in Bukit Losong, Kuala Terengganu, the complex itself is an impressive architectural feature, based on the designs of the ancient Terengganu palace.
- Redang Island - Of all the islands in Terengganu, the island is perhaps blessed with development and tourism infrastructures. To date, chalets and resorts have mushroomed to cater for the ever-increasing tourist arrivals. There is a small airport for a direct flight from Subang Airport, Kuala Lumpur and Seletar Airport, Singapore, operated by Berjaya Air. Most of the arrival is via Merang Jetty in Setiu. The Fisheries Act of 1985 declared Redang and its archipelago as a marine park. In Marine Park located in Pulau Pinang, visitors can hand-feed the fishes while snorkeling. In fact, the whole of the island offers abundance of marine lives, coral gardens and a few ship wrecks which are definite thrills and excitements for scuba-divers.
- Bidong Island - It was internationally well known as the relocation center for Vietnamese refugees from the mid-1970s until it was closed in the early 1990s. The state government decided that no accommodation facilities are to be built on the island. Remnants of hospital, school, sundry shops and warehouse are a stark reminder of what is used to be home to thousands of boat people. There is a turtle research centre led by a local university and an underwater gallery that hosts replicas of Inscribed Stone (Batu Bersurat), a Keris, a traditional sampan and betel chewing canisters (tepak sireh) located 15m underwater.
- Lang Tengah Island - Its name is derived from the sea eagles that breed on this picturesque island. The island is accessible via Merang Jetty in Setiu. Located between Pulau Perhentian and Pulau Redang, Pulau Lang Tengah's

natural habitat remains untouched. The jungles are still retains its natural eco system. There are only four resorts with their own private beach.

=== Besut ===
Besut is the northernmost district in Terengganu, bordering with Kelantan. Jertih is the commercial hub while Kampung Raja is the administrative centre. Besut's destinations include Pulau Perhentian, Pulau Rhu, the waterfalls of Lata Tembakah, the Kampung La Hot Spring, Pantai Bukit Keluang, Pantai Air Tawar and Pantai Dendong. Besut is also home to a cottage industry that includes wood carving, leather crafts, and rattan weaving.

=== Setiu ===
It is believed that Setiu got its name from a Bugis chieftain, who, after months of travelling all the way from Sumatera, decided to stay in Setiu for good. Bandar Permaisuri, which means Queen's Town, is the district capital as well as the administrative centre. Setiu is known for its beaches, its traditional fishing villages and its nature. Another attraction in Setiu is its wetland areas.
