= Terengganu =

State of Malaysia

Terengganu Tranung
- State
- State of Terengganu; Negeri Terengganu (Malay)
- Flag Coat of arms
- Nickname(s): Negeri Penyu (Turtle state); Darul Iman (Abode of Faith)
- Motto: Maju, Berkat dan Sejahtera (English: "Advanced, Blessed and Prosperous")
- Anthem: Selamat Sultan
- Terengganu in Malaysia
- Country: Malaysia
- The earliest recorded settlement: 6th century
- As an independent sultanate: 1725
- Siamese control: 19th century
- British control: 1909
- Japanese occupation: 1942
- Accession into the Federation of Malaya: 1948
- Malayan Declaration of Independence: 31 August 1957
- Proclamation of Malaysia: 16 September 1963
- Capital and largest city: Kuala Terengganu; 05°19′45″N 103°08′10″E
- Official languages: Malay
- Recognised regional languages: Terengganu Malay; Kelantan Malay; Semaq Beri; Bateq; Others
- Ethnic groups (2020): 97.6% Bumiputera; 95% Malay; 2.6% Orang Asli; 2.1% Chinese; 0.2% Indian; 0.2% Other ethnicities
- Religion (2020): 97.3% Sunni Islam (official); 2.0% Buddhism; 0.3% Christianity; 0.2% Hinduism; 0.1% Others
- Demonym(s): Terengganuan; Ganu
- Government: Federated parliamentary constitutional monarchy under a dominant-party system
  - Sultan: Mizan Zainal Abidin
  - Menteri Besar: Ahmad Samsuri Mokhtar (PN–PAS)
- Legislature: Legislative Assembly

Area
  - Total: 13,035 km^{2} (5,033 sq mi)
- Highest elevation (Mount Lawit): 1,519 m (4,984 ft)

Population
  - 2020 census: 1,149,440
  - Density: 89/km^{2} (230.5/sq mi) (10th)
- GDP (PPP): 2023 estimate
  - Total: $26.311 billion (12th)
  - Per capita: $21,756 (12th)
- GDP (nominal): 2023 estimate
  - Total: $8.251 billion (12th)
  - Per capita: $6,823 (15th)
- Gini (2022): ▼0.326 low
- HDI (2024): ▲0.793 high · 12th
- Currency: Malaysian ringgit (RM/MYR)
- Time zone: UTC+8 (Malaysian Time)
- Date format: dd-mm-yyyy
- Driving side: Left
- Calling code: 09
- Postal code: 20xxx to 24xxx
- ISO 3166 code: MY-11
- Website: terengganu.gov.my

Terengganu (Malay pronunciation: [tərəŋɡanu]; Terengganu Malay: Tranung, formerly spelled Trengganu or Tringganu) is a sultanate and federal state of Malaysia. The state is also known by its Arabic honorific, Dāru l-Īmān ("Abode of Faith"). The coastal city of Kuala Terengganu, at the mouth of the Terengganu River, is both the state and royal capital as well as the most populous city in Terengganu. Other major cities and towns include Jerteh, Kuala Dungun, Chukai, Kuala Berang, Marang, and Permaisuri. At 13,035 square kilometres (5,033 sq mi) in size and a population of over 1.2 million people in 2023, Terengganu is Malaysia's 7th largest state and 10th most populated. Terengganu, along with Kelantan and the Federal Territory of Putrajaya, is one of the most homogeneous states/territories in the country of which 95% of the population are ethnic Malay-Muslims with its own distinct language/dialect, culture, history, and tradition.

Located on the east coast of Peninsular Malaysia, Terengganu borders the state of Kelantan to the north, Pahang to the west and south, and the South China Sea to the east. Terengganu is geographically divided into sparsely populated and mountainous inland (known as the Terengganu Highlands of which the highest point is Mount Lawit at 1,519 metres (4,984 ft)) that span from the border with Kelantan to Kemaman district and largely flat coastal plains where most of the state's 1.1 million people are concentrated. The state is known for having the longest coastline in Peninsular Malaysia and achieved an entry in the Malaysian Book of Records for having the cleanest beach in the country. Many of the most popular islands in Malaysia are located in the state such as Perhentian, Kapas, and Redang islands, as well as Bidong Island, once a refuge to tens of thousands of Vietnamese refugees in the 1970s.

== Etymology ==
There are several theories on the origin of the name "Terengganu". One theory attributes the name's origin to terang ganu, Malay for 'bright rainbow'. Another story, said to have been originally narrated by the ninth Sultan of Terengganu, Baginda Omar, tells of a party of hunters from Pahang roving and hunting in the area of what is now southern Terengganu. One of the hunters spotted a large animal fang lying on the ground. A fellow party member asked what animal the fang belonged too. The hunter, not knowing which animal, simply answered taring anu (Malay: 'fang of something'). The party later returned to Pahang with a rich hoard of game, fur and sandalwood, which impressed their neighbours. They asked the hunters where they sourced their riches, to which they replied, from the land of taring anu, which later evolved into Terengganu. Terengganu was called Trangkanu (Thai: ตรังกานู) by the Siamese when it was under their influence. Terengganuans usually pronounce Terengganu as Tranung or Ganu with the G often being emphasized.

=== Chinese naming ===
The traditional Chinese name for Terengganu has been "丁加奴" (pinyin: dīngjiānú), which is a direct transcription of the Malay name. However, in recent years, the Chinese community in Terengganu has raised objections to the name, citing that the characters used loosely translate to "giving birth to a child who will become a slave". Therefore, they successfully petitioned the regulatory commission for Chinese language in Malaysia to change the Chinese name for the state to "登嘉楼" (pinyin: dēngjiālóu), which can be loosely translated to "aspiring/stepping up to a higher level", in September 2004. The new name was in unofficial use by the state's Chinese community for at least 30 years before its official adoption.

Certain segments of the Chinese community opposed the name change, citing the fact that the new name contains too many character strokes, making it much more difficult to write. They have proposed to revert the name to the version used before 2004, but with the word "奴" (slave, which was mainly the cause of the controversy) to the similar sounding, but more positive "努" (perseverance).

== History ==
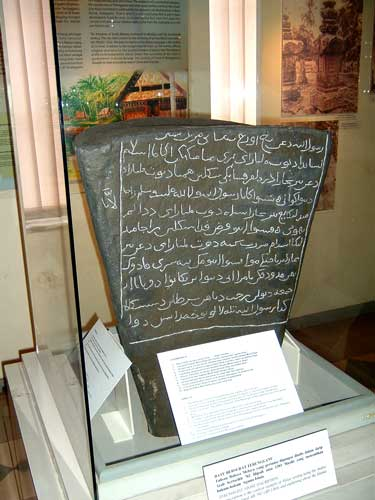
The Terengganu Inscription Stone. The Jawi alphabet inscriptions are of local laws influenced by Sharia and thus one of the earliest proof of Islamic influence in Malaysia

=== Prehistory ===
Human activity may have been present in Terengganu as early as 16,000 years ago during the Paleolithic era as evidenced by the discovery of a skeleton in Gua Bewah, Hulu Terengganu in 2009. The skeleton, called Bewah Man (Malay: Orang Bewah), has been analyzed as 5,000 years older than skeletons found in Perak, making it the oldest known modern human skeleton in the country.

=== Hindu-Buddhist Era ===
Terengganu's location by the South China Sea ensured that it was on trade routes since ancient times. Based on Ptolemy's 2nd atlus Geography referred to what is now Terengannu as either Perimula, Kole Polis or Tharra. The earliest written reports on the area that mentioned the name "Terengganu" were by Chinese merchants and seafarers in the early 6th century A.D. During the early Hindu–Buddhist period, Terengganu was known as Tan-Tan which is based in what is now Kuala Telemong. It was a small ancient polity that came under the influence of Langkasuka, a powerful kingdom based either in Kedah or Patani in the 1st century AD. In the 7th century, the dynasty of Langkasuka that once ruled over Terengganu was replaced by a new kingdom called Srivijaya. Under Srivijaya, Terengganu traded extensively with other kingdoms in the Malay Peninsula, Borneo and Sumatra, Champa, the Khmer Empire, the Majapahit Empire and especially the Chinese.

=== Medieval and early modern period ===
Terengganu was the first Malay state to receive Islam, as attested to by the Terengganu Inscription Stone with Arabic inscriptions found in Kuala Berang, the capital of the district of Hulu Terengganu. The inscribed date which is incomplete due to damage can be read as various dates from 702 to 789 AH (1303 to 1387 CE). Terengganu became a vassal state of Malacca, but retained considerable autonomy with the emergence of the Johor Sultanate. In 1710, the Thai kingdom of Ayutthaya invaded Terengganu, but as the Johoreans prepared to repel the attack on their dependency, the Ayutthaya forces diverted to fight a Vietnamese attack in Cambodia. At the end of the Malacca-Johor dynasty in 1699, Terengganu had emerged as a key supplier of pepper for Chinese merchants and perahu of the eastern archipelago, although the polity only had 500 warriors and no fleets. After being defeated in Johor's civil war in 1718, Sultan Abdul Jalil Shah IV of Johor fled to Terengganu. He set up a rival court and handed out important titles to the local chiefs, drawing Terengganu into the forefront of Malay politics.

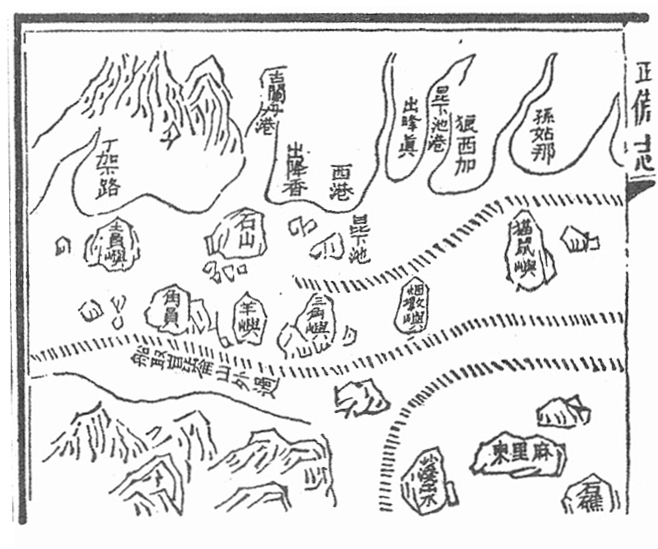
A Mao Kun map from Wubei Zhi which comes from the 15th century navigation maps of Zheng He showing Terengganu (丁架路) at the top left

Terengganu emerged as an independent sultanate in 1724. The first sultan was Tun Zainal Abidin, the younger brother of a former sultan of Johor, and Johor strongly influenced Terengganu's politics through the 18th century. However, in the book Tuhfat al-Nafis, the author, Raja Ali Haji, mentions that in 1725, Tun Zainal Abidin was installed as the Sultan of Terengganu by Daeng Menampuk – also known as Raja Tua – under the rule of Sultan Sulaiman Badrul Alam Shah of Johor. Meanwhile, oral tradition records that Zainal Abidin was installed as sultan by the Patani Queen.

Scottish sailor Alexander Hamilton was known to have made several recorded visits to Terengganu in 1719 and 1720.

In 1741, Sultan Sulaiman installed Sultan Mansur as ruler of Terengganu, his rule from 1741 to 1793 saw him creating a strong united Malay front against the rising power of the Bugis. He expanded his power on a weakened and divided Kelantan in 1764, culminating in his son's marriage to the daughter of the ruler of Kelantan. European accounts of the time praised the well-ordered administration of his rule, while at the same time he was highly respected by his subjects.

In the 19th century, Terengganu became a vassal state of the Thai Rattanakosin Kingdom, and sent tribute every year called bunga mas. This occurred under the reign of Sultan Omar Riayat Shah, who was remembered as a devout ruler who promoted trade and stable government. Terengganu prospered, and was largely left alone by the authorities in Bangkok unlike in neighbouring Patani and Kelantan. The period also witnessed the existence of a Terengganuan vassal of Besut Darul Iman.

=== Modern era ===
The terms of the Anglo-Siamese Treaty of 1909 saw power over Terengganu transferred from Siam to Britain. A British advisor was appointed to the sultan in 1919, and Terengganu become one of the Unfederated Malay States. The move was highly unpopular spurring several uprisings in 1922 and 1925 before climaxing in May 1928 with the Peasant's Rebellion (Pemberontakan Tani) led by Abdul Rahman Limbong which was quashed by British military force.

During World War II, Japan occupied Terengganu and transferred sovereignty over the state back to Siam – which had been renamed Thailand in 1939 – along with Kelantan, Kedah, and Perlis. After the defeat of Japan, British control over these Malay states was reestablished. Terengganu became a member of the Federation of Malaya in 1948, then a state of a sovereign Malaya in 1957, which became Malaysia in 1963.

Following decades of rule by the Barisan Nasional coalition, the Pan-Malaysian Islamic Party (PAS) came to power in 1999, making Terengganu the second state in Malaysia to be ruled by the Islamist party (the first being neighbouring Kelantan). Barisan Nasional were brought back into power in Terengganu in the 2004 Malaysian general election, which continued to govern it until the 2018 Malaysian general election.

== Geography ==
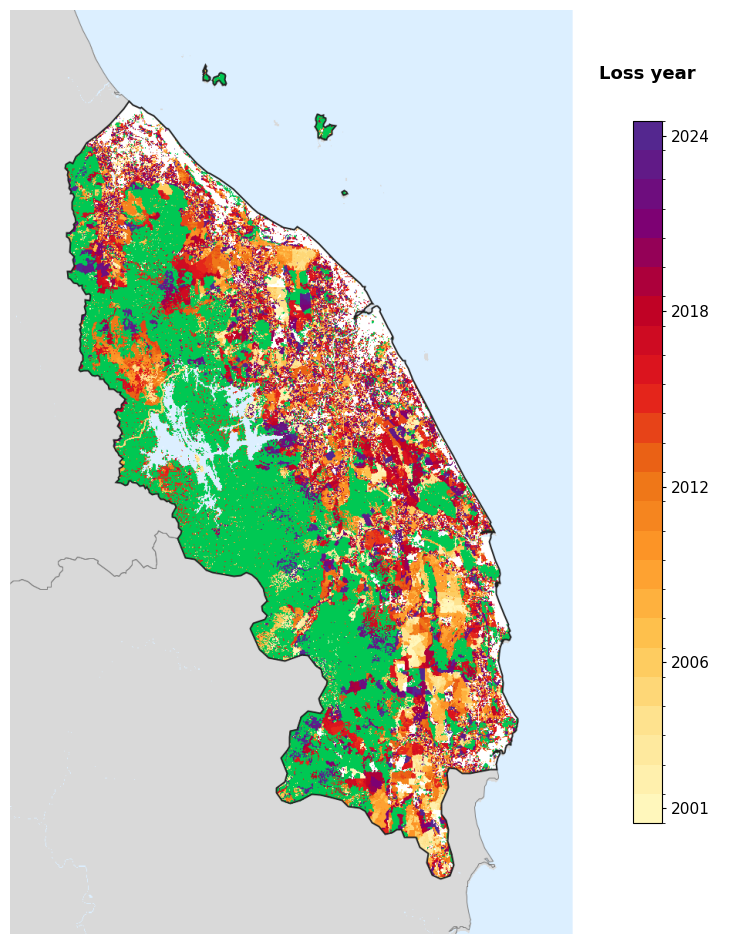
Tree-cover loss year in Terengganu, 2001-2024, from the Global Forest Change dataset

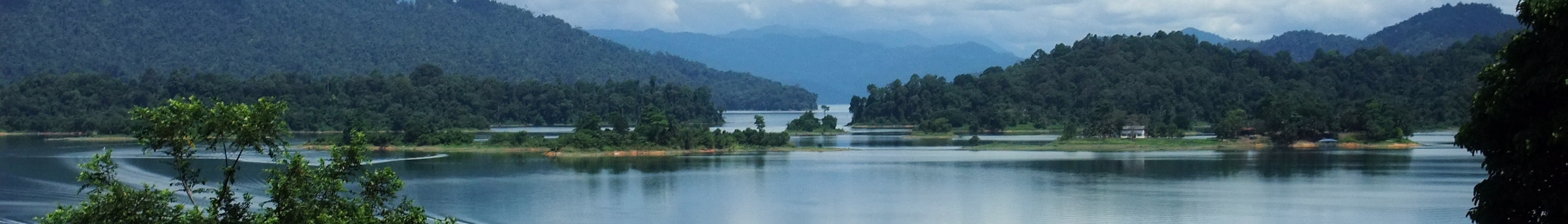
Lake Kenyir

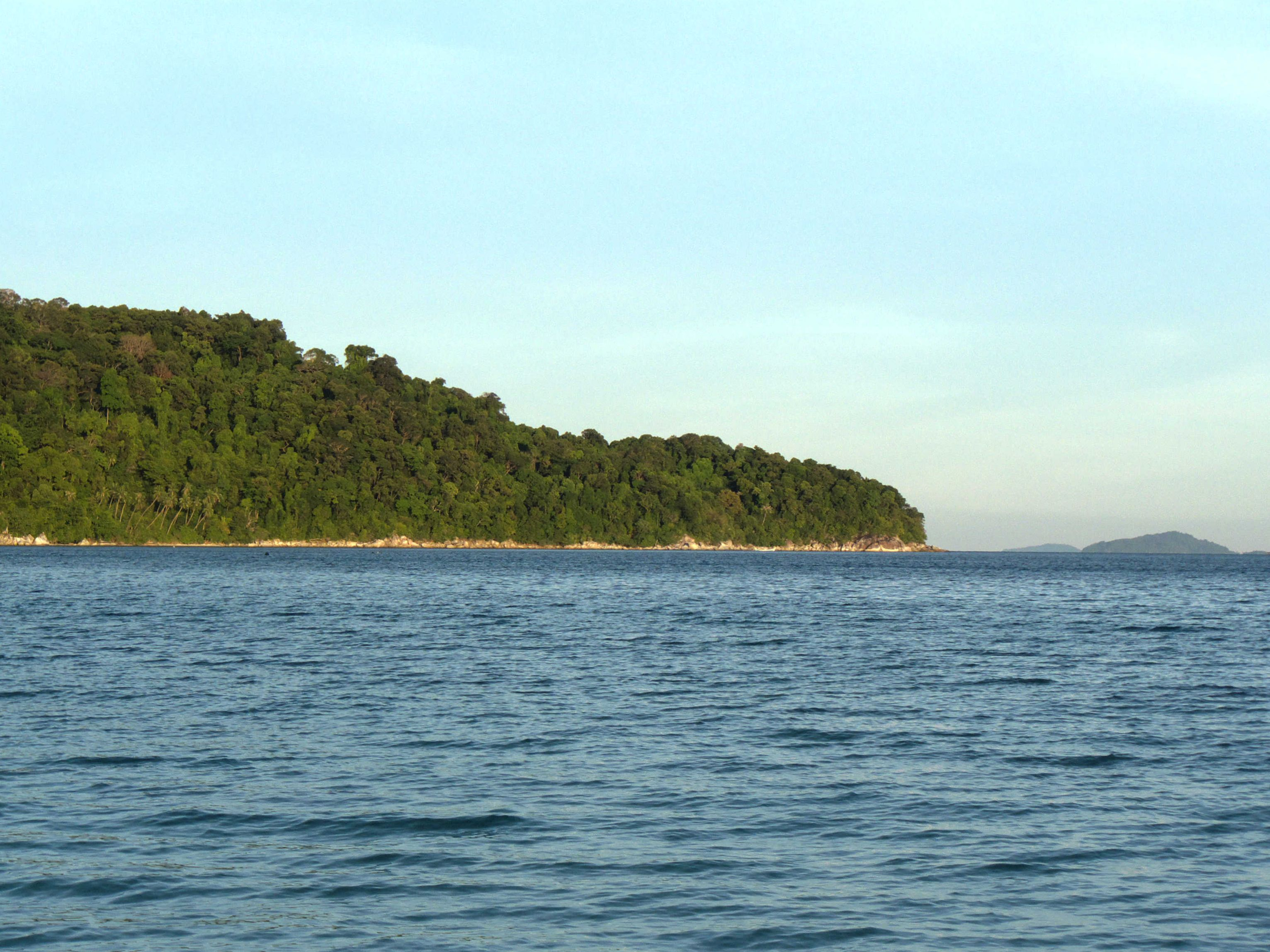
Perhentian Besar

Terengganu is situated in eastern Peninsular Malaysia, and is bordered to the northwest by Kelantan, to the southwest by Pahang, and to the east by the South China Sea. The state has a total area of 13,035 km^{2} (5,033 sq mi). Its topographical profile ranges from relatively level on the east coast and gradually becomes more hilly and mountainous towards the west, as its western borders are delineated by the Pantai Timur Range, with the highest point being Mount Lawit. The range acts as the main watershed for the state's riverine systems, as it is also home to Kenyir Lake, which is the source of the Terengganu River, is the largest man-made lake in Malaysia and serves as the state's major reservoir. Several outlying islands, including the Perhentians, Kapas and Redang, are also a part of the state.

== Politics and government ==
Affiliation	Coalition/Party Leader	Status	Seats	
Affiliation	Coalition/Party Leader	Status	2023 election	Current
Perikatan Nasional	Ahmad Samsuri Mokhtar	Government	32	32
Government majority			32	33

=== Constitution ===
The Constitution of Terengganu came into force in 1911. It has a supplement that came into force in 1959. The official English title for the 1911 constitution is "The Constitution of the Way of Illustrious Sovereignty". The 1959 constitutional supplement is divided into two sections. The sections' official English language titles are "The Laws of the Constitution of Terengganu (First Part)" and "The Laws of the Constitution of Terengganu (Second Part)"

=== The Sultan of Terengganu ===
The Sultan is the constitutional ruler of the state of Terengganu. The State Constitution proclaims that the Sultan is "the Ruler and fountain head of all authority of government in the State and Territory of Terengganu", the Head of the Religion of Islam in the state and the source of all titles, honours and dignities in the state. He is also vested with the Executive Power of the State. The hereditary Sultan of Terengganu since 1998 has been Sultan Mizan Zainal Abidin.

==== Regency ====
As per both the Malaysian and state constitutions, the Yang di-Pertuan Agong or King of Malaysia cannot simultaneously reign as federal Head of State and ruler of his own state. This means that a state ruler must appoint a regent to govern in his absence. Between 2006 and 2011, the current Sultan served as the 13th King of Malaysia, naming his eldest son and heir apparent, Tengku Muhammad Ismail, as Regent (Pemangku Raja) of Terengganu. As he was only eight years old upon his father's election, the young Prince co-reigned with a three-member Regency Advisory Council (Majlis Penasihat Pemangku Raja) headed by Raja Tengku Baderulzaman (the King's younger brother) as dictated by syarat (2) Fasal 16 AA Undang-Undang Bagi Diri Kerajaan Terengganu (Bab Yang Kedua) of the Terengganu State Constitution.

=== Chief Ministers ===
When Terengganu was an absolute monarchy, the Chief Minister was selected by the Sultan. Since the declaration of independence of Malaysia (then called Tanah Melayu) and the first general election, the Chief Minister has been the State Assembly (ADUN) member elected by a majority of all State Assembly members, who are themselves elected by universal adult suffrage of the citizens of their constituencies. Below is the list of the Chief Ministers of Terengganu from 1925.

Term starts	Term ends	Chief Minister	Party
April 1925	June 1940	Dato' Seri Amar Diraja Ngah Muhamad bin Yusof	
June 1940	May 1942	Tengku Seri Setia Raja Tengku Omar bin Othman	
May 1942	Dec 1945	Dato' Jaya Perkasa Da Omar bin Mahmud	
Dec 1945	Dec 1949	Tengku Panglima Perang Tengku Muhamad bin al-Marhum Sultan Ahmad	
Dec 1949	June 1959	Dato' Perdana Menteri Di Raja Dato' Seri Setia Raja Kamaruddin bin Idris	
June 1959	Nov 1961	Mohd Daud bin Abdul Samad	PAS*
Nov 1961	Sep 1970	Tan Sri Ibrahim Fikri bin Mohammad	Perikatan
Sep 1970	Sep 1971	Dato' Mahmood bin Sulaiman	Perikatan
Sep 1971	Aug 1974	Dato' Nik Hassan bin Wan Abdul Rahman	Perikatan
Sep 1974	Dec 1999	Dato' Seri Amar Diraja Tan Sri Wan Mokhtar Ahmad	Barisan Nasional
Dec 1999	March 2004	Dato' Seri Abdul Hadi Awang	PAS
March 2004	March 2008	Dato Seri Idris Jusoh	Barisan Nasional
March 2008	May 2014	Datuk Ahmad Said	Barisan Nasional
May 2014	May 2018	Dato' Seri Ahmad Razif Abd Rahman	Barisan Nasional
May 2018	Current	Dato' Seri Ahmad Samsuri Mokhtar	PAS
May 2018	Current	Dato' Seri Ahmad Samsuri Mokhtar	Perikatan Nasional

Note:* The state Government formed by PAS after the general election in 1959 was turned over to Perikatan in Nov 1961, due to a vote of no confidence in the State Assembly and the fact that two PAS assemblymen switched parties

==== 2008 Menteri Besar appointment crisis ====
Following the ruling party UMNO's return to power over Terengganu after winning 24 out of 32 seats in the 2008 general elections, Prime Minister (PM) Abdullah Ahmad Badawi put forth the reappointment of Datuk Seri Idris Jusoh to a second term as Menteri Besar. In what political analysts described as a possible constitutional crisis, trouble began to precipitate after the Sultan of Terengganu, Tuanku Mizan Zainal Abidin, who is also the then Yang di-Pertuan Agong (King) of Malaysia refused to re-appoint and swear in Idris as Menteri Besar. Similar problems occurred in the state of Perlis where the PM's choice was also rejected, in which the latter eventually gave in to its Sultan.

The Sultan of Terengganu appointed Ahmad Said instead for the job, with the Regency Advisory Council handing him the letter of appointment. The PM claimed that the appointment of Ahmad Said was unconstitutional as it went against the wishes of the assemblymen and the Prime Minister's office who have supported Idris Jusoh candidacy for Menteri Besar.

In spite of threats to strip Ahmad Said of his party membership "for disobeying the leadership", he went to the office in Wisma Darul Iman to begin the first day of his new appointment on 25 March 2008. The party announced earlier that they made good on their promise to remove his membership, which technically disqualifies him to be appointed as Menteri Besar in the first place. The ruling also planned to vote down the sultan's choice through a motion of no-confidence by 22 UMNO state assemblymen.

The opposition party Parti Islam SeMalaysia in the meantime promised that its assemblymen would support Ahmad Said as Menteri Besar.

On 26 March 2008 however, PM Abdullah Ahmad Badawi and Sultan Mizan Zainal Abidin met at Istana Negara to resolve the deadlock. The Prime Minister reversed his stance and decided to accept the King's appointment of Ahmad Said as Chief Minister of Terengganu. He also apologised to the King for the public spat over the appointment of the Menteri Besar, explaining that there was no intention to disparage or humiliate the royal household.

The apparent backdown was due to threat that the royal household would be prepared to dissolve the state assembly if the motion of no-confidence was initiated against Ahmad Said, which would trigger another election in what is already a climate of discontent towards the ruling party and the possibility of dissenting assemblymen defecting to the opposition.

The UMNO Supreme Council proceeded to endorse Ahmad Said as the new Menteri Besar of Terengganu. With the resolution of the impasse, Ahmad Said expressed his gratefulness on his appointment and paid tribute to Idris, an old friend he has known since university, for the work he has done for the Terengganu people so far and to seek his advice. After the swearing in ceremony where the duties are handed over from Idris, he also expressed hopes in moving on to discharge his responsibility to the people and eradicate poverty within the state.

=== Administrative divisions ===
Terengganu is divided into 8 districts (daerah), 99 mukims, and 7 local governments.

Administrative divisions of Terengganu
UPI code	Districts	Population (2020 census)	Population (mid 2023 estimate)	Area (km2)	Seat	Mukims
1101	Besut	154,168	162,600	1,233.678	Kampung Raja	19
1102	Dungun	158,130	165,200	2,735.031	Kuala Dungun	13
1103	Hulu Terengganu	69,881	73,700	3,874.626	Kuala Berang	10
1104	Kemaman	215,582	226,600	2,535.599	Chukai	17
1105	Kuala Terengganu	229,781	241,000	210.215	Kuala Terengganu	21
1106	Marang	116,605	124,000	666.543	Marang	8
1107	Setiu	59,651	62,900	1,304.363	Bandar Permaisuri	7
1108	Kuala Nerus	145,642	153,600	397.521	Kuala Nerus	4
Note: Most districts have a single local government, excepting Kuala Nerus and Kuala Terengganu, respectively under the jurisdiction of Kuala Terengganu City Council.

On 18 September 2014, it was announced that the Kuala Terengganu District sub-district of Kuala Nerus would become Terengganu's 8th district, to be called Kuala Nerus by sixth Prime Minister Datuk Seri Najib Razak.

=== Sharia Law ===
The state is ruled by Sharia Law which only applies to Muslims. In 2002, the state of Terengganu passed Syariah Criminal Offenses (Hudud And Qisas) Enactment 2002 which would allow canings, amputation of hands, stoning and crucifixion however this was unenforced due to the limit set in Act 355. In September 2018, two women were given six strokes of the cane for attempting to have same-sex relations.

== Demographics ==
Historical population
Year	Pop.	±%
1970	405,368	—
1980	525,255	+29.6%
1991	766,244	+45.9%
2000	880,234	+14.9%
2010	1,011,363	+14.9%
2020	1,149,440	+13.7%
2023	1,209,400	+5.2%

Terengganu has a population of 1,015,776 as of 2010, which increased to 1,149,440 in 2020. The official mid-year estimate in 2023 was 1,209,400. In 2006, Malays made up 94.7% of the population and Chinese, 2.6%, while Indians 0.2% and other ethnic groups comprise the remainder, 2.4%. According to the 2010 census, the ethnic composition of Terengganu was 97% Bumiputras, 2.6% Chinese, 0.2% Indian, and 0.1% others.

In 2000, the state's population was only 48.7% urban; the majority lived in rural areas. By the 2005 census, the proportions had changed significantly, with 51% of the population living in urban areas and 49% in the rural areas. Terengganu recorded the lowest life expectancy in Malaysia for both males and females for the period 2021-2023.

=== Ethnic groups ===
Terengganu is one of Malaysia's most homogeneous states along with Kelantan. More than 95% of the population is ethnically Malay, but there are other ethnic groups that live in the state as well, including Chinese (mostly Hokkien), Indians (mostly Tamils), Siamese, and Orang Aslis (Batek and Semaq Beri).

==== Malays ====
Malays are the largest ethnic group in the state with more than 94% of the population. The Malays in Terengganu are distinct from Malays of other parts of the country, they have unique cultures, traditions and spoken language. There are two sub-groups of Malays in the state:

Terengganu Malays

Terengganu Malays are the majority Malay sub-group in the state. They are the dominant Malay sub-group in all districts of Terengganu except for Besut and northern Setiu. They habitually speak Terengganu Malay language which is distinct but closely related to Kelantanese variety in the north. Terengganu Malays are also known for their rich cultures and traditions, one of the most well known is the Ulek Mayang.

Besut Malays

Besut Malays are predominantly found in the district of Besut and northern Setiu. Despite being Terengganu citizens, they are ethnically, linguistically, and culturally closer to, and still maintain strong ties with, Kelantan. Most Malays in Besut and northern Setiu speak only Kelantanese, although those who have long been exposed to other districts of Terengganu can speak Terengganuan as well.

==== Chinese ====
The Chinese Terengganuan form the largest minority ethnic group in the state. They are mostly Hokkien by ancestry and speak a dialect of Hokkien. Unlike other parts of Malaysia, the Chinese in Terengganu are much more assimilated; they speak fluent local Malay (Terengganuan in most parts of Terengganu and Kelantanese in Besut) and also share a similar lifestyle. They also have a local Peranakan culture known as "Mek Awang" which is a mixture of Chinese (mostly Hokkien) and Malay (Terengganu Malay) cultures, which can be seen in their cuisine and clothing and their language as well.

==== Indian ====
Indians in Terengganu are mostly Tamils and the majority are adherents of Hinduism, although a minority follow Islam. Like their Chinese counterparts, the Indian community in Terengganu are highly assimilated, with many fluent in Terengganu Malay along with Tamil, Standard Malay and English. There is one major Hindu temple in Kuala Terengganu. Most Indians in Terengganu live in urban areas like Kuala Terengganu.

==== Siamese ====
The Siamese in Terengganu maintain a small but well-organised community. They can be found in Besut and few in Setiu and Kuala Terengganu. Physically, there is little difference between Malays and Siamese other than their name and religion. Their native language is Southern Thai language but most speak Kelantanese as large numbers of them live in Besut.

==== Orang Asli ====
The Orang Aslis are the indigenous peoples of Peninsular Malaysia. In Terengganu they can be found mostly in Hulu Terengganu and Besut districts. There are two Orang Asli ethnic groups in Terengganu, the Semaq Beris live near Lake Kenyir or other parts of the district. They belong to Senoi group. Besides the Semaq Beris, there are also Batek people, a Semang ethnic group mostly found in interior parts of Terengganu, especially in Taman Negara area or in other parts of Terengganu. Both Semaq Beris and Bateks still maintain their semi-nomadic lifestyle, although some now live in permanent homes. Both are also speakers of Austroasiatic languages.

=== Languages ===
The people of Terengganu generally speak Coastal Terengganu Malay, which is distinct from standard Malay and Kelantan-Pattani Malay, except for those in Besut district, Perhentian Islands and some parts of Setiu where Kelantanese are more dominant. Those that live in Hulu Terengganu had their own distinct variant but closely related to Coastal Terengganu Malay. Chinese Terengganuans are predominantly Hoklo people and thus mostly speak Hokkien as their first language, although a number of Mandarin speakers are increasing. Indians in Terengganu mostly speak Malaysian Tamil. There is also an Orang Asli languages such as Batek and Semaq Beri, spoken in inland parts of Terengganu and is part of the Austroasiatic language family. There is also a small number of Cham language speakers spoken by a small community of Cham people in Dungun.

=== Religion ===
Religion in Terengganu - 2020 Census
religion	percent
Islam	97.3%
Buddhism	2%
Hinduism	0.2%
Christianity	0.2%
Others (including unknown/none, Chinese Folk Religions and Sikhism)	0.04%

According to the 2020 Census, the population of Terengganu is 97.3% Muslim, 2% Buddhist, 0.2% Hindu, 0.2% Christian, and 0.04% follower of Chinese folk religions or unknown affiliation.

Statistics from the 2010 Census indicate that 91.4% of the Chinese population are identified as Buddhists, with significant minorities of adherents identifying as Christians (4.7%), Chinese folk religions (1.6%) and Muslims (1.4%). The majority of the Indian population are Hindus (69.8%), with a significant minorities of numbers identifying as Muslims (18.1%), Christians (5.3%) and Buddhists (4.9%). The non-Malay bumiputera community are predominantly Muslims (56.8%), with significant minorities identifying as Christians (33.2%) and Buddhists (5.6%). All Malays are Muslims, in accordance with the Malaysian Constitution.

== Economy ==
Terengganu used to be Malaysia's poorest state until oil and gas were discovered off its coastline in the 80s. Terengganu's main industry now is petroleum and gas. There are huge petrochemical complexes near Paka and Kerteh, involving many joint ventures between the Malaysian national oil company, Petronas, and foreign multinationals. Tourism and fishing are also major industries in Terengganu, a state with a long coastline. Agriculture also remains important, with banana, rambutan, durian, watermelon, and various other fruits and vegetables available in season. Terengganu was traditionally famous for boatbuilding, with highly decorated carved wooden boats called bangau to be found in the harbour of every village and town in days not so long gone by, before electric motorboats became standard equipment for the state's fishermen.

Income and Quality of life	1995	2005
GDP (RM Million)	12,082.9	16,821.2
GDP Per Capita (RM)	13,636.1	13,642.6
Average Household Income (RM)	1,113.0	2,075.3
Crude Birth Rate (Per Thousand)	29.5	18.5
Infant Mortality Rate (Per Thousand)	10.4	6.5
Number of Population Per Doctor	2,803.0	1,930.0
Number of Students Per Teacher	17.6	15.1
Motor Vehicles Registered (Per Thousand)	181.0	212.5
Number of Viewers Per TV	11.4	9.0

== Culture and attractions ==
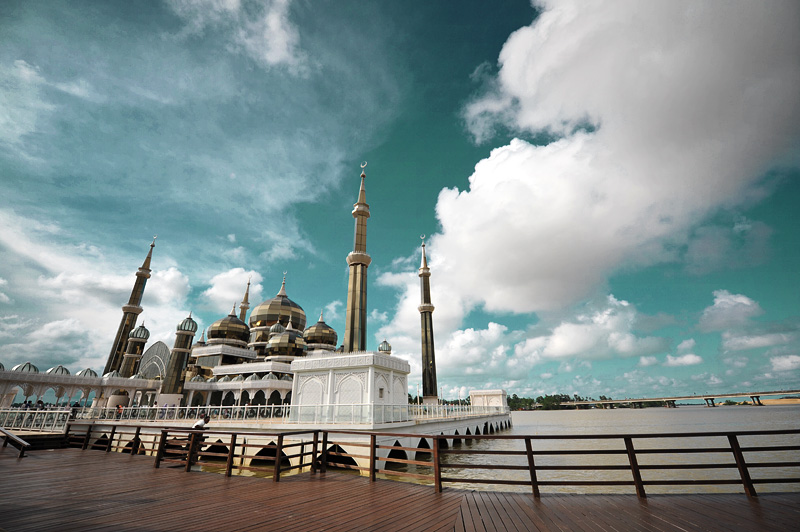
Crystal Mosque in Kuala Terengganu

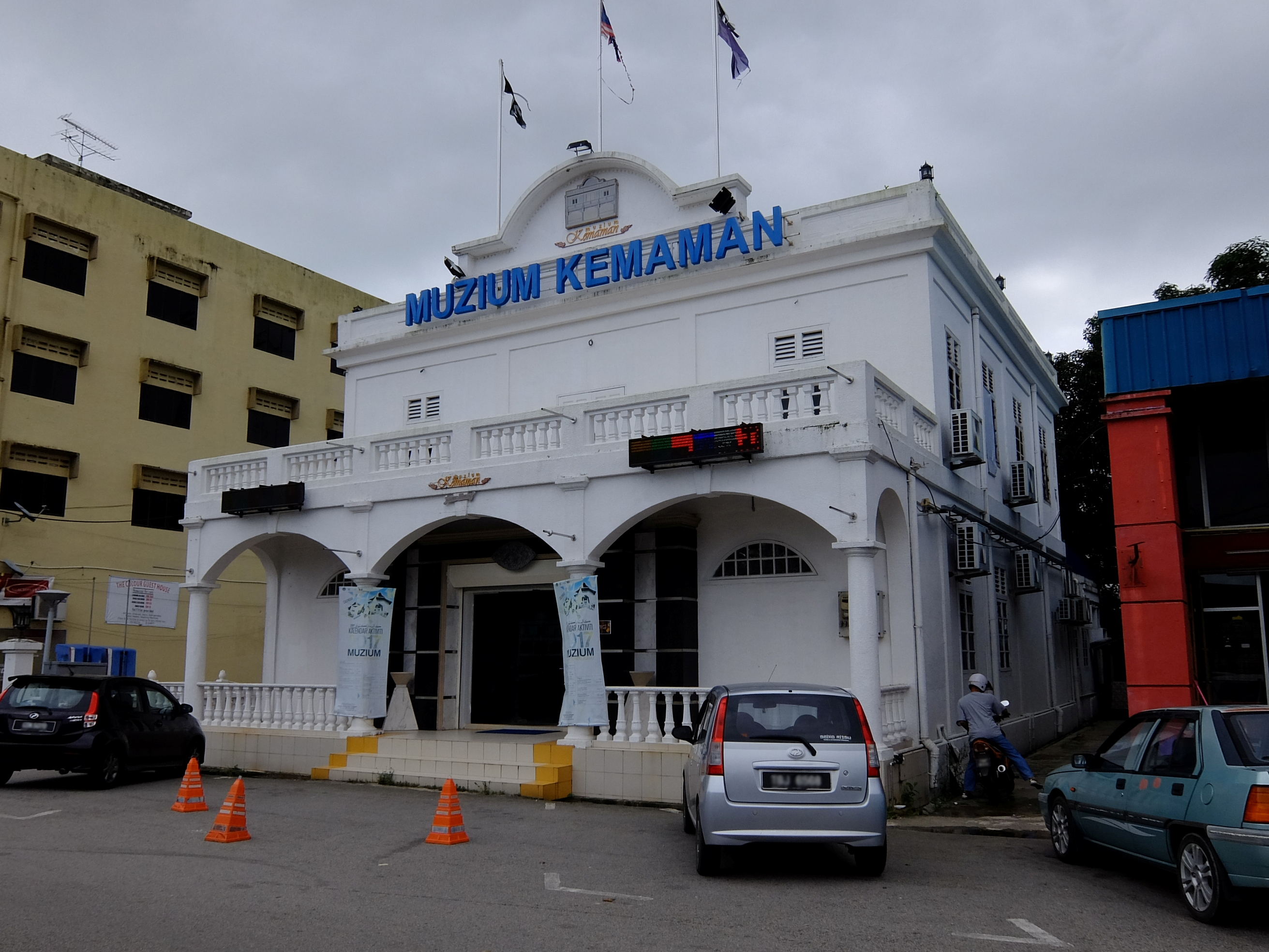
Kemaman Museum in Kemaman

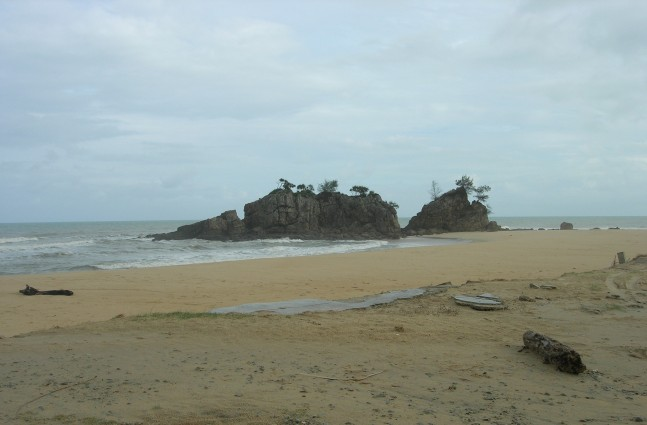
Kemasik Beach, in the town of Kemasik, Kemaman District

Terengganu did not receive many Indian or Chinese migrants, and therefore Malay cultural influences predominate. Traditional pursuits such as kite-flying contests, top-spinning contests, and traditional arts & crafts, such as batik and songket are still very much alive. The people of Terengganu have always had a reputation for being socially conservative and devout Muslims.

The major tourist attractions in the state include: Kuala Terengganu, the capital; Islamic Heritage Park, Tasik Kenyir, a large artificial lake; Sekayu Waterfalls; Kuala Ibai Lagoons; Batu Burok Beach, Kemasik Beach, Rantau Abang, Setiu Wetlands, Marang, Chukai town and several offshore islands such as Pulau Redang, Pulau Lang Tengah, and Pulau Kapas, and the Pulau Perhentian, which attract beachgoers and snorkelers because of their picture perfect beaches. Many travellers find the relatively rural and tranquil atmosphere in the state conducive to a relaxing holiday.

Terengganu has recently been known internationally as the host of Monsoon Cup, which was first held in 2005 and then became an annual national sporting event. The event brought millions of ringgit of investment into the state from the private sectors and Malaysian Government. Tourists flocked to Kuala Terengganu and Duyong to witness this event, held during the monsoon season, which had previously been low season for tourism in Terengganu.

Basic Tourism Sector Data	1999	2005
Average Day of Stays of Foreign Tourist	3.3	4.2
Average Day of Stays of Domestic Tourist	1.9	3.1
Sectorial Contribution to the Economy (RM Million)	298.9	1281.0
Number of Registered Tourist Agents	70	92
Number of Tourist Guides	21	37
Average Hotel Occupancy Rate (%)	55.9	58.3
Domestic Tourist	1,002,324	1,624,726
Foreign Tourist	146,713	197,952
Total Tourist Arrival	1,149,037	1,822,678

=== Culture ===
Terengganu, along with Kelantan, is known as the cradle of the Malay civilization in Peninsular Malaysia. There are various traditional dances in the state such as the Ulek Mayang, Rodat, Saba, Balai, and Nur Sakti; some even predate the arrival of Islam in the region. Terengganu is also one of few states to adopt the gamelan as part of their traditional theatre (after Riau and Pahang); the Terengganu gamelan has developed a distinct identity from Sundanese and Javanese gamelan. The gamelan was originally brought to Pahang and later to Terengganu, and was played only during royal occasions. Today the gamelan is part of the state's cultural heritage.

=== Events ===
- 2008 National Horse Show at Terengganu Equestrian Resort 31 October to 2 November
- Monsoon Cup- international sailing event
- Sultan's Cup Terengganu Endurance Challenge - Horse Endurance Race
- Formula Future- speed boat racing for under 15
- Kapas-Marang International Swimathon- International swimming event
- Kenyir Motocross Championship
- Terengganu Masters- Golf
- Kenyir International Mountain Bike Challenge
- 'Candat Sotong' Fiesta - fishing competition
- Kenyir Lake International Triathlon
- Terengganu Starhill Tasik Kenyir 4x4 Challenge
- Tasik Puteri Water Festival
- Terengganu Traditional Games Competition
- Terengganu International 4WD Rainforest Challenge 2007
- FEI World Endurance Championship 2008
- Le Tour de Langkawi 2012
- Terengganu International Squid Jigging Festival

== Cuisine ==
The most famous local food is Keropok Lekor, which is made primarily from a combination of dough (sago flour) and pounded fish mainly from mackerel and sardines, fried and served with hot chilli sauce for afternoon tea. Keropok Keping (fish crackers) are made from sun-dried slices of Keropok Lekor. Numerous keropok stalls are to be found on the side of the highway that passes through coastal communities. Keropok lekor is best eaten with local chili sauce, made from dried chili, tamarind, sugar and vinegar.

Budu, a very pungent and salty anchovy sauce is also popular among the locals. It is often mixed with sliced onions and chillies as condiments. Budu made from ikan bilis fermented with salt. There are other version of budu, known as Pelara were made by using mackerel were popular among the older generation, can be found in traditional market sold in bottles.

Laksam (or laksang in Terengganu Malay), a modified version of laksa, is made from rice flour (thick and soft slices). It is served in a bowl of light fresh coconut milk mixed with boiled fish flesh (mainly mackerel), finely chopped cucumbers, chillies, onions and long beans. It is eaten cold at breakfast.

Another Terengganu speciality is sata, a type of otak-otak or fish cake wrapped in banana leaves and cooked over a grill. Sata made from combination of fish and grated coconut, with some portion of spice.

Nasi dagang is also popular.

The state is also known for dedicated restaurants serving battered fresh seafood (in Malay: celup tepung, lit. 'flour-dipped') lining its beaches.

== Education ==
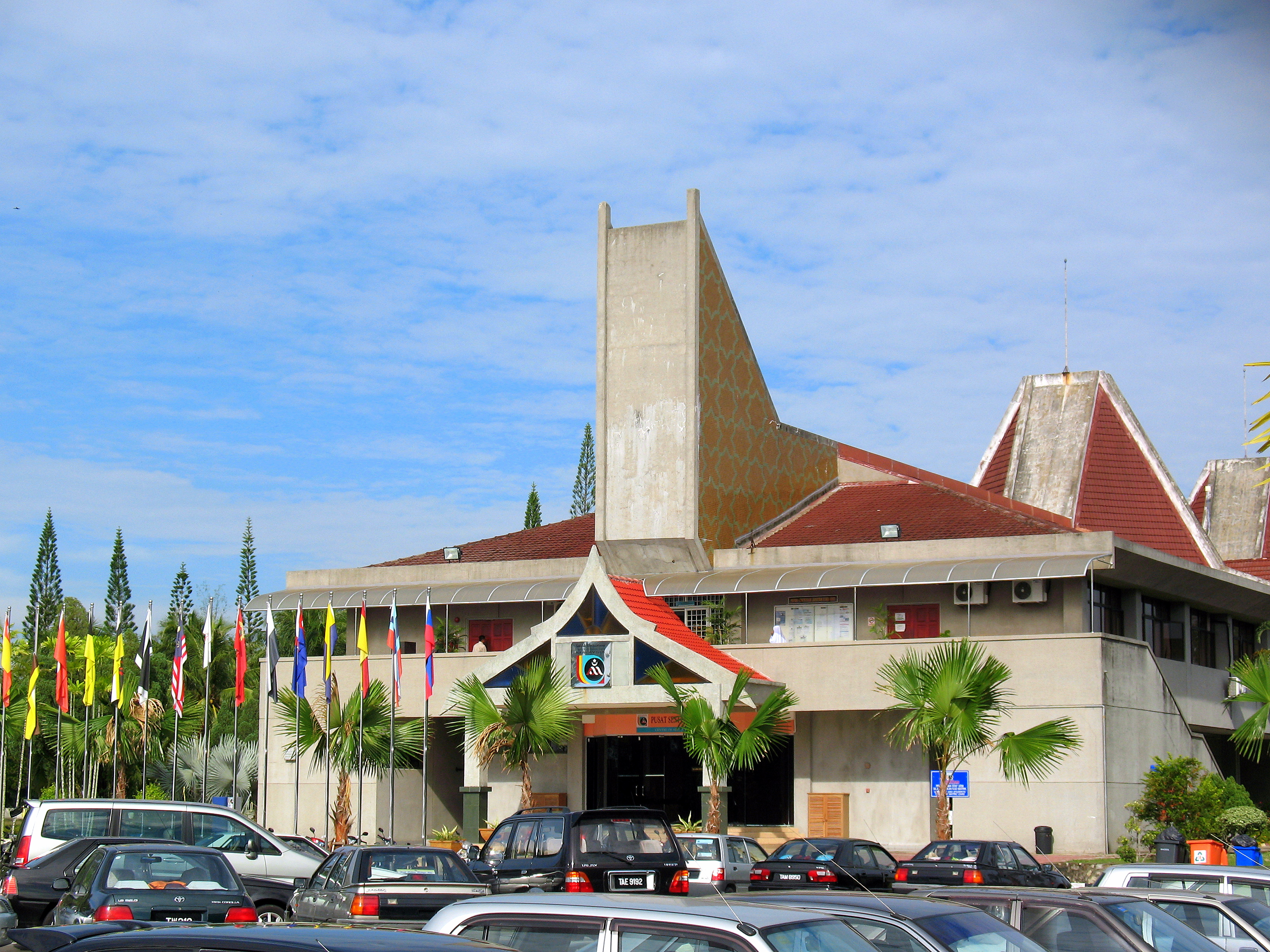
Universiti Sultan Zainal Abidin

There are several institutes of higher learning in Terengganu. They are either categorised as Institut Pengajian Tinggi Awam (IPTA); public university or Institut Pengajian Tinggi Swasta (IPTS); private university. Among public universities which have campus in Terengganu is the Universiti Sultan Zainal Abidin and Universiti Malaysia Terengganu. Both universities have campus in Gong Badak, in north Kuala Terengganu.

Beside that, Terengganu also had 3 Universiti Teknologi MARA branches, in Kuala Terengganu, Dungun and Bukit Besi. Also, Terengganu host several private university and college, such as TATI University College in Kemaman, UCSI Terengganu campus in Marang, Institut Teknologi Petroleum PETRONAS (INSTEP) in Batu Rakit, Kuala Terengganu and Kolej Teknologi Bestari in Setiu, Politechnics Sultan Zainal Abidin, among others.

List of Tertiary Institutes (public and private)

- Politeknik Kuala Terengganu
- Universiti Sultan Zainal Abidin
- Universiti Malaysia Terengganu
- Universiti Teknologi MARA (3 branches)
- Institut Teknologi Petroleum PETRONAS (INSTEP)
- Politeknik Sultan Mizan Zainal Abidin
- Kolej PTPL
- Kolej Kemahiran Tinggi Mara (KKTM) Kemaman
- Kolej Teknologi & Inovasi KRIM
- Institut Teknologi Petronas
- Kolej Seri Iman
- Kolej Ketengah
- RANACO Education and Training Institute (RETI)
- Kolej Teras Timur
- Kolej Islam Sains Teknologi (KIST)
- TATI University College(TATIUC)
- MARA KETENGAH International College (MKIC)

Secondary school (high school) education is provided by Sekolah Kebangsaan (National School, i.e.: Sekolah menengah Kebangsaan Sultan Sulaiman, Sekolah Menengah Kebangsaan Balai besar, SMK Sura), Sekolah Jenis Kebangsaan (National-type School) Chinese primary schools, and Sekolah Ugama (Religious schools, e.g.: SMA Sultan Zainal Abidin Ladang). All of them follow the syllabus and curriculum provided and regulated by the Malaysian Ministry of Education (Kementerian Pendidikan Malaysia). Every year the state government spends RM34 million to develop education in Terengganu. Part of these grants ensures that every eligible primary school student in Terengganu is able to get a Netbook worth RM1000 to help in their studies.

== Transportation ==
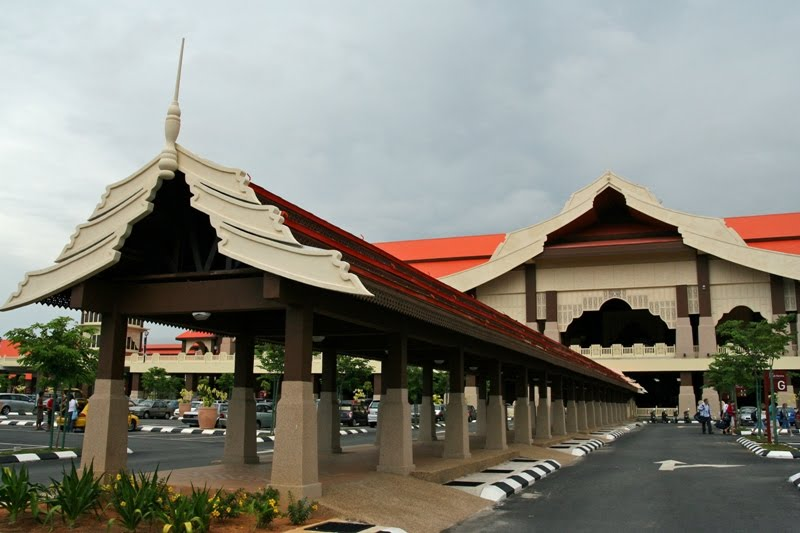
Sultan Mahmud Airport

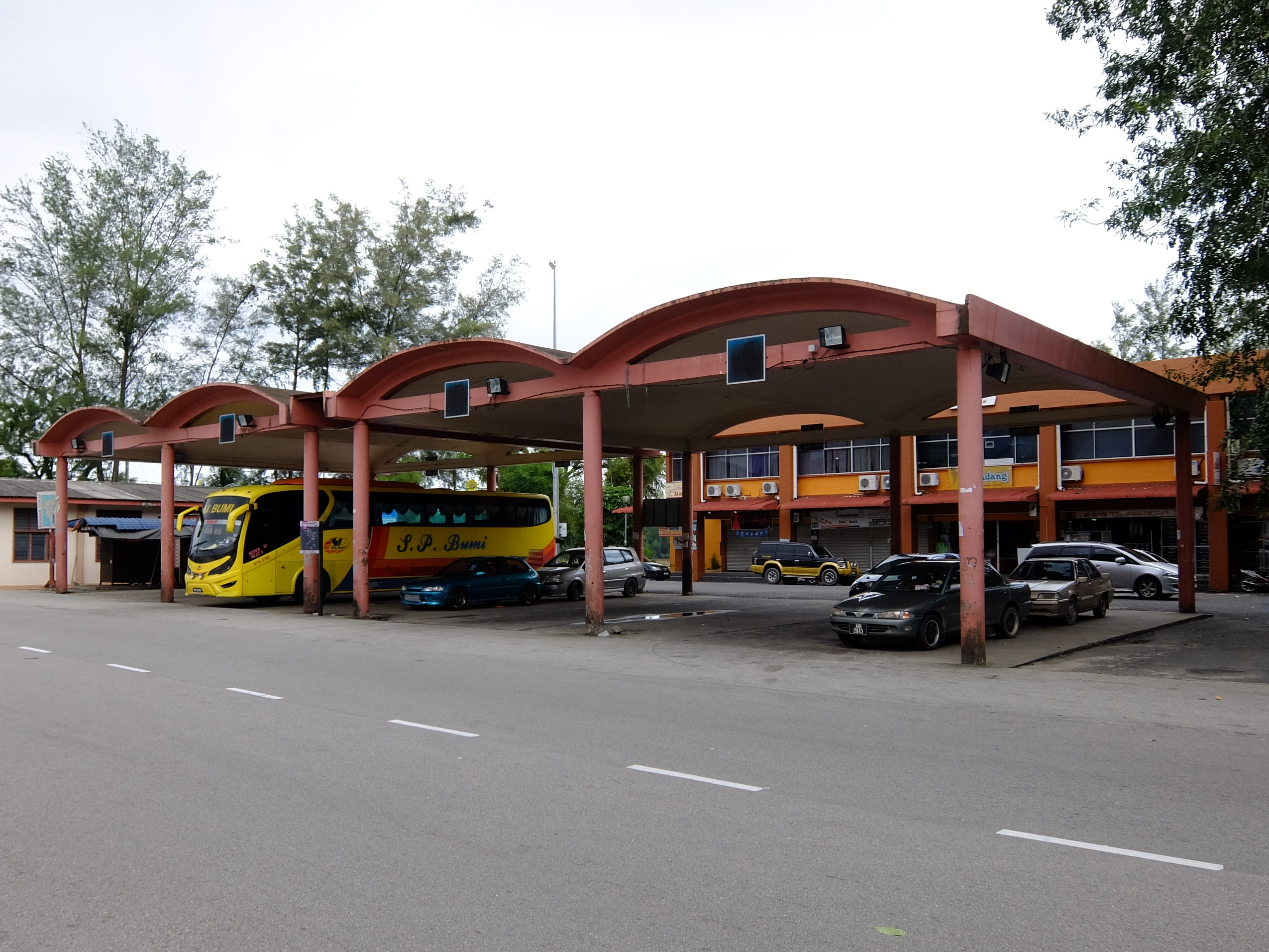
Bus station in Kemaman

=== Air ===
There are three airports located in Terengganu, of which two of them are open to the public. Sultan Mahmud Airport located in Gong Badak, Kuala Nerus is the state's main airport and serves as a main gateway by air to and from Terengganu. Other public airport is the Redang Airport, located in Redang Island off the coast of Terengganu.

Kerteh Airport, located in the town of Kerteh, Kemaman is the state's second largest airport but is not open to public because the airport is owned and operated by Petroliam Nasional Berhad or Petronas via its East Coast Regional Office (ECRO), and was built to serve the purpose of airlifting its employees and ExxonMobil employees to their various oil platforms located 100–200 km offshore South China Sea. The airport although small, has a single 1,362 m (4,469 ft) long runway which can accommodate a Boeing 737-400 aircraft.

A military air force base, RMAF Gong Kedak is located between the borders of Kelantan (Pasir Puteh) and Terengganu (Besut) and has an airstrip which crosses the two state borders.

== See also ==
- Proclamation of Malaysia

== In popular culture ==
=== Movies ===
- Tukang Perahu Pulau Duyong (2013)
