= Flag and coat of arms of Terengganu =

Symbols of the Malaysian state

The flag and the coat of arms of Terengganu are state symbols of Terengganu, a state in Malaysia. Like the majority of state symbols for states with Malay royalties, the flag and the arms of Terengganu centre on its royalty, as well as Islam, the state's traditional religion.

== Flag ==
=== Design ===
Terengganu
- Use: Civil and state flag
- Proportion: 1:2
- Adopted: 1953
- Design: Black flag with a white border charged with white star and crescent in the centre.

First revealed in 1953, the present flag of Terengganu encompasses a black flag with a thick, white border and a white star and crescent in the centre that points towards the fly. The width of the crescent is five-sixths the width of the black panel, while the width of the star, which is tilting clockwise, is two-thirds that of the crescent.

The white signifies the Sultan of Terengganu, while the black signifies the state's citizens; with the white border surrounding the black panel, the layout represents the Sultan's duty to protect his subjects. The star and crescent denote Islam as the official religion of the state.

In October 2006, then-Menteri Besar of Terengganu Idris Jusoh voiced intentions by the state government to "[brighten] up" the flag and incorporate an emblem by first seeking opinions from professions, citing feedback of the flag being too "simple and dull". As of 2008, there have been no reports of further action.

=== Variants ===
==== District flags ====
Terengganu has eight administrative districts (daerah), each assigned their own district-level flags. All eight of the flags consist of only a single coloured field with the state flag on the canton; the only distinction is the colour of the field, which corresponds to respectable districts and represents their qualities:

District	Flag	Field colour	Symbolisation
Besut		Red	Besut's development of land and power-generating infrastructures.
Dungun		Cyan	Dungun's fishing industry and tourism due to the presence of Penyu Belimbing, a species of sea turtles, at its beaches.
Hulu Terengganu		Orange	Hulu Terengganu's courage and willingness to work hard.
Kemaman		Blue	Kemaman's strength in the development of petroleum and natural gas-related industries.
Kuala Terengganu		Yellow	Kuala Terengganu as the capital district of Terengganu, as its state capital and the royal state capital are both situated in the district.
Marang		Purple	Marang's responsibility in restoring of unity among its people.
Setiu		Brown	Setiu's distribution of power by its people for the development of towns and cities.
Kuala Nerus		Pink	Kuala Nerus' knowledge-supported and balanced development for the prosperity of the people.

==== Royal Standards ====
Terengganu's royalty, mostly prominently the Sultan of Terengganu, fly their own Royal Standards.

The Sultan's Royal Standard is known as Tanah Putih and consists of a white flag bearing a partial rendition of the state emblem, as well as a wreath of rice stalks and a motto. Previously a plain white flag, the additional emblem, which is coloured yellow, was added to identify the flag to Terengganu's royal family.

The design of the Pemaisuri's (Queen's) Royal Standard (which is given the name Tanah Kuning Tua) is very similar to that of the Sultan's, but features a reversed arrangement of colours, with a white emblem against a yellow field. The Royal Standard of the Yang Di-pertuan Muda (Crown Prince) bears a similar colour configuration as the Queen's, but features only the partial rendition of the state emblem, which is significantly larger than that of the Sultan's and the Queen's. The Royal Standard for the Crown Prince is named as Tanah Kuning Muda.

==== Obsolete flags ====
Prior to the adoption of the present flag, the state flag of Terengganu previously sported a significantly different design, although many of its elements would be carried over to its successor. The earliest known variant of the state flag was used between 1925 and 1933, and consisted of only a white-black flag divided vertically with the black stripe two times wider than the white stripe.

Flag used until 1933.

In 1933, a star and crescent that pointed upwards and featured rounder crescent was added on the black band, signifying Terengganu's recognition of Islam as the state's religion. The flag remained in use until the introduction of the current flag.

Flag used until 1953.

Additionally, the state government of Terengganu formerly flew its own "Governmental Service Flag", which design originated in the same manner as the state flag. Bearing the same vertical white-black layout, a white saltire was also included on the black stripe. Similarly, a star and crescent was also added in a later date, but was placed on the white stripe. The flag was rendered obsolete following the adoption of the present state flag, which was also to be used by the state government.

== State emblem ==
=== Design ===
State emblem of Terengganu
- Armiger: Terengganu
- Motto: "Terengganu" written in Jawi (ترڠڬانو)

Approved for official use by the State Ministers Committee in 1932, the state arms or emblem (Malay: Jata) of Terengganu was designed by several state officials during the reign of Sultan Zainal Abidin III (1881–1918), and is thought to have been drawn by Mohamad bin Abdul Rahim, the relative of Dato' Nara Wangsa (Dato' Mata-Mata).

The arms originally consisted of a white outlined oval that encompassed a series of symbols coloured in yellow and a Jawi motto. During the rule of Sultan Ismail Nasiruddin Shah (1945–1979), the emblem was modified with the addition of a dotted figure of a seal around all of the symbols except the star and crescent, which resides over the seal, the addition of a pair of maces and the shortening of the motto.

Details of the emblem's components are as follows:

Star and crescent
The star and crescent reside atop the seal, pointing upwards. As a symbol of the Islamic faith, they represent Terengganu as an Islamic state.

Seal
The seal consists of a near-oval, shield-like dotted outline that encompasses virtually all symbols in the emblem with the exception of the star and crescent, including:
- A crown, located near the top, which represents the sovereignty of the Sultan of Terengganu;
- a sword, a long kris and a pair of ceremonial maces (The sword and kris crisscrosses each other to the top, while the maces crisscrosses each other lower down), which symbolise the royal paraphernalia of Terengganu;
- two books, located on opposing sides of the seal below the upper half of a mace and the lower half of the sword or kris, represent two important books in Terengganu: The Book of Law—placed on the left—denoting justice and the Qur'an—placed on the right—denoting the Law; and
- a scarf (wali or selampai), which wraps around the sword or kris and over the maces, signify a portion of the state's cultural regalia.

Motto

The motto, "Terengganu" written in Jawi (ترڠڬانو), is located below the seal. When introduced in 1932, the emblem's motto originally read "Jawatan Kerajaan Terengganu" (Terengganu Government Post) in Jawi (جاوتن کراجا^{ء}ن ترڠݢانو). During the rule of Sultan Ismail Nasiruddin Shah, "Jawatan Kerajaan" was omitted from the motto, resulting in its present form.

=== Royal Standard variants ===
The state emblem of Terengganu is included on the Royal Standards of Terengganu's royal family, but differs slightly, as it is only duplicated partially, without the outlining oval border and seal, the "Terengganu" motto and the star and crescent. Two elements are added on the emblem in the case of the Royal Standards for the Sultan and the Queen: a wreath of rice stalks and a different motto depicted in the form of banner to be written in Jawi. The motto corresponds to the individual the Standard is assigned to; as such, the motto for the Standard of the Sultan reads "Sultan Terengganu" while that of the Queen reads "Pemaisuri Terengganu". The emblem on the Royal Standard of the Crown Prince consists of only the partial replication of the state emblem.

As the Standard of the Sultan has a white field, the emblem retains its yellow colour. However, as the Standard of the Queen and the Crown Prince bare yellow fields, their emblems are white.
