= Besut (federal constituency) =

Malaysian federal constituency

Besut (P033)
Terengganu constituency

Federal constituency
- Legislature: Dewan Rakyat
- MP: Che Mohamad Zulkifly Jusoh; PN
- Constituency created: 1958
- First contested: 1959
- Last contested: 2022

Demographics
- Population (2020): 127,825
- Electors (2023): 112,718
- Area (km²): 1,027
- Pop. density (per km²): 124.5

Besut is a federal constituency in Besut District, Terengganu, Malaysia, that has been represented in the Dewan Rakyat since 1959.

The federal constituency was created in the 1958 redistribution and is mandated to return a single member to the Dewan Rakyat under the first past the post voting system.

== Demographics ==
Ethnic breakdown of Besut's electorate as of 2022
1. Malay (99.9%)
2. Chinese (0.10%)
3. Other ethnicities (0.00%)
4. Indian (0.00%)
Age breakdown of Besut's electorate as of 2022
1. 18-20 (7.44%)
2. 21-29 (25.1%)
3. 30-39 (25.7%)
4. 40-49 (16.9%)
5. 50-59 (12.2%)
6. 60-69 (8.01%)
7. 70-79 (3.61%)
8. 80-89 (0.92%)
9. above 90 (0.17%)
Gender breakdown of Besut's electorate as of 2022
1. Male (49.9%)
2. Female (50.1%)

== History ==
=== Polling districts ===
According to the federal gazette issued on 18 July 2023, the Besut constituency is divided into 43 polling districts.

State constituency	Polling district	Code	Location
Kuala Besut (N01)	Pulau Perhentian	033/01/01	SK Pulau Perhentian
Kuala Besut (N01)	Seberang Berat	033/01/02	SK Kuala Besut
Kuala Besut (N01)	Nail	033/01/03	SK Kampung Nail
Kuala Besut (N01)	Seberang Barat Luar	033/01/04	SMK Kuala Besut
Kuala Besut (N01)	Tok Saboh	033/01/05	SK Alor Peroi
Kuala Besut (N01)	Kampung Nangka	033/01/06	SK Kampung Nangka
Kuala Besut (N01)	Kampung Baru	033/01/07	SMK Seri Bukit Puteri
Kuala Besut (N01)	Bukit Puteri	033/01/08	SK Bukit Puteri
Kuala Besut (N01)	Air Terjun	033/01/09	SK Ayer Terjun
Kota Putera (N02)	Pekan Seberang Kastam	033/02/01	SK Pengkalan Nyireh
Kota Putera (N02)	Pengkalan Nyireh	033/02/02	SMK Permaisuri Nur Zahirah
Kota Putera (N02)	Kampung Raja Utara	033/02/03	SMK Kampong Raja
Kota Putera (N02)	Kampung Raja Selatan	033/02/04	SMA Maarif
Kota Putera (N02)	Keluang	033/02/05	SK Keluang
Kota Putera (N02)	Batu Tumbuh	033/02/06	SK Tengku Mahmud
Kota Putera (N02)	Amir	033/02/07	SK Amer
Kota Putera (N02)	Gong Bayur	033/02/08	SK Tengku Mahmud 2
Kota Putera (N02)	Tembila	033/02/09	SK Tembila
Kota Putera (N02)	Beting Lintang	033/02/10	SK Beting Linang
Kota Putera (N02)	Alur Lintang	033/02/11	SMK Nasiruddin Shah
Kota Putera (N02)	Gelam Mas	033/02/12	Kolej Vokesional Besut
Jertih (N03)	Kubang Bemban	033/03/01	Balai Raya Kg. Tok Donik
Jertih (N03)	Alur Lintah	033/03/02	SK Alor Lintah
Jertih (N03)	Tok Raja	033/03/03	SK Tok Raja
Jertih (N03)	Bukit Kenak	033/03/04	SK Bukit Kenak
Jertih (N03)	Gong Nering	033/03/05	SMK Seri Nering
Jertih (N03)	Simpang Tiga Jertih	033/03/06	SK Pusat Jerteh
Jertih (N03)	Bandar Jertih	033/03/07	SJK (C) Chung Hwa
Jertih (N03)	Seberang Jertih	033/03/08	SK Seberang Jerteh
Jertih (N03)	Padang Luas	033/03/09	SK Padang Luas
Jertih (N03)	Padang Landak	033/03/10	SK Padang Landak
Jertih (N03)	Nyiur Tujuh	033/03/11	SK Nyiur Tujuh
Jertih (N03)	Gong Gucil	033/03/12	SK Tanah Merah
Jertih (N03)	Pelagat	033/03/13	SMK Pelagat
Hulu Besut (N04)	Cerang Meliling	036/04/01	SK Lubuk Kawah
Hulu Besut (N04)	Lubok Kawah	033/04/02	SMA Wataniah
Hulu Besut (N04)	Alur Keladi	033/04/03	SK Alor Keladi
Hulu Besut (N04)	Darau	033/04/04	SK Darau
Hulu Besut (N04)	Pasir Akar	033/04/05	SK Pasir Akar
Hulu Besut (N04)	Padang Bual	033/04/06	Devan Sivik Pasir Akar
Hulu Besut (N04)	Bukit Payung	033/04/07	SK Seri Payong
Hulu Besut (N04)	FELDA Tenang	033/04/08	SK (FELDA) Tenang
Hulu Besut (N04)	Kampung La	033/04/09	SK Kampung La
Hulu Besut (N04)	Hulu Besut	033/04/10	SK Keruak
Hulu Besut (N04)	Kayu Kelat	033/04/11	SK Tanah Merah

=== Representation history ===
Members of Parliament for Besut
Parliament	No	Years	Member	Party	Vote Share
Constituency created from Terengganu Utara
Parliament of the Federation of Malaya
1st	P025	1959–1963	Burhanuddin al-Helmy (برهان الدين محمد نور الحلمي)	PMIP	9,988 70.32%
Parliament of Malaysia
1st	P025	1963–1964	Burhanuddin al-Helmy (برهان الدين محمد نور الحلمي)	PMIP	9,988; 70.32%
2nd	P025	1964–1969	Mohd. Daud Abdul Samad (محمد. داود عبدالصمد)	PMIP	10,995; 50.31%
		1969–1971	Parliament was suspended		
3rd	P025	1971–1973	Hussain Sulaiman (حسين سليمان)	Alliance (UMNO)	13,830; 51.92%
3rd	P025	1973–1974	Hussain Sulaiman (حسين سليمان)	BN (UMNO)	13,830; 51.92%
4th	P028	1974–1978	Zakaria Abdul Rahman (زكريا عبدالرحمٰن)	BN (UMNO)	Uncontested
5th	P028	1978–1982	Zakaria Abdul Rahman (زكريا عبدالرحمٰن)	BN (UMNO)	12,949; 55.71%
6th	P028	1982–1986	Zakaria Abdul Rahman (زكريا عبدالرحمٰن)	BN (UMNO)	16,753; 56.78%
7th	P030	1986–1990	Zakaria Abdul Rahman (زكريا عبدالرحمٰن)	BN (UMNO)	15,240; 59.70%
8th	P030	1990–1995	Mohamed Yusof Mohamed Noor (محمد يوسف محمد نور)	BN (UMNO)	16,148; 51.59%
9th	P033	1995–1999	Idris Jusoh (إدريس جوسوه)	BN (UMNO)	19,294; 56.61%
10th	P033	1999–2004	Hassan Mohamed (حسّان محمد)	BA (PAS)	19,166; 54.06%
11th	P033	2004–2008	Abdullah Md Zin (عبدﷲ مد زين)	BN (UMNO)	26,087; 59.73%
12th	P033	2008–2013	Abdullah Md Zin (عبدﷲ مد زين)	BN (UMNO)	29,376; 60.99%
13th	P033	2013–2018	Idris Jusoh (إدريس جوسوه)	BN (UMNO)	35,232; 56.71%
14th	P033	2018–2022	Idris Jusoh (إدريس جوسوه)	BN (UMNO)	34,335; 48.40%
15th	P033	2022–present	Che Mohamad Zulkifly Jusoh (چئ محمد ذوالكفل جوسوه)	PN (PAS)	49,569; 59.85%

=== State constituency ===
Parliamentary constituency	State constituency						
Parliamentary constituency	1954–1959*	1959–1974	1974–1986	1986–1995	1995–2004	2004–2018	2018–present
Besut		Besut Tengah					
Besut			Bukit Kenak				
Besut				Hulu Besut			
Besut				Jertih			
Besut		Kampong Raja					
Besut				Kampung Raja			
Besut						Kota Putera	
Besut		Kuala Besut					
Besut		Setiu					
Besut		Ulu Besut					

=== Historical boundaries ===
State Constituency	Area					
State Constituency	1959	1974	1984	1994	2003	2018
Besut Tengah	Bukit Kenak; FELDA Selasih; Jabi; Kampung Anak Musang; Kampung Gong Nangka					
Bukit Kenak		Bukit Kenak; FELDA Selasih; Jabi; Kampung Anak Musang; Kampung Gong Nangka				
Hulu Besut	Bukit Payong; FELDA Tenang; Kampung Cerang Meliling; Kampung Chegar Batang; Kampung Keruak					
Jertih			Jertih; Kampung Alor Lintah; Kampung Mak Sara; Kampung Padang; Tok Raja			
Kampong Raja	Kampung Gong Kepas; Kampung Kubang Ikan; Kampung Paya Rawa; Kampung Raja; Tembila	Kampung Lampu; Kampung Limbongan; Kampung Raja; Kuala Besut; Tembila	Alur Lintang; Beting Linang; Kampung Raja; Kota Putera; Tembila			
Kota Putera					Alur Lintang; Beting Linang; Kampung Raja; Kota Putera; Tembila	
Kuala Besut	Ayer Terjun; Bukit Puteri; Kampung Nangka; Kuala Besut; Pulau Perhentian					
Setiu	Kampung Beris Tok Ku; Kampung Bintang; Kampung Saujana; Permaisuri; Setiu					

=== Current state assembly members ===
No.	State Constituency	Member	Coalition (Party)
N01	Kuala Besut	Azbi Salleh	PN (PAS)
N02	Kota Putera	Mohd. Nurkhuzaini Ab. Rahman	PN (PAS)
N03	Jertih	Riduan Mohamad Nor	PN (PAS)
N04	Hulu Besut	Mohd Husaimi Hussin	PN (BERSATU)

=== Local governments & postcodes ===
No.	State Constituency	Local Government	Postcode
N01	Kuala Besut	Besut District Council	22000, 22010, 22020 Jerteh; 22200 Besut; 22300 Kuala Besut
N02	Kota Putera	Besut District Council	22000, 22010, 22020 Jerteh; 22200 Besut; 22300 Kuala Besut
N03	Jertih	Besut District Council	22000, 22010, 22020 Jerteh; 22200 Besut; 22300 Kuala Besut
N04	Hulu Besut	Besut District Council	22000, 22010, 22020 Jerteh; 22200 Besut; 22300 Kuala Besut

== Election results ==
Malaysian general election, 2022
Party	Candidate	Votes	%	∆%
PAS	Che Mohamad Zulkifly Jusoh	49,569	59.85	▲17.93
BN	Nawi Mohamad	30,903	37.41	▼4.51
PH	Abd Rahman @ Abd Aziz Abas	4,339	2.50	▲2.50
PEJUANG	Wan Nazari Wan Jusoh	553	0.24	▲0.24
Total valid votes		84,831	100.00	
Total rejected ballots		877		
Unreturned ballots		246		
Turnout		86,487	79.06	▼4.43
Registered electors		111,650		
Majority		18,666	22.44	▲15.96
PAS gain from BN		Swing		?
Source(s) https://lom.agc.gov.my/ilims/upload/portal/akta/outputp/1753269/PUB608%20PARLIMEN%20TERENGGANU.pdf

Malaysian general election, 2018
Party	Candidate	Votes	%	∆%
BN	Idris Jusoh	34,335	48.40	▼8.31
PAS	Riduan Mohamad Nor	29,736	41.92	▼1.37
PKR	Wan Nazari Wan Jusoh	6,864	9.68	▲9.68
Total valid votes		70,935	100.00	
Total rejected ballots		903		
Unreturned ballots		485		
Turnout		72,323	83.49	▼3.35
Registered electors		86,627		
Majority		4,599	6.48	▼6.94
BN hold		Swing		
Source(s) "His Majesty's Government Gazette - Notice of Contested Election, Parliament for the State of Terengganu [P.U. (B) 235/2018]" (PDF). Attorney General's Chambers of Malaysia. 3 May 2018. "Federal Government Gazette - Results of Contested Election and Statements of the Poll after the Official Addition of Votes, Parliamentary Constituencies for the State of Terengganu [P.U. (B) 309/2018]" (PDF). Attorney General's Chambers of Malaysia. 28 May 2018.

Malaysian general election, 2013
Party	Candidate	Votes	%	∆%
BN	Idris Jusoh	35,232	56.71	▼4.28
PAS	Riduan Mohamad Nor	26,890	43.29	▲4.28
Total valid votes		62,122	100.00	
Total rejected ballots		641		
Unreturned ballots		254		
Turnout		63,017	86.84	▲2.35
Registered electors		72,566		
Majority		8,342	13.42	▼8.56
BN hold		Swing		
Source(s) "Federal Government Gazette - Notice of Contested Election, Parliament for the State of Terengganu [P.U. (B) 172/2013]" (PDF). Attorney General's Chambers of Malaysia. 26 April 2013. "Federal Government Gazette - Results of Contested Election and Statements of the Poll after the Official Addition of Votes, Parliamentary Constituencies for the State of Terengganu [P.U. (B) 213/2013]" (PDF). Attorney General's Chambers of Malaysia. 22 May 2013.

Malaysian general election, 2008
Party	Candidate	Votes	%	∆%
BN	Abdullah Md Zin	29,376	60.99	▲1.26
PAS	Husain Awang	18,786	39.01	▼1.26
Total valid votes		48,162	100.00	
Total rejected ballots		668		
Unreturned ballots		473		
Turnout		49,303	84.49	▼2.00
Registered electors		58,353		
Majority		10,590	21.98	▲2.52
BN hold		Swing		

Malaysian general election, 2004
Party	Candidate	Votes	%	∆%
BN	Abdullah Md Zin	26,087	59.73	▲14.29
PAS	Nasharuddin Mat Isa	17,587	40.27	▼14.29
Total valid votes		43,674	100.00	
Total rejected ballots		683		
Unreturned ballots		0		
Turnout		44,357	86.49	▲5.32
Registered electors		51,285		
Majority		8,500	19.46	▲10.84
BN gain from PAS		Swing		?

Malaysian general election, 1999
Party	Candidate	Votes	%	∆%
PAS	Hassan Mohamed	19,166	54.06	▲54.06
BN	Mohamed Yusof Mohamed Noor	16,109	45.44	▼11.17
Independent	Wan Ahmad Wan Omar	175	0.49	▲0.49
Total valid votes		35,450	100.00	
Total rejected ballots		690		
Unreturned ballots		0		
Turnout		36,140	81.17	▼0.20
Registered electors		44,523		
Majority		3,057	8.62	▼4.60
PAS gain from BN		Swing		?

Malaysian general election, 1995
Party	Candidate	Votes	%	∆%
BN	Idris Jusoh	19,294	56.61	▲5.02
S46	Zakaria @ Ibrahim Abdul Rahman	14,787	43.39	▼5.02
Total valid votes		34,081	100.00	
Total rejected ballots		1,260		
Unreturned ballots		96		
Turnout		35,437	81.37	▼2.53
Registered electors		43,550		
Majority		4,507	13.22	▲10.04
BN hold		Swing		

Malaysian general election, 1990
Party	Candidate	Votes	%	∆%
BN	Mohamed Yusof Mohamed Noor	16,148	51.59	▼8.11
S46	Zakaria @ Ibrahim Abdul Rahman	15,154	48.41	▲48.41
Total valid votes		31,302	100.00	
Total rejected ballots		702		
Unreturned ballots				
Turnout		32,004	83.90	▲4.28
Registered electors		38,144		
Majority		994	3.18	▼16.22
BN hold		Swing		

Malaysian general election, 1986
Party	Candidate	Votes	%	∆%
BN	Zakaria @ Ibrahim Abdul Rahman	15,240	59.70	▲2.92
PAS	Abdul Latif Mohamad	10,287	40.30	▼2.92
Total valid votes		25,527	100.00	
Total rejected ballots		547		
Unreturned ballots		0		
Turnout		26,074	79.62	▼3.72
Registered electors		32,749		
Majority		4,953	19.40	▲5.84
BN hold		Swing		

Malaysian general election, 1982
Party	Candidate	Votes	%	∆%
BN	Zakaria @ Ibrahim Abdul Rahman	16,753	56.78	▲1.07
PAS	Cik Man Cik Mat	12,752	43.22	▼1.07
Total valid votes		29,505	100.00	
Total rejected ballots		1,114		
Unreturned ballots		0		
Turnout		30,619	83.34	▲3.39
Registered electors		36,741		
Majority		4,001	13.56	▲2.14
BN hold		Swing		

Malaysian general election, 1978
Party	Candidate	Votes	%	∆%
BN	Zakaria @ Ibrahim Abdul Rahman	12,949	55.71	▲55.71
PAS	Mohd. Daud Abdul Samad	10,294	44.29	▲44.29
Total valid votes		23,243	100.00	
Total rejected ballots		917		
Unreturned ballots		0		
Turnout		24,160	79.95	
Registered electors		30,220		
Majority		2,655	11.42	
BN hold		Swing		

Malaysian general election, 1974
Party	Candidate	Votes	%	∆%
On the nomination day, Zakaria @ Ibrahim Abdul Rahman won uncontested.
BN	Zakaria @ Ibrahim Abdul Rahman			
Total valid votes			100.00	
Total rejected ballots				
Unreturned ballots				
Turnout				
Registered electors		27,810		
Majority				
BN gain from Alliance		Swing		?

Malaysian general election, 1969
Party	Candidate	Votes	%	∆%
Alliance	Hussain Sulaiman	13,830	51.92	▲2.23
PMIP	Jais Anuar	12,805	48.08	▼2.23
Total valid votes		26,635	100.00	
Total rejected ballots		1,234		
Unreturned ballots		0		
Turnout		27,869	78.46	▼4.76
Registered electors		35,522		
Majority		1,025	3.84	▲3.22
Alliance gain from PMIP		Swing		?

Malaysian general election, 1964
Party	Candidate	Votes	%	∆%
PMIP	Mohd. Daud Abdul Samad	10,995	50.31	▼20.01
Alliance	Abu Bakar Ahmad	10,859	49.69	▲20.01
Total valid votes		21,854	100.00	
Total rejected ballots		980		
Unreturned ballots		0		
Turnout		22,834	83.22	▲15.89
Registered electors		27,437		
Majority		136	0.62	▼40.02
PMIP hold		Swing		

Malayan general election, 1959
Party	Candidate	Votes	%
PMIP	Burhanuddin al-Helmy	9,988	70.32
Alliance	Husin Abdullah	4,216	29.68
Total valid votes		14,204	100.00
Total rejected ballots		205	
Unreturned ballots		0	
Turnout		14,409	67.33
Registered electors		21,399	
Majority		5,772	40.64
This was a new constituency created.
