= Nawi Mohamad =

Malaysian politician (born 1963)

Yang Berbahagia Datuk Nawi Mohamad PMW AMT
- نوي بن محمد

Member of the Terengganu State Executive Council (Agriculture, Agro-Based Industry, Plantation Industries and Commodities : 11 May 2013–20 July 2016) (Rural Development, Entrepreneurships, Co-operatives and Consumerism : 20 July 2016–10 May 2018)
- In office 11 May 2013 – 10 May 2018
- Monarch: Mizan Zainal Abidin
- Menteri Besar: Ahmad Razif Abdul Rahman
- Preceded by: Asha'ari Idris
- Succeeded by: Azman Ibrahim (Rural Development); Mohd Nurkhuzaini Ab Rahman (Entrepreneurships, Co-operatives and Consumerism)
- Constituency: Hulu Besut

Deputy Member of the Terengganu State Executive Council (Agriculture and Agro-based Industry)
- In office 9 April 2008 – 10 May 2013
- Monarch: Mizan Zainal Abidin
- Menteri Besar: Ahmad Said
- Member: Rozi Mamat (2008–2010); Asha'ari Idris (2010–2013)
- Preceded by: Position established
- Succeeded by: Position abolished
- Constituency: Hulu Besut

Member of the Terengganu State Legislative Assembly for Hulu Besut
- In office 21 March 2004 – 12 August 2023
- Preceded by: Abdullah Mat Adam (BA–PAS)
- Succeeded by: Mohd Husaimi Hussin (PN–BERSATU)
- Majority: 2,633 (2004); 2,453 (2008); 1,570 (2013); 1,469 (2018)

Faction represented in Terengganu State Legislative Assembly
- 2004–2023: Barisan Nasional

Personal details
- Born: Nawi bin Mohamad; 16 May 1963 (age 62) Kampung Darau, Jerteh, Terengganu, Malaysia
- Citizenship: Malaysian
- Party: United Malays National Organisation (UMNO)
- Other political affiliations: Barisan Nasional (BN)
- Spouse: Nur Asma Ibrahim
- Children: 5
- Occupation: Politician

Nawi bin Mohamad (born 16 May 1963) is a Malaysian politician who served as Member and Deputy Member of the Terengganu State Executive Council (EXCO) in the Barisan Nasional (BN) state administration under former Menteris Besar Ahmad Said and Ahmad Razif Abdul Rahman and former Members Rozi Mamat and Asha'ari Idris from April 2008 to the collapse of the BN state administration in May 2018 as well as Member of the Terengganu State Legislative Assembly (MLA) for Hulu Besut from March 2004 to August 2023. He is a member of the United Malays National Organisation (UMNO), a component party of the BN coalition.

== Election results ==
Terengganu State Legislative Assembly
Year	Constituency	Candidate	Votes	Pct	Opponent(s)	Votes	Pct	Ballots cast	Majority	Turnout
1999	N04 Hulu Besut	Nawi Mohamad (UMNO)	4,021	46.54%	Abdullah Mat Adam (PAS)	4,619	53.46%	8,903	598	80.97%
2004	N04 Hulu Besut	Nawi Mohamad (UMNO)	6,496	62.71%	Abdullah Mat Adam (PAS)	3,863	37.29%	10,519	2,633	87.51%
2008	N04 Hulu Besut	Nawi Mohamad (UMNO)	6,740	61.12%	Mohd Zin Hassan (PAS)	4,287	38.88%	11,174	2,453	84.88%
2013	N04 Hulu Besut	Nawi Mohamad (UMNO)	7,884	55.53%	Salahhudin Jaafar (PAS)	6,314	44.47%	14,368	1,570	88.00%
2018	N04 Hulu Besut	Nawi Mohamad (UMNO)	8,045	51.97%	Mat Daik Mohamad (PAS)	6,576	42.47%	15,788	1,469	84.00%
2018	N04 Hulu Besut	Nawi Mohamad (UMNO)	8,045	51.97%	Ismail Abdul Kadir (BERSATU)	860	5.56%	15,788	1,469	84.00%
2023	N04 Hulu Besut	Nawi Mohamad (UMNO)	6,665	40.71%	Mohd Husaimi Hussin (BERSATU)	9,525	58.19%	16,553	2,860	69.42%
2023	N04 Hulu Besut	Nawi Mohamad (UMNO)	6,665	40.71%	Che Harun (IND)	180	1.10%	16,553	2,860	69.42%

Parliament of Malaysia
Year	Constituency	Candidate	Votes	Pct	Opponent(s)	Votes	Pct	Ballots cast	Majority	Turnout
2022	P033 Besut	Nawi Mohamad (UMNO)	30,903	37.41%	Che Mohamad Zulkifly Jusoh (PAS)	49,569	59.85%	86,487	19,032	79.06%
2022	P033 Besut	Nawi Mohamad (UMNO)	30,903	37.41%	Abdul Rahman @ Abd Aziz Abas (AMANAH)	4,339	2.50%	86,487	19,032	79.06%
2022	P033 Besut	Nawi Mohamad (UMNO)	30,903	37.41%	Wan Nazari Wan Jusoh (PEJUANG)	553	0.24%	86,487	19,032	79.06%

== Honours ==
- Federal Territory (Malaysia)
  - Commander of the Order of the Territorial Crown (PMW) – Datuk (2022)
- Terengganu
  - Member of the Order of the Crown of Terengganu (AMT) (2006)
