= Setiu (federal constituency) =

Federal constituency of Terengganu, Malaysia

Setiu (P034)
Terengganu constituency

Federal constituency
- Legislature: Dewan Rakyat
- MP: Shaharizukirnain Abd. Kadir; PN
- Constituency created: 1984
- First contested: 1986
- Last contested: 2022

Demographics
- Population (2020): 122,390
- Electors (2023): 110,918
- Area (km²): 1,672
- Pop. density (per km²): 73.2

Setiu is a federal constituency which covers Besut District, Kuala Nerus District and Setiu District, Terengganu, Malaysia that has been represented in the Dewan Rakyat since 1986.

The federal constituency was created in the 1984 redistribution and is mandated to return a single member to the Dewan Rakyat under the first past the post voting system.

== Demographics ==
https://live.chinapress.com.my/ge15/parliament/TERENGGANU

Ethnic breakdown of Setiu's electorate as of 2022
1. Malay (99.5%)
2. Chinese (0.30%)
3. Other ethnicities (0.20%)
4. Indian (0.00%)
Age breakdown of Setiu's electorate as of 2022
1. 18-20 (7.04%)
2. 21-29 (24.6%)
3. 30-39 (26.1%)
4. 40-49 (17.6%)
5. 50-59 (12.1%)
6. 60-69 (7.77%)
7. 70-79 (3.55%)
8. 80-89 (1.00%)
9. above 90 (0.18%)
Gender breakdown of Setiu's electorate as of 2022
1. Male (49.6%)
2. Female (50.4%)

== History ==
=== Polling districts ===
According to the federal gazette issued on 18 July 2023, the Setiu constituency is divided into 49 polling districts.

State constituency	Polling district	Code	Location
Jabi (N05)	Kuala Kubang	034/05/01	SK Jabi
Jabi (N05)	Apal	034/05/02	SK Apal
Jabi (N05)	Tanah Merah	034/05/03	SK Kerandong
Jabi (N05)	Kerandang	034/05/04	SK Bukit Tempurong
Jabi (N05)	Jabi	034/05/05	SMK Jabi
Jabi (N05)	Renek	034/05/06	SK Renek
Jabi (N05)	Tempinis	034/05/07	SK Tempinis
Jabi (N05)	Bukit Jeruk	034/05/08	SK Bukit Jerok
Jabi (N05)	Tok Dor	034/05/09	SK Tok Dor
Permaisuri (N06)	Gong Batu	034/06/01	SK Kuala Setiu
Permaisuri (N06)	Bintang	034/06/02	SK Bintang
Permaisuri (N06)	Fikri	034/06/03	SK Kampung Fikri
Permaisuri (N06)	Mangkuk	034/06/04	SK Mangkok
Permaisuri (N06)	Guntung Dalam	034/06/05	SK Guntong
Permaisuri (N06)	Guntung Luar	034/06/06	SMK Guntong
Permaisuri (N06)	Kampung Besut	034/06/07	SK Kampong Besut
Permaisuri (N06)	Permaisuri	034/06/08	SK Kampung Buloh
Permaisuri (N06)	Putera Jaya	034/06/09	SK Putera Jaya
Permaisuri (N06)	Banggul	034/06/10	SK Banggol
Permaisuri (N06)	Penarik	034/06/11	SMK Penarek
Permaisuri (N06)	Bari	034/06/12	SK Bari
Permaisuri (N06)	Telaga Papan	034/06/13	SK Telaga Papan
Permaisuri (N06)	Merang	034/06/14	SK Merang
Permaisuri (N06)	Rhu Sepuluh	034/06/15	SK Rhu Sepuluh
Permaisuri (N06)	Saujana	034/06/16	SK Saujana
Langkap (N07)	Kampung Rahmat	034/07/01	SK Kampung Rahmat
Langkap (N07)	Gong Terap	034/07/02	SK Chalok
Langkap (N07)	Bukit Putera	034/07/03	SK Bukit Putera
Langkap (N07)	Chalok Barat	034/07/04	SK (FELDA) Chalok Barat
Langkap (N07)	Langkap	034/07/05	SK Langkap
Langkap (N07)	Pengkalan Merbau	034/07/06	SK Sungai Tong
Langkap (N07)	Sungai Bari	034/07/07	SK Batu 29
Langkap (N07)	Jelapang	034/07/08	SK Jelapang
Langkap (N07)	Sungai Tong	034/07/09	SMK Sungai Tong
Langkap (N07)	Pelung	034/07/10	SK Pelong
Langkap (N07)	Kampung Bukit	034/07/11	SK Kampung Bukit
Langkap (N07)	Bukit Munduk	034/07/12	SK Bukit Mundok
Langkap (N07)	Chalok Kedai	034/07/13	SMK Chalok
Batu Rakit (N08)	Pulau Redang	034/08/01	SK Pulau Redang
Batu Rakit (N08)	Mengabang Lekar	034/08/02	SK Pagar Besi
Batu Rakit (N08)	Darat Batu Rakit	034/08/03	SK Darat Batu Rakit
Batu Rakit (N08)	Batu Rakit	034/08/04	SK Batu Rakit
Batu Rakit (N08)	Maras	034/08/05	SK Maras
Batu Rakit (N08)	Bukit Wan	034/08/06	SK Bukit Wan
Batu Rakit (N08)	Bukit Cempaka	034/08/07	SMK Bukit Chempaka
Batu Rakit (N08)	Padang Kemunting	034/08/08	SMK Tengku Mizan Zainal Abidin
Batu Rakit (N08)	Wakaf Tengah	034/08/09	SMK Kompleks Mengabang Telipot
Batu Rakit (N08)	Mengabang Teliput	034/08/10	SMK Telipot
Batu Rakit (N08)	Mengabang Telung	034/08/11	SK Kompleks Mengabang Telipot

=== Representation history ===
Members of Parliament for Setiu
Parliament	No	Years	Member	Party	Vote Share
Constituency created from Ulu Nerus and Besut
7th	P031	1986–1990	Mohamed Yusof Mohamed Noor (محمد يوسف محمد نور)	BN (UMNO)	14,714; 62.46%
8th	P031	1990–1995	Tengku Mahmud Tengku Mansor (تڠكو محمود تڠكو منصور)	BN (UMNO)	16,061; 57.05%
9th	P034	1995–1999	Tengku Mahmud Tengku Mansor (تڠكو محمود تڠكو منصور)	BN (UMNO)	17,963; 57.73%
10th	P034	1999–2004	Che Ghani Che Ambak (چئ غني چئ أمبق)	BA (PAS)	18,477; 54.45%
11th	P034	2004–2008	Mohd Yusop Majid (محمد يوسڤ مجيد)	BN (UMNO)	24,546; 58.88%
12th	P034	2008–2013	Mohd Jidin Shafee (محمد جيدين شافعي)	BN (UMNO)	26,610; 57.86%
13th	P034	2013–2018	Che Mohamad Zulkifly Jusoh (چئ محمد ذوالكفل جوسوه)	BN (UMNO)	33,198; 56.79%
14th	P034	2018–2020	Shaharizukarnain Abd. Kadir (شاهرالذوالقرنين عبدالقادر)	GS (PAS)	35,020; 48.65%
14th	P034	2020–2022	Shaharizukarnain Abd. Kadir (شاهرالذوالقرنين عبدالقادر)	PN (PAS)	35,020; 48.65%
15th	P034	2022–present	Shaharizukarnain Abd. Kadir (شاهرالذوالقرنين عبدالقادر)	PN (PAS)	50.768; 59.85%

=== State constituency ===
Parliamentary constituency	State constituency						
Parliamentary constituency	1954–1959*	1959–1974	1974–1986	1986–1995	1995–2004	2004–2018	2018–present
Setiu				Batu Rakit			
Setiu				Jabi			
Setiu				Langkap			
Setiu				Permaisuri			

=== Historical boundaries ===
State Constituency	Area			
State Constituency	1984	1994	2003	2018
Batu Rakit	Batu Rakit; Merang; Kampung Wakaf Cagak; Pulau Bidong; Pulau Redang	Batu Rakit; Kampung Bukit Wan; Kampung Wakaf Cagak; Pulau Bidong; Pulau Redang		Batu Rakit; Kampung Bukit Wan; Kampung Mengabang Telipot; Pulau Bidong; Pulau Redang
Jabi	FELDA Selasih; Jabi; Kampung Alor Serdang; Kampung Gong Lilit; Kampung Tanah Merah			
Langkap	Chalok Kedai; Kampung Pengkalan Merbau; Kampung Payung; Kampung Sungai Bari; Langkap	Chalok Kedai; Kampung Bukit Lawang; Kampung Pengkalan Merbau; Kampung Sungai Bari; Langkap		
Permaisuri	Kampung Beris Tok Ku; Kampung Bintang; Kampung Saujana; Permaisuri; Setiu	Kampung Beris Tok Ku; Kampung Saujana; Merang; Permaisuri; Setiu		

=== Current state assembly members ===
No.	State Constituency	Member	Coalition (Party)
N05	Jabi	Azman Ibrahim	PN (PAS)
N06	Permaisuri	Mohd Yusop Majid	PN (BERSATU)
N07	Langkap	Azmi Maarof	PN (PAS)
N08	Batu Rakit	Mohd Shafizi Ismail	PN (PAS)

=== Local governments & postcodes ===
No.	State Constituency	Local Government	Postcode
N05	Jabi	Besut District Council	21010, 21020, 21030, 21090, 21200 Kuala Terengganu; 21450 Chalok; 21500 Sungai Tong; 22020 Jerteh; 22100, 22110, 22120 Permaisuri
N06	Permaisuri	Setiu District Council	21010, 21020, 21030, 21090, 21200 Kuala Terengganu; 21450 Chalok; 21500 Sungai Tong; 22020 Jerteh; 22100, 22110, 22120 Permaisuri
N07	Langkap	Setiu District Council	21010, 21020, 21030, 21090, 21200 Kuala Terengganu; 21450 Chalok; 21500 Sungai Tong; 22020 Jerteh; 22100, 22110, 22120 Permaisuri
N08	Batu Rakit	Kuala Terengganu City Council	21010, 21020, 21030, 21090, 21200 Kuala Terengganu; 21450 Chalok; 21500 Sungai Tong; 22020 Jerteh; 22100, 22110, 22120 Permaisuri

== Election results ==
Malaysian general election, 2022
Party	Candidate	Votes	%	∆%
PAS	Shaharizukirnain Abdul Kadir	50,768	59.85	▲10.90
BN	Abdul Rahman Yassin	31,736	37.41	▼7.35
PH	Mohamad Ngah	2,125	2.50	▲2.50
PEJUANG	Wan Adnan Wan Ali	203	0.24	▲0.24
Total valid votes		84,832	100.00	
Total rejected ballots		1,044		
Unreturned ballots		153		
Turnout		86,029	79.06	▼6.36
Registered electors		107,294		
Majority		19,032	22.44	▲18.55
PAS hold		Swing		
Source(s) https://lom.agc.gov.my/ilims/upload/portal/akta/outputp/1753269/PUB608%20PARLIMEN%20TERENGGANU.pdf

Malaysian general election, 2018
Party	Candidate	Votes	%	∆%
PAS	Shaharizukirnain Abdul Kadir	35,020	48.65	▼8.14
BN	Mohd Jidin Shafee	32,218	44.76	▼12.03
PKR	Mohd Faudzi Musa	4,740	6.59	▲6.59
Total valid votes		71,978	100.00	
Total rejected ballots		1,244		
Unreturned ballots		451		
Turnout		73,673	85.42	▼2.66
Registered electors		86,247		
Majority		2,802	3.89	▼9.69
PAS gain from BN		Swing		?
Source(s) "His Majesty's Government Gazette - Notice of Contested Election, Parliament for the State of Terengganu [P.U. (B) 235/2018]" (PDF). Attorney General's Chambers of Malaysia. 3 May 2018. "Federal Government Gazette - Results of Contested Election and Statements of the Poll after the Official Addition of Votes, Parliamentary Constituencies for the State of Terengganu [P.U. (B) 309/2018]" (PDF). Attorney General's Chambers of Malaysia. 28 May 2018.

Malaysian general election, 2013
Party	Candidate	Votes	%	∆%
BN	Che Mohamad Zulkifly Jusoh	33,198	56.79	▼1.07
PAS	Omar Sidek	25,255	43.21	▲1.07
Total valid votes		58,453	100.00	
Total rejected ballots		685		
Unreturned ballots		124		
Turnout		59,262	88.08	▲2.20
Registered electors		67,280		
Majority		7,943	13.58	▼2.14
BN hold		Swing		
Source(s) "Federal Government Gazette - Notice of Contested Election, Parliament for the State of Terengganu [P.U. (B) 172/2013]" (PDF). Attorney General's Chambers of Malaysia. 26 April 2013. "Federal Government Gazette - Results of Contested Election and Statements of the Poll after the Official Addition of Votes, Parliamentary Constituencies for the State of Terengganu [P.U. (B) 213/2013]" (PDF). Attorney General's Chambers of Malaysia. 22 May 2013.

Malaysian general election, 2008
Party	Candidate	Votes	%	∆%
BN	Mohd Jidin Shafee	26,610	57.86	▼1.02
PAS	Mohd Pauzi Muda	19,378	42.14	▲1.02
Total valid votes		45,988	100.00	
Total rejected ballots		833		
Unreturned ballots				
Turnout		46,821	85.88	▼2.35
Registered electors		54,520		
Majority		7,232	15.72	▼2.04
BN hold		Swing		

Malaysian general election, 2004
Party	Candidate	Votes	%	∆%
BN	Mohd Yusop Majid	24,546	58.88	▲13.33
PAS	Che Ghani Che Ambak	17,141	41.12	▼13.33
Total valid votes		41,687	100.00	
Total rejected ballots		760		
Unreturned ballots		47		
Turnout		42,494	88.23	▲5.48
Registered electors		48,162		
Majority		7,405	17.76	▲8.86
BN gain from PAS		Swing		?

Malaysian general election, 1999
Party	Candidate	Votes	%	∆%
PAS	Che Ghani Che Ambak	18,477	54.45	▲12.18
BN	Tengku Mahmud Tengku Mansor	15,457	45.55	▼12.18
Total valid votes		33,934	100.00	
Total rejected ballots		704		
Unreturned ballots		34		
Turnout		34,672	82.75	▼0.04
Registered electors		41,899		
Majority		3,020	8.90	▼6.56
PAS gain from BN		Swing		?

Malaysian general election, 1995
Party	Candidate	Votes	%	∆%
BN	Tengku Mahmud Tengku Mansor	17,963	57.73	▲0.68
PAS	Husain Awang	13,155	42.27	▼0.68
Total valid votes		31,118	100.00	
Total rejected ballots		1,245		
Unreturned ballots		52		
Turnout		32,415	82.79	▼1.49
Registered electors		39,153		
Majority		4,808	15.46	▲1.36
BN hold		Swing		

Malaysian general election, 1990
Party	Candidate	Votes	%	∆%
BN	Tengku Mahmud Tengku Mansor	16,061	57.05	▼5.41
PAS	Abu Bakar Chik	12,092	42.95	▲5.41
Total valid votes		28,153	100.00	
Total rejected ballots		655		
Unreturned ballots		0		
Turnout		28,808	84.28	▲3.18
Registered electors		34,183		
Majority		3,969	14.10	▼10.82
BN hold		Swing		

Malaysian general election, 1986
Party	Candidate	Votes	%
BN	Mohamed Yusof Mohamed Noor	14,714	62.46
PAS	Lukman Abdul Kadir	8,842	37.54
Total valid votes		23,556	100.00
Total rejected ballots		606	
Unreturned ballots		0	
Turnout		24,162	81.10
Registered electors		29,793	
Majority		5,872	24.92
This was a new constituency created.
