= Mohd Yusop Majid =

Malaysian politician

Yang Berhormat Tuan Mohd Yusop Majid SMZ MLA

Deputy Member of the Terengganu State Executive Council
- Incumbent
- Assumed office 16 August 2023 (Entrepreneurship, Human Resources, Cooperatives and Consumer Affairs)
- Monarch: Mizan Zainal Abidin
- Menteri Besar: Ahmad Samsuri Mokhtar
- Member: Ariffin Deraman
- Constituency: Permaisuri

Member of the Terengganu State Legislative Assembly for Permaisuri
- Incumbent
- Assumed office 12 August 2023
- Preceded by: Abd Halim Jusoh (BN–UMNO)
- Majority: 7,538 (2023)

Member of the Malaysian Parliament for Setiu
- In office 21 March 2004 – 8 March 2008
- Preceded by: Che Ghani Che Ambak (BA–PAS)
- Succeeded by: Mohd Jidin Shafee (BN–UMNO)
- Majority: 7,405 (2004)

Personal details
- Born: Mohd Yusop bin Majid; 24 March 1963 (age 63) Setiu, Terengganu, Malaysia
- Party: United Malays National Organisation (UMNO); Malaysian United Indigenous Party (BERSATU)
- Other political affiliations: Barisan Nasional (BN); Perikatan Nasional (PN)
- Occupation: Politician

Mohd Yusop bin Majid (born 24 March 1963) is a Malaysian politician who has served as Deputy Member of the Terengganu State Executive Council (EXCO) in the Perikatan Nasional (PN) state administration under Menteri Besar Ahmad Samsuri Mokhtar and Member Ariffin Deraman as well as Member of the Terengganu State Legislative Assembly (MLA) for Permaisuri since August 2023. He served as the Member of Parliament (MP) for Setiu from March 2004 to March 2008. He is a member of the Malaysian United Indigenous Party (BERSATU), a component party of the PN coalition and was a member of the United Malays National Organisation (UMNO), a component party of Barisan Nasional (BN) coalition.

== Election results ==
Parliament of Malaysia
Year	Constituency	Candidate	Votes	Pct	Opponent(s)	Votes	Pct	Ballots cast	Majority	Turnout
2004	P034 Setiu	Mohd Yusop Majid (UMNO)	23,079	58.88%	Che Ghani Che Ambak (PAS)	16,383	41.12%	42,494	7,405	88.23%

Terengganu State Legislative Assembly
Year	Constituency	Candidate	Votes	Pct	Opponent(s)	Votes	Pct	Ballots cast	Majority	Turnout
2013	N06 Permaisuri	Mohd Yusop Majid (IND)	1,920	11.05%	Mohd Jidin Shafee (UMNO)	9,188	52.90%		2,928	
2013	N06 Permaisuri	Mohd Yusop Majid (IND)	1,920	11.05%	Wan Mokhtar Wan Ibrahim (PKR)	6,260	36.04%		2,928	
2023	N06 Permaisuri	Mohd Yusop Majid (BERSATU)	14,837	67.03%	Hamdan Hamzah (UMNO)	7,299	32.97%	22,322	7,538	72.62%

== Honours ==
- Terengganu
  - Companion of the Order of Sultan Mizan Zainal Abidin of Terengganu (SMZ) (2006)
