= Muhammad Pehimi Yusof =

Malaysian politician

Yang Berbahagia Dato' Muhammad Pehimi Yusof DPMT PPN
- محمّد ڤهيمي يوسف
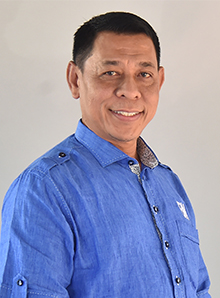

Member of the Terengganu State Executive Council (Health, Woman Development, Family and Community : 27 November 2014–2 July 2016) (Agriculture, Agro-Based Industry, Plantation Industries and Commodities : 20 July 2016–10 May 2018)
- In office 27 November 2014 – 10 May 2018
- Monarch: Mizan Zainal Abidin
- Menteri Besar: Ahmad Razif Abdul Rahman
- Preceded by: A. Rahman Mokhtar
- Succeeded by: Azman Ibrahim
- Constituency: Jertih

Deputy Member of the Terengganu State Executive Council
- In office 9 April 2008 – 10 May 2013 (Agriculture and Agro-based Industry)
- Monarch: Mizan Zainal Abidin
- Menteri Besar: Ahmad Said
- Member: Rozi Mamat (2008–2010); Asha'ari Idris (2008–2013)
- Preceded by: Position established
- Succeeded by: Position abolished
- Constituency: Kota Putera

Member of the Terengganu State Legislative Assembly for Jertih
- In office 5 May 2013 – 12 August 2023
- Preceded by: Idris Jusoh (BN–UMNO)
- Succeeded by: Riduan Mohamad Nor (PN–PAS)
- Majority: 930 (2013); 1,381 (2018)

Member of the Terengganu State Legislative Assembly for Kota Putera
- In office 8 March 2008 – 5 May 2013
- Preceded by: Wan Mohd Wan Hassan (BN–UMNO)
- Succeeded by: Mohd Mahdi Musa (BN–UMNO)
- Majority: 3,332 (2008)

Faction represented in Terengganu State Legislative Assembly
- 2008–2023: Barisan Nasional

Personal details
- Born: Muhammad Pehimi bin Yusof Terengganu, Malaysia
- Citizenship: Malaysian
- Party: United Malays National Organisation (UMNO)
- Other political affiliations: Barisan Nasional (BN)
- Spouse: Roslida Daud
- Children: 5
- Occupation: Politician

Muhammad Pehimi bin Yusof is a Malaysian politician who served as Member and Deputy Member of the Terengganu State Executive Council (EXCO) in the Barisan Nasional (BN) state administration under former Menteris Besar Ahmad Said, Ahmad Razif Abdul Rahman and former Members Rozi Mamat and Asha'ari Idris from April 2008 to the collapse of the BN state administration in May 2018 as well as Member of the Terengganu State Legislative Assembly (MLA) for Jertih from May 2013 to August 2023 and for Kota Putera from March 2008 to May 2013. He is a member and the Division Chief of Besut of the United Malays National Organisation (UMNO), a component party of the BN coalition.

== Election results ==
Terengganu State Legislative Assembly
Year	Constituency	Candidate	Votes	Pct	Opponent(s)	Votes	Pct	Ballots cast	Majority	Turnout
2008	N02 Kota Putera	Muhammad Pehimi Yusof (UMNO)	8,090	62.97%	Che Mohamad Mohd. Amin (PKR)	4,758	37.03%	13,071	3,332	84.01%
2013	N03 Jertih	Muhammad Pehimi Yusof (UMNO)	8,396	52.93%	Wan Azhar Wan Ahmad (PAS)	7,466	47.07%	16,034	930	85.80%
2018	N03 Jertih	Muhammad Pehimi Yusof (UMNO)	9,143	49.16%	Wan Azhar Wan Ahmad (PAS)	7,862	42.27%	18,855	1,381	82.40%
2018	N03 Jertih	Muhammad Pehimi Yusof (UMNO)	9,143	49.16%	Kamaruzaman Wan Su (AMANAH)	1,594	8.57%	18,855	1,381	82.40%
2023	N02 Kota Putera	Muhammad Pehimi Yusof (UMNO)	9,551	41.69%	Mohd Nurkhuzaini Ab Rahman (PAS)	13,360	58.31%	23,041	3,809	70.26%

== Honours ==
- Malaysia
  - Medal of the Order of the Defender of the Realm (PPN) (2003)
- Terengganu
  - Knight Commander of the Order of the Crown of Terengganu (DPMT) – Dato' (2015)
