= Mohd Jidin Shafee =

Malaysian politician

Yang Berbahagia Dato' Mohd Jidin Shafee DPMT DMSM KMN AMN
- محمد جيدين شافعي

Member of the Terengganu State Executive Council
- In office 20 July 2016 – 10 May 2018 (Local Government and Housing)
- Monarch: Mizan Zainal Abidin
- Menteri Besar: Ahmad Razif Abdul Rahman
- Preceded by: Za'abar Mohd Adib (Tourism and Culture); Khazan Che Mat (Information and Communications)
- Succeeded by: Alias Razak
- Constituency: Permaisuri
- In office 11 May 2013 – 20 July 2016 (Tourism, Information, Communications and Culture)
- Monarch: Mizan Zainal Abidin
- Menteri Besar: Ahmad Said; Ahmad Razif Abdul Rahman
- Constituency: Permaisuri
- In office 25 March 2004 – 8 April 2008 (Agriculture and Regional Development)
- Monarch: Mizan Zainal Abidin
- Menteri Besar: Idris Jusoh
- Preceded by: Abu Bakar Chik
- Succeeded by: Rozi Mamat (Agriculture)
- Constituency: Permaisuri

Member of the Malaysian Parliament for Setiu, Terengganu
- In office 8 March 2008 – 5 May 2013
- Preceded by: Mohd Yusop Majid (BN–UMNO)
- Succeeded by: Che Mohamad Zulkifly Jusoh (BN–UMNO)
- Majority: 7,232 (2008)

Personal details
- Born: Mohd Jidin bin Shafee; 4 April 1955 (age 71) Terengganu, Federation of Malaya (now Malaysia)
- Citizenship: Malaysian
- Party: United Malays National Organisation (UMNO)
- Other political affiliations: Barisan Nasional (BN); Perikatan Nasional (PN); Muafakat Nasional (MN)
- Parent: Shafee Omar (father)
- Occupation: Politician

Datuk Mohd Jidin bin Shafee (born 4 April 1955) is a Malaysian politician. He was a one-term Member of the Parliament of Malaysia for the Setiu constituency in Terengganu, Malaysia from 2008 to 2013. Mohd Jidin also holds the seat of Permaisuri in the State Assembly of Terengganu for three times (1995–1999, 2004-2008 and 2013–2018). His long tenure in the assembly, which included a stint as a member of the State Executive Council, was interrupted in 2008 when he was elected to the Parliament of Malaysia for the seat of Setiu. He returned to the State Assembly in the 2013 election, in his old seat of Permaisuri, and was reappointed to the Executive Council with responsibilities for tourism, information, communications and culture.

He was conferred the title of Datuk in 2007.

== Election results ==
Terengganu State Legislative Assembly
Year	Constituency	Candidate	Votes	Pct	Opponent	Votes	Pct	Ballots cast	Majority	Turnout
1995	N06 Permaisuri	Mohd Jidin Shafee (UMNO)	5,765	64.32%	Abdullah Mat Amin (S46)	3,198	35.68%	9,261	2,567	82.72%
1999	N06 Permaisuri	Mohd Jidin Shafee (UMNO)	4,729	47.68%	Rozali Muhammad (PAS)	5,180	52.22%	10,168	451	83.85%
2004	N06 Permaisuri	Mohd Jidin Shafee (UMNO)	7,690	60.79%	Rozali Muhammad (PAS)	4,955	39.17%	12,810	2,735	89.26%
2013	N06 Permaisuri	Mohd Jidin Shafee (UMNO)	9,188	52.78%	Wan Mokhtar Ibrahim (PKR)	6,260	35.96%	17,805	2,928	87.61%

Parliament of Malaysia
Year	Constituency	Candidate	Votes	Pct	Opponent	Votes	Pct	Ballots cast	Majority	Turnout
2008	P034 Setiu	Mohd Jidin Shafee (UMNO)	26,610	57.86%	Mohd Pauzi Muda (PAS)	19,378	42.14%	46,821	7,232	85.88%
2018	P034 Setiu	Mohd Jidin Shafee (UMNO)	32,218	44.76%	Shaharizukirnain Abdul Kadir (PAS)	35,020	48.65%	73,673	2,802	85.42%
2018	P034 Setiu	Mohd Jidin Shafee (UMNO)	32,218	44.76%	Mohd Faudzi Musa (PPBM)	4,740	6.59%	73,673	2,802	85.42%

== Honours ==
=== Honours of Malaysia ===
- Malaysia
  - Member of the Order of the Defender of the Realm (AMN) (2001)
  - Officer of the Order of the Defender of the Realm (KMN) (2006)
- Malacca
  - Companion Class I of the Exalted Order of Malacca (DMSM) – Datuk (2004)
- Terengganu
  - Knight Commander of the Order of the Crown of Terengganu (DPMT) – Dato' (2007)
