= Abd Halim Jusoh =

Malaysian politician (born 1965)

Yang Berbahagia Datuk Abd Halim Jusoh DPSM PJK
- عبدالحليم بن جوسوه

Deputy Member of the Terengganu State Executive Council (Industry, Trade and Environment)
- In office 9 April 2008 – 10 May 2013
- Monarch: Mizan Zainal Abidin
- Menteri Besar: Ahmad Said
- Member: Toh Chin Yaw
- Preceded by: Position established
- Succeeded by: Position abolished
- Constituency: Permaisuri

Member of the Terengganu State Legislative Assembly for Permaisuri
- In office 9 May 2018 – 12 August 2023
- Preceded by: Mohd Jidin Shafee (BN–UMNO)
- Succeeded by: Mohd Yusop Majid (PN–BERSATU)
- Majority: 1,970 (2018)
- In office 8 March 2008 – 5 May 2013
- Preceded by: Mohd Jidin Shafee (BN–UMNO)
- Succeeded by: Mohd Jidin Shafee (BN–UMNO)
- Majority: 3,639 (2008)

Faction represented in Terengganu State Legislative Assembly
- 2008–2013: Barisan Nasional
- 2018–2023: Barisan Nasional

Personal details
- Born: Abd Halim bin Jusoh; 23 February 1965 (age 61) Terengganu, Malaysia
- Citizenship: Malaysian
- Party: United Malays National Organisation (UMNO)
- Other political affiliations: Barisan Nasional (BN)
- Occupation: Politician

Yang Berbahagia Datuk Abd Halim bin Jusoh (born 23 February 1965) is a Malaysian politician who served as Deputy Member of the Terengganu State Executive Council (EXCO) in the Barisan Nasional (BN) state administration under former Menteri Besar Ahmad Said from April 2008 to May 2013 and Member of the Terengganu State Legislative Assembly (MLA) for Permaisuri from March 2008 to May 2013 and again from May 2018 to August 2023. He is a member of the United Malays National Organisation (UMNO), a component party of the BN coalition.

== Election results ==
Terengganu State Legislative Assembly
Year	Constituency	Candidate	Votes	Pct	Opponent(s)	Votes	Pct	Ballots cast	Majority	Turnout
2008	N06 Permaisuri	Abd Halim Jusoh (UMNO)	8,652	63.32%	Wan Rahim Wan Hamzah (PAS)	5,013	36.68%	13,910	3,639	86.54%
2018	N06 Permaisuri	Abd Halim Jusoh (UMNO)	10,385	52.84%	Zul Bhari A Rahman (PAS)	8,415	42.82%	20,090	1,970	84.30%
2018	N06 Permaisuri	Abd Halim Jusoh (UMNO)	10,385	52.84%	Wan Mokhtar Wan Ibrahim (PKR)	853	4.34%	20,090	1,970	84.30%

== Honours ==
- Malacca
  - Companion Class II of the Exalted Order of Malacca (DPSM) – Datuk (2013)
- Terengganu
  - Recipient of the Meritorious Service Medal (PJK) (2011)
