= Abdullah Md Zin =

Malaysian politician

Yang Berbahagia Tan Sri Dato' Seri Abdullah Md Zin PSM SPMP DPMT
- عبدﷲ مد زين
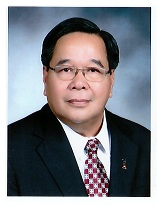

Minister in the Prime Minister's Department Islamic Affairs
- In office 27 March 2004 – 18 March 2008
- Monarchs: Sirajuddin; Mizan Zainal Abidin
- Prime Minister: Abdullah Ahmad Badawi
- Preceded by: Abdul Hamid Zainal Abidin
- Succeeded by: Ahmad Zahid Hamidi
- Constituency: Besut

Member of the Malaysian Parliament for Besut, Terengganu
- In office 21 March 2004 – 5 May 2013
- Preceded by: Nasharudin Mat Isa
- Succeeded by: Idris Jusoh
- Majority: 8,500 (2004); 10,590 (2008)

Adviser to the Prime Minister on Islamic Affairs
- In office 3 April 2009 – 2017
- Monarchs: Mizan Zainal Abidin; Abdul Halim; Muhammad V
- Prime Minister: Najib Razak
- Preceded by: position established
- Succeeded by: position abolished

Personal details
- Born: Abdullah bin Md Zin; 2 August 1946 (age 80) Alor Selinsing, Jerteh, Besut, Terengganu, Malayan Union (now Malaysia)
- Party: United Malays National Organisation (UMNO)
- Other political affiliations: Barisan Nasional (BN); Perikatan Nasional (PN); Muafakat Nasional (MN)
- Spouse: Wan Naimah Wan Latif
- Education: Islamic University of Madinah; University of Kent; Al-Azhar University
- Occupation: Politician, Advisor of Islamic affairs
- Profession: Lecturer

Abdullah bin Md Zin (Jawi: عبدﷲ بن مد زين; born 2 August 1946) is a former Member of the Parliament of Malaysia for the Besut constituency in Terengganu from 2004 to 2013, sitting as a member of the United Malays National Organisation (UMNO) in Malaysia's ruling Barisan Nasional coalition.

== Early life and career ==
Abdullah was born on 2 August 1946 in Alor Selinsing, Jerteh, Besut, Terengganu. He studied at the Islamic University of Madinah, graduating in 1972 with a bachelor's degree in Islamic Studies.

In 1973, he obtained a master's degree in Syariah from Al-Azhar University, Egypt, before receiving a Diploma in Education from Ain Shams University. He was awarded a Doctorate of Philosophy from Kent University, England, in 1986.

Abdullah became a lecturer in 1976, firstly at Kolej Islam Klang and then at the National University of Malaysia (UKM). In 1998, he was appointed the dean of the Faculty of Islamic Studies and in 1999 he became a professor. In 2000, he was appointed Deputy Rector (Academic and Research) at Kolej Universiti Islam Malaysia (KUIM) in Nilai, Negeri Sembilan.

== Politics ==
Abdullah resigned from his lecturing position KUIM (but took early optional compulsory retirement from civil service at 58) in order to be the Barisan Nasional candidate for the federal parliamentary seat of Besut, Terengganu in the 2004 election. The seat had been held by the opposition Pan-Malaysian Islamic Party (PAS). Abdullah won the seat, defeating PAS's Nasharudin Mat Isa.

Later, Abdullah became a member of UMNO's Supreme Council and a Minister in the Department of Prime Minister Abdullah Ahmad Badawi. After the 2008 election, he was dropped from the cabinet and in the 2009 UMNO party elections, he failed to retain a position on the party's Supreme Council.

When Najib Tun Razak became Prime Minister in 2009, Abdullah became his Islamic religious affairs adviser. However, Abdullah did not recontest his parliamentary seat in the 2013 election, although he remained as Najib's religious adviser.

== Election results ==
Parliament of Malaysia
Year	Constituency	Candidate	Votes	Pct	Opponent(s)	Votes	Pct	Ballots cast	Majority	Turnout
2004	P033 Besut	Abdullah Md Zin (UMNO)	26,087	59.73%	Nasharuddin Mat Isa (PAS)	17,587	40.27%	44,357	8,500	86.49%
2008	P033 Besut	Abdullah Md Zin (UMNO)	29,376	60.99%	Husain Awang (PAS)	18,786	39.01%	49,303	10,590	84.49%

== Honours ==
=== Honours of Malaysia ===
- Malaysia
  - Commander of the Order of Loyalty to the Crown of Malaysia (PSM) – Tan Sri (2013)
- Terengganu
  - Knight Commander of the Order of the Crown of Terengganu (DPMT) – Dato' (1996)
- Perlis
  - Knight Grand Commander of the Order of the Crown of Perlis (SPMP) – Dato' Seri (2010)
