= Che Mohamad Zulkifly Jusoh =

Malaysian politician

Yang Berhormat Datuk Che Mohamad Zulkifly Jusoh PJN AMN MP
- چئ محمد ذوالكفل جوسوه

Member of the Malaysian Parliament for Besut
- Incumbent
- Assumed office 19 November 2022
- Preceded by: Idris Jusoh (BN–UMNO)
- Majority: 18,666 (2022)

Member of the Malaysian Parliament for Setiu
- In office 5 May 2013 – 9 May 2018
- Preceded by: Mohd Jidin Shafee (BN–UMNO)
- Succeeded by: Shaharizukirnain Abdul Kadir (PAS)
- Majority: 7,943 (2013)

Personal details
- Born: Che Mohamad Zulkifly bin Jusoh; 16 September 1959 (age 66) Setiu, Terengganu, Federation of Malaya (now Malaysia)
- Party: United Malays National Organisation (UMNO) (–2018); Malaysian Islamic Party (PAS) (since 2018)
- Other political affiliations: Barisan Nasional (BN) (–2018); Perikatan Nasional (PN) (since 2020)
- Occupation: Politician

Che Mohamad Zulkifly bin Jusoh (born 16 September 1959) is a Malaysian politician who has served as the Member of Parliament (MP) for Besut since November 2022 and for Setiu from May 2013 to May 2018. He is a member of the Malaysian Islamic Party (PAS), a component party of the Perikatan Nasional (PN) coalition and was a member of the United Malays National Organisation (UMNO), a component party of the Barisan Nasional (BN) coalition.

== Debate on the Domestic Violence Act (Amendments) 2017 bill ==
On July 15, 2017 during the debate tabling on the Domestic Violence Act (Amendments) 2017 bill in the Dewan Rakyat, Jusoh remarked that wives withholding sex from their husbands or the right to marry another woman should be considered a Sharia-related crime or marital offence which is brought by emotional and psychological abuse.

His statement sparked criticism from Women's Aid Organisation and many politicians; however Muslim Welfare Organisation Malaysia agreed with Jusoh's remarks.

== Election results ==
Parliament of Malaysia
Year	Constituency	Candidate	Votes	Pct	Opponent(s)	Votes	Pct	Ballots cast	Majority	Turnout
2013	P034 Setiu	Che Mohamad Zulkifly Jusoh (UMNO)	33,198	56.79%	Omar Sidek (PAS)	25,255	43.21%	59,262	7,943	88.08%
2022	P033 Besut	Che Mohamad Zulkifly Jusoh (PAS)	49,569	59.85%	Nawi Mohamad (UMNO)	30,903	37.41%	84,831	19,032	79.06%
2022	P033 Besut	Che Mohamad Zulkifly Jusoh (PAS)	49,569	59.85%	Abdul Rahman @ Abd Aziz Abas (AMANAH)	4,339	2.50%	84,831	19,032	79.06%
2022	P033 Besut	Che Mohamad Zulkifly Jusoh (PAS)	49,569	59.85%	Wan Nazari Wan Jusoh (PEJUANG)	553	0.24%	84,831	19,032	79.06%

== Honours ==
=== Honours of Malaysia ===
- Malaysia
  - Commander of the Order of Meritorious Service (PJN) – Datuk (2017)
  - Member of the Order of the Defender of the Realm (AMN) (2008)
  - Recipient of the 17th Yang di-Pertuan Agong Installation Medal (2024)
