= Shaharizukirnain Abdul Kadir =

Malaysian politician

Yang Berhormat Tuan Shaharizukirnain Abdul Kadir SMT MP
- شاهرذوالقرنين عبدالقادر

Member of the Malaysian Parliament for Setiu
- Incumbent
- Assumed office 9 May 2018
- Preceded by: Che Mohamad Zulkifly Jusoh (BN–UMNO)
- Majority: 2,802 (2018); 19,032 (2022)

Member of the Terengganu State Legislative Assembly for Jabi
- In office 29 November 1999 – 21 March 2004
- Preceded by: Mohd Lukman Muda (BN–UMNO)
- Succeeded by: Ramlan Ali (BN–UMNO)

Faction represented in Dewan Rakyat
- 2018–2020: Malaysian Islamic Party
- 2020–: Perikatan Nasional

Other roles
- 2020–: Chairman of Tabung Ekonomi Kumpulan Usahawan Niaga Nasional (TEKUN Nasional)

Personal details
- Born: Shaharizukirnain bin Abdul Kadir; 22 November 1969 (age 56) Setiu, Terengganu, Malaysia
- Citizenship: Malaysian
- Party: Malaysian Islamic Party (PAS)
- Other political affiliations: Barisan Alternatif (BA) (1999–2004); Pakatan Rakyat (PR) (2008–2015); Gagasan Sejahtera (GS) (2016–2020); Perikatan Nasional (PN) (since 2020)
- Occupation: Politician

Shaharizukirnain bin Abdul Kadir (Jawi شاهرالذوالقرنين عبدالقدير; born 22 November 1969) is a Malaysian politician who has served as the Member of Parliament (MP) for Setiu since May 2018. He served as Member of the Terengganu State Legislative Assembly (MLA) for Jabi from November 1999 to March 2004. He is the chairman of the Tabung Ekonomi Kumpulan Usahawan Niaga Nasional (TEKUN Nasional) government-linked company. He is a member of the Malaysian Islamic Party (PAS), a component party of the Perikatan Nasional (PN) and formerly Gagasan Sejahtera (GS), Pakatan Rakyat (PR) and Barisan Alternatif (BA) coalitions.

== Election results ==
Terengganu State Legislative Assembly
| Year | Constituency | Candidate | Votes | Pct | Opponent(s) | Votes | Pct | Ballots cast | Majority | Turnout |
|---|---|---|---|---|---|---|---|---|---|---|
| 1999 | N05 Jabi | Shaharizukirnain Abdul Kadir (PAS) | 5,013 | 58.76% | Ramlan Ali (UMNO) | 3,519 | 41.24% | 8,732 | 1,494 | 80.55% |

Parliament of Malaysia
| Year | Constituency | Candidate | Votes | Pct | Opponent(s) | Votes | Pct | Ballots cast | Majority | Turnout |
|---|---|---|---|---|---|---|---|---|---|---|
| 2018 | P034 Setiu | Shaharizukirnain Abdul Kadir (PAS) | 35,020 | 48.65% | Mohd Jidin Shafee (UMNO) | 32,218 | 44.76% | 73,673 | 2,802 | 85.42% |
| 2018 | P034 Setiu | Shaharizukirnain Abdul Kadir (PAS) | 35,020 | 48.65% | Mohd Faudzi Musa (BERSATU) | 4,740 | 6.59% | 73,673 | 2,802 | 85.42% |
| 2022 | P034 Setiu | Shahrizulkarnain Abdul Kadir (PAS) | 50,768 | 59.85% | Abdul Rahman Yassin (UMNO) | 31,736 | 37.41% | 84,832 | 19,032 | 79.06% |
| 2022 | P034 Setiu | Shahrizulkarnain Abdul Kadir (PAS) | 50,768 | 59.85% | Mohamad Ngah (PKR) | 2,125 | 2.50% | 84,832 | 19,032 | 79.06% |
| 2022 | P034 Setiu | Shahrizulkarnain Abdul Kadir (PAS) | 50,768 | 59.85% | Wan Adnan Wan Ali (PEJUANG) | 203 | 0.24% | 84,832 | 19,032 | 79.06% |

== Honours ==
=== Honours of Malaysia ===
- Malaysia
  - Recipient of the 17th Yang di-Pertuan Agong Installation Medal (2024)
- Terengganu
  - Companion of the Order of the Crown of Terengganu (SMT) (2022)
