= Salleh Abas =

Malaysian judge (1929–2021)

Yang Amat Berbahagia Tun Mohamed Salleh Abas SSM PMN PSM SPMT DPMT PYGP JMN SMT
- محمد صالح عباس

Lord President of the Supreme Court
- In office 2 March 1984 – 11 August 1988
- Monarchs: Ahmad Shah; Iskandar
- Prime Minister: Mahathir Mohamad
- Preceded by: Raja Azlan Shah
- Succeeded by: Abdul Hamid Omar

Terengganu State Executive Councillor for Accountability and Special Tasks
- In office 2 December 1999 – 24 March 2004
- Monarch: Mizan Zainal Abidin
- Menteri Besar: Abdul Hadi Awang
- Preceded by: Position Established
- Succeeded by: Wan Mohd Wan Hassan
- Constituency: Jertih

Member of the Terengganu State Legislative Assembly for Jertih
- In office 29 November 1999 – 21 March 2004
- Preceded by: Idris Mamat (UMNO–BN)
- Succeeded by: Idris Jusoh (UMNO–BN)
- Majority: 1,464 (1999)

Chairman of the Shariah Board of As-Salihin Trustee Berhad
- In office 23 October 2004 – 16 January 2021

Personal details
- Born: 25 August 1929 Kampung Raja, Besut, Terengganu, Unfederated Malay States, British Malaya (now Malaysia)
- Died: 16 January 2021 (aged 91) Kuala Terengganu, Terengganu, Malaysia
- Resting place: Sheikh Ibrahim Muslim Cemetery, Jalan Pusara, Kuala Terengganu
- Party: Malaysian Islamic Party (PAS); Parti Melayu Semangat 46 (S46); United Malays National Organisation (UMNO)
- Spouse(s): Azimah Mohd Ali (died 2016); Wan Junaidah Wan Jusoh
- Education: University of Wales

Mohamed Salleh bin Abas (Jawi: محمد صالح بن عباس; 25 August 1929 – 16 January 2021) was a Malaysian judge and politician. He was a Lord President of the Federal (then Supreme) Court of Malaysia. He was dismissed from his post during the 1988 Malaysian constitutional crisis. This action was condemned internationally and widely considered to be the event that triggered a marked reduction in the independence of the Malaysian judiciary.

== Early life ==
Salleh was born in Kampung Raja, Besut, Terengganu. He left in 1949 for the United Kingdom, where he graduated with a degree in law from the University of Wales, Aberystwyth. In 1957 when he returned, he joined the legal service. He then served in Kota Baru, Kelantan as a magistrate. Soon after independence that same year, he was transferred to the national capital of Kuala Lumpur, where he served as deputy public prosecutor. He then returned to Britain to obtain a master's degree in international law and constitution at the University of London. He returned in 1962, upon which he was appointed state legal adviser and deputy public prosecutor for both Negeri Sembilan and Melaka. He returned to Kuala Lumpur a year later, and served in a variety of posts under the attorney-general, culminating in an appointment as solicitor-general.

At the age of 50, he wanted to retire but was persuaded otherwise by then Lord President of the Federal Court, Tun Suffian Hashim. Salleh was appointed a Federal Court judge instead. Although the work bored him, he continued. When Suffian retired in 1982 and was replaced by Raja Azlan Shah, Salleh became Chief Justice of Malaya. However, within two years, the Sultan of Perak died. Raja Azlan had to resign to ascend the throne, and Salleh became Lord President in 1984.

During Salleh's tenure, the Federal Court became officially the highest court in the land. Previously, its decisions could have been appealed to the British Privy Council, but due to concern over this colonial legacy, the link was officially cut. Salleh later expressed regret over this, as he believed he might not have been fired had the link to the Privy Council been maintained. In 1985, following the total abolishment of appeal to the Privy Council in the UK, the Federal Court was renamed the Supreme Court, and Salleh automatically became the first Lord President of the Supreme Court.

== Constitutional crisis ==
United Malays National Organisation (UMNO) was the major component party and leader of the governing Barisan Nasional (BN) coalition, and its president presumably will become Prime Minister of Malaysia. In the 1987 UMNO leadership election, Tengku Razaleigh Hamzah had challenged the incumbent UMNO president and Prime Minister Mahathir Mohamad, and was widely touted to win the Presidency. However, Mahathir won 761 votes to Razaleigh's 718 and remained President. Many of Razaleigh's supporters refused to accept this and argued that the election was tainted. 12 UMNO members filed suit in the High Court, attempting to get a court order for new elections. As part of their evidence, they presented claims that 78 of the 1,479 delegates eligible to vote in the elections were illegal and that several documents involved in the election had been tampered with. Later, one of the 12 plaintiffs withdrew from the suit. Although Razaleigh was not involved in the case, it was widely believed he had been funding and supporting the suit.

On 30 September 1987, the High Court gave the parties two weeks to reach a negotiated settlement. A "Unity Panel" was formed to negotiate between the Mahathir and Razaleigh camps, but it soon appeared the differences were interminable. Razaleigh's supporters wanted new elections held, while Mahathir's supporters insisted that the elections stand and that Razaleigh's camp accept a compromise "face-saving" solution. On 19 October, the plaintiffs announced the continuation of the suit.

Mahathir, who had never been fond of the judiciary, began making heated statements about it at this time. Mahathir declared, "The judiciary says, 'Although you passed a law with a certain thing in mind, we think that your mind is wrong, and we want to give our interpretation.' If we disagree, the courts will say, 'We will interpret your disagreement.' ... We know exactly what we want to do, but once we do it, it is interpreted in a different way." Mahathir also lambasted "black sheep ... who want to be ... fiercely independent" and play to public opinion. Soon after, nine judges sitting on the High Court were reassigned to different divisions; Justice Harun Hashim, who presided over the UMNO case, was transferred from appellate and special powers cases to commercial crimes. However, because the UMNO case was already in progress, his transfer did not take effect until the case closed. Harun later ruled that under the evidence presented, it was clear several UMNO delegates had come from unregistered branches of the party. In line with the law, he declared he was forced to declare UMNO an illegal society, and thereby dismissed the case of the plaintiffs. Mahathir soon formed a new party, UMNO Baru (New UMNO), to replace UMNO. Within a year, the suffix "Baru" was dropped, making it just plain "UMNO".

Mahathir was upset with the judiciary's increasing independence, and in 1988, the government tabled a bill in Parliament to amend Articles 121 and 145 of the Constitution. These amendments divested the courts of the "judicial power of the Federation", giving them only such power as Parliament might grant them. The attorney-general was also empowered to determine the venues in which cases would be heard.

At this point, Salleh, who was then Lord President of the Supreme Court, began making strong statements about defending the autonomy of the judiciary. However, he did not name Mahathir and spoke in rather general terms. However, Salleh was pressured by his fellow judges into taking stronger action. He convened a meeting of all 20 federal judges in the national capital of Kuala Lumpur. They decided not to directly challenge Mahathir, and instead address a confidential letter to the Yang di-Pertuan Agong (King) and the rulers of the various states. The letter stated, "All of us are disappointed with the various comments and accusations made by the Honourable Prime Minister against the Judiciary, not only outside but within the Parliament." However, instead of calling for any direct action to be taken, the letter only stated the judges' "hope that all those unfounded accusations will be stopped". The king, Sultan Mahmud Iskandar of Johor, back in 1973 when he was still the heir apparent to the Johor throne had been prosecuted for criminal charges by Salleh as the Public Prosecutor. Tunku Mahmud then was convicted and sentenced to six months in jail eventually. It is not known what the king did upon receipt of the letter, but it appears he informed Mahathir, and that they agreed to take disciplinary action against Salleh Abas.

Salleh, who had gone overseas soon after the letter was sent, was summoned by Mahathir upon his return. Salleh later claimed that at the meeting, Mahathir accused him of bias in the UMNO case, and demanded his resignation. Salleh was also immediately suspended from his post as Lord President. Although Salleh initially agreed, when he was later informed that his suspension was to be backdated so as to nullify some of his earlier actions in then-pending cases such as the UMNO case, he withdrew his resignation. The government then initiated impeachment proceedings against Salleh. Salleh later claimed that the government attempted to bribe him to resign.

Salleh was represented by Anthony Lester, QC, who objected to the tribunal's composition. It was argued Abdul Hamid had a vested interest in the case's outcome since if Salleh was impeached, he would remain Lord President. It was also claimed that the tribunal was improperly constituted because two of the judges were relatively junior and that the two foreign judges were from countries not noted for judicial independence. Salleh demanded to be tried by peers of equal standing – retired Lord presidents if need be. He also demanded that the tribunal make its hearings public. All of these claims were rejected by the tribunal, and Salleh withdrew from the proceedings.

Instead, Salleh asked the Supreme Court to stay the proceedings because of the tribunal's alleged improper constitution and because the King had been "wrongfully advised". The Supreme Court, in an emergency session, unanimously ruled that the proceedings stay. Four days later, the Yang di-Pertuan Agong suspended the five Supreme Court judges who had issued the order, on Mahathir's advice. The government announced that it would attempt to impeach those five judges as well for "gross misbehaviour" and conspiring "to make the order". This reduced the number of judges on the Supreme Court to four, with two of them also sitting on the tribunal. The government-appointed new judges to fill the void, who refused to hear any further motions by Salleh Abas. The tribunal eventually found Salleh guilty, and he was officially relieved of his position. Of the five judges who had supported him, two were convicted, and the other three were acquitted.

== Post-conviction and politics involvement ==
Soon after his dismissal in 1988, Salleh was conferred the "Darjah Pahlawan Yang Amat Gagah Perkasa (P.Y.G.P.)", by the sultan of Kelantan.

Salleh contested the 1995 general election for the Lembah Pantai parliamentary constituency (an area in Kuala Lumpur which includes the neighbourhood of Bangsar) under the Parti Melayu Semangat 46 (S46) ticket, and failed to be elected.

In the 1999 general election, Salleh was elected as Terengganu State Assemblyman for the constituency of Jertih on the ticket of Pan-Malaysian Islamic Party (PAS) which managed to form the new state government and had Salleh appointed as a Terengganu State Executive Councillor (EXCO). However he did not run again in the 2004 general election due to poor health.

== Later developments ==
Mahathir Mohamad stepped down from the premiership in 2003 and chose Abdullah Ahmad Badawi to be his successor. In 2006, the relationship between the two became less than warm as Mahathir started to criticise the latter's policies. It was during this time when the first serious calls were made for a judicial review of the 1988 crisis. Among the loudest advocates of the review was Tun Salleh Abas himself. The administration however dismissed the calls. A minister in the Prime Minister's Department Nazri Aziz, who was then de facto Law Minister, said that he was not convinced of the need to review the case.

After the 2008 general election which saw heavy losses for BN, Abdullah reshuffled his Cabinet. Within days of his appointment, new de facto Law Minister Zaid Ibrahim stated that the government had to openly apologise for its handling of the crisis, calling it one of his three main goals: "In the eyes of the world, the judicial crisis has weakened our judiciary system." However, he rejected the idea of reviewing the decision: "I am not suggesting that we re-open the case. I am saying that it's clear to everyone, to the world, that serious transgressions had been committed by the previous administration. And I believe that the prime minister is big enough and man enough to say that we had done wrong to these people and we are sorry."

The Bar Council welcomed the proposal. Newly appointed Domestic Trade and Consumer Affairs Minister Shahrir Abdul Samad also voiced support: "The Government has apologised for so many other things to the people, such as the untimely destruction of temples and other issues. So, why not an apology to a former Lord President?"

== Death ==
During the COVID-19 pandemic in Malaysia, on 14 January 2021, Salleh had tested positive for COVID-19 and was admitted to the intensive care unit (ICU) of Sultanah Nur Zahirah Hospital in Kuala Terengganu.

Salleh died from COVID-19-complicated pneumonia at 3.20 a.m. three days later, at the age of 91. He was laid to rest beside the grave of his first wife Toh Puan Azimah Mohd Ali at the Sheikh Ibrahim Muslim Cemetery in Jalan Pusara, Kuala Terengganu.

== Election results ==
Parliament of Malaysia
Year	Constituency	Candidate	Votes	Pct	Opponent(s)	Votes	Pct	Ballots cast	Majority	Turnout
1995	P109 Lembah Pantai	Mohd Salleh Abas (S46)	10,058	29.60%	Shahrizat Abdul Jalil (UMNO)	23,447	68.99%	33,984	13,389	65.22%

Terengganu State Legislative Assembly
Year	Constituency	Candidate	Votes	Pct	Opponent(s)	Votes	Pct	Ballots cast	Majority	Turnout
1999	N03 Jertih	Mohd Salleh Abas (PAS)	5,075	56.20%	Idris Mamat (UMNO)	3,611	39.99%	9,030	1,464	78.58%
1999	N03 Jertih	Mohd Salleh Abas (PAS)	5,075	56.20%	Wan Mohammad Wan Ahmad (IND)	66	0.73%	9,030	1,464	78.58%

== Honours ==
=== Honours of Malaysia ===
- Malaysia
  - Companion of the Order of the Defender of the Realm (JMN) (1966)
  - Commander of the Order of Loyalty to the Crown of Malaysia (PSM) – Tan Sri (1971)
  - Commander of the Order of the Defender of the Realm (PMN) – Tan Sri (1983)
  - Grand Commander of the Order of Loyalty to the Crown of Malaysia (SSM) – Tun (1985)
- Kelantan
  - Recipient of the Order of the Most Distinguished and Most Valiant Warrior (PYGP) (1988)
- Terengganu
  - Companion of the Order of the Crown of Terengganu (SMT) (1963)
  - Knight Commander of the Order of the Crown of Terengganu (DPMT) – Dato' (1968)
  - Knight Grand Commander of the Order of the Crown of Terengganu (SPMT) – Dato' (1983)

== See also ==
- List of deaths due to COVID-19 - notable individual deaths

== Notes and references ==
Preceded by Raja Azlan Shah	Lord President of the Supreme Court; 1984–1988	Succeeded by Abdul Hamid Omar
