= Mohd Husaimi Hussin =

Malaysian politician

Yang Berhormat Tuan Mohd Husaimi Hussin AMN AMT BCM PJK MLA

Deputy Member of the Terengganu State Executive Council (Digital Economy, New Income, Trade, Industry and Green Technology : since 16 August 2023)
- Incumbent
- Assumed office 15 August 2023
- Monarch: Mizan Zainal Abidin
- Menteri Besar: Ahmad Samsuri Mokhtar
- Member: Mohd Nurkhuzaini Ab Rahman
- Preceded by: Muhammad Khalil Abdul Hadi (Trade & Industry); Saiful Azmi Suhaili (Green Technology); Portfolios established (Digital Economy & New Income)
- Constituency: Hulu Besut

Member of the Terengganu State Legislative Assembly for Hulu Besut
- Incumbent
- Assumed office 12 August 2023
- Preceded by: Nawi Mohamad (BN–UMNO)
- Majority: 2,860 (2023)

Personal details
- Born: Mohd Husaimi bin Hussin; 28 May 1974 (age 52) Terengganu, Malaysia
- Party: Malaysian United Indigenous Party (BERSATU)
- Other political affiliations: Perikatan Nasional (PN)
- Occupation: Politician

Mohd Husaimi bin Hussin (born 28 May 1974) is a Malaysian politician who has served as a Deputy Member of the Terengganu State Executive Council (EXCO) in the Perikatan Nasional (PN) administration under Menteri Besar Ahmad Samsuri Mokhtar and Member Mohd Nurkhuzaini Ab Rahman as well as Member of the Terengganu State Legislative Assembly (MLA) for Hulu Besut since August 2023. He is a member of the Malaysian United Indigenous Party (BERSATU), a component party of the PN coalition.

== Election results ==
Terengganu State Legislative Assembly
| Year | Constituency | Candidate | Votes | Pct | Opponent(s) | Votes | Pct | Ballots cast | Majority | Turnout |
|---|---|---|---|---|---|---|---|---|---|---|
| 2023 | N04 Hulu Besut | Mohd Husaimi Hussin (BERSATU) | 9,525 | 58.19% | Nawi Mohamad (UMNO) | 6,665 | 40.71% | 16,553 | 2,860 | 69.42% |
| 2023 | N04 Hulu Besut | Mohd Husaimi Hussin (BERSATU) | 9,525 | 58.19% | Che Harun Kamariah Abdullah (IND) | 180 | 1.10% | 16,553 | 2,860 | 69.42% |

== Honours ==
- Malaysia
  - Member of the Order of the Defender of the Realm (AMN) (2021)
- Malacca
  - Recipient of the Distinguished Service Star (BCM) (2019)
  - Recipient of the Meritorious Service Medal (PJK) (2013)
- Terengganu
  - Member of the Order of the Crown of Terengganu (AMT) (2025)
