= Hulu Besut =

Political subdivision in Malaysia

Hulu Besut (N04)
Terengganu constituency

State constituency
- Legislature: Terengganu State Legislative Assembly
MLA
Mohd Husaimi Hussin
PN
- Constituency created: 1959
- First contested: 1959
- Last contested: 2023

Demographics
- Electors (2023): 23,846

N04 Hulu Besut within Terengganu, as used for the 2023 state election

Hulu Besut is a state constituency in Terengganu, Malaysia, that has been represented in the Terengganu State Legislative Assembly.

The state constituency was first contested in 1959 and is mandated to return a single Assemblyman to the Terengganu State Legislative Assembly under the first-past-the-post voting system.

== Demographics ==
Ethnic breakdown of Hulu Besut's electorate as of 2018
1. Malay (98.8%)
2. Chinese (0.92%)
3. Other ethnicities (0.24%)
4. Indian (0.05%)

== History ==
=== Polling districts ===
According to the Gazette issued on 30 March 2018, the Hulu Besut constituency has a total of 11 polling districts.

State Constituency	Polling Districts	Code	Location
Hulu Besut (N04)	Cerang Meliling	036/04/01	SK Lubuk Kawah
Hulu Besut (N04)	Lubok Kawah	033/04/02	SMA Wataniah
Hulu Besut (N04)	Alur Keladi	033/04/03	SK Alor Keladi
Hulu Besut (N04)	Darau	033/04/04	SK Darau
Hulu Besut (N04)	Pasir Akar	033/04/05	SK Pasir Akar
Hulu Besut (N04)	Padang Bual	033/04/06	Devan Sivik Pasir Akar
Hulu Besut (N04)	Bukit Payung	033/04/07	SK Seri Payong
Hulu Besut (N04)	FELDA Tenang	033/04/08	SK (FELDA) Tenang
Hulu Besut (N04)	Kampung La	033/04/09	SK Kampung La
Hulu Besut (N04)	Hulu Besut	033/04/10	SK Keruak
Hulu Besut (N04)	Kayu Kelat	033/04/11	SK Tanah Merah

=== Representation history ===
Members of the Legislative Assembly for Hulu Besut
Assembly	No	Years	Member	Party
Constituency created
Ulu Besut
1st	N03	1959–1964	Husin Jusoh	PMIP
2nd	N03	1964–1969	Lokman Abdul Kadir	PMIP
		1969–1971	Assembly dissolved	
3rd	N03	1971–1973	Jabir Mohamed Shah	Alliance (UMNO)
3rd	N03	1973–1974	Jabir Mohamed Shah	BN (UMNO)
4th	N04	1974–1978	Hussein Abdullah	BN (UMNO)
5th	N04	1978–1982	Hussein Abdullah	BN (UMNO)
6th	N04	1982–1986	Hussein Abdullah	BN (UMNO)
Hulu Besut
7th	N04	1986–1990	Daud Abu Bakar	BN (UMNO)
8th	N04	1990–1995	Daud Abu Bakar	BN (UMNO)
9th	N04	1995–1999	Yaakub Abd. Kadir	BN (UMNO)
10th	N04	1999–2004	Abdullah Mat Dan	PAS
11th	N04	2004–2008	Nawi Mohamad	BN (UMNO)
12th	N04	2008–2013	Nawi Mohamad	BN (UMNO)
13th	N04	2013–2018	Nawi Mohamad	BN (UMNO)
14th	N04	2018–2023	Nawi Mohamad	BN (UMNO)
15th	N04	2023–present	Mohd Husaimi Hussin	PN (BERSATU)

== Election results ==
Terengganu state election, 2023: Hulu Besut
Party	Candidate	Votes	%	∆%
PAS	Mohd Husaimi Hussin	9,525	58.19	▲15.72
BN	Nawi Mohamad	6,665	40.71	▼11.26
Independent	Che Harun Kamariah	180	1.10	▲1.10
Total valid votes		16,370	100.00	
Total rejected ballots		167		
Unreturned ballots		16		
Turnout		16,553	69.35	▼14.65
Registered electors		23,846		
Majority		2,860	17.48	▲7.98
PAS gain from BN		Swing		?

Terengganu state election, 2018: Hulu Besut
Party	Candidate	Votes	%	∆%
BN	Nawi Mohamad	8,045	51.97	▼3.56
PAS	Mat Daik Mohamad	6,576	42.47	▼2.00
PKR	Ismail Abdul Kadir	860	5.56	▲5.56
Total valid votes		15,481	100.00	
Total rejected ballots		209		
Unreturned ballots		98		
Turnout		15,788	83.97	▼4.05
Registered electors		18,803		
Majority		1,469	9.49	▼1.57
BN hold		Swing		

Terengganu state election, 2013: Hulu Besut
Party	Candidate	Votes	%	∆%
BN	Nawi Mohamad	7,884	55.53	▼5.59
PAS	Salahhudin Jaafar	6,314	44.47	▲5.59
Total valid votes		14,198	100.00	
Total rejected ballots		170		
Unreturned ballots		57		
Turnout		14,425	88.01	▲3.13
Registered electors		16,390		
Majority		1,570	11.06	▼11.19
BN hold		Swing		

Terengganu state election, 2008: Hulu Besut
Party	Candidate	Votes	%	∆%
BN	Nawi Mohamad	6,740	61.12	▼1.59
PAS	Mohd Zin Hassan	4,287	38.88	▲1.59
Total valid votes		11,027	100.00	
Total rejected ballots		147		
Unreturned ballots		0		
Turnout		11,174	84.88	▼2.63
Registered electors		13,165		
Majority		2,453	22.25	▼3.17
BN hold		Swing		

Terengganu state election, 2004: Hulu Besut
Party	Candidate	Votes	%	∆%
BN	Nawi Mohamad	6,496	62.71	▲16.17
PAS	Abdullah Mat Adam	3,863	37.29	▼16.17
Total valid votes		10,359	100.00	
Total rejected ballots		152		
Unreturned ballots		8		
Turnout		10,519	87.51	▲6.54
Registered electors		12,021		
Majority		2,633	25.42	▲18.50
BN gain from PAS		Swing		?

Terengganu state election, 1999: Hulu Besut
Party	Candidate	Votes	%	∆%
PAS	Abdullah Mat Adam	4,619	53.46	▲8.28
BN	Nawi Mohamad	4,021	46.54▼8.28	
Total valid votes		8,640	100.00	
Total rejected ballots		218		
Unreturned ballots		45		
Turnout		8,903	80.97	▼1.51
Registered electors		10,996		
Majority		598	6.92	▼2.72
PAS gain from BN		Swing		?

Terengganu state election, 1995: Hulu Besut
Party	Candidate	Votes	%	∆%
BN	Yaakub Abd Kadir	4,668	54.82	▲1.50
PAS	Abdul Rahman Ab Kadir	3,847	45.18	▼1.50
Total valid votes		8,515	100.00	
Total rejected ballots		204		
Unreturned ballots		14		
Turnout		8,733	82.48	▼3.11
Registered electors		10,588		
Majority		821	9.64	▲2.99
BN hold		Swing		

Terengganu state election, 1990: Hulu Besut
Party	Candidate	Votes	%	∆%
BN	Ahmad Bakar @ Daud Abu Bakar	4,123	53.32	▼2.49
PAS	Daud Abd Kadir	3,609	46.68	▲2.49
Total valid votes		7,732	100.00	
Total rejected ballots		193		
Unreturned ballots		7		
Turnout		7,932	85.59	▲2.46
Registered electors		9,267		
Majority		514	6.65	▼4.98
BN hold		Swing		

Terengganu state election, 1986: Hulu Besut
Party	Candidate	Votes	%	∆%
BN	Ahmad Bakar @ DaudAbu Bakar	3,412	55.82	▼1.00
PAS	Husain Awang	2,701	44.18	▲1.99
Total valid votes		6,113	100.00	
Total rejected ballots		286		
Unreturned ballots		0		
Turnout		6,399	83.14	▲0.52
Registered electors		7,697		
Majority		711	11.63	▼2.99
BN hold		Swing		

Terengganu state election, 1982: Ulu Besut
Party	Candidate	Votes	%	∆%
BN	Husin Abdullah @ Mat Hassan Abdullah	4,209	56.82	▲1.49
PAS	Husin Jusoh	3,126	42.20	▼2.48
Independent	Lua Cheong Eng @ Lua Byeo Cheong	73	0.99	▲0.99
Total valid votes		7,408	100.00	
Total rejected ballots		163		
Unreturned ballots		0		
Turnout		7,571	82.62	▲2.41
Registered electors		9,164		
Majority		1,083	14.62	▲3.97
BN hold		Swing		

Terengganu state election, 1978: Ulu Besut
Party	Candidate	Votes	%	∆%
BN	Husin Abdullah @ Mat Hassan Abdullah	3,149	55.32	▼22.18
PAS	Abd. Latif Mohamad	2,543	44.68	▲44.68
Total valid votes		5,692	100.00	
Total rejected ballots		305		
Unreturned ballots		0		
Turnout		5,997	80.21	▲6.91
Registered electors		7,477		
Majority		606	10.65	▼46.41
BN hold		Swing		

Terengganu state election, 1974: Ulu Besut
Party	Candidate	Votes	%	∆%
BN	Husin Abdullah @ Mat Hassan Abdullah	3,768	77.50	▲26.47
Parti Sosialis Rakyat Malaysia	Daud Abd Kadir	994	20.44	▲20.44
Independent	Lua Cheong Eng @ Lua Byeo Cheong	100	2.06	▲2.06
Total valid votes		4,862	100.00	
Total rejected ballots		155		
Unreturned ballots		0		
Turnout		5,017	73.29	▼3.11
Registered electors		6,845		
Majority		2,774	57.05	▲55.00
BN gain from Alliance		Swing		-

Terengganu state election, 1969: Ulu Besut
Party	Candidate	Votes	%	∆%
Alliance	Jabir Mohd. Shah	2,862	51.03	▲8.43
PMIP	Lukman Abdul Kadir	2,747	48.97	▼0.70
Total valid votes		5,609	100.00	
Total rejected ballots		356		
Unreturned ballots		0		
Turnout		5,965	76.41	▼5.48
Registered electors		7,807		
Majority		115	2.05	▼5.02
Alliance gain from PMIP		Swing		-

Terengganu state election, 1964: Ulu Besut
Party	Candidate	Votes	%	∆%
PMIP	Lukman Abdul Kadir	2,205	49.67	▼4.17
Alliance	Wan Abdul Latif Wan Abdul Kadir	1,891	42.60	▲27.27
Socialist Front	Ibrahim Ismail	343	7.73	▼17.01
Total valid votes		4,439	100.00	
Total rejected ballots		282		
Unreturned ballots		0		
Turnout		4,721	81.89	▲11.56
Registered electors		5,765		
Majority		314	7.07	▼22.03
PMIP hold		Swing		

Terengganu state election, 1959: Ulu Besut
Party	Candidate	Votes	%
PMIP	Husin Jusoh	1,528	53.84
Socialist Front	Ibrahim Ismail	702	24.74
Alliance	Zainal Abidin Mohamed Amin	435	15.33
National Party	Mohd. Fauzi Hussain	173	6.10
Total valid votes		2,838	100.00
Total rejected ballots		116	
Unreturned ballots		0	
Turnout		2,954	70.33
Registered electors		4,200	
Majority		826	29.11
This was a new constituency created.
