= Kota Putera =

Political subdivision in Malaysia

Kota Putera (N02)
Terengganu constituency

State constituency
- Legislature: Terengganu State Legislative Assembly
MLA
Nur Khuzaini Abdul Rahman
PN
- Constituency created: 2003
- First contested: 2004
- Last contested: 2023

Demographics
- Electors (2023): 32,792

N02 Kota Putera within Terengganu, as used for the 2023 state election

Kota Putera is a state constituency in Terengganu, Malaysia, that has been represented in the Terengganu State Legislative Assembly.

The state constituency was first contested in 2004 and is mandated to return a single Assemblyman to the Terengganu State Legislative Assembly under the first-past-the-post voting system.

== Demographics ==
Ethnic breakdown of Kota Putera's electorate as of 2018
1. Malay (98.8%)
2. Chinese (0.62%)
3. Other ethnicities (0.54%)
4. Indian (0.06%)

== History ==
=== Polling districts ===
According to the Gazette issued on 30 March 2018, the Kota Putera constituency has a total of 12 polling districts.

State Constituency	Polling Districts	Code	Location
Kota Putera (N02)	Pekan Seberang Kastam	033/02/01	SK Pengkalan Nyireh
Kota Putera (N02)	Pengkalan Nyireh	033/02/02	SMK Permaisuri Nur Zahirah
Kota Putera (N02)	Kampung Raja Utara	033/02/03	SMK Kampong Raja
Kota Putera (N02)	Kampung Raja Selatan	033/02/04	SMA Maarif
Kota Putera (N02)	Keluang	033/02/05	SK Keluang
Kota Putera (N02)	Batu Tumbuh	033/02/06	SK Tengku Mahmud
Kota Putera (N02)	Amir	033/02/07	SK Amer
Kota Putera (N02)	Gong Bayur	033/02/08	SK Tengku Mahmud 2
Kota Putera (N02)	Tembila	033/02/09	SK Tembila
Kota Putera (N02)	Beting Lintang	033/02/10	SK Beting Linang
Kota Putera (N02)	Alur Lintang	033/02/11	SMK Nasiruddin Shah
Kota Putera (N02)	Gelam Mas	033/02/12	Kolej Vokesional Besut

=== Representation history ===
Members of the Legislative Assembly for Kota Putera
Assembly	No	Years	Member	Party
Constituency created from Kampung Raja and Jertih
11th	N02	2004–2008	Wan Mohd Wan Hassan	BN (UMNO)
12th	N02	2008–2013	Muhammad Pehimi Yusof	BN (UMNO)
13th	N02	2013–2018	Mohd Mahdi Musa	BN (UMNO)
14th	N02	2018–2020	Mohd. Nurkhuzaini Ab. Rahman	PAS
14th	N02	2020–2023	Mohd. Nurkhuzaini Ab. Rahman	PN (PAS)
15th	N02	2023–present	Mohd. Nurkhuzaini Ab. Rahman	PN (PAS)

== Election results ==
Terengganu state election, 2023: Kota Putera
Party	Candidate	Votes	%	∆%
PAS	Mohd. Nurkhuzaini Ab. Rahman	13,360	58.31	▲9.13
BN	Muhammad Pehimi Yusof	9,551	41.69	▼1.51
Total valid votes		22,911	100.00	
Total rejected ballots		130		
Unreturned ballots		35		
Turnout		23,076	70.37	▼13.13
Registered electors		32,792		
Majority		3,809	16.62	▲10.64
PAS hold		Swing		

Terengganu state election, 2018: Kota Putera
Party	Candidate	Votes	%	∆%
PAS	Mohd. Nurkhuzaini Ab. Rahman	9,704	49.18	▲3.56
BN	Mohd Mahdi Musa	8,523	43.20	▼10.82
PKR	Tengku Roslan Tengku Othman @ Tengku Ramli	1,504	7.62	▲7.27
Total valid votes		19,731	100.00	
Total rejected ballots		283		
Unreturned ballots		166		
Turnout		20,180	83.45	▼3.18
Registered electors		24,182		
Majority		1,181	5.99	▼2.41
PAS gain from BN		Swing		?

Terengganu state election, 2013: Kota Putera
Party	Candidate	Votes	%	∆%
BN	Mohd Mahdi Musa	9,084	54.02	▼8.95
PAS	Adam Mat Said	7,672	45.62	▲45.62
PKR	Mohamed Abdul Ghani Ibrahim	60	0.36	▼36.68
Total valid votes		16,816	100.00	
Total rejected ballots		206		
Unreturned ballots		67		
Turnout		17,089	86.63	▲2.62
Registered electors		19,727		
Majority		1,412	8.40	▼17.54
BN hold		Swing		

Terengganu state election, 2008: Kota Putera
Party	Candidate	Votes	%	∆%
BN	Muhammad Pehimi Yusof	8,090	62.97	▲4.43
PKR	Che Mohamad Mohd. Amin	4,758	37.03	▲37.03
Total valid votes		12,848	100.00	
Total rejected ballots		166		
Unreturned ballots		57		
Turnout		13,071	84.01	▼2.63
Registered electors		15,559		
Majority		3,332	25.93	▲8.86
BN hold		Swing		

Terengganu state election, 2004: Kota Putera
Party	Candidate	Votes	%
BN	W Mohd Wan Hassan	6,903	58.53
PAS	Abd Rahman	4,890	41.47
Total valid votes		11,793	100.00
Total rejected ballots		172	
Unreturned ballots		38	
Turnout		12,003	86.64
Registered electors		13,854	
Majority		2,013	17.07
This was a new constituency created.
