= Jertih (state constituency) =

Political subdivision in Malaysia

Jertih (N03)
Terengganu constituency

State constituency
- Legislature: Terengganu State Legislative Assembly
MLA
Riduan Mohd Nor
PN
- Constituency created: 1984
- First contested: 1986
- Last contested: 2023

Demographics
- Electors (2023): 29,088

N03 Jertih within Terengganu, as used for the 2023 state election

Jertih is a state constituency in Terengganu, Malaysia, that has been represented in the Terengganu State Legislative Assembly.

The state constituency was first contested in 1986 and is mandated to return a single Assemblyman to the Terengganu State Legislative Assembly under the first-past-the-post voting system

== Demographics ==
Ethnic breakdown of Jertih's electorate as of 2018
1. Malay (96.2%)
2. Chinese (3.33%)
3. Other ethnicities (0.35%)
4. Indian (0.14%)

== History ==
=== Polling Districts ===
According to the Gazette issued on 30 March 2018, the Jertih constituency has a total of 13 polling districts.

| State Constituency | Polling Districts | Code | Location |
|---|---|---|---|
| Jertih (N03) | Kubang Bemban | 033/03/01 | Balai Raya Kg. Tok Donik |
| Jertih (N03) | Alur Lintah | 033/03/02 | SK Alor Lintah |
| Jertih (N03) | Tok Raja | 033/03/03 | SK Tok Raja |
| Jertih (N03) | Bukit Kenak | 033/03/04 | SK Bukit Kenak |
| Jertih (N03) | Gong Nering | 033/03/05 | SMK Seri Nering |
| Jertih (N03) | Simpang Tiga Jertih | 033/03/06 | SK Pusat Jerteh |
| Jertih (N03) | Bandar Jertih | 033/03/07 | SJK (C) Chung Hwa |
| Jertih (N03) | Seberang Jertih | 033/03/08 | SK Seberang Jerteh |
| Jertih (N03) | Padang Luas | 033/03/09 | SK Padang Luas |
| Jertih (N03) | Padang Landak | 033/03/10 | SK Padang Landak |
| Jertih (N03) | Nyiur Tujuh | 033/03/11 | SK Nyiur Tujuh |
| Jertih (N03) | Gong Gucil | 033/03/12 | SK Tanah Merah |
| Jertih (N03) | Pelagat | 033/03/13 | SMK Pelagat |

=== Representation history ===
Members of the Legislative Assembly for Jertih
| Assembly | No | Years | Members | Party |
Constituency created from Bukit Kenak, Ulu Besut, Kampong Raja and Kuala Besut
| 7th | N03 | 1986–1990 | Abdul Majid Muhammad | BN (UMNO) |
| 8th | N03 | 1990–1995 | Abdul Latif Mohamad | PAS |
| 9th | N03 | 1995–1999 | Idris Mamat | BN (UMNO) |
| 10th | N03 | 1999–2004 | Salleh Abas | PAS |
| 11th | N03 | 2004–2008 | Idris Jusoh | BN (UMNO) |
| 12th | N03 | 2008–2013 | Idris Jusoh | BN (UMNO) |
| 13th | N03 | 2013–2018 | Muhammad Pehimi Yusof | BN (UMNO) |
| 14th | N03 | 2018–2023 | Muhammad Pehimi Yusof | BN (UMNO) |
| 15th | N03 | 2023–present | Riduan Mohd Nor | PN (PAS) |

== Election results ==
Terengganu state election, 2023
| Party | Candidate | Votes | % | ∆% |
|---|---|---|---|---|
| PAS | Riduan Mohd Nor | 12,122 | 62.10 | ▲19.83 |
| BN | Mohd Rozaini Md Rasli | 7,399 | 37.90 | ▼11.26 |
| Total valid votes | | 19,521 | 100.00 | |
| Total rejected ballots | | 169 | | |
| Unreturned ballots | | 24 | | |
| Turnout | | 19,714 | 67.77 | ▼14.63 |
| Registered electors | | 29,088 | | |
| Majority | | 4,723 | 24.20 | ▲17.31 |
| PAS gain from BN | | Swing | | ? |

Terengganu state election, 2018
| Party | Candidate | Votes | % | ∆% |
|---|---|---|---|---|
| BN | Muhammad Pehimi Yusof | 9,143 | 49.16 | ▼3.77 |
| PAS | Wan Azhar Wan Ahmad | 7,862 | 42.27 | ▼4.80 |
| PKR | Kamaruzaman Wan Su | 1,594 | 8.57 | ▲8.57 |
| Total valid votes | | 18,499 | 100.00 | |
| Total rejected ballots | | 226 | | |
| Unreturned ballots | | 130 | | |
| Turnout | | 18,855 | 82.41 | ▼3.35 |
| Registered electors | | 22,880 | | |
| Majority | | 1,381 | 7.47 | ▲1.60 |
| BN hold | | Swing | | |

Terengganu state election, 2013
| Party | Candidate | Votes | % | ∆% |
|---|---|---|---|---|
| BN | Muhammad Pehimi Yusof | 8,396 | 52.93 | ▼8.99 |
| PAS | Wan Azhar Wan Ahmad | 7,466 | 47.07 | ▲8.99 |
| Total valid votes | | 15,862 | 100.00 | |
| Total rejected ballots | | 172 | | |
| Unreturned ballots | | 63 | | |
| Turnout | | 16,097 | 85.76 | ▲1.92 |
| Registered electors | | 18,770 | | |
| Majority | | 930 | 5.86 | ▼17.97 |
| BN hold | | Swing | | |

Terengganu state election, 2008
| Party | Candidate | Votes | % | ∆% |
|---|---|---|---|---|
| BN | Idris Jusoh | 7,912 | 61.92 | ▲2.60 |
| PAS | Muhammad Hassan Salleh | 4,866 | 38.08 | ▼2.60 |
| Total valid votes | | 12,778 | 100.00 | |
| Total rejected ballots | | 144 | | |
| Unreturned ballots | | 31 | | |
| Turnout | | 12,953 | 83.84 | ▼1.48 |
| Registered electors | | 15,449 | | |
| Majority | | 3,046 | 23.84 | ▲5.19 |
| BN hold | | Swing | | |

Terengganu state election, 2004
| Party | Candidate | Votes | % | ∆% |
|---|---|---|---|---|
| BN | Idris Jusoh | 6,513 | 59.32 | ▲18.06 |
| PAS | Mohd Hassan Salleh | 4,466 | 40.68 | ▼17.31 |
| Total valid votes | | 10,979 | 100.00 | |
| Total rejected ballots | | 140 | | |
| Unreturned ballots | | 14 | | |
| Turnout | | 11,133 | 85.32 | ▲6.75 |
| Registered electors | | 13,048 | | |
| Majority | | 2,047 | 18.64 | ▲1.92 |
| BN gain from PAS | | Swing | | ? |

Terengganu state election, 1999
| Party | Candidate | Votes | % | ∆% |
|---|---|---|---|---|
| PAS | Mohd Salleh Abas | 5,075 | 57.99 | ▲13.33 |
| BN | Idris Mamat | 3,611 | 41.26 | ▼14.09 |
| Independent | Wan Mohammad Wan Ahmad | 66 | 0.75 | ▲0.75 |
| Total valid votes | | 8,752 | 100.00 | |
| Total rejected ballots | | 214 | | |
| Unreturned ballots | | 64 | | |
| Turnout | | 9,030 | 78.58 | ▼0.30 |
| Registered electors | | 11,492 | | |
| Majority | | 1,464 | 16.73 | ▲6.04 |
| PAS gain from BN | | Swing | | ? |

Terengganu state election, 1995
| Party | Candidate | Votes | % | ∆% |
|---|---|---|---|---|
| BN | Idris Mamat | 4,742 | 55.35 | ▲9.00 |
| PAS | Abd. Latif Mohamad | 3,826 | 44.65 | ▼9.00 |
| Total valid votes | | 8,568 | 100.00 | |
| Total rejected ballots | | 199 | | |
| Unreturned ballots | | 47 | | |
| Turnout | | 8,814 | 78.88 | ▼3.33 |
| Registered electors | | 11,174 | | |
| Majority | | 916 | 10.69 | ▲3.38 |
| BN gain from PAS | | Swing | | - |

Terengganu state election, 1990
| Party | Candidate | Votes | % | ∆% |
|---|---|---|---|---|
| PAS | Abd. Latif Mohamad | 4,382 | 53.65 | ▲13.63 |
| BN | Abdul Majid Ahmad | 3,785 | 46.35 | ▼13.63 |
| Total valid votes | | 8,167 | 100.00 | |
| Total rejected ballots | | 207 | | |
| Unreturned ballots | | 16 | | |
| Turnout | | 8,390 | 82.21 | ▲4.89 |
| Registered electors | | 10,206 | | |
| Majority | | 597 | 7.31 | ▼12.63 |
| PAS gain from BN | | Swing | | - |

Terengganu state election, 1986
| Party | Candidate | Votes | % |
|---|---|---|---|
| BN | Abdul Majid Mohamed @ Ahmad | 4,009 | 59.97 |
| PAS | Daud bAbd Kadir | 2,676 | 40.03 |
| Total valid votes | | 6,685 | 100.00 |
| Total rejected ballots | | 237 | |
| Unreturned ballots | | 0 | |
| Turnout | | 6,922 | 77.31 |
| Registered electors | | 8,953 | |
| Majority | | 1,333 | 19.94 |
This was a new constituency created.
