= Idris Jusoh =

Malaysian politician

Yang Berbahagia Tan Sri Dato' Seri Haji Idris Jusoh PSM SSMZ DPMT PJK
- إدريس جوسوه

Minister of Higher Education
- In office 29 July 2015 – 9 May 2018
- Monarchs: Abdul Halim (2015–2016); Muhammad V (2016–2018)
- Prime Minister: Najib Razak
- Deputy: Mary Yap Kain Ching
- Preceded by: Himself (Minister of Education II)
- Succeeded by: Maszlee Malik (Minister of Education)
- Constituency: Besut

Minister of Education II
- In office 16 May 2013 – 29 July 2015 Serving with Muhyiddin Yassin
- Monarch: Abdul Halim
- Prime Minister: Najib Razak
- Deputy: Kamalanathan Panchanathan; Mary Yap Kain Ching
- Preceded by: Mohamed Khaled Nordin (Minister of Higher Education)
- Succeeded by: Himself (Minister of Higher Education)
- Constituency: Besut

12th Menteri Besar of Terengganu
- In office 25 March 2004 – 25 March 2008
- Monarch: Mizan Zainal Abidin
- Preceded by: Abdul Hadi Awang
- Succeeded by: Ahmad Said
- Constituency: Jertih

Chairman of the Federal Land Development Authority
- In office 1 May 2020 – 30 June 2023
- Monarch: Abdullah
- Prime Minister: Muhyiddin Yassin (2020–2021); Ismail Sabri Yaakob (2021–2022); Anwar Ibrahim (2022–2023)
- Minister: Mustapa Mohamed (2020–2022); Rafizi Ramli (2022–2023)
- Director General: Othman Omar (2020); Amiruddin Abdul Satar (2020–2023)
- Preceded by: Mohd Bakke Salleh
- Succeeded by: Ahmad Shabery Cheek

Chairman of the Majlis Amanah Rakyat
- In office 17 July 2008 – 9 March 2013
- Monarchs: Mizan Zainal Abidin (2008–2011); Abdul Halim (2011–2013)
- Prime Minister: Abdullah Ahmad Badawi (2008–2009); Najib Razak (2009–2013)
- Minister: Muhammad Muhammad Taib (2008–2009); Shafie Apdal (2009–2013)
- Chief Executive Officer: Nam Marthinin; Ibrahim Ahmad
- Preceded by: Abdul Hamid Zainal Abidin
- Succeeded by: Annuar Musa

Member of the Malaysian Parliament for Besut
- In office 5 May 2013 – 19 November 2022
- Preceded by: Abdullah Md Zin (BN–UMNO)
- Succeeded by: Che Mohamad Zulkifly Jusoh (PN–PAS)
- Majority: 8,342 (2013); 4,599 (2018)
- In office 24 April 1995 – 29 April 1999
- Preceded by: Mohamed Yusof Mohamed Noor (BN–UMNO)
- Succeeded by: Hassan Mohamed (PAS)
- Majority: 4,507 (1995)

Member of the Terengganu State Legislative Assembly for Jertih
- In office 21 March 2004 – 5 May 2013
- Preceded by: Mohd Salleh Abas (PAS)
- Succeeded by: Muhammad Pehimi Yusof (BN–UMNO)
- Majority: 2,047 (2004); 3,046 (2008)

Faction represented in Dewan Rakyat
- 1995–1999: Barisan Nasional
- 2013–2022: Barisan Nasional

Faction represented in Terengganu State Legislative Assembly
- 2004–2013: Barisan Nasional

Personal details
- Born: Idris bin Jusoh; 15 November 1955 (age 70) Kampung Tok Has, Jertih, Besut, Terengganu, Federation of Malaya (now Malaysia)
- Citizenship: Malaysian
- Party: United Malay National Organisation (UMNO)
- Other political affiliations: Barisan Nasional (BN)
- Spouse: Che Kamariah Zakaria
- Education: Sekolah Tuanku Abdul Rahman; Universiti Sains Malaysia; Aston University; University of New Haven; University of Jordan; Harvard University
- Website: www.idrisjusoh.com

Tan Sri Dato' Seri Haji Idris bin Jusoh (Jawi: إدريس بن جوسوه; born 15 November 1955) is a Malaysian politician who served as Chairman of the Federal Land Development Authority (FELDA) from May 2020 to June 2023, the Minister of Higher Education and Minister of Education II in the Barisan Nasional (BN) administration under former Prime Minister Najib Razak from May 2013 to the collapse of the BN administration in May 2018. He also served as the 12th Menteri Besar of Terengganu from March 2004 to March 2008, Member of Parliament (MP) for Besut from May 2013 to November 2022, Member of the Terengganu State Legislative Assembly (MLA) for Jertih from March 2004 to May 2013 and Chairman of the Majlis Amanah Rakyat (MARA) from July 2008 to March 2013. He is a member of the United Malays National Organisation (UMNO), a component party of the BN coalition.

== Early life ==
Idris Jusoh or popularly known as "Yeh" (Yeh is just a shortform for Idris, most Kelantanese call people with the name Idris as Yeh and Jertih, at least according to some folklores, used to belong to Kelantan) attended elite school (STAR) from 1968 to 1973.

Yeh was in Green House. He was a school prefect too. He was sent to Australia for matriculation even before the MCE (SPM) results were known.

He came back to Malaysia before completing his studies in Australia because his father died. Later on he attended USM and was at one time USM's "overall best student".

Yeh became famous when he won Terengganu for Barisan Nasional from PAS in 2004 and he became the state MB. PAS, the incumbent party, won only 4 seats while Idris-led BN conquered 28.

He was MARA chairman until his recent appointment as Minister of Education II. Yeh is married to Che Kamariah Zakaria whom he met in USM.

== Education background ==
- Primary: SK Seberang Jerteh, Terengganu (1962–1968)
- Secondary: Sekolah Tuanku Abdul Rahman (STAR) Ipoh (1968–1973)
- Blackburn High School, Victoria, Australia (1974)
- Bachelor in Social Sciences (Economics), Universiti Sains Malaysia (1980)
- Entrepreneurship Course, University of Aston, England (1984)
- Masters in Business Administration (MBA) (Finance), University of New Haven, USA (1988)
- Arabic language studies, University of Jordan (1994)
- Advanced Management Programme, INSEAD, France (2008)
- "Leaders In Developing Countries" Programme - Harvard Kennedy School of Executive Education, Massachusetts, USA (2009)

== Political career ==
=== Positions Held ===
==== Government/Private ====
- Minister of Higher Education (July 2015 – 2018)
- Minister of Education II (May 2013 – July 2015)
- Chairman of MARA (August 2008 – April 2013)
- Chief Minister of Terengganu (2004 – 2008)
- Terengganu State Assemblyman (Constituency of Jerteh) (2004–2013)
- Chairman, Board of Directors Ketengah (2000–2008)
- Deputy Minister, Ministry of Entrepreneurial Development (1995–1999)
- Besut Member of Parliament (1995 – 1999) (2013 –present)
- MARA council member (1991 – 1993)
- Managing Director, Jusoh Enterprise (1988 – 1995)
- Managing Director, Jusoh Sawmill (1980–1986)

==== Politics ====
- UMNO Supreme Council Member (2000–2018)
- Chairman of Coordination Council, UMNO Negeri Terengganu (2004–2008)
- Chairman of Barisan Nasional Terengganu Committee (2004–2008)
- Division Chief, UMNO Besut (2000 – 2013)
- Division Youth Chief, UMNO Terengganu (1992–1993)
- Division Youth Chief, UMNO Besut (1985–1995)

=== Terengganu ===
Following the 2008 Malaysian general election, Barisan Nasional managed to win a majority in the Terengganu state election, garnering 24 out of 32 state seats on offer, with PAS winning the remaining 8 seats.

In the formation of the new Terengganu state government, the federal government under the then Prime Minister Abdullah Ahmad Badawi recommended Idris Jusoh as Menteri Besar, who received full support of twenty-three of the 24 Barisan Nasional state assemblymen elected.

A crisis soon ensued after the Sultan of Terengganu, Mizan Zainal Abidin, who is also the Yang di-Pertuan Agong (Supreme Ruler) of Malaysia, refused to re-appoint and swear in Idris as Menteri Besar. On 22 March 2008, the office of the Sultan of Terengganu announced the appointment of Kijal assemblyman Ahmad Said instead of Idris Jusoh.

The Prime Minister responded by saying that the appointment of Ahmad Said was unconstitutional as it went against the wishes of the assemblymen and the Prime Minister's office who have supported Idris Jusoh candidacy for Menteri Besar. The 22 other BN assemblymen had also pledged their support toward the appointment of Idris Jusoh according to Deputy Prime Minister Najib Tun Razak. Ahmad Said was given warning that he would be stripped of his UMNO membership "for disobeying the party's leadership". However he was not stripped of his UMNO membership.

On 26 March 2008, Prime Minister Abdullah Ahmad Badawi and Sultan Mizan Zainal Abidin met at Istana Negara to resolve the impasse. The Prime Minister accepted the King's appointment of Ahmad Said as Menteri Besar of Terengganu. He also apologised to the King for the public spat over the appointment of the menteri besar, explaining that there was no intention to disparage or humiliate the royal household. This apparent backdown was due to threat that the royal household would be prepared to dissolve the state assembly if there had been a motion of no-confidence against Ahmad Said by the 22 Umno state assemblymen.

The crisis was one of the only royal interventions in Malaysia in recent times.

On 10 September 2013, referring to the National Education Blueprint, he made a highlight in the news by saying this in a forum in Sabah, "If some people feel the system is not good and want to send their children overseas to study, the government cannot stop them. But the Ministry will work towards improving the country's education system."

On 21 February 2015, he declared that Malaysia's higher education is now on par with those of developed nations including the United Kingdom, Germany and Australia, said Second Education Minister Datuk Seri Idris Jusoh. He said this was proven by the fact that 135,000 foreign students made up 10% of students at national higher educational institutions in the country. This statement was largely criticized due to its over optimism. On 24 February 2015, Idris released an article entitled "What it Means to be World Class" to explain the statement as well as other education matters.

== Social contributions ==
- Global Sciences and Innovation Advisory Council (GSIAC) member (2013 – present)
- Member, Bumiputera Agenda Action Council (MTAB) -(February 2011– present)
- Member, Pahang State Economic Advisory Council (2012– present)
- Deputy Chairman, UMNO Malaysia Economic Bureau (2008–present)
- Member, Yayasan IQRA Board of Trustees (2011 – present)
- Chairman, 4th Bumiputera Economic Congress (1999)
- Chairman, Tunku Abdul Rahman Foundation (2012-sekarang)
- Founder, MIND Centre (Mindset), Besut (2008)
- Founder, IMTIAZ schools & Board of Trustees (1999)
- Founder, Pintar Quran Board of Directors (1994)
- Founder, Ulul Albab Programme (2006)
- Founder, Fulbright Scholars English Teaching Assistants Programme (2006)

== Awards ==
- President of the USM Students Council (1978–1979)
- Gold Medal Award Recipient for being Best Student in USM (1980)
- President of the International Student Association in University New Haven, USA (1987)
- Best Club Award, Youth Entrepreneurship Clubs (1994)
- Special Appreciation Award : Individual Malaysian Franchise Award (2000/2001)

== Election results ==
Terengganu State Legislative Assembly
Year	Constituency	Candidate	Votes	Pct	Opponent(s)	Votes	Pct	Ballots cast	Majority	Turnout
1999	N02 Kampung Raja	Idris Jusoh (UMNO)	4,389	46.26%	Abd Rahman @ Abdul Aziz Abas (PAS)	5,099	53.74%	9,647	710	81.95%
2004	N03 Jertih	Idris Jusoh (UMNO)	6,513	59.32%	Mohd Hassan Salleh (PAS)	4,466	40.68%	11,113	2,047	85.32%
2008	N03 Jertih	Idris Jusoh (UMNO)	7,912	61.99%	Muhammad Hassan Salleh (PAS)	4,866	38.08%	12,953	3,046	83.84%

Parliament of Malaysia
Year	Constituency	Candidate	Votes	Pct	Opponent(s)	Votes	Pct	Ballots cast	Majority	Turnout
1995	P033 Besut	Idris Jusoh (UMNO)	19,294	56.61%	Zakaria @ Ibrahim Abdul Rahman (S46)	14,787	43.39%	35,437	4,507	81.37%
2013	P033 Besut	Idris Jusoh (UMNO)	35,232	56.71%	Riduan Mohamad Nor (PAS)	26,890	43.29%	63,017	8,342	86.84%
2018	P033 Besut	Idris Jusoh (UMNO)	34,335	48.40%	Riduan Mohamad Nor (PAS)	29,736	41.92%	72,323	4,599	83.49%
2018	P033 Besut	Idris Jusoh (UMNO)	34,335	48.40%	Wan Nazari Wan Jusoh (BERSATU)	6,864	9.68%	72,323	4,599	83.49%

== Honours ==
- Malaysia
  - Commander of the Order of Loyalty to the Crown of Malaysia (PSM) – Tan Sri (2022)
  - Recipient of the 13th Yang di-Pertuan Agong Installation Medal
  - Recipient of the 15th Yang di-Pertuan Agong Installation Medal
- Terengganu
  - Knight Grand Companion of the Order of Sultan Mizan Zainal Abidin of Terengganu (SSMZ) – Dato' Seri (2004)
  - Knight Commander of the Order of the Crown of Terengganu (DPMT) – Dato' (1998)
  - Meritorious Service Medal (PJK) (1994)

== See also ==
- Besut (federal constituency)

Preceded by Abdul Hadi Awang	Menteri Besar of Terengganu; 25 March 2004 – 25 March 2008	Succeeded by Ahmad Said
