= Permaisuri =

Political subdivision in Malaysia

Permaisuri (N06)
Terengganu constituency

State constituency
- Legislature: Terengganu State Legislative Assembly
MLA
Mohd Yusop Majid
PN
- Constituency created: 1984
- First contested: 1986
- Last contested: 2023

Demographics
- Electors (2023): 30,739

N06 Permaisuri within Terengganu, as used for the 2023 state election

Permaisuri is a state constituency in Terengganu, Malaysia, that has been represented in the Terengganu State Legislative Assembly.

The state constituency was first contested in 1986 and is mandated to return a single Assemblyman to the Terengganu State Legislative Assembly under the first-past-the-post voting system.

== Demographics ==
Ethnic breakdown of Permaisuri's electorate as of 2018
1. Malay (99.3%)
2. Chinese (0.48%)
3. Other ethnicities (0.21%)
4. Indian (0.03%)

== History ==
=== Polling districts ===
According to the Gazette issued on 30 March 2018, the Permaisuri constituency has a total of 16 polling districts.

State Constituency	Polling Districts	Code	Location
Permaisuri (N06)	Gong Batu	034/06/01	SK Kuala Setiu
Permaisuri (N06)	Bintang	034/06/02	SK Bintang
Permaisuri (N06)	Fikri	034/06/03	SK Kampung Fikri
Permaisuri (N06)	Mangkuk	034/06/04	SK Mangkok
Permaisuri (N06)	Guntung Dalam	034/06/05	SK Guntong
Permaisuri (N06)	Guntung Luar	034/06/06	SMK Guntong
Permaisuri (N06)	Kampung Besut	034/06/07	SK Campong Besut
Permaisuri (N06)	Permaisuri	034/06/08	SK Kampung Buloh
Permaisuri (N06)	Putera Jaya	034/06/09	SK Putera Jaya
Permaisuri (N06)	Banggul	034/06/10	SK Banggol
Permaisuri (N06)	Penarik	034/06/11	SMK Penarek
Permaisuri (N06)	Bari	034/06/12	SK Bari
Permaisuri (N06)	Telaga Papan	034/06/13	SK Telaga Papan
Permaisuri (N06)	Merang	034/06/14	SK Merang
Permaisuri (N06)	Rhu Sepuluh	034/06/15	SK Rhu Sepuluh
Permaisuri (N06)	Saujana	034/06/16	SK Saujana

=== Representation history ===
Members of the Legislative Assembly for Permaisuri
Assembly	No	Years	Members	Party
Constituency created from Setiu and Langkap
7th	N06	1986–1990	Tengku Mahmud Tengku Mansor	BN (UMNO)
8th	N06	1990–1995	Shafee Omar	BN (UMNO)
9th	N06	1995–1999	Mohd Jidin Shafee	BN (UMNO)
10th	N06	1999–2004	Rozali Muhammad	PAS
11th	N06	2004–2008	Mohd Jidin Shafee	BN (UMNO)
12th	N06	2008–2013	Abd Halim Jusoh	BN (UMNO)
13th	N06	2013–2018	Mohd Jidin Shafee	BN (UMNO)
14th	N06	2018–2023	Abd Halim Jusoh	BN (UMNO)
15th	N06	2023–present	Mohd Yusop Majid	PN (BERSATU)

== Election results ==
Terengganu state election, 2023: Permaisuri
Party	Candidate	Votes	%	∆%
PAS	Mohd Yusop Majid	14,837	67.03	▲24.21
BN	Hamdan Hamzah	7,299	32.97	▼19.87
Total valid votes		22,136	100.00	
Total rejected ballots		171		
Unreturned ballots		15		
Turnout		22,322	72.62	▼11.68
Registered electors		30,739		
Majority		7,538	34.06	▲24.04
PAS gain from BN		Swing		?

Terengganu state election, 2018: Permaisuri
Party	Candidate	Votes	%	∆%
BN	Abd Halim Jusoh	10,385	52.84	▲0.06
PAS	Zul Bhari A Rahman	8,415	42.82	▲42.82
PKR	Wan Mokhtar Wan Ibrahim	853	4.34	▼31.70
Total valid votes		19,653	100.00	
Total rejected ballots		333		
Unreturned ballots		104		
Turnout		20,090	84.27	▼3.35
Registered electors		23,839		
Majority		1,970	10.02	▼6.83
BN hold		Swing		

Terengganu state election, 2013: Permaisuri
Party	Candidate	Votes	%	∆%
BN	Mohd Jidin Shafee	9,188	52.90	▼10.54
PKR	Wan Mokhtar Wan Ibrahim	6,260	36.04	▼0.64
Independent	Mohd Yusop Majid	1,920	11.06	▲11.06
Total valid votes		17,368	100.00	
Total rejected ballots		398		
Unreturned ballots		41		
Turnout		17,807	87.62	▲1.08
Registered electors		20,322		
Majority		2,928	16.86	▼9.77
BN hold		Swing		

Terengganu state election, 2008: Permaisuri
Party	Candidate	Votes	%	∆%
BN	Abd Halim Jusoh	8,652	63.32	▲2.53
PKR	Wan Rahim Wan Hamzah	5,013	36.68	▲36.68
Total valid votes		13,665	100.00	
Total rejected ballots		245		
Unreturned ballots		0		
Turnout		13,910	86.54	▼2.72
Registered electors		16,073		
Majority		3,639	26.63	▲5.00
BN hold		Swing		

Terengganu state election, 2004: Permaisuri
Party	Candidate	Votes	%	∆%
BN	Mohd Jidin Shafee	7,690	60.79	▲13.11
PAS	Rozali Muhammad	4,955	39.17	▼13.05
Total valid votes		12,645	100.00	
Total rejected ballots		160		
Unreturned ballots		5		
Turnout		12,810	89.26	▲6.09
Registered electors		14,351		
Majority		2,735	21.63	▲17.08
BN gain from PAS		Swing		?

Terengganu state election, 1999: Permaisuri
Party	Candidate	Votes	%	∆%
PAS	Rozali Muhammad	5,180	52.22	▲52.22
BN	Mohd Jidin Shafee	4,729	47.68	▼16.64
Total valid votes		9,909	100.00	
Total rejected ballots		249		
Unreturned ballots		10		
Turnout		10,168	83.17	▲0.16
Registered electors		12,225		
Majority		451	4.55	▼24.09
PAS gain from BN		Swing		?

Terengganu state election, 1995: Permaisuri
Party	Candidate	Votes	%	∆%
BN	Mohd Jidin Shafee	5,765	64.32	▲1.88
S46	Abdullah Mat Amin	3,198	35.68	▼1.88
Total valid votes		8,963	100.00	
Total rejected ballots		305		
Unreturned ballots		25		
Turnout		9,293	83.01	▼2.06
Registered electors		11,195		
Majority		2,567	28.64	▲3.77
BN hold		Swing		

Terengganu state election, 1990: Permaisuri
Party	Candidate	Votes	%	∆%
BN	Shafi'I bin Omar	4,792	62.44	▼3.53
S46	Alias Zainal	2,883	37.56	▲37.56
Total valid votes		7,675	100.00	
Total rejected ballots		302		
Unreturned ballots		7		
Turnout		7,984	85.07	▲3.21
Registered electors		9,385		
Majority		1,909	24.87	▼7.06
BN hold		Swing		

Terengganu state election, 1986: Permaisuri
Party	Candidate	Votes	%
BN	Tengku Mahmud Mansor	4,127	65.97
PAS	Ghazali Abdullah	2,129	34.03
Total valid votes		6,256	100.00
Total rejected ballots		270	
Unreturned ballots		0	
Turnout		6,526	81.86
Registered electors		7,972	
Majority		1,998	31.94
This was a new constituency created.
