= Setiu District =

- District of Terengganu
- Daerah Setiu
- Flag Seal

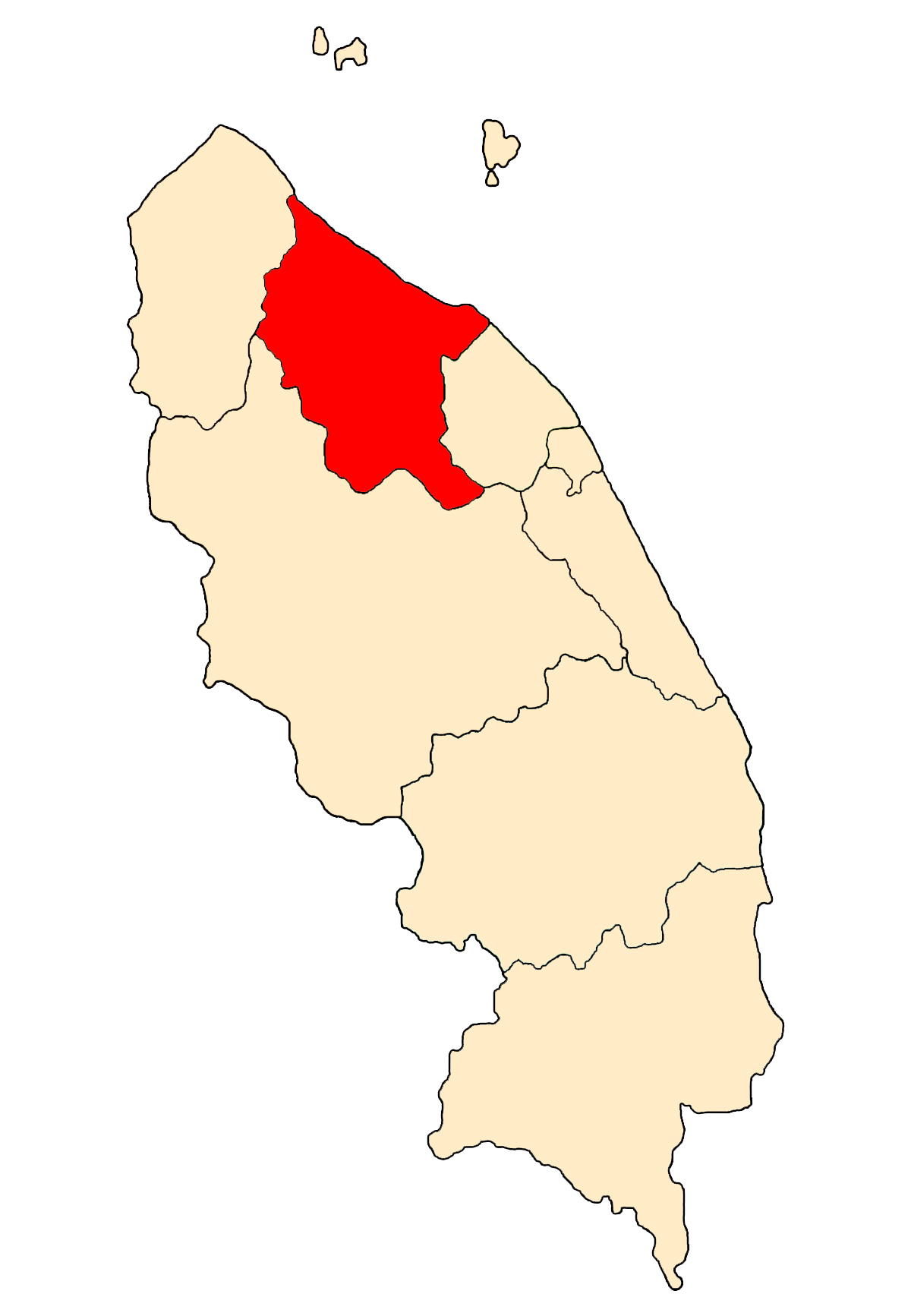
- Location of Setiu District in Terengganu

- Location of Setiu District in Malaysia
- Coordinates: 5°35′N 102°45′E
- Country: Malaysia
- State: Terengganu
- Seat: Bandar Permaisuri
- Local area government(s): Setiu District Council

Government
  - District officer: Haji Mohd Sophian bin Abu Bakar

Area
  - Total: 1,304.36 km^{2} (503.62 sq mi)

Population (2010)
  - Total: 54,405
  - Estimate (2014): 61,700
  - Density: 41.710/km^{2} (108.03/sq mi)
- Time zone: UTC+8 (MST)
  - Summer (DST): UTC+8 (Not observed)
- Postcode: 22xxx
- Calling code: +6-09-6
- Vehicle registration plates: T

Setiu is one of the districts in Terengganu, Malaysia. This district is bordered by Besut to the north, Hulu Terengganu to the south, and on the east, Kuala Nerus District.

Setiu is the second youngest and least populated district in Terengganu. Its capital is Bandar Permaisuri which also serves as its economic and commercial centre. Other towns are Chalok, Sungai Tong, Guntong and Penarik.

== Etymology and history ==
The district of Setiu is believed to have taken its name from a Tok Setiu, a Bugis commander who escaped the Dutch conquest of the Indonesian archipelago in the 19th century and immigrated to Terengganu. The Sultan allowed Tok Setiu and his followers to open a kampong in the plains located north of Kuala Terengganu.

Setiu, as a district, had existed as early as the 1920s, with a smaller territory than its present-day borders, during the early days of British protection over Terengganu. In 1923 it was annexed into the neighbouring Besut District until 1935, when it was made a separate district. That same year Setiu district was partitioned between Besut district and the state capital Kuala Terengganu. Setiu district with its present-day borders was reorganised in 1985, merging Mukim Merang, Mukim Hulu Nerus and Mukim Belara (portion) from Kuala Terengganu (now Kuala Nerus) and Mukim Caluk, Mukim Guntung, Mukim Pantai Tasik and Mukim Hulu Setiu from Besut.

== Demographics ==
Historical population
Year	Pop.	±%
1991	42,434	—
2000	50,346	+18.6%
2010	54,563	+8.4%
2020	59,651	+9.3%

Majority of the inhabitants of Setiu are ethnic Malays, with remainder from the minority Chinese, Siamese and Indian communities. Most Malays in Setiu especially in the northern part speaks Kelantan-Pattani Malay however those that live in southern Setiu speaks Terengganu Malay.

== Administrative divisions ==

Setiu is divided into 7 mukims, which are:

- Chaluk
- Guntung
- Hulu Nerus
- Hulu Setiu
- Merang
- Pantai
- Tasik

== Tourist attractions ==
Among the places of interest in this district are Terengganu International Equestrian Park (TIEP), Setiu Wetlands, Lata Payung, Lata Changkah, Mount Tebu, Rhu Sepuluh Beach, and Terrapuri CUltural Village.

== Federal Parliament and State Assembly Seats ==
List of LMS district representatives in the Federal Parliament (Dewan Rakyat):

Parliament	Seat Name	Member of Parliament	Party
P34	Setiu	Shaharizukirnain Abdul Kadir	Perikatan Nasional (PAS)

List of LMS district representatives in the State Legislative Assembly of Terengganu:

Parliament	State	Seat Name	State Assemblyman	Party
P34	N6	Permaisuri	Mohd Yusof Majid	Perikatan Nasional (BERSATU)
P34	N7	Langkap	Azmi Maarof	Perikatan Nasional (PAS)

== See also ==
- Districts of Malaysia
