= Mohd Nurkhuzaini Ab Rahman =

Malaysian politician

Yang Berhormat Tuan Haji Mohd Nurkhuzaini Ab Rahman SMZ SMT MLA
- محمد نورخزايني بن عبدالرحمن

Member of the Terengganu State Executive Council (Entrepreneurship, Micro Industry and Hawker Affairs)
- Incumbent
- Assumed office 10 May 2018
- Monarch: Mizan Zainal Abidin
- Deputy: Wan Hapandi Wan Nik
- Menteri Besar: Ahmad Samsuri Mokhtar
- Constituency: Kota Putera

Member of the Terengganu State Legislative Assembly for Kota Putera
- Incumbent
- Assumed office 9 May 2018
- Preceded by: Mohd Mahdi Musa (BN–UMNO)
- Majority: 1,181 (2018); 3,809 (2023)

Faction represented in Terengganu State Legislative Assembly
- 2018–2020: Malaysian Islamic Party
- 2020–: Perikatan Nasional

Personal details
- Born: Mohd Nurkhuzaini bin Ab Rahman; 16 September 1971 (age 54) Kampung Raja, Terengganu, Malaysia
- Citizenship: Malaysian
- Party: Malaysian Islamic Party (PAS)
- Other political affiliations: Perikatan Nasional (PN); Gagasan Sejahtera (GS)
- Occupation: Politician

Mohd Nurkhuzaini bin Ab Rahman (born 16 September 1971) is a Malaysian politician who has served as Member of the Terengganu State Executive Council (EXCO) in the Perikatan Nasional (PN) state administration under Menteri Besar Ahmad Samsuri Mokhtar as well as Member of the Terengganu State Legislative Assembly (MLA) for Kota Putera since May 2018. He is a member of the Malaysian Islamic Party (PAS), a component party of the PN coalition.

== Political career ==
=== Member of the Terengganu State Legislative Assembly (since 2018) ===
In the 2018 Terengganu state election, Mohd Nurkhuzaini was nominated by PAS to contest for the Kota Putera state seat. He won the seat and was elected as the Kota Putera MLA for the first term after defeating defending MLA Mohd Mahdi Musa of BN and candidate of Pakatan Harapan (PH) by a majority of 1,181 votes.

=== Member of the Terengganu State Executive Council (since 2018) ===
On 10 May 2018 after PAS took over the state administration from BN after PAS defeated BN in the 2018 state election, Mohd Nurkhuzaini was appointed as Terengganu EXCO Member in charge of Entrepreneurship, Micro Industry and Hawker Affairs by Menteri Besar Ahmad Samsuri.

== Election results ==
Terengganu State Legislative Assembly
Year	Constituency	Candidate	Votes	Pct	Opponent(s)	Votes	Pct	Ballots cast	Majority	Turnout
2018	N02 Kota Putera	Mohd Nurkhuzaini Ab Rahman (PAS)	9,704	49.18%	Mohd Mahdi Musa (UMNO)	8,523	43.20%	20,180	1,181	83.50%
2018	N02 Kota Putera	Mohd Nurkhuzaini Ab Rahman (PAS)	9,704	49.18%	Tengku Roslan Tengku Othman @ Tengku Ramli (PKR)	1,504	7.62%	20,180	1,181	83.50%
2023	N02 Kota Putera	Mohd Nurkhuzaini Ab Rahman (PAS)	13,360	58.31%	Muhammad Pehimi Yusof (UMNO)	9,551	41.69%	23,041	3,809	70.26%

== Honours ==
- Terengganu
  - Companion of the Order of the Crown of Terengganu (SMT)
  - Companion of the Order of Sultan Mizan Zainal Abidin of Terengganu (SMZ) (2022)
