= Malaysia Federal Route 84 =

Road in Malaysia

Federal Route 84
- Jalan Kampung Raja

Route information
- Maintained by Malaysian Public Works Department
- Length: 15.4 km (9.6 mi)

Major junctions
- Southwest end: Jerteh
- FT 3 / AH18 Federal Route 3 FT 189 Federal Route 189
- Northeast end: Kuala Besut

Location
- Country: Malaysia
- Primary destinations: Alor Lintah, Kampung Raja, Perhentian Islands

Highway system
- Highways in Malaysia; Expressways; Federal; State

Federal Route 84, Jalan Kampung Raja, is a federal road in Terengganu, Malaysia. The road connects Jerteh in the southwest to Kuala Besut in the northeast.

== Route background ==
The Kilometre Zero of the Federal Route 84 starts at Kuala Besut.

== Features ==
At most sections, the Federal Route 84 was built under the JKR R5 road standard, allowing maximum speed limit of up to 90 km/h.

== Junction lists ==
The entire route is located in Besut District, Terengganu.

Legend:

- I/C - Interchange, I/S - Intersection, RSA - Rest and service area, OBR - Overhead bridge restaurant, R/R - Restaurant and rest plaza, L/B - Layby, V/P - Vista point, TN - tunnel, T/P - Toll plaza, BR - Bridge
- C - Cloverleaf, S - Stack, T-A - Trumpet-A, T-B - Trumpet-B, DT - Directional-T/Y, SDT - Semi-Directional-T/Y, P-Y - Partial-Y, D - Diamond, P-C - Partial cloverleaf, D-D - Diverging diamond, D-R - Direct ramp

Location	km	mi	Name	Destinations	Notes
Jerteh	15.4	9.6	Jerteh	FT 3 / AH18 Malaysia Federal Route 3 – Kota Bahru, Pasir Puteh, Machang, Tanah Merah, Bandar Permaisuri, Kuala Terengganu	T-junctions
Jerteh			Jalan Kalan Bunut	T152 Jalan Kalan Bunut – Kalan Bunut, Kampung Tok Raja	T-junctions
Alor Lintah			Alor Lintah	T161 Jalan Alor Lintah – Gong Nering, Setiu	T-junctions
Kampung Raja			Kampung Gong Jaga	T157 Jalan Pak Wong – Pintu Gajah, Kampung Pak Wong, Bukit Tumbuh	Junctions
Kampung Raja			Kampung Gong Badang		
Kampung Raja			Kampung Raja	T3 Jalan Beting Lintang – Pulau Salim, Penarik	Junctions
Kuala Besut			Sungai Besut Bridge		
Kuala Besut			Kuala Besut	Jalan Masjid – Town Centre, Kuala Besut jetty (Ferry to Perhentian Islands)	T-junctions
Kuala Besut	0.0	0.0	Kuala Besut	FT 189 Malaysia Federal Route 189 – Bachok, Tok Bali, Gong Kedak, Seberang Jertih	Junctions
1.000 mi = 1.609 km; 1.000 km = 0.621 mi
