= Malaysia Federal Route 189 =

Road in Malaysia

Federal Route 189
- Jalan Pesisiran Pantai Kelantan

Route information
- Length: 52.66 km (32.72 mi)

Major junctions
- North end: Bachok
- FT 211 Federal Route 211; FT 84 Federal Route 84; FT 3 AH18 Federal Route 3
- South end: Jerteh

Location
- Country: Malaysia
- Primary destinations: Jelawat; Air Tawar; Tok Bali; Cherang Ruku; Kuala Besut

Highway system
- Highways in Malaysia; Expressways; Federal; State

Federal Route 189 (formerly Kelantan State Route D11, D7 and Terengganu State Route T7) is a federal road in Kelantan, Malaysia. It is also a main route to the Royal Malaysian Air Force (RMAF) Gong Kedak Air Force Base.

== Features ==
At most sections, the Federal Route 189 was built under the JKR R5 road standard, allowing maximum speed limit of up to 90 km/h.

== List of junctions and towns ==
Km	Exit	Junctions	To	Remarks
		Bachok	Northwest; FT 211 Kubang Kerian; FT 3 AH18 Kota Bharu	T-junctions
		Jelawat		
		Air Tawar		
		Tok Bali		
		Sungai Semerak bridge		
		Semerak Dyke		
		Cherang Ruku		
Kelantan Darul Naim; Pasir Puteh district border
Kelantan-Terengganu border
Terengganu Darul Iman; Besut district border
		Kuala Besut		
		Kuala Besut	Northeast; FT 84 Town Centre	T-junctions
		Kuala Besut		
		Kampung Cawat		
		Pulau Salim		
		Kampung Nangka		
		Kampung Baru		
		Kampung Lampu		
		Royal Malaysian Air Force (RMAF) Gong Kedak Air Force Base (Home of Sukhoi's Su-30MKM)		
		Gong Kedak		
		Kampung Beris Pak Abu		
		Kampung Pusu Tinggi		
		Kampung Dengir		
		Kampung Tok Has		
		Taman Tuah Jaya		
		Jerteh	North; FT 3 AH18 Kota Bahru; FT 3 AH18 Pasir Puteh; FT 4 AH140 Machang; FT 4 AH140 Tanah Merah South; FT 3 AH18 Kuala Terengganu; FT 3 AH18 Bandar Permaisuri (Setiu); East Coast Expressway East Coast Expressway; Kuala Lumpur; Kuantan	T-junctions
