= Tok Bali =

Human settlement in Kelantan

Tok Bali is a small fishing port and also oil and gas supply base in Kelantan, Malaysia, located about 48 kilometres from Kota Bharu. In recent years, it has served as an alternative departure point for tourists to the Perhentian Islands. Taxi drivers are reportedly given a hefty commission for delivering passengers here rather than the main departure point at Kuala Besut, further south. The village's main sources of income are fishing and farming (primarily tobacco).

The Marine Department has allocated RM5 million for development through the East Coast economic region, including for further developing Tok Bali as a base for fishing boats and tourist boats to the Perhentians and Pulau Redang.
