= Mount Tebu =

- Location within Terengganu Location within Malaysia

Highest point
- Elevation: 1,039 m (3,409 ft)
- Prominence: 1,039 m (3,409 ft)
- Coordinates: 5°35′25″N 102°36′42″E

Naming
- Native name: Gunung Tebu (Malay)

Geography
- Location: Besut District, Terengganu, Malaysia
- Parent range: Pantai Timur Range

Mount Tebu is a mountain located in the state of Terengganu, Malaysia. It is the 8th highest peak in Terengganu, standing at an elevation of approximately 1,039 meters (3,408 feet) above sea level. Located within the Gunung Tebu Forest Reserve in the district of Besut, the uniqueness of its terrain attracts both local and international hikers.

Those who wish to climb Gunung Tebu must obtain written permission from the Terengganu State Forestry Office. The climb begins at Hutan Lipur Lata Belatan, and an entrance fee of RM5 is charged at the entrance.

== Features ==
Some interesting spots found along the climb to the summit of Mount Tebu include batu Mat Hasan, telaga afdal, batu madrasah, and kubur panjang. If the weather is clear with few clouds, hikers will be able to see two of Terengganu's famous islands, Pulau Redang and Pulau Perhentian, from the peak of Mount Tebu.

== Topography ==
Hill ad Upper Dipterocarp forest types can be found here. Perhentian Islands and Redang Island can be seen from its summit if there is no thick fog.

== See also ==
- List of mountains of Malaysia
