= 2013 Malaysian state elections =

- 5 May 2013

12 of the 13 state legislative assemblies

State elections were held in all states and territories in Malaysia except Sarawak on 5 May 2013, alongside general elections. Although the Pakatan Rakyat alliance received over 50% of the vote across the 12 states and territories where elections took place, the Barisan Nasional won the most seats, emerging as the largest faction in all states and territories except Kelantan, Penang and Selangor.

== Results ==
State/federal territory	Barisan Nasional				Pakatan Rakyat				Independents and others				Total	
State/federal territory	Votes	%	Seats	±	Votes	%	Seats	±	Votes	%	Seats	±	Votes	Seats
Johor	737,876	53.98	38	–12	625,965	45.79	18	12	3,065	0.22	0	0	1,366,906	56
Kedah	449,278	50.37	21	7	434,621	48.73	15	–6	7,993	0.90	0	–1	891,892	36
Kelantan	343,416	44.62	12	5	425,291	55.26	33	–5	888	0.12	0	0	769,595	45
Malacca	201,228	53.31	21	–2	174,232	46.16	7	2	1,995	0.53	0	0	377,455	28
Negeri Sembilan	241,500	51.86	22	1	220,779	47.41	14	–1	3,408	0.73	0	0	465,687	36
Pahang	330,868	54.09	30	–8	270,230	44.18	12	8	10,607	1.73	0	0	611,705	42
Penang	233,305	32.09	10	–1	490,739	67.50	30	1	2,959	0.41	0	0	727,003	40
Perak	506,947	44.40	31	3	625,710	54.80	28	1	9,122	0.80	0	–4	1,141,779	59
Perlis	65,221	56.37	13	0	48,375	41.81	2	0	2,106	1.82	0	0	115,702	15
Sabah	428,634	55.67	48	–9	248,187	32.23	11	10	93,157	12.10	1	–1	769,978	60
Selangor	693,956	39.25	12	–9	1,050,665	59.42	44	10	23,567	1.33	0	0	1,768,188	56
Terengganu	282,999	51.37	17	–7	264,501	48.01	15	7	3,392	0.62	0	0	550,892	32
Total	4,515,228	47.25	275	–32	4,879,295	51.06	229	39	162,259	1.70	1	–6	9,556,782	505

=== Perlis ===
Party or alliance		Votes	%	Seats	+/–
Barisan Nasional	United Malays National Organisation	60,562	52.78	12	0
Barisan Nasional	Malaysian Chinese Association	3,925	3.42	1	–1
Barisan Nasional	Total	64,487	56.20	13	–1
Pakatan Rakyat	Pan-Malaysian Islamic Party	27,076	23.60	1	0
Pakatan Rakyat	People's Justice Party	18,858	16.43	1	+1
Pakatan Rakyat	Democratic Action Party	2,439	2.13	0	0
Pakatan Rakyat	Total	48,373	42.16	2	0
Independents		1,884	1.64	0	0
Total		114,744	100.00	15	0
Valid votes		114,744	98.29		
Invalid/blank votes		2,002	1.71		
Total votes		116,746	100.00		
Registered voters/turnout		136,131	85.76		
Source: Undi.info

=== Kedah ===
Party or alliance		Votes	%	Seats	+/–
Barisan Nasional	United Malays National Organisation	449,278	50.49	19	+7
Barisan Nasional	Malaysian Chinese Association	449,278	50.49	2	+1
Barisan Nasional	Malaysian Indian Congress	449,278	50.49	0	0
Barisan Nasional	Parti Gerakan Rakyat Malaysia	449,278	50.49	0	–1
Barisan Nasional	Total	449,278	50.49	21	+7
Pan-Malaysian Islamic Party		289,174	32.50	9	–7
People's Justice Party		127,702	14.35	4	0
Democratic Action Party		17,745	1.99	2	+1
Pan-Malaysian Islamic Front		898	0.10	0	0
People's Welfare Party		357	0.04	0	0
Malaysian United People's Party		192	0.02	0	0
Independents		4,485	0.50	0	–1
Total		889,831	100.00	36	0

=== Kelantan ===
Party or alliance		Votes	%	Seats	+/–
Pakatan Rakyat	Pan-Malaysian Islamic Party	398,238	51.75	32	–6
Pakatan Rakyat	People's Justice Party	27,053	3.52	1	0
Pakatan Rakyat	Total	425,291	55.26	33	-6
Barisan Nasional	United Malays National Organisation	328,454	42.68	12	+6
Barisan Nasional	Malaysian Chinese Association	7,651	0.99	0	0
Barisan Nasional	People's Progressive Party	7,311	0.95	0	0
Barisan Nasional	Total	343,416	44.62	12	+6
Independents		888	0.12	0	0
Total		769,595	100.00	45	–
Valid votes		769,595	98.66		
Invalid/blank votes		10,487	1.34		
Total votes		780,082	100.00		
Registered voters/turnout		918,573	84.92		
Source: https://undi.info

=== Terengganu ===
Party or alliance		Votes	%	Seats	+/–
Barisan Nasional	United Malays National Organisation	275,833	50.07	17	–6
Barisan Nasional	Malaysian Chinese Association	7,254	1.32	0	–1
Barisan Nasional	Total	283,087	51.38	17	–7
Pakatan Rakyat	Pan-Malaysian Islamic Party	245,209	44.51	14	+6
Pakatan Rakyat	People's Justice Party	19,256	3.50	1	+1
Pakatan Rakyat	Total	264,465	48.00	15	+7
Independents		3,392	0.62	0	0
Total		550,944	100.00	32	0
Valid votes		550,944	98.77		
Invalid/blank votes		6,836	1.23		
Total votes		557,780	100.00		
Registered voters/turnout		634,944	87.85		
Source: UNDI

Kuala Besut BN assemblyman, A. Rahman Mokhtar died on 26 June 2013, paving way for a by-election

=== Penang ===
Party or alliance		Votes	%	Seats	+/–
Pakatan Rakyat	Democratic Action Party	273,994	37.70	19	0
Pakatan Rakyat	People's Justice Party	179,705	24.73	10	+1
Pakatan Rakyat	Pan-Malaysian Islamic Party	37,099	5.10	1	0
Pakatan Rakyat	Total	490,798	67.53	30	+1
Barisan Nasional	United Malays National Organisation	123,251	16.96	10	–1
Barisan Nasional	Parti Gerakan Rakyat Malaysia	66,461	9.14	0	0
Barisan Nasional	Malaysian Chinese Association	35,852	4.93	0	0
Barisan Nasional	Malaysian Indian Congress	7,682	1.06	0	0
Barisan Nasional	Total	233,246	32.09	10	–1
Love Malaysia Party		216	0.03	0	0
People's Welfare Party		159	0.02	0	0
Independents		2,332	0.32	0	0
Total		726,751	100.00	40	0
Valid votes		726,751	98.79		
Invalid/blank votes		8,888	1.21		
Total votes		735,639	100.00		
Registered voters/turnout		846,232	86.93		
Source: UNDI

=== Perak ===
Party or alliance		Votes	%	Seats	+/–
Barisan Nasional	United Malays National Organisation	357,800	31.63	30	+3
Barisan Nasional	Malaysian Chinese Association	94,272	8.33	1	0
Barisan Nasional	Parti Gerakan Rakyat Malaysia	31,049	2.74	0	0
Barisan Nasional	Malaysian Indian Congress	18,003	1.59	0	0
Barisan Nasional	People's Progressive Party	5,823	0.51	0	0
Barisan Nasional	Total	506,947	44.82	31	+3
Pakatan Rakyat	Democratic Action Party	270,137	23.88	18	0
Pakatan Rakyat	Pan-Malaysian Islamic Party	193,674	17.12	5	–1
Pakatan Rakyat	People's Justice Party	153,859	13.60	5	–2
Pakatan Rakyat	Total	617,670	54.60	28	-3
Pan-Malaysian Islamic Front		783	0.07	0	0
Independents		5,771	0.51	0	0
Total		1,131,171	100.00	59	0
Valid votes		1,131,171	98.35		
Invalid/blank votes		19,026	1.65		
Total votes		1,150,197	100.00		
Registered voters/turnout		1,406,734	81.76		

=== Pahang ===
Party or alliance		Votes	%	Seats	+/–
Barisan Nasional	United Malays National Organisation	257,706	42.13	28	–1
Barisan Nasional	Malaysian Chinese Association	59,039	9.65	2	–4
Barisan Nasional	Parti Gerakan Rakyat Malaysia	9,801	1.60	0	–1
Barisan Nasional	Malaysian Indian Congress	4,322	0.71	0	–1
Barisan Nasional	Total	330,868	54.09	30	–7
Pakatan Rakyat	Democratic Action Party	61,765	10.10	7	+5
Pakatan Rakyat	Pan-Malaysian Islamic Party	133,525	21.83	3	+1
Pakatan Rakyat	People's Justice Party	74,940	12.25	2	+2
Pakatan Rakyat	Total	270,230	44.18	12	7
Independents		10,607	1.73	0	–1
Total		611,705	100.00	42	0
Valid votes		611,705	98.17		
Invalid/blank votes		11,425	1.83		
Total votes		623,130	100.00		
Registered voters/turnout		736,111	84.65		
Source: https://undi.info

=== Selangor ===
Party or alliance		Seats	+/–
Pakatan Rakyat	People's Justice Party	14	–1
Pakatan Rakyat	Pan-Malaysian Islamic Party	15	+7
Pakatan Rakyat	Democratic Action Party	15	+2
Pakatan Rakyat	Total	44	+8
Barisan Nasional	United Malays National Organisation	12	–6
Barisan Nasional	Malaysian Chinese Association	0	–2
Barisan Nasional	Parti Gerakan Rakyat Malaysia	0	0
Barisan Nasional	Malaysian Indian Congress	0	0
Barisan Nasional	People's Progressive Party	0	0
Barisan Nasional	Total	12	–8
Socialist Party of Malaysia		0	0
People's Welfare Party		0	0
Pan-Malaysian Islamic Front		0	0
Independents		0	0
Total		56	0

=== Negeri Sembilan ===
Party or alliance		Seats	+/–
Barisan Nasional	United Malays National Organisation	21	+2
Barisan Nasional	Malaysian Indian Congress	1	0
Barisan Nasional	Malaysian Chinese Association	0	–1
Barisan Nasional	Parti Gerakan Rakyat Malaysia	0	0
Barisan Nasional	Total	22	+1
Democratic Action Party		11	+1
People's Justice Party		3	–1
Pan-Malaysian Islamic Party		0	–1
Total		36	0

=== Malacca ===
Party or alliance		Votes	%	Seats	+/–
Barisan Nasional	United Malays National Organisation	130,660	34.68	17	–2
Barisan Nasional	Malaysian Chinese Association	50,115	13.30	3	0
Barisan Nasional	Parti Gerakan Rakyat Malaysia	11,016	2.92	0	0
Barisan Nasional	Malaysian Indian Congress	5,975	1.59	1	0
Barisan Nasional	People's Progressive Party	3,462	0.92	0	0
Barisan Nasional	Total	201,228	53.41	21	–2
Pakatan Rakyat	Democratic Action Party	86,562	22.98	6	+1
Pakatan Rakyat	Pan-Malaysian Islamic Party	56,528	15.00	1	+1
Pakatan Rakyat	People's Justice Party	31,142	8.27	0	0
Pakatan Rakyat	Total	174,232	46.24	7	+2
People's Welfare Party		61	0.02	0	0
Independents		1,242	0.33	0	0
Total		376,763	100.00	28	0
Source: UNDI

=== Johor ===
Party or alliance		Votes	%	Seats	+/–
Barisan Nasional	United Malays National Organisation	459,921	33.65	32	0
Barisan Nasional	Malaysian Chinese Association	203,501	14.89	2	–10
Barisan Nasional	Malaysian Indian Congress	56,602	4.14	3	–1
Barisan Nasional	Parti Gerakan Rakyat Malaysia	17,966	1.31	1	–1
Barisan Nasional	Total	737,990	53.99	38	–15
Pakatan Rakyat	Pan-Malaysian Islamic Party	292,588	21.41	4	+2
Pakatan Rakyat	Democratic Action Party	252,934	18.50	13	+9
Pakatan Rakyat	People's Justice Party	80,329	5.88	1	+1
Pakatan Rakyat	Total	625,851	45.79	18	+12
Independents		3,065	0.22	0	0
Total		1,366,906	100.00	56	0
Source: UNDI

=== Sabah ===
Party or alliance		Votes	%	Seats	+/–
Barisan Nasional	United Malays National Organisation	260,342	33.94	31	–1
Barisan Nasional	United Sabah Party	77,983	10.17	7	–5
Barisan Nasional	United Pasokmomogun Kadazandusun Murut Organisation	34,550	4.50	4	–2
Barisan Nasional	Liberal Democratic Party	25,264	3.29	3	0
Barisan Nasional	Parti Gerakan Rakyat Malaysia	14,258	1.86	2	+2
Barisan Nasional	Malaysian Chinese Association	8,270	1.08	0	–1
Barisan Nasional	Parti Bersatu Rakyat Sabah	7,223	0.94	1	0
Barisan Nasional	Total	427,890	55.79	48	–7
Pakatan Rakyat	People's Justice Party	164,068	21.39	7	+7
Pakatan Rakyat	Democratic Action Party	62,784	8.19	4	+3
Pakatan Rakyat	Pan-Malaysian Islamic Party	21,333	2.78	0	0
Pakatan Rakyat	Total	248,185	32.36	11	+10
State Reform Party		43,167	5.63	1	+1
Sabah Progressive Party		28,305	3.69	0	–4
Malaysian United People's Party		1,444	0.19	0	0
People's Welfare Party		138	0.02	0	0
Independents		17,902	2.33	0	0
Total		767,031	100.00	60	0
Valid votes		767,031	97.76		
Invalid/blank votes		17,607	2.24		
Total votes		784,638	100.00		
Registered voters/turnout		982,337	79.87		
