= Lang Tengah Island =

Island in Kuala Nerus, Terengganu, Malaysia

Native name: Pulau Lang Tengah
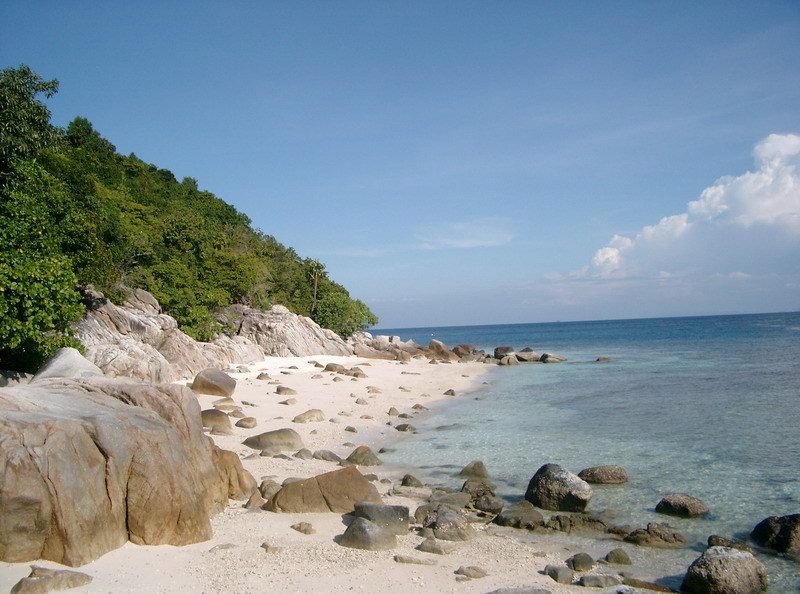
- Landscape of Lang Tengah Island
- Interactive map of Lang Tengah Island

Geography
- Location: South China Sea
- Coordinates: 5°47′N 102°53′E
- Archipelago: Redang Islands
- Area: 1.3 km^{2} (0.50 sq mi)

Administration
- Malaysia
- State: Terengganu
- District: Kuala Nerus
- Mukim: Redang Islands

Additional information
- Time zone: MST (UTC+8)
- Postal code: 21090

Building on Lang Tengah Island

Lang Tengah Island (Malay: Pulau Lang Tengah) is an island in Kuala Nerus District, Terengganu, Malaysia. It is connected to the mainland by ferries to Merang.

== Surroundings and access ==
Lang Tengah Island is located about 40 km north east of Kuala Terengganu (22.5 km from Tanjung Merang) on the east coast of peninsular Malaysia.

Tanjung Merang is a small fishing village 45 minutes north of Kuala Terengganu and the jetty is a few minutes outside of the village. The Lang Tengah Island can be reached by boat from Tanjung Merang (not to be confused with Marang, south of Kuala Terengganu), 45 minutes’ drive north of Kuala Terengganu. Speedboat departures from here are usually pre-arranged with your resort and take 40 minutes. Most boat operators have a fixed schedule, with two departures daily (morning and afternoon) in peak season and one departure in off-peak season. Transfers cost around RM95 return.

It is possible to charter a boat (from RM380 per trip) to Lang Tengah Island from Tanjung Merang, Redang Island or the Perhentian Islands.

== Hotels ==
The island appeals more to holiday goers who are looking for a quiet tropical island getaway. This is much quieter with less development than nearby (Redang). There are only five (5) resort hotels located on the island, including one which has closed down.

- Sari Pacifica Beach Resort Pulau Lang Tengah
- Lang Sari Resort (formerly Square Point Resort) (closed down and fully abandoned)
- Summer Bay Lang Tengah Island Resort (formerly Redang Lang Resort)
- D'Coconut Resort
- Blue Coral Island Resort (Sold, renovated and renamed to Sari Pacifica Beach Resort Pulau Lang Tengah)

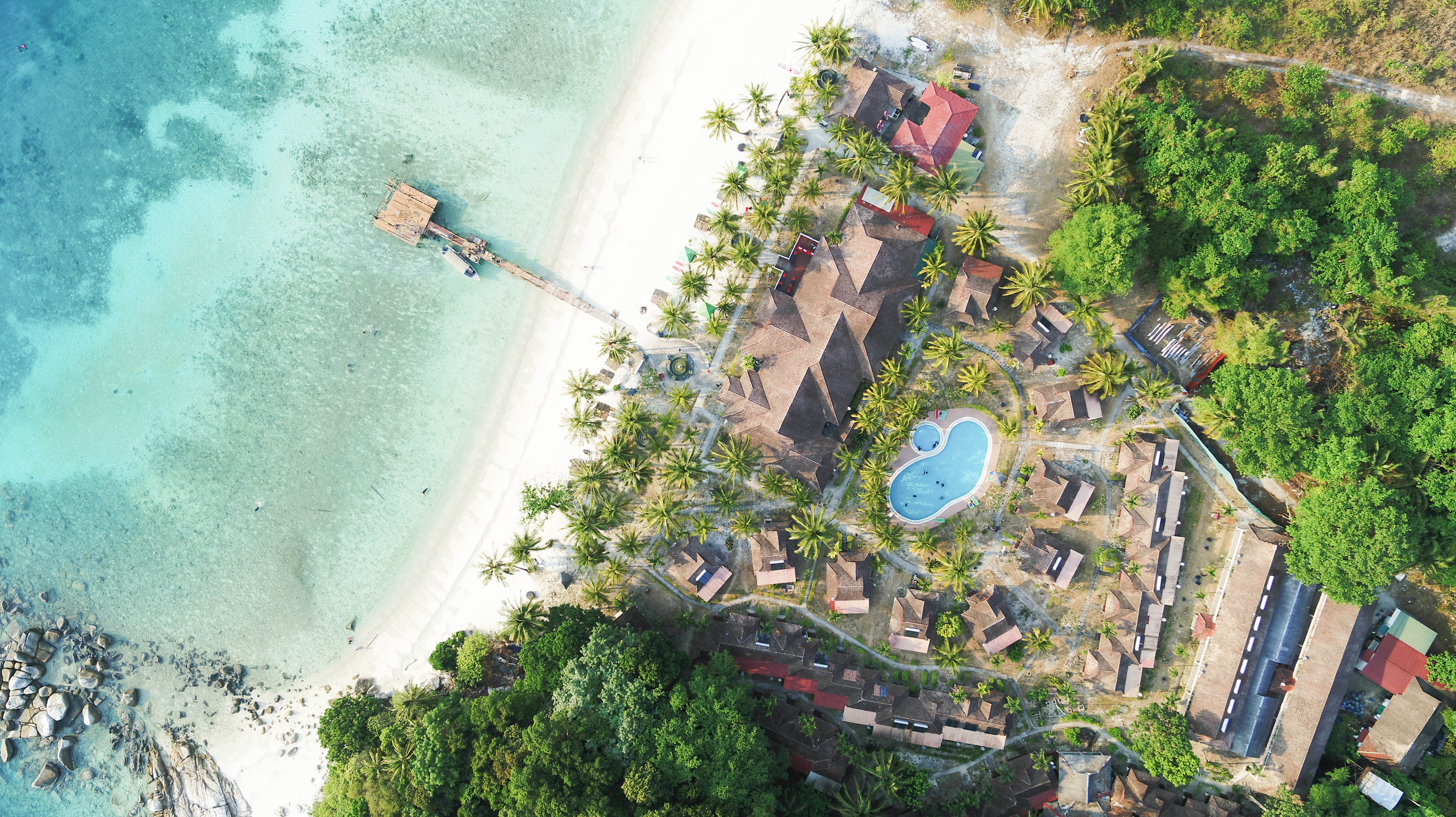
Sari Pacifica Beach Resort Pulau Lang Tengah

== Tourism ==
The tropical waters around Lang Tengah are clear with turquoise hues. The designated marine park in the island has corals and fish life is quite excellent. During peak season, the waters are calm which is excellent for learning to dive with one of the dive centres on the island.

In contrast to the neighboring islands of Perhentians and Redang, the island is quite low key. Almost all accommodation on the island are resort-based. Lang Tengah has a tropical climate with temperatures steadily around 30 °C and frequent but brief thunderstorms.

The 2011 Hong Kong-Chinese film, Love You You was filmed on the Summer Bay Lang Tengah Island Resort.

== Wildlife ==
The island has excellent coral reefs with teeming fish life and occasional sharks and rays. The island has nesting green turtles from April to October. Occasional hawksbill turtles also nest and are regularly seen in the sea. There are quite a few monitor lizards (biawak in Malay) but they are rarely seen near the resort beaches. In the early morning, the smaller monitor lizards commonly patrol the shoreline in the quiet parts of the island. The island is covered with primary forest and has a wide variety of birds, frogs, lizards and insects.

== Weather and seasons ==
Like the rest of Malaysia's east coast, Lang Tengah is affected by the northeast monsoon from the South China Sea, so most resorts are closed and ferry transport schedules are severely restricted between October and March.
