= Cnemaspis perhentianensis =

Scientific classification
- Kingdom: Animalia
- Phylum: Chordata
- Class: Reptilia
- Order: Squamata
- Suborder: Gekkota
- Family: Gekkonidae
- Genus: Cnemaspis
- Species: C. perhentianensis

Binomial name
- Cnemaspis perhentianensis Grismer & Chan, 2008

Species of lizard

Cnemaspis perhentianensis is a species of gecko endemic to Perhentian Besar in Malaysia.
