= Jelawat (disambiguation) =

Jelawat is a suburb in Bachok district, Kelantan, Malaysia.

Jelawat may also refer to:

- Typhoon Jelawat, list of typhoons by this name
- Jelawat (state constituency), state constituency in Malaysia
