= FELDA Selasih =

Coordinates: 5°38′55.7″N 102°37′15.3″E

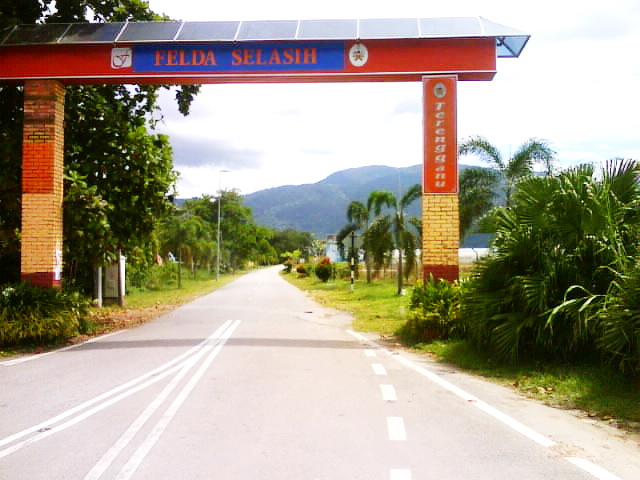
Felda Selasih

Felda Selasih is a FELDA community in Jerteh, Besut District, Terengganu, Malaysia. The only school in the community is Sekolah Kebangsaan Felda Selasih (primary school).

Postcode 22020
