= Perupok =

- Location within Malaysia
- Coordinates: 6°05′11″N 102°23′01″E
- Country: Malaysia
- State: Kelantan
- District: Bachok

Perupok is a small town in Bachok District, Kelantan, Malaysia. It is generally referred to as a "fishing village" as the community thrives in the said way of living. Among the main resources found are jewfish, herring, sea-bream, prawns, mackerel, and anchovy.
