= Redang Airport =

Airport in Kuala Nerus, Terengganu, Malaysia

Redang Airport Lapangan Terbang Redang
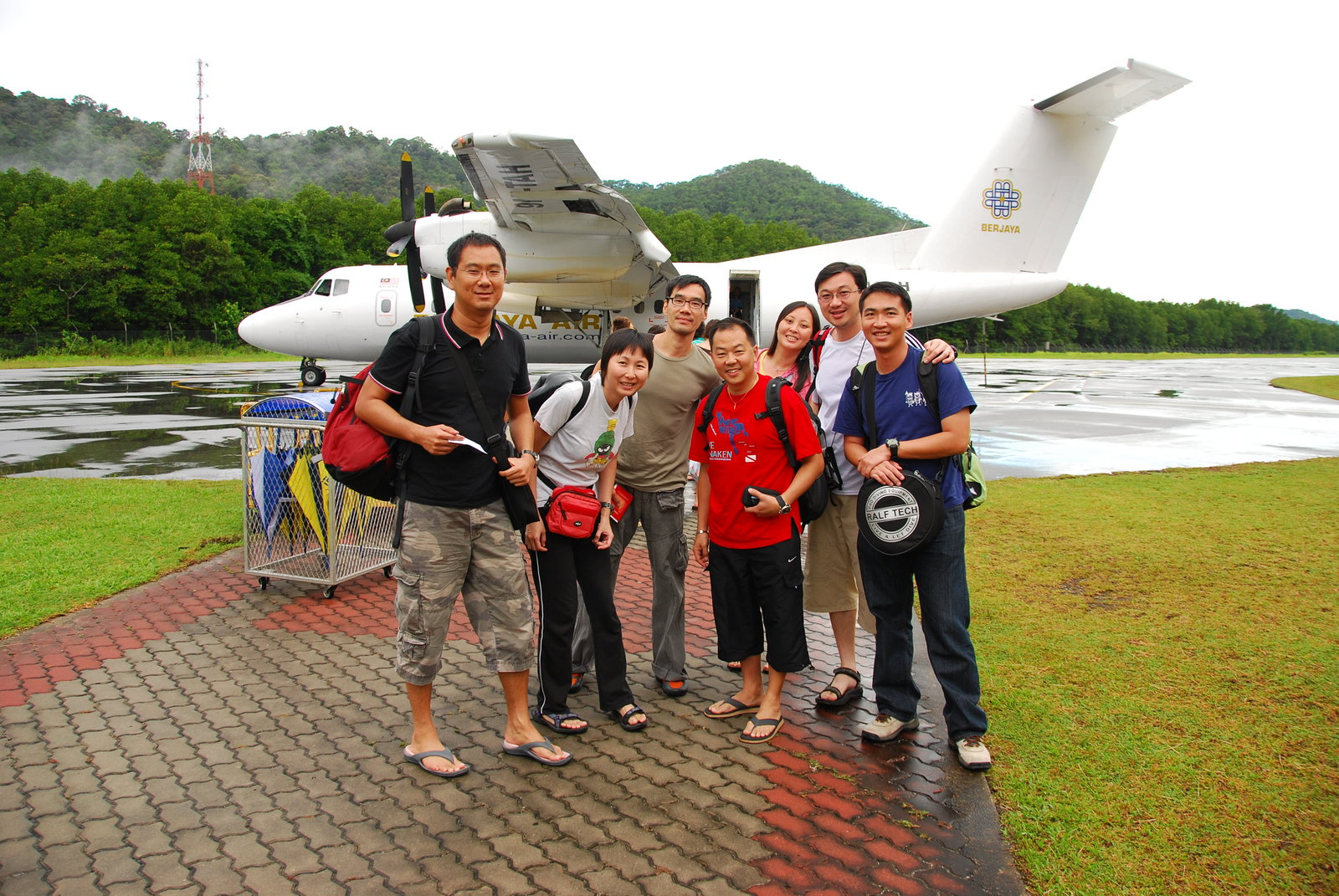
- IATA: RDN; ICAO: WMPR

Summary
- Airport type: Public
- Owner: Government of Malaysia
- Operator: Malaysia Airports
- Serves: Redang, Malaysia
- Location: Redang Island, Terengganu, Malaysia
- Time zone: MST (UTC+08:00)
- Elevation AMSL: 25 ft / 8 m
- Coordinates: 05°45′55″N 103°00′25″E

Map
- Location in West Malaysia

Runways
Direction	Length		Surface
Direction	m	ft	Surface
02/20	940	3,084	Asphalt

Statistics (2020)
- Passenger: 5159 (▲)
- Airfreight (tonnes): 0
- Aircraft movements: 39 (▲5550%)
- Source : AIP Malaysia GDM

Redang Airport (IATA: RDN, ICAO: WMPR) is an airport on Redang Island, Kuala Nerus District, Terengganu, Malaysia. The airport was briefly closed in 2009 for runway expansion, reopening on 16 April 2009.

The runway lies along the base of a long ridge immediately to the west. Another ridge runs parallel 1 kilometre (0.6 mi) to the east. South approach and departure are over the water, of the South China Sea.

== Airlines and destinations ==
Airlines	Destinations
Berjaya Air	Charter: Kuala Lumpur–Subang, Singapore–Seletar

== Traffic and statistics ==
=== Traffic ===
Annual passenger numbers and aircraft statistics
Year	Passengers handled	Passenger % change	Cargo (tonnes)	Cargo % change	Aircraft movements	Aircraft % change
2004	20,750	Steady	0	Steady	741	Steady
2005	30,650	▲47.7	0	Steady	1,121	▲51.3
2006	28,928	▼5.6	0	Steady	934	▼16.7
2007	33,738	▲16.6	0	Steady	1,053	▲12.7
2008	34,957	▲3.6	0	Steady	1,083	▲2.8
2009	28,246	▼19.2	0	Steady	862	▼20.4
2010	48,610	▲72.1	0	Steady	1,356	▲57.3
2011	46,159	▼5.0	0	Steady	1,319	▼2.7
2012	35,960	▼22.1	27	▲	877	▼33.5
2013	35,982	▲0.1	27	Steady	955	▲8.9
2014	11,087	▼69.2	17	▼37.7	430	▼55.0
2015	0	▼	0	▼	0	▼
2016	0	Steady	0	Steady	0	Steady
2017	0	Steady	0	Steady	0	Steady
2018	51	▲	0	Steady	6	▲
2019	0	▼	0	Steady	6	Steady
2020	5159	▲	0	Steady	39	▲5550
^{Source: Malaysia Airports Holdings Berhad}

=== Statistics ===
Busiest flights out of Redang Airport by frequency
Rank	Destinations	Frequency (weekly)
1	Selangor, Subang (SZB)	5
2	Singapore	3

== See also ==
- Transport in Malaysia
- List of airports in Malaysia
