= 2013 Kuala Besut by-election =

Election in Malaysia

- 24 July 2013

Kuala Besut seat in the Terengganu State Legislative Assembly
	BN	PAS
Candidate	Tengku Zaihan Che Ku Abdul Rahman	Azlan Yusof
Party	BN (UMNO)	PAS
Alliance		PR
Popular vote	8,288	5,696
Percentage	59.27%	40.73%
Kuala Besut assemblyman before election
A. Rahman Mokhtar
BN (UMNO)
Elected Kuala Besut assemblyman
Tengku Zaihan Che Ku Abdul Rahman
BN (UMNO)

A by-election was held for the Terengganu State Assembly seat of Kuala Besut on 24 July 2013 with nomination day on 12 July 2013. The seat of Kuala Besut fell vacant after the death of incumbent assemblyman, A. Rahman Mokhtar on 26 June 2013 from lung cancer. Dr. Mokhtar was an assemblyman from the United Malays National Organisation, a component party of the ruling Barisan Nasional coalition, which holds a 1-seat majority into the by-election. The by-election was contested by Tengku Zaihan Che Ku Abdul Rahman from UMNO and Azlan Yusof, who hails from the Pakatan Rakyat component Pan-Malaysian Islamic Party.

This by-election is viewed as critical by both the government and opposition. A win by Pakatan Rakyat would have resulted in a hung parliament with both coalition holding 16 seats, and potentially a fresh state election.

The by-election was won by BN's Tengku Zaihan with a slightly increased majority, thus keeping the government's wafer-thin 2-seat majority. Turnout in this by-election dropped by 7% compared to the turnout during the general election two months before.

== Results ==
Terengganu state by-election, 24 July 2013: Kuala Besut The by-election was called due to the death of incumbent, Abdul Rahman Mokhtar.
Party	Candidate	Votes	%	∆%
BN	Tengku Zaihan Che Ku Abdul Rahman	8,288	59.27	
PAS	Azlan Yusof	5,696	40.73	
Total valid votes		13,984	100.00	
Total rejected ballots		125		
Unreturned ballots		0		
Turnout		14,109	79.79	
Registered electors		17,683		
Majority		2,592		
BN hold		Swing		
Source(s) "Pilihan Raya Kecil N.01 Kuala Besut". Election Commission of Malaysia. "Federal Government Gazette - Notice of Contested Election - By-election of the State Legislative Assembly of N.01 Kuala Besut for the State of Terengganu [P.U. (B) 290/2013]" (PDF). Attorney General's Chambers of Malaysia. 16 July 2013. "Federal Government Gazette - Results of Contested Election and Statement of the Poll after the Official Addition of Votes for the By-election of N.01 Kuala Besut [P.U. (B) 325/2013]" (PDF). Attorney General's Chambers of Malaysia. 1 August 2013.
