= Kampung Raja =

Mukim in Besut, Terengganu, Malaysia

Kampung Raja Kapong Ghajo
- Town
- Kampung Raja in Besut District

- Location of Kuala Besut in Terengganu Kampung Raja (Malaysia)
- Coordinates: 5°47′43″N 102°33′51″E
- Country: Malaysia
- State: Terengganu
- District: Besut

Government
  - Type: District council
  - Body: Besut District Council
- Time zone: UTC+8 (Malaysian Standard Time)

Kampung Raja (Kelantan Malay: Kapong Ghajo), also known as Kota Putera, is a mukim and capital of Besut District, Terengganu, Malaysia. It is one of the mukim in Besut and also the central administration here. A long time ago, a king lived here and his castle was built here, but now the castle has been moved to Muzium Kuala Terengganu and only an old castle that remained here called Istana Tengku Long. Although located in Terengganu, the people there speak Kelantanese Malay and are culturally Kelantanese, owing to its close proximity to Kelantan.

== Climate ==
Kampung Raja has a tropical rainforest climate (Af) with moderate rainfall from February to May and heavy to very heavy rainfall in the remaining months.

Climate data for Kampung Raja
Month	Jan	Feb	Mar	Apr	May	Jun	Jul	Aug	Sep	Oct	Nov	Dec	Year
Mean daily maximum °C (°F)	28.6 (83.5)	29.5 (85.1)	30.9 (87.6)	32.0 (89.6)	32.4 (90.3)	32.0 (89.6)	31.6 (88.9)	31.4 (88.5)	31.3 (88.3)	30.6 (87.1)	29.3 (84.7)	28.6 (83.5)	30.7 (87.2)
Daily mean °C (°F)	25.4 (77.7)	25.9 (78.6)	26.8 (80.2)	27.7 (81.9)	28.1 (82.6)	27.8 (82.0)	27.4 (81.3)	27.3 (81.1)	27.2 (81.0)	26.9 (80.4)	26.2 (79.2)	25.8 (78.4)	26.9 (80.4)
Mean daily minimum °C (°F)	22.3 (72.1)	22.4 (72.3)	22.7 (72.9)	23.5 (74.3)	23.8 (74.8)	23.6 (74.5)	23.2 (73.8)	23.2 (73.8)	23.1 (73.6)	23.2 (73.8)	23.2 (73.8)	23.0 (73.4)	23.1 (73.6)
Average rainfall mm (inches)	264 (10.4)	118 (4.6)	126 (5.0)	79 (3.1)	124 (4.9)	142 (5.6)	128 (5.0)	196 (7.7)	233 (9.2)	292 (11.5)	537 (21.1)	621 (24.4)	2,860 (112.5)
Source: Climate-Data.org
