= Redang Island =

Island in Kuala Nerus, Terengganu, Malaysia

Native name: Pulau Redang ڤولاو رداڠ
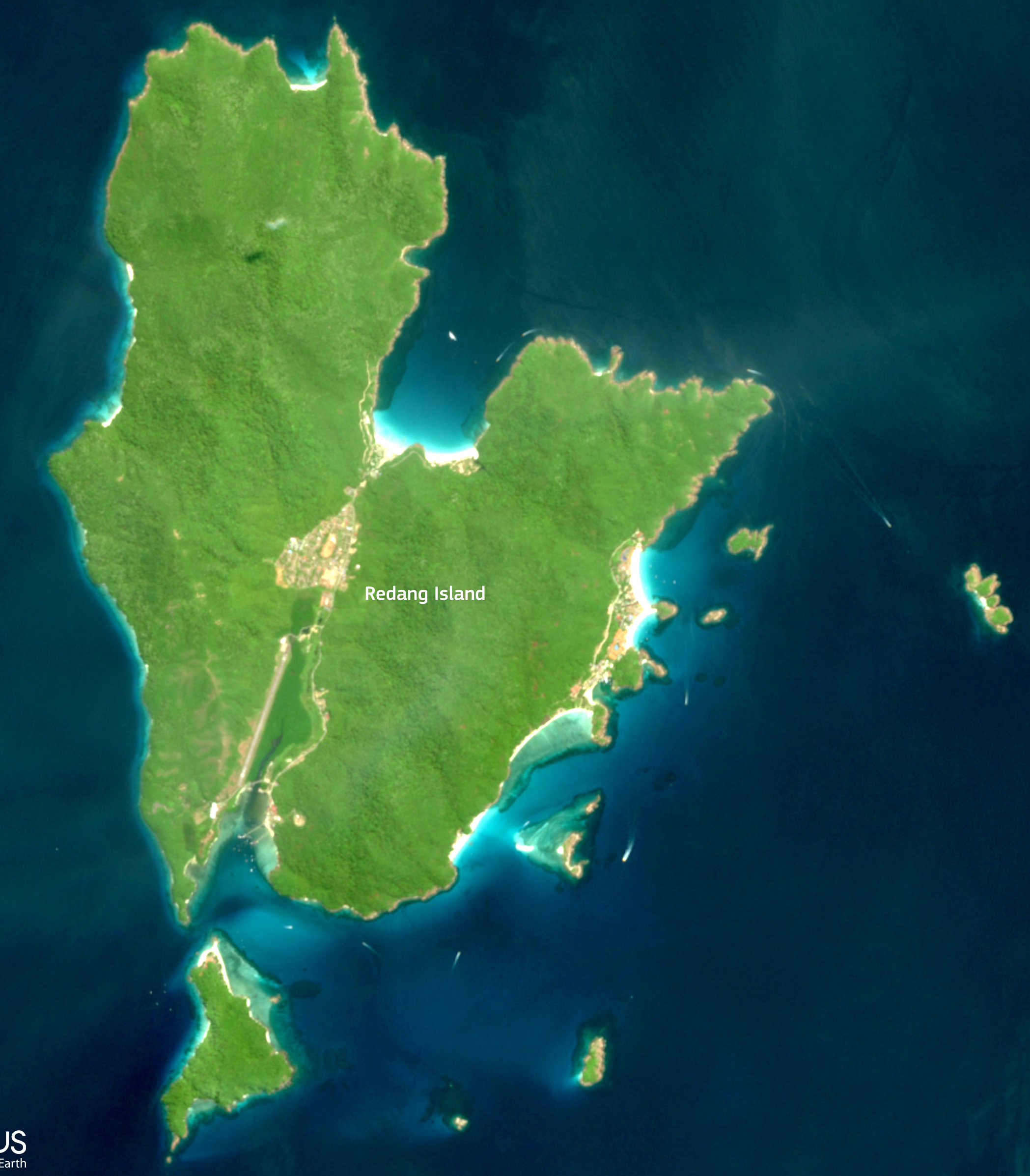
- A Sentinel-2 satellite image of the island.
- Interactive map of Redang Island

Geography
- Location: South China Sea
- Coordinates: 5°46′30″N 103°0′54″E
- Archipelago: Redang Islands
- Area: 24.2 km^{2} (9.3 sq mi)
- Highest elevation: 359 m (1178 ft)
- Highest point: Bukit Besar

Administration
- Malaysia
- State: Terengganu
- District: Kuala Nerus
- Mukim: Redang Islands

Demographics
- Population: 1,657 (2020)
- Languages: Malaysian Malay, Terengganu Malay
- Ethnic groups: Malays

Additional information
- Time zone: MST (UTC+8)
- Postal code: 21090

Redang Island (Malay: Pulau Redang, Terengganu Malay: Pula Redang) is an island in Kuala Nerus District, Terengganu, Malaysia. It is one of the largest islands off the east coast of Peninsular Malaysia. It is one of nine islands that make up an eponymous marine sanctuary park offering snorkeling and diving opportunities for tourists.

== Geography ==
Geographically, Redang Island has an area of about 24 square kilometres (9 1/4 square miles) and measures about seven kilometres (4 1/2 mi) long and six kilometres (3 1/2 mi) wide. Its highest peak is Bukit Besar at 359 metres (1,178 feet) above sea level.

For land administration purpose, 18 islands including Redang Island form the Redang Islands Mukim of the Kuala Nerus District. Of these, seven islands were protected and gazetted as marine parks by the Department of Fisheries and zoned two nautical miles (four kilometres) from the shore at lowest tide. As with other mukims of Kuala Nerus District, it was a part of the Kuala Terengganu District until 2014.

| Island | Area (km^{2}) |
|---|---|
| Redang^{[a]} | 24.200 |
| Bidong | 2.440 |
| Lang Tengah^{[a]} | 1.304 |
| Pinang^{[a]} | 0.756 |
| Geluk | 0.145 |
| Yu Besar^{[a]} | 0.127 |
| Kapak | 0.117 |
| Lima^{[a]} | 0.093 |
| Ekor Tebu^{[a]} | 0.056 |
| Yu Kecil^{[a]} | 0.055 |
| Paku Besar | 0.052 |
| Kerengga Besar | 0.037 |
| Tengkorak | 0.017 |
| Batu Bara | 0.013 |
| Paku Kecil | 0.012 |
| Kerengga Kecil | 0.007 |
| Ling | 0.006 |
| Cipu | 0.004 |
| Total | 29.441 |

Note: ^[a]Islands designated as marine parks.

== Tourism ==
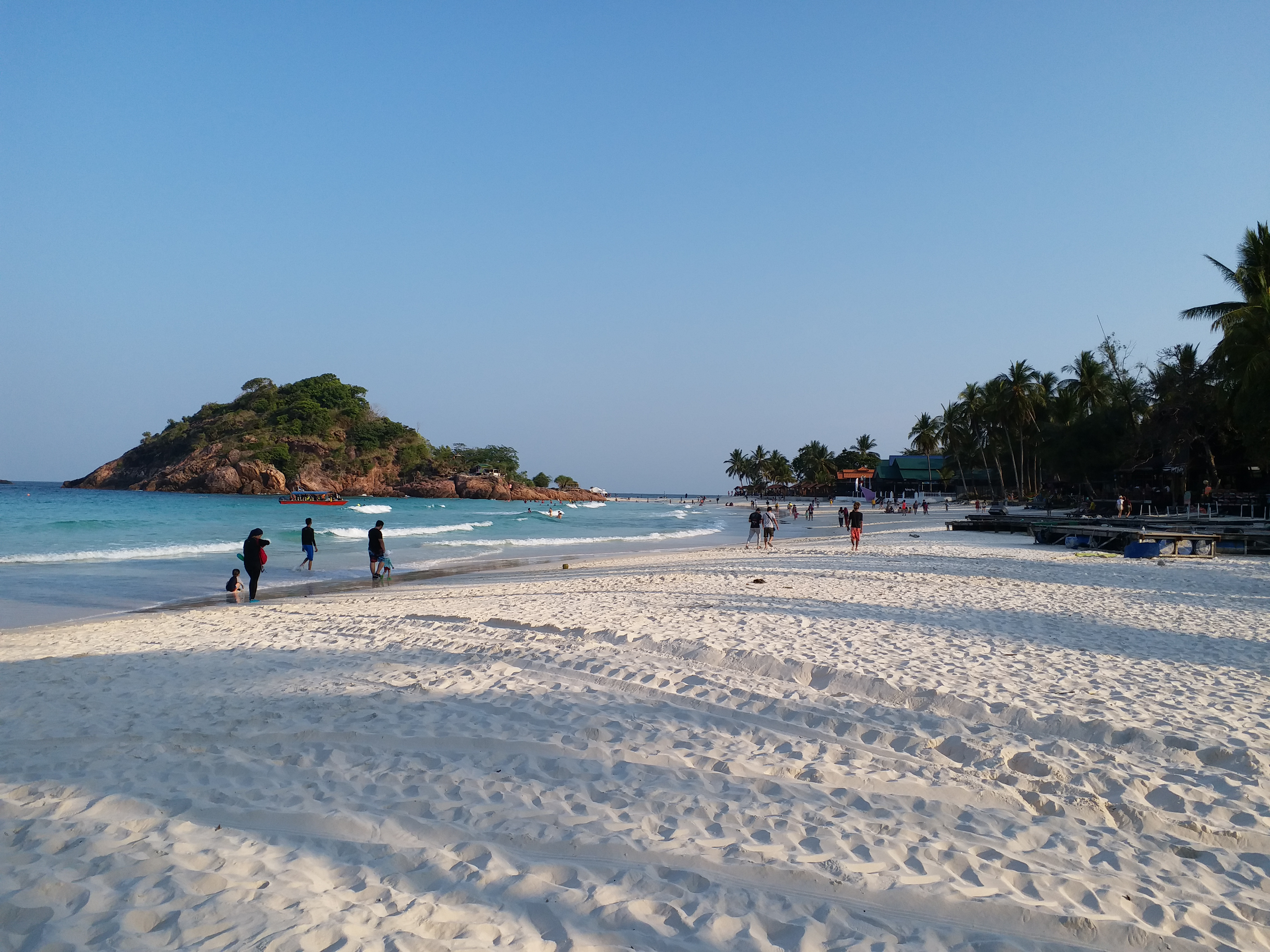
A beach in Pulau Redang during sunset.

In contrast to the neighbouring Perhentian Islands, Redang has a more upmarket image, as almost all accommodation on the island is resort-based. The largest beach is Pasir Panjang on the east side, featuring half a dozen resorts. The beach is covered with soft white sand. Coral and fish can be seen just a few metres from the beach. The other beach resorts are located in Teluk Dalam on the north and Teluk Kalong to the south.

The 2000 film, Summer Holiday was filmed on the Laguna Redang Island Resort, and a replica of the tea house now serves as the resort's gift shop.

The island is a turtle nesting site, and these turtles serve as a draw for ecotourism.

== Climate ==
Redang has a tropical climate with temperatures steadily around 30 °C (86 °F) and frequent but brief thunderstorms. Like the rest of Malaysia's east coast, Redang is affected by the northeast monsoon from the South China Sea, so most resorts are closed and ferry transport schedules are severely restricted between October and March. The amount of monthly rainfall varies throughout the year, with November to February being the wettest months, whilst April to August being the driest. The island experiences on average about 2,600 millimetres (100 in) of rain per year.

Climate data for Pulau Redang
| Month | Jan | Feb | Mar | Apr | May | Jun | Jul | Aug | Sep | Oct | Nov | Dec | Year |
|---|---|---|---|---|---|---|---|---|---|---|---|---|---|
| Record high °C (°F) | 32.9 (91.2) | 34.5 (94.1) | 34.8 (94.6) | 35.5 (95.9) | 35.8 (96.4) | 35.5 (95.9) | 34.9 (94.8) | 35.5 (95.9) | 35.2 (95.4) | 34.0 (93.2) | 33.7 (92.7) | 32.3 (90.1) | 35.8 (96.4) |
| Mean daily maximum °C (°F) | 29.7 (85.5) | 30.5 (86.9) | 31.5 (88.7) | 32.7 (90.9) | 33.1 (91.6) | 32.7 (90.9) | 32.3 (90.1) | 32.2 (90.0) | 31.9 (89.4) | 31.5 (88.7) | 30.0 (86.0) | 29.3 (84.7) | 31.5 (88.6) |
| Daily mean °C (°F) | 26.3 (79.3) | 26.6 (79.9) | 27.2 (81.0) | 27.9 (82.2) | 28.0 (82.4) | 27.5 (81.5) | 27.3 (81.1) | 27.0 (80.6) | 26.9 (80.4) | 26.7 (80.1) | 26.3 (79.3) | 26.2 (79.2) | 27.0 (80.6) |
| Mean daily minimum °C (°F) | 23.7 (74.7) | 23.3 (73.9) | 23.7 (74.7) | 24.1 (75.4) | 24.3 (75.7) | 24.0 (75.2) | 23.7 (74.7) | 23.6 (74.5) | 23.6 (74.5) | 23.7 (74.7) | 23.7 (74.7) | 23.8 (74.8) | 23.8 (74.8) |
| Record low °C (°F) | 19.7 (67.5) | 19.4 (66.9) | 19.8 (67.6) | 22.5 (72.5) | 21.3 (70.3) | 21.2 (70.2) | 20.9 (69.6) | 21.0 (69.8) | 21.2 (70.2) | 21.2 (70.2) | 21.3 (70.3) | 20.8 (69.4) | 19.4 (66.9) |
| Average precipitation mm (inches) | 124.6 (4.91) | 73.5 (2.89) | 162.5 (6.40) | 87.0 (3.43) | 104.0 (4.09) | 116.5 (4.59) | 105.1 (4.14) | 137.5 (5.41) | 188.2 (7.41) | 224.3 (8.83) | 732.0 (28.82) | 534.8 (21.06) | 2,590 (101.98) |
| Average precipitation days | 16 | 8 | 10 | 9 | 10 | 11 | 10 | 13 | 15 | 19 | 23 | 22 | 166 |
| Average relative humidity (%) | 81 | 81 | 82 | 82 | 83 | 83 | 83 | 84 | 84 | 85 | 87 | 84 | 83 |
Source: Malaysian Meteorological Department

== Transportation ==
By sea, access to the island is from Merang or Shahbandar jetty on boats operated by the resorts. For air travel, Berjaya Air is available for charter flights to the island from both Subang Airport and Singapore's Seletar Airport. Redang Airport, the island's primary STOL airport lies to the south of the island.

== Features ==
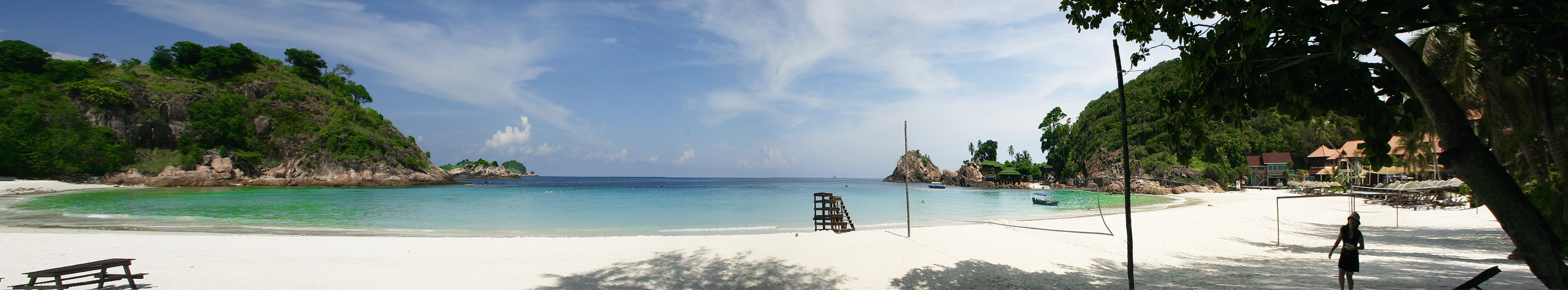

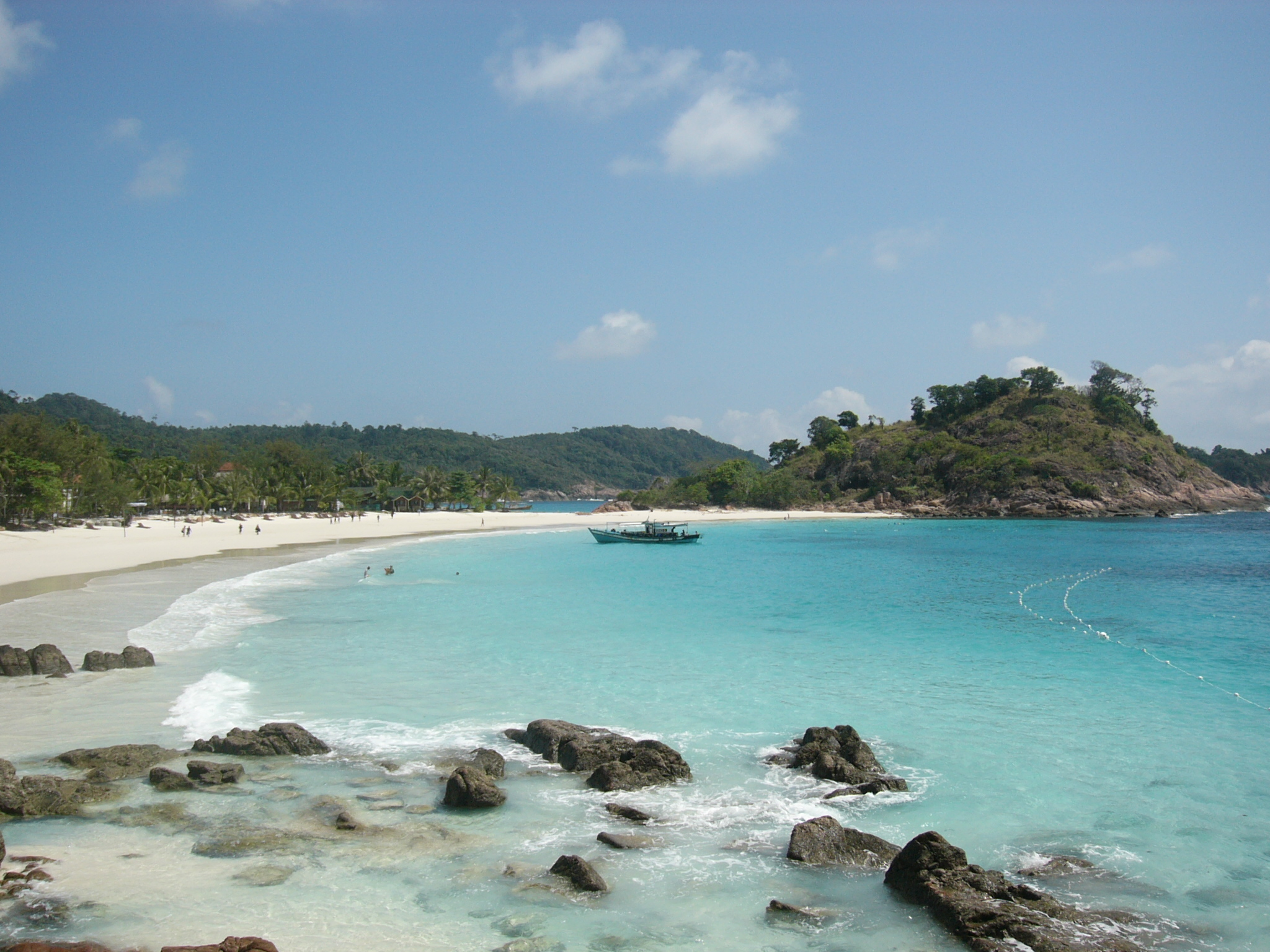
Pasir Panjang beach on Redang Island.

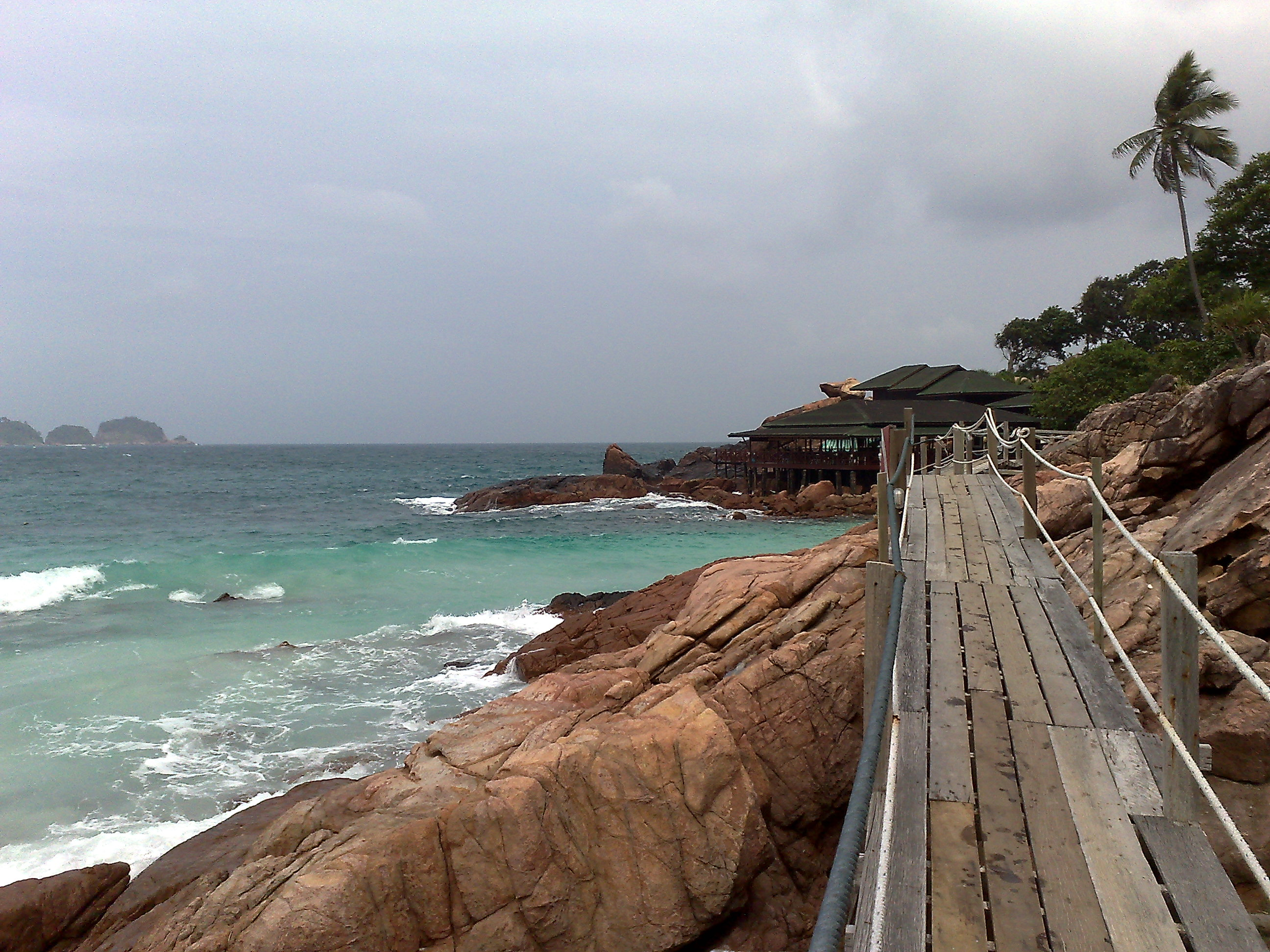
A rocky beach and a wooden bridge near Laguna Redang Resort on Redang Island.

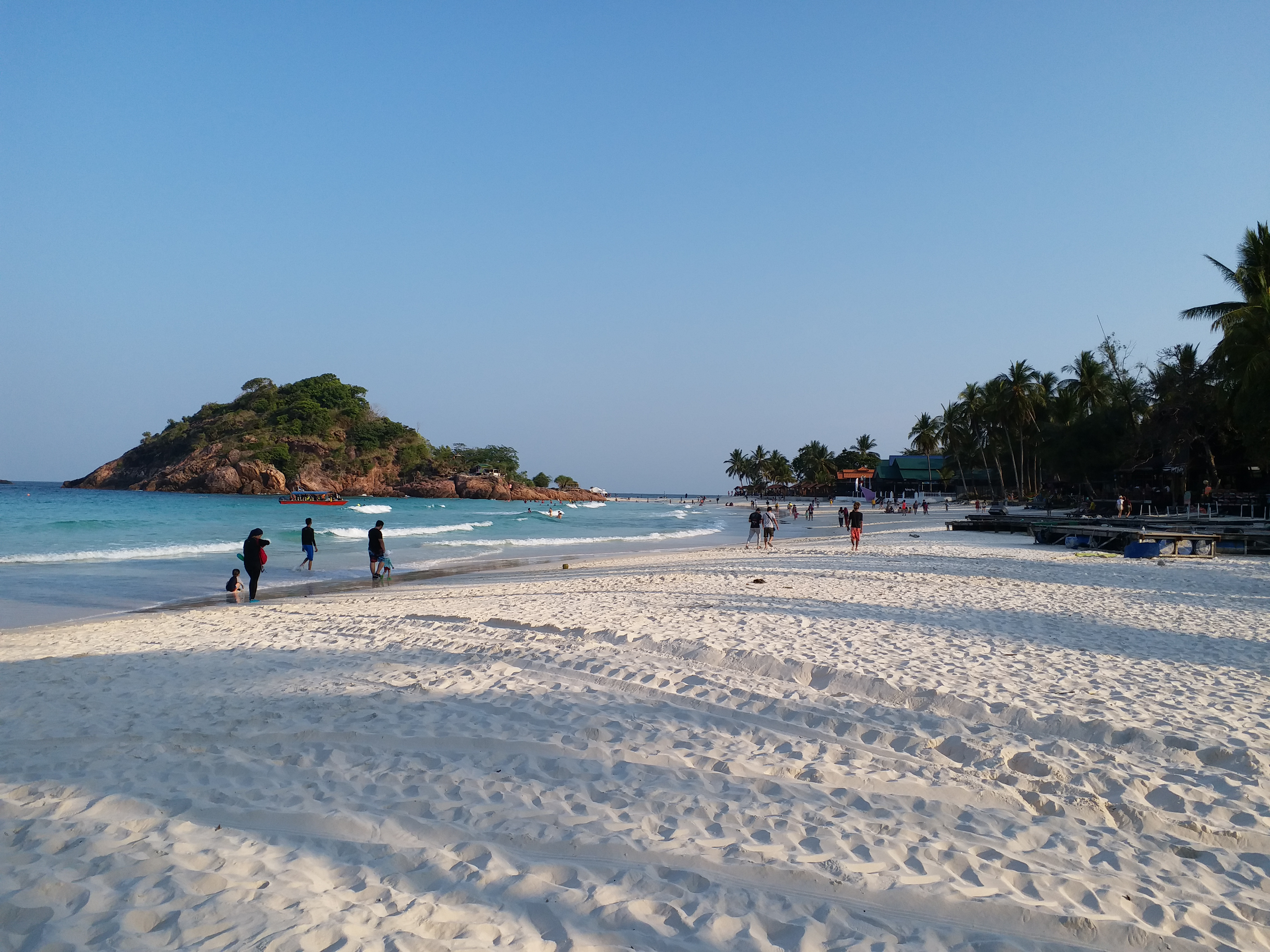
White sandy beach on Redang Island.

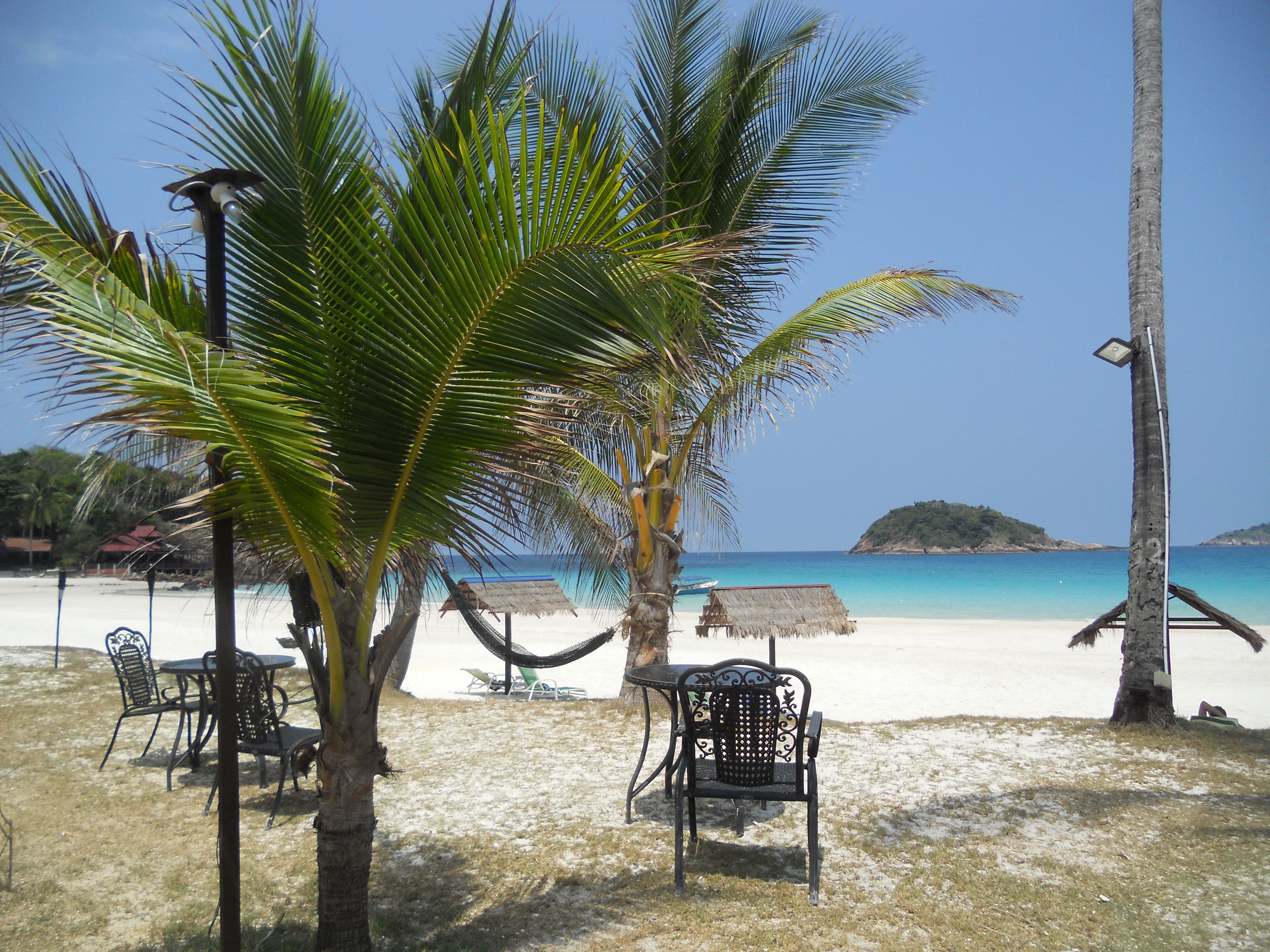
White sand beach with turquoise water on Redang Island.

== See also ==
- Redang Airport
- List of islands of Malaysia
- List of islands in the South China Sea
