= Bachok District =

- District of Kelantan
- Jajahan Bachok
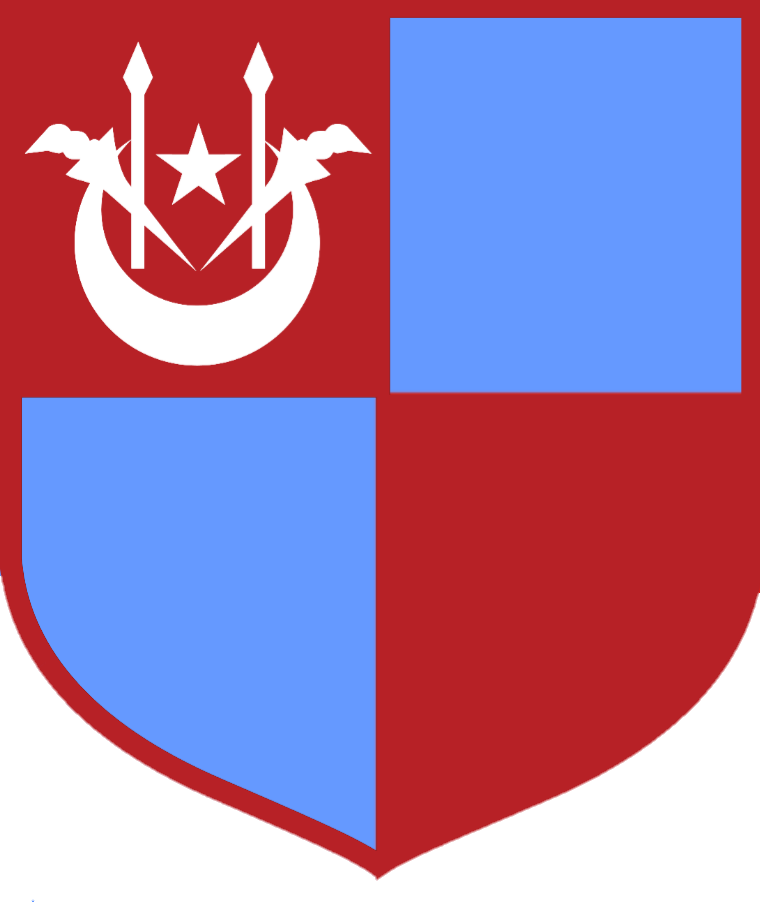
- Flag Seal Coat of arms

- Location of Bachok District in Kelantan
- Interactive map of Bachok District
- Location of Bachok District in Malaysia Bachok District (Southeast Asia)
- Coordinates: 6°0′N 102°22′E
- Country: Malaysia
- State: Kelantan
- Seat: Bachok
- Local area government(s): Bachok Islamic Tourism City District Council

Government
  - District officer: Haji Azi Rahimee Bin Haji Mohamed
  - Administrative office: Bachok Land and District Office

Area
  - Total: 279 km^{2} (108 sq mi)

Population (2021)
  - Total: 158,900
  - Density: 570/km^{2} (1,500/sq mi)
- Time zone: UTC+8 (MST)
  - Summer (DST): UTC+8 (Not observed)
- Postcode: 16xxx
- Calling code: +6-09
- Vehicle registration plates: D

Bachok District (Kelantanese: Jajahey Bachok) is an administrative division (or jajahan) of Kelantan, Malaysia. It is located approximately 25 km east of Kota Bharu.

The population is predominantly Malay, with Chinese and Siamese minorities. Bachok Town is the center of administration, business, and transportation of the district. The economy is mostly supported by agriculture, with significant fishing activity as well.

Bachok Town or Bandar Bachok was recently declared an Islamic Tourism Town or Bandar Pelancongan Islam by the incumbent Menteri Besar of Kelantan, Tuan Guru Hj. Datuk Nik Abdul Aziz Nik Mat effective 7 December 2010.

== Name origin ==
The origin of the name "Bachok" has several versions.

One version claims Bachok was named after a person named Tok Bachok, who people believed to be the first settler in the area. Traders from China traveled to Pengkalan Cina of Bachok to trade silk and spices.

The popular version of the name's origin, according to local inhabitants, originates from two Siamese words, Ban and Chak: Ban means village and Chak means nipa (a native mangrove plant). The local Siamese call the place Ban Chak, referring to the more populated and possibly earlier settlement immediately to the south of Bachok Town, the actual Kampung Nipah today. Bachok Town was possibly part of the larger Kampung Nipah then. The pronunciation of Ban Chak was later invariably changed to Bachok to suit the local Malay accent.

== Administrative divisions ==
Map of Bachok District

In exercise of the powers conferred by subsection 4 (3) of the Local Government Act 1976, the State Authority in consultation with the Minister of Housing and Local Government and the Secretary of the Election Commission hereby after the boundaries of Bachok District Council as the areas specified in the Schedule.

District	Sub District	Area (km^{2})	Malay	Chinese	Others	Chieftain
Perupok	Perupok	-	-	-	-	-
Perupok	Kemasin	6	-	-	-	-
Perupok	Nipah	2	-	-	-	-
Perupok	Paya Mengkuang	4	-	-	-	-
Perupok	Bandar Bachok	3	-	-	-	-
Gunong	Bator	19	-	-	-	-
Gunong	Gunong	19	-	-	-	-
Gunong	Kubang Telaga	10	-	-	-	Selli Kodir
Gunong	Tepus	9	-	-	-	-
Gunong	Jelawat	2	-	-	-	-
Tanjong Pauh	Tanjung Pauh	4	-	-	-	-
Tanjong Pauh	Pak Pura	8	-	-	-	-
Tanjong Pauh	Tanjung Jering	4	-	-	-	-
Mahligai	Alor Bakat	8	-	-	-	-
Mahligai	Mak Lipah	4	-	-	-	-
Mahligai	Serdang	7	-	-	-	-
Melawi	Melawi	6	-	-	-	-
Melawi	Repek	15	-	-	-	-
Melawi	Rusa	16	-	-	-	-
Melawi	Kuau	4	-	-	-	-
Tawang	Gajah Mati	6	-	-	-	Zulkifli Awang 'To
Tawang	Pauh Sembilan	12	2,634	-	-	Mohd Noor Awang Lah
Tawang	Senak	10	2,634	-	-	Yusoff Mohamed
Tawang	Telok Mesira	7	2,634	-	-	Mat Jusoh bin Latiff
Tawang	Tanjong	5	2,634	-	-	Abdul Hamid Zakaria
Telong	Telong	36	-	-	-	-
Telong	Lubuk Tembesu	28	-	-	-	Ramli bin Awang
Bekelam	Chap	6	2,634	-	-	Mat Jusoh bin Latiff
Bekelam	Cherang Hangus	3	1,525	190	-	Hj. Nawawi bin hanafi
Bekelam	Kuchelong	7	3,019	-	-	Mohd Yusof bin Awang
Bekelam	Temu Ranggas	5	2,602	-	-	Marjan bin Mohamad Nawi
Bekelam	Tualang Salak	3	1,512	-	-	Manan bin Hamzah

== Demographics ==
Historical population
Year	Pop.	±%
1991	98,557	—
2000	109,384	+11.0%
2010	126,350	+15.5%
2020	157,288	+24.5%

== Federal Parliament and State Assembly Seats ==
List of Bachok district representatives in the Federal Parliament (Dewan Rakyat)

Parliament	Seat Name	Member of Parliament	Party	Election Year
P25	Bachok	Nik Mohamad Abduh Nik Abd Aziz	(PAS)	2018
P25	Bachok	Mohd Syahrir Che Sulaiman	Perikatan Nasional (PAS)	2022

List of Bachok district representatives in the State Legislative Assembly.

Parliament	State	Seat Name	State Assemblyman	Party
P25	N20	Tawang	Hassan Mohamood	Perikatan Nasional (PAS)
P25	N21	Pantai Irama	Mohd Huzaimy Che Husin	Perikatan Nasional (PAS)
P25	N22	Jelawat	Abdul Azziz Kadir	Perikatan Nasional (PAS)

== Economy ==
=== Kenaf Plantation ===
Kenaf (Hibiscus cannabinus) is a tropical plant of the mallow family that yields a fiber resembling jute that can be used for the production of cordage and textiles. Kenaf can be harvested after 120 days and its planting cycle is three seasons annually.

According to the National Tobacco Board, the pioneer batch of Kenaf-growing farmers in Kelantan has proven that the crop is a good alternative to tobacco which has become less competitive in the plantation industry. It is expected to export 50,000 tonnes of Kenaf annually, valued at RM15 billion. He said that this would make Kenaf the country's major commodity by 2010, adding that the Republic of Korea is expected to be the first importing country for Malaysia Kenaf, at 50,000 tonnes a year.

The Kenaf-planting project, which is capable of producing 15,000 tonnes of Kenaf per hectare, provides tobacco farmers an alternative source of income when the AFTA is enforced. Under the project's initial phase, some 1,000 hectares of land would be planted with Kenaf including 700 hectares in Kelantan. Two Kenaf-processing mills were constructed at Air Tawar in Pasir Puteh and Beris Lalang (Bachok). The mill which is equipped with RM600,000 worth of machinery can process 10 tonnes of Kenaf during eight hours of operations daily. The processed Kenaf is exported to Germany and Korea.

Area	Number of Farmers	Area (Km2)
Telaga Ara	8	15
Gelong Badak	23	20
Seneng	15	30
Gong Gajah	5	10
Total Bachok District	51	75

== Healthcare Facilities ==
Hospital Bachok

Bachok Hospital commenced operations in November and it is beneficial for both the residents and health workers. The development and completion of the hospital were in line with the 12th Malaysia Plan's goal of streamlining healthcare services in the country. The hospital was equipped, among other things, with 76 beds, two operating theatres, specialist clinics, a maternity ward, an emergency department, and administrative and training units.

Healthcare Clinics & Rural Clinics

The district was served by multiple Healthcare clinics and rural clinics:

- Healthcare Clinics - There are 6 Healthcare clinics around the districts including Bachok, Balai, Beris, Beris Panchor, Gunong & Mahligai
- Rural Clinics - There are 23 rural clinics serving the communities within the district

== Places of interest ==
=== Pantai Irama ( The Beach of Melody) ===
This beach is facing the South China Sea with wide and long sandy beach. Pantai Irama (Beach of Melody) is popular among the locals and visitors and hence, during the weekends (Friday and Saturday), the beach will be packed with family and children. It is also a common place to hold concerts and events. It is situated along the main road of Bachok, Kota Bahru.

=== Pantai Kemayang ===
This beach is facing the South China Sea and is only 14 kilometres from Kota Bharu. It is connected by a good road network and has public toilets, a surau and various eateries. Most of its visitors are families but singles come here as well.

=== Bukit Marak ===
Bukit Marak (literally Shining Hill) is a village in Bachok, Kelantan, Malaysia, located about 24 kilometres (15 mi) south of the state capital Kota Bharu. It was the childhood home of Puteri Saadong, and thus has significance in the history of the Sultanate of Kelantan.

The village derives its name from a local hill, one of the last hillocks in the district. The hill has some attractions for tourists, and draws thousands of visitors every weekend both for hiking and for sightseeing. Among these are a pool in which Puteri Saadong was believed to have bathed, and three granite rocks at the peak of the hill resembling Puteri Saadong's favourite musical instrument. However, the hill is being negatively affected by excavation of soil for use in land reclamation; local villagers are said to be selling soil from the hill at RM40 for one lorry-load. Aside from the damage to the historical site, this also may introduce the danger of mudslides and landslides during the monsoon season. The state government has offered to purchase the hill from its owners in accordance with the National Heritage Act 2005, in order to prevent further damage.

=== Kandis Resource Centre ===
Founded by the late Rashiddin Nik Nik Hussein and formally established in 2000. KRC many treasures of art-oriented Malay carving art langkasuka tombstone grave, rehal, pulpit, wall decor, architecture mosques and palaces of the east coast of Malaysia and Patani, Thailand is unique with its own motives.

=== Kampung Balai ===
Kampung Balai is a village in Bachok located approximately 20 kilometers southeast of Kota Bharu. While ‘’Balai’’ means ‘’hall’’ in Malay, there is no known historical correlation between the village and ‘’hall’’. However, according to local inhabitants, “Balai” is derived from ‘’Ban Malai” or ‘’flower village’’ in Thai language. It is believed that the low-lying area where the rice field was, now planted with tobacco, was once a shallow lake filled with flowering lotus.

The Thais of this village are believed to be originated from central Thailand more than 200 years ago when Kelantan was a tributary of the Kingdom of Siam. Their spoken Thai language is distinctly different from other Thais in Kelantan who generally speak the southern “Tak Bai” Thai language.

The village was most probably opened by these Thais or the Chinese.

The Chinese, mostly from Fujian, China came to the village probably at the same time with the Thais to develop the village. Some of the Chinese are of eighth or ninth generation descendants. Virtually all of them have lost contact with their ancestral roots in China. Demographics

The lingua franca among the villagers is mainly Thai although all the Chinese and most of the Thais could also speak, to some degree of competency, Kelantan Hokkien (Min Nan). All of them are fluent Malay speakers and some, especially the younger generation, could converse in Mandarin as well. They are predominantly Buddhists. The Chinese also observe traditional Chinese practices.

There are three Buddhist temples in the village, i.e. Wat Phathumviharn, Wat Phithikyan Phutthaktham and a Kuan Yin temple located at seaside facing the South China Sea.

==== Wat Phithikyan Phutthaktham ====
It is better known simply as Wat Balai or Dragon Temple to the locals, on account of the pair of dragons flanking the entrance.

Wat Phothikyan Phutthaktham began as a modest temple some twenty years ago. It became more active when a Thai came over and started various activities, including initiating a building fund for the temple. As a result, it underwent massive expansion in recent years, including the construction of a 100-foot tall statue of a standing Buddha. Other sights at Wat Phothikyan Phutthaktham include the wishing three, where devotees threw their wishes onto its branches, and the seated Buddha image behind a seven-headed naga.

The small towns of Beris Kubor Besar (kg Pak Pura), Perupok, Jelawat and Wakaf Zin have wet markets and competitive grocery prices.

== Education ==
=== Tertiary Education ===
- Universiti Malaysia Kelantan
- Islamic College of Science & Technology (Malay: Kolej Islam, Sains dan Teknologi (KIST))
- Institute of Ocean and Earth Sciences ('IOES') Bachok Marine Research Station - is established in 2012. Built on a land area of 3 hectares, the station fronts the open sea (South China Sea) and is partially bounded by the narrow Rekang River. It is also an hour away from Perhentian Island, which is ideal for coral reef studies
- Institut Kemahiran Belia Negara Daerah Bachok
- Pusat Giatmara Daerah Bachok
- Pejabat Pelajaran Daerah Bachok

=== Pondok Institutions ===
- Pusat Pengajian Pondok Kg Telong, Kandis
- Madrasah Islahiyah, Pondok Kuin Pasir

=== Secondary Education ===
- Sek. Men. Keb. Bachok
- Sek. Men. Keb. Badak
- Sek. Men. Keb. Beris Panchor
- Sek. Men. Keb. Dato' Perdana
- Sek. Men. Keb. Jelawat
- Sek. Men. Keb. Kandis
- Sek. Men. Keb. Kubang Telaga
- Sek. Men. Keb. Long Yunus
- Sek. Men. Keb. Pak Badol
- Sek. Men. Keb. Putri Saadong
- Sek. Men. Keb. Sri Gunong
- Sek. Men. Keb. Sri Nipah
- Sek. Men. Keb. Teknik Bachok
- Sek. Men . Keb. Kubang golok

==== Secondary Religious School ====
- Sek. Men. Keb. Agama Tok Bachok
- Maahad Amir Indra Petra
- Sek. Men. Ugama Yaakubiah
- Sek. Men. Ugama Muhammadiah
- Sek. Men. Ugama Al Hidayah Islamiah
- Sek. Men. Ugama Beris Lalang

=== Primary Education ===
- Sek. Keb Seri Kemudi
- Sek. Keb Tangok
- Sek. Keb Alor Bakat
- Sek. Keb Bachok
- Sek. Keb Badak
- Sek. Keb Bakong
- Sek. Keb Bekelam
- Sek. Keb Beris Kubur Besar
- Sek. Keb Lalang
- Sek. Keb Beris Panchor
- Sek. Keb Bukit Marak
- Sek. Keb Chantum
- Sek. Keb Gunong
- Sek. Keb Jelawat
- Sek. Keb Kampong Chap
- Sek. Keb Kandis
- Sek. Keb Keting
- Sek. Keb Kolam]
- Sek. Keb Kubang Telaga
- Sek. Keb Kucelong
- Sek. Keb Pak Badol
- Sek. Keb Pa' Pura
- Sek. Keb Pantai Senak
- Sek. Keb Pauh Sembilan
- Sek. Keb Pengkalan Chengal
- Sek. Keb Perupok
- Sek. Keb Seneng
- Sek. Keb Sri Kemunting
- Sek. Keb Sungai Dua
- Sek. Keb Tanjong Jenera
- Sek. Keb Tawang
- Sek. Keb Telaga Ara
- Sek. Keb Pa'Pura

== Climate ==
Bachok has a tropical rainforest climate (Af) with moderate rainfall from February to May and heavy to very heavy rainfall in the remaining months.

Climate data for Bachok
Month	Jan	Feb	Mar	Apr	May	Jun	Jul	Aug	Sep	Oct	Nov	Dec	Year
Mean daily maximum °C (°F)	28.8 (83.8)	29.7 (85.5)	30.9 (87.6)	32.1 (89.8)	32.5 (90.5)	32.1 (89.8)	31.6 (88.9)	31.4 (88.5)	31.3 (88.3)	30.5 (86.9)	29.3 (84.7)	28.5 (83.3)	30.7 (87.3)
Daily mean °C (°F)	25.7 (78.3)	26.1 (79.0)	26.8 (80.2)	27.8 (82.0)	28.3 (82.9)	27.9 (82.2)	27.4 (81.3)	27.3 (81.1)	27.3 (81.1)	26.8 (80.2)	26.3 (79.3)	25.7 (78.3)	27.0 (80.5)
Mean daily minimum °C (°F)	22.6 (72.7)	22.5 (72.5)	22.8 (73.0)	23.6 (74.5)	24.1 (75.4)	23.8 (74.8)	23.3 (73.9)	23.3 (73.9)	23.3 (73.9)	23.2 (73.8)	23.3 (73.9)	23.0 (73.4)	23.2 (73.8)
Average rainfall mm (inches)	184 (7.2)	84 (3.3)	104 (4.1)	83 (3.3)	111 (4.4)	135 (5.3)	141 (5.6)	184 (7.2)	213 (8.4)	276 (10.9)	565 (22.2)	595 (23.4)	2,675 (105.3)
Source: Climate-Data.org

== Notable people ==
Actors

- Osman Kering

Government & Politics

- Annuar Musa
- Mustapa Mohamed
- Datuk Dr. Awang Adek Hussin

Writers

- Lim Swee Tin
