= Jelawat =

Suburb in Malaysia

Coordinates: 06°01′N 102°23′E

Jelawat is a suburb in Bachok district, Kelantan, Malaysia. According to 2020 census, Jelawat recorded a population of 792. The area of Jelawat is 0.2289 km^{2}.
