= Jerteh (town) =

Town in Besut, Terengganu, Malaysia

- Town and district capital
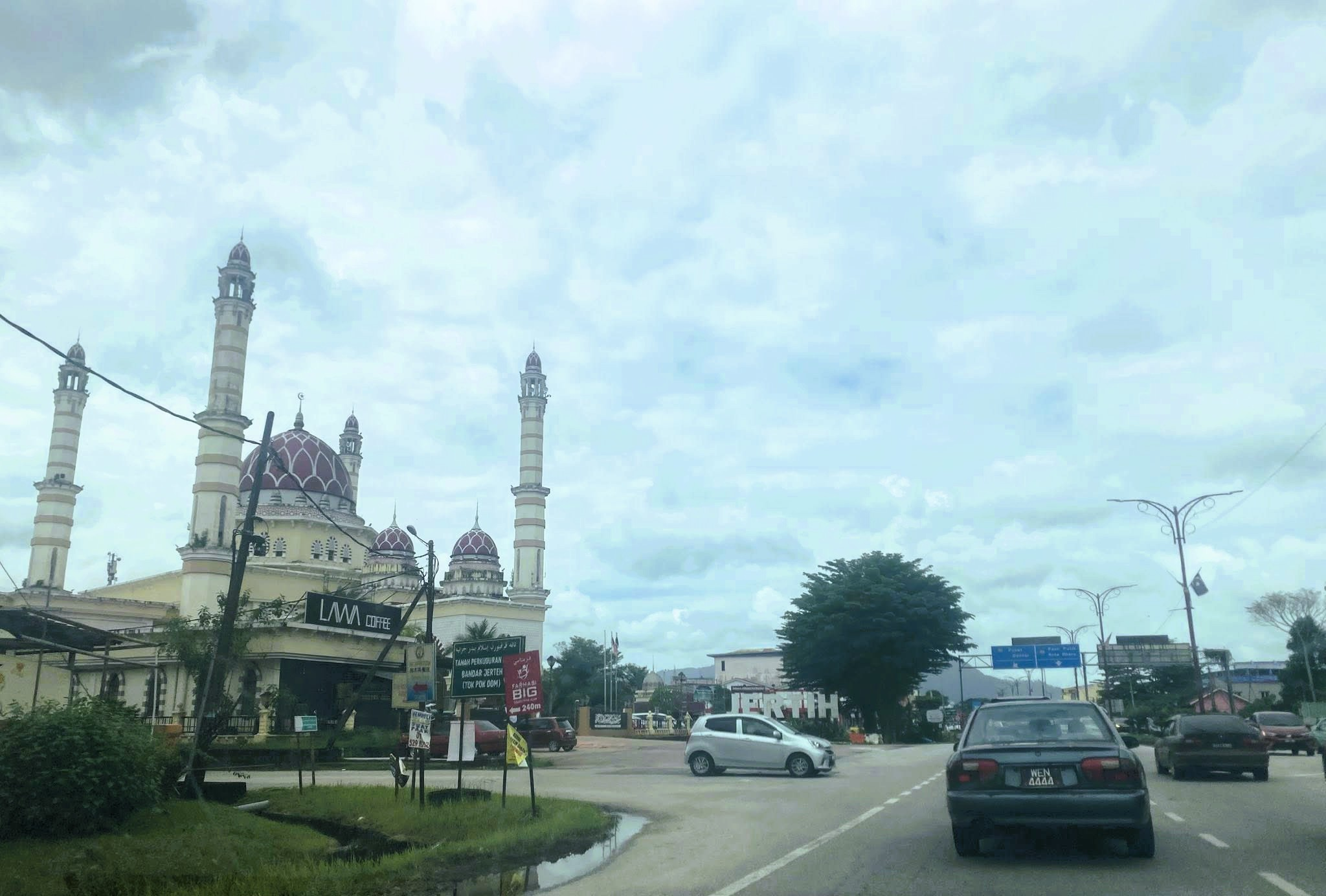
- View of Jerteh town with Hadhari Mosque to the left.
- Interactive map of Jerteh
- Location within Terengganu Location within Malaysia
- Coordinates: 5°44′59.99″N 102°29′59.99″E
- Country: Malaysia
- State: Terengganu
- District: Besut Terengganu

Government
  - Type: District council
  - Body: Besut Terengganu District Council

Jerteh (Jawi: جرتيه) also spell as Jertih is the most populous town in Besut District, Terengganu, Malaysia. Jerteh is located between Besut and Kuala Berang. It has been represented by Che Mohamad Zulkifly Jusoh since 2022 in Dewan Rakyat (Malaysian House of Representatives).

Jertih contains Hospital Besut, the largest hospital in Besut District.

== See also ==
- Felda Selasih
