= Besut District =

Besut District Besuk (Kelantan–Pattani and Terengganu Malay)
- District of Terengganu
- Daerah Besut
- Flag Seal
- Interactive map of Besut District
- Location of Besut District in Malaysia
- Coordinates: 5°35′N 102°30′E
- Country: Malaysia
- State: Terengganu
- Seat: Kampung Raja
- Local area government(s): Besut District Council

Government
  - District officer: Haji Rozali bin Salleh

Area
  - Total: 1,233.68 km^{2} (476.33 sq mi)

Population (2010)
  - Total: 140,952
  - Estimate (2020): 175,800
  - Density: 114.253/km^{2} (295.915/sq mi)
- Time zone: UTC+8 (MST)
  - Summer (DST): UTC+8 (Not observed)
- Postcode: 22xxx
- Calling code: +6-09-6
- Vehicle registration plates: T D

Besut (Terengganuan and Kelantanese: Besuk) is a Kelantanese community district in the Terengganu federal state of Malaysia. It is bordered by the state of Kelantan to the north and west and the South China Sea to the east. It is the northern gateway to Terengganu. Kampung Raja is the district capital, though Jerteh is more developed. Another major town is the fishing port of Kuala Besut. There are other small towns and villages such as Jabi, Apal, Pasir Akar and Tembila. Besut is between Jerteh and Kuala Terengganu.

== History ==
There is a lack of written evidence on this district. The records by Munshi Abdullah in his book, Kisah Pelayaran Abdullah ke Kelantan, and Tuhfat al-Nafis by Raja Ali Haji touched a bit on Besut. Due to this, there are many stories that tell the matters regarding the origin of Besut. There is a legend that recounts the tale of how Besut got its name. According to this story, when the region was under Siamese rule, the district was named "Besut" which originated from the Siamese word "Be" meaning "district" and "sut" which means "a distant area" or "at the end." This story could be plausible since Besut is located quite far from Bangkok.

=== Part of Kelantan-Patani Empire ===
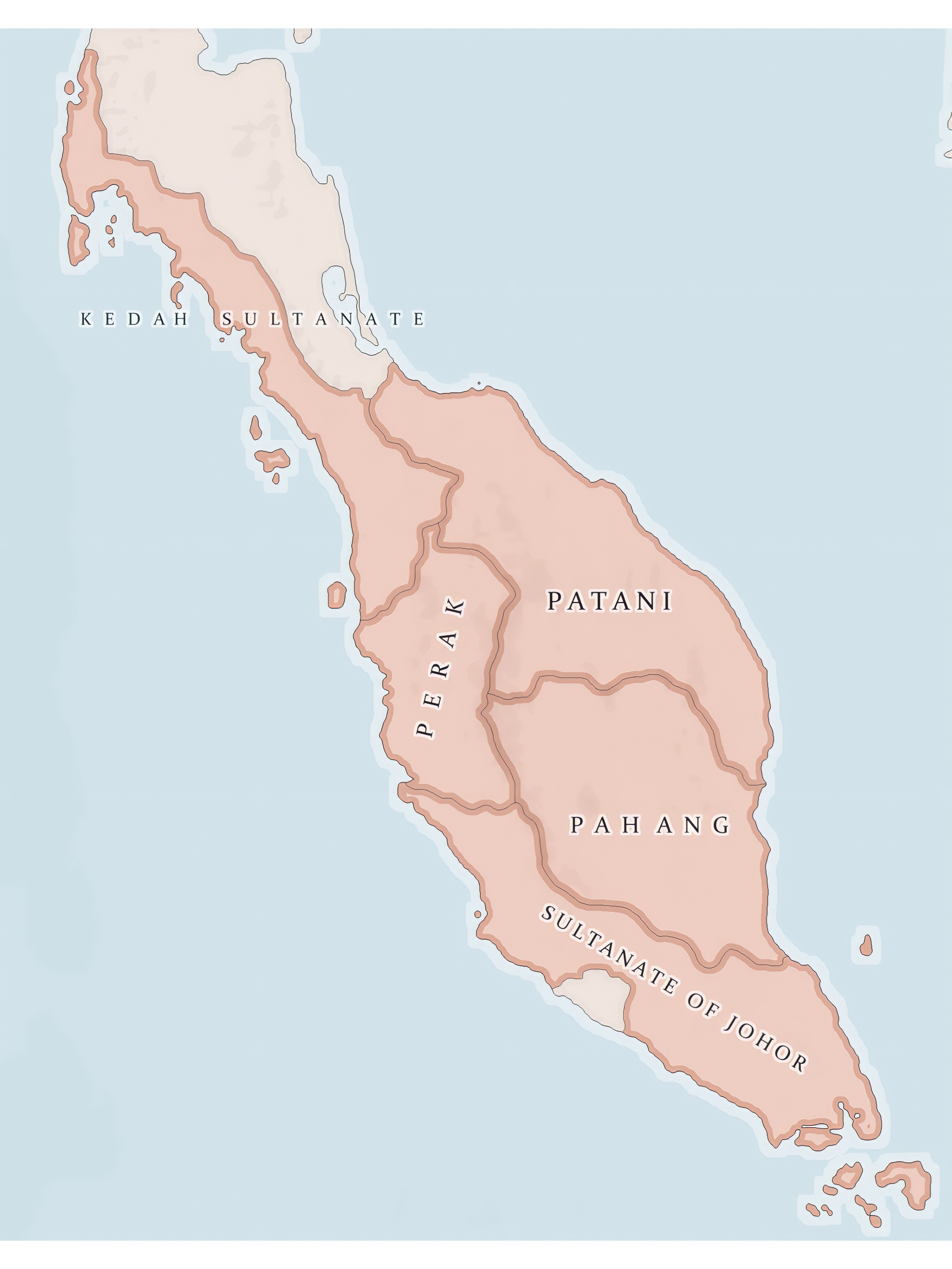
Map of the Kelantan-Patani Empire, before its collapse in 1785.

Besut was originally a land belonging to the Kelantan-Patani Sultanate. This can be proven through the reign of Raja Sakti I of Kelantan who united Patani under his administrative influence when the Ratu Kuning of Patani had died and had no heirs while Terengganu was under the protection of Kelantan-Patani. Kelantan's control over Besut only lasted 161 years when the Patani Sultanate was attacked by Siam in 1780 which caused Kelantan to split into two blocks namely East Kelantan and West Kelantan while Terengganu fled and took refuge with the Sultanate of Johore.

== Administrative divisions ==

Besut District is divided into 16 mukims, which are:

- Bukit Kenak
- Bukit Puteri
- Hulu Besut
- Jabi
- Kampung Raja
- Keluang
- Kerandang
- Kuala Besut
- Kubang Bemban
- Lubuk Kawah
- Pasir Akar
- Pelagat
- Pengkalan Nangka
- Perhentian Islands
- Tembila
- Tenang

== Population ==
Historical population
Year	Pop.	±%
1991	107,900	—
2000	120,199	+11.4%
2010	136,563	+13.6%
2020	154,168	+12.9%

As of 2010, there are approximately 140,952 people in Besut District, of various ethnicities, with the Malays being the majority. Other ethnic groups include Chinese and Siamese. Most Malays in Besut identify themselves with Kelantanese identity rather than the Terengganuan identity. One of the prominent examples is that they tend to speak Kelantanese Malay instead of Terengganu Malay like in most parts of Terengganu. Meanwhile, the dominant minority ethnic Chinese population are more concentrated near Jerteh town.

== Education ==
Besut has education institutions which are developed by both the central and Terengganu state governments such as, Universiti Sultan Zainal Abidin, Institute of Teacher's Education Sultan Mizan Campus, MARA Junior Science College (Kota Putra & Besut campuses), Kolej Komuniti Besut, Sekolah Menengah Kebangsaan Tengku Mahmud, Sekolah Menengah Agama Maarif, Sekolah Menengah Kebangsaan Agama Nurul Ittifaq, Madrasah Moden MAIDAM Besut and Sekolah Menengah IMTIAZ, Sekolah Menengah Agama Ittifakiah, among others. Hence, Besut is known as one of the best educational hub towns in Malaysia.

== Tourism ==
There are a number of travel destinations that are located here, many of them islands or beaches. The most popular of all tourist sites in Besut are Perhentian Islands, one of the top island destinations in the world according to the CNN. Perhentian Islands lie about 10.8 nautical miles (20 km) to the north east of Kuala Besut and are made up of islands such as Perhentian Besar, Perhentian Kecil, and Susu Dara. The islands are well known for their tropical reefs, scuba diving, and snorkeling.

Besides Perhentian Islands, beaches are also among the top local places to visit. The beaches here are Air Tawar, Dendong, and Bukit Keluang beach. In the interior parts of the district, visitors can experience the tropical forest in areas such as Lata Tembakah and Lata Belatan, or climb the 1039m-high Mount Tebu. Tourists can also enjoy bathing in the natural hot springs of Kolam Air Panas La or La Hot Springs. The water here contains sulphur and can reach 49 °C.

== Federal Parliament and State Assembly Seats ==
List of Besut district representatives in the Federal Parliament (Dewan Rakyat)

Parliament	Seat Name	Member of Parliament	Party
P33	Besut	Che Mohamad Zulkifly Jusoh	PN (PAS)
P34	Setiu	Shaharizukarnain Abd. Kadir	PN (PAS)

List of Besut district representatives in the State Legislative Assembly of Terengganu

Parliament	State	Seat Name	State Assemblyman	Party
P33	N1	Kuala Besut	Azbi Salleh	PN (PAS)
P33	N2	Kota Putera	Mohd. Nurkhuzaini Ab. Rahman	PN (PAS)
P33	N3	Jertih	Riduan Mohamad Nor	PN (PAS)
P33	N4	Hulu Besut	Mohd Husaimi Hussin	PN (BERSATU)
P34	N5	Jabi	Azman Ibrahim	PN (PAS)

== See also ==
- Districts of Malaysia
