= Kuala Besut =

Town and mukim in Besut, Terengganu, Malaysia

Kuala Besut Kole Besuk (Terengganu Malay) Kolo Besuk (Kelantan-Pattani Malay)
- Town

Other transcription(s)
  - Jawi: كوالا بسوت
  - Chinese: 瓜拉勿述 (Simplified); Guālā Wùshù (Hanyu Pinyin)
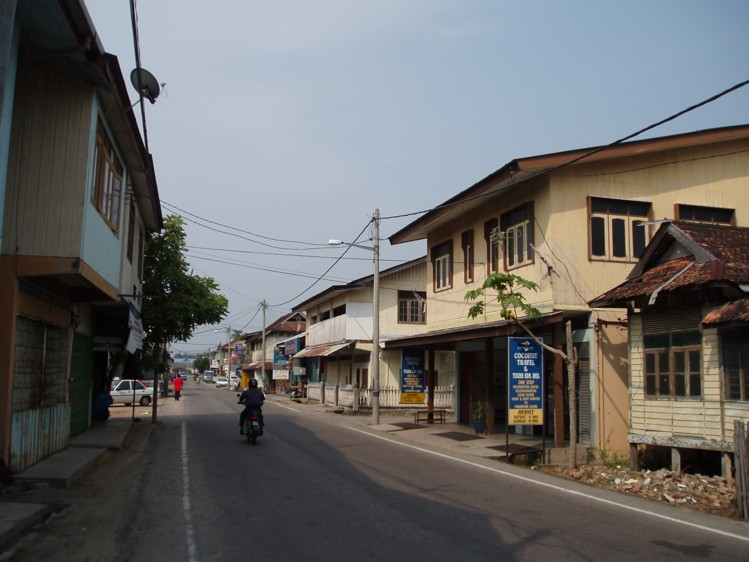

- Kuala Besut in Besut District

- Location of Kuala Besut in Terengganu Kuala Besut (Malaysia)
- Coordinates: 5°50′N 102°34′E
- Country: Malaysia
- State: Terengganu
- District: Besut

Government
  - Type: District council
  - Body: Besut District Council
- Time zone: UTC+8 (Malaysian Standard Time)

Kuala Besut is a mukim in Besut District, Terengganu, Malaysia.

It is the departure point for boats to the Perhentian Islands. There are a variety of tour operators that tourist can choose for getting to Perhentian Islands. Small shops selling souvenirs of Perhentian Islands are also available around the town.

== History ==
=== World War II ===
Imperial Japanese forces from Kota Bharu successfully invades Kuala Besut on 10 December 1942 in order to capture the airfield on Gong Kedak before proceeding to the capital of Terengganu.

== Climate ==
Kuala Besut has a tropical rainforest climate (Af) with moderate rainfall from February to May and heavy to very heavy to very heavy rainfall in the remaining months.

Climate data for Kuala Besut
Month	Jan	Feb	Mar	Apr	May	Jun	Jul	Aug	Sep	Oct	Nov	Dec	Year
Mean daily maximum °C (°F)	28.7 (83.7)	29.5 (85.1)	30.9 (87.6)	32.0 (89.6)	32.3 (90.1)	32.0 (89.6)	31.6 (88.9)	31.3 (88.3)	31.3 (88.3)	30.6 (87.1)	29.3 (84.7)	28.6 (83.5)	30.7 (87.2)
Daily mean °C (°F)	25.6 (78.1)	25.9 (78.6)	26.8 (80.2)	27.7 (81.9)	28.0 (82.4)	27.8 (82.0)	27.4 (81.3)	27.2 (81.0)	27.2 (81.0)	26.9 (80.4)	26.2 (79.2)	25.8 (78.4)	26.9 (80.4)
Mean daily minimum °C (°F)	22.5 (72.5)	22.4 (72.3)	22.8 (73.0)	23.5 (74.3)	23.8 (74.8)	23.6 (74.5)	23.2 (73.8)	23.2 (73.8)	23.1 (73.6)	23.2 (73.8)	23.2 (73.8)	23.0 (73.4)	23.1 (73.6)
Average rainfall mm (inches)	252 (9.9)	116 (4.6)	125 (4.9)	80 (3.1)	118 (4.6)	137 (5.4)	119 (4.7)	190 (7.5)	224 (8.8)	288 (11.3)	535 (21.1)	621 (24.4)	2,805 (110.3)
Source: Climate-Data.org

== Gallery ==
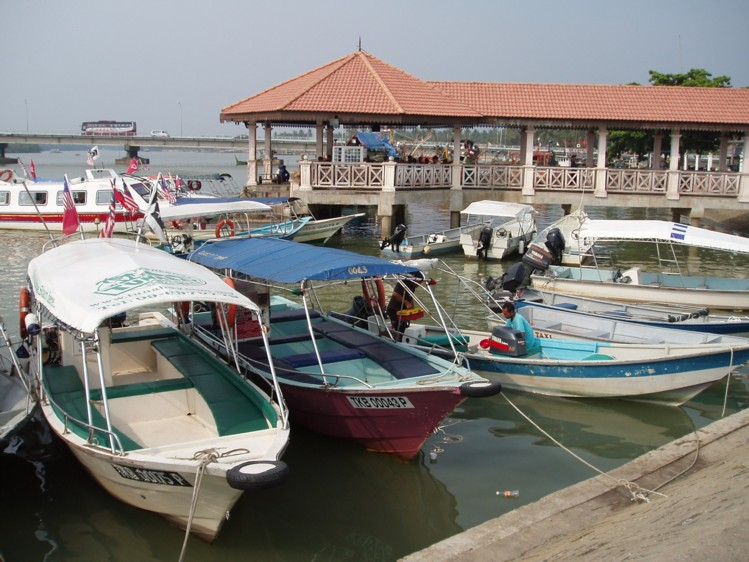
Kuala Besut Harbour and Jetty

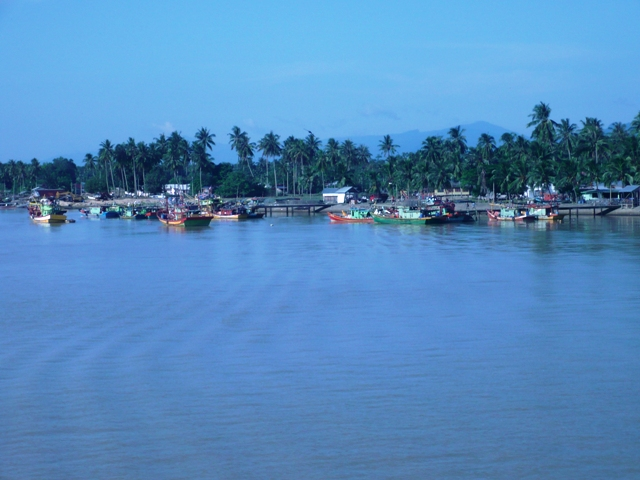
Kuala Besut river seen from the main bridge
