= Perhentian Islands =

Islands in Besut, Terengganu, Malaysia

Native name: Kepulauan Perhentian كڤولاوان ڤرهنتين
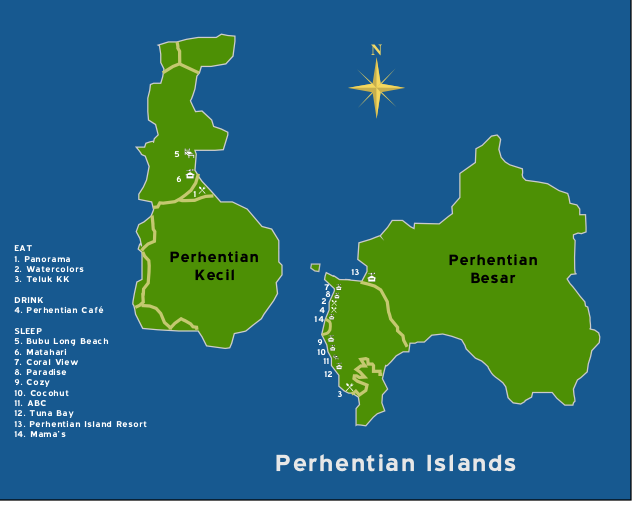
- Interactive map of Perhentian Islands

Geography
- Location: South China Sea
- Coordinates: 5°55′N 102°44′E
- Archipelago: Perhentian Islands
- Total islands: 9
- Major islands: Perhentian Besar and Perhentian Kecil
- Area: 15.96 km^{2} (6.16 sq mi)
- Highest elevation: 344 m (1129 ft)

Administration
- Malaysia
- State: Terengganu
- District: Besut
- Mukim: Perhentian Islands

Demographics
- Population: 1,309 (2020)
- Languages: Malaysian Malay, Kelantan-Pattani Malay, Terengganu Malay

Additional information
- Time zone: MST (UTC+8)
- Postal code: 22300

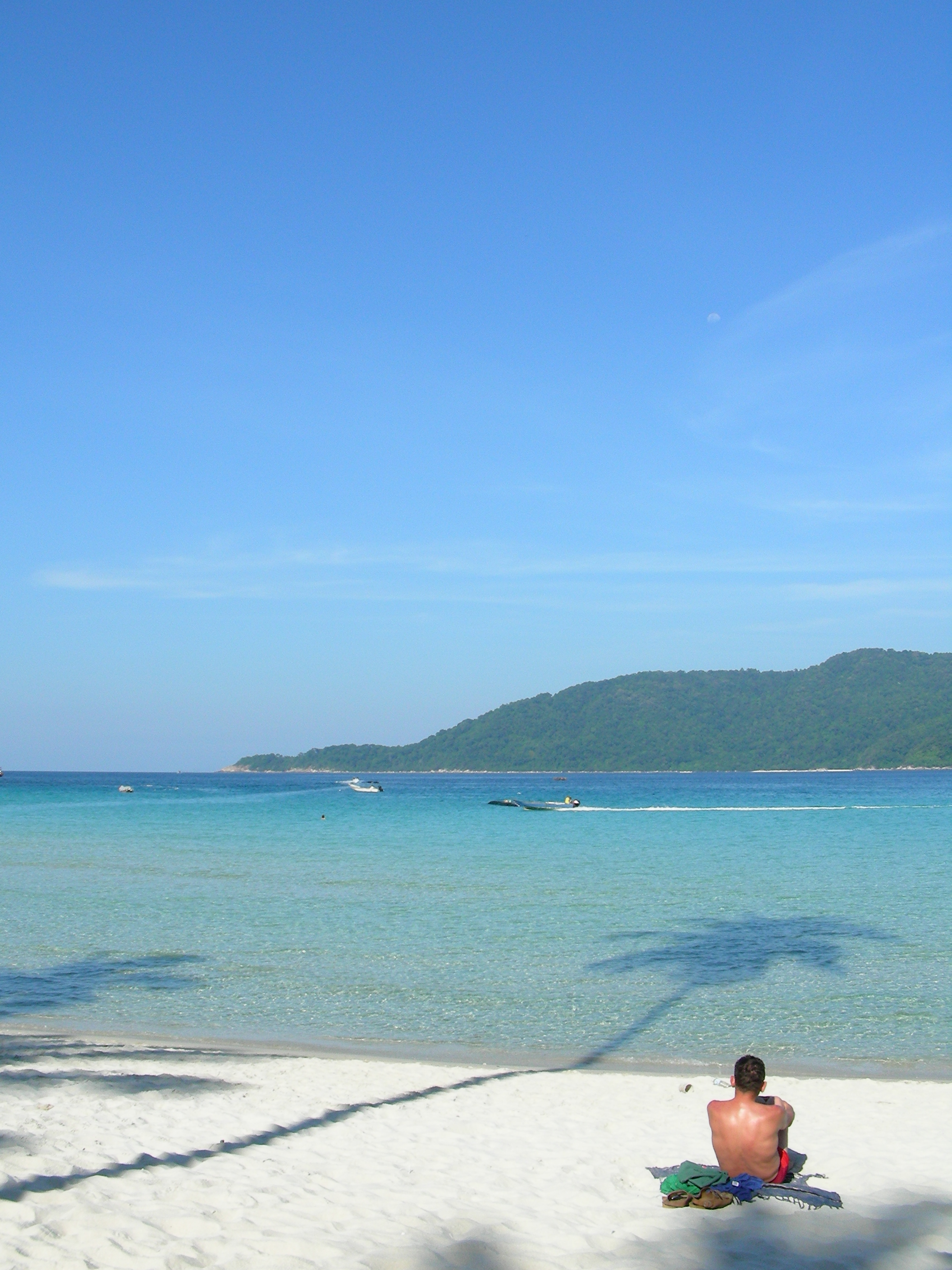
Perhentian Kecil

The Perhentian Islands (Malay: Kepulauan Perhentian; Terengganu Malay: Perhentiang; Kelantan-Pattani Malay: Perhentiey) are a group of islands off the coast of Besut District, Terengganu, Malaysia.

The two main islands are Perhentian Besar ("Greater Perhentian") and Perhentian Kecil ("Lesser Perhentian"). The small, uninhabited islands of Susu Dara (Virgin Milk), Serengeh and Rawa, lie off Kecil. As in the rest of Besut, people generally speak Kelantanese Malay. However, English is also widely spoken.

== History ==
The name "Perhentian" means "stopping point" in Malay, referring to the islands' traditional role as a waypoint for traders between Bangkok and Malaysia. The islands were sparsely inhabited by fishers for centuries, although tourism now accounts for most of the economic activity.

The Perhentian Islands appear on many maps from the nineteenth and twentieth century as 'The Station Islands'. This arises from the British colonial period, as an English translation of "stopping point".

Pulau Perhentian was one of the islands where Vietnamese refugees or boat people landed during the 1970s.

The islands were gazetted as a marine park in 1994, prohibiting all fishing within two miles from the shore.

== Geography ==
=== Two main islands ===
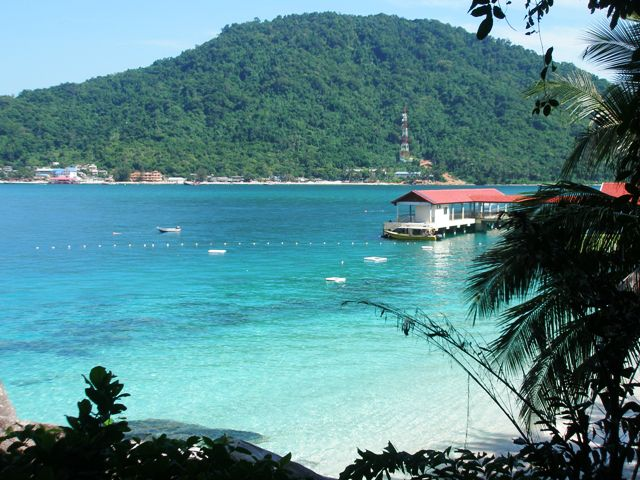
Perhentian Kecil seen from Perhentian Besar

Nature tourism provides the economic base for the islands. Both the islands have white coral sand beaches and a clear sea. Popular tourist activities include scuba-diving, snorkeling, and swimming. The islands are home to numerous different species of monitor lizards, venomous spiders, and geckos. In the water and on the coral reefs, sea turtles, clownfish, cuttlefish, blue spotted rays, and black tipped sharks swim freely among many others.

The Perhentian islands have a tropical climate with temperatures steadily around 30 °C (86 degrees F) and frequent, brief thunderstorms. During peak season, the waters are calm, making conditions favourable for diving. There are dozens of dive sites around both main islands, as well as several off-shore sites.

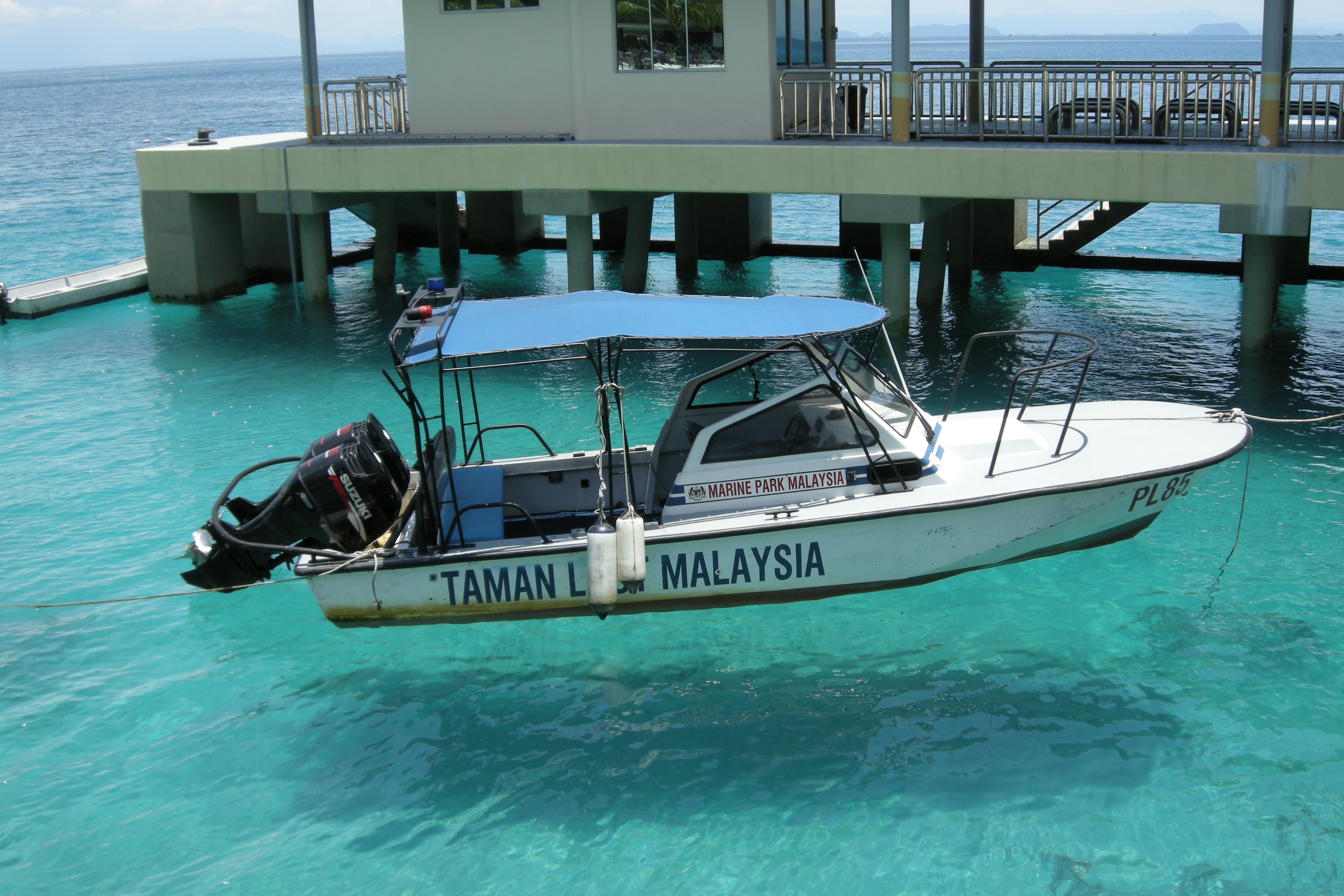
Boats at Perhentian Besar jetty

=== Seven uninhabited islands ===
There are seven more islands in the Perhentian archipelago other than Perhentian Besar and Perhentian Kecil. These islands are uninhabited, but are accessible by boat and sometimes used as snorkeling and scuba diving sites.

=== List of islands by area ===
For land administration purpose, 9 islands including the 2 main islands form the Perhentian Islands Mukim of the Besut District. Of these, 3 islands were protected and gazetted as marine parks by the Department of Fisheries and zoned 2 nautical miles (3.7 km) from the shore at lowest tide.

Island	Area (km^{2})
Perhentian Besar^{[a]}	9.498
Perhentian Kecil^{[a]}	5.805
Susu Dara Besar^{[a]}	0.255
Rhu	0.234
Rawa	0.068
Serenggeh	0.052
Tokong Kemudi	0.020
Susu Dara Kecil	0.020
Teku Burung	0.003
Total	15.955

Note: ^[a]Islands designated as marine parks.

== Transportation ==
The Perhentian Islands do not have any paved roads or air strips. Transportation to, from and between the islands is primarily on speed boats from the jetty at Kuala Besut on the Malaysian mainland. Jungle trails connect the individual beaches on both islands.

== Climate ==
The Perhentian islands experience a heavy monsoon season between November and February, and most of the islands are essentially closed off to tourists. Resorts and ferry services are stopped during this time due to the weather but there is still a boat service daily to serve the fishermen village at Pulau Perhentian Kecil. On average each year, the Perhentian Islands receive over 98.3 plus inches of rain and experience roughly 12 daylight hours.

== Utilities ==
Utilities on the island have not kept pace with the rapid expansion in tourism. In the summer of 2007, two wind turbines were installed, although they were still not connected to the network as of August 2013, leaving diesel generators as the main source of the islands' electrical power. The islands have mobile phone coverage, but as of 2022 still lack a sewerage system, leading some resorts to discharge wastewater directly into the sea.

== Turtle conservation ==
The Perhentian Islands are home to a significant green and hawksbill sea turtle nesting population. The Department of Fisheries runs a turtle hatchery on the islands to help address the declining turtle populations. Egg poaching from the beaches is a continuing problem.

== See also ==
- Geography of Malaysia
