= List of Kuala settlements =

Kuala is used in the name of a number of settlements, districts and geographical features in Malaysia and Indonesia; in the Malay and Indonesian languages it means the mouth of a river, an estuary, or a confluence where two or more rivers meet:

- Kuala, town and administrative district of Langkat Regency in northern Sumatra, Indonesia
- Kuala Balah, state constituency in Kelantan, Malaysia
- Kuala Batee, district in Southwest Aceh Regency, Aceh, Indonesia
- Kuala Bekah, town in the far south of Thailand, near the border with Malaysia
- Kuala Belait, the administrative town of Belait District, Brunei
- Kuala Berang, the seat and largest town of Hulu Terengganu District, Terengganu, Malaysia
- Kuala Besut, mukim in Besut District, Terengganu, Malaysia
- Kuala Cenaku, town in Indragiri Hulu Regency, Riau, Indonesia
- Kuala Dipang, kampong near Kampar in Perak, Malaysia
- Kuala Dungun, the capital of Dungun District, Terengganu, Malaysia
- Kuala Jeneris, small town in Hulu Terengganu District, Terengganu, Malaysia
- Kuala Kangsar, the royal town of Perak, Malaysia
- Kuala Kapuas, the regency seat of Kapuas Regency and a major town in Kalimantan, Indonesia
- Kuala Kedah, mukim and parliamentary constituency in Kota Setar District, Kedah, Malaysia
- Kuala Kencana, district in Mimika Regency, Central Papua, Indonesia
- Kuala Ketil, small town in Baling District, Kedah, Malaysia
- Kuala Klawang, the district capital of Jelebu District, Negeri Sembilan, Malaysia
- Kuala Krai, town in southern-central Kelantan, Malaysia
- Kuala Krau, federal constituency in Temerloh District, Jerantut District and Maran District, Pahang, Malaysia
- Kuala Kubu Bharu, the district capital of Hulu Selangor District, Selangor, Malaysia
- Kuala Kurau, mukim in Kerian District, Perak, Malaysia
- Kuala Kurun, the regency seat of Gunung Mas Regency and a town in Central Kalimantan
- Kuala Langat, federal constituency in Kuala Langat District, Selangor, Malaysia
- Kuala Linggi, state constituency in Malacca, Malaysia
- Kuala Lipis, capital of Lipis District, Pahang, Malaysia
- Kuala Lumpur, capital city and a federal territory of Malaysia
- Kuala Muda, federal constituency in Kedah, Malaysia
- Kuala Namu International Airport (IATA: KNO, ICAO: WIMM)
- Kuala Nerang, the capital of Padang Terap District, Kedah, Malaysia
- Kuala Nerus, district in Terengganu, Malaysia
- Kuala Pahang, town ward and mukim in Pekan District, Pahang, Malaysia
- Kuala Pegang, small town in Baling District, Kedah, Malaysia
- Kuala Pembuang, the capital of Seruyan Regency, Central Kalimantan, Indonesia
- Kuala Penyu, the capital of the Kuala Penyu District in the Interior Division of Sabah, Malaysia
- Kuala Perlis, suburb of Kangar and the second-largest town in and the main port of Perlis in Malaysia
- Kuala Pilah, town in Kuala Pilah District, Negeri Sembilan, Malaysia
- Kuala Rajang, federal constituency in Sarawak, Malaysia
- Kuala Rompin, the district capital of Rompin District, southeastern Pahang, Malaysia
- Kuala Sanglang, small coastal village town at the border of the Malaysian states of Perlis and Kedah
- Kuala Sawah, hamlet located in Rantau State Constituency District of Seremban, Negeri Sembilan, Malaysia
- Kuala Sedili, village in Kota Tinggi District, Johor, Malaysia
- Kuala Selangor, town in northwestern Selangor, Malaysia
- Kuala Sentul, state constituency in Pahang, Malaysia
- Kuala Sepetang, coastal town in Larut, Matang and Selama District in Perak, Malaysia
- Kuala Simpang, small town located in Pahang, Malaysia
- Kuala Sungai Baru, mukim and town in Alor Gajah District, Malacca, Malaysia
- Kuala Sungai Buloh, small town in Kuala Selangor District, Selangor, Malaysia
- Kuala Tahan, Malaysian village located at the confluence of the Tahan and Tembiling Rivers, in Jerantut District, Pahang
- Kuala Tatau, village in Tatau District, Bintulu Division in the Malaysian state of Sarawak
- Kuala Telemung, mukim in Hulu Terengganu District, Terengganu, Malaysia
- Kuala Tembeling, mukim in Jerantut District, Pahang, Malaysia
- Kuala Terengganu, the administrative, economic and royal city of the state of Terengganu, Malaysia

== See also ==
- Kuala Stabas, premium economy class train that serves the Tanjungkarang-Baturaja, Indonesia
- Koala (disambiguation)
