= Terengganu State Route T174 =

Road in Malaysia

Terengganu Route 174
- Jalan Kampung Buloh

Major junctions
- North end: Chenih
- FT 106 Federal Route 106
- South end: Kampung Dusun

Location
- Country: Malaysia
- Primary destinations: Kampung Buloh

Highway system
- Highways in Malaysia; Expressways; Federal; State

Jalan Kampung Buloh (Terengganu state route 174) is a major road in Terengganu, Malaysia. The Memorial Batu Bersurat Terengganu, Sungai Tersat, the site of the Terengganu Inscription Stone which was discovered in 1899, is located in Sungai Tersat.

== Features ==
=== Sungai Berang Bridge ===
The Sungai Berang Bridge or Jambatan Sungai Berang is a major bridge across the Berang River.

=== Memorial Batu Bersurat Terengganu, Sungai Tersat ===
The Memorial Batu Bersurat Terengganu, Sungai Tersat or Terengganu Inscription Stone Memorial is a monument to commemorate the discovery of the Terengganu Inscription Stone in 1899. This memorial was officially opened on 13 April 1992 by the Menteri Besar (Chief Minister) of Terengganu at that time, Tan Sri Wan Mokhtar Ahmad.

== List of junctions ==
Km	Exit	Junctions	To	Remarks
		Kuala Berang	West; FT 106 Kuala Berang Bridge; T134 Jenagur; FT 247 Jerteh; FT 247 Sungai Tong; FT 185 Gua Musang; FT 185 Kenyir Lake East; FT 106 Town Centre; FT 106 Ajil; East Coast Expressway East Coast Expressway; Kuala Terengganu; Kuantan; Kuala Lumpur	T-junctions
		Dewan MDHT		
		Perpustakaan Awam Daerah Hulu Terengganu (District Library)		
		Kuala Berang Roundabout		Roundabout
		Sungai Berang Bridge; Jambatan Sungai Berang		Start/end of bridge
		Sungai Berang Bridge; Jambatan Sungai Berang		
		Sungai Berang Bridge; Jambatan Sungai Berang		Start/end of bridge
		Kampung Buloh		
		Memorial Batu Bersurat Terengganu, Sungai Tersat	Memorial Batu Bersurat Terengganu, Sungai Tersat (Site of the Terengganu Inscription Stone discovered in 1899)	Historical site
		Kampung Kuala Por		
		Sungai Por bridge		
		Kampung Pasir Nering		
		Kampung Dusun		
