= Bukit Payung–Telemung Highway =

Road in Malaysia

Federal Route 250
- Bukit Payung–Telemung Highway
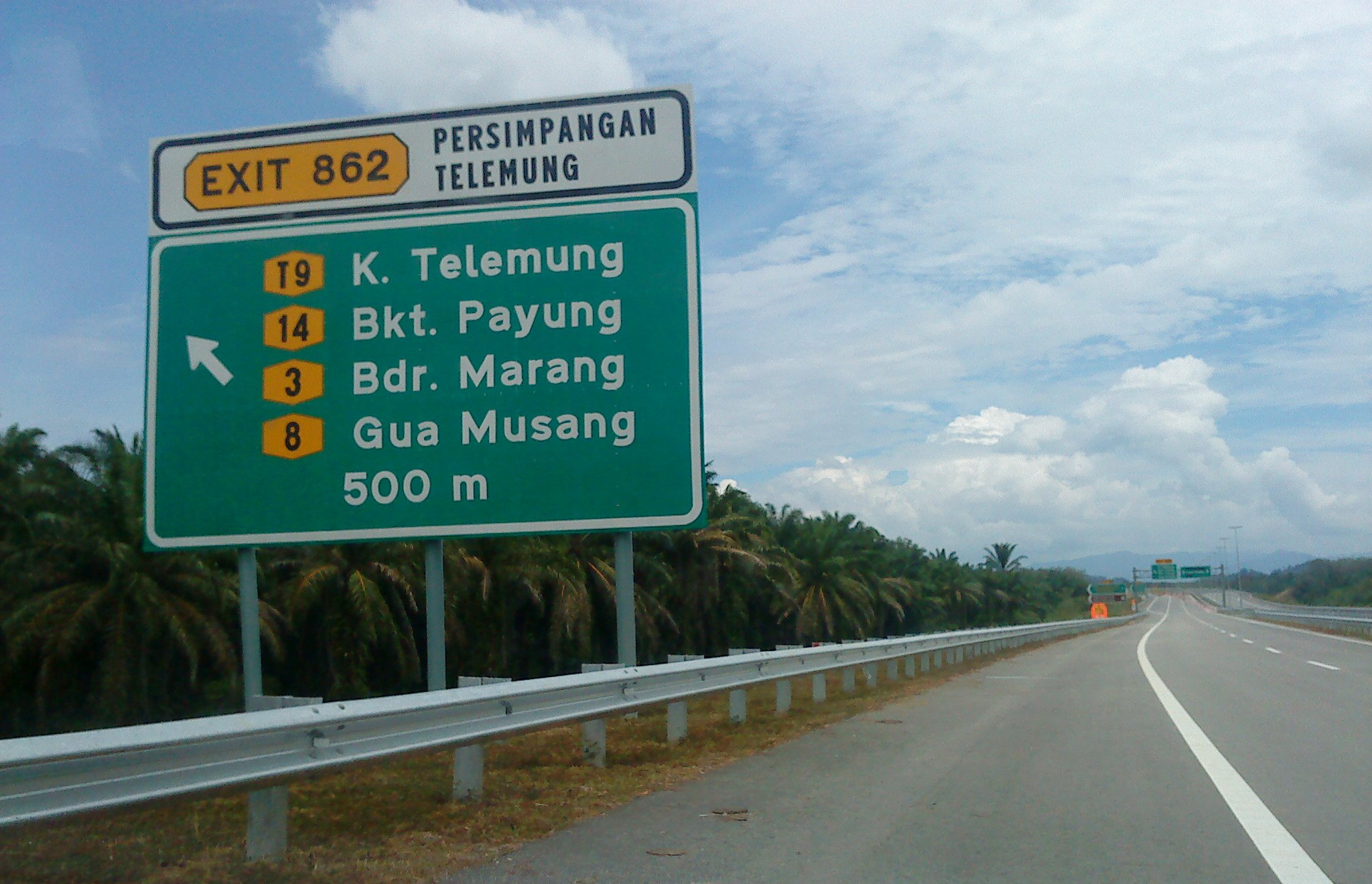

Route information
- Maintained by Malaysian Public Works Department
- Length: 15.5 km (9.6 mi)

Major junctions
- West end: Kuala Jeneris
- FT 36 / FT 185 Second East–West Highway; FT 247 Federal Route 247; East Coast Expressway; FT 14 Federal Route 14
- East end: Bukit Payong

Location
- Country: Malaysia

Highway system
- Highways in Malaysia; Expressways; Federal; State

Bukit Payung–Telemung Highway, Federal Route 250 is a major controlled-access highway in Terengganu, Malaysia. This highway is part of the Package 11 and 12 of the East Coast Expressway Phase 2 project (Jabur - Kuala Terengganu). This highway was opened to all traffic on 18 May 2012.

== Features ==
At most sections, the highway was built under the JKR R5 road standard, allowing maximum speed limit of up to 90 km/h.

The sections between Kuala Jeneris junction and Telemung-ECE intersection are currently under construction.

On 29 August 2024, this highway is gazetted as Federal Route 250.

== Junction lists ==
The entire route is located in Terengganu.

Legend:

- I/C - Interchange, I/S - Intersection, RSA - Rest and service area, OBR - Overhead bridge restaurant, R/R - Restaurant and rest plaza, L/B - Layby, V/P - Vista point, TN - tunnel, T/P - Toll plaza, BR - Bridge
- C - Cloverleaf, S - Stack, T-A - Trumpet-A, T-B - Trumpet-B, DT - Directional-T/Y, SDT - Semi-Directional-T/Y, P-Y - Partial-Y, D - Diamond, P-C - Partial cloverleaf, D-D - Diverging diamond, D-R - Direct ramp

District	Km	Exit	Name	Destinations	Notes
Through to FT 36 / FT 185 Second East–West Highway
Hulu Terengganu			Kuala Jeneris I/C	FT 247 Malaysia Federal Route 247 – Besut, Setiu, Sungai Tong, Kuala Berang, Ajil	Junctions
Hulu Terengganu	15.1		Telemung-ECE I/C	East Coast Expressway – Kota Bharu, Kuala Terengganu, Setiu, Ajil, Kuantan, Kuala Lumpur	T-junctions
Hulu Terengganu	11.1		Kuala Telemung I/C	T9 Jalan Manir–Telemung–Tajin – Kuala Telemung, Manir, Kuala Berang	Diamond interchange
Hulu Terengganu	9.6	BR	Sungai Terengganu bridge		
Hulu Terengganu	8.6		Pasir Tinggi I/C	T101 Jalan Pengadang Baru Pasir Tinggi – Pasir Tinggi, Serada, Alor Limbat	Parclo interchange
Marang	4.3	BR	Sungai Kepong bridge		
Marang	3.7	BR	Sungai Laca bridge		
Marang	0.2	BR	Sungai Buaya bridge		
Marang	0.0		Bukit Payung I/C	FT 14 Jerangau–Jabor Highway – Kuala Terengganu, Bukit Payong, Kuala Berang, Ajil, Bukit Besi, Kuantan; T26 Jalan Bukit Payung–Rhu Rendang – Undang, Marang	Junctions
