= Terengganu State Route T134 =

Road in Malaysia

Terengganu Route 134
- Jalan Jenagur

Major junctions
- East end: Kuala Berang; Kampung Teluk Masjid
- FT 247 Federal Route 247; FT 106 Federal Route 106; T137 Jalan Bukit Kapah
- West end: Kenyir Dam (Sultan Mahmud Power Station)

Location
- Country: Malaysia
- Primary destinations: Jenagur

Highway system
- Highways in Malaysia; Expressways; Federal; State

Jalan Jenagur, Terengganu State Route T134 is a major road in Terengganu, Malaysia. It connects Kuala Berang with Jenagur, Payang Kayu, and Sultan Mahmud Power Station.

== List of junctions ==
Km	Exit	Junctions	To	Remarks
		Kuala Berang; Kampung Teluk Masjid	North; FT 247 Jerteh; FT 247 Sungai Tong; FT 185 Gua Musang; FT 185 Kenyir Lake East; FT 106 Kuala Berang Bridge; FT 106 Town Centre; FT 106 Ajil; East Coast Expressway East Coast Expressway; Kuala Terengganu; Kuantan; Kuala Lumpur	T-junctions
		Kampung Gaung		
		Kampung Teluk Pecung		
		Kampung Pauh		
		Anak Sungai Terengganu bridge		
		Pulau Tengah; Kampung Tanjung Baru		
		Kampung Bidur		
		Sungai Pueh bridge		
		Kuala Pueh	Northwest; T137 Jalan Bukit Kapah; Kuala Ping; Baong; Payang Kayu; Bukit Kapah	T-junctions
		Kampung Kukuran		
		Sungai Jenagur bridge		
		Kampung Dura		
		Jenagur		
		Kenyir Dam (Sultan Mahmud Power Station)	Kenyir Dam (Sultan Mahmud Power Station); Main Hydroelectric Dam; Main Intake	Restricted area
