= Malaysia Federal Route 106 =

Road in Malaysia

Federal Route 106
- Jalan Ajil-Kuala Berang
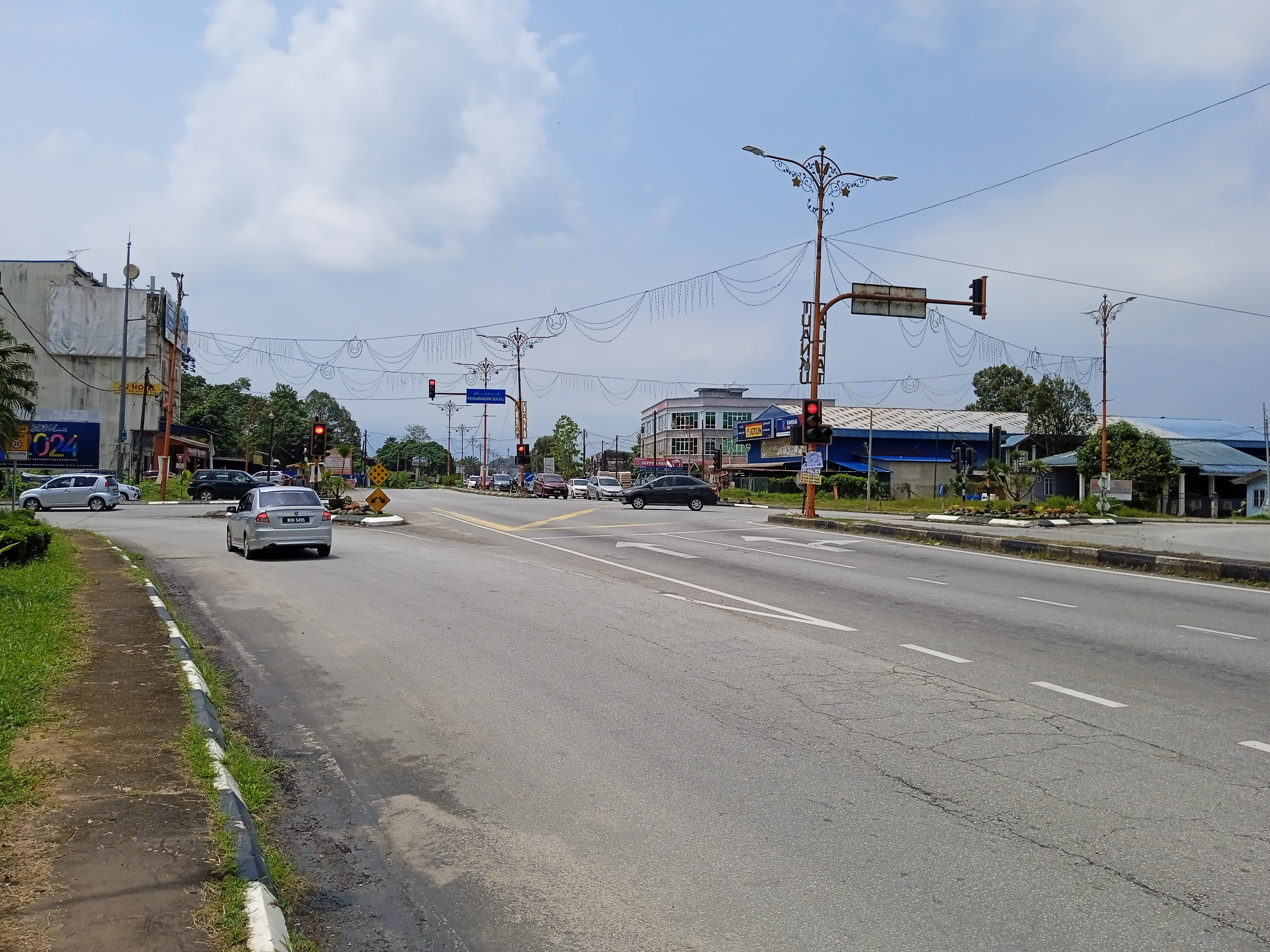

Route information
- Maintained by Malaysian Public Works Department
- Length: 8.87 km (5.51 mi)

Major junctions
- West end: Kuala Berang
- FT 247 Federal Route 247; T134 Jalan Jenagur; T174 Jalan Kampung Buloh; T115 Jalan Sekayu; T113 Jalan Lenjang; East Coast Expressway; FT 14 Jerangau-Jabor Highway
- East end: Ajil

Location
- Country: Malaysia
- Primary destinations: Ipoh, Cameron Highlands, Gua Musang, Kenyir Lake, Sekayu Waterfalls

Highway system
- Highways in Malaysia; Expressways; Federal; State

Federal Route 106, or Jalan Ajil-Kuala Berang, is a dual-carriageway federal highway in Terengganu, Malaysia.

The Kilometre Zero of the Federal Route 106 starts at Ajil.

At most sections, the Federal Route 106 was built under the JKR R5 road standard, allowing maximum speed limit of up to 90 km/h.

== Junction lists ==
The entire route is located in Hulu Terengganu District, Terengganu.

Legend:

- I/C - Interchange, I/S - Intersection, RSA - Rest and service area, OBR - Overhead bridge restaurant, R/R - Restaurant and rest plaza, L/B - Layby, V/P - Vista point, TN - tunnel, T/P - Toll plaza, BR - Bridge
- C - Cloverleaf, S - Stack, T-A - Trumpet-A, T-B - Trumpet-B, DT - Directional-T/Y, SDT - Semi-Directional-T/Y, P-Y - Partial-Y, D - Diamond, P-C - Partial cloverleaf, D-D - Diverging diamond, D-R - Direct ramp

Location	km	mi	Exit	Name	Destinations	Notes
Kuala Berang	8.87	5.51	10607	Kuala Berang; Jenagur I/S	FT 247 Malaysia Federal Route 247 – Jerteh, Sungai Tong, Gua Musang, Kenyir Lake (Jetty), Kota Bharu, Cameron Highlands; T134 Terengganu State Route T134 – Jenagur, Payang Kayu, Sultan Mahmud Power Station (Kenyir Dam)	T-junctions
Kuala Berang				Kampung Gaong		
Kuala Berang				SATU Hulu Terengganu	Loji air Syarikat Air Terengganu (SATU), Hulu Terengganu	
Kuala Berang			Sungai Terengganu Bridge; Kuala Berang Bridge			
Kuala Berang				District Police Headquarters	Hulu Terengganu District Police Headquarters	
Kuala Berang			10606	Kuala Berang; Batu Bersurat I/S	T174 Terengganu State Route T174 – Kampung Buloh, Memorial Batu Bersurat Terengganu, Sungai Tersat (Site of the Terengganu Inscription Stone was discovered on 1899)	T-junctions
Kuala Berang				Kuala Berang Syariah Court	Kuala Berang Syariah Court	
Kuala Berang				MDHT HQ	Hulu Terengganu District Council (MDHT) headquarters	
Kuala Berang			10605	Kuala Berang; Bandar Kuala Berang I/S	T107 Jalan Serada – Kuala Kejir	T-junctions
Kuala Berang				Kuala Berang; Sultan Mahmud Mosque	Sultan Mahmud Mosque, Kuala Berang	
Kuala Berang				Kuala Berang and Land Office	Hulu Terengganu District and Land Office	
Ajil			10604	Kampung Bukit Tok Bat; Sekayu I/S	T115 Jalan Sekayu – Pasir Niyor, Sekayu, Sekayu Waterfalls	T-junctions
Ajil			10603	Kampung Batu 24; Jalan Lenjang I/S	T113 Jalan Lenjang – Lenjang, Pengkalan Ajal	T-junctions
Ajil				JKR Hulu Terengganu HQ	Malaysian Public Works Department (JKR) Hulu Terengganu Headquarters	
Ajil				Hulu Terengganu Hospital	Hulu Terengganu Hospital	T-junctions
Ajil				Taman Kirana		
Ajil				Kampung Batu 23		
Ajil				Kampung Bukit Ara		
Ajil			10602	Ajil; Ajil-ECE I/S	Malaysian Highway Authority East Coast 11 Regional Office; East Coast Expressway – Kota Bharu, Kuala Terengganu, Telemung, Bukit Besi, Kuantan, Kuala Lumpur	T-junctions
Ajil	0.0	0.0	10601	Ajil; Ajil I/S	FT 14 Malaysia Federal Route 14 – Kuala Terenggganu, Bukit Payong, Wakaf Tapai, Jerangau, Bukit Besi, Bandar Al-Muktafi Billah Shah, Kuantan	T-junctions
1.000 mi = 1.609 km; 1.000 km = 0.621 mi
