= Malaysia Federal Route 247 =

Road in Malaysia

Federal Route 247
- Jalan Sungai Tong-Kuala Berang

Route information
- Length: 38.9 km (24.2 mi)

Major junctions
- North end: Sungai Tong
- FT 3 / AH18 Federal Route 3 FT 185 Second East-West Highway; Bukit Payung-Telemung Highway; T137 Jalan Bukit Kapah; T139 State Route T139; T9 Jalan Akob; T134 Jalan Jenagur; FT 106 Federal Route 106
- South end: Kuala Berang

Location
- Country: Malaysia

Highway system
- Highways in Malaysia; Expressways; Federal; State

Federal Route 247, or Jalan Sungai Tong-Kuala Berang (formerly Terengganu State Route T11), is a federal road in Terengganu, Malaysia. It is a main route to Second East-West Highway (Federal Route 185). The Kilometre Zero is at Sungai Tong in Setiu constituency.

== Features ==
At most sections, the Federal Route 247 was built under the JKR R5 road standard, allowing maximum speed limit of up to 90 km/h.

== Junction and town lists ==
The entire route is located in Terengganu.

Legend:

- I/C - Interchange, I/S - Intersection, RSA - Rest and service area, OBR - Overhead bridge restaurant, R/R - Restaurant and rest plaza, L/B - Layby, V/P - Vista point, TN - tunnel, T/P - Toll plaza, BR - Bridge

District	Km	Exit	Name	Destinations	Notes
Setiu	0.0		Sungai Tong	FT 3 / AH18 Malaysia Federal Route 3 – Kota Bharu, Jerteh, Bandar Permaisuri, Kuala Terengganu, Sultan Mahmud Airport, Pulau Redang (Jetty), Pulau Perhentian (Jetty); East Coast Expressway – Kota Bharu, Kuantan, Kuala Lumpur	T-junctions
Setiu			Kampung Bukit Nenas		
Setiu		BR	Sungai Tekah bridge		
Setiu			Kampung Bukit		
Setiu			Kampung Tayor		
Hulu Terengganu		BR	Sungai Teris bridge		
Hulu Terengganu			Teris		
Hulu Terengganu			Kampung Bukit Kubur		
Hulu Terengganu			Kampung Kuala Jeneris		
Hulu Terengganu		BR	Sungai Jeneris bridge		
Hulu Terengganu			Kuala Jeneris	FT 185 Second East–West Highway – Aring, Gua Musang, Kuala Krai, Cameron Highlands, Ipoh, Kenyir Lake (Jetty); Bukit Payung–Telemung Highway – Kuala Terengganu, Bukit Payong, Telemong; East Coast Expressway – Kota Bharu, Kuantan, Kuala Lumpur	Junctions
Hulu Terengganu		BR	Sungai Gapur bridge		
Hulu Terengganu			Kampung Gapur		
Hulu Terengganu			Kampung Chapu		
Hulu Terengganu			Kampung Pasir Simpul		
Hulu Terengganu			Kampung Tok Lawit		
Hulu Terengganu		BR	Sungai Ping bridge		
Hulu Terengganu			Kampung Kuala Ping	T137 Jalan Bukit Kapah – Baong, Payang Kayu, Bukit Kapah, Jenagur	T-junctions
Hulu Terengganu			Kampung Tengkawang		
Hulu Terengganu			Kampung Kepah		
Hulu Terengganu			Matang	T139 Terengganu State Route T139 – Kuala Telemung, Kuala Terengganu	T-junctions
Hulu Terengganu			Kampung Paya Akob		
Hulu Terengganu			Sekolah Menengah Sains Hulu Terengganu (SMSHT)	Sekolah Menengah Sains Hulu Terengganu (SMSHT)	
Hulu Terengganu			Kampung Tajin	T9 Jalan Akob – Kuala Telemung, Kuala Terengganu	T-junctions
Hulu Terengganu			Kampung Telaga		
Hulu Terengganu			Kampung Teluk Masjid		
Hulu Terengganu			Kuala Berang	FT 106 Malaysia Federal Route 106 – Town Centre, Ajil; East Coast Expressway – Kota Bharu, Kuala Terengganu, Kuantan, Kuala Lumpur; T134 Jalan Jenagur – Jenagur, Payang Kayu, Sultan Mahmud Power Station (Kenyir Dam)	T-junctions
