= Terengganu State Route T139 =

Malaysian state road

Terengganu Route 139
- Jalan Matang–Nibong–Telemong

Route information
- Maintained by Malaysian Public Works Department
- Restrictions: 90 km/h

Major junctions
- Southwest end: Kampung Matang
- FT 247 Federal Route 247; T170 State Route T170; T9 State Route T9
- Northeast end: Kampung Kuala Telemung

Location
- Country: Malaysia
- Primary destinations: Kuala Berang, Sungai Tong, Kenyir Lake, Kuala Telemung, Manir, Kuala Terengganu, Tajin

Highway system
- Highways in Malaysia; Expressways; Federal; State

Jalan Matang–Nibong–Telemong, Terengganu State Route T139, is a state road in Terengganu, Malaysia.

== Junction lists ==
The entire route is in Hulu Terengganu District, Terengganu.

Legend:

- I/C - Interchange, I/S - Intersection, RSA - Rest and service area, OBR - Overhead bridge restaurant, R/R - Restaurant and rest plaza, L/B - Layby, V/P - Vista point, TN - tunnel, T/P - Toll plaza, BR - Bridge
- C - Cloverleaf, S - Stack, T-A - Trumpet-A, T-B - Trumpet-B, DT - Directional-T/Y, SDT - Semi-Directional-T/Y, P-Y - Partial-Y, D - Diamond, P-C - Partial cloverleaf, D-D - Diverging diamond, D-R - Direct ramp

Location	km	mi	Name	Destinations	Notes
Matang			Kampung Matang	FT 247 Malaysia Federal Route 247 – Kuala Berang, Sungai Tong, Sekayu Waterfall, Kenyir Lake	T-junctions
Nibong			Kampung Baharu	Jalan Kampung Baharu – Kampung Baharu	T-junctions
Nibong			Kampung Nibong		
Paloh Nyior			Jalan Padang Malim I/S	Jalan Padang Malim	T-junctions
Paloh Nyior			Kampung Paloh Nyior		
Bukit Tadok			Kampung Bukit Tadok		
Bukit Tadok			Sungai Telemung Bridge; Lubuk Buntal Bridge		
Telemong			Kampung Lubuk Buntal		
Telemong			Kampung Pelam	T170 Terengganu State Route T170 – Bukit Aman, Sungai Las	T-junctions
Telemong			Kampung Kuala Telemong	T9 Terengganu State Route T9 – Kuala Telemung, Manir, Kuala Terengganu, Tajin, Kuala Berang; Jalan Padang Kachong; East Coast Expressway – Kuala Lumpur, Kuantan	Junctions
1.000 mi = 1.609 km; 1.000 km = 0.621 mi
