= Ajil (town) =

Town in Hulu Terengganu, Terengganu, Malaysia

- Town and district capital
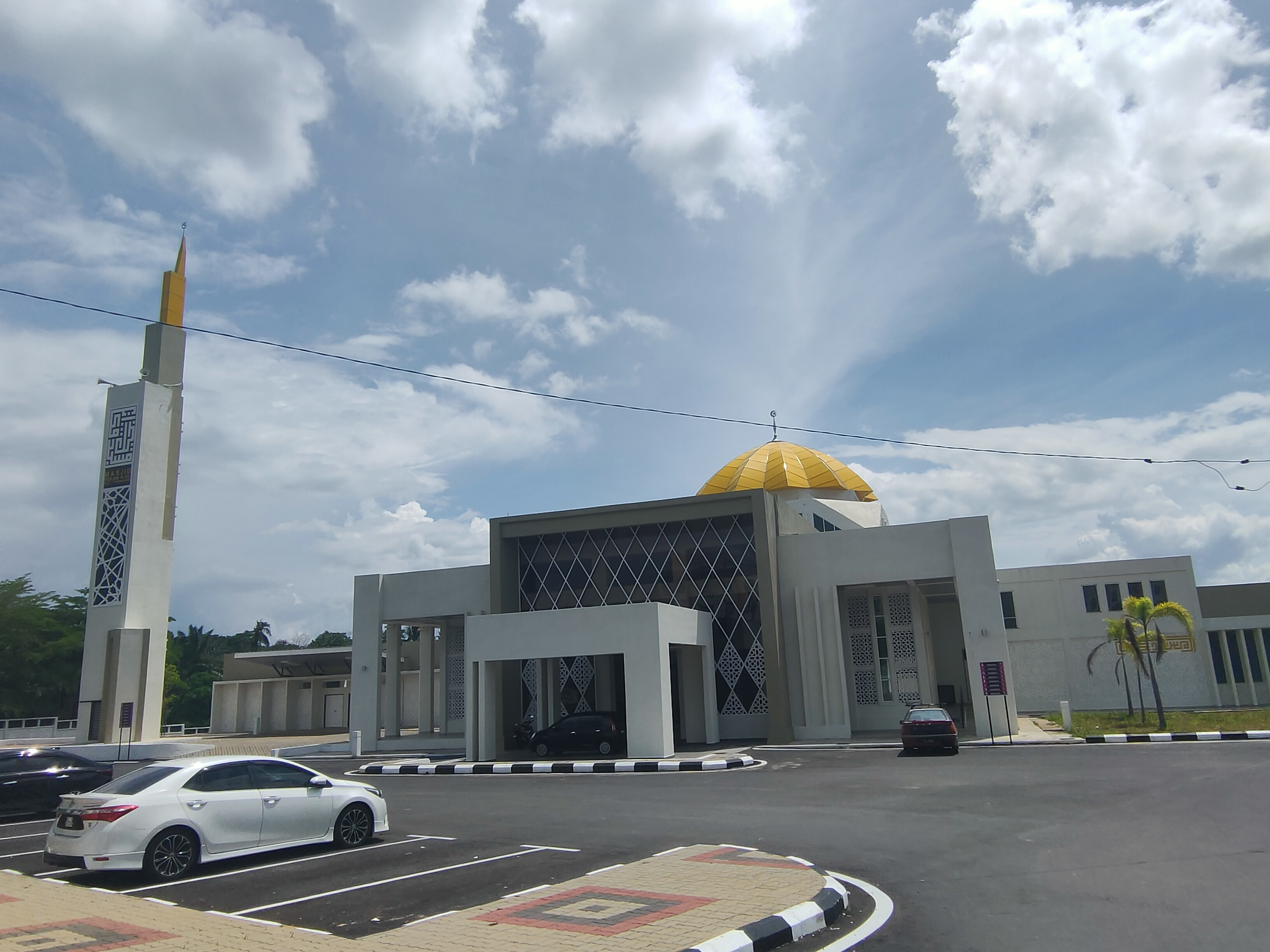
- Masjid Pekan Ajil (Ajil Town Mosque), the main mosque of this town

- Location within Terengganu Location within Malaysia
- Coordinates: 5°05′0″N 103°5′0″E
- Country: Malaysia
- State: Terengganu
- District: Hulu Terengganu

Government
  - Type: District council
  - Body: Hulu Terengganu District Council

Ajil (Jawi: اجيل, est. pop. (2000 census): 1,842) is a small town in the Penghulu Diman commune in Hulu Terengganu District of Terengganu, Malaysia.

== Location ==
The town is located 35 km south of Kuala Terengganu, the state capital, near the intersection of Federal Route 14 (Terengganu's main interior highway) and Federal Route 106 (the main highway to Kuala Berang). Ajil is also home to a migrant detention centre where illegal immigrants are detained.
