= Kuala Berang Bridge =

Bridge in Hulu Terengganu, Terengganu, Malaysia

Sungai Terengganu Bridge Jambatan Kuala Berang جمبتن کوالا بيرڠ
- Carries: Motor vehicles
- Crosses: Terengganu River
- Locale: Federal Route 106 Jalan Ajil-Kuala Berang
- Official name: Kuala Berang Bridge
- Maintained by: Malaysian Public Works Department (JKR) Hulu Terengganu

Characteristics
- Design: box girder
- Width: --
- Longest span: --

History
- Designer: Government of Malaysia; Malaysian Public Works Department (JKR)
- Constructed by: Malaysian Public Works Department (JKR)
- Opened: --

Kuala Berang Bridge or Jambatan Kuala Berang (Jawi: جمبتن کوالا بيرڠ) is a bridge in Kuala Berang, Terengganu, Malaysia, which crosses Terengganu River.

== See also ==
- Federal Route 106
