= Kuala Simpang =

Kuala Simpang is a small town located in Pahang, Malaysia. The percentage of the racial population is 78% are Chinese, 12% are Malay, 7% are Indian and 3% are other races. The population of the town is around 1,439. The mayor of the town is Gan Yee Chee. Recently, a Giant Hypermarket and shopping centre was opened by Gan Yee Chee.

In 2021, Rohingya refugees fleeing persecution from Myanmar found shelter on Ulim Beach in the city.
