= Kuala Cenaku =

Coordinates: 0.4580°S 102.6540°E

Kuala Cenaku is a town in Indragiri Hulu Regency, Riau, Indonesia. It has a population of about 7,000. Located on the Indragiri River in the Sumatran rain forest, Fred Pearce described it as "a struggling bankside community." There is a mill nearby run by Asia Pulp and Paper. Logging is an important economic activity.
