= Bukit Puteri =

Hill in Kuala Terengganu, Malaysia

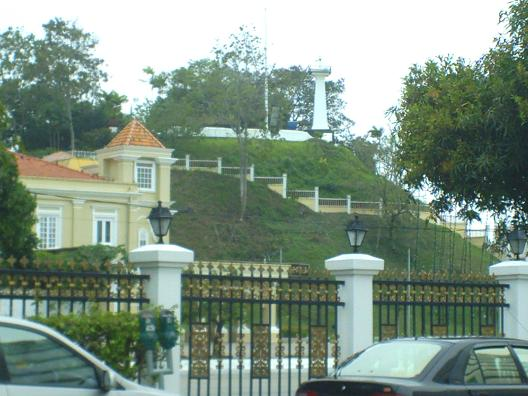
- Aerial view of Bukit Puteri.

Highest point
- Coordinates: 5°20′10.028″N 103°8′14.705″E

Naming
- English translation: "Princess hill"
- Language of name: Malay

Geography
- Location within Terengganu
- Location: Kuala Terengganu, Terengganu, Malaysia

Geology
- Mountain type: Hill

Bukit Puteri (Jawi: بوکيت ڤوتري, English: Princess Hill) is a small hill of historical significance in Kuala Terengganu, Terengganu, Malaysia. It is located right in the middle of the city near the estuary of Terengganu River.

== Background of the hill ==
Bukit Puteri is located near to Istana Maziah, one of Terengganu's palaces, the general post office, and Pasar Payang, the main market of Kuala Terengganu. At the foothill is Bazaar Warisan, a place that sells various traditional crafts and products. With a size of 0.688 hectares and a height of 20 metres above the sea level, It is located in a strategic location, overlooking the estuary of Terengganu river.

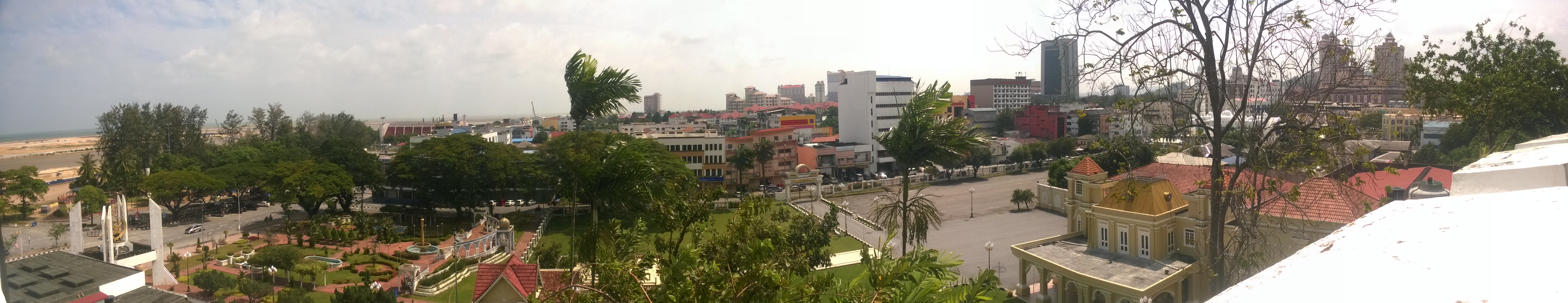
The view of Kuala Terengganu from the top of Bukit Puteri

== History ==
A myth regarding Bukit Puteri tells about a legendary princess who lived on top of the hill. The local residents always went to her to borrow utensils such as bowls, plates, or cutleries for their festive events or celebrations. However, since there were a number of people who did not return the borrowed utensils to her, the princess sulked and decided to leave the hill in search for other places where she could help people.

The hill has been in existence in the history of Terengganu since the 16th century. It was important as a lookout point in facing enemies, especially those who come from the sea. During the reign of Sultan Mansur II (1831-1836), Sultan Muhamad I (1836-1839), and Sultan Umar (1839-1876), Bukit Puteri was used as a stronghold during the civil war that occurred during those times.

== Features ==
A number of historical artefacts and monuments are located on the top of Bukit Puteri. One of the artefacts is a brass bell or genta weighing 175 kg. This bell was made in 1908 by a craftsmen known as Wan Ali Wan Awang. The bell would be struck during calamity or to mark special occasions such as iftar during the holy month of Ramadan. A number of cannons used to found on the hill, but now only a few remains, with the most famous being the Meriam Beranak, a set of two different-sized cannons.

A flag pole approximately 18 metres tall built during the reign of Sultan Sulaiman Badrul Alam Shah and a lighthouse as a beacon to sailors on the sea were erected on the hill. A fort containing a throne was also built by Sultan Umar, with the building materials consisting of a mixture of honey, egg white, bricks, and chalk as a plaster. Other than that, a cemetery containing graves of various religious figures of Terengganu can also be found.

== Gallery ==
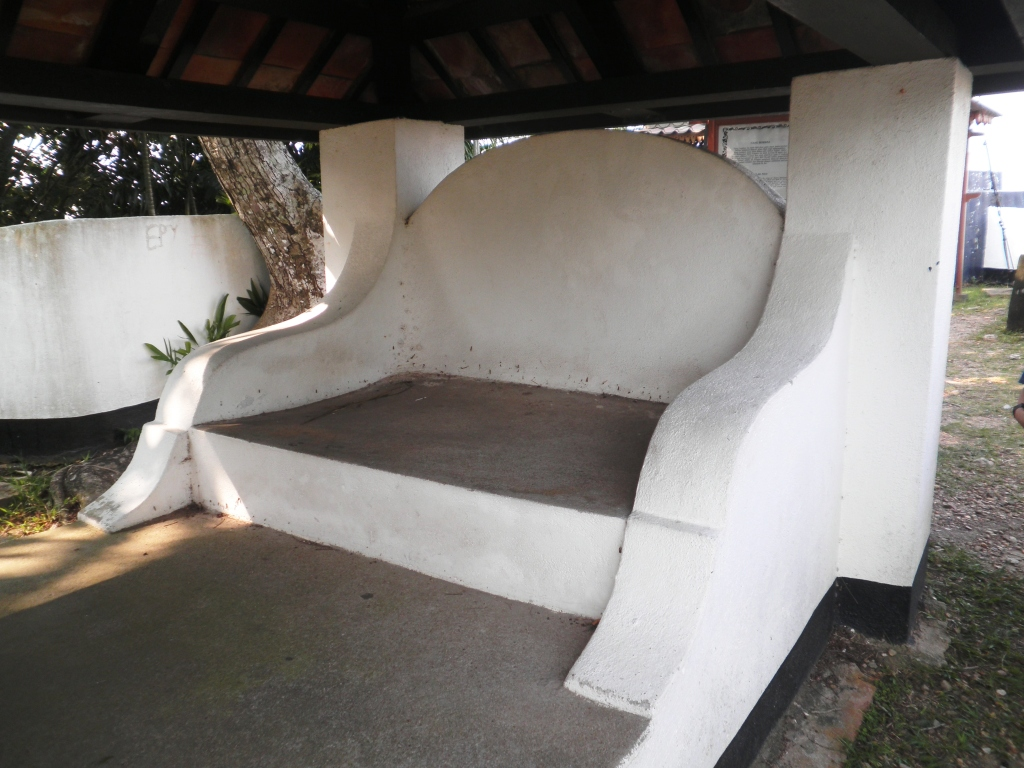
The throne on top of the hill.

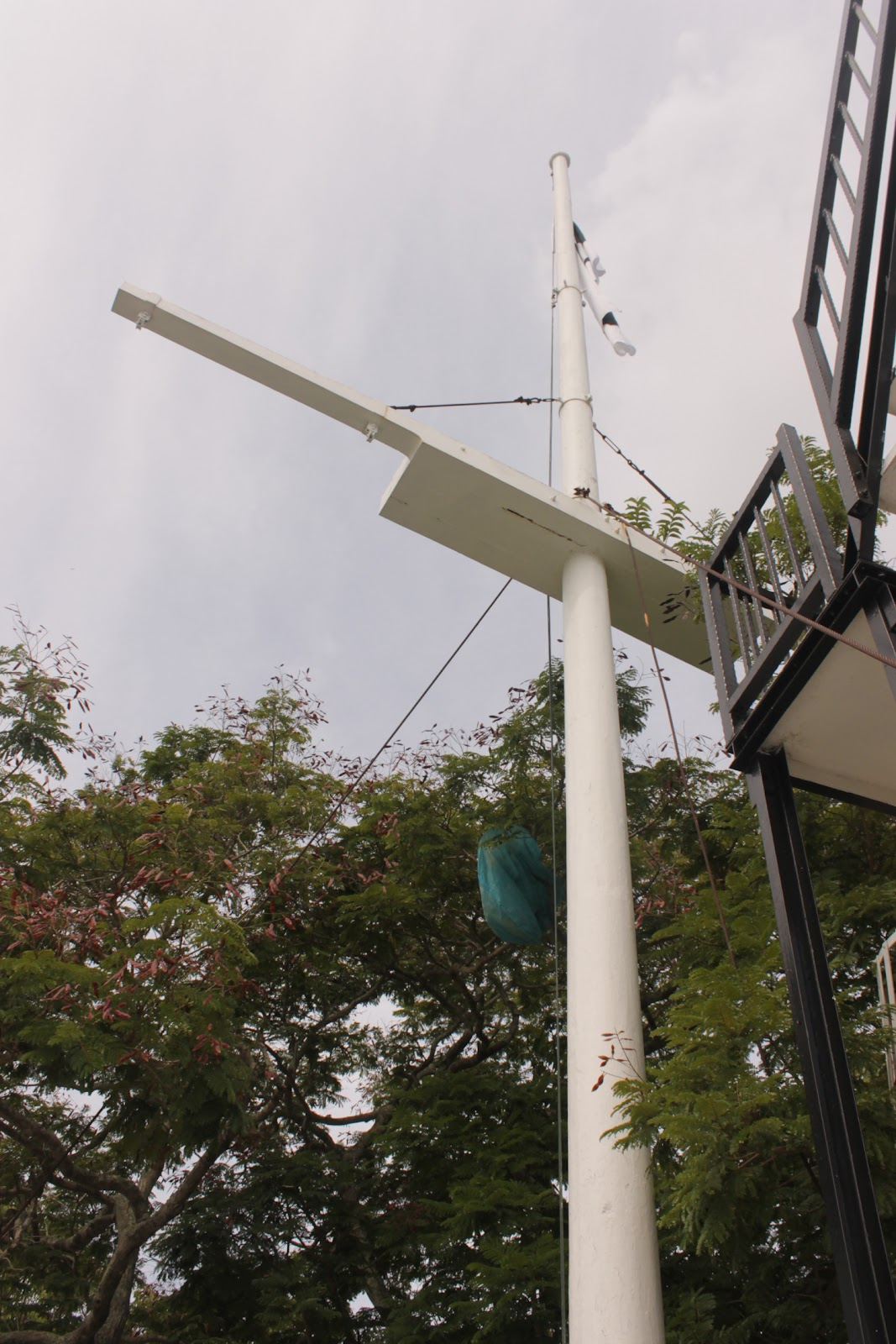
The flagpole.

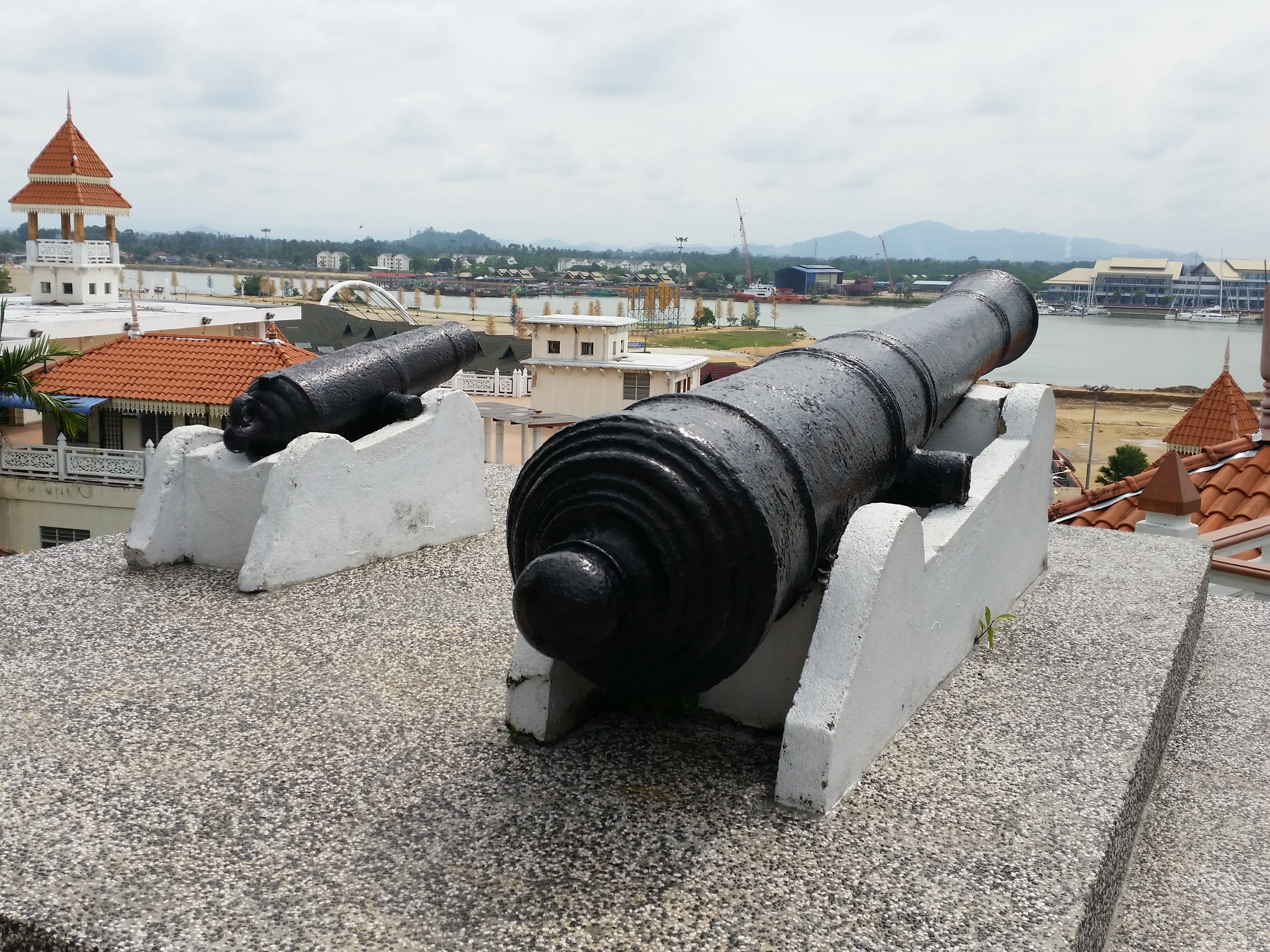
Meriam Beranak, a set of twin cannons.

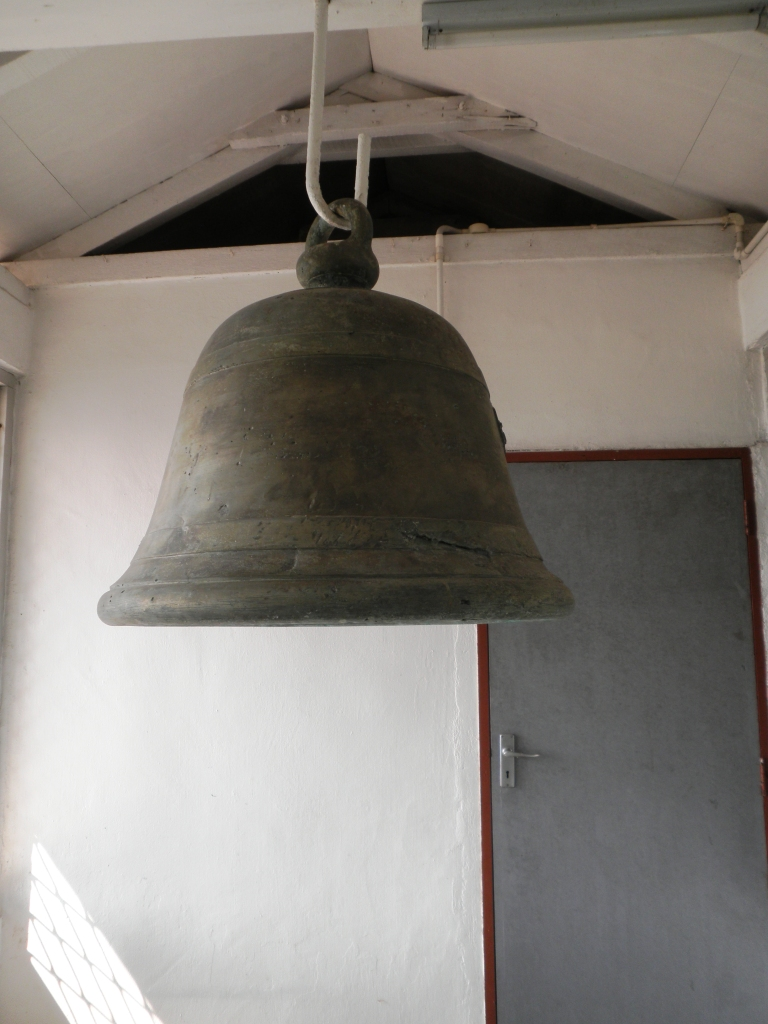
Genta, a bell made from brass

== See also ==
- Geography of Malaysia
