= Kuala Sawah =

Coordinates: 2°38′N 101°57′E

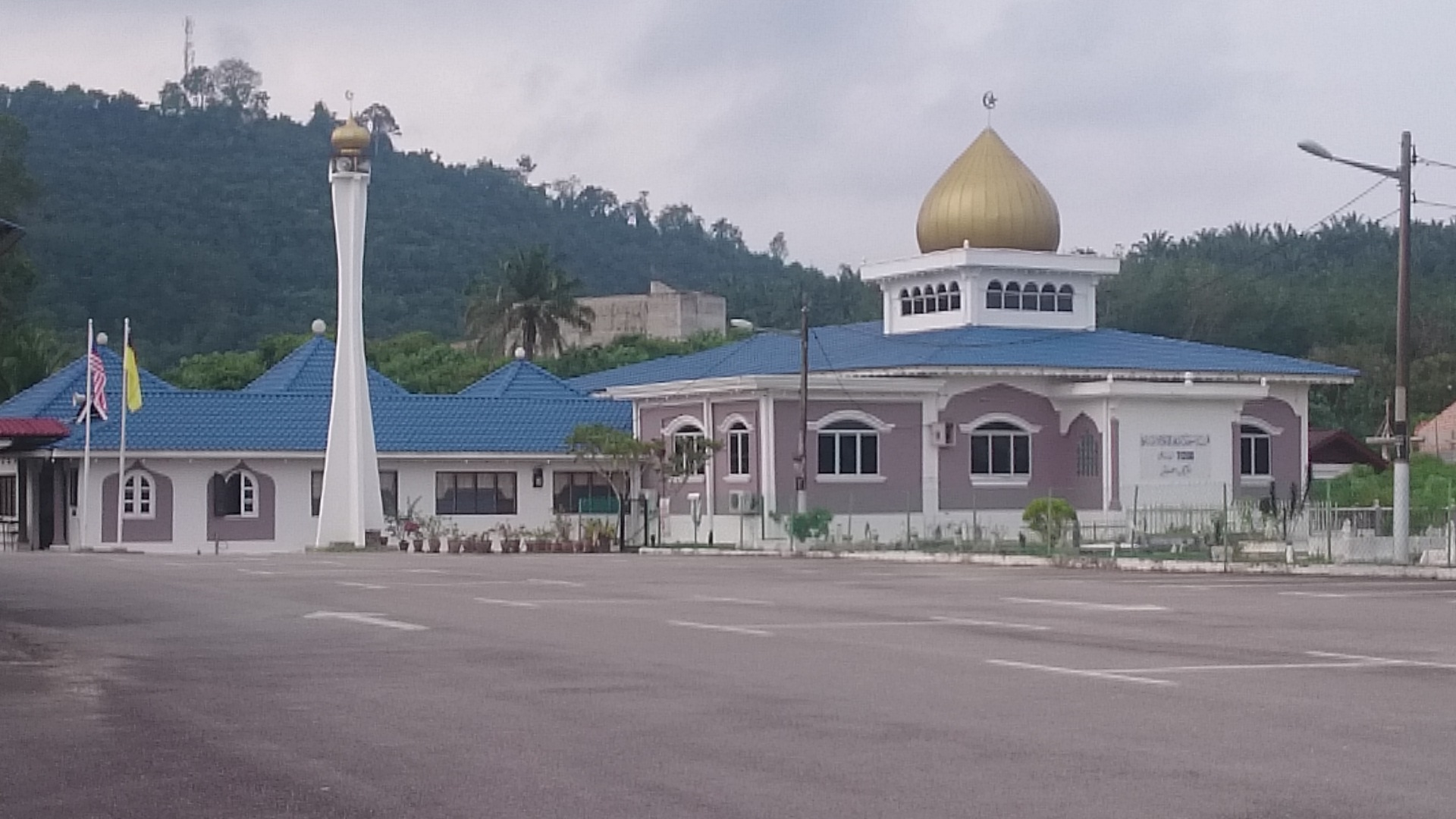
Kuala Sawah Mosque

Kuala Sawah is a hamlet located in Rantau State Constituency (DUN Rantau) District of Seremban, Negeri Sembilan, state of Malaysia. It is about 10 km away from Seremban. There are about 5000 residents in this area. The population consists of Chinese, Malay and Indian.

The Kuala Sawah mosque was built in early 1900 on a piece of land at the junction of Jalan Ulu Sawah & Jalan Kuala Sawah-Rantau, donated by the late Bujai Bin Dato Raja Mat Shah, a reputable estate owner with large rubber holdings.
