= Kuala Stabas =

Passenger train service in Indonesia

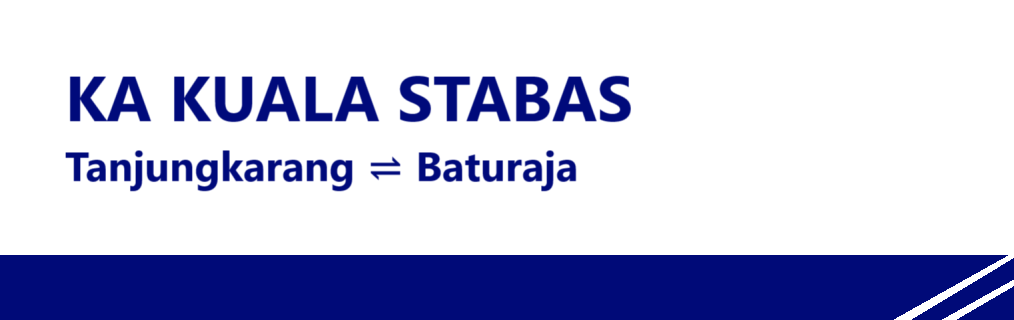

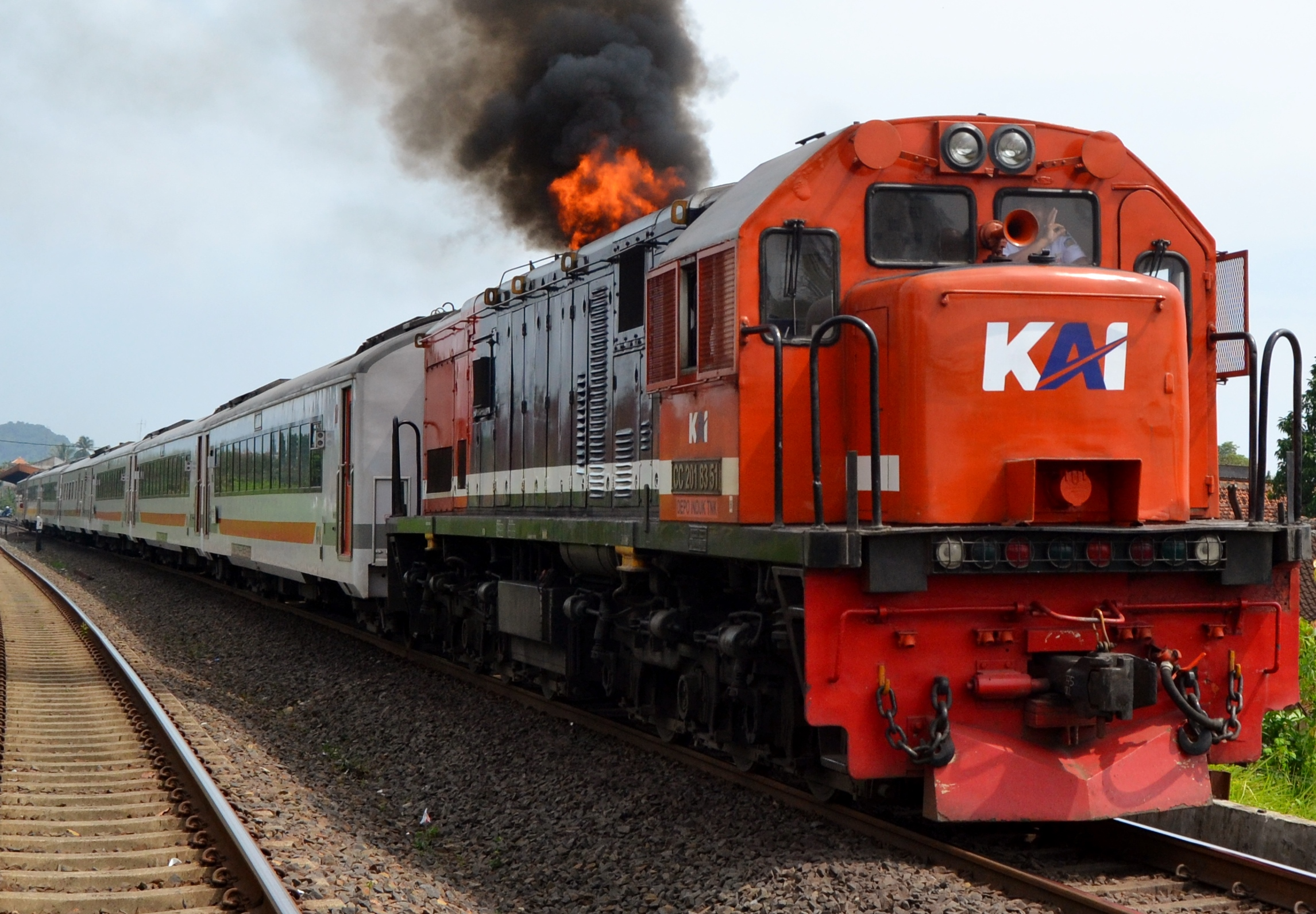
- Kuala Stabas train in Labuhanratu Station, Bandar Lampung

Overview
- Service type: Inter-city rail
- Status: Operating
- Locale: South Sumatra and Lampung, Indonesia
- First service: 11 June 2018; 7 years ago
- Current operator: KAI Regional Division IV Tanjungkarang

Route
- Termini: Tanjungkarang; Baturaja
- Stops: 15
- Distance travelled: 216 km (134 mi)
- Service frequency: Twice a day
- Train number: S3-S6

On-board services
- Class: Premium economy class
- Seating arrangements: 2-2
- Catering facilities: On-board café
- Baggage facilities: Overhead racks
- Other facilities: Light fire extinguisher, emergency brake, air conditioner and toilet

Technical
- Track gauge: 1,067 mm (3 ft 6 in)
- Operating speed: 70–90 km/h

Kuala Stabas is a premium economy class train that serves the Tanjungkarang-Baturaja route. It is operated by KAI Regional Division IV Tanjungkarang.

The train is named for a fishing village located in Krui, Pesisir Barat, Lampung, Indonesia.

== History ==
At its inauguration, this train supported the 2018 Eid with daily service.

In December 2019 this train moved to twice a day with the removal of the Seminung and Way Umpu trains that covered the Tanjungkarang-Kotabumi route.

== Service ==
The train consists of five premium economy class carriages, one dining carriage, and a generator.

Although this train offers a premium economy class, it receives a subsidy from the national government since 1 January 2020 thanks to a submission from the local government.

== Stations ==
Note: Based on the latest train travel charts and may change at any time.

Station name	Distance from (km)		Location	
Station name	Previous station	Tanjungkarang	Regency/Cities	Province
Tanjungkarang^{1}	—		Bandar Lampung	Lampung
Labuhanratu	4.783		Bandar Lampung	Lampung
Rejosari	11.541	16.324	South Lampung	Lampung
Tegineneng	10.540	26.864	South Lampung	Lampung
Bekri	14.986	41.850	Central Lampung	Lampung
Haji Pemanggilan	8.820	50.670	Central Lampung	Lampung
Sulusuban	6.850	57.520	Central Lampung	Lampung
Kotabumi	27.919	85.439	North Lampung	Lampung
Ketapang	17.614	103.053	North Lampung	Lampung
Tulungbuyut	20.486	123.539	North Lampung	Lampung
Negeri Agung	11.983	135.522	Way Kanan	Lampung
Blambangan Umpu	15.280	150.802	Way Kanan	Lampung
Way Tuba	10.658	171.377	Way Kanan	Lampung
Martapura	12.034	183.411	East OKU	South Sumatra
Baturaja^{1}	32.354	215.765	Ogan Komering Ulu	South Sumatra

Notes:

^1 Termini.

== Incident ==
On 18 July 2023, Kuala Stabas train crashed into a truck loaded with sugar cane at a level crossing without a gate in Blambangan Pagar, North Lampung. The locomotive was damaged and its journey disrupted.
