= Jenagur =

Coordinates: 5°05′22.5″N 102°55′05.4″E

Jenagur in Hulu Terengganu District

Jenagur (Jawi: جناڬور) is a mukim in Hulu Terengganu District, Terengganu, Malaysia.
