= Kuala Jeneris =

Town in Terengganu, Malaysia

Coordinates: 5°12′03.3″N 102°53′02.7″E

Kuala Jeneris (Jawi: كوالا جنيريس) is a small town in Hulu Terengganu District, Terengganu, Malaysia. It is the eastern end of the Ipoh-Kuala Terengganu road Federal Route 185.
