= Kuala Telemung =

Kuala Telemung in Hulu Terengganu District

Kuala Telemung (Jawi: كوالا تيليموڠ) is a mukim in Hulu Terengganu District, Terengganu, Malaysia.

Preceded by Hulu Terengganu	District Capital of Hulu Terengganu (1937 - 1972)	Succeeded by Penghulu Diman
