= Terengganu Inscription Stone =

Classical Malay inscription

- Batu Bersurat Terengganu
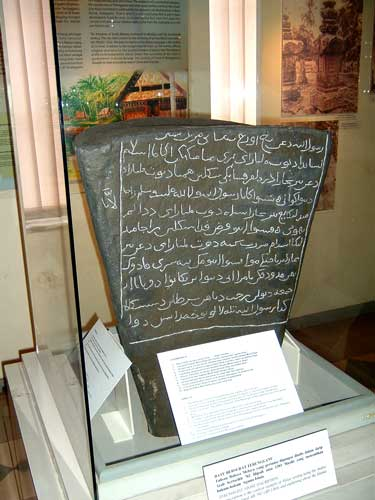
- A replica of the Terengganu Inscription Stone at the National Historical Museum in Kuala Lumpur
- Material: Granite
- Height: < 89 cm (35 in)
- Width: < 53 cm (21 in)
- Writing: Jawi script
- Created: 1303 or 1387 CE
- Discovered: 1887; Kampung Buluh, Kuala Berang, Hulu Terengganu
- Present location: Terengganu State Museum
- Language: Malay

Terengganu Inscription Stone (Malay: Batu Bersurat Terengganu; Jawi: باتو برسورت ترڠݢانو) is a granite stele carrying Classical Malay inscription in Jawi script that was found in Terengganu, Malaysia. The inscription, dated possibly to 702 AH (corresponds to 1303 CE) or 789 AH (1387 CE) constituted the earliest evidence of Jawi writing in the Malay world of Southeast Asia, and was one of the oldest testimonies to the advent of Islam as a state religion in the region. It contains the proclamation issued by a ruler of Terengganu known as Seri Paduka Tuan, urging his subjects to extend and uphold Islam and providing 10 basic Sharia laws for their guidance.

The stone was found half-submerged by a bank of Tersat river in Kuala Berang, Hulu Terengganu, in 1887 CE after the floods had receded. A Terengganuan nobleman, Pengiran Anum Engku Abdul Kadir bin Engku Besar and his tin-prospector friend, Saiyed Husin Ghulam Al Bukhari came across the stone and brought it on a raft to Kuala Terengganu where it was presented to Sultan Zainal Abidin III, and placed atop of Bukit Puteri ('Princess hill').

In 2009, a meeting of the UNESCO's International Advisory Committee (IAC) held in Barbados, included the Inscribed Stone of Terengganu in the Memory of the World International Register, making it the fourth heritage recognition accorded to Malaysia after the Hikayat Hang Tuah, Sejarah Melayu, and the correspondence of Sultan Abdul Hamid in 2001.

== History ==
With the advent of Islam into Southeast Asia in the 10th or 11th century, a life based on the teachings of Quran and the Hadith became widespread and together with this, the use of the Arabic script. Over the time, the script was modified and adapted to suit the spoken Classical Malay language, and thus Jawi script was created. This development heralded a new age of literacy, when converts to the new faith gradually replaced the previous Indian-derived scripts with Jawi, in expressing their new belief.

As a testimony to the spread of Islam that originated from the Middle East, the artefact offers more than just a glimpse of the life of the people of the era. It also depicted the growing Islamic culture subsumed under a set of religious laws. A concomitant feature of this historic movement was the growth of maritime trade that centred around Kuala Berang, the place where the stone was discovered. The inscribed stone alludes to regional trade that flourished in the course of Islamisation, with its trading pattern and movement of peoples during that time.

While the Islamisation of Terengganu was pursued effectively with the rise of the new way of thinking, it did not completely put an end to the old way of life. The inscribed stone still contained a number of Sanskrit terms, a memorial to Southeast Asia's Hindu past.

== Discovery ==
The inscribed stone was first discovered by villagers at a steep sloping riverbank of Tersat river, Kampung Buluh, Kuala Berang, Hulu Terengganu in 1887, and was later brought to a nearby surau, known as Surau Tok Rashid. From there, the stone was further moved to Surau Kampung Buluh. In 1902, a Terengganuan nobleman, Pengiran Anum Engku Abdul Kadir bin Engku Besar and his Tin-prospector friend, Syed Husin bin Ghulam Al-Bokhari, came to Kampung Buluh. While they were at Surau Kampung Buluh to perform the Zuhr prayer, they noticed a stone with inscriptions used as a pedestal by the villagers, to step onto before entering the main prayer hall. After the prayer, they requested Penghulu Ali and his villagers to carry the stone on a raft to be brought to the capital, Kuala Terengganu. When it reached Kuala Terengganu, the stone was presented to Sultan Zainal Abidin III who ordered it to be placed atop of Bukit Puteri ('Princess Hill'), near to the royal palace.

The stone remained on top of the hill for 20 years, until July 1922, when the Deputy British adviser of Terengganu, Major H.S Peterson asked a Japanese photographer, N. Suzuki, to take images of the inscription and send them to C.O Bledgen to be analyzed. In 1923, British adviser to Terengganu, J.L Humphreys acquired approval from the Government of Terengganu to lend the stone to Raffles Museum, Singapore. The stone remained in Singapore for 37 years until 1960, when it was relocated to the National Museum of Malaysia.

The State Government of Terengganu have been lobbying for the repatriation of the Inscribed Stone to its home state since 1979. On 12 February 1987, the Terengganu officially wrote to the administration of the National Museum, seeking permission to relocate the Inscribed Stone to their State Museum. Only in 1991, the Federal Cabinet granted approval to the request and the Inscribed Stone was returned to Terengganu. It is now displayed at the Terengganu State Museum.

== Date of the inscription ==
The inscription is dated, however due to damage on the lower left edge of the stone, where the year of the inscription is mentioned in the 11th lines, the date is incomplete and can be variously read as ranging from 702 to 789 A.H. (1303 to 1387 CE). C.O. Blagden, who first deciphered the inscription, presented many possible dates that range from February – March 1303 CE to February 1387 CE. He doubted that the earlier date Rajab, 702 AH or 1303 CE would be correct, and concluded that on general grounds he was inclined to lean towards the latest possible date.

This dating was challenged by Syed Muhammad Naguib al-Attas, who argued that the earlier date is the correct one through a variety of logical, mathematical, linguistic, cultural, philosophical and mystical arguments, and by attempting to reconstruct the lost part of the inscription. In his speech published by the National Museum of Malaysia, Naguib stated that the correct date of the inscription is Friday, 4th of Rajab, 702 A.H., that corresponds to Friday, 22 February 1303 CE. His assertion is based on the following explanation.

The year 702 AH began on 26 August 1303 CE. The day on which the Christian Julian calendar year began for that Islamic calendar year was a Monday (i.e. 1 January 1303 CE was a Monday, and 237 days had elapsed in the Christian year when the Islamic year began on the 1st of Muharram (i.e. 26 August 1302 CE). Rajab is the 7th month of the Islamic calendar, and since the year 702 AH began in August 1302 CE, it therefore occurred in the month of February 1303 CE, which Christian year began on a Tuesday. Bearing in mind that the Christian year began on a Tuesday, it is found that only the 4th day of Rajab, which was the 181st day of the Islamic year 702, agrees with our computation of the date. Moreover, the 4th of Rajab confirms our computation because it was a Friday of Rajab, as mentioned in the inscription.

== Content ==
The stone is 89 cm in height, 53 cm in width at the top, and weighs 214.8 kg. All of its four facades have inscriptions written from right to left. The inscription is in Classical Malay written in the Jawi script, with dots for most of the Arabic-derived letters ( ب ، ت ، ج ، ش ، ق ، ن ، ي ) and native Jawi letters ( چ ، ݢ ، ڠ ، ڤ ), being not visible, except for the letters ( ڽ ، ض ، ف ).

Original Jawi text	English translation
Front facade
رسول الله دعں ىع اورح سىاىى مرٮک اسا فدا دىوٮ ملىا راى ٮرى همٮا مںكهكں اكاما اسلام دعں ٮٮر ٮحارا درما مرٮک مرٯسا ٮكى سكلںں همىا دىوٮ ملىا راى دٮٮواكو اٮى ٯٮٮٮو أكاما رسول الله صلى الله علىه وسلم راحا مٮدلٮكا ٮع ٮٮر ٮحارا سٮله دٮوٮ ملٮا راى ددالم ٮهومى. ٯٮٮٮوں اٮٮو ٯرض فدا سكلںں راحا مںدا لںكا اسلام مںورٮ سٮٮٮه دٮوٮ ملٮا راى دعں ںںر ںحارا ںرںاحںكى ںںوا ٯٮٮٮوں اٮٮو مک ٮٮٮه سرى ٯادوكا ںهں مدودوٯكى ںامرا اٮى دٮٮوا ٮرعكاٮو اد ٯرٮاما ادا حمعه دںولں رحٮ دٮاهں سرطاں دسسںكلا ںكںدا رسول الله ںله لالو ںوحه راںس دوا	Behold the Prophet of God and his apostles. Praise the God Almighty for giving us Islam. With Islam, truth revealed to all Thy creatures On this land the religion of the Holy Prophet shall prevail. The Holy Prophet, the upholder of truth in Thy kingdom. Hear ye kings, these messages. Messages from the Almighty, ye doubt not. Goodwill, with thee fellow men, saith the Almighty. Be it known, the land of Terengganu, the first to receive message of Islam. On the noon on Friday in the month of Rajab whilst the sun was in the north by religious reckoning. Seven hundred and two years after the demise of the Holy Prophet.
Rear facade
كلورک دںںوا حاوه..كں داںع ںرںكں كامڡ...اورع ںرٯهوںع حاعں معامںل..ک..هںلعكں امس كلںما درما ںارع اورع...دںكا حاعں معامںل ںوكل ںوٮ ٮماس حكا امںل هںلعكں امس. كاںم درم ںارع اورع ںرںوٮ ٮلاحارا لاكى لاكى ڡرمڡوں سںںںه دںوٮ ملںا راى حک مردںكا ںوحن ڡالو سراٮس راوىں. حک مردٮكا براسٮرى اٮوا ڡرمڡواں ىرسوامى دٮاٮم هعک ڡعكع دهمىالع دعں ىاٮو ماٮكں حک اعكر...همٮالع حک اٮڡ مٮدلٮكا	Brethren of lands distant. Cometh hither to tell ye. The Fourth Commandment for debtors. Take ye not, lose ye not, gold in thy hands. Fifth Commandment give thee alms and pay thy tithes. Take thee not, gold of others. If take thee the gold, return it. Peril be to adulterers. To repent, the following be done, command the Almighty. A hundred whips, for free man, a wife hath. A married woman, to be buried. To the waist and stoned to death. Ignore thee not. Be it the daughter of a prophet.
Right facade
ںوحں داںداڽ سڡوله ںعه ںںكا جک اى مںںرى ںوحں داںداڽ ںوحه ںاهل سڡاها ںعه ںںكا حك ںںوا ںوحں داںداڽ لںما ںاهل ںوحه ںاهل سڡاها ماسٯ ںںدارا حک اورع مردںكا كںوحه درما ںارع ٯرمٯوں هںدٯ ںںدا داٯٮ ںرسوامى حک ںرںواٮ ىالاحارا ںرںكں	Singles, the fine, ten and a half ‘saga’ A gentry not married, the fine, seven ‘tahils’...... Two and a half ‘saga’, the fine for older singles...... Seven ‘tahils’ to the treasury if...... Free man. The Seventh Commandment; dowry for woman should....... Deny her husband, if she commit adultery.
Left facade
ںںدا ںںر داںداڽ سںاهل سٯاها كسمںںلں درما سرى ٯادوكا ںهں سںاٯا ںںدا هرںا داںداڽ كسٯوله درما حک اںٯكو اںوا ٯماںںكو اںوا حوحوكو اںوا كلوركاكو اںوا اںٯ ںمرا اںى سكال اںسى ںمرا اںى ںارع سںاٯا ںںدا مںورٮ ںمرا اںى لعںٮ دںوٮ ملںا راى دحادںكں دںوٮ ملںا راى ںاكى ںع لعكر احارا ںمرا	... false evidence, the fine a ‘tahil’ and a ‘paha’ commandment nine.... Commandth the Almighty, the desolute, pay not the fine... My children, my uncles, my grandchildren and family and their siblings. Obey ye this command, for the wrath of God is great. Perils and pain awaits those who heed not the commandment.

== Jawi spelling system ==
The spelling system of the Inscribed Stone of Terengganu has similarities with modern Jawi spelling system in a number of areas:

- Use of the Letters tāʼ marbūṭah (ة) and tāʼ maftūḥah (ت) - For present-day spelling, Dewan Bahasa dan Pustaka has determined that the /t/ sound in Malay words should be denoted in Jawi script by tāʼ maftūḥah, whereas the /t/ sound in words particularly special nouns, borrowed from Arabic should be retained in its original form with tāʼ marbūṭah, except for common words that have been absorbed by and are regularly used in Malay such as rakyat (people) ( رعيت ), nikmat (grace) ( نعمت ), hikmat (wisdom) ( حکمت ) and berkat (blessing) ( برکت ). This system was established in the Inscribed Stone as per below table, where Arabic loanword which is a special noun, Jumaat (Friday) (جمعة) does not change.

Terengganu stone	Location	Rumi script	English meaning	Modern Jawi spelling (DBP)
مٮورٮ	Front:7	menurut	according to	منوروت
ٮوٮ	Rear:5	buat	do	بوات
داٯٮ	Right:6	dapat	get	داڤت
حمعه	Front:10	Jumaat	Friday	جمعة

- Use of the Letter Qāf (ق) in final closed syllables - In the present-day Jawi spelling system, all glottal stops in final closed syllables of Malay words are spelt with qāf, while the consonant sound /k/ in the final closed syllable of English loanwords is spelled with kāf such as abstrak (abstract) ( ابسترک ), plastik (plastic) ( ڤلستيک ) and kek (cake) ( كيک ). For Arabic loan words, the spelling of the source language is maintained such as for isyak ( عشاء ), imsak (the time to stop suhoor slightly before Fajr) ( امساک ), rujuk (refer) ( روجوع ) and talak (divorce) ( طلاق ). Some of the glottal stops in final closed syllables represented by letter qāf in the Inscribed Stone, are shown in the following table.

Terengganu stone	Location	Rumi script	English meaning	Modern Jawi spelling (DBP)
اٮٯ	Rear:12	anak	child	أنق
ماسٯ	Right:4	masuk	to enter	ماسوق
هٮدٯ	Right:5	hendak	want	هندق

- Use of the Letter Nya (ڽ) - Based on the consonants found on the Terengganu Inscribed Stone, there were consonant sounds in Classical Malay that were not found in the Arabic alphabet. Letters of this type include ca (چ) in acara (event) ( احارا ), nga (ڠ) in dengan (with) ( دعں ), pa (ڤ) in pada (to) ( فدا ), ga (ݢ) in pinggang (waist) ( ڡعكع ), and nya (ڽ) in denda-nya (the penalty) ( داٮداڽ ). However, a special feature of the Terengganu Stone is the use of the letter nya. It is exquisitely written with three dots above it, making it the oldest known Jawi letter.

Terengganu stone	Location	Rumi script	English meaning	Modern Jawi spelling (DBP)
احارا	Left:5	acara	event	أچارا
دعں	Front:3	dengan	with	دڠن
فدا	Front:2	pada	to	ڤد
ڡعكع	Rear:11	pinggang	waist	ڤيڠݢڠ
داىداڽ	Right:1	denda-nya	the penalty	دنداڽ

== Bibliography ==
- Adi Yasran, A. A.; Mohd Zin, M. Z.; Hashim, M.; Halimah, H.; Mohd Sharifudin, Y.; Syed Nurulakla, S. A.; Nurhidayah, J.; A. Asmadi Sakat; M. Roslan Mohd Nor (2012), "The Jawi writing system and vocabulary of the earliest legal malay inscription and manuscripts", Journal of Applied Sciences Research, 8 (7), ISSN 1816-157X
- Abdul Razak Salleh (2010), Batu Bersurat Terengganu: Perspektif Matematik (Inscribed Stone of Terengganu, a Mathematical perspective) (PDF), Malaysian Mathematical Science Society, archived from the original (PDF) on 5 March 2016
- An Ismanto (2009), Terengganu Stone Tablet, Melayu Online, archived from the original on 19 November 2015
- Hooker, Virginia Matheson (2003), A Short History of Malaysia: Linking East and West, Allen & Unwin, ISBN 978-186-4489-55-2
- Sayyid Qudratullah Fatimi (1963), Islam comes to Malaysia, Malaysian Sociological Research Institute
- Shahrizal Mahpol (2002), Penguasaan tulisan jawi di kalangan pelajar Melayu : suatu kajian khusus di UiTM cawangan Kelantan (Competency in Jawi among Malay students: A specific study in UiTM, Kelantan campus), Digital Repository, Universiti Malaya
- Syed Muhammad Naguib al-Attas (1970), The correct date of the Trengganu inscription, National Museum (Malaysia), ASIN B0006EWWKG
- Teeuw, Andries (1959), The history of the Malay language. A preliminary survey, Royal Netherlands Institute of Southeast Asian and Caribbean Studies
- UNESCO (2009), Memory of the World: Batu Bersurat Terengganu (Inscribed Stone of Terengganu) (PDF)
- UNESCO, Memory of the World: Malaysia
