= Sultan Mahmud Power Station =

Kenyir Dam
- Interactive map of Kenyir Dam
- Official name: Sultan Mahmud Power Station
- Location: Terengganu, Malaysia
- Coordinates: 5°1′25.23″N 102°54′35.88″E
- Construction began: 1978
- Opening date: 1988
- Operator: Tenaga Nasional Berhad

Dam and spillways
- Impounds: Kenyir River
- Height: 150 metres (492 ft)
- Length: 800 metres (2,625 ft)

Reservoir
- Creates: Kenyir Lake
- Total capacity: 13.6 km^{3} (3.3 cu mi)
- Catchment area: 2,600 km^{2} (1,004 sq mi)
- Surface area: 370 km^{2} (143 sq mi)

Power Station
- Turbines: 4 x 100 MW
- Installed capacity: 400 MW
- Annual generation: 1,600 GWh

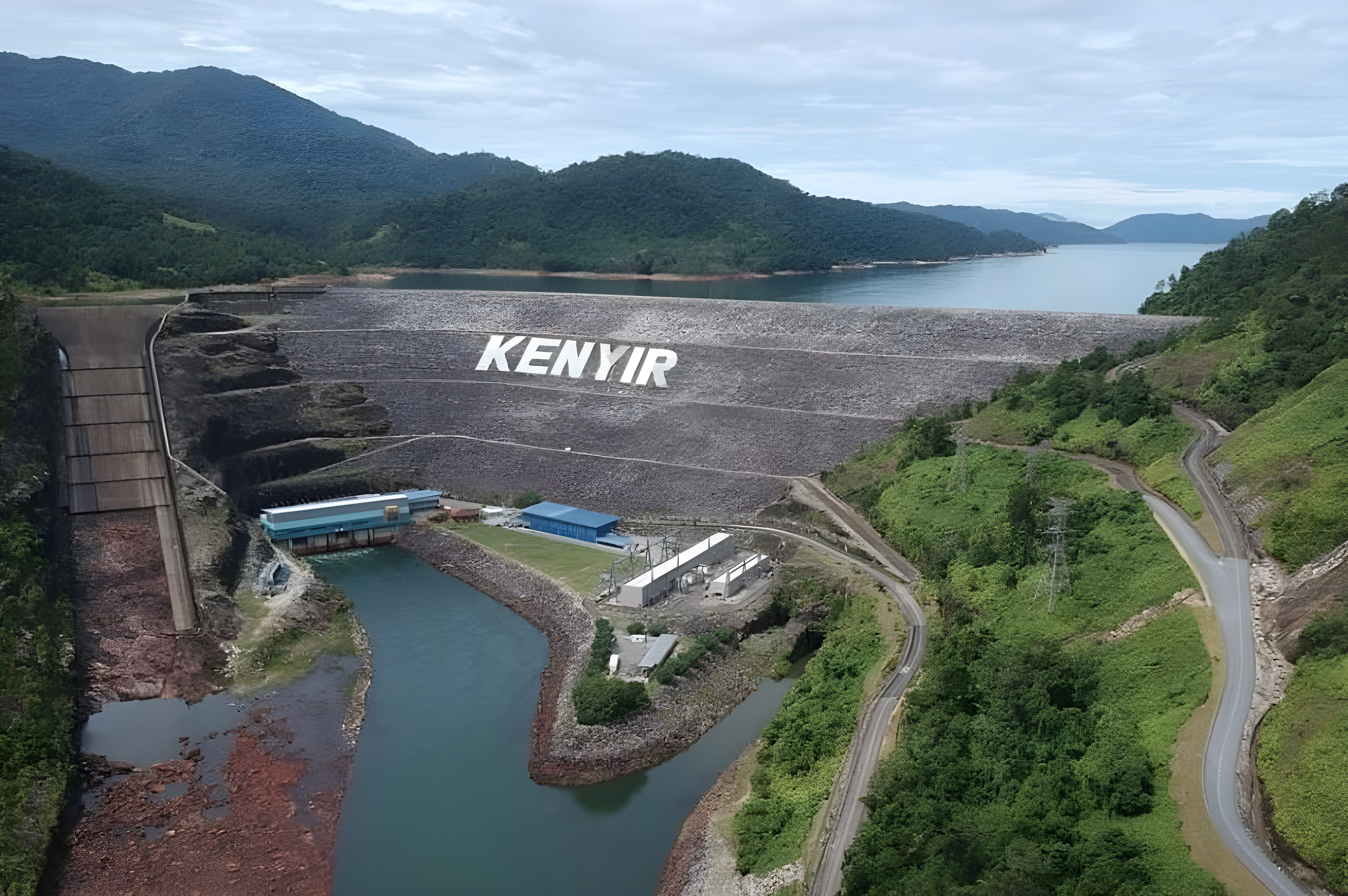
Sultan Mahmud Power Station

Sultan Mahmud Power Station or Kenyir Dam (Malay: Empangan Kenyir) is the hydroelectric dam which forms Kenyir Lake, Terengganu, Malaysia. It is located 50 km southwest of Kuala Terengganu on the Kenyir River. The project is a multipurpose hydroelectric power and flood mitigation scheme.

== History ==
The Kenyir River was first identified for hydroelectric potential in 1961 but it proved financially unviable due to low energy demand and high cost of construction. Years later in 1972 the Malaysian government revived the study and further site investigations were proceeded.

Construction started in 1978 and was completed in 1985. In 1987 the dam was officially opened by Sultan Mahmud Al-Muktafi Billah Shah the Sultan of Terengganu. The dam's power station was named after the Sultan as the "Sultan Mahmud Hydro Electric Power Station". The station is operated by Tenaga Nasional Berhad.

== Kenyir dam technical specifications ==
The power station is a hydroelectric power station, using four turbines of 100 megawatt each. Continuous power output is 165 MW. Average annual energy output is 1,600 GWh.

The dam is 150 m in height above foundation, with a crest length of 800 m, and the dam fill volume is 15.20 million cubic metres. Crest elevation is 155 m above sea level (ASL) while maximum flood level is 153 m. The maximum operating level is 145 m and a minimum of 120 m. The reservoir surface area at 145 m ASL is 370 km^{2}, and with a catchment area of 2,600 km^{2} Storage capacity is 13,600 million cubic metres.

In case of overflow during monsoon seasons there is a spillway that is ungated/free flow, with a maximum capacity of 7,000 cubic metres per second. Water flows through four penstocks into four turbines turning four air-cooled electric generators rated at 100 megawatt each.

== Men at Helm ==
The Station Superintendents and General Managers of Sultan Mahmud Hydropower Station since its official commencement of commercial operations are listed below.

1. Hj Wan Abdullah b. Ahmad
2. Hj Khairudin b. Md Yunus
3. Hj Othman b. Mahmud
4. Hj Mohamad b. Che Jusof
5. Hj Muhammad b. Ismail
6. Hj Azhar b. Mat Yunus
7. Hj Aidee b. Hamidin
8. Hj Mustaffa b. Hashim
9. Hj Mustaphakamal b. Yaacob
10. Hj Rasidi bin Yamin

== See also ==
- Tenaga Nasional Berhad – Malaysian electricity company
