= Kuala Berang =

Town in Hulu Terengganu, Terengganu, Malaysia

- Town and district capital
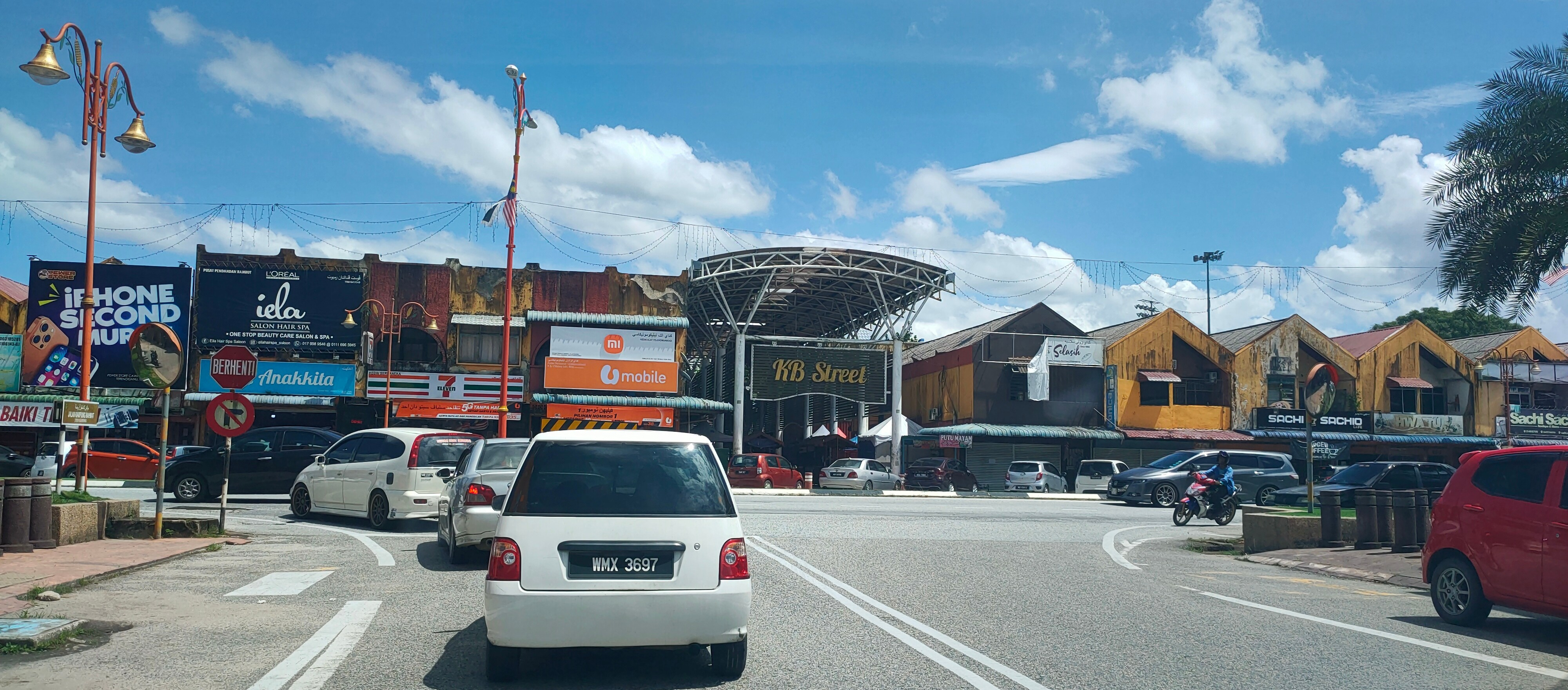
- A street in Kuala Berang Town, Terengganu

- Location within Terengganu Location within Malaysia
- Coordinates: 5°4′23.149″N 103°0′40.54″E
- Country: Malaysia
- State: Terengganu
- District: Hulu Terengganu

Government
  - Type: District council
  - Body: Hulu Terengganu District Council

Population (2005)
  - Total: 18,764

Kuala Berang is the seat and largest town of Hulu Terengganu District, Terengganu, Malaysia. The town serves as a gateway to Kenyir Lake. The Terengganu Inscription Stone was found near Kuala Berang in 1899. The town of Kuala Berang was the first capital of the modern Sultanate of Terengganu before moving to Kuala Terengganu.

== Administration ==
Kuala Berang (and the entire Hulu Terengganu district) is governed by Hulu Terengganu District Council (MDHT).

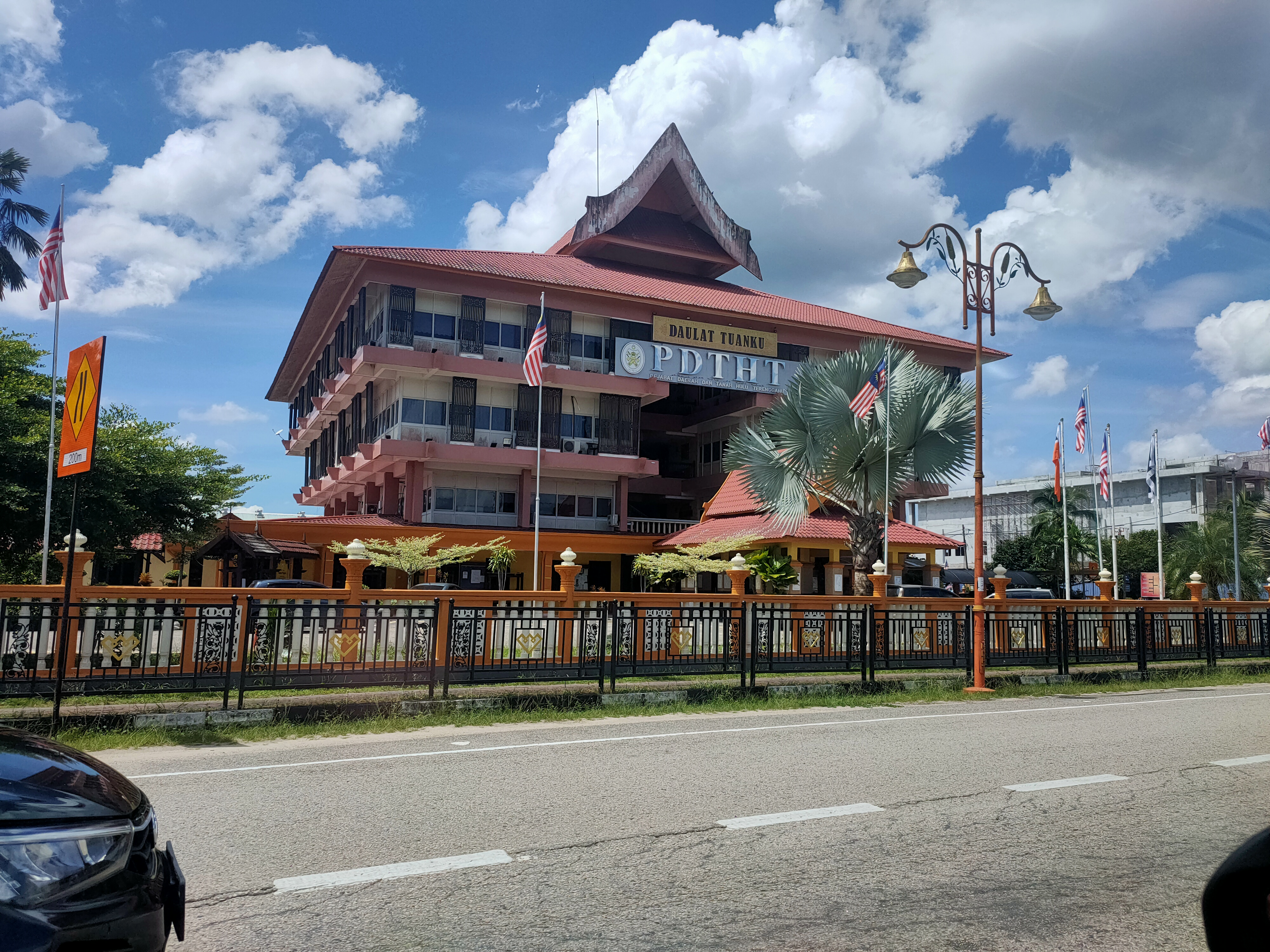
Hulu Terengganu District and Land Office Building, Kuala Berang.

== Access ==
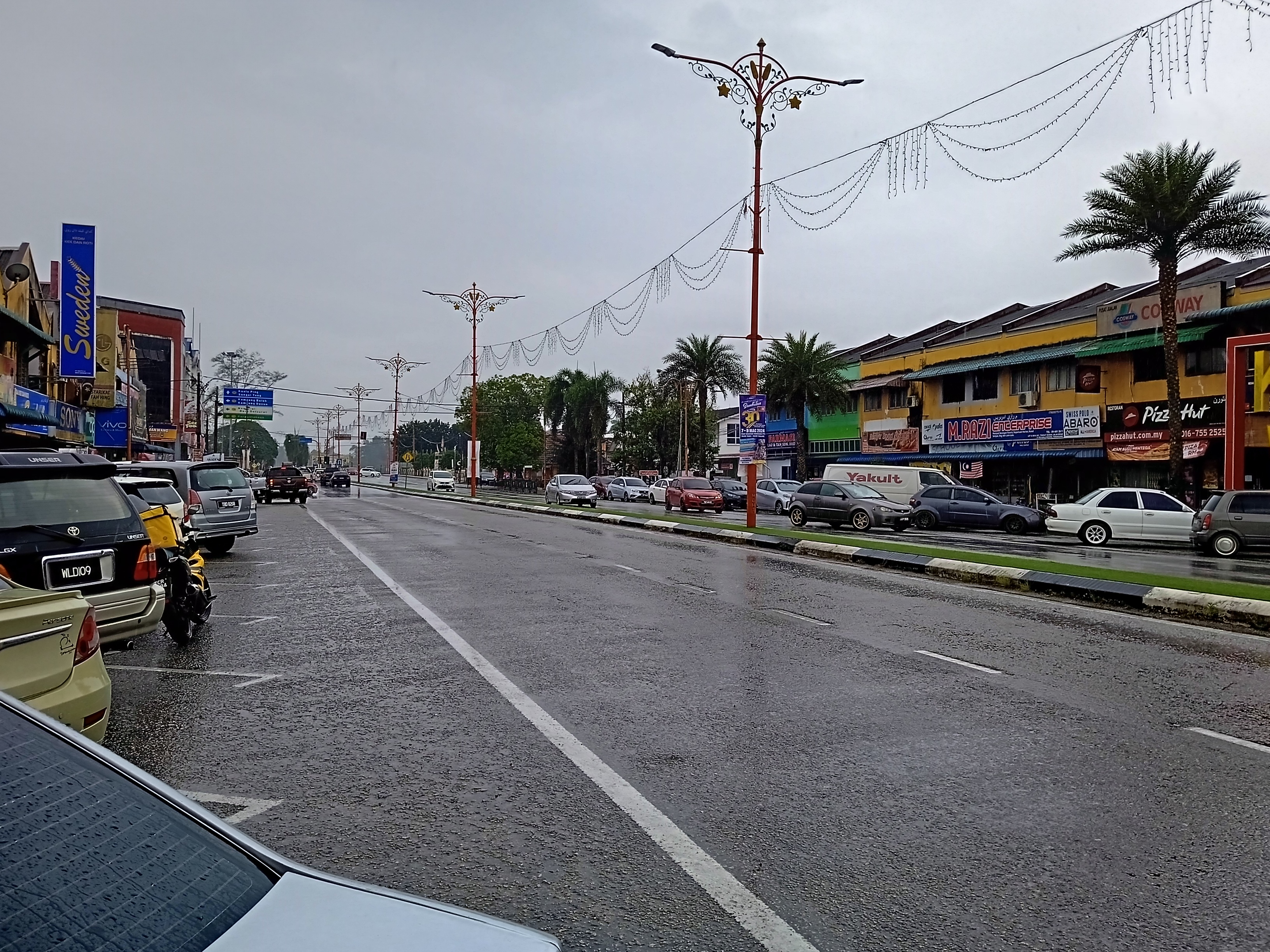
FT 106 (Jalan Kuala Berang-Ajil) along Kuala Berang

Kuala Berang is connected to Ajil and subsequently Kuala Terengganu by Federal Route 106 and then Federal Route 14. Federal Route 247 begins in Kuala Berang and ends at Kuala Jenderis, where it interchanges into Federal Route 185 which goes to Gua Musang in Kelantan, Cameron Highlands in Pahang before terminating at Simpang Pulai near Ipoh in Perak.

Alternately there is an interchange to the East Coast Expressway at Ajil.

== Public transport ==
Kuala Berang bus station offers intercity services to various cities and towns in Peninsular Malaysia. Local bus services that go between Hulu Terengganu and Kuala Terengganu are also available.

As with the rest of Terengganu, Kuala Berang does not have any form of rail transport.

== Politics ==
Kuala Berang forms its own electoral district in the Terengganu State Legislative Assembly, currently represented by Yang Berhormat Dr. Haji Mamad Puteh of PAS.

On the national level, Kuala Berang is part of the Hulu Terengganu parliamentary constituency, currently represented by Yang Berhormat Dato' Rosol Wahid, from PPBM.

== Climate ==
Kuala Berang has a tropical rainforest climate (Af). It receives moderate rainfall from February to May and heavy to very heavy rainfall in the remaining months, with the driest month being February, and the wettest, December.

Preceded by Penghulu Diman	District Capital of Hulu Terengganu (2009-Present)	Succeeded by Present
