= Hulu Terengganu District =

Hulu Terengganu District Hulu Tranung (Terengganu Malay)
- District of Terengganu
- Daerah Hulu Terengganu
- Flag Seal
- Interactive map of Hulu Terengganu District
- Location of Hulu Terengganu District in Malaysia
- Coordinates: 5°05′N 102°45′E
- Country: Malaysia
- State: Terengganu
- Seat: Kuala Berang
- Local area government(s): Hulu Terengganu District Council

Government
  - District officer: Ahmad Azizi bin Zulkifli

Area
  - Total: 3,874.63 km^{2} (1,496.00 sq mi)

Population (2010)
  - Total: 72,052
  - Estimate (2014): 80,300
  - Density: 18.596/km^{2} (48.163/sq mi)
- Time zone: UTC+8 (MST)
  - Summer (DST): UTC+8 (Not observed)
- Postcode: 21xxx
- Calling code: +6-09-6
- Vehicle registration plates: T

Hulu Terengganu (lit. 'Upper Terengganu', Terengganu Malay: Hulu Tranung) is an interior district of Terengganu, Malaysia. The seat of the district is Kuala Berang, located about 40 km (25 mi) from the state capital, Kuala Terengganu. The local government of this district is Hulu Terengganu District Council.

== Background ==
Hulu Terengganu is the largest district in terms of land area and the only landlocked district in Terengganu. Hulu Terengganu District Council was established on 1 January 1981 under the 3rd Section of Local Government Act 1976 (Act 171) (Amendment 1978). Prior to this it was known as Jumaah Bandaran Ulu Terengganu. It was formally launched by the Menteri Besar of Terengganu at the time, Wan Mokhtar Ahmad, at the Penghulu Diman Municipal Hall on Monday, 30 August 1982.

Its operation area is 53.4 km^{2} (20.6 sq mi) whereas the administrational area is 3,821.23 km^{2} (1,475.39 sq mi). The population in 2000 was numbered at 74,918, 3,586 more than during MDHT's early years (year 1970). This has now decreased to just above 70,000. Hulu Terengganu has one village for Orang Asli, the indigenous people of Peninsular Malaysia, which is Kampung Sungai Berua.

== Administrative divisions ==

Hulu Terengganu District is divided into 10 mukims, which are:

- Hulu Berang
- Hulu Telemung
- Hulu Terengganu
- Jenagur
- Kuala Berang
- Kuala Telemung
- Penghulu Diman
- Tanggul
- Tersat
- Kuala Berang town

== Demographics ==
Historical population
Year	Pop.	±%
1991	56,986	—
2000	62,322	+9.4%
2010	70,800	+13.6%
2020	69,881	−1.3%

== Culture and places of interest ==
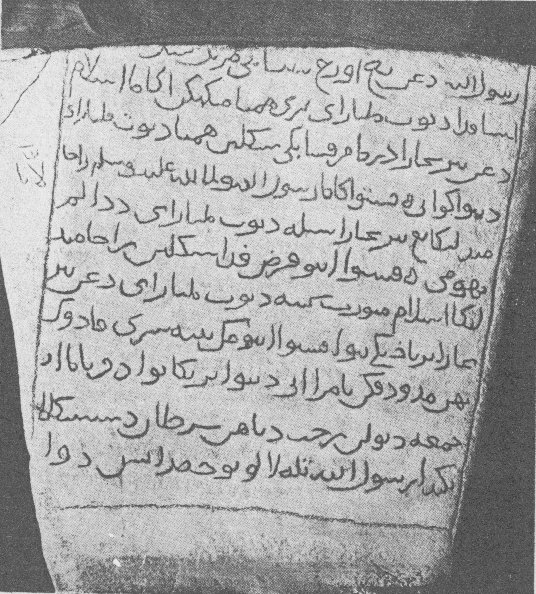
Terengganu Inscription Stone

The district is where the famous Terengganu Inscription Stone was found. It was accidentally discovered near Sungai Tersat by an Arab trader named Sayid Husin bin Ghulam al-Bokhari in 1899 after a flash flood hit Kuala Berang. The inscription on the stone proclaims Islam as the state religion of Terengganu. This artifact is a symbol of an earlier arrival of Islam to the Malay Peninsula, even earlier from that of Malacca Sultanate. It is now displayed in Terengganu State Museum.

As an interior district, forest still occupied a large area of the district. The district is particularly popular for Tasik Kenyir or Kenyir Lake. Kenyir Lake is an artificial lake created in 1985 by the damming of the Kenyir River to create the Sultan Mahmud Power Station. It is the largest man-made lake in South East Asia. It covers 260 km^{2} (100 sq mi) and contains 340 small islands, which were once hilltops and highlands, more than 14 waterfalls, numerous rapids and rivers. Because the lake is a reservoir, the water level can vary depending on the month. The water level is highest in March and April.

Although an artificial lake, the area has been developed for eco-tourism, and there are many resorts around its shores. Fishing is common, as are jungle treks, waterfalls and caves. According to the locals, the best season for fishing is August when the water level is lower. Jungle trekking sites include Pengkalan Gawi, Bewah at National Park, along the rivers of Saok, Lasir, Tembat and Lawit. Kayaking, canoeing, boating, rafting and rapids shooting are among the water sport activities available here.

Other places of interest in Hulu Terengganu are Lata Belukar Bukit and Sekayu Waterfall. Lata Belukar Bukit is a newly developed area and is popular among the locals. Belukar Bukit is a picnic and camping site. Its natural environment as well as coolness from the waters are the main attractions to this place. The Belukar Bukit picnic area is 20 km (12 mi) south of Kuala Berang.

== Federal Parliament and State Assembly Seats ==
List of Hulu Terengganu district representatives in the Federal Parliament (Dewan Rakyat)

Parliament	Seat Name	Member of Parliament	Party
P38	Hulu Terengganu	Rosol Wahid	PN (BERSATU)

List of Hulu Terengganu district representatives in the State Legislative Assembly of Terengganu

Parliament	State	Seat Name	State Assemblyman	Party
P38	N21	Telemung	Mohd Zawawi Ismail	PN (BERSATU)
P38	N22	Manir (Note: Manir state constituency is under the administration of the Kuala Terengganu City Council (Majlis Bandaraya Kuala Terengganu, MBKT) instead of the Hulu Terengganu District Council.)	Hilmi Harun	PN (PAS)
P38	N23	Kuala Berang	Mamad Puteh	PN (PAS)
P38	N24	Ajil	Maliaman Kassim	PN (PAS)

== Schools in Hulu Terengganu ==
1. Politeknik Hulu Terengganu
2. Sekolah Kebangsaan Sungai Berua, Hulu Terengganu
3. Sekolah Kebangsaan Seri Buluh, Hulu Terengganu
4. Sekolah Kebangsaan Kuala Ping, Hulu Terengganu
5. Sekolah Kebangsaan Dusun, Hulu Terengganu
6. Sekolah Kebangsaan Teris, Hulu Terengganu
7. Akademik Binaan Malaysia (Wilayah Timur)
8. Sekolah Kebangsaan Kemat, Hulu Terengganu
9. Sekolah Kebangsaan Nibong
10. Sekolah Imtiaz Kuala Berang
11. Sekolah Menengah Sains Hulu Terengganu
12. Sekolah Kebangsaan Tengku Ampuan Intan
13. Sekolah Kebangsaan Kuala Berang
14. Sekolah Kebangsaan Seri Berang
15. Sekolah Menengah Kebangsaan Tengku Ampuan Intan (Sekolah Premier)
16. Sekolah Menengah Agama Mahmudiah
17. Sekolah Menengah Kebangsaan Seri Berang
18. Sekolah Menengah Kebangsaan Ajil
19. Kolej Tingkatan Enam Hulu Terengganu
20. Maktab Rendah Sains Mara (MRSM) Kuala Berang

== See also ==
- Districts of Malaysia
