= Kenyir Lake =

Reservoir in Terengganu, Malaysia

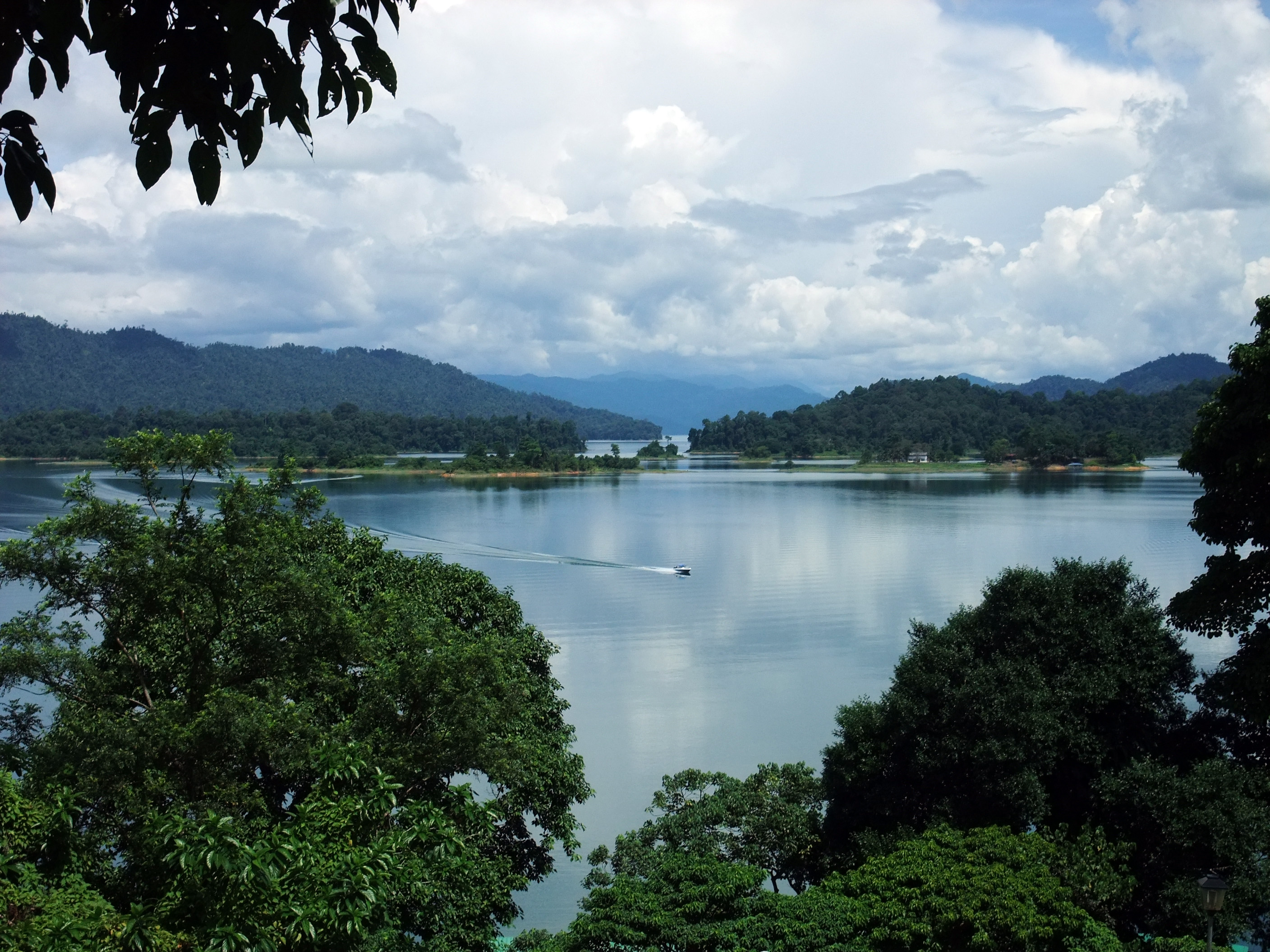

- Location within Terengganu Location within Malaysia
- Location: Terengganu, Malaysia
- Coordinates: 5°00′N 102°48′E
- Type: Reservoir
- Primary inflows: Kenyir River
- Primary outflows: Terengganu River
- Basin countries: Malaysia
- Surface area: 260 km^{2} (100 sq mi)
- Max. depth: 476 feet (145 m)
- Islands: 340

Kenyir Lake (Malay: Tasik Kenyir; Jawi: تاسيق كڽير) is an artificial lake located in Hulu Terengganu, Terengganu, Malaysia, nestled deep in the Pantai Timur Range. The lake was created in 1985 by the Kenyir Dam on the Kenyir River, the upper stream of the Terengganu River. The lake provides water to the nearby Sultan Mahmud Power Station. It is the largest man-made lake in mainland Southeast Asia with an area of 260,000 hectares.

== Flora and fauna ==
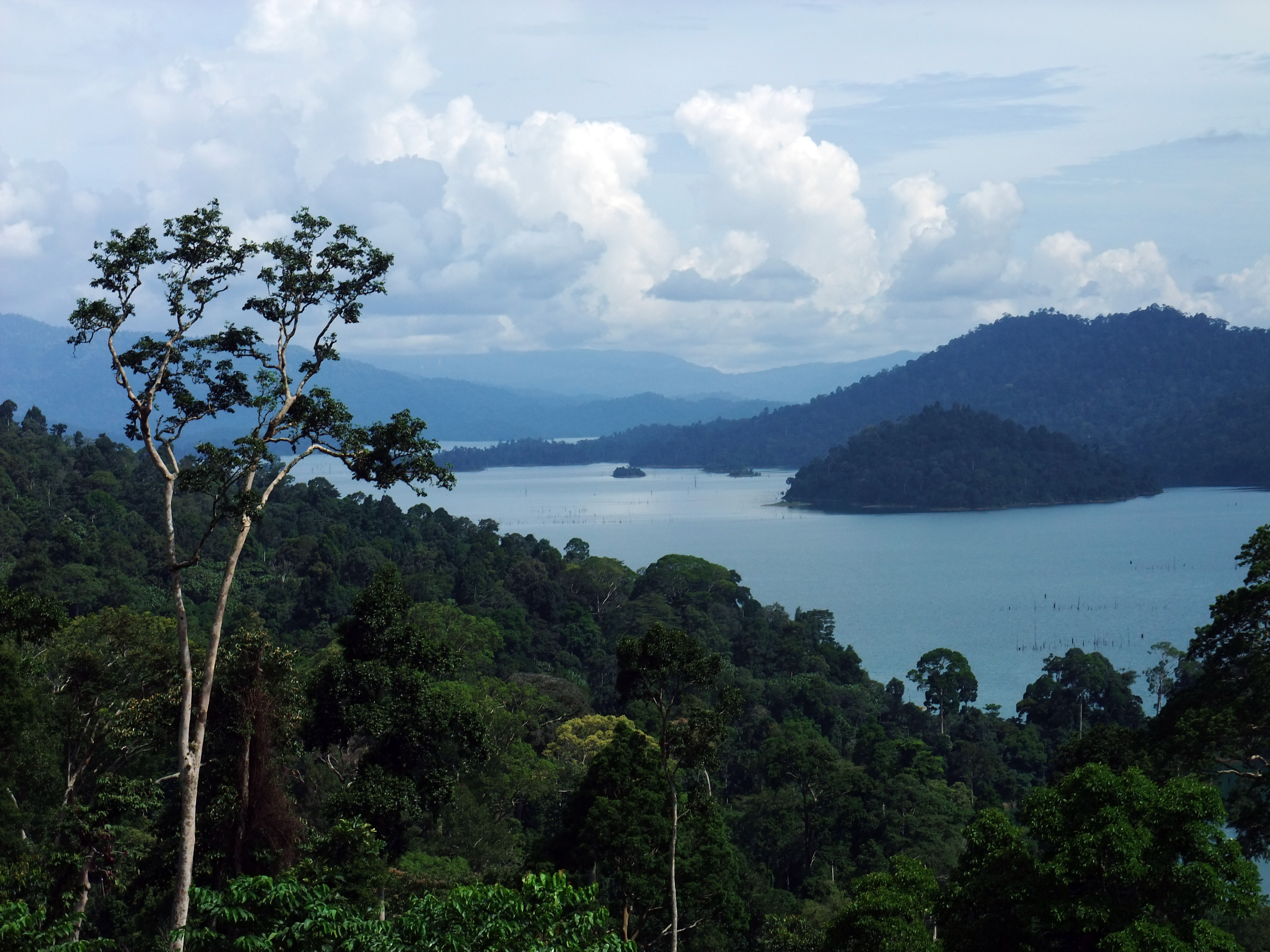
Kenyir Lake with surrounding jungle

Kenyir Lake is home to numerous species of freshwater fish and exotic wildlife. With a water catchment area of 38,000 hectares, the lake is naturally a haven for freshwater fish. A recent study revealed that there are some 300 species of freshwater fish dwelling in the lake. The presence of dead trees around the lake serves as a perfect breeding ground for these fishes. Algae growing on dead trees and branches serve as the main form of sustenance for the fishes. From studies and observations conducted by the Department of Fisheries, species such as the big Lampam Sungai (barboides), Kelah (Malayan mahseer or Tor tambroides), Toman (snakehead), Tapah (wallagonia leerii) Kawan (Friendly Barb), Kalui (Giant Gouramy) and Kelisa (green arowana) are found in the water and around dead trees.

The jungles surrounding Kenyir Lake are home to some endangered species, such as Asian elephants and Malayan tigers.

== Tourism ==
Although a reservoir, the area has been successfully developed for eco-tourism, and there are many resorts on its shores. Fishing is popular, as are jungle treks, waterfalls and caves. According to the locals, the best season for fishing is August when the water level is lower. Popular spots for jungle trekking are Pengkalan Gawi, Bewah at the Terengganuan section of the Taman Negara, along the rivers of Saok, Lasir, Tembat and Lawit. Kayaking, canoeing, boating, whitewater rafting and rapids shooting are among the many water sports available here.
